= Ron English (American football) =

American football player and coach (born 1968)

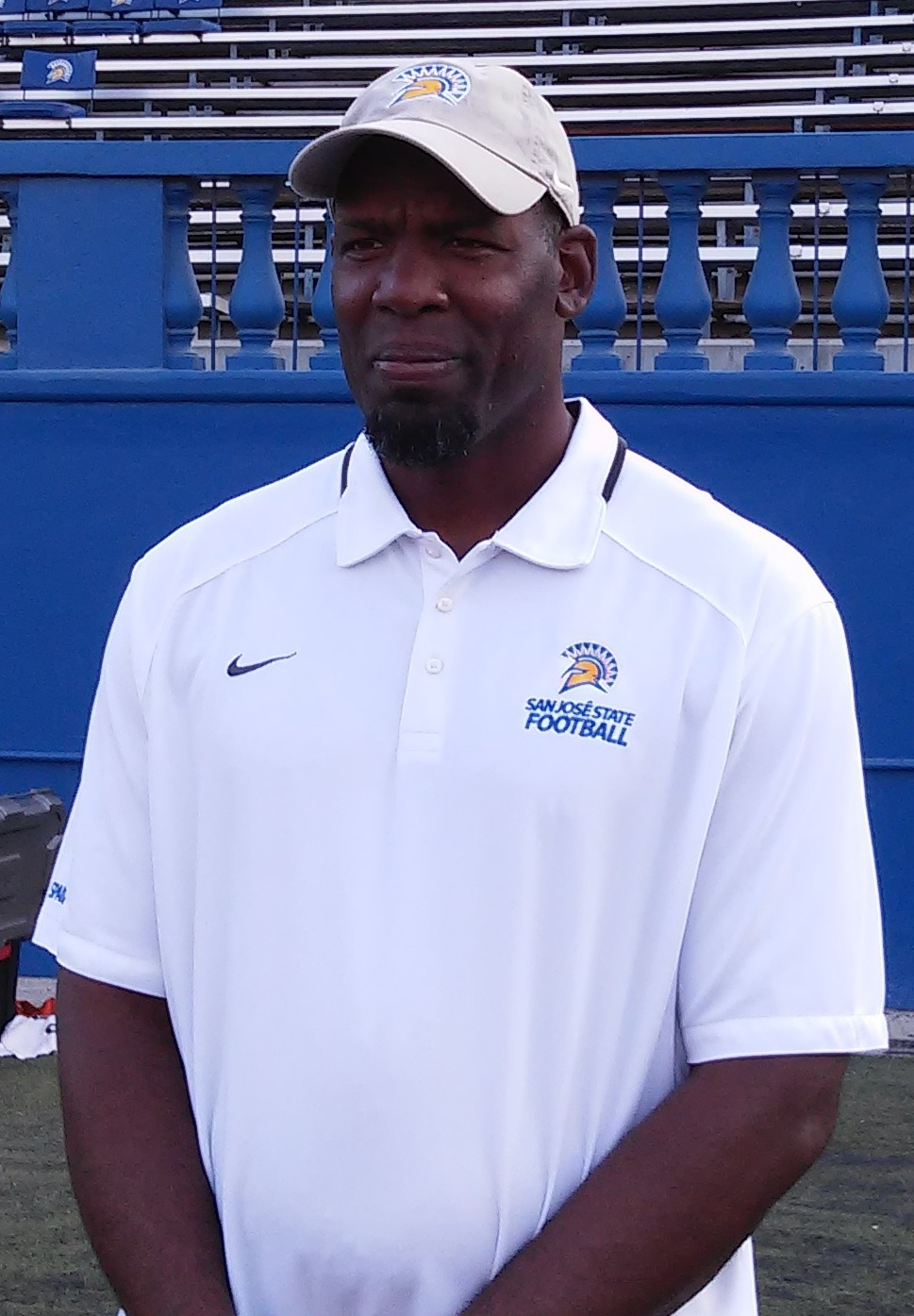
- English in 2016

Biographical details
- Born: May 21, 1968 (age 58); Pomona, California, U.S.

Playing career
- 1987–1990: California
- Position: Safety

Coaching career (HC unless noted)
- 1992: Pomona Ganesha HS (CA) (assistant)
- 1993: Mt. San Antonio (DB)
- 1994–1995: Arizona State (GA)
- 1996 (spring): Northern Arizona (DB)
- 1996–1997: San Diego State (DB)
- 1998–2002: Arizona State (DB)
- 2003–2005: Michigan (DB)
- 2006–2007: Michigan (DC)
- 2008: Louisville (DC)
- 2009–2013: Eastern Michigan
- 2016: San Jose State (DC)
- 2017: Mississippi State (S)
- 2018–2020: Florida (S)
- 2021–2022: Purdue (co-DC/DB)
- 2023–2025: Louisville (co-DC/DB)

Head coaching record
- Overall: 11–46

Accomplishments and honors

Awards
- Rivals.com Defensive Coordinator of the Year (2006); MAC Coach of the Year (2011)

Ronald Everett English (born May 21, 1968) is an American football coach and former player. He was most recently the defensive coordinator and defensive backs coach at the University of Louisville. English also served as the head football coach at Eastern Michigan University from 2009 to 2013, compiling a record of 11–46.

== Playing career and education ==
From 1987 to 1990, English played college football at the University of California, Berkeley. He graduated in 1991 with a degree in communications. In 1995, he received his master's degree in education administration from Arizona State University.

== Coaching career ==
=== Assistant coach (1992–2008) ===
English has served as an assistant coach at Mt. San Antonio College, Northern Arizona University, San Diego State University, Arizona State University, the University of Michigan, and University of Louisville. He coached the defensive secondary at Michigan from 2003 through 2005. In February 2006, he accepted a position on the coaching staff of the NFL's Chicago Bears. However, Michigan head coach Lloyd Carr persuaded English to stay on as the defensive coordinator after Jim Herrmann, who coordinated Michigan's defense from 1997 to 2005, accepted a position with the NFL's New York Jets. In the 2006 season, English coached only safeties, rather than the entire defensive secondary, to allow him to concentrate more fully on his responsibilities as defensive coordinator. English's defense showed great success against most run-heavy teams in the Big Ten Conference and allowed the fewest rushing yards per game in the nation.

With Carr's retirement at the end of the 2007 season, English, along with all of the assistant coaches at Michigan except for running backs coach Fred Jackson, was fired by incoming head coach Rich Rodriguez. English interviewed for the head coaching vacancies at the University of Arkansas and at Michigan before accepting the defensive coordinator duties for Steve Kragthorpe at the University of Louisville.

=== Eastern Michigan (2009–2013) ===
English was hired as head coach at Eastern Michigan in December 2008. At the time of his hiring by Eastern Michigan, he was one of six African American head coaches at Football Bowl Subdivision teams; the others (and their teams at the time) were Turner Gill (Buffalo), Kevin Sumlin (Houston), Mike Locksley (New Mexico), Randy Shannon (University of Miami), and Mike Haywood (Miami University) .

Eastern Michigan compiled a 0–12 record in 2009. An article on ESPN.com ranked the Eagles the second-worst team in NCAA FBS football.

The Eagles posted a 2–10 record in 2010, English's second season as head coach, losing all four non-conference games and stretching their losing streak to 18 games before winning an overtime game at Ball State and another game at Buffalo in the latter part of the season.

2011 saw the Eagles achieve their best season in 17 years. They finished the season 6–6, 4–4 in MAC play to finish in a tie for fourth place in the West Division. Despite being 6–6, the Eagles were not bowl eligible because two of their wins came against FCS teams. The 6 wins were the most wins the school had since 1995 when they also had 6 wins. Following the season, English was named the Mid American Conference Coach of the Year.

Following the success of the 2011 season, media outlets speculated that English could be a candidate for head coaching openings at BCS schools. Based on his west coast recruiting background and Big Ten coaching experience, the schools most often mentioned were Illinois, Arizona State, and Washington State.

English returned to the Eagles as head coach for the 2012 season. Eastern Michigan posted a 2–10 record in 2012, with their wins coming against Army (48–38) and Western Michigan (29–23). EMU faced a difficult schedule, with 7 losses to teams that participated in a post season bowl game. Additionally, the Eagles lost to (FCS) #14 ranked Illinois State by a score of 31–14 in the second week of the season.

English was abruptly fired on November 8, 2013—less than 24 hours before the Eagles' game against Western Michigan. Later that day, The Detroit News revealed that English had been fired after school officials obtained a tape of a tirade English delivered to his team during an October team meeting. The speech was laden with expletives ("shitbird" was especially plentiful), and included at least one homophobic slur. On November 9, athletic director Heather Lyke confirmed the existence of the tape and condemned it as "wholly inappropriate" and "absolutely unacceptable." English subsequently apologized, admitting that he had "lost my poise," but hoped to be able to coach again.

=== Career after Eastern Michigan (2014–present) ===
In 2014, English joined the Cleveland Browns' internship program under a Bill Walsh NFL Minority Coaching Fellowship. English also spent more time with his family and in church.

English returned to coaching on February 9, 2016, as defensive coordinator at San Jose State under Ron Caragher.

On February 2, 2017, English joined Dan Mullen's staff at Mississippi State as safeties coach. He followed Mullen to Florida.

In 2021, he became one of three defensive coordinators employed by Jeff Brohm at Purdue, with English also specializing as secondaries coach. English continued to work with Brohm at Louisville. He took the 2026 season off to watch his son Seth's senior year at Navy.

== Head coaching record ==
Year	Team	Overall	Conference	Standing	Bowl/playoffs
Eastern Michigan Eagles (Mid-American Conference) (2009–2013)
2009	Eastern Michigan	0–12	0–8	6th (West)	
2010	Eastern Michigan	2–10	2–6	6th (West)	
2011	Eastern Michigan	6–6	4–4	T–4th (West)	
2012	Eastern Michigan	2–10	1–7	6th (West)	
2013	Eastern Michigan	1–8	0–5	(fired)	
Eastern Michigan:		11–46	7–30		
Total:		11–46			
