= 2010 Buffalo Bulls football team =

American college football season

2010 Buffalo Bulls football
- Conference: Mid-American Conference
- East Division
- Record: 2–10 (1–7 MAC)
- Head coach: Jeff Quinn (1st season)
- Offensive coordinator: Greg Forest (1st season)
- Offensive scheme: Multiple
- Defensive coordinator: William Inge (1st season)
- Base defense: 4–3
- Captains: Peter Bittner; Domonic Cook; Davonte Shannon; Justin Winters
- Home stadium: University at Buffalo Stadium

2010 Mid-American Conference football standings
	Conf.			Overall
Team	W		L	W		L
East Division
Miami (OH) x$	7	–	1	10	–	4
Ohio	6	–	2	8	–	5
Temple	5	–	3	8	–	4
Kent State	4	–	4	5	–	7
Bowling Green	1	–	7	2	–	10
Buffalo	1	–	7	2	–	10
Akron	1	–	7	1	–	11
West Division
Northern Illinois x	8	–	0	11	–	3
Toledo	7	–	1	8	–	5
Western Michigan	5	–	3	6	–	6
Ball State	3	–	5	4	–	8
Central Michigan	2	–	6	3	–	9
Eastern Michigan	2	–	6	2	–	10
Championship: Miami 26, Northern Illinois 21
$ – Conference champion; x – Division champion/co-champions

The 2010 Buffalo Bulls football team represented the University at Buffalo as a member of the Mid-American Conference (MAC) during the 2010 NCAA Division I FBS football season. Led by first-year head coach Jeff Quinn, the Bulls compiled an overall record of 2–10 with a mark of 1–7 in conference play, placing in a three-way tie for fifth at bottom of the standings in the MAC's East Division. The team played home games at the University at Buffalo Stadium in Amherst, New York.

== Schedule ==
Date	Time	Opponent	Site	TV	Result	Attendance	Source
September 2	7:00 p.m.	Rhode Island*	University at Buffalo Stadium; Amherst, NY	TWCSN	W 31–0	16,273	
September 11	7:00 p.m.	at Baylor*	Floyd Casey Stadium; Waco, TX	FCS Central	L 6–34	40,853	
September 18	7:00 p.m.	UCF*	University at Buffalo Stadium; Amherst, NY	TWCSN	L 10–24	14,312	
September 25	12:00 p.m.	at Connecticut*	Rentschler Field; East Hartford, CT	Big East Network	L 21–45	36,738	
October 2	3:30 p.m.	at Bowling Green	Doyt Perry Stadium; Bowling Green, OH	BCSN	W 28–26	14,544	
October 16	3:30 p.m.	at Northern Illinois	Huskie Stadium; DeKalb, IL		L 14–45	21,230	
October 23	12:00 p.m.	Temple^{†}	University at Buffalo Stadium; Amherst, NY	ESPN Plus	L 0–42	13,371	
October 30	3:30 p.m.	Miami (OH)	University at Buffalo Stadium; Amherst, NY	TWCSN	L 9–21	12,786	
November 4	7:30 p.m.	at Ohio	Peden Stadium; Athens, OH	ESPNU	L 17–34	15,112	
November 12	6:00 p.m.	Ball State	University at Buffalo Stadium; Amherst, NY	ESPNU	L 3–20	11,355	
November 20	2:00 p.m.	Eastern Michigan	University at Buffalo Stadium; Amherst, NY	STO	L 17–21	9,786	
November 26	2:00 p.m.	at Akron	InfoCision Stadium – Summa Field; Akron, OH	STO	L 14–22	5,216	
*Non-conference game; ^{†}Homecoming; All times are in Eastern time

== Personnel ==
=== Roster ===
2010 Buffalo Bulls football team roster
Players
Coaches
Offense

Pos.	#	Name	Class
RB	1	James Potts	Fr
WR	2	Marcus Rivers	Sr
QB	4	Jerry Davis	Jr
WR	5	Terrell Jackson	Sr
QB	8	Rudy Johnson	Fr
QB	11	Cory Jorgensen	Sr
WR	11	Aaron Walters	Fr
TE	12	Alex Dennison	So
RB	13	Brandon Murie	So
QB	15	Alex Zordich	So
WR	18	Fred Lee	So
WR	19	Alex Neutz	So
RB	21	Jeffvon Gill	Jr
WR	25	John Dunmore	Fr
WR	26	Aaron Huber	Fr
RB	32	Branden Oliver	So
RB	43	Josh Fuller	Jr
OL	50	Andre Davis	Fr
OL	55	Graham Whinery	Jr
OL	56	Jasen Carlson	So
OL	65	Dillon Guy	Fr
OL	66	Jeff Veinotte	Fr
OL	67	Jake Silas	Fr
OL	70	Pat Wilson	So
OL	71	Trevor Sales	So
OL	75	Josh Violanti	Sr
OL	76	Anthony Bartholomew	So
OL	77	Gabriel Barbe	Fr
OL	78	Matt Ostrowski	Sr
OL	79	Gokhan Ozkan	Jr
TE	80	Aaron Connacher	Sr
TE	81	Jimmy Gordon	So
WR	84	Derek Brim	So
WR	85	Cordero Dixon	Fr
WR	87	Devon Hughes	Fr
TE	88	Jake Reeder	So

Defense

Pos.	#	Name	Class
LB	3	Josh Copeland	Sr
DB	4	Cortney Lester	Fr
DB	8	Isaac Baugh	Jr
DB	9	Alan Hayes	Sr
DB	17	Joe Petit	Sr
DB	19	Daniel Gold	So
DB	20	Ray Anthony Long	Jr
LB	23	Delano Fabor	So
LB	24	Dalonte Wallace	Jr
LB	26	John Syty	Sr
DB	27	Kyle Sims	Fr
DB	28	Dwellie Striggles	Fr
DB	29	Adam Redden	So
DB	30	Okoye Houston	So
DB	31	Carlos Lammons	So
LB	33	Scott Pettigrew	Jr
LB	35	Mark Richardson	Jr
LB	36	Lee Skinner	Fr
DB	38	Whitney Sherry	Fr
DB	39	Najja Johnson	So
DL	40	Steven Means	Jr
DB	41	Romel Dismuke	So
LB	42	Fred Branch	Sr
LB	44	Jaleel Verser	Jr
DL	45	Terry Peden	Jr
LB	46	Khalil Mack	So
LB	47	Imani Chatman	Sr
LB	48	Willie Moseley	Jr
DB	49	Keith Takeh	Fr
LB	52	Jake Stockman	Fr
DL	54	Richie Smith	Sr
LB	59	Shaquille Dudley	So
DL	90	Kristjan Sokoli	Fr
DL	91	Dalton Barksdale	Fr
LB	92	Kendall Roberson	Fr
DL	95	Desmond Howard	Fr
DL	96	Colby Way	So
DL	97	Wyatt Cahill	Jr
DL	98	Rashad Jean	Jr
DL	99	Gordon DuBois	Sr

Special teams

Pos.	#	Name	Class
P/PK	13	Peter Fardon	Sr
P	16	Jacob Schum	Jr
LS	58	Tim Krantz	So
LS/DE	63	Ryan O'Sullivan	Fr

Head coach

- Jeff Quinn

Coordinators/assistant coaches

- Alex Wood (Offensive Coordinator)
- William Inge (Defensive Coordinator)
- Ernest T. Jones
- Don Patterson
- Mike Dietzel
- Jappy Oliver
- Mike Daniels
- Charley Molnar
- Scott Pilkey

Legend

- (C) Team captain
- (S) Suspended
- (I) Ineligible
- Injured
- Redshirt

Roster
Last update: November 15, 2023

=== Recruiting ===
Name	Position	Height	Weight	Hometown
Dalton Barksdale	Defensive end	6'3"	240	Detroit, MI
Dante Burton	Tight end	6'4"	236	Lodi, NJ
Jasen Carlson	Offensive lineman	6'3"	295	Lakewood, NY
Andre Davis	Defensive tackle	6'4"	275	Cheektowaga, NY
Cordero Dixon	Wide receiver	6'1"	185	Suwanee, GA
Delano Fabor	Cornerback	6'0"	193	Buffalo, NY
Okoye Houston	Safety	6'0"	185	Greenville, SC
Devon Hughes	Wide Receiver	6'0"	185	Tyrone, GA
Rudy Johnson	Quarterback	6'1"	195	Owings Mills, MD
Cortney Lester	Wide Receiver	5'11"	175	Miramar, FL
Jack Molloy	Punter/Placekicker	6'2"	200	Harrison, NY
James Potts	Running back	5'11	190	Boynton Beach, FL
Adam Redden	Wide Receiver	6'0"	185	Amherst, NY
Kendall Roberson	Linebacker	6'2"	215	Decatur, GA
Witney Sherry	Safety	6'1"	180	Miami, FL
Jake Silas	Offensive Lineman	6'8"	270	Portland, MI
Kristjan Sokoli	Defensive end	6'5"	230	Bloomfield, NJ
Dwellie Striggles	Cornerback	5'10"	170	Lauderhill, FL
Jeff Veinotte	Offensive Lineman	6'5"	305	Ottawa, ON
Aaron Walters	Wide Receiver	6'1"	180	Hopkins, SC
Tyler Warden	Quarterback	6'7"	215	Glen Ellyn, IL
Colby Way	Linebacker	6'3"	235	State College, PA
Alex Zordich	Quarterback	6'3"	215	Youngstown, OH

== After the season ==
=== NFL draft ===
The following Bull was selected in the 2011 NFL draft following the season.

Round	Pick	Player	Position	NFL club
5	143	Josh Thomas	Defensive back	Dallas Cowboys
