= 2010 Toledo Rockets football team =

American college football season

2010 Toledo Rockets football

Little Caesars Pizza Bowl, L 32–34 vs. FIU
- Conference: Mid-American Conference
- West
- Record: 8–5 (7–1 MAC)
- Head coach: Tim Beckman (2nd season)
- Offensive coordinator: Matt Campbell (2nd season)
- Offensive scheme: Spread
- Co-defensive coordinators: Mike Ward (2nd season); Paul Nichols (2nd season)
- Base defense: 4–2–5
- Home stadium: Glass Bowl

2010 Mid-American Conference football standings
	Conf.			Overall
Team	W		L	W		L
East Division
Miami (OH) x$	7	–	1	10	–	4
Ohio	6	–	2	8	–	5
Temple	5	–	3	8	–	4
Kent State	4	–	4	5	–	7
Bowling Green	1	–	7	2	–	10
Buffalo	1	–	7	2	–	10
Akron	1	–	7	1	–	11
West Division
Northern Illinois x	8	–	0	11	–	3
Toledo	7	–	1	8	–	5
Western Michigan	5	–	3	6	–	6
Ball State	3	–	5	4	–	8
Central Michigan	2	–	6	3	–	9
Eastern Michigan	2	–	6	2	–	10
Championship: Miami 26, Northern Illinois 21
$ – Conference champion; x – Division champion/co-champions

The 2010 Toledo Rockets football team represented the University of Toledo during the 2010 NCAA Division I FBS football season. The Rockets, led by second-year head coach Tim Beckman, compete in the West Division of the Mid-American Conference and played their home games at the Glass Bowl. They finished the season 8–5, 7–1 in MAC play and were invited to the Little Caesars Pizza Bowl where they were defeated by Sun Belt champion Florida International 32–34.

== Schedule ==
Date	Time	Opponent	Site	TV	Result	Attendance
September 3	8:00 p.m.	Arizona*	Glass Bowl; Toledo, OH	ESPN	L 2–41	25,907
September 11	7:00 p.m.	at Ohio	Peden Stadium; Athens, OH		W 20–13	19,455
September 18	7:00 p.m.	at Western Michigan	Waldo Stadium; Kalamazoo, MI		W 37–24	14,216
September 25	12:00 p.m.	at Purdue*	Ross–Ade Stadium; West Lafayette, IN	BTN	W 31–20	42,068
October 2	7:00 p.m.	Wyoming*	Glass Bowl; Toledo, OH	BCSN	L 15–20	20,843
October 9	8:00 p.m.	at No. 4 Boise State*	Bronco Stadium; Boise, ID	ESPN3	L 14–57	33,833
October 16	7:00 p.m.	Kent State	Glass Bowl; Toledo, OH		W 34–21	20,048
October 23	7:00 p.m.	Ball State	Glass Bowl; Toledo, OH		W 31–24	15,010
October 30	4:00 p.m.	at Eastern Michigan	Rynearson Stadium; Ypsilanti, MI		W 42–7	25,860
November 9	7:00 p.m.	at Northern Illinois	Huskie Stadium; DeKalb, IL	ESPN2	L 30–65	18,472
November 17	8:00 p.m.	Bowling Green	Glass Bowl; Toledo, OH (Battle of I-75)	ESPN2	W 33–14	22,071
November 26	2:00 p.m.	Central Michigan	Glass Bowl; Toledo, OH	ESPN3	W 42–31	12,121
December 26	8:30 p.m.	vs. Florida International*	Ford Field; Detroit, MI (Little Caesars Pizza Bowl)	ESPN	L 32–34	32,431
*Non-conference game; Rankings from Coaches' Poll released prior to the game; All times are in Eastern time
