= 2010 Ball State Cardinals football team =

American college football season

2010 Ball State Cardinals football
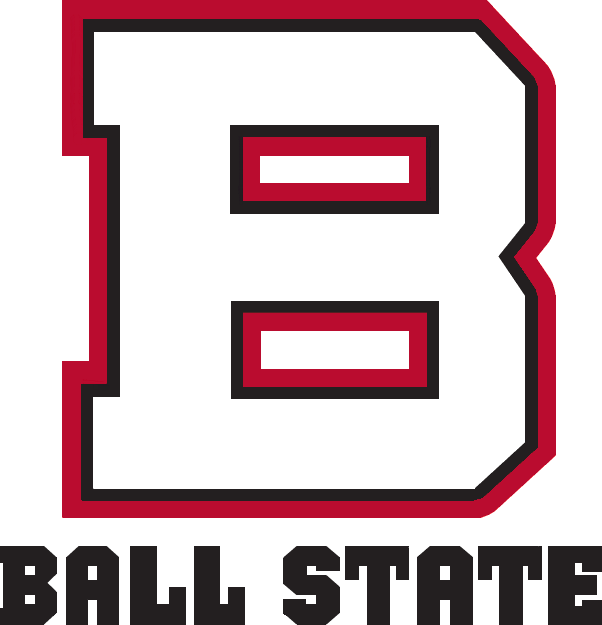
- Conference: Mid-American Conference
- West
- Record: 4–8 (3–5 MAC)
- Head coach: Stan Parrish (2nd full season)
- Offensive coordinator: Eddie Faulkner (2nd season)
- Defensive coordinator: Jay Hood (1st season)
- Home stadium: Scheumann Stadium

2010 Mid-American Conference football standings
	Conf.			Overall
Team	W		L	W		L
East Division
Miami (OH) x$	7	–	1	10	–	4
Ohio	6	–	2	8	–	5
Temple	5	–	3	8	–	4
Kent State	4	–	4	5	–	7
Bowling Green	1	–	7	2	–	10
Buffalo	1	–	7	2	–	10
Akron	1	–	7	1	–	11
West Division
Northern Illinois x	8	–	0	11	–	3
Toledo	7	–	1	8	–	5
Western Michigan	5	–	3	6	–	6
Ball State	3	–	5	4	–	8
Central Michigan	2	–	6	3	–	9
Eastern Michigan	2	–	6	2	–	10
Championship: Miami 26, Northern Illinois 21
$ – Conference champion; x – Division champion/co-champions

The 2010 Ball State Cardinals football team represented Ball State University during the 2010 NCAA Division I FBS football season. The Cardinals, led by second-year head coach Stan Parrish, competed in the West Division of the Mid-American Conference and played their home games at Scheumann Stadium. They finished their season 4–8, 3–5 in conference play. Parrish was fired at the end of the season.

== Schedule ==
Date	Time	Opponent	Site	TV	Result	Attendance
September 2	7:00 pm	SE Missouri State*	Scheumann Stadium; Muncie, IN		W 27–10	10,753
September 11	7:00 pm	No. 18 (FCS) Liberty*	Scheumann Stadium; Muncie, IN		L 23–27	9,110
September 18	12:00 pm	at Purdue*	Ross–Ade Stadium; West Lafayette, IN	BTN	L 13–24	54,124
September 25	12:00 pm	at No. 18 Iowa*	Kinnick Stadium; Iowa City, IA	BTN	L 0–45	70,585
October 2	3:30 pm	at Central Michigan	Kelly/Shorts Stadium; Mount Pleasant, MI		W 31–17	20,152
October 9	12:00 pm	Western Michigan^{†}	Scheumann Stadium; Muncie, IN	ESPN+	L 16–45	11,963
October 16	1:00 pm	Eastern Michigan	Scheumann Stadium; Muncie, IN		L 38–41 ^{OT}	10,956
October 23	7:00 pm	at Toledo	Glass Bowl; Toledo, OH		L 24–31	15,010
October 30	2:00 pm	at Kent State	Dix Stadium; Kent, OH		L 14–33	15,468
November 6	1:00 pm	Akron	Scheumann Stadium; Muncie, IN		W 37–30 ^{2OT}	5,377
November 12	6:00 pm	at Buffalo	University at Buffalo Stadium; Buffalo, NY	ESPNU	W 20–3	11,355
November 20	12:00 pm	Northern Illinois	Scheumann Stadium; Muncie, IN (Bronze Stalk Trophy)		L 21–59	5,524
*Non-conference game; ^{†}Homecoming; Rankings from Coaches' Poll released prior to the game; All times are in Eastern time
