= 2010 Ohio Bobcats football team =

American college football season

2010 Ohio Bobcats football

New Orleans Bowl, L 21–48 vs. Troy
- Conference: Mid-American Conference
- East
- Record: 8–5 (6–2 MAC)
- Head coach: Frank Solich (6th season)
- Co-offensive coordinators: Tim Albin (6th season); Gerry Gdowski (2nd season)
- Defensive coordinator: Jim Burrow (6th season)
- Home stadium: Peden Stadium

2010 Mid-American Conference football standings
	Conf.			Overall
Team	W		L	W		L
East Division
Miami (OH) x$	7	–	1	10	–	4
Ohio	6	–	2	8	–	5
Temple	5	–	3	8	–	4
Kent State	4	–	4	5	–	7
Bowling Green	1	–	7	2	–	10
Buffalo	1	–	7	2	–	10
Akron	1	–	7	1	–	11
West Division
Northern Illinois x	8	–	0	11	–	3
Toledo	7	–	1	8	–	5
Western Michigan	5	–	3	6	–	6
Ball State	3	–	5	4	–	8
Central Michigan	2	–	6	3	–	9
Eastern Michigan	2	–	6	2	–	10
Championship: Miami 26, Northern Illinois 21
$ – Conference champion; x – Division champion/co-champions

The 2010 Ohio Bobcats football team represented Ohio University during the 2010 NCAA Division I FBS football season. The Bobcats, led by sixth-year head coach Frank Solich, competed in the East Division of the Mid-American Conference and played their home games at Peden Stadium. They finished the season 8–5, 6–2 in MAC play and were invited to the New Orleans Bowl where they were defeated by Troy 21–48.

== Schedule ==
Date	Time	Opponent	Site	TV	Result	Attendance
September 4	7:00 p.m.	Wofford*	Peden Stadium; Athens, OH		W 33–10	22,955
September 11	7:00 p.m.	Toledo	Peden Stadium; Athens, OH		L 13–20	19,455
September 18	12:00 p.m.	at No. 2 Ohio State*	Ohio Stadium; Columbus, OH	BTN	L 7–43	105,075
September 25	7:00 p.m.	at Marshall*	Joan C. Edwards Stadium; Huntington, WV (Battle for the Bell)	WSAZ	L 23–24	28,143
October 2	12:00 p.m.	at Eastern Michigan	Rynearson Stadium; Ypsilanti, MI	ESPN+	W 30–17	16,753
October 9	2:00 p.m.	Bowling Green	Peden Stadium; Athens, OH		W 49–25	19,855
October 16	2:00 p.m.	Akron^{†}	Peden Stadium; Athens, OH		W 38–10	21,645
October 23	1:00 p.m.	at Miami (OH)	Yager Stadium; Oxford, OH (Battle of the Bricks)		W 34–13	17,144
October 30	2:00 p.m.	Louisiana-Lafayette*	Peden Stadium; Athens, OH		W 38–31	15,255
November 4	7:30 p.m.	Buffalo	Peden Stadium; Athens, OH	ESPNU	W 34–17	15,112
November 16	8:00 p.m.	at Temple	Lincoln Financial Field; Philadelphia, PA	ESPN2	W 31–23	16,433
November 26	11:00 a.m.	at Kent State	Dix Stadium; Kent, OH	ESPNU	L 6–28	8,340
December 18	9:00 p.m.	vs. Troy*	Louisiana Superdome; New Orleans, LA (New Orleans Bowl)	ESPN	L 21–48	29,159
*Non-conference game; ^{†}Homecoming; Rankings from Coaches' Poll released prior to the game; All times are in Eastern time
