= 2010 Army Black Knights football team =

American college football season

2010 Army Black Knights football

Armed Forces Bowl champion

Armed Forces Bowl, W 16–14 vs. SMU
- Conference: Independent
- Record: 7–6
- Head coach: Rich Ellerson (2nd season)
- Offensive coordinator: Ian Shields (2nd season)
- Offensive scheme: Triple option
- Co-defensive coordinators: Payam Saadat (2nd season); Chris Smeland (2nd season)
- Base defense: Double Eagle Flex
- Captains: Stephen Anderson; Carson Homme; Josh McNary; Patrick Mealy
- Home stadium: Michie Stadium

2010 NCAA Division I FBS independents football records
	Conf.			Overall
Team	W		L	W		L
Navy		–		9	–	4
Notre Dame		–		8	–	5
Army		–		7	–	6
Rankings from AP Poll

The 2010 Army Black Knights football team represented the United States Military Academy as an independent in the 2010 NCAA Division I FBS football season. The Black Knights, led by second-year head coach Rich Ellerson played their home games at the Michie Stadium.

By winning six regular season games, Army became bowl-eligible for the first time since the 1996 season. They were invited to the Armed Forces Bowl in University Park, Texas, replacing a team from the Mountain West Conference. They defeated SMU, 16–14, in the bowl game to finish the season 7–6, their first winning season since 1996.

== Schedule ==
Date	Time	Opponent	Site	TV	Result	Attendance	Source
September 4	7:00 p.m.	at Eastern Michigan	Rynearson Stadium; Ypsilanti, MI		W 31–27	11,318	
September 11	12:00 p.m.	Hawaii	Michie Stadium; West Point, NY	CBSCS	L 28–31	30,042	
September 18	12:00 p.m.	North Texas	Michie Stadium; West Point, NY	CBSCS	W 24–0	24,689	
September 25	3:00 p.m.	at Duke	Wallace Wade Stadium; Durham, NC	ESPN3	W 35–21	27,289	
October 2	12:00 p.m.	Temple	Michie Stadium; West Point, NY	CBSCS	L 35–42	33,065	
October 9	3:30 p.m.	at Tulane	Louisiana Superdome; New Orleans, LA		W 41–23	28,756	
October 16	2:00 p.m.	vs. Rutgers	New Meadowlands Stadium; East Rutherford, NJ	ESPN3	L 20–23 ^{OT}	41,292	
October 30	12:00 p.m.	VMI	Michie Stadium; West Point, NY	CBSCS	W 29–7	32,410	
November 6	12:00 p.m.	Air Force	Michie Stadium; West Point, NY	CBSCS	L 22–42	38,128	
November 13	2:00 p.m.	at Kent State	Dix Stadium; Kent, OH		W 45–28	17,222	
November 20	7:00 p.m.	vs. Notre Dame	Yankee Stadium; Bronx, NY (rivalry)	NBC	L 3–27	54,251	
December 11	2:30 p.m.	vs. Navy	Lincoln Financial Field; Philadelphia, PA (Army–Navy Game, Commander-in-Chief's Trophy)	CBS	L 17–31	69,223	
December 30	12:00 p.m.	at SMU	Gerald J. Ford Stadium; University Park, TX (Armed Forces Bowl)	ESPN	W 16–14	36,742	
All times are in Eastern time

== Game summaries ==
=== Eastern Michigan ===
	1	2	3	4	Total
Black Knights	7	7	10	7	31
Eagles	7	7	6	7	27

The Black Knights defeated the Eastern Michigan Eagles for the third consecutive year, this being the second of the three decided by less than a touchdown. The game was tied twice and there were three lead changes. The teams combined for 594 yards rushing and only 96 yards passing. The game was delayed for about 12 minutes early in the second quarter when the public address system, the scoreboard, and the lights on the west (pressbox) side of the stadium went out. The lights eventually regained power, but the scoreboard and public address system remained inoperable for the remainder of the game. Notable performances included Army running back Jared Hassin's three touchdowns, 142 yards rushing by EMU's Dwayne Priest, and 126 yards rushing by EMU quarterback Alex Gillett.

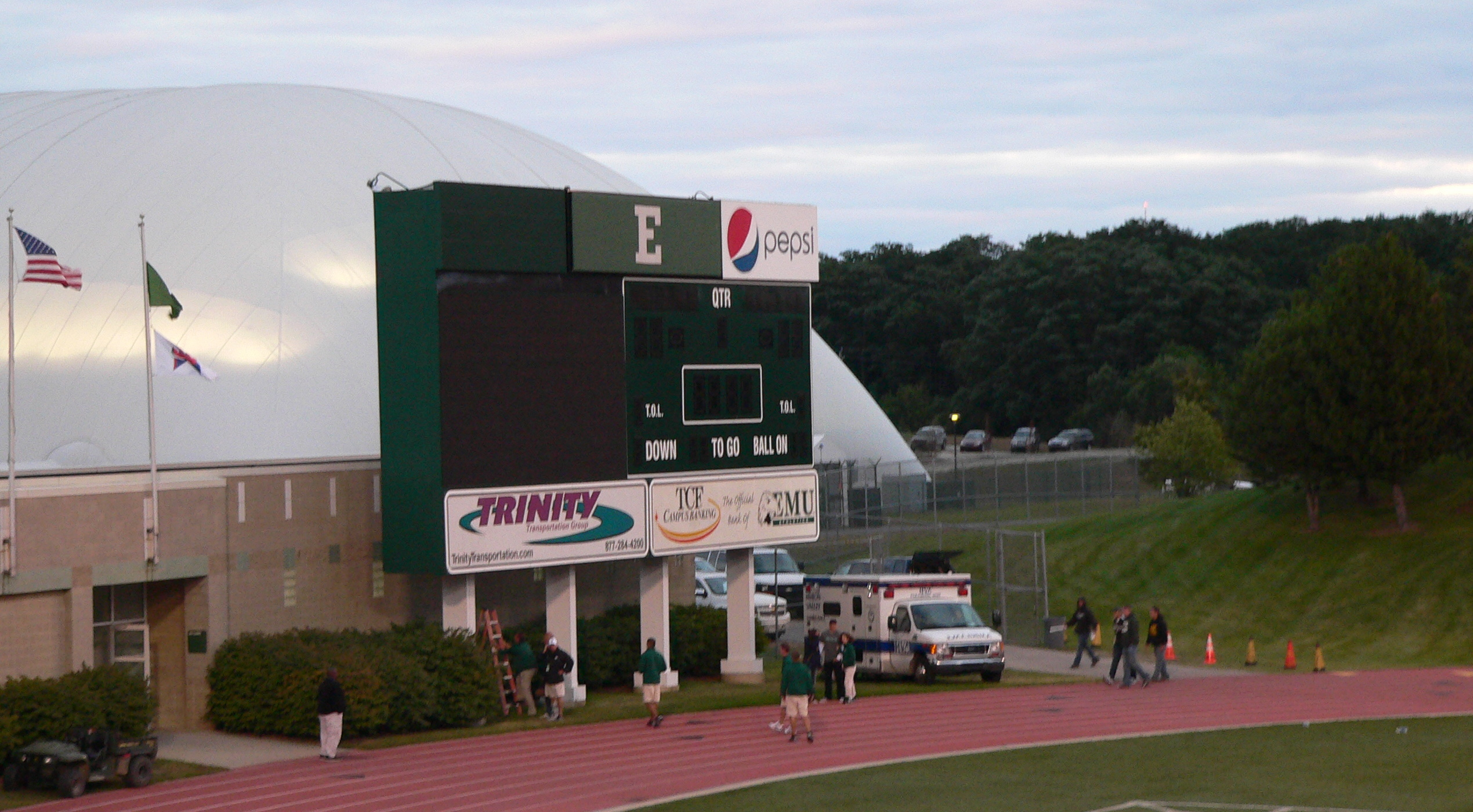
The scoreboard lost power early in the second quarter, and was not used for the remainder of the game.

Scoring summary

1st quarter

- 14:56 EMU – Dwayne Priest 5-yard run (Sean Graham kick) 0–7 EMU
- 6:01 Army – Jared Hassin 3-yard run (Alex Carlton kick) 7–7

2nd quarter

- 1:00 Army – Jared Hassin 3-yard run (Alex Carlton kick) 14–7 Army
- 0:35 EMU – Dwayne Priest 5-yard run (Sean Graham kick) 14–14

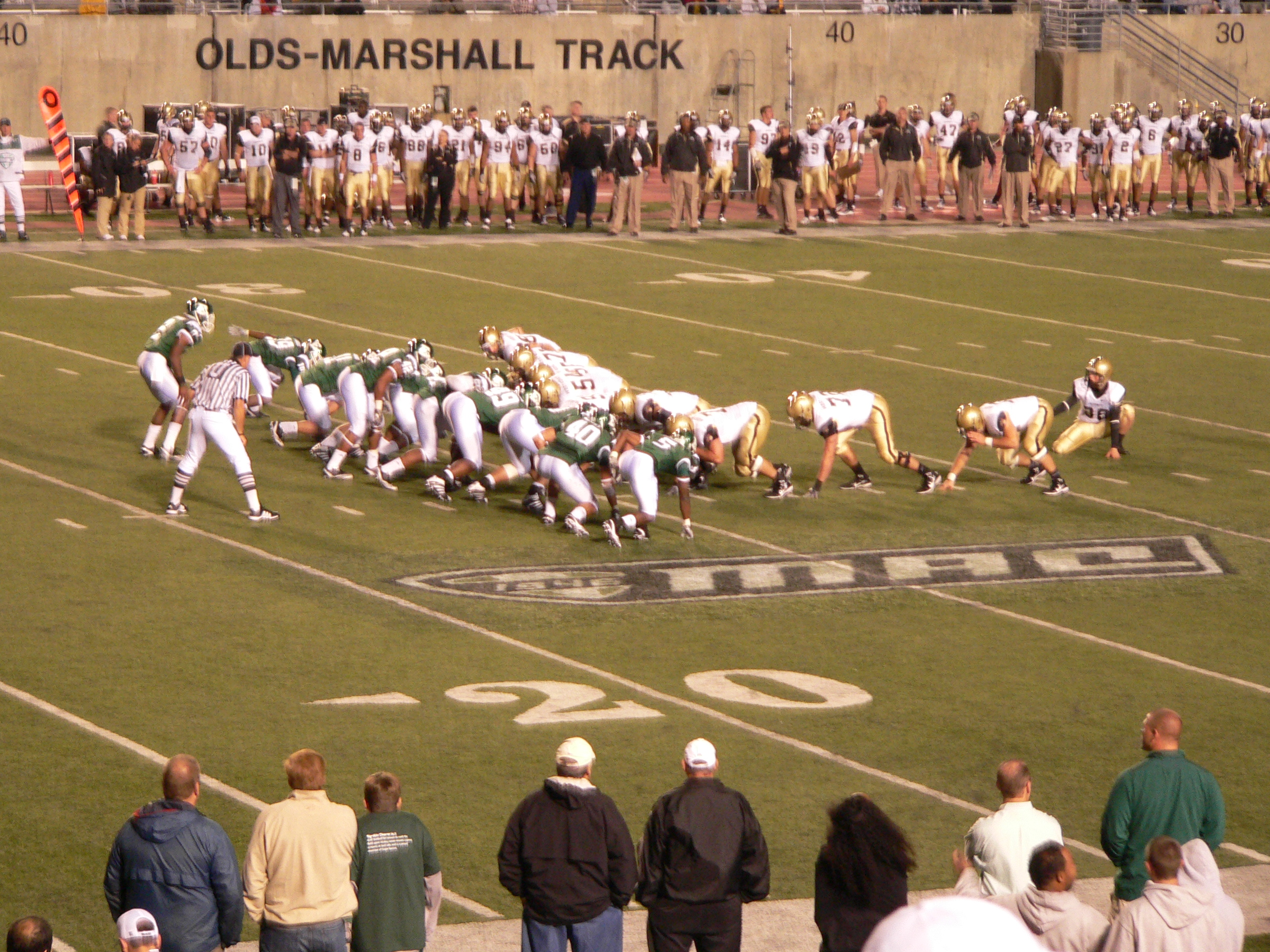
Army lines up for a field goal attempt early in the third quarter. The kick was good, giving the Black Knights a 24–14 lead, the biggest of the night.

3rd quarter

- 14:55 Army – Patrick Mealy 11-yard run (Alex Carlton kick) 21–14 Army
- 10:30 Army – Alex Carlton 42-yard field goal 24–14 Army
- 8:25 EMU – Alex Gillett 1-yard run (Sean Graham kick failed) 24–20 Army

4th quarter

- 3:03 EMU – Ben Thayer 10-yard pass from Alex Gillett (Sean Graham kick) 24–27 EMU
- 0:44 Army – Jared Hassin 7-yard run (Alex Carlton kick) 31–27 Army

=== Hawaii ===
	1	2	3	4	Total
Warriors	14	7	7	3	31
Black Knights	0	7	21	0	28

Scott Enos kicked a 31-yard field goal with 7 seconds remaining in the game to propel Hawai'i to a 31–28 come-from-behind victory over Army. The game was head coach Rich Ellerson's first against his alma mater. Hawai'i jumped out to a 21–0 lead on quarterback Bryant Moniz's three touchdown passes. But Army rallied with four straight touchdowns of its own, including two by Malcom Brown. The Rainbow Warriors had the final say as they scored late in the third quarter to tie the game. Army was positioning itself for a game-winning field goal when backup quarterback Max Jenkins fumbled the ball while trying to run to the middle of the field to gain position for a field goal attempt. The ball was recovered by the Hawai'i defense. The offense then drove down the field and set up the winning kick.

Moniz finished the game with 343 yards passing to go with his three TD passes. Kealoha Pilares caught 6 passes for 104 yards and a touchdown. The Black Knights gained 250 yards on the ground and were led by fullback Jared Hassin's 83 yards rushing to go along with 1 touchdown carry.

Scoring summary

First quarter

- 10:29 Hawaii – Royce Pollard 26 yd pass from Bryant Moniz (Scott Enos kick) – 7–0 Hawaii
- 06:52 Hawaii – Rodney Bradley 11 yd pass from Bryant Moniz (Scott Enos kick) – 14–0 Hawaii

Second quarter

- 11:31 Hawaii – Kealoha Pilares 48 yd pass from Bryant Moniz (Scott Enos kick) – 21–0 Hawaii
- 04:30 Army – Malcolm Brown 4 yd run (Alex Carlton kick) – 21–7 Hawaii

Third quarter

- 11:06 Army – Jared Hassin 16 yd run (Alex Carlton kick) 21–14 Hawaii
- 07:10 Army – Malcolm Brown 1 yd run (Alex Carlton kick) 21–21 Hawaii
- 05:35 Army – Max Jenkins 1 yd run (Alex Carlton kick) 21–28 Army
- 03:52 Hawaii – Alex Green 3 yd run (Scott Enos kick) 28–28

Fourth quarter

- 00:07 Hawaii – Scott Enos 31 yd FG – 31–28 Hawaii

=== North Texas ===
	1	2	3	4	Total
Mean Green	0	0	0	0	0
Black Knights	7	7	7	3	24

Army improved to 2–1 on the season with its first shutout since 2005 with a 24–0 win over North Texas. Seven Army players ran for a total of 292 yards. Short TD runs by Patrick Mealy (9 yards) and Malcolm Brown (2 yards) put the Black Knights up 14–0 at halftime. Army quarterback Trent Steelman also carried the ball 11 times for 68 yards and a rushing touchdown while throwing for 45 yards through the air.

North Texas entered the game 23rd in the country in passing with an average of 282.5 yards per game, but was held to just 106 yards and threw 2 interceptions. The Mean Green entered the game starting backup quarterback Derek Thompson. However, Thompson was knocked out of the game with a season-ending broken leg in the second quarter. UNT was forced to finish the game with former wide receiver Riley Rodge at quarterback. Army senior DE Josh McNary had two sacks, tying the school record for 42 career tackles for loss.

Scoring summary

First quarter

- 11:01 Army – Patrick Mealy 9 Yd Run (Alex Carlton Kick) 7–0 Army

Second quarter

- 04:57 Army – Malcolm Brown 2 Yd Run (Alex Carlton Kick) 14–0 Army

Third quarter

- 05:52 Army – Trent Steelman 20 Yd Run (Alex Carlton Kick) 21–0 Army

Fourth quarter

- 12:24 Army – Alex Carlton 23 Yd FG 24–0 Army

=== Duke ===
	1	2	3	4	Total
Black Knights	14	7	14	0	35
Blue Devils	7	0	0	14	21

Army secured its best start to a season, at 3–1, since beginning the 1996 season with a 9–0 record in a 35–21 win at Duke. The Black Knights got off to a 14–0 start after short TD runs by Brian Cobbs and quarterback Trent Steelman and never looked back. Cobbs finished the game with 2 touchdown runs and Army 248 yards rushing while the Black Knights took advantage of 5 Duke turnovers. Steelman accounted for 62 of Army's rushing yards as well as threw for 85 including his first 2 TD passes of the season to go along with his rushing score.

Conner Vernon had 8 catches for 129 yards and a TD catch. Although quarterback Sean Renfree threw for 261 yards and two scores he was hampered by 3 interceptions. Army nearly doubled up Duke in time-of-possession with the Black Knights holding a 39.57–20.03 advantage for the contest. The win for the Black Knights ended a seven-game losing streak against ACC opponents.

Scoring summary

First quarter

- 13:51 Army – Brian Cobbs 3 yd run (Alex Carlton kick) 7–0 Army
- 05:37 Army – Trent Steelman 1 yd run (Alex Carlton kick) 14–0 Army
- 01:33 Duke – Brandon "Clavinet" Connette 10 yd run (Will Snyderwine kick) 14–7 Army

Second quarter

- 05:27 Army – Brian Cobbs 4 yd run (Alex Carlton kick) 21–7 Army

Third quarter

- 12:35 Army – Raymond Maples 34 Yd Pass From Trent Steelman (Alex Carlton Kick) 28–7 Army
- 06:31 Army – Austin Barr 31 Yd Pass From Trent Steelman (Alex Carlton Kick) 35–7 Army

Fourth quarter

- 14:52 Duke – Conner Vernon 58 Yd Pass From Sean Renfree (Will Snyderwine Kick) 35–14 Army
- 01:41 Duke – Brandon Braxton 21 Yd Pass From Sean Renfree (Will Snyderwine Kick) 35–21 Army

=== Temple ===
	1	2	3	4	Total
Owls	13	0	8	21	42
Black Knights	7	14	7	7	35

Playing without star tailback Bernard Pierce, Matt Brown picked up the slack and rushed for 226 yards on 28 carries and scored 4 touchdowns as Temple rallied to defeat Army 42–35. Army had a 15-point lead on the Owls through the midpoint in the 3rd quarter backed by three Trent Steelman touchdown runs and one touchdown pass. But Temple would score 29 straight points including 2 touchdown runs by Brown to pull away from the Black Knights.

Steelman would end the game with 4 TD runs to go along with his 1 throwing score. He would rush for a total of 65 yards and throw for another 124. Army's leading rusher for the game was Malcom Brown who carried for 71 yards. Temple would shred the Black Knights for 407 yards of total offense. Quarterback Chester Stewart would pass for 127 yards and 1 TD pass.

Scoring summary

First quarter

- 13:04 Army – Trent Steelman 2 Yd Run (Alex Carlton Kick) 0–7 Army
- 09:55 Temple – Matt Brown 3 Yd Run (Two-Point Run Conversion Failed) 6–7 Army
- 04:05 Temple – Matt Brown 42 Yd Run (Brandon McManus Kick) 13–7 Temple

Second quarter

- 09:08 Army – Trent Steelman 7 Yd Run (Alex Carlton Kick) 13–14 Army
- 02:07 Army – Austin Barr 31 Yd Pass From Trent Steelman (Alex Carlton Kick) 13–21 Army

Third quarter

- 08:05 Army – Trent Steelman 3 Yd Run (Alex Carlton Kick) 13–28 Army
- 06:00 Temple – Michael Campbell 24 Yd Pass From Joe Jones (Chester Stewart Pass To Vaughn Charlton For Two-Point Conversion) 21–28 Army

Fourth quarter

- 14:29 Temple – Michael Campbell 8 Yd Pass From Chester Stewart (Brandon Mcmanus Kick) 28–28
- 06:46 Temple – Matt Brown 11 Yd Run (Brandon Mcmanus Kick) 35–28 Temple
- 04:20 Temple – Matt Brown 20 Yd Run (Brandon Mcmanus Kick) 42–28 Temple
- 01:13 Army – Trent Steelman 5 Yd Run (Alex Carlton Kick) 42–35 Temple

=== Tulane ===
	1	2	3	4	Total
Black Knights	7	17	7	10	41
Green Wave	7	0	0	16	23

Army won its third road game of the season in a 41–23 victory at the Louisiana Superdome against Tulane. The win gave the Black Knights their first season since 1967 in which the team won 3 away games in one year. Although only halfway through the current season, the 41 point scoring outburst also was good enough to surpass Army's season point total from 2009. Jared Hassin paced Army with 144 yards rushing and 2 TD runs. Quarterback Trent Steelman also rushed for 85 yards and a score while also throwing a touchdown pass to Davyd Brooks. Steelman only needed to attempt 5 passes all game as the Black Knights torched the Green Wave for 312 yards rushing.

Tulane QB Ryan Griffin did throw for 211 yards on the day and three TD passes, however two of the scores came when the game was already out of reach. Casey Robottom led the Green Wave receiving corps with 6 grabs for 63 yards and a touchdown. Army once again won the turnover battle for the game, only losing 1 fumble while recovering 3 Tulane fumbles.

Scoring summary

First quarter

- 08:10 Army – Jared Hassin 9 Yd Run (Alex Carlton Kick) 7–0 Army
- 01:23 Tulane – Casey Robottom 6 Yd Pass From Ryan Griffin (Cairo Santos Kick) 7–7

Second quarter

- 09:37 Army – Davyd Brooks 8 Yd Pass From Trent Steelman (Alex Carlton Kick) 14–7 Army
- 07:29 Army – Alex Carlton 35 Yd FG 17–7 Army
- 01:59 Army – Trent Steelman 1 Yd Run (Alex Carlton Kick) 24–7 Army

Third quarter

- 07:11 Army – Jared Hassin 7 Yd Run (Alex Carlton Kick) 31–7 Army

Fourth quarter

- 14:16 Tulane – D.J. Banks 5 Yd Pass From Ryan Griffin (Ryan Griffin Pass To Casey Robottom For Two-Point Conversion) 31–15 Army
- 09:46 Army – Alex Carlton 33 Yd FG 34–15 Army
- 02:32 Tulane – Casey Robottom 5 Yd Pass From Ryan Griffin (Orleans Darkwa Run For Two-Point Conversion) 34–23 Army
- 01:42 Army – Brian Cobbs 6 Yd Run (Alex Carlton Kick) 41–23 Army

=== Rutgers ===
	1	2	3	4	OT	Total
Black Knights	7	10	0	0	3	20
Scarlet Knights	0	3	0	14	6	23

Army dominated the first half of the contest staking a 17–3 lead at halftime but Rutgers would score 2 touchdowns in the 4th quarter en route to a 23–20 overtime win. The lead storyline of the game, however, would surround Rutgers defensive tackle Eric LeGrand, who was paralyzed from the neck down after making a tackle on kickoff return coverage in the 4th quarter of the contest. Rutgers quarterback, Chas Dodd, making his first career start for the Scarlet Knights led the comeback with 251 yards passing and two touchdown tosses. Army was paced by fullback Jared Hassin and quarterback Trent Steelman, both of whom, ran for over 100 yards and each scored a touchdown. Steelman also threw for 115 yards through the air.

In the overtime session Dodd hit Keith Stroud on third-and-6 to reach the 3-yard line, setting up Joe Martinek's winning 1-yard run two plays later. Army had driven down the field in their overtime possession but a broken play on a third-and-short led to a 1-yard loss by Steelman forcing the field goal. Army dominated Rutgers in total yardage holding a 404–250 advantage. The Black Knights also sacked Dodd a total of eight times including three by Josh McNary. However, Army was uncharacteristically penalized eight times for 94 total yards. Rutgers was held to −1 yards rushing for the game. The contest marked the first College Football game to be played at the New Meadowlands Stadium.

Scoring summary

First quarter

- 02:45 Army – Trent Steelman 3 Yd Run. (Alex Carlton Kick) 0–7 Army

Second quarter

- 10:46 Rutgers – San San Te 19 Yd FG 3–7 Army
- 08:02 Army – Jared Hassin 5 Yd Run. (Alex Carlton Kick) 3–14 Army
- 00:00 Army – Alex Carlton 21 Yd FG 3–17 Army

Third quarter

No Scoring

Fourth quarter

- 14:57 Rutgers – Kordell Young 3 Yd Pass From Chas Dodd. (San San Te Kick) 10–17 Army
- 05:16 Rutgers – Mark Harrison 16 Yd Pass From Chas Dodd. (San San Te Kick) 17–17

Overtime

- Army – Alex Carlton 26 Yd FG 17–20 Army
- Rutgers – Joe Martinek 1 Yd Run. 23–20 Rutgers

=== VMI ===
	1	2	3	4	Total
Keydets	0	0	7	0	7
Black Knights	7	12	0	10	29

Jared Hassin ran for a career-high 158 yards and scored a touchdown as the Black Knights came within one victory of bowl eligibility with a 29–7 victory over VMI. Hassin also led Army in receiving for the game with 3 catches for 54 yards. The Black Knights defense held the Keydets to just one score and only 282 yards of total offense. They also scored their first points on defense this season as well as their first defensive touchdown. The first points by the defense came in the second quarter when the Keydets were called for a holding penalty in their own end zone giving the defense credit for a safety. Then with just under 9 minutes left in the game the Black Knights sealed the win with a Donovan Travis interception at the Army 21, Travis then scrambled through traffic, and flipped a lateral to Jordan Trimble while falling to his knees. Trimble raced the final 42 yards, making it 29–7. VMI quarterback Eric Kordenbrock threw for 139 yards and Chaz Jones ran for 72 along with scoring their only touchdown of the day.

Scoring summary

First quarter

- 04:08 Army – Trent Steelman 1 Yd Run (Alex Carlton Kick) 7–0 Army

Second quarter

- 14:20 Army – Jared Hassin 38 Yd Run (Alex Carlton Kick) 14–0 Army
- 02:35 Army – Penalty On D'Angelo Smith In End Zone-Safety 16–0 Army
- 00:21 Army – Alex Carlton 43 Yd FG 19–0 Army

Third quarter

- 04:18 VMI – Chaz Jones 1 Yd Run (Jeff Sexton Kick) 19–7 Army

Fourth quarter

- 12:15 Army – Alex Carlton 41 Yd FG 22–7 Army
- 08:56 Army – Jordan Trimble 42 Yd Interception Return (Alex Carlton Kick) 29–7 Army

=== Air Force ===
	1	2	3	4	Total
Falcons	0	21	7	14	42
Black Knights	6	7	3	6	22

Air Force quarterback Tim Jefferson completed just 3 passes but they went for a combined 124 yards and 2 of them resulted in touchdowns as Air Force won their first Commander-in-Chief's Trophy since 2002. The Trophy was AFA's 17th outright one. Jefferson also rushed for 57 yards and two scores on the ground. Jonathan Warzeka caught both of Jefferson's TD passes and had 116 yards receiving after catching one pass for 53 yards and the other for 63. Army's Jared Hassin led all rushers with 114 yards on 17 carries. Army quarterback Trent Steelman threw for 81 yards and a touchdown but also recorded his first interception of the season. Prior to the INT Army was the last remaining Football Bowl Subdivision team without an interception on the year. Alex Carlton was 3 for 3 in kicking field goals on the day.

Scoring summary

First quarter

- 08:55 Army – Alex Carlton 30 Yd FG 0–3 Army
- 04:50 Army – Alex Carlton 41 Yd FG 0–6 Army

Second quarter

- 14:24 Air Force – Tim Jefferson 3 Yd Run (Erik Soderberg Kick) 7–6 Air Force
- 10:00 Air Force – Jonathan Warzeka 53 Yd Pass From Tim Jefferson (Erik Soderberg Kick) 14–6 Air Force
- 06:17 Army – Jacob Bohn 18 Yd Run (Alex Carlton Kick) 14–13 Air Force
- 00:14 Air Force – Nathan Walker 2 Yd Run (Erik Soderberg Kick) 21–13 Air Force

Third quarter

- 02:22 Army – Alex Carlton 46 Yd FG 21–16 Air Force
- 00:44 Air Force – Jonathan Warzeka 63 Yd Pass From Tim Jefferson (Erik Soderberg Kick) 28–16 Air Force

Fourth quarter

- 12:39 Air Force – Jordan Waiwaiole 52 Yd Fumble Return (Erik Soderberg Kick) 35–16 Air Force
- 09:49 Army – Austin Barr 9 Yd Pass From Trent Steelman (Two-Point Conversion Failed) 35–22 Air Force
- 06:27 Air Force – Tim Jefferson 1 Yd Run (Erik Soderberg Kick) 42–22 Air Force

=== Kent State ===
	1	2	3	4	Total
Black Knights	14	14	7	10	45
Golden Flashes	0	7	14	7	28

Army became bowl-eligible for the first time in 14 years with a solid 45–28 victory over Kent State. Quarterback Trent Steelman and slotback Brian Cobbs each rushed for two touchdowns as the Black Knights would put up six total rushing scores on the day against the Golden Flashes. Tyshon Goode led the Flashes with seven catches for 155 yards and a touchdown. Although Kent outgained Army by 410 yards to 382 yards on offense they were hampered by four turnovers. Army amassed 233 yards on the ground against Kent State, which came in leading the nation in rushing defense at 69.4 yards allowed a game.

Scoring summary

First quarter

- 08:09 Army – Jared Hassin 12 Yd Run (Alex Carlton Kick) 7–0 Army
- 02:03 Army – Trent Steelman 2 Yd Run (Alex Carlton Kick) 14–0 Army

Second quarter

- 12:46 Kent St. – Eugene Jarvis 19 Yd Run (Freddy Cortez Kick) 14–7 Army
- 04:25 Army – Brian Cobbs 2 Yd Run (Alex Carlton Kick) 21–7 Army
- 02:00 Army – Trent Steelman 3 Yd Run (Alex Carlton Kick) 28–7 Army

Third quarter

- 11:43 Kent St. – Jacquise Terry 2 Yd Run (Freddy Cortez Kick) 28–14 Army
- 07:32 Army – Raymond Maples 5 Yd Run (Alex Carlton Kick) 35–14 Army
- 04:23 Kent St. – Justin Thompson 2 Yd Pass From Giorgio Morgan (Freddy Cortez Kick) 35–21 Army

Fourth quarter

- 13:07 Army – Brian Cobbs 3 Yd Run (Alex Carlton Kick) 42–21 Army
- 12:16 Kent St. – Tyshon Goode 72 Yd Pass From Giorgio Morgan (Freddy Cortez Kick) 42–28 Army
- 06:29 Army – Alex Carlton 49 Yd FG 45–28 Army

=== Notre Dame ===
Shamrock Series: Army Black Knights (6–4) vs. Notre Dame Fighting Irish (5–5)

Quarter	1	2	3	4	Total
Army	3	0	0	0	3
Notre Dame	0	17	10	0	27

at Yankee Stadium • Bronx, New York

- Date: November 20
- Game time: 7:00 p.m. EDT
- Game weather: Mostly cloudy • 48 °F (9 °C) • Wind N/NW 11 miles per hour (18 km/h; 9.6 kn)
- Game attendance: 54,251
- Referee: John McDaid
- TV announcers (NBC): Tom Hammond and Mike Mayock
- Automated ScoreBook

Game information

Army

- Trent Steelman
  2/7, 39 Yds, 2 INT
- Patrick Mealy
  6 Rush, 30 Yds
- Davyd Brooks
  1 Rec, 27 Yds

Notre Dame

- Tommy Rees
  13/20, 214 Yds, TD, INT
- Cierre Wood
  14 Rush, 88 Yds
- Tyler Eifert
  4 Rec, 78 Yds, TD

Notre Dame dominated Army 27–3 in the first ever football game played at the new Yankee Stadium. Army would jump out to a 3–0 lead on its first possession of the game but for the first time this season the Black Knights were held without an offensive touchdown. Irish freshman quarterback Tommy Rees led the offense with 214 yards passing and one touchdown pass in his second career start. Notre Dame kept the Army triple-option running game in check as the Black Knights rushed for a season-low 135 yards rushing as the Army offense went three-and-out on most possessions.

With some extra bleachers in left and right fields, the sellout attendance of 54,251 set a record for the largest crowd for a sporting event at the two-year-old ballpark.

Scoring summary

Quarter	Time	Drive			Team	Scoring information	Score	
Quarter	Time	Plays	Yards	TOP	Team	Scoring information	ARMY	ND
1	2:10	17	78	8:45	Army	20-yard field goal by Alex Carlton	3	0
2	14:50	6	36	2:15	Notre Dame	47-yard field goal by David Ruffer	3	3
2	11:55	4	40	0:50	Notre Dame	Robert Hughes 1-yard touchdown run, David Ruffer kick good	3	10
2	8:01	5	71	2:17	Notre Dame	Tyler Eifert 31-yard touchdown reception from Tommy Rees, David Ruffer kick good	3	17
3	14:00				Notre Dame	Interception returned 42 yards for touchdown by Darrin Walls, David Ruffer kick good	3	24
3	5:23	6	16	2:25	Notre Dame	39-yard field goal by David Ruffer	3	27
"TOP" = time of possession. For other American football terms, see Glossary of American football.							3	27

=== Navy ===
	1	2	3	4	Total
Midshipmen	10	14	0	7	31
Black Knights	0	7	3	7	17

Navy extended their winning streak over Army to nine straight with a 31–17 victory in Philadelphia. Ricky Dobbs paced the Midshipmen with 186 yards passing including 2 TD passes and 54 yards rushing. Two records would be broken in the storied rivalry as Dobbs would set the record for the longest touchdown pass in the series with a 77 yarder to John Howell in the first quarter. Wyatt Middleton of Navy would also set the record for the longest fumble return for a touchdown in the series with a 98-yard return in the second quarter.

The fumble recovery by Middleton would turn out to be the turning point in the contest. With Navy leading 17–7 Army had a first-and-goal at the Navy three-yard line when quarterback Trent Steelman tried to rush the ball in for a touchdown to pull the Black Knights to within 3 points just before the half. Steelman was stood up at the one-yard line and the ball was knocked loose right into Middleton's hands, he scampered untouched for the 98 yard score in what would amount to a 14-point swing-the eventual difference in the game.

Steelman paced the Army offense with 128 yards passing and two TD passes to Malcom Brown to go along with a team-high 74 yards rushing. Army would dominate the game from an offensive standpoint holding edges in, total yards, rushing yards, and time of possession. They would also hold a 4–2 edge on turnovers, but the fumble recovery and two big play TD passes by Dobbs would be too much to overcome.

Scoring summary

First quarter

- 11:57 Navy – Joe Buckley 36 Yd FG 3–0 Navy
- 08:44 Navy – John Howell 77 Yd Pass From Ricky Dobbs (Joe Buckley Kick) 10–0 Navy

Second quarter

- 13:44 Navy – Brandon Turner 32 Yd Pass From Ricky Dobbs (Joe Buckley Kick) 17–0 Navy
- 08:19 Army – Malcolm Brown 5 Yd Pass From Trent Steelman (Alex Carlton Kick) 17–7 Navy
- 01:03 Navy – Wyatt Middleton 98 Yd Fumble Return (Joe Buckley Kick) 24–7 Navy

Third quarter

- 08:08 Army – Alex Carlton 42 Yd FG 24–10 Navy

Fourth quarter

- 05:44 Navy – Gee Gee Greene 25 Yd Run (Joe Buckley Kick) 31–10 Navy
- 04:05 Army – Malcolm Brown 45 Yd Pass From Trent Steelman (Alex Carlton Kick) 31–17 Navy

=== SMU (Armed Forces Bowl) ===
	1	2	3	4	Total
Black Knights	13	3	0	0	16
Mustangs	0	0	7	7	14

Army picked up its first Bowl victory since 1985 and clinched its first winning season since 1996 with a 16–14 victory over SMU in the Bell Helicopter Armed Forces Bowl. Army's defense was the story in the first half as the Black Knights scored a defensive touchdown on a Josh McNary fumble recovery and also picked off SMU quarterback Kyle Padron twice. The Mustangs fought back though and Padron threw two second half touchdowns to bring the contest down to one score. SMU missed a 47-yard field goal attempt to take the lead with just a few minutes remaining in the contest, and Army was able to pick up two key first downs to close out the game.

Jared Hassin led the Black Knights offense with 82 yards rushing, which pushed him just over the 1,000 yard mark for the season. Army quarterback Trent Steelman was just 2 of 7 passing for 30 yards and also only rushed for 27 yards. However, despite the Black Knights ranking last in the nation in passing yards per game, it was a 22-yard pass play from Steelman to Davyd Brooks that sealed the victory. SMU's offense was paced by Padron who threw for 302 yards to go along with his two TD throws. Tailback Zach Line rushed 17 times for 103 yards, while Darius Johnson led all receivers with 9 grabs for 152 yards and a touchdown.

Army senior linebacker Stephen Anderson was named the Army player of the game after contributing 14 tackles, an interception and a sack.

Scoring summary

First quarter

- 13:33 Army – Josh McNary 55 Yd Fumble Return (Alex Carlton Kick) 7–0 Army
- 05:26 Army – Malcolm Brown 13 Yd Run (PAT Failed) 13–0 Army

Second quarter

- 02:39 Army – Alex Carlton 44 Yd FG 16–0 Army

Third quarter

- 02:56 SMU – Aldrick Robinson 8 Yd Pass From Kyle Padron (Matt Szymanski Kick) 16–7 Army

Fourth quarter

- 09:20 SMU – Darius Johnson 28 Yd Pass From Kyle Padron (Matt Szymanski Kick) 16–14 Army

== Roster ==
- LB Josh McNary, Sr.
