= 2010 Kent State Golden Flashes football team =

American college football season

2010 Kent State Golden Flashes football
- Conference: Mid-American Conference
- East
- Record: 5–7 (4–4 MAC)
- Head coach: Doug Martin (7th season)
- Offensive scheme: Air raid
- Defensive coordinator: Pete Rekstis (7th season)
- Base defense: 4–3
- Home stadium: Dix Stadium

2010 Mid-American Conference football standings
	Conf.			Overall
Team	W		L	W		L
East Division
Miami (OH) x$	7	–	1	10	–	4
Ohio	6	–	2	8	–	5
Temple	5	–	3	8	–	4
Kent State	4	–	4	5	–	7
Bowling Green	1	–	7	2	–	10
Buffalo	1	–	7	2	–	10
Akron	1	–	7	1	–	11
West Division
Northern Illinois x	8	–	0	11	–	3
Toledo	7	–	1	8	–	5
Western Michigan	5	–	3	6	–	6
Ball State	3	–	5	4	–	8
Central Michigan	2	–	6	3	–	9
Eastern Michigan	2	–	6	2	–	10
Championship: Miami 26, Northern Illinois 21
$ – Conference champion; x – Division champion/co-champions

The 2010 Kent State Golden Flashes football team represented Kent State University during the 2010 NCAA Division I FBS football season. The Golden Flashes, led by seventh-year head coach Doug Martin, compete in the East Division of the Mid-American Conference and played their home games at Dix Stadium. They finished the season 5–7, 4–4 in MAC play. Head coach Doug Martin resigned on November 21 effective at the end of the season.

== Schedule ==
Date	Time	Opponent	Site	TV	Result	Attendance
September 2	7:00 pm	Murray State*	Dix Stadium; Kent, OH		W 41–10	16,535
September 11	3:30 pm	at Boston College*	Alumni Stadium; Chestnut Hill, MA	ESPNU	L 13–26	35,122
September 18	12:00 pm	at No. 20 Penn State*	Beaver Stadium; University Park, PA	ESPN2	L 0–24	100,610
October 2	1:00 pm	at Miami (OH)	Yager Stadium; Oxford, OH		L 21–27	17,666
October 9	3:30 pm	Akron^{†}	Dix Stadium; Kent, OH (Wagon Wheel)		W 28–17	24,221
October 16	7:00 pm	at Toledo	Glass Bowl; Toledo, OH		L 21–34	20,048
October 23	3:30 pm	at Bowling Green	Doyt Perry Stadium; Bowling Green, OH (Anniversary Award)		W 30–6	14,279
October 30	2:00 pm	Ball State	Dix Stadium; Kent, OH		W 33–14	15,468
November 6	2:00 pm	Temple	Dix Stadium; Kent, OH		L 10–28	15,125
November 13	2:00 pm	Army*	Dix Stadium; Kent, OH		L 28–45	17,222
November 20	2:00 pm	at Western Michigan	Waldo Stadium; Kalamazoo, MI		L 3–38	8,763
November 26	11:00 am	Ohio	Dix Stadium; Kent, OH	ESPNU	W 28–6	8,340
*Non-conference game; ^{†}Homecoming; Rankings from Coaches' Poll released prior to the game; All times are in Eastern time
