= 2010 Central Michigan Chippewas football team =

American college football season

2010 Central Michigan Chippewas football
- Conference: Mid-American Conference
- West Division
- Record: 3–9 (2–6 MAC)
- Head coach: Dan Enos (1st season)
- Offensive coordinator: Mike Cummings (1st season)
- Defensive coordinator: Joe Tumpkin (1st season)
- Home stadium: Kelly/Shorts Stadium

2010 Mid-American Conference football standings
	Conf.			Overall
Team	W		L	W		L
East Division
Miami (OH) x$	7	–	1	10	–	4
Ohio	6	–	2	8	–	5
Temple	5	–	3	8	–	4
Kent State	4	–	4	5	–	7
Bowling Green	1	–	7	2	–	10
Buffalo	1	–	7	2	–	10
Akron	1	–	7	1	–	11
West Division
Northern Illinois x	8	–	0	11	–	3
Toledo	7	–	1	8	–	5
Western Michigan	5	–	3	6	–	6
Ball State	3	–	5	4	–	8
Central Michigan	2	–	6	3	–	9
Eastern Michigan	2	–	6	2	–	10
Championship: Miami 26, Northern Illinois 21
$ – Conference champion; x – Division champion/co-champions

The 2010 Central Michigan Chippewas football team represented Central Michigan University during the 2010 NCAA Division I FBS football season. The Chippewas, led by first-year head coach Dan Enos, compete in the West Division of the Mid-American Conference and played their home games at Kelly/Shorts Stadium. They finished the season 3–9, 2–6 in MAC play.

== Schedule ==
Date	Time	Opponent	Site	TV	Result	Attendance	Source
September 2	7:00 pm	Hampton*	Kelly/Shorts Stadium; Mount Pleasant, MI		W 33–0	17,311	
September 9	7:00 pm	at Temple	Lincoln Financial Field; Philadelphia, PA	ESPNU	L 10–13 ^{OT}	15,152	
September 18	4:00 pm	at Eastern Michigan	Rynearson Stadium; Ypsilanti, MI (rivalry)		W 52–14	20,348	
September 25	12:00 pm	at Northwestern*	Ryan Field; Evanston, IL	BTN	L 25–30	30,075	
October 2	3:30 pm	Ball State	Kelly/Shorts Stadium; Mount Pleasant, MI		L 17–31	20,152	
October 9	1:30 pm	at Virginia Tech*	Lane Stadium; Blacksburg, VA	ESPNU	L 21–45	66,233	
October 16	12:00 pm	Miami (OH)^{†}	Kelly/Shorts Stadium; Mount Pleasant, MI	ESPN+	L 20–27	24,761	
October 23	4:00 pm	at Northern Illinois	Huskie Stadium; DeKalb, IL	CSNC	L 7–33	17,042	
October 30	3:30 pm	Bowling Green	Kelly/Shorts Stadium; Mount Pleasant, MI		L 14–17	17,659	
November 5	6:00 pm	Western Michigan	Kelly/Shorts Stadium; Mount Pleasant, MI (rivalry)	ESPNU	W 26–22	22,355	
November 13	3:30 pm	at Navy*	Navy–Marine Corps Memorial Stadium; Annapolis, MD	CBSCS	L 37–38	34,333	
November 26	2:00 pm	at Toledo	Glass Bowl; Toledo, OH	ESPN3	L 31–42	12,121	
*Non-conference game; ^{†}Homecoming; All times are in Eastern time

== Game summaries ==
=== Vs. Hampton ===
Hampton at Central Michigan

Team	1	2	3	4	Total
Pirates	0	0	0	0	0
• Chippewas	16	7	3	7	33

- Date: September 2
- Location: Kelly/Shorts Stadium
- Game start: 7:00 p.m. EDT
- Game attendance: 17,311

=== At Temple ===
Central Michigan at Temple

Team	1	2	3	4	OT	Total
Chippewas	0	0	7	3	0	10
• Owls	0	7	3	0	3	13

- Date: September 9
- Location: Lincoln Financial Field
- Game start: 7:00 p.m. EDT
- Game attendance: 15,152
- Television network: ESPNU

=== At Eastern Michigan ===
Central Michigan at Eastern Michigan

Team	1	2	3	4	Total
• Chippewas	14	7	14	17	52
Eagles	0	7	7	0	14

- Date: September 18
- Location: Rynearson Stadium
- Game start: 4:00 p.m. EDT
- Game attendance: 20,348

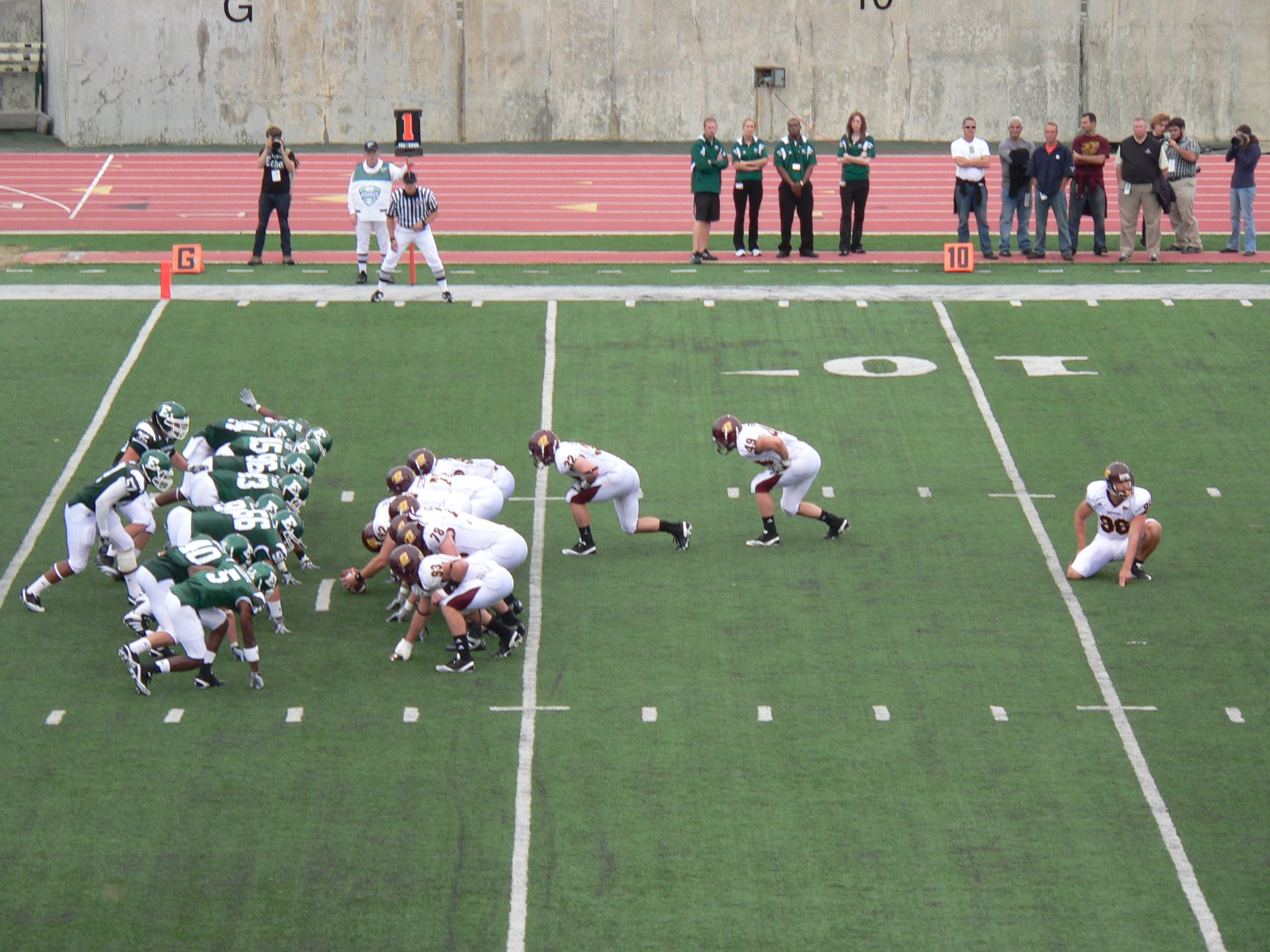
Central Michigan lined up for one of their seven converts against EMU.

Scoring summary

1st Quarter

- 4:13 CMU – Cody Wilson 21-yard pass from Ryan Radcliff (David Harman kick) 7-0 CMU
- 0:47 CMU – Paris Cotton 13-yard run (David Harman kick) 14-0 CMU

2nd Quarter

- 4:28 EMU – Dwayne Priest 2-yard run (Sean Graham kick) 14-7 CMU
- 1:45 CMU – Paris Cotton 1-yard run (David Harman kick) 21-7 CMU

3rd Quarter

- 13:30 CMU – Paris Cotton 61-yard run (David Harman kick) 28-7 CMU
- 8:09 EMU – Donald Scott 52-yard pass from Alex Gillett (Sean Graham kick) 28-14 CMU
- 4:20 CMU – Kito Poblah 14-yard pass from Ryan Radcliff (David Harman kick) 35-14 CMU

4th Quarter

- 13:42 CMU – Mike Petrucci 43-yard fumble return (David Harman kick) 42-14 CMU
- 8:09 CMU – David Harman 41-yard field goal 45-14 CMU
- 6:25 CMU – Zurlon Tipton 20-yard run (David Harman kick) 52-14 CMU
