= 2010 Northern Illinois Huskies football team =

American college football season

2010 Northern Illinois Huskies football

MAC West Division champion Humanitarian Bowl champion

MAC Championship, L 21–26 vs. Miami (OH)

Humanitarian Bowl, W 40–17 vs. Fresno State
- Conference: Mid-American Conference
- West Division
- Record: 11–3 (8–0 MAC)
- Head coach: Jerry Kill (3rd season; first 13 games); Tom Matukewicz (interim, bowl game)
- Offensive coordinator: Matt Limegrover (3rd season)
- Defensive coordinator: Tracy Claeys (3rd season)
- MVP: Chandler Harnish
- Captains: Jake Coffman; Landon Cox; Ricky Crider; Chandler Harnish; Alex Kube; Trevor Olson; Jason Schepler; Tracy Wilson
- Home stadium: Huskie Stadium

2010 Mid-American Conference football standings
	Conf.			Overall
Team	W		L	W		L
East Division
Miami (OH) x$	7	–	1	10	–	4
Ohio	6	–	2	8	–	5
Temple	5	–	3	8	–	4
Kent State	4	–	4	5	–	7
Bowling Green	1	–	7	2	–	10
Buffalo	1	–	7	2	–	10
Akron	1	–	7	1	–	11
West Division
Northern Illinois x	8	–	0	11	–	3
Toledo	7	–	1	8	–	5
Western Michigan	5	–	3	6	–	6
Ball State	3	–	5	4	–	8
Central Michigan	2	–	6	3	–	9
Eastern Michigan	2	–	6	2	–	10
Championship: Miami 26, Northern Illinois 21
$ – Conference champion; x – Division champion/co-champions

The 2010 Northern Illinois Huskies football team represented Northern Illinois University as a member of the West Division of the Mid-American Conference (MAC) during the 2010 NCAA Division I FBS football season. The Huskies compiled an overall record of 11–3 with a mark of 8–0 in conference play, winning the MAC's West Division title. The team advanced to the MAC Championship, where they lost the Miami RedHawks. Northern Illinois was invited to the Humanitarian Bowl, where they defeated Fresno State. The Huskies were led by third-year head coach Jerry Kill during the regular season and for the MAC title game before KIll resigned to become the head football coach at the University of Minnesota. Tom Matukewicz was appointed interim head coach for the bowl game. The team played home games at Huskie Stadium in DeKalb, Illinois.

The season was the third consecutive in which Northern Illinois played in a bowl game. The team's victory in the Humanitarian Bowl was first bowl game win for the Huskies since the 2004 Silicon Valley Football Classic.

== Preseason ==
NIU was considered the favorite in the Pre-season Poll to win the West Division for the MAC.

=== Recruiting ===
College recruiting information (2010)
Name	Hometown	School	Height	Weight	40^{‡}	Commit date
Tyler Anderson; K	Rockford, IL	Guilford H.S.	5 ft 11 in (1.80 m)	186 lb (84 kg)	-	Feb 3, 2010
Tyler Anderson; K	Recruit ratings: Scout: Rivals: (72)					
Greg Barksdale; LB/S	University Park, IL	Crete-Monee H.S	6 ft 2 in (1.88 m)	210 lb (95 kg)	4.6	Feb 3, 2010
Greg Barksdale; LB/S	Recruit ratings: Scout: Rivals: (76)					
Jamaal Bass; LB	Miramar, FL	Miramar H.S	5 ft 11 in (1.80 m)	189 lb (86 kg)	4.5	Feb 3, 2010
Jamaal Bass; LB	Recruit ratings: Scout: Rivals: (73)					
Matt Battaglia; OT	Chicago, IL	Harper JC	6 ft 4 in (1.93 m)	270 lb (120 kg)	-	Feb 3, 2010
Matt Battaglia; OT	Recruit ratings: Scout: Rivals: (N/A)					
Frank Boenzi; DT	Geneva, IL	Geneva H.S	6 ft 3 in (1.91 m)	290 lb (130 kg)	-	Dec 7, 2009
Frank Boenzi; DT	Recruit ratings: Scout: Rivals: (72)					
Da'Ron Brown; WR	Chicago, IL	Morgan Park H.S	6 ft 1 in (1.85 m)	180 lb (82 kg)	4.7	Jan 13, 2010
Da'Ron Brown; WR	Recruit ratings: Scout: Rivals: (40)					
C.J. Compher; TE	Sycamore, IL	Sycamore H.S	6 ft 1 in (1.85 m)	230 lb (100 kg)	-	Feb 3, 2010
C.J. Compher; TE	Recruit ratings: Scout: Rivals: (40)					
Akeem Daniels; CB	Kissimmee, FL	Osceola H.S	5 ft 7 in (1.70 m)	170 lb (77 kg)	-	Feb 3, 2010
Akeem Daniels; CB	Recruit ratings: Scout: Rivals: (40)					
Dechane Durante; LB / S	Charlotte, NC	Vance High School	6 ft 3 in (1.91 m)	191 lb (87 kg)	4.5	Feb 1, 2010
Dechane Durante; LB / S	Recruit ratings: Scout: Rivals: (40)					
Luke Eakes; TE	Kinsley, KS	St. Mary's H.S	6 ft 4 in (1.93 m)	230 lb (100 kg)	-	Feb 3, 2010
Luke Eakes; TE	Recruit ratings: Scout: Rivals: (40)					
Michael Gegner; C	Indianapolis, IN	Warren Central	6 ft 3 in (1.91 m)	265 lb (120 kg)	-	Dec 16, 2009
Michael Gegner; C	Recruit ratings: Scout: Rivals: (40)					
Zak Giller; S	Unadilla Township, Michigan	Chelsea H.S	6 ft 2 in (1.88 m)	195 lb (88 kg)	-	Feb 3, 2010
Zak Giller; S	Recruit ratings: Scout: Rivals: (40)					
Blake Goodell; G/DT	Traverse City, MI	Traverse City West	6 ft 3 in (1.91 m)	270 lb (120 kg)	-	Dec 15, 2009
Blake Goodell; G/DT	Recruit ratings: Scout: Rivals: (40)					
Marckie Hayes; S	Sycamore, IL	Sycamore H.S	5 ft 8 in (1.73 m)	180 lb (82 kg)	-	Feb 3, 2010
Marckie Hayes; S	Recruit ratings: Scout: Rivals: (40)					
Mike Hellams; LB	Bolingbrook, IL	Bolingbrook H.S	6 ft 1 in (1.85 m)	220 lb (100 kg)	-	Jun 15, 2009
Mike Hellams; LB	Recruit ratings: Scout: Rivals: (40)					
Jasmin Hopkins; RB	Fort Scott, KS	Fort Scott C.C	5 ft 7 in (1.70 m)	185 lb (84 kg)	-	Jan 31, 2010
Jasmin Hopkins; RB	Recruit ratings: Scout: Rivals: (N/A)					
Tyler Loos; OT	Sterling, IL	Sterling H.S	6 ft 5 in (1.96 m)	270 lb (120 kg)	5.4	Jan 11, 2010
Tyler Loos; OT	Recruit ratings: Scout: Rivals: (73)					
Tyler Pitt; OT	McRae, GA	Telfair County	6 ft 6 in (1.98 m)	278 lb (126 kg)	-	Feb 3, 2010
Tyler Pitt; OT	Recruit ratings: Scout: Rivals: (40)					
Michael Santacaterina; S	Geneva, IL	Geneva H.S	6 ft 0 in (1.83 m)	210 lb (95 kg)	-	Feb 3, 2010
Michael Santacaterina; S	Recruit ratings: Scout: Rivals: (40)					
Mat Sims; K	Hannibal, MO	Hannibal H.S	5 ft 11 in (1.80 m)	180 lb (82 kg)	-	Feb 3, 2010
Mat Sims; K	Recruit ratings: Scout: Rivals: (73)					
Cameron Stingily; LB	Romeoville, IL	Romeoville H.S	6 ft 2 in (1.88 m)	230 lb (100 kg)	-	Dec 11, 2009
Cameron Stingily; LB	Recruit ratings: Scout: Rivals: (71)					
Demetrius Stone; S	Coffeyville, KS	Coffeyville CC	5 ft 11 in (1.80 m)	190 lb (86 kg)	4.7	Feb 3, 2010
Demetrius Stone; S	Recruit ratings: Scout: Rivals: (N/A)					
Casey Weston; QB	Senatobia, MS	Northwest Mississippi CC	6 ft 2 in (1.88 m)	215 lb (98 kg)	-	Feb 3, 2010
Casey Weston; QB	Recruit ratings: Scout: Rivals: (N/A)					
Joe Windsor; DE	Kearney, MO	Kearney H.S	6 ft 1 in (1.85 m)	225 lb (102 kg)	-	Feb 3, 2010
Joe Windsor; DE	Recruit ratings: Scout: Rivals: (70)					
Overall recruit ranking: Scout: 103 Rivals: 4/13 in MAC
Note: In many cases, Scout, Rivals, 247Sports, On3, and ESPN may conflict in their listings of height and weight.; In these cases, the average was taken. ESPN grades are on a 100-point scale.; Sources: "2010 NIU Commits". Rivals.; "2010 NIU Commits". Scout.; "ESPN". ESPN.; "Scout.com Team Recruiting Rankings". Scout.; "2010 Team Ranking". Rivals.com.

- Recruited Jasmin Hopkins from Fort Scott Community College where he rushed for 1,931 yards on 300 carries and recorded 18 touchdowns in his Sophomore campaign.

=== Notable returning players ===
- #28 (Sr.) Running back Chad Spann First-team all MAC in 2009 (T-5 in NCAA with 19 touchdowns in 2009)
- #54 (Sr.) Defensive end Jake Coffman Second-team all MAC in 2009
- #20 (So.) Defensive back Tommy Davis Third-team all MAC in 2009 as a return specialist

== Schedule ==
Date	Time	Opponent	Rank	Site	TV	Result	Attendance	Source
September 2	7:00 p.m.	at Iowa State*		Jack Trice Stadium; Ames, IA	CSNC	L 10–27	43,116	
September 11	6:00 p.m.	North Dakota*		Huskie Stadium; DeKalb, IL		W 23–17	18,046	
September 18	11:00 a.m.	at Illinois*		Memorial Stadium; Champaign, IL	BTN	L 22–28	50,569	
September 25	7:30 p.m.	at Minnesota*		TCF Bank Stadium; Minneapolis, MN	BTN	W 34–23	49,368	
October 2	5:00 p.m.	at Akron		InfoCision Stadium; Akron, OH		W 50–14	12,133	
October 9	11:00 a.m.	Temple		Huskie Stadium; DeKalb, IL	ESPN Plus	W 31–17	14,011	
October 16	2:30 p.m.	Buffalo^{†}		Huskie Stadium; DeKalb, IL		W 45–14	21,230	
October 23	3:05 p.m.	Central Michigan		Huskie Stadium; DeKalb, IL	CSNC/ESPN3	W 33–7	17,042	
October 30	11:00 a.m.	at Western Michigan		Waldo Stadium; Kalamazoo, MI	ESPN+	W 28–21	12,578	
November 9	6:00 p.m.	Toledo		Huskie Stadium; DeKalb, IL	ESPN2	W 65–30	18,472	
November 20	12:00 p.m.	at Ball State		Scheumann Stadium; Muncie, IN (Bronze Stalk Trophy)		W 59–21	5,524	
November 26	11:00 a.m.	at Eastern Michigan		Rynearson Stadium; Ypsilanti, MI		W 71–3	5,147	
December 3	7:00 p.m.	vs. Miami (OH)	No. 24	Ford Field; Detroit, MI (MAC Championship Game)	ESPN2	L 21–26	12,031	
December 18	4:30 p.m.	vs. Fresno State*		Bronco Stadium; Boise, ID (Humanitarian Bowl)	ESPN	W 40–17	25,449	
*Non-conference game; ^{†}Homecoming; Rankings from AP Poll released prior to the game; All times are in Central time

== Rankings ==
Ranking movements Legend: ██ Increase in ranking ██ Decrease in ranking — = Not ranked RV = Received votes
	Week															
Poll	Pre	1	2	3	4	5	6	7	8	9	10	11	12	13	14	Final
AP	—	—	—	—	—	—	—	—	RV	RV	RV	RV	RV	24	RV	RV
Coaches	RV	—	—	—	—	—	—	—	RV	RV	RV	RV	RV	23	RV	RV
Harris	Not released							—	—	—	RV	RV	RV	24	RV	Not released
BCS	Not released							—	—	—	—	—	—	25	—	Not released

== Game summaries ==
=== Iowa State ===
	1	2	3	4	Total
Huskies	0	0	3	7	10
Cyclones	7	10	0	10	27

Despite being without the services of starting quarterback Chandler Harnish, the Huskies pulled within a touchdown midway through the fourth quarter on a one-yard touchdown run by backup signal caller DeMarcus Grady. But an Iowa State touchdown drive immediately thereafter put the game away for the Cyclones.

=== North Dakota ===
	1	2	3	4	Total
Fighting Sioux	0	7	7	3	17
Huskies	13	3	0	7	23

Hours after the 23–17 win against North Dakota, head coach Jerry Kill was hospitalized for dehydration. He was released and returned to coach the Huskies against Illinois the following week.

=== Illinois ===
	1	2	3	4	Total
Huskies	12	0	0	10	22
Fighting Illini	7	11	0	10	28

The Huskie defense was scorched on the ground, allowing 319 rushing yards to the Fighting Illini, and NIU star tailback Chad Spann was held to only 15 yards on 13 carries. Harnish had a strong performance, but lost a fumble in Illinois territory in the fourth quarter that proved to be costly. Punter Josh Wilber was named the MAC West Division Special Teams Player of the Week. He averaged 49.0 yards on five punts, with three punts over 50 yards.

=== Minnesota ===
	1	2	3	4	Total
Huskies	7	13	0	14	34
Golden Gophers	3	10	3	7	23

The win was the third over a Big Ten school in the history of the program, and the second in as many years. Spann was named MAC West Division Offensive Player of the Week and Walter Camp Football Foundation Player of the Week. He rushed for 223 yards and two touchdowns on 15 carries.

=== Akron ===
	1	2	3	4	Total
Huskies	6	23	14	7	50
Zips	7	0	7	0	14

Harnish was named MAC West Division Offensive Player of the Week. He completed 16 of 20 passes for 281 yards and three touchdowns in three quarters of action while leading the Huskies to a 50–14 victory at Akron.

=== Temple ===
	1	2	3	4	Total
Owls	7	10	0	0	17
Huskies	7	10	7	7	31

In a matchup of preseason MAC favorites, the Huskies took over in the second half thanks in large part to a dominant and balanced offensive performance that wore the Owls down on a warm day in DeKalb.

Harnish was named MAC West Division Offensive Player of the Week. Harnish accounted for 282 yards of total offense with 211 yards passing and 71 rushing in NIU's 31–17 victory over Temple.

=== Buffalo ===
	1	2	3	4	Total
Bulls	0	14	0	0	14
Huskies	0	21	10	14	45

Safety Jimmie Ward was named MAC West Division Special Teams Player of the Week. The freshman from Mobile, Alabama recorded his second blocked punt of the season in a 45–14 win over Buffalo.

=== Central Michigan ===
	1	2	3	4	Total
Chippewas	0	7	0	0	7
Huskies	3	6	14	10	33

Northern Illinois continued its second-half dominance against MAC foes, not allowing a point after halftime for the third straight week. Linebacker Tyrone Clark was named Mid-American Conference West Division Defensive Player of the Week. Clark picked off two passes in the Huskies' 33–7 win over Central Michigan. His two interceptions both came in the second quarter off of tipped balls.

=== Western Michigan ===
	1	2	3	4	Total
Huskies	0	13	7	8	28
Broncos	7	7	0	7	21

Harnish found Willie Clark with a 21-yard TD pass with 3:42 to play to lift the Huskies to their six straight victory, their longest winning streak since 2004. Defensive end Jake Coffman was named MAC West Division Defensive Player of the Week. Coffman came down with a win-clinching interception during the Huskies' 28–21 victory at Western Michigan. Coffman also had four tackles, 1.5 tackles for loss and half a sack.

=== Toledo ===
	1	2	3	4	Total
Rockets	0	0	23	7	30
Huskies	7	21	28	9	65

Toledo could not hold on against Northern Illinois's offense as the Huskies dominated the Rockets with Spann scoring three touchdowns and Harnish going 11-of-16 for 162 yards. Harnish was named MAC West Division Offensive Player of the Week for the third time this season. He went 11-of-16 for 162 yards and rushed for 149 yards as well as scoring a touchdown on a 28-yard run.

=== Ball State ===
	1	2	3	4	Total
Huskies	14	21	10	14	59
Cardinals	0	7	14	0	21

While winning their eighth straight game and clinching the MAC West Division title, the Huskies excelled on offense, defense, and special teams in a 59–21 victory. Llinebacker Jordan Delegal was named MAC West Division Special Teams Player of the Week. He blocked two punts as the Huskies set a school record with three blocked punts in the game.

=== Eastern Michigan ===
	1	2	3	4	Total
Huskies	20	17	21	13	71
Eagles	0	3	0	0	3

The Huskies had 654 yards on 46 plays, rushing for 552 yards, with most of the starters on the sideline for the second half. The Huskies swept MAC play for the first time in school history and will play Miami (8-4, 7-1) in the MAC Championship. The 71 points was the fifth most scored by the Huskies in program history. Coffman was named MAC West Division Defensive Player of the Week. He finished with five solo tackles, one sack, two tackles for loss and a forced fumble.

=== MAC Championship: Miami (OH) ===
	1	2	3	4	Total
RedHawks	13	0	7	6	26
#25 Huskies	14	0	0	7	21

Armand Robinson caught a 33-yard touchdown pass from Austin Boucher with 33 seconds remaining, lifting Miami to a stunning 26–21 upset of No. 25 NIU in the MAC Championship Game at Ford Field. The win marked the second time the RedHawks had won the league title game and completed a worst-to-first league finish.

=== Humanitarian Bowl: Fresno State ===
	1	2	3	4	Total
Bulldogs	7	3	0	7	17
Huskies	6	17	10	7	40

== Scores by quarter ==
	1	2	3	4	Total
NIU	103	148	114	127	492
Opponents	51	86	61	50	248

== Postseason awards ==
=== Award watch lists ===
Award	Player	Year
Doak Walker Award (Outstanding Running Back)	Chad Spann	Sr.
Lowe's Senior CLASS Award (Outstanding Senior NCAA Division I Student-Athlete)	Jake Coffman	Sr.

=== All-MAC ===
Team	Player	Position	Year
1st	Chandler Harnish	QB	JR.
1st	Scott Wedige	C	JR.
1st	Trevor Olson	OT	JR.
1st	Chad Spann	TB	SR.
1st	Sean Progar	DE	SO.
1st	Chris Smith	CB	SR.
2nd	Joe Pawlak	OL	JR.
2nd	Jake Coffman	DE	SR.
3rd	Jason Schepler	TE	JR.
3rd	Landon Cox	WR	SR.
3rd	Alex Kube	LB	SR.
3rd	Devon Butler	LB	SO.
3rd	Tommy Davis	KR	SO.
