= 2010 Temple Owls football team =

American college football season

2010 Temple Owls football
- Conference: Mid-American Conference
- East
- Record: 8–4 (5–3 MAC)
- Head coach: Al Golden (5th season)
- Offensive coordinator: Matt Rhule (3rd season)
- Offensive scheme: Pro spread
- Defensive coordinator: Mark D'Onofrio (5th season)
- Base defense: 4–3
- Home stadium: Lincoln Financial Field

2010 Mid-American Conference football standings
	Conf.			Overall
Team	W		L	W		L
East Division
Miami (OH) x$	7	–	1	10	–	4
Ohio	6	–	2	8	–	5
Temple	5	–	3	8	–	4
Kent State	4	–	4	5	–	7
Bowling Green	1	–	7	2	–	10
Buffalo	1	–	7	2	–	10
Akron	1	–	7	1	–	11
West Division
Northern Illinois x	8	–	0	11	–	3
Toledo	7	–	1	8	–	5
Western Michigan	5	–	3	6	–	6
Ball State	3	–	5	4	–	8
Central Michigan	2	–	6	3	–	9
Eastern Michigan	2	–	6	2	–	10
Championship: Miami 26, Northern Illinois 21
$ – Conference champion; x – Division champion/co-champions

The 2010 Temple Owls football team represented Temple University during the 2010 NCAA Division I FBS football season. The Owls, led by fourth-year head coach Al Golden, compete in the East Division of the Mid-American Conference and played their home games at Lincoln Financial Field. They finished the season 8–4, 5–3 in MAC play and were the only team with more than 6 wins to not be invited to a bowl game.

== Schedule ==
Date	Time	Opponent	Site	TV	Result	Attendance	Source
September 3	5:00 p.m.	No. 1 (FCS) Villanova*	Lincoln Financial Field; Philadelphia, PA (Mayor's Cup)	ESPN3	W 31–24	32,193	
September 9	7:00 p.m.	Central Michigan	Lincoln Financial Field; Philadelphia, PA	ESPNU	W 13–10 ^{OT}	15,152	
September 18	12:00 p.m.	Connecticut*	Lincoln Financial Field; Philadelphia, PA	ESPN Plus	W 30–16	18,702	
September 25	3:30 p.m.	at No. 23 Penn State*	Beaver Stadium; State College, PA	BTN	L 13–22	104,840	
October 2	12:00 p.m.	at Army*	Michie Stadium; West Point, NY	CBSCS	W 42–35	33,065	
October 9	12:00 p.m.	at Northern Illinois	Huskie Stadium; DeKalb, IL	ESPN Plus	L 17–31	14,011	
October 16	1:00 p.m.	Bowling Green^{†}	Lincoln Financial Field; Philadelphia, PA		W 28–27	23,045	
October 23	12:00 p.m.	at Buffalo	University at Buffalo Stadium; Buffalo, NY	ESPN Plus	W 42–0	13,371	
October 30	1:00 p.m.	Akron	Lincoln Financial Field; Philadelphia, PA		W 30–0	17,563	
November 6	2:00 p.m.	at Kent State	Dix Stadium; Kent, OH		W 28–10	15,125	
November 16	8:00 p.m.	Ohio	Lincoln Financial Field; Philadelphia, PA	ESPN2	L 23–31	16,433	
November 23	7:00 p.m.	at Miami (OH)	Yager Stadium; Oxford, OH	ESPN2	L 3–23	13,235	
*Non-conference game; ^{†}Homecoming; Rankings from AP Poll released prior to the game; All times are in Eastern time

== Game summaries ==
=== Vs. Villanova ===
Villanova at Temple

Team	1	2	3	4	Total
Wildcats	0	14	0	10	24
• Owls	7	3	3	18	31

- Date: September 3
- Location: Lincoln Financial Field
- Game start: 5:00 p.m. EDT
- Game attendance: 32,193
- Television network: ESPN3

Getting revenge for last year in which Temple blew a 10-point lead to lose to Villanova 27–24, the Wildcats this time seemed to have Temple on the ropes. Villanova did not punt until the fourth quarter, but Temple's victory, aided by missed field goals and interceptions, was sealed very late in the game. Temple took an early 7–0 lead, then Villanova made it 14–7 after two quick touchdown passes, but Temple made it 14–10 by halftime. The only scoring of the third quarter saw Temple close the gap to one point, but Villanova retook the lead with a touchdown, which was soon answered by a Temple field goal, then Temple took the lead with a touchdown strike to make it 22–21, missing the two-point conversion. Villanova retook the lead late in the fourth to go up 24–22 with a field goal, but Temple answered with one of their own to retake the lead 25–24 with one second left. Then, in a wild finish, Villanova's attempt to win the game ended with Temple running a fumble back for the final points to set the score at 31–24 which belied the wild play seen late in the fourth.

=== Vs. Central Michigan ===
Central Michigan at Temple

Team	1	2	3	4	OT	Total
Chippewas	0	0	7	3	0	10
• Owls	0	7	3	0	3	13

- Date: September 9
- Location: Lincoln Financial Field
- Game start: 7:00 p.m. EDT
- Game attendance: 15,152
- Television network: ESPNU

Upsetting reigning MAC champion Central Michigan, who finished ranked last year, the Owls were in control for three and a half quarters until a late field goal made it a tied ballgame, but Temple retook control in overtime to set themselves at their first 2–0 start in years.

== NFL draft ==
1st Round, 30th Overall Pick by the New York Jets—Jr. DE Muhammad Wilkerson

2nd Round, 54th Overall Pick by the Philadelphia Eagles—Sr. S Jaiquawn Jarrett
