= 2010 MAC Championship Game =

- Conference Championship
Northern Illinois Huskies	Miami RedHawks
(10–2)	(8–4)
21	26
Head coach: Jerry Kill	Head coach: Michael Haywood
AP / Coaches / BCS; 24 / 23 / 25
	1	2	3	4	Total
Northern Illinois	14	0	0	7	21
Miami	13	0	7	6	26
- Date: December 3, 2010
- Season: 2010
- Stadium: Ford Field
- Location: Detroit, Michigan
- MVP: Thomas Merriweather (RB, Miami)
- Favorite: N. Illinois by 18.5
- Referee: Mike Conlin (R), Ken Zelmanski (U), Bruce Keeling (L), J. Shelton (LJ), Tom Riepenhoff (BJ), Joel Clay (FJ)
- Attendance: 12,031

United States TV coverage
- Network: ESPN

2010 Mid-American Conference football standings
	Conf.			Overall
Team	W		L	W		L
East Division
Miami (OH) x$	7	–	1	10	–	4
Ohio	6	–	2	8	–	5
Temple	5	–	3	8	–	4
Kent State	4	–	4	5	–	7
Bowling Green	1	–	7	2	–	10
Buffalo	1	–	7	2	–	10
Akron	1	–	7	1	–	11
West Division
Northern Illinois x	8	–	0	11	–	3
Toledo	7	–	1	8	–	5
Western Michigan	5	–	3	6	–	6
Ball State	3	–	5	4	–	8
Central Michigan	2	–	6	3	–	9
Eastern Michigan	2	–	6	2	–	10
Championship: Miami 26, Northern Illinois 21
$ – Conference champion; x – Division champion/co-champions

The 2010 MAC Championship Game was played at 7:00 p.m. on Friday, December 3, 2010, at Ford Field in Detroit, Michigan to determine the 2010 football champion of the Mid-American Conference (MAC). The game featured the Miami University Redhawks and the Northern Illinois Huskies.

Miami defeated Northern Illinois 26-21 on a 33-yard pass from Austin Boucher to Armand Robinson for a touchdown with 33 seconds remaining in regulation. The game lasted 3 hours and 12 minutes.

== Scoring ==
First Quarter

- Miami — Thomas Merriweather scored on a 1-yard run to give MU-Ohio 6 point lead (Northern Illinois 0 - Miami 6)
- Northern Illinois — Martel Moore caught a 69-yard pass from Chand Harnish (Northern Illinois 7 - Miami 6)
- Miami — Tracy Woods ran for 7 yards for a touchdown (Northern Illinois 7 - Miami 13)
- Northern Illinois — Chand Harnish passed to Martel Moore for a 27-yard touchdown (Northern Illinois 14 - Miami 13)

Third Quarter

- Miami — T. Merriweather ran for 1-yard touchdown (Northern Illinois 14 - Miami 20)

Fourth Quarter

- Northern Illinois — Willie Clark caught a 39-yard pass from Harnish (Northern Illinois 21 - Miami 20)
- Miami — Austin Boucher passed to Armand Robinson for 33 yards (Northern Illinois 21 - Miami 26)
