= 2010 Eastern Michigan Eagles football team =

American college football season

2010 Eastern Michigan Eagles football
- Conference: Mid-American Conference
- West
- Record: 2–10 (2–6 MAC)
- Head coach: Ron English (2nd season)
- Offensive coordinator: Ken Karcher (2nd season)
- Offensive scheme: Multiple
- Defensive coordinator: Phil Snow (1st season)
- Base defense: 4–3
- Home stadium: Rynearson Stadium

2010 Mid-American Conference football standings
	Conf.			Overall
Team	W		L	W		L
East Division
Miami (OH) x$	7	–	1	10	–	4
Ohio	6	–	2	8	–	5
Temple	5	–	3	8	–	4
Kent State	4	–	4	5	–	7
Bowling Green	1	–	7	2	–	10
Buffalo	1	–	7	2	–	10
Akron	1	–	7	1	–	11
West Division
Northern Illinois x	8	–	0	11	–	3
Toledo	7	–	1	8	–	5
Western Michigan	5	–	3	6	–	6
Ball State	3	–	5	4	–	8
Central Michigan	2	–	6	3	–	9
Eastern Michigan	2	–	6	2	–	10
Championship: Miami 26, Northern Illinois 21
$ – Conference champion; x – Division champion/co-champions

The 2010 Eastern Michigan Eagles football team represented Eastern Michigan University during the 2010 NCAA Division I FBS football season. Eastern Michigan competed as a member of the Mid-American Conference (MAC) West Division, was coached by Ron English, and played their homes game at Rynearson Stadium. They finished the season 2–10, 2–6 in MAC play.

== Schedule ==
Date	Time	Opponent	Site	TV	Result	Attendance
September 4	7:00 pm	Army*	Rynearson Stadium; Ypsilanti, MI		L 27–31	11,318
September 11	2:00 pm	at Miami (OH)	Yager Stadium; Oxford, OH	STO	L 21–28	12,857
September 18	4:00 pm	Central Michigan	Rynearson Stadium; Ypsilanti, MI (rivalry)		L 14–52	20,348
September 25	3:30 pm	at No. 2 Ohio State*	Ohio Stadium; Columbus, OH	ABC/ESPN	L 20–73	105,017
October 2	12:00 pm	Ohio^{†}	Rynearson Stadium; Ypsilanti, MI	ESPN+	L 17–30	16,753
October 9	7:00 pm	at Vanderbilt*	Vanderbilt Stadium; Nashville, TN	ESPNU	L 6–52	33,107
October 16	1:00 pm	at Ball State	Scheumann Stadium; Muncie, IN		W 41–38 ^{OT}	10,956
October 23	6:00 pm	at Virginia*	Scott Stadium; Charlottesville, VA	ESPN3	L 21–48	37,386
October 30	4:00 pm	Toledo	Rynearson Stadium; Ypsilanti, MI	STO	L 7–42	25,860
November 13	2:00 pm	at Western Michigan	Waldo Stadium; Kalamazoo, MI (Michigan MAC Trophy)		L 30–45	12,136
November 20	2:00 pm	at Buffalo	University at Buffalo Stadium; Amherst, NY	STO	W 21–17	9,786
November 26	12:00 pm	Northern Illinois	Rynearson Stadium; Ypsilanti, MI	ESPNU	L 3–71	5,147
*Non-conference game; ^{†}Homecoming; Rankings from AP Poll released prior to the game; All times are in Eastern time

== Coaching staff ==
Following the disastrous 0-12 2009 season, head coach Ron English made major changes to the coaching staff, bringing in five new assistant coaches, most notably, defensive coordinator Phil Snow.

Name	Position	Year at school
Ron English	Head coach	2nd
Phil Snow	Defensive coordinator	1st
Steve Morrison	Linebackers coach	1st
Doug Downing	Running backs coach	1st

== Game summaries ==
=== Army ===
	1	2	3	4	Total
Black Knights	7	7	10	7	31
Eagles	7	7	6	7	27

The Army Black Knights defeated the Eastern Michigan Eagles for the third consecutive year, this being the second of the three decided by less than a touchdown. The game was tied twice and there were three lead changes. The teams combined for 594 yards rushing and only 96 yards passing. The game was delayed for about 12 minutes early in the second quarter when the public address system, the scoreboard, and the lights on the west (pressbox) side of the stadium went out. The lights eventually regained power, but the scoreboard and public address system remained inoperable for the remainder of the game. Notable performances included Army running back Jared Hassin's three touchdowns, 142 yards rushing by EMU's Dwayne Priest, and 126 yards rushing by EMU quarterback Alex Gillett.

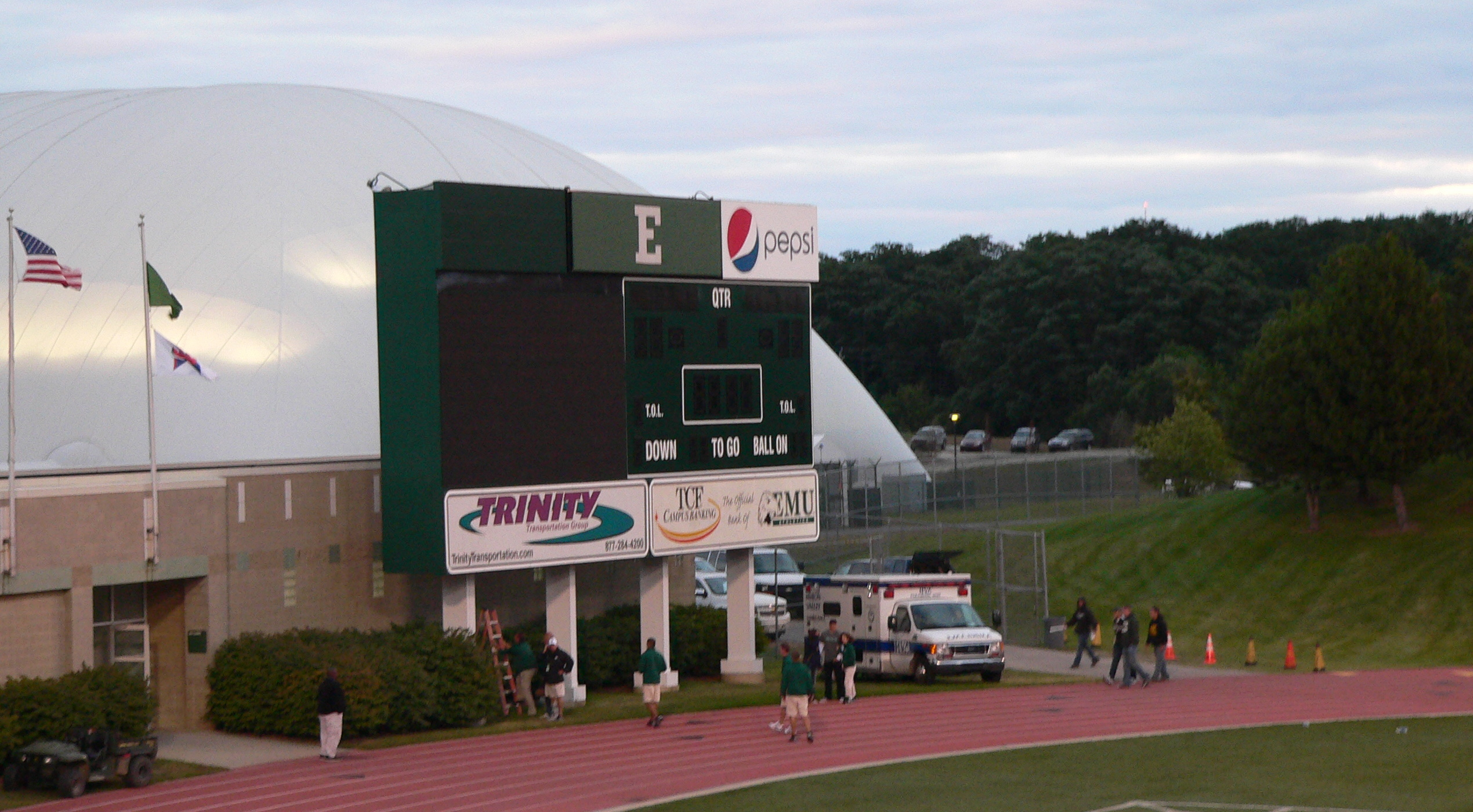
The scoreboard lost power early in the second quarter, and was not used for the remainder of the game.

For his performance in the game, Dwayne Priest was named the Mid-American Conference West Division Offensive Player of the Week.

Scoring summary

1st quarter

- 14:56 EMU - Dwayne Priest 5-yard run (Sean Graham kick) 0-7 EMU
- 6:01 Army - Jared Hassin 3-yard run (Alex Carlton kick) 7-7

2nd quarter

- 1:00 Army — Jared Hassin 3-yard run (Alex Carlton kick) 14-7 Army
- 0:35 EMU — Dwayne Priest 5-yard run (Sean Graham kick) 14-14

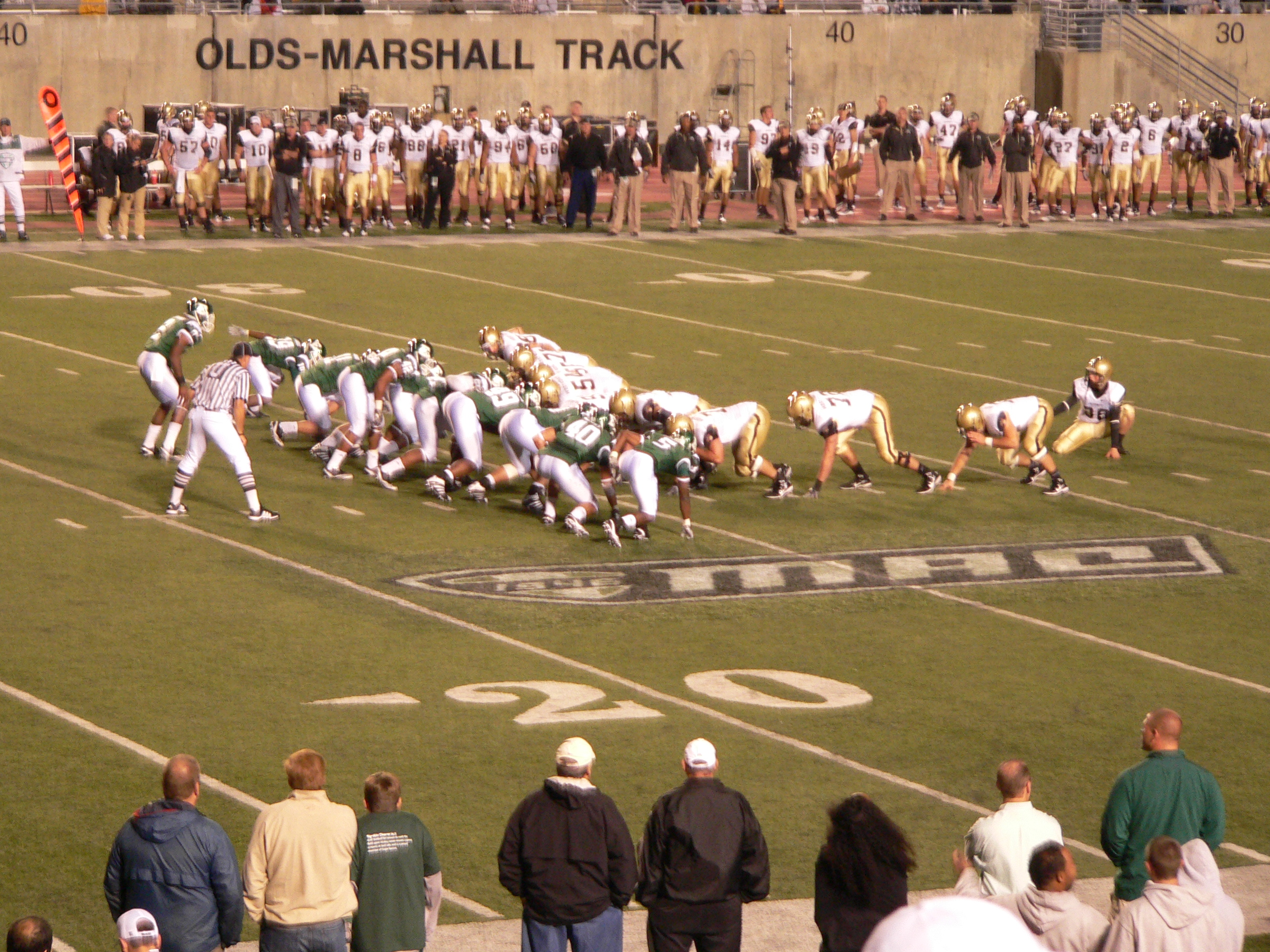
Army lines up for a field goal attempt early in the third quarter. The kick was good, giving the Black Knights a 24-14 lead, the biggest of the night.

3rd quarter

- 14:55 Army - Patrick Mealy 11-yard run (Alex Carlton kick) 21-14 Army
- 10:30 Army — Alex Carlton 42-yard field goal 24-14 Army
- 8:25 EMU - Alex Gillett 1-yard run (Sean Graham kick failed) 24-20 Army

4th quarter

- 3:03 EMU - Ben Thayer 10-yard pass from Alex Gillett (Sean Graham kick) 24-27 EMU
- 0:44 Army — Jared Hassin 7-yard run (Alex Carlton kick) 31-27 Army

=== Miami ===
	1	2	3	4	Total
Eagles	7	7	7	0	21
RedHawks	7	7	7	7	28

The RedHawks largely stifled the Eagles' running game, allowing only 66 yards on 32 carries. For Miami, Thomas Merriweather ran for 105 yards and three touchdowns on 15 carries. EMU managed to keep the game close, with the teams trading touchdowns, despite Alex Gillett throwing two interceptions and Devontae Payne throwing another. In the final minute, EMU drove to the Miami 21-yard line, but for the second straight week, was unable to reach the end zone as time expired. EMU sophomore punter Jay Karutz's kicks averaged 49.5 yards, breaking a 54-year-old school record.

For their performances in the game, Miami's Thomas Merriweather was named the Mid-American Conference West Division Offensive Player of the Week, and EMU's Jay Karutz was named the MAC West Division Special Teams Player of the Week. Karutz was also named an honorable mention choice for national Division I punter of the week.

Scoring summary

1st quarter

- 12:06 M-OH- Thomas Merriweather 23 Yd Run (Trevor Cook Kick) 7-0 M-OH
- 2:34 EMU- Kinsman Thomas 71 Yd Pass From Josh LeDuc (Sean Graham Kick) 7-7

2nd quarter

- 11:05 M-OH- Armand Robinson 24 Yd Pass From Zac Dysert (Trevor Cook Kick) 14-7 M-OH
- 00:28 EMU- LeDuc 11 Yd Pass From Alex Gillett (Sean Graham Kick) 14-14

3rd quarter

- 6:43 EMU- Thomas 40 Yd Pass From Alex Gillett (Sean Graham Kick) 21-14 EMU
- 4:00 M-OH- Thomas Merriweather 20 Yd Run (Trevor Cook Kick) 21-21

4th quarter

- 9:03 M-OH- Thomas Merriweather 9 Yd Run (Trevor Cook Kick) 28-21 M-OH

=== Central Michigan ===
	1	2	3	4	Total
Chippewas	14	7	14	17	52
Eagles	0	7	7	0	14

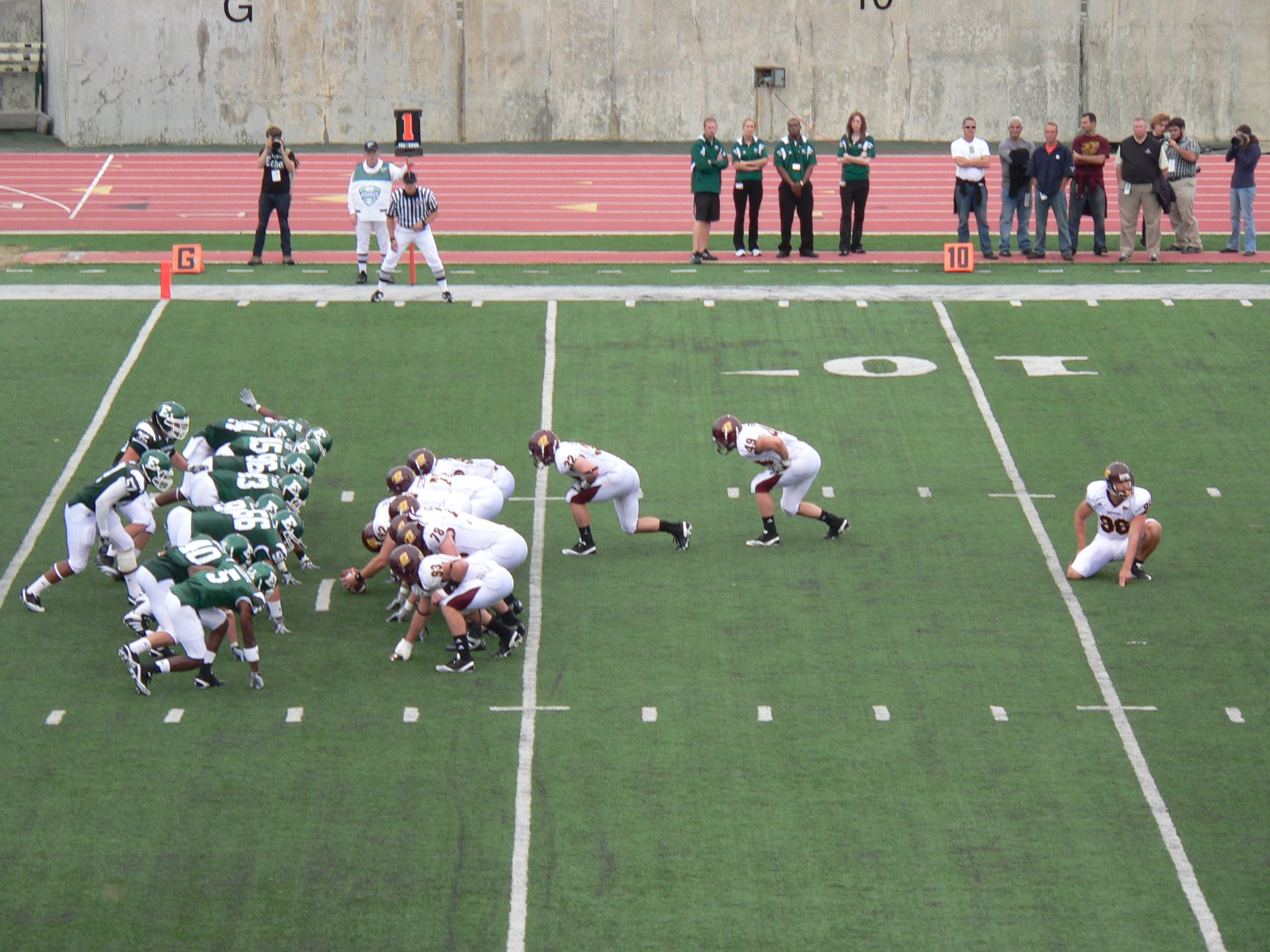
Central Michigan lined up for one of their seven converts against EMU.

Scoring summary

1st quarter

- 4:13 CMU — Cody Wilson 21-yard pass from Ryan Radcliff (David Harman kick) 7-0 CMU
- 0:47 CMU — Paris Cotton 13-yard run (David Harman kick) 14-0 CMU

2nd quarter

- 4:28 EMU — Dwayne Priest 2-yard run (Sean Graham kick) 14-7 CMU
- 1:45 CMU — Paris Cotton 1-yard run (David Harman kick) 21-7 CMU

3rd quarter

- 13:30 CMU — Paris Cotton 61-yard run (David Harman kick) 28-7 CMU
- 8:09 EMU — Donald Scott 52-yard pass from Alex Gillett (Sean Graham kick) 28-14 CMU
- 4:20 CMU — Kito Poblah 14-yard pass from Ryan Radcliff (David Harman kick) 35-14 CMU

4th quarter

- 13:42 CMU — Mike Petrucci 43-yard fumble return (David Harman kick) 42-14 CMU
- 8:09 CMU — David Harman 41-yard field goal 45-14 CMU
- 6:25 CMU — Zurlon Tipton 20-yard run (David Harman kick) 52-14 CMU

=== Ohio State ===
	1	2	3	4	Total
Eagles	0	14	6	0	20
#2 Buckeyes	24	14	14	21	73

For the first-ever meeting between the two schools, Ohio State paid Eastern Michigan $850,000. This is the first time Eastern Michigan has played a team ranked higher than #10 in a national poll. Ohio State coach Jim Tressel came into the game with a 1-4 record against Eastern Michigan; when he was the head coach at Division I-AA Youngstown State the teams played annually from 1986-1990.

For his performance in the game, Terrelle Pryor was named the Big Ten Offensive Player of the Week. Pryor completed 20 of 26 passes for 224 yards and four touchdowns.

Ohio State's win was subsequently vacated as part of the penalties for major NCAA violations, including the use of ineligible players.

Scoring summary

1st quarter

2nd quarter

3rd quarter

4th quarter

=== Ohio ===
	1	2	3	4	Total
Bobcats	3	7	20	0	30
Eagles	7	3	0	7	17

Scoring summary

1st quarter

2nd quarter

3rd quarter

4th quarter

=== Vanderbilt ===
	1	2	3	4	Total
Eagles	3	0	3	0	6
Commodores	7	24	14	7	52

Scoring summary

1st quarter

2nd quarter

3rd quarter

4th quarter

=== Ball State ===
	1	2	3	4	OT	Total
Eagles	0	14	14	7	6	41
Cardinals	7	21	0	7	3	38

Alex Gillett was named the MAC West Division Offensive Player of the Week. Ben Thayer was named the John Mackey tight end of the week by the Nassau County Sports Commission.

Scoring summary

1st quarter

2nd quarter

3rd quarter

4th quarter

=== Virginia ===
	1	2	3	4	Total
Eagles	7	7	7	0	21
Cavaliers	14	3	14	17	48

Scoring summary

1st quarter

2nd quarter

3rd quarter

4th quarter

=== Toledo ===
	1	2	3	4	Total
Rockets	8	7	14	13	42
Eagles	0	7	0	0	7

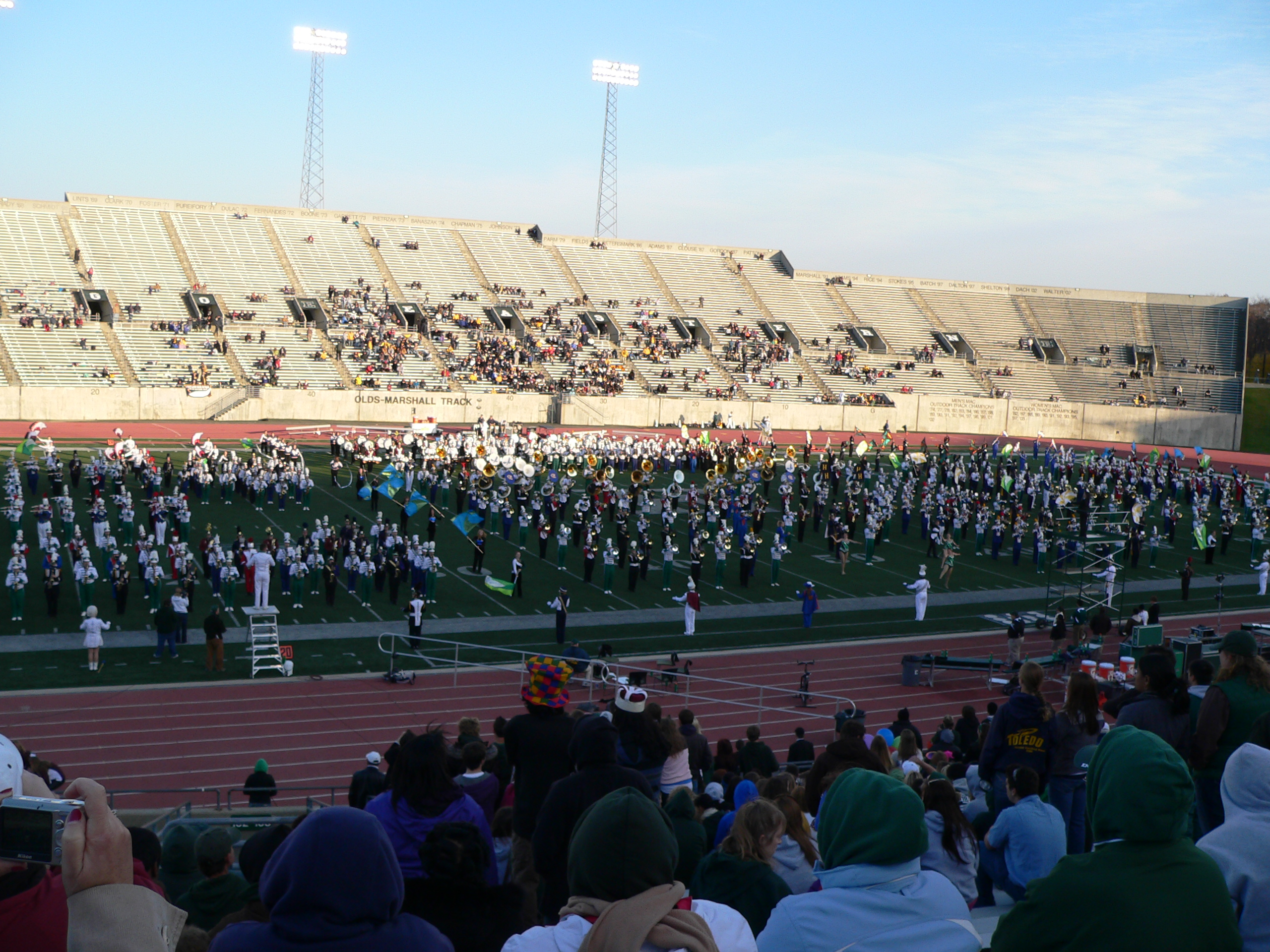
The special "Band Day" halftime show featured the EMU Marching Band along with 12 high school bands.

Scoring summary

1st quarter

2nd quarter

3rd quarter

4th quarter

=== Western Michigan ===
	1	2	3	4	Total
Eagles	7	14	3	6	30
Broncos	14	10	7	14	45

Scoring summary

1st quarter

2nd quarter

3rd quarter

4th quarter

=== Buffalo ===
	1	2	3	4	Total
Eagles	0	14	7	0	21
Bulls	0	10	7	0	17

Scoring summary

1st quarter

2nd quarter

- 13:36 EMU — Dwayne Priest 1 Yd Run (Sean Graham Kick) 7-0 EMU
- 07:35 BUFF — Marcus Rivers 28 Yd Pass From Jerry Davis (A.J. Principe Kick) 7-7
- 03:03 EMU — Dwayne Priest 1 Yd Run (Sean Graham Kick) 14-7 EMU
- 00:00 BUFF — A.J. Principe 30 Yd 14-10 EMU

3rd quarter

4th quarter

=== Northern Illinois ===
	1	2	3	4	Total
Huskies	20	17	21	13	71
Eagles	0	3	0	0	3

Northern Illinois had 654 yards on 46 plays, rushing for 552 yards, with most of the starters on the sideline for the second half. The Huskies (10-2, 8-0 MAC) swept MAC play for the first time in school history and went on to represent the West Division against Miami (8-4, 7-1) in the MAC Championship. It was the 5th most points scored by the Huskies in school history.

For his performance in the game, Northern Illinois defensive end Jake Coffman was named MAC West Division Defensive Player of the Week. Coffman finished with five solo tackles, one sack, two tackles for loss and a forced fumble.

Scoring summary

1st quarter

2nd quarter

3rd quarter

4th quarter
