= 2010 Miami RedHawks football team =

American college football season

2010 Miami RedHawks football

MAC champion MAC East Division champion GoDaddy.com Bowl champion

MAC Championship, W 26–21 vs. Northern Illinois

GoDaddy.com Bowl, W 35–21 vs. Middle Tennessee
- Conference: Mid-American Conference
- East Division
- Record: 10–4 (7–1 MAC)
- Head coach: Michael Haywood (2nd season; regular season); Lance Guidry (interim, bowl game)
- Offensive coordinator: Morris Watts (1st season)
- Offensive scheme: Spread
- Defensive coordinator: Carl Reese (2nd season)
- Base defense: 4–3
- Home stadium: Yager Stadium

2010 Mid-American Conference football standings
	Conf.			Overall
Team	W		L	W		L
East Division
Miami (OH) x$	7	–	1	10	–	4
Ohio	6	–	2	8	–	5
Temple	5	–	3	8	–	4
Kent State	4	–	4	5	–	7
Bowling Green	1	–	7	2	–	10
Buffalo	1	–	7	2	–	10
Akron	1	–	7	1	–	11
West Division
Northern Illinois x	8	–	0	11	–	3
Toledo	7	–	1	8	–	5
Western Michigan	5	–	3	6	–	6
Ball State	3	–	5	4	–	8
Central Michigan	2	–	6	3	–	9
Eastern Michigan	2	–	6	2	–	10
Championship: Miami 26, Northern Illinois 21
$ – Conference champion; x – Division champion/co-champions

The 2010 Miami RedHawks football team represented Miami University during the 2010 NCAA Division I FBS football season. The RedHawks, led by second-year head coach Michael Haywood and interim head coach Lance Guidry during their bowl game, competed in the East Division of the Mid-American Conference and played their home games at Yager Stadium. They finished the season 10–4, 7–1 in MAC play and were East Division champions. They advanced to the MAC Championship where they defeated Northern Illinois 26–21 to become MAC champions. They were invited to the GoDaddy.com Bowl where they defeated Middle Tennessee 35–21. They became the first team in college football history to win ten games the year after they lost ten or more games (1–11 in 2009).

== Schedule ==
Date	Time	Opponent	Site	TV	Result	Attendance	Source
September 4	12:00 p.m.	at No. 4 Florida*	Ben Hill Griffin Stadium; Gainesville, FL	ESPN	L 12–34	90,178	
September 11	2:00 p.m.	Eastern Michigan	Yager Stadium; Oxford, OH	ONN, STO	W 28–21	12,857	
September 18	3:30 p.m.	Colorado State*	Yager Stadium; Oxford, OH	ONN	W 31–10	16,691	
September 25	2:00 p.m.	at Missouri*	Faurot Field; Columbia, MO		L 13–51	60,329	
October 2	1:00 p.m.	Kent State	Yager Stadium; Oxford, OH		W 27–21	17,666	
October 9	7:00 p.m.	at Cincinnati*	Nippert Stadium; Cincinnati, OH (Victory Bell)	ESPN3	L 3–45	33,909	
October 16	12:00 p.m.	at Central Michigan	Kelly/Shorts Stadium; Mount Pleasant, MI	ESPN Plus	W 27–20	24,761	
October 23	1:00 p.m.	Ohio^{†}	Yager Stadium; Oxford, OH (Battle of the Bricks)		L 13–34	17,144	
October 30	3:30 p.m.	at Buffalo	University at Buffalo Stadium; Amherst, NY		W 21–9	12,786	
November 10	8:00 p.m.	at Bowling Green	Doyt Perry Stadium; Bowling Green, OH	ESPN2	W 24–21	12,073	
November 17	6:00 p.m.	at Akron	InfoCision Stadium–Summa Field; Akron, OH	ESPNU	W 19–14	7,671	
November 23	7:00 p.m.	Temple	Yager Stadium; Oxford, OH	ESPN2	W 23–3	13,235	
December 3	7:00 p.m.	vs. No. 24 Northern Illinois	Ford Field; Detroit, MI (MAC Championship Game)	ESPN2	W 26–21	12,031	
January 6, 2011	8:00 p.m.	vs. Middle Tennessee*	Ladd–Peebles Stadium; Mobile, AL (GoDaddy.com Bowl)	ESPN	W 35–21	38,168	
*Non-conference game; ^{†}Homecoming; Rankings from AP Poll released prior to the game; All times are in Eastern time

== Coaching change ==
It was announced that Mike Haywood would be leaving the RedHawks immediately on December 16, 2010, so that he could be hired to take over the program at the University of Pittsburgh. Miami named defensive backs coach Lance Guidry as the interim head coach for the bowl game. 2 weeks after taking the Pitt job, Haywood was arrested in South Bend, Indiana on December 31, 2010, on felony domestic violence charges. He was released on bond on January 1, 2011, and only hours later was fired by Pitt before ever coaching a game.
