= 2010 Western Michigan Broncos football team =

American college football season

2010 Western Michigan Broncos football
- Conference: Mid-American Conference
- West
- Record: 6–6 (5–3 MAC)
- Head coach: Bill Cubit (6th season)
- Offensive scheme: Multiple
- Defensive coordinator: Dave Cohen (1st season)
- Base defense: 3–4
- Home stadium: Waldo Stadium

2010 Mid-American Conference football standings
	Conf.			Overall
Team	W		L	W		L
East Division
Miami (OH) x$	7	–	1	10	–	4
Ohio	6	–	2	8	–	5
Temple	5	–	3	8	–	4
Kent State	4	–	4	5	–	7
Bowling Green	1	–	7	2	–	10
Buffalo	1	–	7	2	–	10
Akron	1	–	7	1	–	11
West Division
Northern Illinois x	8	–	0	11	–	3
Toledo	7	–	1	8	–	5
Western Michigan	5	–	3	6	–	6
Ball State	3	–	5	4	–	8
Central Michigan	2	–	6	3	–	9
Eastern Michigan	2	–	6	2	–	10
Championship: Miami 26, Northern Illinois 21
$ – Conference champion; x – Division champion/co-champions

The 2010 Western Michigan Broncos football team represented Western Michigan University during the 2010 NCAA Division I FBS football season. The Broncos, led by sixth-year head coach Bill Cubit, compete in the West Division of the Mid-American Conference and played their home games at Waldo Stadium. They finished the season 6–6, 5–3 in MAC play.

Western Michigan, along with Temple, were the only bowl eligible teams that did not receive an invitation to a postseason bowl game.

== Schedule ==
Date	Time	Opponent	Site	TV	Result	Attendance
September 4	Noon	at Michigan State*	Spartan Stadium; East Lansing, MI	ESPN2	L 14–38	75,769
September 11	7:00 pm	Nicholls State*	Waldo Stadium; Kalamazoo, MI		W 49–14	19,327
September 18	7:00 pm	Toledo	Waldo Stadium; Kalamazoo, MI		L 24–37	14,216
October 2	2:00 pm	Idaho*^{†}	Waldo Stadium; Kalamazoo, MI	ESPN3	L 13–33	18,508
October 9	Noon	at Ball State	Scheumann Stadium; Muncie, IN	ESPN+/ESPN3	W 45–16	11,963
October 16	2:30 pm	at Notre Dame*	Notre Dame Stadium; Notre Dame, IN	NBC	L 20–44	80,795
October 23	3:30 pm	at Akron	InfoCision Stadium; Akron, OH	STO	W 56–10	10,073
October 30	Noon	Northern Illinois	Waldo Stadium; Kalamazoo, MI	ESPN+/ESPN3	L 21–28	12,578
November 5	6:00 pm	at Central Michigan	Kelly/Shorts Stadium; Mount Pleasant, MI (WMU–CMU Rivalry Trophy, Michigan MAC Trophy)	ESPNU	L 22–26	22,355
November 13	2:00 pm	Eastern Michigan	Waldo Stadium; Kalamazoo, MI (Michigan MAC Trophy)		W 45–30	12,136
November 20	2:00 pm	Kent State	Waldo Stadium; Kalamazoo, MI		W 38–3	8,763
November 26	2:00 pm	at Bowling Green	Doyt Perry Stadium; Bowling Green, OH	ESPN3	W 41–7	5,121
*Non-conference game; ^{†}Homecoming; All times are in Eastern time
