= Rob Ianello =

American football coach (born 1965)

Current position
- Title: General manager
- Team: Kansas
- Conference: Big 12

Biographical details
- Born: November 4, 1965 (age 60); Port Chester, New York, U.S.
- Education: The Catholic University of America

Coaching career (HC unless noted)
- 1988–1989: Alabama (assistant)
- 1990–1993: Wisconsin (assistant)
- 1994–2002: Arizona (assistant)
- 2003–2004: Wisconsin (TE)
- 2005–2009: Notre Dame (WR/RC)
- 2010–2011: Akron
- 2012–2013: Kansas (WR/RC)
- 2015–2020: Buffalo (AHC/WR/RC)
- 2021–present: Kansas (GM)

Head coaching record
- Overall: 2–22

Robert S. Ianello (born November 4, 1965) is an American college football coach. He is the general manager with the Kansas Jayhawks, a position he had held since the 2021 season. Ianello served as the head football coach at the University of Akron from 2010 to 2011, compiling a record of 2–22. He was fired after the 2011 season. He succeeded J. D. Brookhart, who was relieved of his duties after the 2009 season in which the Akron Zips went 3–9. Before he was hired at Akron, Ianello had been an assistant football coach since 1988, including stints at the University of Alabama, the University of Wisconsin, the University of Arizona, and the University of Notre Dame.

== Assistant coach ==
For two years, Ianello was tight ends coach at the University of Wisconsin–Madison, when he then moved to the University of Notre Dame to be receivers coach and recruiting coordinator. Ianello briefly oversaw the Notre Dame football program after head coach Charlie Weis was fired and before Brian Kelly was hired.

== Akron ==
In December 2009, Akron hired Ianello as football coach. He lost his first 11 games as a head coach before beating Buffalo in the final game of the 2010 season. His only other win as Akron's coach was a 36–13 defeat of VMI in 2011. Ianello was dismissed as Akron's head coach after just two seasons.

== Personal life ==
Ianello is a native of Port Chester, New York and a 1987 graduate of The Catholic University of America where he received a bachelor's degree in English. He and his wife have three children.

== Head coaching record ==
| Year | Team | Overall | Conference | Standing | Bowl/playoffs |
|---|---|---|---|---|---|
Akron Zips (Mid-American Conference) (2010–2011)
| 2010 | Akron | 1–11 | 1–7 | T–5th (East) | |
| 2011 | Akron | 1–11 | 0–8 | 7th (East) | |
| Akron: | | 2–22 | 1–15 | | |
| Total: | | 2–22 | | | |
