= 2010 Akron Zips football team =

American college football season

2010 Akron Zips football
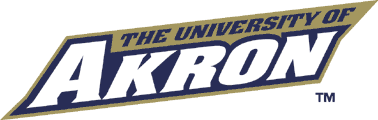
- Conference: Mid-American Conference
- East
- Record: 1–11 (1–7 MAC)
- Head coach: Rob Ianello (1st season)
- Offensive coordinator: John Latina (1st season)
- Defensive coordinator: Curt Mallory (1st season)
- Home stadium: InfoCision Stadium–Summa Field

2010 Mid-American Conference football standings
	Conf.			Overall
Team	W		L	W		L
East Division
Miami (OH) x$	7	–	1	10	–	4
Ohio	6	–	2	8	–	5
Temple	5	–	3	8	–	4
Kent State	4	–	4	5	–	7
Bowling Green	1	–	7	2	–	10
Buffalo	1	–	7	2	–	10
Akron	1	–	7	1	–	11
West Division
Northern Illinois x	8	–	0	11	–	3
Toledo	7	–	1	8	–	5
Western Michigan	5	–	3	6	–	6
Ball State	3	–	5	4	–	8
Central Michigan	2	–	6	3	–	9
Eastern Michigan	2	–	6	2	–	10
Championship: Miami 26, Northern Illinois 21
$ – Conference champion; x – Division champion/co-champions

The 2010 Akron Zips football team represented the University of Akron during the 2010 NCAA Division I FBS football season. The Zips, led by first-year head coach Rob Ianello, competed in the East Division of the Mid-American Conference and played their home games at InfoCision Stadium – Summa Field. They finished the season 1–11, 1–7 in MAC play.

== Schedule ==
Date	Time	Opponent	Site	TV	Result	Attendance
September 4	6:00 p.m.	Syracuse*	InfoCision Stadium; Akron, OH	ESPN3	L 3–29	15,969
September 11	Noon	Gardner–Webb*	InfoCision Stadium; Akron, OH		L 37–38 ^{OT}	10,046
September 18	7:00 p.m.	at Kentucky*	Commonwealth Stadium; Lexington, KY	FS South	L 10–47	64,014
September 25	7:00 p.m.	at Indiana*	Memorial Stadium; Bloomington, IN	BTN	L 20–35	42,258
October 2	6:00 p.m.	Northern Illinois^{†}	InfoCision Stadium; Akron, OH		L 14–50	12,133
October 9	3:30 p.m.	at Kent State	Dix Stadium; Kent, OH (Battle for the Wagon Wheel)	STO	L 17–28	24,221
October 16	2:00 p.m.	at Ohio	Peden Stadium; Athens, OH		L 10–38	21,645
October 23	3:30 p.m.	Western Michigan	InfoCision Stadium; Akron, OH	STO	L 10–56	10,073
October 30	1:00 p.m.	at Temple	Lincoln Financial Field; Philadelphia, PA		L 0–30	17,563
November 6	1:00 p.m.	at Ball State	Scheumann Stadium; Muncie, IN		L 30–37 ^{2OT}	5,377
November 17	6:00 p.m.	Miami (OH)	InfoCision Stadium; Akron, OH	ESPNU	L 14–19	7,671
November 26	2:00 p.m.	Buffalo	InfoCision Stadium; Akron, OH	STO	W 22–14	5,216
*Non-conference game; ^{†}Homecoming; All times are in Eastern time
