= Michael Haywood =

American football player and coach (born 1964)

Biographical details
- Born: February 26, 1964 (age 62); Houston, Texas, U.S.

Playing career
- 1984–1986: Notre Dame
- Positions: Wide receiver, defensive back

Coaching career (HC unless noted)
- 1988: Minnesota (GA)
- 1989–1990: Army (DB/DE/ST)
- 1991–1992: Ohio (OLB/ST)
- 1993–1994: Ball State (WR/RB/ST)
- 1995–2002: LSU (RB/ST)
- 2003–2004: Texas (RB/ST)
- 2005–2008: Notre Dame (OC/RB)
- 2009–2010: Miami (OH)
- 2016–2018: Texas Southern

Head coaching record
- Overall: 18–40

Accomplishments and honors

Awards
- AFCA NCAA I-A Assistant Coach of the Year (2005); MAC Coach of the Year (2010)

Michael Anthony Haywood (born February 26, 1964) is an American former college football player and coach. He served as the head football coach at Miami University in Oxford, Ohio from 2009 to 2010 and Texas Southern University (TSU) from 2016 to 2018, compiling a career head coaching record of 18–40. Haywood was as an assistant coach at various other universities for 21 seasons. He was initially hired as the head football coach at the University of Pittsburgh in December 2010, but was fired from that position shortly thereafter following domestic violence charges. Haywood played football at the University of Notre Dame as a wide receiver and defensive back from 1984 to 1986.

== Early life ==
Haywood was born in Houston, Texas. He attended St. Thomas High School in Houston and then the University of Notre Dame where he played as a wide receiver wearing jersey #1.

== Early coaching career ==
Haywood served as an assistant at several college football programs, most notably under Nick Saban at LSU, under Mack Brown at Texas and under Charlie Weis at his alma mater Notre Dame. In December 2007, Haywood was considered one of the two leading candidates for the head coaching position at the University of Houston, alongside Jack Pardee. However, the job eventually went to Kevin Sumlin.

== Head coaching career ==
=== Miami (OH) ===
In December 2008, Haywood was named the head coach of the Miami RedHawks. He replaced Shane Montgomery. After going 1–11 in his first season, Haywood led the Redhawks to an 8–4 record in his second season and a MAC East title. The Redhawks then emerged victorious in the 2010 MAC Championship Game against Northern Illinois University, winning by a final score of 26–21. He was named the 2010 Mid-American Conference football coach of the year.

=== Pittsburgh ===
On December 16, 2010, Haywood was offered and accepted the head football coaching position at the University of Pittsburgh. However, Haywood was arrested in South Bend, Indiana on December 31, 2010, on felony domestic violence charges. He was released on bond on January 1, 2011, and only hours later was fired by Pitt. In February 2012, the domestic violence charges were dismissed after Haywood completed pre-trial diversion requirements, counseling, and public service.

Haywood interviewed for the Tulane head coaching position in November 2011. However, the job went to Curtis Johnson.

=== Texas Southern ===
On December 3, 2015, Haywood was offered and accepted the head football coaching position at Texas Southern University in Houston, Texas. He replaced Darrell Asberry who resigned after a 12–31 record in four years at Texas Southern. Haywood resigned in 2018 after three years as the TSU Head Coach.

== Head coaching record ==
| Year | Team | Overall | Conference | Standing | Bowl/playoffs |
|---|---|---|---|---|---|
Miami RedHawks (Mid-American Conference) (2009–2010)
| 2009 | Miami | 1–11 | 1–7 | 7th (East) | |
| 2010 | Miami | 9–4 | 7–1 | 1st (East) | GoDaddy.com* |
| Miami: | | 10–15 | 8–8 | *Lance Guidry coached bowl game | |
Texas Southern Tigers (Southwestern Athletic Conference) (2016–2018)
| 2016 | Texas Southern | 4–7 | 4–5 | 4th (West) | |
| 2017 | Texas Southern | 2–9 | 2–6 | 4th (West) | |
| 2018 | Texas Southern | 2–9 | 1–6 | T–4th (West) | |
| Texas Southern: | | 8–25 | 7–17 | | |
| Total: | | 18–40 | | | |
National championship Conference title Conference division title or championship game berth
