= Willie Moseley =

American gridiron football player (born 1990)

Profile
- Position: Linebacker

Personal information
- Born: April 5, 1990 (age 36); Richmond, Virginia, U.S.
- Listed height: 6 ft 5 in (1.96 m)
- Listed weight: 251 lb (114 kg)

Career information
- College: Buffalo
- NFL draft: 2013: undrafted

Career history
- Tampa Bay Buccaneers (2013); Winnipeg Blue Bombers (2014)
- Stats at CFL.ca (archive)

Willie Moseley (born April 5, 1990) is an American former professional football linebacker.

== College career ==
Moseley played high school football at Varina High School in Richmond, VA. He played college football at Buffalo.

== Professional career ==
=== Tampa Bay Buccaneers ===
On April 29, 2013, Moseley was signed as an undrafted free agent by the Tampa Bay Buccaneers. He was waived from the team on May 17.

=== Winnipeg Blue Bombers ===
Moseley had worked out for the Toronto Argonauts of the Canadian Football League. Was signed by the Winnipeg Blue Bombers of the Canadian Football League prior to the 2014 training camp. Was released prior to the 2014 CFL season but re-signed to the practice roster of the Blue Bombers. He was released by the Winnipeg Blue Bombers on October 17, 2014.
