= Miami RedHawks football statistical leaders =

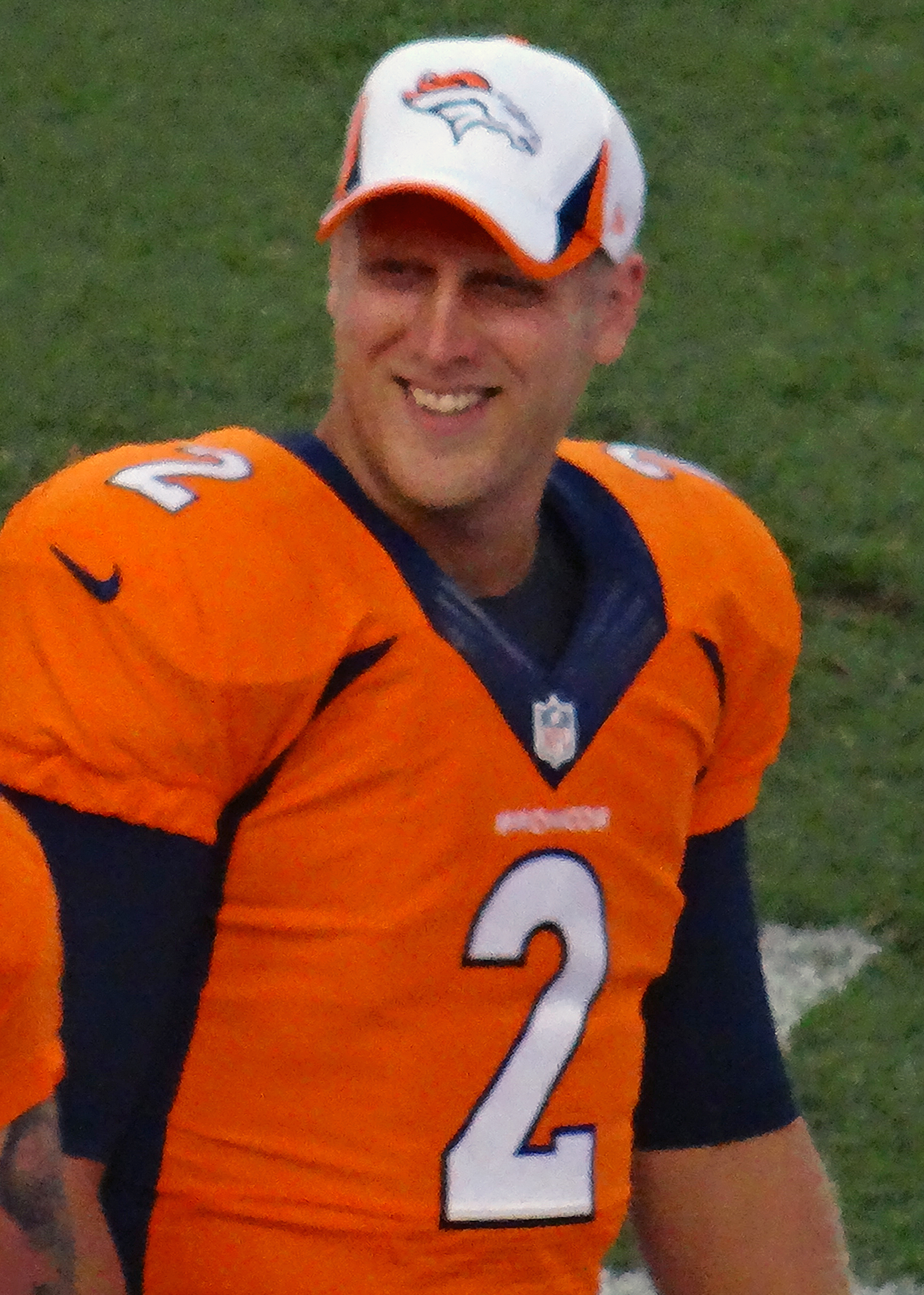
Zac Dysert is Miami's all-time leader in passing yards.

The Miami RedHawks football statistical leaders are individual statistical leaders of the Miami RedHawks football program in various categories, including passing, rushing, receiving, total offense, defensive stats, and kicking. Within those areas, the lists identify single-game, single-season, and career leaders. The RedHawks represent Miami University in the NCAA's Mid-American Conference.

Although Miami began competing in intercollegiate football in 1888, the school's official record book considers the "modern era" to have begun in 1948. Records from before this year are often incomplete and inconsistent, and they are generally not included in these lists.

These lists are dominated by more recent players for several reasons:

- Since 1948, seasons have increased from 10 games to 11 and then 12 games in length.
- The NCAA didn't allow freshmen to play varsity football until 1972 (with the exception of the World War II years), allowing players to have four-year careers.
- Bowl games only began counting toward single-season and career statistics in 2002. The RedHawks have played seven extra games since this decision: four bowl games and four appearances in the MAC Championship Game, giving many recent players an extra chance to accumulate statistics.

These lists are updated through the end of the 2025 season.

== Passing ==
=== Passing yards ===
Career
| Rk | Player | Yards | Years |
|---|---|---|---|
| 1 | Zac Dysert | 12,013 | 2009 2010 2011 2012 |
| 2 | Ben Roethlisberger | 10,829 | 2001 2002 2003 |
| 3 | Brett Gabbert | 10,184 | 2019 2020 2021 2022 2023 2024 |
| 4 | Josh Betts | 7,029 | 2002 2003 2004 2005 |
| 5 | Mike Bath | 6,524 | 1997 1998 1999 2000 |
| 6 | Gus Ragland | 6,312 | 2015 2016 2017 2018 |
| 7 | Sam Ricketts | 5,870 | 1994 1995 1996 1997 |
| 8 | Daniel Raudabaugh | 5,352 | 2006 2007 2008 2009 |
| 9 | Neil Dougherty | 4,074 | 1991 1992 1993 1994 1995 |
| 10 | Terry Morris | 3,836 | 1985 1986 |

Single season
| Rk | Player | Yards | Year |
|---|---|---|---|
| 1 | Ben Roethlisberger | 4,486 | 2003 |
| 2 | Zac Dysert | 3,513 | 2011 |
| 3 | Josh Betts | 3,495 | 2004 |
| 4 | Zac Dysert | 3,483 | 2012 |
| 5 | Andrew Hendrix | 3,280 | 2014 |
| 6 | Ben Roethlisberger | 3,238 | 2002 |
| 7 | Josh Betts | 3,178 | 2005 |
| 8 | Ben Roethlisberger | 3,105 | 2001 |
| 9 | Brett Gabbert | 2,921 | 2024 |
| 10 | Brett Gabbert | 2,646 | 2021 |

Single game
| Rk | Player | Yards | Year | Opponent |
|---|---|---|---|---|
| 1 | Ben Roethlisberger | 525 | 2002 | Northern Illinois |
| 2 | Zac Dysert | 516 | 2012 | Akron |
| 3 | Brett Gabbert | 492 | 2021 | Ohio |
| 4 | Zac Dysert | 455 | 2012 | Kent State |
| 5 | Ben Roethlisberger | 452 | 2001 | Hawai’i |
| 6 | Ben Roethlisberger | 440 | 2003 | Bowling Green |
| 7 | Andrew Hendrix | 437 | 2014 | UMass |
| 8 | Zac Dysert | 426 | 2009 | Temple |
| 9 | Josh Betts | 416 | 2004 | Cincinnati |
| 10 | Zac Dysert | 413 | 2011 | Western Michigan |

=== Passing touchdowns ===
Career
| Rk | Player | TDs | Years |
|---|---|---|---|
| 1 | Ben Roethlisberger | 84 | 2001 2002 2003 |
| 2 | Brett Gabbert | 80 | 2019 2020 2021 2022 2023 2024 |
| 3 | Zac Dysert | 73 | 2009 2010 2011 2012 |
| 4 | Gus Ragland | 56 | 2015 2016 2017 2018 |
| 5 | Josh Betts | 54 | 2002 2003 2004 2005 |
| 6 | Mike Bath | 49 | 1997 1998 1999 2000 |
| 7 | Sam Ricketts | 44 | 1994 1995 1996 1997 |
| 8 | Mel Olix | 28 | 1946 1947 1948 1949 |
| 9 | Larry Fortner | 27 | 1975 1976 1977 1978 |
| | Neil Dougherty | 27 | 1991 1992 1993 1994 1995 |

Single season
| Rk | Player | TDs | Year |
|---|---|---|---|
| 1 | Ben Roethlisberger | 37 | 2003 |
| 2 | Josh Betts | 27 | 2005 |
| 3 | Brett Gabbert | 26 | 2021 |
| 4 | Ben Roethlisberger | 25 | 2001 |
| | Zac Dysert | 25 | 2012 |
| 6 | Mike Bath | 24 | 1999 |
| 7 | Josh Betts | 23 | 2004 |
| 8 | Zac Dysert | 23 | 2011 |
| 9 | Andrew Hendrix | 23 | 2014 |
| 10 | Ben Roethlisberger | 22 | 2002 |

Single game
| Rk | Player | TDs | Year | Opponent |
|---|---|---|---|---|
| 1 | Zac Dysert | 6 | 2012 | Akron |
| 2 | Sam Ricketts | 5 | 1995 | Akron |
| | Ben Roethlisberger | 5 | 2001 | Ohio |
| | Ben Roethlisberger | 5 | 2003 | UCF |
| | Brett Gabbert | 5 | 2021 | Ohio |
| 6 | 26 times by 12 players | 4 | Most recent: Brett Gabbert, 2024 vs. Eastern Michigan | |

== Rushing ==
=== Rushing yards ===
Career
| Rk | Player | Yards | Years |
|---|---|---|---|
| 1 | Travis Prentice | 5,596 | 1996 1997 1998 1999 |
| 2 | Deland McCullough | 4,368 | 1992 1993 1994 1995 |
| 3 | George Swarn | 4,172 | 1983 1984 1985 1986 |
| 4 | Bob Hitchens | 3,118 | 1971 1972 1973 |
| 5 | Jay Peterson | 2,874 | 1980 1981 1982 1983 |
| 6 | Greg Jones | 2,839 | 1978 1979 1980 1981 |
| 7 | Rob Carpenter | 2,789 | 1973 1974 1975 1976 |
| 8 | Alonzo Smith | 2,613 | 2015 2016 2017 2018 |
| 9 | John Pont | 2,457 | 1949 1950 1951 |
| 10 | Terry Carter | 2,400 | 1990 1991 1992 1993 1994 |

Single season
| Rk | Player | Yards | Year |
|---|---|---|---|
| 1 | Travis Prentice | 1,787 | 1998 |
| 2 | Travis Prentice | 1,659 | 1999 |
| 3 | Deland McCullough | 1,627 | 1995 |
| 4 | Travis Prentice | 1,549 | 1997 |
| 5 | George Swarn | 1,511 | 1985 |
| 6 | Bob Hitchens | 1,370 | 1972 |
| 7 | George Swarn | 1,282 | 1984 |
| 8 | Wilbur Cartwright | 1,168 | 1930 |
| 9 | Bob Hitchens | 1,157 | 1971 |
| 10 | Jay Peterson | 1,157 | 1982 |

Single game
| Rk | Player | Yards | Year | Opponent |
|---|---|---|---|---|
| 1 | Travis Prentice | 376 | 1999 | Akron |
| 2 | George Swarn | 326 | 1985 | Eastern Michigan |
| 3 | Terry Carter | 250 | 1990 | Ohio |
| 4 | George Swarn | 239 | 1984 | Western Michigan |
| | Travis Prentice | 239 | 1997 | Northern Illinois |
| 6 | Travis Prentice | 237 | 1998 | Ohio |
| 7 | Al Moore | 232 | 1967 | Ohio |
| 8 | Travis Prentice | 227 | 1997 | Ohio |
| 9 | Travis Prentice | 227 | 1998 | Toledo |
| 10 | Steve Little | 222 | 2000 | Buffalo |

=== Rushing touchdowns ===
Career
| Rk | Player | TDs | Years |
|---|---|---|---|
| 1 | Travis Prentice | 73 | 1996 1997 1998 1999 |
| 2 | Deland McCullough | 36 | 1992 1993 1994 1995 |
| 3 | Bob Hitchens | 34 | 1971 1972 1973 |
| 4 | Luke Clemens | 29 | 2001 2002 2003 2004 |
| 5 | Mike Smith | 26 | 2001 2002 2003 2004 |
| | Rob Carpenter | 26 | 1973 1974 1975 1976 |
| 7 | John Pont | 25 | 1949 1950 1951 |
| 8 | Mark Hunter | 24 | 1976 1977 1978 1979 |
| 9 | Tom Pagna | 23 | 1951 1952 1953 1954 |
| | Cal Murray | 23 | 2000 2001 2002 2003 |

Single season
| Rk | Player | TDs | Year |
|---|---|---|---|
| 1 | Travis Prentice | 25 | 1997 |
| 2 | Travis Prentice | 19 | 1998 |
| 3 | Travis Prentice | 17 | 1999 |
| | Mike Smith | 17 | 2003 |
| 5 | Luke Clemens | 16 | 2002 |
| 6 | Bob Hitchens | 15 | 1972 |
| 7 | Deland McCullough | 14 | 1995 |
| | Jaylon Bester | 14 | 2019 |
| 9 | Tom Pagna | 13 | 1952 |
| | Bob Hitchens | 13 | 1971 |
| | Rashad Amos | 13 | 2023 |

Single game
| Rk | Player | TDs | Year | Opponent |
|---|---|---|---|---|
| 1 | Bob Hitchens | 4 | 1972 | Dayton |
| | Sherman Smith | 4 | 1975 | Western Michigan |
| | Kaiser Holman | 4 | 1980 | Kent State |
| | George Swarn | 4 | 1985 | Eastern Michigan |
| | Ty King | 4 | 1996 | Kent State |
| | Travis Prentice | 4 | 1997 | Northern Illinois |
| | Travis Prentice | 4 | 1997 | Marshall |
| | Travis Prentice | 4 | 1998 | Kent State |
| | Travis Prentice | 4 | 1998 | Ohio |
| | Cal Murray | 4 | 2000 | Kent State |

== Receiving ==
=== Receptions ===
Career
| Rk | Player | Rec | Years |
|---|---|---|---|
| 1 | Ryne Robinson | 258 | 2003 2004 2005 2006 |
| 2 | Nick Harwell | 229 | 2010 2011 2012 |
| 3 | Armand Robinson | 210 | 2007 2008 2009 2010 |
| 4 | Martin Nance | 208 | 2002 2003 2004 2005 |
| 5 | Michael Larkin | 200 | 2001 2002 2003 2004 |
| 6 | Jack Sorenson | 191 | 2018 2019 2020 2021 |
| 7 | Andy Cruse | 160 | 2009 2010 2011 2012 |
| 8 | Jared Murphy | 158 | 2013 2014 2015 2016 2017 |
| 9 | Chris Givens | 157 | 2007 2008 2009 2010 |
| 10 | Jamal Rogers | 134 | 2007 2008 2009 2010 |

Single season
| Rk | Player | Rec | Year |
|---|---|---|---|
| 1 | Nick Harwell | 97 | 2011 |
| 2 | Armand Robinson | 94 | 2010 |
| 3 | Ryne Robinson | 91 | 2006 |
| 4 | Martin Nance | 90 | 2003 |
| 5 | Martin Nance | 81 | 2005 |
| 6 | Jack Sorenson | 76 | 2021 |
| 7 | Ryne Robinson | 75 | 2005 |
| 8 | Andy Cruse | 74 | 2012 |
| 9 | Nick Harwell | 68 | 2012 |
| 10 | Michael Larkin | 67 | 2003 |
| | Armand Robinson | 67 | 2009 |

Single game
| Rk | Player | Rec | Year | Opponent |
|---|---|---|---|---|
| 1 | Nick Harwell | 15 | 2011 | Temple |
| 2 | Brayden Coombs | 14 | 2009 | Buffalo |
| | Armand Robinson | 14 | 2010 | Northern Illinois |
| | Nick Harwell | 14 | 2011 | Ohio |
| | Nick Harwell | 14 | 2011 | Western Michigan |
| | Jack Sorenson | 14 | 2021 | Ohio |
| 7 | Andy Schillinger | 13 | 1987 | Toledo |
| | Chris Givens | 13 | 2011 | Western Michigan |
| 9 | Eddie Tillitz | 12 | 2001 | Hawai’i |
| | Nick Harwell | 12 | 2011 | Minnesota |
| | Andy Cruse | 12 | 2012 | Southern Illinois |

=== Receiving yards ===
Career
| Rk | Player | Yards | Years |
|---|---|---|---|
| 1 | Ryne Robinson | 3,697 | 2003 2004 2005 2006 |
| 2 | Nick Harwell | 3,166 | 2010 2011 2012 |
| 3 | Martin Nance | 3,131 | 2002 2003 2004 2005 |
| 4 | Jack Sorenson | 3,070 | 2018 2019 2020 2021 |
| 5 | Michael Larkin | 2,722 | 2001 2002 2003 2004 |
| 6 | Armand Robinson | 2,550 | 2007 2008 2009 2010 |
| 7 | Trevor Gaylor | 2,131 | 1996 1997 1998 1999 |
| 8 | Chris Givens | 2,121 | 2007 2008 2009 2010 2011 |
| 9 | Jared Murphy | 2,083 | 2013 2014 2015 2016 2017 |
| 10 | James Gardner | 1,906 | 2015 2016 2017 2018 |

Single season
| Rk | Player | Yards | Year |
|---|---|---|---|
| 1 | Martin Nance | 1,498 | 2003 |
| 2 | Nick Harwell | 1,425 | 2011 |
| 3 | Jack Sorenson | 1,406 | 2021 |
| 4 | Ryne Robinson | 1,178 | 2006 |
| 5 | Ryne Robinson | 1,119 | 2005 |
| 6 | Martin Nance | 1,107 | 2005 |
| 7 | Armand Robinson | 1,062 | 2010 |
| 8 | Trevor Gaylor | 1,028 | 1999 |
| 9 | Kam Perry | 976 | 2025 |
| 10 | Andy Schillinger | 955 | 1986 |

Single game
| Rk | Player | Yards | Year | Opponent |
|---|---|---|---|---|
| 1 | Jack Sorenson | 283 | 2021 | Ohio |
| 2 | Gage Larvadain | 273 | 2023 | Massachusetts |
| 3 | Nick Harwell | 229 | 2011 | Temple |
| 4 | Nick Harwell | 219 | 2010 | Ohio |
| 5 | Nick Harwell | 215 | 2012 | Central Michigan |
| 6 | Dawan Scott | 208 | 2012 | Akron |
| 7 | Jeremy Patterson | 198 | 1993 | Southwestern Louisiana |
| 8 | Nick Harwell | 186 | 2011 | Army |
| 9 | Sly Johnson | 184 | 1999 | Eastern Michigan |
| 10 | Tom Murphy | 181 | 1983 | Bowling Green |
| | Martin Nance | 181 | 2003 | Kent State |

=== Receiving touchdowns ===
Career
| Rk | Player | TDs | Years |
|---|---|---|---|
| 1 | Michael Larkin | 32 | 2001 2002 2003 2004 |
| 2 | Martin Nance | 26 | 2002 2003 2004 2005 |
| 3 | Nick Harwell | 23 | 2010 2011 2012 |
| 4 | Ryne Robinson | 22 | 2003 2004 2005 2006 |
| 5 | Trevor Gaylor | 20 | 1996 1997 1998 1999 |
| | Jack Sorenson | 20 | 2018 2019 2020 2021 |
| 7 | Jeremy Patterson | 18 | 1991 1992 1993 1994 |
| | Jason Branch | 18 | 1999 2000 2001 2002 |
| 9 | Jay Hall | 17 | 1995 1996 1997 1998 |
| | James Gardner | 17 | 2015 2016 2017 2018 |

Single season
| Rk | Player | TDs | Year |
|---|---|---|---|
| 1 | Martin Nance | 14 | 2005 |
| 2 | Andy Schillinger | 12 | 1986 |
| 3 | Trevor Gaylor | 11 | 1999 |
| | Michael Larkin | 11 | 2003 |
| | Martin Nance | 11 | 2003 |
| | James Gardner | 11 | 2017 |
| 7 | Jack Sorenson | 10 | 2021 |
| 8 | John Erisman | 9 | 1966 |
| | Nick Harwell | 9 | 2011 |
| | Mac Hippenhammer | 9 | 2022 |
| | Reggie Virgil | 9 | 2024 |

== Total offense ==
Total offense is the sum of passing and rushing statistics. It does not include receiving or returns.

=== Total offense yards ===
Career
| Rk | Player | Yards | Years |
|---|---|---|---|
| 1 | Zac Dysert | 12,678 | 2009 2010 2011 2012 |
| 2 | Brett Gabbert | 11,296 | 2019 2020 2021 2022 2023 2024 |
| 3 | Ben Roethlisberger | 11,075 | 2001 2002 2003 |
| 4 | Gus Ragland | 7,194 | 2015 2016 2017 2018 |
| 5 | Josh Betts | 7,089 | 2002 2003 2004 2005 |
| 6 | Mike Bath | 7,010 | 1997 1998 1999 2000 |
| 7 | Sam Ricketts | 6,331 | 1994 1995 1996 1997 |
| 8 | Travis Prentice | 5,596 | 1996 1997 1998 1999 |
| 9 | Daniel Raudabaugh | 5,304 | 2006 2007 2008 2009 |
| 10 | Larry Fortner | 4,588 | 1975 1976 1977 1978 |

Single season
| Rk | Player | Yards | Year |
|---|---|---|---|
| 1 | Ben Roethlisberger | 4,597 | 2003 |
| 2 | Zac Dysert | 3,748 | 2012 |
| 3 | Zac Dysert | 3,628 | 2011 |
| 4 | Andrew Hendrix | 3,604 | 2014 |
| 5 | Josh Betts | 3,581 | 2004 |
| 6 | Ben Roethlisberger | 3,294 | 2001 |
| 7 | Ben Roethlisberger | 3,184 | 2002 |
| 8 | Josh Betts | 3,117 | 2005 |
| 9 | Brett Gabbert | 2,927 | 2024 |
| 10 | Zac Dysert | 2,869 | 2009 |

Single game
| Rk | Player | Yards | Year | Opponent |
|---|---|---|---|---|
| 1 | Zac Dysert | 624 | 2012 | Akron |
| 2 | Andrew Hendrix | 528 | 2014 | Massachusetts |
| 3 | Brett Gabbert | 515 | 2021 | Ohio |
| 4 | Ben Roethlisberger | 485 | 2002 | Northern Illinois |
| 5 | Ben Roethlisberger | 484 | 2001 | Hawaii |
| 6 | Ben Roethlisberger | 458 | 2001 | Akron |
| 7 | Zac Dysert | 455 | 2012 | Kent State |
| 8 | Ben Roethlisberger | 450 | 2003 | Kent State |
| 9 | Ben Roethlisberger | 448 | 2003 | Bowling Green |
| | Josh Betts | 448 | 2004 | Cincinnati |

=== Total touchdowns ===
Career
| Rk | Player | TDs | Years |
|---|---|---|---|
| 1 | Ben Roethlisberger | 91 | 2001 2002 2003 |
| 2 | Brett Gabbert | 88 | 2019 2020 2021 2022 2023 2024 |
| 3 | Zac Dysert | 85 | 2009 2010 2011 2012 |
| 4 | Travis Prentice | 73 | 1996 1997 1998 1999 |
| 5 | Gus Ragland | 70 | 2015 2016 2017 2018 |
| 6 | Josh Betts | 60 | 2002 2003 2004 2005 |
| 7 | Mike Bath | 56 | 1997 1998 1999 2000 |
| 8 | Sam Ricketts | 47 | 1994 1995 1996 1997 |
| 9 | Larry Fortner | 45 | 1975 1976 1977 1978 |

Single season
| Rk | Player | TDs | Year |
|---|---|---|---|
| 1 | Ben Roethlisberger | 40 | 2003 |
| 2 | Andrew Hendrix | 29 | 2014 |
| 3 | Ben Roethlisberger | 28 | 2001 |
| | Josh Betts | 28 | 2005 |
| 5 | Zac Dysert | 27 | 2011 |
| | Zac Dysert | 27 | 2012 |
| | Brett Gabbert | 27 | 2021 |
| 8 | Josh Betts | 26 | 2004 |
| 9 | Travis Prentice | 25 | 1997 |
| 10 | Mike Bath | 24 | 1999 |

== Defense ==
=== Interceptions ===
Career
| Rk | Player | Ints | Years |
|---|---|---|---|
| 1 | Ron Carpenter | 16 | 1990 1991 1992 |
| 2 | David Thomas | 15 | 1991 1992 1993 1994 |
| 3 | Dick Boron | 14 | 1966 1967 1968 |
| | Dick Adams | 14 | 1969 1970 |
| | Dave Williams | 14 | 1980 1981 1982 |
| 6 | Dayonne Nunley | 13 | 2010 2011 2012 2013 |
| 7 | Troy White | 12 | 1984 1985 1986 |
| 8 | Dan Rebsch | 12 | 1971 1972 1973 |

Single season
| Rk | Player | Ints | Year |
|---|---|---|---|
| 1 | Dick Adams | 7 | 1969 |
| | Dick Adams | 7 | 1970 |
| | Denny Costello | 7 | 1972 |
| | Joe Spicer | 7 | 1973 |
| | Ron Carpenter | 7 | 1990 |
| | Ron Carpenter | 7 | 1991 |
| | Quinten Rollins | 7 | 2014 |

=== Tackles ===
Career
| Rk | Player | Tackles | Years |
|---|---|---|---|
| 1 | Curt McMillan | 575 | 1989 1990 1991 1992 |
| 2 | Mark Hatgas | 526 | 1975 1976 1977 1978 |
| 3 | Johnnie Williams | 524 | 1992 1993 1994 1995 |
| 4 | Matt Salopek | 517 | 2019 2020 2021 2022 2023 2024 |
| 5 | Brad Cousino | 515 | 1972 1973 1974 |
| 6 | Kent McCormick | 488 | 1977 1978 1979 1980 |
| 7 | Matt Pusateri | 485 | 2001 2002 2003 2004 |
| 8 | Tim Colleran | 464 | 1982 1983 1984 |
| 9 | Dustin Cohen | 451 | 1996 1997 1998 1999 |
| 10 | Terrell Jones | 424 | 2000 2001 2002 2003 |

Single season
| Rk | Player | Tackles | Year |
|---|---|---|---|
| 1 | Marc Smith | 223 | 1970 |
| 2 | Mike Monos | 210 | 1973 |
| 3 | Curt McMillan | 204 | 1991 |
| 4 | Brad Cousino | 195 | 1974 |
| 5 | Joe Farais | 189 | 1978 |
| 6 | Brad Cousino | 187 | 1973 |
| 7 | Jack Glowik | 185 | 1977 |
| 8 | Mark Hatgas | 182 | 1975 |
| | Tim Colleran | 182 | 1984 |
| 10 | Marc Smith | 174 | 1971 |

Single game
| Rk | Player | Tackles | Year | Opponent |
|---|---|---|---|---|
| 1 | Doug Krause | 30 | 1970 | Bowling Green |
| 2 | Curt McMillan | 29 | 1991 | Bowling Green |
| 3 | Kevin Carlin | 28 | 1982 | Central Michigan |
| 4 | Mark Hatgas | 26 | 1976 | Marshall |
| 5 | Joe Farais | 25 | 1978 | Western Michigan |
| | Curt McMillan | 25 | 1990 | Toledo |
| 7 | Bob Williams | 24 | 1970 | Bowling Green |
| | Dave Hatgas | 24 | 1978 | Ball State |
| | Joe Farais | 24 | 1978 | Central Michigan |
| | Tim Colleran | 24 | 1984 | Ohio |

=== Sacks ===
Career
| Rk | Player | Sacks | Years |
|---|---|---|---|
| 1 | Jon Wauford | 35.0 | 1988 1989 1990 1991 |
| 2 | Andy Howard | 26.0 | 1988 1989 1990 1991 |
| 3 | JoJuan Armour | 24.5 | 1995 1996 1997 1998 |
| | J. T. Jones | 24.5 | 2013 2014 2015 2016 |
| 5 | Brian Ugwu | 20.5 | 2022 2023 2024 |
| 6 | Dustin Cohen | 20.0 | 1996 1997 1998 1999 |
| 7 | Phil Smith | 19.5 | 2000 2001 2002 2003 |
| | Joe Coniglio | 19.5 | 2005 2006 2007 2008 |
| 9 | Mel Edwards | 19.0 | 1972 1973 1974 1975 |
| 10 | Dave Brown | 18.0 | 1982 1983 1984 1985 1986 |

Single season
| Rk | Player | Sacks | Year |
|---|---|---|---|
| 1 | Jon Wauford | 14.0 | 1990 |
| 2 | Dave Brown | 13.0 | 1986 |
| | Curt McMillan | 13.0 | 1992 |
| 4 | Scott Frazier | 10.0 | 1990 |
| | Andy Howard | 10.0 | 1991 |
| | Matt Edwards | 10.0 | 2002 |
| | J. T. Jones | 10.0 | 2015 |

Single game
| Rk | Player | Sacks | Year | Opponent |
|---|---|---|---|---|
| 1 | J. T. Jones | 4.0 | 2015 | Eastern Michigan |

== Kicking ==
=== Field goals made ===
Career
| Rk | Player | FGs | Years |
|---|---|---|---|
| 1 | Gary Gussman | 68 | 1984 1985 1986 1987 |
| 2 | Graham Nicholson | 60 | 2021 2022 2023 |
| 3 | Trevor Cook | 57 | 2006 2007 2009 2010 |
| 4 | Sam Sloman | 49 | 2016 2017 2018 2019 |
| 5 | Chad Seitz | 47 | 1992 1993 1994 1995 |
| 6 | Dom Dzioban | 46 | 2021 2022 2023 2024 2025 |
| 7 | Kaleb Patterson | 39 | 2012 2013 2014 2015 |
| 8 | Jared Parseghian | 36 | 2001 2002 2003 2004 |
| 9 | Nathan Parseghian | 35 | 2005 2006 2007 2008 |
| 10 | Mike Kiebach | 31 | 1981 1982 1983 |

Single season
| Rk | Player | FGs | Year |
|---|---|---|---|
| 1 | Graham Nicholson | 27 | 2023 |
| 2 | Sam Sloman | 26 | 2019 |
| | Dom Dzioban | 26 | 2024 |
| 4 | Gary Gussman | 20 | 1987 |
| | Nathan Parseghian | 20 | 2008 |
| | Dom Dzioban | 20 | 2025 |
| 7 | Todd Soderquist | 19 | 2005 |
| 8 | Gary Gussman | 18 | 1985 |
| | Graham Nicholson | 18 | 2022 |
| 10 | Trevor Cook | 16 | 2010 |

Single game
| Rk | Player | FGs | Year | Opponent |
|---|---|---|---|---|
| 1 | Gary Gussman | 5 | 1987 | Central Michigan |
| | Nathan Parseghian | 5 | 2007 | Ohio |
| | Dom Dzioban | 5 | 2024 | Central Michigan |
| 4 | Mike Kiebach | 4 | 1983 | Central Michigan |
| | Gary Gussman | 4 | 1985 | Northern Illinois |
| | Gary Gussman | 4 | 1985 | Toledo |
| | Nathan Parseghian | 4 | 2008 | Ohio |
| | Trevor Cook | 4 | 2010 | Florida |
| | Trevor Cook | 4 | 2010 | Akron |
| | Graham Nicholson | 4 | 2021 | Eastern Michigan |
| | Graham Nicholson | 4 | 2021 | Kent State |
| | Dom Dzioban | 4 | 2025 | Western Michigan |
| | Kellan McLaughlin | 4 | 2026 | Bowling Green |

=== Field goal percentage ===
Career
| Rk | Player | FG% | Years |
|---|---|---|---|
| 1 | Dom Dzioban | 86.8% | 2021 2022 2023 2024 2025 |
| 2 | Graham Nicholson | 84.5% | 2021 2022 2023 |
| 3 | Jared Parseghian | 80.0% | 2001 2002 2003 2004 |
| 4 | Sam Sloman | 79.0% | 2016 2017 2018 2019 |
| 5 | Nick Dowd | 78.6% | 2015 2016 |
| 6 | John Scott | 74.4% | 1996 1997 1998 |
| 7 | Kaleb Patterson | 73.6% | 2012 2013 2014 2015 |
| 8 | Gary Gussman | 72.3% | 1984 1985 1986 1987 |
| 9 | Nathan Parseghian | 71.4% | 2005 2006 2007 2008 |
| 10 | Todd Soderquist | 70.7% | 2002 2003 2004 2005 |

Single season
| Rk | Player | FG% | Year |
|---|---|---|---|
| 1 | Graham Nicholson | 96.4% | 2023 |
| 2 | Nathan Parseghian | 87.0% | 2008 |
| | Dom Dzioban | 87.0% | 2025 |
| 4 | Sam Sloman | 86.7% | 2019 |
| | Dom Dzioban | 86.7% | 2024 |
| 6 | Kaleb Patterson | 83.3% | 2012 |
| 7 | Gary Gussman | 80.0% | 1987 |
| 8 | Gary Gussman | 78.9% | 1986 |
| 9 | Graham Nicholson | 78.3% | 2022 |
| 10 | Chad Seitz | 77.8% | 1992 |
