= List of Miami RedHawks in the NFL draft =

This is a list of Miami RedHawks football players in the NFL draft.

== Key ==
B	Back	K	Kicker	NT	Nose tackle
C	Center	LB	Linebacker	FB	Fullback
DB	Defensive back	P	Punter	HB	Halfback
DE	Defensive end	QB	Quarterback	WR	Wide receiver
DT	Defensive tackle	RB	Running back	G	Guard
E	End	T	Offensive tackle	TE	Tight end

== Selections ==
Year	Round	Pick	Player	Team	Position
1945	30	316	Jim Dougherty	Philadelphia Eagles	B
1946	14	121	Bob Russell	Chicago Cardinals	B
1946	17	151	Bob Loubie	Chicago Cardinals	B
1946	21	191	Al Traught	Chicago Cardinals	B
1947	13	109	Ara Parseghian	Pittsburgh Steelers	B
1948	25	235	Paul Shoults	Chicago Cardinals	B
1948	26	252	Paul Dietzel	Chicago Bears	C
1950	7	92	Mel Olix	Philadelphia Eagles	B
1950	24	308	John Weaver	Pittsburgh Steelers	G
1952	19	220	John Pont	Green Bay Packers	B
1952	23	277	Don Greene	Los Angeles Rams	T
1953	11	132	Jim Bailey	Los Angeles Rams	B
1953	16	186	John Zachary	Pittsburgh Steelers	B
1953	23	268	Jim Root	Chicago Cardinals	B
1954	9	108	Tom Jones	Cleveland Browns	T
1954	10	120	Tom Pagna	Cleveland Browns	B
1954	19	221	Charley Wenzlau	Baltimore Colts	E
1955	9	104	Bill Evans	Baltimore Colts	G
1955	12	136	Dick Chorovich	Baltimore Colts	T
1955	17	198	Ed Merchant	Pittsburgh Steelers	B
1956	6	65	Tirrel Burton	Philadelphia Eagles	B
1956	17	201	Tom Mooney	New York Giants	T
1956	27	324	Roger Siesel	Los Angeles Rams	T
1957	11	123	Don Smith	Los Angeles Rams	T
1957	14	159	Rudy Schoendorf	Green Bay Packers	T
1957	25	294	Tom Dimitroff	Cleveland Browns	B
1957	26	305	Allen Bliss	Cleveland Browns	E
1958	13	156	Hal Williams	Cleveland Browns	B
1958	27	324	Dave Thelen	Cleveland Browns	B
1959	18	215	Ed Hill	Cleveland Browns	G
1959	19	227	George Scott	New York Giants	B
1960	17	198	Dale Chamberlain	Pittsburgh Steelers	RB
1962	6	72	Bill Triplett	New York Giants	B
1962	11	149	Scott Tyler	Baltimore Colts	B
1963	2	15	Tom Nomina	Los Angeles Rams	T
1963	2	25	Bob Jencks	Chicago Bears	E
1963	13	173	Paul Watters	Baltimore Colts	T
1963	16	221	Lowell Caylor	Chicago Bears	DB
1963	17	235	Tim Stein	Pittsburgh Steelers	C
1965	12	159	Ernie Kellermann	Dallas Cowboys	QB
1967	4	101	Ed Philpott	Boston Patriots	DE
1967	7	168	Bruce Matte	Washington Redskins	QB
1967	13	330	John Erisman	Los Angeles Rams	WR
1968	16	430	Bob Smith	Houston Oilers	DB
1969	1	18	Bob Babich	San Diego Chargers	LB
1969	15	373	Errol Kahoun	Denver Broncos	G
1970	5	124	Gary Arthur	New York Jets	TE
1970	10	254	Cleve Dickerson	New York Jets	RB
1971	14	343	Dick Adams	Houston Oilers	DB
1973	13	338	Joe Booker	Miami Dolphins	RB
1975	7	162	Mike Biehle	Houston Oilers	T
1976	2	58	Sherman Smith	Seattle Seahawks	RB
1976	7	192	Carmen Rome	Cincinnati Bengals	DB
1976	13	371	Randy Walker	Cincinnati Bengals	RB
1977	3	71	Mike Watson	Miami Dolphins	T
1977	3	84	Rob Carpenter	Houston Oilers	RB
1979	12	327	Larry Fortner	Miami Dolphins	QB
1980	10	271	Doug Lantz	Miami Dolphins	C
1987	5	118	George Swarn	St. Louis Cardinals	RB
1988	3	62	Sheldon White	New York Giants	DB
1988	10	260	Andy Schillinger	Phoenix Cardinals	WR
1998	7	222	Damian Vaughn	Cincinnati Bengals	TE
1999	5	155	Paris Johnson	Arizona Cardinals	DB
1999	7	224	JoJuan Armour	Oakland Raiders	LB
2000	3	63	Travis Prentice	Cleveland Browns	RB
2000	4	111	Trevor Gaylor	San Diego Chargers	WR
2001	6	176	Alex Sulfsted	Kansas City Chiefs	G
2004	1	11	Ben Roethlisberger	Pittsburgh Steelers	QB
2004	5	138	Jacob Bell	Tennessee Titans	G
2005	5	147	Alphonso Hodge	Kansas City Chiefs	CB
2009	7	237	Jake O'Connell	Kansas City Chiefs	WR
2012	3	76	Brandon Brooks	Houston Texans	G
2013	7	234	Zac Dysert	Denver Broncos	QB
2015	2	62	Quinten Rollins	Green Bay Packers	DB
2020	7	249	Sam Sloman	Los Angeles Rams	K
2021	5	161	Tommy Doyle	Buffalo Bills	T
2022	5	174	Dominique Robinson	Chicago Bears	DE
2026	7	227	Jackson Kuwatch	Carolina Panthers	LB

== See also ==
- List of Miami University people
