= List of Miami RedHawks starting quarterbacks =

List of Miami University starting QBs

The Miami RedHawks are an NCAA Division 1 collegiate American football team at Miami University in Oxford, Ohio. They compete in the Mid-American Conference (MAC).

== Starters per season ==
These quarterbacks have started at least one game for the Miami RedHawks football team from the years 2000–2025.

The number of games they started during the season is listed to the right of their name:

Season	Starting quarterback(s)	References
2000	Mike Bath (11)	
2001	Ben Roethlisberger (12)	
2002	Ben Roethlisberger (12)	
2003	Ben Roethlisberger (14)	
2004	Josh Betts (13)	
2005	Josh Betts (11)	
2006	Mike Kokal (11) / Daniel Radabaugh (1)	
2007	Daniel Radabaugh (11) / Mike Kokal (2)	
2008	Daniel Radabaugh (11) / Clay Belton (1)	
2009	Zac Dysert (11) / Daniel Radabaugh (1)	
2010	Zac Dysert (11) / Austin Boucher (3)	
2011	Zac Dysert (12)	
2012	Zac Dysert (12)	
2013	Austin Boucher (8) / Drew Kummer (2) Austin Gearing (2)	
2014	Andrew Hendrix (12)	
2015	Drew Kummer (5) / Billy Bahl (7)	
2016	Billy Bahl (5) / Noah Wezensky (1) / Gus Ragland (7)	
2017	Gus Ragland (9) / Billy Bahl (3)	
2018	Gus Ragland (12)	
2019	Brett Gabbert (14)	
2020	Brett Gabbert (2) / AJ Mayer (1)	
2021	AJ Mayer (3) / Brett Gabbert (10)	
2022	Brett Gabbert (4) / Aveon Smith (9)	
2023	Brett Gabbert (8) / Aveon Smith (6) / Henry Hesson (1)	
2024	Brett Gabbert (14)	
2025	Dequan Finn (8) / Henry Hesson (3) / Thomas Gotkowski (3)	

== Team career passing records ==
Name	Completions	Attempts	Completion %	Yards	Touchdowns	Interceptions	Rating
Zac Dysert	1,066	1,672	63.8%	12,013	73	51	132.4
Ben Roethlisberger	854	1,304	65.5%	10,829	84	34	151.3
Josh Betts	541	929	58.2	7,029	54	30	134.5
Brett Gabbert	474	808	58.7	6,688	49	16	144.2
Mike Bath	444	903	49.2	6,524	49	38	119.3
