= Miami RedHawks =

Intercollegiate sports teams of Miami University in Ohio

- University: Miami University
- NCAA: Division I (FBS)
- Conference: Mid-American (primary); MVC (men's swimming & diving); NCHC (ice hockey)
- Athletic director: David Sayler
- Location: Oxford, Ohio
- Football stadium: Yager Stadium
- Basketball arena: Millett Hall
- Baseball stadium: Stanley G. McKie Field at Joseph P. Hayden Jr. Park
- Other venues: Goggin Ice Center
- Nickname: RedHawks
- Colors: Red and white
- Mascot: Swoop
- Website: miamiredhawks.com
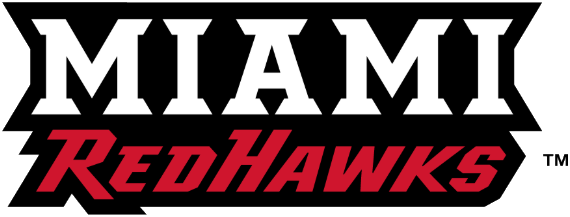

The Miami RedHawks are the National Collegiate Athletic Association (NCAA) Division I intercollegiate athletic teams that represent Miami University in Oxford, Ohio, United States. Miami is a member of the Mid-American Conference (MAC) and sponsors teams in nine men's and ten women's NCAA-sanctioned sports. The RedHawks hockey team is a member of the National Collegiate Hockey Conference, and the men's swimming and diving team competes in the Missouri Valley Conference. The football team competes in the Football Bowl Subdivision (FBS), the highest level of college football.

The RedHawks' main rivals are the Ohio Bobcats of Ohio University, whose rivalry is known as the Battle of the Bricks. The two universities are the oldest in the state. Miami also has a rivalry with the Cincinnati Bearcats of the University of Cincinnati; the two schools are located 25 miles (40 km) apart and compete in football for the Victory Bell. Having first been played in 1888, the rivalry is tied for being the oldest in the FBS.

In box scores, the Miami RedHawks are usually referred to as Miami (OH) to differentiate from the Miami Hurricanes, another Division I program affiliated with the University of Miami in Florida.

== Sports sponsored ==
| Men's sports | Women's sports |
|---|---|
| Baseball | Basketball |
| Basketball | Cross country |
| Cross country | Field hockey |
| Football | Soccer |
| Golf | Softball |
| Ice hockey | Swimming & diving |
| Swimming & diving | Synchronized skating |
| Track and field^{1} | Tennis |
| | Track and field^{1} |
| | Volleyball |
^{1} – includes both indoor and outdoor

=== Baseball ===
Beginning play in 1915, and Mid-American Conference (MAC) play in 1948, Miami has made the NCAA Division I Baseball Championship 7 times. The team has won 4 MAC conference championships, 3 MAC East Division titles (divisional play in the MAC was held from 1998 to 2017), and 3 MAC Tournament titles (the tournament began in 1981). The team plays its home games at McKie Field at Hayden Park in Oxford, Ohio.

=== Field hockey ===
The Miami field hockey team has won nine MAC tournament championships, most recently in 2024.

=== Football ===
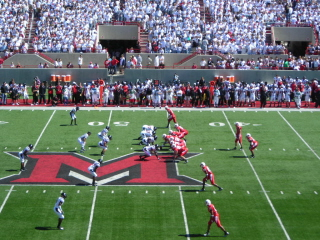
The RedHawks football team facing off against Cincinnati at Yager Stadium

The Miami University RedHawks football team is one with a rich tradition of history. The school boasts the longest continuous college football rivalry west of the Allegheny Mountains against the Cincinnati Bearcats, and has one of the oldest football programs in the country, dating to the year 1888.

=== Golf ===
The men's golf team has won 14 Mid-American Conference championships: 1948, 1950, 1970, 1974, 1981, 1987, 1988, 1989, 1990, 1991, 1992 (co-champions), 1996, 2015, and 2026. RedHawks who have had success at the professional level include: Bob Lohr (one PGA Tour win) and Brad Adamonis (one Nationwide Tour win).

=== Ice hockey ===
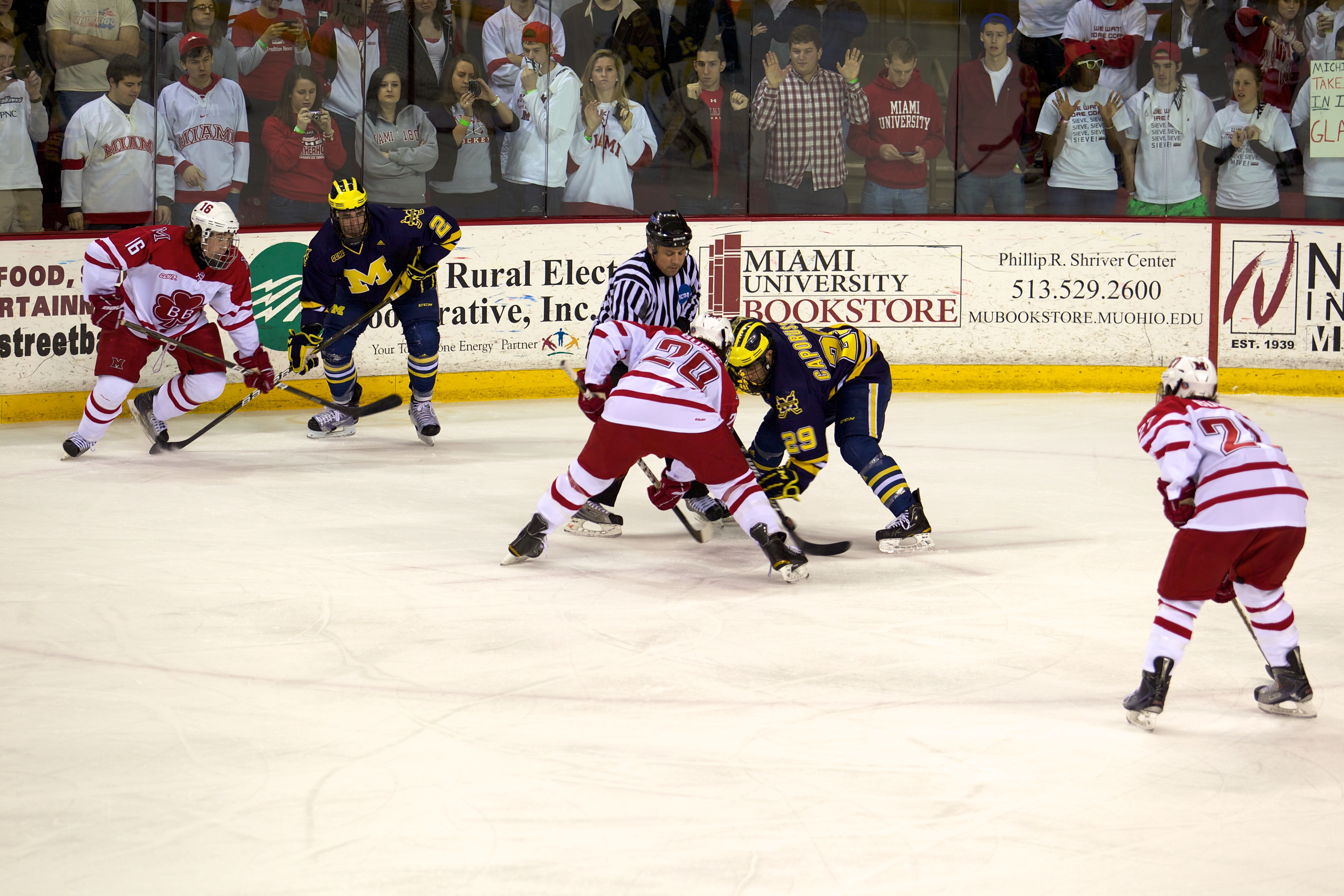
Miami men's ice hockey playing against Michigan at Goggin Ice Center

The RedHawks on ice played in the Central Collegiate Hockey Association ("CCHA") before the original conference disbanded in 2013, (Note: The CCHA was revived in 2020 and resumed play in the 2021–22 season.) and fielded one of the best teams in the league in its last years. In 2006, the RedHawks earned the first #1 national ranking in school history and were CCHA regular season champs. They made it to the championship game, but lost to Michigan State. The RedHawks have played in the National Collegiate Hockey Conference since that league began play in 2013–14.

Instead of playing in the Mid-American Conference ("MAC"), the mid-major conference most Miami varsity sports play in, the RedHawks competed against the larger schools of the CCHA such as the Michigan Wolverines and the Michigan State Spartans, who normally compete in the Big Ten.

In 2006 Miami University replaced the old Goggin Ice Arena from 1976 with the new $34.8-million state-of-the-art Goggin Ice Center, with a capacity of around 4,000. Both buildings are named for former University vice-president Lloyd Goggin.

In 2008 the RedHawks set team records for winning percentage and wins with .797 and 33 respectively. That year the RedHawks captured their first #1 seed in school history and advanced to the quarterfinals in the NCAA tournament, losing to Boston College. The team was led that year by All-Americans Ryan Jones and Alec Martinez.

The 2009 RedHawks became the first Miami team to reach the Frozen Four in the history of the program. The team made it to the championship game and carried a 3–1 lead into the final minute before giving up 2 goals 6 on 5 with the opposition net empty, and ultimately lost in overtime on an unlucky deflection, 4–3 to college hockey powerhouse Boston University.

=== Synchronized skating ===
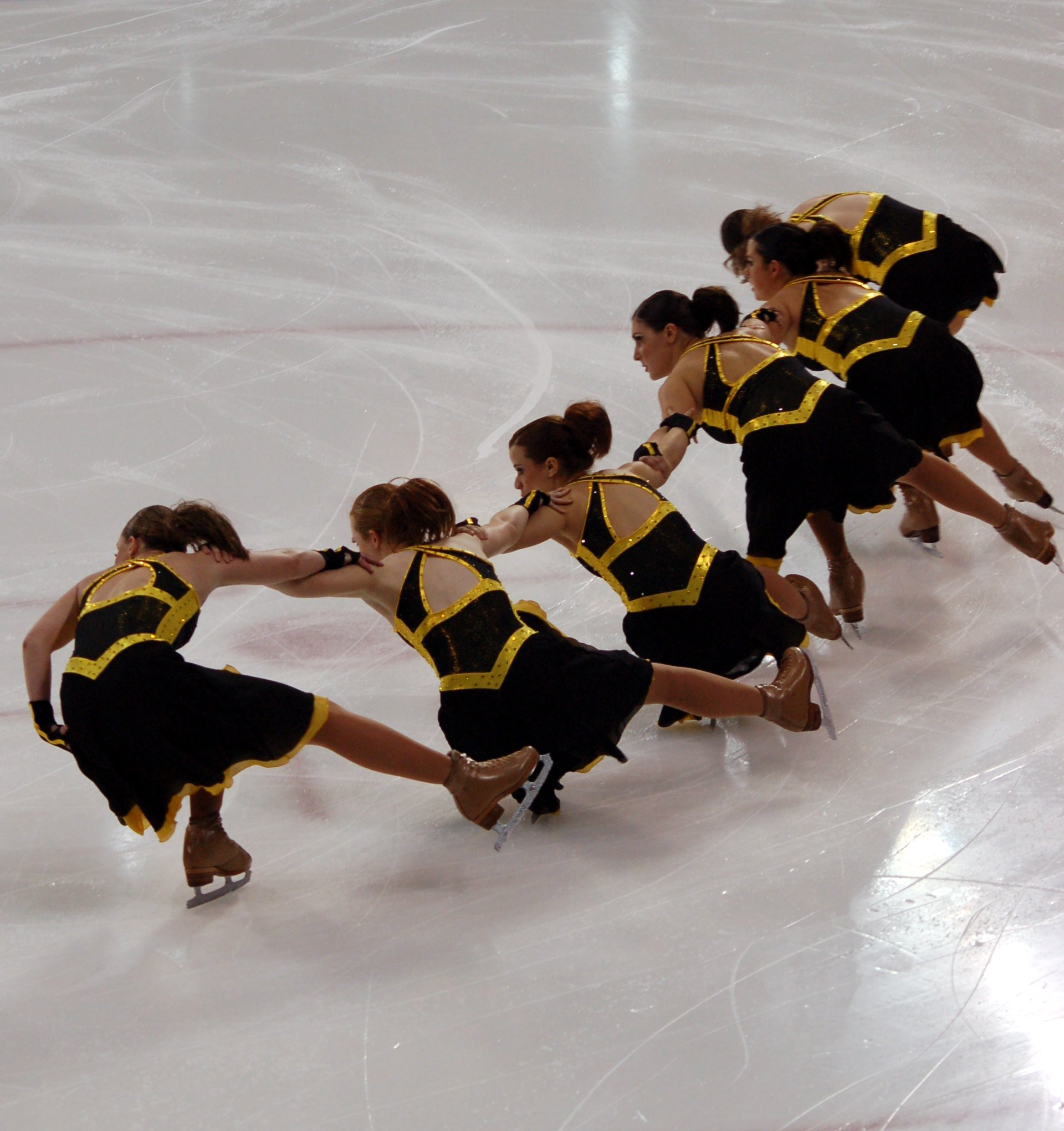
The Miami team performing shoot-the-ducks during the 2007 Colonial Classic

Miami's synchronized skating team began in August 1977 as a "Precision Skating Club" at Goggin Ice Center. The program achieved varsity status by 1996, and is also home to one of the first varsity synchronized skating teams in the country.

They are the 1999, 2006, and 2009 U.S. national champions. Miami won a silver medal at the 2007 International Skating Union World Synchronized Skating Championships. This is the highest finish for any US skating team and the first medal ever won by Team USA for synchronized skating.

Miami created a junior-varsity level team beneath the senior level. After serving as the coach of Miami's program for 25 years, Vicki Korn announced her retirement in May 2009.

(Note: Synchronized skating is sanctioned by U.S. Figure Skating, not by the NCAA. Most synchronized skating teams are clubs not affiliated with any college or university; Miami is one of about 15 schools that sponsor varsity or club teams.)

=== Tennis ===
Dave Abelson played tennis for the school, and later represented Canada in the Pan American Games and the Maccabiah Games.

== Club sports ==
=== Boxing ===
The Miami University boxing team competes in the Midwest Collegiate Boxing Association of the National Collegiate Boxing Association, a subset of USA Boxing dedicated to college boxing. The team competes from August to April each school year and has had regional and national medalists in the NCBA tournaments, as well as some boxers being named All-American. The current head coach is Coach Eric Buller, Pd.D, who works at Miami as the Director of the Harry T. Wilks Leadership Institute and arrived here in 2011. Prior to his arrival, he was the Assistant Coach of the Boxing team at the United States Military Academy and won a team Collegiate National Championship in 2008. He is a Level II USA Boxing Certified Coach and serves as the President for the National Collegiate Boxing Association. He is a two-time Miami Club Sports Coach/Advisor of the Year and was the 2016 NCBA National Coach of the Year. Coach Mike Argadine coached Miami Boxing for many years after his graduation from Miami. Coach Argadine, and his assistant coach Christopher Lee, stepped down after the 2011-2012 season as Head Coach.

=== Men's lacrosse ===
The men's lacrosse team represents Miami University and currently competes in non-varsity lacrosse in the Men's Collegiate Lacrosse Association (MCLA) Division I level as a member of the Great Rivers Lacrosse Conference (GRLC). The RedHawks lacrosse team plays home games in Yager Stadium located in Oxford, Ohio. The team is coach Chuck Wilson. Miami finished the 2010 season second place in the CCLA and won its first CCLA play off game in over ten years. Miami boasted a 9–4 record, including 5–0 at home.

=== Rugby ===
Founded in 1968, the Miami University Rugby Football Club plays college rugby in Division I in the MAC Conference. Miami reached the national playoffs in 2009 and again in 2010. Miami rugby was named the school's top performing and respected club among all of Miami's club sports in 2009 and in 2010. Miami rugby is supported by the Miami University Men's Rugby Football Club Alumni Association, which provides resources to the team. Miami rugby has been led since 2007 by Jared Moore.

=== Water ski ===
The men's and women's team compete in the National Collegiate Water Ski Association (NCWSA) in slalom, jump and trick events. They compete around the Midwest in the Great Lakes Region to qualify to the national competition. The Redhawks won the Division II National Championship 2016, 2017 and 2019.

=== Wrestling ===
At one time, Miami had a very competitive wrestling program. They won eight Mid-American Conference titles (1961, 1964, 1965, 1967, 1968, 1984, 1991 and 1992) and produced 51 NCAA qualifiers who earned 81 qualifications to the NCAA Division I tournament. Seven of their wrestlers earned All-American status, with HWT Mike Holcomb placing twice (5th in 1982, 3rd in 1984). The program was reinstalled as a club sport by Seth Preisler in 2002. In 2003, the club team took second in their regional tournament.

== Team name ==
Miami's athletic teams had several nicknames, including the Miami Boys, the Big Reds, and the Reds and Whites. In 1928, a Miami student referred to their team as the "Big Red-Skinned Warriors". Miami Publicity Director R.J. McGinnis coined the nickname Redskins and by 1931, the Redskins had become the official nickname of the Miami University athletics program.

In 1996, the Miami Tribe of Oklahoma, which works with the university on Native American relations, withdrew its support for the nickname. The board of trustees voted to change the nickname to the RedHawks in 1997. The athletics teams' new mascot, Swoop the RedHawk, was revealed during a men's basketball game against Xavier University on December 7, 1997.

== Cradle of Coaches ==
Miami University is most notable for having many quality coaches start their coaching career in some capacity at its school, and for others who went on to successful coaching careers after playing for Miami. The program's largest cohort are football coaches, including John Pont, Woody Hayes, Ara Parseghian, Bo Schembechler, Jim Tressel, and Terry Hoeppner. Former Miami players who never coached at the school but achieved notable coaching success in college or the NFL include Weeb Ewbank, John Harbaugh, and Sean McVay. Miami has also produced notable basketball coaches Darrell Hedric, Randy Ayers, Herb Sendek, Thad Matta and Sean Miller.

== Notable athletics alumni ==
- Kevyn Adams, Hockey
- Walter Alston, Baseball
- Jacob Bell, Football
- Dan Boyle, Hockey
- Brandon Brooks, Football
- Alain Chevrier, Hockey
- Charlie Coles, Basketball
- Adam Eaton, Baseball
- Wayne Embry, Basketball
- Andy Greene, Hockey
- John Harbaugh, football
- Ron Harper, Basketball
- Ryan Jones, Hockey
- Charlie Leibrandt, Baseball
- Alec Martinez, Hockey
- Sean McVay, football
- Tim Naehring, Baseball
- Martin Nance, Football
- Terna Nande, Football
- Ira Newble, Basketball
- Brian Pillman, Football
- Travis Prentice, Football
- Ryne Robinson, Football
- Ben Roethlisberger, Football
- Brian Savage, Hockey
- Milt Stegall, Football
- Wally Szczerbiak, Basketball
- Randy Walker, Football

== See also ==
- List of college athletic programs in Ohio
- Battle of the Bricks
