= Bob Hitchens =

American football player and coach (1952–2020)

No. 40
- Position: Running back

Personal information
- Born: January 30, 1952
- Died: July 7, 2020 (aged 68)

Career information
- College: Miami (OH) (1971–1973)

Awards and highlights
- Third-team All-American (1972); MAC Offensive Player of the Year (1972); Miami Redskins Athlete of the Year (1972); Miami RedHawks No. 40 retired; Miami University Hall of Fame

Robert Hitchens (January 30, 1952 – July 7, 2020) was an American college football player who was a running back for the Miami Redskins from 1971 to 1973. He was named a third-team All-American in 1972.

== College career ==
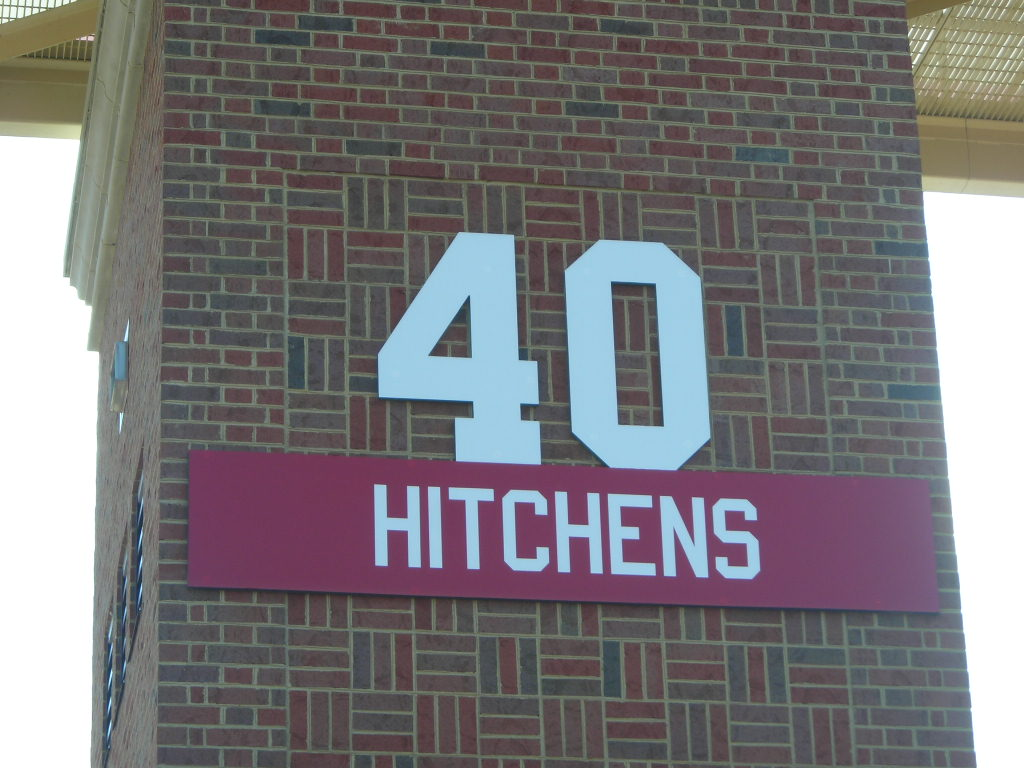
Bob Hitchens' number 40 displayed at Yager Stadium. He is one of three football players to have his jersey retired by the Miami RedHawks

Hitchens rushed for a career 3,118 yards with 34 touchdowns as a running back during his career and was a three-year letter winner for Miami.

In 1972 Hitchens rushed for 1,370 yards on 326 carries scoring 15 touchdowns earning third-team AP All-American honors, the MAC offensive player of the year and Miami Redskins athlete of the year. His 1,370 yards led the MAC and ranked second in the Division I-AA.

Hitchens helped lead Miami to an 11–0 season as a co-captain his senior year that included an MAC title and a Tangerine Bowl victory over the Florida Gators.

He holds the single game record for most rushes with 45 against the South Carolina Gamecocks in 1972, ranks fourth in career rushing attempts (773), fourth in rushing yards (3,118), third in rushing touchdowns (34), fourth in 100-yard games (14) and is sixth in total scoring (204 points).

Hitchens was inducted into the Miami University Hall of Fame in 1980.

== Professional career ==
Following graduation, Hitchens played professional football for two years with the New England Patriots, Kansas City Chiefs and Pittsburgh Steelers.

== Coaching career ==
Hitchens served as an assistant football coach and helped lead Carnegie-Mellon University to three President's Conference championships and two semi-final finishes in the NCAA District III playoffs. He joined Miami's staff as an assistant football coach from 1980 to 1987.
