= Armand Robinson =

American football player (born 1987)

Profile
- Position: Wide receiver

Personal information
- Born: December 8, 1987 (age 38)
- Listed height: 6 ft 1 in (1.85 m)
- Listed weight: 199 lb (90 kg)

Career information
- High school: Reynoldsburg (OH)
- College: Miami (OH)
- NFL draft: 2011: undrafted

Career history
- Pittsburgh Steelers (2011)*; Kansas City Command (2012)
- * Offseason or practice squad member only
- Stats at Pro Football Reference

Armand Robinson (born December 8, 1987) is an American former football wide receiver who played in the Arena Football League.

== Biography ==
Robinson played college football for the Miami RedHawks. In four seasons (2007–2010), he appeared in 50 games while recording 210 receptions for 2550 yards and 15 touchdowns.

Robinson signed a free agent contract with the Pittsburgh Steelers in 2011 as an undrafted rookie. In four preseason games, he had two receptions for 27 yards. He did not play in any regular season NFL games.

In 2012, Robinson played in the Arena Football League for the Kansas City Command. He recorded 47 receptions for 519 yards and nine touchdowns.

After his professional football career, Robinson went on to become a financial advisor.
