= Shane Montgomery =

American football player and coach (born 1967)

Current position
- Title: Offensive coordinator
- Team: Dartmouth
- Conference: Ivy League

Biographical details
- Born: March 14, 1967 (age 59); Newark, Ohio, U.S.

Playing career
- 1986–1989: NC State
- 1991: Raleigh–Durham Skyhawks
- Position: Quarterback

Coaching career (HC unless noted)
- 1991–1992: NC State (GA)
- 1993–1994: Chattanooga (QB)
- 1995: Chattanooga (co-OC/QB)
- 1996–2000: Chattanooga (WR)
- 2001–2004: Miami (OH) (OC/QB)
- 2005–2008: Miami (OH)
- 2009: Akron (OC/TE)
- 2010–2017: Youngstown State (OC/QB)
- 2018: Charlotte (OC/QB)
- 2019–2020: James Madison (OC/QB)
- 2021–2022: Buffalo (OC/QB)
- 2023: East Carolina (OA)
- 2024: UMass (OC/QB)
- 2024: UMass (interim HC)
- 2025–present: Dartmouth (OC)

Head coaching record
- Overall: 17–33

Accomplishments and honors

Championships
- 2 MAC East Division (2005, 2007)

Awards
- Second-team All-ACC (1989)

Shane M. Montgomery (born March 14, 1967) is an American college football coach and former player. He is the offensive coordinator for Dartmouth College, a position he has held since 2025. He was the head football coach for Miami University from 2005 to 2008 and the interim head football coach at the University of Massachusetts Amherst in 2024. He also coached for NC State, Chattanooga, Akron, Youngstown State, Charlotte, James Madison, Buffalo, and East Carolina. He played college football for NC State as a quarterback.

== Playing career ==
A Newark, Ohio native, Montgomery attended Newark Catholic High School where he helped the Green Wave to two state championships. Montgomery played quarterback at North Carolina State University in the late 1980s. He ended his career with 5,298 yards passing and 31 touchdowns. In 1989, he passed for 535 yards in a game against Duke, which still stands as NC State's single-game record. He was also named MVP of both the 1988 Peach Bowl and 1989 Copper Bowl.

== Coaching career ==
As an assistant, Montgomery coached several NFL players including Ben Roethlisberger and Terrell Owens. Montgomery's first job as an assistant coach was at University of Tennessee at Chattanooga from 1993 to 2000. He moved to Miami University in Oxford, Ohio as an offensive coordinator for Terry Hoeppner in 2001. Montgomery was a 2003 finalist for the Broyles Award, given annually to the nation's top college football assistant coach.

After spending four years as an assistant at Miami University, Montgomery became the RedHawks' 32nd head coach succeeding Hoeppner, who became head coach at Indiana University. In his first year the RedHawks posted a 7–4 record including a tie for first place in the MAC East division. University of Akron won the tie breaker and represented the East in the MAC Championship Game. On November 29, 2008, Montgomery resigned as Head Coach of the RedHawks, after four seasons and a 17–31 record.

On December 26, 2017, Montgomery was named the new offensive coordinator at Charlotte after spending the previous 8 years as the offensive coordinator at Youngstown State University.

On May 12, 2021, Montgomery was named the new offensive coordinator for the Buffalo Bulls. His first season saw the Bulls drop from the fifth-most points per game among 128 Football Bowl Subdivision (FBS) teams to 57th-most of 130 FBS teams. After the 2022 season it was announced that he was no longer with the Bull's football program.

In 2023, Montgomery was hired as an offensive analyst for East Carolina University under head coach Mike Houston.

On February 15, 2024, Montgomery was named the offensive coordinator and quarterbacks coach for the University of Massachusetts Amherst under head coach Don Brown. Brown was fired on November 18, 2024 and Montgomery was named interim head coach for the final two games of the season. UMass hired Joe Harasymiak as its permanent head coach on December 4. After one year with UMass, he was hired as the offensive coordinator for Dartmouth under head coach Sammy McCorkle. He took over for Kevin Daft.

== Head coaching record ==
Year	Team	Overall	Conference	Standing	Bowl/playoffs
Miami RedHawks (Mid-American Conference) (2005–2008)
2005	Miami	7–4	5–3	T–1st (East)	
2006	Miami	2–10	2–6	T–5th (East)	
2007	Miami	6–7	5–2	T–1st (East)	
2008	Miami	2–10	1–7	6th (East)	
Miami:		17–31	13–19		
UMass Minutemen (NCAA Division I FBS independent) (2024)
2024	UMass	0–2			
UMass:		0–2			
Total:		17–33			
National championship Conference title Conference division title or championship game berth
