= Brad Cousino =

American football player (born 1953)

No. 52, 57, 60
- Position: Linebacker

Personal information
- Born: April 5, 1953 (age 73); Toledo, Ohio, U.S.
- Listed height: 6 ft 0 in (1.83 m)
- Listed weight: 218 lb (99 kg)

Career information
- High school: Central Catholic (Toledo)
- College: Miami
- NFL draft: 1975: undrafted

Career history
- Cincinnati Bengals (1975); New York Giants (1976); Pittsburgh Steelers (1977)

Awards and highlights
- 2× MAC Defensive Player of the Year (1973, 1974); First-team All-American (1974)
- Stats at Pro Football Reference

Brad Cousino (born April 5, 1953) is an American former professional football player who was a linebacker in the National Football League (NFL). Cousino, an undersized nose tackle, played college football for the Miami RedHawks. There he played for Dick Crum. He was the defensive MVP, leading Miami to an 11–1 record in 1975. Miami finished the season ranked 12th in the AP Poll, after defeating the University of South Carolina in the Tangerine Bowl. He was the undrafted in 1975 but made the Cincinnati Bengals team. He played for the Cincinnati Bengals in 1975, the New York Giants in 1976 and for the Pittsburgh Steelers in 1977.
