= 2015 Miami RedHawks football team =

American college football season

2015 Miami RedHawks football
- Conference: Mid-American Conference
- East Division
- Record: 3–9 (2–6 MAC)
- Head coach: Chuck Martin (2nd season)
- Co-offensive coordinators: George Barnett (2nd season); Eric Koehler (2nd season)
- Offensive scheme: Multiple
- Defensive coordinator: Matt Pawlowski (2nd season)
- Base defense: 4–3
- Home stadium: Yager Stadium

2015 Mid-American Conference football standings
	Conf.			Overall
Team	W		L	W		L
East Division
Bowling Green x$	7	–	1	10	–	4
Ohio	5	–	3	8	–	5
Akron	5	–	3	8	–	5
Buffalo	3	–	5	5	–	7
Kent State	2	–	6	3	–	9
Miami (OH)	2	–	6	3	–	9
UMass	2	–	6	3	–	9
West Division
Northern Illinois xy	6	–	2	8	–	6
Western Michigan x	6	–	2	8	–	5
Toledo x	6	–	2	10	–	2
Central Michigan x	6	–	2	7	–	6
Ball State	2	–	6	3	–	9
Eastern Michigan	0	–	8	1	–	11
Championship: Bowling Green 34, Northern Illinois 14
$ – Conference champion; x – Division champion/co-champions; y – Championship game participant

The 2015 Miami RedHawks football team represented Miami University in the 2015 NCAA Division I FBS football season. They were led by second-year head coach Chuck Martin and played their home games at Yager Stadium and competed as a member of the East Division of the Mid-American Conference. They finished the season 3–9, 2–6 in MAC play to finish in a three way tie for fifth place in the East Division.

The 2015 Miami RedHawks football team represented Miami University in the 2015 NCAA Division I FBS football season. The RedHawks were led by second-year head coach Chuck Martin and played their home games at Yager Stadium in Oxford, Ohio, as members of the East Division of the Mid-American Conference (MAC). The team finished the season with an overall record of 3–9 and a conference record of 2–6, tying for fifth place in the MAC East Division.

During the season, Miami faced non-conference opponents including Presbyterian, Wisconsin, Cincinnati, and Western Kentucky. The RedHawks earned victories against Presbyterian, Eastern Michigan, and UMass. Despite the losing record, the season marked incremental progress under Martin’s rebuilding program following a 2–10 campaign in 2014.

== Schedule ==
Date	Time	Opponent	Site	TV	Result	Attendance
September 5	3:30 p.m.	Presbyterian*	Yager Stadium; Oxford, OH	ESPN3	W 26–7	14,397
September 12	12:00 p.m.	at Wisconsin*	Camp Randall Stadium; Madison, WI	ESPNU	L 0–58	76,535
September 19	3:30 p.m.	Cincinnati*^{†}	Yager Stadium; Oxford, OH (Victory Bell)	ESPN3	L 33–37	18,484
September 26	3:30 p.m.	at Western Kentucky*	Houchens Industries–L. T. Smith Stadium; Bowling Green, KY	CBSSN	L 14–56	20,320
October 3	3:30 p.m.	at Kent State	Dix Stadium; Kent, OH	ESPN3	L 14–20	10,991
October 10	2:00 p.m.	at Ohio	Peden Stadium; Athens, OH (Battle of the Bricks)	BCSN	L 3–34	25,086
October 17	2:30 p.m.	Northern Illinois	Yager Stadium; Oxford, OH	ESPN3	L 12–45	20,278
October 24	2:00 p.m.	at Western Michigan	Waldo Stadium; Kalamazoo, MI	ESPN3	L 13–35	18,523
October 29	7:30 p.m.	Buffalo	Yager Stadium; Oxford, OH	ESPN3	L 24–29	12,697
November 7	2:30 p.m.	Eastern Michigan	Yager Stadium; Oxford, OH	ESPN3	W 28–13	12,756
November 14	12:00 p.m.	Akron	Yager Stadium; Oxford, OH	ESPN3	L 28–37	15,629
November 21	1:00 p.m.	at UMass	Warren McGuirk Alumni Stadium; Hadley, MA	ESPN3	W 20–13	8,839
*Non-conference game; ^{†}Homecoming; All times are in Eastern time

== Game summaries ==
=== Presbyterian ===
	1	2	3	4	Total
Blue Hose	0	0	7	0	7
RedHawks	7	6	0	13	26

=== At Wisconsin ===
	1	2	3	4	Total
RedHawks	0	0	0	0	0
Badgers	13	24	14	7	58

=== Cincinnati ===
	1	2	3	4	Total
Bearcats	14	10	6	7	37
RedHawks	7	16	7	3	33

=== At Western Kentucky ===
	1	2	3	4	Total
RedHawks	0	7	0	7	14
Hilltoppers	21	28	0	7	56

=== At Kent State ===
	1	2	3	4	Total
RedHawks	0	0	0	14	14
Golden Flashes	6	7	7	0	20

=== At Ohio ===
	1	2	3	4	Total
RedHawks	0	3	0	0	3
Bobcats	7	10	10	7	34

=== Northern Illinois ===
	1	2	3	4	Total
Huskies	21	0	10	14	45
RedHawks	0	3	2	7	12

=== At Western Michigan ===
	1	2	3	4	Total
RedHawks	10	0	3	0	13
Broncos	7	14	7	7	35

=== Buffalo ===
	1	2	3	4	Total
Bulls	10	7	12	0	29
RedHawks	7	10	0	7	24

=== Eastern Michigan ===
	1	2	3	4	Total
Eagles	0	3	7	3	13
RedHawks	7	14	7	0	28

=== Akron ===
	1	2	3	4	Total
Zips	14	13	7	3	37
RedHawks	7	0	7	14	28

=== At Massachusetts ===
	1	2	3	4	Total
RedHawks	0	3	7	10	20
Minutemen	3	3	7	0	13
