= 2008 Miami RedHawks football team =

American college football season

2008 Miami RedHawks football
- Conference: Mid-American Conference
- East Division
- Record: 2–10 (1–7 MAC)
- Head coach: Shane Montgomery (4th season)
- Home stadium: Yager Stadium

2008 Mid-American Conference football standings
	Conf.			Overall
Team	W		L	W		L
East Division
Buffalo x$	5	–	3	8	–	6
Bowling Green	4	–	4	6	–	6
Temple	4	–	4	5	–	7
Ohio	3	–	5	4	–	8
Akron	3	–	5	5	–	7
Kent State	3	–	5	4	–	8
Miami (OH)	1	–	7	2	–	10
West Division
Ball State x	8	–	0	12	–	2
Central Michigan	6	–	2	8	–	5
Western Michigan	6	–	2	9	–	4
Northern Illinois	5	–	3	6	–	7
Toledo	2	–	6	3	–	9
Eastern Michigan	2	–	6	3	–	9
Championship: Buffalo 42, Ball State 24
$ – Conference champion; x – Division champion/co-champions

The 2008 Miami RedHawks football team represented Miami University in the 2008 NCAA Division I FBS football season. The team competed as a member of the East Division of the Mid-American Conference (MAC) and finished the season with a 2–10 record and a 1–7 record in conference games. The RedHawks were led by fourth-year head coach Shane Montgomery, who resigned after the season.

== Schedule ==
Date	Time	Opponent	Site	TV	Result	Attendance	Source
August 28	7:35 pm	Vanderbilt*	Yager Stadium; Oxford, OH	ESPNU	L 13–34	18,398	
September 6	12:00 pm	at Michigan*	Michigan Stadium; Ann Arbor, MI	ESPN2	L 6–16	106,724	
September 13	3:00 pm	Charleston Southern*	Yager Stadium; Oxford, OH		W 38–27	13,833	
September 20	7:30 pm	at Cincinnati*	Nippert Stadium; Cincinnati, OH (Victory Bell)	ESPN360	L 20–45	31,629	
October 4	3:36 pm	Temple	Yager Stadium; Oxford, OH		L 10–28	17,295	
October 11	3:00 pm	at Northern Illinois	Huskie Stadium; DeKalb, IL		L 13–17	17,444	
October 18	12:00 pm	at Bowling Green	Doyt Perry Stadium; Bowling Green, OH	ESPN Plus	W 27–20	15,411	
October 25	3:30 pm	Kent State^{†}	Yager Stadium; Oxford, OH		L 21–54	14,460	
November 4	7:36 pm	at Buffalo	University at Buffalo Stadium; Amherst, NY	ESPN2	L 17–37	16,058	
November 11	7:06 pm	No. 14 Ball State	Yager Stadium; Oxford, OH	ESPN2	L 16–31	14,758	
November 21	7:07 pm	at Toledo	Glass Bowl; Toledo, OH		L 14–42	12,251	
November 28	12:35 pm	Ohio	Yager Stadium; Oxford, OH (Battle of the Bricks)	ESPNU	L 26–41	13,867	
*Non-conference game; ^{†}Homecoming; Rankings from AP Poll released prior to the game; All times are in Eastern time
