= Dick Adams (Canadian football) =

American football player (born 1948)

Profile
- Position: Defensive back

Personal information
- Born: February 13, 1948 (age 78); Athens, Ohio, U.S.
- Listed height: 6 ft 0 in (1.83 m)
- Listed weight: 195 lb (88 kg)

Career information
- College: Miami (Ohio)
- NFL draft: 1971: 14th round, 343rd overall pick

Career history
- 1971: Houston Oilers*
- 1972–1976: Ottawa Rough Riders
- * Offseason or practice squad member only

Awards and highlights
- 2× Grey Cup champion (1973, 1976); Second-team All-American (1970)

Richard Adams (born February 13, 1948), known as Dick or Dickie, is an American former professional football player who was a defensive back for the Ottawa Rough Riders of the Canadian Football League (CFL). He played college football for the Miami RedHawks. He was selected and tried out for the Houston Oilers of the National Football League (NFL). Adams was released at the end of the first week of the Oilers' 1971 training camp before the first preseason game.

After being signed by the Rough Riders, Adams played in 63 regular season games from 1972 to 1976. He was named an All-Canadian player from 1972 to 1975. Adams became a Grey Cup champion in 1973 after the Rough Riders defeated the Edmonton Eskimos 22–18 in the 61st Grey Cup. He also won another Grey Cup with Ottawa in 1976.

== College career ==
Dick Adams was a three-year letterwinner (1968–70) at Miami University. He was selected first-team all-MAC defensive back and kick returner in 1969 and 1970, where he also punted and occasionally lined up as a receiver on offense. He still owns a part of three school records for interceptions in a season (7 – twice) and punt returns in a game (12) and season (55) . In his college playing career he established 14 records and tied two others, including four Mid-American Conference marks. Adams set national records for punt returns (55) and total kick returns (70).

In both 1969 and 1970 Dick Adams won the Miami most valuable player award. In 1970 Adams had his best year at Miami. Adams was selected as a second-team All-American by the Associated Press. He also was named MAC Defensive Player of the Year. Adams and Jim Bengala were both named the team captains.

Dick Adams was elected to the Miami Athletic Hall of Fame in 2004.

== Coaching career ==
Adams began his coaching career in 1976 at Carleton University in Ottawa, Ontario, Canada. He went on to coach at four other colleges over the next 19 years. He made his professional coaching debut as an assistant coach and special teams coordinator in 1983 with the Calgary Stampede of the Canadian Football League.

The highlight of Adams CFL coaching career came in 1989 as an assistant coach with the Saskatchewan Roughriders. The Roughriders won the western conference and Grey Cup that season. He has also spent a number of years with Winnipeg and Ottawa in the CFL as well.

Adams served as head coach of Bethel College (93–95) and was an assistant at Murray State (92–93).

Adams made his indoor coaching debut in 1998 with the Madison Mad Dogs (PIFL). He led Madison to the championship game and was named PIFL Co-Coach of the Year that season. Adams was also an assistant coach for the Peoria Pirates (AF2) when the team won the championship in 2002 and also coached briefly with the New York Dragons (AFL) that year. In 2004 he was named head coach to the Tennessee Valley Pythons during their inaugural 2005 United Indoor Football season. In 2005 Adams agreed to become the next head coach of the La Crosse Night Train of the National Indoor Football League.
