= Josh Betts =

American football player (born 1982)

No. 9
- Position: Quarterback

Personal information
- Born: August 25, 1982 (age 44); Vandalia, Ohio, U.S.
- Listed height: 6 ft 2 in (1.88 m)
- Listed weight: 217 lb (98 kg)

Career information
- High school: Butler (Vandalia)
- College: Miami (OH)
- NFL draft: 2006: undrafted

Career history
- Indianapolis Colts (2006–2008)*; Hamilton Tiger-Cats (2009)*
- * Offseason or practice squad member only

Joshua Kane Betts (born August 25, 1982) is an American former football player. He played college football for the Miami RedHawks and was signed by the Indianapolis Colts of the National Football League (NFL) as an undrafted free agent in 2006.

== College career ==
Betts was the successor at Miami University to first-round pick Ben Roethlisberger of the Pittsburgh Steelers.

== Professional career ==
=== Indianapolis Colts ===
Betts signed with the Indianapolis Colts in May 2006 but was waived and put onto the practice squad for one year. He was signed again as a free agent to the Colts in February 2007.

Betts got to play in the 4th quarter in the first 2007 NFL preseason game against the Dallas Cowboys. He played in two drives in which he threw 9 for 14 for 77 yards with one touchdown and one interception.

In his second preseason game against the Chicago Bears, Josh Betts played again in the 4th quarter where he struggled in his initial few drives, throwing two interceptions while under pressure, with one of them being in the Chicago red zone. He was able to redeem himself with a touchdown in his last drive with a touchdown pass to Craphonso Thorpe.

In the last pre-season game against the Cincinnati Bengals, he threw 12 for 21 for 154 yards with one touchdown and one interception. The game ended with a loss to Indianapolis when Jonny Harline caught Betts' desperation pass at the 1-yard line and was tackled as time ran out.

On July 24, 2008, Betts was waived following the signings of Quinn Gray and Jared Lorenzen. He was re-signed to the Colts' practice squad on September 3 and was released again on September 18. He was re-signed on September 23 only to be released a day later when the team signed quarterback David Greene to their practice squad.
