= Andy Schillinger =

American football player (born 1964)

No. 87
- Position: Wide receiver

Personal information
- Born: November 22, 1964 (age 61); Lakewood, Ohio, U.S.
- Listed height: 5 ft 11 in (1.80 m)
- Listed weight: 179 lb (81 kg)

Career information
- High school: Avon Lake (OH)
- College: Miami (OH)
- NFL draft: 1988: 10th round, 260th overall pick

Career history
- Phoenix Cardinals (1988-1989); Minnesota Vikings (1990)*
- * Offseason or practice squad member only
- Stats at Pro Football Reference

Andy Schillinger (born November 22, 1964) is an American former professional football player who was a wide receiver for the Phoenix Cardinals of the National Football League (NFL) in 1988. He played college football for the Miami RedHawks and was selected by the Cardinals in the tenth round with the 260th overall pick in the 1988 NFL draft.
