= Ryne Robinson =

American football player (born 1984)

No. 10
- Position: Wide receiver

Personal information
- Born: November 4, 1984 (age 42); Toledo, Ohio, U.S.
- Listed height: 5 ft 9 in (1.75 m)
- Listed weight: 179 lb (81 kg)

Career information
- High school: Central Catholic (Toledo)
- College: Miami (OH)
- NFL draft: 2007: 4th round, 118th overall pick

Career history
- Carolina Panthers (2007–2009); Florida Tuskers (2010)*
- * Offseason or practice squad member only

Awards and highlights
- MAC Special Teams Player of the Year (2004); Second-team All-MAC (2005); First-team All-MAC (2006)

Career NFL statistics
- Receptions: 4
- Receiving yards: 35
- Return yards: 860
- Stats at Pro Football Reference

Ryne Robinson (born November 4, 1984) is an American former professional football player who was a wide receiver for the Carolina Panthers of the National Football League (NFL). He played college football for the Miami RedHawks and was selected by the Carolina Panthers in the fourth round of the 2007 NFL draft. Robinson was also a member of the Florida Tuskers of the United Football League (UFL).

== Early life ==
- Three-year letterwinner as a wider receiver and defensive back for Central Catholic High School (Toledo, Ohio)
- Three-time all-Toledo City League selection
- Two-time all-district honoree
- 2002 District Offensive Player of the Year
- Totaled 62 receptions for 1,035 yards and 16 touchdowns as a senior
- Averaged 25.3 yards per punt as a senior, returning two for touchdowns
- Also grabbed five interceptions as a senior
- Helped the Irish to a three-year record of 27-8

== College career ==
=== Baseball ===
Robinson was a left fielder for the RedHawks baseball team. He played in 157 games, and ended with a .284 batting average. He holds the school single-season records for triples (8) and stolen bases (34).

=== Football ===
Robinson played for the RedHawks' football team as a freshman, mostly on special teams. He finished his first year with a school record for most punt return yards in a season (674), and set a Mid-American Conference record for yards in a game, when he returned 274 yards against the University at Buffalo. In his junior year, he became only the third player in school history to top 1,000 receiving yards in a single season, which he duplicated his senior year. In four years, he amassed a total of 3,697 receiving yards on 258 catches, both school records. His 1,677 punt return yards are the third most in NCAA history.

== Professional career ==
=== Carolina Panthers ===
Robinson was taken in the fourth round (118th overall) of the 2007 NFL draft by the Carolina Panthers.

On October 8, 2008, Robinson was placed on season-ending injured reserve as the team signed wide receiver Kenneth Moore.

The Panthers waived Robinson on August 31, 2009.

=== Florida Tuskers ===
Robinson was signed by the Florida Tuskers of the United Football League on August 26, 2010. Robinson is the second cousin of JoJuan Armour.
