= Gary Gussman =

American football player and coach (born 1965)

Profile
- Position: Placekicker

Personal information
- Born: September 24, 1965 (age 61); Miami, Florida, U.S.
- Listed height: 5 ft 10 in (1.78 m)
- Listed weight: 180 lb (82 kg)

Career information
- College: Miami (OH)

Career history

Playing
- Denver Dynamite (1989); Albany Firebirds (1990–1992)

Coaching
- Connecticut Coyotes (1995) (STC); Houston Thunderbears (1998–2001) (STC); Orlando Predators (2002) (STC); Rio Grande Valley Dorados (2004) (HC); Las Vegas Gladiators (2005–2006) (STC); New Orleans VooDoo (2007–2008) (STC); Orlando Predators (2010–2011) (AHC / STC); Tampa Bay Storm (2017) (STC)

Operations
- Las Vegas Gladiators (2005–2006) (DFO); New Orleans VooDoo (2011–2013) (DFO / IGM)

Awards and highlights
- First-team All-Arena (1989); Second-team All-Arena (1990); Second-team All-American (1987)

Career AFL statistics
- FG made: 36
- FG att: 135
- PAT made: 91
- PAT att: 134
- Tackles: 7
- Stats at ArenaFan.com

Gary Gussman (born September 24, 1965) is an American former professional football placekicker and coach in the Arena Football League (AFL). He played four seasons in the AFL with the Denver Dynamite and Albany Firebirds. He played college football at Miami University.

== College career ==
Gussman played for the Miami RedHawks from 1984 to 1987. He was named All-MAC three consecutive seasons, including First Team and All-American honors as a senior in 1987.

== Professional career ==
Gussman played for the AFL's Denver Dynamite in 1989, earning first-team All-Arena honors. He played for the Albany Firebirds of the AFL from 1990 to 1992, earning second-team All-Arena honors in 1990.

== Coaching career ==
Gussman was the special teams coordinator of the AFL's Connecticut Coyotes in 1995. He was special teams coordinator of the Houston Thunderbears of the AFL from 1998 to 2001. He was special teams coordinator of the Orlando Predators of the AFL in 2002. Gussman was head coach of the Rio Grande Valley Dorados of the af2 in 2004. He was special teams coordinator and Director of Football Operations for the AFL's Las Vegas Gladiators from 2005 to 2006. He was special teams coordinator of the New Orleans VooDoo of the AFL from 2007 to 2008. Gussman was assistant head coach/special teams coordinator of the Orlando Predators of the AFL from 2010 to 2011. In March 2017, Gussman was named the special teams coach for the Tampa Bay Storm of the AFL.

== Administrative career ==
Gussman was named Director of Football Operations for the New Orleans VooDoo in September 2011. He was also named interim general manager of the VooDoo in August 2012. He resigned in March 2013.
