= George Swarn =

American football player (born 1964)

No. 38
- Position: Running back

Personal information
- Born: February 15, 1964 (age 62); Cincinnati, Ohio, U.S.
- Listed height: 5 ft 10 in (1.78 m)
- Listed weight: 205 lb (93 kg)

Career information
- High school: Malabar (Mansfield, Ohio)
- College: Miami (OH)
- NFL draft: 1987: 5th round, 118th overall pick

Career history
- St. Louis Cardinals (1987)*; Cleveland Browns (1987–1988); Miami Dolphins (1990)
- * Offseason or practice squad member only
- Stats at Pro Football Reference

George Washington Swarn III (born February 15, 1964) is an American former professional football running back who played for the Cleveland Browns of the National Football League (NFL). He was selected by the St. Louis Cardinals in the fifth round of the 1987 NFL draft. He played college football for the Miami Redskins.

== Early life and college ==
George Washington Swarn III was born on February 15, 1964 in Cincinnati, Ohio. He attended Malabar High School in Mansfield, Ohio.

He lettered for the Miami Redskins from 1983 to 1986. He rushed for 267 yards his freshman year in 1983. He rushing for 1,282 yards and five touchdowns while catching 20 passes for 187 yards and one touchdown in 1984. Swarn totaled 1,511 rushing yards for 12 touchdowns and 44 receptions for 424 yards and four touchdowns his junior year in 1985. He recorded 1,112 rushing yards for five touchdowns and 50 catches for 423 yards and two touchdowns as a senior in 1986. His rushing yard totals led the Mid-American Conference in both 1984 and 1985.

== Professional career ==
Pre-draft measurables
Height	Weight	Arm length	Hand span	40-yard dash	10-yard split	20-yard split	20-yard shuttle	Vertical jump	Broad jump	Bench press
5 ft 10 3/4 in (1.80 m)	205 lb (93 kg)	32 1/4 in (0.82 m)	8 1/2 in (0.22 m)	4.60 s	1.59 s	2.67 s	4.25 s	33.5 in (0.85 m)	10 ft 1 in (3.07 m)	16 reps
All values from NFL Combine

Swarn was selected by the St. Louis Cardinals in the fifth round, with the 118th overall pick, of the 1987 NFL draft. He officially signed with the team on July 24. He was released on September 7, 1987.

Swarn signed with the Cleveland Browns on October 15, 1987. He played in one game for the Browns during the 1987 season without recording any statistics, and was placed on injured reserve on December 25, 1987. He was placed on injured reserve again on August 29, 1988, and spent the entire 1988 season there. Swarn was released by the Browns on September 5, 1989.

He was signed by the Miami Dolphins on April 5, 1990. He was placed on season-ending injured reserve on August 8, 1990. He became a free agent in February 1991.
