= Martin Nance =

American football player (born 1983)

No. 15
- Position: Wide receiver

Personal information
- Born: May 26, 1983 (age 43); The city that in 1985 would become Maryland Heights, Missouri, U.S.
- Listed height: 6 ft 4 in (1.93 m)
- Listed weight: 213 lb (97 kg)

Career information
- College: Miami (Ohio)
- NFL draft: 2006: undrafted

Career history
- Buffalo Bills (2006)*; Minnesota Vikings (2006–2007); Pittsburgh Steelers (2008–2009)*
- * Offseason or practice squad member only

Awards and highlights
- Super Bowl champion (XLIII); First-team All-MAC (2005); Second-team All-MAC (2003)

Career NFL statistics
- Receptions: 4
- Receiving yards: 33
- Stats at Pro Football Reference

Martin Nance (born May 26, 1983) is an American marketing executive and entrepreneur who formerly played as a football wide receiver. A graduate of Miami University, the University of Michigan and Harvard Business School, he played college football at Miami University in Ohio, where he still holds numerous receiving records.

Nance was signed by the Buffalo Bills as an undrafted free agent in 2006. He was also a member of the Minnesota Vikings and the Pittsburgh Steelers. He earned a Super Bowl ring with the Steelers in Super Bowl XLIII.

On February 10, 2021, the Vikings announced they had hired Nance to be their chief marketing officer.

== Early life ==
Nance played high school football at Pattonville High School.

== College career ==
Nance attended Miami University in Oxford, Ohio, where he played alongside quarterback Ben Roethlisberger.

== Professional football career ==
Pre-draft measurables
Height	Weight	Arm length	Hand span	40-yard dash	10-yard split	20-yard split	20-yard shuttle	Three-cone drill	Vertical jump	Broad jump
6 ft 4 1/4 in (1.94 m)	213 lb (97 kg)	33 1/8 in (0.84 m)	10 3/8 in (0.26 m)	4.55 s	1.60 s	2.65 s	4.08 s	6.91 s	33.5 in (0.85 m)	9 ft 4 in (2.84 m)
All values from NFL Combine

=== Buffalo Bills ===
Following the 2006 NFL draft, Nance was signed as an undrafted free agent by the Buffalo Bills. He was waived on August 28.

=== Minnesota Vikings ===
Nance then signed with the Minnesota Vikings. During his rookie season, he only saw action in the final game against the St. Louis Rams on December 31, 2006, where he recorded 4 receptions for 33 yards. After the 2008 preseason, the Vikings released him.

=== Pittsburgh Steelers ===
The Pittsburgh Steelers signed Nance to their practice squad on September 10, 2008. Nance again played with his college quarterback, Roethlisberger. After finishing the season on their practice squad, he was re-signed on February 18, 2009. He was waived on August 31.

== Marketing career ==
Following his time in the NFL, Nance received a Master of Business Administration degree from the Ross School of Business at the University of Michigan and a certificate in executive education from Harvard University. He worked for the NFL in 2011 and then worked for PepsiCo's Gatorade division as the senior director of marketing and sports intelligence. In 2021, Nance was hired by the Vikings as chief marketing officer.

== Personal life ==
His cousin Todd Jenkins was a wide receiver at Northwestern from 1980 to 1983.
