= David Sayler =

American college athletics administrator

Current position
- Title: Athletic director
- Team: Miami (OH)
- Conference: MAC

Biographical details
- Born: September 6, 1969 (age 57); Greenwich, Connecticut, U.S.
- Education: Ohio Wesleyan ('91)

Administrative career (AD unless noted)
- 2009–2010: Rice (interim AD)
- 2010–2012: South Dakota
- 2012–present: Miami (OH)

David Sayler is the current director of athletics for Miami University. He previously served as athletic director at the University of South Dakota from 2010 to 2012 and interim athletic director at Rice University from 2009 to 2010.

In 2023, he was named to serve a three-year term on the Selection Committee for the College Football Playoff.
