= JoJuan Armour =

American gridiron football player (born 1976)

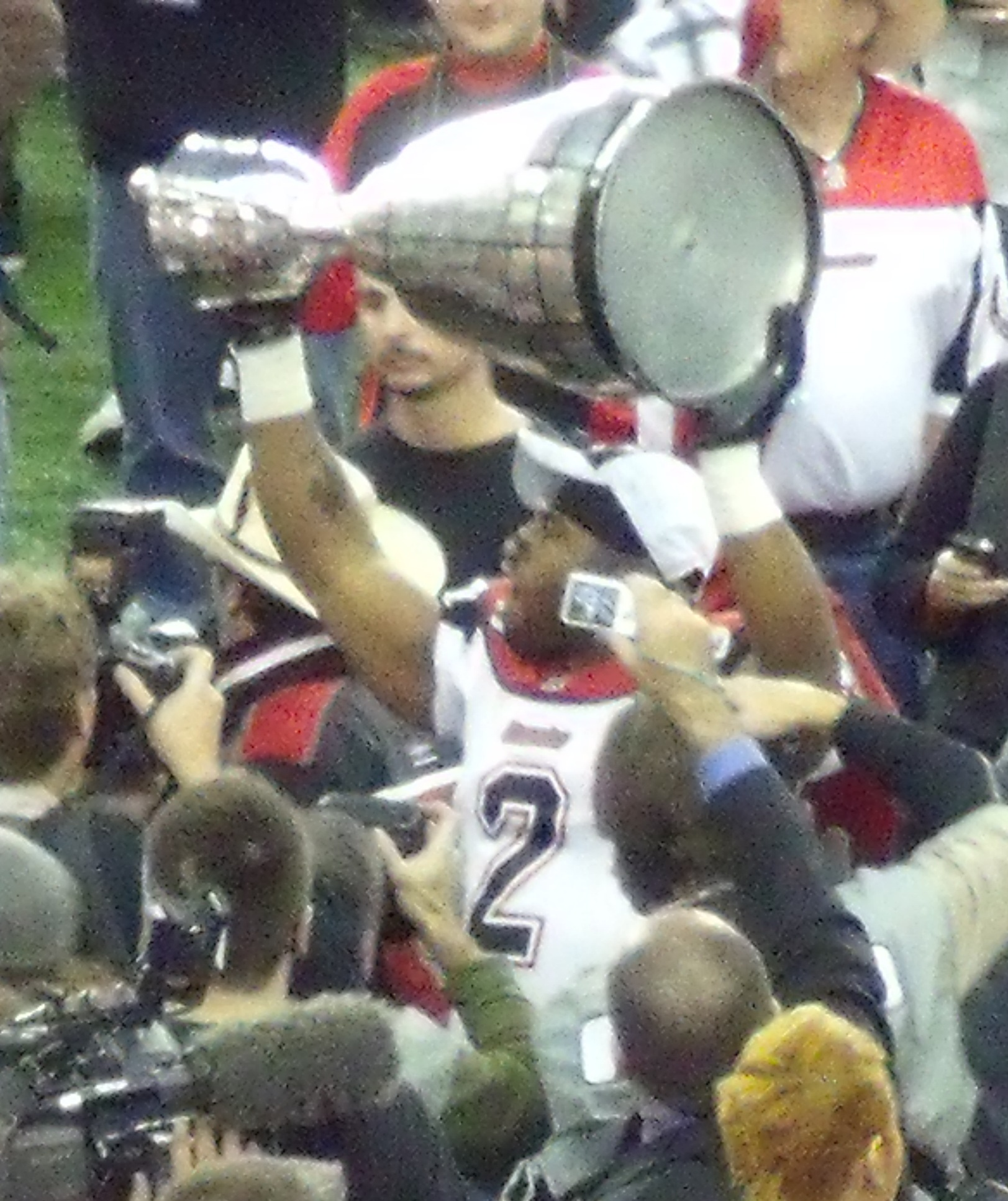
- Armour after winning the 96th Grey Cup

No. 33
- Positions: Safety, linebacker

Personal information
- Born: July 10, 1976 (age 50); Toledo, Ohio, U.S.
- Listed height: 6 ft 0 in (1.83 m)
- Listed weight: 225 lb (102 kg)

Career information
- High school: Central Catholic (Toledo, Ohio)
- College: Miami (Ohio)
- NFL draft: 1999: 7th round, 224th overall pick

Career history
- Oakland Raiders (1999)*; Jacksonville Jaguars (1999); Cincinnati Bengals (1999–2002); → Barcelona Dragons (2001); BC Lions (2004–2005); Hamilton Tiger-Cats (2006–2007); Calgary Stampeders (2008); BC Lions (2009)
- * Offseason or practice squad member only

Awards and highlights
- Grey Cup champion (2008); 2× MAC Defensive Player of the Year (1997, 1998); 2× First-team All-MAC (1997, 1998)
- Stats at Pro Football Reference
- Stats at CFL.ca (archive)

JoJuan Armour (born July 10, 1976) is an American former professional football player who was a safety in the National Football League (NFL) and a linebacker in the Canadian Football League (CFL). He is currently a high school football coach.

== Early life ==
Armour is a 1995 graduate of Central Catholic High School who was inducted into the school's athletic hall of fame in April 2006. Playing linebacker and running back on the high school football team, he was a two-time first-team All-City selection, a second-team Division I All-Ohio selection, and the 1994 Toledo City League player of the year.

== College career ==
Armour played football at Miami University as a linebacker. He earned three All-MAC selections and was a two-time MAC Defensive Player of the Year. In his career at Miami, he recorded 396 total tackles, 67 tackles for loss for a total of 297 lost yards, and 24.5 sacks. Armour was a third-team All-American selection in his senior year.

== Professional career ==
He was drafted by the Oakland Raiders in 1999 and was later signed by the Cincinnati Bengals in December 1999. Armour started for the Bengals in 2001 and 2002 and was released by them in August 2003. In June 2004 Armour was signed as a free agent by the British Columbia Lions and played for them in 2004 and 2005. After the 2005 season, Armour was signed by the Hamilton Tiger-Cats and played for them in the 2006 and 2007 seasons. In February 2008, he was signed by the Calgary Stampeders. He helped Calgary win the 2008 Grey Cup. He was later released on June 22, 2009 for overaggressive plays during training camp. On August 3, 2009, the BC Lions re-signed Armour. On February 25, 2010, Armour announced his retirement after six seasons in the CFL, having spent three with the BC Lions.

== Coaching career ==
Armour was a high school football defensive lineman coach for Whitmer High School in Toledo, Ohio. He is currently the head coach for the football team at Reynoldsburg High School in Reynoldsburg, Ohio.
