= Travis Prentice =

American football player (born 1976)

No. 41, 30
- Position: Running back

Personal information
- Born: October 27, 1976 (age 50); Louisville, Kentucky, U.S.
- Listed height: 5 ft 11 in (1.80 m)
- Listed weight: 221 lb (100 kg)

Career information
- High school: duPont Manual (Louisville)
- College: Miami (OH)
- NFL draft: 2000: 3rd round, 63rd overall pick

Career history
- Cleveland Browns (2000); Minnesota Vikings (2001); Houston Texans (2002)*; Arizona Cardinals (2002)
- * Offseason or practice squad member only

Awards and highlights
- Third-team All-American (1999); MAC Most Valuable Player (1998); MAC Offensive Player of the Year (1998); 3× First-team All-MAC (1997, 1998, 1999)

Career NFL statistics
- Rushing yards: 525
- Rushing average: 2.8
- Rushing touchdowns: 9
- Receptions: 38
- Receiving yards: 201
- Receiving touchdowns: 1
- Stats at Pro Football Reference

Travis Jason Prentice (born October 27, 1976) is an American former professional football player who was a running back in the National Football League (NFL). He played college football for the Miami RedHawks. Prentice held the NCAA Division I-A record for career rushing touchdowns until it was broken by Wisconsin's Montee Ball in 2012, and again by Keenan Reynolds of Navy in 2015.

== Early life ==
Prentice attended duPont Manual High School in Louisville, Kentucky, where he was first team All-District and second team All-State his senior year while running for 1,510 yards and 17 touchdowns.

== College career ==
Prentice was redshirted his freshman year. The next year, Prentice had a very productive season even though he never broke into the starting line-up. In his first game, he ran for 102 yards and two touchdowns; for the season he ran for 601 yards on 123 carries and 12 touchdowns.

In his sophomore year, Prentice earned a spot in Randy Walker's starting line-up and rushed for 1549 yards and 25 touchdowns. He was named first team All-Mid-American Conference and was one of eight semifinalists for the Doak Walker Award.

In Prentice's junior year he ran for 1787 yards and 19 touchdowns while leading the RedHawks to a 10–1 season. Once again he was one of eight semifinalists for the Doak Walker Award. He was edged by Marshall's Chad Pennington in the MAC's Vern Smith Award for player of the year.

His senior year was under a new head coach, Terry Hoeppner, who installed a more open passing attack rather than relying on the running game. Prentice ran for 1659 yards and 17 touchdowns. In the process he broke several Division I-A scoring records and was named third team All-American by the Associated Press.

Prentice ended his career at Miami with 5,596 yards on 1,138 carries and numerous school, conference and NCAA records. At one point he recorded 862 consecutive touches without a fumble.

On September 6, 2014, during halftime of the Eastern Kentucky game, Prentice became the fourth Miami RedHawk to have his football jersey retired. The previous three players were Ben Roethlisberger (#7), Bob Hitchens (#40), and John Pont (#42).

=== Notable games ===
vs. Akron (1999)

Prentice exploded for 376 rushing yards in a 32–23 win against Akron. This set the Mid-American Conference record for most yards in a single game. At the time it was the 6th highest rushing total in Division I-A history. On his final carry of the game he broke Ricky Williams' career records both for points scored and total touchdowns with a 72-yard touchdown run.

At North Carolina (1998)

Prentice helped lead the RedHawks to a 13–10 upset of the #12 ranked North Carolina Tar Heels, rushing for 162 yards and a touchdown. Most of his yards came in the second half, including several carries on the last drive that led to a last-second game-winning field goal by John Scott. It was the first time in ten years that one player rushed for more than 150 yards on UNC.

At Virginia Tech (1997)

Prentice helped Miami to a 24–17 win over then-undefeated and twelfth-ranked Virginia Tech. His numbers were not great (82 yards on 21 carries), but he ran for a touchdown on a game-changing fake field goal that was named CNN's "play of the day."

=== NCAA records (at the end of his career) ===
- Career rushing TDs (73)
- Career total TDs (78)
- Career points (468)
- Career points (non-kickers) (468)
- Games with TDs (35)
- Game with two or more TDs (25)
- Consecutive carries without a fumble, season (365)
- Consecutive carries without a fumble, career (862)

== Professional career ==
Prentice was the first pick in the third round by the Cleveland Browns in the 2000 NFL draft. As a rookie, he rushed for 512 yards and seven touchdowns, while also catching 37 passes, but was largely considered a bust due to his lowly 3.0 yards per carry average. He was cut by Cleveland after the 2000 season, and had just 14 carries with the Minnesota Vikings the following year. He then signed with the Arizona Cardinals, but did not play a single down with them and left the NFL after that.

== NFL career statistics ==
Legend
**Bold**	Career high

Year	Team	Games		Rushing					Receiving				
Year	Team	GP	GS	Att	Yds	Avg	Lng	TD	Rec	Yds	Avg	Lng	TD
2000	CLE	**16**	**11**	**173**	**512**	**3.0**	**17**	**7**	**37**	**191**	5.2	**13**	**1**
2001	MIN	14	0	14	13	0.9	6	2	1	10	**10.0**	10	0
		30	11	187	525	2.8	17	9	38	201	5.3	13	1

== See also ==
- List of Division I FBS rushing touchdown leaders
