= Miami RedHawks football =

American football team for Miami University

2026 Miami RedHawks football team
- First season: 1888; 138 years ago
- Athletic director: David Sayler
- Head coach: Chuck Martin; 12th season, 72–74 (.493)
- Location: Oxford, Ohio
- Stadium: Yager Stadium (capacity: 24,286)
- NCAA division: Division I FBS
- Conference: MAC
- Colors: Red and white
- All-time record: 740–496–44 (.595)
- Bowl record: 9–8–0 (.529)

Conference championships
- OAC: 1916, 1917, 1918, 1921 Buckeye: 1932, 1933, 1936 MAC: 1948, 1950, 1954, 1955, 1957, 1958, 1965, 1966, 1973, 1974, 1975, 1977, 1986, 2003, 2010, 2019, 2023

Division championships
- MAC East: 1998, 2003, 2004, 2005, 2007, 2010, 2016, 2019, 2023
- Rivalries: Cincinnati (rivalry); Ohio (rivalry); Ball State (rivalry)

Uniforms
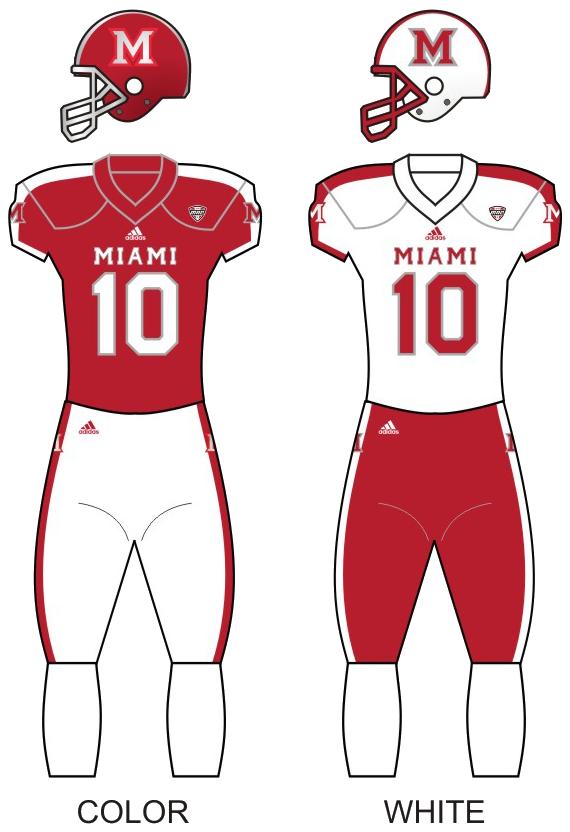
- Fight song: Love and Honor to Miami
- Mascot: Swoop the Redhawk
- Marching band: Miami University Marching Band
- Website: MiamiRedHawks.com

The Miami RedHawks football (known as the Miami Redskins until 1997) program represents Miami University, located in Oxford, Ohio, in college football at the NCAA Division I FBS level. The RedHawks compete in the Mid-American Conference and are known for producing several high-profile head coaches, earning it the nickname "Cradle of Coaches". The team is coached by Chuck Martin and plays its home games at Yager Stadium. Miami has the distinction of being the most successful program in the MAC with over 700 all-time wins.

== History ==
=== 1888–1943: Early history ===
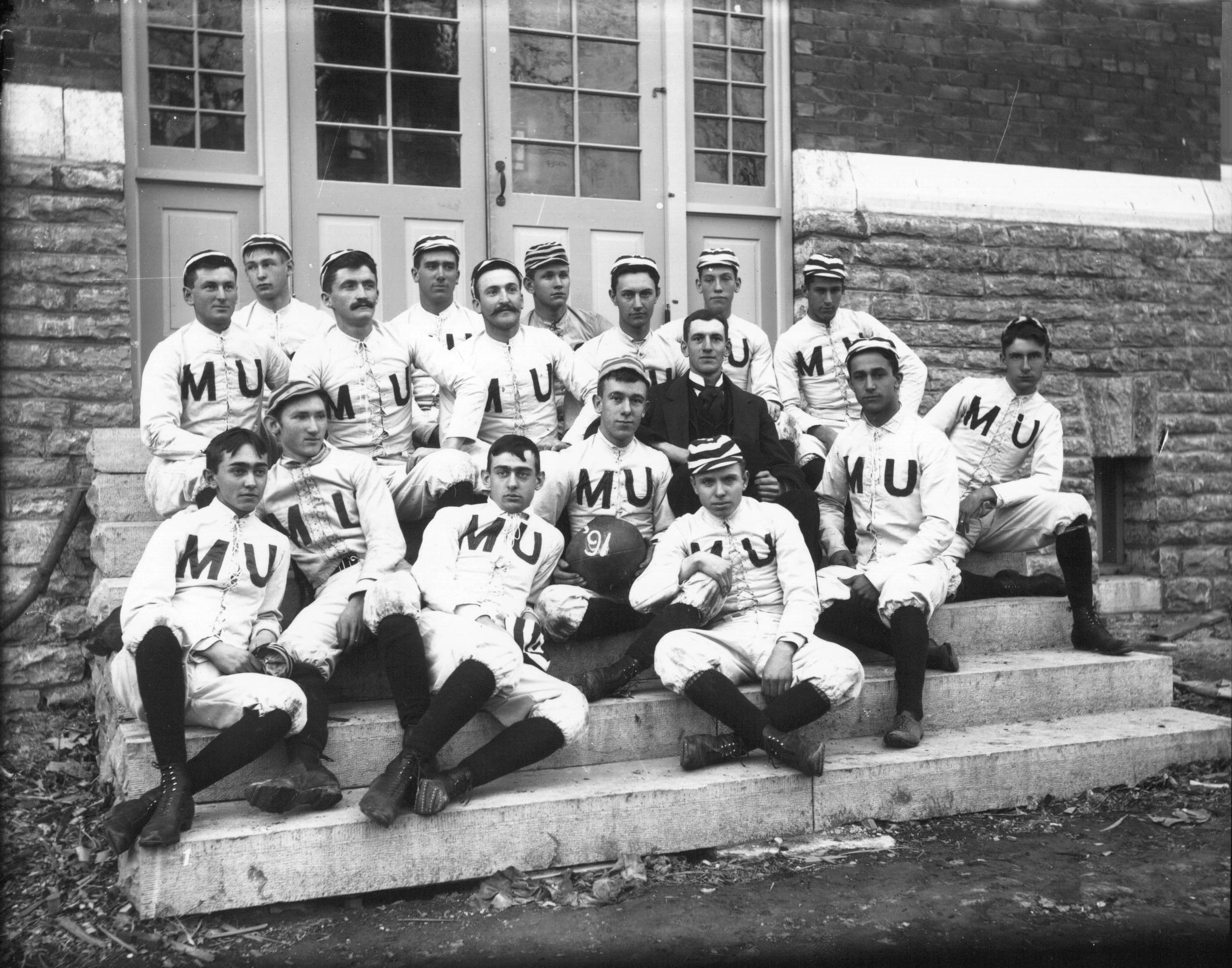
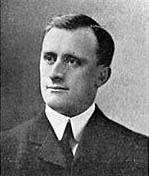
(Left): The 1891 Miami football team; (right): C. K. Fauver, Miami University's first head coach

Miami University first fielded a football team in 1888 with the mascot of the Redskins. There was no head football coach in the team's first two seasons or from 1898 to 1899 nor was there a team fielded in 1890. The team's first head coach was C. K. Fauver, who led MU in 1895 to a 3–0 record. Under head coach James C. Donnelly, the Redskins compiled a 14–8–2 record from 1912 to 1914. George Little was named Miami's head coach for the 1916 season succeeding Chester J. Roberts. His first team went 7–0–1 and won the Ohio Athletic Conference. This team gave up only six points, all in a game against Wooster, with the only blemish on their record being a 0–0 tie with Denison. Little's tenure was interrupted by his service in the armed forces during World War I. He served as a captain in the infantry from August 15, 1917, to August 7, 1918. He returned and led the Redskins to a 7–1 record in 1919 and a 5–2–1 record in 1920. He once again won the Ohio Athletic Conference championship in 1921 with a perfect 8–0 record. The 1921 team scored 238 points during the season and gave up only 13. In his four years as Miami's head coach, Little compiled a record of 27–3–2 including 21 games where the opponent did not score a single point. He left Miami to become Fielding H. Yost's top assistant at Michigan.

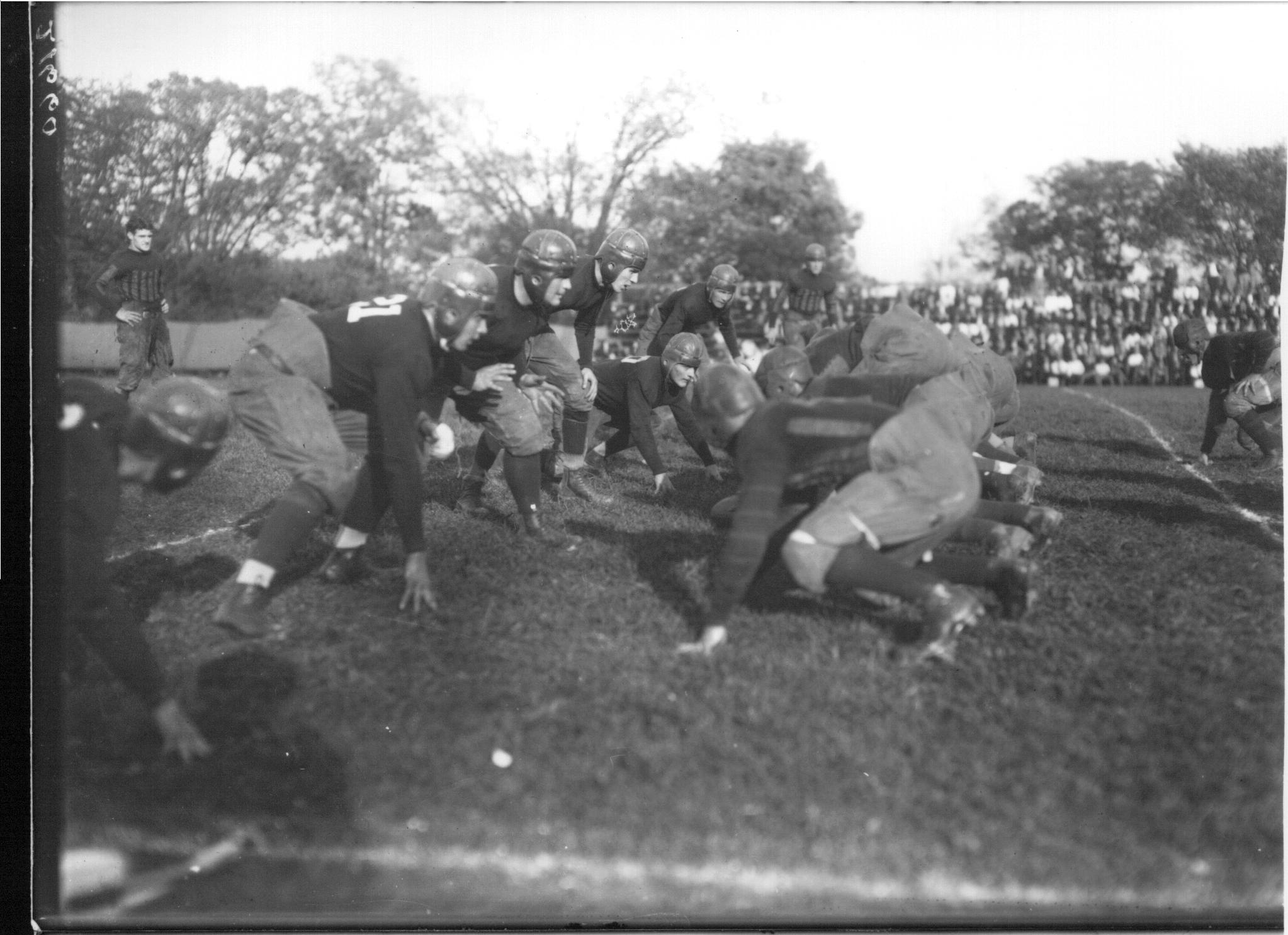
Miami and the University of Akron football team lining up at Miami Field in October 1922

Chester Pittser served as head football coach for the Redskins from 1924 through 1931 with a record of 41–25–2. Pittser came to Miami from Montana School of Mines where he coached football and basketball. While at Miami, he mentored future Pro Football Hall of Fame coaches, Paul Brown and Weeb Ewbank. Frank Wilton came to Miami from his post as an assistant coach at Stanford and installed Pop Warner's double wingback offensive system. In his first two years, 1932 and 1933, he led the Redskins to Buckeye Intercollegiate Athletic Association championships. In those two years he only lost three games, two to Big Ten Conference teams Indiana and Illinois. The next two years his teams won only five games each year, but returned to championship form in 1936 with a 7–2 record and a share of the conference title. The Redskins slid to a 4–4–1 record in 1937, but rebounded in 1938 with a 6–3 record. The last three years of Wilton's tenure saw a drastic downturn in victories. The 1939, 1940, and 1941 seasons produced a total of three wins. After the 1941 season he was replaced by Stu Holcomb. Shortly after the Japanese attack on Pearl Harbor, Wilton resigned his duties at Miami, effective at the end of the school year, to join the United States Navy. He left Miami with the most football wins in school history, a record he retained until Randy Walker surpassed him in 1997. Wilton's 44 wins remain third in Miami football history.

Stu Holcomb was named MU's head football coach for the 1942 season, succeeding Wilton. His first team went 3–6 which equaled the number of wins of the three previous years for the Redskins. The next year Holcomb and the Redskins posted a winning record of 8–2–1. This team was dominated by defense, only allowing their opponents to score in double digits twice; A 34–12 win over Bradley University and a 35–0 blow out loss to Arkansas A&M. In his two years as Miami's head coach he compiled an overall record of 10–9–1. He left Miami to become an assistant coach for Earl Blaik at Army.

=== 1944–1955: Gillman, Blackburn, Hayes and Parseghian eras ===
Miami joined the Mid-American Conference in 1947. Under head coach Sid Gillman, the Redskins compiled a record of 31–6–1. Gillman is best known for helping develop the deep downfield pass that helped make football the game it is today. Gillman's teams used that to great avail at Miami, as he led the Redskins to great success in his four seasons as head coach. Among Gillman's players at Miami was Paul Dietzel, who played center at Miami from 1946 to 1947 and would go on to win a national championship as head football coach at LSU. Gillman would go on to be inducted into the College Football Hall of Fame as a coach.

As an assistant, George Blackburn helped Sid Gillman lead the Miami Redskins to a victory over Texas Tech in the 1948 Sun Bowl. Blackburn was named head coach for the 1948 season after Gillman left. Blackburn stayed as Miami's head coach for one season guiding the team to 7–1–1 record and the 1948 Mid-American Conference championship. In 1949, Gillman took the head coaching position at Cincinnati and Blackburn joined him as an assistant coach there.

MU hired Woody Hayes away from Denison as head football coach after Blackburn's departure. In his first season at Miami, Hayes led the Redskins to a 5–4 record. In his second year with the Redskins, Hayes led the 1950 squad to a 9–1 record and an appearance in the Salad Bowl, where they defeated Arizona State. Before the game, Hayes stated that the Sun Devils were afraid to play Miami, because Miami would beat them by two touchdowns. Hayes made good on the statement, with the Redskins winning, 34–21. Hayes had helped bring The Miami football program back to prominence after several years of mediocrity and absence from the spotlight. That success led him to accept the Ohio State head coaching position on February 18, 1951, where Hayes would cement himself as one of college football's greatest coaches. Hayes' final record at Miami is 14–5.

Ara Parseghian was chosen to take over as head coach of the Redskins after Hayes' departure. Parseghian's teams at Miami consistently did well in the Mid-American Conference, posting a 7–3 record in 1951 and improving to 8–1 the following year. The Redskins were conference champions in 1954 and in 1955, when they went undefeated. Parseghian's success, which included two wins over larger Big Ten schools, raised his profile nationally as a head coaching prospect. In late 1955, he departed Miami and was hired to become head football coach at Northwestern, one of the Big Ten schools Miami had beaten. Parseghian compiled a 39–6–1 record in five seasons at Miami. After his tenure at Northwestern, Parseghian would go on to cement a Hall of Fame career as head coach at Notre Dame, where his teams won the national championship in 1966 and 1973. Parseghian's winning percentage at Miami (.859) is the highest of any full-time Miami head coach in the last 100 years.

=== 1956–1968: Pont and Schembechler eras ===
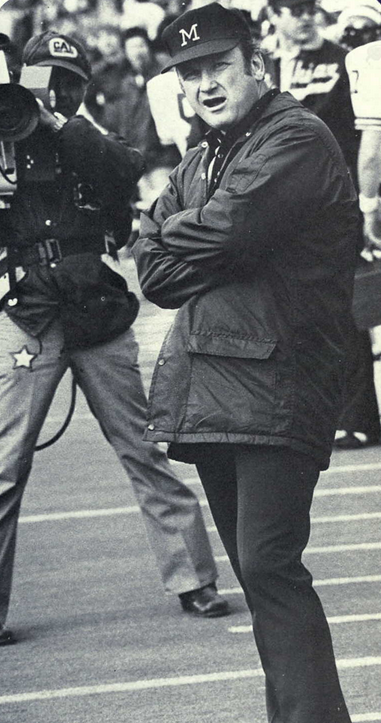
Head coach Bo Schembechler was 40–17–3 at Miami in the 1960s.

To replace Parseghian, Miami promoted John Pont from assistant coach to head coach. Pont was an alumnus of Miami who had played running back for the Redskins from 1949 to 1951. Under Pont's tutelage, the Redskins compiled a 43–22–2 record and made an appearance in the 1962 Tangerine Bowl (now known as the Buffalo Wild Wings Citrus Bowl), a game they lost to Houston. Pont would leave his alma mater after seven seasons to accept the head football coach position at Yale. Pont would go on to have success as head coach at Indiana, taking them to their only Rose Bowl appearance to date.

Miami went to a familiar name to find its next head coach. Bo Schembechler, an assistant coach at Ohio State under former Miami head coach Woody Hayes, was hired as Redskins head coach. Over the next six seasons, Schembechler led the Redskins to a 40–17–3 record, winning a pair of Mid-American Conference titles and finishing second three times. The team's top season was 1966, as Miami went 9–1 overall. Miami's offense was led during those seasons by future longtime NFL players, first Ernie Kellermann and then Bruce Matte. Schembechler's overall record at Miami was 40–17–3. Schembechler departed Miami after the 1968 season to accept the head football coach position at Michigan, where he would also go on to establish himself as one of college football's legendary coaches and rival Hayes' Buckeyes.

=== 1969–1982: Mallory, Crum and Reed eras ===
The Redskins went with another of Woody Hayes' Buckeye assistants to fill its head coaching vacancy. Bill Mallory was chosen to lead the Miami football program after Schembechler's departure. In Mallory's five seasons, the Redskins compiled a record of 39–12 with four straight 7–3 seasons and a perfect 11–0 in Mallory's fifth that finished ranked No. 17 and No. 15 in the final Coaches' and AP polls, respectively. Mallory won MAC Coach of the Year honors in 1973. Following the 1973 season, Mallory departed for the head coaching position at Colorado.

Dick Crum was promoted from assistant coach to head coach of the Redskins in 1974. He orchestrated several upset wins including victories over Kentucky in 1974, Purdue in 1975, and Indiana in 1977. Crum had three winning seasons in four years and won the Mid-American Conference three times. In his first two years, he led Miami to the Tangerine Bowl twice, where they beat Georgia in 1974 and South Carolina in 1975. Those two Miami teams ranked in the final AP poll at No. 10 in 1974 and No. 12 in 1975. In 1976, Miami's performance fell dramatically with a 3–8 finish. The team rebounded the next year with a 10–1 record. After the 1977 season, Crum accepted the head coaching position at North Carolina. Crum finished his stint at Miami with a record of 34–10–1.

Tom Reed served as the head coach at Miami from 1978 to 1982. His best seasons came in 1978 and 1981, when he led the Redskins to 8–2–1 records. Reed's squads orchestrated several big upset wins including a victory over North Carolina, coached by former Redskins head coach Dick Crum, during the 1978 season and a victory over Kentucky in 1979. Reed had four winning seasons in five years and tallied a career record of 34–19–2 at Miami. Among Reed's players at Miami was future Super Bowl winning head coach John Harbaugh, who played defensive back. One of Reed's assistant coaches was Jim Tressel, who would go on to great success as head football coach at Ohio State. After the 1982 season, Reed accepted the head coaching position at NC State.

=== 1983–1998: Rose and Walker eras ===
Tim Rose was promoted from defensive coordinator and served as the head coach of the Redskins from 1983 to 1989. He led the 1986 Miami squad to the Mid-American Conference championship and a berth in the California Bowl. That season, Rose orchestrated perhaps the biggest win in the program's history with a 21–12 victory over No. 8 ranked LSU in Baton Rouge. Even with his success in 1986, Rose only had two winning seasons in seven years at Miami and finished his tenure there with a record of 31–44–3 that included a streak of 20 games without a victory between 1987 and 1989. After the 1989 season, Rose's contract was not renewed. Rose was the first head coach since Edwin Sweetland in 1911 to leave Miami with a losing record.

Randy Walker became Miami's 30th head coach after Rose was let go. In his first year the Redskins posted a 5–5–1 record, a vast improvement for a team that had only won two games in the two previous years. Walker made steady improvement in his nine years, culminating with a 10–1 record in his last year with the team. This team was led by record-breaking running back Travis Prentice. Walker finished with 59–35–5 record including several victories over ranked opponents from major conference such as No. 25 Northwestern in 1995, No. 12 Virginia Tech in 1997 and No. 12 North Carolina in 1998. However, his teams never won the Mid-American Conference championship. Walker's offensive coordinator from 1994 to 1995 was future Super Bowl-winning head coach Sean Payton. Walker left Miami after the 1998 season to accept the head football coach position at Northwestern.

In 1996, the Miami Tribe of Oklahoma withdrew its support for the Redskins nickname. The board of trustees voted to change the nickname to the RedHawks in 1997.

=== 1999–2010: Hoeppner, Montgomery and Haywood eras ===
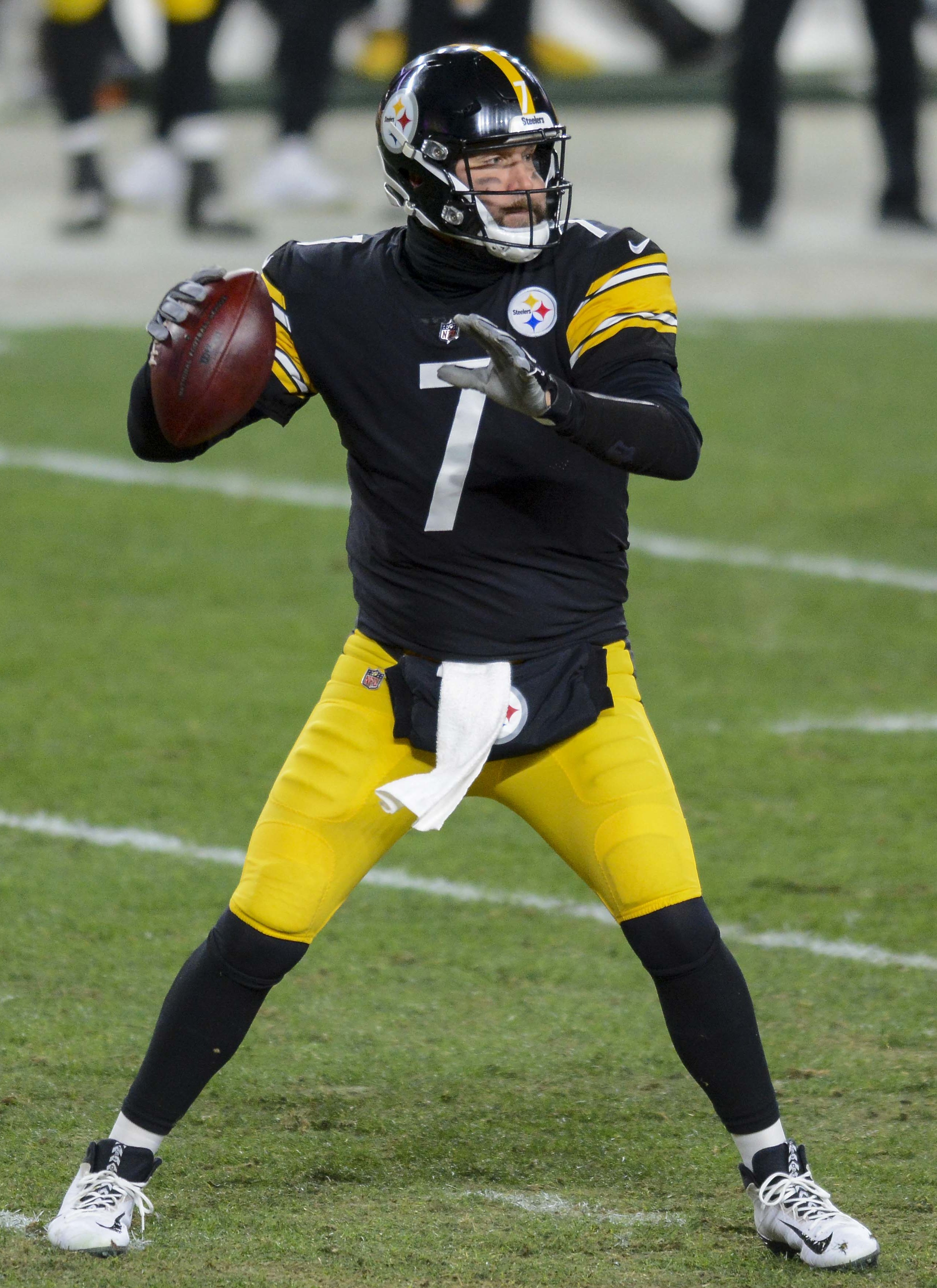
Quarterback Ben Roethlisberger played for Terry Hoeppner at Miami. The 2003 RedHawks finished No. 10 in the final AP poll.

After spending 13 years as an assistant at Miami, Terry Hoeppner became the RedHawks 31st head coach in 1999. He succeeded Randy Walker. Hoeppner's first game at Miami was against Walker and the Wildcats, which resulted in a 28–3 Miami victory. Despite the win, his first year was considered by some to be a disappointment. The RedHawks were coming off a 10–1 season, and returned several starters including record-breaking running back Travis Prentice, but were only able to post a 7–4 record. The drop-off was attributed in part to Hoeppner's installation of an open passing attack, rather than the running game Walker had used in the past. The change ended up paying dividends later, as Miami earned a 48–25 overall record in six seasons under Hoeppner and finished among the top three in the Mid-American Conference East in each of his six years at the helm. While at Miami, Hoeppner recruited and signed Ben Roethlisberger by promising to play him at quarterback, whereas other programs were recruiting Roethlisberger as a wide receiver or a tight end. Roethlisberger went on to achieve great success in the NFL as quarterback of the Pittsburgh Steelers. Hoeppner's best season was 2003 when Miami, quarterbacked by Roethlisberger, went 13–1 and finished No. 10 in the final AP poll. Hoeppner would leave the RedHawks to accept the head football coach position at Indiana after the 2004 season.

After spending four years as offensive coordinator at Miami, Shane Montgomery was promoted to head coach, becoming the RedHawks' 32nd in school history. In his first year, the RedHawks posted a 7–4 record including a tie for first place in the MAC East division. Akron won the tie breaker and represented the East in the MAC Championship Game. However, Montgomery's RedHawks were never a consistent winner. On November 29, 2008, Montgomery resigned under pressure as head coach of the RedHawks, after four seasons and a 17–31 record.

On December 23, 2008, Notre Dame offensive coordinator Mike Haywood was named the 33rd head coach of the RedHawks. Haywood was the first African American head football coach at Miami University and is the only in school history. After going 1–11 in his first season, Haywood led the Redhawks to a 10–4 record in his second season and a MAC title. He was named the 2010 Mid-American Conference coach of the year. Haywood left Miami after two seasons and a 10–15 record to accept the head football coach position at Pittsburgh. However, sixteen days later, on New Year's Eve, Haywood was arrested on domestic violence charges against the mother of his son in South Bend, Indiana and was fired by Pitt the next day before ever coaching a game, holding a practice, recruiting a player or even hiring an assistant coach.

=== 2011–present: Treadwell and Martin eras ===
On December 31, 2010, the same day Haywood was arrested, Miami hired Michigan State offensive coordinator and Miami alumnus Don Treadwell as its 34th head coach. Treadwell played wide receiver for Miami from 1978 to 1981 for head coach Tom Reed. Under Treadwell, the RedHawks struggled, compiling back to back 4–8 yearly records in 2011 and 2012 before beginning the 2013 0–5, leading to Treadwell's firing as head coach. The rest of the 2013 season was led by interim head coach Mike Bath. The RedHawks would fail to win a single game in 2013, finishing 0–12.

On December 3, 2013, Notre Dame offensive coordinator Chuck Martin was announced as the 35th head football coach of the Miami RedHawks. Martin also had a highly successful run as head coach at NCAA Division II power Grand Valley State, compiling a 74–7 record in six seasons that included two national championships and a national runner-up.

In Martin's first season, the RedHawks' 21-game losing streak finally came to an end with a last-minute victory over UMass. The RedHawks also defeated Kent State en route to a 2–10 record for the season. The RedHawks finished 3–9 in 2015. After defeating Presbyterian in the season opener, Miami also defeated Eastern Michigan and UMass.

In 2016, Martin's RedHawks struggled the first half of the season, starting the season at 0–6. However, the RedHawks recovered, winning their final six games of the regular season, becoming the first team in FBS history to win their final six games after losing their first six. The RedHawks earned a berth in the St. Petersburg Bowl, a game they lost to Mississippi State by a score of 17- 16. The RedHawks finished the season with a 6–7 record.

== Conference affiliations ==
- Independent (1888–1910; 1940–1946)
- Ohio Athletic Conference (1911–1927)
- Buckeye Athletic Association (1926–1939)
- Mid-American Conference (1947–present)

== Championships ==
=== Conference championships ===
Miami has won 23 conference titles, nineteen outright and four shared.

Season	Conference	Head coach	Overall record	Conference record
1916	Ohio Athletic Conference	George Little	7–0–1	6–0–1
1917	Ohio Athletic Conference	George Rider	6–0–2	5–0–1
1918	Ohio Athletic Conference	George Rider	5–0–1	4–0–1
1921	Ohio Athletic Conference	George Little	8–0	7–0
1932	Buckeye Conference	Frank Wilton	7–1	–
1933†	Buckeye Conference	Frank Wilton	7–2	–
1936†	Buckeye Conference	Frank Wilton	7–1–1	–
1948	Mid-American Conference	George Blackburn	7–1–1	4–0
1950	Mid-American Conference	Woody Hayes	9–1	4–0
1954	Mid-American Conference	Ara Parseghian	8–1	4–0
1955	Mid-American Conference	Ara Parseghian	9–0	5–0
1957	Mid-American Conference	John Pont	6–3	5–0
1958	Mid-American Conference	John Pont	6–3	5–0
1965†	Mid-American Conference	Bo Schembechler	7–3	5–1
1966†	Mid-American Conference	Bo Schembechler	9–1	5–1
1973	Mid-American Conference	Bill Mallory	11–0	5–0
1974	Mid-American Conference	Dick Crum	10–0–1	5–0
1975	Mid-American Conference	Dick Crum	11–1	6–0
1977	Mid-American Conference	Dick Crum	10–1	5–0
1986	Mid-American Conference	Tim Rose	8–4	6–2
2003	Mid-American Conference	Terry Hoeppner	13–1	8–0
2010	Mid-American Conference	Michael Haywood	10–4	7–1
2019	Mid-American Conference	Chuck Martin	8–5	6–2
2023	Mid-American Conference	Chuck Martin	11–2	7–2

† Co-champion

=== Division championships ===
Year	Division	Coach	Opponent	CG result
1998†	MAC East	Randy Walker	N/A lost tiebreaker to Marshall	
2003	MAC East	Terry Hoeppner	Bowling Green	W 49–27
2004	MAC East	Terry Hoeppner	Toledo	L 27–35
2005†	MAC East	Shane Montgomery	N/A lost tiebreaker to Akron	
2007†	MAC East	Shane Montgomery	Central Michigan	L 10–35
2010	MAC East	Michael Haywood	Northern Illinois	W 26–21
2016†	MAC East	Chuck Martin	N/A lost tiebreaker to Ohio	
2019	MAC East	Chuck Martin	Central Michigan	W 26–21
2023	MAC East	Chuck Martin	Toledo	W 23–14

† Co-champion

== Head coaches ==
Tenure	Season(s)	Coach	Record	Pct.	Bowl games
1888–1889		No coach	4–0–1	.900	
1890		No team		–	
1891–1894		No coach	7–5	.583	
1895	1	C. K. Fauver	3–0	1.000	
1896	1	Ernest Merrell	3–1	.750	
1897	1	Herbert J. McIntire	2–4–1	.357	
1898		No coach	0–2	.000	
1899	1	George Greenleaf	1–5	.167	
1900	1	Alonzo Edwin Branch	0–4	.000	
1901	1	Thomas Hazzard	1–3–1	.300	
1902–1903	2	Peter McPherson	6–7–1	.464	
1904	1	Arthur Smith	1–5	.167	
1905		No coach	4–3	.571	
1906	1	Arthur H. Parmelee	1–5–1	.214	
1907–1908	2	Amos Foster	13–1	.929	
1909–1910	2	Harold Iddings	5–8–1	.393	
1911	1	Edwin Sweetland	2–4–2	.375	
1912–1914	3	James C. Donnelly	14–8–2	.625	
1915	1	Chester J. Roberts	6–2	.750	
1916	1	George Little	7–0–1	.938	
1917–1918	2	George Rider	11–0–3	.893	
1919–1921	3	George Little	20–3–1	.854	
1922–1923	2	Harry W. Ewing	7–7–2	.500	
1924–1931	8	Chester Pittser	41–25–2	.618	
1932–1941	10	Frank Wilton	44–39–5	.528	
1942–1943	2	Stu Holcomb	10–8–1	.553	
1944–1947	4	Sid Gillman	31–6–1	.829	1–0
1948	1	George Blackburn	7–1–1	.833	
1949–1950	2	Woody Hayes	14–5	.737	1–0
1951–1955	5	Ara Parseghian	39–6–1	.859	
1956–1962	7	John Pont	43–22–2	.657	0–1
1963–1968	6	Bo Schembechler	40–17–3	.692	
1969–1973	5	Bill Mallory	39–12	.765	1–0
1974–1977	4	Dick Crum	34–10–1	.767	2–0
1978–1982	5	Tom Reed	34–19–2	.636	
1983–1989	7	Tim Rose	31–44–3	.417	0–1
1990–1998	1	Randy Walker	58–36–5	.611	
1999–2004	6	Terry Hoeppner	48–25	.658	1–1
2005–2008	4	Shane Montgomery	17–31	.354	
2009–2010	2	Mike Haywood	10–15	.400	
2010	1	Lance Guidry†	1–0	1.000	1–0
2011–2013	3	Don Treadwell	8–21	.276	
2013	1	Mike Bath†	0–7	.000	
2014–present	12	Chuck Martin	71-72	.497	2–4

† Interim

== Bowl games ==
The RedHawks are 9–8 all time in bowl games.

Season	Coach	Bowl	Opponent	Result
1947	George Blackburn and Sid Gillman	Sun Bowl	Texas Tech	W 13–12
1950	Woody Hayes	Salad Bowl	Arizona State	W 34–21
1962	John Pont	Tangerine Bowl	Houston	L 21–49
1973	Bill Mallory	Tangerine Bowl	Florida	W 16–7
1974	Dick Crum	Tangerine Bowl	Georgia	W 21–10
1975	Dick Crum	Tangerine Bowl	South Carolina	W 20–7
1986	Tim Rose	California Bowl	San Jose State	L 7–37
2003	Terry Hoeppner	GMAC Bowl	Louisville	W 49–28
2004	Terry Hoeppner	Independence Bowl	Iowa State	L 13–17
2010	Lance Guidry†	GoDaddy.com Bowl	Middle Tennessee	W 35–21
2016	Chuck Martin	St. Petersburg Bowl	Mississippi State	L 16–17
2019	Chuck Martin	LendingTree Bowl	Louisiana	L 17–27
2021	Chuck Martin	Frisco Football Classic	North Texas	W 27–14
2022	Chuck Martin	Bahamas Bowl	UAB	L 20–24
2023	Chuck Martin	Cure Bowl	Appalachian State	L 9–13
2024	Chuck Martin	Arizona Bowl	Colorado State	W 43–17
2025	Chuck Martin	Arizona Bowl	Fresno State	L 3–18

† Interim

== Rivalry games ==
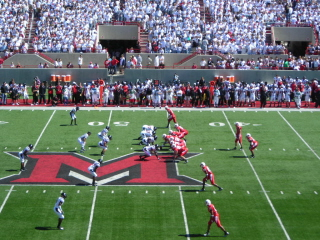
Miami facing off against Cincinnati at Yager Stadium in 2007

=== Cincinnati ===
The Victory Bell is awarded to the winner of the game between the Cincinnati Bearcats football team and the RedHawks. Having first been played in 1888, the rivalry is tied for being the oldest in the NCAA Division I Football Bowl Subdivision, and is the oldest current non-conference college football rivalry in the United States (though the teams were briefly conference rivals in the late 1940s and early 1950s). It is also among the most played college football rivalries, with 128 meetings total. The final scheduled game is in 2026. As of the last meeting in 2024, Cincinnati leads the all-time series 61–60–7.

=== Ohio ===
The Battle of the Bricks rivalry between the Ohio Bobcats football team and Miami was first played in 1908. The two oldest universities in Ohio, both schools are members of the Mid-American Conference. In the 2024 season the teams met a second time in the MAC Championship game. As of the last meeting in 2025, Miami leads the all-time series 56–44–2.

=== Ball State ===
Miami first played the Ball State Cardinals football team in 1931. Their rivalry began when Ball State joined the Mid-American Conference in the 1970s. Since 2017, the rivalry has been a protected cross-division game in the conference, with the RedHawks competing for the Red Bird Rivalry trophy against Ball State. Through 2025, Miami leads the all-time series 25–13–1.

== Stadium ==
- Unknown (1888–1895)
- Miami Field (1896–1982)
- Yager Stadium (1983–present)

== Cradle of Coaches ==
Name	Position at Miami	Later head coach at
Earl Blaik	Assistant coach/Player	Army Black Knights
Paul Brown	Player	Ohio State Buckeyes/Great Lakes Navy Bluejackets/Cleveland Browns/Cincinnati Bengals
Jim Young	Assistant coach	Purdue Boilermakers/Army Black Knights
Ara Parseghian	Head coach/Player	Northwestern Wildcats/Notre Dame Fighting Irish
John Pont	Head coach/Player	Indiana Hoosiers/Northwestern Wildcats
Carm Cozza	Assistant coach	Yale Bulldogs
Woody Hayes	Head coach	Ohio State Buckeyes
Bo Schembechler	Head coach/Player	Michigan Wolverines
Bill Mallory	Head coach	Indiana Hoosiers
Sean Payton	Offensive Coordinator	New Orleans Saints
Randy Walker	Head coach/Player	Northwestern Wildcats
Jim Tressel	Assistant coach	Youngstown State Penguins/Ohio State Buckeyes
Terry Hoeppner	Head coach	Indiana Hoosiers
John Harbaugh	Player	Baltimore Ravens/New York Giants
Kevin Wilson	Assistant coach	Indiana Hoosiers
Aaron Kromer	Offensive Coordinator/Offensive Line	New Orleans Saints
Ron Zook	Player	Florida Gators/Illinois Fighting Illini
Sean McVay	Wide Receiver	Los Angeles Rams
Nobby Wirkowski	Player	Toronto Argonauts (CFL)/York Lions (OUA)

== Logos and uniforms ==
On July 24, 2013, the Miami Redhawks held a launch event for new Adidas uniforms for the 2013 football season. Two Miami uniforms were released at the event and each design was paired with new chrome helmets. The white away uniform included red shoulders with the new "MIAMI" wordmark across the top. The red design included white shoulders with the new "MIAMI" wordmark.

== Hall of Fame inductees ==
=== College Football Hall of Fame ===
Name	Position	Years	Inducted	Ref.
Earl Blaik	End	1915–1917	1964	
George Little	Coach	1916, 1919–1921	1955	
Sid Gillman	Coach	1944–1947	1989	
Carm Cozza	QB	1949–1951	2002	
Woody Hayes	Coach	1949–1950	1983	
Ara Parseghian	Coach	1951–1955	1980	
Bo Schembechler	Coach	1963–1968	1993	
Bob Babich	LB	1966–1968	1994	

=== Pro Football Hall of Fame ===
Name	Position	Career	Inducted	Ref.
Paul Brown	Coach	1946–1975	1967	
Weeb Ewbank	Coach	1954–1973	1978	
Sid Gillman	Coach	1955–1981	1983	

== Retired numbers ==
Miami RedHawks retired numbers
No.	Player	Pos.	Tenure	No. ret.	Ref.
7	Ben Roethlisberger	QB	2000–2003	2007	
40	Bob Hitchens	RB	1971–1973		
42	John Pont	HB	1949–1951		

== Other notable players and coaches ==
- Jerry Angelo
- Brandon Brooks
- Rob Carpenter
- Carm Cozza
- Tom Crabtree
- Paul Dietzel
- Gary Gussman
- John Harbaugh
- Terry Hoeppner
- Stu Holcomb
- Bill Mallory
- Joe Novak
- Dean Pees
- Sean Payton
- Brian Pillman
- Travis Prentice
- Dan Raudabaugh
- George Rider
- Ryne Robinson
- Sean McVay
- Sherman Smith
- Milt Stegall
- George Swarn
- Edwin Sweetland
- Leigh C. Turner
- Randy Walker
- Nobby Wirkowski
- Ron Zook

== Future non-conference opponents ==
Announced schedules as of October 14, 2026.

2027	2028	2029	2030	2031	2032	2033	2034
Stonehill	at Indiana	Norfolk State	at Indiana	at Nebraska	at Purdue	James Madison	at James Madison
vs. Nebraska*	Western Kentucky		at UConn			at UNLV	
at Purdue							
at Western Kentucky							

*Will be played at Arrowhead Stadium in Kansas City.
