= 2010 Mid-American Conference football season =

- League: NCAA Division I Football Bowl Subdivision)
- Sport: Football
- Duration: September 2, 2010 through January, 2011
- Teams: 13
- TV partner(s): ABC, ESPN, ESPN2, Big Ten Network

Regular Season
- Season MVP: Chad Spann
- East champions: Miami
- West champions: Northern Illinois

MAC Championship Game
- Champions: Miami
- Finals MVP: Thomas Merriweather, Miami

Football seasons
- 2009 2011

2010 Mid-American Conference football standings
	Conf.			Overall
Team	W		L	W		L
East Division
Miami (OH) x$	7	–	1	10	–	4
Ohio	6	–	2	8	–	5
Temple	5	–	3	8	–	4
Kent State	4	–	4	5	–	7
Bowling Green	1	–	7	2	–	10
Buffalo	1	–	7	2	–	10
Akron	1	–	7	1	–	11
West Division
Northern Illinois x	8	–	0	11	–	3
Toledo	7	–	1	8	–	5
Western Michigan	5	–	3	6	–	6
Ball State	3	–	5	4	–	8
Central Michigan	2	–	6	3	–	9
Eastern Michigan	2	–	6	2	–	10
Championship: Miami 26, Northern Illinois 21
$ – Conference champion; x – Division champion/co-champions

The 2010 Mid-American Conference football season was the 65th season for the Mid-American Conference (MAC). The season began on Thursday, September 2, with five games: Ball State hosted Southeast Missouri State, Central Michigan hosted Hampton, Kent State hosted Murray State, Buffalo hosted Rhode Island, and Northern Illinois traveled to Ames, Iowa to face Iowa State. The conference's other eight teams began their respective 2010 seasons of NCAA Division I FBS (Football Bowl Subdivision) competition on Friday, September 3, and Saturday, September 4. The first in-conference game was September 9, with Temple hosting Central Michigan.

The 2010 MAC Championship Game featured the Northern Illinois Huskies and the Miami RedHawks, held December 3, at Ford Field in Detroit. Miami defeated Northern Illinois 26–21 on a 33-yard pass from Austin Boucher to Armand Robinson for a touchdown with 33 seconds remaining in regulation.

Four MAC teams were invited to post-season bowl games, with conference champion Miami, West Division champion Northern Illinois, West Division runner-up Toledo, and East Division runner-up Ohio getting bids. The only bowl-eligible schools not to receive invitations were Western Michigan (6–6) and Temple (8–4), the latter being the first team with a winning record to be passed over for a team with a .500 record under an NCAA rule change.

== Conference realignment ==
The Mid-American Conference was entirely left out of the 2010 NCAA conference realignment, with no school entering or leaving the conference. There was some speculation that football-only member Temple was under consideration to become a football-only member of the Big East Conference.

After being rebuffed by the Big East in November, the University of Massachusetts Amherst Minutemen are expected to become a football-only member starting in the fall of 2013, following a two-year transition from the Football Championship Subdivision to the Football Bowl Subdivision. The arrangement is expected to be similar to Temple's, with UMass required to schedule certain numbers of non-conference games in other sports against MAC schools.

== Preseason ==
=== Preseason poll ===
The 2010 MAC Preseason poll results were announced at the Football Media Preview in Detroit on July 30. In the West Division, Northern Illinois was picked as champion, while Temple was picked to win the East Division and the MAC Championship Game.

==== East Division ====
1. Temple – 137 points; 17 first-place votes
2. Ohio – 116 points; 3 first-place votes
3. Kent State – 94 points
4. Bowling Green – 74 points
5. Miami – 53 points
6. Buffalo – 48 points
7. Akron – 38 points

==== West Division ====
1. Northern Illinois – 115 points; 15 first-place votes
2. Central Michigan – 83 points; 3 first-place votes
3. Western Michigan – 77 points; 2 first-place votes
4. Toledo – 75 points
5. Ball State – 50 points
6. Eastern Michigan – 20 points

==== MAC Championship ====
Three votes were not cast for any team.

1. Temple – 11 votes
2. Northern Illinois – 5 votes
3. Ohio – 1 votes

== Head coaches ==
East Division

- Rob Ianello, Akron (1st Year)
- Dave Clawson, Bowling Green (2nd Year)
- Jeff Quinn, Buffalo (1st Year)
- Doug Martin, Kent State (6th Year)
- Michael Haywood, Miami (2nd Year)
- Frank Solich, Ohio (6th Year)
- Al Golden, Temple (5th Year)

West Division

- Stan Parrish, Ball State (2nd Year)
- Dan Enos, Central Michigan (1st Year)
- Ron English, Eastern Michigan (2nd Year)
- Jerry Kill, Northern Illinois (3rd Year)
- Tim Beckman, Toledo (2nd Year)
- Bill Cubit Western Michigan (6th Year)

=== Post-season coaching changes ===
On November 21, the day after Kent State's seventh loss of the season assured them of a losing record, Doug Martin announced that he would resign at the end of the season. On December 20, Kent State athletic director Joel Nielsen introduced former Ohio State receivers coach Darrell Hazell as the new head coach for the Golden Flashes. Hazell was the first Ohio State assistant coach to leave for a head coaching job in six years; the last was Mark Snyder, who was hired by Marshall in 2004.

On November 23, three days after Ball State concluded its season with a 4–8 record, Ball State athletic director Tom Collins announced the firing of Stan Parrish, saying, "As we evaluated the on-field performance and the football program in its entirety, we decided it was time for a change in direction in the leadership of the program". On December 19, Collins announced that he had hired Pete Lembo, formerly the head coach at Elon.

On December 5, Northern Illinois head coach Jerry Kill accepted the position of head coach for the Minnesota Golden Gophers. His announcement came less than two weeks before the Huskies were scheduled to play in the Humanitarian Bowl. Leaving the team in the manner he did (many teammates learned about his new job via Twitter instead of from Kill himself) dealt an emotional blow to the members of the team; star quarterback Chandler Harnish saying about Kill's departure, "I have a horrible taste in my mouth". Additionally, besides the emotional impact, USA Today noted "The timing of the announcement further hurts the program due to Kill most likely taking the bulk of his staff to Minnesota." On December 9, linebackers coach Tom Matukewicz was announced as the interim head coach for the Huskies bowl game, and on December 13, the university hired Wisconsin Badgers defensive coordinator Dave Doeren as the head coach, to begin after the Humanitarian Bowl.

On December 12, ESPN reported that Al Golden was offered and accepted the head coaching job at the University of Miami. Prior to the 2010 season, provisions requiring bowls to pick teams with seven or more wins if available before picking six-win teams were eliminated from NCAA bylaws, and Temple was the first team go uninvited under the rule change, despite going 8–4 including a win over eventual Big East BCS representative Connecticut. On December 22, a rumor was quickly confirmed that Florida offensive coordinator, and former Florida interim head coach (winter of 2009–2010), Steve Addazio would be the new Temple coach.

On December 16, ESPN reported that Michael Haywood, who had been named the 2010 Mid-American Conference Football Coach of the Year days before, had accepted the head football coaching position at the University of Pittsburgh. Haywood was arrested in South Bend, Indiana, on December 31, 2010, on felony domestic violence charges arising from a custody dispute, and was fired by Pittsburgh hours after being released on bond the next morning. Defensive backs coach Lance Guidry will coach Miami University in the 2011 GoDaddy.com Bowl. On December 31, 2010, Miami University hired Michigan State offensive coordinator Don Treadwell as its head coach.

== Schedules ==
In any given year, each team plays all the other teams in the same division, and about half the teams in the opposite division.

=== Homecoming games ===
October 2

- Ohio at Eastern Michigan 12:00 pm
- Idaho at Western Michigan 2:00 pm
- Northern Illinois at Akron 6:00 pm

October 9

- Western Michigan at Ball State 12:00 pm
- Akron at Kent State 3:30 pm

October 16

- Miami University at Central Michigan 12:00 pm
- Buffalo at Northern Illinois 2:30 pm
- Akron at Ohio 2:00 pm

October 23

- Ohio at Miami University 1:00 pm

=== Bye weeks ===
- Week four: Kent State, Western Michigan
- Week six: Buffalo
- Week ten: Eastern Michigan, Northern Illinois, Toledo, Bowling Green, Miami
- Week eleven: Ohio, Akron, Temple
- Week twelve: Central Michigan
- Week thirteen: Ball State

== Season ==
Index to colors and formatting
MAC member won
MAC member lost
MAC teams in **bold**

=== Week one ===
Date	Time	Visiting team	Home team	Site	TV	Result	Attendance	Ref.
September 2	7:00 pm	Southeast Missouri State	**Ball State**	Scheumann Stadium • Muncie, Indiana		**W** 10–27	10,753	
September 2	7:00 pm	Rhode Island	**Buffalo**	University at Buffalo Stadium • Amherst, New York		**W** 0–31	16,273	
September 2	7:00 pm	Hampton	**Central Michigan**	Kelly/Shorts Stadium • Mount Pleasant, Michigan		**W** 0–33	17,311	
September 2	7:00 pm	Murray State	**Kent State**	Dix Stadium • Kent, Ohio		**W** 10–41	16,535	
September 2	8:00 pm	**Northern Illinois**	Iowa State	Jack Trice Stadium • Ames, Iowa		**L** 10–27	43,116	
September 3	5:00 pm	Villanova	**Temple**	Lincoln Financial Field • Philadelphia	ESPN3	**W** 24–31	32,193	
September 3	8:00 pm	Arizona	**Toledo**	Glass Bowl • Toledo, Ohio	ESPN	**L** 41–2	25,907	
September 4	12:00 pm	**Western Michigan**	Michigan State	Spartan Stadium • East Lansing, Michigan	ESPN2	**L** 14–38	75,769	
September 4	12:00 pm	**Miami University**	No. 4/3 Florida	Ben Hill Griffin Stadium • Gainesville, Florida	ESPN	**L** 12–34	90,178	
September 4	6:00 pm	Syracuse	**Akron**	InfoCision Stadium • Akron, Ohio		**L** 29–3	15,969	
September 4	7:00 pm	Army	**Eastern Michigan**	Rynearson Stadium • Ypsilanti, Michigan		**L** 27–31	11,318	
September 4	7:00 pm	Wofford	**Ohio**	Peden Stadium • Athens, Ohio		**W** 10–33	22,955	
September 4	7:00 pm	**Bowling Green**	Troy	Veterans Memorial Stadium • Troy, Alabama		**L** 27–30	19,886	
^{#}Rankings from AP / Coaches polls released prior to game. All times are in Eastern Time.

Temple running back Bernard Pierce had been considered a possible Heisman candidate before the season, but he was dropped from watchlists following an underwhelming week 1 performance. Pierce carried 20 times for 75 yards and no touchdowns in Temple's win over Villanova.

=== Week two ===
Date	Time	Visiting team	Home team	Site	TV	Result	Attendance	Ref.
September 9	7:00 pm	**Central Michigan**	**Temple**	Lincoln Financial Field • Philadelphia	ESPNU	10–13 ^{OT}	15,152	
September 11	12:00 pm	Gardner–Webb	**Akron**	InfoCision Stadium • Akron, Ohio		**L** 38–37 ^{OT}	10,046	
September 11	2:00 pm	**Eastern Michigan**	**Miami University**	Yager Stadium • Oxford, Ohio	SportsTime Ohio	21–28	12,857	
September 11	3:30 pm	**Kent State**	Boston College	Alumni Stadium • Chestnut Hill, Massachusetts	ESPNU	**L** 13–26	35,122	
September 11	7:00 pm	**Toledo**	**Ohio**	Peden Stadium • Athens, Ohio		20–13	19,455	
September 11	7:00 pm	**Bowling Green**	Tulsa	Chapman Stadium • Tulsa, Oklahoma		**L** 20–33	19,565	
September 11	7:00 pm	**Buffalo**	Baylor	Floyd Casey Stadium • Waco, Texas		**L** 6–34	40,853	
September 11	7:00 pm	Liberty	**Ball State**	Scheumann Stadium • Muncie, Indiana		**L** 27–23	9,110	
September 11	7:00 pm	North Dakota	**Northern Illinois**	Huskie Stadium • Dekalb, Illinois		**W** 17–23	18,046	
September 11	7:00 pm	Nicholls State	**Western Michigan**	Waldo Stadium • Kalamazoo, Michigan		**W** 14–49	19,327	
^{#}Rankings from AP / Coaches polls released prior to game. All times are in Eastern Time.

=== Week three ===
Date	Time	Visiting team	Home team	Site	TV	Result	Attendance	Ref.
September 18	12:00 p.m.	Connecticut	**Temple**	Lincoln Financial Field • Philadelphia	ESPN+/ESPN GamePlan/ESPN3.com	**W** 16–30	18,702	
September 18	12:00 p.m.	**Ball State**	Purdue	Ross–Ade Stadium • West Lafayette, Indiana	Big Ten Network	**L** 13–24	54,124	
September 18	12:00 p.m.	**Kent State**	No. 22/20 Penn State	Beaver Stadium • University Park, Pennsylvania	ESPN2	**L** 0–24	100,610	
September 18	12:00 p.m.	**Ohio**	No. 2/2 Ohio State	Ohio Stadium • Columbus, Ohio	Big Ten Network	**L** 7–43	105,075	
September 18	12:00 p.m.	**Northern Illinois**	Illinois	Memorial Stadium • Champaign, Illinois	Big Ten Network	**L** 22–28	50,569	
September 18	3:30 p.m.	Colorado State	**Miami University**	Yager Stadium • Oxford, Ohio	Ohio News Network	**W** 10–31	16,691	
September 18	4:00 p.m.	**Central Michigan**	**Eastern Michigan**	Rynearson Stadium • Ypsilanti, Michigan (Michigan MAC Trophy)		52–14	20,348	
September 18	7:00 p.m.	UCF	**Buffalo**	University at Buffalo Stadium • Amherst, New York	Time Warner Cable SportsNet	**L** 24–10	14,312	
September 18	7:00 p.m.	**Toledo**	**Western Michigan**	Waldo Stadium • Kalamazoo, Michigan		37–24	14,216	
September 18	7:00 p.m.	Marshall	**Bowling Green**	Doyt Perry Stadium • Bowling Green, Ohio	ESPN3.com	**W** 28–44	20,515	
September 18	7:00 p.m.	**Akron**	Kentucky	Commonwealth Stadium • Lexington, Kentucky	Fox Sports Net/ESPN GamePlan	**L** 10–47	64,014	
^{#}Rankings from AP / Coaches polls released prior to game. All times are in Eastern Time.

=== Week four ===
Date	Time	Visiting team	Home team	Site	TV	Result	Attendance	Ref.
September 25	12:00 pm	Buffalo	Connecticut	Rentschler Field • East Hartford, Connecticut	ESPN3	**L** 21–45	36,738	
September 25	12:00 pm	Central Michigan	Northwestern	Ryan Field • Evanston, Illinois		**L** 25–30	30,075	
September 25	12:00 pm	Bowling Green	No. 21/22 Michigan	Michigan Stadium • Ann Arbor, Michigan	ESPN2	**L** 21–65	109,933	
September 25	12:00 pm	Ball State	No. 18/18 Iowa	Kinnick Stadium • Iowa City, Iowa	Big Ten Network	**L** 0–45	70,585	
September 25	12:00 pm	Toledo	Purdue	Ross–Ade Stadium • West Lafayette, Indiana	Big Ten Network	**W** 31–20	42,068	
September 25	2:00 pm	Miami University	No. NR/24 Missouri	Faurot Field • Columbia, Missouri		**L** 13–51	60,329	
September 25	3:30 pm	Eastern Michigan	No. 2/2 Ohio State	Ohio Stadium • Columbus, Ohio	ABC	**L** 20–73	105,017	
September 25	3:30 pm	Temple	No. 23/20 Penn State	Beaver Stadium • University Park, Pennsylvania	Big Ten Network	**L** 13–22	104,840	
September 25	7:00 pm	Akron	Indiana	Memorial Stadium • Bloomington, Indiana	Big Ten Network	**L** 20–35	42,258	
September 25	7:00 pm	Ohio	Marshall	Edwards Stadium • Huntington, West Virginia (Battle for the Bell)		**L** 23–24	28,143	
September 25	8:30 pm	Northern Illinois	Minnesota	TCF Bank Stadium • Minneapolis, Minnesota	Big Ten Network	**W** 34–23	49,368	
^{#}Rankings from AP / Coaches polls released prior to game. All times are in Eastern Time.

Bye week: Kent State, Western Michigan

In week four, two MAC teams (Kent State, Western Michigan) took the week off, while the other eleven teams took to the road. Eight MAC teams visited Big Ten schools, bringing the total MAC versus Big Ten matches to thirteen for the year.

=== Week five ===
Date	Time	Visiting team	Home team	Site	TV	Result	Attendance	Ref.
October 2	12:00 pm	**Temple**	Army	Michie Stadium • West Point, New York		**W** 42–35	33,065	
October 2†	12:00 pm	**Ohio**	**Eastern Michigan**	Rynearson Stadium • Ypsilanti, Michigan		30–17	16,753	
October 2	1:00 pm	**Kent State**	**Miami University**	Yager Stadium • Oxford, Ohio		21–27	17,666	
October 2†	2:00 pm	Idaho	**Western Michigan**	Waldo Stadium • Kalamazoo, Michigan		**L** 33–13	18,508	
October 2	3:30 pm	**Buffalo**	**Bowling Green**	Doyt Perry Stadium • Bowling Green, Ohio		28–26	14,544	
October 2	3:30 pm	**Ball State**	**Central Michigan**	Kelly/Shorts Stadium • Mount Pleasant, Michigan		31–17	20,152	
October 2†	6:00 pm	**Northern Illinois**	**Akron**	InfoCision Stadium • Akron, Ohio		50–14	12,133	
October 2	7:00 pm	Wyoming	**Toledo**	Glass Bowl • Toledo, Ohio		**L** 20–15	20,843	
^{#}Rankings from AP / Coaches polls released prior to game. All times are in Eastern Time.

=== Week six ===
Date	Time	Visiting team	Home team	Site	TV	Result	Attendance	Ref.
October 9, 2010	12:00 pm	Central Michigan	Virginia Tech	Lane Stadium • Blacksburg, Virginia	ESPNU	**L** 21–45	66,233	
October 9, 2010	12:00 pm	Western Michigan	**Ball State**	Scheumann Stadium • Muncie, Indiana		45–16	11,962	
October 9, 2010	12:00 pm	Temple	**Northern Illinois**	Huskie Stadium • Dekalb, Illinois		17–31	14,011	
October 9, 2010	2:00 pm	Bowling Green	**Ohio**	Peden Stadium • Athens, Ohio		25–49	19,855	
October 9, 2010	3:30 pm	Akron	**Kent State**	Dix Stadium • Kent, Ohio	ESPN3	17–28	24,221	
October 9, 2010	7:00 pm	Eastern Michigan	Vanderbilt	Vanderbilt Stadium • Nashville, Tennessee	ESPNU	**L** 6–52	33,107	
October 9, 2010	7:00 pm	Miami University	Cincinnati	Nippert Stadium • Cincinnati	ESPN3	**L** 3–45	33,909	
October 9, 2010	8:00 pm	Toledo	Boise State	Bronco Stadium • Boise, Idaho		**L** 14–57	33,833	
^{#}Rankings from AP / Coaches polls released prior to game. All times are in Eastern Time.

For week 6, Buffalo had the week off.

=== Week seven ===
Date	Time	Visiting team	Home team	Site	TV	Result	Attendance	Ref.
October 16, 2010	12:00 pm	Miami University	**Central Michigan**	Kelly/Shorts Stadium • Mount Pleasant, Michigan		27–20	24,761	
October 16, 2010	1:00 pm	Bowling Green	**Temple**	Lincoln Financial Field • Philadelphia		27–28	23,045	
October 16, 2010	1:00 pm	Eastern Michigan	**Ball State**	Scheumann Stadium • Muncie, Indiana		41–38 ^{OT}	10,956	
October 16, 2010	2:00 pm	Akron	**Ohio**	Peden Stadium • Athens, Ohio		10–38	21,645	
October 16, 2010	2:30 pm	Western Michigan	Notre Dame	Notre Dame Stadium • South Bend, Indiana	NBC	**L** 20–44	80,795	
October 16, 2010	3:30 pm	Buffalo	**Northern Illinois**	Huskie Stadium • Dekalb, Illinois		14–45	21,230	
October 16, 2010	7:00 pm	Kent State	**Toledo**	Glass Bowl • Toledo, Ohio		21–34	20,048	
^{#}Rankings from AP / Coaches polls released prior to game. All times are in Eastern Time.

=== Week eight ===
Date	Time	Visiting team	Home team	Site	TV	Result	Attendance	Ref.
October 23	12:00 pm	Temple	**Buffalo**	University at Buffalo Stadium • Amherst, New York	ESPN3	42–0	13,371	
October 23	1:00 pm	Ohio	**Miami University**	Yager Stadium • Oxford, Ohio		34–13	17,144	
October 23	3:30 pm	Kent State	**Bowling Green**	Doyt Perry Stadium • Bowling Green, Ohio		30–6	14,279	
October 23	3:30 pm	Western Michigan	**Akron**	InfoCision Stadium • Akron, Ohio	ESPN3	56–10	10,073	
October 23	4:00 pm	Central Michigan	**Northern Illinois**	Huskie Stadium • Dekalb, Illinois	ESPN3	7–33	17,042	
October 23	6:00 pm	Eastern Michigan	Virginia	Scott Stadium • Charlottesville, Virginia	ESPN3	**L** 21–48	37,386	
October 23	7:00 pm	Ball State	**Toledo**	Glass Bowl • Toledo, Ohio		24–31	15,010	
^{#}Rankings from AP / Coaches polls released prior to game. All times are in Eastern Time.

=== Week nine ===
Date	Time	Visiting team	Home team	Site	TV	Result	Attendance	Ref.
October 30	12:00	**Northern Illinois**	Western Michigan	Waldo Stadium • Kalamazoo, Michigan	ESPN GamePlan ESPN3	28–21	12,578	
October 30	1:00	**Akron**	Temple	Lincoln Financial Field • Philadelphia		0–30	17,563	
October 30	2:00	LA-Lafayette	Ohio	Peden Stadium • Athens, Ohio		**W** 31–38	15,255	
October 30	3:30	**Miami University**	Buffalo	University at Buffalo Stadium • Amherst, New York	TWCS	21–9	12,786	
October 30	3:30	**Bowling Green**	Central Michigan	Kelly/Shorts Stadium • Mount Pleasant, Michigan		17–14	17,659	
October 30	3:30	**Ball State**	Kent State	Dix Stadium • Kent, Ohio	WJW (TV)	14–33	15,468	
October 30	4:00	**Toledo**	Eastern Michigan	Rynearson Stadium • Ypsilanti, Michigan	STO	42–7	25,860	
^{#}Rankings from AP / Coaches polls released prior to game. All times are in Eastern Time.

=== Week ten ===
Date	Time	Visiting team	Home team	Site	TV	Result	Attendance	Ref.
November 4	7:30	**Buffalo**	**Ohio**	Peden Stadium • Athens, Ohio	ESPNU	17–34	15,112	
November 5	6:00	**Western Michigan**	**Central Michigan**	Kelly/Shorts Stadium • Mount Pleasant, Michigan	ESPNU	22–26	22,355	
November 6	1:00	**Akron**	**Ball State**	Scheumann Stadium • Muncie, Indiana		30–37 ^{OT}	5,377	
November 6	2:00	**Temple**	**Kent State**	Dix Stadium • Kent, Ohio		28–10	15,125	
^{#}Rankings from AP / Coaches polls released prior to game. All times are in Eastern Time.

For week 10, Eastern Michigan, Northern Illinois, Toledo, Bowling Green, and Miami had the week off.

=== Week eleven ===
Date	Time	Visiting team	Home team	Site	TV	Result	Attendance	Ref.
November 9	7:00	**Toledo**	**Northern Illinois**	Huskie Stadium • Dekalb, Illinois	ESPN2	30–65	18,472	
November 10	8:00	**Miami University**	**Bowling Green**	Doyt Perry Stadium • Bowling Green, Ohio	ESPN 2	24–21	12,073	
November 12	6:00	**Ball State**	**Buffalo**	University at Buffalo Stadium • Amherst, New York	ESPN U	20–3	11,355	
November 13	2:00	Army	**Kent State**	Dix Stadium • Kent, Ohio		**L** 45–28	17,222	
November 13	2:00	**Eastern Michigan**	**Western Michigan**	Waldo Stadium • Kalamazoo, Michigan		30–45	12,136	
November 13	3:30	**Central Michigan**	Navy	Navy–Marine Corps Memorial Stadium • Annapolis, Maryland		**L** 37–38	34,333	
^{#}Rankings from AP / Coaches polls released prior to game. All times are in Eastern Time.

For week eleven, Ohio, Akron, and Temple had the week off.

=== Week twelve ===
Date	Time	Visiting team	Home team	Site	TV	Result	Attendance	Ref.
November 16	8:00	Ohio	Temple	Lincoln Financial Field • Philadelphia	ESPN2	31–23	16,433	
November 17	6:00/ 8:00	Miami University	Akron	InfoCision Stadium • Akron, Ohio	ESPN 2 or ESPNU	19–14	7,671	
November 17	6:00/ 8:00	Bowling Green	Toledo	Glass Bowl • Toledo, Ohio (Battle of I-75)	ESPN 2 or ESPN U	14–33	22,071	
November 20	1:00	Northern Illinois	Ball State	Scheumann Stadium • Muncie, Indiana (Bronze Stalk Trophy)		59–21	5,524	
November 20	2:00	Eastern Michigan	Buffalo	University at Buffalo Stadium • Amherst, New York	STO	21–17	9,786	
November 20	2:00	Kent State	Western Michigan	Waldo Stadium • Kalamazoo, Michigan		3–38	8,763	
^{#}Rankings from AP / Coaches polls released prior to game. All times are in Eastern Time.

For week twelve, Central Michigan had the week off.

With their win over Ball State, Northern Illinois clinched the West Division championship and a berth to the MAC Championship Game; the Huskies were one game ahead of the next team (Toledo) with one game remaining, and would win a tie-breaker based on their earlier defeat of the Rockets.

=== Week thirteen ===
Date	Time	Visiting team	Home team	Site	TV	Result	Attendance	Ref.
November 23	7:00	Temple	Miami University	Yager Stadium • Oxford, Ohio	ESPN2	3–23	13,235	
November 26	11:00	Ohio	Kent State	Dix Stadium • Kent, Ohio	ESPN U	6–28	8,340	
November 26	12:00	Northern Illinois	Eastern Michigan	Rynearson Stadium • Ypsilanti, Michigan	ESPNU	71–3	5,147	
November 26	2:00	Western Michigan	Bowling Green	Doyt Perry Stadium • Bowling Green, Ohio	ESPN U	41–7	5,121	
November 26	2:00	Buffalo	Akron	InfoCision Stadium • Akron, Ohio	ESPN U	14–22	5,216	
November 26	2:00	Central Michigan	Toledo	Glass Bowl • Toledo, Ohio	ESPN U	31–42	12,121	
^{#}Rankings from AP / Coaches polls released prior to game. All times are in Eastern Time.

Ball State did not play in week 13; the Cardinals' final game was on November 20.

With their win over Temple, Miami secured a 7–1 conference record, but because the RedHawks lost to Ohio earlier in the season, they did not win the East Division until the Bobcats lost to Kent State three days later.

=== MAC Championship ===
Date	Time	Visiting team	Home team	Site	TV	Result	Attendance	Ref.
December 3	7:00	**Miami University**	**#23 Northern Illinois**	Ford Field • Detroit, Michigan	ESPN2	26–21	12,031	
^{#}Rankings from AP / Coaches polls released prior to game. All times are in Eastern Time.

== Bowl games ==
Bowl	Date	Opponents	Winner	Score	Loser	Score	Location	Time	Network	Notes
New Orleans Bowl	December 18, 2010	Troy vs. Ohio	Troy	48	Ohio	21	New Orleans, Louisiana	6:30 p.m. CT	ESPN	
Humanitarian Bowl	December 18, 2010	Fresno State vs. Northern Illinois	Northern Illinois	40	Fresno State	17	Boise, Idaho	8:30 p.m. ET	ESPN	
Little Caesars Pizza Bowl	December 26, 2010	FIU vs. Toledo	FIU	34	Toledo	32	Detroit, Michigan	8:30 p.m. ET	ESPN	
GoDaddy.com Bowl	January 6, 2011	Middle Tennessee vs. Miami	Miami	35	Middle Tennessee	21	Mobile, Alabama	8:00 p.m. ET	ESPN	

== Records against other conferences ==
The following summarizes MAC performance against other conferences.

Conference	Wins	Losses
ACC	0	3
Big 12	0	3
Big East	1	3
Big South	0	2
Big Ten	2	11
Colonial Athletic	2	0
Conference USA	1	3
Great West	1	0
MEAC	1	0
Independents	1	4
Mountain West	1	1
Ohio Valley	2	0
Pac-10	0	1
SEC	0	3
Southern	1	0
Southland	1	0
Sun Belt	1	1
WAC	0	2
Overall	15	35

=== MAC vs. AQ matchups ===
During the season, MAC teams played several games against AQ conference opponents. Some of these games are regularly contested rivalry games.

Date	Visitor	Home	Significance	Winning team
September 2	Northern Illinois	Iowa State		Iowa State
September 3	Arizona	Toledo		Arizona
September 4	Western Michigan	Michigan State		Michigan State
September 4	Miami University	Florida		Florida
September 4	Syracuse	Akron		Syracuse
September 11	Kent State	Boston College		Boston College
September 11	Buffalo	Baylor		Baylor
September 18	Connecticut	Temple		Temple
September 18	Ball State	Purdue		Purdue
September 18	Kent State	Penn State		Penn State
September 18	Ohio	Ohio State		Ohio State
September 18	Northern Illinois	Illinois		Illinois
September 18	Akron	Kentucky		Kentucky
September 25	Buffalo	Connecticut		Connecticut
September 25	Central Michigan	Northwestern		Northwestern
September 25	Bowling Green	Michigan		Michigan
September 25	Ball State	Iowa		Iowa
September 25	Toledo	Purdue		Toledo
September 25	Miami University	Missouri		Missouri
September 25	Eastern Michigan	Ohio State		Ohio State
September 25	Temple	Penn State		Penn State
September 25	Akron	Indiana		Indiana
September 25	Northern Illinois	Minnesota		Northern Illinois
October 9	Central Michigan	Virginia Tech		Virginia Tech
October 9	Eastern Michigan	Vanderbilt		Vanderbilt
October 9	Miami University	Cincinnati		Cincinnati
October 16	Western Michigan	Notre Dame		Notre Dame
October 23	Eastern Michigan	Virginia		Virginia
November 13	Army	Kent State		Army
November 13	Central Michigan	Navy		Navy

== Players of the week ==
Throughout the regular season, the Mid-American Conference offices name offensive, defensive and special teams players of the week for each division. Several players won multiple awards: Matt Rinehart from Kent State was the East Division Special Teams Player of the Week three times ( week 6,9 and 10). Chandler Harnish from Northern Illinois was the West Division Offensive Player of the Week three times(week 5,6 and 11) Paul Hershey from Ohio was the East Division Special Teams Player of the Week twice (week 3 and week 4), Muhammad Wilkerson from Temple was the East Division Defensive Player of the Week twice (week 2 and week 8), Freddy Cortez from Kent State was the East Division Special Teams Player of the Week twice (week 2 and week 8), Nick Harwell from Ball State was the East Division Offensive player of the week twice ( week 9 and week 11), Dwayne Woods from Bowling Green was named East Division Defensive player of the week twice (week 3 and week 11), Trevor Cook from Miami was named East Division Special Teams player of the week twice (week 5 and week 11), Ian McGarvey from Ball State was named West Division Special Teams player of the week twice (week 10 and week 11)and Dwayne Priest of Eastern Michigan was named West Division Offensive player of the week twice (week 1 and week 12). Through week 12, only Akron has failed to produce a Player of the Week.

Week	East Division						West Division					
Week	Offensive		Defensive		Special teams		Offensive		Defensive		Special teams	
Week	Player	Team	Player	Team	Player	Team	Player	Team	Player	Team	Player	Team
Week 1	Spencer Keith	Kent State	Keith Morgan	Bowling Green	Brandon McManus	Temple	Dwayne Priest	Eastern Michigan	Nick Bellore	Central Michigan	Ben Armer	Western Michigan
Week 2	Thomas Merriweather	Miami	Muhammad Wilkerson	Temple	Freddy Cortez	Kent State	Alex Carder	Western Michigan	Dan Molls	Toledo	Jay Karutz	Eastern Michigan
Week 3	Bernard Pierce	Temple	Dwayne Woods	Bowling Green	Paul Hershey	Ohio	Paris Cotton	Central Michigan	Desmond Marrow	Toledo	Josh Wilber	Northern Illinois
Week 4	Terrence McCrae	Ohio	Jaiquawn Jarrett	Temple	Paul Hershey	Ohio	Chad Spann	Northern Illinois	Archie Donald	Toledo	Jimmie Ward	Northern Illinois
Week 5	Matt Brown	Temple	Khalil Mack	Buffalo	Trevor Cook	Miami	Chandler Harnish	Northern Illinois	Robert Eddins	Ball State	Ben Armer	Western Michigan
Week 6	Phil Bates	Ohio	Roosevelt Nix	Kent State	Matt Rinehart	Kent State	Chandler Harnish	Northern Illinois	Lewis Toler	Western Michigan	John Potter	Western Michigan
Week 7	Boo Jackson	Ohio	Evan Harris	Miami	Adrian Robinson	Temple	Alex Gillett	Eastern Michigan	T.J. Fatinikun	Toledo	Jimmie Ward	Northern Illinois
Week 8	Tyshon Goode	Kent State	Muhammad Wilkerson	Temple	Freddy Cortez	Kent State	Juan Nunez	Western Michigan	Tyrone Clark	Northern Illinois	Isaiah Ballard	Toledo
Week 9	Nick Harwell	Miami	Chris Jones	Bowling Green	Matt Rinehart	Kent State	Jordan White	Western Michigan	Jake Coffman	Northern Illinois	Vince Penza	Toledo
Week 10	Mike Gerardi	Toledo	Stafford Gatling	Ohio	Matt Rinehart	Kent State	Jack Tomlinson	Ball State	Armond Staten	Central Michigan	Ian McGarvey	Ball State
Week 11	Nick Harwell	Miami	Dwayne Woods	Bowling Green	Trevor Cook	Miami	Chandler Harnish	Northern Illinois	Sean Baker	Ball State	Ian McGarvey	Ball State
Week 12	Vince Davidson	Ohio	Brandon Stephens	Miami	Eugene Cooper	Bowling Green	Dwayne Priest	Eastern Michigan	Jamail Berry	Western Michigan	Jordan Delegal	Northern Illinois

== Statistics ==
=== Team ===
Scoring Offense
Team	G	PTS	AVG
Northern Illinois	12	471	39.2
Western Michigan	12	388	32.3
Ohio	12	336	28.0
Toledo	12	331	27.6

Scoring Defense
Team	G	PTS	AVG
Northern Illinois	12	222	18.5
Temple	12	229	19.1
Ohio	12	261	21.8
Kent State	12	275	22.9

Passing Offense
Team	ATT	YDS	TD	YDS/G
Western Michigan	475	3429	30	285.8
Central Michigan	477	3408	17	284.0
Miami	420	2921	16	243.4
Bowling Green	459	2779	12	231.6

Rushing Offense
Team	ATT	YDS	TD	YDS/G
Northern Illinois	521	3350	38	279.2
Eastern Michigan	511	2080	17	173.3
Ohio	466	2030	25	169.2
Toledo	452	1872	19	156.0

Total Offense
Team	RUSH	PASS	TOTAL	TD	YDS/G
Northern Illinois	3350	2074	5424	57	452.0
Western Michigan	1511	3429	4940	48	411.7
Central Michigan	1269	3408	4677	35	389.8
Toledo	1872	2442	4314	41	359.5

Passing Defense
Team	ATT	YDS	TD	YDS/G
Temple	357	2138	9	178.2
Buffalo	325	2177	20	181.4
Northern Illinois	364	2294	12	191.2
Central Michigan	360	2461	16	205.1

Rushing Defense
Team	ATT	YDS	TD	YDS/G
Kent State	434	1166	21	97.2
Ohio	425	1380	15	115.0
Miami	384	1486	25	123.8
Toledo	401	1567	25	130.6

Total Defense
Team	RUSH	PASS	TOTAL	TD	YDS/G
Kent State	1166	2514	3680	31	306.7
Temple	1674	2138	3812	25	217.6
Northern Illinois	1598	2294	324.3	25	324.3
Ohio	1380	2612	3992	32	332.7
Miami	1486	2506	3992	36	332.7

3rd Downs
Team	CONV	ATT	PCT
Northern Illinois	78	151	51.7
Toledo	71	175	40.6
Western Michigan	73	183	39.9
Central Michigan	64	171	37.4

Opp. 3rd Downs
Team	CONV	ATT	PCT
Miami	56	156	35.9
Northern Illinois	59	162	36.4
Kent State	69	186	37.1
Buffalo	73	200	37.2

Red Zone Offense
Team	ATT	TD	FG	TOTAL	PCT
Ohio	41	31	5	36	87.8
Northern Illinois	59	37	13	50	84.7
Temple	39	23	8	31	79.5
Ball State	37	18	11	29	78.4
Toledo	37	24	5	29	78.4

Red Zone Defense
Team	ATT	TD	FG	TOTAL	PCT
Miami	40	23	5	28	70.0
Northern Illinois	29	14	7	21	72.4
Toledo	48	28	7	35	72.9
Western Michigan	38	18	10	28	73.7
Temple	38	19	9	28	73.7

Turnover Margin
Team	GAIN	LOSS	DIFF
Toledo	33	11	+ 14
Northern Illinois	24	13	+ 11
Miami	29	22	+ 7
Western Michigan	30	27	+ 3

Penalties
Team	NO.	YDS	AVG/G
Northern Illinois	54	507	42.2
Akron	66	561	46.8
Ohio	68	571	47.6
Miami	71	583	48.6

=== Individual ===
Passing
Player	School	COMP	ATT	YDS	TD	INT	YPG
Ryan Radcliff	Central Michigan	282	466	3358	17	17	279.8
Alex Carder	Western Michigan	289	458	3334	30	12	277.8
Zac Dysert	Miami	222	342	2406	13	12	240.6
Matt Schilz	Bowling Green	228	377	2223	8	14	222.3

Rushing
Player	School	ATT	YDS	YPC	TD	YPG
Chad Spann	Northern Illinois	226	1239	5.5	20	103.2
Dwayne Priest	Eastern Michigan	168	716	4.3	8	79.6
Adonis Thomas	Toledo	151	905	6.0	6	75.4
Alex Allen	Akron	186	877	4.7	8	73.1

Receiving
Player	School	REC	YDS	YPC	TD	YPG
Jordan White	Western Michigan	94	1378	14.7	10	114.8
Cody Wilson	Central Michigan	83	1137	13.7	5	94.8
Kamar Jordan	Bowling Green	96	1109	11.6	4	92.4
Eric Page	Toledo	94	1081	11.5	8	90.1

Tackles
Player	School	SOLO	AST	TOTAL	AVG/G
Archie Donald	Toledo	54	80	134	11.2
Dwayne Woods	Bowling Green	50	84	134	11.2
Dan Molls	Toledo	33	100	133	11.1
Brian Wagner	Akron	65	65	130	10.8

Sacks
Player	School	SACKS	YARDS
Roosevelt Nix	Kent State	10.0	88
Muhammad Wilkerson	Temple	9.5	75
Paul Hazel	Western Michigan	8.0	56
Shawn Lemon	Akron	7.0	46

Interceptions
Player	School	INT	YARDS	TD
Sean Baker	Ball State	6	54	0
Domonic Cook	Buffalo	6	33	0
Evan Harris	Miami	5	114	1
Donovan Fletcher	Ohio	5	79	1
Mario Armstrong	Western Michigan	5	43	0
Lewis Toler	Western Michigan	5	29	1
Norman Wolfe	Kent Stat	5	23	0

Kick returns
Player	School	RET	YDS	TD	AVG	LONG
Eric Page	Toledo	25	794	3	31.8	99
Eric Williams	Ball State	29	740	1	25.5	92
James Nixon	Temple	24	561	0	23.4	51
Corey Welch	Eastern Michigan	33	688	0	20.8	33

Punt returns
Player	School	RET	YDS	TD	AVG	LONG

Kicking
Player	School	PAT	FG	PTS	PTS/G
Michael Cklamovski	Northern Illinois	48–53	15–25	93	7.8
John Potter	Western Michigan	50–50	10–12	80	6.7
Ian McGarvey	Ball State	29–30	14–17	71	6.5
Trevor Cook	Miami	18–19	16–21	66	6.0

== Attendance ==
Team	Stadium	Capacity	Game 1	Game 2	Game 3	Game 4	Game 5	Game 6	Total	Average	% of Capacity
Temple	Lincoln Financial Field	68,532	32,193	15,152	18,702	23,045	17,563	16,433	123,008	20,515	29.9
Central Michigan	Kelly/Shorts Stadium	30,295	17,311	20,152	24,761	17,659	22,355	—	102,238	20,448	67.5
Toledo	Glass Bowl	26,248	25,907	20,843	20,048	15,010	22,071	12,121	116,000	19,333	73.7
Ohio	Peden Stadium	24,000	22,955	19,455	19,855	21,645	15,255	15,112	114,277	19,047	79.3
Northern Illinois	Huskie Stadium	30,076	18,046	14,011	21,230	17,042	18,472	—	88,801	17,760	59.1
Kent State	Dix Stadium	27,363	16,535	24,221	15,468	15,125	17,222	8,340	96,916	16,153	59.0
Eastern Michigan	Rynearson Stadium	30,200	11,318	20,348	16,753	25,860	5,147	—	79,426	15,886	52.6
Miami	Yager Stadium	24,286	12,857	16,691	17,666	17,144	13,235	—	77,593	15,519	63.9
Western Michigan	Waldo Stadium	30,200	19,327	14,216	18,508	12,578	12,136	8,763	85,528	14,255	47.2
Bowling Green	Doyt Perry Stadium	23,724	20,515	14,544	14,279	12,073	5,121	—	66,532	13,307	56.1
Buffalo	UB Stadium	29,013	16,273	14,312	13,371	12,786	11,355	9,786	77,883	12,981	44.7
Akron	InfoCision Stadium	27,881	15,969	10,046	12,133	10,073	7,671	5,216	61,108	10,185	36.5
Ball State	Scheumann Stadium	25,400	10,753	9,110	11,963	10,956	5,377	5,524	53,683	8,948	35.2

== 2010 MAC Specialty Award Winners ==
Vern Smith Leadership Award Winner: Chad Spann, Northern Illinois
Coach of the Year: Michael Haywood, Miami
Offensive Player of the Year: Chad Spann, Northern Illinois
Defensive Player of the Year: Roosevelt Nix, Kent State
Special Teams Player of the Year: Eric Page, Toledo
Freshman of the Year: Roosevelt Nix, Kent State

== All-Conference teams ==
2010 All-MAC First Team Offense
Quarterback – Chandler Harnish, Northern Illinois
Center – Scott Wedige, Northern Illinois
Offensive Lineman – Trevor Olson, Northern Illinois
Offensive Linemen – Colin Madison, Temple
Offensive Linemen – Darius Morris, Temple
Offensive Lineman – Joe Flading, Ohio
Tight End – Evan Rodriguez, Temple
Wide Receiver – Juan Nunez, Western Michigan
Wide Receiver – Eric Page, Toledo
Wide Receiver – Jordan White, Western Michigan
Wide Receiver – Kamar Jorden, Bowling Green
Running Back – Chad Spann, Northern Illinois
Running Back – Bernard Pierce, Temple
Placekicker – Trevor Cook, Miami

2010 All-MAC First Team Defense
Outside Linebacker – Adrian Robinson, Temple
Outside Linebacker – Matt Berning, Central Michigan
Inside Linebacker – Nick Bellore, Central Michigan
Inside Linebacker – Cobrani Mixon, Kent State
Down Lineman – Muhammad Wilkerson, Temple
Down Lineman – Roosevelt Nix, Kent State
Down Lineman – Sean Progar-Jackson, Northern Illinois
Down Lineman – Elisha Joseph, Temple
Defensive Back – Davonte Shannon, Buffalo
Defensive Back – Jaiquawn Jarrett, Temple
Defensive Back – Domonic Cook, Buffalo
Defensive Back – Chris Smith, Northern Illinois
Punter – Matt Rinehart, Kent State

2010 All-MAC First Team Specialists
Kickoff Return Specialist – Eric Page, Toledo
Punt Return Specialist – Terrell Jackson, Buffalo

2010 All-MAC Second Team Offense
Quarterback – Zac Dysert, Miami
Center – Colin Miller, Central Michigan
Offensive Lineman – Joe Pawlak, Northern Illinois
Offensive Lineman – Brandon Brooks, Miami
Offensive Lineman – Jeff Maddux, Central Michigan
Offensive Lineman – A.J. Strum, Ohio
Tight End – Jordan Thompson, Ohio
Wide Receiver – Armand Robinson, Miami
Wide Receiver – Cody Wilson, Central Michigan
Wide Receiver – Nick Harwell, Miami
Wide Receiver – Tyshon Goode, Kent State
Running Back – Adonis Thomas, Toledo
Running Back – Matt Brown, Temple
Placekicker – Ian McGarvey, Ball State

2010 All-MAC Second Team Defense
Outside Linebacker – Archie Donald, Toledo
Outside Linebacker – Robert Eddins, Ball State
Inside Linebacker – Elijah 'Peanut' Joseph, Temple
Inside Linebacker – Dwayne Woods, Bowling Green
Down Lineman – Stafford Gatling, Ohio
Down Lineman – Austin Brown, Miami
Down Lineman – Shawn Lemon, Akron
Down Lineman – Jake Coffman, Northern Illinois
Defensive Back – Steven Jackson, Ohio
Defensive Back – Donovan Fletcher, Ohio
Defensive Back – Brian Lainhart, Kent State
Defensive Back – Sean Baker, Ball State
Punter – Bryan Wright, Bowling Green

2010 All-MAC Second Team Specialists
Kickoff Return Specialist – Eric Williams, Ball State
Punt Return Specialist – Eugene Cooper, Bowling Green

2010 All-MAC Third Team Offense
Quarterback – Alex Carder, Western Michigan
Center – Chris Anzevino, Kent State
Offensive Lineman – Michael Switzer, Ball State
Offensive Lineman – Mike VanDerMeulen, Toledo
Offensive Lineman – Brian Winters, Kent State
Offensive Lineman – Bob Gulley, Miami
Tight End – Jason Schepler, Northern Illinois
Wide Receiver – Michael Campbell, Temple
Wide Receiver – Sam Kirkland, Kent State
Wide Receiver – Landon Cox, Northern Illinois
Wide Receiver – Terrence McCrae, Ohio
Running Back – Eric Williams, Ball State
Running Back – Willie Geter, Bowling Green
Placekicker – John Potter, Western Michigan

2010 All-MAC Third Team Defense
Outside Linebacker – Alex Kube, Northern Illinois
Outside Linebacker – Dorian Wood, Kent State
Inside Linebacker – Devon Butler, Northern Illinois
Inside Linebacker – Dan Molls, Toledo
Down Lineman – Sean Murnane, Central Michigan
Down Lineman – Paul Hazel, Western Michigan
Down Lineman – Chris Jones, Bowling Green
Down Lineman – T.J. Fatinikun, Toledo
Defensive Back – Jahleel Addae, Central Michigan
Defensive Back – Vince Agnew, Central Michigan
Defensive Back – Jason Pinkston, Ball State
Defensive Back – Jamail Berry, Western Michigan
Punter – Zac Murphy, Miami

2010 All-MAC Third Team Specialists
Kickoff Return Specialist – Tommy Davis, Northern Illinois
Punt Return Specialist – Cody Wilson, Central Michigan

== 2011 NFL draft ==
Prospects from the MAC who were all invited to the NFL Combine:

- LB Nick Bellore, Central Michigan
- FS Jaiquawn Jarrett, Temple
- LB Elijah "Peanut" Joseph, Temple
- CB Josh Thomas, Buffalo
- DT Muhammad Wilkerson, Temple

On April 28, DT Muhammad Wilkerson, a junior from Temple, was selected by the New York Jets near the end of the first round of the draft, with the 30th overall pick.
