= Tahir Whitehead =

American football player (born 1990)

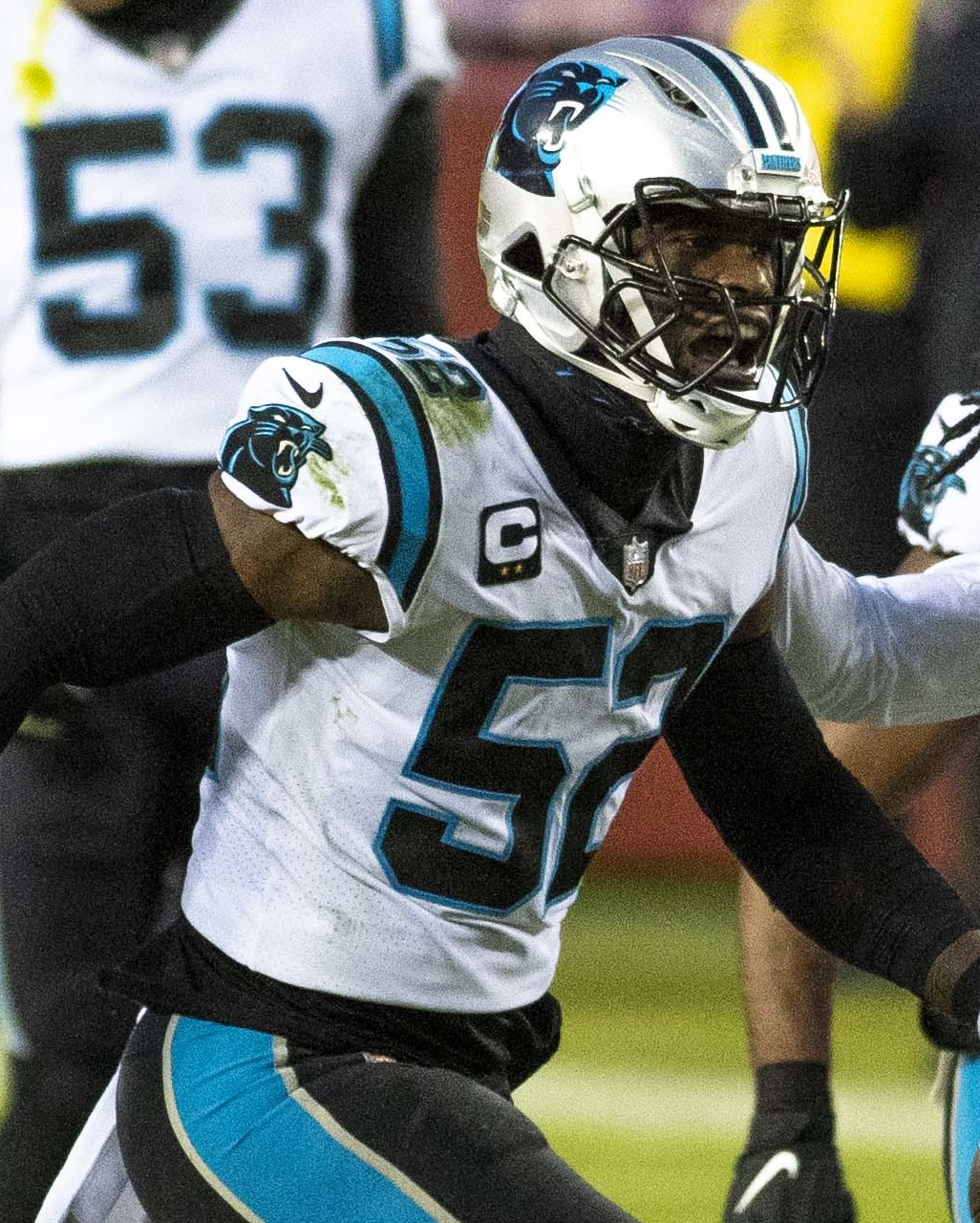
- Whitehead with the Carolina Panthers in 2020

No. 59, 52, 35
- Position: Linebacker

Personal information
- Born: April 2, 1990 (age 36); Jersey City, New Jersey, U.S.
- Listed height: 6 ft 1 in (1.85 m)
- Listed weight: 228 lb (103 kg)

Career information
- High school: West Side (Newark, New Jersey)
- College: Temple (2008–2011)
- NFL draft: 2012: 5th round, 138th overall pick

Career history
- Detroit Lions (2012–2017); Oakland Raiders (2018–2019); Carolina Panthers (2020); Arizona Cardinals (2021)

Awards and highlights
- Second-team All-MAC (2011)

Career NFL statistics
- Total tackles: 685
- Sacks: 3.0
- Forced fumbles: 3
- Fumble recoveries: 6
- Interceptions: 6
- Pass deflections: 25
- Stats at Pro Football Reference

Tahir Ali Whitehead (born April 2, 1990) is an American former professional football player who was a linebacker in the National Football League (NFL). He played college football for the Temple Owls and was selected by the Detroit Lions of the National Football League (NFL) in the fifth round of the 2012 NFL draft. He also played for the Oakland Raiders, Carolina Panthers, and Arizona Cardinals.

== Early life ==
A native of Newark, New Jersey, Whitehead played high school football at West Side High School, where he was part of the team that won the 2007 state sectional championship.

== College career ==
Whitehead played four years for Temple from 2008 through 2011. After primarily playing on special teams as a freshman and sophomore, Whitehead carved out a starting role in the 2010 season and finished sixth on an 8–4 Temple team with 56 tackles, including 7.5 tackles for a loss. As a senior in 2011, Whitehead had 70 tackles, five sacks, and 13.5 tackles-for-loss for a Temple team that went 9–4 and won a bowl game for the first time since 1979. Whitehead was named a Second Team All-MAC selection following the season.

== Professional career ==
=== Pre-draft ===
Whitehead attended the NFL Scouting Combine in Indianapolis, Indiana and completed all of the combine drills. On March 16, 2012, he attended Temple's pro day and opted to run all of the combine drills for the scouts and team representatives. He posted faster times in the short shuttle, 40-yard dash, 20-yard dash, and three-cone drill. At the conclusion of the pre-draft process, Whitehead was projected to be a sixth- or seventh-round pick. He was ranked as the 21st-best outside linebacker prospect in the draft by NFLDraftScout.com.

Pre-draft measurables
Height	Weight	Arm length	Hand span	40-yard dash	10-yard split	20-yard split	20-yard shuttle	Three-cone drill	Vertical jump	Broad jump	Bench press
6 ft 1 1/4 in (1.86 m)	233 lb (106 kg)	32 3/8 in (0.82 m)	10 1/4 in (0.26 m)	4.68 s	1.56 s	2.60 s	4.16 s	7.14 s	37 in (0.94 m)	10 ft 7 in (3.23 m)	21 reps
All values from NFL Combine/Pro Day

=== Detroit Lions ===
==== 2012 ====
The Detroit Lions selected Whitehead in the fifth round (138th overall) of the 2012 NFL draft. The Lions traded their seventh-round pick (219th overall) in the 2012 NFL Draft and their fourth-round pick (102nd overall) in the 2013 NFL draft to the Minnesota Vikings for their fifth-round pick (138th overall) and seventh-round pick (223rd overall) in 2012. Whitehead was the 18th linebacker selected in 2012 and was one of three Temple players, joining Bernard Pierce and Evan Rodriguez.

On March 10, 2012, the Lions signed Whitehead to a four-year, $2.31 million contract that included a signing bonus of $212,000.

Throughout training camp, Whitehead competed for the backup linebacker role against Doug Hogue. Head coach Jim Schwartz named Whitehead the backup outside linebacker behind Justin Durant, DeAndre Levy, and Doug Hogue to start the regular season.

On September 16, 2012, Whitehead made his professional regular season debut and made one solo tackle and a forced fumble during a 27–19 loss at the San Francisco 49ers. His first career tackle and forced fumble came as he was covering a kick return and tackled Kendall Hunter. He caused a Hunter to fumble and the ball was recovered by Kassim Osgood in the first quarter. In Week 10, he made a season-high two solo tackles in a 34–24 loss at the Minnesota Vikings. He appeared mainly on special teams during his rookie season and finished with a total of 11 combined tackles (eight solo) and a forced fumble in 14 games and zero starts.

==== 2013 ====
Whitehead returned to training camp in 2013 and competed against Ashlee Palmer, Travis Lewis, and Rocky McIntosh for the starting outside linebacker role that was left vacant after the departure of Justin Durant to the Dallas Cowboys in free agency. Head coach Jim Shwartz named him the backup to Ashlee Palmer and DeAndre Levy to start the regular season.

He played in the Detroit Lions' season-opener and assisted on one tackle in their 34-24 victory over the Minnesota Vikings. On September 29, 2013, he recorded a season-high two solo tackled during a 40-32 victory over the Chicago Bears. He finished the 2013 season with nine combined tackles (seven solo) in 16 games and appeared solely on special teams. Whitehead didn't play a single snap on defense in his first two seasons.

==== 2014 ====
Throughout training camp, Whitehead competed for the job as the outside linebacker against Kyle Van Noy and Ashlee Palmer. New head coach Jim Caldwell named Whitehead the starting strongside linebacker to start the 2014 regular season.

He earned his first career start in the Detroit Lions' season-opener against the New York Giants and made one solo tackle in the 35–14 victory. On September 28, 2014, Whitehead earned his first start at middle linebacker after Stephen Tulloch tore his ACL while celebrating a sack the previous week. He recorded a season-high 12 combined tackles in the Lions' 24–17 win at the New York Jets and remained the starting middle linebacker for the rest of the season. On October 12, 2014, Whitehead made seven combined tackles, deflected two passes, and made two interceptions off of Minnesota Vikings' quarterback Teddy Bridgewater as the Lions won, 17–3. It marked his first career interception. In Week 15, he made ten combined tackles in a 16–14 victory at the Minnesota Vikings. Whitehead finished the 2014 season with 86 combined tackles (63 solo), two interceptions and five pass deflections in 16 games and 15 starts.

The Detroit Lions finished second in the NFC North with an 11–5 record and received a playoff berth. On January 4, 2015, Whitehead started his first career playoff game and made six combined tackles and made his first career sack on quarterback Tony Romo in the Lions' 24–20 loss in the NFC Wildcard game at the Dallas Cowboys. Whitehead was ranked the 14th-best inside linebacker by Pro Football Focus for 2014.

==== 2015 ====
Whitehead competed with Stephen Tulloch for the starting middle linebacker role after he was impressive while replacing him in 2014. Head coach Jim Caldwell named Whitehead the backup middle linebacker behind Tulloch, with Travis Lewis and DeAndre Levy as the starting outside linebackers.

On September 20, 2015, he made four combined tackles in the Lions' 26–16 victory against the Minnesota Vikings. In Week 10, Whitehead made his first start of the season, replacing Travis Lewis at outside linebacker, and recorded eight combined tackles, deflected a pass, and sacked Aaron Rodgers during an 18–16 victory at the Green Bay Packers. On January 3, 2015, he collected six combined tackles, deflected a pass, made a sack, and intercepted a pass attempt by Chicago Bears' quarterback Jay Cutler in the Lions' 24–20 victory. Whitehead finished with 50 combined tackles (39 solo), a career-high two sacks, one interception, one fumble recovery, and a career-high six pass defenses. He played in 16 games and started the last eight at outside linebacker.

==== 2016 ====
On March 10, 2016, the Detroit Lions signed Whitehead to a two-year, $8 million contract that includes $4.75 million guaranteed and a signing bonus of $3 million.

Whitehead entered training camp slated as the starting middle linebacker after Stephen Tulloch departed during the offseason.

He started the Detroit Lions' season-opener at the Indianapolis Colts and made ten combined tackles and two pass deflections in their 39–35 victory. On October 9, 2016, Whitehead recorded a season-high 12 combined tackles and defended two passes during a 24–23 win against the Philadelphia Eagles. In Week 12, he collected 12 combined tackles for the fourth time in 2016 during the Lions' 22–16 win at the Minnesota Vikings. Whitehead missed the Lions' Week 13 victory at the New Orleans Saints after suffering a knee injury. Whitehead had a breakout 2016 season and finished with a career-high 132 combined tackles (99 solo) and five pass deflections in 15 games and 15 starts. His 132 tackles ranked ninth in the NFL in 2016.

==== 2017 ====
Whitehead started the 2017 season at weakside linebacker after the Detroit Lions selected Jarrad Davis is the first round (21st overall) of the 2017 NFL draft and anointed him starting middle linebacker.

On September 18, 2017, Whitehead recorded eight combined tackles, a pass deflection, and an interception on Eli Manning as the Lions defeated the New York Giants 24-10 on Monday Night Football. The interception set up the Lions' offense on an eventual touchdown scoring drive. On November 23, 2017, he collected a season-high 13 combined tackles in a 30-23 loss to the Minnesota Vikings. In Week 9, Whitehead recorded five solo tackle and a sack during a 30-17 win at the Green Bay Packers. He finished the 2017 season with 120 combined tackles (78 solo), two pass deflections, a sack, and an interception in 16 games and 16 starts. The Detroit Lions finished second in the NFC North with a 9-7 record and head coach Jim Caldwell was fired at the end of the season.

=== Oakland Raiders ===
On March 15, 2018, the Oakland Raiders signed Whitehead to a three-year, $19 million contract that includes $6.27 million guaranteed.

On March 9, 2020, Whitehead was released by the Raiders.

=== Carolina Panthers ===
On March 23, 2020, Whitehead signed a one-year contract with the Carolina Panthers. He played in 14 games with nine starts recording 51 tackles, which was seventh on the team.

=== Arizona Cardinals ===
On November 2, 2021, Whitehead was signed to the Arizona Cardinals practice squad. He was released on January 11, 2022.

=== Retirement ===
On September 9, 2022, Whitehead signed a one-day contract with the Detroit Lions to officially retire with the team.

== NFL career statistics ==
Legend
**Bold**	Career high

=== Regular season ===
Year	Team	Games		Tackles					Interceptions					Fumbles			
Year	Team	GP	GS	Cmb	Solo	Ast	Sck	TFL	Int	Yds	TD	Lng	PD	FF	FR	Yds	TD
2012	DET	14	0	11	8	3	0.0	0	0	0	0	0	0	**1**	0	0	0
2013	DET	**16**	0	9	7	2	0.0	0	0	0	0	0	0	**1**	0	0	0
2014	DET	**16**	15	86	63	23	0.0	4	**2**	2	0	2	5	0	0	0	0
2015	DET	**16**	8	51	40	11	**2.0**	7	1	**26**	0	**26**	**6**	0	1	0	0
2016	DET	15	15	**132**	**99**	33	0.0	3	0	0	0	0	5	0	0	0	0
2017	DET	**16**	**16**	110	78	32	1.0	**9**	1	18	0	18	2	0	**4**	9	0
2018	OAK	**16**	**16**	126	89	**37**	0.0	**9**	1	0	0	0	5	**1**	0	0	0
2019	OAK	**16**	**16**	108	79	29	0.0	6	0	0	0	0	1	0	0	0	0
2020	CAR	14	9	51	27	24	0.0	0	1	0	0	0	1	0	1	**10**	0
2021	ARI	3	0	1	0	1	0.0	0	0	0	0	0	0	0	0	0	0
Total		142	95	685	490	195	3.0	38	6	46	0	26	25	3	6	19	0

=== Postseason ===
Years	Team	Games		Tackles					Interceptions					Fumbles			
Years	Team	GP	GS	Cmb	Solo	Ast	Sck	TFL	Int	Yds	TD	Lng	PD	FF	FR	Yds	TD
2014	DET	**1**	**1**	6	**6**	0	**1.0**	**1**	0	0	0	0	0	0	0	0	0
2016	DET	**1**	**1**	**14**	3	**11**	0.0	0	0	0	0	0	0	0	0	0	0
Total		2	2	20	9	11	1.0	1	0	0	0	0	0	0	0	0	0

== Personal life ==
Whitehead is the nephew of former NFL defensive end Willie Whitehead. Whitehead is married and has four sons. He is the older brother of Dariq Whitehead, a former 5-star recruit who played on the Duke Blue Devils men's basketball team and was selected 22nd overall by the Brooklyn Nets in the 2023 NBA draft.
