= 2011 Mid-American Conference football season =

- League: NCAA Division I FBS (Football Bowl Subdivision)
- Sport: Football
- Duration: September 1, 2011 through January, 2012
- Teams: 13
- TV partner(s): ABC, ESPN, ESPN2, Big Ten Network

Regular season
- Season MVP: Chandler Harnish
- East champions: Ohio
- West champions: NIU, Toledo

MAC Championship Game
- Champions: NIU
- Runners-up: Ohio
- Finals MVP: Nathan Palmer (NIU)

Football seasons
- 2010 2012

2011 Mid-American Conference football standings
	Conf.			Overall
Team	W		L	W		L
East Division
Ohio xy	6	–	2	10	–	4
Temple	5	–	3	9	–	4
Kent State	4	–	4	5	–	7
Bowling Green	3	–	5	5	–	7
Miami (OH)	3	–	5	4	–	8
Buffalo	2	–	6	3	–	9
Akron	0	–	8	1	–	11
West Division
Northern Illinois xy$	7	–	1	11	–	3
Toledo x	7	–	1	9	–	4
Western Michigan	5	–	3	7	–	6
Ball State	4	–	4	6	–	6
Eastern Michigan	4	–	4	6	–	6
Central Michigan	2	–	6	3	–	9
Championship: Northern Illinois 23, Ohio 20
$ – Conference champion; x – Division champion/co-champions; y – Championship game participant

The 2011 Mid-American Conference football season is the 66th season for the Mid-American Conference (MAC). The season began on Thursday, September 1, with four games: Bowling Green played at Idaho, Central Michigan hosted South Carolina State, Temple hosted #14 (FCS) Villanova, and Toledo hosted #10 (FCS) New Hampshire. The conference's other nine teams began their respective 2011 seasons of NCAA Division I FBS (Football Bowl Subdivision) competition on Saturday, September 3. The first in-conference game was September 10, with Temple hosting Akron.

== Preseason ==
=== Preseason poll ===
The 2011 MAC Preseason poll results were announced at the Football Media Preview in Detroit on July 26. In the East Division, Miami was picked as champion, while Toledo was picked to win the West Division and the MAC Championship Game.

==== East Division ====
1. Miami - 97 points; 4 first-place votes
2. Ohio - 96 points; 8 first-place votes
3. Temple - 88 points; 4 first-place votes
4. Kent State - 57 points
5. Bowling Green - 48 points
6. Buffalo - 37 points
7. Akron - 25 points

==== West Division ====
1. Toledo - 83 points; 8 first-place votes
2. NIU - 81 points; 5 first-place votes
3. Western Michigan - 76 points; 2 first-place votes
4. Central Michigan - 55 points; 1 first-place vote
5. Ball State - 27 points
6. Eastern Michigan - 24 points

==== MAC Championship ====
Three votes were not cast for any team.

1. Toledo - 5 votes
2. NIU - 3 votes
3. Miami - 3 votes
4. Ohio - 1 vote
5. Western Michigan - 1 vote

== Head coaches ==
East Division

- Rob Ianello, Akron (2nd Year)
- Dave Clawson, Bowling Green (3rd Year)
- Jeff Quinn, Buffalo (2nd Year)
- Darrell Hazell, Kent State (1st Year)
- Don Treadwell, Miami (1st Year)
- Frank Solich, Ohio (7th Year)
- Steve Addazio, Temple (1st Year)

West Division

- Pete Lembo, Ball State (1st Year)
- Dan Enos, Central Michigan (2nd Year)
- Ron English, Eastern Michigan (3rd Year)
- Dave Doeren, NIU (1st Year)
- Tim Beckman, Toledo (3rd Year)
- Bill Cubit Western Michigan (7th Year)

=== Pre-season coaching changes ===
On November 21, the day after Kent State's seventh loss of the season assured them of a losing record, Doug Martin announced that he would resign at the end of the season. On December 20, Kent State athletic director Joel Nielsen introduced former Ohio State receivers coach Darrell Hazell as the new head coach for the Golden Flashes. Hazell was the first Ohio State assistant coach to leave for a head coaching job in six years; the last was Mark Snyder, who was hired by Marshall in 2004.

On November 23, three days after Ball State concluded its season with a 4–8 record, Ball State athletic director Tom Collins announced the firing of Stan Parrish, saying, "As we evaluated the on-field performance and the football program in its entirety, we decided it was time for a change in direction in the leadership of the program". On December 19, Collins announced that he had hired Pete Lembo, formerly the head coach at Elon.

On December 5, NIU head coach Jerry Kill accepted the position of head coach for the Minnesota Golden Gophers. His announcement came less than two weeks before the Huskies were scheduled to play in the Humanitarian Bowl. Leaving the team in the manner he did (many teammates learned about his new job via Twitter instead of from Kill himself) dealt an emotional blow to the members of the team; star quarterback Chandler Harnish saying about Kill's departure, "I have a horrible taste in my mouth". Additionally, besides the emotional impact, USA Today noted "The timing of the announcement further hurts the program due to Kill most likely taking the bulk of his staff to Minnesota." On December 9, linebackers coach Tom Matukewicz was announced as the interim head coach for the Huskies bowl game, and on December 13, the university hired Wisconsin Badgers defensive coordinator Dave Doeren as the head coach, to begin after the Humanitarian Bowl.

On December 12, ESPN reported that Al Golden was offered and accepted the head coaching job at the University of Miami. Prior to the 2010 season, provisions requiring bowls to pick teams with seven or more wins if available before picking six-win teams were eliminated from NCAA bylaws, and Temple was the first team go uninvited under the rule change, despite going 8–4 including a win over eventual Big East BCS representative Connecticut. On December 22, a rumor was quickly confirmed that Florida offensive coordinator, and former Florida interim head coach (winter of 2009-2010), Steve Addazio would be the new Temple coach.

On December 16, ESPN reported that Michael Haywood, who had been named the 2010 Mid-American Conference Football Coach of the Year days before, had accepted the head football coaching position at the University of Pittsburgh. Haywood was arrested in South Bend, Indiana on December 31, 2010, on felony domestic violence charges arising from a custody dispute, and was fired by Pittsburgh hours after being released on bond the next morning. Defensive backs coach Lance Guidry will coach Miami University in the 2011 GoDaddy.com Bowl. On December 31, 2010, Miami University hired Michigan State offensive coordinator Don Treadwell as its head coach.

== 2011 MAC Specialty Award Winners ==
Vern Smith Leadership Award Winner: QB Chandler Harnish, Northern Illinois
Coach of the Year: Ron English, Eastern Michigan
Offensive Player of the Year: QB Chandler Harnish, Northern Illinois
Defensive Player of the Year: DL Drew Nowak, Western Michigan
Special Teams Player of the Year: K Matt Weller, Ohio
Freshman of the Year: RB Anthon Samuel, Bowling Green

== All-Conference teams ==
2011 All-MAC First Team Offense
Quarterback – Chandler Harnish, Northern Illinois
Center – Scott Wedige, Northern Illinois
Offensive Linemen – Mike VanDerMeulen, Toledo
Offensive Lineman – Trevor Olson, Northern Illinois
Offensive Lineman – Joe Flading, Ohio
Offensive Linemen – Pat Boyle, Temple
Tight End – Evan Rodriguez, Temple
Wide Receiver – Jordan White, Western Michigan
Wide Receiver – Eric Page, Toledo
Wide Receiver – Nick Harwell, Miami
Wide Receiver – Kamar Jorden, Bowling Green
Running Back – Bernard Pierce, Temple
Running Back – Branden Oliver, Buffalo
Placekicker – Mathew Sims, Northern Illinois

2011 All-MAC First Team Defense
Outside Linebacker – Aaron Morris, Ball State
Outside Linebacker – Khalil Mack, Buffalo
Inside Linebacker – Brian Wagner, Akron
Inside Linebacker – Dwayne Woods, Bowling Green
Down Lineman – Roosevelt Nix, Kent State
Down Lineman – Adrian Robinson, Temple
Down Lineman – Chris Jones, Bowling Green
Down Lineman – Drew Nowak, Western Michigan
Defensive Back – Jahleel Addae, Central Michigan
Defensive Back – Dayonne Nunley, Miami
Defensive Back – Desmond Marrow, Toledo
Defensive Back – Sean Baker, Ball State
Punter – Brian Schmiedebusch, Bowling Green

2011 All-MAC First Team Specialists
Kickoff Return Specialist – Eric Page, Toledo
Punt Return Specialist – Eric Page, Toledo

2011 All-MAC Second Team Offense
Quarterback – Alex Carder, Western Michigan
Center – Zac Kerin, Toledo
Offensive Lineman – Brandon Brooks, Miami
Offensive Lineman – Jordan Hansel, Ball State
Offensive Lineman – Brian Winters, Kent State
Offensive Lineman – Eric Herman, Ohio
Tight End – David Blackburn, Central Michigan
Wide Receiver – LaVon Brazill, Ohio
Wide Receiver – Briggs Orsbon, Ball State
Wide Receiver – Perez Ashford, Northern Illinois
Wide Receiver – Marcus Rivers, Buffalo
Running Back – Adonis Thomas, Toledo
Running Back – Jasmin Hopkins, Northern Illinois
Placekicker – Matt Weller, Ohio

2011 All-MAC Second Team Defense
Outside Linebacker – C.J. Malauulu, Kent State
Outside Linebacker – Tahir Whitehead, Temple
Inside Linebacker – Travis Freeman, Ball State
Inside Linebacker – Noah Keller, Ohio
Down Lineman – Sean Progar-Jackson, Northern Illinois
Down Lineman – Tremayne Scott, Ohio
Down Lineman – Nate Ollie, Ball State
Down Lineman – Brad Ohrman, Eastern Michigan
Defensive Back – Johnnie Simon, Western Michigan
Defensive Back – Josh Pleasant, Kent State
Defensive Back – Jimmie Ward, Northern Illinois
Defensive Back – T. J. Carrie, Ohio
Punter – Brandon McManus, Temple

2011 All-MAC Second Team Specialists
Kickoff Return Specialist – BooBoo Gates, Bowling Green
Punt Return Specialist – Jamill Smith, Ball State

2011 All-MAC Third Team Offense
Quarterback – Tyler Tettleton, Ohio
Center – Ben Bojicic, Bowling Green
Offensive Lineman – Dann O’Neill, Western Michigan
Offensive Lineman – Wayne Tribue, Temple
Offensive Lineman – Eric Fisher, Central Michigan
Offensive Lineman – A.J. Strum, Ohio
Tight End – Garrett Hoskins, Eastern Michigan
Wide Receiver – Nathan Palmer, Northern Illinois
Wide Receiver – Titus Davis, Central Michigan
Wide Receiver – Cody Wilson, Central Michigan
Wide Receiver – Chleb Ravenell, Western Michigan
Running Back – Donte’ Harden, Ohio
Running Back – Matt Brown, Temple
Placekicker – John Potter, Western Michigan

2011 All-MAC Third Team Defense
Outside Linebacker – Justin Cudworth, Eastern Michigan
Outside Linebacker – Jerrell Wedge, Miami
Inside Linebacker – Luke Batton, Kent State
Inside Linebacker – Ryan Kennedy, Miami
Down Lineman – Austin Brown, Miami
Down Lineman – Morkeith Brown, Temple
Down Lineman – Freddie Bishop, Western Michigan
Down Lineman – T.J. Fatinikun, Toledo
Defensive Back – Latarrius Thomas, Eastern Michigan
Defensive Back – Kevin Kroboth, Temple
Defensive Back – Luke Wollet, Kent State
Defensive Back – Marlon Pollard, Eastern Michigan
Punter – Scott Kovanda, Ball State

2011 All-MAC Third Team Specialists Kickoff Return Specialist – Donte’ Harden, Ohio
Punt Return Specialist – Terrell Jackson, Buffalo
