= Nate Ollie =

American football player and coach (born 1992)

Atlanta Falcons
- Title: Defensive line coach

Personal information
- Born: January 8, 1992 (age 34); Chicago, Illinois, U.S.
- Listed height: 6 ft 0 in (1.83 m)
- Listed weight: 298 lb (135 kg)

Career information
- Position: Defensive tackle
- High school: Mount Carmel (Chicago, Illinois)
- College: Ball State (2010–2013)

Career history
- Yorktown MS (2014) Assistant coach; Tennessee (2015–2017) Graduate assistant; Tennessee (2017) Interim defensive line coach; Eastern Kentucky (2018) Defensive line coach; Philadelphia Eagles (2019–2020) Assistant defensive line coach; New York Jets (2021) Assistant defensive line coach; Indianapolis Colts (2022–2023) Defensive line coach; Houston Texans (2024) Assistant defensive line coach; Atlanta Falcons (2025–present) Defensive line coach

Awards and highlights
- Second-team All-MAC (2011, 2013)

Nathan Christopher Ollie (born January 8, 1992) is an American professional football coach and former defensive tackle who is the defensive line coach for the Atlanta Falcons of the National Football League (NFL). Ollie played college football for the Ball State Cardinals.

== Early life and college career ==
Ollie attended Mount Carmel High School in his hometown of Chicago, Illinois, where he played football. After graduating high school, Ollie attended Ball State University, where he continued to play football. While at Ball State, Ollie was named to the second-team All-MAC team in 2011 and 2013. Ollie initially studied criminal justice and intended to be a police officer while at Ball State until his junior year, when his father, Anthony, died. After his current defensive line coach at Ball State, Chad Wilt, drove Ollie to and from his father's funeral in Chicago, Ollie became motivated to change his career path to coaching following a conversation with Wilt during the drive back.

Pre-draft measurables
Height	Weight	Arm length	Hand span	Wingspan	40-yard dash	10-yard split	20-yard split	20-yard shuttle	Three-cone drill	Vertical jump	Broad jump	Bench press
6 ft 0 1/2 in (1.84 m)	298 lb (135 kg)	32 in (0.81 m)	9 1/2 in (0.24 m)	6 ft 5 1/4 in (1.96 m)	5.25 s	1.73 s	2.90 s	4.90 s	8.43 s	28.5 in (0.72 m)	8 ft 9 in (2.67 m)	27 reps
All values from Pro Day

== Coaching career ==
After graduating from Ball State, Ollie first worked as an assistant coach at Yorktown Middle School. Ollie then spent the next three years as a graduate assistant for the Tennessee Volunteers football team, and was elevated to interim defensive line coach in 2017. In 2018, Ollie was named the defensive line coach for the Eastern Kentucky Colonels. After a year there, Ollie joined the NFL as an assistant defensive line coach for the Philadelphia Eagles. Ollie spent two years there until taking the same job for the New York Jets in 2021. In 2022, Ollie was elevated to defensive line coach after joining the Indianapolis Colts. While with the Colts, Ollie helped raise the number of sacks from 33 in the year before his arrival to 44 in 2022, and then 51 in 2023, which was the most since the team moved to Indianapolis in 1984. However, Ollie's contract was unexpectedly not retained by the Colts, and instead he joined the Houston Texans as an assistant defensive line coach in 2024. In his lone season with the Texans, Ollie helped the team reach 49 sacks on the season, tied for fourth most in the NFL and the most in a single season in Texans history. After one year in Houston, Ollie again became the sole defensive line coach after being hired by the Atlanta Falcons in 2025. Ollie's hiring was intended to revitalize the Falcons' pass rush, which has finished near the bottom of the NFL in sacks over the past four years, with Ollie's energetic coaching. In his first year with the Falcons, Ollie helped the team record 57 sacks, setting a new franchise record for sacks in a season.
