= Adrian Robinson =

American gridiron football player (1989–2015)

Adrian Robinson Jr.

No. 57, 99, 97
- Position: Linebacker

Personal information
- Born: November 21, 1989; Harrisburg, Pennsylvania, U.S.
- Died: May 16, 2015 (aged 25); Philadelphia, Pennsylvania, U.S.
- Listed height: 6 ft 1 in (1.85 m)
- Listed weight: 250 lb (113 kg)

Career information
- High school: Harrisburg (Harrisburg, Pennsylvania)
- College: Temple (2008–2011)
- NFL draft: 2012: undrafted

Career history
- Pittsburgh Steelers (2012); Philadelphia Eagles (2013)*; Denver Broncos (2013); San Diego Chargers (2013); Washington Redskins (2013); Tampa Bay Buccaneers (2014)*; Hamilton Tiger-Cats (2015)*
- * Offseason or practice squad member only

Awards and highlights
- MAC Defensive Player of the Year (2009); 3× First-team All-MAC (2009, 2010, 2011)

Career NFL statistics
- Total tackles: 3
- Stats at Pro Football Reference

Adrian Lynn Robinson Jr. (November 21, 1989 – May 16, 2015) was an American professional football linebacker. He was signed by the Pittsburgh Steelers as an undrafted free agent in 2012. He played college football at Temple University.

He also played for the Philadelphia Eagles, Denver Broncos, San Diego Chargers, and Washington Redskins.

== Early life ==
Adrian Robinson was born on November 21, 1989, in Harrisburg, Pennsylvania to Adrian Robinson Sr, and Terry. Robinson attended Harrisburg High School, where he was named a three star prospect by scout.com. He graduated from Harrisburg High in 2008. Robinson was selected to play in the Big 33 Football Classic during his senior year and voted the most valuable player in that game. He was also a two-time all state honoree at Harrisburg. Robinson received D-1 offers from Temple, Pittsburgh, and Connecticut.

Robinson attended Temple University where he majored in communications.

== College career ==
=== Temple University ===
In 2008, Robinson played in all twelve games of the college season, including three starts at defensive end.

In his sophomore season, Robinson was named the MAC Defensive Player of the Year. He also earned such accolades as 2009 first-team All-MAC honoree, first-team All-MAC by Phil Steele, 2009 MAC Defensive MVP by the Sporting News and ESPN.com's All-Non-Automatic Qualifying Team selection. He was first-team All-MAC again as a junior and senior. He finished his college career with a dominating performance in the 37–15 victory over Wyoming in the 2011 Gildan New Mexico Bowl. It was Temple's first bowl victory since 1979.

== Professional career ==
=== Pittsburgh Steelers ===
On April 28, 2012, Robinson was signed by the Pittsburgh Steelers as an undrafted free agent.

=== Philadelphia Eagles ===
On August 23, 2013, the Steelers traded Robinson to the Philadelphia Eagles for running back Felix Jones. He was released by the Eagles on August 30, 2013.

=== Denver Broncos ===
On September 1, 2013, the Denver Broncos claimed Robinson. He was waived by the Broncos on October 15, 2013.

=== San Diego Chargers ===
On November 12, 2013, the San Diego Chargers signed Robinson. He was released by the Chargers on December 7, 2013.

=== Washington Redskins ===
On December 24, 2013, the Washington Redskins signed Robinson. He was waived on August 24, 2014.

=== Tampa Bay Buccaneers ===
Robinson was signed to the Tampa Bay Buccaneers' practice squad on September 10, 2014. He was released by the Buccaneers on September 23, 2014.

=== Hamilton Tiger-Cats ===
Robinson signed with the Hamilton Tiger-Cats of the Canadian Football League (CFL) on April 27, 2015.

== Death ==
Robinson died on May 16, 2015. The medical examiner later ruled his death as a suicide by hanging.

Robinson is survived by his daughter, Avery Marie.

On October 14, 2015, Robinson's family announced that a diagnosis of chronic traumatic encephalopathy (CTE) was confirmed through officials at the Concussion Legacy Foundation at Boston University. He is one of at least 345 NFL players to be diagnosed after death with this disease, which is caused by repeated hits to the head.

== See also ==
- List of gridiron football players who died during their careers
