= Roosevelt Nix (fullback) =

American football player (born 1992)

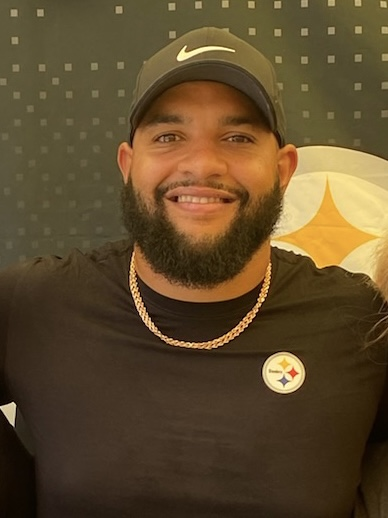
- Nix in 2024

No. 43, 45, 33
- Position: Fullback

Personal information
- Born: March 30, 1992 (age 34); Reynoldsburg, Ohio, U.S.
- Listed height: 5 ft 11 in (1.80 m)
- Listed weight: 248 lb (112 kg)

Career information
- High school: Reynoldsburg
- College: Kent State
- NFL draft: 2014: undrafted

Career history
- Atlanta Falcons (2014)*; Pittsburgh Steelers (2015–2019); Indianapolis Colts (2020)*
- * Offseason or practice squad member only

Awards and highlights
- Pro Bowl (2017); MAC Defensive Player of the Year (2010); MAC Freshman Player of the Year (2010); 4× First-team All-MAC (2010, 2011, 2012, 2013)

Career NFL statistics
- Rushing attempts: 4
- Rushing yards: 4
- Rushing touchdowns: 1
- Receptions: 12
- Receiving yards: 69
- Receiving touchdowns: 1
- Stats at Pro Football Reference

Roosevelt Delbert Nix-Jones (born March 30, 1992) is an American former professional football player who was a fullback in the National Football League (NFL). He played college football for the Kent State Golden Flashes, and was signed by the Atlanta Falcons after going undrafted in the 2014 NFL draft. As a member of the Pittsburgh Steelers, Nix made the 2018 Pro Bowl. Nix's father also played in the NFL.

== Early life ==
Nix attended Reynoldsburg High School. He was named OCC player of the year while earning second team all-state, first team All-district, All-metro, and OCC honors his senior year. He played for Ohio in the 2010 Big 33 Classic and was also selected to play in the Ohio North-South All-Star game. Nix recorded 84 tackles and eight sacks as a junior, garnering second team All-state, All-conference, first-team All-district, Super 25, and first team OCC recognition. He also lettered in wrestling.

== College career ==
=== Freshman season (2010) ===
After graduating from high school, Nix began attending Kent State University. He joined the Golden Flashes football team as a defensive lineman and played his freshman season under head coach Doug Martin. In his first two career games against Murray State and Boston College, he would force a fumble and record a sack. In Week 5, in a game against Miami University, he ended the game with three tackles-for-loss, a sack, and a forced fumble making it four forced fumbles in his first five career games. The next game, he recorded 3.5 sacks and force another fumble against Akron. He continued in Week 8 with five tackles, two sacks, 3.5 tackles-for-loss, and blocked an extra point in a win over Bowling Green. In a Week 10 game against Temple, he recorded a career-high five tackles in the 28-10 loss. He finished his first season at Kent State with 43 tackles (19 solo), 10 sacks, four forced fumbled, and led the MAC conference with 20 tackles for a loss. Following the season, he was voted first-team All-MAC and MAC Freshman Player of the Year. Additionally, he became Kent State's first freshman to ever win the MAC Defensive Player of the Year award.

=== Sophomore season (2011) ===
With a 5–7 finish in Nix's freshman year, Kent State chose to hire Darrell Hazell to replace Martin as Kent State's head coach for 2011. In the season opener, Nix recorded six tackles, two tackles-for-loss, and a sack against #2 Alabama. On September 29, he forced a fumble that led to the game-winning touchdown in a victory against FCS South Alabama. While playing Northern Illinois, he finished the game with four tackles, two tackles-for-loss, and a forced fumble. In a week 11 contest against Akron, he had a career-high six tackles, 1.5 tackles-for-loss, and two pass break ups in a performance that won him MAC East Defensive Player of the Week. He ended his first season under Hazell, being voted to first-team All-MAC for the second consecutive year and finishing with 39 tackles (25 solo), 4.5 sacks, three forced fumbles, and led Kent State with 17 tackles for a loss.

=== Junior season (2012) ===
Nix was voted as a team captain by his coaches and teammates and opened his junior season with eight tackles, four tackles-for-loss, and a sack against #7 FCS Towson. In Week 4, he recorded five solo tackles, two tackles-for-loss, a sack, and a forced fumble in a 45–43 victory over Ball State. On October 13, in a victory over Army, he recorded five tackles, two tackles-for-loss, and a sack. On November 30, he finished with a total of five tackles and a sack in an overtime loss to Northern Illinois. The Golden Flashes finished their season with a loss to Arkansas State in the 2013 GoDaddy.com Bowl and with a record of 11–3. Nix ended his junior season with 59 tackles (36 solo), 15 tackles for loss, six sacks, and three forced fumbles while also being voted first-team All-MAC by Phil Steele in recognition of his successful season.

=== Senior season (2013) ===
Following their success the previous year, head coach Hazell resigned and took a job with Purdue. Paul Haynes was then named head coach, being Nix's third during his time at Kent State. In a Week 2 contest, he finished with four tackles-for-loss in a 41–22 loss to Bowling Green. In Week 5, he recorded a career-high eight tackles against Western Michigan. For his last collegiate game, he recorded six tackles, a tackle-for-loss, and a forced fumble in a victory over Ohio. For his last season at Kent State, he finished with a total of 41 tackles (22 solo), 13 tackles-for-loss, 3.5 sacks, and two forced fumbles. He was also voted defensive captain by his teammates and first-team All-MAC by Sports Illustrated.

Nix ended his collegiate career leading Kent State with 65 tackles for a loss and second in school history with 25 sacks. He also accumulated 182 tackles (102 solo) and 12 forced fumbles. He also was the first player in school history to receive first-team all conference honors all four seasons of his career. His 65 tackles-for-loss ranks him fourth of all-time in NCAA History.

== Professional career ==
=== Pre-draft ===
Even though he had a productive career as a defensive end at Kent State, Nix was projected to go undrafted due to his small stature for his position and was not invited to work out at the NFL Combine. He decided to switch to linebacker before Kent State's Pro Day and shed 19 lbs. Representatives from eight NFL teams showed up to Kent State's Pro Day to watch 11 prospects including Dri Archer.

Pre-draft measurables
Height	Weight	40-yard dash	10-yard split	20-yard split	20-yard shuttle	Three-cone drill	Vertical jump	Broad jump	Bench press
5 ft 11 1/4 in (1.81 m)	248 lb (112 kg)	4.79 s	1.63 s	2.79 s	4.39 s	6.90 s	28 in (0.71 m)	9 ft 2 in (2.79 m)	22 reps
All values from Kent State Pro day.

=== Atlanta Falcons ===
On May 10, 2014, the Atlanta Falcons signed Nix to a three-year, $1.54 million contract after he went undrafted in the 2014 NFL Draft. He appeared on Hard Knocks with the Falcons. To have a better opportunity to make the 53-man roster, Nix switched positions from linebacker to fullback but was eventually released by the Falcons on August 3, 2014.

Nix was assigned to the Cleveland Gladiators of the Arena Football League (AFL) on October 9, 2014. He was placed on Other League Exempt by the team on January 5, 2015.

=== Pittsburgh Steelers ===
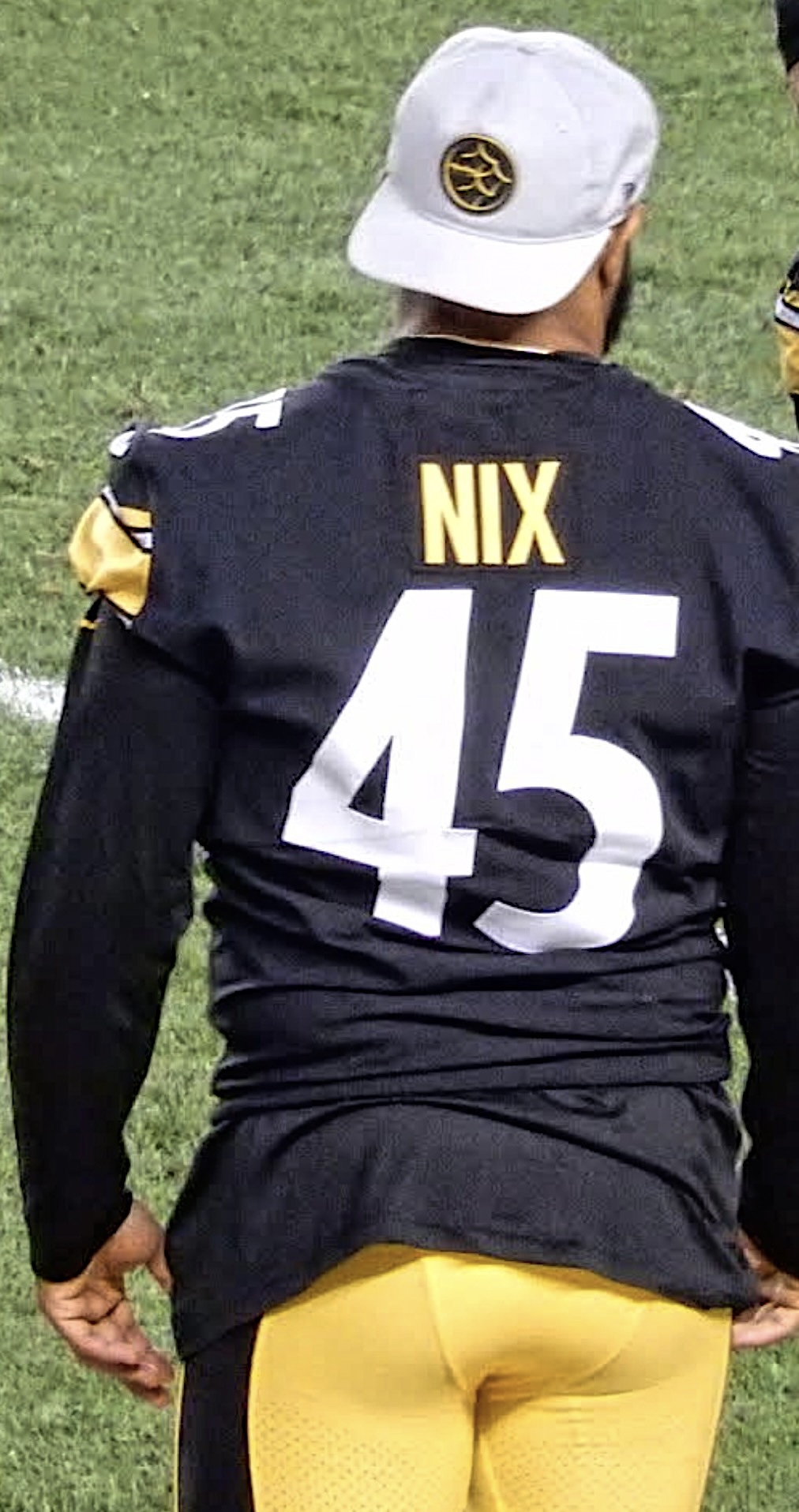
Nix with the Steelers

==== 2015 ====
On January 9, 2015, the Pittsburgh Steelers signed Nix to a one-year, $435,000 reserve/futures contract, reuniting him with former Kent State teammate Dri Archer. He originally was signed as an inside linebacker but with too much depth at the position he was again switched to fullback. With the Steelers' history of not typically using fullbacks under offensive coordinator Todd Haley and former coordinator Bruce Arians, Nix's best chance of keeping a position was a roster was to excel on special teams. During the pre-season, he made notable plays on special teams, including a blocked kick.

On September 5, 2015, Nix made the regular season roster and was slated to be the backup to veteran Will Johnson. On October 18, 2015, he made his first career start during the Steelers' 25-14 victory over the Arizona Cardinals. He finished his first season appearing in 15 games with four starts. His first forced fumble was during Week 9 of the 2015 NFL season, on special teams, when the Steelers hosted the Oakland Raiders. For the season, he recorded two receptions for 11 yards, and seven special teams tackles. Nix was unfortunately unable to finish the season due to a foot injury.

==== 2016 ====
On January 19, 2016, he was signed to a one-year, $525,000 contract extension.

During the 2015-2016 offseason, former starting fullback Will Johnson left via free agency to join the New York Giants. The Steelers named Nix the de facto starter at fullback going into the 2016 regular season. Nix was unable to appear in the first five games due to a back injury he suffered prior to the season-opener. On October 16, 2016, he appeared in his first game of the season during the Steelers' 30-15 loss to the Miami Dolphins. Nix made his first start of the season during a Week 11 victory over the Cleveland Browns. On January 1, 2017, he made his first two receptions for five receiving yards in a 27-24 overtime win over the Cleveland Browns. He finished his second season with two starts in ten games recording two catches for five yards.

==== 2017 ====
On January 26, 2017, the Steelers re-signed Nix to a one-year, $615,000 contract.

He was the only fullback on the roster throughout training camp, making him their de facto starter to begin the regular season. On December 10, 2017, Nix scored his first career touchdown on a one-yard pass by Ben Roethlisberger in the fourth quarter of a 39-38 comeback victory over the Baltimore Ravens. On December 25, Nix scored his first career rushing touchdown with a one-yard run against the Houston Texans in the second quarter. On January 22, 2018, he was named to his first Pro Bowl as a replacement for the Super Bowl-bound James Develin.

==== 2018 ====
On February 10, 2018, Nix signed a four-year contract extension with the Steelers. On December 23, Nix briefly became the subject of ridicule for celebrating what he thought was a fourth down conversion on a fake punt against the New Orleans Saints when in actuality he was stopped a yard short.

==== 2019 ====
On September 2, 2019, Nix was voted as a first-time Steelers' Special Teams Captain by his teammates. He was placed on injured reserve on November 14. Nix was designated for return from injured reserve on December 26, and began practicing with the team again, but was not activated as the Steelers failed to make the playoffs.

Nix was released by the Steelers on March 18, 2020.

=== Indianapolis Colts ===
Nix signed with the Indianapolis Colts on April 11, 2020. He was released on August 31.

Nix announced his retirement from football on July 13, 2021.

== Personal life ==
Nix-Jones was born on March 30, 1992, in Reynoldsburg, Ohio to Lisa and Roosevelt Nix. His stepfather's name is Johnny Jones. He has two younger siblings, Keela and Jalen Jones. During her time in college, his mother, Lisa, was a standout softball player at Bowling Green.
