= Scott Wedige =

American football player (born 1988)

No. 66, 61
- Position: Center

Personal information
- Born: November 20, 1988 (age 38); Elkhorn, Wisconsin, U.S.
- Listed height: 6 ft 4 in (1.93 m)
- Listed weight: 310 lb (141 kg)

Career information
- High school: Elkhorn Area
- College: Northern Illinois
- NFL draft: 2012: undrafted

Career history
- Arizona Cardinals (2012)*; New York Giants (2012)*; Cincinnati Bengals (2012)*; Arizona Cardinals (2012); New York Jets (2013)*; Cincinnati Bengals (2013)*
- * Offseason or practice squad member only

Awards and highlights
- 2× First-team All-MAC (2010, 2011)

Career NFL statistics
- Games played: 2
- Stats at Pro Football Reference

Scott Wedige (born November 20, 1988) is an American former professional football player who was a center in the National Football League (NFL). He signed with the Arizona Cardinals as an undrafted free agent in 2012. He played college football for the Northern Illinois Huskies.

== College career ==
He was a second team All-American selection and also was a co-winner of the NIU Offensive Lineman of the Year award after his senior season.

== Professional career ==
=== Arizona Cardinals ===
On April 30, 2012, he signed with the Arizona Cardinals as an undrafted free agent. On August 31, 2012, he was released.

=== New York Giants ===
On September 7, 2012, he was signed with the New York Giants to join the practice squad. On September 17, 2012, he was released from the practice squad.

=== Cincinnati Bengals ===
On November 6, 2012, he signed with the Cincinnati Bengals to join the practice squad.

=== Second Stint with the Arizona Cardinals ===
On November 26, 2012, he was signed from the Cincinnati Bengals practice squad to join the Arizona Cardinals active roster after the team placed Center Lyle Sendlein on Injured Reserve to a torn MCL injury. On August 19, 2013, he was released by the Cardinals.

=== New York Jets ===
On August 20, 2013, he was claimed off waivers by the New York Jets to serve as backup behind veteran pro bowl center Nick Mangold. He was released three days later.

=== Second Stint with the Cincinnati Bengals ===
On December 3, 2013, he signed with the Cincinnati Bengals for the second time. He was waived on April 28, 2014.
