= Drew Nowak =

American football player (born 1990)

No. 64, 62
- Position: Center

Personal information
- Born: March 7, 1990 (age 36); Green Bay, Wisconsin, U.S.
- Listed height: 6 ft 3 in (1.91 m)
- Listed weight: 300 lb (136 kg)

Career information
- High school: De Pere (WI)
- College: Western Michigan
- NFL draft: 2012: undrafted

Career history
- Jacksonville Jaguars (2012–2013); Seattle Seahawks (2014–2015); Kansas City Chiefs (2016)*
- * Offseason or practice squad member only

Awards and highlights
- MAC Defensive Player of the Year (2011); First-team All-MAC (2011)

Career NFL statistics
- Games played: 10
- Games started: 7
- Stats at Pro Football Reference

Drew Nowak (born March 7, 1990) is an American former professional football player who was a center in the National Football League (NFL). He was signed by the Jacksonville Jaguars as an undrafted free agent in 2012. He played college football for the Western Michigan Broncos.

== Early life ==
Nowak played high school football at De Pere High School in De Pere, Wisconsin, a suburb of Green Bay. He played mostly on the defensive line but played some center his senior year.

He attended college at Western Michigan University. Donning jersey number 92, he totalled 180 total tackles as a defensive lineman. He led the Mid-American Conference in tackles for loss and sacks his senior year.

== Professional career ==
=== Jacksonville Jaguars ===
Nowak signed with the Jacksonville Jaguars following the 2012 NFL draft as a rookie free agent. He was originally signed as a defensive tackle, but due to depth at the position and injuries on the offensive line, he made the switch to offensive guard. Nowak spent the entire 2012 season on injured reserve.

Nowak was released on August 30, 2013, and signed to the team's practice squad on September 1. He was promoted to the active roster on December 17, 2013.

The Jaguars released Nowak on August 29, 2014.

=== Seattle Seahawks ===
The Seahawks signed Nowak to their practice squad September 3, 2014. On May 4, 2016, the Seahawks released Nowak.

Nowak was named the starting center for the Seahawks in September. 2015. On September 20th, 2015 Nowake made his first NFL start against the Green Bay Packers at Lambeau Field in front of his hometown crowd. On December 1, 2015, he was waived. On December 4, the Seahawks signed him to their practice squad.

On January 18, 2016, the Seahawks signed Nowak to a future/reserve contract. On May 4, 2016, Nowak was waived by the Seahawks.

=== Kansas City Chiefs ===
On May 10, 2016, the Kansas City Chiefs signed Nowak after he was cut by the Seahawks to make room for rookies. On August 28, 2016, Nowak was waived by the Chiefs.

== Personal life ==
Nowak grew up as a fan of his hometown Green Bay Packers, the only publicly owned NFL team, and owns three shares of the team, despite being a player for another NFL team. Drew currently owns Freedom Green Farms in Kalkaska, Michigan where he grows medical and recreational cannabis.
