= Marcus Rivers =

American gridiron football player (born 1989)

No. 19
- Position: Wide receiver

Personal information
- Born: August 2, 1989 (age 37); Lackawanna, New York, U.S.
- Listed height: 6 ft 5 in (1.96 m)
- Listed weight: 218 lb (99 kg)

Career information
- High school: Lackawanna (NY)
- College: Buffalo
- NFL draft: 2012: undrafted

Career history
- Green Bay Packers (2012)*; Edmonton Eskimos (2013)*; Baltimore Ravens (2013)*; Pittsburgh Power (2015)*
- * Offseason or practice squad member only

Awards and highlights
- Second-team All-MAC (2011)
- Stats at CFL.ca (archive)
- Stats at ArenaFan.com

Marcus Rivers (born August 2, 1989) is an American former football wide receiver. He played college football at the University of Buffalo. He signed with the Green Bay Packers as an undrafted free agent in 2012.

== Professional career ==
=== Green Bay Packers ===
On May 11, 2012, he signed with the Green Bay Packers as an undrafted free agent. On June 1, 2012, he was waived by the Packers.

=== Edmonton Eskimos ===
On April 18, 2013, he was released before the 2013 CFL season began.

=== Baltimore Ravens ===
On June 4, 2013, he signed with the Baltimore Ravens. On August 11, 2013, he was waived by the Ravens.

=== Pittsburgh Power ===
On November 15, 2014, Rivers was assigned to the Pittsburgh Power of the Arena Football League. The Power folded in November 2014.
