= Sean Progar-Jackson =

American football player (born 1990)

No. 59
- Position: Outside linebacker

Personal information
- Born: June 7, 1990 (age 36); Park Ridge, Illinois
- Listed height: 6 ft 3 in (1.91 m)
- Listed weight: 250 lb (113 kg)

Career information
- High school: Glenbrook (IL) South
- College: Northern Illinois
- NFL draft: 2013: undrafted

Career history
- New York Jets (2013)*
- * Offseason or practice squad member only

Awards and highlights
- 2× First-team All-MAC (2010, 2012); Second-team All-MAC (2011)

Sean Progar-Jackson (born June 7, 1990) is an American former football outside linebacker. He was signed by the New York Jets as an undrafted free agent in 2013. He played college football at Northern Illinois.

== Early life ==
He attended Glenbrook South High School in Glenview, Illinois. He was a three-time all-conference selection who earned all-state honors in his senior season and was an all-area selection as a junior in high school. He was named twice as the team's most valuable defensive player. He recorded a total of 40 sacks and forced 12 fumbles in three seasons while in high school.

== College career ==
Progar-Jackson played college football at Northern Illinois.

He was a redshirt freshman and sat out the entire 2008 season. He was selected as the team's defensive work team player of the year.

In his freshman year, he had 30 tackles, 6 sacks, 2 forced fumbles and one pass deflection. He earned freshman of the year honors with Northern Illinois as well as being selected as a Freshman All-American.

In his sophomore year, he recorded 38 tackles, 4 sacks and one pass deflection. He was selected to the first-team All Mid-American Conference team following the conclusion of the season.

In his junior year, he had 52 tackles, 5.5 sacks, one forced fumble and one pass deflection. He was selected to the second-team All Mid-American Conference team. He was selected as the NIU Defensive Lineman of the Year by the coaching staff.

In his senior year, he had 49 tackles, a career-high 8.5 sacks, one interception, 2 forced fumbles and 2 pass deflections. He was selected to the first-team All-MAC team following his senior season.

Progar-Jackson finished college with a total of 169 tackles, 24.5 sacks, 5 forced fumbles, 5 pass deflections and one interception.

== Professional career ==
On May 12, 2013, he signed with the New York Jets as an undrafted free agent. He was waived on August 26, 2013.
