= Brian Winters (American football) =

American football player (born 1991)

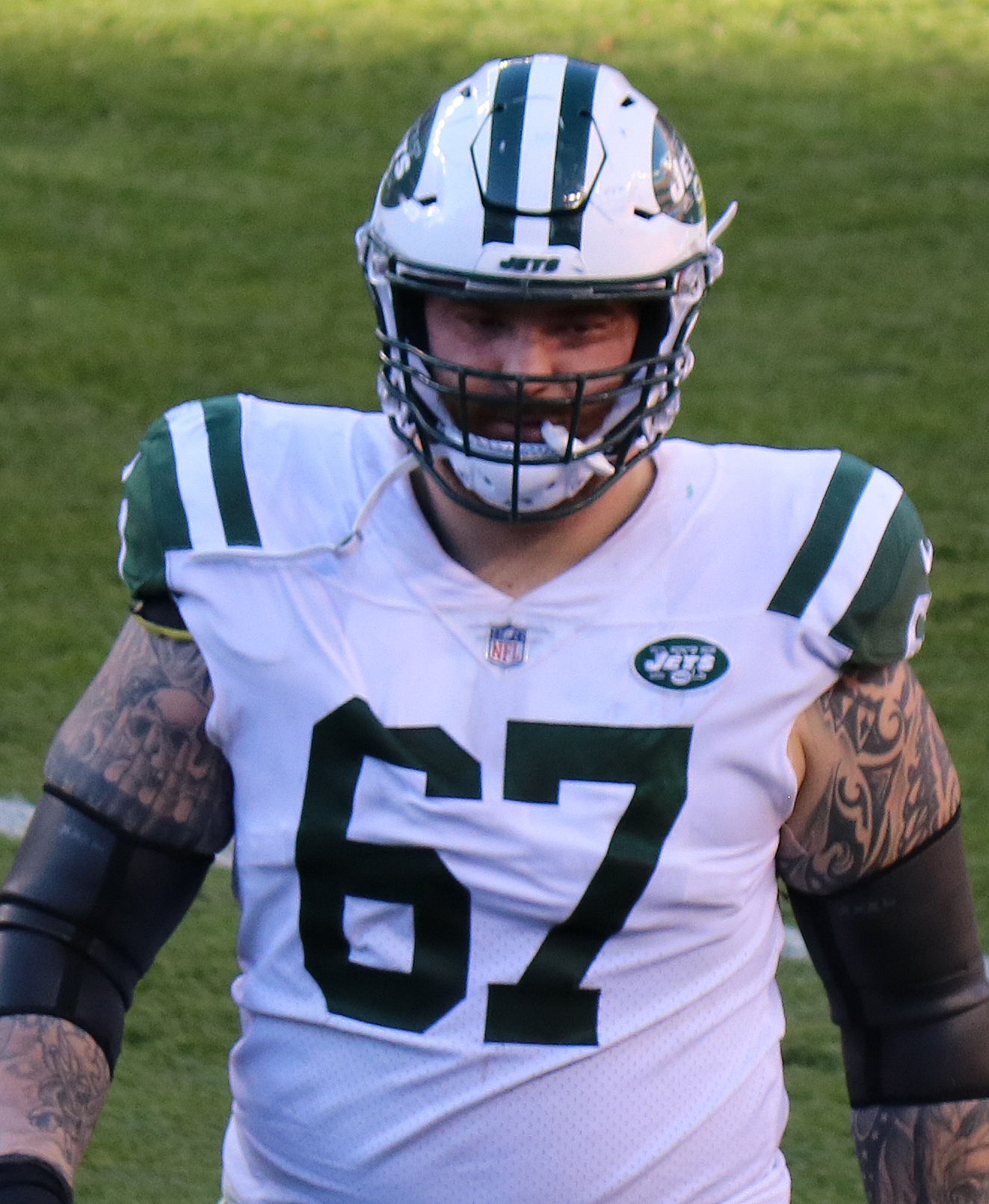
- Winters with the New York Jets in 2017

No. 67, 66, 65
- Position: Offensive guard

Personal information
- Born: July 10, 1991 (age 35); Hudson, Ohio, U.S.
- Listed height: 6 ft 4 in (1.93 m)
- Listed weight: 320 lb (145 kg)

Career information
- High school: Hudson
- College: Kent State (2009–2012)
- NFL draft: 2013: 3rd round, 72nd overall pick

Career history
- New York Jets (2013–2019); Buffalo Bills (2020); Arizona Cardinals (2021)

Awards and highlights
- First-team All-MAC (2012); Second-team All-MAC (2011)

Career NFL statistics
- Games played: 105
- Games started: 88
- Stats at Pro Football Reference

Brian Edward Winters (born July 10, 1991) is an American former professional football player who was an offensive guard in the National Football League (NFL). He was selected by the New York Jets in the third round of the 2013 NFL draft. He played college football for the Kent State Golden Flashes. He also played for the Buffalo Bills and Arizona Cardinals.

== Early life ==
Winters attended Hudson High School in Hudson, Ohio, and played high school football for the Hudson Explorers. He received All-Ohio and All-Northeast Ohio Conference honors his senior season, after being named all-conference his junior year. In addition to lettering in football twice, Winters also lettered three times in wrestling, and was named all-conference in wrestling his freshman and sophomore years. Rated as only a two-star recruit by Rivals.com, he accepted a scholarship offer from Kent State over offers from Akron and Syracuse.

== College career ==
Winters enrolled in Kent State University, where he played for the Kent State Golden Flashes football team from 2009 to 2012. He started every game after joining the Golden Flashes in 2009, 50 in total. He was named to the All-Mid-American Conference (MAC) team three times during his career: third-team as a sophomore, second-team as a junior, and first-team as a senior.

== Personal life ==
Winters is married. On his wedding day, Winters was subject to a pop-up drug test.

== Professional career ==
Pre-draft measurables
Height	Weight	Arm length	Hand span	Wingspan	40-yard dash	10-yard split	20-yard split	20-yard shuttle	Three-cone drill	Vertical jump	Broad jump	Bench press
6 ft 3 5/8 in (1.92 m)	320 lb (145 kg)	32 3/4 in (0.83 m)	9 3/4 in (0.25 m)	6 ft 5 1/4 in (1.96 m)	5.22 s	1.78 s	2.99 s	4.77 s	7.55 s	31.5 in (0.80 m)	8 ft 11 in (2.72 m)	9 reps
All values from NFL Combine/Pro Day

=== New York Jets ===
Winters was selected by the New York Jets in the third round, with the 72nd overall pick, of the 2013 NFL draft.

On May 10, 2013, Winters signed a four-year deal with the Jets. He started 12 games as a rookie.

On October 13, 2014, against the Denver Broncos, Winters left the game with a knee injury. The next day, an MRI revealed a torn ACL, prematurely ending his 2014 season.

In his first year as the full-time starter at right guard, Winters started 13 games in 2016. On October 2, 2016, against the Seattle Seahawks, Winters hit defensive end Michael Bennett head-to-head after a play, which drew a personal foul (15 yard penalty) and caused him to leave the game with concussion symptoms. He was placed on injured reserve on December 20, 2016.

On January 16, 2017, Winters signed a four-year contract extension with the Jets.

Winters started 13 games at right guard in 2017. He suffered an abdomen injury in Week 2, and played through the injury for most of the year before being placed on injured reserve on December 27, 2017.

On November 12, 2019, Winters was placed on injured reserve after a season-ending injury.

Winters was released by the Jets on August 2, 2020, after seven seasons with the team.

=== Buffalo Bills ===
On August 6, 2020, Winters signed with the Buffalo Bills after starting right guard Jon Feliciano suffered a torn pectoral muscle.

=== Arizona Cardinals ===
On March 24, 2021, Winters signed with the Arizona Cardinals on a one-year contract. He was released on September 25, 2021.
