= Brandon Brooks =

American football player (born 1989)

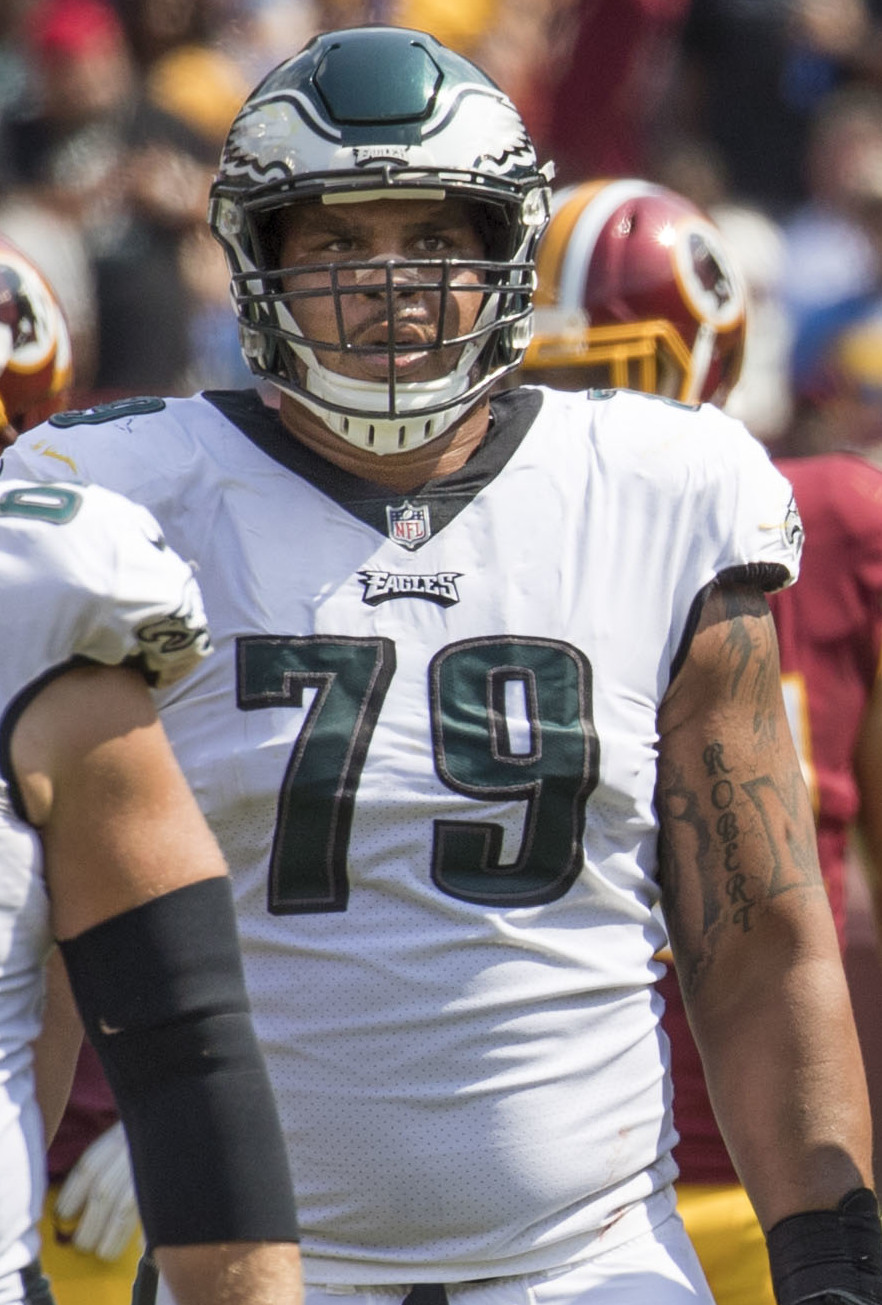
- Brooks with the Philadelphia Eagles in 2017

No. 79
- Position: Guard

Personal information
- Born: August 19, 1989 (age 37); Milwaukee, Wisconsin, U.S.
- Listed height: 6 ft 5 in (1.96 m)
- Listed weight: 335 lb (152 kg)

Career information
- High school: Riverside University (Milwaukee)
- College: Miami (OH) (2007–2011)
- NFL draft: 2012: 3rd round, 76th overall pick

Career history
- Houston Texans (2012–2015); Philadelphia Eagles (2016–2021)

Awards and highlights
- Super Bowl champion (LII); 3× Pro Bowl (2017–2019); Built Ford Tough Offensive Line of the Year (2017); 2× Second-team All-MAC (2009, 2011)

Career NFL statistics
- Games played: 114
- Games started: 108
- Fumble recoveries: 2
- Stats at Pro Football Reference

Brandon Brooks (born August 19, 1989) is an American former professional football player who was a guard for 10 seasons in the National Football League (NFL) with the Houston Texans and Philadelphia Eagles. He played college football for the Miami RedHawks and was selected in the third round by the Texans in the 2012 NFL draft.

Brooks played four seasons with the Texans, including three as a starter. In 2016, he joined the Eagles in free agency. He played for six seasons with the team, winning Super Bowl LII and making three consecutive Pro Bowls from 2017 to 2019 in the process. He retired after missing 31 combined regular season games over the next two seasons due to injuries.

== Early life ==
Brooks helped captain the Riverside University High School Tigers to an 11–2 record, a city championship and an appearance in the 2006 state semifinals and he was named all-state in 2006. He also played baseball and basketball.

== College career ==
A four-year starter at Miami, Brooks was named second-team All-MAC (Mid-American Conference) for each of the 2009, 2010 and 2011 seasons, the last of which the RedHawks went 10–4 overall, winning the MAC championship and a postseason bowl game. He earned a bachelor's degree in psychology.

== Professional career ==
Pre-draft measurables
Height	Weight	40-yard dash	10-yard split	20-yard split	20-yard shuttle	Three-cone drill	Vertical jump	Broad jump	Bench press
6 ft 5 in (1.96 m)	346 lb (157 kg)	4.99 s	1.71 s	2.79 s	4.53 s	7.37 s	32.0 in (0.81 m)	8 ft 9 in (2.67 m)	36 reps
All values from Pro Day

=== Houston Texans ===
Brooks was selected by the Houston Texans in the 3rd round, 76th overall, of the 2012 NFL draft. In his rookie season, Brooks was inactive for the first 10 games before being used as a reserve for the final six games as well as two playoff games. In the 2013 season, he became a starter and remained there throughout his time with the Texans.

=== Philadelphia Eagles ===
On March 9, 2016, Brooks signed a five-year, $40 million contract with the Philadelphia Eagles. He started 14 games at right guard in his first year in Philadelphia.

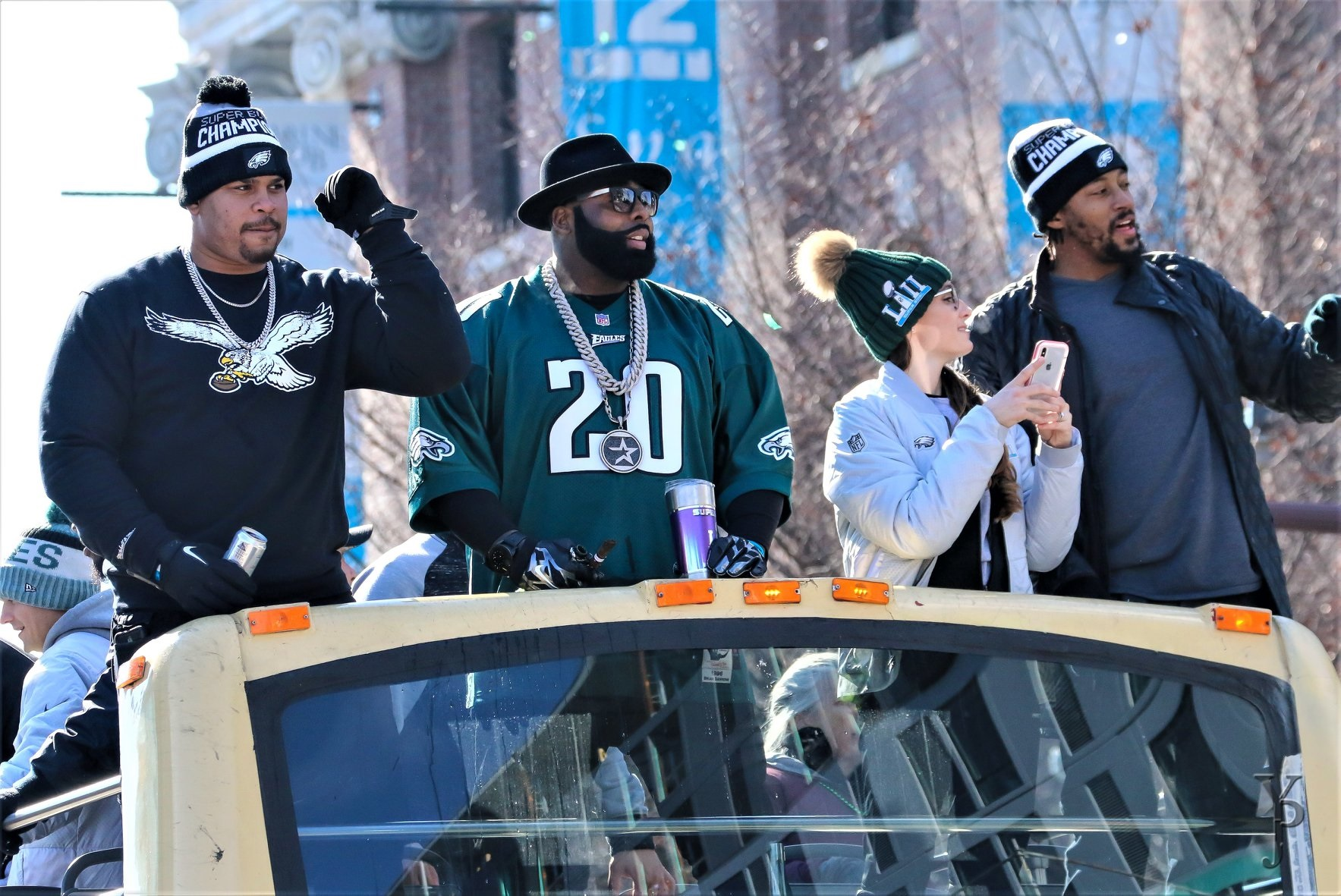
Brooks (left) during the Eagles' Super Bowl LII victory parade

On December 19, 2017, Brooks was named to his first Pro Bowl along with right tackle Lane Johnson after starting all 16 games at right guard. He could not play in the Pro Bowl because of his team advancing to the Super Bowl. Brooks would win his first Super Bowl when the Eagles defeated the New England Patriots in Super Bowl LII by a score of 41–33.

On December 17, 2018, Brooks was named to his second Pro Bowl. That season the Eagles went 9–7 and earned a Wild Card spot. They defeated the Chicago Bears 16–15 in the Wild Card round, then lost 20–14 to the New Orleans Saints in the Divisional round. The loss was costly for Brooks, as he suffered a torn Achilles. He was able to return for the 2019 season, as he also incorporated Kung fu in his off-field training.

Brooks signed a four-year, $54.2 million contract extension through the 2024 season with the Eagles on November 11, 2019. He was named to his third straight Pro Bowl on December 17. On December 29, Brooks suffered a dislocated shoulder in the team's final regular season game against the New York Giants, forcing him to miss the postseason. He was ranked 98th by his fellow players on the NFL Top 100 Players of 2020.

On June 15, 2020, it was announced that Brooks tore his Achilles and would miss the upcoming 2020 season. He was placed on the active/physically unable to perform list at the start of training camp on August 4, 2020, and placed on reserve/PUP at the start of the regular season on September 5. Brooks began practicing with the team again on December 30, but the team did not activate him before the end of the season.

In Week 2 of the 2021 season, Brooks suffered a pectoral strain and was placed on injured reserve on September 21, 2021.

On January 26, 2022, Brooks announced his retirement from the NFL.

== Personal life ==
Brooks was diagnosed with a stress-related anxiety disorder in 2016, which explained his vomit bouts only on game days, even after a stomach ulcer was treated. He is also a Jiu-Jitsu practitioner.

He was the spring 2018 commencement speaker at his alma mater, Miami University.

Brooks currently resides in Medford, New Jersey. After retiring, he enrolled at the Wharton School at the University of Pennsylvania and graduated with an MBA. He is an investment banker with Goldman Sachs.
