= Matt Brown (kick returner) =

American football player (born 1989)

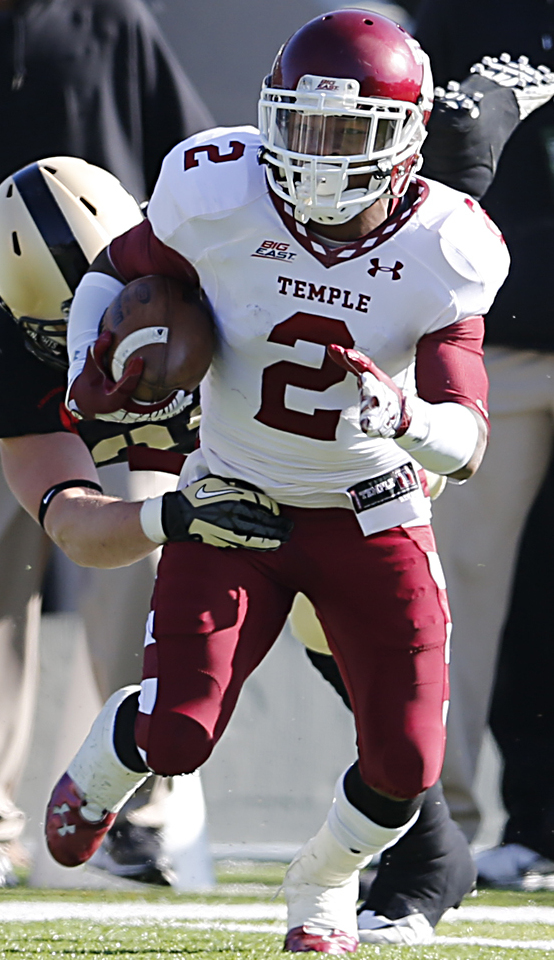
- Brown with Temple in 2012

Profile
- Position: Kick returner

Personal information
- Born: July 28, 1989 (age 37); Baltimore, Maryland, U.S.
- Listed height: 5 ft 5 in (1.65 m)
- Listed weight: 169 lb (77 kg)

Career information
- High school: Peddie School
- College: Temple
- NFL draft: 2013: undrafted

Career history
- Tampa Bay Buccaneers (2013)*; Saskatchewan Roughriders (2013–2014)*; Tri-Cities Fever (2015)*
- * Offseason or practice squad member only

Awards and highlights
- Grey Cup champion (2013); Big East Special Teams Player of the Year (2012); First-team All-Big East (2012)
- Stats at CFL.ca (archive)

Matthew Warren Brown (born July 28, 1989) is an American former football kick returner. He signed with the Tampa Bay Buccaneers as an undrafted free agent following the 2013 NFL draft. He played college football for Temple. He also had brief stints with the Saskatchewan Roughriders of the Canadian Football League (CFL) and Tri-Cities Fever of the Indoor Football League (IFL). With the Roughriders, he won the 101st Grey Cup in 2013.

== Early life ==
Brown was born and grew up in Baltimore, Maryland. His father, Warren Brown, is an attorney and his mother, Lynette, is a beautician. He played in the Northwood Little League (baseball) and the Northwood Youth football league and, despite his small stature, excelled at both.

Brown spent summers at Cushing Academy, a private boarding school in Massachusetts, with his sister Candice.

Brown initially attended Baltimore City College and the private Cardinal Gibbons in his hometown, but transferred to Peddie School, a private boarding school in New Jersey, the next year. He graduated from Peddie in 2008.

With no prospects for a college scholarship in football, Brown attended the Milford Academy in New Berlin, New York, where NFL starters LeSean McCoy and Shonn Greene had played. There, Brown set a school record with nine kickoff-return touchdowns in 12 games.

== College career ==
Brown played college football for the Temple Owls, where he was a punt and kickoff return specialist, wide receiver and, for his first three years, back-up running back to Bernard Pierce. Because of his size, 5 foot, 5 inches tall, no Division I or II schools showed any interest in Brown; even at Temple he was a walk-on and played his first year without a scholarship. Brown returned 83 kick-offs for Temple for 2,068 yards and two touchdowns at 24.9 average yards per kick return. He also had 45 punt returns for 403 yards over the past two seasons.

Brown's best game at Temple came during his sophomore year against Army, when he carried the ball 28 times for 226 yards and 4 touchdowns.

=== 2012 ===
In his senior year, Brown was named the Big East Conference's special teams player of the year and was a 2012 All-Big East First-team player as a coaches' selection. Brown was also named to the 2012 ESPN.com All-Big East Team at return specialist, the 2012 CBSSports.com Big East All-Conference Team and the 2012 first-team All-Big East at kickoff returner by College Sports Madness.

== Professional career ==
=== Tampa Bay Buccaneers ===
Brown attended both the Tampa Bay Buccaneers and the Kansas City Chiefs free agent camps in the spring of 2013, but did not hear back from either. Two weeks later, he was preparing to sign a contract with the Saskatchewan Roughriders of the Canadian Football League, but was denied entry to Canada due to an expired passport. He received a call from the Buccaneers shortly thereafter, and on May 28, 2013, he signed a three-year deal with the Buccaneers. Brown was released on July 23, 2013, after Peyton Hillis signed a one-year deal with the team.

=== Saskatchewan Roughriders ===
On August 5, 2013, Brown signed with the Roughriders. On November 24, 2013, the Roughriders defeated the Hamilton Tiger-Cats 45-23, to win the 101st Grey Cup. Brown lasted on the Roughriders roster until June 7, 2014, but was released without appearing in a game.

== Arrest and criminal conviction ==
On Saint Patrick's Day, March 17, 2015, Brown was arrested on human trafficking and prostitution charges. His alleged victims were aged 14, 16, and 17. He pleaded guilty to a misdemeanor count of prostitution, and was sentenced to two years in prison in 2017.
