= Evan Rodriguez =

American football player (born 1988)

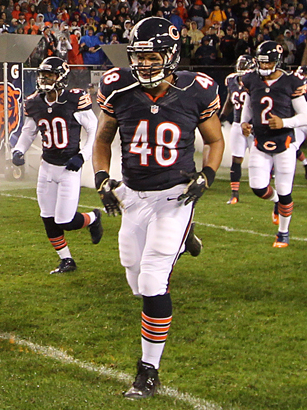
- Rodriguez with the Chicago Bears in 2012

No. 48, 86, 88
- Position: Tight end

Personal information
- Born: September 21, 1988 (age 38); Bronx, New York, U.S.
- Listed height: 6 ft 1 in (1.85 m)
- Listed weight: 242 lb (110 kg)

Career information
- High school: North Bergen (North Bergen, New Jersey)
- College: West Virginia (2007); Temple (2008–2011)
- NFL draft: 2012: 4th round, 111th overall pick

Career history
- Chicago Bears (2012); Miami Dolphins (2013)*; Buffalo Bills (2013); Tampa Bay Buccaneers (2014); San Antonio Commanders (2019); Seattle Dragons (2020)
- * Offseason or practice squad member only

Awards and highlights
- 2× First-team All-MAC (2010, 2011)

Career NFL statistics
- Receptions: 4
- Receiving yards: 21
- Stats at Pro Football Reference

Evan Junior Rodriguez (born September 21, 1988) is an American former professional football player who was a tight end in the National Football League (NFL). He played college football for the Temple Owls.

Rodriguez grew up in North Bergen, New Jersey and played football at North Bergen High School.

== Professional career ==
Pre-draft measurables
Height	Weight	40-yard dash	20-yard shuttle	Three-cone drill	Vertical jump	Broad jump	Bench press
6 ft 1 in (1.85 m)	242 lb (110 kg)	4.58 s	4.28 s	6.94 s	36.0 in (0.91 m)	9 ft 11 in (3.02 m)	18 reps
All values from the NFL Combine

=== Chicago Bears ===
He was selected in the fourth round with the 111th overall pick in the 2012 NFL draft by the Chicago Bears.

On May 8, Rodriguez signed a 4-year contract with the Chicago Bears. In 2012, Rodriguez appeared in 12 games with five starts, catching four passes for 21 yards.

On June 10, 2013, Rodriguez was released.

=== Miami Dolphins ===
On June 11, 2013, Rodriguez was signed by the Miami Dolphins. Rodriguez was cut from the Miami Dolphins on September 1, 2013.

=== Buffalo Bills ===
The Buffalo Bills signed him on November 4, 2013. On August 29, 2014, they released him in their finals cuts for the 53-man roster.

=== Tampa Bay Buccaneers ===
Tampa Bay Buccaneers signed him to their practice squad on November 25, 2014, after Jorvorskie Lane was ruled out for the rest of the season.

=== San Antonio Commanders ===
In December 2018, Rodriguez signed with the San Antonio Commanders of the Alliance of American Football (AAF). The league ceased operations in April 2019.

=== Seattle Dragons ===
Rodriguez was drafted in the 2020 XFL draft by the Seattle Dragons of the XFL. He had his contract terminated when the league suspended operations on April 10, 2020.

== Personal life ==
During his time at West Virginia, Rodriguez was charged with felony assault in relation to a physical altercation he had with a female residence hall adviser; the charge was later reduced to misdemeanor disturbance and trespassing. He was later arrested for disorderly conduct at Temple in April 2009. On March 21, 2013, Rodriguez was arrested in Miami Beach, Florida, for disorderly intoxication and resisting a police officer without violence. Rodriguez had been in Miami to train with some of his teammates, but after his arrest, faced a $1,500 bail. Later in the year, on May 31, Rodriguez was arrested for driving under the influence, speeding and improper lane switching on Interstate 90 in Illinois.
