= Joel Nielsen =

Joel Nielsen is an American sports administrator originally from Latimer, Iowa. Nielsen served as the athletic director for Kent State University in Kent, Ohio between 2010 and 2021. Prior to his appointment at Kent State, he served as athletic director at the University of South Dakota from 2003 to 2010 and at Colorado College from 2001 to 2003. He also served as associate athletic director at Wake Forest University from 1993 to 2001 and assistant athletic director at Illinois State University from 1992 to 1993. From 1990 to 1991 he was athletic development assistant at Northern Illinois University. He is an alumnus of Minnesota State University, Mankato, where he played football and baseball and earned both his bachelor's and master's degrees. In 2025, he was inducted into the Minnesota State Athletics Hall of Fame.

Joel currently serves as a higher education compliance consultant for Bricker Graydon Wyatt, a law firm based in Columbus, Ohio.

== Background ==
Nielsen is a native of Latimer, Iowa and attended college at Minnesota State University, Mankato, in Mankato, Minnesota. At MNSU, he played for the Minnesota State Mavericks football and baseball teams. He earned a Bachelor of Science degree in business finance in 1985 and a Master of Arts degree in sports administration in 1991 and served as a graduate assistant for the Mavericks football team in 1989–90.

Nielsen began his career in sports administration at Northern Illinois University in DeKalb, Illinois, serving as an athletic development assistant in the NIU athletic department from 1990 to 1991. In 1991, he took the position of assistant athletic director at Illinois State University in Normal, Illinois, working in ISU athletics until 1992.

In 1993, Nielsen took the position of associate athletic director at Wake Forest University in Winston-Salem, North Carolina. At Wake, he was in charge of the administration and management of external relations for Wake Forest Demon Deacons of the Atlantic Coast Conference, a position he held until 2001. He then moved to Colorado Springs, Colorado, to serve as assistant athletic director at Colorado College, a school competing in the NCAA Division III level except in men's ice hockey and women's soccer, which compete at the Division I level.

The University of South Dakota hired Nielsen as director of athletics in 2003. While at USD, Nielsen oversaw the transition of the South Dakota Coyotes to Division I and the Football Championship Subdivision from Division II. Nielsen also played a key role in securing membership for all sports except football into the Summit League in 2010, with competition beginning in 2012. South Dakota Coyotes football joined the Great West Conference in 2007 before they accepted an invitation shortly after Nielsen's departure in 2010 to join the Missouri Valley Football Conference effective in 2012.

Kent State University announced the hiring of Nielsen as director of athletics on March 25, 2010, and he officially began his tenure on May 15, succeeding Laing Kennedy, who had served as Kent State athletic director since 1994. Under Nielsen, the Golden Flashes have had a number of notable accomplishments. In 2012, the men's golf team finish 5th nationally, the football team won the most games in program history and qualified for their first bowl appearance since 1972, and the baseball team advanced to the College World Series. Kent State won the Mid-American Conference Reese Trophy for best men's athletic season in 2011, 2012, and 2013, and the Jacoby Trophy for best women's athletic season in 2014. Additionally in 2014, the Golden Flashes finished as the top MAC program in the Director's Cup standings for the 14th time in 15 years and 17th time in the 21 years the cup has been awarded.

== Personal life ==
Nielsen resides in Kent, Ohio with his wife Sharon and daughters Kasey, Kelly, and Kory. Sharon Nielsen played collegiate golf at Northern Illinois University and all three Nielsen daughters are golfers and were key members of the girls golf team at Theodore Roosevelt High School in Kent to lead the Rough Riders to a sixth-place finish at the state tournament in 2013 and a fifth-place finish in 2014. Kasey and Kelly committed to the Kent State women's golf program in 2013 and began play for the Flashes in 2015. All three sisters competed in the Northern Ohio Junior PGA Tournament in 2015 with Kasey winning the tournament for the second-straight year, Kelly finishing third, and Kory finishing 5th.
