= Bernard Pierce =

American football player (born 1991)

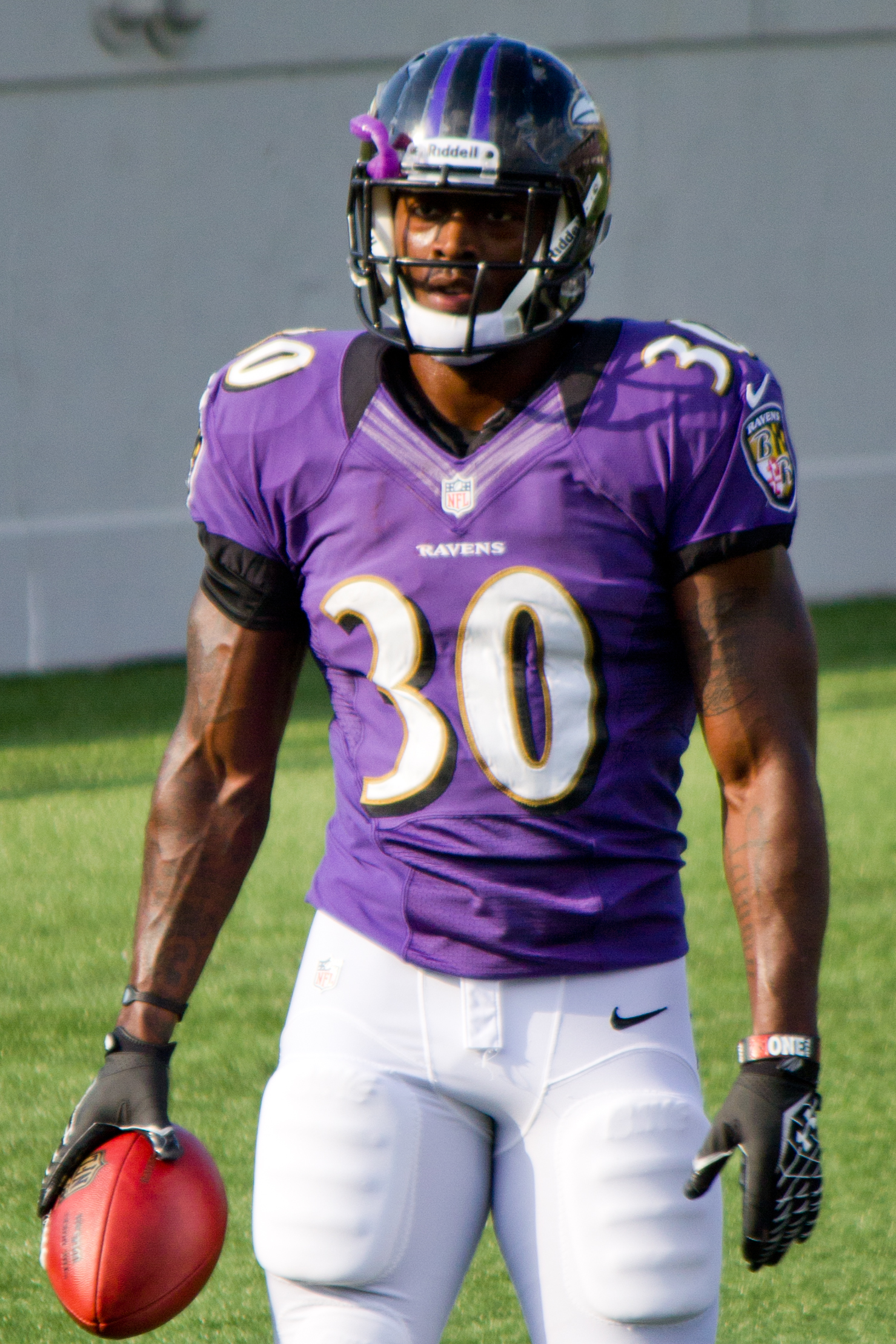
- Pierce with the Baltimore Ravens in 2012

No. 30
- Position: Running back

Personal information
- Born: May 10, 1991 (age 35); Ardmore, Pennsylvania, U.S.
- Listed height: 6 ft 0 in (1.83 m)
- Listed weight: 222 lb (101 kg)

Career information
- High school: Glen Mills Reformatory School (Glen Mills, Pennsylvania)
- College: Temple (2009–2011)
- NFL draft: 2012: 3rd round, 84th overall pick

Career history
- Baltimore Ravens (2012–2014); Jacksonville Jaguars (2015); New York Jets (2016)*; Denver Broncos (2017)*
- * Offseason or practice squad member only

Awards and highlights
- Super Bowl champion (XLVII); MAC Freshman of the Year (2009); 3× First-team All-MAC (2009, 2010, 2011)

Career NFL statistics
- Rushing attempts: 359
- Rushing yards: 1,345
- Receptions: 32
- Receiving yards: 171
- Total touchdowns: 5
- Stats at Pro Football Reference

Bernard Hayward Pierce (born May 10, 1991) is an American former professional football player who was a running back in the National Football League (NFL). He played college football for the Temple Owls. He was selected by the Baltimore Ravens in the third round of the 2012 NFL draft.

== Early life ==
Pierce attended Glen Mills Schools in Glen Mills, Pennsylvania. He played football and ran track. Pierce also attended Welsh Valley Middle School in Penn Valley, Pennsylvania. He was a second-team Class AAAA All-State selection as a junior. As a senior, he rushed for 1,578 yards and 26 touchdowns, and also scored five two-point conversions. He led Delaware County with 143.4 rushing yards per game.

Pierce was also on the school's track team, where he competed as a sprinter. He placed third in the 60 meters at the 2009 Indoor State Championships, recording a personal-best time of 6.98 seconds. As a senior, he ran a career-best time of 10.6 seconds in the 100 meters, the fastest time in the state that year. He also ran the 200 meters in 22.34 seconds.

== College career ==
Following his high school career, Pierce signed on to play football at Temple. While at Temple, Pierce was a student in the School of Communications and Theater and majored in communications.

In the 2009 season, Pierce won the Mid-American Conference (MAC) freshman of the year award after rushing for 1,361 yards and 16 touchdowns. He had six games going over 100 rushing yards and two going over 200 rushing yards. He led the MAC in rushing yards as a freshman.

After a strong week 3 performance against Connecticut, Pierce was named MAC Performer of the Week. He rushed for 169 yards and three touchdowns in the game. In the 2010 season, Pierce had 154 carries for 728 yards and ten touchdowns while sharing the backfield with Matt Brown.

In a blowout win over Maryland, Pierce scored a career-high five touchdowns in the 38–7 win. He finished the game with 147 yards on 32 carries to go along with the five scores. That season, Pierce earned Eastern College Athletic Conference (ECAC) FBS Offensive Player of the Year honors and led Temple to its first bowl game win in 32 years, a 37–15 victory over the Wyoming Cowboys in the New Mexico Bowl. He finished the 2011 season with 273 carries for 1,481 yards and 27 touchdowns. He led the MAC in rushing yards, rushing touchdowns, and points scored.

== Professional career ==
Pre-draft measurables
Height	Weight	40-yard dash	10-yard split	20-yard split	20-yard shuttle	Three-cone drill	Vertical jump	Broad jump	Bench press
6 ft 0 in (1.83 m)	218 lb (99 kg)	4.45 s	1.58 s	2.53 s	4.28 s	7.07 s	36.5 in (0.93 m)	10 ft 3 in (3.12 m)	17 reps
All values from Central Florida Pro Day.

=== Baltimore Ravens ===
==== 2012 season ====
The Baltimore Ravens traded up to take Pierce in the third round of the 2012 NFL Draft with the 84th overall pick. Pierce became a great complement to starting running back Ray Rice. Pierce scored his first touchdown of his professional career against the Cleveland Browns in Week 9 on November 4, 2012, on a 12-yard run. In Week 16, he ran for 123 yards on 14 carries against the New York Giants, including a 78-yard run from scrimmage. On January 6, 2013, in the Wild Card playoff game against the Indianapolis Colts, he ran for 103 yards on 13 carries. On February 3, 2013, the Ravens defeated the San Francisco 49ers 34–31 in Super Bowl XLVII, earning Pierce his first Super Bowl ring in his rookie year. He rushed for 33 yards on 12 attempts in the win.

==== 2013 season ====
Pierce scored his second career rushing touchdown on a 5-yard run in Week 2 against the Cleveland Browns. He would then get a third rushing touchdown the next week against the Houston Texans in a 30–9 victory. He finished the 2013 season with 152 carries for 436 rushing yards and two rushing touchdowns to go with 20 receptions for 104 receiving yards.

==== 2014 season ====
Bernard became a backup — along with Lorenzo Taliaferro — to Justin Forsett for the Ravens during the 2014 NFL season after Ray Rice was cut and suspended for an off-season altercation with his wife. He scored his first rushing touchdown of the season against the Tampa Bay Buccaneers. In the 2014 season, Pierce finished with 93 carries for 366 yards and two touchdowns. In the Wild Card Round win over the Pittsburgh Steelers, he had a five-yard rushing touchdown.

On March 18, 2015, Pierce was pulled over by police at 2am for speeding at 55 mph in a zone with a 35 mph speed limit. He failed the subsequent field sobriety test, as he was unable to walk in a straight line for more than two yards. Pierce was subsequently released from the Ravens later that day.

=== Jacksonville Jaguars ===
On March 19, 2015, Pierce was claimed off waivers by the Jacksonville Jaguars. He was placed on injured reserve on December 7, 2015. He appeared in seven games for the Jaguars in the 2015 season.

=== New York Jets ===
Pierce was signed by the New York Jets on July 27, 2016. The Jets placed Pierce on their injured reserve list on August 16, 2016. He had been battling a hamstring injury throughout training camp. The Jets and Pierce reached an injury settlement and he was released from the reserve list on August 20, 2016.

=== Denver Broncos ===
Pierce signed a reserve/future contract with the Broncos on January 2, 2017. On August 21, 2017, he was released by the Broncos.

=== Flag football ===
In 2018, Pierce played as a member of the Roadrunners led by retired quarterback, Michael Vick, in the American Flag Football League.

== NFL career statistics ==
Year	Team	GP	Rushing					Receiving					Fumbles	
Year	Team	GP	Att	Yds	Avg	Lng	TD	Rec	Yds	Avg	Lng	TD	Fum	Lost
2012	BAL	16	108	532	4.9	78	1	7	47	6.7	11	0	0	0
2013	BAL	16	152	436	2.9	28	2	20	104	5.2	15	0	0	0
2014	BAL	13	93	366	3.9	28	2	2	13	6.5	7	0	1	0
2015	JAX	7	6	11	1.8	4	0	3	7	3.5	7	0	0	0
Career		52	359	1,345	3.7	78	5	32	171	5.3	15	0	1	0

== See also ==
- List of Division I FBS rushing touchdown leaders
