= Central Michigan Chippewas football statistical leaders =

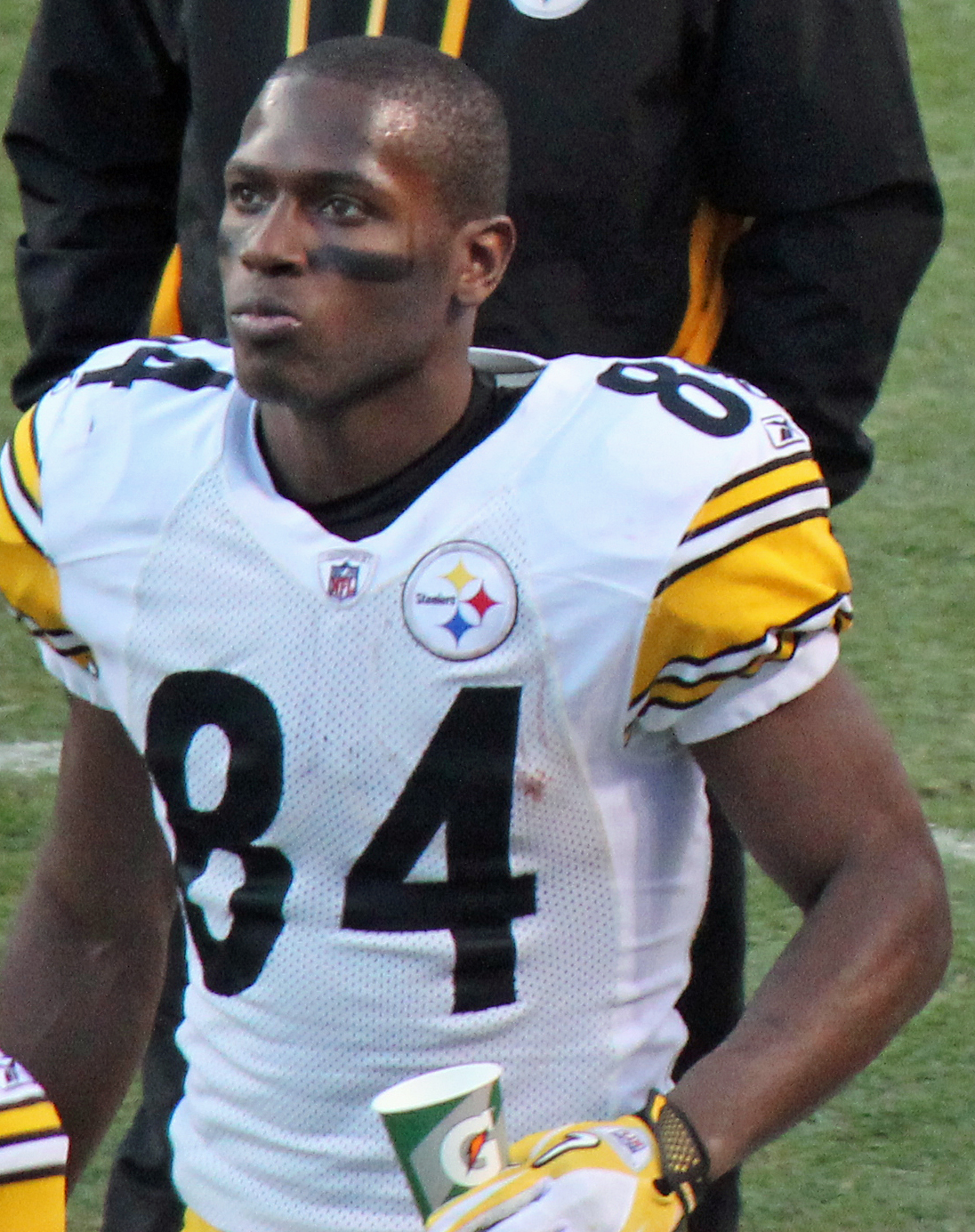
Antonio Brown is the Chippewas' career leader in receptions, and his three seasons at Central Michigan are the three highest single seasons on the receptions list. He also holds the single-game record in receptions.

The Central Michigan Chippewas football statistical leaders are individual statistical leaders of the Central Michigan Chippewas football program in various categories, including passing, rushing, receiving, total offense, defensive stats, and kicking. Within those areas, the lists identify single-game, single-season, and career leaders. The Chippewas represent Central Michigan University in the NCAA's Mid-American Conference.

Although Central Michigan began competing in intercollegiate football in 1896, the school's official record book considers the "modern era" to have begun in 1951. Records from before this year are often incomplete and inconsistent, and they are generally not included in these lists.

These lists are dominated by more recent players for several reasons:

- Since 1951, seasons have increased from 10 games to 11 and then 12 games in length.
- The NCAA didn't allow freshmen to play varsity football until 1972 (with the exception of the World War II years), allowing players to have four-year careers.
- Bowl games only began counting toward single-season and career statistics in 2002. The Chippewas have played in eight bowl games since this decision, allowing many recent players an extra game to accumulate statistics.
- Similarly, Central Michigan has played in the MAC Championship Game three times (2006, 2007, and 2009), giving yet another game to players in those seasons.

These lists are updated through the end of the 2025 season.

== Passing ==
=== Passing yards ===
Career
Rank	Player	Yards	Years
1	Dan LeFevour	12,905	2006 2007 2008 2009
2	Cooper Rush	12,894	2013 2014 2015 2016
3	Ryan Radcliff	9,917	2009 2010 2011 2012
4	Jeff Bender	6,528	1988 1989 1990 1991
5	Pete Shepherd	5,754	1997 1998 1999 2000
6	Daniel Richardson	5,391	2019 2020 2021 2022
7	Derrick Vickers	5,358	2000 2001 2002 2003
8	Kent Smith	5,179	2002 2004 2005
9	Joe Youngblood	4,718	1990 1991 1992 1993
10	Chad Darnell	4,705	1994 1995 1996

Single season
Rank	Player	Yards	Year
1	Cooper Rush	3,848	2015
2	Dan LeFevour	3,652	2007
3	Cooper Rush	3,540	2016
4	Dan LeFevour	3,438	2009
5	Ryan Radcliff	3,358	2010
6	Ryan Radcliff	3,286	2011
7	Shane Morris	3,237	2017
8	Ryan Radcliff	3,158	2012
9	Cooper Rush	3,157	2014
10	Dan LeFevour	3,031	2006

Single game
Rank	Player	Yards	Years	Opponent
1	Cooper Rush	493	2014	Western Kentucky
2	Brian Brunner	485	2008	Indiana
3	Shane Morris	467	2017	Kansas
4	Kent Smith	460	2005	Western Michigan
5	Ryan Radcliff	436	2011	Ball State
6	Chad Darnell	435	1996	Bowling Green
7	Cooper Rush	430	2015	Syracuse
8	Daniel Richardson	424	2022	Oklahoma State
9	Tim Crowley	412	1997	Eastern Michigan
10	Cooper Rush	402	2016	Virginia

=== Passing touchdowns ===
Career
Rank	Player	TDs	Years
1	Dan LeFevour	102	2006 2007 2008 2009
2	Cooper Rush	90	2013 2014 2015 2016
3	Ryan Radcliff	63	2009 2010 2011 2012
4	Daniel Richardson	43	2019 2020 2021 2022
5	Jeff Bender	38	1988 1989 1990 1991
6	Joe Youngblood	35	1990 1991 1992 1993
7	Derrick Vickers	34	2000 2001 2002 2003
8	Chad Darnell	33	1994 1995 1996
	Kent Smith	33	2002 2004 2005
10	Andy MacDonald	27	1950 1951
	Shane Morris	27	2017

Single season
Rank	Player	TDs	Year
1	Dan LeFevour	28	2009
2	Dan LeFevour	27	2007
	Cooper Rush	27	2014
	Shane Morris	27	2017
5	Dan LeFevour	26	2006
6	Ryan Radcliff	25	2011
	Cooper Rush	25	2015
8	Daniel Richardson	24	2021
9	Ryan Radcliff	23	2012
	Cooper Rush	23	2016

Single game
Rank	Player	TDs	Years	Opponent
1	Cooper Rush	7	2014	Western Kentucky
2	Cooper Rush	6	2016	UNLV
3	Bill Kelly	5	1929	Toledo
	Kent Smith	5	2004	Eastern Michigan
	Dan LeFevour	5	2007	Ball State

== Rushing ==
=== Rushing yards ===
Career
Rank	Player	Yards	Years
1	Curtis Adams	4,162	1981 1982 1983 1984
2	Walt Hodges	3,886	1973 1974 1975 1976
3	Jesse Lakes	3,702	1969 1970 1971
4	Brian Pruitt	3,693	1992 1993 1994
5	Eric Flowers	3,122	1996 1997 1998 1999
6	Lew Nichols III	3,061	2019 2020 2021 2022
7	Walt Beach	2,968	1956 1957 1958 1959
8	Dan LeFevour	2,948	2006 2007 2008 2009
9	Willie Todd	2,928	1978 1979 1980 1981
10	Ontario Sneed	2,863	2005 2006 2007 2008

Single season
Rank	Player	Yards	Year
1	Brian Pruitt	1,890	1994
2	Lew Nichols III	1,848	2021
3	Silas Massey	1,544	1996
4	Chuck Markey	1,513	1972
5	Zurlon Tipton	1,492	2012
6	Walt Hodges	1,463	1974
7	Billy Smith	1,440	1991
8	Curtis Adams	1,431	1983
9	Robbie Mixon	1,363	2002
10	Eric Flowers	1,302	1998

Single game
Rank	Player	Yards	Years	Opponent
1	Robbie Mixon	377	2002	Eastern Michigan
2	Brian Pruitt	356	1994	Toledo
3	Jesse Lakes	343	1969	UW-Milwaukee
4	Bert Emanuel Jr.	293	2022	Buffalo
5	Silas Massey	292	1996	Kent State
6	Brian Pruitt	274	1994	UNLV
7	Thomas Rawls	270	2014	Northern Illinois
8	Jim Podoley	258	1954	Northern Iowa
9	Eric Flowers	253	1998	Ball State
10	Donnie Riley	243	1988	Akron
	Zurlon Tipton	243	2012	Akron

=== Rushing touchdowns ===
Career
Rank	Player	TDs	Years
1	Dan LeFevour	47	2006 2007 2008 2009
2	Curtis Adams	43	1981 1982 1983 1984
3	Eric Flowers	35	1996 1997 1998 1999
4	Willie Todd	34	1978 1979 1980 1981
	Zurlon Tipton	34	2010 2011 2012 2013
6	Jesse Lakes	33	1969 1970 1971
7	Brian Pruitt	31	1992 1993 1994
8	Jonathan Ward	28	2016 2017 2018 2019
9	Walt Hodges	27	1973 1974 1975 1976
10	Ontario Sneed	26	2005 2006 2007 2008
	Lew Nichols III	26	2019 2020 2021 2022

Single season
Rank	Player	TDs	Year
1	Brian Pruitt	20	1994
2	Dan LeFevour	19	2007
	Zurlon Tipton	19	2012
4	Silas Massey	16	1996
	Eric Flowers	16	1998
	Lew Nichols III	16	2021
7	Curtis Adams	15	1983
	Jonathan Ward	15	2019
9	Jesse Lakes	14	1970
	Jim Sandy	14	1972
	Rodney Stevenson	14	1986

== Receiving ==
=== Receptions ===
Career
Rank	Player	Rec	Years
1	Antonio Brown	305	2007 2008 2009
2	Bryan Anderson	290	2006 2007 2008 2009
3	Cody Wilson	230	2009 2010 2011 2012
4	Titus Davis	204	2011 2012 2013 2014
5	Reggie Allen	192	1995 1996 1997 1998
6	Bryan Schorman	187	1995 1996 1997 1998
7	Kalil Pimpleton	170	2019 2020 2021
8	Justin Harper	167	2002 2003 2004 2005
9	Ontario Sneed	157	2005 2006 2007 2008
	Corey Willis	157	2014 2015 2016 2017

Single season
Rank	Player	Rec	Year
1	Antonio Brown	110	2009
2	Antonio Brown	102	2007
3	Antonio Brown	93	2008
4	Bryan Anderson	90	2007
5	Cody Wilson	83	2010
6	Kalil Pimpleton	82	2019
7	Cody Wilson	74	2012
8	Bryan Anderson	73	2006
9	Corey Willis	71	2016
10	Reggie Allen	66	1996

Single game
Rank	Player	Rec	Years	Opponent
1	Antonio Brown	15	2007	Akron
2	Justin Harper	14	2005	Western Michigan
3	Antonio Brown	13	2009	Toledo
	Antonio Brown	13	2009	Troy
	Cody Wilson	13	2010	Navy
6	Terrance McMillan	12	1992	Miami (Ohio)
	Cody Wilson	12	2010	Western Michigan

=== Receiving yards ===
Career
Rank	Player	Yards	Years
1	Titus Davis	3,700	2011 2012 2013 2014
2	Bryan Anderson	3,648	2006 2007 2008 2009
3	Reggie Allen	3,242	1995 1996 1997 1998
4	Antonio Brown	3,199	2007 2008 2009
5	Bryan Schorman	2,968	1995 1996 1997 1998
6	Cody Wilson	2,729	2009 2010 2011 2012
7	Corey Willis	2,390	2014 2015 2016 2017
8	Damien Linson	2,279	2003 2004 2005 2006
9	Kalil Pimpleton	2,131	2019 2020 2021
10	Ken Ealy	2,064	1988 1989 1990 1991

Single season
Rank	Player	Yards	Year
1	Reggie Allen	1,229	1996
2	Antonio Brown	1,198	2009
3	Cody Wilson	1,137	2010
4	Bryan Anderson	1,132	2007
5	Titus Davis	1,109	2013
6	Corey Willis	1,087	2016
7	Jammarl O'Neal	1,085	1999
8	Antonio Brown	1,003	2007
9	Antonio Brown	998	2008
10	Titus Davis	980	2014

Single game
Rank	Player	Yards	Years	Opponent
1	Norm Tellar	284	1929	Toledo
2	Reggie Allen	229	1996	Bowling Green
3	Titus Davis	208	2012	Western Michigan
4	Damien Linson	204	2005	Miami (Ohio)
5	David Blackburn	194	2011	Ball State
6	Titus Davis	192	2011	Kent State
7	Damien Linson	191	2006	Ohio
8	Greg Hoefler	187	1966	Wayne State
	Reggie Allen	187	1996	Western Michigan
	Titus Davis	187	2013	Ball State

=== Receiving touchdowns ===
Career
Rank	Player	TDs	Years
1	Titus Davis	37	2011 2012 2013 2014
2	Bryan Anderson	28	2006 2007 2008 2009
3	Corey Willis	23	2014 2015 2016 2017
4	Antonio Brown	22	2007 2008 2009
5	John DeBoer	19	1982 1983 1984 1985
	Reggie Allen	19	1995 1996 1997 1998
7	Damien Linson	17	2003 2004 2005 2006
8	Ken Ealy	16	1988 1989 1990 1991
9	Greg Hoefler	15	1965 1966 1967
	Kito Poblah	15	2007 2008 2009 2010
	Jacorey Sullivan	15	2018 2019 2020 2021

Single season
Rank	Player	TDs	Year
1	Titus Davis	13	2014
2	Bryan Anderson	10	2007
	Jacorey Sullivan	10	2021
4	John DeBoer	9	1984
	Ken Ealy	9	1990
	Reggie Allen	9	1996
	Antonio Brown	9	2009
	Corey Willis	9	2016
	Corey Willis	9	2017
10	Greg Hoefler	8	1966
	Titus Davis	8	2011
	Dallas Dixon	8	2021

Single game
Rank	Player	TDs	Years	Opponent
1	Titus Davis	4	2014	Western Kentucky
2	Norm Tellar	3	1929	Toledo
	John DeBoer	3	1984	Northern Michigan
	Ken Ealy	3	1990	Kent State
	Justin Harper	3	2004	Eastern Michigan
	Ontario Sneed	3	2006	Temple
	Bryan Anderson	3	2007	Purdue
	Titus Davis	3	2014	Miami (Ohio)

== Total offense ==
Total offense is the sum of passing and rushing statistics. It does not include receiving or returns.

=== Total offense yards ===
Career
Rank	Player	Yards	Years
1	Dan LeFevour	15,853	2006 2007 2008 2009
2	Cooper Rush	12,786	2013 2014 2015 2016
3	Ryan Radcliff	9,747	2009 2010 2011 2012
4	Jeff Bender	6,518	1988 1989 1990 1991
5	Kent Smith	6,079	2002 2004 2005
6	Pete Shepherd	5,747	1997 1998 1999 2000
7	Derrick Vickers	5,747	2000 2001 2002 2003
8	Daniel Richardson	5,287	2019 2020 2021 2022
9	Chad Darnell	4,925	1994 1995 1996
10	Joe Youngblood	4,585	1990 1991 1992 1993

Single season
Rank	Player	Yards	Year
1	Dan LeFevour	4,774	2007
2	Dan LeFevour	4,151	2009
3	Cooper Rush	3,896	2015
4	Dan LeFevour	3,552	2006
5	Cooper Rush	3,519	2016
6	Dan LeFevour	3,376	2008
7	Shane Morris	3,330	2017
8	Ryan Radcliff	3,259	2010
9	Kent Smith	3,242	2005
10	Ryan Radcliff	3,217	2011

Single game
Rank	Player	Yards	Years	Opponent
1	Cooper Rush	519	2014	Western Kentucky
2	Dan LeFevour	514	2007	Akron
3	Dan LeFevour	506	2007	Ball State
4	Shane Morris	499	2017	Kansas
5	Kent Smith	480	2005	Western Michigan
6	Kent Smith	478	2005	Miami (Ohio)
7	Brian Brunner	460	2008	Indiana
8	Kent Smith	446	2004	Toledo
9	Dan LeFevour	434	2007	Kent State
10	Chad Darnell	429	1996	Bowling Green

=== Touchdowns responsible for ===
"Touchdowns responsible for" is the NCAA's official term for combined passing and rushing touchdowns.

Career
Rank	Player	TDs	Years
1	Dan LeFevour	149	2006 2007 2008 2009
2	Cooper Rush	95	2013 2014 2015 2016
3	Ryan Radcliff	65	2009 2010 2011 2012
4	Kent Smith	51	2002 2004 2005
5	Curtis Adams	44	1981 1982 1983 1984
	Daniel Richardson	44	2019 2020 2021 2022
7	Jeff Bender	42	1988 1989 1990 1991
8	Derrick Vickers	39	2000 2001 2002 2003
9	Chad Darnell	38	1994 1995 1996
10	Joe Youngblood	36	1990 1991 1992 1993

Single season
Rank	Player	TDs	Year
1	Dan LeFevour	46	2007
2	Dan LeFevour	43	2009
3	Dan LeFevour	33	2006
4	Shane Morris	30	2017
5	Cooper Rush	28	2015
6	Dan LeFevour	27	2008
7	Cooper Rush	27	2014
8	Kent Smith	26	2004
9	Ryan Radcliff	25	2011
10	Chad Darnell	24	1996
	Daniel Richardson	24	2021

== Defense ==
=== Interceptions ===
Career
Rank	Player	Ints	Years
1	Jim Bowman	16	1981 1982 1983 1984
2	Jamie Gent	15	1962 1963 1964 1965
3	Steve Bograkos	14	1972 1973 1974
	David Johnson	14	1987 1988 1989 1990
5	Joe Kellogg	13	1984 1985 1986 1987
6	Robert Jackson	12	1977 1978 1979 1980
7	Howard Young	11	1984 1985 1986 1987
	Quincy Wright	11	1993 1994 1995 1996
	Tedaro France	11	1998 1999 2000 2001
	Josh Cox	11	2014 2015 2016 2017

Single season
Rank	Player	Ints	Year
1	Jim Bowman	8	1983
2	John Blackstock	6	1962
	Jamie Gent	6	1963
	Paul Fleszar	6	1975
	Howard Young	6	1987
	David Johnson	6	1988

Single game
Rank	Player	Ints	Years	Opponent
1	Steve Bograkos	3	1972	Indiana State
	Josh Gordy	3	2007	Army

=== Tackles ===
Career
Rank	Player	Tackles	Years
1	Brian Leigeb	490	1997 1998 1999 2000
2	Red Keith	474	2004 2005 2006 2007
3	Nick Bellore	472	2007 2008 2009 2010
4	Ray Bentley	443	1979 1980 1981 1982
5	James King	408	2001 2002 2003 2004
6	Rich Curtiss	402	1987 1988 1989 1990
7	Justin Cherocci	399	2011 2012 2013 2014
8	Bryan Gross	396	1976 1977 1978
9	Mike Bevier	352	1980 1981 1982 1983 1984
	Shawn Williams	352	1995 1996 1997 1998

Single season
Rank	Player	Tackles	Year
1	Ray Bentley	173	1982
2	Malik Fountain	155	2018
3	Jim Schulte	151	1973
4	Mike Bevier	148	1984
	Red Keith	148	2007
	Nick Bellore	148	2008
7	Brian Leigeb	147	2000
8	Ray Bentley	146	1981
9	Bill Schmidt	144	1974
10	James King	143	2003

Single game
Rank	Player	Tackles	Years	Opponent
1	Cecil (Jack)Baucus	35	1959	Northern Illinois
2	Ray Bentley	23	1980	Bowling Green
	Cory Gildersleeve	23	1995	Eastern Michigan
	Rodrico Epps	23	2000	Ball State

=== Sacks ===
Career
Rank	Player	Sacks	Years
1	Dan Bazuin	35.0	2003 2004 2005 2006
2	Joe Ostman	27.0	2013 2014 2015 2016 2017
3	Frank Zombo	25.0	2006 2007 2008 2009
4	Jon McCall	22.0	1996 1997 1998
5	Mike Nettie	21.0	1989 1990 1991 1992
6	Michael Heldman	19.5	2021 2022 2023 2024 2025
7	Pat Brackett	18.0	1981 1982 1983 1984
8	Bubba Hester	17.0	1994 1995 1996
9	Troy Hairston II	15.5	2018 2019 2020 2021
10	Phil Zielinski	15.0	1984 1985 1986 1987
	Mark Dennis	15.0	1987 1988 1989
	Mike Kyler	15.0	1990 1991 1992 1993
	Thomas Incoom	15.0	2021 2022

Single season
Rank	Player	Sacks	Year
1	Dan Bazuin	16.0	2005
2	Joe Ostman	14.0	2017
3	Thomas Incoom	11.5	2022
4	Michael Heldman	10.5	2025
5	Dan Bazuin	10.0	2006
6	Kevin Egnatuk	9.0	1983
	Mike Nettie	9.0	1991
	Jon McCall	9.0	1998
	Joe Adam	9.0	1999
	Frank Zombo	9.0	2008

== Kicking ==
=== Field goals made ===
Career
Rank	Player	FGs	Years
1	Kevin Nicholl	56	1986 1987 1988 1989
2	Rade Savich	49	1975 1976 1977 1978
3	Chuck Selinger	43	1990 1991 1992 1993
4	Andrew Aguila	42	2007 2008 2009
5	Paul Savich	39	1998 1999 2000 2001

Single season
Rank	Player	FGs	Year
1	Kevin Nicholl	20	1989
2	Andrew Aguila	17	2009
	Marshall Meeder	17	2021
4	Kevin Nicholl	16	1987
	Andrew Aguila	16	2008
	Brian Eavey	16	2015
	Tristan Mattson	16	2024
8	Rade Savich	15	1978
	Chuck Selinger	15	1991
	David Harman	15	2012

Single game
Rank	Player	FGs	Years	Opponent
1	Andrew Aguila	5	2009	Troy
