= List of Central Michigan Chippewas in the NFL draft =

This is a list of Central Michigan Chippewas football players in the NFL draft.

== Key ==
B	Back	K	Kicker	NT	Nose tackle
C	Center	LB	Linebacker	FB	Fullback
DB	Defensive back	P	Punter	HB	Halfback
DE	Defensive end	QB	Quarterback	WR	Wide receiver
DT	Defensive tackle	RB	Running back	G	Guard
E	End	T	Offensive tackle	TE	Tight end

== Selections ==
Year	Round	Pick	Overall	Player	Team	Position
1946	18	7	167	Ben Wall	Detroit Lions	B
1948	29	2	267	Tony Pabalis	Detroit Lions	B
1952	18	5	210	Andy MacDonald	Pittsburgh Steelers	B
1956	24	1	278	Jarv Walz	Detroit Lions	E
1956	30	10	359	Dick Kackmeister	Los Angeles Rams	C
1957	4	3	40	Jim Podoley	Washington Redskins	B
1958	16	12	193	Gordon Ringquist	Detroit Lions	T
1958	26	8	309	Bob Grimes	Baltimore Colts	T
1960	15	12	180	Walter Beach	New York Giants	DB
1965	20	13	279	Frank Goldberg	Cleveland Browns	LB
1968	9	12	231	Billy Sinkule	St. Louis Cardinals	DE
1970	15	5	369	Dave Farris	Buffalo Bills	TE
1971	13	22	334	Mick Natzel	Oakland Raiders	DB
1972	13	7	319	Jesse Lakes	Green Bay Packers	RB
1973	3	20	72	Paul Krause	Kansas City Chiefs	T
1975	3	2	54	Mike Franckowiak	Denver Broncos	QB
1975	17	9	425	Tom Ray	Green Bay Packers	DB
1976	13	5	352	James Jones	New England Patriots	DB
1980	5	23	133	Gary Hogeboom	Dallas Cowboys	QB
1981	11	9	285	Robert Jackson	Cincinnati Bengals	DB
1982	9	13	236	Mike Hirn	Pittsburgh Steelers	TE
1985	2	24	52	Jim Bowman	New England Patriots	DB
1985	8	11	207	Curtis Adams	San Diego Chargers	RB
1987	7	9	177	Brian Williams	Philadelphia Eagles	T
1990	12	4	308	Donnie Riley	Phoenix Cardinals	RB
1991	11	11	289	J. J. Wierenga	Green Bay Packers	DE
1997	7	29	230	Scott Rehberg	New England Patriots	T
2005	4	18	119	Eric Ghiaciuc	Cincinnati Bengals	C
2005	5	17	153	Adam Kieft	Cincinnati Bengals	T
2007	1	28	28	Joe Staley	San Francisco 49ers	T
2007	2	30	62	Dan Bazuin	Chicago Bears	DE
2007	6	25	199	Drew Mormino	Miami Dolphins	C
2010	6	12	181	Dan LeFevour	Chicago Bears	QB
2010	6	26	195	Antonio Brown	Pittsburgh Steelers	WR
2013	1	1	1	Eric Fisher	Kansas City Chiefs	T
2015	6	23	199	Leterrius Walton	Pittsburgh Steelers	DT
2016	6	37	212	Kavon Frazier	Dallas Cowboys	DB
2018	5	20	157	Tyler Conklin	Minnesota Vikings	TE
2019	2	7	39	Sean Murphy-Bunting	Tampa Bay Buccaneers	DB
2019	6	22	195	Xavier Crawford	Houston Texans	DB
2022	2	25	57	Luke Goedeke	Tampa Bay Buccaneers	T
2022	3	13	77	Bernhard Raimann	Indianapolis Colts	T
2023	7	18	235	Lew Nichols III	Green Bay Packers	RB
2025	7	13	229	Donte Kent	Pittsburgh Steelers	CB

== Notable undrafted players ==
Note: No drafts held before 1920

Debut year	Player name	Position	Debut NFL/AFL team	Notes
1978	Mose Rison	WR	Houston Oilers	—
1978	Ronald Rummel	QB	Houston Oilers	—
1986	Ray Bentley	LB	Tampa Bay Buccaneers	—
1987	Tony Elliott	S	Green Bay Packers	—
1996	Brock Gutierrez	C	Cincinnati Bengals	—
2001	Brian Leigeb	S	Buffalo Bills	—
2003	Cullen Jenkins	DE	Green Bay Packers	—
2005	Tory Humphrey	TE	Indianapolis Colts	—
2010	Josh Gordy	CB	Jacksonville Jaguars	—
2010	Frank Zombo	LB	Green Bay Packers	—
2011	Vince Agnew	CB	Miami Dolphins	—
2011	Nick Bellore	LB	New York Jets	—
2011	Brett Hartmann	P	Houston Texans	—
2013	Jahleel Addae	S	San Diego Chargers	—
2013	Darren Keyton	G	Detroit Lions	—
2014	Zurlon Tipton	RB	Indianapolis Colts	—
2015	Titus Davis	WR	San Diego Chargers	—
2015	Andy Phillips	C	Green Bay Packers	—
2015	Thomas Rawls	RB	Seattle Seahawks	—
2017	Cooper Rush	QB	Dallas Cowboys	—
2020	Jonathan Ward	RB	Arizona Cardinals	—
2022	Troy Hairston	FB	Houston Texans	—
2022	Dishon McNary	DB	Chicago Bears	—
2022	Kalil Pimpleton	WR	Detroit Lions	—
2023	Thomas Incoom	LB	Denver Broncos	—
2023	Joel Wilson	TE	New Orleans Saints	—
2026	Michael Heldman	DE	New Orleans Saints	—
