= Motor City Bowl =

Defunct college football bowl game held in Detroit

Little Caesars Pizza Bowl (defunct)
- Motor City Bowl
- Stadium: Ford Field
- Location: Detroit, Michigan
- Previous stadiums: Pontiac Silverdome (1997–2001)
- Previous locations: Pontiac, Michigan (1997–2001)
- Operated: 1997–2013
- Conference tie-ins: Big Ten, MAC; Sun Belt (alternate)
- Payout: US$750,000 per team
- Succeeded by: Quick Lane Bowl

Sponsors
- Ford (1997); Ford, Chrysler, GM (1998-2007); Ford, GM, UAW (2008); Little Caesars (2009–2013)

Former names
- Ford Motor City Bowl (1997); Motor City Bowl (1998–2008)

2013 matchup
- Pittsburgh vs. Bowling Green (Pitt 30–27)

The Little Caesars Pizza Bowl (known as the Motor City Bowl until 2009) was a post-season college football bowl game that was played annually from 1997 to 2013. The first five games (1997–2001) were played at the Pontiac Silverdome in Pontiac, Michigan, and moved to the 65,000-seat Ford Field in downtown Detroit, Michigan, in 2002—the past and present homes of the Detroit Lions respectively. The game marked the first bowl game held in the Detroit area since the Cherry Bowl in 1984–85.

The Little Caesars Pizza Bowl featured a bowl-eligible team from the Mid-American Conference (usually the winner of the MAC Championship Game, although that team was not required to accept the bid; prior to the formation of the bowl the MAC champion earned an automatic bid to the Las Vegas Bowl) playing a bowl-eligible team from the Big Ten Conference. If the Big Ten did not have an eligible team, the game featured a team from the Sun Belt Conference that met the NCAA requirement of at least six wins. In the event that the Sun Belt did not have an available team, an at-large team could be chosen.

The final Little Caesars Pizza Bowl was held in 2013; it was displaced by the Quick Lane Bowl, which is organized by the Detroit Lions and also features Big Ten and MAC opponents (though the ACC served as the Big Ten's opponent through 2019). Organizers explored the possibility of moving the Little Caesars Pizza Bowl to nearby Comerica Park as an outdoor game, but the game would instead be cancelled.

== History ==
The Motor City Bowl started in 1997 at the Pontiac Silverdome.

The game was jointly sponsored by the "Big Three" automakers in Detroit from 1998 to 2007 (Ford, General Motors and Chrysler). Starting with the 2008 game, Chrysler was replaced by the Michigan Regional Council of Carpenters and Millwrights as a presenting sponsor. In 2009, Little Caesars became the title sponsor of the game after General Motors and Chrysler reorganized under bankruptcy protection. Ford remained as a sponsor. In 2011, the three automakers, along with the UAW, began contributing $100,000 jointly to become presenting sponsors of the game.

Motor City Bowl logo.

A bowl record crowd of 60,624 fans witnessed the 2007 bowl game between the Purdue Boilermakers and the Central Michigan Chippewas.

On April 12, 2010, it was announced that the Big Ten Conference had extended its affiliation with the Little Caesars Pizza Bowl (Big Ten no. 8) through the 2013 season. Also the Sun Belt Conference agreed to a secondary tie-in that would allow a Sun Belt Conference team to play in the Detroit-based game should the Big Ten Conference not have an available bowl-eligible team to play.

In August 2013, the Detroit Lions announced that it would hold a new bowl game at Ford Field beginning in 2014, between the Big Ten and an Atlantic Coast Conference (ACC) opponent. While Pizza Bowl organizers attempted to move the bowl to Comerica Park (which is owned by Little Caesars' parent company Ilitch Holdings) and convert it to an outdoor game, these plans never came to fruition.

In August 2014, the Lions announced that the new game would be known as the Quick Lane Bowl, and that it would be held on the same day—December 26—that the Little Caesars Pizza Bowl was traditionally held on. In a statement to Crain's Detroit Business, Motor City Bowl executive director Ken Hoffman confirmed that "there is no Pizza Bowl for 2014. We will have to see about the future", implying that the game has been cancelled indefinitely in favor of the Quick Lane Bowl. The MAC holds a secondary tie-in for the Quick Lane Bowl.

== Game results ==
Date	Bowl name	Winning team		Losing team		Attendance	City	Stadium
December 26, 1997	Motor City Bowl	Ole Miss	34	Marshall	31	43,340	Pontiac, Michigan	Pontiac Silverdome
December 23, 1998	Motor City Bowl	Marshall	48	Louisville	29	38,016	Pontiac, Michigan	Pontiac Silverdome
December 27, 1999	Motor City Bowl	#11 Marshall	21	BYU	3	52,449	Pontiac, Michigan	Pontiac Silverdome
December 27, 2000	Motor City Bowl	Marshall	25	Cincinnati	14	52,911	Pontiac, Michigan	Pontiac Silverdome
December 29, 2001	Motor City Bowl	#25 Toledo	23	Cincinnati	16	44,164	Pontiac, Michigan	Pontiac Silverdome
December 26, 2002	Motor City Bowl	Boston College	51	Toledo	25	45,761	Detroit, Michigan	Ford Field
December 26, 2003	Motor City Bowl	Bowling Green	28	Northwestern	24	51,286	Detroit, Michigan	Ford Field
December 27, 2004	Motor City Bowl	Connecticut (Note: Connecticut received the bid to play in the 2004 game as the Big Ten did not field enough teams to qualify for this game.)	39	Toledo	10	52,552	Detroit, Michigan	Ford Field
December 26, 2005	Motor City Bowl	Memphis (Note: Memphis replaced the Big Ten and Big East teams as they did not have enough teams to qualify for the 2005 game.)	38	Akron	31	45,801	Detroit, Michigan	Ford Field
December 26, 2006	Motor City Bowl	Central Michigan	31	Middle Tennessee (Note: The Big Ten did not have enough bowl-eligible teams to fulfill their obligation to qualify for the 2006 game, so Middle Tennessee filled the Big Ten's spot.)	14	54,113	Detroit, Michigan	Ford Field
December 26, 2007	Motor City Bowl	Purdue	51	Central Michigan	48	60,624	Detroit, Michigan	Ford Field
December 26, 2008	Motor City Bowl	Florida Atlantic	24	Central Michigan	21	41,399	Detroit, Michigan	Ford Field
December 26, 2009	Little Caesar's Pizza Bowl	Marshall	21	Ohio	17	30,331	Detroit, Michigan	Ford Field
December 26, 2010	Little Caesar's Pizza Bowl	FIU	34	Toledo	32	32,431	Detroit, Michigan	Ford Field
December 27, 2011	Little Caesar's Pizza Bowl	Purdue	37	Western Michigan	32	46,177	Detroit, Michigan	Ford Field
December 26, 2012	Little Caesar's Pizza Bowl	Central Michigan	24	Western Kentucky	21	23,310	Detroit, Michigan	Ford Field
December 26, 2013	Little Caesar's Pizza Bowl	Pittsburgh	30	Bowling Green	27	26,259	Detroit, Michigan	Ford Field

== MVPs ==
Year	MVP(s)	Team	Position
1997	Stewart Patridge	Mississippi	QB
1998	Chad Pennington	Marshall	QB
1999	Doug Chapman	Marshall	RB
2000	Byron Leftwich	Marshall	QB
2001	Chester Taylor	Toledo	RB
2002	Brian St. Pierre	Boston College	QB
2003	Josh Harris	Bowling Green	QB
2003	Jason Wright	Northwestern	RB
2004	Dan Orlovsky	Connecticut	QB
2005	DeAngelo Williams	Memphis	RB
2006	Dan LeFevour	Central Michigan	QB
2007	Curtis Painter	Purdue	QB
2008	Rusty Smith	Florida Atlantic	QB
2009	Martin Ward	Marshall	RB
2010	T. Y. Hilton	FIU	WR
2011	Akeem Shavers	Purdue	RB
2012	Ryan Radcliff	Central Michigan	QB
2013	James Conner	Pittsburgh	RB

== Appearances by team ==
There were 17 playings of the bowl (34 total appearances).

Teams with multiple appearances

Rank	Team	Appearances	Record
1	Marshall	5	4–1
T2	Central Michigan	4	2–2
T2	Toledo	4	1–3
T4	Purdue	2	2–0
T4	Bowling Green	2	1–1
T4	Cincinnati	2	0–2

Teams with a single appearance

Won: Boston College, Connecticut, Florida Atlantic, FIU, Memphis, Mississippi, Pittsburgh
Loss: Akron, BYU, Louisville, Middle Tennessee, Northwestern, Ohio, Western Kentucky, Western Michigan

== Appearances by conference ==
End zone view during the 2007 edition of the bowl

Rank	Conference	Appearances	Record	Win %	# of Teams	Teams
1	MAC	17	7–10	.412	7	Marshall (3–1) Central Michigan (2–2); Toledo (1–3); Bowling Green (1–1); Akron (0–1); Ohio (0–1); Western Michigan (0–1)
2	C-USA	5	2–3	.400		Cincinnati (0–2) Marshall (1–0); Memphis (1–0); Louisville (0–1)
3	Sun Belt	4	2–2	.500	4	FIU (1–0) Florida Atlantic (1–0); Middle Tennessee (0–1); Western Kentucky (0–1)
4	Big Ten	3	2–1	.667	2	Purdue (2–0) Northwestern (0–1)
5	Big East	2	2–0	1.000	2	Boston College (1–0) Connecticut (1–0)
T6	ACC	1	1–0	1.000	1	Pittsburgh (1–0)
T6	SEC	1	1–0	1.000	1	Ole Miss (1–0)
T6	MWC	1	0–1	.000	1	BYU (0–1)
