= Dan Enos =

American football player and coach (born 1968)

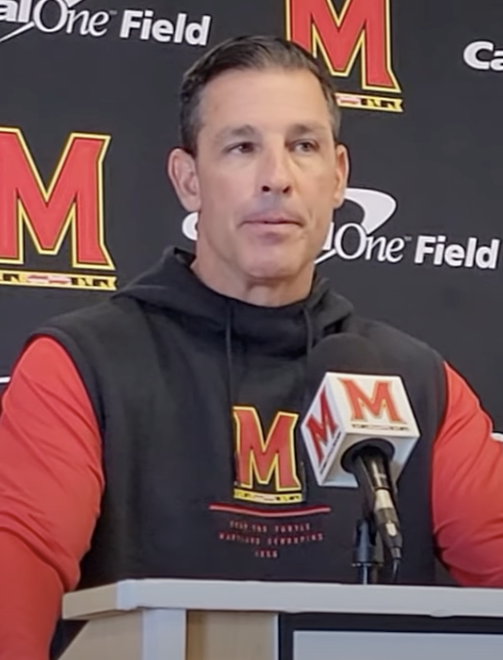
- Enos in 2021

Current position
- Title: Quarterbacks coach
- Team: Wake Forest
- Conference: ACC

Biographical details
- Born: July 1, 1968 (age 57); Dearborn, Michigan, U.S.

Playing career
- 1987–1990: Michigan State
- Position: Quarterback

Coaching career (HC unless noted)
- 1991–1993: Michigan State (GA)
- 1994–1995: Lakeland (OC/QB/WR)
- 1996: Northern Michigan (OC/RB)
- 1997–1998: Southern Illinois (QB/WR)
- 1999: Missouri State (OC/QB)
- 2000–2002: Western Michigan (QB)
- 2003: North Dakota State (OC/QB)
- 2004–2005: Cincinnati (QB)
- 2006: Michigan State (QB)
- 2007–2009: Michigan State (RB)
- 2010–2014: Central Michigan
- 2015–2017: Arkansas (OC/QB)
- 2018: Michigan (OA)
- 2018: Alabama (AHC/QB)
- 2019: Miami (FL) (OC/QB)
- 2020: Cincinnati (AHC/RB)
- 2021–2022: Maryland (OC/QB)
- 2023: Arkansas (OC/QB)
- 2024: Florida (OA)
- 2025–present: Wake Forest (QB)

Head coaching record
- Overall: 26–36
- Bowls: 1–1

Daniel Patrick Enos (born July 1, 1968) is an American football coach and former player who is the quarterbacks coach at Wake Forest University. He was previously the offensive coordinator and quarterbacks coach at the University of Arkansas and the offensive analyst at the University of Florida. He was the offensive coordinator and quarterbacks coach at the University of Miami in 2019. Enos served as head football coach at Central Michigan University from 2010 to 2014. He was also running backs coach at Michigan State University, where he played as a quarterback from 1987 to 1990.

== Playing career ==
Enos attended Edsel Ford High School in Dearborn, Michigan. He played quarterback and earned all-state honors while passing for 46 touchdowns and compiling 5,743 yards of total offense. Enos played four years at Michigan State University (1987–1990), including two as starting quarterback (1989–1990). Under Enos and then coach George Perles Michigan State won the 1989 Aloha Bowl and 1990 John Hancock Bowl and took a share of the 1990 Big Ten championship. As of 2010 Enos has the third-best all-time pass completion percentage in Spartan history (.621) and eighth-best total yards (4,301). In 1991 Enos graduated from Michigan State with a degree in business administration.

== Coaching career ==
=== Michigan State ===
After graduation Enos joined the Michigan State football coaching staff as a graduate assistant, staying there from 1991 to 1993.

=== Lakeland ===
In 1994 Enos joined the coaching staff at Lakeland College, a Division III school in Sheboygan, Wisconsin. As offensive coordinator, Enos helped develop Mark Novara, Lakeland's most successful quarterback. After Novara entered the Lakeland Athletic Hall of Fame in 2008, he credited Enos for much of his success: "That was Coach Enos' first stint on a coaching staff. He was really young, but really good. We knew he'd be in the Big Ten some day."

=== Northern Michigan ===
After two years at Lakeland, Enos moved on to Division II Northern Michigan University, where he spent a year as offensive coordinator.

=== Southern Illinois ===
Enos then spent two years at Southern Illinois as quarterback and wide-receiver coach.

=== Missouri State ===
In 1999, Enos was announced to his first Division I offensive coordinator position at Missouri State in 1999 under then-head coach Randy Ball.

=== Western Michigan ===
Enos then moved to be quarterbacks coach at Western Michigan for three seasons.

=== North Dakota State ===
In 2003, Enos was hired as the offensive coordinator at Division I-FCS North Dakota State University.

=== Cincinnati ===
He then spent two seasons as quarterbacks coach for Cincinnati before returning again to his alma mater of Michigan State, spending four seasons there split between being quarterbacks and running backs coach.

=== Central Michigan ===
On January 12, 2010, Enos was introduced as the head coach at Central Michigan University, replacing Butch Jones, who left after three seasons to replace Brian Kelly at the University of Cincinnati.

Enos's teams struggled in his first two seasons at CMU. Enos produced back-to-back 3–9 seasons in 2010 and 2011. Despite the 6–18 record over two seasons, Enos was rewarded with a one-year contract extension in February 2012, extending his deal through the 2015 season.

Despite a 2–1 start in 2012 and an upset victory on the road over the University of Iowa, CMU again struggled under Enos, suffering a four-game losing streak after the upset in Iowa City. CMU suffered a 42–31 loss to rival Western Michigan University which saw CMU get outscored 28–8 in the 4th quarter. The loss was CMU's second straight to Western and CMU's record stood at 3–6. The following Wednesday the student newspaper, Central Michigan Life, published an editorial calling for Enos to be fired.

After the Western loss, Enos led CMU to a four-game winning streak and a victory over Western Kentucky in the 2012 Little Caesars Pizza Bowl, CMU's first bowl appearance and win since the 2010 GMAC Bowl. The 4-game winning streak gave CMU a record of 7–6, its first winning record since the 2009 season, the last season under Butch Jones and with Dan LeFevour as starting quarterback.

Enos was again rewarded with a one-year contract extension and pay raise in January 2013, extending his deal through the 2016 season.

On January 22, 2015, he resigned to take the offensive coordinator position at Arkansas.

=== Arkansas ===
After resigning his head coaching position at Central Michigan, Enos spent three seasons from 2015 to 2017 as offensive coordinator and quarterbacks coach for Arkansas under then-head coach Bret Bielema. His time as offensive coordinator was highlighted by an 8–5 record and Liberty Bowl win in his first season as offensive coordinator in 2015, the best overall record that Bielema had during his tenure as head coach. Bielema was fired from his position as Arkansas head coach after the 2017 season and new Arkansas head coach Chad Morris chose not to retain Enos, instead opting to bring in his own staff.

His offense in 2015 averaged 6.83 yards per play and had a completion percentage of .658. During the 2015 and 2016 season, Arkansas was one of two teams that featured a 3,000 yard passer and a 1,300 yard rusher. Both of those seasons included a different quarterback and different running back. Enos also coached Hunter Henry in 2015 who won the John Mackey Award as the nation's best tight end. In 2016, Arkansas was tied for second for the most offensive players drafted (5) by the NFL.

=== Michigan ===
Enos joined the Michigan staff as an offensive assistant in January 2018. He only stayed for about 6 weeks before leaving.

=== Alabama ===
Enos then joined Alabama for the 2018 season as quarterbacks coach under head coach Nick Saban as they finished the season with a perfect 13–0 record and a berth in the Orange Bowl as a part of the 2019 College Football Playoff National Championship. Enos was widely credited with Alabama quarterback Tua Tagovailoa's high completion percentage and passer efficiency rating for the 2018 season.

=== Miami ===
After the season Enos left Alabama and was hired as the offensive coordinator and quarterbacks coach at Miami under head coach Manny Diaz. On December 26, 2019, after a 14–0 shutout loss to Louisiana Tech in the Independence Bowl, Miami parted ways with Enos.

=== Maryland ===
On January 11, 2021, Enos was hired as the offensive coordinator and quarterbacks coach at the University of Maryland under head coach Mike Locksley, replacing Scottie Montgomery, who departed to become the running backs coach for the Indianapolis Colts.

Enos’ first season at Maryland brought a record setting passing offense to College Park. Taulia Tagovailoa threw for 3,860 passing yards and tied the school record with 26 passing touchdowns. He finished the season with a 69.2% completion percentage and seven games throwing for more than 300 yards. The 2021 season was the first bowl game for Maryland since 2016. Maryland traveled to New York to play Virginia Tech and it was another record setting performance for the Maryland offense. The offense set a school record for most points in a bowl game (54) which was also the most by a Power 5 team in the 2021 bowl season. In January 2023, Enos resigned to accept the offensive coordinator position at Arkansas.

=== Return to Arkansas ===
On January 19, 2023, Enos was hired by Sam Pittman to replace Kendal Briles as offensive coordinator less than 24 hours after Briles left for TCU. In fact, Enos was announced as Arkansas' new coordinator before TCU could make the same announcement for Briles. Pittman and Enos had previously coached together at Arkansas during the 2015 season under then-head coach Bret Bielema when Enos was in his first year as the Razorbacks OC and Pittman was in his last year as the offensive line coach. On October 22, 2023, the University of Arkansas announced Enos had been relieved of his coaching duties following a 7–3 loss at home to Mississippi State.

=== Florida ===
On February 27, 2024, Enos was hired as an offensive analyst at the University of Florida.

=== Wake Forest ===
On January 16, 2025, Enos was hired as the quarterbacks coach at Wake Forest University.

== Head coaching record ==
Year	Team	Overall	Conference	Standing	Bowl/playoffs
Central Michigan Chippewas (Mid-American Conference) (2010–2014)
2010	Central Michigan	3–9	2–6	T–5th (West)	
2011	Central Michigan	3–9	2–6	6th (West)	
2012	Central Michigan	7–6	4–4	4th (West)	W Little Caesars Pizza
2013	Central Michigan	6–6	5–3	T–3rd (West)	
2014	Central Michigan	7–6	5–3	4th (West)	L Bahamas
Central Michigan:		26–36	18–22		
Total:		26–36			
