= 2012 Mid-American Conference football season =

- League: NCAA Division I FBS (Football Bowl Subdivision)
- Sport: football
- Teams: 13

Regular season
- Season MVP: Jordan Lynch

Football seasons
- 2011 2013

2012 Mid-American Conference football standings
	Conf.			Overall
Team	W		L	W		L
East Division
Kent State x	8	–	0	11	–	3
Bowling Green	6	–	2	8	–	5
Ohio	4	–	4	9	–	4
Buffalo	3	–	5	4	–	8
Miami (OH)	3	–	5	4	–	8
UMass	1	–	7	1	–	11
Akron	0	–	8	1	–	11
West Division
No. 22 Northern Illinois x$	8	–	0	12	–	2
Toledo	6	–	2	9	–	4
Ball State	6	–	2	9	–	4
Central Michigan	4	–	4	7	–	6
Western Michigan	2	–	6	4	–	8
Eastern Michigan	1	–	7	2	–	10
Championship: Northern Illinois 44, Kent State 37
$ – Conference champion and BCS representative as top non-AQ school to meet automatic qualification criteria; x – Division champion/co-champions; UMass not eligible for conference title or bowl game as part of FBS transition; Rankings from AP Poll

The 2012 Mid-American Conference football season is the 67th season for the Mid-American Conference (MAC). The University of Massachusetts joins the conference to create a 13-team, two-division league. Last season at the Marathon MAC Championship game, Northern Illinois defeated Ohio 23–20 for the championship.

== Preseason ==
=== Preseason coaching changes ===
Terry Bowden was hired as Akron 27th head coach before the season started. Chuck Amato was named the associate head coach and defensive coordinator.

=== Transfers ===
Players
Name	Position	Old School	New School
C.J. James	DE	Colorado State	Akron

== Regular season ==
Index to colors and formatting
Mid-American member won
Mid-American member lost
Mid-American teams in **bold**

=== Week One ===
Date	Time	Visiting team	Home team	Site	TV	Result	Attendance	Ref.
August 30	7:00 pm	No. 7 (FCS) Towson	**Kent State**	Dix Stadium • Kent, OH	ESPN3	**W** KSU 41-21	15,121	
August 30	7:00 pm	UCF	**Akron**	InfoCision Stadium • Akron, OH	ESPN3	**L** UCF 56-14	12,616	
August 30	7:00 pm	**Eastern Michigan**	**Ball State**	Scheumann Stadium • Muncie, IN	ESPN3	BSU 37-26	12,725	
August 30	7:00 pm	SE Missouri State	**Central Michigan**	Kelly/Shorts Stadium • Mount Pleasant, MI	ESPN3	**W** CMU 38-27	15,250	
August 30	7:30 pm	**UMass**	Connecticut	Rentschler Field • East Hartford, CT	SNY/ESPN3	**L** UCONN 37-0	35,270	
September 1	12:00 pm	**Ohio**	Penn State	Beaver Stadium • State College, PA	ESPN	**W** Ohio 24-14	97,186	
September 1	12:00 pm	**Buffalo**	No. 6 Georgia	Sanford Stadium • Athens, GA	SECN	**L** UGA 23-45	92,446	
September 1	12:00 pm	**Miami**	Ohio State	Ohio Stadium • Columbus, OH	BTN	**L** OSU 56-10	105,039	
September 1	12:00 pm	**Western Michigan**	Illinois	Memorial Stadium • Champaign, IL	ESPNU	**L** UI 24-7	43,441	
September 1	2:30 pm	**Northern Illinois**	Iowa	Soldier Field • Chicago, IL	ESPNU	**L** IU 18-17	52,117	
September 1	3:30 pm	**Bowling Green**	Florida	Ben Hill Griffin Stadium • Gainesville, FL	ESPN	**L** UF 27-14	84,704	
September 1	10:30 pm	**Toledo**	Arizona	Arizona Stadium • Tucson, AZ	ESPNU	**L** UA 24-17	48,670	
^{#}Rankings from AP Poll released prior to game.

== 2012 MAC Specialty Award Winners ==
Vern Smith Leadership Award Winner: QB Jordan Lynch, Northern Illinois
Coach of the Year: Darrell Hazell, Kent State
Offensive Player of the Year: QB Jordan Lynch, Northern Illinois
Defensive Player of the Year: DT Chris Jones, Bowling Green
Special Teams Player of the Year: KR Dri Archer, Kent State
Freshman of the Year: WR Jaime Wilson, Western Michigan

== All-Conference teams ==
2012 All-MAC First Team Offense
Quarterback – Jordan Lynch, Northern Illinois
Center – Zac Kerin, Toledo
Offensive Linemen – Brian Winters, Kent State
Offensive Lineman – Eric Fisher, Central Michigan
Offensive Lineman – Dann O'Neill, Western Michigan
Offensive Linemen – Austin Holtz, Ball State
Tight End – Zane Fakes, Ball State
Wide Receiver – Martel Moore, Northern Illinois
Wide Receiver – Bernard Reedy, Toledo
Wide Receiver – Willie Snead IV, Ball State
Wide Receiver – Jamill Smith, Ball State
Running Back – Dri Archer, Kent State
Running Back – David Fluellen, Toledo
Placekicker – Steven Schott, Ball State

2012 All-MAC First Team Defense
Outside Linebacker – Khalil Mack, Buffalo
Outside Linebacker –Gabe Martin, Bowling Green
Inside Linebacker – Dan Molls, Toledo
Inside Linebacker – Perry McIntyre, UMass
Down Lineman – Chris Jones, Bowling Green
Down Lineman – Roosevelt Nix, Kent State
Down Lineman – Sean Progar-Jackson, Northern Illinois
Down Lineman – Alan Baxter, Northern Illinois
Defensive Back – Jimmie Ward, Northern Illinois
Defensive Back – Dayonne Nunley, Miami
Defensive Back – BooBoo Gates, Bowling Green
Defensive Back – Jermaine Robinson, Toledo
Punter – Jay Karutz, Eastern Michigan

2012 All-MAC First Team Specialists
Kickoff Return Specialist – Dri Archer, Kent State
Punt Return Specialist –Bernard Reedy, Toledo

2012 All-MAC Second Team Offense
Quarterback – Keith Wenning, Ball State
Center – Skyler Allen, Ohio
Offensive Lineman – Eric Herman, Ohio
Offensive Lineman – Josh Kline, Kent State
Offensive Lineman – Tyler Loos, Northern Illinois
Offensive Lineman – Jordan Roussos, Bowling Green
Tight End – Garrett Hoskins, Eastern Michigan
Wide Receiver – Nick Harwell, Miami
Wide Receiver – Alex Neutz, Buffalo
Wide Receiver – Jaime Wilson, Western Michigan
Wide Receiver – Titus Davis, Central Michigan
Running Back – Beau Blankenship, Ohio
Running Back – Zurlon Tipton, Central Michigan
Placekicker – Matt Weller, Ohio

2012 All-MAC Second Team Defense
Outside Linebacker – Tyrone Clark, Northern Illinois
Outside Linebacker – Justin Cudworth, Eastern Michigan
Inside Linebacker – Travis Freeman, Ball State
Inside Linebacker – Luke Batton, Kent State
Down Lineman – Jonathan Newsome, Ball State
Down Lineman – Freddie Bishop, Western Michigan
Down Lineman – Steven Means, Buffalo
Down Lineman – Andy Mulumba, Eastern Michigan
Defensive Back – Jahleel Addae, Central Michigan
Defensive Back – Luke Wollet, Kent State
Defensive Back – Darren Thellen, UMass
Defensive Back – Justin Currie, Western Michigan
Punter – Brian Schmiedebusch, Bowling Green

2012 All-MAC Second Team Specialists
Kickoff Return Specialist – Bernard Reedy, Toledo
Punt Return Specialist – Jaime Wilson, Western Michigan

2012 All-MAC Third Team Offense
Quarterback – Zac Dysert, Miami
Center – Kevin Galeher, Western Michigan
Offensive Lineman – Greg Mancz, Toledo
Offensive Lineman – Dominic Flewellyn, Bowling Green
Offensive Lineman – Jordan Hansel, Ball State
Offensive Lineman – Cam Lowry, Ball State
Tight End – Alex Bayer, Bowling Green
Wide Receiver – Marquelo Suel, Akron
Wide Receiver – Andy Cruse, Miami
Wide Receiver – Cody Wilson, Central Michigan
Wide Receiver – Alonzo Russell, Toledo
Running Back – Jahwan Edwards, Ball State
Running Back – Trayion Durham, Kent State
Placekicker – Jeremiah Detmer, Toledo

2012 All-MAC Third Team Defense
Outside Linebacker – C.J. Malauulu, Kent State
Outside Linebacker – Alphonso Lewis, Ohio
Inside Linebacker – Dwayne Woods, Bowling Green
Inside Linebacker – Desmond Bozeman, Western Michigan
Down Lineman – Nate Ollie, Ball State
Down Lineman – Jake Dooley, Kent State
Down Lineman – Neal Huynh, Ohio
Down Lineman – Ted Ouellet, Bowling Green
Defensive Back – Cam Truss, Bowling Green
Defensive Back – Eric Patterson, Ball State
Defensive Back – Cheatham Norrils, Toledo
Defensive Back – Johnnie Simon, Western Michigan
Punter – Colter Johnson, UMass

2012 All-MAC Third Team Specialists
Kickoff Return Specialist – Jamill Smith, Ball State
Punt Return Specialist – Jamill Smith, Ball State

== Bowl games ==
The MAC placed seven teams in bowl games in 2012. This was the highest number of MAC bowl teams in the conference's history. For the first time, the MAC placed a team in a BCS Bowl with Northern Illinois playing in the Orange Bowl.

NOTE: All times are local

Bowl	Date	Time	SBC team (Record)	Opponent (Record)	Site	TV	Result	Attendance
2012 Famous Idaho Potato Bowl	December 15	4:30 pm	Toledo (9–3)	Utah State (10–2)	Bronco Stadium • Boise, ID	ESPN	L 15–41	29,243
2012 Beef 'O' Brady's Bowl	December 21	7:30 pm	Ball State (9–3)	Central Florida (10–3)	Tropicana Field • St. Petersburg, FL	ESPN	L 17–38	21,759
2012 Little Caesars Pizza Bowl	December 26	6:30 pm	Western Kentucky (7–5)	Central Michigan (6–6)	Ford Field • Detroit, MI	ESPN	W 24–21	23,3104
2012 Military Bowl	December 27	3:00 pm	Bowling Green (8–4)	No. 24 San Jose State (10–2)	RFK Stadium • Washington, D.C.	ESPN	L 20–29	17,835
2012 Advocare V100 Independence Bowl	December 28	1:00 pm	Louisiana-Monroe (8–4)	Ohio (8–4)	Independence Stadium • Shreveport, LA	ESPN	W 45–14	41,853
2013 Discover Orange Bowl	January 1	8:20 pm	No. 15 Northern Illinois (12–1)	No. 12 Florida St. (11–2)	Sun Life Stadium • Miami Gardens, FL	ESPN	L 10–31	72,073
2013 GoDaddy.com Bowl	January 6	8:00 pm	Arkansas St. (9–3)	No. 25 Kent State (11–2)	Ladd–Peebles Stadium • Mobile, AL	ESPN	L 13–17	37,913

== Notable players ==
Players	Class	Position	School
Isaiah Williams	So	DL	Akron
Justin March	So	LB	Akron
