= 2014 Bahamas Bowl =

2014 Popeyes Bahamas Bowl
- 1st Bahamas Bowl
Central Michigan Chippewas	WKU Hilltoppers
(7–5)	(7–5)
MAC	C-USA
48	49
Head coach: Dan Enos	Head coach: Jeff Brohm
	1	2	3	4	Total
Central Michigan	7	7	0	34	48
WKU	21	21	7	0	49
- Date: December 24, 2014
- Season: 2014
- Stadium: Thomas Robinson Stadium
- Location: Nassau, Bahamas
- MVP: Offensive: WKU QB Brandon Doughty; Defensive: WKU DL Derik Overstreet
- Favorite: W. Kentucky by 3.5
- Referee: John McDaid (American)
- Attendance: 13,667
- Payout: US$TBD

United States TV coverage
- Network: ESPN/ESPN Radio
- Announcers: Steve Levy, Lou Holtz, Mark May, & Laura Rutledge (ESPN); John Brickley & Pete Najarian (ESPN Radio)

The 2014 Bahamas Bowl was a post-season American college football bowl game that was played December 24, 2014 at Thomas Robinson Stadium in Nassau in the Bahamas. The first edition of the Bahamas Bowl featured the Central Michigan Chippewas of the Mid-American Conference against the Western Kentucky Hilltoppers of Conference USA. It began at 12:00 p.m. EST and aired on ESPN. It was one of the 2014–15 bowl games that concluded the 2014 FBS football season. Sponsored by the Popeyes Louisiana Kitchen fried chicken restaurant chain, the game was officially known as the Popeyes Bahamas Bowl.

Western Kentucky beat Central Michigan, 49–48.

By the middle of the third quarter, the Chippewas had fallen behind the Hilltoppers by a score of 49–14, but they scored four unanswered touchdowns and so near the end of the fourth quarter were down by only seven points.

With one second remaining on the clock, Central Michigan had the ball on their own 25 yard line. The would-be final play started with a 45-yard Hail Mary pass from QB Cooper Rush to receiver Jesse Kroll. As Kroll was being tackled he lateraled the ball to teammate Deon Butler, who darted 20 yards before lateraling to Courtney Williams. With no room to run, Williams executed a quick third lateral pass to star receiver Titus Davis who ran the final 13 yards and dove towards the pylon, scoring a touchdown that would have tied the game with a kicked extra point and sent the game into overtime, but instead Central Michigan attempted a two-point conversion for the win, which was unsuccessful. Had the try succeeded, it would have marked the largest comeback in bowl history and tied the largest comeback in any FBS game. The play was nominated for an ESPY Award.

Chippewas quarterback Cooper Rush threw seven touchdown passes, setting a new NCAA bowl game record.

This was the first postseason bowl game to be played outside the United States since the 2010 International Bowl at the Rogers Centre in Toronto, Canada.

== Teams ==
The game featured the Central Michigan Chippewas of the Mid-American Conference against the Western Kentucky Hilltoppers of Conference USA.

This was a rematch of both teams' most recent bowl appearance. The 2012 Little Caesars Pizza Bowl saw Central Michigan defeat Western Kentucky by a score of 24–21.

=== Central Michigan Chippewas ===
After finishing the regular season with a 7–5 record, the Chippewas accepted their bid to the Bahamas Bowl.

=== Western Kentucky Hilltoppers ===
After finishing the regular season with a 7–5 record, the Hilltoppers accepted their bid to the Bahamas Bowl.

== Weather and attendance ==
The game was played in brilliant sunshine, temperature of 79 degrees and a light, but steady, breeze from the SSE of 8 mph. The announced attendance was 13,667, but USA Today reported that attendance at the 15,000-seat Thomas Robinson Stadium in downtown Nassau was considerably sparser. The lower sections of the stadium, in direct sunlight, were nearly deserted as the few hundreds of spectators clustered in the upper rows, in the shade. The small stands behind both end zones were closed off.

== Game summary ==
This game saw WKU get off to a fast start, leading 42-14 at halftime. After building a 49-14 lead, CMU mounted a historic comeback scoring 34 unanswered points in the 4th quarter. CMU forced a 3 and out on WKU in the 4th quarter, which resulted in a punt that landed in the end zone.

=== Final play of the game ===
CMU found themselves down 49–42 with one second left on the clock at their own 25 yard line after a punt by the Hilltoppers. Cooper Rush threw a pass down field 48 yards, which was caught by Jesse Kroll. Kroll then lateraled the ball to Deon Butler for 10 yards, who was chased down from behind but managed to lateral it back to Courtney Williams. Williams ran forward 2 yards and threw the ball laterally to Titus Davis. Davis then ran to the sideline being chased by 4 WKU defenders and managed to dive into the corner of the end zone, hitting the pylon with the football. The play resulted in a touchdown for the Chippewas that pulled them within 1 point. However, their ensuing 2 point conversion failed as Rush's pass to the back of the end zone fell incomplete, resulting in a 49–48 WKU win.

=== Scoring summary ===
Scoring summary

Quarter	Time	Drive			Team	Scoring information	Score	
Quarter	Time	Plays	Yards	TOP	Team	Scoring information	CMU	WKU
1	11:23	11	75	3:37	WKU	Jared Dangerfield 14-yard touchdown reception from Brandon Doughty, Garrett Schwettman kick good	0	7
1	10:00	3	75	1:23	CMU	Titus Davis 21-yard touchdown reception from Cooper Rush, Brian Eavey kick good	7	7
1	8:07	6	75	1:53	WKU	Joel German 12-yard touchdown reception from Brandon Doughty, Garrett Schwettman kick good	7	14
1	1:13	9	84	3:28	WKU	Antwane Grant 19-yard touchdown reception from Brandon Doughty, Garrett Schwettman kick good	7	21
2	10:03	10	81	3:23	WKU	Mitchell Henry 16-yard touchdown reception from Brandon Doughty, Garrett Schwettman kick good	7	28
2	2:55	12	79	7:08	CMU	Courtney Williams 30-yard touchdown reception from Cooper Rush, Brian Eavey kick good	14	28
2	1:41	3	69	1:14	WKU	Willie McNeal 55-yard touchdown reception from Brandon Doughty, Garrett Schwettman kick good	14	35
2	0:04	6	62	0:44	WKU	Leon Allen 1-yard touchdown run, Garrett Schwettman kick good	14	42
3	8:55	1	21	0:07	WKU	Anthony Wales 21-yard touchdown run, Garrett Schwettman kick good	14	49
4	11:37	10	80	4:42	CMU	Titus Davis 12-yard touchdown reception from Cooper Rush, Brian Eavey kick good	21	49
4	8:03	5	50	2:04	CMU	Titus Davis 23-yard touchdown reception from Cooper Rush, Brian Eavey kick good	28	49
4	3:06	7	64	3:10	CMU	Courtney Williams 10-yard touchdown reception from Cooper Rush, Brian Eavey kick good	35	49
4	1:09	4	55	0:51	CMU	Anthony Garland 7-yard touchdown reception from Cooper Rush, Brian Eavey kick good	42	49
4	0:00	1	75	0:01	CMU	Cooper Rush pass complete to Jesse Kroll for 48 yards, lateral to Deon Butler for 2 yards, lateral to Courtney Williams for 8 yards, lateral to Titus Davis for 17 yards for a touchdown, 2-point pass no good	48	49
"TOP" = time of possession. For other American football terms, see Glossary of American football.							48	49

=== Statistics ===
Statistics	CMU	WKU
First downs	28	30
Plays–yards	74–607	74–647
Rushes–yards	29–114	32–161
Passing yards	493	486
Passing: Comp–Att–Int	28–45–1	31–42–0
Time of possession	32:51	27:09

== See also ==
- 2006 Michigan State vs. Northwestern football game, the only time in FBS history that a team successfully rallied from a 35-point deficit
- 2006 Insight Bowl and 2016 Alamo Bowl (January), which share the record for the largest bowl comeback
