= Eric Fisher (American football) =

American football player (born 1991)

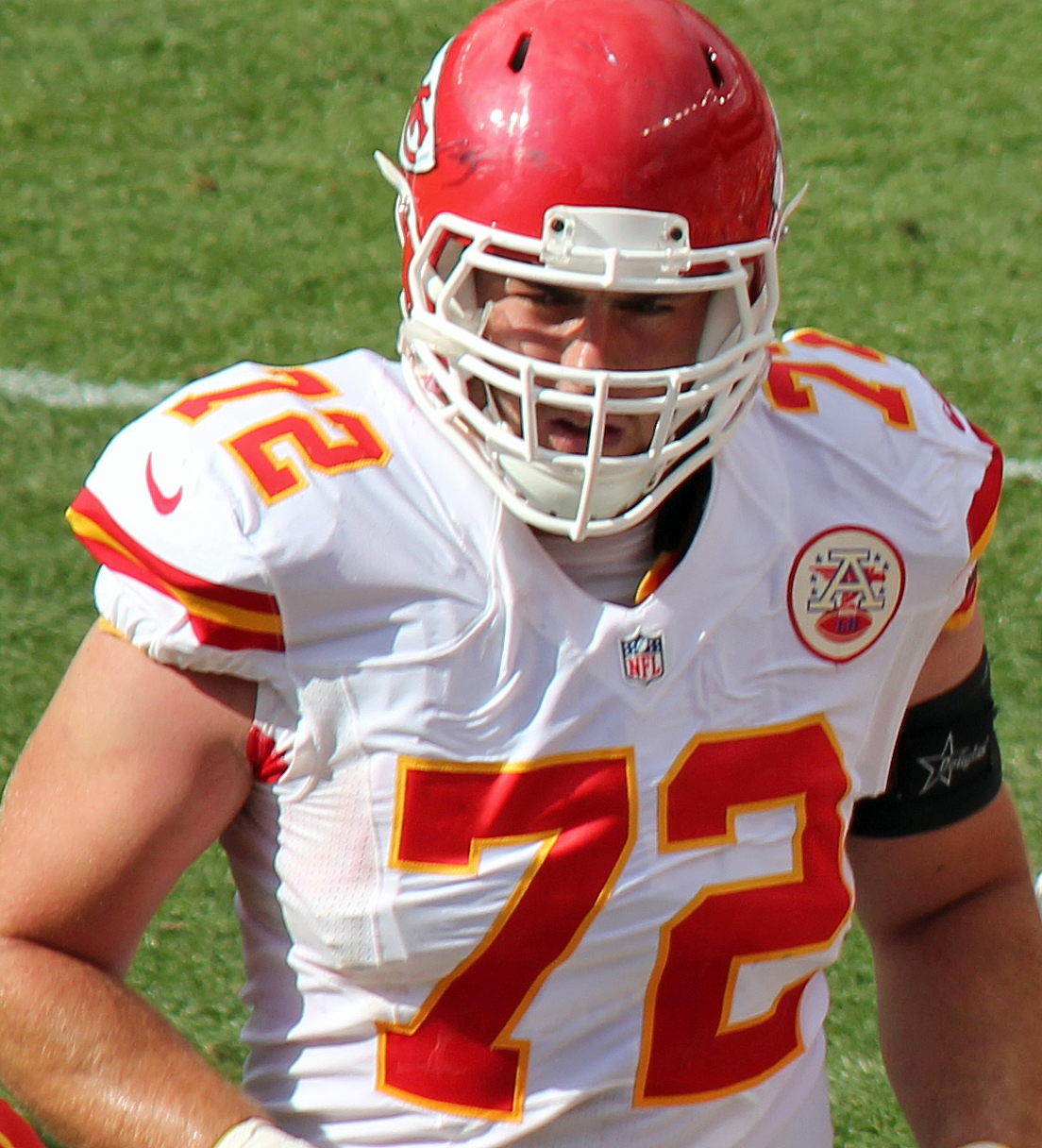
- Fisher with the Kansas City Chiefs in 2014

No. 72, 79
- Position: Offensive tackle

Personal information
- Born: January 5, 1991 (age 35); Rochester, Michigan, U.S.
- Listed height: 6 ft 7 in (2.01 m)
- Listed weight: 312 lb (142 kg)

Career information
- High school: Stoney Creek (Rochester Hills, Michigan)
- College: Central Michigan (2009–2012)
- NFL draft: 2013: 1st round, 1st overall pick

Career history
- Kansas City Chiefs (2013–2020); Indianapolis Colts (2021); Miami Dolphins (2022)

Awards and highlights
- Super Bowl champion (LIV); 2× Pro Bowl (2018, 2020); First-team All-American (2012); First-team All-MAC (2012); Third-team All-MAC (2011)

Career NFL statistics
- Games played: 132
- Games started: 128
- Fumble recoveries: 3
- Stats at Pro Football Reference

Eric William Fisher (born January 5, 1991) is an American former professional football offensive tackle who played in the National Football League (NFL) for 10 seasons, primarily with the Kansas City Chiefs. He played college football for the Central Michigan Chippewas, earning first-team All-American honors in 2012. Fisher was selected first overall by the Chiefs in the 2013 NFL draft.

During his eight seasons with the Chiefs, Fisher received two Pro Bowl selections and was a member of the team that won Super Bowl LIV, the franchise's first Super Bowl title in 50 years. He spent his final two seasons with the Indianapolis Colts and Miami Dolphins for one year each.

== Early life ==
Fisher and his sister were raised in Rochester, Michigan, by his mother. During that time, she also overcame thyroid cancer while raising them on her own. He attended Stoney Creek High School, where he was an All-State honorable mention lineman for the football team. Regarded as a two-star recruit by Rivals.com, he was not ranked among the best offensive tackle prospects in his class. According to Fisher, this was due to him being undersized for an offensive tackle, weighing only 225 pounds as a high school senior.

== College career ==
Fisher played at Central Michigan University from 2009 to 2012 where he was recognized as a first-team All-American by Pro Football Weekly, a second-team selection by Sports Illustrated, and received third-team honors from the Associated Press. He was also a first-team All-Mid-American Conference (MAC) selection. Fisher was a part of two bowl wins while at Central Michigan; the 2010 GMAC Bowl and the 2012 Little Caesars Pizza Bowl.

== Professional career ==
Pre-draft measurables
Height	Weight	Arm length	Hand span	Wingspan	40-yard dash	10-yard split	20-yard split	20-yard shuttle	Three-cone drill	Vertical jump	Broad jump	Bench press
6 ft 7 1/4 in (2.01 m)	306 lb (139 kg)	34 1/2 in (0.88 m)	10 1/2 in (0.27 m)	6 ft 10 in (2.08 m)	5.05 s	1.72 s	2.90 s	4.44 s	7.59 s	28.5 in (0.72 m)	9 ft 8 in (2.95 m)	27 reps
All values from NFL Combine

=== Kansas City Chiefs ===
Fisher was considered one of the top offensive tackles (and overall players) available in the 2013 NFL draft. He was selected by the Kansas City Chiefs with the first overall pick, becoming the first MAC player to be drafted No. 1 overall. Fisher is one of two Central Michigan players to be selected in the first round of an NFL Draft; the other is Joe Staley.

On July 26, 2013, Fisher signed a guaranteed contract with the Chiefs worth $22.1 million with a $14.5 million signing bonus. Despite playing left tackle during college, Fisher transitioned to right tackle for the 2013 season. He allowed 7 sacks and 35 hurries. According to Pro Football Focus, his run-blocking grade of −6.5 ranked 55th out of 76 NFL tackles who played at least 25 percent of their team's snaps. His overall grade as a tackle ranked 70th. Despite Fisher's struggles during his rookie season, Chiefs general manager John Dorsey noted Fisher's potential and expressed confidence that he would develop into a good player. Fisher played in 14 games, of which he started 13, during his rookie year of 2013.

In March 2014, head coach Andy Reid announced that he was moving Fisher to the left tackle position for the upcoming 2014 season, following the loss of Branden Albert in free agency. During the 2015 season, Fisher played in 16 games, starting in 14.

On May 2, 2016, the Chiefs picked up the fifth-year option Fisher's contract. On July 30, 2016, Fisher signed a four-year contract extension with the Chiefs worth $48 million, including $40 million guaranteed. In Week 1, after a strong performance, Pro Football Focus ranked Fisher as the number one left tackle of the week. In the divisional round of the 2016 playoffs against the Pittsburgh Steelers, the Chiefs were down 18–10 in the 4th quarter. Following a successful two-point conversion, Fisher was called on a holding penalty that resulted in a loss of 10 yards. On the second attempt from the Steelers' 12-yard line, the Chiefs failed the two-point conversion, resulting in their elimination from the playoffs as they lost to the Steelers by a score of 18–16.

In 2019, Fisher was limited to eight games due to injuries. Fisher and the Chiefs went on to win Super Bowl LIV, their first championship in 50 years. He joined Clark Hunt and Andy Reid in accepting the Vince Lombardi Trophy on behalf of the team.

Following the release of long-time Chiefs punter Dustin Colquitt in the 2020 offseason, Fisher became tied with Anthony Sherman and fellow 2013 draftee Travis Kelce as the longest tenured members of the Chiefs. In the Week 3 game of the Chiefs' 2020 season against the Baltimore Ravens, Fisher lined up as an eligible receiver and caught a two-yard pass for a touchdown, the first of his career. The touchdown was the first receiving touchdown scored by a number one overall selection since Keyshawn Johnson in 2006. Fisher was placed on the reserve/COVID-19 list by the Chiefs on November 16, 2020, and activated three days later.

On January 24, 2021, against the Buffalo Bills in the AFC Championship Game, Fisher suffered a torn Achilles, forcing him to miss Super Bowl LV. He was placed on injured reserve on February 6. The Chiefs would go on to lose 31–9 to the Tampa Bay Buccaneers.

Fisher was released after eight seasons on March 11, 2021.

=== Indianapolis Colts ===
On May 12, 2021, Fisher signed a one-year, $8.38 million deal with the Indianapolis Colts.

=== Miami Dolphins ===
On December 5, 2022, the Miami Dolphins signed Fisher to their active roster. On January 6, 2023, Fisher was placed on injured reserve despite being inactive for every game.
