= Scott Rehberg =

American football player (born 1973)

No. 60, 79
- Position: Guard

Personal information
- Born: November 17, 1973 (age 52); Kalamazoo, Michigan, U.S.
- Listed height: 6 ft 8 in (2.03 m)
- Listed weight: 325 lb (147 kg)

Career information
- High school: Kalamazoo Central
- College: Central Michigan
- NFL draft: 1997: 7th round, 230th overall pick
- Expansion draft: 1999: 1st round, 3rd overall pick

Career history
- New England Patriots (1997–1998); Cleveland Browns (1999); Cincinnati Bengals (2000–2003); San Francisco 49ers (2004)*
- * Offseason or practice squad member only

Awards and highlights
- First-team All-MAC (1996)

Career NFL statistics
- Games played: 79
- Games started: 27
- Fumble recoveries: 1
- Stats at Pro Football Reference

Scott Joseph Rehberg (born November 17, 1973) is an American former professional football player who was a guard for seven seasons in the National Football League (NFL) for the New England Patriots, Cleveland Browns, and Cincinnati Bengals. He played college football for the Central Michigan Chippewas.

He was inducted into Central Michigan University's athletic Hall of Fame in 2014. He was a four-year letterwinner and three-year starter at left tackle. He earned first-team All-Mid-American Conference honors in 1996 and second-team in 1995. He helped CMU to the MAC championship in 1994, helping pave the way for three consecutive 1,000-yard rushers in Brian Pruitt (1994) and Silas Massey (1995 and 1996). Pruitt's 1,890-yard season in 1994 and Massey's 1,544-yard effort in 1996 remain the top two single-season rushing totals in CMU history. Rehberg was a key cog up front on the 1996 team that led the MAC in total offense and scoring, ranking as NCAA's 7th-best offense. He was named to the academic All-MAC team in 1995 and 1996, and was selected to play in the Hula Bowl, a college football all-star game, in 1997. Rehberg was selected by New England Patriots in 7th round of the 1997 NFL draft He played 79 NFL games, starting 27 over seven-year career.
