= Jermaine Robinson =

American gridiron football player

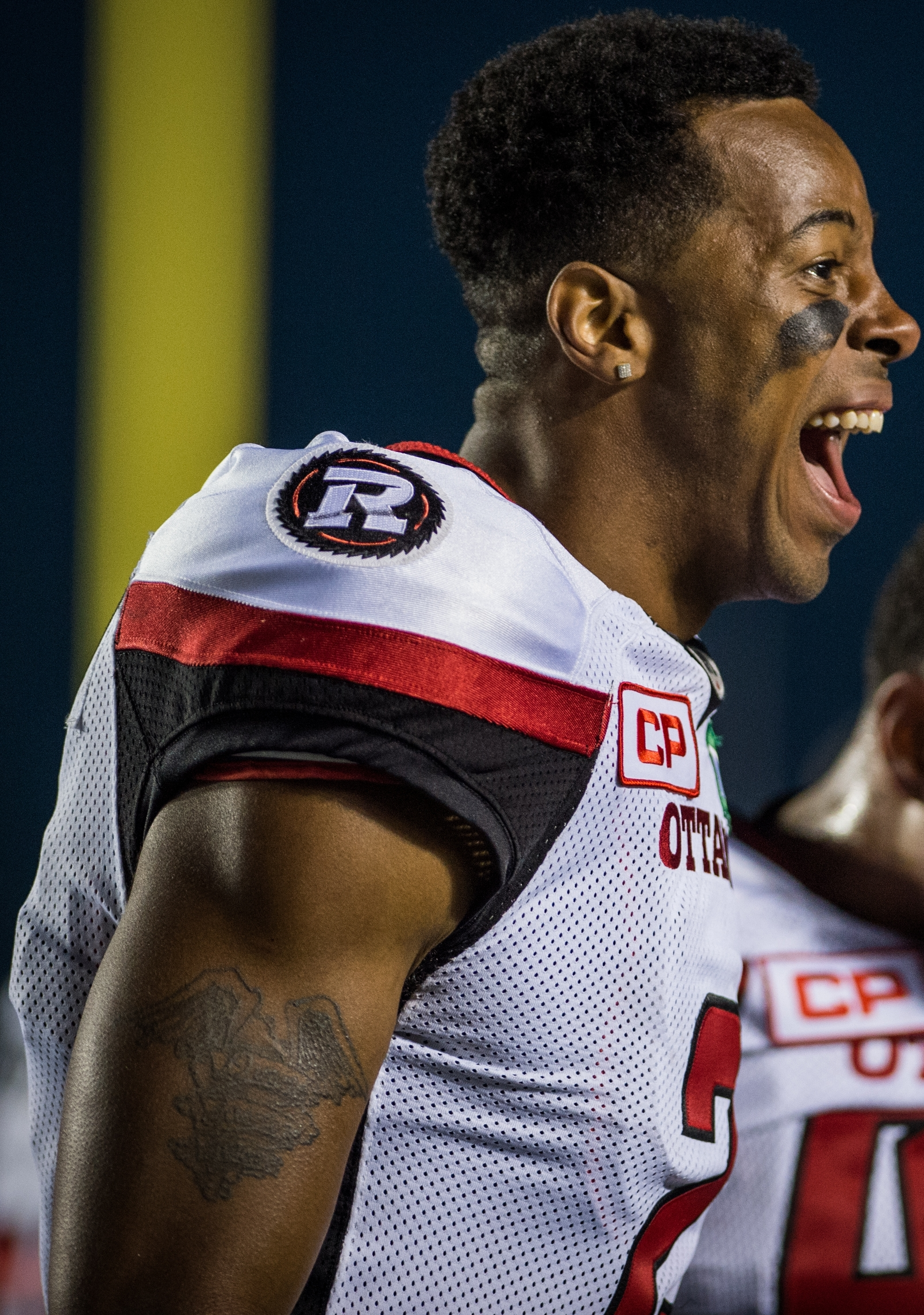
- Robinson in 2016

No. 32, 2, 29, 18
- Position: Defensive back

Personal information
- Born: April 10, 1989 (age 37); Pittsburgh, Pennsylvania
- Listed height: 6 ft 3 in (1.91 m)
- Listed weight: 205 lb (93 kg)

Career information
- High school: Pittsburgh (PA) Brashear
- College: Toledo
- NFL draft: 2013: undrafted

Career history
- Sioux Falls Storm (2013); Ottawa Redblacks (2014–2016); Hamilton Tiger-Cats (2016); Sioux Falls Storm (2017); Montreal Alouettes (2018)

Awards and highlights
- First-team All-MAC (2012); United Bowl champion (2013)

Career CFL statistics as of 2016
- Tackles: 25
- Quarterback sacks: 0
- Interceptions: 1
- Stats at CFL.ca

Jermaine Robinson (born April 10, 1989) is an American former professional gridiron football defensive back. He played college football at Toledo.

== College career ==
Robinson played for Toledo from 2009 to 2012.

== Professional career ==
Robinson played in four games for the Sioux Falls Storm in 2013. Robinson signed with the Ottawa Redblacks in March 2014. Robinson signed with the Hamilton Tiger-Cats on September 20, 2016. On May 31, 2017, Robinson signed with the Sioux Falls Storm. He participated in The Spring League in 2017.
