= Ryan Radcliff =

American football player (born 1990)

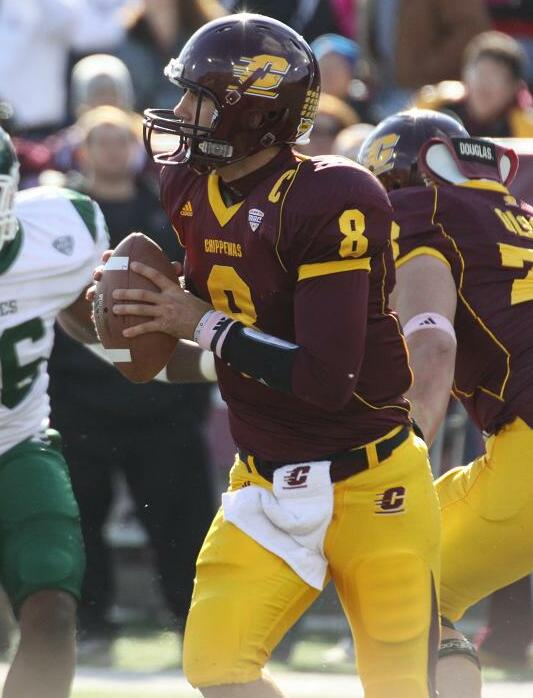
- Radcliff in 2011

No. 8
- Position: Quarterback

Personal information
- Born: February 14, 1990 (age 36); Sherwood, Ohio, U.S.
- Listed height: 6 ft 3 in (1.91 m)
- Listed weight: 215 lb (98 kg)

Career information
- High school: Fairview High School, Sherwood, Ohio
- College: Central Michigan (2009–2012)
- Stats at ESPN

Ryan Radcliff (born February 14, 1990) is an American former football quarterback. He was the starting quarterback for the Central Michigan Chippewas from 2010 to 2012.

== Early life ==
Racliff played high school football for Fairview High School in Sherwood, Ohio. He was the starting quarterback at Fairview three straight years and was a first-team All-Ohio selection in 2006 and 2007. He completed 784 of 1,294 passes at Fairview for 11,038 yards and 139 touchdowns. As a senior, he compiled 5,356 yards of total offense, including 4,738 passing yards and 618 rushing yards. He set an Ohio high school record in 2006 by throwing for 678 passing yards in a single game. He was also drafted by the Colorado Rockies in the 2008 Major League Baseball draft.

== College career ==
After redshirting in 2008, Radcliff was Central Michigan's backup quarterback in 2009.

In 2010, Radcliff became the starting quarterback. He was the starter in all 12 games for Central Michigan. He completed 282 of 466 passes in 2010 for 3,358 yards and 17 touchdowns. He ranked 15th among all Division I FBS players in passing yardage, and 12th in passing yards per game (279.8).

As a redshirt junior in 2011, Radcliff returned as Central Michigan's starting quarterback. On October 22, 2011, he threw for a collegiate career high 436 yards against Ball State. During the 2011 regular season, Radcliff has completed 257 of 453 passes for 3,286 yards and 25 touchdowns. He ranked 15th among all NCAA Division I FBS players in passing yardage.

In 2012, Radcliff showed great improvement in his senior season. After a rough start to the season throwing only 1 touchdown to 3 interceptions in his first two games against Southeast Missouri State and Michigan State, Radcliff threw 19 touchdowns to only 6 interceptions over the next 10 games. Radcliff had a huge game against the Iowa Hawkeyes giving the Chippewas their 3rd win against a Big Ten team in their last six tries. He finished the season with 23 touchdowns and 9 interceptions with 3,158 yards as the Chippewas defeated Western Kentucky in the 2012 Little Caesars Pizza Bowl. Radcliff is one of only three CMU quarterbacks to win a bowl game, the others being Dan LeFevour and Daniel Richardson.

=== Statistics ===
Year	Games	Completions	Attempts	Comp %	Yards	TDs	Interception	QB rating
2009	5	10	21	47.6	115	0	2	74.6
2010	12	282	466	60.5	3,358	17	17	125.8
2011	12	257	453	56.7	3,286	25	16	128.8
2012	13	242	407	59.5	3,158	23	9	138.9
Career	42	791	1,347	58.7	9,917	65	44	130
