= Cooper Rush =

American football player

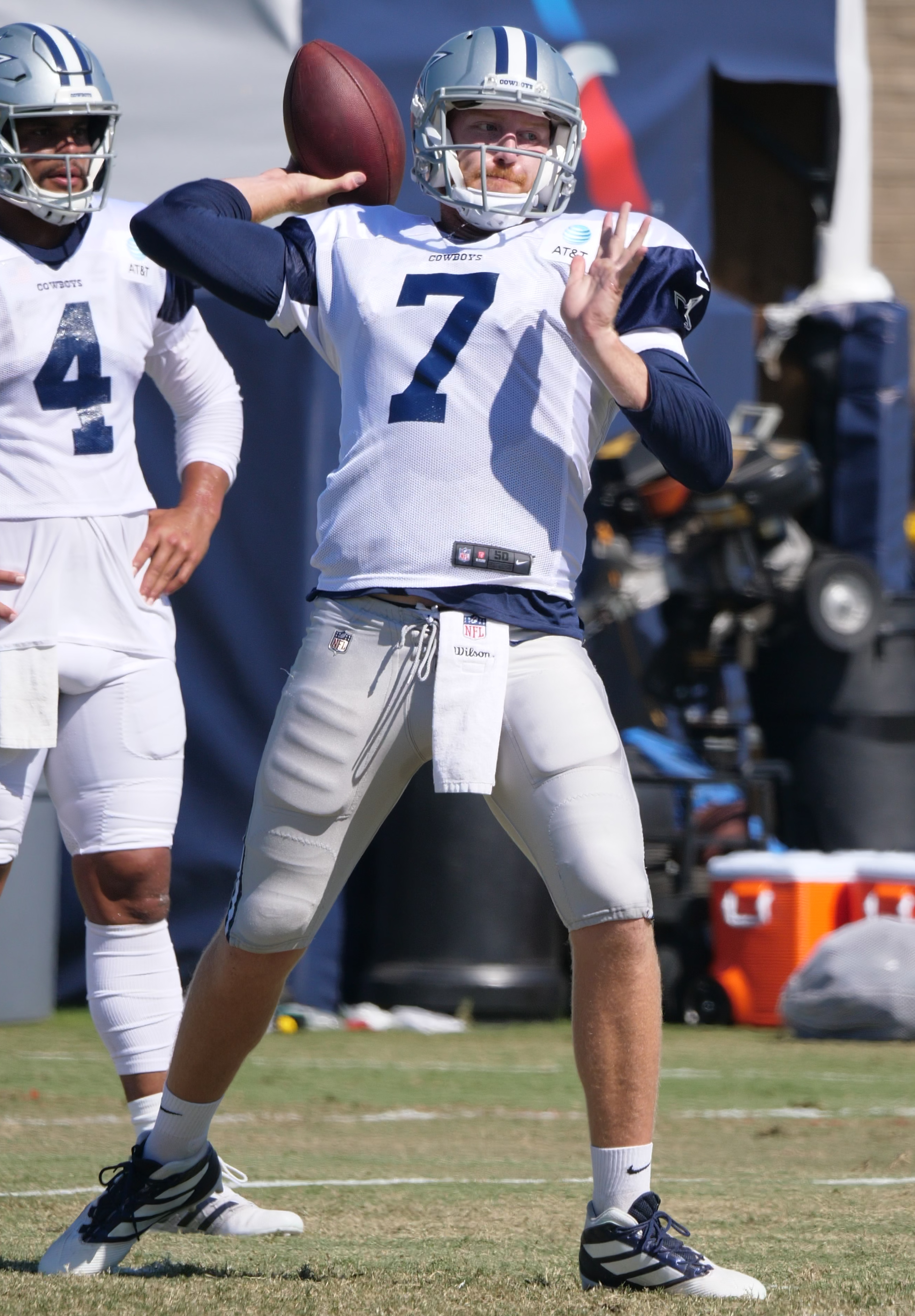
- Rush with the Dallas Cowboys in 2019

No. 8 – Tampa Bay Buccaneers
- Position: Quarterback
- Roster status: Practice squad

Personal information
- Born: November 21, 1993 (age 32); Charlotte, Michigan, U.S.
- Listed height: 6 ft 3 in (1.91 m)
- Listed weight: 225 lb (102 kg)

Career information
- High school: Lansing Catholic (Lansing, Michigan)
- College: Central Michigan (2012–2016)
- NFL draft: 2017: undrafted

Career history
- Dallas Cowboys (2017–2019); New York Giants (2020)*; Dallas Cowboys (2020–2024); Baltimore Ravens (2025); Atlanta Falcons (2026); Tampa Bay Buccaneers (2026–present)*
- * Offseason or practice squad member only

Awards and highlights
- Second-team All-MAC (2015); Third-team All-MAC (2016)

Career NFL statistics as of Week 2, 2026
- Passing attempts: 635
- Passing completions: 386
- Completion percentage: 60.8%
- TD–INT: 21–18
- Passing yards: 3,995
- Passer rating: 78.2
- Stats at Pro Football Reference

Cooper Robert Rush (born November 21, 1993) is an American professional football quarterback for the Tampa Bay Buccaneers of the National Football League (NFL). He played college football for the Central Michigan Chippewas, and was signed by the Dallas Cowboys as an undrafted free agent in 2017.

== Early life ==
Originally from Charlotte, Michigan, Rush attended Lansing Catholic High School in Lansing, Michigan, with an enrollment of just over 500 students, where he became a three-year starter at quarterback for the football team. Rush also played basketball and baseball (until his freshman year).

In 2010 and 2011, Rush led his team to back-to-back undefeated regular seasons. In 2011, Rush led his team to the state runner-up title. In the Division 5 regional championship game against Dowagiac Union High School, he set Michigan state records with five touchdown passes in one quarter and eight for the game. The team would end up losing in the finals against Powers Catholic High School 56–26, even though Rush registered 300 passing yards and three touchdowns.

As a senior, Rush received All-State, Associated Press' Michigan Division 5/6 Player of the Year and ESPN's Michigan Gatorade Player of the Year honors.

Rush finished his high school career throwing for 7,248 passing yards (455-for-734, 62 percent) and 80 touchdowns to go along with 1,438 rushing yards and 27 touchdowns. A three-star recruit, Rush only received scholarship offers from Central Michigan and Toledo, but received preferred walk-on offers from Michigan, Michigan State, Northwestern, and Western Michigan.

== College career ==
In his redshirt season at Central Michigan, Rush was named the school's Scout Team Player of the Year.

As a freshman, although he began the season as the third-string quarterback, Rush was named the starter by the third game, after Cody Kater was injured (collarbone fracture) and his backup Alex Niznak could not move the offense against the New Hampshire Wildcats. In that contest, Rush came in in the second quarter and helped engineer a 24–21 comeback victory, where he tallied 326 passing yards and three touchdowns, tying the school record for the longest in history (97 yards). Rush would never relinquish the position or miss a start after the game.

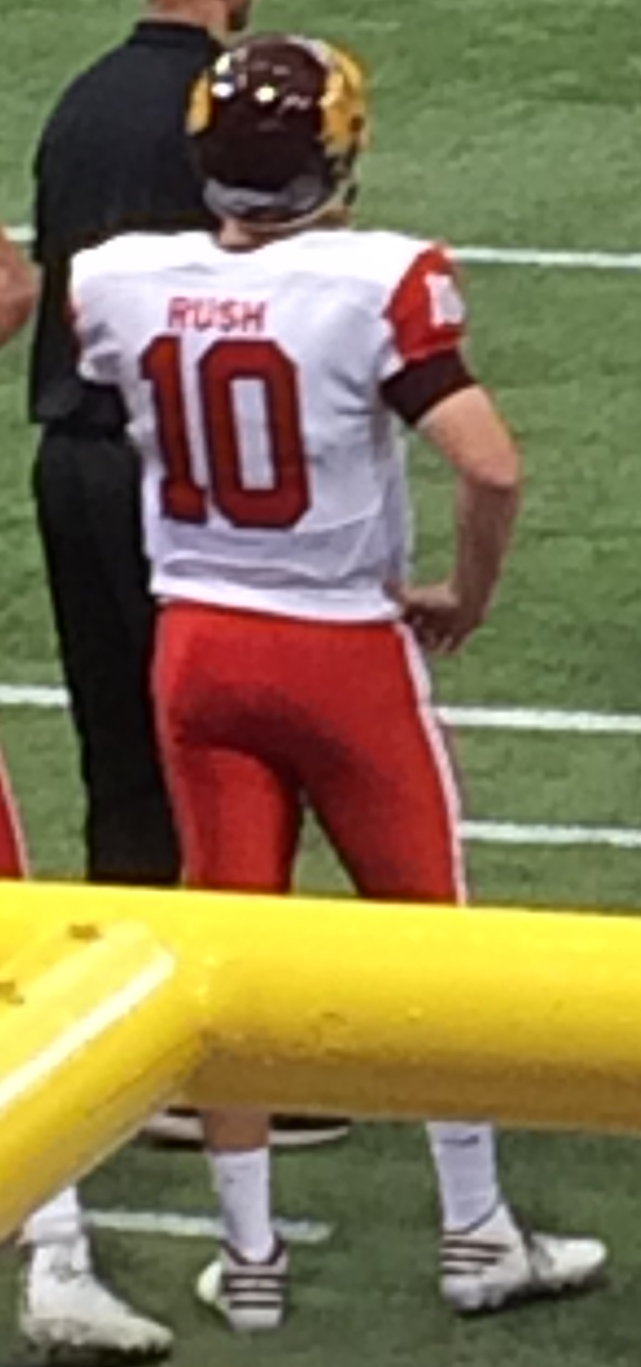
Rush in January 2017

As a sophomore, Rush played in the 2014 Bahamas Bowl against the Western Kentucky Hilltoppers. By the middle of the third quarter, his team had fallen behind 49–14, but scored four unanswered touchdowns and were down by only seven points near the end of the fourth quarter, but ultimately lost. Had the try succeeded, it would have marked the largest comeback in bowl history and tied the largest comeback in any Division I game. Rush's seven touchdown passes set an all-time record for all bowl games.

Rush's best season came as a junior in 2015. Through the first 13 games, he had 3,703 passing yards, which was a new school single-season record. Rush completed 66.3 percent of his passes for 3,848 total passing yards, 25 touchdowns, and 11 interceptions.

As a senior, Rush's production dropped to 3,540 passing yards and 23 touchdowns, but with 16 interceptions and a low 59.8 completion percentage.

Rush finished his college career with 49 straight starts, 12,894 passing yards (12 yards short of Dan LeFevour's school and conference record) and 90 touchdowns.

== Professional career ==
=== Pre-draft ===
Coming out of Central Michigan, Rush was projected by the majority of NFL draft experts and analysts to be a seventh round pick or a priority undrafted free agent. On December 6, 2016, it was announced that Rush had accepted his invitation to the East–West Shrine Game. On January 21, 2017, Rush performed in the East–West Shrine Game for the East and completed 11 of 17 pass attempts for 97 yards in a 10–3 loss to the West.

Rush received an invitation to the NFL Combine and performed almost all of the required drills except for the bench press. He had an underwhelming lackluster performance and had some of the lowest marks at the combine. On March 20, 2017, Rush participated at Central Michigan's pro day and chose to attempt the vertical jump, broad jump, short shuttle, and three-cone drill once again. He gave a slower time in the three-cone drill (7.28), but was able to have better results in the vertical (30"), broad (8'11"), and short shuttle (4.46). Rush was ranked the 14th best quarterback prospect in the draft by NFLDraftScout.com.

Pre-draft measurables
Height	Weight	Arm length	Hand span	Wingspan	40-yard dash	10-yard split	20-yard split	20-yard shuttle	Three-cone drill	Vertical jump	Broad jump
6 ft 2 5/8 in (1.90 m)	228 lb (103 kg)	32 3/8 in (0.82 m)	9 1/8 in (0.23 m)	6 ft 3 1/2 in (1.92 m)	4.93 s	1.74 s	2.89 s	4.46 s	7.23 s	30.0 in (0.76 m)	8 ft 11 in (2.72 m)
All values from NFL Combine/Pro Day

=== Dallas Cowboys (first stint) ===
==== 2017 ====
Rush was signed as an undrafted free agent by the Dallas Cowboys after the 2017 NFL draft on May 12. As a rookie, he initially competed with Zac Dysert in training camp for the job as the third-string quarterback. After Dysert suffered a herniated disc, the Cowboys signed Luke McCown to replace him on the roster.

Following multiple productive preseason performances in the Hall of Fame Game and the next two contests, Rush began to share second-team reps in practice with backup quarterback Kellen Moore before the preseason game against the Oakland Raiders. During the contest, Rush was given most of the time with the second-team offense and completed 12-of-13 passes for 115 yards and two touchdowns in the 24–20 comeback victory. He finished the preseason completing 38-of-51 passes for 398 yards, six touchdowns, and no interceptions. Head coach Jason Garrett named Rush the Cowboys' third quarterback on their depth chart, behind Dak Prescott and Moore. Rush did not dress for the first five games and was a healthy scratch.

Rush was promoted to second-string for the sixth game of the season, with Moore being released and signed to the Cowboys' practice squad. During a Week 7 40–10 road victory over the San Francisco 49ers, Rush made his NFL debut, appearing late in the game in relief of Prescott, completing one-of-three passes for two yards while also rushing twice for 13 yards.

==== 2018 ====
In 2018, Rush was the backup at quarterback from the start of organized team activities, as he never received any strong competition from rookie Mike White. Rush only played in Week 6 against the Jacksonville Jaguars, closing out a 40–7 victory in the fourth quarter, where he only handed the ball to the running backs.

==== 2019 ====
In 2019, Rush was not challenged for the backup quarterback role, so the Cowboys decided to keep only two quarterbacks on the roster, releasing White at the end of the preseason. Rush only played in the season-opener against the New York Giants and in Week 15 against the Los Angeles Rams. He did not have any pass attempts while closing out the two wins in the fourth quarter.

==== 2020 ====
On March 18, 2020, Rush re-signed with the Cowboys on a one-year restricted free agent tender. On May 4, he was waived by the Cowboys after the team signed former Cincinnati Bengals quarterback Andy Dalton and drafted Ben DiNucci in the seventh round.

=== New York Giants ===
On May 5, 2020, Rush was claimed off waivers by the New York Giants, reuniting with offensive coordinator Jason Garrett, who was his head coach with the Cowboys. On September 5, Rush was waived and signed to the practice squad the next day. On September 29, he was released from the practice squad to make room for another former Cowboys quarterback (Clayton Thorson).

=== Dallas Cowboys (second stint) ===
==== 2020 ====
On October 31, 2020, Rush was signed to the Cowboys' practice squad, to provide depth after starter Dak Prescott suffered a season-ending ankle injury and backup quarterback Andy Dalton was in concussion protocol. Rush was elevated to the active roster on November 7 for the team's Week 9 matchup against the Pittsburgh Steelers, and reverted to the practice squad after the game. He signed a reserve/future contract with the Cowboys on January 4, 2021. Rush beat out Garrett Gilbert and Ben DiNucci to be the backup quarterback for Dallas in the 2021 NFL season.

==== 2021 ====
Rush was named the starter for the Week 8 matchup against the Minnesota Vikings after Prescott was out with a calf injury. It was Rush's first NFL start. He threw for 325 yards, two touchdowns, and an interception, and led a comeback drive that ended with a passing touchdown to Amari Cooper in the final minute of the 20–16 road victory.

==== 2022 ====
On August 30, 2022, Rush was waived by the Cowboys and signed to the practice squad the next day. He was signed to the active roster on September 17 to be the starter following a thumb injury to Dak Prescott. Rush made his first start of the season during Week 2 against the Cincinnati Bengals, where he threw for 235 yards and a touchdown in the 20–17 victory.

In his second start of the season against the Giants in Week 3, Rush threw for 225 yards and a touchdown during a 23–16 road victory. In the next game against the Washington Commanders, in his third straight start of the season, Rush completed 15-of-27 passes for 223 yards and two touchdowns with a passer rating of 107.5 during the 25–10 victory. With the victory, Rush became the first quarterback in franchise history to win his first four starts. The following week against the Rams, Rush completed 10-of-16 passes for 102 yards in a 22–10 road victory. This was his fourth straight start and win during the season. After four starts in the season, Rush had the fifth highest QBR in the NFL at 66.9. During a Week 6 26–17 road loss to the Philadelphia Eagles, he completed 18-of-38 passes for 181 yards, a touchdown, and three interceptions. Rush returned to the backup role when Prescott returned in Week 7.

==== 2023 ====
On March 17, 2023, Rush re-signed with the Cowboys on a two-year contract worth $6 million. He appeared in seven games, completing 18 of 24 passes for 144 yards and an interception.

==== 2024 ====
Rush was selected as the backup quarterback behind Prescott for the beginning of the 2024 season, beating out Trey Lance in preseason play. Starting in Week 10, Rush took over as the starting quarterback after Prescott was sidelined with a hamstring injury. Rush earned his first win of the season in Week 12 against the Washington Commanders, completing 24-of-32 passes for 247 yards, two touchdowns, and zero turnovers as the Cowboys won on the road 34–26. On Thanksgiving, Rush threw for 195 yards and a touchdown, extending the Cowboys' win streak against the New York Giants to eight games as Dallas won 27–20. In Week 15, he threw a career-high three touchdown passes during a 30–14 victory against the Carolina Panthers. After starting every game since Prescott's injury, the Cowboys elected to start Lance over Rush in the season finale against the Commanders. That switch prevented Rush from hitting a play-time incentive for the 2024 season.

=== Baltimore Ravens ===
On March 18, 2025, Rush signed a two-year, $6.2 million deal that could be worth up to $12.2 million with the Baltimore Ravens.

After starter Lamar Jackson suffered a hamstring injury in Week 4, Rush was named starter. In Week 5 against the Houston Texans, his first start as a Raven, he threw three interceptions with no touchdowns in a 10–44 loss at home. In Week 6, Rush was benched for Tyler Huntley in their 17-3 home loss to the LA Rams, after a disappointing showing, in which he completed 11 of his 19 pass attempts for 72 yards and an interception. After the game, Rush was demoted to third-string duties behind Huntley after Jackson's return.

The Ravens released Rush on March 12, 2026.

=== Atlanta Falcons ===
On July 29, 2026, Rush signed with the Atlanta Falcons on a one-year, $1.3 million contract amid injuries to Michael Penix Jr. and Tua Tagovailoa. On September 11, it was announced that Rush would start the team's Week 1 road game against the Pittsburgh Steelers after Tagovailoa, who had initially been announced as the Week 1 starter, was ruled out with an oblique injury. Rush was released on October 19, 2026.

=== Tampa Bay Buccaneers ===
On November 16, 2026, Rush signed with the Tampa Bay Buccaneers' practice squad.

== Career statistics ==
Legend
**Bold**	Career high

=== NFL ===
Year	Team	Games			Passing									Rushing					Sacks		Fumbles	
Year	Team	GP	GS	Record	Cmp	Att	Pct	Yds	Avg	Lng	TD	Int	Rtg	Att	Yds	Avg	Lng	TD	Sck	SckY	Fum	Lost
2017	DAL	2	0	—	1	3	33.3	2	0.7	2	0	0	42.4	2	13	6.5	**15**	0	0	0	0	0
2018	DAL	1	0	—	0	0	—	0	—	0	0	0	—	0	0	—	0	0	0	0	0	0
2019	DAL	2	0	—	0	0	—	0	—	0	0	0	—	0	0	—	0	0	0	0	0	0
2020	NYG	0	0	—	DNP																	
2021	DAL	5	1	**1–0**	30	47	63.8	422	**9.0**	**73**	3	1	**105.1**	9	-8	-0.9	2	0	3	19	1	1
2022	DAL	9	5	4–1	94	162	58.0	1,051	6.5	46	5	3	80.0	9	6	0.7	6	0	7	49	2	0
2023	DAL	7	0	—	18	24	**75.0**	144	6.0	29	0	1	72.2	12	-5	-0.4	6	0	1	8	0	0
2024	DAL	12	8	4–4	**187**	**308**	60.7	**1,844**	6.0	64	**12**	**5**	83.8	**26**	18	0.7	9	0	**13**	**95**	**9**	**3**
2025	BAL	4	2	0–2	34	52	65.3	303	5.8	56	0	4	48.8	4	-4	-1.0		0	1	16	1	1
2026	ATL	2	2	0–2	22	39	56.4	229	5.9	24	1	4	42.5	2	**20**	**10.0**	11	0	5	28	1	0
Career		44	18	9–9	386	635	60.8	3,995	6.3	73	21	18	78.2	64	40	0.6	15	0	30	215	14	5

=== College ===
Season	Team	Games			Passing								Rushing			
Season	Team	GP	GS	Record	Cmp	Att	Pct	Yds	Avg	TD	INT	Rtg	Att	Yds	Avg	TD
2012	Central Michigan	Redshirt														
2013	Central Michigan	11	10	5–5	177	312	56.7	2,349	7.5	15	15	126.2	38	-84	-2.2	1
2014	Central Michigan	13	13	**7–6**	243	382	63.6	3,157	8.3	**27**	13	**149.6**	46	-51	-1.1	0
2015	Central Michigan	13	13	**7–6**	**324**	**489**	**66.3**	**3,848**	**7.9**	25	11	144.7	63	**48**	**0.8**	**3**
2016	Central Michigan	13	13	6–7	278	465	59.8	3,540	7.6	23	**16**	133.2	**68**	-21	-0.3	1
Career		50	49	25–24	1,022	1,648	62.0	12,894	7.8	90	55	139.1	215	-108	-0.5	5

== Personal life ==
Rush is married.
