= Titus Davis =

American football player (1993–2020)

No. 84
- Position: Wide receiver

Personal information
- Born: January 3, 1993; Wheaton, Illinois, U.S.
- Died: November 11, 2020 (aged 27)
- Listed height: 6 ft 1 in (1.85 m)
- Listed weight: 200 lb (91 kg)

Career information
- High school: Wheaton Warrenville South (Wheaton, Illinois)
- College: Central Michigan (2011–2014)
- NFL draft: 2015: undrafted

Career history
- San Diego Chargers (2015)*; New York Jets (2015)*; Buffalo Bills (2015)*; New York Jets (2015–2016)*; Chicago Bears (2017)*
- * Offseason or practice squad member only

Awards and highlights
- 2× First-team All-MAC (2013, 2014); Second-team All-MAC (2012); Third-team All-MAC (2011)
- Stats at Pro Football Reference

Titus Davis (January 3, 1993 – November 11, 2020) was an American football player. He played college football for the Central Michigan Chippewas, and holds the school records for both career receiving yards and touchdowns. Davis was signed by the San Diego Chargers as an undrafted free agent in 2015. His younger brother, Corey, was a wide receiver for the New York Jets.

== Early life ==
Davis attended Wheaton Warrenville South High School in Wheaton, Illinois and starred alongside his brother and eventual Western Michigan Broncos standout, Corey Davis. In 2010, he helped lead the team to a perfect 14–0 record and an Illinois Class 7A state championship, where he caught six passes for 104 yards and two touchdowns in the state championship game. He finished the season with 58 receptions for 1,239 yards and 18 touchdowns, earning All-state honors from the Chicago Tribune and Champaign Gazette. Davis was also a state qualifier in the long jump (best of 7.29 meters or 23 feet, 11 inches), 4 × 100m (42.14 seconds) and 4 × 200m (1:27.82 minutes) in track & field as a junior. He also competed in sprints and posted personal-best times of 11.14 seconds in the 100-meter dash and 22.24 seconds in the 200-meter dash.

== College career ==
Davis played at Central Michigan University from 2011 to 2014. For his career he had 204 receptions and broke school records with 3,700 yards and 37 touchdowns, both of which were previously held by Antonio Brown. Davis was a 4 time All-MAC selection and a freshman All American. He capped off his career at CMU scoring the ESPY nominated three-lateral TD with no time remaining against Western Kentucky in the 2014 Bahamas Bowl. Davis was the first player in NCAA FBS history with 8 or more receiving touchdowns in four seasons.

== Professional career ==
=== Pre-draft ===
Pre-draft measurables
Height	Weight	Arm length	Hand span	40-yard dash	10-yard split	20-yard split	20-yard shuttle	Three-cone drill	Vertical jump	Broad jump
6 ft 0 3/4 in (1.85 m)	196 lb (89 kg)	29 5/8 in (0.75 m)	8 1/4 in (0.21 m)	4.51 s	1.60 s	2.65 s	4.28 s	7.14 s	32.5 in (0.83 m)	9 ft 11 in (3.02 m)
All values from NFL Combine

=== San Diego Chargers ===
Immediately following the draft, Davis signed a free agent deal with the San Diego Chargers. On August 30, 2015, Davis was released from the San Diego Chargers.

=== New York Jets ===
On September 23, 2015, Davis was signed to the New York Jets practice squad. On October 14, 2015, Davis was released.

=== Buffalo Bills ===
On October 20, 2015, Davis was signed to the Buffalo Bills practice squad. On November 9, 2015, Davis was released.

=== New York Jets (second stint) ===
On November 16, 2015, Davis was signed to the New York Jets practice squad. On November 26, 2015, Davis was released.

Davis signed a future/reserve contract on January 28, 2016. Davis informed the team on August 6, 2016 that he no longer wanted to play football and abruptly retired.

=== Chicago Bears ===
On May 14, 2017, Davis was signed by the Chicago Bears after a tryout at their rookie minicamp. He was waived by the Bears on September 2, 2017.

== Personal life ==
Davis was a father of two. His brother, Corey, is a former wide receiver who attended Western Michigan University and played for the Tennessee Titans and the New York Jets.

By July 2020, Davis was diagnosed with renal medullary carcinoma, a rare kidney cancer. He died at age 27 on November 11, 2020.
