= Zurlon Tipton =

American football player (1990–2016)

No. 37
- Position: Running back

Personal information
- Born: April 27, 1990; Detroit, Michigan, U.S.
- Died: June 28, 2016 (aged 26); Detroit, Michigan, U.S.
- Listed height: 6 ft 0 in (1.83 m)
- Listed weight: 221 lb (100 kg)

Career information
- High school: Parkway Christian (Sterling Heights, Michigan)
- College: Central Michigan (2009–2013)
- NFL draft: 2014: undrafted

Career history
- Indianapolis Colts (2014–2015)

Awards and highlights
- Second-team All-MAC (2012)

Career NFL statistics
- Rushing attempts: 15
- Rushing yards: 38
- Receptions: 11
- Receiving yards: 125
- Receiving touchdowns: 1
- Stats at Pro Football Reference

Zurlon Tipton (April 27, 1990 – June 28, 2016) was an American professional football player who was a running back in the National Football League (NFL). He played college football for the Central Michigan Chippewas and signed with the Indianapolis Colts as an undrafted free agent in 2014.

== College career ==
Tipton played college football at Central Michigan University. During his career, he rushed for 2,463 yards on 461 carries with 34 touchdowns.

== Professional career ==
Pre-draft measurables
Height	Weight	Arm length	Hand span	40-yard dash	10-yard split	20-yard split	20-yard shuttle	Three-cone drill	Vertical jump	Broad jump	Bench press
5 ft 11 3/4 in (1.82 m)	223 lb (101 kg)	32 1/8 in (0.82 m)	9 3/8 in (0.24 m)	4.70 s	1.64 s	2.66 s	4.48 s	6.89 s	32.0 in (0.81 m)	9 ft 11 in (3.02 m)	17 reps
All values from Pro Day

=== Indianapolis Colts ===
Tipton was signed by the Indianapolis Colts after going undrafted in the 2014 NFL draft. Tipton performed well in the preseason and made the Colts initial 53 man roster, but was waived on September 9, 2014, and re-signed to the practice squad shortly afterward. On November 22, Tipton was promoted to the active roster when Griff Whalen was waived.

After seeing some limited action on special teams, Tipton played running back against the Dallas Cowboys and scored his first NFL touchdown on a 1-yard pass from Matt Hasselbeck.

Tipton saw the first significant game action of his pro football career in the Colts' first game of the 2014 playoffs, supplanting the role of former third-overall Cleveland Browns draft pick Trent Richardson as the second running back behind Dan Herron. He carried the ball 11 times for a total of 40 yards, and also recorded a single reception for six yards. The Colts defeated the visiting Cincinnati Bengals by a score of 26–10 in the game. In the AFC Championship against the New England Patriots, Tipton scored his first NFL rushing touchdown.

On September 5, 2015, Tipton was waived by the Colts, but signed to the practice squad on September 17, 2015. He was signed shortly after to the active roster.

On November 26, 2015, Tipton was again waived by the Colts. He was signed by the Colts again on November 30, and waived again on December 21.

== NFL career statistics ==
=== Regular season ===
Year	Team	Games		Rushing					Receiving					Fumbles	
Year	Team	GP	GS	Att	Yds	Avg	Lng	TD	Rec	Yds	Avg	Lng	TD	Fum	Lost
2014	IND	6	0	10	18	1.8	9	0	6	68	11.3	32	1	0	0
2015	IND	7	0	2	9	4.5	7	0	0	0	0.0	0	0	0	0
Total		13	0	12	27	2.2	9	0	6	68	11.3	32	1	0	0

=== Postseason ===
Year	Team	Games		Rushing					Receiving					Fumbles	
Year	Team	GP	GS	Att	Yds	Avg	Lng	TD	Rec	Yds	Avg	Lng	TD	Fum	Lost
2014	IND	3	0	18	68	3.8	11	1	3	22	7.3	12	0	0	0
Total		3	0	18	68	3.8	11	1	3	22	7.3	12	0	0	0

== Personal life ==
=== Legal history ===
On December 25, 2015, Tipton was arrested and charged with criminal recklessness with a deadly weapon, after reportedly firing a single shot from his AR-15 rifle into his girlfriend's house. He was released on a $3,000 bond.

=== Death ===
On June 28, 2016, Tipton accidentally shot himself in the stomach while removing a bag containing two guns from his car. He was taken to the hospital in good condition but died shortly afterwards.
