= Brian Pruitt =

American football player

Profile
- Position: Running back

Personal information
- Born: c. 1974

Career information
- College: Central Michigan (1992–1994)

Awards and highlights
- First-team All-American (1994); MAC most valuable player (1994)

Brian Pruitt (born c. 1974) is a former American football running back for the Central Michigan Chippewas from 1992 to 1994. He attended Arthur Hill High School in Saginaw, Michigan, before enrolling at Central Michigan.

In 1994, he ranked second nationally with 1,890 rushing yards, an average of 6.5 yards per carry, and 20 touchdowns. He was also selected by the Associated Press as a first-team player on the 1994 All-America college football team, won the 1994 MAC most valuable player award, and helped the 1994 Central Michigan Chippewas football team win the Mid-American Conference (MAC) championship. He set multiple MAC single-game records with 356 rushing yards, five touchdowns, and 435 all-purpose yards in a game against Toledo. In three years at Central Michigan, he tallied 3,693 rushing yards, 786 yards on punt returns, and 34 touchdowns. Pruitt was inducted into the Saginaw County Sports Hall of Fame in 2004 and the Central Michigan Athletic Hall of Fame in 2005.

Pruitt signed with the Atlanta Falcons as a free agent in 1995, but a neck injury ended his career. He later became a motivational speaker.
