= Dan Bazuin =

American football player (born 1983)

No. 73
- Position: Defensive end

Personal information
- Born: July 22, 1983 (age 43); McBain, Michigan, U.S.
- Listed height: 6 ft 3 in (1.91 m)
- Listed weight: 260 lb (118 kg)

Career information
- High school: McBain
- College: Central Michigan (2003–2006)
- NFL draft: 2007: 2nd round, 62nd overall pick

Career history
- Chicago Bears (2007); Houston Texans (2008)*
- * Offseason or practice squad member only

Awards and highlights
- 3× First-team All-MAC (2004, 2005, 2006); MAC Defensive Player of the Year (2005)

Daniel Bazuin (born July 22, 1983) is an American former professional football player who was a defensive end in the National Football League (NFL). He played college football for the Central Michigan Chippewas and was selected by the Chicago Bears in the second round the 2007 NFL draft.

== College career ==
Bazuin played at Central Michigan University from 2003 to 2006 for the Chippewas. At the time he left Central Michigan, he was the team's career leader in sacks and tackles for loss. He was selected as the MAC Conference Defensive player of the year for the 2006 season. He graduated with a bachelor's degree in marketing.

== Professional career ==
=== Chicago Bears ===
The Bears signed Bazuin to a four-year contract on July 25, 2007. Bazuin was placed on injured reserve on September 1, 2007, by the Chicago Bears due to a knee injury. On August 29, 2008, Bazuin was waived by the Bears after requiring a second operation on the same knee.

=== Houston Texans ===
Bazuin was signed to the practice squad of the Houston Texans on December 5, 2008.
