= Jonathan Ward (American football) =

American football player (born 1997)

Profile
- Position: Running back

Personal information
- Born: September 30, 1997 (age 29); Kankakee, Illinois, U.S.
- Listed height: 5 ft 11 in (1.80 m)
- Listed weight: 202 lb (92 kg)

Career information
- High school: Bishop McNamara (Kankakee)
- College: Central Michigan (2016–2019)
- NFL draft: 2020: undrafted

Career history
- Arizona Cardinals (2020–2022); New York Jets (2022)*; Tennessee Titans (2022–2023); Pittsburgh Steelers (2024); New York Giants (2025)*; New England Patriots (2025)*; Baltimore Ravens (2025–2026)*
- * Offseason or practice squad member only

Awards and highlights
- Second-team All-MAC (2017); Third-team All-MAC (2019)

Career NFL statistics as of 2025
- Rushing yards: 91
- Rushing average: 4.1
- Receptions: 6
- Receiving yards: 52
- Receiving touchdowns: 1
- Stats at Pro Football Reference

Jonathan Ward (born September 30, 1997) is an American professional football running back. He has previously played in the NFL for the Arizona Cardinals, New York Jets, Tennessee Titans, Pittsburgh Steelers, and New England Patriots. He played college football for the Central Michigan Chippewas.

== College career ==
Ward was a member of the Central Michigan Chippewas for four seasons. He finished his collegiate career with 2,539 yards and 28 touchdowns on 473 carries and 98 receptions for 909 yards and four touchdowns.

== Professional career ==
Pre-draft measurables
Height	Weight	Arm length	Hand span	Wingspan
5 ft 10 3/4 in (1.80 m)	195 lb (88 kg)	31 in (0.79 m)	10 1/4 in (0.26 m)	6 ft 3 1/2 in (1.92 m)
All values from Pro Day

=== Arizona Cardinals ===
Ward was signed by the Arizona Cardinals as an undrafted free agent on April 25, 2020. He was waived on September 5, 2020, during final roster cuts and was re-signed to the team's practice squad the next day. Ward was elevated to the Cardinals' active roster on September 26, 2020, and made his NFL debut the following day against the Detroit Lions. He reverted to the practice squad after the game. He was elevated again on October 3 for the week 4 game against the Carolina Panthers, and reverted to the practice squad again following the game. He was promoted to the active roster on October 6, 2020.

In Week 17 of the 2020 season against the Los Angeles Rams, Ward recorded his first career reception for an eleven yard touchdown during the 18–7 loss.

On October 12, 2022, Ward was placed on injured reserve with a hamstring injury. He was released on November 22.

=== New York Jets ===
On November 29, 2022, Ward was signed to the New York Jets practice squad. He was released on December 6.

=== Tennessee Titans ===
On December 14, 2022, Ward was signed to the Tennessee Titans practice squad. He was promoted to the active roster on December 29. He was waived on August 28. Ward was then re-signed to the Titans practice squad on October 24. He was promoted to the active roster on November 11, but waived a week later. Ward was then signed to the practice squad on November 21. He was signed to the active roster on December 11.

=== Pittsburgh Steelers ===
On May 21, 2024, Ward signed a one-year contract with the Pittsburgh Steelers. He was released on August 27, and re-signed to the practice squad. Ward was promoted to the active roster on October 28 and released on November 9. He was re-signed to the team's practice squad on November 13. Ward was waived on December 4 and re-signed to the practice squad two days later.

Ward signed a reserve/future contract with Pittsburgh on January 20, 2025. He was released by the Steelers on June 19.

=== New York Giants ===
On August 4, 2025, Ward signed a contract with the New York Giants. He was released on August 26 as part of final roster cuts.

=== New England Patriots ===
On October 28, 2025, Ward signed with the New England Patriots' practice squad. He was released on November 4, but was re-signed to the practice squad a week later. Ward was released again on November 25.

=== Baltimore Ravens ===
On December 2, 2025, Ward was signed to the Baltimore Ravens' practice squad.

On August 16, 2026, Ward re-signed with Baltimore on a one-year contract worth $1.1 million. On August 30, Ward was released by Baltimore as a part of final roster cuts; he was re-signed to the team's practice squad the next day. He was released on October 27.
