= Michael Heldman =

American football player (born 2003)

No. 49 – Kansas City Chiefs
- Position: Defensive end
- Roster status: Practice squad

Personal information
- Born: January 2, 2003 (age 23); Romeo, Michigan, U.S.
- Listed height: 6 ft 3 in (1.91 m)
- Listed weight: 268 lb (122 kg)

Career information
- High school: Romeo (Romeo, Michigan)
- College: Central Michigan (2021–2025)
- NFL draft: 2026: undrafted

Career history
- New Orleans Saints (2026)*; Kansas City Chiefs (2026–present)*
- * Offseason or practice squad member only

Awards and highlights
- First-team All-MAC (2025)
- Stats at Pro Football Reference

Michael Heldman (born January 2, 2003) is an American football defensive lineman for the Kansas City Chiefs of the National Football League (NFL). He played college football for the Central Michigan Chippewas.

== Early life ==
Heldman attended Romeo High School in Romeo, Michigan. He committed to play college football for the Central Michigan Chippewas.

== College career ==
In his first four seasons from 2021 to 2024, Heldman played in 39 games, totaling 72 tackles with 17.5 being for a loss, eight and a half sacks, a pass deflection, and two forced fumbles. In 2025, he notched 48 tackles with 16.5 being for a loss, 10.5 sacks, and two forced fumbles, earning first-team all-MAC honors. After the season, he declared for the NFL draft.

== Professional career ==
Pre-draft measurables
Height	Weight	Arm length	Hand span	Wingspan	40-yard dash	10-yard split	20-yard split	20-yard shuttle	Three-cone drill	Vertical jump	Broad jump	Bench press
6 ft 3 7/8 in (1.93 m)	268 lb (122 kg)	31 1/2 in (0.80 m)	9 1/2 in (0.24 m)	6 ft 6 1/8 in (1.98 m)	4.70 s	1.64 s	2.73 s	4.31 s	7.05 s	40.0 in (1.02 m)	10 ft 3 in (3.12 m)	29 reps
All values from Pro Day

=== New Orleans Saints ===
After going unselected in the 2026 NFL draft, Heldman signed with the New Orleans Saints as an undrafted free agent. On August 30, Heldman was placed on season-ending injured reserve. On September 3, Heldman was waived by New Orleans with an injury settlement.

=== Kansas City Chiefs ===
On September 16, 2026, Heldman was signed to the Kansas City Chiefs' practice squad.
