= 2012 Little Caesars Pizza Bowl =

Western Kentucky Hilltoppers	Central Michigan Chippewas
(7–5)	(6–6)
Sun Belt	MAC
21	24
Head coach: Lance Guidry	Head coach: Dan Enos
	1	2	3	4	Total
Western Kentucky	7	7	7	0	21
Central Michigan	14	3	0	7	24
- Date: December 26, 2012
- Season: 2012
- Stadium: Ford Field
- Location: Detroit, Michigan
- MVP: Ryan Radcliff - CMU; Lineman of the Game: Shamari Benton (LB) - CMU
- Favorite: W. Kentucky by 5
- Referee: David Epperley (ACC)
- Attendance: 23,310

United States TV coverage
- Network: ESPN
- Announcers: Mark Neely (Play-by-Play); Ray Bentley (Analyst); Jemele Hill (Sidelines)

The 2012 Little Caesars Pizza Bowl, the 16th edition of the game, was a post-season American college football bowl game that was held on December 26, 2012 at Ford Field in Detroit, Michigan as part of the 2012–13 NCAA football bowl season.

The game was telecasted at 7:30 pm ET on ESPN. It featured the Western Kentucky Hilltoppers from the Sun Belt Conference against the Central Michigan Chippewas from the Mid-American Conference and was the final game of the 2012 NCAA Division I FBS football season for both teams. The Hilltoppers accepted their invitation after finishing 7–5 during their regular season, while the Chippewas accepted theirs after finishing 6–6. Central Michigan won the game by a score of 24-21 over Western Kentucky.

== Teams ==
Under normal circumstances, the Little Caesars Pizza Bowl would feature the eighth bowl-eligible team from the Big Ten Conference against the Mid-American Conference champions. However, with the Big Ten only fielding seven bowl-eligible teams and the MAC champion Northern Illinois Huskies playing in the 2013 Orange Bowl, the spots were open this year.

This was the first meeting between these two teams.

=== Central Michigan ===
The Chippewas finished in fourth place in the MAC's West Division, also finishing with a 4–4 conference record. After claiming a 6–6 mark in the regular season, the Chippewas accepted an invite to the 2012 Little Caesars Pizza Bowl.

This was the Chippewas' fourth Little Caesars Pizza Bowl; thus far their record in the game was 1–2, defeating the Middle Tennessee Blue Raiders 31–14 in the 2006 game, but losing to the Purdue Boilermakers 51–48 in the 2007 game and to the Florida Atlantic Owls 24–21 in the 2008 game.

=== WKU ===
The Hilltoppers finished in fifth place in the Sun Belt Conference with a 4–4 record. After claiming a 7–5 mark in the regular season, the Hilltoppers accepted an invite to the 2012 Little Caesars Pizza Bowl.

This was the first bowl game in school history for the Hilltoppers, being one of two teams making their bowl debut this season (along with fellow Sun Belt member the Louisiana–Monroe Warhawks).

On December 7, Hilltoppers head coach Willie Taggart accepted the vacant head coaching position at South Florida. Defensive coordinator Lance Guidry was named as interim head coach for the bowl game. Although WKU hired Bobby Petrino as Taggart's permanent replacement three days later, it announced that Guidry would still coach in Detroit.

This was Guidry's second stint as an interim head coach at an FBS program. He had previously been interim coach at Miami (OH) in the 2010–11 bowl season, coaching the RedHawks to a win in the 2011 GoDaddy.com Bowl. His coaching stint at Miami was most noted for his locker-room speech to the RedHawks just before the bowl, a 90-second reflection on the history of the program that went viral. The win made the 2010 RedHawks the first team in FBS history to follow a 10-loss season with a 10-win season.

== Scoring summary ==
Scoring summary

Quarter	Time	Drive			Team	Scoring information	Score	
Quarter	Time	Plays	Yards	TOP	Team	Scoring information	Western Kentucky	Central Michigan
1	10:54	8	83	4:06	Central Michigan	Andrew Flory 69-yard touchdown reception from Ryan Radcliff, David Harman kick good	0	7
1	9:27	3	77	1:27	Western Kentucky	Kawaun Jakes 6-yard touchdown run, Garrett Schwettman kick good	7	7
1	5:46	5	73	3:41	Central Michigan	Andrew Flory 29-yard touchdown reception from Ryan Radcliff, David Harman kick good	7	14
2	9:59	8	48	5:01	Central Michigan	50-yard field goal by David Harman	7	17
2	6:48	6	75	3:11	Western Kentucky	Jack Doyle 6-yard touchdown reception from Kawaun Jakes, Garrett Schwettman kick good	14	17
3	1:24	16	80	9:23	Western Kentucky	Kadeem Jones 1-yard touchdown run, Garrett Schwettman kick good	21	17
4	5:11	3	27	1:44	Central Michigan	Cody Wilson 11-yard touchdown reception from Ryan Radcliff, David Harman kick good	21	24
"TOP" = time of possession. For other American football terms, see Glossary of American football.							21	24

=== Statistics ===
Statistic	WKU	CMU
First downs	13	23
Total offense, plays - yards	56-327	65-393
Rushes-yards (net)	32-128	34-140
Passing yards (net)	199	253
Passes, Comp-Att-Int	14-24-0	19-31-0
Time of Possession	28:10	31:50
