= Dan LeFevour =

American gridiron football player (born 1987)

No. 5, 6, 8, 13, 15, 19
- Position: Quarterback

Personal information
- Born: March 19, 1987 (age 39); Downers Grove, Illinois, U.S.
- Listed height: 6 ft 3 in (1.91 m)
- Listed weight: 230 lb (104 kg)

Career information
- High school: Benet Academy (Lisle, Illinois)
- College: Central Michigan (2006–2009)
- NFL draft: 2010: 6th round, 181st overall pick

Career history
- Chicago Bears (2010)*; Cincinnati Bengals (2010); Indianapolis Colts (2011)*; Jacksonville Jaguars (2011); Hamilton Tiger-Cats (2012–2014); Montreal Alouettes (2015); Tampa Bay Buccaneers (2016)*; Toronto Argonauts (2016); Winnipeg Blue Bombers (2017)
- * Offseason or practice squad member only

Awards and highlights
- MAC Most Valuable Player (2009); 2× MAC Offensive Player of the Year (2007, 2009); MAC Freshman of the Year (2006); 3× First-team All-MAC (2006, 2007, 2009); Second-team All-MAC (2008)

Career CFL statistics
- Passing yards: 2,620
- TD–INT: 11–14
- Passer rating: 82.8
- Stats at CFL.ca
- Stats at Pro Football Reference

Daniel Terrence LeFevour (born March 19, 1987) is an American former professional football player who was a quarterback in the Canadian Football League (CFL). He was selected in the sixth round of the 2010 NFL draft by the Chicago Bears and spent time with three other NFL teams (without appearing in a regular-season game) before entering the CFL in 2012. Before his professional career begun, he played college football for the Central Michigan Chippewas. Known as a dual-threat quarterback, LeFevour previously held the record for most touchdowns scored (e.g., by passing, running and catching the ball) in the history of the NCAA, with 148 touchdowns scored. Case Keenum surpassed that record in 2011.

== Early life ==
LeFevour graduated from Benet Academy in Lisle, Illinois in 2005. He started his high school career as the freshman team running back. Due to injuries at quarterback on the freshman team Dan stepped up in the final game and led the team successfully as their signal caller. After success at quarterback, he joined the varsity team his sophomore year. LeFevour became the full-time starting quarterback midseason. He continued on to start both his junior and senior years and was named the Offensive Player of the Year during his senior campaign. During his career at Benet, he threw for 2,929 yards (3rd most in school history), and completed 173 passes, 24 for touchdowns. His senior season, LeFevour passed for 945 yards and 7 touchdowns while compiling 634 rushing yards and 13 rushing touchdowns. LeFevour broke the all-time touchdown record for Benet with 54 scores in his career. He was named to the ESCC All-Conference team his senior year, and was also recognized as honorable mention all-state.

On February 4, 2011, LeFevour had his number 11 jersey retired at Benet, becoming the first football player to have that honor.

== College career ==
LeFevour led Central Michigan University to three Mid-American Conference championships in his four years and finished in the Top 25 in the nation in the final January 2010 AP Poll and USA Today Coaches Poll from the 2009–10 season. As a freshman and sophomore he led CMU to a bowl victory and a last second bowl loss in two Motor City Bowl games, drawing record crowds of 54,113 and 60,624 fans in December 2006 and 2007. He was named the bowl game's MVP as a redshirt freshman. Dan was one of 35 players named to the Manning Award Watch List in August 2007. He was named Mid-American Conference West Division Player of the Week for two consecutive weeks in October 2007, and again in the second week of November. LeFevour also garnered USA Today's Player of the Week for the week of October 16, 2007. On December 1, 2007, LeFevour became the second player in Division I FBS history to pass for over 3,000 yards and rush for over 1,000 yards in a single season (Vince Young was the first). On September 12, 2009, at Michigan State, LeFevour passed Byron Leftwich to take over as the MAC all-time leader in total offense in a career. He currently holds Mid American Conference records for career completions, attempts, passing yards, passing touchdowns, total touchdowns, and total offensive yards. LeFevour is the only player in NCAA history with over 12,000 passing yards and 2,500 rushing yards and currently sits 2nd all time in total offensive yards. He was responsible for 150 total touchdowns, placing him in second place among FBS quarterbacks.

=== Statistics ===
Season	Team	Passing								Rushing			
Season	Team	Cmp	Att	Pct	Yds	Y/A	TD	Int	Rtg	Att	Yds	Avg	TD
2006	Central Michigan	247	388	63.7	3,031	7.8	26	10	146.2	132	521	3.9	7
2007	Central Michigan	355	543	65.4	3,652	6.7	27	13	133.5	188	1,122	6.0	19
2008	Central Michigan	251	376	66.8	2,784	7.4	21	6	144.2	168	592	3.5	6
2009	Central Michigan	318	456	69.7	3,438	7.5	28	7	150.3	183	713	3.9	15
Career		1,171	1,763	66.4	12,905	7.3	102	36	142.9	671	2,948	4.4	47

=== Awards and accolades ===
- 2006 MAC Freshman of the Year
- 2006 All-MAC first-team selection
- 2006 Honorable mention Freshman All-American by Sporting News
- 2006 Academic All-MAC honoree
- 2006 Motor City Bowl MVP
- 2007 USA Today Player of the Week
- 2007 MAC Offensive Player of the Year
- 2007 MAC Championship Game MVP
- 2007 All-MAC first-team selection
- 2008 All-MAC second-team selection
- 2009 MAC Offensive Player of the Year
- 2009 All-MAC first-team selection
- 2009 MVP of the MAC Championship Game
- 2010 GMAC Bowl MVP
- 2010 Senior Bowl North team most outstanding player
- 2010 set the NCAA record for most total touchdowns by a Quarterback. 150. (102 passing, 47 rushing, 1 receiving)
- Most TDs in a Career – 150 – Dan LeFevour, Central Michigan, 2006–2009
- Most Points Responsible For, Career – 910 – Dan LeFevour, Central Michigan, 2006–2009

== Professional career ==
Pre-draft measurables
Height	Weight	Arm length	Hand span	40-yard dash	10-yard split	20-yard split	20-yard shuttle	Three-cone drill	Vertical jump	Broad jump
6 ft 3 1/4 in (1.91 m)	230 lb (104 kg)	32 1/2 in (0.83 m)	9 1/4 in (0.23 m)	4.66 s	1.59 s	2.71 s	4.22 s	6.93 s	29.5 in (0.75 m)	9 ft 2 in (2.79 m)
All values from NFL Combine

=== Chicago Bears ===
LeFevour was selected by the Chicago Bears in the sixth round (181st overall) of the 2010 NFL draft. He struggled through the 2010 preseason, completing 19 of 41 passes (46.3%), with 204 pass yards, one touchdown, one interception, six sacks, and 38 rushing yards. Chicago signed veteran Todd Collins to be the third-string quarterback, and waived LeFevour after the 2010 preseason in hopes of placing him on the practice squad.

=== Cincinnati Bengals ===
LeFevour was claimed off waivers by the Cincinnati Bengals the next day, and spent the 2010 season as the third-string quarterback, but did not see any action. He was waived on September 4, 2011, but was signed to the practice squad the next day. On September 6, he was released from the practice squad in favor of quarterback Zac Robinson, formerly of the Detroit Lions.

=== Indianapolis Colts ===
LeFevour was signed to the Indianapolis Colts' practice squad on November 8, 2011.

=== Jacksonville Jaguars ===
On November 25, 2011, the Jacksonville Jaguars signed LeFevour off of the Colts' practice squad. He was released by the team on May 7, 2012.

=== Hamilton Tiger-Cats ===
On June 4, 2012, the Hamilton Tiger-Cats of the Canadian Football League signed LeFevour as a free agent. LeFevour dressed for all 18 games of the 2012 CFL season with the Ticats as the third-string quarterback, but did not receive any playing time.

Prior to the 2013 CFL season, LeFevour competed against Brian Brohm and Jeremiah Masoli, both from the now-inactive United Football League, for the backup quarterback position. He played a prominent role in both preseason games, completing 17 of 29 passing attempts for 229 yards, 1 touchdown and 0 interceptions, and secured the second-string position (Masoli took third string and Brohm was placed on injured reserve). After starter Henry Burris had a mediocre start of the season, LeFevour saw his first CFL regular-season game action in week 6 of the 2013 season, playing spot duty mostly in short-yardage situations where Burris was having particular difficulty and LeFevour's running and scrambling skills were put to use. LeFevour's efforts helped the Tiger-Cats win that game, 30–29 over the Edmonton Eskimos.

LeFevour began the 2014 season demoted to third on the depth chart; although Burris left for the Ottawa Redblacks and Brohm was traded to the Winnipeg Blue Bombers, the team signed Zach Collaros during the offseason as Burris's replacement and promoted Masoli to second string. After both Collaros and Masoli proved to be ineffective during the first three games (all losses) of the season (and Collaros sustained an injury), LeFevour was promoted to starting quarterback. On July 26, 2014, LeFevour made his first CFL start, against the Ottawa Redblacks at a game played at Ron Joyce Stadium. He led Hamilton to a 33–23 win, throwing for 361 yards and a touchdown while rushing for 109 yards and another touchdown. By the end of the season LeFevour attempted 149 passes, completing 101 (67.8%) for 1,276 yards with 4 touchdowns and 4 interceptions. Following the 2014 season he was not resigned by the Tiger-Cats and became a free-agent on February 10, 2015.

=== Montreal Alouettes ===
On February 25, 2015, LeFevour signed a contract with the Montreal Alouettes of the Canadian Football League. He suffered a season-ending dislocated shoulder in the first game of the 2015 season after coming into the game in relief of injured starter Jonathan Crompton.

=== Tampa Bay Buccaneers ===
LeFevour was signed by the Tampa Bay Buccaneers on April 19, 2016. On August 3, 2016, LeFevour was released by the Buccaneers.

=== Toronto Argonauts ===
On August 8, 2016, LeFevour signed a practice roster agreement with the Toronto Argonauts of the Canadian Football League. Following an injury to starting quarterback Ricky Ray LeFevour took over the starting role for 3 games before being replaced part-way through this third game by Drew Willy whom the Argos had traded for following Ray's injury. During his brief stint with the Argonauts, LeFevour completed 73 passes on 105 pass attempts (69.52%) for 779 yards passing. He threw for 6 touchdowns and 6 interceptions in that span. He also carried the ball for 155 yards on 41 carries (3.8 yards/attempt).

=== Winnipeg Blue Bombers ===
Upon entering free agency, LeFevour signed with the Winnipeg Blue Bombers on February 16, 2017. He saw limited playing time with the Winnipeg Blue Bombers, playing primarily in short-yardage behind Matt Nichols during the 2017 Winnipeg Blue Bombers season. He was the starting quarterback for the Bombers for their final regular season game against the Calgary Stampeders, completing 13 of his 17 pass attempts for 91 yards in the 23–5 victory. He also had considerable playing time in the fourth quarter in the Bombers' 36–27 loss to the BC Lions the week prior, completing 5 of his 12 pass attempts for 42 yards, being intercepted twice in the game by the Lions defense.

On February 10, 2018, LeFevour announced his retirement from the CFL via his personal Twitter account.

== See also ==
- List of Division I FBS passing yardage leaders
- List of Division I FBS passing touchdown leaders
