= 1932 Ohio Bobcats football team =

American college football season

1932 Ohio Bobcats football
- Conference: Buckeye Athletic Association
- Record: 7–2 (3–1 BAA)
- Head coach: Don Peden (9th season)
- Home stadium: Ohio Field

1932 Buckeye Athletic Association football standings
	Conf.					Overall
Team	W		L		T	W		L		T
Miami (OH) $	5	–	0	–	0	7	–	1	–	0
Ohio	3	–	1	–	0	7	–	2	–	0
Cincinnati	2	–	2	–	0	7	–	2	–	0
Ohio Wesleyan	2	–	2	–	0	5	–	4	–	0
Wittenberg	1	–	4	–	0	3	–	6	–	0
Denison	0	–	4	–	0	2	–	6	–	0
$ – Conference champion

The 1932 Ohio Bobcats football team was an American football team that represented Ohio University as a member of the Buckeye Athletic Association (BAA) during the 1932 college football season. In their ninth season under head coach Don Peden, the Bobcats compiled a 7–2 record, shut out six of nine opponents, and outscored all opponents by a total of 172 to 29.

== Schedule ==
Date	Opponent	Site	Result	Attendance	Source
September 24	Rio Grande	Ohio Field; Athens, OH	W 19–0		
October 1	at Indiana	Memorial Stadium; Bloomington, IN	L 6–7		
October 8	Franklin	Ohio Field; Athens, OH	W 39–0		
October 15	at Navy	Thompson Stadium; Annapolis, MD	W 14–0		
October 22	at Miami (OH)	Oxford, OH (rivalry)	L 0–16		
October 29	Georgetown (KY)	Ohio Field; Athens, OH	W 27–0		
November 5	Wittenberg	Ohio Field; Athens, OH	W 19–6		
November 12	at Cincinnati	Nippert Stadium; Cincinnati, OH	W 23–0		
November 19	Ohio Wesleyan	Selby Field; Delaware, OH	W 25–0	5,000	
