= 1932 Cincinnati Bearcats football team =

American college football season

1932 Cincinnati Bearcats football
- Conference: Buckeye Athletic Association
- Record: 7–2 (2–2 BAA)
- Head coach: Dana M. King (2nd season)
- Captain: Bill Gilliland
- Home stadium: Nippert Stadium

1932 Buckeye Athletic Association football standings
	Conf.					Overall
Team	W		L		T	W		L		T
Miami (OH) $	5	–	0	–	0	7	–	1	–	0
Ohio	3	–	1	–	0	7	–	2	–	0
Cincinnati	2	–	2	–	0	7	–	2	–	0
Ohio Wesleyan	2	–	2	–	0	5	–	4	–	0
Wittenberg	1	–	4	–	0	3	–	6	–	0
Denison	0	–	4	–	0	2	–	6	–	0
$ – Conference champion

The 1932 Cincinnati Bearcats football team was an American football team that represented the University of Cincinnati as a member of the Buckeye Athletic Association during the 1932 college football season. In their second season under head coach Dana M. King, the Bearcats compiled a 7–2 record (2–2 against conference opponents).

== Schedule ==
Date	Opponent	Site	Result	Source
September 24	Hanover*	Nippert Stadium; Cincinnati, OH	W 51–0	
October 1	Georgetown (KY)*	Nippert Stadium; Cincinnati, OH	W 22–12	
October 8	Butler*	Nippert Stadium; Cincinnati, OH	W 13–7	
October 15	South Dakota*	Nippert Stadium; Cincinnati, OH	W 7–0	
October 22	Denison	Nippert Stadium; Cincinnati, OH	W 6–0	
October 29	Wittenberg	Nippert Stadium; Cincinnati, OH	W 25–6	
November 5	Wabash*	Nippert Stadium; Cincinnati, OH	W 14–0	
November 12	at Ohio	Peden Stadium; Athens, OH	L 0–23	
November 24	Miami (OH)	Nippert Stadium; Cincinnati, OH	L 13–21	
*Non-conference game
