= 1929 Ohio Bobcats football team =

American college football season

1929 Ohio Bobcats football

BAA champion
- Conference: Buckeye Athletic Association
- Record: 9–0 (5–0 BAA)
- Head coach: Don Peden (6th season)
- Home stadium: Ohio Field

1929 Buckeye Athletic Association football standings
	Conf.					Overall
Team	W		L		T	W		L		T
Ohio $	5	–	0	–	0	9	–	0	–	0
Ohio Wesleyan	3	–	1	–	1	6	–	2	–	1
Miami (OH)	3	–	2	–	0	7	–	2	–	0
Wittenberg	2	–	2	–	1	5	–	4	–	1
Cincinnati	0	–	4	–	1	4	–	4	–	1
Denison	0	–	4	–	1	1	–	6	–	1
$ – Conference champion

The 1929 Ohio Bobcats football team was an American football team that represented Ohio University as a member of the Buckeye Athletic Association (BAA) during the 1929 college football season. In their sixth season under head coach Don Peden, the Bobcats compiled a perfect 9–0 record, won the Buckeye Athletic Association championship, shut out seven of nine opponents, and outscored all opponents by a total of 306 to 13.

== Schedule ==
Date	Opponent	Site	Result	Attendance	Source
September 28	at Indiana	Memorial Stadium; Bloomington, IN	W 18–0		
October 5	West Liberty	Ohio Field; Athens, OH	W 26–0	3,500	
October 12	Ohio Wesleyan	Ohio Field; Athens, OH	W 21–7		
October 19	at Muskingum	New Concord, OH	W 59–0	4,000	
October 26	at Cincinnati	Carson Field; Cincinnati, OH	W 35–0	6,000	
November 2	Miami (OH)	Ohio Field; Athens, OH (rivalry)	W 14–0	10,000	
November 9	at Denison	Granville, OH	W 54–0		
November 16	at Marietta	Marietta, OH	W 46–0		
November 22	Wittenberg	Ohio Field; Athens, OH	W 33–6	6,000	
