= Dana M. King =

American football and baseball coach (1890–1952)

Biographical details
- Born: 1890
- Died: April 19, 1952 (aged 62); Glenford, Ohio, U.S.

Playing career

Football
- c. 1915: Ohio

Baseball
- c. 1915: Ohio
- Position: End (football)

Coaching career (HC unless noted)

Football
- 1917: Hamilton HS (OH)
- 1919–1929: Hamilton HS (OH)
- 1930: Cincinnati (assistant)
- 1931–1934: Cincinnati
- 1939–1941: Cincinnati Bengals
- 1943–1945: Hamilton HS (OH)

Basketball
- 1917–1929: Hamilton HS (OH)

Baseball
- 1936: Cincinnati

Administrative career (AD unless noted)
- 1932–1936: Cincinnati

Head coaching record
- Overall: 25–10–1 (college football); 5–9 (college baseball); 8–14–2 (pro football)

Accomplishments and honors

Championships
- Football; 2 Buckeye (1933–1934)

Dana M. King (1890 – April 19, 1952) was an American football and baseball coach. He served as the head football coach at the University of Cincinnati from 1931 to 1934, compiling a record of 25–10–1.

== Early life and education ==
King graduated from Ohio University in 1917. He played football for the Bobcats as an end.

== Coaching career ==
=== Hamilton High School ===
King served as football coach at Hamilton High School. He coached 16 seasons (1917, 1919–1929 and 1943–1945), going 104–26–8, with his only losing season being in 1917 (3–5–1). From 1926 to 1929, his team went 35–2–1 with a 10–0 season in 1929 in which they scored 332 points while allowing only 19. From 1928 to 1930, his team had an 18-game winning streak. His teams used single-wing and double-wing offenses for most of his career before going to a T-formation attack in his term in the 1940s. He also served time as coach for baseball, track, and basketball. For basketball, he coached from 1917 to 1929, with an 18–0 team in 1926–27 before losing in the District Tournament finals. He went 148–59 as coach. In the 1920s, he served as city recreation director, along with overseeing development of the playground system in the city. He also helped establish softball leagues and coached a local American Legion football team.

=== University of Cincinnati ===
King joined the University of Cincinnati as an assistant football coach in 1930. He became coach the next year, along with athletic director in 1932. In his four seasons as coach, he went 25–10–1, with two conference titles. He stepped down as coach in 1934, although he stayed on as athletic director until 1936.

=== Cincinnati Bengals ===
In 1939, King became coach of the original Cincinnati Bengals. They went 6–2 in 1939, good for second in the American Professional Football Association. They joined the American Football League in 1940. They went 1–7 in 1940 and 1–5–2 in 1941 before disbanding after World War II shuttled the league and the team.

=== Return to Hamilton High School ===
King returned to Hamilton High School in 1942 to serve as head football coach and athletic director. He left coaching after 1945 due to ill health.

== Later life and death ==
After the 1946–47 school year, he retired as a math teacher. He was inducted into the Butler County Sports and Hamilton School Athletic Halls of Fame. King died on April 19, 1952, at his home in Glenford, Ohio.

== Head coaching record ==
=== College football ===
Year	Team	Overall	Conference	Standing	Bowl/playoffs
Cincinnati Bearcats (Buckeye Athletic Association) (1931–1934)
1931	Cincinnati	5–4	2–1	T–3rd	
1932	Cincinnati	7–2	2–2	T–3rd	
1933	Cincinnati	7–2	3–1	T–1st	
1934	Cincinnati	6–2–1	3–0–1	1st	
Cincinnati:		25–10–1	10–4–1		
Total:		25–10–1			
National championship Conference title Conference division title or championship game berth
