= 1931 Ohio Bobcats football team =

American college football season

1931 Ohio Bobcats football

BAA champion
- Conference: Buckeye Athletic Association
- Record: 7–1 (4–0 BAA)
- Head coach: Don Peden (8th season)
- Home stadium: Ohio Field

1931 Buckeye Athletic Association football standings
	Conf.					Overall
Team	W		L		T	W		L		T
Ohio $	4	–	0	–	0	7	–	1	–	0
Wittenberg	1	–	0	–	0	8	–	0	–	1
Ohio Wesleyan	2	–	1	–	0	5	–	3	–	0
Cincinnati	2	–	1	–	0	5	–	4	–	0
Miami (OH)	1	–	4	–	0	4	–	5	–	0
Denison	0	–	4	–	0	0	–	6	–	2
$ – Conference champion

The 1931 Ohio Bobcats football team was an American football team that represented Ohio University as a member of the Buckeye Athletic Association (BAA) during the 1931 college football season. In their eighth season under head coach Don Peden, the Bobcats compiled a 7–1 record, won the BAA championship, shut out six of eight opponents, and outscored all opponents by a total of 172 to 14.

== Schedule ==
Date	Opponent	Site	Result	Attendance	Source
September 26	at Indiana*	Memorial Stadium; Bloomington, IN	L 6–7	10,000	
October 3	Butler*	Ohio Field; Athens, OH	W 40–0		
October 10	at Denison	Granville, OH	W 33–0		
October 17	Simpson*	Ohio Field; Athens, OH	W 22–0		
October 24	at Cincinnati	Nippert Stadium; Cincinnati, OH	W 13–7		
October 31	Ohio Wesleyan	Ohio Field; Athens, OH	W 18–0		
November 7	at DePauw*	Blackstock Field; Greencastle, IN	W 27–0		
November 14	Miami (OH)	Ohio Field; Athens, OH (rivalry)	W 13–0		
*Non-conference game
