= 1930 Ohio Bobcats football team =

American college football season

1930 Ohio Bobcats football

BAA champion
- Conference: Buckeye Athletic Association
- Record: 8–0–1 (4–0 BAA)
- Head coach: Don Peden (7th season)
- Home stadium: Ohio Field

1930 Buckeye Athletic Association football standings
	Conf.					Overall
Team	W		L		T	W		L		T
Ohio $	4	–	0	–	0	8	–	0	–	1
Ohio Wesleyan	3	–	1	–	0	5	–	4	–	0
Cincinnati	2	–	2	–	0	5	–	4	–	0
Miami (OH)	1	–	3	–	0	4	–	4	–	1
Denison	0	–	4	–	0	2	–	7	–	0
$ – Conference champion

The 1930 Ohio Bobcats football team was an American football team that represented Ohio University as a member of the Buckeye Athletic Association (BAA) during the 1930 college football season. In their seventh season under head coach Don Peden, the Bobcats compiled an 8–0–1 record, won the BAA championship, and outscored opponents by a total of 227 to 32. The 1930 season was the Bobcats' second consecutive undefeated season.

== Schedule ==
Date	Opponent	Site	Result
September 27	Wilmington	Athens, OH	W 27–0
October 3	at Butler	Indianapolis, IN	W 12–7
October 11	West Liberty Normal	Athens, OH	T 13–13
October 18	at Western Reserve	Cleveland, OH	W 47–0
October 25	at Miami (OH)	Oxford, OH (rivalry)	W 27–6
November 1	at Cincinnati	Cincinnati, OH	W 48–0
November 8	Denison	Athens, OH	W 36–0
November 15	Muskingum	Athens, OH	W 32–0
November 22	at Ohio Wesleyan	Delaware, OH	W 7–0
