= 1932 Miami Redskins football team =

American college football season

1932 Miami Redskins football

BAA champion
- Conference: Buckeye Athletic Association
- Record: 7–1 (5–0 BAA)
- Head coach: Frank Wilton (1st season)
- Home stadium: Miami Field

1932 Buckeye Athletic Association football standings
	Conf.					Overall
Team	W		L		T	W		L		T
Miami (OH) $	5	–	0	–	0	7	–	1	–	0
Ohio	3	–	1	–	0	7	–	2	–	0
Cincinnati	2	–	2	–	0	7	–	2	–	0
Ohio Wesleyan	2	–	2	–	0	5	–	4	–	0
Wittenberg	1	–	4	–	0	3	–	6	–	0
Denison	0	–	4	–	0	2	–	6	–	0
$ – Conference champion

The 1932 Miami Redskins football team was an American football team that represented Miami University of Oxford, Ohio, as a member of the Buckeye Athletic Association (BAA) during the 1932 college football season. In their first season under head coach Frank Wilton, the Redskins compiled a 7–1 record (5–0 in conference games), won the BAA championship, and outscored opponents by a total of 182 to 56. After losing its opening game to Illinois, the team won its remaining seven games.

== Schedule ==
Date	Opponent	Site	Result	Attendance	Source
October 1	at Illinois*	Memorial Stadium; Champaign, IL	L 7–20	4,568	
October 8	DePauw*	Miami Field; Oxford, OH	W 33–13		
October 15	at Denison	Granville, OH	W 27–7		
October 22	Ohio	Miami Field; Oxford, OH (rivalry)	W 16–0		
October 29	at Wabash	Crawfordsville, IN	W 33–0		
November 5	Ohio Wesleyan	Miami Field; Oxford, OH	W 26–3		
November 12	at Wittenberg	Springfield, OH	W 19–0		
November 24	at Cincinnati	Nippert Stadium; Cincinnati, OH (Victory Bell)	W 21–13		
*Non-conference game
