= Chester Pittser =

American sports coach (1893–1978)

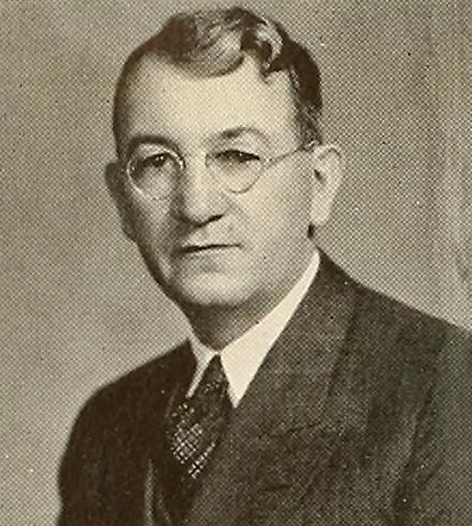

Biographical details
- Born: July 29, 1893; Gunnison, Colorado, U.S.
- Died: October 17, 1978 (aged 85); Chula Vista, California, U.S.

Coaching career (HC unless noted)

Football
- 1919: Golden HS (CO)
- 1920–1921: Montana Mines
- 1922–1923: Illinois (assistant)
- 1924–1931: Miami (OH)
- 1934–1942: Montclair State

Basketball
- 1920–1922: Montana Mines
- 1934–1944: Montclair State

Baseball
- 1925–1931: Miami (OH)
- 1935–1943: Montclair State

Head coaching record
- Overall: 82–45–5 (college football); 123–67 (college basketball); 129–67–2 (college baseball)

Accomplishments and honors

Championships
- Football; 1 OAC (1927)

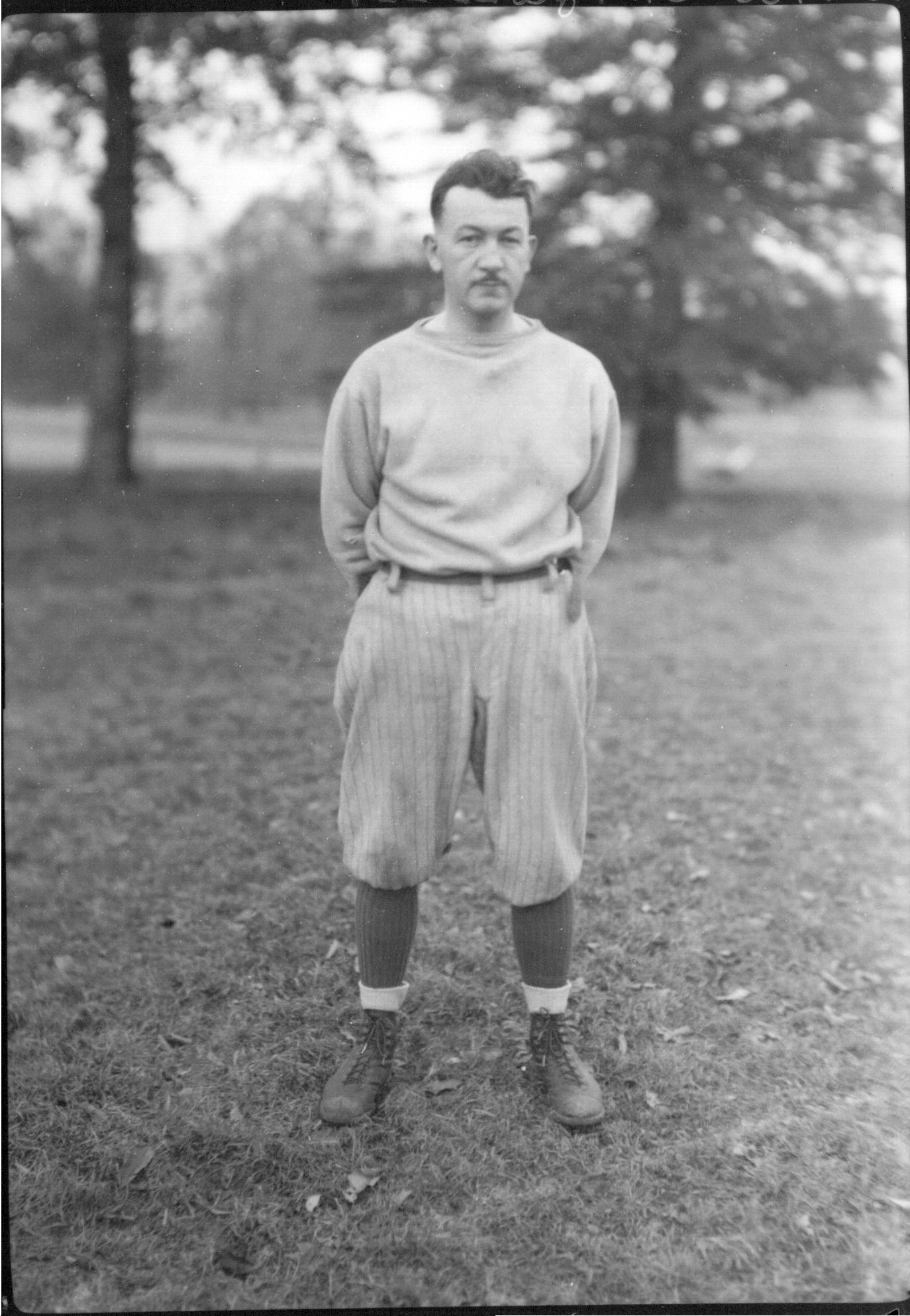
Coach Chester M. Pittser in uniform (1925)

Chester Matthias "Chet" Pittser (July 29, 1893 – October 17, 1978) was an American football, basketball, and baseball coach at the college level. He served as the head football coach at the Montana State School of Mines—now known as Montana Technological University—from 1920 to 1921, Miami University in Oxford, Ohio, from 1924 to 1931, and at Montclair State Teachers College—now known as Montclair State University—from 1934 to 1942, compiling a career college football head coaching record of 82–45–5. Pittser was also the head basketball coach at Montclair State from 1934 to 1944, tallying a mark of 123–67, and the head baseball coach at Miami (1925–1931) and Montclair State (1935–1943), amassing a career college baseball record of 129–67–2.

== Education and playing career ==
Pittser graduated from the University of Illinois in 1924 and received his master's degree from Columbia University in 1931. He was also an all-league fullback and pitcher at Colorado School of Mines. In addition to football and baseball, Pittser competed on the Colorado School of Mines basketball and track and field teams.

== Coaching career ==
=== Miami ===
Pittser served as football coach for Miami University in Oxford, Ohio, from 1924 through 1931 with a record of 41–25–2. Pittser came to Miami from Montana School of Mines where he coached football and basketball. While at Miami, he mentored future Pro Football Hall of Fame coaches, Paul Brown and Weeb Ewbank.

Pittser's was the baseball coach during this same period he was football coach. During his tenure, the baseball teams captured three Buckeye Athletic Association (BAA) titles and shared two others in compiling a record of 77–21. He has the highest winning percentage (.786) of any Miami head coach. He was inducted into the Miami Athletic Hall of Fame in 1970.

=== Montclair State ===
After leaving Miami, he coached football, basketball, and baseball at Montclair State Teachers College in Montclair, New Jersey, from 1934 to 1944. In 1934, Pittser became the fourth head football coach in school history and had a career record of 41–20–3. His best year was his first when he led Montclair to a record of 5–1. For the season, Pittser's defense only allowed 12 points with the lone loss coming to Trenton State College, 6–0. Pittser also had a 52–46–2 record as a baseball coach and is a charter member of the Montclair State College Athletic Hall of Fame.

== Death ==
Pittser died on October 17, 1978, in Chula Vista, California, at the age of 85.

== Head coaching record ==
=== College football ===
Year	Team	Overall	Conference	Standing	Bowl/playoffs
Miami Redskins (Ohio Athletic Conference) (1924–1925)
1924	Miami	2–6	1–5	7th	
1925	Miami	5–3	3–2	T–8th	
Miami Redskins (Ohio Athletic Conference / Buckeye Athletic Association) (1926–1927)
1926	Miami	5–2–1	4–2–1 / 1–2–1	T–8th / 4th	
1927	Miami	8–1	7–1 / 3–1	T–1st / 2nd	
Miami Redskins (Buckeye Athletic Association) (1928–1931)
1928	Miami	6–2	3–2	3rd	
1929	Miami	7–2	3–2	3rd	
1930	Miami	4–4–1	1–3	4th	
1931	Miami	4–5	1–4	5th	
Miami:		41–25–2	23–21–1		
Montclair State Indians (Independent) (1934–1942)
1934	Montclair State	5–1			
1935	Montclair State	5–1–1			
1936	Montclair State	4–3			
1937	Montclair State	5–2–1			
1938	Montclair State	4–2–1			
1939	Montclair State	5–2			
1940	Montclair State	6–3			
1941	Montclair State	5–4			
1942	Montclair State	2–2			
Montclair State:		41–20–3			
Total:		82–45–5			
