= 1929 Cincinnati Bearcats football team =

American college football season

1929 Cincinnati Bearcats football
- Conference: Buckeye Athletic Association
- Record: 4–4–1 (0–4–1 BAA)
- Head coach: George Babcock (3rd season)
- Captain: Frank Dost
- Home stadium: Nippert Stadium

1929 Buckeye Athletic Association football standings
	Conf.					Overall
Team	W		L		T	W		L		T
Ohio $	5	–	0	–	0	9	–	0	–	0
Ohio Wesleyan	3	–	1	–	1	6	–	2	–	1
Miami (OH)	3	–	2	–	0	7	–	2	–	0
Wittenberg	2	–	2	–	1	5	–	4	–	1
Cincinnati	0	–	4	–	1	4	–	4	–	1
Denison	0	–	4	–	1	1	–	6	–	1
$ – Conference champion

The 1929 Cincinnati Bearcats football team was an American football team that represented the University of Cincinnati as a member of the Buckeye Athletic Association during the 1929 college football season. In their third season under head coach George Babcock, the Bearcats compiled a 4–4–1 record.

== Schedule ==
Date	Opponent	Site	Result
September 28	Cedarville*	Nippert Stadium; Cincinnati, OH	W 19–0
October 2	at Louisville*	Louisville, KY (rivalry)	W 7–0
October 5	Ohio Northern*	Nippert Stadium; Cincinnati, OH	W 12–6
October 12	at Kenyon*	Gambier, OH	W 18–6
October 19	Denison	Nippert Stadium; Cincinnati, OH	T 6–6
October 26	Ohio	Nippert Stadium; Cincinnati, OH	L 0–35
November 2	at Wittenberg	Springfield, OH	L 7–13
November 16	Ohio Wesleyan	Nippert Stadium; Cincinnati, OH	L 0–53
November 28	Miami (OH)	Nippert Stadium; Cincinnati, OH (Victory Bell)	L 6–14
*Non-conference game
