= 1928 Miami Redskins football team =

American college football season

1928 Miami Redskins football
- Conference: Buckeye Athletic Association
- Record: 6–2 (3–2 BAA)
- Head coach: Chester Pittser (5th season)
- Home stadium: Miami Field

1928 Buckeye Athletic Association football standings
| | Conf. | | | | | Overall |
| Team | W | | L | | T | W | | L | | T |
|---|---|---|---|---|---|---|---|---|---|---|
| Ohio Wesleyan + | 4 | – | 1 | – | 0 | 8 | – | 1 | – | 0 |
| Wittenberg + | 4 | – | 1 | – | 0 | 6 | – | 3 | – | 0 |
| Miami (OH) | 3 | – | 2 | – | 0 | 6 | – | 2 | – | 0 |
| Ohio | 2 | – | 3 | – | 0 | 6 | – | 3 | – | 0 |
| Denison | 2 | – | 3 | – | 0 | 5 | – | 3 | – | 0 |
| Cincinnati | 0 | – | 5 | – | 0 | 1 | – | 8 | – | 0 |
+ – Conference co-champions

The 1928 Miami Redskins football team was an American football team that represented Miami University as a member of the Buckeye Athletic Association (BAA) during the 1928 college football season. In its fifth season under head coach Chester Pittser, Miami compiled a 6–2 record (3–2 against conference opponents) and finished in third place out of six teams in the BAA.

== Schedule ==
| Date | Opponent | Site | Result | Source |
|---|---|---|---|---|
| September 29 | Defiance* | Miami Field; Oxford, OH | W 42–0 | |
| October 6 | Transylvania* | Miami Field; Oxford, OH | W 8–0 | |
| October 13 | at Denison | Granville, OH | L 0–21 | |
| October 20 | Ohio Wesleyan | Miami Field; Oxford, OH | L 0–12 | |
| November 3 | Ohio | Ohio Field; Athens, OH (rivalry) | W 20–13 | |
| November 10 | at Oberlin* | Oberlin, OH | W 18–0 | |
| November 17 | at Wittenberg | Springfield, OH | W 18–0 | |
| November 29 | at Cincinnati | Nippert Stadium; Cincinnati, OH (Victory Bell) | W 34–0 | |
*Non-conference game
