= 1928 Ohio Bobcats football team =

American college football season

1928 Ohio Bobcats football
- Conference: Buckeye Athletic Association
- Record: 6–3 (2–3 BAA)
- Head coach: Don Peden (5th season)

1928 Buckeye Athletic Association football standings
	Conf.					Overall
Team	W		L		T	W		L		T
Ohio Wesleyan +	4	–	1	–	0	8	–	1	–	0
Wittenberg +	4	–	1	–	0	6	–	3	–	0
Miami (OH)	3	–	2	–	0	6	–	2	–	0
Ohio	2	–	3	–	0	6	–	3	–	0
Denison	2	–	3	–	0	5	–	3	–	0
Cincinnati	0	–	5	–	0	1	–	8	–	0
+ – Conference co-champions

The 1928 Ohio Bobcats football team was an American football team that represented Ohio University in the Buckeye Athletic Association (BAA) during the 1928 college football season. In their fifth season under head coach Don Peden, the Bobcats compiled a 6–3 record and outscored opponents by a total of 256 to 72.

== Schedule ==
Date	Opponent	Site	Result	Source
September 29	Rio Grande*	Athens, OH	W 45–7	
October 6	West Liberty*	Athens, OH	W 14–6	
October 13	Wittenberg	Springfield, OH	L 12–13	
October 20	Cincinnati	Athens, OH	W 66–6	
October 27	at Ohio Northern*	Ada, OH	W 39–0	
November 3	at Miami (OH)	Ohio Field; Oxford, OH (rivalry)	L 13–20	
November 10	Marietta*	Athens, OH	W 40–0	
November 17	at Ohio Wesleyan	Delaware, OH	L 0–7	
November 24	Denison	Athens, OH	W 27–13	
*Non-conference game
