= 1930 Miami Redskins football team =

American college football season

1930 Miami Redskins football
- Conference: Buckeye Athletic Association
- Record: 4–4–1 (1–3 BAA)
- Head coach: Chester Pittser (7th season)
- Home stadium: Miami Field

1930 Buckeye Athletic Association football standings
	Conf.					Overall
Team	W		L		T	W		L		T
Ohio $	4	–	0	–	0	8	–	0	–	1
Ohio Wesleyan	3	–	1	–	0	5	–	4	–	0
Cincinnati	2	–	2	–	0	5	–	4	–	0
Miami (OH)	1	–	3	–	0	4	–	4	–	1
Denison	0	–	4	–	0	2	–	7	–	0
$ – Conference champion

The 1930 Miami Redskins football team was an American football team that represented Miami University as a member of the Buckeye Athletic Association (BAA) during the 1930 college football season. In its seventh season under head coach Chester Pittser, Miami compiled a 4–4–1 record (1–3 against conference opponents) and finished in fourth place out of five teams in the BAA.

== Schedule ==
Date	Opponent	Site	Result	Source
September 27	at Indiana*	Memorial Stadium; Bloomington, IN	L 0–14	
October 4	Illinois "B"*	Miami Field; Oxford, OH	T 6–6	
October 11	Kentucky Wesleyan*	Miami Field; Oxford, OH	W 20–0	
October 18	at Denison	Granville, OH	W 19–6	
October 25	Ohio	Miami Field; Oxford, OH (rivalry)	L 6–27	
November 1	Ashland*	Miami Field; Oxford, OH	W 48–0	
November 8	Ohio Wesleyan	Miami Field; Oxford, OH	L 20–23	
November 15	at Oberlin*	Oberlin, OH	W 12–0	
November 27	at Cincinnati	Nippert Stadium; Cincinnati, OH (Victory Bell)	L 0–6	
*Non-conference game
