= 1930 Cincinnati Bearcats football team =

American college football season

1930 Cincinnati Bearcats football
- Conference: Buckeye Athletic Association
- Record: 5–4 (2–2 BAA)
- Head coach: George Babcock (4th season)
- Captain: Art Hallett
- Home stadium: Nippert Stadium

1930 Buckeye Athletic Association football standings
	Conf.					Overall
Team	W		L		T	W		L		T
Ohio $	4	–	0	–	0	8	–	0	–	1
Ohio Wesleyan	3	–	1	–	0	5	–	4	–	0
Cincinnati	2	–	2	–	0	5	–	4	–	0
Miami (OH)	1	–	3	–	0	4	–	4	–	1
Denison	0	–	4	–	0	2	–	7	–	0
$ – Conference champion

The 1930 Cincinnati Bearcats football team was an American football team that represented the University of Cincinnati as a member of the Buckeye Athletic Association during the 1930 college football season. In their fourth and final season under head coach George Babcock, the Bearcats compiled a 5–4 record.

== Schedule ==
Date	Opponent	Site	Result	Source
September 27	Cedarville*	Nippert Stadium; Cincinnati, OH	W 46–0	
October 3	Kentucky Wesleyan*	Nippert Stadium; Cincinnati, OH	W 6–0	
October 11	at Michigan State*	College Field; East Lansing, MI	L 0–32	
October 18	Ohio Wesleyan	Nippert Stadium; Cincinnati, OH	L 0–33	
October 25	Denison	Nippert Stadium; Cincinnati, OH	W 13–6	
November 1	Ohio	Nippert Stadium; Cincinnati, OH	L 0–48	
November 8	Marietta*	Nippert Stadium; Cincinnati, OH	W 20–7	
November 15	Wittenberg*	Nippert Stadium; Cincinnati, OH	L 0–12	
November 27	Miami (OH)	Nippert Stadium; Cincinnati, OH (Victory Bell)	W 6–0	
*Non-conference game
