= 1931 Miami Redskins football team =

American college football season

1931 Miami Redskins football
- Conference: Buckeye Athletic Association
- Record: 4–5 (1–4 BAA)
- Head coach: Chester Pittser (8th season)
- Home stadium: Miami Field

1931 Buckeye Athletic Association football standings
	Conf.					Overall
Team	W		L		T	W		L		T
Ohio $	4	–	0	–	0	7	–	1	–	0
Wittenberg	1	–	0	–	0	8	–	0	–	1
Ohio Wesleyan	2	–	1	–	0	5	–	3	–	0
Cincinnati	2	–	1	–	0	5	–	4	–	0
Miami (OH)	1	–	4	–	0	4	–	5	–	0
Denison	0	–	4	–	0	0	–	6	–	2
$ – Conference champion

The 1931 Miami Redskins football team was an American football team that represented Miami University as a member of the Buckeye Athletic Association (BAA) during the 1931 college football season. In its eighth and final season under head coach Chester Pittser, Miami compiled a 4–5 record (1–4 against conference opponents) and finished in fifth place out of six teams in the BAA.

== Schedule ==
Date	Opponent	Site	Result	Attendance	Source
September 26	at Pittsburgh*	Pitt Stadium; Pittsburgh, PA	L 0–61	12,000	
October 3	Ball State*	Miami Field; Oxford, OH	W 47–0		
October 10	Wabash*	Miami Field; Oxford, OH	W 37–0		
October 17	Georgetown (KY)*	Miami Field; Oxford, OH	W 45–0		
October 24	at Ohio Wesleyan	Delaware, OH	L 7–12		
October 31	Denison	Miami Field; Oxford, OH	W 19–0		
November 7	Wittenberg	Miami Field; Oxford, OH	L 6–10		
November 14	at Ohio	Ohio Field; Athens, OH (rivalry)	L 0–13		
November 21	at Cincinnati*	Nippert Stadium; Cincinnati, OH (Victory Bell)	L 0–20		
*Non-conference game
