= Don Peden =

American football player and coach, baseball coach, college athletics administrator

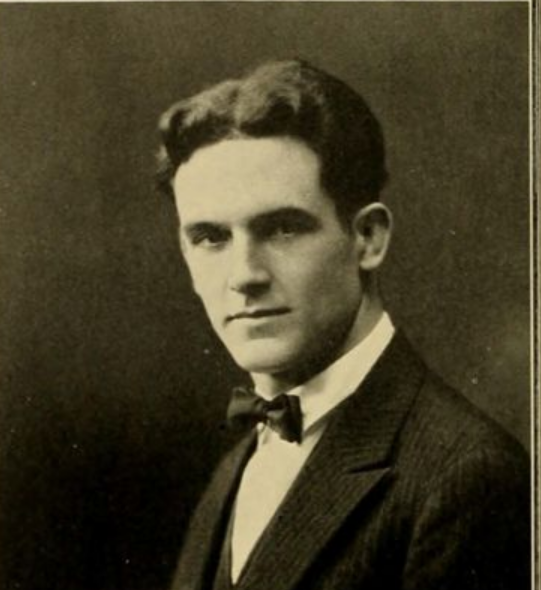
- Peden from 1925 Athena

Biographical details
- Born: December 30, 1898; Kewanee, Illinois, U.S.
- Died: February 23, 1970 (aged 71); San Diego, California, U.S.

Playing career

Football
- 1920–1921: Illinois

Baseball
- 1921–1922: Illinois
- Position: Halfback (football)

Coaching career (HC unless noted)

Football
- 1923: Ohio (assistant)
- 1924–1946: Ohio

Baseball
- 1924–1948: Ohio

Administrative career (AD unless noted)
- 1938–1949: Ohio
- 1950: Cincinnati Reds (scout)

Head coaching record
- Overall: 121–46–11 (football); 250–134 (baseball)

Accomplishments and honors

Championships
- Football; 6 Buckeye (1929–1931, 1935–1936, 1938)

Don C. Peden (December 30, 1898 – February 23, 1970) was an American football and baseball player and coach. He served as the head football coach at Ohio University from 1924 to 1946, compiling a record of 121 wins, 46 losses and 11 draws Peden's winning percentage of (.711) is the highest of any coach in the history of the Ohio Bobcats football program. His teams won six Buckeye Athletic Association championships, in 1929, 1930, 1931, 1935, 1936, and 1938.

Peden grew up in Kewanee, Illinois and attended the University of Illinois. In college he played football as a halfback and baseball, basketball and track.

Peden was also the head baseball coach at Ohio from 1924 to 1948, tallying a mark of 250–134 and served as the university's Athletic Director from 1938 to 1949.

The Bobcats' football stadium was renamed in his honor as Peden Stadium following his retirement. Peden died at the age of 71 on February 23, 1970, in San Diego, California.

== Head coaching record ==
=== Football ===
Year	Team	Overall	Conference	Standing	Bowl/playoffs
Ohio Green and White / Bobcats (Ohio Athletic Conference) (1924–1925)
1924	Ohio	4–4	2–4	14th	
1925	Ohio	6–2	3–2	T–8th	
Ohio Bobcats (Ohio Athletic Conference / Buckeye Athletic Association) (1926–1927)
1926	Ohio	5–2–1	4–2–1 / 2–1–1	T–8th / 3rd	
1927	Ohio	4–2–2	3–1–2 / 1–1–2	T–7th / 4th	
Ohio Bobcats (Buckeye Athletic Association) (1928–1938)
1928	Ohio	6–3	2–3	T–4th	
1929	Ohio	9–0	5–0	1st	
1930	Ohio	8–0–1	4–0	1st	
1931	Ohio	7–1	4–0	1st	
1932	Ohio	7–2	3–1	2nd	
1933	Ohio	6–2–1	3–1–1	3rd	
1934	Ohio	4–4–1	1–2–1	4th	
1935	Ohio	8–0	5–0	1st	
1936	Ohio	5–2–1	3–1–1	T–1st	
1937	Ohio	5–3–1	3–1–1	3rd	
1938	Ohio	7–2	3–1	T–1st	
Ohio Bobcats (Independent) (1939–1945)
1939	Ohio	6–3			
1940	Ohio	5–2–2			
1941	Ohio	5–2–1			
1942	Ohio	5–3			
1943	No team—World War II				
1944	No team—World War II				
1945	Ohio	3–4			
Ohio Bobcats (Mid American Conference) (1946)
1946	Ohio	6–3	0–1	T–3rd	
Ohio:		121–46–11	48–20–7		
Total:		121–46–11			
National championship Conference title Conference division title or championship game berth
