= 1931 Cincinnati Bearcats football team =

American college football season

1931 Cincinnati Bearcats football
- Conference: Buckeye Athletic Association
- Record: 5–4 (2–1 BAA)
- Head coach: Dana M. King (1st season)
- Captain: Cliff Goldmeyer
- Home stadium: Nippert Stadium

1931 Buckeye Athletic Association football standings
	Conf.					Overall
Team	W		L		T	W		L		T
Ohio $	4	–	0	–	0	7	–	1	–	0
Wittenberg	1	–	0	–	0	8	–	0	–	1
Ohio Wesleyan	2	–	1	–	0	5	–	3	–	0
Cincinnati	2	–	1	–	0	5	–	4	–	0
Miami (OH)	1	–	4	–	0	4	–	5	–	0
Denison	0	–	4	–	0	0	–	6	–	2
$ – Conference champion

The 1931 Cincinnati Bearcats football team was an American football team that represented the University of Cincinnati as a member of the Buckeye Athletic Association during the 1931 college football season. In their first season under head coach Dana M. King, the Bearcats compiled a 5–4 record (2–1 against conference opponents).

== Schedule ==
Date	Opponent	Site	Result	Attendance	Source
September 26	Rio Grande (OH)*	Nippert Stadium; Cincinnati, OH	W 19–6		
October 3	at Ohio State*	Ohio Stadium; Columbus, OH	L 6–67	15,699	
October 10	DePauw*	Nippert Stadium; Cincinnati, OH	L 6–7		
October 17	Marietta*	Nippert Stadium; Cincinnati, OH	W 50–0		
October 24	Ohio	Nippert Stadium; Cincinnati, OH	L 7–13		
October 31	Muskingum*	Carson Field; Cincinnati, OH	L 0–15		
November 7	at Denison	Granville, OH	W 33–0		
November 14	Heidelberg*	Nippert Stadium; Cincinnati, OH	W 46–7		
November 26	Miami (OH)	Nippert Stadium; Cincinnati, OH (Victory Bell)	W 20–0		
*Non-conference game
