= 1929 Miami Redskins football team =

American college football season

1929 Miami Redskins football
- Conference: Buckeye Athletic Association
- Record: 7–2 (3–2 BAA)
- Head coach: Chester Pittser (6th season)
- Home stadium: Miami Field

1929 Buckeye Athletic Association football standings
	Conf.					Overall
Team	W		L		T	W		L		T
Ohio $	5	–	0	–	0	9	–	0	–	0
Ohio Wesleyan	3	–	1	–	1	6	–	2	–	1
Miami (OH)	3	–	2	–	0	7	–	2	–	0
Wittenberg	2	–	2	–	1	5	–	4	–	1
Cincinnati	0	–	4	–	1	4	–	4	–	1
Denison	0	–	4	–	1	1	–	6	–	1
$ – Conference champion

The 1929 Miami Redskins football team was an American football team that represented Miami University as a member of the Buckeye Athletic Association (BAA) during the 1929 college football season. In its sixth season under head coach Chester Pittser, Miami compiled a 7–2 record (3–2 against conference opponents) and finished in third place out of six teams in the BAA.

== Schedule ==
Date	Opponent	Site	Result
September 28	Earlham*	Miami Field; Oxford, OH	W 57–0
October 5	at Western Reserve	Cleveland, OH	W 18–0
October 12	Kentucky Wesleyan*	Miami Field; Oxford, OH	W 24–0
October 19	at Ohio Wesleyan	Delaware, OH	L 12–20
October 26	Wittenberg	Miami Field; Oxford, OH	W 3–0
November 2	at Ohio	Ohio Field; Athens, OH (rivalry)	L 0–14
November 9	Oberlin*	Miami Field; Oxford, OH	W 20–0
November 16	Denison	Miami Field; Oxford, OH	W 31–0
November 28	at Cincinnati	Nippert Stadium; Cincinnati, OH (Victory Bell)	W 14–6
*Non-conference game
