= 1928 Cincinnati Bearcats football team =

American college football season

1928 Cincinnati Bearcats football
- Conference: Buckeye Athletic Association
- Record: 1–8 (0–5 BAA)
- Head coach: George Babcock (2nd season)
- Captain: John Schott
- Home stadium: Nippert Stadium

1928 Buckeye Athletic Association football standings
	Conf.					Overall
Team	W		L		T	W		L		T
Ohio Wesleyan +	4	–	1	–	0	8	–	1	–	0
Wittenberg +	4	–	1	–	0	6	–	3	–	0
Miami (OH)	3	–	2	–	0	6	–	2	–	0
Ohio	2	–	3	–	0	6	–	3	–	0
Denison	2	–	3	–	0	5	–	3	–	0
Cincinnati	0	–	5	–	0	1	–	8	–	0
+ – Conference co-champions

The 1928 Cincinnati Bearcats football team was an American football team that represented the University of Cincinnati as a member of the Buckeye Athletic Association during the 1928 college football season. In their second season under head coach George Babcock, the Bearcats compiled a 1–8 record.

== Schedule ==
Date	Opponent	Site	Result	Source
September 29	Hanover*	Nippert Stadium; Cincinnati, OH	W 20–6	
October 6	Kentucky Wesleyan*	Nippert Stadium; Cincinnati, OH	L 0–6	
October 13	Ohio Wesleyan	Nippert Stadium; Cincinnati, OH	L 0–71	
October 20	at Ohio	Athens, OH	L 0–65	
October 27	Wittenberg	Nippert Stadium; Cincinnati, OH	L 0–6	
November 3	Transylvania*	Nippert Stadium; Cincinnati, OH	L 7–25	
November 10	Dayton*	Nippert Stadium; Cincinnati, OH	L 6–25	
November 17	Denison	Nippert Stadium; Cincinnati, OH	L 0–9	
November 29	Miami (OH)	Nippert Stadium; Cincinnati, OH (Victory Bell)	L 0–34	
*Non-conference game
