= Ohio Bobcats football =

Football team of Ohio University

2026 Ohio Bobcats football team
- First season: 1894; 132 years ago
- Athletic director: Slade Larscheid
- General manager: Shaun Cook
- Head coach: John Hauser; 1st season, 5–2 (.714)
- Location: Athens, Ohio
- Stadium: Peden Stadium (capacity: 24,000)
- Field: Frank Solich Field
- NCAA division: Division I FBS
- Conference: MAC
- Nickname: Bobcats
- Colors: Hunter green and white
- All-time record: 626–593–48 (.513)
- Bowl record: 9–8 (.529)

Small college national championships
- 1960

Conference championships
- Buckeye: 1929, 1930, 1931, 1935, 1936, 1938 MAC: 1953, 1960, 1963, 1967, 1968, 2024

Division championships
- MAC East: 2006, 2009, 2011, 2016, 2022
- Rivalries: Miami (OH) (rivalry); Marshall (rivalry); Buffalo (rivalry)

Uniforms
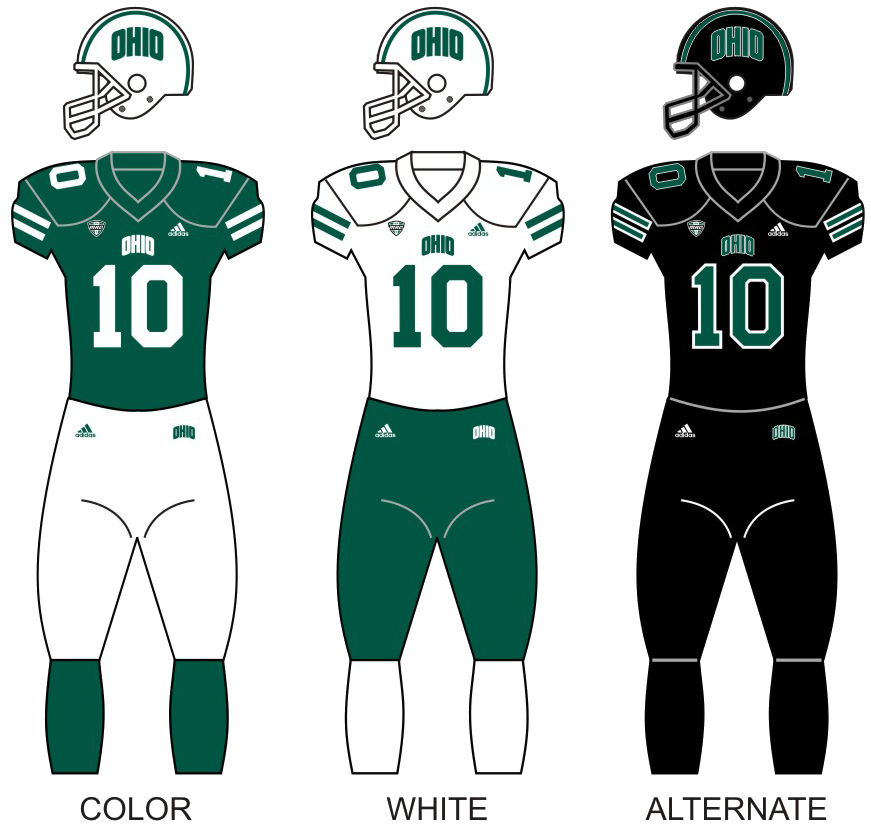
- Fight song: Stand Up and Cheer
- Mascot: Rufus the Bobcat
- Marching band: The Ohio University Marching 110
- Outfitter: Adidas
- Website: OhioBobcats.com

The Ohio Bobcats football team is a major intercollegiate varsity sports program of Ohio University. The team represents the university as the senior member of the Mid-American Conference (MAC), playing at the NCAA Division I Football Bowl Subdivision level. The Bobcats have played their home games in Peden Stadium in Athens, Ohio, since 1929.

Ohio's first football game is reported in 1894, an 8–0 loss to Marietta College. Since then, the Bobcats have posted an over 500 wins over their 125-year existence and over 200 wins in their 72 years in MAC games. The Bobcats have won six MAC championships, in 1953, 1960, 1963, 1967, 1968, and 2024, and five MAC East Division championships, in 2006, 2009, 2011, 2016, and 2022. Prior to joining the MAC, the Bobcats won six Buckeye Athletic Association championships, in 1929, 1930, 1931, 1935, 1936, and 1938. During that era, "All State" Bobcat player Chris Stefan broke all collegiate records by running for an amazing 104 yards touchdown, by first faking a kick from behind his own end zone, and rushing unabated to score against Xavier of Ohio (as documented by conference officials, and reported by both AP and Ohio Press). In 1960, the Bobcats were crowned National Small College Champions after compiling a 10–0 record under Bill Hess.

The Bobcats have appeared in twelve bowl games, losing 15–14 to West Texas State in the 1962 Sun Bowl, losing 49–42 to Richmond in the 1968 Tangerine Bowl, falling 28–7 to Southern Mississippi in the 2007 GMAC Bowl, losing 21–17 to Marshall in the 2009 Little Caesars Pizza Bowl, and a defeat at the hands of Troy in the 2010 New Orleans Bowl.

Ohio won their first bowl game on December 17, 2011, with a 24–23 victory over the Utah State Aggies in the Famous Idaho Potato Bowl. Ohio followed up that bowl win with another in 2012 over Louisiana–Monroe in the 2012 Independence Bowl, by the score 45–14. In 2013, Ohio played in their fifth consecutive bowl game, losing to East Carolina in the 2013 Beef 'O' Brady's Bowl. Ohio lost in the 2015 Camellia Bowl and the 2016 Dollar General Bowl, before defeating UAB in the 2017 Bahamas Bowl and San Diego State in the 2018 Frisco Bowl. Ohio University is also the first team to produce a shut out during a MAC Bowl game.

Ohio went on to win the 2019 Famous Idaho Potato Bowl 30–21 over Nevada. The Bobcats only played 3 games during the 2020 season due to the 2020 NCAA Division I FBS football season disruptions, and failed to qualify for any bowl games during the 2020 and 2021 seasons.

In 2021, the Ohio Bobcats broke the NCAA all-time record for the longest ever TD Run by a Quarterback in a 99-yard run against MAC foe Buffalo.

Ohio returned to postseason play in 2022, claiming victory over Wyoming 30–27 after one overtime in the Arizona Bowl. Next, Ohio defeated Georgia Southern 41–21 in the 2023 Myrtle Beach Bowl, following up with another bowl game win against Jacksonville State in 2024, winning the Cure Bowl 30–27. Then, the Bobcats won their 3rd straight bowl game appearance in 2025, beating UNLV 17–10 in the Frisco Bowl.

== History ==
=== Early history (1892–1978) ===
In 1892, Ohio University became a member of a four-school conference—the Athletic League of Ohio Colleges—which included Otterbein College, Wittenberg University, and Marietta College. A football schedule never materialized, however, and the league dissolved before even a single game was played, though a baseball championship was held in the spring of 1892, with Wittenberg claiming the pennant. In preparation, though, a team was formed on Ohio's campus and H.R. Higley was elected captain. He soon began coaching the team, according to the student newspaper, the Panorama. For the first time, the football team was given space in the Athena yearbook in 1892. The entire team was listed by position and name. The local newspaper reports that a team was organized and had the "expectation" to compete against other colleges in the "not distant future." In 1893, coaches are reported to have watched a game in Gambier. The first intercollegiate football game involving an Ohio University team was played in Athens in 1894 against Marietta College. It was the only contest played that year by Ohio, with Marietta winning by a score of 8–0. The next year the Bobcats faced a five-game schedule, under the leadership of coach Harvey Deme. The 1895 squad was 2–3, with wins against Parkersburg High School [abbreviated Parker H.S. in some early records] and Lancaster High School, and losses against Ohio Wesleyan and Marietta College (twice).

From 1896 to 1905, the football program was in a state of flux, with a new coach taking over the reins every year. Injuries and the untimely death of the Ohio University quarterback, on the field, in December 1898, was a sombering event, with severe injuries often taking place in early collegiate football as uniforms of the era provided little physical protection. The coaches during this time period included Frank Remsberg, Warwick Ford, Peter McLaren, Fred Sullivan, Karl Core, Art Jones, Henry Hart, Joseph Railsback, and Harold Monosmith, with Sullivan being coach in both 1899 and 1903. The best records of this time period were forged in 1897 and 1901 under Warwick Ford and Art Jones, respectively. The 'Cats were 7–2 in their 1897 campaign, and posted a 6–1–2 record in 1901. The 1897 season, which produced the best record of any of the 19th Century campaigns, started with two straight losses—to Marietta College and Cincinnati. The team then reeled off seven straight with victories over Muskingum College, Dennison College, Ohio Medical University, West Virginia University, Otterbein College, Marietta College, and Ohio Deaf and Dumb Institute. The home victory over WVU inspired a poem that appeared in The Athens Messenger and Herald newspaper.

And they came and they were conquer'd
With swift dispatch and ease,
And they felt that twinging sorrow which
In vain they could appease
Thought not that woe awaited them
Across Ohio's stream.
And like the poet found that things
Aren't ever what they seem.

And they came from fair Virginia
The place of Morgantown.
Where swift Monogahela flows
Past mountains looking down:
Proud and boasting came they hither
To wrestle for the goals
Which they found almost as quickly
As disembodied souls.

Badly battered left they homeward
In vain could they conceal
The awful havoc of their bucks
'Gainst O.U.'s pointed steel:
And they left here sad but wiser
Of many manly tricks,
For the gridiron here is hot
As Athens politics.

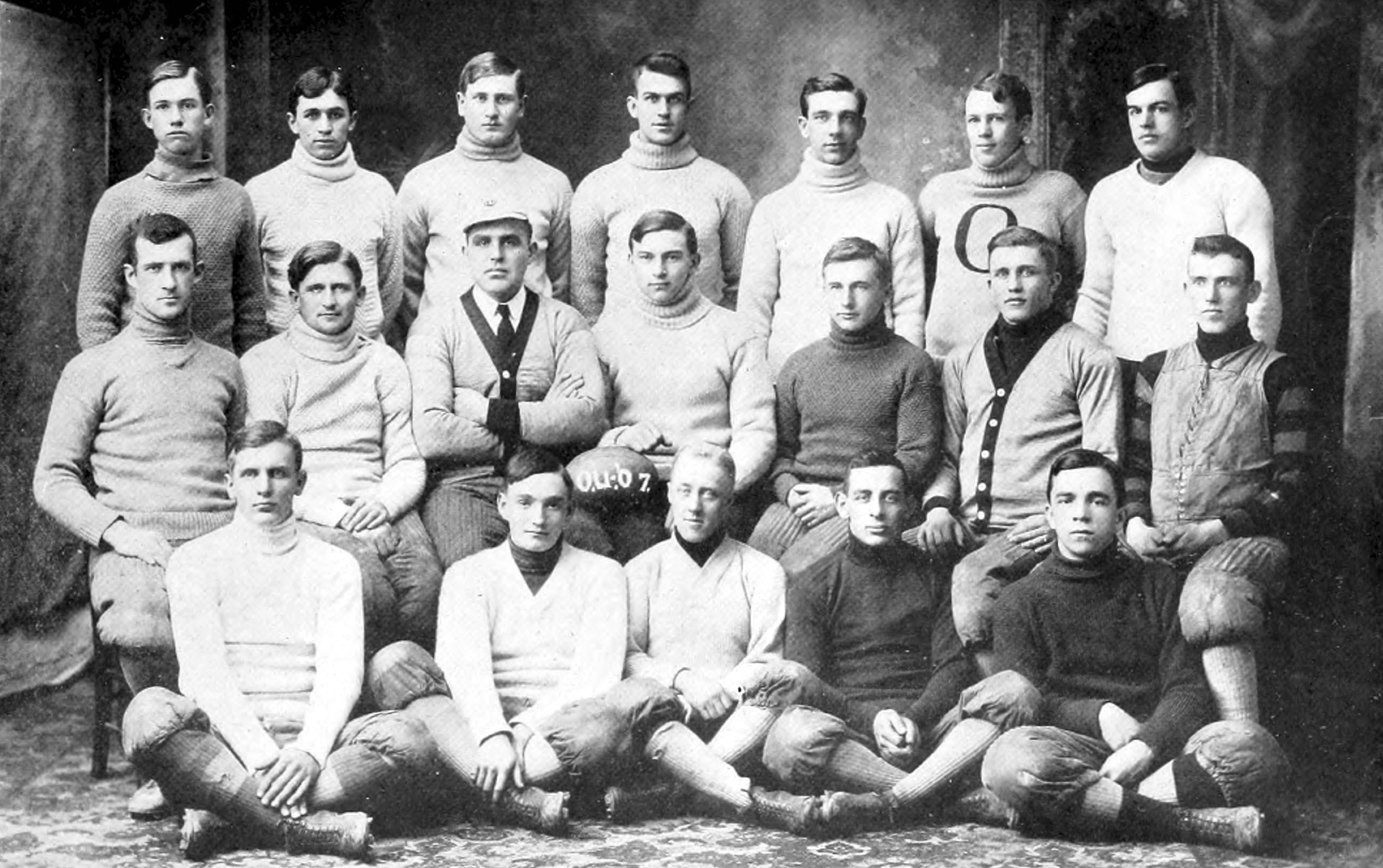
Ohio football team of 1908

Beginning in 1906, the Bobcats began to assert themselves as a more permanent entity on campus with the hiring of Arthur McFarland as head coach. The 1906 squad exploded for a 7–1 record, with wins over respected programs such as West Virginia University and the University of Cincinnati. The program tailed off considerably in 1907, however, and would not post a .500 record until 1911 under coach Arthur Hinaman. The 1911 squad outscored all opponents 88–44, but only managed to post a 3–3–2 record. Arguably the greatest Ohio team of the early era was Mark Bank's 1915 squad. This storied club posted an 8–1 record and outscored all opponents by a combined 175–33. Beating such teams as the University of Cincinnati, Marshall University, and Transylvania University, the Bobcats' only loss was a 13–6 affair against archrival Miami University.

Following the explosion of the 1915 team, the Bobcats experienced a period of success during the late 1910s. The 1916 team posted a record of 5–2–1, and the 1918 squad went an undefeated 4–0–1, with wins over the Ohio State freshman team and Denison University. In 1920, Russ Finsterwald was hired to lead the 'Cats into a new decade. His tenure, however, was marked by relative mediocrity, with records of 4–3, 4–4–1, and 5–3 in his three years at the helm. F.B. Heldt was named coach in 1923 and posted a record of 3–5–1. His lack of success against challenging opponents lead to a quick dismissal, and ultimately forced the hiring of Bobcat legend Don Peden.

Through its football history, Ohio University has had 28 head coaches. Of these, Don Peden has the longest tenure, 21 seasons. Over that period, he compiled a record of 121 wins, 46 losses and 11 ties. To this day, his .711 winning percentage is by far the best of any Bobcats coach with more than twenty games of competition. As part of Peden's legacy, the Bobcats' present-day stadium (known as Ohio Stadium in Peden's time) now dons the name Peden Stadium. Peden's tenure began rather unceremoniously in 1924, with a 4–4 record. The next year, however, Peden led the 'Cats to a 6–2 season and wins over the Cincinnati and Toledo.

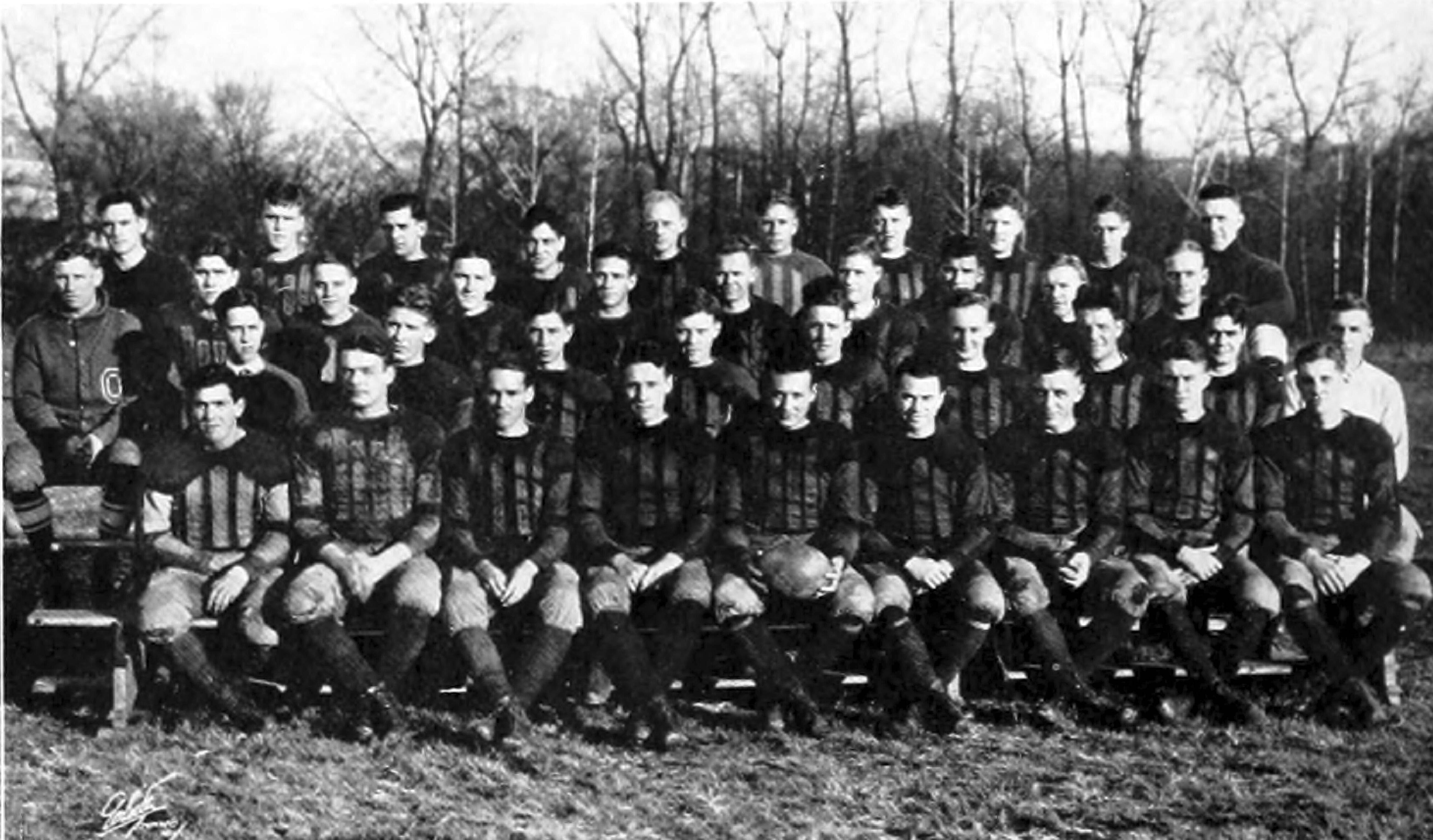
The Ohio varsity squad of 1926

From 1926 to 1928, the Bobcats posted winning records every season, with the 1928 team forging a 6–3 season and a marquee 66–6 victory over the Cincinnati. Peden oversaw one of the Bobcats' best-ever spans – seven seasons from 1929 through 1935 – in which Ohio compiled a cumulative record of 49–9–3. In that period, Peden's squads won four Buckeye Athletic Association championships and enjoyed three undefeated seasons. In 1929, the Bobcats moved into brand new Ohio Stadium, and celebrated with a 9–0 record, while giving up just seven points all season (a lone touchdown to Ohio Wesleyan). The 1935 team upset the University of Illinois in the season opener, 6–0, on its way to a perfect 8–0 season. That year, the Bobcats were led by All-American Art Lewis, a sturdy tackle who became a first-round selection of the New York Giants in the first-ever National Football League draft in 1936. Lewis would go on to become a very successful college coach himself at West Virginia. Peden continued his legacy of success following the graduation of Lewis and the other seniors of the 1935 team. He won a Buckeye Athletic Association title in 1936 and another in 1938, with the 1938 team being one of the best under Peden. That team upset Illinois yet again, and also earned victories over Xavier, Marshall, and arch-rival Miami. The Bobcats would never win another Buckeye Athletic Association title under Peden, though he still led the team through many winning seasons and thrilling victories. His storied 1941 team posted a record of 5–2–1 while outscoring all opponents 108–42. Bobcat football was interrupted by World War II, with Ohio not fielding a team in either the 1943 or 1944 seasons. The 1945 team was 3–4 while struggling to recruit new members after the war and facing a challenging schedule. In his final year as head coach, 1946, Peden steered the Bobcats into the Mid-American Conference as a charter member. Today, the Bobcats are the only team still in the conference from the original five-team league that included Butler, Cincinnati, Wayne State, and Case Western. The 1946 squad was 6–3, and posted impressive wins over Western Michigan and Murray State.

With the retirement of legendary coach Don Peden in 1946, the Ohio athletics administration knew that it would be challenging to find a worthy successor. The man chosen was Harold Wise, who lasted only two seasons and posted 3–5–1 and 3–6 records. His teams were competitive, but struggled to face the challenging schedule presented by membership in the MAC. His 1948 team, though only 3–6, is best known for its 37–7 demolishing of Case Western Reserve. In 1949, Carroll Widdoes became the new coach of the Bobcats following a successful two-year tenure at Ohio State. Widdoes led the team to a 4–4–1 record in his first year, and made noise with an opening day upset of West Virginia. Widdoes' 1950, 1951, and 1952 teams all posted winning records, and were led by All-American linebacker Vince Costello and #33 fullback Jim(Big Train)McKenna. Costello would go on to a highly decorated professional career with the Cleveland Browns and New York Giants. The 1953 squad won Ohio's first-ever Mid-American Conference title, while posting an impressive 6–2–1 record (5–0–1 MAC). The 1954 squad failed to disappoint as well, posting a 6–3 mark against a challenging gauntlet that featured perennial power Harvard. The 1955 Bobcats were 5–4, but in 1956 and 1957 Ohio was 2–7 and 2–6–1, respectively. After consecutive losing seasons, Widdoes resigned as coach and became Ohio's athletics director.

=== Bill Hess era (1958–1977) ===
Widdoes handpicked a successor in Bill Hess, who had spent seven seasons as an assistant to Woody Hayes at Ohio State University and brought a similar philosophy to Athens. If one Bobcat coach could rival the success of Don Peden, it would be Hess, who was head coach from 1958 to 1977, although he was fighting terminal cancer during his last season (when the team went 1–10). In his 20 seasons at the helm, Hess had a 108–91–4 record for a winning percentage of .542. He was responsible for bringing 4 MAC titles and one National Championship to Athens. He also took the Bobcats to two bowl games, and oversaw countless winning seasons and exciting victories along the way. The 1958 season under Hess ushered in a new level of Bobcat success. Against a grueling schedule, Ohio was 5–4, and amassed a thrilling 23–6 upset of Louisville. That team outscored all opponents by a combined 159–102, but was only a precursor of the impending prominence. In Hess's second season in 1959, Ohio went 7–2, finishing as runners-up to an undefeated Bowling Green squad. The following year, 1960, the Green and White enjoyed what many argue was their best season ever. Behind the powerful running of Robert Brooks and the blocking and tackling of two-way standout Dick Grecni, the Bobcats went a perfect 10–0. In the process, they claimed the national small college championship. Grecni earned All-America honors and was one of five standouts on that team who eventually played professionally.

Two years later in 1962, Hess led Ohio to its first-ever bowl game, a matchup with West Texas State in the 1962 Sun Bowl. Jim McKee kicked a 52-yard field goal to put the Bobcats ahead early but they trailed at the half 7–3. In the third quarter, three time all-MAC performer Skip Hoovler intercepted a pass and ran it back 91 yards for a touchdown. Ohio led 14–7 late in the game before West Texas scored on a 32-yard touchdown pass and a two-point conversion to win 15–14. Hoovler was named Lineman of the Game, and his 91-yard interception still stands as a Sun Bowl record. Ironically, the Bobcats did not win the MAC in that 1962 season but did go to a bowl. The following season, Ohio won the league championship but was not invited to a bowl game. From 1964 to 1966, Hess's teams struggled, with the low point being a 0–10 season in 1965. The 'Cats were far from a disaster, however, and in 1967, Hess would claim his third MAC championship (shared with the Toledo). That team also raised eyebrows with a 30–15 win over Kansas, runners-up in the Big Eight conference that season. It was a performance that hinted at even greater things to come. In 1968, the most explosive Bobcat offense ever stormed its way to a 10–0 regular season, a MAC championship, and an invitation to the 1968 Tangerine Bowl. Along the way, they racked up 418 points in 11 games. That average of 37.6 points per game stood as the MAC record until 1997. The amazing pass-and-catch combination of Cleve Bryant and Todd Snyder, coupled with the sturdy running of Dave LeVeck and Bob Houmard, proved to be nearly unstoppable. The 1968 season also marked Ohio's first-ever appearance in the Top 20. On the heels of a 28–27 victory over the Bowling Green in which the Bobcats scored two touchdowns in the final four minutes, Bryant led the way to a 60–48 win against the Cincinnati. Sports Illustrated called it an "insane circus" and it helped to land the 'Cats at 18th in the United Press International coaches' poll and 20th in the Associated Press writers' poll. Ohio would cap off the season at the Tangerine Bowl against the Richmond and to no one's surprise the contest was another shootout. Bryant threw four touchdown passes and Snyder caught 11 passes for 214 yards. But it wasn't enough, however, as Richmond prevailed for a 49–42 win.

The 1969 season saw the Bobcats begin to tail off a bit, with the team only posting a record of 5–4–1. That team did score several impressive victories, though, with a 46–6 win over the Cincinnati and a 35–35 tie against Minnesota. Hess's squads would not enjoy a .500 record again until 1973, when the 'Cats were 5–5 with a 14–12 upset of the Northwestern. The 1974 and 1975 teams were 6–5 and 5–5–1, respectively, and built up to the successful 1976 season. In Hess's second to last year, Ohio managed a 7–4 mark, including a 6–2 record against MAC foes. Hess would also coach the 1977 while fighting a battle with cancer, leading the team to a 1–10 record that included numerous close losses to challenging opponents. Hess died on June 10, 1978, prior to the 1978 season.

=== Post-Hess era: Kappes, Burke, Bryant, Lichtenberg (1978–1994) ===
During the next 17 years, Ohio went through four different head coaches while seeking a return to the level that the program had achieved under Hess. Hess's immediate successor was Bob Kappes, who lasted only one year (1978) and posted a 3–8 record. Kappes was replaced by Brian Burke (1979–1984), who brought the program back to a reasonable level of respectability. The 1979 and 1980 teams were both 6–5, with the Bobcats managing to beat Miami both years. The 1982 squad also managed a 6–5 mark, with a key 20–0 win against Miami and a 17–14 upset of Toledo. Following a 1984 season that saw the 'Cats go 4–6–1, Burke was replaced by Cleve Bryant (1985–1989), an Ohio legend who was responsible for quarterbacking the 1967 and 1968 MAC championship teams. Bryant proved less successful as a coach, however, and led the team to a 2–9 record in his first year. He followed that up with 1–10 campaigns in 1986 and 1987, leading to his best year in 1988. That year, the 'Cats were 4–6–1, and beat Miami for the first time in 4 years. Bryant's team fell to 1–9–1 in 1989, though, and Bryant was subsequently relieved of his duties as coach of the 'Cats. The 1990 saw the arrival of Tom Lichtenberg (1990–1994) to coach the Bobcats, though the results on the field were similar to those seen under Bryant. The 1990 squad was 1–9–1, and that was followed up with a 2–8–1 performance in 1991. Lichtenberg's best year was 1993, in which he led the Bobcats to a 4–7 mark and a win over Miami for the first time since 1988. However, the 1994 Bobcats were winless, going 0–11 and leading to the dismissal of Lichtenberg and his staff.

=== Jim Grobe era (1995–2000) ===
In 1995, Jim Grobe took over an Ohio program that was in great need of an overhaul. He brought with him a unique offensive and defensive philosophy learned as a long-time assistant coach at the United States Air Force Academy. While most of the college football world was moving towards a high-octane passing attack, Grobe took the Bobcats back to the basics of the triple option, with wildly successful results. Ohio scored over 300 points in both 1996 and 1997, going 8–3 in 1997. It was the Green and White's first winning season in 15 years. Grobe's squads were prolific offensive teams, in spite of the media's ill-conceived notion of an "antique" offense. Kareem Wilson, the Bobcats' fireplug of a quarterback, was voted the MAC's Offensive Player of the Year following a 1996 season in which he rushed for 1,072 yards and a school-record 14 touchdowns. Meanwhile, fullback Steveland Hookfin was piling up 3,972 rushing yards during the same era to become Ohio's all-time rushing leader. Wilson's total of 3,597 yards still stands as the fifth-most ever by an NCAA quarterback. His 875 career carries are the most by a signal caller in college football history. Following the success of the 1996 and 1997 campaigns, Grobe teams fell to 5–6 in both 1998 and 1999. In 2000, however, the 'Cats went 7–4 and upset Minnesota for their first win over a Big Ten Conference team in 27 years. Ohio finished that season with a win over Marshall, giving the 'Cats two wins over bowl teams for the first time since the 1970s. The 2000 team also set a new school record for total offense, piling up 4,599 yards. The total broke the previous mark held by the legendary 1968 squad. After the 2000 season, however, Grobe left the 'Cats to become head coach of Wake Forest.

=== Brian Knorr era (2001–2004) ===
Grobe's appointed successor was Brian Knorr, who had been an assistant with Grobe while at Air Force and was Grobe's defensive coordinator at Ohio.

Knorr proved inept as a head coach, however, and posted a 1–10 mark in 2001 despite retaining many players from the 7–4 2001 squad. The Bobcats scored 198 points to their opponents 323 for the season, suffering back-to-back shutouts when they lost 44–0 to Buffalo on November 3, 2001, and then 17–0 to Bowling Green on November 10, 2001. Ohio closed the season with a 27–7 loss to North Carolina State, achieving a 6-game losing streak in the process.

Knorr and the Bobcats improved in 2002, finishing with a 4–8 standing. After opening the season with a 4-game losing streak, Ohio eventually defeated Buffalo 34–32 on September 28, 2002. Ohio lost 72–21 to Bowling Green a week later on October 5, 2002, but then posted a 55–27 win against Eastern Michigan on October 12, 2002, followed by a 50–0 shutout against Kent State on October 19, 2002. The only other win of the season was a 27–10 victory against Akron on November 9, 2002.

Ohio regressed to 2–10 in 2003. After winning their season opener 17–3 against Southeast Missouri State (then a non-major team), Knorr suffered 4 straight losses before prevailing 28–0 against UCF on October 11, 2003. The UCF victory would be the only reprieve for the 2003 Bobcats, as they went on to lose the final 6 games of the season, capped by a 28–0 shutout loss to Marshall on November 28, 2003.

In 2004 a slight improvement was seen with a 4–7 record. Knorr launched the season with a 42–14 win over VMI on September 4, 2004, followed by losses over the next two games. Then on September 25, 2004, the Bobcats shutout Buffalo 34–0, followed by a marquee 28–16 win against the Kentucky Wildcats a week later on October 2, 2004. The momentum didn't last, as Knorr took 4 straight losses before eking out 17–16 overtime win over UCF on November 6, 2004, subsequently wrapping up the season with a 31–19 loss to Akron on November 13, 2004. This modest uptick was too little too late for Knorr. He was fired after the 2004 season.

=== Frank Solich era (2005–2020) ===
Frank Solich was named the 28th football coach of the Bobcats on December 16, 2004. Prior to coming to Ohio, Solich spent many years as a part of the University of Nebraska football program, as a player, an assistant coach, and later as the head coach. Solich was head coach of the Cornhuskers from 1998 to 2003 where he directed Nebraska to 6 consecutive bowl games, including the national championship game in the 2002 Rose Bowl. Solich's impact on the Ohio program was immediate, as plans were put in place to renovate Ohio's football facilities and increase financial support for the football program. Also, Ohio was selected to appear on national television 6 times for the 2005 football season, a record for the program. Frank Solich's first home game as coach of Ohio was a memorable one, as Peden Stadium brought in its largest crowd ever at the time to watch the Bobcats defeat Pittsburgh 16–10 in overtime.

Under the guidance of Frank Solich, the Ohio football program enjoyed a return to national prominence in 2006. On November 16, 2006, the Bobcats secured their first ever Mid-American Conference East Division title and their first football championship of any sort since 1968 with a victory over Akron. The Bobcats advanced to the 2006 MAC Championship Game, where they were defeated by Central Michigan 31–10. Still, the Bobcats were invited to the 2007 GMAC Bowl on January 7, 2007; only the third bowl game in school history and their first since 1968. In that game, the Bobcats were defeated by Southern Mississippi 28–7. The Bobcats followed up the impressive 2006 campaign with a 6–6 record in 2007, and was one of 6 bowl eligible programs that was not invited to post-season play.

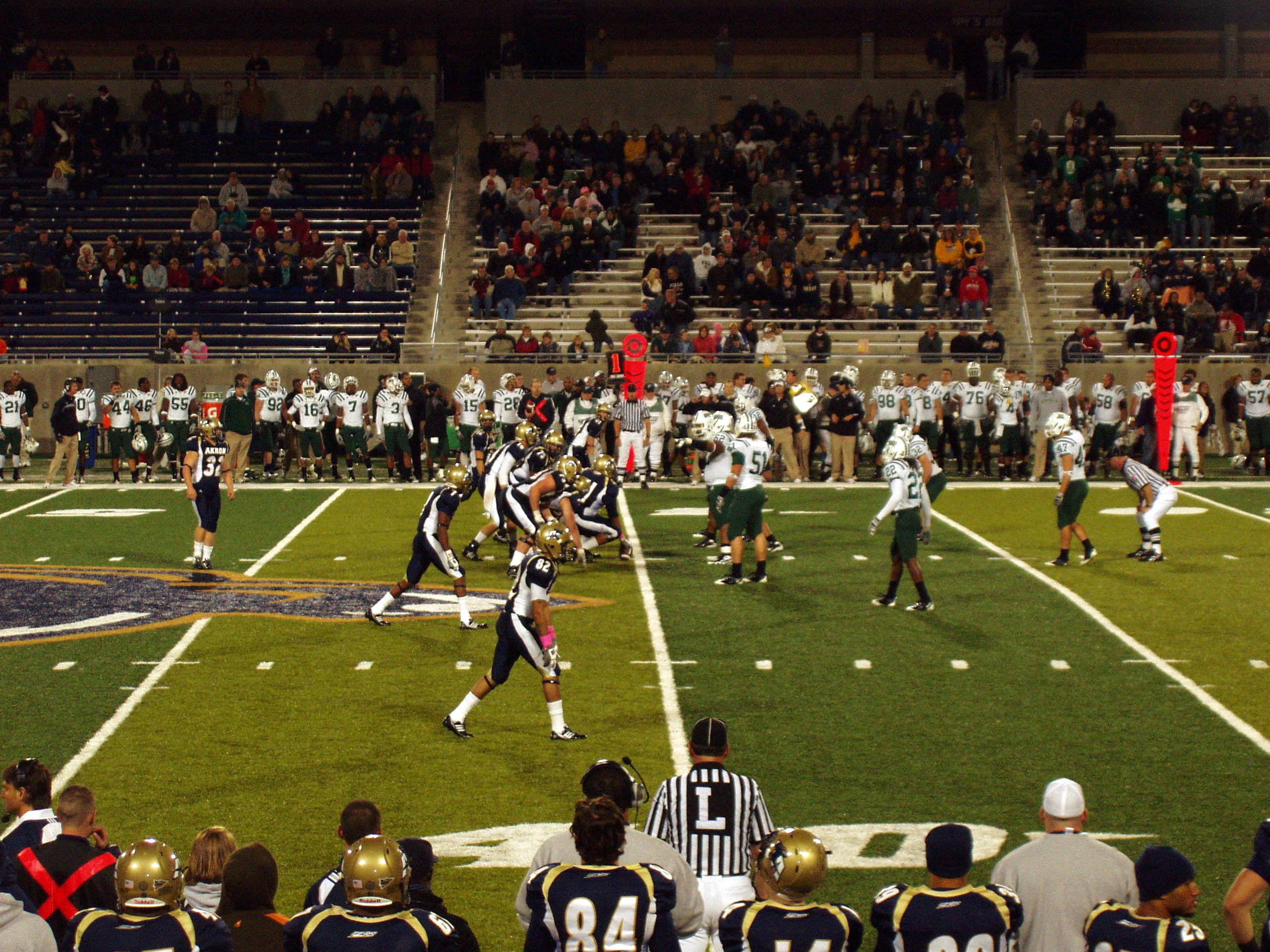
Ohio v Akron in 2009

The Bobcats returned to the post-season in 2009, posting a 9–3 regular season record and another MAC East Championship. Ohio played in the 2009 MAC Championship Game, where they fell to Central Michigan 20–10. On December 26, 2009, the Bobcats fell 21–17 to Marshall in the 2009 Little Caesars Pizza Bowl. The following season, the Bobcats won their home opener against Wofford before dropping their next three straight. The Bobcats went on to win their next seven before playing at Kent State for a chance to play in the MAC Championship game. The Bobcats were blown out at the hands of Troy on December 18, 2010, in the 2010 New Orleans Bowl 48–21.

After the loss in New Orleans, Solich sent top offensive assistants Tim Albin and Gerry Gdowski to Troy, Alabama to learn the spread offense. The season prior, he had sent assistants to Nevada to learn the pistol offense. Solich planned to use the pistol and the spread, scrapping the fullback dive for the zone-read run. Needing a quarterback that was both able to throw the ball downfield effectively and command the no-huddle offense a battle commenced for the starting quarterback position. Tyler Tettleton emerged as the starting quarterback over the likes of Kyle Snyder and Phil Bates, who switched his position to wide receiver. Ohio's new spread offense proved to be explosive in the early part of the season, averaging just under 40 points per game in their first 3 contests, all of which were convincing wins. The Bobcats would go on to finish 10–4 on the season, including a 20-point, 2nd half collapse in the 2011 MAC Championship Game against Northern Illinois. Despite the crushing loss, Ohio rebounded to defeat Utah State 24–23 in the 2011 Famous Idaho Potato Bowl. The win was the first bowl victory in the program's history.

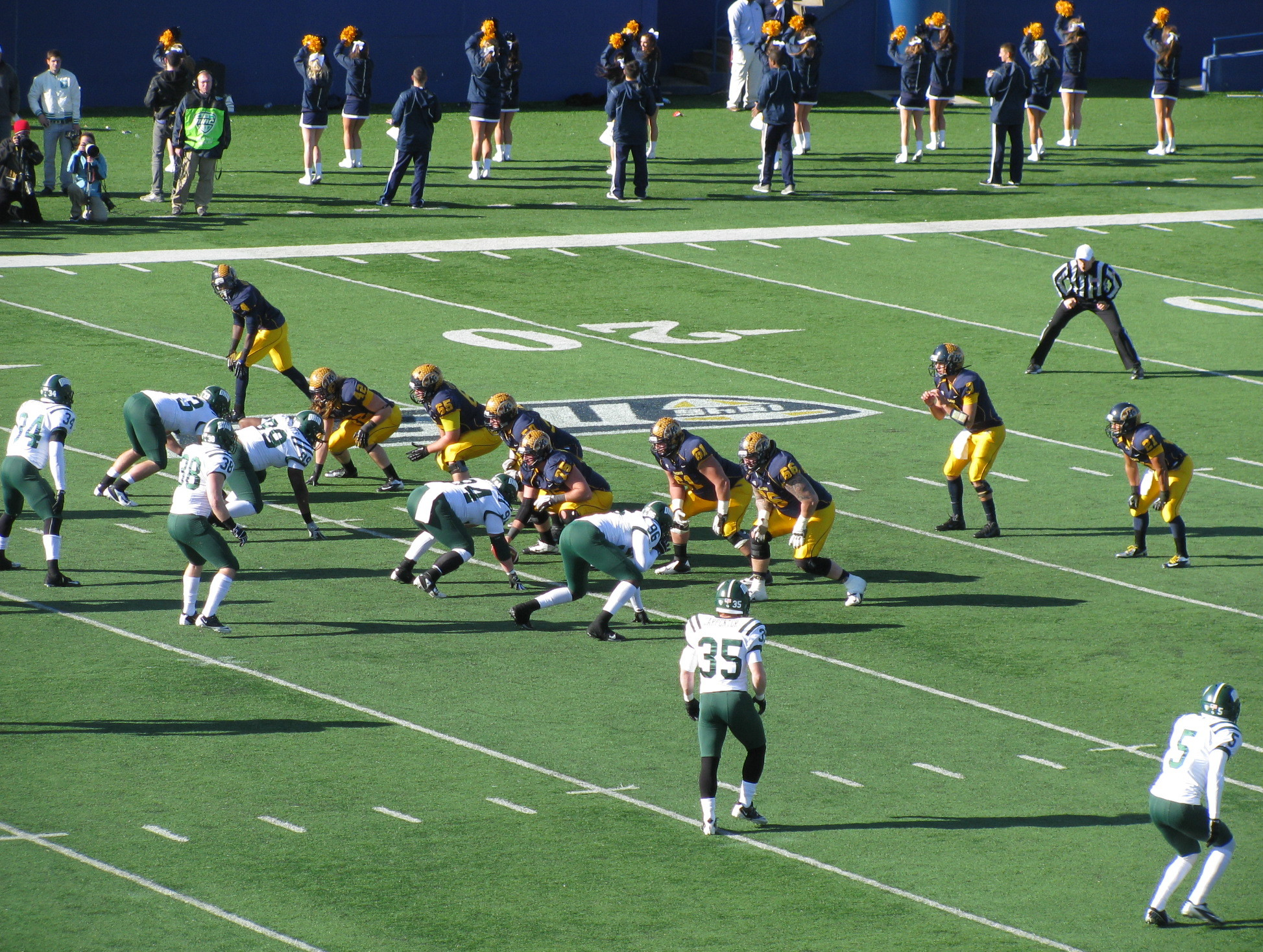
Ohio v Kent State, 2012

Ohio kicked off their 2012 season with a prime time nationally televised win on ESPN over Penn State and won their next six contests, starting the season 7–0 for the first time in 1968. The team's enhanced national reputation prompted the president of the United States, during a visit to campus in October 2012, to exclaim "I hear you Bobcats have quite an exciting football team and they are fun to watch...undefeated this year!" Following that win the Bobcats were ranked No. 25 in the Associated Press poll. The following week moved up to No. 23 in the AP Poll and No. 25 in the BCS standings, but were defeated 23–20 by the Miami University Redhawks on October 27 and dropped out of the top 25 in both the AP and BCS rankings. The Bobcats were consequently invited to the 2012 Independence Bowl and won their second straight bowl game, 45–14 over the University of Louisiana-Monroe Warhawks. In 2013, the Bobcats started 6–2, but went 1–4 the rest of the season, including a loss in the Beef 'O' Brady's Bowl to East Carolina. After consecutive second place seasons in 2014 and 2016, Ohio won the MAC East during the 2016 season but lost to an undefeated Western Michigan team in the 2016 MAC Championship Game During the 2018 season, Solich won his 109th game with the Bobcats, vaulting him past Hess to become the second-winningest coach in school history, behind only Peden. Solich recorded his 111th win as Ohio coach with 66–24 win over Bowling Green during the 2019 season, making him the winningest coach in MAC history. Ohio won three straight games in the 2017 Bahamas Bowl, 2018 Frisco Bowl and the Famous Idaho Potato Bowl after the 2019 season. Ohio was bowl eligible for twelve consecutive seasons from 2009 through 2020 at the end of Solich's tenure.

=== Tim Albin era (2021–2024) ===
On July 14, 2021, following Solich's retirement, longtime Bobcat offensive coordinator Tim Albin was named the 29th head coach of the program. In his first season, the Bobcats finished 3–5 in the MAC to finish in third place in the East Division. They went 0–4 in non-conference games including a loss to FCS Duquesne. This was Ohio's first losing season since 2008. The 2022 season marked a big turnaround from 2021. They finished the regular season on a seven-game winning streak with a 9–3 record and 7–1 mark in the MAC. They won the MAC East for the first time since 2016. but lost to Toledo in the MAC Championship Game. Ohio defeated Wyoming in the Arizona Bowl He led the Bobcats to their 2nd straight 9 win regular season in 2023. Their most impressive win to come in 2023 was over Iowa State University of the Big 12 Athletic Conference. Ohio finished the regular season with the fifth-best scoring defense in the FBS at 15.4 points per game, while allowing 96 rushing yards (8th) and 168 passing yards (7th) per game. Ohio accepted a bid to play Georgia Southern in the Myrtle Beach Bowl The Bobcats scored 41 points with the aid of five forced turnovers by the defense to cruise to a 41–21 victory.

In 2024, the football team had a third straight nine-win regular season. At 7–1 in MAC play they qualified to play Miami in the MAC Championship game Ohio defeated Miami 38–3 to win the MAC outright. Albin brought Ohio their first MAC Championship since 1968 and left after the game to take the head coaching position at Charlotte. Ohio accepted a bid to play Jacksonville State, the champions of Conference USA in the Cure Bowl.

=== Brian Smith era (2024–2025) ===
Offensive coordinator Brian Smith was named the interim head coach for the 2024 Cure Bowl after Albin resigned to take the head coach position at Charlotte. Ohio named him the permanent head coach a week later. Ohio won the bowl 30–27 and gave Brian Smith his first ever win, Ohio its first-ever 11-win season, and extended Ohio's bowl winning streak to six games. On December 1, 2025, after an 8–4 2025 regular season, Ohio announced that defensive coordinator John Hauser would take over as interim head coach effective immediately, with Smith on leave for "an undetermined period of time." On December 17, 2025, the university announced that Smith had been terminated for cause, citing "serious professional misconduct and...activities that reflect unfavorably on the University."

=== John Hauser era (2025–present) ===
Hauser earned his first win as a head coach as interim coach in a 17–10 win over UNLV in the Frisco Bowl. He was named full-time head coach three days after the bowl on December 26. It was Ohio's seventh straight bowl victory and completed a school record forty victories over a four-season stretch.

During his first full season in 2026, Hauser and the Bobcats won 29–27 over the Jacksonville State in a 4-overtime thriller, clinched by a two-point conversion from freshman third-string quarterback Levi Davis. It was the first Division 1 4OT game in 2 years.

== Conference affiliations ==
Ohio has been both an independent and conference-affiliated.

- Independent (1894–1909)
- Ohio Athletic Conference (1910–1925)
- Buckeye Athletic Association (1926–1938)
- Independent (1939–1946)
- Mid-American Conference (1947–present)

== Championships ==
=== National championships ===
Ohio was the 1960 small college national champion, as selected by both Associated Press and UPI in the 1960 small college football rankings. The team outscored its opponents 269–34.

Year	Coach	Selectors	Record	Conference Record
1960	Bill Hess	AP, UPI	10–0	6–0

=== Conference championships ===
Ohio has won twelve conference championships, 11 outright.

Season	Conference	Head coach	Overall record	Conference record
1929	Buckeye Athletic Association	Don Peden	9–0	5–0
1930	Buckeye Athletic Association	Don Peden	8–0–1	4–0
1931	Buckeye Athletic Association	Don Peden	7–1	4–0
1935	Buckeye Athletic Association	Don Peden	8–0	5–0
1936†	Buckeye Athletic Association	Don Peden	5–2–1	3–1–1
1938	Buckeye Athletic Association	Don Peden	7–2	3–1
1953	Mid-American Conference	Carroll Widdoes	6–2–1	5–0–1
1960	Mid-American Conference	Bill Hess	10–0	6–0
1963	Mid-American Conference	Bill Hess	6–4	5–1
1967	Mid-American Conference	Bill Hess	6–4	5–1
1968	Mid-American Conference	Bill Hess	10–1	6–0
2024	Mid-American Conference	Tim Albin	10–3	7–1

† Co-champions

=== Division championships ===
Year	Division	Coach	Overall Record	Conference Record	Opponent	CG Result
2006	MAC East	Frank Solich	9–5	7–1	Central Michigan	L 10–31
2009	MAC East	Frank Solich	9–5	7–1	Central Michigan	L 10–20
2011	MAC East	Frank Solich	10–4	6–2	Northern Illinois	L 20–23
2016†	MAC East	Frank Solich	8–6	6–2	Western Michigan	L 23–29
2022	MAC East	Tim Albin	10–4	7–1	Toledo	L 7–17

† Co-champions

== Bowl games ==
The Bobcats been to 17 bowl games, and have amassed an 9–8 bowl record.

Season	Bowl	Opponent	Result
1962	Sun Bowl	West Texas State	L 14–15
1968	Tangerine Bowl	Richmond	L 42–49
2006	GMAC Bowl	Southern Mississippi	L 7–28
2009	Little Caesars Pizza Bowl	Marshall	L 17–21
2010	New Orleans Bowl	Troy	L 21–48
2011	Famous Idaho Potato Bowl	Utah State	W 24–23
2012	Independence Bowl	Louisiana–Monroe	W 45–14
2013	Beef 'O' Brady's Bowl	East Carolina	L 20–37
2015	Camellia Bowl	Appalachian State	L 29–31
2016	Dollar General Bowl	Troy	L 23–28
2017	Bahamas Bowl	UAB	W 41–6
2018	Frisco Bowl	San Diego State	W 27–0
2019	Famous Idaho Potato Bowl	Nevada	W 30–21
2022	Arizona Bowl	Wyoming	W 30–27
2023	Myrtle Beach Bowl	Georgia Southern	W 41–21
2024	Cure Bowl	Jacksonville State	W 30–27
2025	Frisco Bowl	UNLV	W 17–10

== Head coaches ==
Coach	Tenure	Season(s)	Record	Pct.	Bowl games
Harvey Derne	1895	1	2–3	.400	
Frank Remsburg	1896	1	4–2–1	.643	
Warwick Ford	1897	1	7–2	.778	
Peter McLaren	1898	1	1–2–1	.375	
Fred Sullivan	1899, 1903	2	4–6	.400	
Karl Core	1900	1	2–4–1	.357	
Arlie C. Jones	1901	1	6–1–2	.778	
Harold Monosmith	1902	1	0–5–1	.083	
Henry Hart	1904	1	2–4–1	.357	
Joseph Railsbeck	1905	1	2–5–2	.333	
Arthur McFarland	1906–1908	3	13–10–1	.563	
Robert Wood	1909–1910	2	2–10–3	.233	
Arthur Hinaman	1911–1912	2	4–10–3	.324	
M. B. Banks	1913–1917	5	22–17–2	.561	
Frank Gullum	1918–1919	2	7–5–1	.577	
Russ Finsterwald	1920–1922	3	13–10–1	.563	
John C. Heldt	1923	1	3–5–1	.389	
Don Peden	1924–1946	23	121–46–11	.711	
Harold Wise	1947–1948	2	6–11–1	.361	
Carroll Widdoes	1949–1957	9	42–36–5	.536	
Bill Hess	1958–1977	20	108–91–4	.542	0–2
Bob Kappes	1978	1	3–8	.273	
Brian Burke	1979–1984	5	31–34–1	.477	
Cleve Bryant	1985–1989	5	9–44–2	.182	
Tom Lichtenberg	1990–1994	5	8–45–2	.164	
Jim Grobe	1995–2000	6	33–33–1	.500	
Brian Knorr	2001–2004	4	11–35	.239	
Frank Solich	2005–2020	16	115–82	.584	5–6
Tim Albin	2021–2024	4	33–19	.635	2–0
Brian Smith	2024–2025	1	9–4	.692	1–0
John Hauser	2025–present	1	4–2	.667	1–0
Total	1895–present		626–593–48	.513	9–8 .529

through 10/4/2026

== Rivalries ==
=== Miami (OH) ===
Ohio's archrival is the Miami RedHawks football team. The Battle of the Bricks is an annual all-sports rivalry competition between the Ohio and Miami athletic programs. The name "Battle of the Bricks" evolved from each school's reputation of having a campus of red brick roads. The rivalry between the Bobcats and RedHawks football teams was first played in 1908. The two oldest universities in Ohio, both schools are members of the Mid-American Conference. As of the last meeting in 2024, Miami leads the all-time series 56–43–2.

=== Marshall ===
Ohio's regional rival is Marshall. The annual football game between Ohio and Marshall is called the Battle for the Bell, with a traveling bell trophy as the prize for the victor. The two schools met in the 2009 Little Caesars Pizza Bowl in Detroit, with Marshall winning 21–17. Although Marshall had won each of the last six meetings between the schools up until the 2011 Ohio win of 44–7, Ohio leads the all-time series over the Thundering Herd with a record of 33–21–6. The most recent matchup was on September 14, 2019.

== Bobcat football traditions ==
Ohio football is rich in traditions, and Coach Solich has since his hiring made upholding tradition a cornerstone of his program. Some Ohio football traditions include:

- Rufus the Bobcat – The school mascot, a fierce yet friendly looking Bobcat that always sports an Ohio jersey with a number "1" on the back. Avowed enemy of Brutus Buckeye. The name 'Rufus' was given to the university mascot, after an alumnus, Michael A Massa, suggested that a proper name be given to the bobcat, in 2006. A university-wide name competition resulted in the popular new moniker.
- The Ohio University Marching 110 – "The Most Exciting Band in the Land" was ranked by Link Magazine in 1996 as one of the Top 10 college marching bands in the nation. They perform at every Ohio home football game and have marched in other events such as the Macy's Thanksgiving Day Parade, Tournament of Roses Parade, and numerous NFL games. The band was reborn in 1967 from its previous co-ed state, in which members wore green blazers and ties, and the women wearing the blazer with long skirts. Under Gene Thrailkill, the band became the all-male Marching Men of Ohio. In 1975, women were re-admitted to the band, and remain so to this day. The band is known for playing current day music, and putting on an energetic and exciting performance every game. The band is also known for its dance breaks, one of which is performed every halftime. The band is under the direction of Dr. Richard Suk.
- Washing the locker room – A Tradition started by Solich, At the start of every season the incoming recruiting class is asked to scrub the locker room. Solich says that this is an attempt to show the young guys that they are starting the season with a clean slate.
- Rivalry Mugs – Each Ohio football player and staff member gets a mug commemorating a win over their rival, Miami (OH)
- "Stand Up and Cheer" – Ohio's fight song
- "Alma Mater, Ohio" – Ohio's alma mater song
- Salute to the Students – Following every Ohio home football game, win or lose, Ohio football players head to the student section to thank the Bobcat's most rabid fans for attending, and sing "Alma Mater, Ohio" with the Marching 110, and students present.
- The Cannon – After every Ohio score, a 19th-century style military cannon is fired. When the Bobcats enter the field, the cannon shoots off a smoke "O" that can be seen for several minutes before fading into the air.
- Rubbing the Bobcat Statue, at entrance to Peden Stadium, for good luck on the gridiron.
- The "O Zone" – The student cheering section at every Ohio home football game.
- Tail-Great Park – The park across from Peden Stadium is transformed for every home football game into "Tail-Great Park". The park features kid's games, live music, and tailgating everywhere the eye can see on gameday.
- Homecoming Parade – The annual homecoming parade at Ohio begins in downtown Athens and ends in the Peden Stadium parking lot just in time for the big game. Always on a Saturday afternoon, homecoming is always one of the highest attended games of the football season.

== All-time MAC records ==
Updated through end of 2024 season. Only includes current MAC teams.

Opponent	W-L-T record
Akron	27–13–1
Ball State	13–15
Bowling Green	32–41–2
Buffalo	19–11
Central Michigan	7–27–2
Eastern Michigan	21–12–1
Kent State	47–27–2
Miami (OH)	43–56–2
Northern Illinois	11–14
Toledo	22–33–1
Western Michigan	31–34–1
Total	273–283–12

== NFL players and individual awards and achievements ==
=== Ohio's All-time players in the NFL ===
- Art Lewis, OT – 1936 New York Giants; 1938–1939 Cleveland Rams
- Bob Snyder, QB, 1936 Pittsburgh Pirates; 1937–1938 Cleveland Rams; 1938–1941,1943 Chicago Bears
- Chet Adams, OT – 1939–1942 Cleveland Rams; 1943 Green Bay Packers; 1946–1948 Cleveland Browns; 1949 Buffalo Bisons
- Vince Costello, LB – 1957–1966 Cleveland Browns; 1967–1968 New York Giants
- Robert Brooks, WR – 1961 New York Titans
- Allen Miller, LB – 1962–1963 Washington Redskins
- Chuck Turner, OT – 1966 Buffalo Bills
- Frank Peters, OT – 1969 New York Jets, 1969 Cincinnati Bengals
- Todd Snyder, WR – 1969–1973 Atlanta Falcons
- Dave Green, P – 1972–1975 Cincinnati Bengals; 1976–1978 Tampa Bay Buccaneers
- Brian Bertoia, OL – 1985 Cleveland Browns
- Glenn Hunter, RB – 1985 Pittsburgh Steelers
- John Guzik, DL – 1987 New England Patriots
- Jason Carthen, LB – 1993 Buffalo Bills; New England Patriots
- Dave Zastudil, P – 2002–2005 Baltimore Ravens; 2006–2010 Cleveland Browns; 2011–2014 Arizona Cardinals
- Chip Cox, DB – 2005 Detroit Lions; 2007 Washington Redskins
- Dion Byrum, CB – 2006–2007 Chicago Bears, Tampa Bay Buccaneers, Carolina Panthers
- Scott Mayle, WR – 2007–2008 Buffalo Bills
- Matt Muncy, LB – 2007 Cincinnati Bengals, 2008 Tennessee Titans
- Voncarie Owens, RB – 2007 New Orleans Saints
- Rudy Sylvan, TE – 2007–2008 Detroit Lions
- T.J. Wright, CB – 2007 Cincinnati Bengals
- Landon Cohen, DL – 2008–2015 Detroit Lions, Jacksonville Jaguars, New England Patriots, Seattle Seahawks, Arizona Cardinals, Philadelphia Eagles, Dallas Cowboys, Chicago Bears
- Todd Koenig, S – 2008 Cleveland Browns
- Kalvin McRae, RB – 2008 Kansas City Chiefs
- Ryan Senser, LS – 2008 New Orleans Saints, 2009 Seattle Seahawks
- Joshua Abrams, CB – 2008–2009 Green Bay Packers
- Mike Mitchell, S – 2009–2012 Oakland Raiders, 2013 Carolina Panthers, 2014–2017 Pittsburgh Steelers, 2018 Indianapolis Colts
- Taylor Price, WR – 2010–2011 New England Patriots, 2011–2013 Jacksonville Jaguars, 2014 Seattle Seahawks
- Julian Posey, CB – 2011 New York Jets, 2012 Miami Dolphins, 2013 Cleveland Browns
- LaVon Brazill, WR – 2012–2013 Indianapolis Colts
- Phil Bates, WR – 2012–2014 Seattle Seahawks, 2014–2015 Cleveland Browns, 2015 Dallas Cowboys
- Eric Herman, OL – 2013–2015 New York Giants 2015–2016 Baltimore Ravens
- Jordan Thompson, TE – 2014–2015 Detroit Lions
- **T. J. Carrie, CB – 2014–2017 Oakland Raiders, 2018–2019 Cleveland Browns, 2020–present Indianapolis Colts**
- **Tarell Basham, DE – 2017–2018 Indianapolis Colts, 2018–2020 New York Jets, 2021–present Dallas Cowboys**
- Blair Brown, LB – 2017–2019 Jacksonville Jaguars
- Casey Sayles, DL – 2017 Los Angeles Rams, 2018–2019 Pittsburgh Steelers
- Quentin Poling, LB – 2018–2019 Miami Dolphins, 2019 Oakland Raiders, 2019 Atlanta Falcons, 2020 Oakland Raiders, 2020 Minnesota Vikings. 2021 New Orleans Saints
- Troy Mangen, TE – 2018 Atlanta Falcons
- Papi White, WR – 2019 Jacksonville Jaguars, 2019 Tennessee Titans
- A. J. Ouellette, RB – 2019 New Orleans Saints, 2019 Cleveland Browns, 2019–2023 Toronto Argonauts, 2024–present Saskatchewan Roughriders
- Joe Lowery, OL – 2019 Chicago Bears
- **Armani Rogers, TE – 2022–present**

All players in bold are current NFL players.

=== Ohio's All-Americans ===
- Lenard Sadosky (1932)
- Art Lewis (1935)
- Danny Risaliti (1940)
- John Kerns (1946)
- Al Scheider (1951)
- Vince Costello (1952)
- Bob Brooks & Dick Grecni (1960)
- Skip Hoovler (1963)
- John Frick (1966)
- Cleve Bryant, Ken Carmon & Todd Snyder (1968)
- Mark Poindexter (1983)
- Dave Zastudil (2001)
- Dion Byrum (2005)
- LaVon Brazill, Gerald Moore, Noah Keller & Matt Weller (2009)
- Tarell Basham (2013)
- Joe Lowery (2018)

== Future non-conference opponents ==
Announced schedules as of October 1, 2026.

2027	2028	2029	2030	2035
at West Virginia	at Marshall	at West Virginia	at Tennessee	at James Madison
Towson	James Madison	Marshall		
Marshall	at Illinois			
at Texas State				
