= 2011 Famous Idaho Potato Bowl =

Ohio Bobcats	Utah State Aggies
(9–4)	(7–5)
MAC	WAC
24	23
Head coach: Frank Solich	Head coach: Gary Andersen
	1	2	3	4	Total
Ohio	0	7	10	7	24
Utah State	9	0	14	0	23
- Date: December 17, 2011
- Season: 2011
- Stadium: Bronco Stadium
- Location: Boise, Idaho
- MVP: WR LaVon Brazill, Ohio
- Favorite: Utah State by 3
- Referee: Penn Wagers (SEC)
- Attendance: 28,076
- Payout: US$750,000 per team

United States TV coverage
- Network: ESPN
- Announcers: Dave Flemming (Play-by-Play); Mike Bellotti (Analyst); Heather Cox (Sidelines)
- Nielsen ratings: 1.65 (2.4 million)

The 2011 Famous Idaho Potato Bowl, the 15th edition of the game, was a post-season American college football bowl game, held on December 17, 2011 at Bronco Stadium on the campus of Boise State University in Boise, Idaho as part of the 2011–12 NCAA Bowl season.

This was the first year the game was known as the Famous Idaho Potato Bowl. The game was known as the Humanitarian Bowl in 2010.

The game, which was telecast at 3:30 p.m. MT on ESPN, which featured the Utah State Aggies from the Western Athletic Conference (WAC), and the Ohio Bobcats from the Mid-American Conference.

Utah State accepted a bid to compete in the 2011 edition of the game on November 28, with Ohio accepting the other bid on December 4.

== Teams ==
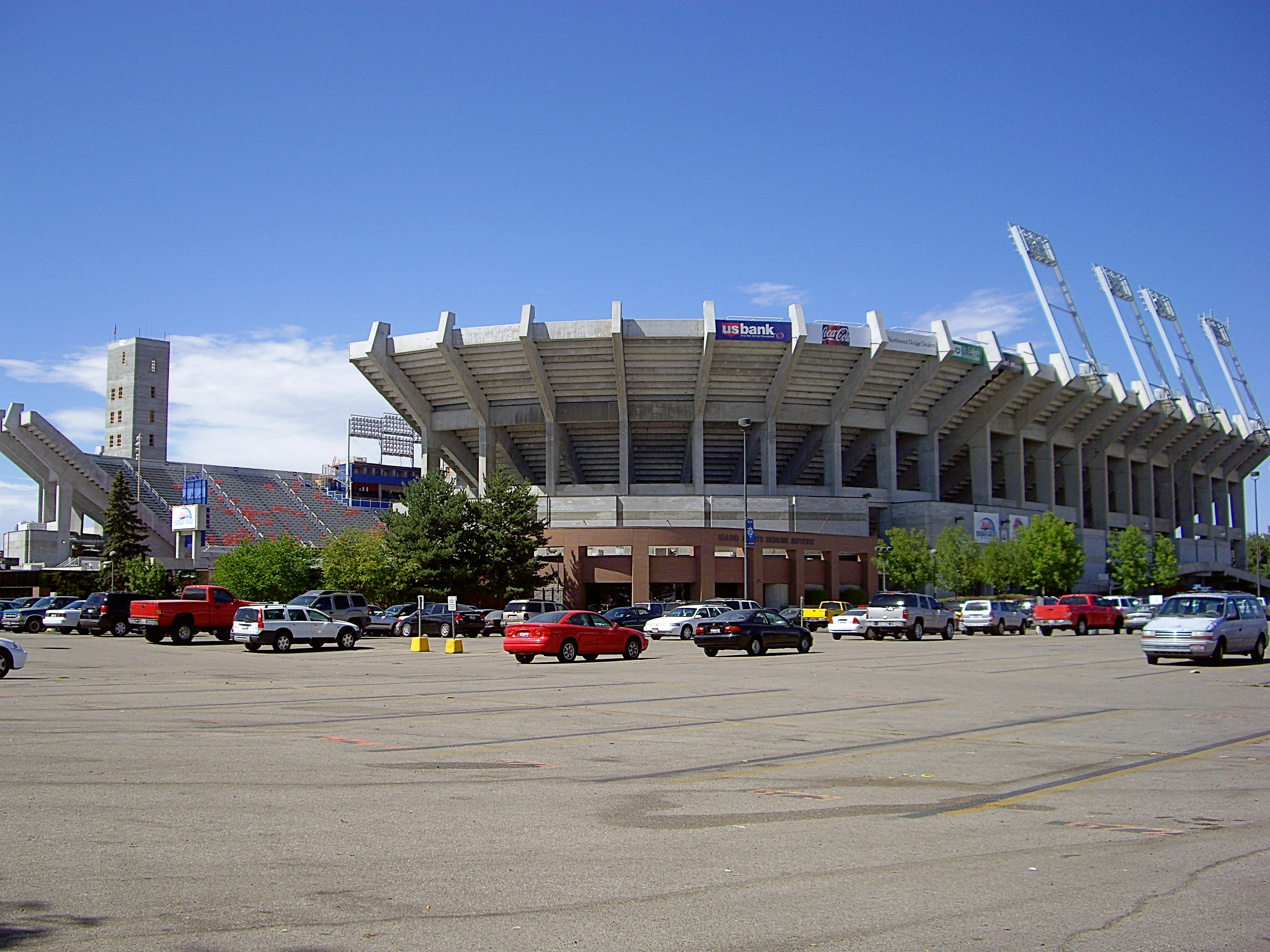
Bronco Stadium, where the 2011 Famous Idaho Potato Bowl was played.

=== Utah State ===
On November 28, 2011, the Utah State Aggies accepted an invite to represent the WAC. The Aggies entered the bowl with a record of 7–5, their first winning season since 1996. One notable game from Utah State's season was against defending national champions Auburn, where they nearly upset the Tigers 38-42. The 2011 Famous Idaho Potato Bowl marked the first appearance in a bowl game for Utah State since the game's very first incarnation as the 1997 Humanitarian Bowl. The Aggies were looking for their first bowl win since the 1993 Las Vegas Bowl. Utah State entered the game on a 5-game winning streak after starting 2-5.

=== Ohio ===
On December 4, 2011, the Ohio Bobcats accepted an invite to represent the MAC. The Bobcats entered the bowl with a record of 9–4 and were the MAC-East division champions. However, they lost to NIU in the 2011 MAC Championship Game 20-23. The Famous Idaho Potato Bowl marked the third consecutive appearance in a bowl game for Ohio, following the 2009 Little Caesars Pizza Bowl and the 2010 New Orleans Bowl. The Bobcats hoped to win their first bowl game in school history.

The two teams had met before on September 17, 1994, when Utah State won 5-0 at Ohio.

== Game summary ==
Utah State received the ball first and drove to the 1-yard line of Ohio. However, the Aggies were unable to convert to on a 4th down, turning the ball over to Ohio. On Ohio's first drive, quarterback Tyler Tettleton recovered his own fumble and ran to the back of his endzone for a safety. USU scored in again in the 1st quarter on a 3-yard touchdown pass from quarterback Adam Kennedy to go up 9-0. Ohio cut the lead to 2 in the second quarter when Tettleton completed a 26-yard pass to Derek Roback.

Ohio received the ball to start the second half, but had to punt the ball away after they were unable to get a first down. On the ensuing drive, Utah State's Michael Smith rushed for a 63-yard touchdown to go up 16-7. Ohio responded with a 32-yard field goal to make the score 16-10. However, Utah State went up 23-10 with another rushing touchdown from Michael Smith. Ohio was able to respond again with a 44-yard touchdown pass to LaVon Brazill to cut the deficit to 17-23.

The Aggies had a chance to end the game with possession at their own 7-yard line with 4:23 to go. However, Utah State had to punt the ball away with 2:21 left. The Bobcats were able to drive down the field and score on a 1-yard rush by Tettleton with 13 seconds remaining, going up 24-23 after the extra point. The Bobcats were able to hold to victory after the Aggies were unable to score on their final possession.

With the win, the Ohio Bobcats won their first bowl game in school history. The Bobcats also had their first 10-win season since 1968.

== Scoring summary ==
Source.

Scoring Play	Score
1st Quarter
USU – Ball falls through endzone, safety, 8:02	USU 2–0
USU – Tarren Lloyd 3 Yd Pass From Adam Kennedy (Josh Thompson Kick), 3:39	USU 9-0
2nd Quarter
Ohio – Derek Roback 26 Yd Pass From Tyler Tettleton (Matt Weller Kick), 4:40	USU 9-7
3rd Quarter
USU – Michael Smith 63 Yd Run (Josh Thompson Kick), 12:19	USU 16-7
Ohio – Matt Weller 32 Yd field goal, 9:52	USU 16-10
USU – Michael Smith 11 Yd Run (Josh Thompson Kick), 5:51	USU 23-10
Ohio – LaVon Brazill 44 Yd Pass From Tyler Tettleton (Matt Weller Kick), 3:45	USU 23-17
4th Quarter
Ohio – Tyler Tettleton 1 Yd Run (Matt Weller Kick)	Ohio 24-23

=== Statistics ===
Statistics	Ohio	USU
First downs	22	18
Rushes-yards (net)	42–125	50–345
Passing yards (net)	220	96
Passes, Att-Comp-Int	26–19–0	19–12–0
Total offense, plays – yards	68–345	69–441
Time of Possession	26:48	33:12

== Referee call ==
This game was notable for a confusing set of explanations by referee Penn Wagers on the play that led to the game-winning touchdown. The initial ruling on the field is that Ohio wide receiver LaVon Brazill had crossed the goal line for the touchdown on a reception from Tyler Tettleton. But a replay review of the play was issued following the play to determine if Brazill was downed before getting the ball into the end zone. After a first look, Wagers came out to confirm the touchdown, indicating that the evidence is clear that Brazill scored the touchdown. But there was confusion as to the reason it was a touchdown. It appeared that Brazill fumbled the ball and since he recovered his own fumble, that he is allowed to advance it making the score a touchdown. After further discussion, Wagers came out and said:

"There's a correction on the play. The receiver who recovered the ball, I mean, fumbled the ball, into the end zone, was the player who ended up getting the ball in the end zone. Therefore, it is a touchdown."

However, after another review, the touchdown was reversed since Brazill was downed before getting the ball into the end zone. Wagers then said:

"Replay has reviewed, the boy who caught the pass was down at the 6-inch line prior to fumbling the ball. That is the ruling. The ball will be placed at the 6-inch line. First down."

Two plays later, Ohio scored the game-winning touchdown.
