= Peden Stadium =

Football stadium on the campus of Ohio University in Athens, Ohio

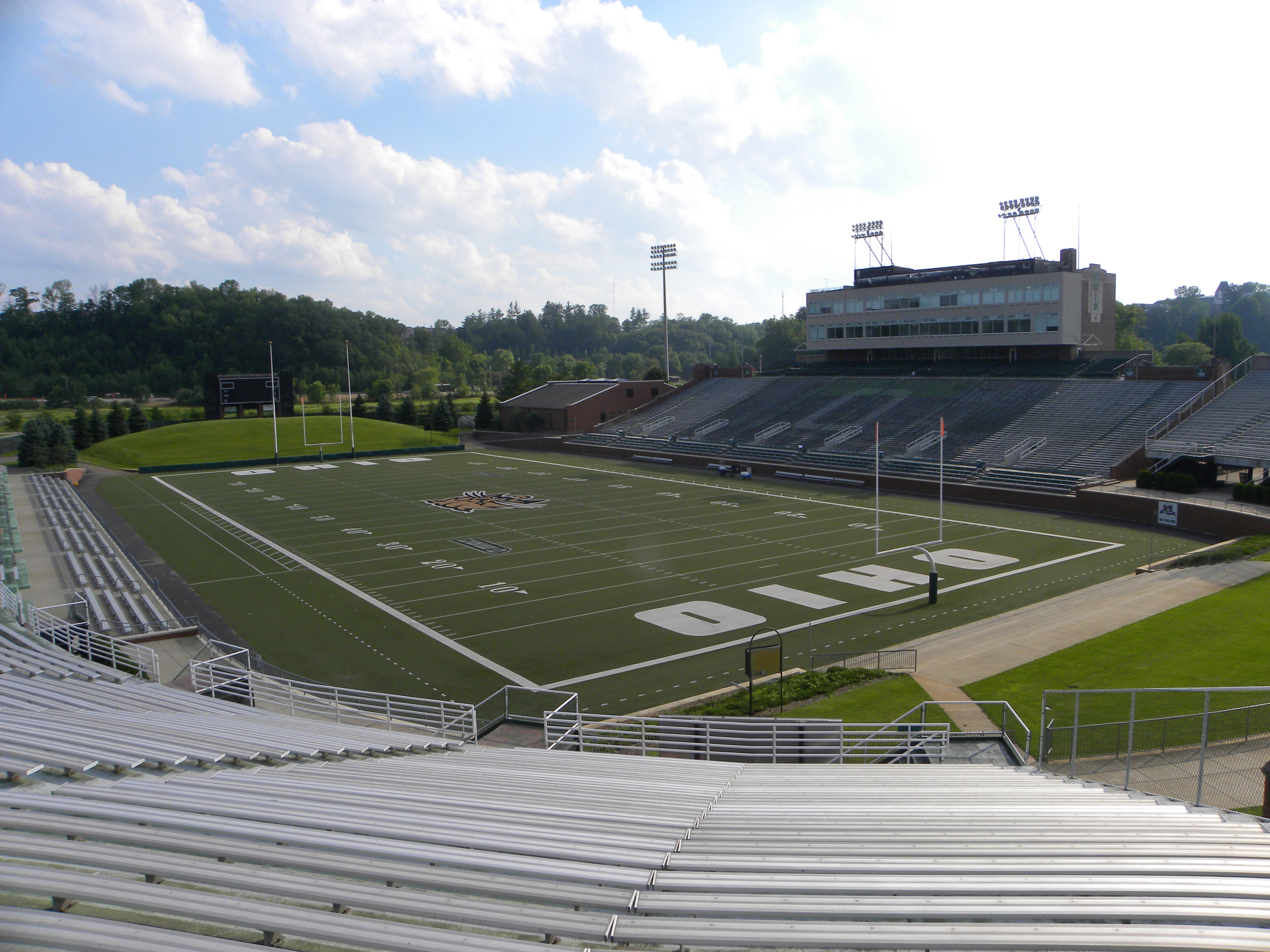
- Peden Stadium Interior
- Interactive map of Peden Stadium
- Former names: Ohio University's Athletic Plant (1929–1946)
- Location: 200 Richland Avenue; Athens, OH 45701
- Coordinates: 39°19′16″N 82°6′10″W
- Owner: Ohio University
- Operator: Ohio University
- Capacity: 24,000
- Surface: FieldTurf (2002–present); Natural grass (1929–2001)
- Record attendance: 26,740 (September 6, 2025 vs. West Virginia)

Construction
- Groundbreaking: 1927
- Opened: October 5, 1929
- Renovated: 2001
- Expanded: 1986, 2001
- Cost: $185,000 ($3.47 million in 2025 dollars)
- Architect: Osborn Engineering Company

Tenant
- Ohio Bobcats (NCAA) (1929–present)

Peden Stadium, also known as Frank Solich Field at Peden Stadium since August 2022, is an American football stadium on the campus of Ohio University in Athens, Ohio. Situated on the banks of the Hocking River with a seated capacity of 24,000, Peden Stadium has been the home of the Ohio Bobcats Football team since 1929. An example of early 20th Century sports venues, it is the oldest college football venue in the Mid-American Conference, the third oldest in Ohio, and the 29th oldest college stadium in the nation.

== History ==
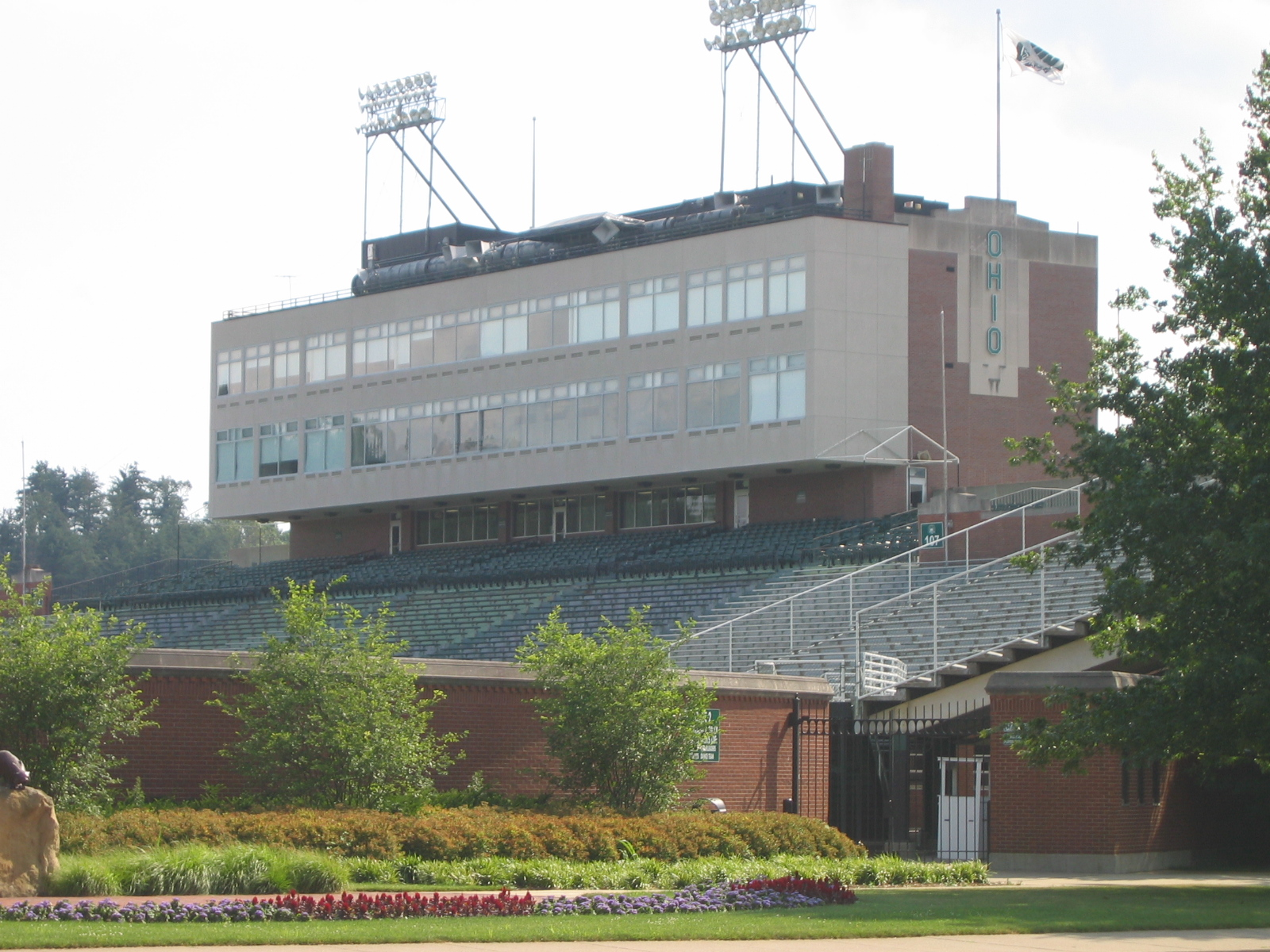
Peden Tower, before stadium renovation

The stadium was named in honor of Don C. Peden, a coach and director of athletics at Ohio University for 27 years. He was one of the founders of the Mid-American Conference and a national force in intercollegiate athletics, especially football and baseball. He was born in Kewanee, IL, and died in 1970 at the age of 71.

The facility, originally known as Ohio Stadium, not to be mistaken for Ohio Stadium in Columbus, was built at a cost of $185,000 and was completed in 1929. The stadium originally sat 12,000 fans with grandstands on each side of the playing field. The first game at the venue featured a 14–0 Bobcats victory over archrival Miami University in front of a sellout crowd. Following the retirement of legendary Ohio football coach Don Peden in 1946, the stadium was renamed Peden Stadium. It was designed by Osborn Engineering, who designed other sports venues such as Yankee Stadium, Fenway Park, and Cleveland Stadium.

The "Bobcat's Lair" has undergone several modifications through the years. In 1986, the seating capacity was increased to 19,000 with the addition of two new grandstands in the north end zone. Four years later, a five story tower, called the Peden Tower, was added to the stadium's west side. Today, it houses press boxes, game-day suites, football offices, athletic training facilities, team meeting rooms, a recruiting lounge, a ticket office, the football locker room, and Ohio Athletics' academic services and compliance departments. In 1999, a new 10,000-square-foot (930 m^{2}) strength and conditioning center called The Carin Center was added to the ground level of Peden Stadium.

Several other historic events have occurred at the Stadium, including a visit by then President Lyndon B. Johnson, as well as an event which featured a landing by helicopter on the 50-yard line by former President Eisenhower. The stadium has served as a venue for many visiting national collegiate teams including the Big Ten. A bronze life-sized sculpture of an Ohio Bobcat, stands poised at the north of the stadium outside of the Sook Academic Center.

In 2009, in anticipation of the 75th anniversary of its construction in 2011, after a suggestion by Alumnus Michael Massa, Peden Stadium was officially designated an Ohio Historical Site, and an historical marker erected in Drew Park.

In August 2022, the University announced that the Board of Trustees agreed to name the football field in Peden Stadium for former head coach Frank Solich, who served as the head coach for the football program from 2005–21 and earned the title of Winningest Coach in the Mid-American Conference with a 115-82 overall record. Through October 17, 2026 Ohio is 26–1 on the new field. On that day, 16 straight wins at Peden for the program gave the stadium the nation's longest current home winning streak after Indiana's loss to Ohio State on Oct. 17.

== Current facility ==
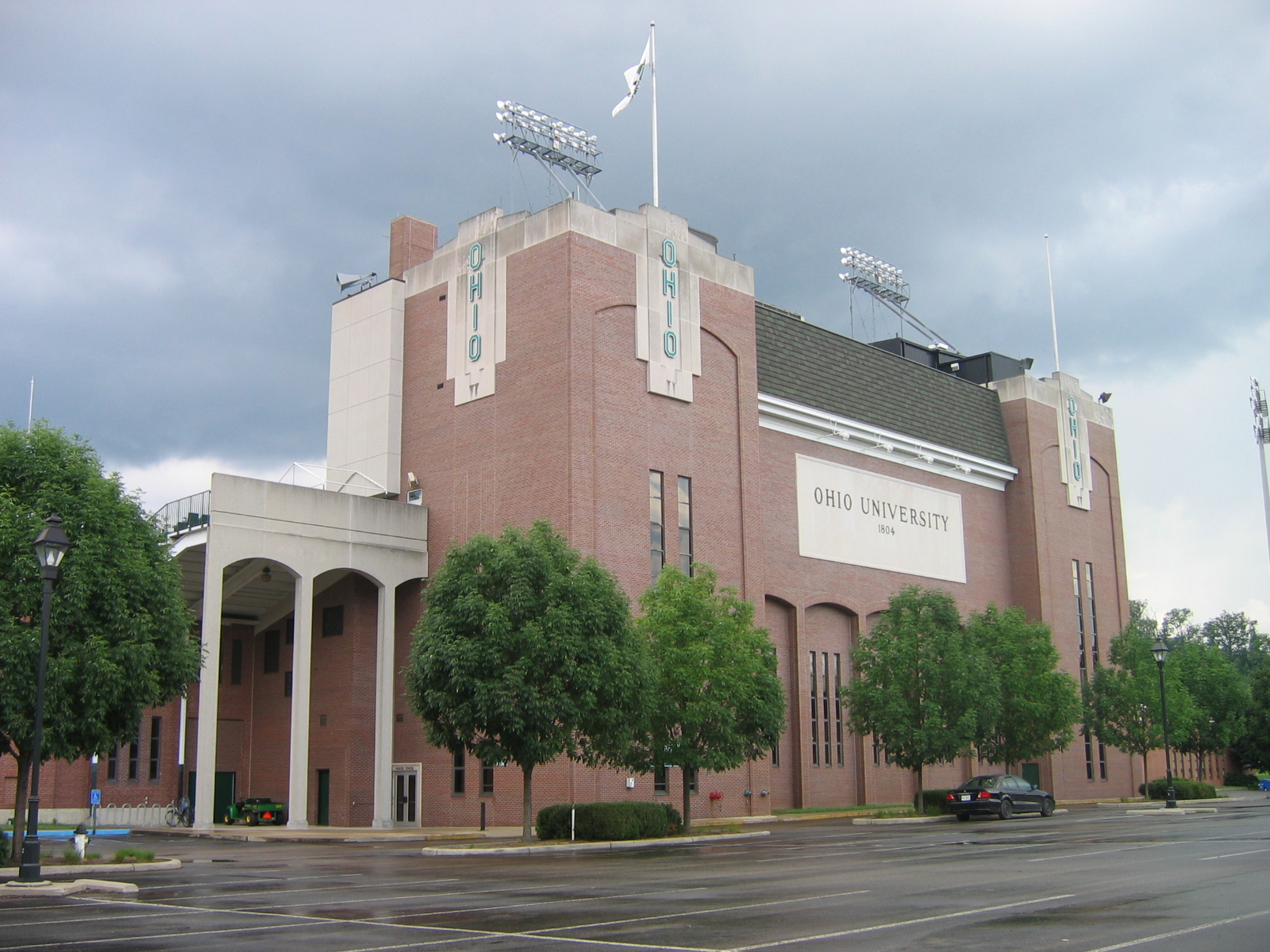
Peden Tower Exterior in 2008

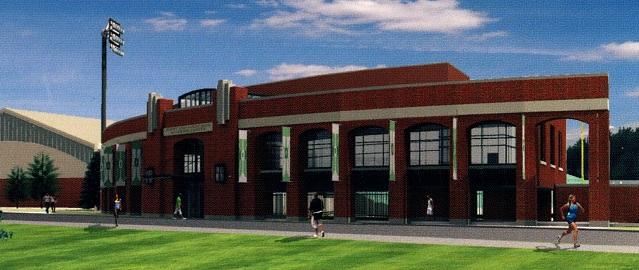
Academic wing model, now completed

Some of the most extensive renovations, though, occurred after the 2000 football season. This $2.8 million project removed the track, lowered the stadium's playing surface by 10 feet (3.0 m), and increased the seating capacity to its current mark of 24,000 with the addition of lower-level, bleacher-back seats collectively called the Phillips Club, plus added capacity of the Sook Center on game days. Also during this renovation, permanent seating for the marching band, The Ohio University Marching 110, was created in the north end zone and Victory Hill, a grass berm for overflow seating, was added to the south end of the field. In 2002, the natural grass playing surface at the stadium was replaced with FieldTurf, and in 2017, an updated video scoreboard was added to the south end zone. Following the completion of the 2004 season, the stadium underwent another large project that renovated/expanded the stadium's athletic training facilities, added a large team auditorium, improved position meeting rooms, expanded the recruiting lounge, and enlarged office space for the football coaches. In 2009, the Marching 110's former permanent location in the north end zone was transformed into "Touchdown Club" donor seating, and the band returned to their former location in the general admission seating by the student section. The most recent update occurred in 2022, where new field turf was installed over the summer.

The stadium has been used for several other purposes. It has hosted numerous local high school football games and high school state playoff games. In addition, the stadium serves as the home of Ohio's "O Zone" Student Cheering Section, The North End Terrace Club, The Bobcat Club, and an annual homecoming "Yell Like Hell" pep rally as well as having been the site of several concerts. 5k Runs have started from the 50 yard line. It even served as a helicopter landing area for former President Eisenhower in the 1960s.

== Perry and Sandy Sook Academic Center ==
In 2014, the administration of the Department of Intercollegiate Athletics, along with Varsity OHIO and affiliated university alumni organizations and bodies, began a cooperative campaign for a state-of-the-art academic wing at Peden Stadium due to crowded interior space for students, and renovated locker rooms for teams that had not received prior renovations. Incorporated into this new building are public-use pavilions and a sports supporter club terrace. Completed in the fall of 2018, and designed by Ohio-based MSA Sport, the Perry and Sandy Sook Center is 26,000 square feet. It contains an academic advising area (including offices, tutor rooms, and conference areas), a large multi-purpose classroom that also serves as a game-day hospitality area, and a large observation deck overlooking the field.

== Capacity ==
Though the attendance for Peden Stadium is listed at 24,000, Victory Hill allows for standing room beyond the listed capacity. As such, the attendance records at the stadium all eclipse the 24,000 mark, and additionally, a potential standing capacity for 28,000 was created when the academic center was completed at the stadium's north endzone in 2018.

=== Largest attendance ===
Rank	Date	Attendance	Result
1	September 6, 2025	26,740	Ohio 17 - West Virginia 10
2	September 8, 2012	25,893	Ohio 51 - New Mexico State 24
3	October 13, 2012	25,542	Ohio 34 - Akron 28
4	September 20, 2014	25,211	Ohio 36 - Idaho 24
5	September 12, 2015	25,210	Ohio 21 - Marshall 10
6	October 10, 2015	25,086	Ohio 34 - Miami (Ohio) 3

== Other uses ==
In addition to serving as the home of Ohio Bobcats football games, the stadium has been used for several other purposes. It has hosted numerous local high school football games and high school state playoff games. In addition, the stadium serves as the home of Ohio's "O Zone" Student Cheering Section, The North End Terrace Club, The Bobcat Club, and an annual homecoming "Yell Like Hell" pep rally as well as having been the site of several concerts. 5k Runs have started from the 50 yard line. It even served as a helicopter landing area for former President Eisenhower in the 1960s as well as staging areas for visits from Presidents Johnson and Obama.

== Gallery ==
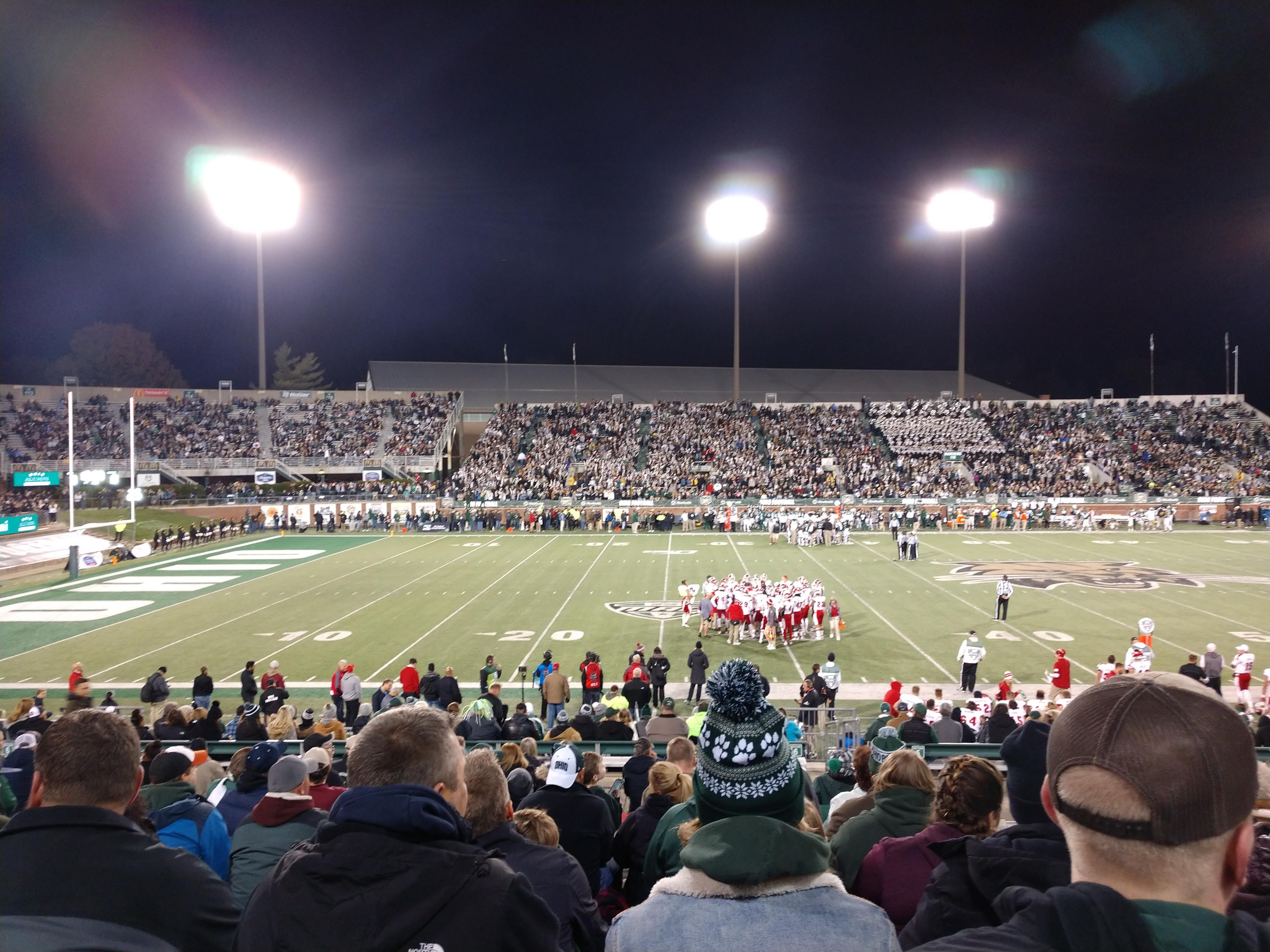
Peden Stadium hosted the Miami RedHawks in College Football's 150th Anniversary Game on November 6, 2019.

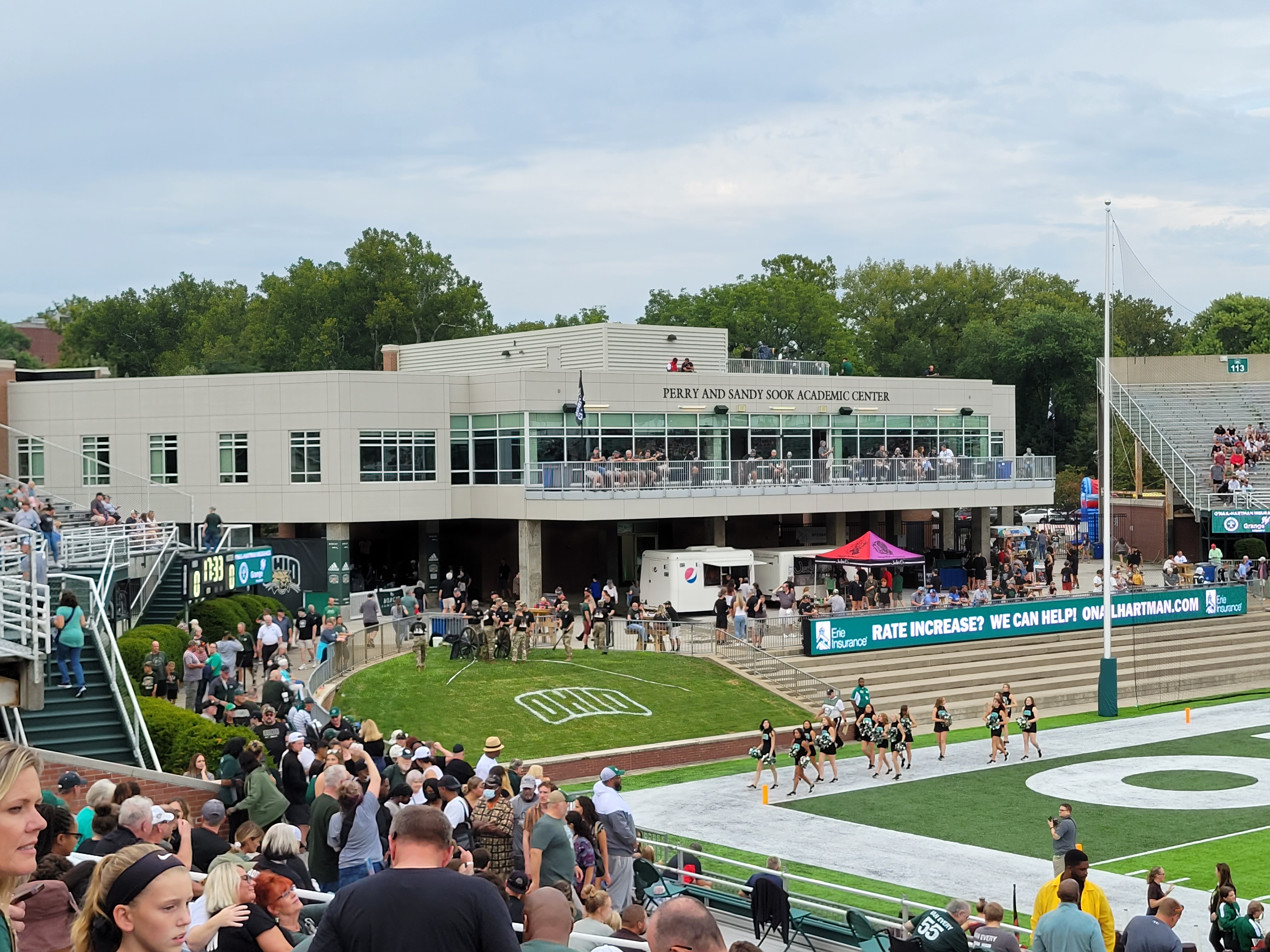
Sook Center from the field side prior to a game on September 3, 2022

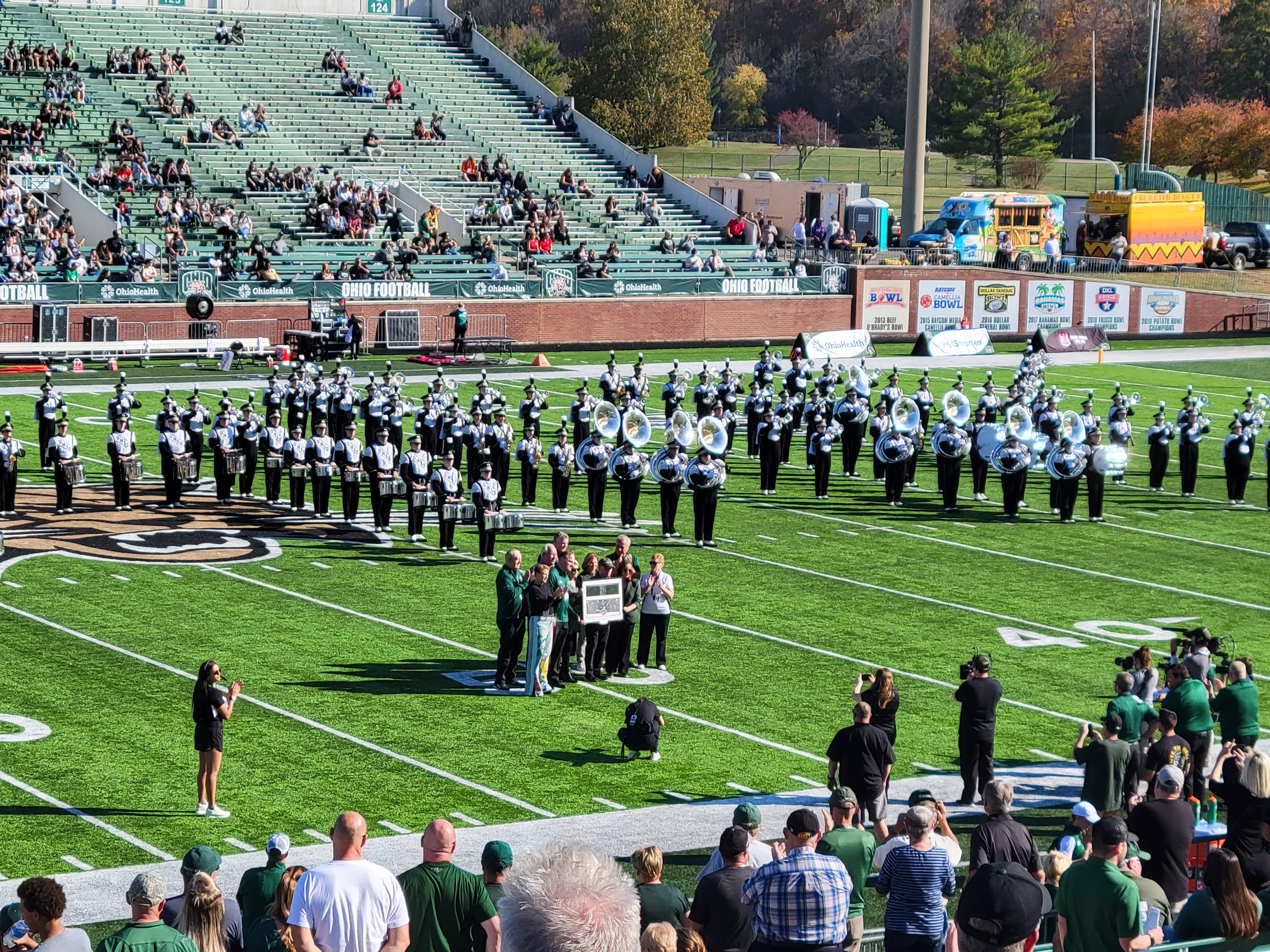
The field at Peden Stadium was named after former football coach Frank Solich in 2022.

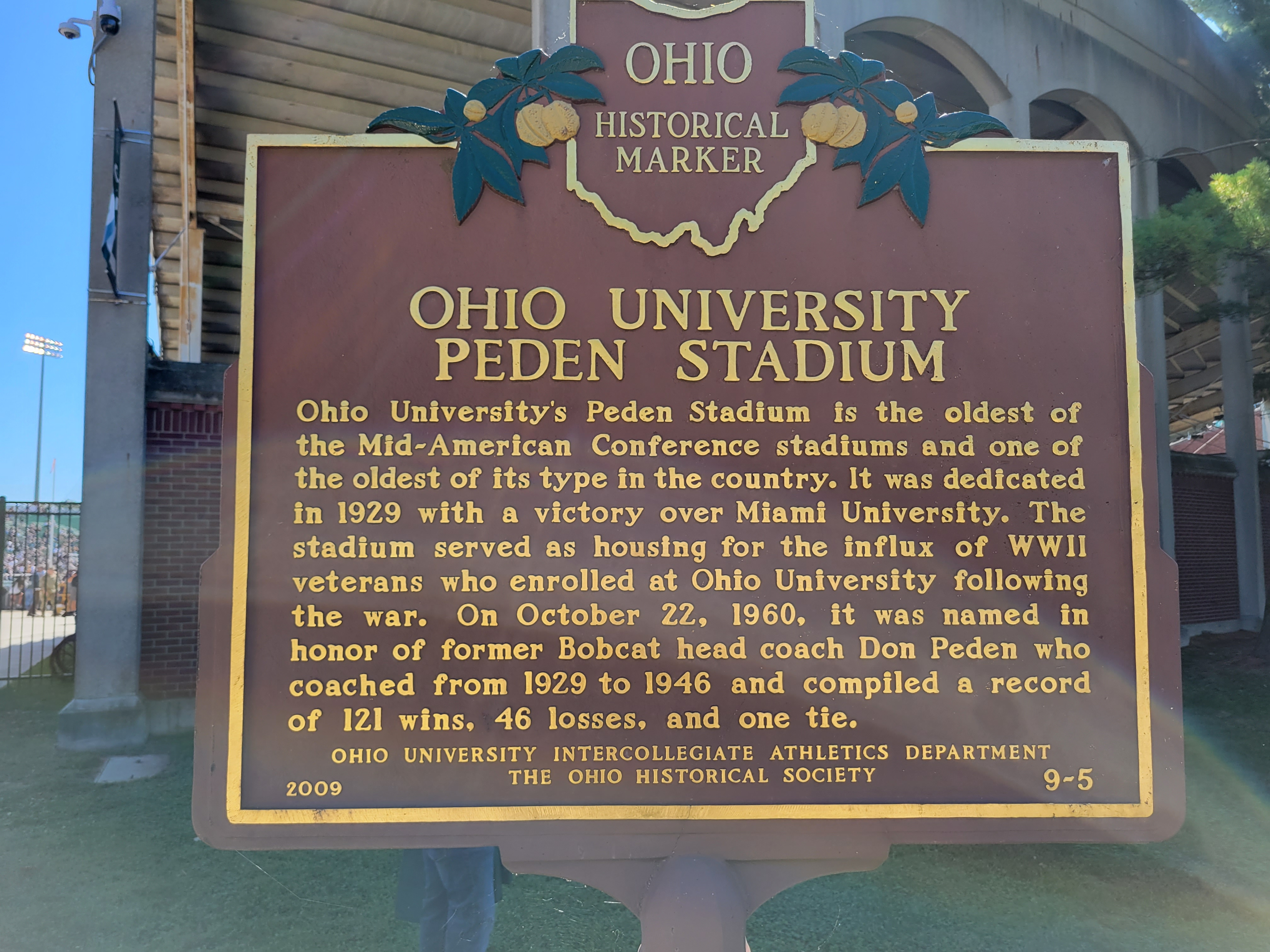
Historical marker

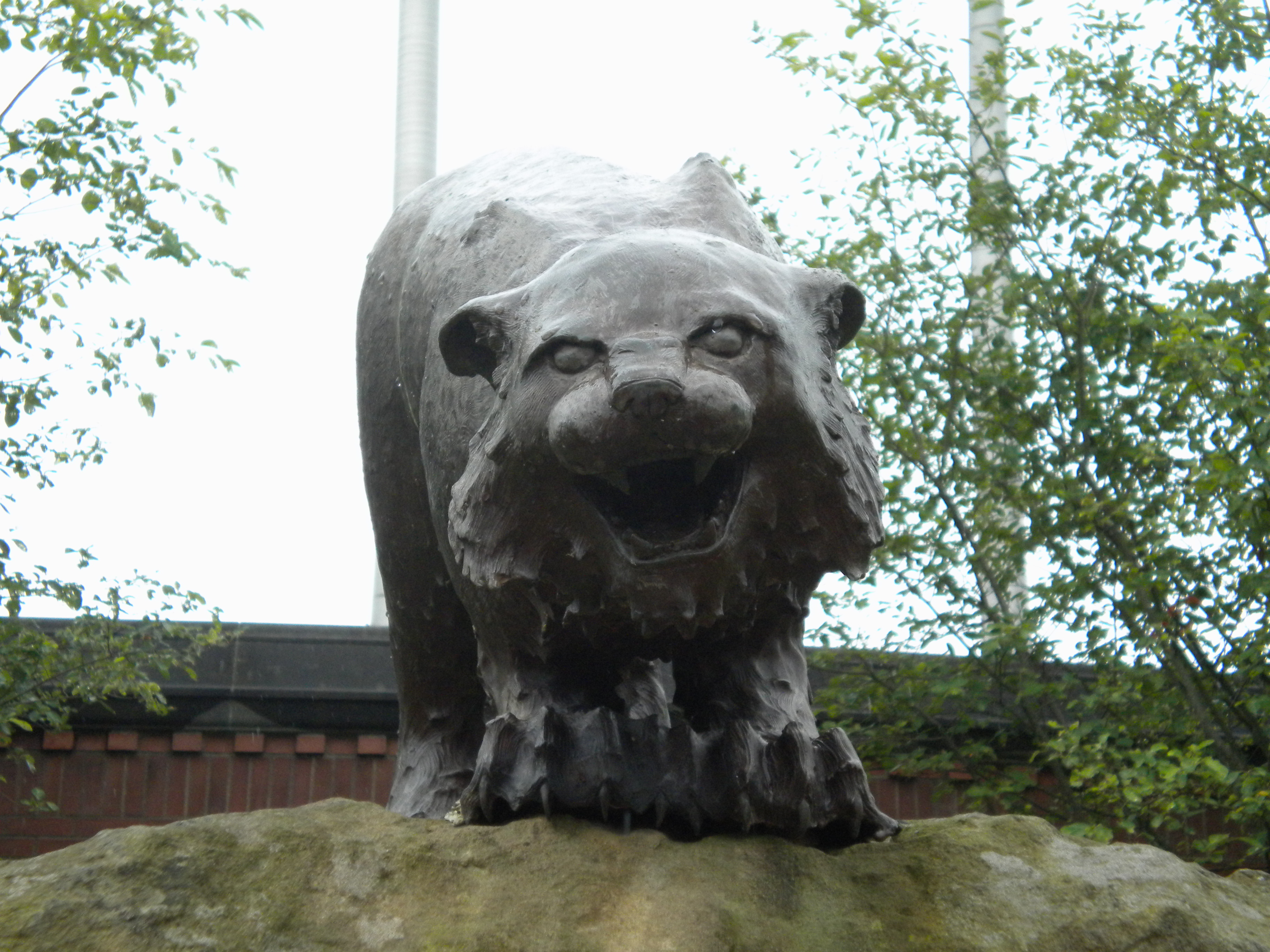
Bobcat statue at Peden Stadium

== See also ==
- List of NCAA Division I FBS football stadiums
