= 2011 Kent State Golden Flashes football team =

American college football season

2011 Kent State Golden Flashes football
- Conference: Mid-American Conference
- East
- Record: 5–7 (4–4 MAC)
- Head coach: Darrell Hazell (1st season)
- Offensive coordinator: Brian Rock (1st season)
- Offensive scheme: Spread
- Defensive coordinator: Jon Heacock (1st season)
- Base defense: 4–3
- Home stadium: Dix Stadium

2011 Mid-American Conference football standings
	Conf.			Overall
Team	W		L	W		L
East Division
Ohio xy	6	–	2	10	–	4
Temple	5	–	3	9	–	4
Kent State	4	–	4	5	–	7
Bowling Green	3	–	5	5	–	7
Miami (OH)	3	–	5	4	–	8
Buffalo	2	–	6	3	–	9
Akron	0	–	8	1	–	11
West Division
Northern Illinois xy$	7	–	1	11	–	3
Toledo x	7	–	1	9	–	4
Western Michigan	5	–	3	7	–	6
Ball State	4	–	4	6	–	6
Eastern Michigan	4	–	4	6	–	6
Central Michigan	2	–	6	3	–	9
Championship: Northern Illinois 23, Ohio 20
$ – Conference champion; x – Division champion/co-champions; y – Championship game participant

The 2011 Kent State Golden Flashes football team represented Kent State University in the 2011 NCAA Division I FBS football season. The Golden Flashes were led by first-year head coach Darrell Hazell and played their home games at Dix Stadium. They are a member of the East Division of the Mid-American Conference. They finished the season 5–7, 4–4 in MAC play to finish in third place in the East Division.

== Schedule ==
Date	Time	Opponent	Site	TV	Result	Attendance
September 3	12:21 pm	at No. 2 Alabama*	Bryant–Denny Stadium; Tuscaloosa, AL	SEC Network	L 7–48	101,821
September 10	7:00 pm	Louisiana–Lafayette*	Dix Stadium; Kent, OH		L 12–20	10,386
September 17	7:00 pm	at Kansas State*	Bill Snyder Family Football Stadium; Manhattan, KS	FCS	L 0–37	50,483
September 24	3:30 pm	South Alabama (FCS)*	Dix Stadium; Kent, OH		W 33–25	13,352
October 1	2:00 pm	at Ohio	Peden Stadium; Athens, OH		L 10–17	17,155
October 8	3:30 pm	at Northern Illinois	Huskie Stadium; DeKalb, IL		L 10–40	14,251
October 15	3:30 pm	Miami (OH)^{†}	Dix Stadium; Kent, OH		L 3–9	15,245
October 29	1:00 pm	Bowling Green	Dix Stadium; Kent, OH		W 27–15	10,152
November 4	6:00 pm	Central Michigan	Dix Stadium; Kent, OH	ESPN2	W 24–21	10,132
November 12	2:00 pm	at Akron	InfoCision Stadium – Summa Field; Akron, OH		W 35–3	19,889
November 19	1:00 pm	Eastern Michigan	Dix Stadium; Kent, OH		W 28–22	12,944
November 25	12:00 pm	at Temple	Lincoln Financial Field; Philadelphia, PA		L 16–34	16,368
*Non-conference game; ^{†}Homecoming; Rankings from Coaches' Poll released prior to the game; All times are in Eastern time
