= 2011 Northern Illinois Huskies football team =

American college football season

2011 Northern Illinois Huskies football

MAC champion MAC West Division co-champion GoDaddy.com Bowl champion

MAC Championship Game, W 23–20 vs. Ohio

GoDaddy.com Bowl, W 38–20 vs. Arkansas State
- Conference: Mid-American Conference
- West
- Record: 11–3 (7–1 MAC)
- Head coach: Dave Doeren (1st season)
- Offensive coordinator: Matt Canada (1st season)
- Offensive scheme: Multiple
- Defensive coordinator: Jay Niemann (1st season)
- Base defense: 4–3
- MVP: Chandler Harnish
- Captains: Chandler Harnish; Trevor Olson; Sean Progar; Pat Schiller
- Home stadium: Huskie Stadium

2011 Mid-American Conference football standings
	Conf.			Overall
Team	W		L	W		L
East Division
Ohio xy	6	–	2	10	–	4
Temple	5	–	3	9	–	4
Kent State	4	–	4	5	–	7
Bowling Green	3	–	5	5	–	7
Miami (OH)	3	–	5	4	–	8
Buffalo	2	–	6	3	–	9
Akron	0	–	8	1	–	11
West Division
Northern Illinois xy$	7	–	1	11	–	3
Toledo x	7	–	1	9	–	4
Western Michigan	5	–	3	7	–	6
Ball State	4	–	4	6	–	6
Eastern Michigan	4	–	4	6	–	6
Central Michigan	2	–	6	3	–	9
Championship: Northern Illinois 23, Ohio 20
$ – Conference champion; x – Division champion/co-champions; y – Championship game participant

The 2011 Northern Illinois Huskies football team represented Northern Illinois University as a member of the West Division of the Mid-American Conference (MAC) during the 2011 NCAA Division I FBS football season. Led by first-year head coach Dave Doeren, the Huskies compiled an overall record of 11–3 with a mark of 7–1 in conference play, sharing the MAC West Division title with Toledo. By virtue of their head-to-head win over Toledo, Northern Illinois advance to the MAC Championship Game, where the defeated Ohio to win the program's second MAC title. The Huskies were invited to the GoDaddy.com Bowl, where they beat Arkansas State. This was the fourth consecutive season in which Northern Illinois made a trip to a bowl game. The team played home games at Huskie Stadium in DeKalb, Illinois.

== Schedule ==
Date	Time	Opponent	Site	TV	Result	Attendance	Source
September 3	6:00 p.m.	Army*	Huskie Stadium; DeKalb, IL	ESPN3	W 49–26	17,003	
September 10	6:00 p.m.	at Kansas*	Memorial Stadium; Lawrence, KS	FCS	L 42–45	48,084	
September 17	2:30 p.m.	vs. No. 7 Wisconsin*	Soldier Field; Chicago, IL	ESPN3	L 7–49	41,068	
September 24	2:30 p.m.	Cal Poly*	Huskie Stadium; DeKalb, IL		W 47–30	14,321	
October 1	2:30 p.m.	at Central Michigan	Kelly/Shorts Stadium; Mount Pleasant, MI	ESPN3	L 41–48	16,539	
October 8	2:30 p.m.	Kent State	Huskie Stadium; DeKalb, IL		W 40–10	14,251	
October 15	2:30 p.m.	Western Michigan^{†}	Huskie Stadium; DeKalb, IL	CSNC	W 51–22	20,277	
October 22	11:00 a.m.	at Buffalo	University at Buffalo Stadium; Amherst, NY	ESPN Plus	W 31–30	13,370	
November 1	6:00 p.m.	at Toledo	Glass Bowl; Toledo, OH	ESPN2	W 63–60	19,004	
November 8	7:00 p.m.	at Bowling Green	Doyt Perry Stadium; Bowling Green, OH	ESPN2	W 45–14	13,752	
November 15	7:00 p.m.	Ball State	Huskie Stadium; DeKalb, IL (Bronze Stalk Trophy)	ESPNU	W 41–38	12,391	
November 25	10:00 a.m.	Eastern Michigan	Huskie Stadium; DeKalb, IL	ESPNU	W 18–12	15,111	
December 2	7:00 p.m.	vs. Ohio	Ford Field; Detroit, MI (MAC Championship Game)	ESPN2	W 23–20	13,052	
January 8, 2012	8:00 p.m.	vs. Arkansas State*	Ladd–Peebles Stadium; Mobile, AL (GoDaddy.com Bowl)	ESPN	W 38–20	38,734	
*Non-conference game; ^{†}Homecoming; Rankings from AP Poll released prior to the game; All times are in Central time

== Game summaries ==
=== Army ===
	1	2	3	4	Total
Black Knights	6	0	0	20	26
Huskies	14	21	14	0	49

=== Kansas ===
	1	2	3	4	Total
Huskies	7	14	14	7	42
Jayhawks	7	14	14	10	45

=== Wisconsin ===
	1	2	3	4	Total
#8 Badgers	14	14	14	7	49
Huskies	7	0	0	0	7

=== Cal Poly ===
	1	2	3	4	Total
Mustangs	0	7	10	13	30
Huskies	13	21	0	13	47

=== Central Michigan ===
	1	2	3	4	Total
Huskies	0	10	6	25	41
Chippewas	17	0	14	17	48

=== Kent State ===
	1	2	3	4	Total
Golden Flashes	3	0	0	7	10
Huskies	7	20	6	7	40

=== Western Michigan ===
	1	2	3	4	Total
Broncos	6	9	0	7	22
Huskies	0	13	24	14	51

=== Buffalo ===
	1	2	3	4	Total
Huskies	3	14	14	0	31
Bulls	3	7	0	20	30

=== Toledo ===
	1	2	3	4	Total
Huskies	21	7	14	21	63
Rockets	14	10	14	22	60

=== Bowling Green ===
	1	2	3	4	Total
Huskies	14	10	7	14	45
Falcons	7	7	0	0	14

=== Ball State ===
	1	2	3	4	Total
Cardinals	14	10	7	7	38
Huskies	0	14	14	13	41

=== Eastern Michigan ===
	1	2	3	4	Total
Eagles	3	0	3	6	12
Huskies	7	5	6	0	18

=== Ohio (2011 MAC Championship Game) ===
	1	2	3	4	Total
Bobcats	10	10	0	0	20
Huskies	0	0	7	16	23

=== Arkansas State (2012 GoDaddy.com Bowl) ===
	1	2	3	4	Total
Red Wolves	13	0	0	7	20
Huskies	7	14	7	10	38

== Statistics ==
=== Points by quarter ===
	1	2	3	4	Total
Northern Illinois	93	149	119	114	475
Opponents	94	78	76	136	384
