= 2011 Ball State Cardinals football team =

American college football season

2011 Ball State Cardinals football
- Conference: Mid-American Conference
- West
- Record: 6–6 (4–4 MAC)
- Head coach: Pete Lembo (1st season)
- Offensive coordinator: Rich Skrosky (1st season)
- Offensive scheme: Multiple
- Defensive coordinator: Jay Bateman (1st season)
- Base defense: 3–4
- Home stadium: Scheumann Stadium

2011 Mid-American Conference football standings
	Conf.			Overall
Team	W		L	W		L
East Division
Ohio xy	6	–	2	10	–	4
Temple	5	–	3	9	–	4
Kent State	4	–	4	5	–	7
Bowling Green	3	–	5	5	–	7
Miami (OH)	3	–	5	4	–	8
Buffalo	2	–	6	3	–	9
Akron	0	–	8	1	–	11
West Division
Northern Illinois xy$	7	–	1	11	–	3
Toledo x	7	–	1	9	–	4
Western Michigan	5	–	3	7	–	6
Ball State	4	–	4	6	–	6
Eastern Michigan	4	–	4	6	–	6
Central Michigan	2	–	6	3	–	9
Championship: Northern Illinois 23, Ohio 20
$ – Conference champion; x – Division champion/co-champions; y – Championship game participant

The 2011 Ball State Cardinals football team represented Ball State University in the 2011 NCAA Division I FBS football season. The Cardinals were led by first-year head coach Pete Lembo and played their home games at Scheumann Stadium. They were a member of the West Division of the Mid-American Conference. They finished the season 6–6, 4–4 in MAC play to finish in a tie for fourth place in the West Division.

== Schedule ==
Date	Time	Opponent	Site	TV	Result	Attendance
September 3	7:00 pm	vs. Indiana*	Lucas Oil Stadium; Indianapolis, IN	ESPN3	W 27–20	40,224
September 10	7:00 pm	at No. 22 South Florida*	Raymond James Stadium; Tampa, FL		L 7–37	45,113
September 17	7:00 pm	Buffalo	Scheumann Stadium; Muncie, IN		W 28–25	8,964
September 24	2:00 pm	Army*	Scheumann Stadium; Muncie, IN	ESPN3	W 48–21	15,288
October 1	7:00 pm	at No. 2 Oklahoma*	Gaylord Family Oklahoma Memorial Stadium; Norman, OK		L 6–62	84,921
October 8	2:00 pm	Temple^{†}	Scheumann Stadium; Muncie, IN		L 0–42	11,874
October 15	3:30 pm	at Ohio	Peden Stadium; Athens, OH		W 23–20	23,146
October 22	2:00 pm	Central Michigan	Scheumann Stadium; Muncie, IN		W 31–27	7,160
October 29	2:00 pm	at Western Michigan	Waldo Stadium; Kalamazoo, MI		L 35–45	16,548
November 5	12:00 pm	at Eastern Michigan	Rynearson Stadium; Ypsilanti, MI	ESPN3	W 33–31	3,288
November 15	7:00 pm	at Northern Illinois	Huskie Stadium; DeKalb, IL (Battle for the Bronze Stalk)	ESPNU	L 38–41	12,391
November 25	2:00 pm	Toledo	Scheumann Stadium; Muncie, IN	ESPNU	L 28–45	6,873
*Non-conference game; ^{†}Homecoming; Rankings from AP Poll released prior to the game; All times are in Eastern time

== Roster ==
2011 Ball State Cardinals football roster
Quarterbacks: 5 Kelly Page - (redshirt) Junior; 10 Keith Wenning -Sophomore; 16 Brooks Medaris - (redshirt) Sophomore; 19 Taylor Bockrath -Freshman; Running backs: 4 Horactio Banks -Freshman; 7 Cory Sykes -Senior; 21 David Jones - (redshirt) Sophomore; 33 Barrington Scott - (redshirt) Sophomore; 38 Jahwan Edwards -Freshman; 39 Nick Najem - (redshirt) Freshman; 45 Dwayne Donigan - (redshirt) Junior; -- Toney Williams -Junior; Fullbacks: 35 Keenan Noel -Freshman; Wide receivers: 1 Briggs Orsbon -Senior (C); 2 Jared Scaringe - (redshirt) Freshman; 2 Jamill Smith - (redshirt) Sophomore; 3 Willie Snead IV -Freshman; 6 Dion Lewis - (redshirt) Freshman; 12 Torieal Gibson -Senior; 28 Richard Saint-Victor -Senior; 80 Chris Shillings -Freshman; 81 Connor Ryan- (redshirt) Sophomore; 82 Shane Belle - (redshirt) Freshman; 83 Trey Gardner -Freshman; 85 Jack Tomlinson -Sophomore; 86 Ryan Summers - (redshirt) Freshman; 87 Jacolby Owens -Freshman; Tight ends: 11 Aaron Mershman - (redshirt) Sophomore; 40 Dylan Curry -Freshman; 43 Jacob Green - (redshirt) Sophomore; 84 Derek Orr - (redshirt) Freshman; 88 Zane Fakes - (redshirt) Sophomore; 89 David Schneider -Sophomore	Offensive line: 54 Jerrod Gray - (redshirt) Senior; 61 Taylor Hoke - (redshirt) Freshman; 63 Chris Sparrow -Junior; 64 David Raffin - (redshirt) Freshman; 65 Jalen Schlachter -Freshman; 66 Kreg Hunter - (redshirt) Senior (C); 70 Jordan Hansel -Sophomore; 71 Bryan Ford -Freshman; 72 Cameron Lowry - (redshirt) Junior; 73 Dan Manick - (redshirt) Junior; 74 Tyler Rayburn -Freshman; 75 Matthew Page - (redshirt) Sophomore; 76 Rayondon Kennedy - (redshirt) Senior; 77 Austin Holtz - (redshirt) Junior; 78 Kevin Gall - (redshirt) Senior; 79 Kitt O'Brien -Junior; Linebackers: 8 Travis Freeman -Junior; 15 Aaron Morris -Sophomore; 17 Zac Jordan - (redshirt) Senior; 26 Avery Bailey -Freshman; 32 Lorren Womack - (redshirt) Senior; 42 Julian Boyd -Freshman; 46 Michael Ayers -Freshman; 47 Tony Martin -Junior; 48 Justin Cruz -Junior; 50 Trent Toothman -Freshman; 51 Steve Spence -Senior; 53 Ben Ingle -Freshman; -- Jonathan Newsome -Junior; Defensive ends: 41 Andrew Puthoff - (redshirt) Senior (C); 44 Ryan Hartke - (redshirt) Senior; 52 Nick Miles -Freshman; 56 Anthony Kukwa -Freshman; 91 Chris Hinton - (redshirt) Sophomore; 95 Matt Fox -Freshman	Defensive tackles: 90 Harold Hogue - (redshirt) Sophomore; 92 Nathan Ollie -Sophomore; 93 Joel Cox -Sophomore; 97 Donovan Jarrett -Junior; 98 Ian Anderson -Freshman; 99 Adam Morris -Senior (C); Cornerbacks: 6 Jason Pinkston -Junior; 13 Armand Dehaney -Junior; 16 Curtez Hawkins - (redshirt) Freshman; 21 Keith Lee -Sophomore; 22 Quinton Cooper -Sophomore; 24 Jeffery Garrett -Sophomore; 27 Kendall Moore - (redshirt) Sophomore; 28 Andre Dawson - (redshirt) Junior; 34 Odis Prunty -Sophomore; 36 Eric Patterson -Freshman; Safeties: 20 Joshua Howard -Senior; 23 Kyle Hoke -Senior; 25 Sean Baker - (redshirt) Senior (C); 29 Brian Jones - (redshirt) Freshman; 30 J.C. Wade - (redshirt) Freshman; 37 Christopher Calloway -Freshman; 39 Brandon Kish - (redshirt) Sophomore; 49 Joseph Fazio - (redshirt) Sophomore; 58 Kenneth Lee -Junior	Punters: 18 Scott Kovanda - (redshirt) Junior; 44 Augustus Ervin - (redshirt) Freshman; Place kickers: 14 Steven Schott - (redshirt) Junior; 31 Scott Secor - (redshirt) Freshman; Long snappers: 57 Garrett Mack - (redshirt) Freshman; Head coach: Pete Lembo; Coordinators/Assistant coaches: Rich Skrosky – Offensive coordinator/quarterbacks coach; Jay Bateman – Defensive coordinator/linebackers coach; Justin lustig – Special teams coordinator/running backs coach; Keith Gaither – Wide receivers coach; John Strollo – Offensive line coach; Joey Lynch – Tight ends coach/recruiting coordinator; Chad Wilt – Defensive line coach; Terry lantz – Safeties coach; Darryl dixon – Defensive backs coach; Tim Kelly – Graduate assistant
