= 2011 Akron Zips football team =

American college football season

2011 Akron Zips football
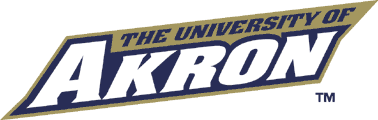
- Conference: Mid-American Conference
- East
- Record: 1–11 (0–8 MAC)
- Head coach: Rob Ianello (2nd season)
- Offensive coordinator: John Latina (2nd season)
- Defensive coordinator: Kevin Cosgrove (1st season)
- Home stadium: InfoCision Stadium–Summa Field

2011 Mid-American Conference football standings
	Conf.			Overall
Team	W		L	W		L
East Division
Ohio xy	6	–	2	10	–	4
Temple	5	–	3	9	–	4
Kent State	4	–	4	5	–	7
Bowling Green	3	–	5	5	–	7
Miami (OH)	3	–	5	4	–	8
Buffalo	2	–	6	3	–	9
Akron	0	–	8	1	–	11
West Division
Northern Illinois xy$	7	–	1	11	–	3
Toledo x	7	–	1	9	–	4
Western Michigan	5	–	3	7	–	6
Ball State	4	–	4	6	–	6
Eastern Michigan	4	–	4	6	–	6
Central Michigan	2	–	6	3	–	9
Championship: Northern Illinois 23, Ohio 20
$ – Conference champion; x – Division champion/co-champions; y – Championship game participant

The 2011 Akron Zips football team represented the University of Akron in the 2011 NCAA Division I FBS football season. The Zips were led by second-year head coach Rob Ianello and played their home games at InfoCision Stadium – Summa Field. They are a member of the East Division of the Mid-American Conference. They finished the season 1–11, 0–8 in MAC play to finish in last place in the East Division. This was the Zips second consecutive 1–11 season.

Following the season, Ianello was fired after going 2–22 in two seasons.

== Schedule ==
Date	Time	Opponent	Site	TV	Result	Attendance
September 3	Noon	at No. 18 Ohio State*	Ohio Stadium; Columbus, OH	ESPN	L 0–42	105,001
September 10	6:00 p.m.	Temple	InfoCision Stadium; Akron, OH	ESPN3	L 3–41	15,156
September 17	3:30 p.m.	at Cincinnati*	Nippert Stadium; Cincinnati, OH	ESPN3	L 14–59	24,991
September 24	2:00 p.m.	VMI*	InfoCision Stadium; Akron, OH		W 36–13	14,257
October 1	1:00 p.m.	at Eastern Michigan	Rynearson Stadium; Ypsilanti, MI		L 23–31	3,375
October 8	2:00 p.m.	Florida International*^{†}	InfoCision Stadium; Akron, OH		L 17–27	16,016
October 22	3:30 p.m.	Ohio	InfoCision Stadium; Akron, OH		L 20–37	14,760
October 29	Noon	Central Michigan	InfoCision Stadium; Akron, OH	ESPN3	L 22–23	14,327
November 3	7:30 p.m.	at Miami (OH)	Yager Stadium; Oxford, OH	ESPNU	L 3–35	12,968
November 12	2:00 p.m.	Kent State	InfoCision Stadium; Akron, OH (Battle for the Wagon Wheel)		L 3–35	19,889
November 19	Noon	at Buffalo	University at Buffalo Stadium; Amherst, NY		L 10–51	14,509
November 25	1:00 p.m.	at Western Michigan	Waldo Stadium; Kalamazoo, MI		L 19–68	16,582
*Non-conference game; ^{†}Homecoming; Rankings from AP Poll released prior to the game; All times are in Eastern time
