= 2011 Eastern Michigan Eagles football team =

American college football season

2011 Eastern Michigan Eagles football
- Conference: Mid-American Conference
- West
- Record: 6–6 (4–4 MAC)
- Head coach: Ron English (3rd season)
- Offensive coordinator: Ken Karcher (3rd season)
- Offensive scheme: Multiple
- Defensive coordinator: Phil Snow (2nd season)
- Base defense: 4–3
- Home stadium: Rynearson Stadium

2011 Mid-American Conference football standings
	Conf.			Overall
Team	W		L	W		L
East Division
Ohio xy	6	–	2	10	–	4
Temple	5	–	3	9	–	4
Kent State	4	–	4	5	–	7
Bowling Green	3	–	5	5	–	7
Miami (OH)	3	–	5	4	–	8
Buffalo	2	–	6	3	–	9
Akron	0	–	8	1	–	11
West Division
Northern Illinois xy$	7	–	1	11	–	3
Toledo x	7	–	1	9	–	4
Western Michigan	5	–	3	7	–	6
Ball State	4	–	4	6	–	6
Eastern Michigan	4	–	4	6	–	6
Central Michigan	2	–	6	3	–	9
Championship: Northern Illinois 23, Ohio 20
$ – Conference champion; x – Division champion/co-champions; y – Championship game participant

The 2011 Eastern Michigan Eagles football team represented Eastern Michigan University during the 2011 NCAA Division I FBS football season. Eastern Michigan competed as a member of the Mid-American Conference (MAC) West Division, were coached by Ron English, and played their homes game at Rynearson Stadium. They finished the season 6–6, 4–4 in MAC play to finish in a tie for fourth place in the West Division. Despite being 6–6, the Eagles were not bowl eligible because two of their wins came against FCS teams. The 6 wins were the most wins the school had since 1995 when they also had 6 wins.

== Before the season ==
=== Previous season ===
The Eagles posted a 2–10 record in 2010, Ron English's second season as head coach, losing all four non-conference games and stretching their losing streak to 18 games before winning an overtime game at Ball State and another game at Buffalo in the latter part of the season.

=== Personnel ===
Name	Position	Year at EMU	Alma Mater
Ron English	Head coach	3rd	California
Ken Karcher	Assistant head coach/Offensive coordinator/quarterbacks coach	3rd	Tulane
Phil Snow	Defensive coordinator/defensive backs coach	2nd	Cal-State Hayward
Kurt Anderson	Running Game Coord./offensive line	4th	Michigan
Tom Burpee	Tight ends coach/special teams coordinator	3rd	Michigan
Ken Delgado	Defensive line coach	2nd	San Jose St.
Doug Downing	Recruiting coordinator/running backs coach	2nd	Purdue
Deon Maddox	Wide receivers coach	2nd	Syracuse
Steve Morrison	Linebackers coach	2nd	Michigan

=== Pre-season expectations ===
In the 2011 Mid-American Conference media poll, the Eagles were picked to finish in last place in the West Division, where they finished the past two seasons.

== Post-season honors ==
Following the 2011 Mid-American Conference football season, five players were named to All-MAC teams, the most for EMU since 1996, though none were named to the first team. Senior defensive lineman Brad Ohrman was named to the second team, while sixth-year senior defensive back Latarrius Thomas, junior tight end Garrett Hoskins, junior linebacker Justin Cudworth, and sophomore defensive back Marlon Pollard were all named to the third team. After leading the Eagles to their winningest season in 15 years, Ron English was named the MAC Coach of the Year.

Senior offensive lineman Bridger Buche and senior defensive lineman Brad Ohrman are considered the top pro prospects from the team.

== Schedule ==
Date	Time	Opponent	Site	TV	Result	Attendance
September 4	12:00 pm	Howard*	Rynearson Stadium; Ypsilanti, MI		W 41–9	3,563
September 10	1:00 pm	Alabama State*	Rynearson Stadium; Ypsilanti, MI		W 14–7	4,771
September 17	12:00 pm	at Michigan*	Michigan Stadium; Ann Arbor, MI	BTN	L 3–31	110,343
September 24	12:00 pm	at Penn State*	Beaver Stadium; University Park, PA	ESPN2	L 6–34	95,636
October 1	1:00 pm	Akron	Rynearson Stadium; Ypsilanti, MI		W 31–23	3,375
October 8	3:00 pm	at Toledo	Glass Bowl; Toledo, OH		L 16–54	22,909
October 15	3:00 pm	at Central Michigan	Kelly/Shorts Stadium; Mount Pleasant, MI (rivalry)		W 35–28	17,158
October 22	1:00 pm	Western Michigan^{†}	Rynearson Stadium; Ypsilanti, MI (Michigan MAC Trophy)		W 14–10	6,772
November 5	12:00 pm	Ball State	Rynearson Stadium; Ypsilanti, MI	ESPN3	L 31–33	3,288
November 12	1:00 pm	Buffalo	Rynearson Stadium; Ypsilanti, MI		W 30–17	4,994
November 19	1:00 pm	at Kent State	Dix Stadium; Kent, OH		L 22–28	12,944
November 25	11:00 am	at Northern Illinois	Huskie Stadium; DeKalb, IL	ESPNU	L 12–18	15,111
*Non-conference game; ^{†}Homecoming; All times are in Eastern time

== Game summaries ==
=== Howard ===
	1	2	3	4	Total
Bison	9	0	0	0	9
Eagles	3	24	7	7	41

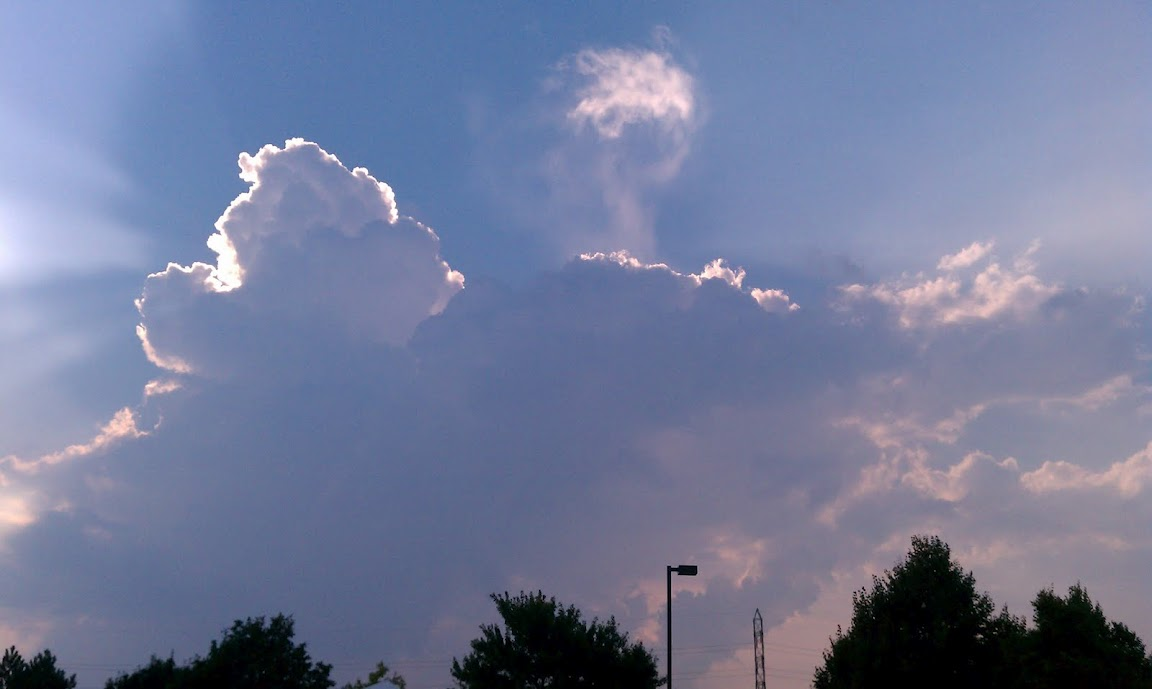
Storms forced the postponement of the opening game from September 3 to September 4.

EMU's opening game was originally scheduled for 7 pm on Saturday, September 3. Due to severe storms in the area, which caused problems at football games throughout the Midwest, including the cancellation of the Western Michigan at University of Michigan game near the end of the third quarter, the kickoff was first postponed until 8:30 p.m., then to 9:30 p.m., and finally to noon on Sunday, with free admission offered. After a slow start by the EMU offense, which saw junior quarterback Alex Gillett throw an interception returned for a touchdown on the Eagles' first offensive play, EMU took charge of the game in the second quarter, scoring touchdowns on four of their next five drives while holding Howard to just 13 net yards on their next six possessions. EMU's offense was led by running backs Dominique Sherrer and Javonti Greene, each gained 120 yards and a touchdown in 14 carries, while Justin Cudworth led EMU's defense with 13 tackles, a sack, and a forced fumble.

Scoring summary

1st quarter

- 10:54 Howard – Julien David 29-yard interception return (two-point conversion failed) 0–6 Howard
- 7:43 EMU – Kody Fulkerson 45-yard field goal 3–6 Howard
- 2:23 Howard – Parker Munoz 39-yard field goal 3–9 Howard

2nd quarter

- 14:53 EMU – Kody Fulkerson 31-yard field goal 6–9 Howard
- 11:31 EMU – Garrett Hoskins 25-yard pass from Alex Gillett (Kody Fulkerson kick) 13–9 EMU
- 1:31 EMU – Javonti Greene 1-yard run (Kody Fulkerson kick) 20–9 EMU
- 0:56 EMU – Alex Gillett 14-yard run (Kody Fulkerson kick) 27–9 EMU

3rd quarter

- 14:05 EMU – Dominique Sherrer 77-yard run (Kody Fulkerson kick) 34–9 EMU

4th quarter

- 3:13 EMU – Joe Fleming 9-yard pass from Alex Gillett (Kody Fulkerson kick) 41–9 EMU

=== Alabama State ===
	1	2	3	4	Total
Hornets	0	0	7	0	7
Eagles	7	0	7	0	14

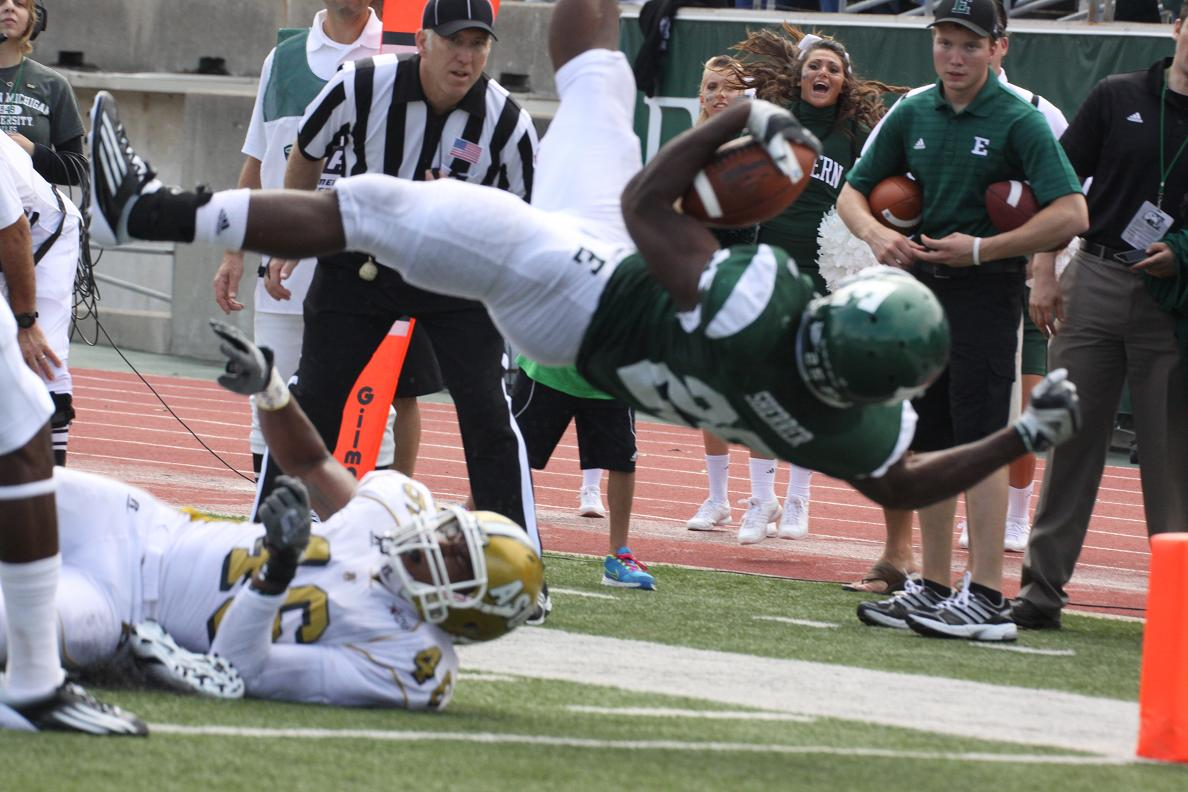
Dominique Sherrer scored a leaping touchdown for EMU in the third quarter.

Scoring summary

1st quarter

- 2:47 EMU – Nick Olds 13-yard pass from Alex Gillett (Kody Fulkerson kick) 7–0 EMU

2nd quarter
None

3rd quarter

- 11:42 EMU – Dominique Sherrer 6-yard run (Kody Fulkerson kick) 14–0 EMU
- 5:18 Alabama State – T.C. McWilliams 22-yard pass from Devin Dominguez (Bobby Wenzig kick) 14–7 EMU

4th quarter
None

=== At Michigan ===
	1	2	3	4	Total
Eagles	0	3	0	0	3
Wolverines	0	14	14	3	31

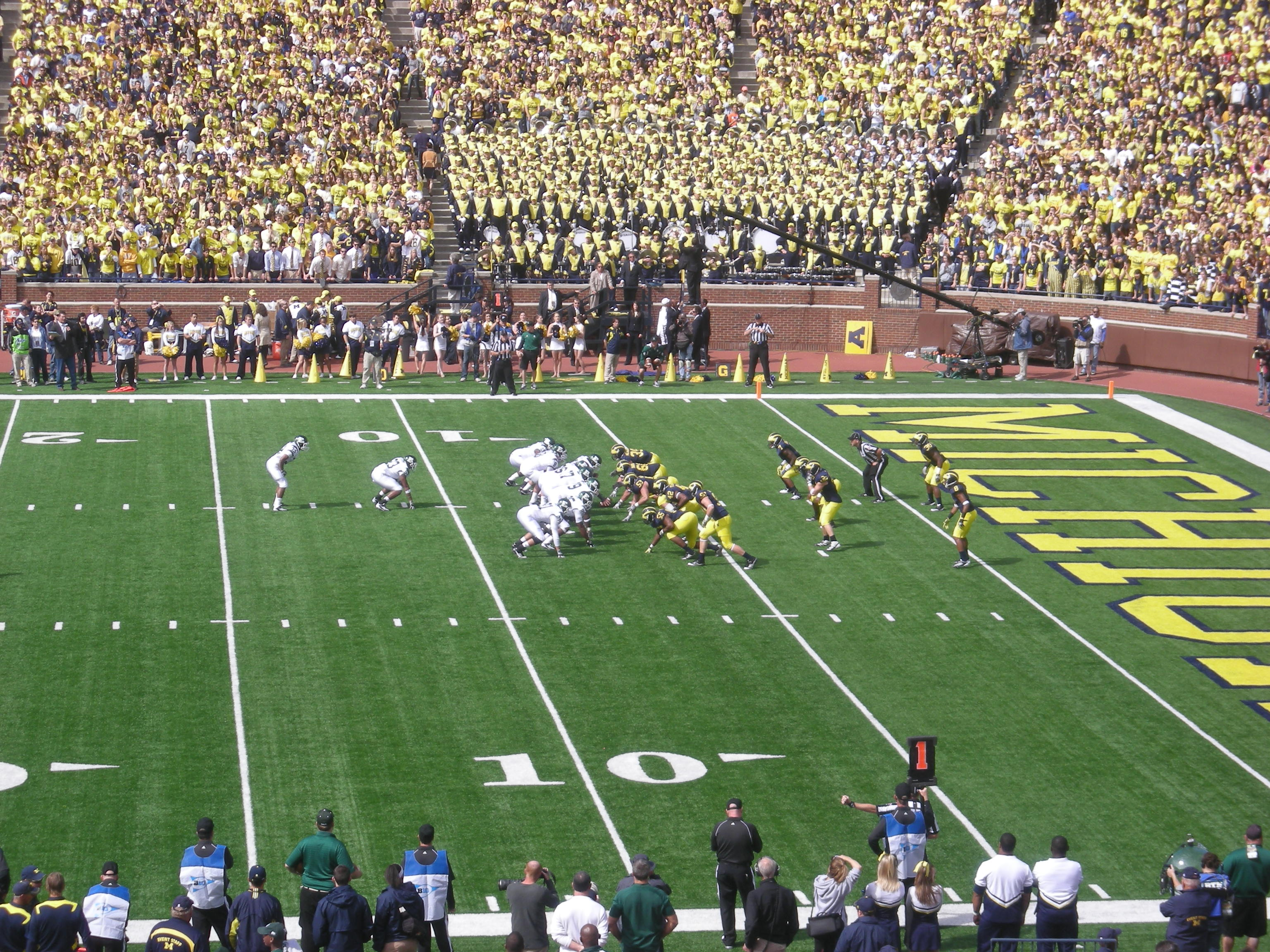
EMU drove inside the Michigan 10-yard line several times but was never able to reach the end zone.

Scoring summary

1st quarter
None

2nd quarter

- 14:55 EMU – Kody Fulkerson 21-yard field goal 3–0 EMU
- 9:28 Michigan – Kevin Koger 9-yard pass from Denard Robinson (Brendan Gibbons kick) 3–7 Michigan
- 0:39 Michigan – Denard Robinson 11-yard run (Brendan Gibbons kick) 3–14 Michigan

3rd quarter

- 9:17 Michigan – Fitzgerald Toussaint 1-yard run (Brendan Gibbons kick) 3–21 Michigan
- 1:05 Michigan – Drew Dileo 19-yard pass from Denard Robinson (Brendan Gibbons kick)3–28 Michigan

4th quarter

- 4:32 Michigan – Brendan Gibbons 21-yard field goal 3–31 Michigan

=== At Penn State ===
	1	2	3	4	Total
Eagles	0	0	0	6	6
Nittany Lions	3	14	14	3	34

Scoring summary

1st quarter

- 4:18 Penn State – Anthony Fera 29-yard field goal 0–3 Penn State

2nd quarter

- 8:19 Penn State – Joe Suhey 27-yard pass from Matt McGloin (Anthony Fera kick) 0–10 Penn State
- 0:56 Penn State – Derek Moye 5-yard pass from Matt McGloin (Anthony Fera kick) 0–17 Penn State

3rd quarter

- 13:59 Penn State – Devon Smith 71-yard pass from Rob Bolden (Anthony Fera kick) 0–24 Penn State
- 2:27 Penn State – Derek Moye 20-yard pass from Matt McGloin (Anthony Fera kick) 0–31 Penn State

4th quarter

- 11:50 EMU – Kody Fulkerson 21-yard field goal 3–31 Penn State
- 8:32 Penn State – Sam Ficken 43-yard field goal 3–34 Penn State
- 3:04 EMU – Kody Fulkerson 22-yard field goal 6–34 Penn State

=== Akron ===
	1	2	3	4	Total
Zips	0	10	6	7	23
Eagles	7	10	7	7	31

EMU scored first and never trailed. The team was led by three touchdowns from walk-on running back Dominique White.

Scoring summary

1st quarter

- 4:56 – Dominque White 14-yard run (Kody Fulkerson kick) 7–0 EMU

2nd quarter

- 13:41 – Dominque White 1-yard run (Kody Fulkerson kick) 14–0 EMU
- 5:24 – Keith Sconiers 36-yard pass from Clayton Moore (T.J. Marchese kick) 14–7 EMU
- 1:57 – T.J. Marchese 29-yard field goal 14–10 EMU
- 0:00 – Kody Fulkerson 26-yard field goal 17–10 EMU

3rd quarter

- 12:45 – Dominque White 2-yard run (Kody Fulkerson kick)24–10 EMU
- 3:09 – Clayton Moore 8-yard pass from Jawon Chisholm (T.J. Marchese kick failed)24–16 EMU

4th quarter

- 12:43 – Alex Gillett 4-yard run (Kody Fulkerson kick) 31–16 EMU
- 3:18 – Jawon Chisholm 1-yard run (T.J. Marchese kick) 31–24 EMU

=== At Toledo ===
	1	2	3	4	Total
Eagles	0	9	0	7	16
Rockets	7	16	17	14	54

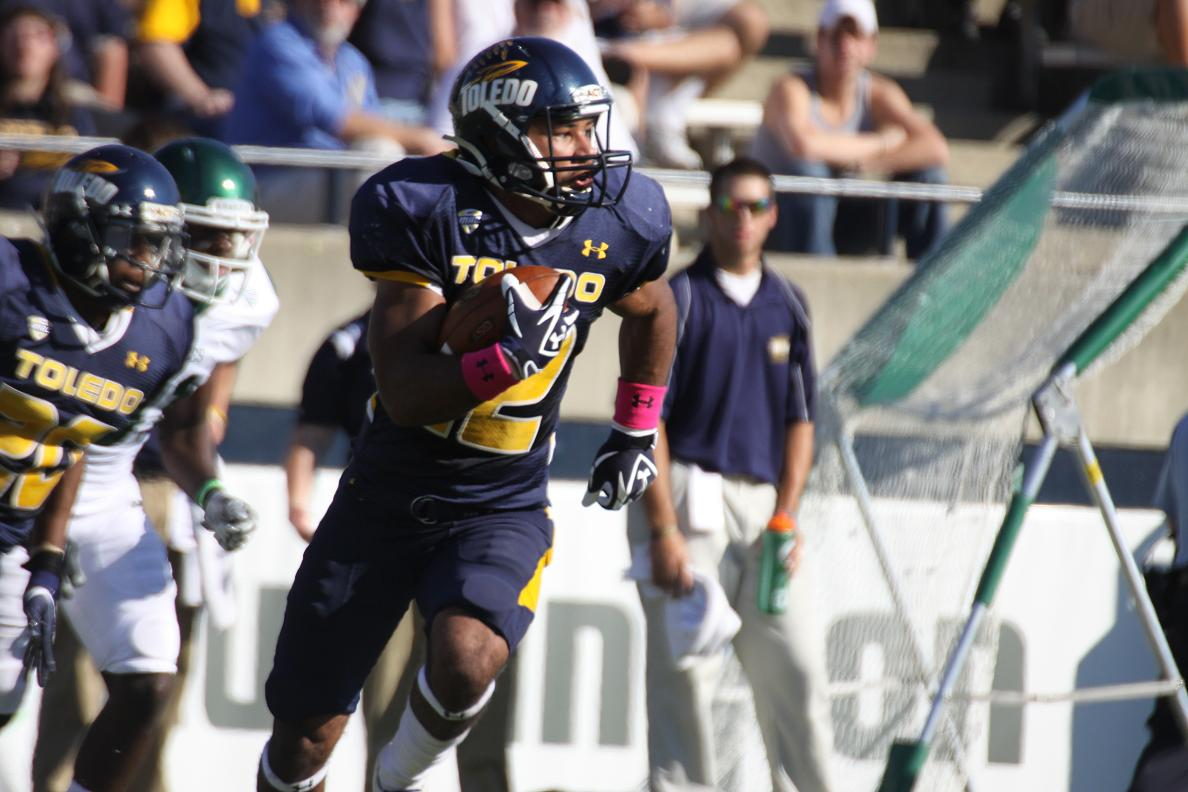
Toledo wide receiver Eric Page caught a touchdown and returned a punt for another touchdown.

Scoring summary

1st quarter

- 5:05 – Morgan Williams 19-yard pass from Austin Dantin (Ryan Casano kick) 0–7 Toledo

2nd quarter

- 10:00 – Bernard Reedy 55-yard pass from Terrance Owens (Ryan Casano kick) 0–14 Toledo
- 8:16 – Eric Page 85-yard punt return (Ryan Casano kick) 0–21 Toledo
- 3:37 – Kody Fulkerson 48-yard field goal 3–21 Toledo
- 1:22 – Kinsman Thomas 22-yard pass from Alex Gillett (Kody Fulkerson kick blocked) 9–21 Toledo
- 1:22 – Desmond Marrow off a blocked extra point kick 9–23 Toledo

3rd quarter

- 6:44 – Ryan Casano 19-yard field goal 9–26 Toledo
- 4:13 – Kenny Stafford 2-yard pass from Terrance Owens (Ryan Casano kick) 9–33 Toledo
- 0:28 – Eric Page 24-yard pass from Austin Dantin (Ryan Casano kick) 9–40 Toledo

4th quarter

- 13:59 – Morgan Williams 1-yard run (Ryan Casano kick) 9–47 Toledo
- 10:11 – Dominque White 3-yard run (Kody Fulkerson kick) 16–47 Toledo
- 4:40 – David Pasquale 3-yard run (Ryan Casano kick) 16–54 Toledo

=== At Central Michigan ===
	1	2	3	4	Total
Eagles	7	0	7	21	35
Chippewas	3	3	7	15	28

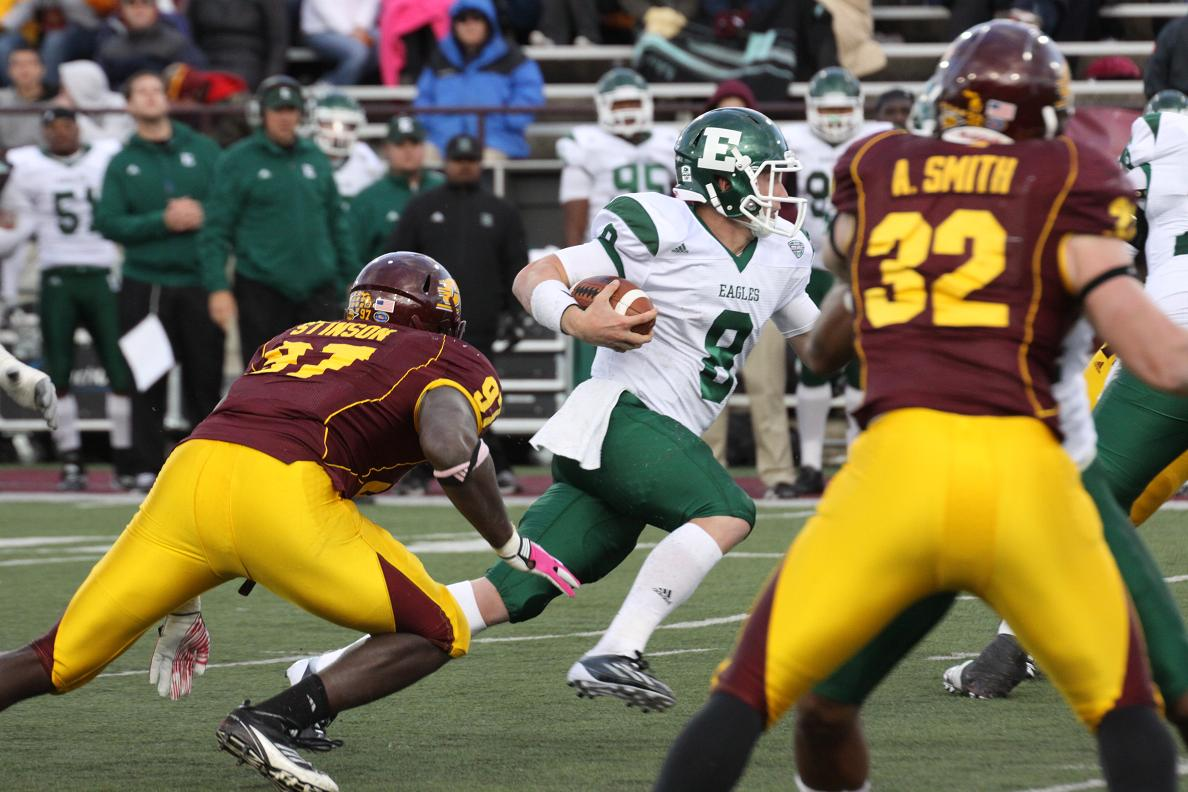
Alex Gillett ran 30 yards up the middle for a game-winning touchdown with 37 seconds remaining.

Scoring summary

1st quarter

- 5:18 David Harman 28-yard field goal 0–3 Central Michigan
- 0:30 Dominque White 1-yard run (Kody Fulkerson kick) 7–3 EMU

2nd quarter

- 5:26 David Harman 40-yard field goal 7–6 EMU

3rd quarter

- 11:13 Javonti Greene 36-yard run (Kody Fulkerson kick) 14–6 EMU
- 6:33 David Blackburn 8-yard pass from Ryan Radcliff (David Harman kick) 14–13 EMU

4th quarter

- 14:27 Javonti Greene 2-yard run (Kody Fulkerson kick) 21–13 EMU
- 12:34 Javonti Greene 5-yard run (Kody Fulkerson kick) 28–13 EMU
- 3:36 Titus Davis 11-yard pass from Ryan Radcliff (David Harman kick) 28–20
- 1:09 Jerry Harris 2-yard pass from Ryan Radcliff (Ryan Radcliff pass to Titus Davis for two-point conversion) 28–28
- 0:37 Alex Gillett 30-yard run (Kody Fulkerson kick) 35–28

=== Western Michigan ===
	1	2	3	4	Total
Broncos	0	0	7	3	10
Eagles	0	7	0	7	14

Scoring summary

1st quarter
None

2nd quarter

- 11:13 – Javonti Greene 50-yard pass from Alex Gillett (Kody Fulkerson kick) 7–0 EMU

3rd quarter

- 12:25 – Tevin Drake 46-yard run (John Potter kick) 7–7

4th quarter

- 10:59 – John Potter 37-yard field goal 7–10 Western Michigan
- 7:46 – Javonti Greene 50-yard run (Kody Fulkerson kick) 14–10 EMU

=== Ball State ===
	1	2	3	4	Total
Cardinals	14	6	7	6	33
Eagles	14	7	7	3	31

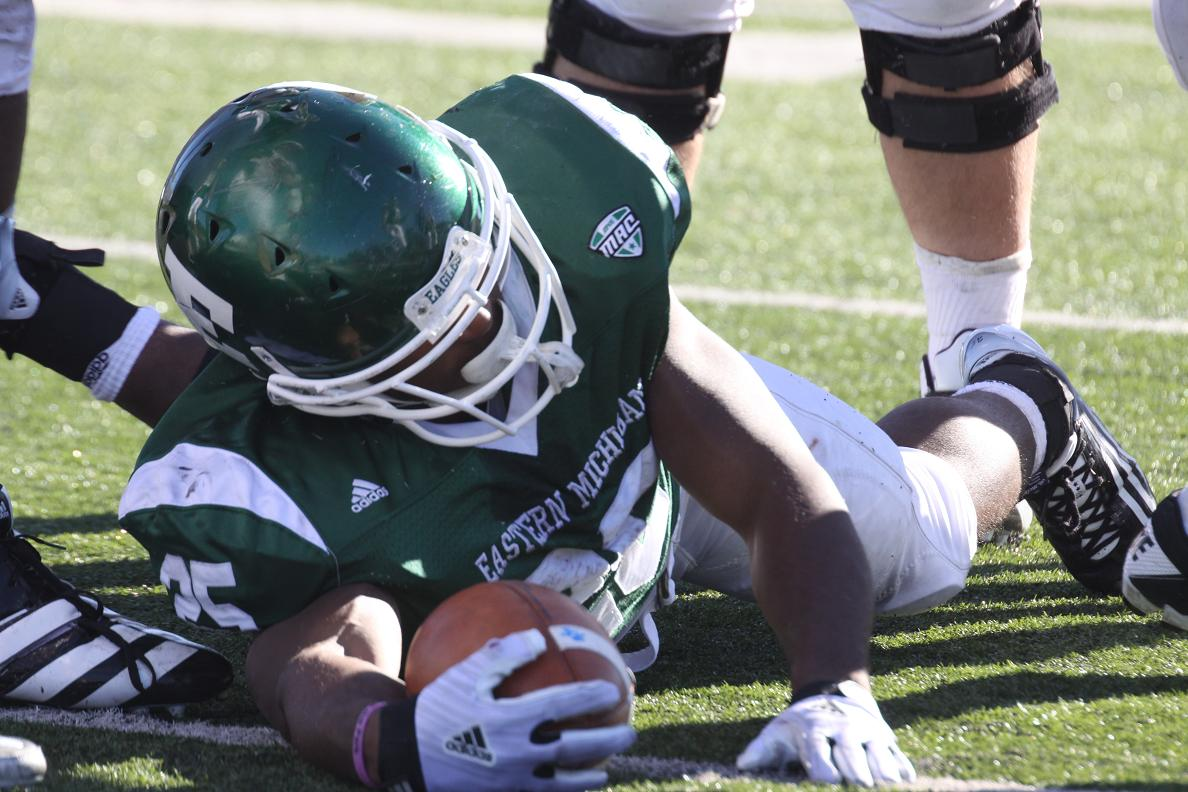

Scoring summary

1st quarter

- 9:38 Torieal Gibson 94-yard pass from Keith Wenning (Steven Schott kick) 0–7 Ball State
- 6:46 Trey Hunter 32-yard pass from Alex Gillett (Kody Fulkerson kick) 7–7
- 4:50 Barrington Scott 8-yard pass from Keith Wenning (Steven Schott kick) 7–14 Ball State
- 0:39 Nick Olds 42-yard pass from Alex Gillett (Kody Fulkerson kick) 14–14

2nd quarter

- 13:23 Steven Schott 31-yard field goal 14–17 Ball State
- 1:47 Tyreese Russell 14-yard pass from Alex Gillett (Kody Fulkerson kick) 21–17 EMU
- 1:08 Steven Schott 29-yard field goal 21–20 EMU

3rd quarter

- 9:39 Jahwan Edwards 15-yard run (Steven Schott kick) 21–27 Ball State
- 0:04 Tyreese Russell 16-yard pass from Alex Gillett (Kody Fulkerson kick) 28–27 EMU

4th quarter

- 6:52 Steven Schott 23-yard field goal 28–30 Ball State
- 1:18 Kody Fulkerson 20-yard field goal 31–30 EMU
- 0:09 Steven Schott 44-yard field goal 31–33 Ball State

=== Buffalo ===
	1	2	3	4	Total
Bulls	0	3	14	0	17
Eagles	3	6	14	7	30

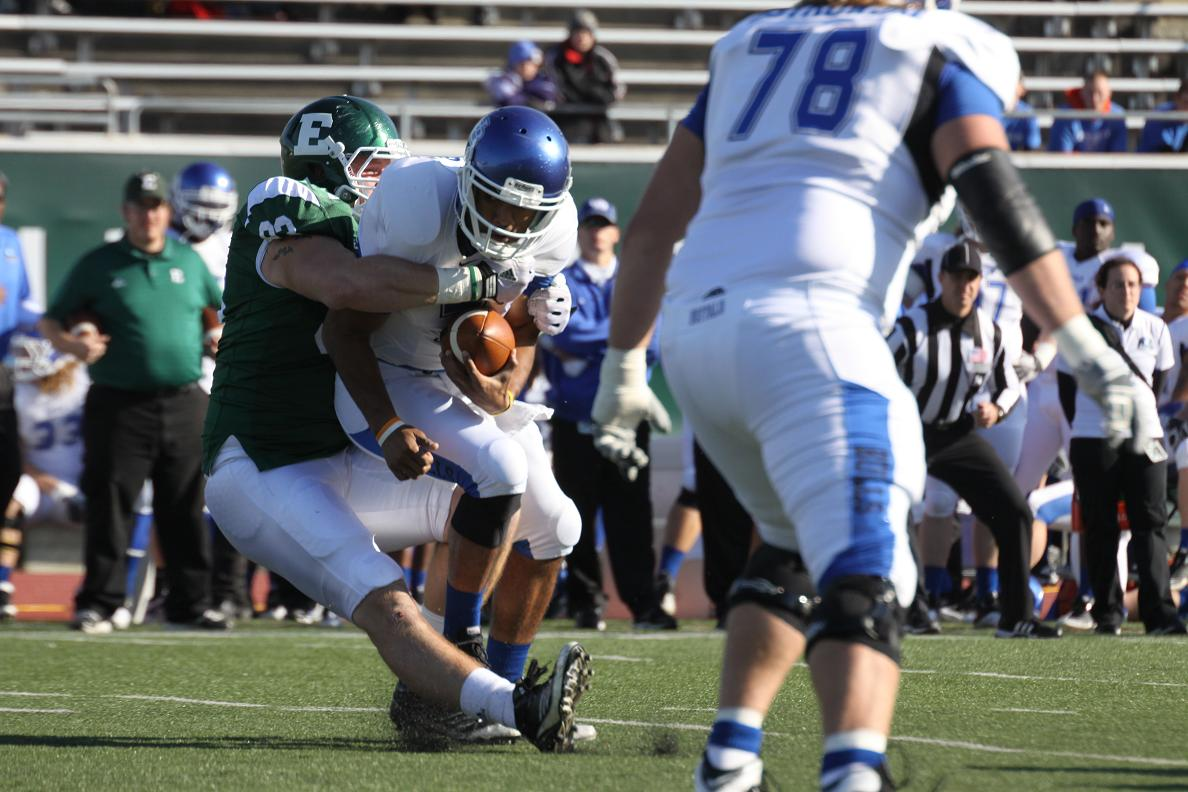

Scoring summary

1st quarter

- 7:04 Kody Fulkerson 39-yard field goal 3–0 EMU

2nd quarter

- 11:50 Garrett Hoskins 2-yard pass from Alex Gillett (Kody Fulkerson kick blocked) 9–0 EMU
- 0:04 Patrick Clarke 43-yard field goal 9–3 EMU

3rd quarter

- 8:59 Branden Oliver 3-yard run (Patrick Clarke kick) 9–10 Buffalo
- 8:00 Demarius Reed 67-yard pass from Alex Gillett (Kody Fulkerson kick) 16–10 EMU
- 6:35 Branden Oliver 68-yard run (Patrick Clarke kick) 16–17 Buffalo
- 2:24 Demarius Reed 11-yard pass from Alex Gillett (Kody Fulkerson kick)23–17 EMU

4th quarter

- 14:11 Garrett Hoskins 34-yard pass from Alex Gillett (Kody Fulkerson kick) 30–17 EMU

=== At Kent State ===
	1	2	3	4	Total
Eagles	13	0	6	3	22
Golden Flashes	0	14	6	8	28

Scoring summary

1st quarter

- 12:33 Kody Fulkerson 27-yard field goal 3–0 EMU
- 6:10 Kody Fulkerson 44-yard field goal 6–0 EMU
- 1:50 Javonti Greene 32-yard run (Kody Fulkerson kick) 13–0 EMU

2nd quarter

- 7:49 Trayion Durham 1-yard run (Freddy Cortez kick) 13–7 EMU
- 1:23 Spencer Keith 3-yard run (Freddy Cortez kick) 13–14 Kent State

3rd quarter

- 10:49 Demarius Reed 83-yard punt return (Pat Failed) 19–14 EMU
- 7:35 Freddy Cortez 35-yard field goal 19–17 EMU
- 2:27 Freddy Cortez 49-yard field goal 19–20 Kent State

4th quarter

- 12:59 Kody Fulkerson 40-yard field goal 22–20 EMU
- 6:40 Tyshon Goode 70-yard pass from Spencer Keith (Spencer Keith pass to Tyshon Goode for two-point conversion) 22–28 Kent State

=== At Northern Illinois ===
	1	2	3	4	Total
Eagles	3	0	3	6	12
Huskies	7	5	6	0	18

Scoring summary

1st quarter

- 10:17 Willie Clark 54-yard pass from Chandler Harnish (Mathew Sims kick) 0–7 Northern Illinois
- 0:11 Kody Fulkerson 20-yard field goal 3–7 Northern Illinois

2nd quarter

- 8:44 Dominique Sherrer tackled Sean Progar in end zone for a safety 3–9 Northern Illinois
- 4:44 Mathew Sims 39-yard field goal 3–12 Northern Illinois

3rd quarter

- 1:43 Kody Fulkerson 23-yard field goal 6–12 Northern Illinois
- 0:12 Chandler Harnish 68-yard run (two-point conversion failed) 6–18 Northern Illinois

4th quarter

- 6:19 Nick Olds 24-yard pass from Alex Gillett (two-point conversion failed) 12–18 Northern Illinois
