= 2011 Temple Owls football team =

American college football season

2011 Temple Owls football

New Mexico Bowl champion

New Mexico Bowl, W 37–15 vs. Wyoming
- Conference: Mid-American Conference
- East Division
- Record: 9–4 (5–3 MAC)
- Head coach: Steve Addazio (1st season)
- Offensive coordinator: Scot Loeffler (1st season)
- Defensive coordinator: Chuck Heater (1st season)
- Home stadium: Lincoln Financial Field

2011 Mid-American Conference football standings
	Conf.			Overall
Team	W		L	W		L
East Division
Ohio xy	6	–	2	10	–	4
Temple	5	–	3	9	–	4
Kent State	4	–	4	5	–	7
Bowling Green	3	–	5	5	–	7
Miami (OH)	3	–	5	4	–	8
Buffalo	2	–	6	3	–	9
Akron	0	–	8	1	–	11
West Division
Northern Illinois xy$	7	–	1	11	–	3
Toledo x	7	–	1	9	–	4
Western Michigan	5	–	3	7	–	6
Ball State	4	–	4	6	–	6
Eastern Michigan	4	–	4	6	–	6
Central Michigan	2	–	6	3	–	9
Championship: Northern Illinois 23, Ohio 20
$ – Conference champion; x – Division champion/co-champions; y – Championship game participant

The 2011 Temple Owls football team represented Temple University in the 2011 NCAA Division I FBS football season. The Owls were led by first-year head coach Steve Addazio and played their home games at Lincoln Financial Field. They played as a member of the East Division of the Mid-American Conference. They finished the season 9–4, 5–3 in MAC play to finish in second place in the East Division. They were invited to the New Mexico Bowl where they defeated Wyoming 37–15. It was the school's first bowl win since the 1979 Garden State Bowl. This was the Owls' last season as a member of the MAC as they re-joined the Big East Conference for football in 2012.

== Schedule ==
Date	Time	Opponent	Site	TV	Result	Attendance	Source
September 3	7:00 p.m.	No. 14 Villanova*	Lincoln Financial Field; Philadelphia, PA (Mayor's Cup)	ESPN3	W 42–7	32,368	
September 10	6:00 p.m.	at Akron	InfoCision Stadium–Summa Field; Akron, OH	ESPN3	W 41–3	15,156	
September 17	12:00 p.m.	Penn State*	Lincoln Financial Field; Philadelphia, PA	ESPN	L 10–14	57,323	
September 24	12:30 p.m.	at Maryland*	Byrd Stadium; College Park, MD	ACC Network	W 38–7	39,102	
October 1	12:00 p.m.	Toledo	Lincoln Financial Field; Philadelphia, PA	ESPN3	L 13–36	21,705	
October 8	2:00 p.m.	at Ball State	Scheumann Stadium; Muncie, IN		W 42–0	11,874	
October 15	1:00 p.m.	Buffalo^{†}	Lincoln Financial Field; Philadelphia, PA		W 34–0	25,820	
October 22	3:30 p.m.	at Bowling Green	Doyt Perry Stadium; Bowling Green, OH	ESPN3	L 10–13	12,056	
November 2	8:00 p.m.	at Ohio	Peden Stadium; Athens, OH	ESPN2	L 31–35	17,490	
November 9	8:00 p.m.	Miami (OH)	Lincoln Financial Field; Philadelphia, PA	ESPN2	W 24–21	17,050	
November 19	1:00 p.m.	Army*	Lincoln Financial Field; Philadelphia, PA	ESPN3	W 42–14	25,516	
November 25	12:00 p.m.	Kent State	Lincoln Financial Field; Philadelphia, PA		W 34–16	16,368	
December 17	2:00 p.m.	vs. Wyoming*	University Stadium; Albuquerque, NM (New Mexico Bowl)	ESPN	W 37–15	25,762	
*Non-conference game; ^{†}Homecoming; Rankings from The Sports Network Poll released prior to the game; All times are in Eastern time
