= 2011 Toledo Rockets football team =

American college football season

2011 Toledo Rockets football

MAC West Division co-champion Military Bowl champion

Military Bowl, W 42–41 vs Air Force
- Conference: Mid-American Conference
- West
- Record: 9–4 (7–1 MAC)
- Head coach: Tim Beckman (3rd season; regular season); Matt Campbell (interim; bowl game)
- Offensive coordinator: Matt Campbell (3rd season)
- Offensive scheme: Spread
- Co-defensive coordinators: Mike Ward (3rd season); Paul Nichols (3rd season)
- Base defense: 4–2–5
- Home stadium: Glass Bowl

2011 Mid-American Conference football standings
| | Conf. | | | Overall |
| Team | W | | L | W | | L |
|---|---|---|---|---|---|---|
East Division
| Ohio xy | 6 | – | 2 | 10 | – | 4 |
| Temple | 5 | – | 3 | 9 | – | 4 |
| Kent State | 4 | – | 4 | 5 | – | 7 |
| Bowling Green | 3 | – | 5 | 5 | – | 7 |
| Miami (OH) | 3 | – | 5 | 4 | – | 8 |
| Buffalo | 2 | – | 6 | 3 | – | 9 |
| Akron | 0 | – | 8 | 1 | – | 11 |
West Division
| Northern Illinois xy$ | 7 | – | 1 | 11 | – | 3 |
| Toledo x | 7 | – | 1 | 9 | – | 4 |
| Western Michigan | 5 | – | 3 | 7 | – | 6 |
| Ball State | 4 | – | 4 | 6 | – | 6 |
| Eastern Michigan | 4 | – | 4 | 6 | – | 6 |
| Central Michigan | 2 | – | 6 | 3 | – | 9 |
Championship: Northern Illinois 23, Ohio 20
$ – Conference champion; x – Division champion/co-champions; y – Championship game participant

The 2011 Toledo Rockets football team represented the University of Toledo during the 2011 NCAA Division I FBS football season. The Rockets were led by third-year head coach Tim Beckman during the regular season and new head coach Matt Campbell for their bowl game. They competed in the West Division of the Mid-American Conference and played their home games at the Glass Bowl. They finished the season 9–4, 7–1 in MAC play to be West Division co–champions with Northern Illinois. Due to their loss to Northern Illinois, they did not represent the division in the MAC Championship Game. They were invited to the Military Bowl where they defeated Air Force 42–41.

At the end of the regular season, head coach Tim Beckman resigned to become the new head coach at Illinois. Offensive coordinator Matt Campbell was named as Beckman's replacement and coached the Rockets in the Military Bowl. Beckman finished at Toledo with a three-year record of 21–16.

== Schedule ==
| Date | Time | Opponent | Site | TV | Result | Attendance |
|---|---|---|---|---|---|---|
| September 1 | 7:00 p.m. | No. 10 (FCS) New Hampshire* | Glass Bowl; Toledo, OH | ESPN3 | W 58–22 | 20,106 |
| September 10 | 12:00 p.m. | at No. 15 Ohio State* | Ohio Stadium; Columbus, OH | BTN | L 22–27 | 105,016 |
| September 16 | 8:00 p.m. | No. 4 Boise State* | Glass Bowl; Toledo, OH | ESPN | L 15–40 | 28,905 |
| September 24 | 12:00 p.m. | at Syracuse* | Carrier Dome; Syracuse, NY | Big East Network | L 30–33 ^{OT} | 39,116 |
| October 1 | 12:00 p.m. | at Temple | Lincoln Financial Field; Philadelphia, PA | ESPN3 | W 36–13 | 21,705 |
| October 8 | 3:00 p.m. | Eastern Michigan | Glass Bowl; Toledo, OH | | W 54–16 | 22,909 |
| October 15 | 12:00 p.m. | at Bowling Green | Doyt Perry Stadium; Bowling Green, OH (Battle of I-75) | ESPN3 | W 28–21 | 22,408 |
| October 22 | 7:00 p.m. | Miami (OH)^{†} | Glass Bowl; Toledo, OH | ESPN3 | W 49–28 | 25,910 |
| November 1 | 7:00 p.m. | Northern Illinois | Glass Bowl; Toledo, OH | ESPN2 | L 60–63 | 19,004 |
| November 8 | 8:00 p.m. | Western Michigan | Glass Bowl; Toledo, OH | ESPNU | W 66–63 | 16,107 |
| November 18 | 8:00 p.m. | at Central Michigan | Kelly/Shorts Stadium; Mt. Pleasant, MI | ESPNU | W 44–17 | 12,741 |
| November 25 | 2:00 p.m. | at Ball State | Scheumann Stadium; Muncie, IN | ESPNU | W 45–28 | 6,873 |
| December 28 | 4:30 p.m. | vs. Air Force* | Robert F. Kennedy Memorial Stadium; Washington, D.C. (Military Bowl) | ESPN | W 42–41 | 25,042 |
*Non-conference game; ^{†}Homecoming; Rankings from Coaches' Poll released prior to the game; All times are in Eastern time
