= Chazz Anderson =

American football player (born 1989)

Profile
- Position: Quarterback

Personal information
- Born: February 14, 1989 (age 37); Pickerington, Ohio, U.S.
- Listed height: 6 ft 1 in (1.85 m)
- Listed weight: 198 lb (90 kg)

Career information
- High school: Pickerington Central (OH)
- College: Cincinnati (2007–2010); Buffalo (2011)
- Stats at ESPN

Timothy Chazz Anderson (born February 14, 1989) is an American college football quarterback who played college football for the Cincinnati Bearcats and Buffalo Bulls.

== Early life ==
Anderson attended Pickerington Central in Pickerington, Ohio, where he compiled a 39–6 record as a starting quarterback, winning Ohio's Division II Player of the Year in 2006. He committed to Cincinnati to play for coach Brian Kelly.

== College career ==
=== Cincinnati ===
Anderson was redshirted as a freshman in 2007. He entered the 2008 season as the third-string quarterback behind Tony Pike and Dustin Grutza, but saw action after injuries to both quarterbacks ahead of him on the depth chart. Anderson made two starts for the Bearcats on the season, leading the team to a pair of victories over Marshall and Rutgers, before once again being assigned to backup duty after Pike returned from injury. In 2009, Anderson once again served as the third-string quarterback behind Pike and Zach Collaros, seeing only limited duty during the season. During the 2010 season, Anderson again served as the backup quarterback to Collaros, making one start on the season while Collaros was injured, a 31–7 loss to Syracuse that would prove to be Anderson's final start as a member of the Bearcats.

=== Buffalo ===
In July 2011, Anderson announced that he was transferring to Buffalo to play for coach Jeff Quinn, Brian Kelly's former offensive coordinator at Cincinnati. As a graduate senior transfer, he was able to play immediately for the Bulls. Anderson was named Buffalo's starting quarterback for the 2011 season in August 2011. He started all twelve games for the Bulls, passing for 2,454 yards and 11 touchdowns; however, the team only posted a 3–9 record on the season.
