= 2011 Bowling Green Falcons football team =

American college football season

2011 Bowling Green Falcons football
- Conference: Mid-American Conference
- East
- Record: 5–7 (3–5 MAC)
- Head coach: Dave Clawson (3rd season)
- Offensive coordinator: Warren Ruggiero (3rd season)
- Defensive coordinator: Mike Elko
- Home stadium: Doyt Perry Stadium

2011 Mid-American Conference football standings
	Conf.			Overall
Team	W		L	W		L
East Division
Ohio xy	6	–	2	10	–	4
Temple	5	–	3	9	–	4
Kent State	4	–	4	5	–	7
Bowling Green	3	–	5	5	–	7
Miami (OH)	3	–	5	4	–	8
Buffalo	2	–	6	3	–	9
Akron	0	–	8	1	–	11
West Division
Northern Illinois xy$	7	–	1	11	–	3
Toledo x	7	–	1	9	–	4
Western Michigan	5	–	3	7	–	6
Ball State	4	–	4	6	–	6
Eastern Michigan	4	–	4	6	–	6
Central Michigan	2	–	6	3	–	9
Championship: Northern Illinois 23, Ohio 20
$ – Conference champion; x – Division champion/co-champions; y – Championship game participant

The 2011 Bowling Green Falcons football team represented Bowling Green State University in the 2011 NCAA Division I FBS football season. The Falcons were led by third year head coach Dave Clawson and played their home games at Doyt Perry Stadium. They are a member of the East Division of the Mid-American Conference. They finished the season 5–7, 3–5 in MAC play to finish in a tie for fourth place in the East Division.

== Schedule ==
Date	Time	Opponent	Site	TV	Result	Attendance
September 1	9:00 pm	at Idaho*	Kibbie Dome; Moscow, ID	ALT	W 32–15	12,173
September 10	7:00 pm	Morgan State*	Doyt Perry Stadium; Bowling Green, OH	BCSN	W 58–13	15,206
September 17	12:00 pm	Wyoming*	Doyt Perry Stadium; Bowling Green, OH	BCSN	L 27–28	14,813
September 24	1:00 pm	at Miami (OH)	Yager Stadium; Oxford, OH	ESPN3	W 37–23	20,828
October 1	3:30 pm	at No. 22 West Virginia*	Mountaineer Field; Morgantown, WV	Big East Network	L 10–55	46,603
October 8	2:00 pm	at Western Michigan	Waldo Stadium; Kalamazoo, MI	STO	L 21–45	20,238
October 15	12:00 pm	Toledo	Doyt Perry Stadium; Bowling Green, OH (Battle of I-75)	ESPN+	L 21–28	22,408
October 22	3:30 pm	Temple	Doyt Perry Stadium; Bowling Green, OH	BCSN	W 13–10	12,056
October 29	1:00 pm	at Kent State	Dix Stadium; Kent, OH (Battle for the Anniversary Award)	MAC TV	L 15–27	10,152
November 8	8:00 pm	Northern Illinois	Doyt Perry Stadium; Bowling Green, OH	ESPN2	L 14–45	13,752
November 16	8:00 pm	Ohio	Doyt Perry Stadium; Bowling Green, OH	ESPN	L 28–29	11,804
November 25	12:00 pm	at Buffalo	University at Buffalo Stadium; Amherst, NY		W 42–28	12,262
*Non-conference game; Rankings from Coaches' Poll released prior to the game; All times are in Eastern time

== Game summaries ==
=== At Idaho Vandals ===
Bowling Green Falcons (0–0) at Idaho Vandals (0–0) – Game summary

Quarter	1	2	3	4	Total
Falcons	14	16	0	2	32
Vandals	7	0	0	8	15

at Kibbie Dome • Moscow, ID

- Date: September 1, 2011
- Game time: 6:00 p.m. EDT
- Game weather: Indoors
- Game attendance: 12,173
- Referee: Stacy Hardin
- TV announcers (ALT): Rich Winter (play-by-play) and Brant Boyer (analyst)

Game information

First quarter

- (12:45) IDAHO – Michael Lagrone 5-yard pass from Brian Reader (Trey Farguhar kick) (Drive: 6 plays, 78 yards, 2:25; Idaho 7-0)
- (07:38) BGSU – Eugene Cooper 76-yard pass from Matt Schilz (Kyle Burkhardt kick) (Drive: 1 play, 76 yards, :12; Tied 7-7)
- (01:33) BGSU – Eugene Cooper 24-yard pass from Matt Schilz (Kyle Burkhardt kick) (Drive: 10 plays, 80 yards, 4:13; Bowling Green 14-7)

Second quarter

- (14:54) BGSU – Jordan Hopgood 9-yard run (Kyle Burkhardt kick) (Drive: 2 plays, 71 yards, :28; Bowling Green 21-7)
- (11:10) BGSU – Anthon Samuel 1-yard run (Kyle Burkhardt kick failed) (Drive: 4 plays, 53 yards, 1:42; Bowling Green 27-7)
- (04:28) BGSU – Kyle Burkhardt 39-yard field goal (Drive: 9 plays, 61 yards, 5:36; Bowling Green 30-7)

Third quarter

- No scoring plays.

Fourth quarter

- (14:44) IDAHO – Armauni Johnson 25-yard pass from Brian Reader (Armauni Johnson Two-point pass) (Drive: 7 plays, 63 yards, 1:15; Bowling Green 30-15)
- (11:06) BGSU – Chris Jones 2-yard safety (Bowling Green 32-15)

Statistics	Bowling Green	Idaho
First downs	20	18
Plays–yards	80–478	65–280
Rushes–yards	48–187	21–52
Passing yards	291	228
Passing: comp–att–int	19–32–0	20–44–1
Turnovers	0	3
Time of possession	40:19	19:41

Team	Category	Player	Statistics
Bowling Green	Passing	Matt Schilz	19/31, 291 yards, 2 TDS
Bowling Green	Rushing	Anthon Samuel	22 carries, 141 yards, TD
Bowling Green	Receiving	Eugene Cooper	4 receptions, 110 yards, 2 TDS
Idaho	Passing	Brian Reader	19/43, 177 yards, 2 TDs, INT
Idaho	Rushing	Ryan Bass	12 carries, 44 yards
Idaho	Receiving	Mike Scott	6 receptions, 89 yards

=== vs Morgan State Bears ===
Morgan State Bears (0–1) vs Bowling Green Falcons (1–0) – Game summary

Quarter	1	2	3	4	Total
Bears	7	3	3	0	13
Falcons	28	7	14	9	58

at Doyt Perry Stadium • Bowling Green, OH

- Date: September 10, 2010
- Game time: 7:00 p.m.
- Game weather: Cloudy, 71 °F (22 °C), NE 8 MPH
- Game attendance: 15,206
- Referee: Stan Evans
- TV: BCSN

Game information

First quarter

- (10:45) BGSU – Eugene Cooper 37-yard pass from Matt Schilz (Kyle Burkhardt kick) (Drive: 7 plays, 75 yards, 2:30; Bowling Green 7-0)
- (08:27) BGSU – Kamar Jorden 10-yard pass from Matt Schilz (Kyle Burkhardt kick) (Drive: 2 plays, 12 yards, :46; Bowling Green 14-0)
- (07:46) MORG – Travis Davidson 61-yard run (Abraham Mercado kick) (Drive: 2 plays, 74 yards, :35; Bowling Green 14-7)
- (05:03) BGSU – Eugene Cooper 6-yard pass from Matt Schilz (Kyle Burkhardt kick) (Drive: 9 plays, 60 yards, 2:43; Bowling Green 21-7)
- (02:23) BGSU – Eugene Cooper 23-yard pass from Matt Schilz (Kyle Burkhardt kick) (Drive: 3 plays, 64 yards, 1:14; Bowling Green 28-7)

Second quarter

- (10:42) MORG – Abraham Mercado 28-yard field goal (Drive: 6 plays, 18 yards, 2:00; Bowling Green 28-10)
- (00:11) BGSU – Eugene Cooper 18-yard pass from Matt Schilz (Kyle Burkhardt kick) (Drive: 7 plays, 47 yards, :46; Bowling Green 35-10)

Third quarter

- (12:44) BGSU – Jordan Hopgood 14-yard run (Kyle Burkhardt kick) (Drive: 6 plays, 82 yards, 2:10; Bowling Green 42-10)
- (05:52) BGSU – Anthon Samuel 47-yard run (Kyle Burkhardt kick) (Drive: 3 plays, 55 yards, 1:23; Bowling Green 49-10)
- (01:20) MORG – Abraham Mercado 29-yard field goal (Drive: 8 plays, 16 yards, 2:50; Bowling Green 49-13)

Fourth quarter

- (11:52) BGSU – Stephen Stein 26-yard field goal (Drive: 9 plays, 64 yards, 4:29; Bowling Green 52-13)
- (09:14) BGSU – Jamel Martin 3-yard run (Stephen Stein kick failed) (Drive: 5 plays, 17 yards, 2:32; Bowling Green 58-13)

Statistics	Morgan State	Bowling Green
First downs	12	28
Plays–yards	63–193	76–572
Rushes–yards	34–156	49–268
Passing yards	37	304
Passing: comp–att–int	8–29–1	19–27–1
Turnovers	1	3
Time of possession	28:48	31:12

Team	Category	Player	Statistics
Morgan State	Passing	Robert Council	4/19, 32 yards, INT
Morgan State	Rushing	Travis Davidson	12 carries, 89 yards, TD
Morgan State	Receiving	Winfred Diggs	2 receptions, 19 yards
Bowling Green	Passing	Matt Schilz	16/23, 258 yards, 5 TDS, INT
Bowling Green	Rushing	Anthon Samuel	11 carries, 122 yards, TD
Bowling Green	Receiving	Eugene Cooper	6 receptions, 134 yards, 4 TDS

=== vs Wyoming Cowboys ===
Wyoming Cowboys (2–0) vs Bowling Green Falcons (2–0) – Game summary

Quarter	1	2	3	4	Total
Cowboys	0	7	14	7	28
Falcons	7	7	0	13	27

at Doyt Perry Stadium • Bowling Green, OH

- Date: September 17, 2010
- Game time: 12:00 p.m.
- Game weather: Mostly sunny, 70 °F (21 °C), ENE 10 MPH
- Game attendance: 14,813
- Referee: Marvel July
- TV announcers (BCSN): Greg Franke (play-by-play), Mike Lacett (sidelines)

Game information

First quarter

- (12:27) BGSU – Alex Bayer 40-yard pass from Matt Schilz (Kyle Burkhardt kick) (Drive: 6 plays, 72 yards, 2:33; Bowling Green 7-0)

Second quarter

- (12:15) WYO – Alvester Alexander 17-yard run (Daniel Sullivan kick) (Drive: 3 plays, 38 yards, :57; Tied 7-7)
- (05:03) BGSU – Kamar Jorden 13-yard pass from Matt Schilz (Kyle Burkhardt kick) (Drive: 11 plays, 66 yards, 3:53; Bowling Green 14-7)

Third quarter

- (10:20) WYO – Ghaali Muhammad 6-yard run (Daniel Sullivan kick) (Drive: 9 plays, 91 yards, :57; Tied 14-14)
- (05:42) WYO – Marqueston Huff 8-yard fumble return (Daniel Sullivan kick) (Wyoming 21-14)

Fourth quarter

- (13:20) WYO – Dominic Rufran 10-yard pass from Brett Smith (Daniel Sullivan kick) (Drive: 4 plays, 22 yards, :57; Wyoming 28-14)
- (04:16) BGSU – Kamar Jorden 32-yard pass from Matt Schilz (Kyle Burkhardt kick) (Drive: 8 plays, 67 yards, 1:33; Wyoming 28-21)
- (00:03) BGSU – Ray Hutson 10-yard pass from Matt Schilz (Kyle Burkhardt kick blocked) (Drive: 10 plays, 89 yards, 1:15; Wyoming 28-27)

Statistics	Wyoming	Bowling Green
First downs	18	28
Plays–yards	73–396	88–514
Rushes–yards	34–129	33–77
Passing yards	267	437
Passing: comp–att–int	25–39–1	34–55–2
Turnovers	1	6
Time of possession	30:03	29:57

Team	Category	Player	Statistics
Wyoming	Passing	Brett Smith	25/38, 267 yards, TD
Wyoming	Rushing	Alvester Alexander	9 carries, 42 yards, TD
Wyoming	Receiving	Mazi Ogbonna	6 receptions, 79 yards
Bowling Green	Passing	Matt Schilz	34/55, 437 yards, 4 TDS, 2 INTS
Bowling Green	Rushing	Jordan Hopgood	12 carries, 48 yards
Bowling Green	Receiving	Kamar Jorden	9 receptions, 101 yards, 2 TDS

Quarterback Matt Schilz threw for a career-high 437 yards, his first 400 yard game of his career.

=== At Miami RedHawks ===
Bowling Green Falcons (2–1) at Miami RedHawks (0–2) – Game summary

Quarter	1	2	3	4	Total
Falcons	6	14	7	10	37
RedHawks	0	17	0	6	23

at Yager Stadium • Oxford, OH

- Date: September 24, 2011
- Game time: 1:00 p.m. EDT
- Game weather: Mostly cloudy, 60 °F (16 °C), ESE 3 MPH
- Game attendance: 20,828
- Referee: Tom Weber
- TV: ESPN3

Game information

First quarter

- (03:15) BGSU – Jordan Hopgood 2-yard run (Kyle Burkhardt kick failed) (Drive: 5 plays, 18 yards, 2:08; Bowling Green 6-0)

Second quarter

- (13:44) MIAMI – Wes Williams 6-yard interception return (Mason Krysinski kick) (Miami 7-6)
- (09:22) BGSU – Alex Bayer 4-yard pass from Matt Schilz (Stephen Stein kick) (Drive: 8 plays, 62 yards, 4:09; Bowling Green 13-7)
- (06:06) MIAMI – Erik Finklea 1-yard run (Mason Krysinski kick) (Drive: 7 plays, 67 yards, 3:16; Miami 14-13)
- (01:47) BGSU – Kendall Montgomery 1-yard pass from Matt Schilz (Stephen Stein kick) (Drive: 1 play, 1 yard, :06; Bowling Green 20-14)
- (00:00) MIAMI – Mason Krysinski 45-yard field goal (Drive: 9 plays, 46 yards, 1:47; Bowling Green 20-17)

Third quarter

- (03:23) BGSU – Kamar Jorden 7-yard pass from Matt Schilz (Stephen Stein kick) (Drive: 16 plays, 89 yards, 8:13; Bowling Green 27-17)

Fourth quarter

- (14:17) BGSU – Stephen Stein 35-yard field goal (Drive: 7 plays, 32 yards, 3:03; Bowling Green 30-17)
- (11:03) MIAMI – Zac Dysert 1-yard run (Mason Krysinski kick failed) (Drive: 9 plays, 74 yards, 3:14; Bowling Green 30-23)
- (10:04) BGSU – Anthon Samuel 96-yard run (Stephen Stein kick) (Drive: 2 plays, 97 yards, 3:14; Bowling Green 37-23)

Statistics	Bowling Green	Miami (OH)
First downs	15	19
Plays–yards	62–310	71–308
Rushes–yards	38–127	31–43
Passing yards	183	265
Passing: comp–att–int	19–24–1	25–40–2
Turnovers	2	3
Time of possession	32:09	27:51

Team	Category	Player	Statistics
Bowling Green	Passing	Matt Schilz	19/24, 183 yards, 3 TDS, INT
Bowling Green	Rushing	Anthon Samuel	16 carries, 121 yards, TD
Bowling Green	Receiving	Kamar Jorden	9 receptions, 91 yards, TD
Miami (OH)	Passing	Zac Dysert	25/40, 265 yards, 2 INTS
Miami (OH)	Rushing	Erik Finklea	9 carries, 25 yards, TD
Miami (OH)	Receiving	Nick Harwell	8 receptions, 139 yards

=== At #22 West Virginia Mountaineers ===
Bowling Green Falcons (3–1) at #22 West Virginia Mountaineers (3–1) – Game summary

Quarter	1	2	3	4	Total
Falcons	10	0	0	0	10
Mountaineers	17	21	10	7	55

at Mountaineer Field • Morgantown, WV

- Date: October 1, 2011
- Game time: 3:30 p.m. EDT
- Game weather: Rain, 45 °F (7 °C), W 2 MPH
- Game attendance: 46,603
- Referee: Jeff Maconaghy
- TV announcers (Big East Network): Rob King & John Thornton

Game information

First quarter

- (13:37) WVU – Tyler Bitancurt 30-yard field goal (Drive: 6 plays, 26 yards, 1:14; West Virginia 3-0)
- (13:17) BGSU – Ray Hutson 18-yard pass from Matt Schilz (Stephen Stein kick) (Drive: 1 play, 18 yards, :06; Bowling Green 7-3)
- (07:47) BGSU – Stephen Stein 21-yard field goal (Drive: 11 plays, 52 yards, 4:14; Bowling Green 10-3)
- (06:05) WVU – Ivan McCartney 33-yard pass from Geno Smith (Tyler Bitancurt kick) (Drive: 5 plays, 70 yards, 1:36; Tied 10-10)
- (01:14) WVU – Shawne Alston 8-yard run (Tyler Bitancurt kick) (Drive: 11 plays, 71 yards, 3:46; West Virginia 17-10)

Second quarter

- (12:38) WVU – Ryan Nehlen 15-yard pass from Geno Smith (Tyler Bitancurt kick) (Drive: 9 plays, 60 yards, 2:43; West Virginia 24-10)
- (08:53) WVU – Dustin Garrison 19-yard run (Tyler Bitancurt kick) (Drive: 9 plays, 60 yards, 1:48; West Virginia 31-10)
- (02:40) WVU – Brad Starks 6-yard pass from Geno Smith (Tyler Bitancurt kick) (Drive: 7 plays, 49 yards, 2:29; West Virginia 38-10)

Third quarter

- (12:59) WVU – Dustin Garrison 8-yard run (Tyler Bitancurt kick) (Drive: 6 plays, 63 yards, 1:53; West Virginia 45-10)
- (05:38) WVU – Tyler Bitancurt 45-yard field goal (Drive: 12 plays, 29 yards, 5:23; West Virginia 48-10)
- (07:52) WVU – Shawne Alston 8-yard run (Tyler Bitancurt kick) (Drive: 6 plays, 84 yards, 2:25; West Virginia 55-10)

Statistics	Bowling Green	West Virginia
First downs	14	30
Plays–yards	62–217	79–643
Rushes–yards	36–103	46–360
Passing yards	183	265
Passing: comp–att–int	13–26–3	19–33–0
Turnovers	5	0
Time of possession	31:47	28:13

Team	Category	Player	Statistics
Bowling Green	Passing	Matt Schilz	13/25, 114 yards, TD, 3 INTS
Bowling Green	Rushing	Jamel Martin	23 carries, 111 yards
Bowling Green	Receiving	Kamar Jorden	5 receptions, 46 yards
West Virginia	Passing	Geno Smith	18/30, 238 yards, 3 TDS
West Virginia	Rushing	Dustin Garrison	32 carries, 291 yards, 2 TDS
West Virginia	Receiving	Stedman Bailey	4 receptions, 112 yards

== Statistics ==
Final Statistics through November 25, 2011

=== Individual Leaders ===
==== Passing ====
Passing statistics (Note: WR Ray Hutson threw one incompletion)
NAME	GP	GS	Record	Cmp	Att	Pct	Yds	TD	Int	Rtg
Matt Schilz	12	12	5–7	245	412	59.5	3,024	28	13	137.2
Trent Hurley	4	0	0–0	9	16	56.3	115	0	1	104.1
Totals	12	12	5–7	254	428	59.3	3,139	28	14	136.0

==== Rushing ====
Rushing statistics
NAME	GP	Att	Yds	Avg	Lng	TD
Anthon Samuel	9	144	844	5.9	96	5
Jamel Martin	10	78	280	3.6	28	3
Jordan Hopgood	9	60	213	3.5	23	4
Matt Schilz	12	51	-60	-1.2	20	0
Erique Geiger	6	19	52	2.7	9	0
John Pettigrew	4	17	63	3.7	15	1
Eugene Cooper	11	8	75	9.4	17	0
Trent Hurley	4	5	31	6.2	13	0
Brian Schmiedebusch	12	1	18	18.0	18	0
Ray Hutson	12	1	4	4.0	4	0
Totals	12	402	1,475	3.7	96	13

==== Receiving ====
Receiving statistics
NAME	GP	Rec	Yds	Avg	Lng	TD
Kamar Jorden	12	78	1,089	14.0	83	12
Eugene Cooper	11	67	808	12.1	76	9
Shaun Joplin	12	21	292	13.9	30	1
Alex Bayer	12	20	242	12.1	40	2
Adrian Hodges	11	15	197	13.1	56	0
Anthon Samuel	9	15	93	6.2	14	0
Ray Hutson	12	12	175	14.6	27	2
Tyler Beck	12	8	97	12.1	35	1
Jordan Hopgood	9	7	53	7.6	19	0
Justus Jones	9	4	49	12.3	15	0
Jamel Martin	10	3	10	3.3	5	0
Erique Geiger	6	2	10	5.0	6	0
Clay Rolf	5	1	23	23.0	23	0
Kendall Montgomery	11	1	1	1.0	1	1
Totals	12	254	3,139	12.4	83	28
