= 2011 MAC Championship Game =

2011 Marathon MAC Championship Game
- Conference Championship
Ohio Bobcats	Northern Illinois Huskies
(9–3)	(9–3)
20	23
Head coach: Frank Solich	Head coach: Dave Doeren
	1	2	3	4	Total
Ohio	10	10	0	0	20
Northern Illinois	0	0	7	16	23
- Date: December 2, 2011
- Season: 2011
- Stadium: Ford Field
- Location: Detroit, Michigan
- MVP: WR Nathan Palmer (NIU)
- Favorite: NIU by 3.5
- Referee: Ron Snodgrass
- Attendance: 13,052

United States TV coverage
- Network: ESPN2
- Announcers: Joe Tessitore (play-by-play); Rod Gilmore (analysis); Eamon McAnaney (sideline)

2011 Mid-American Conference football standings
	Conf.			Overall
Team	W		L	W		L
East Division
Ohio xy	6	–	2	10	–	4
Temple	5	–	3	9	–	4
Kent State	4	–	4	5	–	7
Bowling Green	3	–	5	5	–	7
Miami (OH)	3	–	5	4	–	8
Buffalo	2	–	6	3	–	9
Akron	0	–	8	1	–	11
West Division
Northern Illinois xy$	7	–	1	11	–	3
Toledo x	7	–	1	9	–	4
Western Michigan	5	–	3	7	–	6
Ball State	4	–	4	6	–	6
Eastern Michigan	4	–	4	6	–	6
Central Michigan	2	–	6	3	–	9
Championship: Northern Illinois 23, Ohio 20
$ – Conference champion; x – Division champion/co-champions; y – Championship game participant

The 2011 MAC Championship Game was a college football game played at 7:00 p.m. on Friday, December 2, 2011, at Ford Field in Detroit, Michigan, USA, to determine the 2011 champion of the Mid-American Conference (MAC). The game featured the Ohio Bobcats and the Northern Illinois Huskies. Sponsored by Marathon the game officially known as the "Marathon MAC Championship Game". Northern Illinois tied the record for their largest comeback in the school's history, coming back from down 20-0 to win 23-20 on the game's final play to win their second MAC championship of all time.

== Teams ==
=== Ohio Bobcats ===
Coming into the conference championship game, the Ohio Bobcats owned a 9-3 record, including a five-game win streak including conference wins over Kent State, Akron, Central Michigan, Bowling Green, and Miami (Ohio). The Bobcats also started the season with three straight wins, before losing three games in four weeks to Rutgers, Buffalo, and Ball State.

=== Northern Illinois Huskies ===
The Huskies came into the game having won seven straight contests beforehand, giving them a 9-3 record. NIU started the season with a thrilling win over Army before losing back-to-back games to Power-5 opponents Kansas and Wisconsin. The Huskies final loss of the season, and only conference loss came two weeks later against Central Michigan on October 1. The Huskies also had MAC Vern Smith League MVP Chandler Harnish quarterbacking their offense.

== Game summary ==
2011 Marathon MAC Championship Game

Quarter	1	2	3	4	Total
Ohio	10	10	0	0	20
Northern Illinois	0	0	7	16	23

at Ford Field • Detroit, Michigan

- Date: Friday, December 2, 2011
- Game time: 6:00 p.m. CST
- Game weather: n/a (indoor stadium)
- Referee: Rod Snodgrass
- TV announcers (ESPN2): Joe Tessitore (play-by-play), Rod Gilmore (analyst) and Eamon McAnaney (sideline)

Game information

First quarter

- (10:33) Ohio - Matt Weller 30 yard field goal (Drive: 4 plays, 6 yards, 01:34; OHIO 3-0)
- (4:05) Ohio - Donte Foster 24 yard pass from Phil Bates, Matt Weller kick (Drive: 8 plays, 70 yards, 3:57; OHIO 10-0)

Second quarter

- (11:03) Ohio - Matt Weller 21 yard field goal (Drive: 14 plays, 69 yards, 06:11; OHIO 13-0)
- (2:35) Ohio - Tyler Tettleton 18 yard rush, Matt Weller kick (Drive: 9 plays, 87 yards, 03:50; OHIO 20-0)

Third quarter

- (6:19) NIU - Nathan Palmer 39 yard pass from Chandler Harnish, Matthew Sims kick (Drive: 10 plays, 78 yards, 03:52, OHIO 20-7)

Fourth quarter

- (7:36) NIU - Martel Moore 32 yards from Chandler Harnish, kick no good (Drive: 4 plays, 63 yards, 01:13, OHIO 20-13)
- (2:52) NIU - Nathan Palmer 22 yards from Chandler Harnish, Matthew Sims kick (Drive: 6 plays, 57 yards, 01:44, Tied 20-20)
- (0:00) NIU - Matthew Sims 33 yard field goal (Drive: 5 plays, 48 yards, 01:18; NIU 23-20)

=== Statistics ===
Statistics	OHIO	NIU
First downs	21	19
Plays–yards	71-372	62–405
Rushes–yards	39-130	36–155
Passing yards	258	260
Passing: comp–att–int	19-32-3	16–26–1
Time of possession	20:22	15:50

Team	Category	Player	Statistics
Ohio	Passing	Tyler Tettleton	18/31, 218, 3 INT
Ohio	Rushing	Donte Harden	19 carries, 73 yards
Ohio	Receiving	LaVon Brazil	8 receptions, 124 yards
NIU	Passing	Chandler Harnish	16/26, 250 yards, 3 TD, 1 INT
NIU	Rushing	Jasmin Hopkins	11 carries, 60 yards
NIU	Receiving	Nathan Palmer	4 receptions, 115 yards, 2 TD

== See also ==
- List of Mid-American Conference football champions
- Mid-American Conference football individual awards
