= 2011 Miami RedHawks football team =

American college football season

2011 Miami RedHawks football
- Conference: Mid-American Conference
- East Division
- Record: 4–8 (3–5 MAC)
- Head coach: Don Treadwell (1st season)
- Offensive coordinator: John Klacik (1st season)
- Offensive scheme: Multiple
- Defensive coordinator: Pete Rekstis (1st season)
- Base defense: 4–3
- Home stadium: Yager Stadium

2011 Mid-American Conference football standings
	Conf.			Overall
Team	W		L	W		L
East Division
Ohio xy	6	–	2	10	–	4
Temple	5	–	3	9	–	4
Kent State	4	–	4	5	–	7
Bowling Green	3	–	5	5	–	7
Miami (OH)	3	–	5	4	–	8
Buffalo	2	–	6	3	–	9
Akron	0	–	8	1	–	11
West Division
Northern Illinois xy$	7	–	1	11	–	3
Toledo x	7	–	1	9	–	4
Western Michigan	5	–	3	7	–	6
Ball State	4	–	4	6	–	6
Eastern Michigan	4	–	4	6	–	6
Central Michigan	2	–	6	3	–	9
Championship: Northern Illinois 23, Ohio 20
$ – Conference champion; x – Division champion/co-champions; y – Championship game participant

The 2011 Miami RedHawks football team represented Miami University in the 2011 NCAA Division I FBS football season. The RedHawks were led by first-year head coach Don Treadwell and played their home games at Yager Stadium. They are a member of the East Division of the Mid-American Conference. They finished the season 4–8, 3–5 in MAC play to finish in a tie for fourth place in the East Division.

== Schedule ==
Date	Time	Opponent	Site	TV	Result	Attendance	Source
September 3	1:00 p.m.	at No. 21 Missouri*	Faurot Field; Columbia, MO	FSN	L 6–17	58,313	
September 17	3:30 p.m.	at Minnesota*	TCF Bank Stadium; Minneapolis, MN	BTN	L 23–29	49,950	
September 24	1:00 p.m.	Bowling Green	Yager Stadium; Oxford, OH		L 23–37	20,828	
October 1	1:00 p.m.	Cincinnati*	Yager Stadium; Oxford, OH (Victory Bell)	ESPN3	L 0–27	16,408	
October 8	1:00 p.m.	Army*	Yager Stadium; Oxford, OH	ONN	W 35–28	14,979	
October 15	3:30 p.m.	at Kent State	Dix Stadium; Kent, OH		W 9–3	15,245	
October 22	7:00 p.m.	at Toledo	Glass Bowl; Toledo, OH	ESPN3	L 28–49	25,910	
October 29	3:30 p.m.	Buffalo^{†}	Yager Stadium; Oxford, OH	SportsTime Ohio	W 41–13	16,131	
November 3	7:30 p.m.	Akron	Yager Stadium; Oxford, OH	ESPNU	W 35–3	12,968	
November 9	8:00 p.m.	at Temple	Lincoln Financial Field; Philadelphia, PA	ESPN2	L 21–24	17,050	
November 16	8:00 p.m.	Western Michigan	Yager Stadium; Oxford, OH	ESPN2	L 21–24	15,729	
November 22	7:00 p.m.	at Ohio	Peden Stadium; Athens, OH (Battle of the Bricks)	ESPN2	L 14–21	14,155	
*Non-conference game; ^{†}Homecoming; Rankings from AP Poll released prior to the game; All times are in Eastern time
