= 2011 Army Black Knights football team =

American college football season

2011 Army Black Knights football
- Conference: Independent
- Record: 3–9
- Head coach: Rich Ellerson (3rd season)
- Offensive coordinator: Ian Shields (3rd season)
- Offensive scheme: Triple option
- Co-defensive coordinators: Payam Saadat (3rd season); Chris Smeland (3rd season)
- Base defense: Double Eagle Flex
- Captains: Steve Erzinger; Max Jenkins; Andrew Rodriguez
- Home stadium: Michie Stadium

2011 NCAA Division I FBS independents football records
| | Conf. | | | Overall |
| Team | W | | L | W | | L |
|---|---|---|---|---|---|---|
| BYU | | – | | 10 | – | 3 |
| Notre Dame | | – | | 8 | – | 5 |
| Navy | | – | | 5 | – | 7 |
| Army | | – | | 3 | – | 9 |
Rankings from AP Poll

The 2011 Army Black Knights football team represented the United States Military Academy as an independent in the 2011 NCAA Division I FBS football season. The Black Knights were led by third-year head coach Rich Ellerson and played their home games at Michie Stadium. They finished the season 3–9.

== Schedule ==
| Date | Time | Opponent | Site | TV | Result | Attendance | Source |
|---|---|---|---|---|---|---|---|
| September 3 | 7:00 p.m. | at Northern Illinois | Huskie Stadium; DeKalb, IL | ESPN3 | L 26–49 | 17,003 | |
| September 10 | 12:00 p.m. | San Diego State | Michie Stadium; West Point, NY | CBSSN | L 20–23 | 26,778 | |
| September 17 | 3:30 p.m. | Northwestern | Michie Stadium; West Point, NY | CBSSN | W 21–14 | 35,784 | |
| September 24 | 2:00 p.m. | at Ball State | Scheumann Stadium; Muncie, IN | ESPN3 | L 21–48 | 15,288 | |
| October 1 | 12:00 p.m. | Tulane | Michie Stadium; West Point, NY | CBSSN | W 45–6 | 31,235 | |
| October 8 | 1:00 p.m. | at Miami (OH) | Yager Stadium; Oxford, OH | ONN | L 28–35 | 14,979 | |
| October 22 | 7:00 p.m. | at Vanderbilt | Vanderbilt Stadium; Nashville, TN | ESPNU | L 21–44 | 32,210 | |
| October 29 | 3:30 p.m. | Fordham | Michie Stadium; West Point, NY | CBSSN | W 55–0 | 39,481 | |
| November 5 | 3:30 p.m. | at Air Force | Falcon Stadium; Colorado Springs, CO (Commander-in-Chief's Trophy) | CBS | L 14–24 | 46,709 | |
| November 12 | 3:30 p.m. | vs. Rutgers | Yankee Stadium; Bronx, NY | CBSSN | L 12–27 | 30,028 | |
| November 19 | 1:00 p.m. | at Temple | Lincoln Financial Field; Philadelphia, PA | ESPN3 | L 14–42 | 25,516 | |
| December 10 | 2:30 p.m. | vs. Navy | FedExField; Landover, MD (Army–Navy Game, Commander-in-Chief's Trophy) | CBS | L 21–27 | 80,789 | |
All times are in Eastern time

== Game summaries ==
=== Northern Illinois ===
| | 1 | 2 | 3 | 4 | Total |
|---|---|---|---|---|---|
| Black Knights | 6 | 0 | 0 | 20 | 26 |
| Huskies | 14 | 21 | 14 | 0 | 49 |

Northern Illinois quarterback Chandler Harnish threw three touchdowns in the first eighteen minutes of the game and would have five passing TD's on the day and one rushing as the Huskies downed Army in the season opener for both teams. The game marked the head coaching debut for NIU's Dave Doeren. Notable performances included Northern Illinois running back Jasmin Hopkins' 138 yards rushing. Army was led by slotback Malcom Brown with 92 yards rushing and a touchdown on 9 carries. The win for NIU was their first ever over a service academy in four tries. The Huskies had previously been defeated by the Black Knights in 1992 and suffered losses to Navy in 2007 and 2008.

Scoring summary

1st quarter

- 13:43 NIU – Courtney Stephen 16 Yd Return Of Blocked Punt (Mathew Sims Kick) 7–0 NIU
- 2:37 Army – Trenton Turrentine 14 Yd Run (Pat Failed) 7–6 NIU
- 1:36 NIU – Luke Eakes 13 Yd Pass From Chandler Harnish (Mathew Sims Kick) 14–6 NIU

2nd quarter

- 14:50 NIU – Nathan Palmer 19 Yd Pass From Chandler Harnish (Mathew Sims Kick) 21–6 NIU
- 12:49 NIU – Akeem Daniels 6 Yd Pass From Chandler Harnish (Mathew Sims Kick) 28–6 NIU
- 7:29 NIU – Chandler Harnish 1 Yd Run (Mathew Sims Kick) 35–6 NIU

3rd quarter

- 10:16 NIU – Jamal Womble 58 Yd Pass From Chandler Harnish (Mathew Sims Kick) 42–6 NIU
- 1:20 NIU – Martel Moore 4 Yd Pass From Chandler Harnish (Mathew Sims Kick) 49–6 NIU

4th quarter

- 14:35 Army – Trent Steelman 2 Yd Run (Two-Point Conversion Failed) 49–12 NIU
- 8:27 Army – Malcolm Brown 1 Yd Run (Trent Steelman Run For Two-Point Conversion) 49–20 NIU
- 0:12 Army – Jared McFarlin 11 Yd Pass From Max Jenkins (Two-Point Conversion Failed) 49–26 NIU

=== San Diego State ===
| | 1 | 2 | 3 | 4 | Total |
|---|---|---|---|---|---|
| Aztecs | 14 | 0 | 6 | 3 | 23 |
| Black Knights | 7 | 7 | 0 | 6 | 20 |

Ronnie Hillman rushed for 117 yards and two touchdowns as San Diego State held on to defeat Army 23–20. Army dominated the game in terms of total yards (446–292), rushing yards (403–146) and time of possession (42:11–17:49) but the Black Knights committed eight fumbles, losing three of them, allowing SDSU to come away with the victory. Army quarterback Trent Steelman led the Black Knights potent rushing attack with a career-high 157 yards and scored three rushing touchdowns. The game was the first time since 1980 that a team from California played at West Point. Despite the close score, the Aztecs never trailed in the game. Army missed an extra point kick for the second time in two games. Last season the Black Knights only missed one PAT the entire year.

Scoring summary

1st quarter

- 14:27 SDSU – Colin Lockett 68 Yd Pass From Ryan Lindley (Abelardo Perez Kick) 7–0 SDSU
- 5:33 SDSU – Ronnie Hillman 16 Yd Run (Abelardo Perez Kick) 14–0 SDSU
- 0:44 Army – Trent Steelman 1 Yd Run (Alex Carlton Kick) 14–7 SDSU

2nd quarter

- 6:53 Army – Trent Steelman 11 Yd Run (Alex Carlton Kick) 14–14

3rd quarter

- 1:56 SDSU – Ronnie Hillman 20 Yd Run (PAT Failed) 20–14 SDSU

4th quarter

- 12:37 Army – Trent Steelman 17 Yd Run (PAT Failed) 20–20
- 9:29 SDSU – Abelardo Perez 42 Yd FG 23–20 SDSU

=== Northwestern ===
Northwestern at Army

| Team | 1 | 2 | 3 | 4 | Total |
|---|---|---|---|---|---|
| Northwestern | 0 | 7 | 0 | 7 | 14 |
| • Army | 7 | 0 | 7 | 7 | 21 |

- Date: September 17
- Location: Michie Stadium, West Point, NY
- Game start: 3:30 p.m. EST
- TV announcers (CBS Sports Network): Gary Thorne and Randy Cross

Scoring summary
| 1 | 3:49 | ARMY | Trent Steelman 17-yard run (Alex Carlton kick) | ARMY 7–0 |
| 2 | 5:23 | NW | Jeremy Ebert 14-yard pass from Kain Colter (Jeff Budzien kick) | Tied 7–7 |
| 3 | 10:43 | ARMY | Trent Steelman 1-yard run (Alex Carlton kick) | ARMY 14–7 |
| 4 | 6:03 | NW | Jeremy Ebert 62-yard pass from Trevor Siemian (Jeff Budzien kick) | Tied 14–14 |
| 4 | 2:49 | ARMY | Trent Steelman 1-yard run (Alex Carlton kick) | ARMY 21–14 |

For the second straight week Army quarterback Trent Steelman rushed for three touchdowns to lead the Black Knights to their first victory of the season. Steelman led Army in rushing for a second straight week with 108 yards on the ground. The win for the Black Knights marked the third season in a row that they have defeated a team from an AQ conference (Vanderbilt 2009 and Duke 2010). Jeremy Ebert was the leading gainer on offense for the Wildcats, posting 108 yards receiving and two touchdown grabs. Once again Army dominated the time of possession battle, doubling up Northwestern at 40:19–19:41. Army's defense held strong all game, as the Wildcats only converted 3 of 12 third downs after averaging 50 percent their first two games.

=== Ball State ===
| | 1 | 2 | 3 | 4 | Total |
|---|---|---|---|---|---|
| Black Knights | 0 | 0 | 7 | 14 | 21 |
| Cardinals | 7 | 24 | 14 | 3 | 48 |

Ball State marched down the field and scored a touchdown on their opening possession and never looked back. The Cardinals took a commanding 31–0 lead by halftime and went on to defeat the Black Knights 48–21. Ball State quarterback Keith Wenning was nearly perfect on the day going 24–30 with a career-high 324 yards, three touchdown passes and no interceptions. Wideout, Willie Snead IV added 10 catches for 180 yards and a touchdown. Raymond Maples and Jared Hassin paced Army with 125 yards and 111 yards respectively. Army quarterbacks did not complete a pass to a Black Knights receiver throughout the course of the game.

Ball State improved their record to 3–1, 1995 was the last time they started a season with a 3–1 record. For the first time in the 2011 season Army did not win the time of possession battle, losing that statistic by a time of 31:12–28:48.

Scoring summary

1st quarter

- 10:01 Ball St. – Jahwan Edwards 3 Yd Run (Steven Schott Kick) 7–0 BSU

2nd quarter

- 12:38 Ball St. – Jahwan Edwards 12 Yd Run (Steven Schott Kick) 14–0 BSU
- 4:39 Ball St. – Jamill Smith 2 Yd Pass From Keith Wenning (Steven Schott Kick) 21–0 BSU
- 2:38 Ball St. – Willie Snead IV 21 Yd Pass From Keith Wenning (Steven Schott Kick) 28–0 BSU
- 0:00 Ball St. – Steven Schott 21 Yd FG 31–0 BSU

3rd quarter

- 8:12 Ball St. – Jahwan Edwards 1 Yd Run (Steven Schott Kick) 38–0 BSU
- 4:11 Army – Raymond Maples 1 Yd Run (Alex Carlton Kick) 38–7 BSU
- 1:47 Ball St. – David Schneider 51 Yd Pass From Keith Wenning (Steven Schott Kick) 45–7 BSU

4th quarter

- 12:49 Army – Raymond Maples 19 Yd Run (Alex Carlton Kick) 45–14 BSU
- 2:50 Ball St. – Steven Schott 22 Yd FG 48–14 BSU
- 1:07 Army – Terry Baggett 7 Yd Run (Alex Carlton Kick) 48–21 BSU

=== Tulane ===
| | 1 | 2 | 3 | 4 | Total |
|---|---|---|---|---|---|
| Green Wave | 6 | 0 | 0 | 0 | 6 |
| Black Knights | 7 | 14 | 10 | 14 | 45 |

Tulane only needed three plays to score its first points of the game, however those would be the only six points they scored all day as Army scored the next 45 points to defeat the Green Wave 45–6. Army quarterback Trent Steelman threw for 70 yards and a touchdown and then ran for another 54 yards and two rushing touchdowns. Army's defense held Tulane to just 199 yards of total offense, their lowest output of the season. Raymond Maples rushed for a career-high 141 yards and a touchdown for the Black Knights. Tulane was led by Orleans Darkwa who rushed for 138 yards and their only touchdown. Army's win evened the all-time series between the one-time Conference USA rivals at 9–9–1.

Scoring summary

1st quarter

- 13:54 Tulane – Orleans Darkwa 3 Yd Run (Pat Failed) 0–6 Tulane
- 8:35 Army – Larry Dixon 2 Yd Run (Alex Carlton Kick) 7–6 Army

2nd quarter

- 14:24 Army – Trent Steelman 2 Yd Run (Alex Carlton Kick) 14–6 Army
- 1:07 Army – Trent Steelman 1 Yd Run (Alex Carlton Kick) 21–6 Army

3rd quarter

- 9:54 Army – Davyd Brooks 40 Yd Pass From Trent Steelman (Alex Carlton Kick) 28–6 Army
- 7:47 Army – Alex Carlton 23 Yd FG 31–6 Army

4th quarter

- 14:53 Army – Raymond Maples 23 Yd Run (Alex Carlton Kick) 38–6 Army
- 2:46 Army – Kelechi Odocha 14 Yd Run (Alex Carlton Kick) 45–6 Army

=== Miami (OH) ===
| | 1 | 2 | 3 | 4 | Total |
|---|---|---|---|---|---|
| Black Knights | 14 | 7 | 7 | 0 | 28 |
| RedHawks | 14 | 0 | 7 | 14 | 35 |

Miami Quarterback Zac Dysert threw for 342 yards and four touchdowns, while Nick Harwell caught ten of his passes for 186 yards including two of the TD's as Miami (Ohio) won their first game of the season 35–28 over Army. Harwell's 186 yards in a game was the third highest total in a single game in school history. Trailing 28–14 late in the third quarter, the RedHawks scored three straight touchdowns and then stopped Army in the red-zone with less than a minute left in the contest to preserve the victory. Army Quarterback Trent Steelman posted another solid game with 99 yards rushing and two TD runs. He also was a perfect eight for eight passing for 124 yards and a touchdown pass. Raymond Maples rushed for 111 yards and a touchdown as well to pace the Black Knights potent rushing attack. The victory was the first head coaching win for Don Treadwell.

Scoring summary

1st quarter

- 13:03 Miami – Nick Harwell 13 Yd Pass From Zac Dysert (Mason Krysinski Kick) 7–0 Miami
- 8:01 Army – Trent Steelman 1 Yd Run (Alex Carlton Kick) 7–7
- 1:14 Army – Raymond Maples 25 Yd Run (Alex Carlton Kick) 7–14 Army
- 0:00 Miami – Zac Dysert 1 Yd Run (Mason Krysinski Kick) 14–14

2nd quarter

- 4:00 Army – Malcom Brown 45 Yd Pass From Trent Steelman (Alex Carlton kick) 14–21 Army

3rd quarter

- 12:37 Army – Trent Steelman 5 Yd Run (Alex Carlton Kick) 14–28 Army
- 2:30 Miami – Justin Semmes 17 Yd Pass From Zac Dysert (Mason Krysinski Kick) 21–28 Army

4th quarter

- 14:56 Miami – Andy Cruse 9 Yd Pass From Zac Dysert (Mason Krysinski Kick) 28–28
- 7:05 Miami – Nick Harwell 20 Yd Pass From Zac Dysert (Mason Krysinski Kick) 35–28 Miami

=== Vanderbilt ===
| | 1 | 2 | 3 | 4 | Total |
|---|---|---|---|---|---|
| Black Knights | 6 | 0 | 8 | 7 | 21 |
| Commodores | 13 | 10 | 14 | 7 | 44 |

Zac Stacy had a career-high 198 yards rushing and three touchdowns as Vanderbilt scored a 44–21 victory over Army in Nashville. Vanderbilt Quarterback, and brother to NFL star Aaron Rodgers, Jordan Rodgers passed for 186 yards and a touchdown and ran for 96 as well as a rushing touchdown. The Commodores controlled the rushing game and time of possession battle. The game marked the first time in the season that the Black Knights were out-rushed (344–270 yards). Army came into the matchup with the Number 1 rushing offense in the NCAA FBS. Army was led on the ground by Larry Dixon who finished with 92 yards rushing.

Scoring summary

1st quarter

- 10:48 Vandy – Zac Stacy 1 Yd Run (Carey Spear Kick) 7–0 Vandy
- 10:03 Vandy – Chris Boyd 43 Yd Pass From Jordan Rodgers (Pat Failed) 13–0 Vandy
- 6:05 Army – Malcolm Brown 11 Yd Run (Pat Failed) 13–6 Vandy

2nd quarter

- 4:49 Vandy – Jordan Rodgers 12 Yd Run (Carey Spear Kick) 20–6 Vandy
- 0:37 Vandy – Carey Spear 37 Yd FG 23–6 Vandy

3rd quarter

- 6:39 Vandy – Jerron Seymour 5 Yd Run (Carey Spear Kick) 30–6 Vandy
- 5:39 Vandy – Zac Stacy 8 Yd Run (Carey Spear Kick) 37–6 Vandy
- 1:39 Army – Angel Santiago 1 Yd Run (Angel Santiago Pass To Larry Dixon For Two-Point Conversion) 37–14 Vandy

4th quarter

- 11:52 Army – Geoffrey Bacon 70 Yd Interception Return (Alex Carlton Kick) 37–21 Vandy
- 6:38 Vandy – Zac Stacy 55 Yd Run (Ryan Fowler Kick) 44–21 Vandy

=== Fordham ===
Fordham at Army

| Team | 1 | 2 | 3 | 4 | Total |
|---|---|---|---|---|---|
| Fordham | 0 | 0 | 0 | 0 | 0 |
| • Army | 21 | 21 | 7 | 6 | 55 |

- Date: October 29
- Location: Michie Stadium, West Point, NY
- Game start: 3:30 p.m. EST
- Game weather: Snow

Scoring summary
| 1 | 12:38 | ARMY | Max Jenkins 1-yard run (Alex Carlton kick) | ARMY 7–0 |
| 1 | 6:57 | ARMY | Larry Dixon 30-yard run (Alex Carlton kick) | ARMY 14–0 |
| 1 | 5:15 | ARMY | Max Jenkins 7-yard run (Alex Carlton kick) | ARMY 21–0 |
| 2 | 12:15 | ARMY | Anthony Stephens 30-yard pass from Max Jenkins (Alex Carlton kick) | ARMY 28–0 |
| 2 | 10:42 | ARMY | Nate Combs 42-yard fumble return (Alex Carlton kick) | ARMY 35–0 |
| 2 | 4:57 | ARMY | Jared Hassin 3-yard run (Alex Carlton kick) | ARMY 42–0 |
| 3 | 8:40 | ARMY | Jonathan Crucitti 4-yard run (Alex Carlton kick) | ARMY 49–0 |
| 4 | 4:25 | ARMY | Harry Tippett 10-yard run (kick blocked) | ARMY 55–0 |

Backup Quarterback Max Jenkins rushed for two touchdowns and threw for one more as Army shut out Fordham in a rare October snow storm at West Point. Raymond Maples, despite only playing in the first half rushed for 159 yards on 10 carries to lead the Black Knight rushing attack, which gained 514 yards on the ground. Army held Fordham's offense to just 86 yards, and the Black Knights defense also scored a touchdown on a fumble recovery by Nate Combs. Fordham was shut out for the first time in six years and allowed 50 points for the first time in more than decade. The game was just the 3rd meeting with Army winning all three games. The first Army win was a historic win in 1891, a 10–6 victory, which was the first one in the program's history. The last meeting between the two squads was in 1949, a legendary chippy game.

=== Air Force ===
| | 1 | 2 | 3 | 4 | Total |
|---|---|---|---|---|---|
| Black Knights | 14 | 0 | 0 | 0 | 14 |
| Falcons | 0 | 0 | 21 | 3 | 24 |

Air Force came from behind to defeat Army and secure their second straight Commander-in-Chief's Trophy. The Black Knights went up 14–0 early and looked like they would run away with the game. However, a controversial replay call nullified a potential touchdown run by Quarterback Max Jenkins, and later Army looked to score another touchdown but Scott Williams lost a fumble on the 1-yard line. Air Force Quarterback Tim Jefferson led the comeback with two touchdown runs and kicker Parker Herrington booted three field goals to secure the win. Jefferson finished the day passing for 122 yards and rushing for 66 more. Army was led by Raymond Maples who ran for 132 yards.

Scoring summary

1st quarter

- 9:19 Army – Max Jenkins 1 Yd Run (Alex Carlton Kick) 0–7 Army
- 1:58 Army – Larry Dixon 13 Yd Run (Alex Carlton Kick) 0–14 Army

2nd quarter

3rd quarter

- 11:55 AF – Parker Herrington 37 Yd FG 3–14 Army
- 4:54 AF – Tim Jefferson 2 Yd Run (Asher Clark Run For Two-Point Conversion) 11–14 Army
- 1:39 AF – Parker Herrington 39 Yd FG 14–14
- 0:15 AF – Tim Jefferson 1 Yd Run (Parker Herrington Kick) 21–14 Air Force

4th quarter

- 11:49 AF – Parker Herrington 39 Yd FG 24–14 Air Force

=== Rutgers ===
| | 1 | 2 | 3 | 4 | Total |
|---|---|---|---|---|---|
| Scarlet Knights | 0 | 6 | 7 | 14 | 27 |
| Black Knights | 6 | 0 | 0 | 6 | 12 |

Rutgers used a 13 catch, 129 yard receiving day from Mohamed Sanu to knock off Army 27–12 in a game played at Yankee Stadium. Sanu's 13 catches put him into sole possession of first place on the career high list for receptions in the Big East Conference with 93 total. He broke the previous record of 92 set by Larry Fitzgerald in 2003. Rutgers Quarterback Chas Dodd threw for 196 yards and two touchdowns, however, his two interceptions kept Army in the game. The Black Knights were paced on the ground by Larry Dixon who rushed for 93 yards and a score. However, the nation's leading rushing attack of Army was held to just 228 yards. Former Rutgers player Eric LeGrand, who was paralyzed in last season's contest between the two teams appeared prior to the game to perform the honorary coin toss.

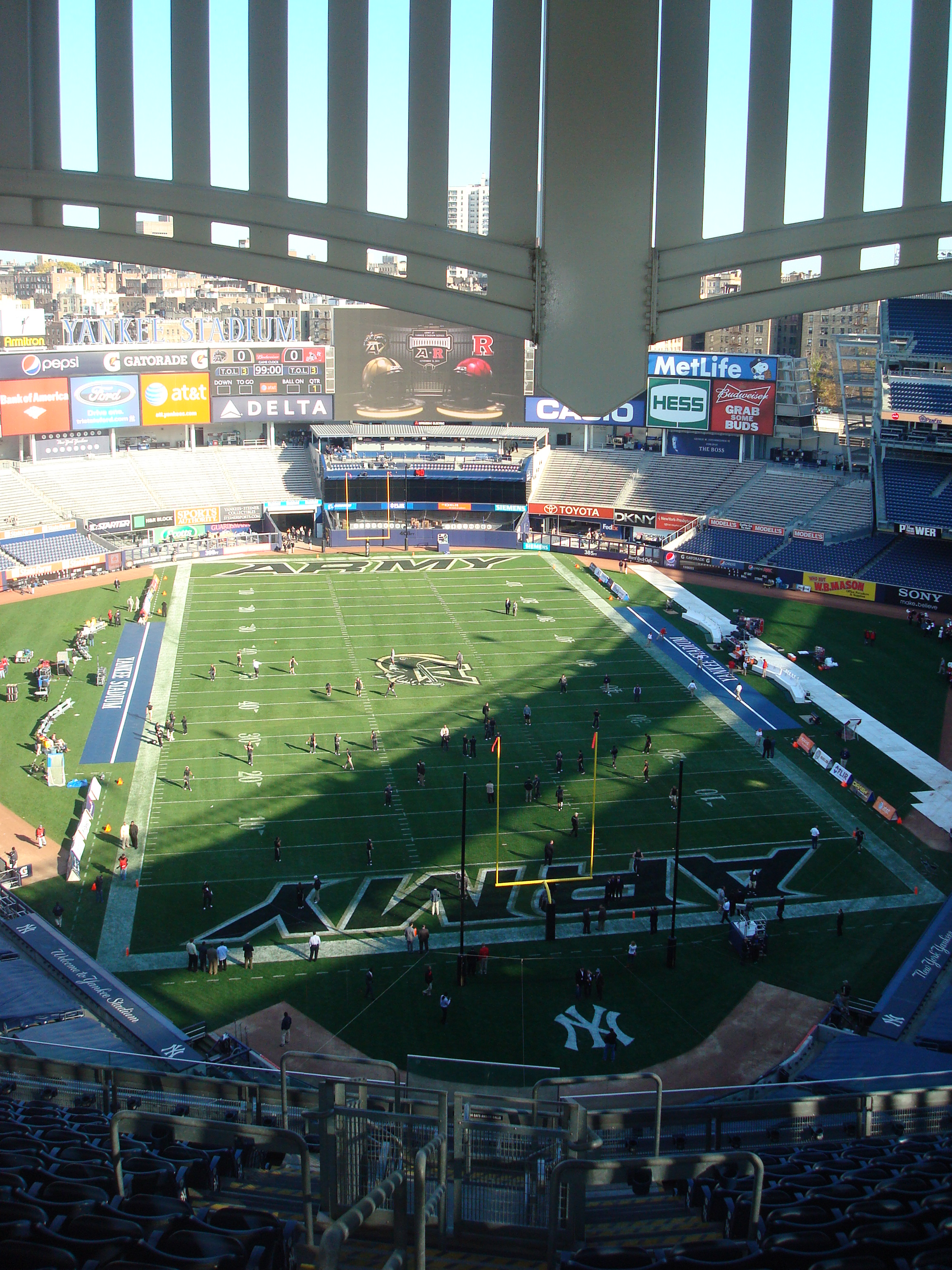
Yankee Stadium for a November 12th 2011 game between Army and Rutgers.

Scoring summary

1st quarter

- 11:28 Army – Alex Carlton 18 Yd FG 0–3 Army
- 2:32 Army – Alex Carlton 19 Yd FG 0–6 Army

2nd quarter

- 2:16 RU – Michael Burton 3 Yd Pass From Chas Dodd (Pat Failed) 6–6

3rd quarter

- 10:45 RU – Brandon Coleman 38 Yd Pass From Chas Dodd (San San Te Kick) 13–6 Rutgers

4th quarter

- 14:02 Army – Larry Dixon 2 Yd Run (Pat Failed) 13–12 Rutgers
- 6:36 RU – Jordan Thomas 32 Yd Return Of Blocked Punt (San San Te Kick) 20–12 Rutgers
- 1:57 RU – Jawan Jamison 56 Yd Run (San San Te Kick) 27–12 Rutgers

=== Temple ===
| | 1 | 2 | 3 | 4 | Total |
|---|---|---|---|---|---|
| Black Knights | 0 | 0 | 7 | 7 | 14 |
| Owls | 14 | 14 | 0 | 14 | 42 |

Temple's high-powered rushing attack gained 335 yards and the Owls scored 42 points en route to crushing Army 42–14. The Owls were paced by Bernard Pierce and Matt Brown who rushed for 157 yards and 133 yards respectively. Pierce scored three touchdowns on the day while Brown added two more of his own. Raymond Maples led the Army rushing attack with 93 yards on the ground.

Scoring summary

1st quarter

- 12:06 Temple – Matt Brown 22 Yd Run (Brandon McManus Kick) 7–0 Temple
- 0:26 Temple – Bernard Pierce 11 Yd Run (Brandon Mcmanus Kick) 14–0 Temple

2nd quarter

- 4:30 Temple – Bernard Pierce 1 Yd Run (Brandon Mcmanus Kick) 21–0 Temple
- 1:07 Temple – Joe Jones 36 Yd Pass From Chris Coyer (Brandon Mcmanus Kick) 28–0 Temple

3rd quarter

- 2:59 Army – Max Jenkins 1 Yd Run (Alex Carlton Kick) 28–7 Temple

4th quarter

- 10:37 Temple – Matt Brown 52 Yd Run (Brandon Mcmanus Kick) 35–7 Temple
- 7:30 Army – Larry Dixon 15 Yd Run (Alex Carlton Kick) 35–14 Temple
- 5:11 Temple – Bernard Pierce 49 Yd Run (Brandon Mcmanus Kick) 42–14 Temple

=== Navy ===
Army vs. Navy

| Team | 1 | 2 | 3 | 4 | Total |
|---|---|---|---|---|---|
| Army | 0 | 14 | 7 | 0 | 21 |
| • Navy | 7 | 7 | 7 | 6 | 27 |

- Date: December 10
- Location: FedExField, Landover, MD
- Game start: 2:30 p.m.
- Elapsed time: 3:16
- Game attendance: 80,789
- Game weather: Sunny, 46 F, wind 9–19 NW
- Referee: Jeff Flanagan
- Television network: CBS

Scoring summary
| 1 | 1:06 | NAVY | Kriss Proctor 4-yard run (Jon Teague kick) | NAVY 7–0 |
| 2 | 7:05 | NAVY | Alexander Teich 10-yard run (Jon Teague kick) | NAVY 14–0 |
| 2 | 3:34 | ARMY | Trent Steelman 34-yard run (Alex Carlton kick) | NAVY 14–7 |
| 2 | 0:49 | ARMY | Malcolm Brown 5-yard run (Alex Carlton kick) | Tied 14–14 |
| 3 | 12:43 | NAVY | Kriss Proctor 2-yard run (Jon Teague kick) | NAVY 21–14 |
| 3 | 9:45 | ARMY | Malcolm Brown 25-yard pass from Trent Steelman (Alex Carlton kick) | Tied 21–21 |
| 4 | 12:03 | NAVY | Jon Teague 23-yard field goal | NAVY 24–21 |
| 4 | 10:26 | NAVY | Jon Teague 44-yard field goal | NAVY 27–21 |

== Roster ==
- Malcolm Brown
- Andrew Rodriguez
- Trent Steelman
