= 2011 Buffalo Bulls football team =

American college football season

2011 Buffalo Bulls football
- Conference: Mid-American Conference
- East Division
- Record: 3–9 (2–6 MAC)
- Head coach: Jeff Quinn (2nd season)
- Offensive coordinator: Alex Wood (1st season)
- Offensive scheme: Multiple
- Defensive coordinator: William Inge (2nd season)
- Base defense: 4–3
- Captains: Chazz Anderson; Fred Branch; Richie Smith; John Syty
- Home stadium: University at Buffalo Stadium

2011 Mid-American Conference football standings
	Conf.			Overall
Team	W		L	W		L
East Division
Ohio xy	6	–	2	10	–	4
Temple	5	–	3	9	–	4
Kent State	4	–	4	5	–	7
Bowling Green	3	–	5	5	–	7
Miami (OH)	3	–	5	4	–	8
Buffalo	2	–	6	3	–	9
Akron	0	–	8	1	–	11
West Division
Northern Illinois xy$	7	–	1	11	–	3
Toledo x	7	–	1	9	–	4
Western Michigan	5	–	3	7	–	6
Ball State	4	–	4	6	–	6
Eastern Michigan	4	–	4	6	–	6
Central Michigan	2	–	6	3	–	9
Championship: Northern Illinois 23, Ohio 20
$ – Conference champion; x – Division champion/co-champions; y – Championship game participant

The 2011 Buffalo Bulls football team represented the University at Buffalo as a member of the Mid-American Conference (MAC) during the 2011 NCAA Division I FBS football season. Led by second-year head coach Jeff Quinn, the Bulls compiled an overall record of 3–9 with a mark of 2–6 in conference play, placing sixth in the MAC's East Division. The team played home games at the University at Buffalo Stadium in Amherst, New York.

== Schedule ==
Date	Time	Opponent	Site	TV	Result	Attendance	Source
September 3	6:00 pm	at Pittsburgh*	Heinz Field; Pittsburgh, PA	ESPN3	L 16–35	48,359	
September 10	6:00 pm	Stony Brook*	University at Buffalo Stadium; Amherst, NY	TWCS	W 35–7	21,933	
September 17	7:00 pm	at Ball State	Scheumann Stadium; Muncie, IN		L 25–28	8,964	
September 24	6:00 pm	Connecticut*^{†}	University at Buffalo Stadium; Amherst, NY	Big East Network	L 3–17	18,215	
October 1	12:30 pm	at Tennessee*	Neyland Stadium; Knoxville, TN	CSS	L 10–41	87,758	
October 8	3:30 pm	Ohio	University at Buffalo Stadium; Amherst, NY	TWCS	W 38–37	15,051	
October 15	1:00 pm	at Temple	Lincoln Financial Field; Philadelphia, PA		L 0–34	25,820	
October 22	12:00 pm	Northern Illinois	University at Buffalo Stadium; Amherst, NY	ESPN3	L 30–31	13,370	
October 29	3:30 pm	at Miami (OH)	Yager Stadium; Oxford, OH	TWCS	L 13–41	16,131	
November 12	1:00 pm	at Eastern Michigan	Rynearson Stadium; Ypsilanti, MI		L 17–30	3,830	
November 19	12:00 pm	Akron	University at Buffalo Stadium; Amherst, NY	TWCS	W 51–10	14,509	
November 25	12:00 pm	Bowling Green	University at Buffalo Stadium; Amherst, NY	TWCS	L 28–42	12,262	
*Non-conference game; ^{†}Homecoming; All times are in Eastern time

== Game summaries ==
=== Pittsburgh ===
Team	1	2	3	4	Total
Bulls	0	3	7	6	16
• Panthers	7	0	14	14	35

- Date: September 3, 2011
- Location: Heinz Field
  Pittsburgh, PA
- Game start: 6:00 p.m. EST
- Game attendance: 48,359
- Television network: ESPN3

The Panthers took the lead in the first quarter with a rushing touchdown by Graham. Buffalo's offense struggled to gain any yardage on the ground or in the air. Early in the second quarter, Pittsburgh missed a 32-yard field goal. One Panther drive later, and Pittsburgh missed a 47-yard field goal. Once the Bulls got the ball back, Peter Farning kicked a 40-yard field goal, putting Buffalo on the scoreboard. Both defenses remained strong throughout the first half of play. The Bulls got the ball first in the third quarter. Chazz Anderson, Buffalo's starting QB, drove for 49 yards before being intercepted by Pittsburgh's defense. Ray Graham of the Panthers later rushed for touchdown to go ahead 14–3. The next drive, Anderson lead a Buffalo drive that took them to the end zone. The score was then 14–10. Pittsburgh soon answered back with a 5-yard rushing touchdown by Ray Graham. Going into the fourth quarter, Buffalo's running back, Branden Oliver, punched in a 1-yard touchdown. The Bulls tried a 2-point conversion, but failed to make the score 21–16. Pittsburgh answered back yet again however with a quick 6 play, 60-yard drive that ended with a touchdown. On the next drive, the Bulls gained 42 yards, but failed to convert on fourth down, forcing them to turn over. On the next drive, Ray Graham broke loose for 75 yards, and later punched in a touchdown with a 1-yard gain. The end score was 35–16, Pittsburgh.

=== Stony Brook ===
Team	1	2	3	4	Total
Seawolves	0	7	0	0	7
• Bulls	7	14	14	0	35

- Date: September 10, 2011
- Location: UB Stadium
  Amherst, NY
- Game start: 6:00 p.m. EST
- Game attendance: 21,933
- Television network: Time Warner Cable SportsNet, ESPN3

After a 53-yard kick return by Buffalo's Terrell Jackson, Chazz Anderson started the game by throwing a 57-yard touchdown to Alex Dennison. Within 19 seconds, the Bulls were up by 7–0. The rest of the first quarter was scoreless for both teams. Within 2 minutes of the second quarter, Stony Brook drove for 92 yards in 10 plays, ending in a touchdown by Jordan Gush. Buffalo took the ball back the next drive, and scored a touchdown by Branden Oliver. The next drive for Buffalo also ended in a touchdown, with a 49-yard rush by Branden Oliver. The Bulls went into halftime leading Stony Brook 21–7. Within 4 minutes of the 3rd quarter, Buffalo scored another touchdown. Chazz Anderson threw a pass to Devon Hughes, who made his way to the end zone with a 15-yard run. Buffalo ended the 3rd quarter with a 43-yard rushing touchdown by Branden Oliver, making it 35–7. In the fourth quarter, Stony Brook drove for 50 yards, until Khalil Mack sacked Stony Brook's quarterback, Kyle Essington, who fumbled. Fred Branch of Buffalo recovered the ball to put away the game.

=== Ball State ===
Team	1	2	3	4	Total
Bulls	7	0	6	12	25
• Cardinals	0	21	0	7	28

- Date: September 17, 2011
- Location: Scheumann Stadium
  Muncie, IN
- Game start: 7:00 p.m. EST
- Game attendance: 8,964

The game started out well for the Bulls, who scored a touchdown in their first drive. However, that first touchdown was their last of the half. The Buffalo offense and defense were completely exposed as the Cardinals score 21 unanswered points in the first half. Within 7 minutes of the third drive, Buffalo scored their second touchdown with a run by Branden Oliver. The kick attempt was blocked by Ball State's defense. The score remained 21–13 going into the fourth quarter. Within 2 minutes of the fourth quarter, Buffalo scored their third touchdown, but failed on their 2-point conversion. One drive later, and the Bulls scored their fourth touchdown, giving them a lead of 25–21 with 6 minutes remaining. This is when Ball State quarterback Keith Wenning took over the game. Buffalo's defense could not stop the Ball State juggernaut, even when they had a 4th down and 7, and a 4th down and 17. The Cardinals eventually scored their last touchdown with only 29 seconds on the clock. In the last 29 seconds of the game, Buffalo gained two first downs, but it wasn't enough to get a field goal. Ball State won, 28–25.

=== Connecticut ===
Team	1	2	3	4	Total
• Huskies	0	10	0	7	17
Bulls	0	3	0	0	3

- Date: September 24, 2011
- Location: UB Stadium
  Amherst, NY
- Game start: 6:00 p.m. EST
- Game attendance: 18,215
- Television network: Big East Network

As expected, both Buffalo's and Connecticut's offenses did not click early in the game. The Bulls made more first downs in the first quarter, but were not able to complete their drives. The Bulls took the lead in the second quarter with a field goal by Peter Fardon. Connecticut answered back quickly with a field goal of their own and a touchdown later in the quarter. The Bulls and Huskies went into halftime with a score of 3–10, Huskies leading. The third quarter was again hampered by strong defensive plays on both sides of the ball. Khalil Mack and Steven Means paired together to create impressive plays and sacks behind Connecticut's line of scrimmage. Buffalo's offense however, did not click to overcome Connecticut's strong defense, which was one of the best in the FBS. Connecticut scored another touchdown score in the fourth quarter to put away the game. The Huskies won, 17–3. The overall series record between the Bulls and Huskies is 4–15 with Connecticut leading.

=== Tennessee ===
Team	1	2	3	4	Total
Bulls	7	0	0	3	10
• Volunteers	17	14	7	3	41

- Date: October 1, 2011
- Location: Neyland Stadium
  Knoxville, TN
- Game start: 12:30 p.m. EST
- Game attendance: 87,758
- Television network: Comcast Sports Southeast, ESPN3

Going into the game as 30-point underdogs, Buffalo was weaker in every category than the Tennessee Volunteers. Tyler Bray threw for 342 yards against the Bulls, while Chazz Anderson of Buffalo threw for only 99 yards. Anderson though, broke for a 68-yard run to the end zone in the first quarter. However, the Volunteers never looked back, and scored 38 unanswered points. In the fourth quarter, Buffalo scored a field goal to make the score 38–10, but the Volunteers again answered with a field goal of their own.

=== Ohio ===
Team	1	2	3	4	Total
Bobcats	7	10	14	6	37
• Bulls	14	10	7	7	38

- Date: October 8, 2011
- Location: UB Stadium
  Amherst, NY
- Game start: 3:30 p.m. EST
- Game attendance: 15,051
- Television network: Time Warner Cable SportsNet

Buffalo came into the game as eight-point underdogs. After losing three straight games, the team knew they had to come back to their home field with a bang. Early in the first quarter, Bo Oliver rushed into the end zone from 12 yards out to give the Bulls a 7–0 lead. On the next drive for Ohio, Harden rushed 13 yards into the end zone to tie the score at seven. Oliver answered back with another rushing touchdown from 1 yard out. Halfway through the second quarter, Chazz Anderson found Alex Neutz to complete a 36-yard touchdown pass to push the Bulls advantage to 21–7. However, Ohio scored another touchdown with 5 minutes remaining in the half. Buffalo answered quickly with a field goal to make the score 24–14. One drive later, Ohio scored a field goal to make the score 24–17 at halftime. Within 3 minutes of the 3rd quarter, Ohio's Tyler Tettleton threw a 9-yard touchdown pass to tie the game at 24. A few drives later, and Ohio's LaVon Brazill burst for a 67-yard run that put the Bobcats up 31–24. Buffalo answered as Anderson completed a 90-yard touchdown pass to Ed Young that tied the score at 31 with 7:17 remaining in the third quarter. The Bobcats took the lead again with a 46-yard field goal by Matt Weller. With 5:45 remaining in the contest, Oliver rushed for his third touchdown, this time from one yard out to give Buffalo a 38–34 lead. The next drive, Weller made another field goal to inch the Bobcats closer 38–37. However, the Bulls defense however sealed the victory when Richie Smith sacked Tettleton on fourth down with less than two minutes remaining. The Bulls won, 38–37.

=== Temple ===
Team	1	2	3	4	Total
Bulls	0	0	0	0	0
• Owls	10	14	7	3	34

- Date: October 15, 2011
- Location: Lincoln Financial Field
  Philadelphia, PA
- Game start: 1:00 p.m. EST
- Game attendance: 25,820

Buffalo came into the game as 21 point underdogs. The offense and defense had a tough time against a Temple team that was made up of mostly seniors. Buffalo fell behind 24–0 at the half. The second half was just as devastating as the first half for the Bulls. Temple ran the ball multiple times to earn scores, and won 34–0.

=== Northern Illinois ===
Team	1	2	3	4	Total
• Huskies	3	14	14	0	31
Bulls	3	7	0	20	30

- Date: October 22, 2011
- Location: UB Stadium
  Amherst, NY
- Game start: 12:00 p.m. EST
- Game attendance: 13,370
- Television network: MAC TV, ESPN3

The Bulls started off well with good defense, holding the Huskies to only 3 points in the first quarter. However, the Huskies fought in the second quarter, scoring 14 points with rushing touchdowns. In the third quarter, the Huskies took a 31–10 lead over the Bulls. The Huskies defense shut down in the fourth quarter. The Bulls drove for over 300 yards to score 3 touchdowns. Within the last 15 seconds of the game, Buffalo score their third touchdown to make the score 31–30. Peter Fardon, the Bulls kicker, missed the point after to lose the game. This comeback would have been one of the greatest ever played by the Bulls. Senior quarterback Chazz Anderson, had an all-time record-breaking afternoon. He completed a school-record 35 passes (on 53 attempts, the fourth highest-total in school history) for a Division I-A record 404 yards, the eighth best total in school history.

=== Miami (OH) ===
Team	1	2	3	4	Total
Bulls	13	0	0	0	13
• RedHawks	21	7	13	0	41

- Date: October 29, 2011
- Location: Yager Stadium
  Oxford, OH
- Game start: 3:30 p.m. EST
- Game attendance:
- Television network: SportsTime Ohio

=== Eastern Michigan ===
Team	1	2	3	4	Total
Bulls	0	3	14	0	17
• Eagles	3	6	14	7	30

- Date: November 12, 2011
- Location: Rynearson Stadium
  Ypsilanti, MI
- Game start: 1:00 p.m. EST
- Game attendance: 3,830

=== Akron ===
Team	1	2	3	4	Total
Zips	3	0	0	7	10
• Bulls	14	16	14	7	51

- Date: November 19, 2011
- Location: UB Stadium
  Amherst, NY
- Game start: 12:00 p.m. EST
- Game attendance: 14,509
- Game weather: Mostly Cloudy, Windy
- Television network: TWCS

Brandon "Bo" Oliver rushed for 235 yards to not only lead the Bulls to their second conference win of the season, but also broke the single-game rushing yardage in UB history. Chazz Anderson threw for 19/25 with 155 yards on the day. Anderson threw 2 touchdowns, while Oliver ran for the other 2 touchdowns. Freshman, Patrick Clarke, nailed 3 field goals and 6 PAT's. At the beginning of the game, John Syty returned the first kickoff for 93 yards.

=== Bowling Green ===
Team	1	2	3	4	Total
• Falcons	7	14	21	0	42
Bulls	10	10	0	8	28

- Date: November 25, 2011
- Location: UB Stadium
  Amherst, NY
- Game start: 12:00 p.m. EST
- Television network: TWCS

== Roster ==
2011 Buffalo Bulls football football team roster
Players
Coaches
Offense

Pos.	#	Name	Class
RB	1	James Potts	Fr
WR	2	Marcus Rivers	Fr
QB	4	Jerry Davis	Jr
WR	5	Terrell Jackson	Sr
WR	6	Saron Hood	Jr
QB	8	Rudy Johnson	Fr
WR	10	Ed Young	Sr
QB	11	Cory Jorgensen	Sr
WR	11	Aaron Walters	Fr
TE	12	Alex Dennison	So
RB	13	Brandon Murie	So
QB	15	Alex Zordich	So
WR	18	Fred Lee	So
WR	19	Alex Neutz	So
RB	21	Jeffvon Gill	Jr
WR	25	John Dunmore	Fr
WR	26	Aaron Huber	Fr
RB	32	Branden Oliver	So
RB	43	Josh Fuller	So
OL	50	Andre Davis	Fr
OL	55	Graham Whinery	Jr
OL	56	Jasen Carlson	So
OL	65	Dillon Guy	Fr
OL	66	Jeff Veinotte	Fr
OL	67	Jake Silas	Fr
OL	70	Pat Wilson	So
OL	71	Trevor Sales	So
OL	75	Josh Violanti	Sr
OL	76	Anthony Bartholomew	Fr
OL	77	Gabriel Barde	Fr
OL	78	Matt Ostrowski	Sr
OL	79	Gokhan Ozkan	Jr
TE	80	Aaron Connacher	Sr
TE	81	Jimmy Gordon	So
WR	84	Derek Brim	So
WR	85	Cordero Dixon	Fr
WR	87	Devon Hughes	Fr
TE	88	Jake Reeder	Jr

Defense

Pos.	#	Name	Class
LB	3	Josh Copeland	Sr
DB	4	Cortney Lester	Fr
DB	8	Isaac Baugh	Sr
DB	9	Alan Hayes	Sr
DB	17	Joe Petit	Sr
DB	19	Daniel Gold	So
DB	20	Ray Anthony Long	Jr
LB	23	Delano Fabor	So
LB	24	Dalonte Wallace	Jr
LB	26	John Syty	Sr
DB	27	Kyle Sims	Fr
DB	28	Dwellie Striggles	Fr
DB	29	Adam Redden	So
DB	30	Okoye Houston	So
DB	31	Carlos Lammons	So
LB	33	Scott Pettigrew	Jr
LB	35	Mark Richardson	Jr
LB	36	Lee Skinner	Fr
LB	38	Witney Sherry	Fr
DB	39	Najja Johnson	So
DL	40	Steven Means	Jr
DB	41	Romel Dismuke	So
LB	42	Fred Branch	Sr
LB	44	Jaleel Verser	Sr
DL	45	Terry Peden	Jr
LB	46	Khalil Mack	So
LB	47	Imani Chatman	Jr
LB	48	Willie Moseley	Jr
DB	49	Keith Taken	Fr
LB	52	Jake Stockman	Fr
DL	54	Richie Smith	Sr
LB	59	Shaquille Dudley	So
DL	90	Kristjan Sokoli	Fr
DL	91	Dalton Barksdale	Fr
LB	92	Kendal Robinson	Fr
DL	95	Desmond Howard	Fr
DL	96	Colby Way	So
DL	97	Wyatt Cahill	Jr
DL	98	Rashad Jean	Jr
DL	99	Gordon DuBois	Sr

Special teams

Pos.	#	Name	Class
P, K	13	Peter Fardon	Jr
P	16	Jake Schum	Jr
LS	58	Tim Krantz	So
LS, DE	63	Ryan O'Sullivan	So

Head coach

- Jeff Quinn

Coordinators/assistant coaches

- William Inge – Defensive Coordinator
- Alex Wood – Offensive Coordinator
- Ernest Jones – Associate Head Coach
- Adam Shorter – Defensive Line

Legend

- (C) Team captain
- (S) Suspended
- (I) Ineligible
- Injured
- Redshirt

Roster
Last update: June 10, 2017
