= 2011 Central Michigan Chippewas football team =

American college football season

2011 Central Michigan Chippewas football
- Conference: Mid-American Conference
- West Division
- Record: 3–9 (2–6 MAC)
- Head coach: Dan Enos (2nd season)
- Offensive coordinator: Mike Cummings (2nd season)
- Defensive coordinator: Joe Tumpkin (2nd season)
- Home stadium: Kelly/Shorts Stadium

2011 Mid-American Conference football standings
	Conf.			Overall
Team	W		L	W		L
East Division
Ohio xy	6	–	2	10	–	4
Temple	5	–	3	9	–	4
Kent State	4	–	4	5	–	7
Bowling Green	3	–	5	5	–	7
Miami (OH)	3	–	5	4	–	8
Buffalo	2	–	6	3	–	9
Akron	0	–	8	1	–	11
West Division
Northern Illinois xy$	7	–	1	11	–	3
Toledo x	7	–	1	9	–	4
Western Michigan	5	–	3	7	–	6
Ball State	4	–	4	6	–	6
Eastern Michigan	4	–	4	6	–	6
Central Michigan	2	–	6	3	–	9
Championship: Northern Illinois 23, Ohio 20
$ – Conference champion; x – Division champion/co-champions; y – Championship game participant

The 2011 Central Michigan Chippewas football team represented Central Michigan University in the 2011 NCAA Division I FBS football season. The Chippewas were led by second year head coach Dan Enos and played their home games at Kelly/Shorts Stadium. They are a member of the West Division of the Mid-American Conference. They finished the season 3–9, 2–6 in MAC play for the second time in two years and finished last in the West Division.

== Schedule ==
Date	Time	Opponent	Site	TV	Result	Attendance	Source
September 1	7:00 pm	No. 23 (FCS) South Carolina State*	Kelly/Shorts Stadium; Mount Pleasant, MI		W 21–6	17,891	
September 10	12:00 pm	at Kentucky*	Commonwealth Stadium; Lexington, KY	ESPNU	L 13–27	58,022	
September 17	12:00 pm	at Western Michigan	Waldo Stadium; Kalamazoo, MI (rivalry)	ESPN Plus	L 14–44	26,674	
September 24	12:00 pm	at Michigan State*	Spartan Stadium; East Lansing, MI	ESPNU	L 7–45	72,119	
October 1	3:30 pm	Northern Illinois	Kelly/Shorts Stadium; Mount Pleasant, MI	ESPN3	W 48–41	16,539	
October 8	3:30 pm	at North Carolina State*	Carter–Finley Stadium; Raleigh, NC	ESPN3	L 24–38	54,388	
October 15	3:00 pm	Eastern Michigan^{†}	Kelly/Shorts Stadium; Mount Pleasant, MI (rivalry)		L 28–35	17,158	
October 22	2:00 pm	at Ball State	Scheumann Stadium; Muncie, IN		L 27–31	7,160	
October 29	12:00 pm	at Akron	InfoCision Stadium – Summa Field; Akron, OH	ESPN Plus	W 23–22	14,327	
November 4	6:00 pm	at Kent State	Dix Stadium; Kent, OH	ESPN2	L 21–24	10,132	
November 10	7:30 pm	Ohio	Kelly/Shorts Stadium; Mount Pleasant, MI	ESPNU	L 28–43	12,127	
November 18	8:00 pm	Toledo	Kelly/Shorts Stadium; Mount Pleasant, MI	ESPNU	L 17–44	12,741	
*Non-conference game; ^{†}Homecoming; Rankings from AP Poll released prior to the game; All times are in Eastern time
