= Ohio Bobcats football statistical leaders =

The Ohio Bobcats football statistical leaders are individual statistical leaders of the Ohio Bobcats football program in various categories, including passing, rushing, receiving, total offense, defensive stats, and kicking. Within those areas, the lists identify single-game, single-season, and career leaders. The Bobcats represent Ohio University in the NCAA's Mid-American Conference.

Although Ohio began competing in intercollegiate football in 1894, the school's official record book considers the "modern era" to have begun in 1950. Records from before this year are often incomplete and inconsistent, and they are generally not included in these lists.

These lists are dominated by more recent players for several reasons:

- Since 1950, seasons have increased from 10 games to 11 and then 12 games in length.
- The NCAA didn't allow freshmen to play varsity football until 1972 (with the exception of the World War II years), allowing players to have four-year careers.
- Bowl games only began counting toward single-season and career statistics in 2002. The Bobcats have played in nine bowl games since this decision, giving many recent players an extra game to accumulate statistics.
- Similarly, Ohio has played in the MAC Football Championship Game five times, giving yet another game for players in those seasons.

These lists are updated through the end of the 2025 season.

== Passing ==
=== Passing yards ===
Career
Rk	Player	Yards	Years
1	Tyler Tettleton	9,125	2009 2011 2012 2013
2	Kurtis Rourke	7,666	2019 2020 2021 2022 2023
3	Nathan Rourke	7,454	2017 2018 2019
4	Sammy Shon	5,412	1978 1979 1980 1981
5	Anthony Thornton	5,199	1987 1988 1989 1990
6	Parker Navarro	5,026	2022 2023 2024 2025
7	Boo Jackson	4,446	2008 2009 2010
8	Donny Harrison	3,856	1979 1980 1981 1982 1983
9	Austen Everson	3,586	2003 2004 2005 2006
10	Dennis Swearingen	3,475	1982 1983 1984 1985

Single season
Rk	Player	Yards	Year
1	Tyler Tettleton	3,302	2011
2	Kurtis Rourke	3,256	2022
3	Tyler Tettleton	2,851	2013
4	Tyler Tettleton	2,844	2012
5	Nathan Rourke	2,820	2019
6	Nathan Rourke	2,431	2018
7	Parker Navarro	2,423	2024
8	Parker Navarro	2,375	2025
9	Theo Scott	2,369	2009
10	Sammy Shon	2,366	1981

Single game
Rk	Player	Yards	Year	Opponent
1	Kurtis Rourke	537	2022	Fordham
2	Kurtis Rourke	427	2022	Akron
3	Donny Harrison	409	1983	Kent State
4	Andy Vetter	394	1977	Kent State
5	Greg Windham	393	2016	Texas State
6	Donny Harrison	380	1983	Bowling Green
7	Tyler Tettleton	375	2013	Eastern Michigan
8	Boo Jackson	365	2008	Central Michigan
9	Kurtis Rourke	362	2022	Miami (OH)
10	Dennis Swearingen	355	1985	Ball State

=== Passing touchdowns ===
Career
Rk	Player	TDs	Years
1	Tyler Tettleton	67	2009 2011 2012 2013
2	Nathan Rourke	60	2017 2018 2019
3	Kurtis Rourke	50	2019 2020 2021 2022 2023
4	Boo Jackson	38	2008 2009 2010
5	Parker Navarro	30	2022 2023 2024 2025
6	Cleve Bryant	29	1967 1968 1969
7	Theo Scott	26	2007 2008 2009
8	Sammy Shon	24	1978 1979 1980 1981
9	Derrius Vick	23	2012 2013 2014 2015
10	Bill Frederick	21	1951 1952 1953 1954

Single season
Rk	Player	TDs	Year
1	Tyler Tettleton	28	2011
2	Kurtis Rourke	25	2022
3	Nathan Rourke	23	2018
4	Tyler Tettleton	21	2013
5	Theo Scott	20	2009
	Nathan Rourke	20	2019
7	Boo Jackson	19	2008
8	Boo Jackson	18	2010
	Tyler Tettleton	18	2012
10	Nathan Rourke	17	2017

Single game
Rk	Player	TDs	Year	Opponent
1	Boo Jackson	5	2008	Akron
	Kurtis Rourke	5	2022	Buffalo
3	Cleve Bryant	4	1968	Richmond
	Derrius Vick	4	2012	Norfolk State
	Tyler Tettleton	4	2013	Eastern Michigan
	Kurtis Rourke	4	2022	Florida Atlantic
	Kurtis Rourke	4	2022	Fordham

== Rushing ==
=== Rushing yards ===
Career
Rk	Player	Yards	Years
1	Kalvin McRae	4,398	2004 2005 2006 2007
2	Steveland Hookfin	3,972	1995 1996 1997 1998
3	A. J. Ouellette	3,829	2014 2015 2016 2017 2018
4	Kareem Wilson	3,597	1995 1996 1997 1998
5	Sieh Bangura	3,374	2021 2022 2023 2025
6	Tim Curtis	2,995	1990 1991 1992 1993
7	Beau Blankenship	2,976	2011 2012 2013
8	Chad Brinker	2,826	1999 2000 2001 2002
9	Nathan Rourke	2,639	2017 2018 2019
10	Kevin Babcock	2,614	1976 1977 1978 1979

Single season
Rk	Player	Yards	Year
1	Beau Blankenship	1,604	2012
2	Kalvin McRae	1,434	2007
3	Sieh Bangura	1,392	2025
4	Steveland Hookfin	1,315	1998
5	A. J. Ouellette	1,306	2018
6	Kalvin McRae	1,252	2006
7	Anthony Tyus III	1,215	2024
8	Arnold Welcher	1,175	1975
9	Kalvin McRae	1,153	2005
10	Steveland Hookfin	1,125	1996

Single game
Rk	Player	Yards	Year	Opponent
1	Kareem Wilson	282	1996	Bowling Green
2	Dick Conley	275	1966	Marshall
3	Beau Blankenship	269	2012	UMass
4	Kalvin McRae	264	2005	Ball State
5	Arnold Welcher	257	1975	Marshall
6	Tim Worner	252	1972	Toledo
7	Arnold Welcher	247	1975	Western Michigan
8	Kalvin McRae	224	2005	Buffalo
9	Steveland Hookfin	222	1998	Northern Illinois
	Chris Garrett	222	2008	Miami (Ohio)

=== Rushing touchdowns ===
Career
Rk	Player	TDs	Years
1	Kareem Wilson	49	1995 1996 1997 1998
	Nathan Rourke	49	2017 2018 2019
3	Kalvin McRae	45	2004 2005 2006 2007
4	Sieh Bangura	37	2021 2022 2023 2025
5	A. J. Ouellette	32	2014 2015 2016 2017 2018
6	Steveland Hookfin	29	1995 1996 1997 1998
7	Chad Brinker	27	1999 2000 2001 2002
	Parker Navarro	27	2022 2023 2024 2025
9	Andy Vetter	25	1974 1975 1976 1977
10	Beau Blankenship	24	2011 2012 2013
	De'Montre Tuggle	24	2019 2020 2021

Single season
Rk	Player	TDs	Year
1	Nathan Rourke	21	2017
2	Kalvin McRae	19	2007
3	Parker Navarro	18	2024
4	Kalvin McRae	15	2006
	Beau Blankenship	15	2012
	Nathan Rourke	15	2018
	Sieh Bangura	15	2025
8	Kareem Wilson	14	1996
9	Andy Vetter	13	1976
	Kareem Wilson	13	1998
	Nathan Rourke	13	2019
	Sieh Bangura	13	2022

Single game
Rk	Player	TDs	Year	Opponent
1	Jim Albert	4	1963	Western Michigan
	Dick Conley	4	1966	Marshall
	Andy Vetter	4	1976	Northern Illinois
	Tim Curtis	4	1991	Kent State
	Kareem Wilson	4	1996	Bowling Green
	Chad Brinker	4	2002	Eastern Michigan
	Beau Blankenship	4	2012	Louisiana-Monroe
	Nathan Rourke	4	2018	Akron
	Rickey Hunt	4	2023	Georgia Southern
	Parker Navarro	4	2024	Eastern Michigan

== Receiving ==
=== Receptions ===
Career
Rk	Player	Rec	Years
1	LaVon Brazill	189	2007 2008 2009 2010
2	Donte Foster	167	2010 2011 2012 2013
3	Sebastian Smith	163	2013 2014 2015 2016
4	Taylor Price	145	2006 2007 2008 2009
5	Tom Compernolle	144	1983 1984 1985 1986
6	Todd Snyder	140	1967 1968 1969
7	Jordan Reid	133	2013 2014 2015 2016
8	Sam Wiglusz	129	2022 2023
9	Eddie Washington	127	1980 1981 1982 1983
10	Chase Hendricks	122	2023 2024 2025

Single season
Rk	Player	Rec	Year
1	Coleman Owen	78	2024
2	LaVon Brazill	74	2011
3	Sam Wiglusz	73	2022
4	Chase Hendricks	71	2025
5	Donte Foster	69	2013
6	Eddie Washington	68	1983
7	Sebastian Smith	65	2015
8	Todd Snyder	62	1969
9	Tom Compernolle	61	1986
10	Donte Foster	59	2012

Single game
Rk	Player	Rec	Year	Opponent
1	Taylor Price	14	2008	Wyoming
2	Todd Snyder	12	1969	Minnesota
	Cyle Feldman	12	1986	Central Michigan
	Bobby Cameron	12	1986	Kent State
	Chris Jackson	12	2004	Miami (Ohio)
	Jordan Reid	12	2016	Troy

=== Receiving yards ===
Career
Rk	Player	Yards	Years
1	Papi White	2,620	2014 2015 2016 2017 2018
2	LaVon Brazill	2,511	2007 2008 2009 2010 2011
3	Todd Snyder	2,241	1967 1968 1969
4	Donte Foster	2,180	2010 2011 2012 2013
5	Sebastian Smith	2,147	2013 2014 2015 2016
6	Taylor Price	2,019	2006 2007 2008 2009
7	Scott Mayle	1,847	2003 2004 2005 2006
8	Eddie Washington	1,761	1980 1981 1982 1983
9	Jordan Reid	1,658	2013 2014 2015 2016
10	Tom Compernolle	1,620	1983 1984 1985 1986

Single season
Rk	Player	Yards	Year
1	Coleman Owen	1,245	2024
2	LaVon Brazill	1,146	2011
3	Chase Hendricks	1,037	2025
4	Donte Foster	1,018	2013
5	Papi White	987	2018
6	Sebastian Smith	972	2016
7	Sam Wiglusz	877	2022
8	Eddie Washington	866	1983
9	Richard Hill	863	1991
10	Todd Snyder	835	1969

Single game
Rk	Player	Yards	Year	Opponent
1	Todd Snyder	214	1968	Richmond
2	Todd Snyder	203	1968	Dayton
3	Tom Compernolle	176	1986	Northern Illinois
4	Chris Jenkins	175	1993	Western Michigan
5	Jim Albert	169	1962	Iowa State
6	Dave Juenger	165	1970	Western Michigan
	LaVon Brazill	165	2011	Temple
8	Todd Snyder	164	1967	Kansas
	Donte Foster	164	2012	Eastern Michigan
10	Chase Cochran	162	2012	Louisiana-Monroe

=== Receiving touchdowns ===
Career
Rk	Player	TDs	Years
1	Donte Foster	21	2010 2011 2012 2013
2	Terrence McCrae	19	2007 2008 2009 2010
3	LaVon Brazill	18	2007 2008 2009 2010 2011
4	Todd Snyder	15	1967 1968 1969
5	Taylor Price	14	2006 2007 2008 2009
	Sam Wiglusz	14	2022 2023
7	Sebastian Smith	13	2013 2014 2015 2016
8	Tom Compernolle	12	1983 1984 1985 1986
	Andrew Mooney	12	2007 2008
	Jordan Reid	12	2013 2014 2015 2016

Single season
Rk	Player	TDs	Year
1	LaVon Brazill	11	2011
	Sam Wiglusz	11	2022
3	Andrew Mooney	9	2007
	Terrence McCrae	9	2009
	Terrence McCrae	9	2010
	Papi White	9	2018
7	Todd Snyder	8	1969
	Donte Foster	8	2012
	Coleman Owen	8	2024
10	Lou Sawchik	7	1953
	Bob Houmard	7	1968
	Donte Foster	7	2013
	Sebastian Smith	7	2015
	Chase Hendricks	7	2025

Single game
Rk	Player	TDs	Year	Opponent
1	Todd Snyder	3	1968	Richmond
	Todd Snyder	3	1969	Minnesota
	Dave Juenger	3	1972	Toledo
	Taylor Price	3	2008	Akron
	Donte Foster	3	2013	Miami (Ohio)

== Total offense ==
Total offense is the sum of passing and rushing statistics. It does not include receiving or returns.

=== Total offense yards ===
Career
Rk	Player	Yards	Years
1	Nathan Rourke	10,093	2017 2018 2019
2	Tyler Tettleton	10,027	2009 2011 2012 2013
3	Kurtis Rourke	8,498	2019 2020 2021 2022 2023
4	Parker Navarro	7,140	2022 2023 2024 2025
5	Anthony Thornton	6,753	1987 1988 1989 1990
6	Sammy Shon	6,262	1978 1979 1980 1981
7	Kareem Wilson	5,702	1995 1996 1997 1998
8	Boo Jackson	5,145	2008 2009 2010
9	Cleve Bryant	4,946	1967 1968 1969
10	Dontrell Jackson	4,653	1999 2000 2001 2002

Single season
Rk	Player	Yards	Year
1	Tyler Tettleton	3,960	2011
2	Nathan Rourke	3,687	2019
3	Kurtis Rourke	3,505	2022
4	Parker Navarro	3,477	2024
5	Nathan Rourke	3,291	2018
6	Parker Navarro	3,261	2025
7	Nathan Rourke	3,115	2017
8	Tyler Tettleton	3,088	2012
9	Tyler Tettleton	2,875	2013
10	Boo Jackson	2,688	2008

Single game
Rk	Player	Yards	Year	Opponent
1	Kurtis Rourke	582	2022	Fordham
2	Kurtis Rourke	459	2022	Akron
3	Greg Windham	430	2016	Texas State
4	Nathan Rourke	421	2019	Kent State
5	Boo Jackson	413	2008	Central Michigan
6	Sammy Shon	395	1980	Eastern Michigan
7	Theo Scott	393	2009	Temple
8	Donny Harrison	386	1983	Kent State
9	Tyler Tettleton	385	2013	Eastern Michigan
10	Parker Navarro	383	2024	Eastern Michigan

=== Total touchdowns ===
Career
Rk	Player	TDs	Years
1	Nathan Rourke	111	2017 2018 2019
2	Tyler Tettleton	82	2009 2011 2012 2013
3	Kareem Wilson	66	1995 1996 1997 1998
4	Kurtis Rourke	61	2019 2020 2021 2022 2023
5	Parker Navarro	57	2022 2023 2024 2025
6	Cleve Bryant	49	1967 1968 1969
7	Boo Jackson	47	2008 2009 2010
8	Kalvin McRae	45	2004 2005 2006 2007
9	Andy Vetter	44	1974 1975 1976 1977
10	Sammy Shon	41	1978 1979 1980 1981

Single season
Rk	Player	TDs	Year
1	Tyler Tettleton	38	2011
	Nathan Rourke	38	2017
	Nathan Rourke	38	2018
4	Nathan Rourke	33	2019
5	Parker Navarro	31	2024
6	Kurtis Rourke	29	2022
7	Boo Jackson	26	2010
8	Theo Scott	23	2009
	Parker Navarro	23	2025
10	Cleve Bryant	22	1968
	Tyler Tettleton	22	2012

Single game
Rk	Player	TDs	Year	Opponent
1	Andy Vetter	7	1976	Northern Illinois
2	Nathan Rourke	6	2017	Miami (OH)
3	Boo Jackson	5	2008	Akron
	Theo Scott	5	2009	Temple
	Nathan Rourke	5	2019	Western Michigan
	Nathan Rourke	5	2019	Akron
	Kurtis Rourke	5	2022	Florida Atlantic
	Kurtis Rourke	5	2022	Fordham
	Kurtis Rourke	5	2022	Buffalo
	Parker Navarro	5	2024	Ball State

== Defense ==
=== Interceptions ===
Career
Rk	Player	Ints	Years
1	Joe Callan	18	1975 1976 1977 1978 1979
2	Bop White	17	1999 2000 2001 2002
3	Bert Dampier	13	1970 1971 1972
	T. J. Wright	13	2003 2004 2005 2006
5	Mike Schott	12	1967 1968 1969
6	Jim McKenna	11	1947 1948 1949
	Bill Frederick	11	1952 1953 1954
	Bill Mitchell	11	1968 1969 1970
	Tevell Jones	11	1994 1995 1996 1997
10	Vincent Short	10	1977 1978 1979 1980
	Dion Byrum	10	2002 2003 2004 2005

Single season
Rk	Player	Ints	Year
1	Joe Callan	9	1979
2	Jim McKenna	7	1949
	John Dickason	7	1960
	Tevell Jones	7	1997
5	Tom Ascani	6	1952
	Bop White	6	2002
	Dion Byrum	6	2005
	Gerald Moore	6	2009

Single game
Rk	Player	Ints	Year	Opponent
1	Pat Connelly	3	1948	Butler
	Paul Winemiller	3	1949	Kent State
	Bill Frederick	3	1953	Morris Harvey
	Joe Callan	3	1976	Northern Illinois
	Joe Callan	3	1979	Cincinnati
	Joe Callan	3	1979	Eastern Michigan
	Eric Edwards	3	1982	Richmond
	Roger Smith	3	1987	Marshall
	Tevell Jones	3	1997	Bowling Green
	Quentin Poling	3	2014	Idaho

=== Tackles ===
Career
Rk	Player	Tackles	Years
1	Mike Mangen	513	1981 1982 1983 1984
2	Benny King	462	1992 1993 1994 1995
3	Brian Mays	458	1982 1983 1984 1985
4	Bill Garrett	450	1986 1987 1988 1989
5	Jabaar Thompson	447	1992 1993 1994 1995
6	Noah Keller	438	2007 2008 2009 2010 2011
7	Tedd Lucas	418	1976 1977 1978 1979
8	Doug Mangen	404	1984 1985 1986 1987
9	Scott Zele	388	1990 1991 1992
10	Quentin Poling	373	2014 2015 2016 2017

Single season
Rk	Player	Tackles	Year
1	David Terry	177	1988
2	Mike Mangen	171	1983
3	Jack LeVeck	169	1971
4	Frank Komar	159	1980
	David Terry	159	1989
	Jabaar Thompson	159	1994
7	Benny King	158	1993
8	Noah Keller	155	2009
9	Brian Mays	154	1985
	Bill Garrett	154	1988

Single game
Rk	Player	Tackles	Year	Opponent
1	David Terry	29	1989	Eastern Michigan
2	Benny King	23	1993	Ball State
3	Benny King	22	1993	Akron
4	Jabaar Thompson	21	1994	Utah State
5	Jabaar Thompson	20	1993	Akron
6	Benny King	19	1993	Bowling Green
	Chris London	19	2000	Akron
	Quentin Poling	19	2017	UMass
9	Jabaar Thompson	18	1993	Kent State
	Jabaar Thompson	18	1994	Eastern Michigan
	Michael Molnar	18	2026	Eastern Michigan

=== Sacks ===
Career
Rk	Player	Sacks	Years
1	Tarell Basham	29.5	2013 2014 2015 2016
2	Andre Jackson	19.0	1995 1996 1997
3	Jameson Hartke	17.5	2005 2006 2007 2008
4	Jason Carthen	17.0	1990 1991 1992
5	Bradley Weaver	14.5	2021 2022 2023 2024
6	Rahim Slaise	14.0	1996 1997 1998
	Leigh Barbour	14.0	1996 1997 1998 1999
8	John Kraus	13.0	1996 1997 1998 1999
9	Casey Sayles	12.5	2013 2014 2015 2016
10	Ed Shy	12.0	1986 1987 1988 1989
	Quentin Poling	12.0	2014 2015 2016 2017

Single season
Rk	Player	Sacks	Year
1	Tarell Basham	11.5	2016
2	Jason Carthen	9.0	1992
3	Bradley Weaver	8.5	2024
4	Tom Kutz	8.0	1987
	Jason Carthen	8.0	1991
	Mario Daniel	8.0	1996
7	Jameson Hartke	7.5	2006
	Tarell Basham	7.5	2013
9	John Guznik	7.0	1985
	Andre Jackson	7.0	1997
	Rahim Slaise	7.0	1998

Single game
Rk	Player	Sacks	Year	Opponent
1	Andre Jackson	3.0	1996	Toledo
	Bobby Holloway	3.0	1996	Hawaii
	Mario Daniel	3.0	1996	Ball State
	Dak Notestine	3.0	2009	Bowling Green
	Stafford Gatling	3.0	2010	Louisiana-Lafayette
	Nic Barber	3.0	2011	New Mexico State
	Jay Crable	3.0	2025	Bowling Green

== Kicking ==
=== Field goals made ===
Career
Rk	Player	FGs	Years
1	Matt Weller	80	2009 2010 2011 2012
2	Louie Zervos	73	2016 2017 2018 2019
3	Josiah Yazdani	47	2013 2014 2015
4	Kevin Kerr	38	1999 2000 2001 2002
5	Gianni Spetic	31	2023 2024
6	Gary Homer	28	1972 1973 1974 1975
	Steve Green	28	1976 1977 1978 1979
8	Ron Harter	25	1980 1981 1982 1983
	Chris Judge	25	1984 1985 1986
	Jeff Marchant	25	1990 1991 1992 1993

Single season
Rk	Player	FGs	Year
1	Louie Zervos	29	2016
2	Matt Weller	25	2011
3	Matt Weller	23	2012
4	Nathanial Vakos	22	2022
5	Matt Weller	21	2009
6	Michael Braunstein	20	2007
7	Gianni Spetic	18	2023
8	Josiah Yazdani	17	2014
9	Josiah Yazdani	16	2015
	Louie Zervos	16	2019
	Stephen Johnson	16	2021

Single game
Rk	Player	FGs	Year	Opponent
1	Matt Weller	5	2011	Bowling Green
	Louie Zervos	5	2016	Kansas
3	Michael Braunstein	4	2007	Wyoming
	Barrett Way	4	2008	Kent State
	Louie Zervos	4	2016	Texas State
	Louie Zervos	4	2016	Tennessee
	Nathanial Vakos	4	2022	Western Michigan

=== Field goal percentage ===
Career
Rk	Player	FG%	Years
1	Michael Braunstein	83.3%	2007
2	Nathanial Vakos	81.5%	2022
3	Louie Zervos	81.1%	2016 2017 2018 2019
4	Josiah Yazdani	74.6%	2013 2014 2015
5	Matt Weller	74.1%	2009 2010 2011 2012
6	Gianni Spetic	73.8%	2023 2024
7	Matt Lasher	72.2%	2005 2006
8	Chris Judge	71.4%	1984 1985 1986
	Mike Fultz	71.4%	1984 1985 1986 1987
	Jim Delverne	71.4%	1988 1989

Single season
Rk	Player	FG%	Year
1	Josiah Yazdani	93.3%	2013
2	Jim Delverne	84.6%	1989
3	Michael Braunstein	83.3%	2007
	Louie Zervos	83.3%	2017
5	Louie Zervos	82.9%	2016
6	Ron Harter	81.8%	1981
7	Nathanial Vakos	81.5%	2022
8	Gianni Spetic	81.3%	2024
9	Louie Zervos	80.0%	2019
10	Matt Weller	78.6%	2010
