= List of Ohio Bobcats football seasons =

The following is a list of Ohio Bobcats football seasons for the football team that has represented Ohio University in NCAA competition.

== Seasons ==
Year	Coach	Overall	Conference	Standing	Bowl/playoffs	Coaches^{#}	AP^{°}
1894	No coach	0–1					
Harvey Deme (Independent) (1895)
1895	Harvey Deme	2–3					
Harvey Deme:		2–3					
Frank Remsburg (Independent) (1896)
1896	Frank Remsburg	4–2–1					
Frank Remsburg:		4–2–1					
Warwick Ford (Independent) (1897)
1897	Warwick Ford	7–2					
Warwick Ford:		7–2					
Peter McLaren (Independent) (1898)
1898	Peter McLaren	1–3					
Peter McLaren:		1–3					
Fred Sullivan (Independent) (1899)
1899	Fred Sullivan	2–2					
Fred Sullivan (first stint):		2–2					
Karl Core (Independent) (1900)
1900	Karl Core	2–4–1					
Karl Core:		2–4–1					
Arlie C. Jones (Independent) (1901)
1901	Arlie C. Jones	6–1–2					
Arlie C. Jones:		6–1–2					
Harold Monosmith (Independent) (1902)
1902	Harold Monosmith	0–6–1					
Harold Monosmith:		0–6–1					
Fred Sullivan (Independent) (1903)
1903	Fred Sullivan	2–4					
Fred Sullivan (total):		4–6					
Henry Hart (Independent) (1904)
1904	Henry Hart	2–4–1					
Henry Hart:		2–4–1					
Joseph Railsback (Independent) (1905)
1905	Joseph Railsback	2–5–2					
Joseph Railsback:		2–5–2					
Arthur McFarland (Independent) (1906–1908)
1906	Arthur McFarland	7–1					
1907	Arthur McFarland	3–4–1					
1908	Arthur McFarland	3–5					
Arthur McFarland:		13–10–1					
Robert Wood (Independent) (1909–1910)
1909	Robert Wood	2–4–2					
1910	Robert Wood	0–6–1					
Robert Wood:		2–10–3					
Arthur Hinaman (Independent) (1911–1912)
1911	Arthur Hinaman	3–3–2					
1912	Arthur Hinaman	1–7–1					
Arthur Hinaman:		4–10–3					
M. B. Banks (Ohio Athletic Conference) (1913–1917)
1913	M. B. Banks	2–5–1	1–3	10th			
1914	M. B. Banks	4–4	4–3	5th			
1915	M. B. Banks	8–1	2–1	T–4th			
1916	M. B. Banks	5–2–1	4–1–1	4th			
1917	M. B. Banks	3–5	3–3	T–6th			
M. B. Banks:		22–17–2	14–11–1				
Frank Gullum (Ohio Athletic Conference) (1918–1919)
1918	Frank Gullum	4–0–1	1–0–1	6th			
1919	Frank Gullum	3–5	2–4	11th			
Frank Gullum:		7–5–1	3–4–1				
Russ Finsterwald (Ohio Athletic Conference) (1920–1922)
1920	Russ Finsterwald	4–3	1–3	14th			
1921	Russ Finsterwald	4–4–1	1–1	T–9th			
1922	Russ Finsterwald	5–3	3–1	5th			
Russ Finsterwald:		13–10–1	5–5				
John C. Heldt (Ohio Athletic Conference) (1923)
1923	John C. Heldt	3–5–1	2–4–1	14th			
John C. Heldt:		3–5–1	2–4–1				
Don Peden (Ohio Athletic Conference) (1924–1925)
1924	Don Peden	4–4	2–4	14th			
1925	Don Peden	6–2	3–2	T–8th			
Don Peden (Ohio Athletic Conference / Buckeye Athletic Association) (1926–1927)
1926	Don Peden	5–2–1	4–2–1 / 2–1–1	T–8th / 3rd			
1927	Don Peden	4–2–2	3–1–2 / 1–1–2	T–7th / 4th			
Don Peden (Buckeye Athletic Association) (1928–1938)
1928	Don Peden	6–3	2–3	T–4th			
1929	Don Peden	9–0	5–0	1st			
1930	Don Peden	8–0–1	4–0	1st			
1931	Don Peden	7–1	4–0	1st			
1932	Don Peden	7–2	3–1	2nd			
1933	Don Peden	6–2–1	3–1–1	3rd			
1934	Don Peden	4–4–1	1–2–1	4th			
1935	Don Peden	8–0	5–0	1st			
1936	Don Peden	5–2–1	3–1–1	T–1st			
1937	Don Peden	5–3–1	3–1–1	3rd			
1938	Don Peden	7–2	3–1	T–1st			
Don Peden (Independent) (1939–1945)
1939	Don Peden	6–3					
1940	Don Peden	5–2–2					
1941	Don Peden	5–2–1					
1942	Don Peden	5–3					
1943–44	No team - WWII						
1945	Don Peden	3–4					
Don Peden (Mid-American Conference) (1946)
1946	Don Peden	6–3	0–1	T–3rd			
Don Peden:		121–46–11	48–20–7				
Harold Wise (Mid-American Conference) (1947–1948)
1947	Harold Wise	3–5–1	1–3	T–3rd			
1948	Harold Wise	3–6	2–3	4th			
Harold Wise:		6–11–1	3–6				
Carroll Widdoes (Mid-American Conference) (1949–1957)
1949	Carroll Widdoes	4–4–1	2–2–1	3rd			
1950	Carroll Widdoes	6–4	2–2	3rd			
1951	Carroll Widdoes	5–4–1	2–2	4th			
1952	Carroll Widdoes	6–2–1	5–2	3rd			
1953	Carroll Widdoes	6–2–1	5–0–1	1st			
1954	Carroll Widdoes	6–3	5–2	2nd			
1955	Carroll Widdoes	5–4	3–3	4th			
1956	Carroll Widdoes	2–7	2–4	T–4th			
1957	Carroll Widdoes	2–6–1	1–4–1	T–5th			
Carroll Widdoes:		42–36–5	27–21–3				
Bill Hess (Mid-American Conference) (1958–1977)
1958	Bill Hess	5–4	2–4	T–4th			
1959	Bill Hess	7–2	4–2	2nd			
1960 (Note: Small College National Champions)	Bill Hess	10–0	6–0	1st		1 (Note: Rankings from the UPI coaches small college poll)	1 (Note: Rankings from the AP small college poll)
1961	Bill Hess	5–3–1	3–2–1	4th			
1962	Bill Hess	8–3	5–1	2nd	L Sun		
1963	Bill Hess	6–4	5–1	1st			
1964	Bill Hess	5–4–1	3–2–1	4th			
1965	Bill Hess	0–10	0–6	7th			
1966	Bill Hess	5–5	3–3	4th			
1967	Bill Hess	6–4	5–1	T–1st			
1968	Bill Hess	10–1	6–0	1st	L Tangerine	18	20
1969	Bill Hess	5–4–1	2–3	T–3rd			
1970	Bill Hess	4–5	3–2	T–2nd			
1971	Bill Hess	5–5	2–3	T–3rd			
1972	Bill Hess	3–8	1–4	6th			
1973	Bill Hess	5–5	2–3	T–3rd			
1974	Bill Hess	6–5	3–2	T–2nd			
1975	Bill Hess	5–5–1	2–4	T–5th			
1976	Bill Hess	7–4	6–2	T–2nd			
1977	Bill Hess	1–10	0–8	10th			
Bill Hess:		108–91–4	63–52–2				
Bob Kappes (Mid-American Conference) (1978)
1978	Bob Kappes	3–8	3–5	T–5th			
Bob Kappes:		3–8	3–5				
Brian Burke (Mid-American Conference) (1979–1984)
1979	Brian Burke	6–5	4–4	T–4th			
1980	Brian Burke	6–5	5–4	T–5th			
1981	Brian Burke	5–6	5–4	T–5th			
1982	Brian Burke	6–5	5–4	T–5th			
1983	Brian Burke	4–7	3–6	8th			
1984	Brian Burke	4–6–1	4–4–1	4th			
Brian Burke:		31–34–1	26–26–1				
Cleve Bryant (Mid-American Conference) (1985–1989)
1985	Cleve Bryant	2–9	2–7	10th			
1986	Cleve Bryant	1–10	0–8	10th			
1987	Cleve Bryant	1–10	0–8	9th			
1988	Cleve Bryant	4–6–1	4–3–1	5th			
1989	Cleve Bryant	1–9–1	1–6–1	8th			
Cleve Bryant:		9–44–2	7–32–2				
Tom Lichtenberg (Mid-American Conference) (1990–1994)
1990	Tom Lichtenberg	1–9–1	0–7–1	9th			
1991	Tom Lichtenberg	2–8–1	1–6–1	8th			
1992	Tom Lichtenberg	1–10	1–7	T–9th			
1993	Tom Lichtenberg	4–7	4–5	6th			
1994	Tom Lichtenberg	0–11	0–9	10th			
Tom Lichtenberg:		8–45–2	6–34–2				
Jim Grobe (Mid-American Conference) (1995–2000)
1995	Jim Grobe	2–8–1	1–6–1	9th			
1996	Jim Grobe	6–6	5–3	4th			
1997	Jim Grobe	8–3	6–2	T–2nd (East)			
1998	Jim Grobe	5–6	5–3	T–3rd (East)			
1999	Jim Grobe	5–6	5–3	T–3rd (East)			
2000	Jim Grobe	7–4	5–3	T–3rd (East)			
Jim Grobe:		33–33–1	27–20–1				
Brian Knorr (Mid-American Conference) (2001–2004)
2001	Brian Knorr	1–10	1–7	7th (East)			
2002	Brian Knorr	4–8	4–4	4th (East)			
2003	Brian Knorr	2–10	1–7	T–6th (East)			
2004	Brian Knorr	4–7	2–6	T–5th (East)			
Brian Knorr:		11–35	8–24				
Frank Solich (Mid-American Conference) (2005–2020)
2005	Frank Solich	4–7	3–5	4th (East)			
2006	Frank Solich	9–5	7–1	1st (East)	L GMAC		
2007	Frank Solich	6–6	4–4	T–4th (East)			
2008	Frank Solich	4–8	3–5	T–4th (East)			
2009	Frank Solich	9–5	7–1	1st (East)	L Little Caesars		
2010	Frank Solich	8–5	6–2	2nd (East)	L New Orleans		
2011	Frank Solich	10–4	6–2	1st (East)	W Famous Idaho Potato		
2012	Frank Solich	9–4	4–4	3rd (East)	W Independence		
2013	Frank Solich	7–6	4–4	T–3rd (East)	L Beef 'O' Brady's		
2014	Frank Solich	6–6	4–4	2nd (East)			
2015	Frank Solich	8–5	5–3	T–2nd (East)	L Camellia		
2016	Frank Solich	8–6	6–2	T–1st (East)	L Dollar General		
2017	Frank Solich	9–4	5–3	2nd (East)	W Bahamas		
2018	Frank Solich	9–4	6–2	T–2nd (East)	W Frisco		
2019	Frank Solich	7–6	5–3	T–2nd (East)	W Famous Idaho Potato		
2020	Frank Solich	2–1	2–1	T–3rd (East)			
Frank Solich:		115–82	77–46				
Tim Albin (Mid-American Conference) (2021–2024)
2021	Tim Albin	3–9	3–5	3rd (East)			
2022	Tim Albin	10–4	7–1	1st (East)	W Arizona		
2023	Tim Albin	10–3	6–2	2nd (East)	W Myrtle Beach		
2024	Tim Albin (Note: Albin resigned before the bowl game) / Brian Smith	11–3	7–1	T–1st	W Cure		
Tim Albin:		33–19	23–9				
Brian Smith (Mid-American Conference) (2025)
2025	Brian Smith (Note: Smith was terminated before the bowl game) / John Hauser	9–4	6–2	T–2nd	W Frisco		
Brian Smith:		9–4	6–2				
John Hauser (Mid-American Conference) (2026–present)
2026	John Hauser	0–0	0–0				
John Hauser:		1–0	0–0				
Total:		623–591–48 (.513)					
National championship Conference title Conference division title or championship game berth
