= 2013 Beef 'O' Brady's Bowl =

- 6th Beef 'O' Brady's Bowl
Ohio Bobcats	East Carolina Pirates
(7–5)	(9–3)
MAC	C-USA
20	37
Head coach: Frank Solich	Head coach: Ruffin McNeill
	1	2	3	4	Total
Ohio	0	14	3	3	20
East Carolina	14	3	0	20	37
- Date: December 23, 2013
- Season: 2013
- Stadium: Tropicana Field
- Location: St. Petersburg, Florida
- Favorite: E. Carolina by 14
- Referee: Rick Loumiet (Mtn. West)
- Attendance: 20,053

United States TV coverage
- Network: ESPN/ESPN Radio
- Announcers: TV: Beth Mowins (play by play), Joey Galloway (analyst), Paul Carcaterra (sideline); Radio: Eamon McAnaney (play-by-play), Anthony Becht (analyst), and Ian Fitzsimmons (sideline).

The 2013 Beef 'O' Brady's Bowl was an American college football bowl game that was played on December 23, 2013, at Tropicana Field in St. Petersburg, Florida. Sponsored by the Beef 'O' Brady's restaurant franchise, it was the sixth edition of the game formerly known as the St. Petersburg Bowl. It featured the Ohio Bobcats of the Mid-American Conference against the East Carolina Pirates of Conference USA. It was one of the 2013–14 bowl games that concluded the 2013 FBS football season. The game began at 2:00 p.m. EST and aired on ESPN. East Carolina defeated Ohio, 37–20, by scoring 20 points in the fourth quarter.

== Teams ==
This was the first Beef 'O' Brady's Bowl for both Ohio and East Carolina. It was the third meeting between the two schools, both of the previous of which East Carolina won, the most recent of which occurred in 1998. It was the last time a team from the Mid-American Conference went to the game, as the third tie-in will go to the Atlantic Coast Conference from 2014 until at least 2019.

The game had an attendance of 20, 053.

== Pregame buildup ==
East Carolina was heavily favored to win the game, including predictions from all six CBS Sports panelists, ESPN writers, Bleacher Report, and Dr. Saturday, a feature from Yahoo Sports, as Ohio had fallen apart in the latter half of the season, and ECU's offense was very explosive offensively. One Yahoo Sports preview commented that it was a strength on strength game: "It's a game of strength vs. strength. East Carolina's passing attack is ranked 11th in the country at 331 yards per game. Ohio has given up 212 passing yards per game. The Bobcats are much worse against the run, but East Carolina runs the ball poorly. The Pirates are 101st in the nation in rushing offense ... I like ECU's strength much more than I like Ohio's strength."

=== Ohio ===
The Bobcats continued their recent winning ways, finishing 7–5 overall and 4–4 in-conference (tied with the Akron Zips for third place in the MAC East Division). After their season, bowl director Brett Dulaney extended an invitation to play in the game. After starting their season 4–1 (the loss in the opener to number nine Louisville), the Bobcats lost a close game against Central Michigan, and then won two more games before losing three consecutive games, including being shut out 49–0 against Bowling Green, before resoundingly defeating UMass in their season's final game. In addition to being the Ohio's first Beef 'O' Brady's Bowl and their fifth consecutive bowl game.

==== Offense ====
Coordinated by Tim Albin, Ohio's offense, which averaged 238.5 passing yards per game (58th in FBS), 136.3 rushing yards per game (96th in FBS), and 28.0 points per game (72nd in FBS), relied heavily on senior quarterback Tyler Tettleton – in games during which he threw for more than 200 yards, Ohio was 6–1, but when he did not, they were just 1–4. His up-and-down season totaled 2623 passing yards, 20 touchdowns, and 9 interceptions. Sophomore Derrius Vick also contributed, predominantly as a rushing quarterback, totaling 28 rushes for 68 yards and 1 touchdown. Leading the Bobcats' rushing attack, however, was senior Beau Blankenship, who "trudged through a letdown of a season" after entering the season with significant hype; he ultimately totaled 844 rushing yards and 5 touchdowns, eclipsing 100 yards in a game just twice. The backup was fellow senior Ryan Boykin, who rushed for 399 yards and a team-leading 7 rushing touchdowns. Sophomore Daz'mond Patterson was also a contributor in both the rushing and receiving games.

The Bobcats' leading receiver was second team all-conference honoree Donte Foster, who caught 63 passes for 858 yards and 6 touchdowns. Upperclassmen wide receivers Chase Cochran and Matt Waters were second and third respectively in receiving yards, recording 656 and 446 respectively. At tight end, senior Troy Hill caught 19 passes for 253 yards and 2 touchdowns. Walk-on sophomore Josiah Yazdani took over the kicking duties a few games into the season, and was a perfect 12 of 12 on his field goal tries (with a long of 49 yards), one of only four FBS kickers to be perfect, and 28 of 28 on his extra point attempts; he achieved second team all-conference honors. Ohio's offensive line was anchored by fifth-year seniors Jon Lechner, a right guard, and Ryan McGrath, a right tackle.

=== East Carolina ===
The Pirates continued their recent success, finishing 9–3 overall and 6–2 in-conference, but their "devastating" 59–28 loss to the Marshall Thundering Herd kept them from the 2013 Conference USA Football Championship Game, and dampened their overall season success. At season's end, bowl director Brett Dulaney extended an invitation to play in the game. In addition to being the East Carolina's first Beef 'O' Brady's Bowl, it was also the Pirates' final game as a member of Conference USA before moving to the American Athletic Conference as part of the 2010–13 Big East Conference realignment.

== Game summary ==
=== Broadcast ===
Broadcast on ESPN, Beth Mowins handled the play-by-play duties, Joey Galloway was the analyst, and Paul Carcaterra was the sideline reporter. On ESPN Radio, the game's broadcasters were Eamon McAnaney (play-by-play), Anthony Becht (analyst), and Ian Fitzsimmons (sideline).

=== First quarter ===
East Carolina (ECU) got the ball to start the game, and promptly went three-and-out, ultimately punting. Ohio achieved a few first downs, however quarterback Tyler Tettleton threw an interception to Michael Dobson, setting ECU up with good field position around midfield. On the ensuing possession, ECU drove down the field on 5 plays for 55 yards, with the drive culminating in a 5-yard pass from Shane Carden to Cam Worthy, taking a 7–0 lead. Ohio failed to respond, and punted on their next drive. When ECU regained possession of the ball, they embarked on a drive that was highlighted by a 39-yard rush by Vintavious Cooper, as well as a 15-yard pass to Justin Hardy on which he broke the career receiving yard record, but failed to score when Ohio stopped ECU on a fourth down conversion attempt in the red zone. Ohio could not capitalize, and ultimately punted. ECU subsequently embarked on an 11-play drive that covered 76-yards and took up 3:40, and culminated with a 2-yard run by Breon Allen for a touchdown. Ohio's offense finally came to life on their next drive, which culminated in the second quarter.

=== Second quarter ===
At the end of the first quarter, Ohio embarked on a drive during which they gained 26 yards on a flea flicker pass from Tettleton to Daz'mond Patterson, gained 15 more thanks to a personal foul on ECU, and then scored on a 17-yard swing pass from Tettleton to Patterson, making the score 14–7 ECU. ECU's offense took the field and used predominantly a no huddle offense that once caused an illegal substitution penalty on Ohio, however they committed a delay of game penalty when there was confusion on a play call. On that drive, they stalled around midfield and punted for a touchback. Ohio's subsequent drive lasted only one play – an 80-yard touchdown pass from Derrius Vick, Ohio's second quarterback, whom they previously used predominantly for running, to Donte Foster that tied the game at 14. As happened in the first quarter, ECU stalled in the red zone on their ensuing drive, failing to convert a fourth down, but Ohio went three-and-out, thus negating their momentum. ECU, relying predominantly on their running game (seven of nine plays) again approached scoring territory, but when faced with a 3rd down and 15, failed to convert the first down, and settled for a field goal try for Warren Harvey, who made a 41-yard attempt, taking the lead for the Pirates, 17–14.

=== Third quarter ===
Ohio received the opening second half kickoff, but failed to avenge the first half time of possession deficit (ECU possessed the ball for more than 20 of the 30 minutes in the first half), and quickly punted the ball to ECU, but the Pirates also punted after an ineffective series. On Ohio's ensuing drive, Tettleton took off running on one play, and exited the game with an apparent ankle injury; Vick subsequently entered the game for one play before Tettleton's return. Later on the drive, Ohio converted a fourth down to advance into the red zone; Josiah Yazdani subsequently attempted a 29-yard field goal, which he made, tying the game, to culminate a 16-play, 60-yard drive. After exchanging punts, ECU advanced into Ohio territory on a drive highlighted by a 37-yard pass from Carden to Worthy, but that was decimated once deep in Ohio's territory by a chop block penalty, ultimately forcing the Pirates to settle for a 29-yard field goal attempt that Harvey missed wide right. At the end of the quarter, the game was tied at 17.

=== Fourth quarter ===
Early in the quarter, Ohio took its first lead of the game when Yazdani made a 28-yard field goal that culminated a 6-play, 69-yard drive. They surprised ECU on the ensuing kickoff, by attempting an onside kick, which they recovered around midfield. On their subsequent drive, Ohio drove down the field, but stalled around the 30-yard line, and settled for a 45-yard field goal attempt for Yazdani, which he missed, his first miss of the season. On the ensuing drive, ECU took advantage of two 15-yard penalties on Ohio (a personal foul and a pass interference), and Cooper rushed for a touchdown, putting ECU back on top, 24–20. Ohio failed to move the ball on their next drive, and their punt was fair caught in their own territory, setting ECU up with excellent field position, from which they embarked on a drive that culminated when, on a trick play, Carden caught a 14-yard touchdown pass from Worthy, putting ECU up 31–20. Tettleton threw an interception on Ohio's ensuing drive that again set up ECU in Ohio's territory, however this time, they did not convert a third down when at their 38-yard line, after which they took a delay of game penalty to give ECU five more yards' room to pin Ohio deep on the punt, but only managed to pin them at their own 16-yard line. On Ohio's next drive, Tettleton rushed for 17 yards on 3rd and 16 to convert for a first down, however on the following series, Tettleton threw another interception; on the return, Ohio committed a personal foul, giving ECU another drive to start in Ohio's territory. Cooper subsequently rushed for a 22-yard touchdown, giving him 198 rushing yards on the day, a career-best. The extra point was blocked, and as such, the game's final score was 37–20.

=== Scoring summary ===
Scoring summary

Quarter	Time	Drive			Team	Scoring information	Score	
Quarter	Time	Plays	Yards	TOP	Team	Scoring information	Ohio	East Carolina
1	10:45	5	55	1:51	ECU	Cam Worthy 5-yard touchdown reception from Shane Carden, Warren Harvey kick good	0	7
1	0:27	11	76	3:40	ECU	Breon Allen 2-yard touchdown run, Harvey kick good	0	14
2	14:39	4	74	0:48	Ohio	Daz'mond Patterson 17-yard touchdown reception from Tyler Tettleton, Josiah Yazdani kick good	7	14
2	9:54	1	80	0:11	Ohio	Donte Foster 80-yard touchdown reception from Derrius Vick, Yazdani kick good	14	14
2	1:01	9	58	3:57	ECU	41-yard field goal by Harvey	14	17
3	6:42	17	60	5:58	Ohio	29-yard field goal by Yazdani	17	17
4	13:33	6	69	2:04	Ohio	28-yard field goal by Yazdani	20	17
4	9:45	5	71	1:23	ECU	Vintavious Cooper 31-yard touchdown run, Harvey kick good	20	24
4	7:29	6	47	1:14	ECU	Carden 14-yard touchdown reception from Worthy, Harvey kick good	20	31
4	1:55	3	39	1:33	ECU	Cooper 22-yard touchdown run, Harvey kick no good (blocked)	20	37
"TOP" = time of possession. For other American football terms, see Glossary of American football.							20	37

=== Statistics ===
==== Team statistics ====
Statistics	Ohio	East Carolina
First downs	21	30
Total offense, plays - yards	81 - 435	87 - 568
Rushes-yards (net)	107	281
Passing yards (net)	328	287
Passes, Comp-Att-Int	24 - 44 - 3	30 - 46 - 0
Time of Possession	26:33	33:27

==== Individual statistics ====
===== Passing =====
Team	Name	Completions	Attempts	Yards	Touchdowns	Interceptions
OHIO	Tyler Tettleton	21	40	228	1	3
OHIO	Derrius Vick	3	3	100	1	0
ECU	Shane Carden	29	45	273	1	0
ECU	Cam Worthy	1	1	14	1	0

===== Rushing =====
Team	Name	Rushes	Yards	Average	Touchdowns	Long
OHIO	Beau Blankenship	21	66	3.1	0	7
OHIO	Daz'mond Patterson	10	28	2.8	0	9
OHIO	Tettleton	4	14	3.5	0	17
ECU	Vintavious Cooper	25	198	7.9	2	39
ECU	Breon Allen	6	43	7.2	1	17
ECU	Carden	10	40	4.0	0	14

===== Receiving =====
Team	Name	Receptions	Yards	Average	Touchdowns	Long
OHIO	Donte Foster	6	160	26.7	1	80
OHIO	Patterson	6	77	12.8	1	26
OHIO	Landon Smith	2	37	18.5	0	23
OHIO	Chase Cochran	5	33	6.6	0	12
OHIO	Troy Mangen	1	6	6.0	0	6
OHIO	Ian Dixon	1	6	6.0	0	6
OHIO	Jordan Reid	2	5	2.5	0	6
OHIO	Troy Hill	1	4	4.0	0	4
ECU	Justin Hardy	9	66	7.3	0	15
ECU	Isaiah Jones	8	48	6.0	0	13
ECU	Worthy	2	42	21.0	1	37
ECU	Bryce Williams	2	27	13.5	0	27
ECU	Breon Allen	1	25	25.0	0	25
ECU	Zico Pasut	2	23	11.5	0	12
ECU	Cooper	3	22	7.3	0	14
ECU	Reese Wiggins	2	20	10.0	0	14
ECU	Carden	1	14	14.0	1	14

- All statistics per ESPN's Box Score of the game.
