= LaVon Brazill =

American football player (born 1989)

No. 15
- Position: Wide receiver

Personal information
- Born: March 15, 1989 (age 37); Lake Worth, Florida, U.S.
- Listed height: 5 ft 11 in (1.80 m)
- Listed weight: 191 lb (87 kg)

Career information
- High school: Lake Worth
- College: Ohio
- NFL draft: 2012: 6th round, 206th overall pick

Career history
- Indianapolis Colts (2012–2013); Toronto Argonauts (2014); Orlando Predators (2016)*
- * Offseason or practice squad member only

Awards and highlights
- Second-team All-American (2009); 2× Second-team All-MAC (2009, 2011)

Career NFL statistics
- Receptions: 23
- Receiving yards: 347
- Receiving touchdowns: 3
- Stats at Pro Football Reference

LaVon Brazill (born March 15, 1989) is an American former professional football player who was a wide receiver for the Indianapolis Colts of the National Football League (NFL). He played college football for the Ohio Bobcats was selected by the Colts in the sixth round of the 2012 NFL draft. He was released after his second suspension for violating the league's substance abuse policy.

== College career ==
Brazill played college football for the Ohio Bobcats from 2007 to 2011 under head coach Frank Solich.

== Professional career ==
=== Indianapolis Colts ===
Brazill was selected in the sixth round with the 206th overall pick in the 2012 NFL draft by the Indianapolis Colts. He caught his first career reception in a Week 1 loss to the Chicago Bears, on a 10-yard pass from fellow rookie Andrew Luck. Brazill caught his first touchdown, a 42-yard reception against the Detroit Lions in a 35–33 win on December 2, 2012. On June 24, 2013, he was suspended for the first four games of the 2013 season for violating the substance policy.

Brazill had his first multi-touchdown game against the Cincinnati Bengals on December 8, 2013. He recorded three catches for 53 yards and two touchdowns. He had his first playoff multi-touchdown game in the AFC Divisional Game on January 11, 2014, against the New England Patriots. On July 3, 2014, Brazill was suspended indefinitely for his second violation of the substance policy. The Colts cut Brazill on July 11, 2014.

=== Toronto Argonauts ===
Brazill signed to the practice squad with the Toronto Argonauts on August 27, 2014. He was promoted to the active roster on August 31, 2014. He was waived on November 4, 2014.

=== Orlando Predators ===
On November 23, 2015, Brazill was assigned to the Orlando Predators of the Arena Football League (AFL). On April 11, 2016, Brazill was placed on recallable reassignment by the team.

== Career statistics ==
=== Professional ===
Season	Team	Games		Receiving					Rushing					Fumbles	
Season	Team	GP	GS	Rec	Yds	Avg	Lng	TD	Att	Yds	Avg	Lng	TD	FUM	Lost
Regular season
2012	Indianapolis Colts	15	0	11	186	16.9	42T	1	–	–	–	–	–	1	1
2013	Indianapolis Colts	10	0	12	161	13.4	29T	2	–	–	–	–	–	1	0
	Total	25	0	23	347	15.1	42T	3	0	0	0.0	0	0	2	1
Postseason
2012	Indianapolis Colts	1	0	1	17	17.0	17	0	–	–	–	–	–	0	0
2013	Indianapolis Colts	2	0	6	127	21.2	38T	2	–	–	–	–	–	0	0
	Total	3	0	7	144	20.5	38T	2	0	0	0.0	0	0	0	0

=== College ===
Season	Team	Receiving						Rushing				
Season	Team	GP	Rec	Yds	Avg	Lng	TD	Att	Yds	Avg	Lng	TD
2007	Ohio	7	16	201	12.6	25	0	–	–	–	–	–
2008	Ohio	12	34	384	11.3	41	1	9	75	8.3	24	0
2009	Ohio	13	53	702	13.2	65	6	14	86	6.1	20	0
2010	Ohio	3	12	78	6.5	13	0	3	5	1.7	6	0
2011	Ohio	14	72	1150	16.0	78	11	5	73	14.6	67	1
	Total	49	187	2515	13.4	78	18	31	239	7.7	67	1
