= Kalvin =

Kalvin may refer to:

People

- Kalvin McRae (born 1985), American football player
- Kalvin Pearson (born 1978), American football player
- Kalvin Phillips (born 1995), English footballer
- Kalvin Robinson (born 1995), American Entrepreneur

Places

- Kálvin tér, Budapest square
