= Tyler Tettleton =

American gridiron football player and coach (born 1990)

Jacksonville Jaguars
- Title: Assistant wide receivers coach

Personal information
- Born: November 21, 1990 (age 35); Norman, Oklahoma, U.S.
- Listed height: 6 ft 0 in (1.83 m)
- Listed weight: 207 lb (94 kg)

Career information
- Position: Quarterback
- High school: Norman North
- College: Ohio
- NFL draft: 2014: undrafted

Career history

Playing
- Hamilton Tiger-Cats (2014)

Coaching
- Oklahoma (2015–2017) Graduate assistant; New York Jets (2018) Pro personnel intern; Cleveland Browns (2019) Offensive quality control coach; LSU (2020) Offensive analyst; Ohio (2021) Pass game coordinator & running backs coach; Jacksonville Jaguars (2022) Assistant running backs coach; Jacksonville Jaguars (2023–present) Assistant wide receivers coach

Tyler Tettleton (born November 21, 1990) is an American football coach and former quarterback who is currently the assistant wide receivers coach for the Jacksonville Jaguars of the National Football League (NFL). He previously served as an offensive quality control coach for the Cleveland Browns. He also coached college football as an offensive analyst at LSU and running backs coach at Ohio. Tettleton played college football at Ohio.

Tettleton was the primary starting quarterback for three seasons at Ohio and is the school's all-time leader in passing yards and passing touchdowns. He played professionally for Hamilton Tiger-Cats of the Canadian Football League (CFL).

== Playing career ==
=== High school ===
Tettleton went to Norman North High School in Norman, Oklahoma. As a senior, he threw for 1,947 yards and 21 touchdowns and rushed for 547 yards and eight touchdowns. He also played two years of basketball at Norman North.

Name	Position	Hometown	High school / college	Height	Weight	40‡	Commit date
Tyler Tettleton	QB	Norman, Oklahoma	Norman North	6 ft 0 in (1.82 m)	200 lb (90 kg)	4.54	January 27, 2009

=== College ===
Tettleton began the 2009 season as the backup to starter Boo Jackson, but played briefly in 10 games, completing nine of 23 passes for 128 yards and two interceptions. 111 of his 128 passing yards came in the home loss to Kent State University

Tettleton was redshirted in 2010.

2011 saw Tettleton take the reins of the offense, leading the Bobcats to their first bowl game victory in team history, the 2011 Famous Idaho Potato Bowl. Down 23–17 with two minutes left in the game, Tettleton led the Bobcats on a 61-yard drive that concluded in a game-winning touchdown. Tettleton set 12 single-season records for the Bobcats in 2011, becoming the first quarterback in school history to throw for more than 3,000 yards.

Notable records set by Tettleton in 2011:

- Highest passer rating: 148.9
- Most completions: 265
- Most touchdown passes: 28
- Most pass yards: 3,306
- Most total yards: 3,960

Tettleton's 2012 season began with 24–14 victory at Penn State Nitany Lions Football, throwing for 324 yards and amounting three total touchdowns. In the Bobcats next game against New Mexico State University, Tettleton helped the Bobcats win with two throwing touchdowns and one rushing. The third game of the 2012 season saw Tettleton lead the team to another come-from-behind victory against the Marshall University, tallying 200 yards passing and three more touchdowns. Tettleton did not play in the 44–9 victory over Norfolk State University due to an undisclosed injury.

==== College statistics ====
Season	Team	Passing										Rushing			
Season	Team	GP	Cmp	Att	%	Yds	Y/A	AV/A	TD	Int	Rate	Att	Yds	Avg	TD
~2009	Ohio	10	9	23	39.1	128	5.6	1.7	0	2	68.5	17	-24	-1.4	1
~2011	Ohio	14	265	413	64.2	3306	8.0	8.3	28	10	148.9	167	666	4.0	10
~2012	Ohio	12	228	367	62.1	2844	7.7	8.2	18	4	141.2	120	244	2.0	4
~2013	Ohio	13	230	371	62.0	2851	7.7	7.4	21	12	138.8	43	24	0.6	0
	Total	49	732	1174	62.4	9129	7.8	7.8	67	28	141.7	347	910	2.8	16

~includes bowl game

Pre-draft measurables
Height	Weight	Arm length	Hand span	Wingspan
5 ft 11 5/8 in (1.82 m)	211 lb (96 kg)	30 1/4 in (0.77 m)	8 3/4 in (0.22 m)	6 ft 3 in (1.91 m)
All values from Pro Day

=== Canadian Football League ===
==== Hamilton Tiger-Cats ====
Tettleton announced that he signed with the Hamilton Tiger-Cats of the Canadian Football League (CFL) on April 4, 2014. He was later released by the Tiger-Cats mid season.

== Coaching career ==
Tettleton began his coaching career as a graduate assistant at Oklahoma and went on to work as a personnel intern with the New York Jets before being hired by the Cleveland Browns as an offensive quality control coach. Tettleton spent 2020 as on offensive analyst with LSU. He returned to his alma mater to become the running backs coach at Ohio replacing Tim Albin who was elevated to head coach prior to the 2021 season.

After one season at his alma mater, Tettleton returned to the National Football League, joining the Jacksonville Jaguars staff as an offensive quality control coach. In 2023 he changed from the assistant running backs coach to the assistant wide receivers coach.

== Personal life ==
Tyler is a son of former Major League Baseball player Mickey Tettleton.
