= Tim Albin =

American football player and coach (born 1965)

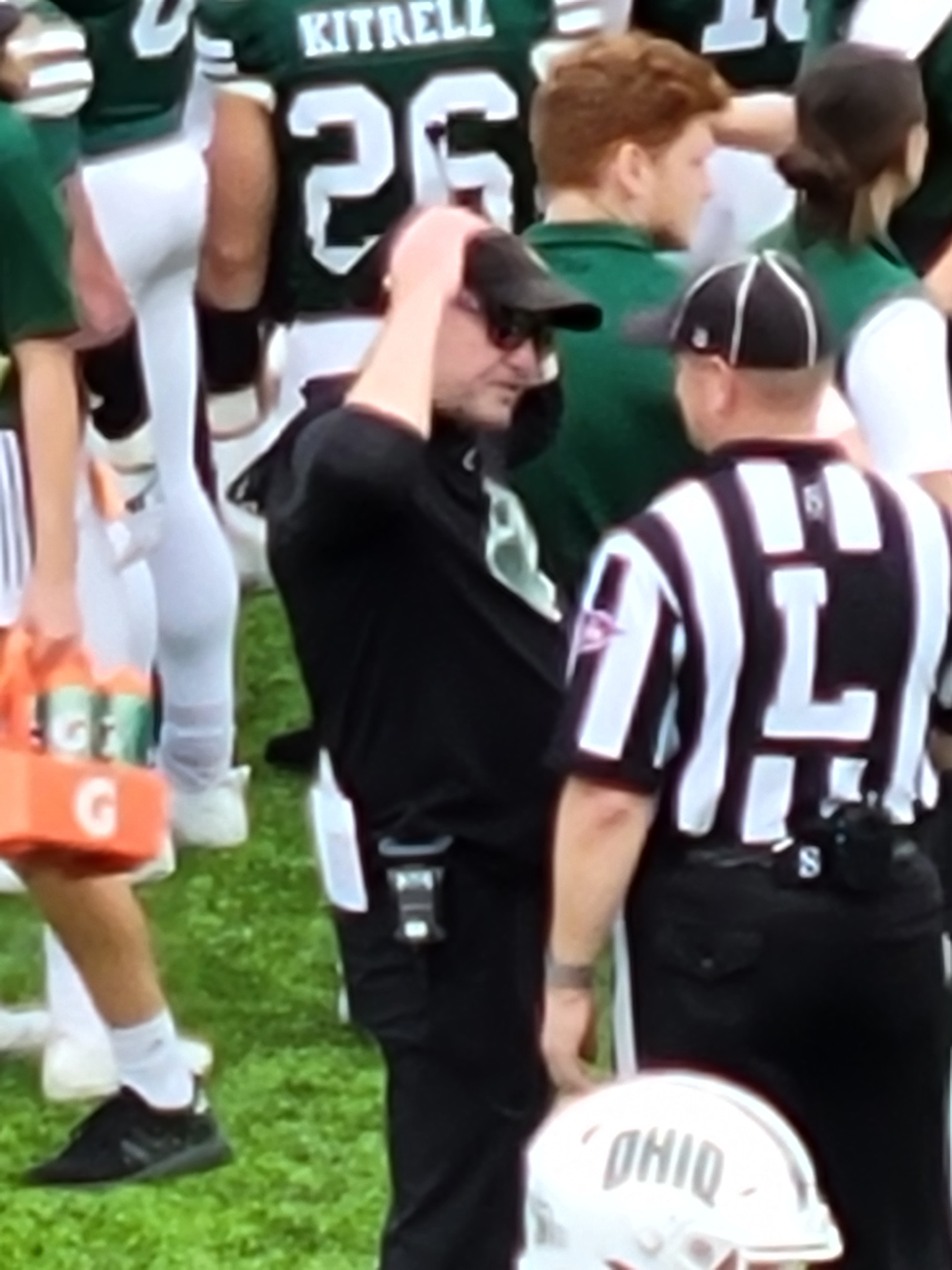
- Albin coaching vs. Fordham in 2022

Current position
- Title: Head coach
- Team: Charlotte
- Conference: American
- Record: 2–21

Biographical details
- Born: September 13, 1965 (age 61); Woodward, Oklahoma, U.S.

Playing career
- 1985–1988: Northwestern Oklahoma State
- Position: Wide receiver

Coaching career (HC unless noted)
- 1989–1991: Northeastern State (OK) (GA/WR)
- 1992–1993: Northeastern State (OK) (OC/OL)
- 1994–1996: Northwestern Oklahoma State (OC/OL)
- 1997–1999: Northwestern Oklahoma State
- 2000–2002: Nebraska (GA)
- 2003: Nebraska (PGC/RB)
- 2004: North Dakota State (OC/RB)
- 2005–2018: Ohio (OC/RB)
- 2019–2020: Ohio (AHC/OC/RB)
- 2021–2024: Ohio
- 2025–present: Charlotte

Head coaching record
- Overall: 60–48
- Bowls: 2–0

Accomplishments and honors

Championships
- 1 NAIA (1999); 1 MAC (2024); 1 MAC East (2022)

Awards
- NAIA Coach of the Year (1999); MAC Coach of the Year (2022, 2024)

Tim Albin (born September 13, 1965) is an American college football coach and former player who is the head football coach at the University of North Carolina at Charlotte. He previously served as the head football coach at Ohio University from 2021 to 2024, where he led them to a MAC championship title in 2024. Albin served as the head football coach at his alma mater, Northwestern Oklahoma State from 1997 through 1999. He led the 1999 Northwestern Oklahoma State Rangers football team to an undefeated 13–0 record, with the season culminating in a NAIA National Championship.

In 2009, he was inducted to the Northwestern Oklahoma State Athletic Hall of Fame for his contributions in the sport of football.

== Playing career ==
Albin played wide receiver for Northwestern Oklahoma State from 1985 through 1988, while completing his degree in business administration. He earned first-team All-Oklahoma Intercollegiate Conference honors, and was also the first player in the school history to be named All-District IX three times. Albin compiled 109 receptions for 1,811 yards in his career.

== Coaching career ==
=== Northeastern State ===
Following his playing career, Albin joined the coaching staff at Northeastern State as a graduate assistant coaching the wide receivers from 1989 to 1991, while also completing his master's of science degree. In 1992, he was promoted to offensive coordinator and offensive line coach. He served in that role for two years.

=== Return to Northwestern Oklahoma State ===
In 1994, Albin returned to his alma mater at Northwestern Oklahoma State serving as the offensive coordinator and offensive line coach for three seasons. In 1997, Albin was promoted to head coach, a position he held for three seasons. Albin's teams improved every year going 5–5 in 1997, 7–3 in 1998, and then 13–0 in 1999. In 1999, Albin's Rangers won the NAIA Football National Championship. Albin was named the NAIA Coach of the Year by Rawlings and American Football Coach Magazine. At Northwestern Oklahoma State, Albin coached longtime NFL WR Patrick Crayton, TE Brandon Christenson, DB Lynn Scott, and 2000 NFL draft pick DT Ron Moore.

=== Nebraska ===
In 2000, Albin joined Frank Solich's staff at Nebraska as an offensive graduate assistant, working with the tight ends for three seasons. He helped coach Tracey Wistrom, who earned third team All-America honors in back-to-back seasons and was selected in the 2002 NFL draft. In 2003, Albin was promoted to running back coach and pass game coordinator. After Solich's dismissal, Albin was not retained. Albin coached NFL players Cory Ross, Tierre Green, and Steve Kriewald.

=== North Dakota State ===
Albin spent the 2004 season as the offensive coordinator and running backs coach at North Dakota State. He helped guide the Bison to an 8–3 season, and No. 25 national ranking in their first season in NCAA Division I-AA (now known as FCS). From the offense, OL Rob Hunt was selected in the 2005 NFL draft.

=== Ohio ===
In 2005, Albin rejoined Solich at Ohio when Solich was named head coach. Albin was the offensive coordinator and running backs coach from his arrival in Athens through the 2020 season. Albin's offenses have been prolific during his time at Ohio. At the running back position, he coached former NFL players Kalvin McRae and Beau Blankenship, as well as current CFL players A. J. Ouellette, Maleek Irons, and Papi White. On the offense that he led, there were several NFL draft picks (WR Taylor Price, WR LaVon Brazill, OL Eric Herman), several undrafted NFL players (WR Phil Bates, TE Jordan Thompson, WR Donte Foster, TE Troy Mangen, and OL Joe Lowery), and CFL draft picks QB Nathan Rourke and RB Maleek Irons.

Albin was named the 2018 FootballScoop Running Backs coach of the year.

While continuing as the offensive coordinator, Albin was promoted to associate head coach on February 28, 2019, following Jim Burrow's retirement.

On July 14, 2021, Albin was promoted to head coach at Ohio following the unexpected retirement of Solich prior to the 2021 season. In his first season the Bobcats finished 3–5 in the MAC to finish in third place in the East Division. They went 0–4 in non-conference games including a loss to FCS Duquesne. This was Ohio's first losing season since 2008. The 2022 season marked a big turnaround from 2021. They finished the regular season on a seven game winning streak with a 9–3 record and 7–1 mark in the MAC. They won the MAC East for the first time since 2016. but lost to Toledo in the MAC Championship Game. Ohio defeated Wyoming in the Arizona Bowl. He led the Bobcats to their 2nd straight 9 win regular season in 2023. Ohio's finished the regular season with the fifth best scoring defense in the FBS at 15.4 points per game, while allowing 96 rushing yards (8th) and 168 passing yards (7th) per game. Ohio accepted a bid to play Georgia Southern in the Myrtle Beach Bowl The Bobcats scored 41 points with the aid of five forced turnovers by the defense to cruise to a 41–21 victory. 2024 saw a third straight nine win season for the Bobcats. At 7–1 in MAC play they qualified to play Miami in the MAC Championship game Ohio defeated Miami 38–3 to win the MAC outright. He brought Ohio their first MAC Championship since 1968 and exited the team bus on the way back to campus to take the head coaching position at Charlotte.

=== Charlotte ===
Charlotte hired Albin as its football coach on December 7, 2024, following the 2024 MAC Championship Game. Albin succeeded Biff Poggi, who was fired after two seasons.

== Personal life ==
Albin and his wife, Brooke, have a daughter, Tori, and a son, Treyce.

== Head coaching record ==
| Year | Team | Overall | Conference | Standing | Bowl/playoffs | NAIA^{#} |
|---|---|---|---|---|---|---|
Northwestern Oklahoma State Rangers (NAIA independent) (1997–1999)
| 1997 | Northwestern Oklahoma State | 5–5 | | | | |
| 1998 | Northwestern Oklahoma State | 7–3 | | | | 21 |
| 1999 | Northwestern Oklahoma State | 13–0 | | | W NAIA Championship | 1 |
| Northwestern Oklahoma State: | | 25–8 | | | | |
Ohio Bobcats (Mid-American Conference) (2021–2024)
| 2021 | Ohio | 3–9 | 3–5 | 3rd (East) | | |
| 2022 | Ohio | 10–4 | 7–1 | 1st (East) | W Arizona | |
| 2023 | Ohio | 10–3 | 6–2 | 2nd (East) | W Myrtle Beach | |
| 2024 | Ohio | 10–3 | 7–1 | T–1st | Cure (Note: Albin resigned before the bowl game) | |
| Ohio: | | 33–19 | 23–9 | | | |
Charlotte 49ers (American Conference) (2025–present)
| 2025 | Charlotte | 1–11 | 0–8 | 14th | | |
| 2026 | Charlotte | 1–10 | 1–6 | | | |
| Charlotte: | | 2–21 | 1–14 | | | |
| Total: | | 60–48 | | | | |
National championship Conference title Conference division title or championship game berth
^{#}Rankings from final NAIA poll.
