= Kentrell Brothers =

American gridiron football player (born 1993)

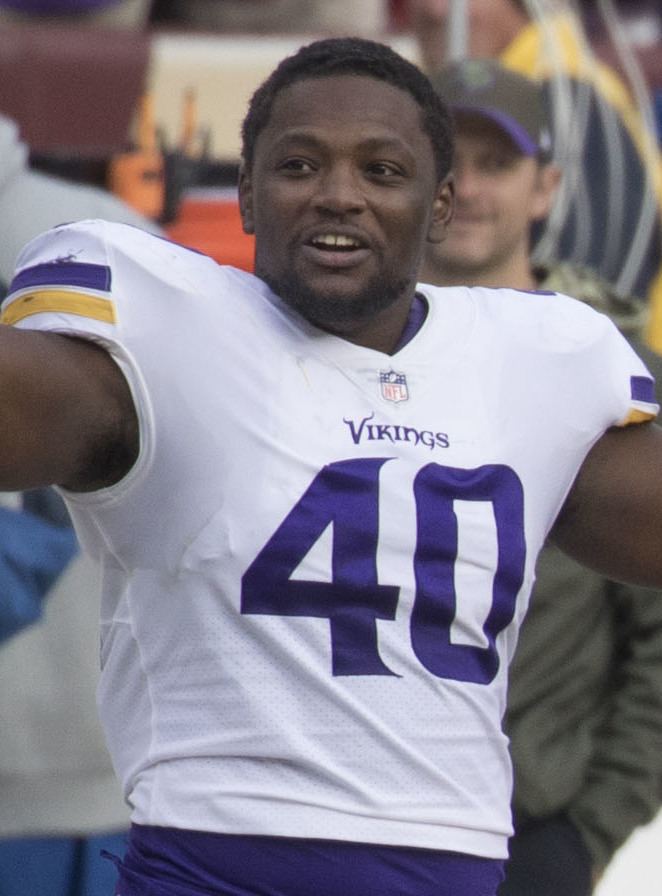
- Brothers with the Minnesota Vikings in 2017

No. 40
- Position: Linebacker

Personal information
- Born: February 8, 1993 (age 33); Guthrie, Oklahoma, U.S.
- Listed height: 6 ft 1 in (1.85 m)
- Listed weight: 242 lb (110 kg)

Career information
- High school: Guthrie
- College: Missouri
- NFL draft: 2016: 5th round, 160th overall pick

Career history
- Minnesota Vikings (2016–2019); Montreal Alouettes (2021)*
- * Offseason or practice squad member only

Awards and highlights
- Second-team All-American (2015); First-team All-SEC (2015); Second-team All-SEC (2014)

Career NFL statistics
- Total tackles: 55
- Sacks: 1.0
- Stats at Pro Football Reference

Kentrell Brothers (born February 8, 1993) is an American former professional football player who was a linebacker in the National Football League (NFL). He played college football for the Missouri Tigers and was selected by the Minnesota Vikings in the fifth round of the 2016 NFL draft.

== Early life ==
Kentrell attended Guthrie High School in Guthrie, Oklahoma, where he was a two-way star for the Bluejays football team at defensive end and wide receiver. During a playoff game in his junior year, Brothers roasted an Oklahoma-committed offensive lineman in a game against Duncan for four sacks. As a senior, he turned around and recorded five sacks on the same commit against Duncan in week 1, and also managed to score three touchdowns in that game. Following his junior season at Guthrie, Missouri became the first school to offer him a scholarship offer. Over the course of his senior year in which he posted over 100 tackles and 19 sacks as a defensive end and caught 63 balls for 1,304 yards and 18 touchdowns at wide receiver, the number of scholarships ballooned to 14 offers from all across the country. In addition to football, Brothers also participated in basketball and tennis at Guthrie.

Brothers was regarded as a three-star recruit by Rivals.com and committed to the University of Missouri to play college football on November 11, 2010.

== College career ==
After redshirting his first year at Missouri in 2011 due to an injury, Brothers played in 11 games as a redshirt freshman in 2012 and recorded 14 tackles. As a sophomore in 2013, Brothers became a starter and started all 14 games. He finished the year with 70 tackles, three interceptions, and one sack. As a junior in 2014, he had a team-leading 122 tackles.

== Professional career ==
=== Pre-draft ===
External videos
- Brothers' NFL Combine workout
- Brothers gets drafted by Minnesota

Pre-draft measurables
Height	Weight	Arm length	Hand span	40-yard dash	10-yard split	20-yard split	20-yard shuttle	Three-cone drill	Vertical jump	Broad jump	Bench press
6 ft 0 in (1.83 m)	245 lb (111 kg)	30 3/4	9 3/4	4.73 s	1.68 s	2.84 s	4.11 s	6.99 s	31 1/2	9 ft 2 in (2.79 m)	19 reps
All values from NFL Combine except 40 time, vertical and bench press from Missouri Pro Day

At the NFL Combine, Brothers ran the 40-yard dash in 4.89 seconds, which ranked 27th among 31 linebackers, but his 4.73-second sprint at Missouri Pro Day would have tied him for the fifth-fastest among inside linebacker prospects. In addition, he also improved his vertical jump 3 inches to 31 1/2 inches and matched his bench press with a personal-record 19 repetitions.

=== Minnesota Vikings ===
Brothers was selected by the Minnesota Vikings in the fifth round, 160th overall, in the 2016 NFL draft.

Brothers didn't play any defensive snaps as a rookie, but he contributed to the team as a special teamer, finishing third on the Vikings with nine special teams tackles. He was the only player to make two units on the All-Pro Football Focus Special Teams teams.

On April 20, 2018, Brothers was suspended the first four games for violating the NFL's performance-enhancing drugs policy. After becoming a free agent following the 2019 NFL season, Brothers was suspended for the first nine weeks of the 2020 NFL season on July 17, 2020. He was reinstated from suspension on November 10, 2020.

=== Montreal Alouettes ===
Brothers signed with the Montreal Alouettes of the Canadian Football League on February 17, 2021.

== Career statistics ==
=== NFL ===
Year	Team	Games		Tackles				Interceptions						Fumbles		
Year	Team	GP	GS	Cmb	Solo	Ast	Sck	PD	Int	Yds	Avg	Lng	TD	FF	FR	Yds
2016	MIN	10	0	9	9	0	0.0	0	0	0	0.0	0	0	0	0	0
2017	MIN	16	0	13	9	4	0.0	0	0	0	0.0	0	0	0	0	0
2018	MIN	12	0	10	7	3	1.0	0	0	0	0.0	0	0	0	0	0
2019	MIN	13	1	23	16	7	0.0	0	0	0	0.0	0	0	0	0	0
Career		51	1	55	41	14	1.0	0	0	0	0.0	0	0	0	0	0

=== College ===
Season	Team	Games		Tackles					Interceptions						Fumbles		
Season	Team	GP	GS	Cmb	Solo	Ast	Sck	TfL	PD	Int	Yds	Avg	Lng	TD	FF	FR	Yds
2012	Missouri	11	0	14	7	7	0.0	0.0	0	0	0	0.0	0	0	0	0	0
2013	Missouri	14	14	70	40	30	1.0	6.5	3	3	30	10.0	0	0	0	0	0
2014	Missouri	14	14	121	64	57	1.0	5.0	4	0	0	0.0	0	0	3	0	0
2015	Missouri	12	12	152	73	79	2.5	12.0	3	2	9	4.5	0	0	1	0	0
Totals		51	40	357	184	173	4.5	23.5	11	5	39	7.8	0	0	4	0	0

== See also ==
- List of NCAA major college football yearly tackles leaders
