= Guthrie High School (Oklahoma) =

High school in Guthrie, Oklahoma, U.S.

Location
- 200 Crooks Drive; Guthrie, Oklahoma 73044; United States; 35°53′36″N 97°25′17″W

Information
- School type: Public, High School
- Established: 1968
- Teaching staff: 57.32 (FTE)
- Grades: 9-12
- Enrollment: 1,018 (2023-2024)
- Student to teacher ratio: 17.76
- Colors: Blue and white
- Team name: Bluejays
- Website: www.guthrieps.net/vnews/display.v/SEC/High%20School

Guthrie High School is a public secondary school in Guthrie, Oklahoma, United States. It is located at 200 Crooks Drive in Guthrie, Oklahoma and the only high school in Guthrie Public Schools.

== History ==
The school's history dates back to the late 19th century, while the current building opened in 1968, with two additional wings added on later.

== Athletics ==
Guthrie High School competes in Class 5A of the OSSAA. The mascot is the Bluejay. The Bluejays play at Jelsma Stadium which built during the 1930s at the site of an old train terminus, the stadium with its wall on the north side causes horseshoe-like wind conditions and it is known for being one of the most unusual places to play in Oklahoma as well as in the nation. GHS won class 5A state championships in football in 2002, 2007, 2011 and 2013; basketball in 1954, 1956, 1968, 1969, 2008, and 2009. There are three championships for the Lady Jays in 1923, 1924, 1990. The Bluejays have won six championships in cross country in 1983, 1984, 1994, 1991, 2009, and in 2010 and a Lady Jays championship in 2003. The Bluejays also won a state championship in boys' track and field in 2009, a first for the track and field program in Guthrie. Another came again the following year. They have one in 1989 for baseball. The golf program has two: 1992 and 1998 and three for the girls: 1939, 1940, 1979; wrestling in 1981.

== Notable alumni ==
- Gene Stephenson, former Wichita State University baseball coach
- Phil Stephenson, former MLB player for the Oakland Athletics, Chicago Cubs, and San Diego Padres
- Donte Foster, former NFL player for the San Diego Chargers
- Kentrell Brothers, current NFL player for the Minnesota Vikings
