= Taylor Price =

American football player (born 1987)

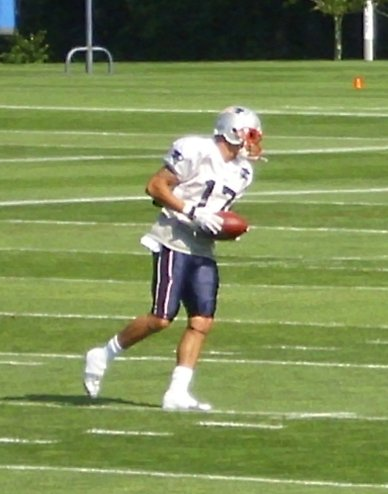
- Price with the New England Patriots in 2010

No. 17, 15
- Position: Wide receiver

Personal information
- Born: October 8, 1987 (age 39); Hilliard, Ohio, U.S.
- Listed height: 6 ft 0 in (1.83 m)
- Listed weight: 204 lb (93 kg)

Career information
- High school: Hilliard Darby
- College: Ohio
- NFL draft: 2010: 3rd round, 90th overall pick

Career history
- New England Patriots (2010−2011); Jacksonville Jaguars (2011–2013); Seattle Seahawks (2014)*
- * Offseason or practice squad member only

Awards and highlights
- Second-team All-MAC (2009)

Career NFL statistics
- Receptions: 5
- Receiving yards: 80
- Stats at Pro Football Reference

Taylor Price (born October 8, 1987) is an American former professional football player who was a wide receiver in the National Football League (NFL). He played college football for the Ohio Bobcats and was selected by the New England Patriots in the third round of the 2010 NFL draft. He was also a member of the Jacksonville Jaguars and Seattle Seahawks.

== Early life ==
Price was born in Hilliard, Ohio, and attended Hilliard Darby High School. As a junior, he was a second-team all-conference selection and as a senior he was an honorable mention all-district selection. He played in all three phases of the game, and blocked five kicks on special teams as a junior. He also lettered in baseball.

== College career ==
Price attended Ohio University and played in 14 games as a true freshman in 2006, finishing the year with nine receptions for 77 yards. As a sophomore, Price started at wide receiver and recorded 33 receptions for 464 yards and four touchdowns. He also had six rushes for 23 yards and two passes for 50 yards and a touchdown. In 2008 as a junior, Price started 11 of 12 games made 51 catches for 694 yards and five touchdowns. He also rushed five times for 19 yards and had two kickoff returns for 22 yards. In his senior season in 2009, Price started all 14 games and set a career-high with 56 receptions for 784 yards, and also carried the ball 11 times for 103 yards. His 149 career receptions set an Ohio record, while his 2,019 receiving yards ranked second in school history. Price also had a 14-catch performance against Wyoming, a school record.

=== Statistics ===
Season	Team	Receiving						Rushing				
Season	Team	GP	Rec	Yds	Avg	Lng	TD	Att	Yds	Avg	Lng	TD
~2006	Ohio University	14	9	77	8.6	27	0	2	-20	–10.0	0	0
2007	Ohio University	12	33	464	14.1	54	4	6	23	3.8	17	0
2008	Ohio University	12	51	694	13.6	51	5	5	19	3.8	20	0
~2009	Ohio University	14	56	784	14.0	50	5	11	103	9.4	25	0
	Total	52	149	2,019	13.6	54	14	24	125	5.2	25	0

~includes bowl games

== Professional career ==
Pre-draft measurables
Height	Weight	Arm length	Hand span	40-yard dash	10-yard split	20-yard split	20-yard shuttle	Three-cone drill	Vertical jump	Broad jump	Bench press
6 ft 0 3/8 in (1.84 m)	204 lb (93 kg)	31 1/4 in (0.79 m)	9 1/2 in (0.24 m)	4.41 s	1.52 s	2.56 s	4.34 s	6.82 s	37 in (0.94 m)	9 ft 6 in (2.90 m)	16 reps
All values from NFL Scouting Combine.

=== New England Patriots ===
Price was selected by the New England Patriots in the third round (90th overall) of the 2010 NFL draft. On May 25, 2010, he signed a four-year deal with the Patriots. Price was inactive for the first 15 games of his rookie regular season before making his NFL debut in the Week 17 finale against the Miami Dolphins. He caught three passes for 41 yards in the game. Price was waived by the Patriots on December 3, 2011, after playing in only three games in 2011.

=== Jacksonville Jaguars ===
The Jacksonville Jaguars claimed Price off waivers on December 5, 2011. The Tampa Bay Buccaneers had also put in a claim for Price, but he went to the Jaguars because they were higher on the waiver order.

Price was waived/injured on August 12, 2012, and subsequently reverted to injured reserve on August 18.

Price was once again waived/injured on August 5, 2013 and placed on injured reserve on August 7.

=== Seattle Seahawks ===
Seattle signed Price to a one-year contract on March 12, 2014. He was placed on injured reserve on July 29, 2014.
