= Beau Blankenship =

American football player (born 1990)

Profile
- Position: Running back

Personal information
- Born: August 13, 1990 (age 36); Norman, Oklahoma, U.S.
- Listed height: 5 ft 9 in (1.75 m)
- Listed weight: 202 lb (92 kg)

Career information
- High school: Norman North (OK) Norman
- College: Ohio
- NFL draft: 2014: undrafted

Career history
- Jacksonville Jaguars (2014)*
- * Offseason or practice squad member only

Awards and highlights
- Independence Bowl Co-Offensive MVP (2012); Second-team All-MAC (2012)

Beau Blankenship (born August 13, 1990) is an American former football running back. He was signed by the Jacksonville Jaguars as an undrafted free agent in 2014. He played college football at Iowa State in 2009 and Ohio from 2011 to 2013.

== Early life ==
Blankenship played football for Norman North High School, where he gained 5,050 rushing yards and 59 total touchdowns. He was an all-state selection. Blankenship was also on the track and field team.

== College career ==
In 2009, Blankenship played seven games for Iowa State. He gained 11 total yards. He then redshirted in 2010. In 2011, he played 13 games for Ohio and had 462 rushing yards and four touchdowns. He had a season-high 129 yards against Central Michigan on November 10. He rushed for 47 yards in the 2011 Famous Idaho Potato Bowl.

In 2012, Blankenship rushed for 1,604 yards and 15 touchdowns, breaking Kalvin McRae's Ohio record for rushing yards in a season. On September 29, against Massachusetts, Blankenship had 43 carries, which tied a school record; his 269 yards in that game was a season high for him. In the 2012 Independence Bowl, he totaled 104 rushing yards, and his four touchdowns set an Independence Bowl record. It was Blankenship's ninth 100-yard rushing game in 2012, which was another school record. He was also named the game's co-offensive most valuable player. Blankenship was named to the 2012 All-MAC second-team. His 312 rushing attempts led the MAC, and his 1,604 rushing yards ranked second.

=== Statistics ===
Season	Team	Rushing						Receiving				
Season	Team	GP	Att	Yds	Avg	Lng	TD	Rec	Yds	Avg	Lng	TD
~2009	Iowa State	7	4	11	2.8	5	0	0	0	0.0	0	0
~2011	Ohio University	13	93	462	5.0	48	4	3	19	6.3	11	0
~2012	Ohio University	13	312	1604	5.1	58	15	21	182	8.7	28	1
~2013	Ohio University	13	204	910	4.5	53	5	15	62	4.1	10	0
	Total	46	613	2987	4.9	58	24	39	263	6.7	28	1

~includes bowl game

== Professional career ==
Beau used his pro day to showcase his skills. He ran the 40 yard dash in 4.4 seconds, his vertical jump was 37.5 inches and he bench pressed 225 lbs 27 times. source

Following an invitation to rookie minicamp, the Jacksonville Jaguars signed Blankenship on May 17, 2014. He was released on July 23.

Beau currently owns a Real estate brokerage (Engel & Völkers 30-A beaches) on scenic highway 30-A. and a property management company owner in Santa Rosa Beach, FL. Source

== Personal life ==
Blankenship is a communication studies major. He was born to Cynthia and Charlie on August 13, 1990, and has one sister, Brittany.
