= 2020 Famous Idaho Potato Bowl (January) =

Postseason college football bowl game

- 23rd Famous Idaho Potato Bowl
Ohio Bobcats	Nevada Wolf Pack
(6–6)	(7–5)
MAC	Mountain West
30	21
Head coach: Frank Solich	Head coach: Jay Norvell
	1	2	3	4	Total
Ohio	3	17	10	0	30
Nevada	3	6	0	12	21
- Date: January 3, 2020
- Season: 2019
- Stadium: Albertsons Stadium
- Location: Boise, Idaho
- MVP: Nathan Rourke (QB, Ohio)
- Favorite: Ohio by 10
- Referee: Billy Williams (C-USA)
- Attendance: 13,611
- Payout: US$800,000

United States TV coverage
- Network: ESPN
- Announcers: Bill Roth (play–by–play); John Congemi (analyst); Kris Budden (sideline)

International TV coverage
- Network: ESPN Brasil
- Announcers: Matheus Pinheiro (play-by-play); Weinny Eirado (analyst)

The 2020 Famous Idaho Potato Bowl was a college football bowl game played on January 3, 2020, with kickoff at 3:30 p.m. EST (1:30 p.m. local MST) on ESPN. It was the 23rd edition of the Famous Idaho Potato Bowl, and one of the 2019–20 bowl games concluding the 2019 FBS football season. The game was sponsored by the Idaho Potato Commission, from which it gets its name.

== Teams ==
The game matched the Ohio Bobcats from the Mid-American Conference (MAC) and the Nevada Wolf Pack from the Mountain West Conference. This was the first meeting between the two programs.

=== Ohio Bobcats ===
Ohio entered the game with a 6–6 record (5–3 in conference). They finished in a three-way tie for second place in the MAC's East Division, and did not face any ranked FBS teams during the season. After starting the season 2–4, the Bobcats won four of their remaining six games to become bowl eligible. This was Ohio's second appearance in this bowl; their 2011 team won that season's Famous Idaho Potato Bowl over Utah State, 24–23.

=== Nevada Wolf Pack ===
Nevada entered the game with a 7–5 record (4–4 in conference). They finished in third place in Mountain West's West Division. The Wolf Pack were 1–1 against ranked FBS teams, defeating San Diego State while losing to Oregon. This was Nevada's third Famous Idaho Potato Bowl; the Wolf Pack were seeking their first victory in the bowl after losses in the 2006 MPC Computers Bowl (to Miami (FL)) and the 2008 Humanitarian Bowl (to Maryland), when the bowl operated under different names.

== Game summary ==
2020 Famous Idaho Potato Bowl

Quarter	1	2	3	4	Total
Ohio	3	17	10	0	30
Nevada	3	6	0	12	21

at Albertsons Stadium • Boise, Idaho

- Date: Friday, January 3, 2020
- Game time: 3:30 p.m. EST (1:30 p.m. MST)
- Game weather: Partly cloudy • Temperature: 47 °F (8 °C) • Wind: NNE 1 mph
- Game attendance: 13,611
- Referee: Billy Williams
- TV announcers (ESPN): Bill Roth (play-by-play), John Congemi (analyst) and Kris Budden (sideline)
- ESPN game summary

Game information

First Quarter

- (12:26) NEV – Brandon Talton 51 yard field goal (Drive: 6 plays, 46 yards, 2:34; Nevada 3–0)
- (7:00) OHIO – Louie Zervos 29 yard field goal (Drive: 10 plays, 65 yards, 5:26; Tied 3–3)

Second Quarter

- (12:28) OHIO – Julian Ross 12 yard rush, Louie Zervos kick (Drive: 15 plays, 71 yards, 7:47; Ohio 10–3)
- (7:21) NEV – Brandon Talton 38 yard field goal (Drive: 10 plays, 59 yards, 5:07; Ohio 10–6)
- (6:21) OHIO – Nathan Rourke 35 yard rush, Louie Zervos kick (Drive: 3 plays, 77 yards, 1:00; Ohio 17–6)
- (2:17) OHIO – Louie Zervos 33 yard field goal (Drive: 5 plays, 20 yards, 2:02; Ohio 20–6)
- (0:00) NEV – Brandon Talton 33 yard field goal (Drive: 12 plays, 67 yards, 2:17; Ohio 20–9)

Third Quarter

- (11:00) OHIO – Louie Zervos 26 yard field goal (Drive: 9 plays, 66 yards, 4:00; Ohio 23–9)
- (5:26) OHIO – De'Montre Tuggle 2 yard run, Louie Zervos kick (Drive: 5 plays, 50 yards, 2:26; Ohio 30–9)

Fourth Quarter

- (10:48) NEV – Carson Strong 8 yard pass to Elijah Cooks, Brandon Talton kick blocked (Drive: 10 plays, 78 yards, 3:33; Ohio 30–15)
- (8:42) NEV – Devonte Lee 1 yard run, conversion pass failed (Drive: 3 plays, 21 yards, 0:57; Ohio 30–21)

=== Statistics ===
Statistics	OHIO	NEV
First downs	25	24
Plays–yards	77–429	69–430
Rushes–yards	60–285	19–29
Passing yards	144	401
Passing: comp–att–int	9–17–0	32–50–0
Time of possession	33:13	26:47

Team	Category	Player	Statistics
Ohio	Passing	Nathan Rourke	9/17, 144 yards
Ohio	Rushing	De'Montre Tuggle	10 carries, 97 yards, 1 TD
Ohio	Receiving	Isiah Cox	3 receptions, 73 yards
Nevada	Passing	Carson Strong	31/49, 402 yards, 1 TD
Nevada	Rushing	Toa Taua	6 carries, 48 yards
Nevada	Receiving	Elijah Cooks	14 receptions, 197 yards, 1 TD
