= 2012 Independence Bowl =

2012 AdvoCare V100 Independence Bowl
- 37th Independence Bowl
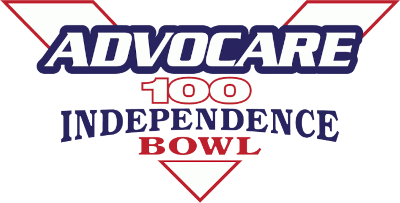
- 2012 AdvoCare V100 Independence Bowl Logo
Ohio Bobcats	Louisiana–Monroe Warhawks
(8–4)	(8–4)
MAC	Sun Belt
45	14
Head coach: Frank Solich	Head coach: Todd Berry
	1	2	3	4	Total
Ohio	14	10	14	7	45
Louisiana–Monroe	0	7	7	0	14
- Date: December 28, 2012
- Season: 2012
- Stadium: Independence Stadium
- Location: Shreveport, Louisiana
- MVP: Keith Moore-LB Beau Blankenship-RB Tyler Tettleton-QB
- Favorite: La. Monroe by 7
- National anthem: Sound of Today
- Referee: Dennis Hennigan (Big East)
- Halftime show: Sound of Today and The Ohio University Marching 110
- Attendance: 41,853
- Payout: US$1,100,000

United States TV coverage
- Network: ESPN
- Announcers: Dave LaMont Kelly Stouffer Cara Capuano

The 2012 AdvoCare V100 Independence Bowl was a post-season American college football bowl game held on December 28, 2012, at Independence Stadium in Shreveport, Louisiana, in the United States. The 37th edition of the Independence Bowl began at 1:00 p.m. CST and aired on ESPN. The game's title sponsor was AdvoCare, an American dietary supplement company.

The game featured the Ohio Bobcats from the Mid-American Conference against the Louisiana–Monroe Warhawks from the Sun Belt Conference and was the final game of the 2012 NCAA Division I FBS football season for both teams. Both the Bobcats and the Warhawks accepted their invitation after finishing at 8–4 during the regular season. This was both teams' first appearance in the Independence Bowl.

== Teams ==
Under normal circumstances, the Independence Bowl would feature the seventh bowl-eligible team from the Atlantic Coast Conference against the tenth bowl-eligible team from the Southeastern Conference. However, both conferences are one school shy of having enough bowl-eligible teams to qualify (the ACC has six and the SEC has nine).

On Friday, November 30, Louisiana Tech was invited to play in the Independence Bowl but asked for more time as they were in negotiations with the Liberty Bowl and Heart of Dallas Bowl. Louisiana Tech athletic director Bruce Van De Velde and WAC commissioner Jeff Hurd both claimed that on Saturday, December 1, the Liberty Bowl executive director Steve Ehrhart guaranteed the Bulldogs a bowl invite. After the Independence Bowl's deadline for Louisiana Tech to accept their invitation passed, the Independence Bowl selected the MAC's Ohio (8-4) instead. On Sunday, December 2, the Liberty Bowl extended their remaining bid to Iowa State (6-6) instead of Louisiana Tech (9-3). The Bulldogs did not end up playing in any bowl game despite boasting the nation's top scoring offense.

This was the first meeting between these two teams.

=== Ohio ===
Despite a promising 7–0 start to the season (including a #23 ranking as well as defeating Penn State), the Bobcats would decline during their last five games, posting a mere 1–4 record during that timespan, dropping their conference record to 4-4, only good for third place in the MAC East Division. When Louisiana Tech declined their invitation, the Bobcats accepted theirs.

=== Louisiana–Monroe ===
In their first winning season since joining Division I FBS (then Division I-A) in 1994 (when they were the Northeast Louisiana Indians), the Warhawks finished in a tie for second place in the Sun Belt, amassing a 6–2 conference and 8–4 overall record. After the season, the Warhawks accepted an invitation to the 2012 Independence Bowl.

This was the first bowl game in school history for the Warhawks, being one of two teams making their bowl debut this season (along with fellow Sun Belt member the Western Kentucky Hilltoppers).

== Game summary ==
=== Scoring summary ===
Scoring summary

Quarter	Time	Drive			Team	Scoring information	Score	
Quarter	Time	Plays	Yards	TOP	Team	Scoring information	Ohio	Louisiana-Monroe
1	12:03	3	80	1:10	OHIO	Donte Foster 3-yard touchdown reception from Tyler Tettleton, Matt Weller kick good	7	0
1	8:17	4	87	1:40	OHIO	Chase Cochran 68-yard touchdown reception from Tyler Tettleton, Matt Weller kick good	14	0
2	14:37	5	53	0:55	LA-M	Tavarese Maye 14-yard touchdown reception from Kolton Browning, Justin Manton kick good	14	7
2	11:08	8	54	3:29	OHIO	38-yard field goal by Matt Weller	17	7
2	4:50	3	3	1:12	OHIO	Beau Blankenship 2-yard touchdown run, Matt Weller kick good	24	7
3	12:22	7	75	2:38	OHIO	Beau Blankenship 2-yard touchdown run, Matt Weller kick good	31	7
3	8:25	6	70	2:54	OHIO	Beau Blankenship 1-yard touchdown run, Matt Weller kick good	38	7
3	2:40	12	66	5:45	LA-M	Kevin Steed 1-yard touchdown reception from Kolton Browning, Justin Manton kick good	38	14
4	14:52	8	75	2:48	OHIO	Beau Blankenship 2-yard touchdown run, Matt Weller kick good	45	14
"TOP" = time of possession. For other American football terms, see Glossary of American football.							45	14

=== Starting lineups ===
Louisiana–Monroe	Position	Ohio
Offense
Je'Ron Hamm	WR	Tyler Futrell
Joseph Treadwell	LT	Skyler Allen
Jon Fisher	LG	Jon Lechner
Josh Allen	C	Eric Herman
Jonathon Gill	RG	John Prior
Demiere Burkett	RT	Bryce Dietz
Keavon Milton	TE	Troy Hill
Brent Leonard	WR	Donte Foster
Kolton Browning	QB	Tyler Tettleton
Monterrell Washington	RB	Beau Blankenship
Tavarese Maye	WR–TE	Tyler Knight
Defense
Malcolm Edmond	LE	Corey Hasting
Gerrand Johnson	DT–LDT	Neal Huynh
Joey Gautney	RE–RDT	Carl Jones
DaCorris Ford	OLB–RE	Tremayne Scott
R.J. Young	MLB–SLB	Jelani Woseley
Ray Stovall	OLB–MLB	Nate Carpenter
Henry Mitchell	CB–WLB	Keith Moore
Rob'Donovan Lewis	LCB	Larenzo Fisher
Otis Peterson	RCB	Ian Wells
Cordero Smith	SS	Josh Kristoff
Isaiah Newsome	FS	Gerald Moore
