= 2017 Bahamas Bowl =

- 4th Bahamas Bowl
UAB Blazers	Ohio Bobcats
(8–4)	(8–4)
C-USA	MAC
6	41
Head coach: Bill Clark	Head coach: Frank Solich
	1	2	3	4	Total
UAB	0	3	3	0	6
Ohio	13	14	14	0	41
- Date: December 22, 2017
- Season: 2017
- Stadium: Thomas Robinson Stadium
- Location: Nassau, Bahamas
- MVP: Dorian Brown (RB, Ohio) & Javon Hagan (FS, Ohio)
- Referee: Charles Lamertina (American)
- Attendance: 13,585
- Payout: US$200,000

United States TV coverage
- Network: ESPN; RedVoice, LLC
- Announcers: Steve Levy, Desmond Howard, Laura Rutledge

The 2017 Bahamas Bowl was a college football bowl game played on December 22, 2017, at Thomas Robinson Stadium in Nassau in the Bahamas. The fourth annual Bahamas Bowl, it was one of the 2017–18 bowl games concluding the 2017 FBS football season. It began at 12:30 p.m. EST and aired on ESPN.

The game featured the Ohio Bobcats of the Mid-American Conference against the UAB Blazers of Conference USA. Ohio beat UAB by a score of 41–6.

== Teams ==
The game featured the UAB Blazers against the Ohio Bobcats and was the first-ever meeting between the two schools.

=== UAB Blazers ===
2017 was the Blazers' first season back on the football field following a two-year hiatus (the program had originally been dropped, but massive public outcry led to its reinstatement a year later). After finishing their regular season 8–4, the Blazers accepted their invitation to the Bahamas Bowl.

This was the first bowl game for UAB since the 2004 Hawaii Bowl where they lost to the Hawaii Warriors by a score of 59–40.

=== Ohio Bobcats ===
After finishing their regular season 8–4, the Bobcats accepted their invitation to the Bahamas Bowl.

This was Ohio's eighth bowl appearance in the last nine seasons, and their first appearance in the Bahamas Bowl.

== Game summary ==
=== Scoring Summary ===
Scoring summary

Quarter	Time	Drive			Team	Scoring information	Score	
Quarter	Time	Plays	Yards	TOP	Team	Scoring information	UAB	OHIO
1	8:41	11	75	6:19	OHIO	DL Knock 2-yard touchdown reception from Nathan Rourke, Louie Zervos kick good	0	7
1	1:20	3	70	1:20	OHIO	Papi White 56-yard touchdown reception from Nathan Rourke, Louie Zervos kick no good	0	13
2	12:26	1	74	0:15	OHIO	Dorian Brown 74-yard touchdown run, Louie Zervos kick good	0	20
2	7:28	6	55	1:42	UAB	34-yard field goal by Nick Vogel	3	20
2	1:16	9	63	6:12	OHIO	Dorian Brown 9-yard touchdown run, Louie Zervos kick good	3	27
3	10:46	11	83	4:14	UAB	25-yard field goal by Nick Vogel	6	27
3	7:45	1	25	0:09	OHIO	Dorian Brown 25-yard touchdown run, Louie Zervos kick good	6	34
3	4:05	6	68	3:08	OHIO	Dorian Brown 14-yard touchdown run, Louie Zervos kick good	6	41
"TOP" = time of possession. For other American football terms, see Glossary of American football.							6	41

=== Statistics ===
	1	2	3	4	Total
Blazers	0	3	3	0	6
Bobcats	13	14	14	0	41

Statistics	UAB	Ohio
First downs	20	24
Total offense, yards	353	459
Rushes-yards (net)	25–99	32–249
Passing yards (net)	254	210
Passes, Comp-Att-Int	24–45–0	14–22–0
Time of Possession	29:34	30:26

Team	Category	Player	Statistics
UAB	Passing	A.J. Erdely	24/45, 254 yds
UAB	Rushing	Spencer Brown	13 car, 37 yds
UAB	Receiving	Ronnie Turner Jr.	4 rec, 67 yds
Ohio	Passing	Nathan Rourke	12/18, 185 yds, 2 TD
Ohio	Rushing	Dorian Brown	12 car, 152 yds, 4 TD
Ohio	Receiving	Papi White	4 rec, 106 yds, 1 TD
