= 2009 Little Caesars Pizza Bowl =

Annual NCAA football game

Marshall Thundering Herd	Ohio Bobcats
(6–6)	(9–4)
C-USA	MAC
21	17
Head coach: Rick Minter (interim)	Head coach: Frank Solich
	1	2	3	4	Total
Marshall	14	7	0	0	21
Ohio	0	7	10	0	17
- Date: December 26, 2009
- Season: 2009
- Stadium: Ford Field
- Location: Detroit, Michigan
- MVP: RB Martin Ward (Marshall)
- Favorite: Ohio by 3
- Referee: Robert Cameron (WAC)
- Attendance: 30,331
- Payout: US$750,000

United States TV coverage
- Network: ESPN
- Announcers: Pam Ward; Ray Bentley
- Nielsen ratings: 2.6

The 2009 Little Caesars Pizza Bowl was an NCAA-sanctioned bowl game (previously the Motor City Bowl game) played at 1:00 p.m. EST on December 26, 2009, at Ford Field in Detroit, Michigan and aired on ESPN.

The game was the 13th installment of the bowl game played in Detroit. The Marshall Thundering Herd of Conference USA defeated the Ohio Bobcats, champion of the East Division of the Mid-American Conference, 21–17, giving the Thundering Herd a seven-win season. A lack of eligible teams from the Big Ten Conference made a spot available in the game for Marshall.

Line judge Sarah Thomas became the first woman to officiate a college football bowl game.

== Teams ==
The 2009 game marked an unexpected renewal of the Battle for the Bell, the rivalry between the two nearby teams (about 80 miles (130 km) apart), which had been on hiatus since Marshall's move from the MAC to C-USA in 2005. The teams were both members of the Mid-American Conference from 1997 to 2004 and were meeting for the 53rd time. Marshall and Ohio planned to renew their rivalry in 2010.

This marked Ohio's first trip to the Little Caesars Pizza Bowl and only the fourth time in the school's history that they appeared in a bowl game. Marshall was playing in its fifth Little Caesars Pizza Bowl but first since joining Conference USA, as they had qualified for the then-Motor City Bowl in its first four playings as MAC Champions. In those four games Marshall had only lost once. Marshall was coached by its defensive coordinator/interim head coach, Rick Minter. Minter, who was previously the head coach for the Cincinnati Bearcats took over as Marshall's temporary head coach after Mark Snyder resigned at the conclusion of the regular season.

== Game summary ==
Ohio wore their home green jerseys and Marshall wore their white away jerseys.

Defense dominated the game as Marshall was held to 275 yards of total offense, while Ohio only managed 123, including just 12 yards rushing. Ohio also recovered a fumble for a touchdown and Marshall returned a punt for a score. Marshall's Martin Ward was named the game's MVP as he rushed for 72 yards on nine carries and recorded two touchdowns. Theo Scott threw for 111 yards and a touchdown pass to lead the Bobcats.

The bowl game drew a record-low 30,311 fans. Just two years before, more than twice as many people watched Purdue beat Central Michigan in Detroit. The game attracted fewer than 40,000 only once before when Marshall beat Louisville in 1998 at the Pontiac Silverdome.

=== Scoring summary ===
Scoring Play	Score
1st Quarter
MAR – Martin Ward 12-yard run (Craig Ratanamorn kick), 1:17	MAR 7–0
MAR – Andre Booker 58-yard punt return (Craig Ratanamorn kick), 0:00	MAR 14–0
2nd Quarter
MAR – Martin Ward 2-yard run (Craig Ratanamorn kick), 7:50	MAR 21–0
OHIO – Shannon Ballard 75-yard fumble recovery return (Matt Weller kick), 5:25	MAR 21–7
3rd Quarter
OHIO – Terrence McCrae 8-yard pass from Theo Scott (Matt Weller kick), 7:11	MAR 21–14
OHIO – Matt Weller 46 yard, 4:38	MAR 21–17
4th Quarter
No scoring	MAR 21–17
