= Dave Juenger =

American football player (born 1951)

No. 38
- Position: Wide receiver

Personal information
- Born: February 4, 1951 (age 75); Chillicothe, Ohio, U.S.
- Listed height: 6 ft 1 in (1.85 m)
- Listed weight: 195 lb (88 kg)

Career information
- High school: Unioto
- College: Ohio
- NFL draft: 1973: 14th round, 345th overall pick

Career history
- Chicago Bears (1973)
- Stats at Pro Football Reference

David William Juenger (born February 4, 1951) is an American former professional football player who was a wide receiver for the Chicago Bears of the National Football League (NFL). He played college football for the Ohio Bobcats.
