= Cleve Bryant =

American football player and coach (1947–2023)

Biographical details
- Born: March 27, 1947; Canton, Ohio, U.S.
- Died: January 31, 2023 (aged 75)

Playing career
- 1965–1969: Ohio
- Position: Quarterback

Coaching career (HC unless noted)
- 1977: Miami (OH) (QB/WR)
- 1978–1981: North Carolina (QB/WR)
- 1982–1984: New England (RB)
- 1985–1989: Ohio
- 1990–1991: Illinois (WR)
- 1992–1994: Texas (WR)
- 1995–1997: North Carolina (WR/recruiting)

Administrative career (AD unless noted)
- 1998–1999: Texas (assistant AD)
- 2000–2011: Texas (associate AD)

Head coaching record
- Overall: 9–44–2

Accomplishments and honors

Awards
- MAC Offensive Player of the Year (1968)

Cleve Bryant (March 27, 1947 – January 31, 2023) was an American college football player and coach. He served as the head football coach at Ohio University from 1985 to 1989. Bryant was later the Associate Athletics Director for Football Operations for the Texas Longhorns football team. His responsibilities ranged from administrative operations to scheduling, as well as day-to-day operations of the football team and its facilities. Bryant worked for Mack Brown at the University of North Carolina at Chapel Hill and followed Brown to the University of Texas at Austin in 1998. Bryant was the wide receiver coach at Texas under John Mackovic from 1992 to 1994, before he joined Brown's staff at North Carolina.

== Playing career ==
Bryant attended Ohio University, where he earned all-conference honors in 1967 as the quarterback, while leading the Bobcats to a conference title. The Bobcats repeated the feat the following year, and Bryant went on to earn the Mid-American Conference Player of the Year honors.

Bryant was drafted 271st overall by the Denver Broncos in the 11th round during 1970 NFL draft, but he did not make the team.

Bryant was inducted into the Ohio University Hall of Fame in 1975 and to the Citrus Bowl Hall of Fame in 1988.

== Coaching career ==
Bryant's college coaching career began in 1977 at Miami University, where he coached quarterbacks and wide receivers. The following year, he left to accept a position coaching the quarterbacks at the University of North Carolina at Chapel Hill. From 1978 to 1981 the Tar Heels went to three post-season bowl games and won the Atlantic Coast Conference title in 1980, going 7–0 in conference play and 11–1 overall. In 1982, Bryant left Chapel Hill to become the running backs coach for the New England Patriots. During his two seasons coaching the Patriots running backs New England finished 2nd and 5th in rushing, compared to 15th in 1981 and 11th in 1984.

In late 1984, Bryant was hired as the head coach by Ohio University, his alma mater, becoming only the third black head football coach in NCAA. Division I history. Bryant posted a 2–9 record during his first season in 1985, followed by back-to-back 1–10 performances in 1986 and 1987. The Bobcats improved to 4–6–1 in 1988, but fell to 1–9–1 in Bryant's final season as Ohio's head coach. Bryant compiled a 9–44–2 (.182) record during his five seasons coaching Ohio.

While readily admitting his less-than-stellar record in the win-loss department, Bryant still believed he had something to be proud of from those days.

"I think we made a difference, mostly negative, in the lives of some young people," he said. "We did not win enough ball games. We were not good enough athletically to win enough games for them to be able to keep me, and I totally understand that."

Though his won-loss record wasn't anywhere near the best in the nation, he said, the academic performance and graduation rates of his players were. One of his fondest memories, he said, was of a game against Eastern Michigan.

"It was toward the end of the year, and kids had final exams," he recalled. "I had to call a timeout, so they could go take final exams. And that included starters! But the expectation was the same - win the game."

== Personal life and death ==
Bryant was married to Jean Bryant, a long-time academic advisor to the University of Texas football program.

Bryant died on January 31, 2023, at the age of 75.

== Head coaching record ==
Year	Team	Overall	Conference	Standing	Bowl/playoffs
Ohio Bobcats (Mid-American Conference) (1985–1989)
1985	Ohio	2–9	2–7	10th	
1986	Ohio	1–10	0–8	10th	
1987	Ohio	1–10	0–8	9th	
1988	Ohio	4–6–1	4–3–1	5th	
1989	Ohio	1–9–1	1–6–1	8th	
Ohio:		9–44–2	7–32–2		
Total:		9–44–2			
