= Frank Solich =

American football player and coach (born 1944)

Biographical details
- Born: September 8, 1944 (age 82); Johnstown, Pennsylvania, U.S.

Playing career
- 1963–1965: Nebraska
- Position: Fullback

Coaching career (HC unless noted)
- 1966–1967: Omaha Holy Name HS (NE)
- 1968–1978: Lincoln Southeast HS (NE)
- 1979–1982: Nebraska (freshmen)
- 1983–1997: Nebraska (RB)
- 1998–2003: Nebraska
- 2005–2020: Ohio

Head coaching record
- Overall: 173–101 (college)
- Bowls: 7–9

Accomplishments and honors

Championships
- Big 12 (1999); 3 Big 12 North Division (1999–2001); 4 MAC East Division (2006, 2009, 2011, 2016)

Awards
- Home Depot Coach of the Year Award (1999); 2× Big 12 Coach of the Year (1999, 2001); MAC Coach of the Year (2006); First-team All-Big Eight (1965)
- College Football Hall of Fame; Inducted in 2024 (profile)

Frank Thomas Solich (born September 8, 1944) is an American former college football coach and former player. He was the head coach at Ohio University, a position he held from 2005 until 2021. From 1998 to 2003, Solich served as the head coach at the University of Nebraska–Lincoln, where he also played fullback under Bob Devaney in the mid-1960s. He served as a high school coach for over ten years before being hired as an assistant coach at Nebraska in 1979, where he would serve for the next 19 years. He won the Big 12 Conference championship as head coach in 1999 and reached the BCS National Championship Game in 2002. With Ohio, he led the team to multiple division championships and 115 wins, third-most by a coach in program history. He led them to a bowl game in eleven of his sixteen seasons, which included their first bowl win in program history in 2011. He retired in 2020 and currently serves as a special assistant to the athletic director for Ohio. With a record of 173–101, he was inducted to the College Football Hall of Fame in 2024.

== Early life and playing career ==
Solich grew up in Cleveland, Ohio, and graduated from Holy Name High School in 1962, where he earned all-state, All-America, and all-scholastic honors. He scored 104 points in high school but was being overlooked due his height, 5'7", and weight, 153 lbs. When he got to his college weigh-in he got his trainer to tape eight-pound weights under his shorts; he ultimately made weight at 162 pounds. He was a part of Bob Devaney’s first recruiting class at Nebraska, and became a standout for the Huskers in the mid-1960s, where he earned the nickname "Fearless Frankie". An All-Big Eight fullback and co-captain of the Huskers’ 1965 team, his playing career earned him induction into the Nebraska Football Hall of Fame in 1992. In Nebraska's 27–17 win over Air Force in 1965, he ran for 204 yards on 17 carries, becoming the first Husker to run for 200 yards in a game, and subsequently the first Husker to be featured on the cover of Sports Illustrated. After finishing his degree in 1966, Solich had aspired to become an agent for the Federal Bureau of Investigation but he soon received an offer to coach and decided to give coaching a try.

== Coaching career ==
=== High school ===
He began his career in the Nebraska prep ranks, as head coach at Omaha Holy Name High School in 1966 and 1967. His 1967 team was state runner-up. Solich then moved to Lincoln Southeast for 11 years, where he compiled a record of 66–33–5 while capturing consecutive Class A state titles in 1976 and 1977.

=== Nebraska ===
Solich returned to college football at his alma mater in 1979, spending 19 seasons at Nebraska as an assistant coach under Tom Osborne: four as the freshman team coach, and 15 as running backs coach. In Solich's 19 years as an assistant, the Huskers captured 3 national championships and 11 conference titles. He was the position coach for many of Nebraska's standout running backs of the 1980s and 1990s, including Tom Rathman, Calvin Jones, Ahman Green, and Lawrence Phillips.

Osborne retired after the 1997 co-national championship season and named Solich as his successor. Solich directed the Huskers to six consecutive bowl games, including his 2001 squad, which started 11–0 but was beaten by Colorado 62–36 in the last regular season game. Despite that loss and failing to qualify for the Big 12 championship game, the Huskers still made it into the national championship game (ahead of #3 Colorado and #2 Oregon) in the Rose Bowl against Miami. Nebraska was beaten 37–14. Solich did win at least nine games in five of those six seasons, and finished among the top 10 teams in the nation three times. Solich compiled a 58–19 record (.753) at Nebraska.

Solich's 1999 Huskers defeated the Texas Longhorns for the Big 12 championship. Solich was named the Big 12 Coach of the Year in 1999 and 2001, and was one of seven finalists for the Paul "Bear" Bryant Award in 2001.

For the first five years as head coach, Solich served as his own offensive coordinator, as Osborne had for most of his tenure. His offenses centered on the option. He also utilized such plays as the Black 41 Flash Reverse which became a highlight of Eric Crouch's Heisman Trophy-winning season in 2001.

The Huskers slumped to 7–7 in 2002, a year in which they fell out of the rankings for the first time since 1981; their 348 consecutive weeks in the AP Poll is still the longest in college football history. It was the first time they had not won nine games in a season since 1968. The .500 finish snapped a streak of 40 consecutive winning seasons for the Cornhuskers, which is also a record. He gave up offensive play-calling duties to newly hired offensive coordinator Barney Cotton and brought in Bo Pelini, the linebackers coach for the Green Bay Packers, as defensive coordinator. 2003 began with Nebraska starting out 5–0, but suffered three key losses later in the year: 41–24 to Missouri, 31–7 to Texas and 38–9 to Kansas State. After winning the final game of the regular season, Solich was fired by new athletic director Steve Pederson.

Solich's 58 wins during his first six seasons as Nebraska's head coach exceeded those of his predecessors, Bob Devaney (53 wins) and Osborne (55 wins), both of whom are in the College Football Hall of Fame.

=== Ohio ===
Solich took the 2004 season off, the first time he'd been away from the game in 39 years. He turned down a job offer from Army during this time. On December 16, 2004, Solich was hired at Ohio University in Athens on a multiyear contract with a base salary estimated at $240,000. Solich arrived when renovation plans for the Ohio football facilities, which had begun eight years earlier (prior to 2004, the program was furnished with new coaches office, practice fields, a new 10,000 square-foot strength and conditioning center, enhancement to the team locker room, revitalization of Peden Stadium including installation of a state-of-the-art FieldTurf playing surface, improved and expanded seating complete with a popular concert-style berm at the south end zone) were nearly complete. They were finished with two final projects, new team meeting rooms and a new athletic training room. Fan interest in the program was revitalized and reached its highest since the 2001 season. Also, Ohio was selected to appear on national television six times for the 2005 football season, a record for the program. Solich's first home game as coach of the Bobcats was a memorable one, as Peden Stadium brought in its largest crowd ever. 24,545 fans were in attendance on September 9, 2005, to watch the Bobcats defeat the Pittsburgh Panthers, 16–10. The Pittsburgh–Ohio game was among the top 15 most viewed regular season college football games ever on ESPN2.

The Bobcats' 2005 record under Solich (4–7) was the same as the team's record in the previous year under Brian Knorr. However, in 2006, Solich led the Bobcats to a 9–5 record including a MAC East Division title and a GMAC Bowl invitation. The bowl game (which Ohio lost to Southern Miss, 28–7) was the program's first bowl appearance since 1968.

In the 2007 season, the Bobcats took a step backward and finished with a record of 6–6. Two of those losses were by less than three points, and a third was a 28–7 loss to nationally ranked Virginia Tech. The Bobcats were one of six bowl eligible teams that missed the postseason.

On July 18, 2008, Solich was given an extension of his contract through the 2013 season.

In 2009, Solich led the Bobcats to a 9–5 overall mark with another MAC East championship and an appearance in the Little Caesars Pizza Bowl. That 2009 senior class amassed more wins (28) than any other Ohio football class in more than 40 years.

In 2011, Solich coached the Bobcats to a 10–4 record, another MAC East Division title, and their first ever bowl win. The Bobcats defeated Utah State 24–23 in the Famous Idaho Potato Bowl. It was Ohio's first ten win season since 1968.

During the 2012 season, Solich coached the Bobcats to a 7–0 start, which saw their first Associated Press Top 25 weekly ranking since 1968, as well as a spot in the weekly coaches poll. In October 2018, Coach Solich celebrated his 100th win at Ohio University. Later that year, he passed Bill Hess as the second-winningest coach in school history. A 66–24 victory over Bowling Green in November 2019 gave Solich his 111th win as Ohio coach, making him the winningest coach in MAC history.

In 2021, Solich stepped down as head coach of the program to focus on his health. He retired with a career record of 173–101 (0.631) with a record of 115–82 (0.584) at Ohio. His long time assistant Tim Albin was promoted to replace him. He currently serves as a special assistant to the Athletic Director at Ohio.

Prior to the 2022 season Ohio University installed new turf in Peden Stadium. The field at Peden was now christened "Frank Solich Field" Through the completion of the 2025 season Ohio is 23–1 on the new field.

On January 8, 2023, Solich was announced as a member the 2024 College Football Hall of Fame class. In 2024, he was inducted into the Croatian American Sports Hall of Fame.

== Personal life ==
Solich married Pamela Wieck of Beatrice, Nebraska. They have two children, Cindy and Jeff.

In 2005, police in Athens, Ohio found Solich passed out behind the wheel of his car, facing the wrong direction on a one-way street. Solich was convicted of drunken driving, resulting in a $250 fine and driver's license suspension. He attempted to fight this based on testing that revealed the "date rape" drug GHB in his system. His attempt to withdraw his plea failed.

== Head coaching record ==
=== College ===
Year	Team	Overall	Conference	Standing	Bowl/playoffs	Coaches^{#}	AP^{°}
Nebraska Cornhuskers (Big 12 Conference) (1998–2003)
1998	Nebraska	9–4	5–3	T–2nd (North)	L Holiday	20	19
1999	Nebraska	12–1	7–1	1st (North)	W Fiesta^{†}	2	3
2000	Nebraska	10–2	6–2	T–1st (North)	W Alamo	7	8
2001	Nebraska	11–2	7–1	T–1st (North)	L Rose^{†}	7	8
2002	Nebraska	7–7	3–5	4th (North)	L Independence		
2003	Nebraska	9–3*	5–3	2nd (North)	Alamo*	18	19
Nebraska:		58–19	33–15	* Did not coach bowl game			
Ohio Bobcats (Mid-American Conference) (2005–2020)
2005	Ohio	4–7	3–5	4th (East)			
2006	Ohio	9–5	7–1	1st (East)	L GMAC		
2007	Ohio	6–6	4–4	T–4th (East)			
2008	Ohio	4–8	3–5	T–4th (East)			
2009	Ohio	9–5	7–1	1st (East)	L Little Caesars Pizza		
2010	Ohio	8–5	6–2	2nd (East)	L New Orleans		
2011	Ohio	10–4	6–2	1st (East)	W Famous Idaho Potato		
2012	Ohio	9–4	4–4	3rd (East)	W Independence		
2013	Ohio	7–6	4–4	T–3rd (East)	L Beef 'O' Brady's		
2014	Ohio	6–6	4–4	2nd (East)			
2015	Ohio	8–5	5–3	T–2nd (East)	L Camellia		
2016	Ohio	8–6	6–2	T–1st (East)	L Dollar General		
2017	Ohio	9–4	5–3	2nd (East)	W Bahamas		
2018	Ohio	9–4	6–2	T–2nd (East)	W Frisco		
2019	Ohio	7–6	5–3	T–2nd (East)	W Famous Idaho Potato		
2020	Ohio	2–1	2–1	T–3rd (East)			
Ohio:		115–82	77–46				
Total:		173–101					
National championship Conference title Conference division title or championship game berth
^{†}Indicates BCS bowl.; ^{#}Rankings from final Coaches Poll.; ^{°}Rankings from final AP Poll.
