= Josiah Yazdani =

American gridiron football player (born 1991)

No. 10
- Position: Kicker

Personal information
- Born: November 29, 1991 (age 34); Albany, Ohio
- Listed height: 5 ft 10 in (1.78 m)
- Listed weight: 190 lb (86 kg)

Career information
- High school: Alexander (OH)
- College: Ohio
- NFL draft: 2016: undrafted

Career history
- Cleveland Gladiators (2017)

Career AFL statistics
- FG made: 0
- FG att: 0
- PAT made: 11
- PAT att: 15
- Tackles: 0
- Stats at ArenaFan.com

Josiah Yazdani (born November 29, 1991) is a former gridiron football placekicker. He was a member of the Cleveland Gladiators of the Arena Football League (AFL).

== College career ==
Yazdani committed to Ohio University and played four years for the Ohio Bobcats football team. He graduated in 2015 ranked second all-time in field goals made at Ohio, with 47.

== Professional career ==
On April 28, 2017, Yazdani signed with the Cleveland Gladiators of the Arena Football League for the 2017 Arena Football League season.
