= 2012 Ohio Bobcats football team =

American college football season

2012 Ohio Bobcats football

Independence Bowl champion

Independence Bowl, W 45–14 vs. Louisiana–Monroe
- Conference: Mid-American Conference
- East Division
- Record: 9–4 (4–4 MAC)
- Head coach: Frank Solich (8th season)
- Co-offensive coordinators: Tim Albin (8th season); Gerry Gdowski (3rd season)
- Offensive scheme: Spread option
- Defensive coordinator: Jim Burrow (8th season)
- Base defense: 4-3
- Home stadium: Peden Stadium

2012 Mid-American Conference football standings
	Conf.			Overall
Team	W		L	W		L
East Division
Kent State x	8	–	0	11	–	3
Bowling Green	6	–	2	8	–	5
Ohio	4	–	4	9	–	4
Buffalo	3	–	5	4	–	8
Miami (OH)	3	–	5	4	–	8
UMass	1	–	7	1	–	11
Akron	0	–	8	1	–	11
West Division
No. 22 Northern Illinois x$	8	–	0	12	–	2
Toledo	6	–	2	9	–	4
Ball State	6	–	2	9	–	4
Central Michigan	4	–	4	7	–	6
Western Michigan	2	–	6	4	–	8
Eastern Michigan	1	–	7	2	–	10
Championship: Northern Illinois 44, Kent State 37
$ – Conference champion and BCS representative as top non-AQ school to meet automatic qualification criteria; x – Division champion/co-champions; UMass not eligible for conference title or bowl game as part of FBS transition; Rankings from AP Poll

The 2012 Ohio Bobcats football team represented Ohio University in the 2012 NCAA Division I FBS football season. They were led by eighth-year head coach Frank Solich and played their home games at Peden Stadium. They were a member of the East Division of the Mid-American Conference (MAC). After defeating Akron on October 13 to become 7–0 the Bobcats were ranked #25 in the AP Poll; Ohio had not been ranked nationally since 1968. On October 21, 2012, the Bobcats peaked at #23 in both the Coaches Poll and AP Poll, and #24 in the BCS standings. They finished the season 9–4, 4–4 in MAC play to finish in third place in the East Division. They were invited to the Independence Bowl where they defeated Louisiana–Monroe for their second consecutive bowl victory.

== Schedule ==
Date	Time	Opponent	Rank	Site	TV	Result	Attendance
September 1	12:00 p.m.	at Penn State*		Beaver Stadium; State College, PA	ESPN	W 24–14	97,186
September 8	7:00 p.m.	New Mexico State*		Peden Stadium; Athens, OH	ESPN3	W 51–24	25,893
September 15	6:30 p.m.	at Marshall*		Joan C. Edwards Stadium; Huntington, WV (Battle for the Bell)		W 27–24	33,436
September 22	2:00 p.m.	Norfolk State*		Peden Stadium; Athens, OH	ESPN3	W 44–10	23,673
September 29	3:30 p.m.	at Massachusetts		Gillette Stadium; Foxborough, MA	ESPN3	W 37–34	8,321
October 6	12:00 p.m.	Buffalo		Peden Stadium; Athens, OH	ESPN+/CSS	W 38–31	20,044
October 13	2:00 p.m.	Akron^{†}		Peden Stadium; Athens, OH	ESPN3	W 34–28	25,542
October 27	3:30 p.m.	at Miami (OH)	No. 23	Yager Stadium; Oxford, OH (Battle of the Bricks)	STO/ESPN3	L 20–23	19,326
November 1	6:00 p.m.	Eastern Michigan		Peden Stadium; Athens, OH	ESPNU	W 45–14	16,789
November 7	8:00 p.m.	Bowling Green		Peden Stadium; Athens, OH	ESPN2	L 14–26	19,122
November 14	8:00 p.m.	at Ball State		Scheumann Stadium; Muncie, IN	ESPNU	L 27–52	10,097
November 23	11:00 a.m.	at No. 23 Kent State		Dix Stadium; Kent, OH	ESPNU	L 6–28	18,230
December 28	2:00 p.m.	vs. Louisiana–Monroe*		Independence Stadium; Shreveport, LA (Independence Bowl)	ESPN	W 45–14	41,853
*Non-conference game; ^{†}Homecoming; Rankings from AP Poll released prior to the game; All times are in Eastern time

- Source: Schedule

== Rankings ==
Ranking movements Legend: ██ Increase in ranking ██ Decrease in ranking — = Not ranked RV = Received votes
	Week															
Poll	Pre	1	2	3	4	5	6	7	8	9	10	11	12	13	14	Final
AP	—	RV	RV	RV	RV	RV	RV	25	23	RV	RV	—	—	—	—	—
Coaches	—	RV	RV	RV	RV	RV	RV	RV	23	RV	RV	—	—	—	—	—
Harris	Not released						RV	RV	23	RV	RV	—	—	—	—	Not released
BCS	Not released							—	24	—	—	—	—	—	—	Not released

== Game summaries ==
=== @ Penn State ===
	1	2	3	4	Total
Bobcats	0	3	14	7	24
Nittany Lions	7	7	0	0	14

=== New Mexico State ===
	1	2	3	4	Total
Aggies	7	7	10	0	24
Bobcats	7	14	24	6	51

=== @ Marshall ===
	1	2	3	4	Total
Bobcats	0	17	0	10	27
Thundering Herd	14	0	7	3	24

=== Norfolk State ===
	1	2	3	4	Total
Spartans	0	0	0	10	10
Bobcats	24	10	10	0	44

=== @ Massachusetts ===
	1	2	3	4	Total
Bobcats	3	17	0	17	37
Minutemen	10	7	10	7	34

=== Buffalo ===
	1	2	3	4	Total
Bulls	14	0	10	7	31
Bobcats	7	14	3	14	38

=== Akron ===
	1	2	3	4	Total
Zips	0	7	7	14	28
Bobcats	14	6	14	0	34

=== @ Miami (OH) ===
	1	2	3	4	Total
#23 Bobcats	7	7	3	3	20
RedHawks	13	7	0	3	23

=== Eastern Michigan ===
	1	2	3	4	Total
Eagles	7	7	0	0	14
Bobcats	7	17	7	14	45

=== Bowling Green ===
	1	2	3	4	Total
Falcons	0	19	0	7	26
Bobcats	7	0	7	0	14

=== @ Ball State ===
	1	2	3	4	Total
Bobcats	3	14	7	3	27
Cardinals	7	14	10	21	52

=== @ Kent State ===
	1	2	3	4	Total
Bobcats	3	3	0	0	6
#25 Golden Flashes	21	0	0	7	28

=== Louisiana–Monroe–Independence Bowl ===
	1	2	3	4	Total
Bobcats	14	10	14	7	45
Warhawks	7	0	0	7	14
