= Papi White =

Canadian gridiron football player (born 1996)

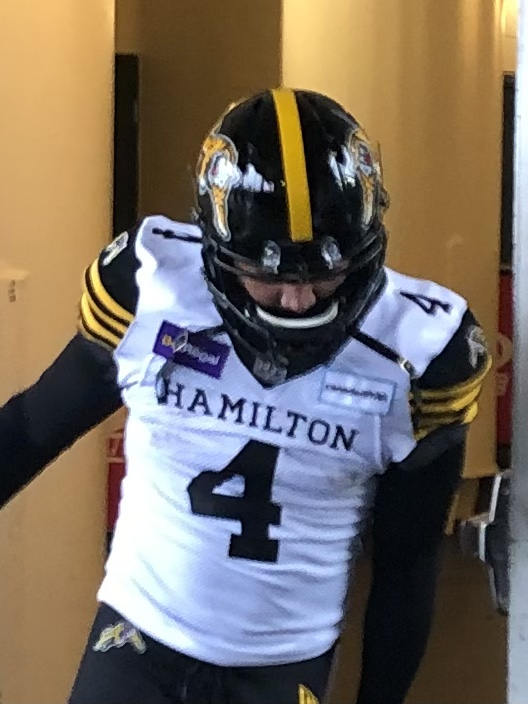
- White with the Hamilton Tiger-Cats in 2021

No. 4
- Positions: Wide receiver, kick returner

Personal information
- Born: July 19, 1996 (age 30); Seminole, Oklahoma, U.S.
- Listed height: 5 ft 9 in (1.75 m)
- Listed weight: 170 lb (77 kg)

Career information
- High school: Seminole
- College: Ohio
- NFL draft: 2019: undrafted

Career history
- 2019: Jacksonville Jaguars*
- 2019: Tennessee Titans*
- 2020–2022: Hamilton Tiger-Cats
- * Offseason or practice squad member only

Awards and highlights
- Second-team All-MAC (2017)
- Stats at Pro Football Reference
- Stats at CFL.ca

Papi White (born July 19, 1996) is an American former professional football wide receiver and kick returner who played for the Hamilton Tiger-Cats of the Canadian Football League (CFL).

== College career ==
White played college football for the Ohio Bobcats from 2014 to 2018. Over the course of his collegiate career, he played in 43 games and recorded 161 receptions for a school-record 2,620 receiving yards and 19 touchdowns.

== Professional career ==
=== Jacksonville Jaguars ===
After going unselected in the 2019 NFL draft, White signed as an undrafted free agent with the Jacksonville Jaguars on April 28, 2019. However, he was released two weeks later on May 12, 2019.

=== Tennessee Titans ===
White signed with the Tennessee Titans on July 31, 2019, and was assigned to the team's practice roster following training camp. He was later released on October 8, 2019.

=== Hamilton Tiger-Cats ===
White was signed by the Hamilton Tiger-Cats on April 8, 2020, but did not play in 2020 due to the cancellation of the 2020 CFL season. He began the 2021 season on the practice roster, but was soon promoted to the team's active roster in Week 2 and made his professional debut on August 14, 2021, against the Saskatchewan Roughriders where he had one catch for 18 yards and two carries for 12 yards. He returned to the practice roster, but in his next game, on September 10, 2021, against the Toronto Argonauts, he scored his first career touchdown on a 39-yard reception from Dane Evans. He played in five regular season games in 2021 where he had 11 receptions for 105 yards and one touchdown, 13 carries for 43 yards, six punt returns for 90 yards, and one kickoff return for 23 yards. In the East Final playoff game, White had a 92-yard punt return touchdown which sparked a second half comeback win against the Toronto Argonauts. On June 3, 2023, White was released by the Tiger-Cats.

== Personal life ==
White is the son of Titania and Amari White and has two younger sisters, Deja and Malayja'.
