= 2009 Ohio Bobcats football team =

American college football season

2009 Ohio Bobcats football

MAC East Division co-champion

MAC Championship Game, L 10–20 vs Central Michigan

Little Caesars Pizza Bowl, L 17–21 vs Marshall
- Conference: Mid-American Conference
- East
- Record: 9–5 (7–1 MAC)
- Head coach: Frank Solich (5th season)
- Co-offensive coordinators: Tim Albin (5th season); Gerry Gdowski (1st season)
- Defensive coordinator: Jim Burrow (5th season)
- Home stadium: Peden Stadium (Capacity: 24,000)

2009 Mid-American Conference football standings
	Conf.			Overall
Team	W		L	W		L
East Division
Ohio xy	7	–	1	9	–	5
Temple x	7	–	1	9	–	4
Bowling Green	6	–	2	7	–	6
Kent State	4	–	4	5	–	7
Buffalo	3	–	5	5	–	7
Akron	2	–	6	3	–	9
Miami (OH)	1	–	7	1	–	11
West Division
No. 23 Central Michigan x$	8	–	0	12	–	2
Northern Illinois	5	–	3	7	–	6
Western Michigan	4	–	4	5	–	7
Toledo	3	–	5	5	–	7
Ball State	2	–	6	2	–	10
Eastern Michigan	0	–	8	0	–	12
Championship: Central Michigan 20, Ohio 10
$ – Conference champion; x – Division champion/co-champions; y – Championship game participant; Rankings from AP Poll

The 2009 Ohio Bobcats football team competed on behalf of Ohio University during the 2009 NCAA Division I FBS football season. The Bobcats were led by head coach Frank Solich and played their home games in Peden Stadium located in Athens, Ohio.

The Bobcats finished the season 9–5, 7–1 in MAC play to be co-champions of the east division. Ohio represented the east division in the MAC Championship Game, losing to Central Michigan 20–10. The Bobcats were invited to the Little Caesars Pizza Bowl, losing to Marshall 21–17.

== Schedule ==
Date	Time	Opponent	Site	TV	Result	Attendance
September 5	7:00 pm	UConn*	Peden Stadium; Athens, OH	ESPN360	L 16–23	24,617
September 12	7:00 pm	at North Texas*	Fouts Field; Denton, TX	KTXA	W 31–30 ^{2OT}	16,674
September 19	7:00 pm	No. 12 (FCS) Cal Poly*	Peden Stadium; Athens, OH		W 28–10	16,018
September 26	7:00 pm	at Tennessee*	Neyland Stadium; Knoxville, TN		L 23–34	95,535
October 3	4:00 pm	at Bowling Green	Doyt Perry Stadium; Bowling Green, OH		W 44–37	14,071
October 10	6:00 pm	at Akron	InfoCision Stadium; Akron, OH		W 19–7	16,381
October 17	2:00 pm	Miami (OH)^{†}	Peden Stadium; Athens, OH (Battle of the Bricks)		W 28–7	20,188
October 24	2:00 pm	Kent State	Peden Stadium; Athens, OH		L 11–20	17,968
October 31	12:00 pm	at Ball State	Scheumann Stadium; Muncie, IN		W 20–17	7,321
November 10	7:00 pm	at Buffalo	UB Stadium; Buffalo, NY	ESPN2	W 27–24	13,032
November 21	2:00 pm	Northern Illinois	Peden Stadium; Athens, OH		W 38–31	14,756
November 27	11:00 am	Temple	Peden Stadium; Athens, OH	ESPNU	W 35–17	14,135
December 4	8:00 pm	vs. Central Michigan	Ford Field; Detroit, MI (MAC Championship Game)	ESPN2	L 10–20	23,714
December 26	1:00 pm	vs. Marshall*	Ford Field; Detroit, MI (Little Caesars Pizza Bowl / Battle for the Bell)	ESPN	L 17–21	30,311
*Non-conference game; ^{†}Homecoming; Rankings from AP / Coaches Polls released prior to game.; All times are in Eastern time
