= 2008 Ohio Bobcats football team =

American college football season

2008 Ohio Bobcats football
- Conference: Mid-American Conference
- East Division
- Record: 4–8 (3–5 MAC)
- Head coach: Frank Solich (4th season)
- Offensive coordinator: Tim Albin (4th season)
- Defensive coordinator: Jim Burrow (4th season)
- Home stadium: Peden Stadium

2008 Mid-American Conference football standings
	Conf.			Overall
Team	W		L	W		L
East Division
Buffalo x$	5	–	3	8	–	6
Bowling Green	4	–	4	6	–	6
Temple	4	–	4	5	–	7
Ohio	3	–	5	4	–	8
Akron	3	–	5	5	–	7
Kent State	3	–	5	4	–	8
Miami (OH)	1	–	7	2	–	10
West Division
Ball State x	8	–	0	12	–	2
Central Michigan	6	–	2	8	–	5
Western Michigan	6	–	2	9	–	4
Northern Illinois	5	–	3	6	–	7
Toledo	2	–	6	3	–	9
Eastern Michigan	2	–	6	3	–	9
Championship: Buffalo 42, Ball State 24
$ – Conference champion; x – Division champion/co-champions

The 2008 Ohio Bobcats football team represented Ohio University during the 2008 NCAA Division I FBS football season. Ohio competed as a member of the East Division of the Mid-American Conference (MAC). The Bobcats were led by Frank Solich in his fourth year. They played their home games in Peden Stadium in Athens, Ohio.

== Schedule ==
Date	Time	Opponent	Site	TV	Result	Attendance
August 30	2:00 pm	at Wyoming*	War Memorial Stadium; Laramie, WY	The Mountain	L 20–21	20,430
September 6	12:00 pm	at No. 3 Ohio State*	Ohio Stadium; Columbus, OH	ESPN	L 14–26	105,002
September 13	2:00 pm	Central Michigan	Peden Stadium; Athens, OH		L 28–31	18,268
September 20	12:00 pm	at Northwestern*	Ryan Field; Evanston, IL	BTN	L 8–16	22,069
September 27	2:00 pm	VMI*^{†}	Peden Stadium; Athens, OH		W 51–31	19,938
October 4	2:00 pm	at Western Michigan	Waldo Stadium; Kalamazoo, MI		L 20–41	20,133
October 11	2:30 pm	at Kent State	Dix Stadium; Kent, OH	FSN Ohio	W 26–19	16,825
October 21	8:00 pm	at Temple	Lincoln Financial Field; Philadelphia, PA	ESPN2	L 10–14	18,824
October 28	7:00 pm	Buffalo	Peden Stadium; Athens, OH	ESPNU	L 19–32	10,042
November 8	2:00 pm	Bowling Green	Peden Stadium; Athens, OH		L 3–28	15,018
November 22	3:30 pm	Akron	Peden Stadium; Athens, OH		W 49–42	13,114
November 28	12:30 pm	at Miami (OH)	Yager Stadium; Oxford, OH (Battle of the Bricks)	ESPNU	W 41–26	13,867
*Non-conference game; ^{†}Homecoming; Rankings from AP Poll released prior to the game; All times are in Eastern time
