= Donte Foster =

American football player (born 1990)

No. 2, 3
- Position: Wide receiver

Personal information
- Born: November 10, 1990 (age 35); Guthrie, Oklahoma, U.S.
- Listed height: 6 ft 1 in (1.85 m)
- Listed weight: 199 lb (90 kg)

Career information
- High school: Guthrie
- College: Ohio
- NFL draft: 2014: undrafted

Career history
- Minnesota Vikings (2014–2015)*; San Diego Chargers (2015)*; Dallas Cowboys (2015)*; New York Giants (2016)*; Tennessee Titans (2016)*
- * Offseason or practice squad member only
- Stats at Pro Football Reference

Donte Foster (born November 10, 1990) is an American former football wide receiver. He played college basketball at Seminole State College and college football at Ohio. After going undrafted in the 2014 NFL draft, Foster signed with the Minnesota Vikings as a free agent.

== Early life ==
Foster attended Guthrie High School in Guthrie, Oklahoma, where he was a three-sport star in football, basketball and track. As a junior, Foster, who played for head coach Rafe Watkins, helped lead the Bluejays to a Class 5A state title. As a senior, he was named All-Oklahoma after leading Class 5A in receiving yards and earned all-star honors from the OFBCA (Oklahoma Football Coaches Association) and CoachesAid.com, a website and media outlet dedicated to high school sports coverage since 1999. He was also a quarterfinalist for Oklahoma's Mr. Football honor during his senior season. During his junior and senior seasons at Guthrie, Foster amassed 80 catches for 1,408 yards with 25 touchdown catches and also totaled 163 yards on the ground for three more scores.

On the hardwood, Foster began his career with a bang when he was named Oklahoma's Newcomer of the Year as a freshman. Under the leadership of head coach Pete Papahronis, he then claimed All-Oklahoma honors three times (sophomore, junior and senior) and was named Class 5A Player of the Year as a junior. He was also voted Most Valuable Player of the state playoffs as a senior, where he averaged a double-double. His Guthrie Bluejays won the Class 5A state title during both his junior and senior campaigns. In addition, Foster had the No. 1 play on ESPN’s SportsCenter when he made a shot with his back to the basket during a high school basketball game.

Foster also excelled in track & field at Guthrie, where he earned All-Oklahoma honors all three years. He was Class 5A's three-time (sophomore, junior and senior) state champion in the high jump, where he cleared a career-best of 2.13 meters (7 feet, 0 inches) during his senior season. He also had personal-bests of 22.69 seconds in the 200-meter dash and 6.49 meters (21 feet, 3 inches) in the long jump at the 2009 Regional Meet.

== College career ==
=== Seminole State College ===
Foster played college basketball at Seminole State College before transferring to Ohio. At Seminole State, Foster averaged 12.8 points, 7.8 rebounds, 2.1 steals and 1.8 assists per contest from his point guard position. He led the Trojans to the finals of the NJCAA (National Junior College Athletic Association) Region 2 Tournament, earning All-Tournament honors in the process.

=== Ohio University ===
Foster played in 51 games during his four-year career at Ohio. He finished with 2,170 receiving yards and 21 touchdowns on 167 receptions. After redshirting in 2009, Foster finished his 2010 season with nine catches for 151 yards and one score.

In 2011, Foster was a fixture on Ohio's receiving corps during the season, playing in 13 games. He hauled in 30 passes for 352 yards and five touchdowns.

In 2012, Foster finished the year with single season career highs of 659 yards receiving and eight touchdowns. His eight receiving touchdowns are tied for fifth all-time with former Bobcat wide receiver Todd Snyder, while his 59 receptions ranks fifth all-time in single season history.

In his final year at Ohio, Foster started in all 13 games, earning All-MAC Second-team honors. He became just the second wide receiver in school history to surpass 1,000 yards receiving in a single season as he finished the year with 1,018 yards. He set a Beef O'Brady's Bowl record with 160 yards receiving en route to earning Most Valuable Player honors.

== Professional career ==
Pre-draft measurables
| Height | Weight | 40-yard dash | 10-yard split | 20-yard split | 20-yard shuttle | Three-cone drill | Vertical jump | Broad jump | Bench press |
|---|---|---|---|---|---|---|---|---|---|
| 6 ft 1 in (1.85 m) | 193 lb (88 kg) | 4.47 s | 1.61 s | 2.56 s | 4.30 s | 6.79 s | 42 in (1.07 m) | 10 ft 10 in (3.30 m) | 14 reps |
All values from Pro Day

=== Minnesota Vikings ===
Foster signed with the Minnesota Vikings as a free agent following going undrafted in the 2014 NFL draft. On May 5, 2014, Foster was signed by the Vikings. On August 30, 2014, he was waived. On August 31, 2014, he was re-signed to the practice squad. On September 29, 2014, Foster was released. On October 7, 2014, he was re-signed to the practice squad. On December 30, 2014, Foster was signed a future contract. On September 5, 2015, Foster was waived. On September 29, 2015, he was signed to the Vikings' practice squad. On October 27, 2015, he was waived again.

=== San Diego Chargers ===
On November 18, 2015, Foster was signed to the San Diego Chargers' practice squad. On December 1, 2015, he was released from practice squad.

=== Dallas Cowboys ===
On December 30, 2015, the Dallas Cowboys signed Foster to their practice squad. He was waived on March 2, 2016.

=== New York Giants ===
On May 9, 2016, Foster signed with the New York Giants. On July 29, 2016, he was waived by the Giants.

=== Tennessee Titans ===
On August 17, 2016, Foster was signed by the Tennessee Titans. On August 28, 2016, he was released by the Titans.

== Personal life ==
While at Ohio University, Foster graduated with a degree in sociology-criminology.
