= Kalvin McRae =

American football player (born 1985)

Profile
- Position: Running back

Personal information
- Born: August 30, 1985 (age 41); Decatur, Georgia, U.S.
- Listed height: 5 ft 11 in (1.80 m)
- Listed weight: 208 lb (94 kg)

Career information
- High school: Avondale Estates (GA)
- College: Ohio
- NFL draft: 2008: undrafted

Career history
- Kansas City Chiefs (2008)*
- * Offseason or practice squad member only

Awards and highlights
- All-MAC (2005, 2006, 2007); Rivals.com All-MAC team (2006, 2007); MAC Offensive Player of The Year (2006, 2007)

Kalvin McRae (born August 30, 1985) is an American former football running back. He was released by the Kansas City Chiefs of the National Football League (NFL) prior to the beginning of training camp. He was originally signed by the Chiefs as an undrafted free agent on April 27, 2008. He played college football for the Bobcats of Ohio University.

== Early life ==
McRae is the son of Willie and Cheral. McRae attended Avondale High School in Avondale Estates, Georgia and was a student and a letterman in football, wrestling, and track. In football, he was named the teams' Most Valuable Player four times, was a three-time All-County selection, and as a senior, he was also a first team All-Region selection. In wrestling, McRae placed sixth at the State Tournament as a senior. Kelvin McRae graduated from Avondale High School in 2003.

== College career ==
As a player for the Ohio Bobcats, McRae finished his career as the school's leader in rushing yards (4,398), 100-yard rushing games (21), rush attempts (909), rushing yards per game (91.6), all-purpose yards (5,248) and tied for the total touchdowns mark (49). During his junior season, he helped lead the Bobcats to a MAC East Division title, a MAC Championship Game appearance, and a 2007 GMAC Bowl appearance. In 2007, he set single-season school records with 1,434 rushing yards, 19 rushing touchdowns, 294 rush attempts and 119.5 rushing yards per game.

McRae led Ohio in rushing each year he was there, starting with his freshman year.

=== Statistics ===
Season	Team	Rushing						Receiving				
Season	Team	GP	Att	Yds	Avg	Lng	TD	Rec	Yds	Avg	Lng	TD
2004	Ohio University	11	142	559	3.9	35	4	13	172	13.2	39	2
2005	Ohio University	11	209	1153	5.5	50	7	13	97	7.5	28	0
~2006	Ohio University	14	258	1252	4.9	66	15	29	280	9.7	58	1
2007	Ohio University	12	294	1434	4.9	65	19	29	275	9.5	49	1
	Total	48	903	4398	4.9	66	45	84	824	9.8	58	4

~includes bowl game
