= 2011 Ohio Bobcats football team =

American college football season

2011 Ohio Bobcats football

MAC East Division champion Famous Idaho Potato Bowl champion

MAC Championship Game, L 20–23 vs. Northern Illinois

Famous Idaho Potato Bowl, W 24–23 vs. Utah State
- Conference: Mid-American Conference
- East
- Record: 10–4 (6–2 MAC)
- Head coach: Frank Solich (7th season)
- Co-offensive coordinators: Tim Albin (7th season); Gerry Gdowski (2nd season)
- Offensive scheme: Spread option
- Defensive coordinator: Jim Burrow (7th season)
- Base defense: 4-3
- Home stadium: Peden Stadium

2011 Mid-American Conference football standings
	Conf.			Overall
Team	W		L	W		L
East Division
Ohio xy	6	–	2	10	–	4
Temple	5	–	3	9	–	4
Kent State	4	–	4	5	–	7
Bowling Green	3	–	5	5	–	7
Miami (OH)	3	–	5	4	–	8
Buffalo	2	–	6	3	–	9
Akron	0	–	8	1	–	11
West Division
Northern Illinois xy$	7	–	1	11	–	3
Toledo x	7	–	1	9	–	4
Western Michigan	5	–	3	7	–	6
Ball State	4	–	4	6	–	6
Eastern Michigan	4	–	4	6	–	6
Central Michigan	2	–	6	3	–	9
Championship: Northern Illinois 23, Ohio 20
$ – Conference champion; x – Division champion/co-champions; y – Championship game participant

The 2011 Ohio Bobcats football team represented Ohio University in the 2011 NCAA Division I FBS football season. The Bobcats were led by seventh-year head coach Frank Solich and played their home games at Peden Stadium. They were a member of the East Division of the Mid-American Conference (MAC). Ohio finished the season 10–4, 6–2 in MAC play to be champions of the East Division. They represented the division in the MAC Championship Game where they lost to Northern Illinois. They were invited to the Famous Idaho Potato Bowl where they defeated Utah State for their first bowl victory in school history.

== Schedule ==
Date	Time	Opponent	Site	TV	Result	Attendance
September 3	8:00 p.m.	at New Mexico State*	Aggie Memorial Stadium; Las Cruces, NM	ALT	W 44–24	14,728
September 10	7:00 p.m.	Gardner–Webb*	Peden Stadium; Athens, OH		W 30–3	23,155
September 17	7:00 p.m.	Marshall*	Peden Stadium; Athens, OH (Battle for the Bell)	ESPN3	W 44–7	24,244
September 24	2:00 p.m.	at Rutgers*	High Point Solutions Stadium; Piscataway, NJ	ESPN3	L 26–38	41,388
October 1	2:00 p.m.	Kent State	Peden Stadium; Athens, OH		W 17–10	17,155
October 8	3:30 p.m.	at Buffalo	University at Buffalo Stadium; Amherst, NY	TWCS	L 37–38	15,057
October 15	3:30 p.m.	Ball State^{†}	Peden Stadium; Athens, OH	STO	L 20–23	23,146
October 22	3:30 p.m.	at Akron	InfoCision Stadium – Summa Field; Akron, OH	STO	W 37–20	14,760
November 2	8:00 p.m.	Temple	Peden Stadium; Athens, OH	ESPN	W 35–31	17,490
November 10	7:30 p.m.	at Central Michigan	Kelly/Shorts Stadium; Mount Pleasant, MI	ESPNU	W 43–28	12,127
November 16	8:00 p.m.	at Bowling Green	Doyt Perry Stadium; Bowling Green, OH	ESPN	W 29–28	11,804
November 22	7:00 p.m.	Miami (OH)	Peden Stadium; Athens, OH (Battle of the Bricks)	ESPN2	W 21–14	14,155
December 2	7:00 p.m.	vs. Northern Illinois	Ford Field; Detroit, MI (MAC Championship Game)	ESPN2	L 20–23	13,052
December 17	5:30 p.m.	vs. Utah State*	Bronco Stadium; Boise, ID (Famous Idaho Potato Bowl)	ESPN	W 24–23	28,076
*Non-conference game; ^{†}Homecoming; All times are in Eastern time
