= Tri-State Collegiate Hockey League =

ACHA ice hockey league

Tri-State Collegiate Hockey League (TSCHL)
- Conference: ACHA
- Founded: 2010
- Commissioner: Tim Driscoll (since 2018)
- Sports fielded: Men's ice hockey
- Division: Division II
- No. of teams: 10
- Headquarters: Columbus, Ohio
- Region: Southeast
- Most recent champion: Ohio (2nd title)
- Most titles: Louisville & Toledo (3)
- Website: Official website

The Tri-State Collegiate Hockey League (TSCHL) is an ACHA Division II level ice hockey league. ACHA Division II level consists of players with previous Jr. A, AAA or Midget Major experience, along with high caliber high school experience. The level can range from varsity high school up to NCAA Division III skills, depending on the programs.

== History ==
The TSCHL was formed in 2010 and consisted of eight teams for its first season. Only Dayton remains in the league from the inaugural season.

A number of the league's current members were part of the now defunct Great Lakes Intercollegiate Hockey Association (GLIHA), while others in the past joined from the College Hockey East and the Midwest Collegiate Hockey League (MCHL). All 11 members currently compete within the ACHA Division II Southeast Region. The league was separated into two divisions, beginning in the 2021–2022 season, for only the second time in its history. Currently, the league is back in a two division format with its current membership being at ten teams.

Indiana won the ACHA Men's Division II National Championship in 2024, becoming the first team from the league to do so.

Former logo of the TSCHL. Used until the conclusion of the 2018–19 season.

=== Past Champions ===
Season	Regular season	Playoff	Runner-up	Score	Location
2010/11	Dayton (1)	Dayton (1)	Pittsburgh	3–2 (OT)	Pittsburgh, PA
2011/12	Dayton (2)	Toledo (1)	Dayton	10–5	Pittsburgh, PA
2012/13	Dayton (3) / Toledo (1)	Toledo (2)	Ohio	4–1	Akron, OH
2013/14	Toledo (2)	Toledo (3)	Ohio	6–2	Pittsburgh, PA
2014/15	Dayton (4)	Louisville (1)	Dayton	7–2	Cincinnati, OH
2015/16	Ohio (1)	Louisville (2)	Ohio	7–5	Athens, OH
2016/17	Cincinnati (1)	Louisville (3)	Cincinnati	6–4	Louisville, KY
2017/18	Miami (1)	Ohio (1)	Miami	3–2 (OT)	Athens, OH
2018/19	Cincinnati (2)	Miami (1)	Cincinnati	4–3 (OT)	Louisville, KY
2019/20	Miami (2)	Ohio State (1)	Miami	4–3	Louisville, KY
2020/21	CANCELED	DUE	TO	–	COVID-19
2021/22	Miami (3)	Indiana (1)	Miami	4–2	Cincinnati, OH
2022/23	Miami (4)	Indiana (2)	Ohio	4–3 (2OT)	Columbus, OH
2023/24	Miami (5)	Miami (2)	Michigan	7–1	Cincinnati, OH
2024/25	Indiana (1)	Kentucky (1)	Ohio	6–2	Athens, OH
2025/26	Ohio State (1)	Ohio (2)	Miami	6–2	Oxford, OH
2026/27	TBD	TBD	TBD	TBD	Carmel, IN

== Format ==
League teams play a 13-game league schedule with 2 games against each division opponent and one game against each cross-division opponent, in addition to non-league games against other ACHA DI, DII & DIII teams. The TSCHL season concludes with an eight-team bracket league tournament at the end of the regular season in mid-late February.

== Current members ==
Division	Institution	Location	Team Nickname	Joined TSCHL	Home arena	Capacity	Team colors	Team Website
East Division	Bowling Green State University	Bowling Green, OH	Falcons	2016	Slater Family Ice Arena	5,000		BGSU Hockey
East Division	Denison University	Granville, OH	Big Red	2025	Lou & Gib Reese Ice Arena			DU Hockey
East Division	Ohio University	Athens, OH	Bobcats	2011	Bird Arena	2,000		Ohio Hockey
East Division	Ohio State University	Columbus, OH	Buckeyes	2016	OSU Ice Rink	1,415		OSU Hockey
East Division	Pennsylvania State University	State College, PA	Nittany Lions	2026	Pegula Ice Arena	6,014		PSU Hockey
West Division	University of Dayton	Dayton, OH	Flyers	2010	Kettering Rec Complex	700		UD Hockey
West Division	Indiana University	Bloomington, IN	Hoosiers	2019	Frank Southern Ice Arena	800		IU Hockey
West Division	University of Louisville	Louisville, KY	Cardinals	2025	Iceland Sports Complex			UofL Hockey
West Division	Miami University	Oxford, OH	RedHawks	2017	Goggin Ice Center	3,642		Miami Hockey
West Division	University of Michigan	Ann Arbor, MI	Wolverines	2021	Yost Ice Arena	5,800		UM Hockey

NOTE: Bowling Green, Miami, Michigan, Ohio State and Penn State have NCAA Division I hockey teams competing in the Central Collegiate Hockey Association, National Collegiate Hockey Conference & the Big Ten Conference. Louisville formed a second team that joined the TSCHL in 2025-2026 with the original member team moving to Division I of the American Collegiate Hockey Association.

== Former members ==
- University of Toledo (2010–2014) moved to ACHA Division I
- West Virginia University (2010–2015) moved to ACHA Division III, joined CHE; currently in ACHA Division II, joined ACCHL
- Indiana University of Pennsylvania (2010–2016) moved to ACHA Division III; joined CHE
- Wright State University (2010–2018) moved to ACHA Division II Independent; folded
- University of Akron (2010–2018) moved to ACHA Division III; joined CHE
- University of Pittsburgh (2010–2019) moved to ACHA Division II Independent; folded
- Xavier University (2017–2024) moved to ACHA Division III; joined ICHC
- University of Cincinnati (2010–2019; 2023-2025) moved to ACHA Division II Independent; moved to ACHA Division I
- University of Kentucky (2020–2025) moved to ACHA Division I; joined ACCHL
- University of Louisville (2014–2025) moved to ACHA Division I; joined ACCHL

== Current season ==
=== 2026/27 season ===
East Division
Team (R)	GP	W	OT/SOW	L	OT/SOL	GF	GA	Pts
Bowling Green Falcons	9	0	0	9	0	4	66	0
Denison Big Red	7	0	0	7	0	17	53	0
Penn State Nittany Lions* (5)	7	7	0	0	0	51	12	21
Ohio Bobcats* (10)	7	5	0	2	0	36	22	15
Ohio State Buckeyes* (8)	7	6	0	0	1	55	16	19

West Division
Team (R)	GP	W	OT/SOW	L	OT/SOL	GF	GA	Pts
Dayton Flyers	9	2	0	6	1	26	55	7
Indiana Hoosiers (9)	5	4	0	1	0	33	14	12
Louisville Cardinals	8	1	0	7	0	25	62	3
Miami Redhawks* (6)	9	7	2	0	0	69	12	25
Michigan Wolverines	6	3	0	3	0	20	24	9

NOTE: The TSCHL uses a 3-point scoring system.

# – Regular season champion
@ – Playoff champion
* – Clinched playoff berth
E – Eliminated from playoffs
( ) – Regional ranking

After games on November 22, 2026.

==== 2027 playoffs ====
Quarterfinals
W1	TBD	-
E4	TBD	-
W3	TBD	-
E2	TBD	-
E1	TBD	-
W4	TBD	-
W2	TBD	-
E3	TBD	-

Semifinals
?	TBD	-
?	TBD	-
?	TBD	-
?	TBD	-

Championship
?	TBD	-
?	TBD	-

== Southeast Regionals ==
Since the 2015–16 season, the conference has awarded the playoff tournament champion the automatic bid to the ACHA Division II Southeast Regional tournament. The tournament is held in late February with the teams ranked #1–16 in the region (including auto-bid teams) competing in a single-elimination format. The four winners earn a berth to the National Tournament.

- 2013: Toledo lost to Virginia Tech.
- 2014: Toledo defeated Virginia Tech; lost to Penn State.
- 2015: Ohio lost to Liberty.
- 2016: #6 Ohio defeated #7 Rowan; lost to #3 Miami / #9 Louisville (BID) defeated #12 Princeton; lost to #4 Penn State in Overtime.
- 2017: #7 Ohio defeated #6 Cincinnati; defeated #3 Toledo / #8 Louisville (BID) lost to #5 Penn State.
- 2018: #11 Ohio (BID) lost to #10 Rider in Overtime / #4 Cincinnati defeated #9 Maryland; lost to #5 Toledo / #6 Miami defeated #7 Rowan; lost to #3 Liberty.
- 2019: #4 Cincinnati defeated #10 Ohio State; defeated #7 Miami / #7 Miami defeated #6 Delaware; lost to #4 Cincinnati / #10 Ohio State defeated #11 Virginia; lost to #4 Cincinnati.
- 2020: #7 Miami defeated #6 Penn State; defeated #5 Rowan / #8 Ohio State lost to #5 Rowan in double Overtime.
- 2021: ACHA did not hold the regional tournament due to the shortened seasons caused by COVID-19.
- 2022: #4 Miami lost to #11 Ohio State / #7 Indiana defeated #14 North Carolina; defeated #6 Penn State; defeated #13 Pennsylvania / #8 Kentucky lost to #13 Pennsylvania / #11 Ohio State defeated #10 Rider; defeated #4 Miami; defeated #9 Cincinnati.
- 2023: #3 Kentucky defeated #13 Pennsylvania; defeated #11 North Carolina / #4 Indiana defeated #12 Louisville; defeated #6 Ohio / #5 Miami lost to #11 North Carolina in Overtime / #6 Ohio defeated #7 Penn State; lost to #4 Indiana / #8 Michigan lost to #13 Pennsylvania / #12 Louisville defeated #9 Rowan; lost to #4 Indiana.
- 2024: #3 Indiana defeated #14 Pennsylvania; defeated #8 NC State / #4 Miami defeated #10 Rider; defeated #5 Kentucky / #5 Kentucky defeated #9 Penn State in Overtime; lost to #4 Miami / #6 Ohio lost to #8 NC State / #11 Louisville lost to #10 Rider.
- 2025: #3 Kentucky defeated #10 Louisville; lost to #9 Indiana / #7 Miami defeated #14 Rider; defeated #6 NC State in Overtime; lost to #8 Ohio / #8 Ohio defeated #13 Cincinnati; defeated #4 Virginia Tech in double Overtime; defeated #7 Miami / #9 Indiana defeated #12 Michigan; defeated #4 Penn State; defeated #3 Kentucky / #10 Louisville defeated #11 North Carolina; lost to #3 Kentucky.
- 2026: #3 Ohio defeated #14 Virginia Tech; lost to #7 Penn State / #5 Ohio State defeated #12 Florida; lost to #4 Florida Atlantic / #6 Indiana lost to #11 Tennessee / #13 Miami lost to #4 Florida Atlantic.

== National Tournament ==
In the 2016–17 season, Ohio became the first team from the conference to advance to the ACHA Division II National Tournament that is held in March. In the 2021–2022 season, the conference sent two teams to the tournament for the first time. At the 2024 ACHA Division II National Tournament, Indiana & Miami became the first two teams from the conference to advance to the National Championship as Indiana won the game in Overtime.

- 2017: Ohio (SE #4) finished 0–3 in Pool A; lost to William Paterson (NE #1) 6–3, Grand Valley State (Central #2) 3–0 & UNLV (West #3) 3–1.
- 2019: Cincinnati (SE #3) finished 3–0 in Pool D; defeated Lindenwood (Central #2) 3–1, Northern Arizona (West #1) 5–4 (OT) & Keene State (NE #4) 6–3; lost in the National Semi-Finals to Florida Gulf Coast (SE #1) 3–2.
- 2020: Miami (SE #4) was to compete in Pool D; playing against Massachusetts (NE #1), Sault College (Central #2) and MSU Denver (West #3); tournament was canceled due to the COVID-19 pandemic.
- 2022: Indiana (SE #3) finished 0–3 in Pool D; lost to Northeastern (NE #2) 7–5, Mary (West #1) 4–1 & Wisconsin (Central #4) 5–2 / Ohio State (SE #4) finished 0–3 in Pool C; lost to Massachusetts (NE #1) 8–1, Dakota College (West #2) 5–3 & Trine (Central #3) 4–3 (OT).
- 2023: Kentucky (SE #3) finished 0–2–1 in Pool C; lost to Saint Thomas (Central #2) 3–0, Mary (West #1) 3–1 & tied Bentley (NE #4) 1–1 / Indiana (SE #4) finished 2–1 in Pool D; defeated Lindenwood (Central #1) 2–1, Montana State (West #2) 6–4 & lost to New Hampshire (NE #3) 5–3; lost in the National Semi-Finals to Iowa (Central #4) 2–1 in double Overtime.
- 2024: Indiana (SE #3) finished 2–1 in Pool B; defeated Weber State (West #2) 4–2, lost to Northeastern (NE #1) 5–2 & defeated Michigan State (Central #4) 7–3; defeated Lindenwood (Central #1) in National Semi-Finals 3–1; defeated Miami (SE #4) in National Championship 5–4 in Overtime / Miami (SE #4) finished 2–1 in Pool A; defeated Montana State (West #1) 3–0, Keene State (NE #2) 7–5 and lost to Concordia Wisconsin (Central #3) 7–6; defeated Florida Gulf Coast (SE #1) in National Semi-Finals 3–2; lost to Indiana (SE #3) in National Championship 5–4 in Overtime.
- 2025: Ohio (SE #3) finished 1–2 in Pool B; lost to Wisconsin (Central #2) 3–1, defeated Montana State (West #1) 2-1 and lost to RPI (Northeast #4) 5-1 / Indiana (SE #4) finished 2–1 in Pool A; defeated Utah (West #2) 8–1, defeated Northeastern (Northeast #3) 6-2 and lost to Lindenwood (Central #1) 4–1.

== Past seasons ==
=== 2011/12 season ===
Tri-State Collegiate Hockey League
Team (R)	GP	W	L	OTL	SOL	GF	GA	Pts
Akron Zips*	16	6	7	0	3	55	70	15
Cincinnati Bearcats E	16	5	10	1	0	54	81	11
Dayton Flyers # (15)	16	13	2	1	0	81	39	27
IUP Crimson Hawks*	16	8	8	0	0	64	67	16
Ohio Bobcats*	16	9	7	0	0	66	52	18
Pittsburgh Panthers * (13)	16	12	3	0	1	69	51	22
Toledo Rockets*@	16	11	5	0	0	96	59	22
West Virginia Mountaineers E	16	5	10	1	0	51	80	11
Wright State Raiders E	16	3	13	0	0	36	69	6

# – Regular season champion
@ – Playoff champion
* – Clinched playoff berth
E – Eliminated from playoffs
( ) – Regional ranking

After games on February 19, 2012.

==== 2012 playoffs ====
Quarterfinals
4	Ohio	7
5	IUP	2
3	Toledo	6
6	Akron	5

Semifinals
1	Dayton	7
4	Ohio	4
2	Pittsburgh	3
3	Toledo	4

Championship
1	Dayton	5
3	Toledo	10

=== 2012/13 season ===
Tri-State Collegiate Hockey League
Team (R)	GP	W	L	OTL	SOL	GF	GA	Pts
Toledo Rockets*#@ (6)	16	14	1	1	0	90	43	29
Dayton Flyers*#	16	14	1	1	0	98	49	29
Pittsburgh Panthers* (14-T)	16	11	5	0	0	72	47	22
Ohio Bobcats*	16	9	4	3	0	78	63	21
Akron Zips* (14-T)	16	9	5	2	0	69	55	20
IUP Crimson Hawks*	16	5	10	1	0	50	74	11
West Virginia Mountaineers E	15	3	10	2	0	47	79	8
Cincinnati Bearcats E	15	4	11	0	0	45	92	8
Wright State Raiders E	16	2	14	0	0	37	82	4

# – Regular season champion
@ – Playoff champion
* – Clinched playoff berth
E – Eliminated from playoffs
( ) – Regional ranking

After games on February 16, 2013.

==== 2013 playoffs ====
Quarterfinals
3	Pittsburgh	1
6	IUP	4
4	Ohio	8
5	Akron	5

Semifinals
1	Toledo	5
6	IUP	2
2	Dayton	6
4	Ohio	7

Championship
1	Toledo	4
4	Ohio	1

=== 2013/14 season ===
Tri-State Collegiate Hockey League
Team (R)	GP	W	L	OTL	SOL	GF	GA	Pts
Toledo Rockets*#@ (7)	16	15	1	0	0	98	35	30
Dayton Flyers*	16	11	5	0	0	77	53	22
Pittsburgh Panthers*	16	5	9	1	1	45	66	12
Ohio Bobcats* (12)	16	14	2	0	0	94	41	28
Akron Zips E	16	3	13	0	0	51	90	6
IUP Crimson Hawks*	15	8	7	0	0	63	68	16
West Virginia Mountaineers E	15	3	11	1	0	39	83	7
Cincinnati Bearcats*	16	7	7	1	1	75	80	16
Wright State Raiders E	16	5	11	0	0	41	67	10

# – Regular season champion
@ – Playoff champion
* – Clinched playoff berth
E – Eliminated from playoffs
( ) – Regional ranking

After games on February 16, 2014.

==== 2014 playoffs ====
Quarterfinals
3	Dayton	2
6	Pittsburgh	5
4	IUP	4
5	Cincinnati	6

Semifinals
1	Toledo	11
6	Pittsburgh	5
2	Ohio	3
5	Cincinnati	0

Championship
1	Toledo	6
2	Ohio	2

=== 2014/15 season ===
Tri-State Collegiate Hockey League
Team (R)	GP	W	L	OTL	SOL	GF	GA	Pts
Dayton Flyers*# (15)	16	15	1	0	0	99	36	30
Louisville Cardinals*@ (12)	15	12	3	0	0	82	28	24
Ohio Bobcats* (7)	16	10	5	0	1	87	39	21
Cincinnati Bearcats*	16	8	8	0	0	58	73	16
Akron Zips*	16	7	9	0	0	51	89	14
Wright State Raiders*	15	6	8	1	0	52	65	13
Pittsburgh Panthers E	16	5	10	1	0	45	69	11
IUP Crimson Hawks E	16	5	10	1	0	53	82	11
West Virginia Mountaineers E	16	3	10	0	3	51	97	9

# – Regular season champion
@ – Playoff champion
* – Clinched playoff berth
E – Eliminated from playoffs
( ) – Regional ranking

After games on March 1, 2015.

==== 2015 playoffs ====
Quarterfinals
4	Cincinnati	3
5	Akron	5
3	Ohio	7
6	Wright State	4

Semifinals
1	Dayton	9
5	Akron	3
2	Louisville	7
3	Ohio	1

Championship
1	Dayton	2
2	Louisville	7

=== 2015/16 season ===
Tri-State Collegiate Hockey League
Team (R)	GP	W	L	OTL	SOL	GF	GA	Pts
Akron Zips*	14	5	9	0	0	42	90	10
Cincinnati Bearcats*	14	5	9	0	0	51	74	10
Dayton Flyers* (13)	14	11	3	0	0	94	35	22
IUP Crimson Hawks E	14	2	12	0	0	25	90	4
Louisville Cardinals*@ (9)	12	10	2	0	0	82	24	20
Ohio Bobcats*# (6)	14	13	1	0	0	92	21	26
Pittsburgh Panthers*	12	4	7	0	1	40	46	9
Wright State Raiders E	14	4	10	0	0	41	87	8

# – Regular season champion
@ – Playoff champion
* – Clinched playoff berth
E – Eliminated from playoffs
( ) – Regional ranking

After games on February 14, 2016.

==== 2016 playoffs ====
Quarterfinals
4	Cincinnati	0
5	Akron	5
3	Dayton	5
6	Pittsburgh	2

Semifinals
1	Ohio	4
5	Akron	1
2	Louisville	5
3	Dayton	3

Championship
1	Ohio	5
2	Louisville	7

=== 2016/17 season ===
Tri-State Collegiate Hockey League
Team (R)	GP	W	L	OTL	SOL	GF	GA	Pts
Akron Zips E	16	1	14	1	0	30	104	3
Bowling Green Falcons* (13)	16	8	6	1	1	68	62	18
Cincinnati Bearcats*# (6)	16	14	1	0	1	117	48	29
Dayton Flyers*	16	7	8	1	0	59	70	15
Louisville Cardinals*@ (8)	16	14	2	0	0	91	39	28
Ohio Bobcats* (7)	16	12	1	1	2	101	44	27
Ohio State Buckeyes* (16)	16	8	7	1	0	58	59	17
Pittsburgh Panthers E	16	5	10	1	0	49	77	11
Wright State Raiders E	16	3	13	0	0	44	114	6

# – Regular season champion
@ – Playoff champion
* – Clinched playoff berth
E – Eliminated from playoffs
( ) – Regional ranking

After games on February 12, 2017.

==== 2017 playoffs ====
Quarterfinals
4	BGSU	2
5	Ohio State	4
3	Ohio	8
6	Dayton	3

Semifinals
1	Cincinnati	4
5	Ohio State	1
2	Louisville	2
3	Ohio	1

Championship
1	Cincinnati	4
2	Louisville	6

=== 2017/18 season ===
Tri-State Collegiate Hockey League
Team (R)	GP	W	OT/SOW	L	OT/SOL	GF	GA	Pts
Akron Zips E	20	3	1	16	0	51	152	11
Bowling Green Falcons E	19	6	1	11	1	53	78	21
Cincinnati Bearcats* (4)	20	16	1	3	0	141	47	50
Dayton Flyers (20) E	20	6	4	9	1	62	66	27
Louisville Cardinals* (14)	20	14	1	4	1	93	64	45
Miami RedHawks*# (6)	20	17	1	2	0	124	31	53
Ohio Bobcats*@ (11)	19	12	0	6	1	99	50	37
Ohio State Buckeyes* (12)	19	10	2	5	2	91	49	36
Pittsburgh Panthers*	20	9	0	8	3	67	73	30
Wright State Raiders E	20	0	0	20	0	33	190	0
Xavier Musketeers E	19	3	1	12	3	62	76	14

NOTE: The TSCHL uses a 3-point scoring system.

# – Regular season champion
@ – Playoff champion
* – Clinched playoff berth
E – Eliminated from playoffs
( ) – Regional ranking

After games on February 14, 2018.

==== 2018 playoffs ====
Quarterfinals
3	Louisville	2
6	Pittsburgh	3 (OT)
4	Ohio	2
5	Ohio State	1

Semifinals
1	Miami (OH)	7
6	Pittsburgh	0
2	Cincinnati	3
4	Ohio	6

Championship
1	Miami (OH)	2
4	Ohio	3 (OT)

=== 2018/19 season ===
Tri-State Collegiate Hockey League
Team (R)	GP	W	L	OTL	SOL	GF	GA	Pts
Bowling Green Falcons*	11	2	0	9	0	24	72	6
Cincinnati Bearcats# (4)	12	10	0	1	1	76	28	31
Dayton Flyers*	12	2	1	8	1	37	64	9
Louisville Cardinals* (12)	12	5	1	5	1	61	57	18
Miami RedHawks@ (7)	12	9	1	2	0	65	38	29
Ohio Bobcats (14) E	11	6	1	4	0	58	38	20
Ohio State Buckeyes* (10)	11	6	1	4	0	57	43	20
Pittsburgh Panthers*	11	4	1	6	0	37	45	14
Xavier Musketeers*	12	2	0	7	3	32	62	9

NOTE: The TSCHL uses a 3-point scoring system.

# – Regular season champion
@ – Playoff champion
* – Clinched playoff berth
E – Eliminated from playoffs
( ) – Regional ranking

After games on February 9, 2019.

==== 2019 playoffs ====
Quarterfinals
S1	Cincinnati	6
S5	Dayton	1
S3	Louisville	6
N2	Pittsburgh	4
S2	Miami (OH)	11
N3	BGSU	1
N1	Ohio State	4
S4	Xavier	3

Semifinals
S1	Cincinnati	10
S3	Louisville	0
S2	Miami (OH)	4
N1	Ohio State	1

Championship
S1	Cincinnati	3
S2	Miami (OH)	4 (OT)

=== 2019/20 season ===
Tri-State Collegiate Hockey League
Team (R)	GP	W	OT/SOW	L	OT/SOL	GF	GA	Pts
Bowling Green Falcons*	14	6	0	8	0	44	59	18
Dayton Flyers*	14	1	0	13	0	31	84	3
Indiana Hoosiers* (13)	14	7	2	5	0	54	51	25
Louisville Cardinals*	14	3	0	11	0	33	62	9
Miami RedHawks# (7)	14	13	0	1	0	88	27	39
Ohio Bobcats* (17)	14	6	0	7	1	54	51	19
Ohio State Buckeyes* (8)	14	10	0	4	0	67	44	30
Xavier Musketeers* (12)	14	8	0	5	1	48	41	25

NOTE: The TSCHL uses a 3-point scoring system.

# – Regular season champion
@ – Playoff champion
* – Clinched playoff berth
E – Eliminated from playoffs
( ) – Regional ranking

After games on February 8, 2020.

==== 2020 playoffs ====
Quarterfinals
1	Miami (OH)	10
8	Dayton	1
4	Xavier	8
5	Ohio	4
3	Indiana	6
6	Bowling Green	2
2	Ohio State	7
7	Louisville	4

Semifinals
1	Miami (OH)	3 (OT)
4	Xavier	2
3	Indiana	1
2	Ohio State	2

Championship
1	Miami (OH)	3
2	Ohio State	4

=== 2021/22 season ===
North Division
Team (R)	GP	W	OT/SOW	L	OT/SOL	GF	GA	Pts
Michigan Wolverines* (16)	13	8	1	4	0	58	38	26
Ohio State Buckeyes* (11)	13	8	0	5	0	58	37	24
Ohio Bobcats* (15)	13	8	0	5	0	71	60	24
Bowling Green Falcons*	13	2	0	11	0	33	71	6
Dayton Flyers E	13	1	0	12	0	26	80	3

South Division
Team (R)	GP	W	OT/SOW	L	OT/SOL	GF	GA	Pts
Miami RedHawks*# (4)	11	11	0	0	0	62	11	33
Indiana Hoosiers*@ (7)	13	9	1	3	0	59	39	29
Kentucky Wildcats* (8)	11	6	0	4	1	69	45	19
Louisville Cardinals* (19)	13	4	3	5	1	50	55	19
Xavier Musketeers E	13	1	0	9	3	32	82	6

NOTE: The TSCHL uses a 3-point scoring system.

# – Regular season champion
@ – Playoff champion
* – Clinched playoff berth
E – Eliminated from playoffs
( ) – Regional ranking

After games on February 13, 2022.

==== 2022 playoffs ====
Quarterfinals
S1	Miami (OH)	3
N4	Bowling Green	0
N2	Ohio State	6
S3	Kentucky	4
N1	Michigan	5
S4	Louisville	0
S2	Indiana	4
N3	Ohio	1

Semifinals
S1	Miami (OH)	4
N2	Ohio State	0
N1	Michigan	2
S2	Indiana	5

Championship
S1	Miami (OH)	2
S2	Indiana	4

All 2022 TSCHL Playoff games broadcast on Indiana Hockey Broadcast Network live from the SportsPlus Center in Cincinnati, Ohio.

=== 2022/23 season ===
North Division
Team (R)	GP	W	OT/SOW	L	OT/SOL	GF	GA	Pts
Ohio Bobcats* (6)	13	7	2	3	1	59	41	26
Michigan Wolverines* (8)	13	7	1	5	0	50	46	23
Ohio State Buckeyes* (16)	13	7	1	5	0	49	36	23
Bowling Green Falcons* (17)	13	5	0	6	2	51	49	17
Dayton Flyers E	13	0	0	11	2	31	92	2

South Division
Team (R)	GP	W	OT/SOW	L	OT/SOL	GF	GA	Pts
Miami RedHawks# (5)	13	11	0	2	0	57	28	33
Kentucky Wildcats* (3)	13	7	2	4	0	64	40	25
Indiana Hoosiers@ (4)	13	8	0	5	0	63	43	24
Louisville Cardinals* (12)	13	6	0	5	2	62	46	20
Xavier Musketeers E	13	0	1	12	0	27	99	2

NOTE: The TSCHL uses a 3-point scoring system.

# – Regular season champion
@ – Playoff champion
* – Clinched playoff berth
E – Eliminated from playoffs
( ) – Regional ranking

After games on February 5, 2023.

==== 2023 playoffs ====
Quarterfinals
S1	Miami	2
N4	Ohio State	3
S3	Indiana	3
N2	Michigan	2
N1	Ohio	6
S4	Louisville	1
S2	Kentucky	8
N3	Bowling Green	4

Semifinals
N4	Ohio State	4
S3	Indiana	5 (OT)
N1	Ohio	3
S2	Kentucky	2

Championship
S3	Indiana	4
N1	Ohio	3 (2OT)

=== 2023/24 season ===
North Division
Team (R)	GP	W	OT/SOW	L	OT/SOL	GF	GA	Pts
Ohio Bobcats* (6)	14	9	0	4	1	53	30	28
Bowling Green Falcons* (18)	14	7	1	6	0	46	55	23
Michigan Wolverines* (14)	14	5	1	7	1	47	50	18
Dayton Flyers* (19)	14	3	2	8	1	53	79	14
Ohio State Buckeyes E (20)	14	4	0	9	1	39	59	13

South Division
Team (R)	GP	W	OT/SOW	L	OT/SOL	GF	GA	Pts
Miami RedHawks*#@ (4)	15	13	0	1	1	75	29	40
Indiana Hoosiers* (3)	15	11	1	3	0	73	39	35
Kentucky Wildcats* (5)	15	10	1	4	0	87	40	32
Louisville Cardinals* (11)	15	6	1	8	0	62	56	20
Cincinnati Bearcats E	15	2	0	10	3	44	81	9
Xavier Musketeers E	15	2	1	12	0	21	82	8

NOTE: The TSCHL uses a 3-point scoring system.

# – Regular season champion
@ – Playoff champion
* – Clinched playoff berth
E – Eliminated from playoffs
( ) – Regional ranking

After games on February 11, 2024.

==== 2024 playoffs ====
Quarterfinals
S1	Miami (OH)	8
N4	Dayton	2
S3	Kentucky	6
N2	Bowling Green	2
N1	Ohio	4
S4	Louisville	0
S2	Indiana	2
N3	Michigan	4

Semifinals
S1	Miami (OH)	4
S3	Kentucky	3
N1	Ohio	3
N3	Michigan	4 (OT)

Championship
S1	Miami (OH)	7
N3	Michigan	1

=== 2024/25 season ===
North Division
Team (R)	GP	W	OT/SOW	L	OT/SOL	GF	GA	Pts
Ohio Bobcats* (8)	13	8	1	4	0	62	33	26
Bowling Green Falcons E	13	1	0	12	0	21	86	3
Michigan Wolverines* (13)	13	5	0	7	1	37	44	16
Dayton Flyers*	13	2	0	10	1	32	81	7
Ohio State Buckeyes* (17)	13	6	1	6	0	57	51	20

South Division
Team (R)	GP	W	OT/SOW	L	OT/SOL	GF	GA	Pts
Miami RedHawks* (7)	13	8	2	3	0	62	41	28
Indiana Hoosiers*# (9)	13	10	0	3	0	70	41	30
Kentucky Wildcats*@ (3)	13	9	0	3	1	61	27	28
Louisville Cardinals* (11)	13	8	0	5	0	57	39	24
Cincinnati Bearcats E (15)	13	4	0	8	1	38	52	13

NOTE: The TSCHL uses a 3-point scoring system.

# – Regular season champion
@ – Playoff champion
* – Clinched playoff berth
E – Eliminated from playoffs
( ) – Regional ranking

After games on February 7, 2025.

==== 2025 playoffs ====
Quarterfinals
S1	Indiana	2
N4	Dayton	4
S3	Kentucky	6
N2	Ohio State	0
N1	Ohio	5
S4	Louisville	4
S2	Miami (OH)	6
N3	Michigan	3

Semifinals
N4	Dayton	0
S3	Kentucky	8
N1	Ohio	4
S2	Miami (OH)	3

Championship
N1	Ohio	2
S3	Kentucky	6

=== 2025/26 season ===
Team (R)	GP	W	OT/SOW	L	OT/SOL	GF	GA	Pts
Bowling Green Falcons	16	2	0	14	0	33	105	6
Dayton Flyers*	16	6	2	7	1	53	63	23
Denison Big Red*	16	4	0	12	0	36	94	12
Indiana Hoosiers* (6)	16	12	1	3	0	95	36	38
Louisville Cardinals	16	0	16	0	0	21	109	0
Miami RedHawks* (13)	16	11	0	4	1	84	44	34
Michigan Wolverines* (18)	16	8	1	7	0	58	50	26
Ohio Bobcats*@ (3)	16	11	0	4	1	88	29	34
Ohio State Buckeyes*# (5)	16	14	0	1	1	99	37	43

NOTE: The TSCHL uses a 3-point scoring system.

# – Regular season champion
@ – Playoff champion
* – Clinched playoff berth
E – Eliminated from playoffs
( ) – Regional ranking

After games on January 31, 2026.

==== 2026 playoffs ====
Play-In Game
8	Bowling Green	7
9	Louisville	2

Quarterfinals
1	Ohio State	8
8	Bowling Green	2
4	Miami	5
5	Michigan	2
3	Ohio	16
6	Dayton	1
2	Indiana	4
7	Denison	1

Semifinals
1	Ohio State	3
4	Miami	7
3	Ohio	3
7	Denison	1

Championship
4	Miami	2
3	Ohio	6

Indiana withdrew from the playoff tournament.

== See also ==
- American Collegiate Hockey Association
- List of ice hockey leagues
