= Convocation Center (Ohio University) =

Arena in Ohio, United States

- The Convo
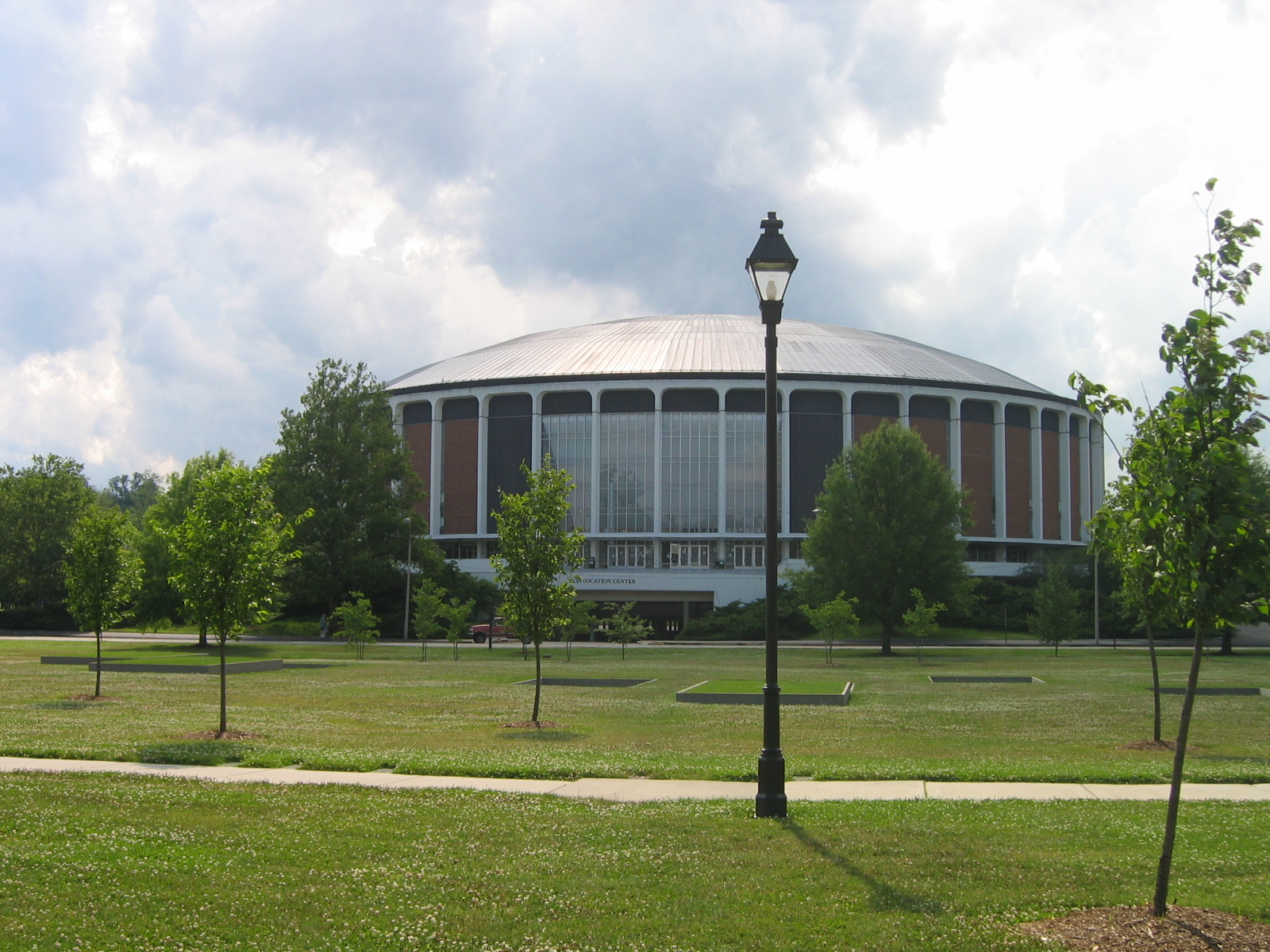
- Interactive map of Convocation Center
- Location: 95 Richland Avenue; Athens, Ohio 45701
- Coordinates: 39°19′23″N 82°6′20″W
- Owner: Ohio University
- Operator: Ohio University
- Capacity: 13,000
- Surface: Two-layer maple wood

Construction
- Groundbreaking: 1965
- Opened: December 3, 1968
- Cost: $8.2 million ($75.9 million in 2025 dollars)
- Architect: Brubaker/Brandt
- Structural engineers: Fling & Eeman, Inc.
- General contractor: Knowlton Construction Company

Tenant
- Ohio Bobcats (NCAA) (1968–present)

The Convocation Center is a 13,000-seat multi-purpose arena that is home to the Ohio Bobcats basketball, volleyball, and wrestling teams.

== History ==
The Convocation Center, also known locally as "The Convo," was designed by architecture firm Brubaker/Brandt of Columbus, Ohio and built by Knowlton Construction Company of Bellefontaine, Ohio. The first men's basketball game in the arena featured an 80–70 Ohio victory over the Indiana Hoosiers on December 3, 1968. The arena houses offices for the Ohio Athletics Department, numerous coaches' offices, team locker rooms, and athletic training rooms. Additionally it houses offices and classrooms for the computer science branch of the Russ College of Engineering. Over the years, there have been numerous renovations, some of the most recent being in 1997, where improved lighting, an expanded press row, and a wider camera deck were added to the arena. Also, The Vern and Marion Alden Basketball Suite which houses offices and meeting rooms for Ohio men's and women's basketball was completed. A few years later, the locker rooms for both basketball teams were expanded and given new furniture, carpeting, and individual wooden lockers. Following the 2004 season, more renovations occurred as a new playing surface was installed and two large Daktronics video boards were added to the venue.

The Convocation Center's atmosphere has helped the Bobcats to win over 75% of their home games since the opening of The Convo in 1968. At the beginning of the 2001–2002 season, a new student cheering section, dubbed the "O Zone," was started for men's basketball games.

The Convocation Center brought in its largest crowd on February 28, 1970, when 14,102 fans were in attendance to watch the Bobcats men's basketball team defeat the Bowling Green Falcons 77–76. That year Ohio finished 20–5, winning the Mid-American Conference title and advancing to the NCAA Tournament.

In addition to Ohio basketball, volleyball, and wrestling contests, the Convo hosts numerous other events annually. The facility has held local high school basketball games as well as high school state tournament games as well as a variety of concerts, including a May 17, 1969 concert by Led Zeppelin, professional wrestling events, and special university events, most notably Ohio University's graduation ceremonies.

The Convocation Center was used for Thursday night rehearsals for The Ohio University Marching 110 when the weather caused temperatures to drop far too low for these late-night sessions. The band used these rehearsals to learn/polish dance routines for their home football games on the basketball court. The building was also used for several of the Marching 110's LP recording sessions in the 1970s, 80s and 90s.

Ohio University Athletics Director Jim Schaus announced plans to renovate the Convocation Center athletic training center by 2012 as part of the Bobcat Renaissance, an initiative geared toward improving OHIO's athletic programs.

== Largest attendance ==
Rank	Date	Attendance	Event
1	February 28, 1970	14,102	Ohio vs. Bowling Green
2	December 30, 1997	13,083	Ohio vs. Kentucky
3	February 15, 1997	13,021	Ohio vs. Miami (OH)
4	January 21, 2012	13,011	Ohio vs. Miami (OH)
5	January 8, 1994	12,824	Ohio vs. Miami (OH)

Source : Ohio History and Records 2013-14

== Gallery ==
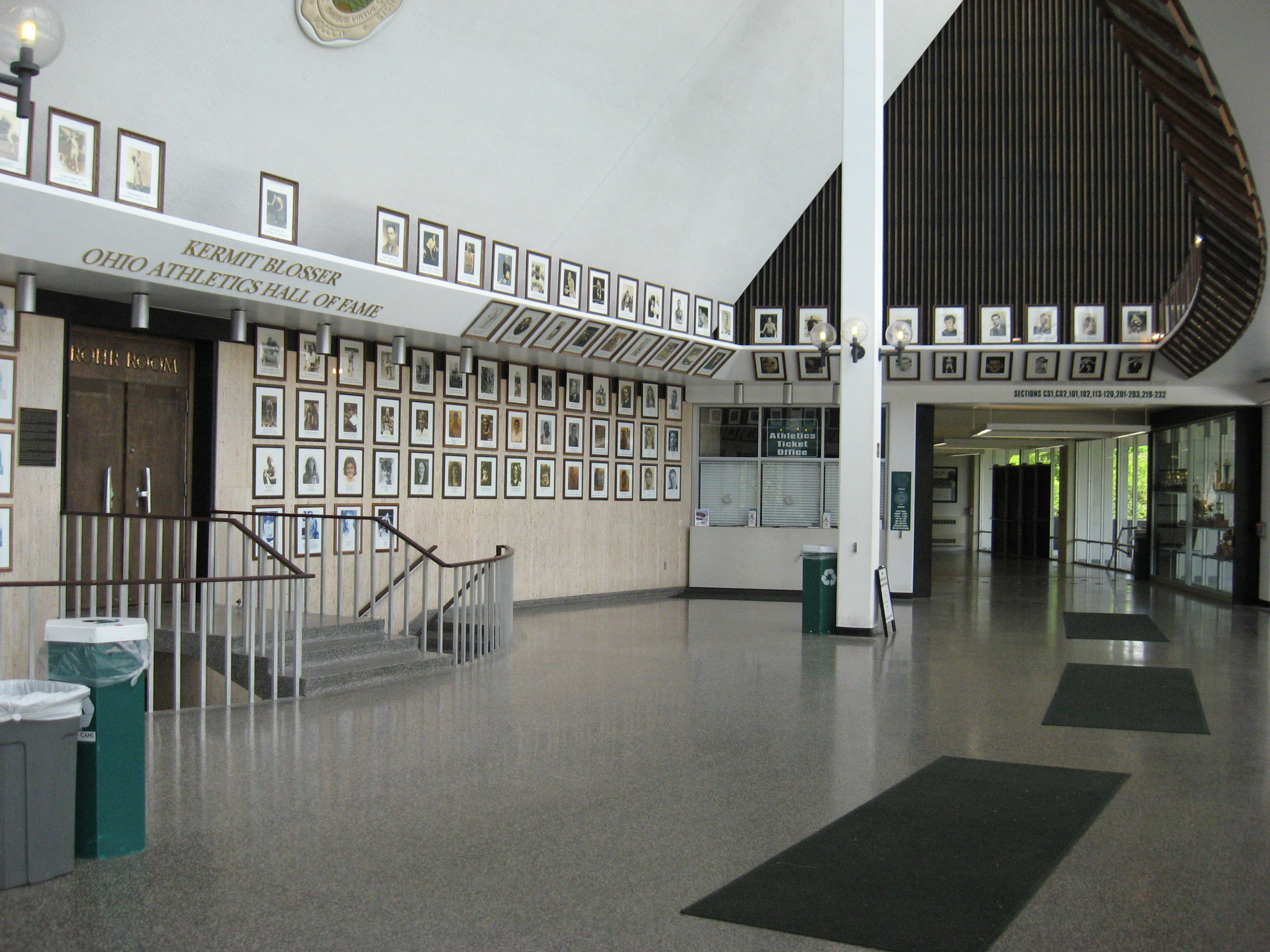
Kermit Blosser Ohio Athletics Hall of Fame within the Convocation Center.

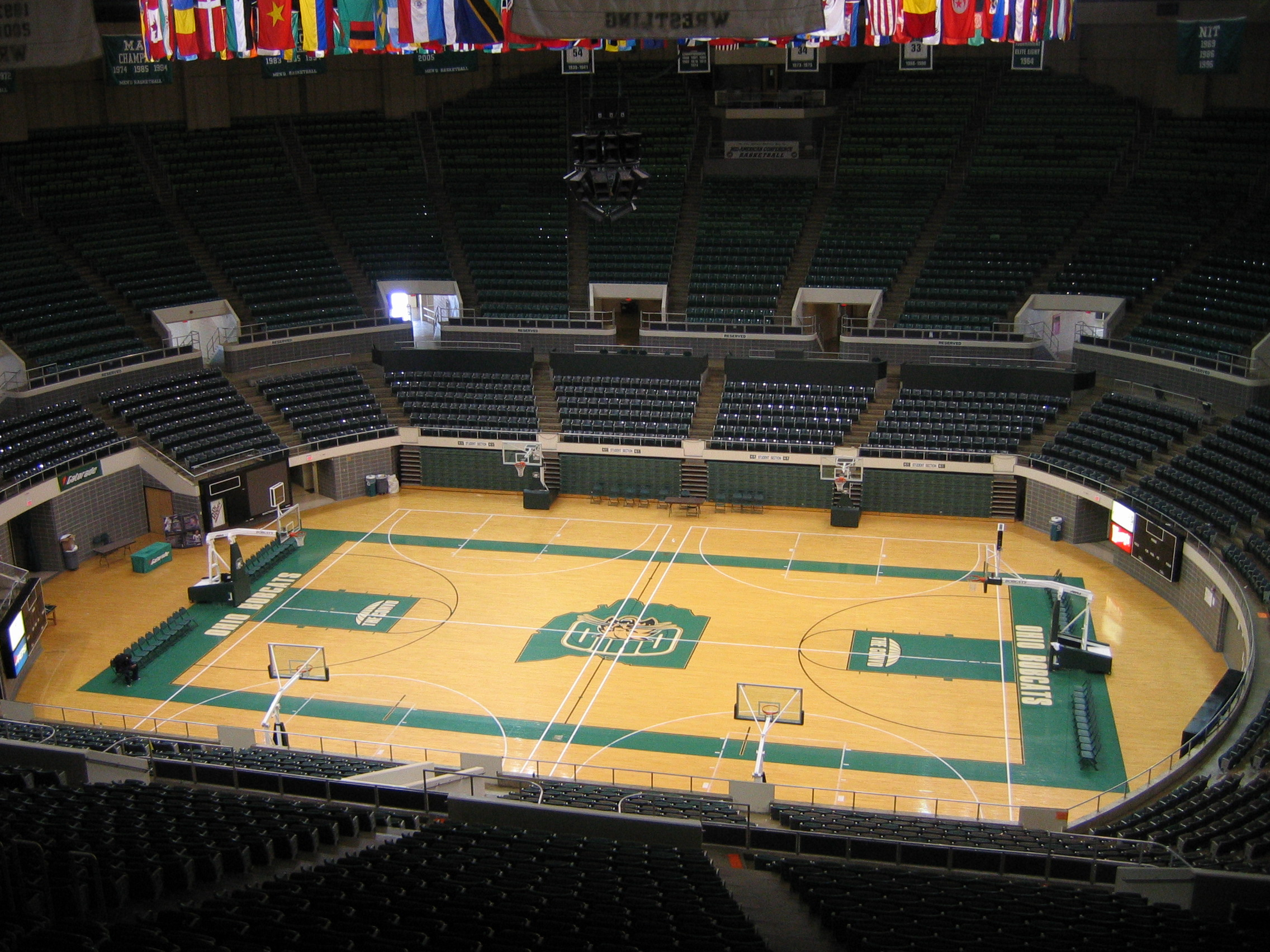
Interior of the Convocation Center in 2008.

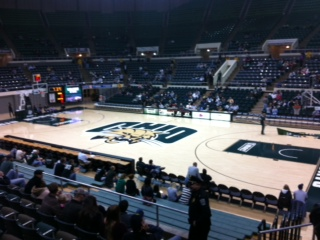
The Convocation Center prior to the men's basketball game against Hampton in 2012.

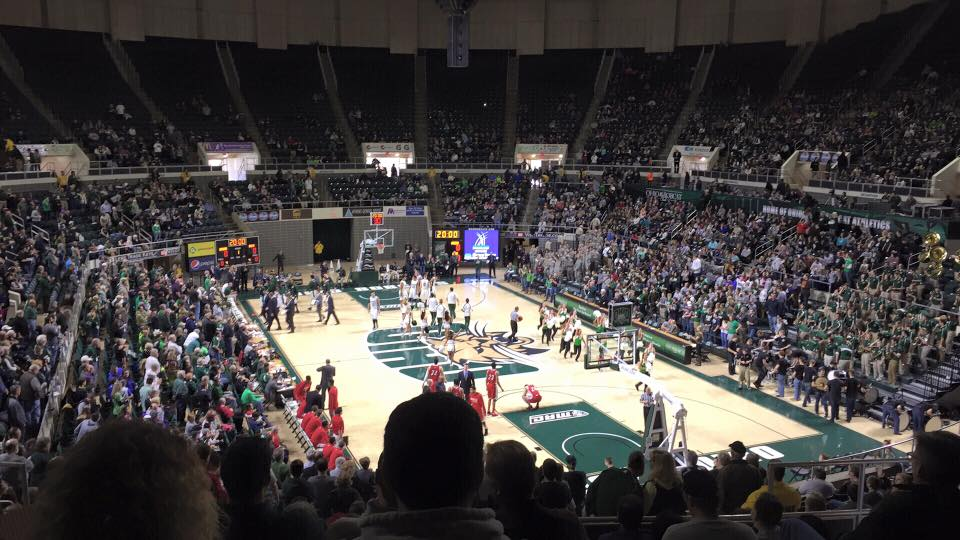
Ohio vs NIU men's basketball game February 6, 2016 at the Convocation Center in Athens, OH

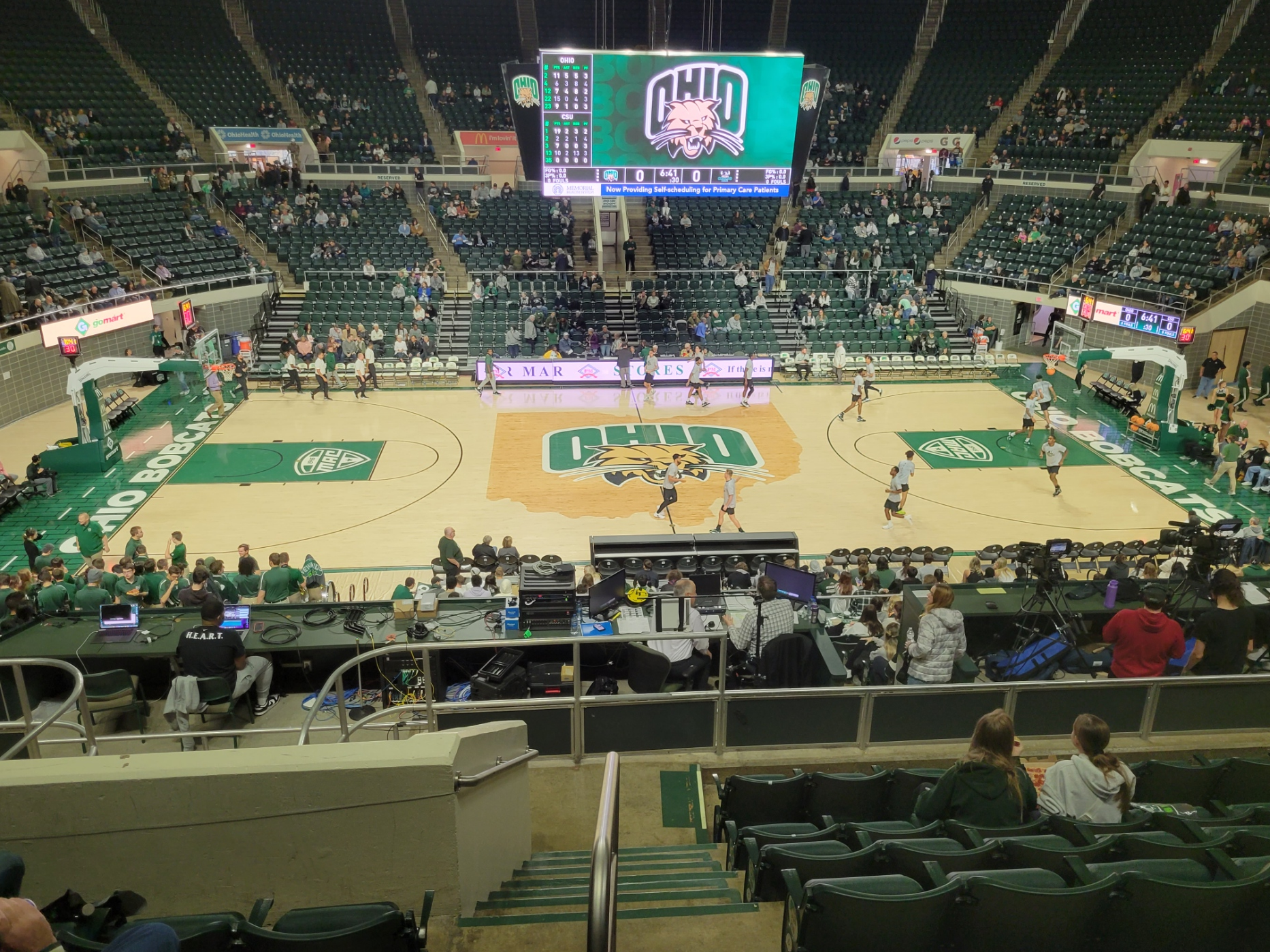
The court as seen in November 2022

== See also ==
- List of NCAA Division I basketball arenas
