= Julie Cromer =

American athletic director

Current position
- Title: Deputy Athletic director
- Team: LSU Tigers
- Conference: Southeastern Conference

Administrative career (AD unless noted)
- 2010-2014: Indiana Hoosiers (assoc. AD)
- 2014-2019: Arkansas Razorbacks (deputy AD)
- 2019-2025: Ohio Bobcats
- 2025-present: LSU Tigers (deputy AD)

Julie Cromer is the deputy athletic director for Louisiana State University in Baton Rouge, Louisiana. Previously, she served as a co-chair of the NCAA Division I Transformation Committee and was the athletic director at Ohio University and interim athletic director at the University of Arkansas. She was the first female athletic director for the Ohio Bobcats.

== Early years ==
Julie Cromer grew up in Southern Missouri. She received her Bachelor's degree from Missouri State University in 1993. She earned a Master's degree in Policy Analysis from the O'Neill School of Public and Environmental Affairs at Indiana University in 2010.

== Career ==
She began her career in athletics working for the Midwestern Collegiate Conference. She later served as Assistant Athletic Director at Wright State University. She left Wright State to begin a ten-year duration at the National Collegiate Athletic Association (NCAA) where she served as Director of Academic and Membership Affairs. She then served as Executive Associate Athletics Director and Senior Woman Administrator (SWA) at Indiana University Bloomington for four years and the Senior Deputy Athletics Director at the University of Arkansas for six years. As interim Athletic Director at Arkansas after Jeff Long was fired, she fired football coach Bret Bielema.

=== Ohio ===
On August 31, 2019, she was hired by Ohio University to become the school's Athletic Director following Jim Schaus, who left to become the Commissioner of the Southern Conference. During her first year, the Ohio Football Team won the Idaho Potato Bowl. The following year the Ohio Men's Basketball Team won the 2020 MAC men's basketball tournament and upset Atlantic Coast Conference (AAC) regular season champion Virginia Cavaliers in the first round of the NCAA tournament. This was the school's first tournament win since a sweet sixteen appearance in 2012.

On July 14, Cromer promoted long time offensive coordinator Tim Albin to head football coach at Ohio following the unexpected retirement of Solich prior to the 2021 season. After struggling to a 3–9 record in 2021, Albin led the Bobcats to a 7–1 mark in the MAC in 2022 as Ohio won the MAC East for the first time since 2016. They lost to Toledo in the MAC Championship Game. Ohio defeated Wyoming in the Arizona Bowl The Bobcat's football team had their 2nd straight 10-win season in 2023. Ohio played Georgia Southern in the Myrtle Beach Bowl where they scored 41 points with the aid of five forced turnovers by the defense to cruise to a 41–21 victory.

In 2024 the football team had a third straight ten-win season. At 7–1 in MAC play they qualified to play Miami in the MAC Championship game Ohio defeated Miami in the MAC Championship game to give the Bobcats their first conference championship since 1968. Tim Albin left the team to accept the head coaching position at Charlotte She named asscociate head coach Brian Smith as the next head coach Ohio then won the 2024 Cure Bowl by as score and Ohio its first ever 11-win season, and extended Ohio's bowl winning streak to six games.

On August 15, 2023, she was named NCAA Division I FBS Nike Executive of the Year. On March 20, 2024, she was named NACDA Athletics Director of the Year by the National Association of Collegiate Directors of Athletics.

On August 8, 2025, it was announced that she was leaving Ohio to accept the position of deputy athletic director at LSU.
