= Ossian C. Bird Arena =

Ice arena of Ohio University in Athens, Ohio

- Bird Arena
- Interactive map of Ossian C. Bird Arena
- Location: Athens, Ohio
- Coordinates: 39°19′26″N 82°06′08″W
- Owner: Ohio University
- Operator: Ohio University
- Capacity: 2,000 (Ice hockey)
- Surface: 190′ × 85′ (Ice hockey)

Construction
- Opened: 1957

Tenant
- Ohio Bobcats Club Men's Ice Hockey

Ossian C. Bird Arena is an ice arena and recreational sport facility located in Athens, Ohio and owned and operated by Ohio University. The arena serves as the home for Ohio University ACHA Men's college ice hockey teams that compete in the American Collegiate Hockey Association at the Division I level as a member of the Central States Collegiate Hockey League and at the Division II level as a member of the Tri-State Collegiate Hockey League. The Division II team won the 2018 TSCHL Tournament Championship. Bird Arena is also home to the Ohio University Synchronized Skating Team who compete in the Open Collegiate division of synchronized skating.

The Bird Arena features a 190′ × 85′ ice sheet for ice hockey, figure skating and open skating, and local high school hockey.

== History ==
Bird Arena is named in honor of Ossian Clinton Bird. Bird began at OU as the freshman football coach at Ohio University from 1917 to 1920; he also taught physical education. Over his years at OU Bird's positions included director of physical education and director of Intercollegiate Athletics.

The Arena was constructed in 1957 and was named in honor of Mr. O.C. Bird in 1960.

The Arena underwent major renovations from 2000 to 2001 that added a seamless Crystaplex dasher board system, four new locker rooms, insulation upgrades, new bleachers, thermal windows, enlarged concession stand, and pro shop. The arena has a 2000-seat seating capacity.
