= Ohio Softball Field =

College softball venue in Athens, Ohio

Coordinates: 39.323922°N 82.10765°W

- The "OSF"
- Interactive map of Ohio Softball Field
- Former names: None
- Location: Athens, Ohio
- Owner: Ohio University
- Operator: Ohio University
- Capacity: 500
- Surface: Natural Grass
- Field size: Left Field – 200 ft. Center Field – 220 ft. Right Field – 200 ft.

Construction
- Groundbreaking: 1998
- Opened: April 2, 1999
- Cost: $200,000 US$
- Architect: various

Tenant
- Ohio Bobcats Softball (NCAA) (1998 – present)

The Ohio Softball Field (the "OSF") is the softball field of the Ohio Bobcats. It has been home to Ohio Bobcats softball since it was opened on April 2, 1999. On that day, Ohio swept a doubleheader (6–5, 6–4) from Miami University in front of a crowd of 436 fans. Ohio won its first seven games at the facility before suffering a 9–2 loss to Kent State University on April 9. The OSF all-time attendance record was set on April 10, 2011, as Ohio downed the Akron Zips before a standing-room only crowd of 573. Ohio ended its 2018 season with a 11–0 record which granted its way to the Tournament Championship and in a MAC Regular Season.

The OSF features a variety of amenities for Ohio's softball players. There are bullpens behind both the home and visitor dugouts and a covered batting cage between the baseball and softball fields. In addition, the stadium has a state-of-the-art playing surface/drainage system that prevents water from collecting on the field.

In 2003, a new Daktronics digital scoreboard was installed at the facility. Many more renovations are being planned for the near future, including a press box, a high-quality sound system, permanent bleachers, and lights to allow night games to be played. When renovations are completed, the stadium will look similar to Ohio's baseball field, Bob Wren Stadium.

In the beginning of 2017, new renovations were installed to the stadium which includes, a new raised press box and new bleachers. By the end of the season in 2017 a new brick wall facade was built behind the facility along with an Attack Cat logo on the back of the new press box.

Ohio Softball Field ADA Information

The information above about the Ohio Softball Field ADA Information Included parking, seating, its animal policy, restrooms, and facility entrance.

Ohio Softball Field Prohibited Items

Some of the Ohio Softball Field Prohibited Items included alcohol, laser pointers, animals (only if ADA approved), weapons (Including blades/knives of length and kind, and pepper spray), aerosol can.
