= Ohio University Aquatic Center =

Indoor swimming facility in Athens, Ohio

- Home of the Bobcats
- Interactive map of Ohio University Aquatic Center
- Location: Athens, Ohio
- Coordinates: 39°19′24″N 82°06′08″W
- Owner: Ohio University
- Operator: Ohio University
- Capacity: 1,105
- Field size: Olympic-sized pool (22 25-yard lanes, 10 50-meter lanes)

Construction
- Groundbreaking: 1982
- Opened: January 27, 1984
- Closed: Open
- Cost: $4.7 millionUSD
- Architect: Dan A. Carmichael

Tenants
- Ohio Bobcats Women's Swimming and Diving (NCAA) (1984-Present)

The Ohio University Aquatic Center is the swimming and diving facility of the Ohio Bobcats. It has been home to Bobcats swimming and diving since it was opened on January 27, 1984 before a dual meet against the Youngstown State Penguins.

The Aquatic Center has a potential to hold 1,105 spectators in the bleachers located above two sides of the pool. The Olympic-sized pool at the Aquatic Center has 22 25-yard lanes, 10 50-meter lanes and a pair of one and three meter diving boards. The pool's shallow end is 3 feet 6 inches (1.07 m) deep and the pool's deep end is 14 feet 2 inches (4.32 m) deep. The pool has a surface area of 12,300 square feet (1,140 m^{2}) and contains approximately 645,470 US gallons (2,443,400 L) of water.

Because it is one of the best swimming and diving facilities in the region, the Aquatic Center has hosted the 1985 NCAA Diving Regionals, 6 Women's Mid-American Conference Swimming and Diving Championships (1986, 1989, 1992, 1996, 2000 and 2005), and 4 Men's Mid-American Conference Swimming and Diving Championships (1988, 1991, 1998 and 2002). The Ohio High School Athletic Association also holds regional-level competition here often.

In addition to serving as the home of the Bobcats, the facility hosts various local high school swim meets and is used by Ohio University faculty, staff, and students as well as Athens, Ohio community members for recreational swimming.
