= Pruitt Field =

Ohio University field hockey field

Coordinates: 39°19′32″N 82°6′36″W

- Home of the Bobcats
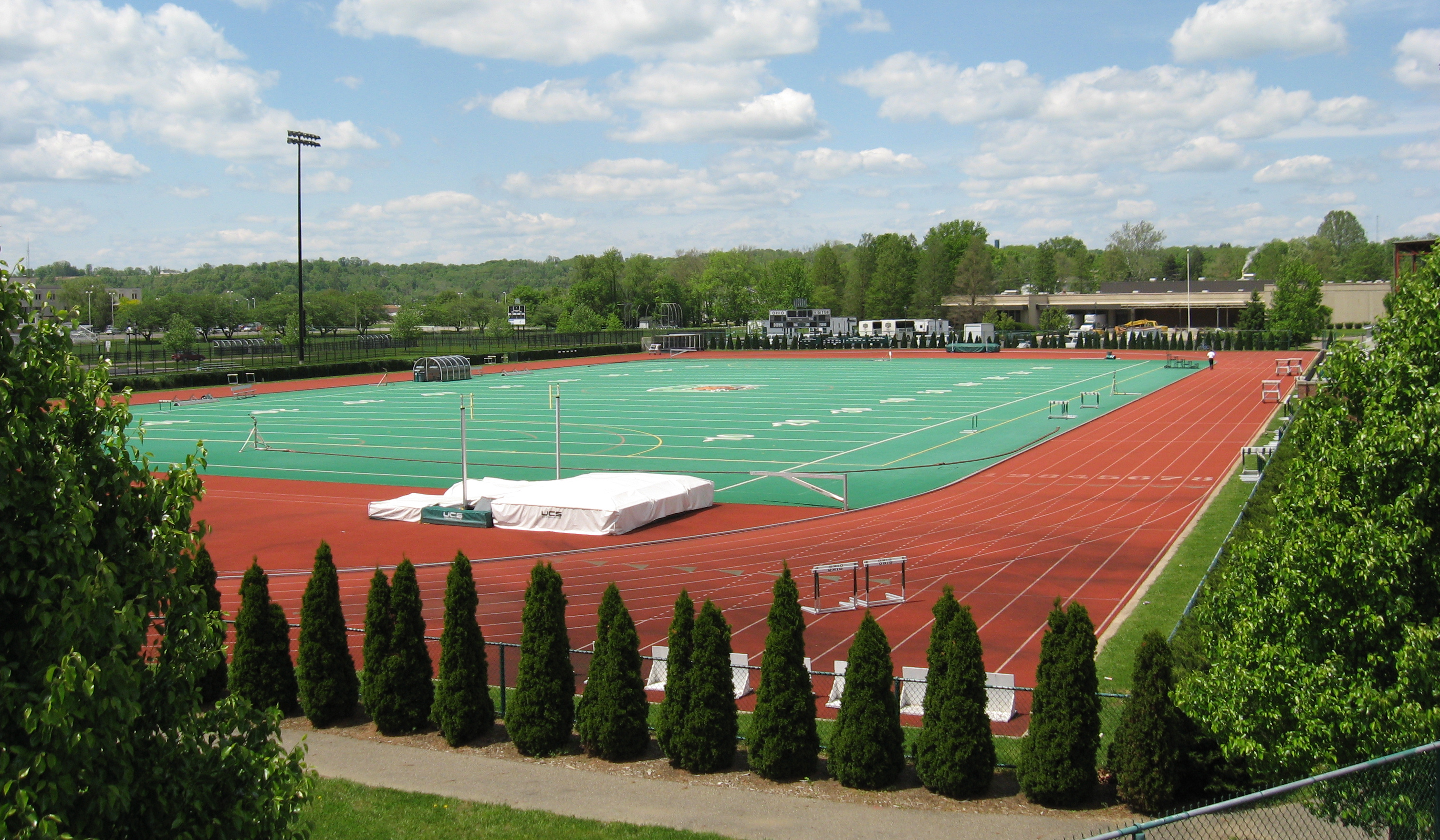
- Interactive map of Pruitt Field
- Location: Athens, Ohio
- Owner: Ohio University
- Operator: Ohio University
- Capacity: 1,000
- Surface: Astroturf 2000
- Field size: 110 by 60 yd (101 by 55 m)

Construction
- Groundbreaking: 1999
- Opened: May 2000
- Cost: US$2.3 million

Tenants
- Ohio Bobcats Women's Field Hockey (NCAA) (2000-Present); Ohio University Marching 110 - Practice Field (2006-Present); Ohio Bobcats Women's Lacrosse (NCAA) (1999 to 2007 when dropped)

Pruitt Field is a field hockey field located in Athens, Ohio on the campus of Ohio University. It serves as the home of the Ohio Bobcats women's field hockey program and opened in 2000. Pruitt Field is surrounded by Goldsberry Track and acts as the infield for track events.

Pruitt Field has a potential to hold 1,000 spectators in the red-brick grandstand located on the east side of the stadium. There is also a press box on the stadium's east side and a high quality sound system. The playing surface at Pruitt Field is made of Astroturf 2000 and features a state-of-the-art drainage system below the field. In the summer of 2006, permanent lights were installed.

The field is named after Peggy Pruitt who served as Ohio's head field hockey coach from 1975-1977 and Ohio's head tennis coach from 1975–1982. She then became Ohio's Associate Director of Athletics from 1993 until retiring in 2001. Today, she is the commissioner of the American Lacrosse Conference.

In addition, the venue serves as the practice field for OU's marching band, The Ohio University Marching 110.
