= Goldsberry Track =

Sports venue in Athens, Ohio

Coordinates: 39°19′33″N 82°6′37″W

- Home of the Bobcats
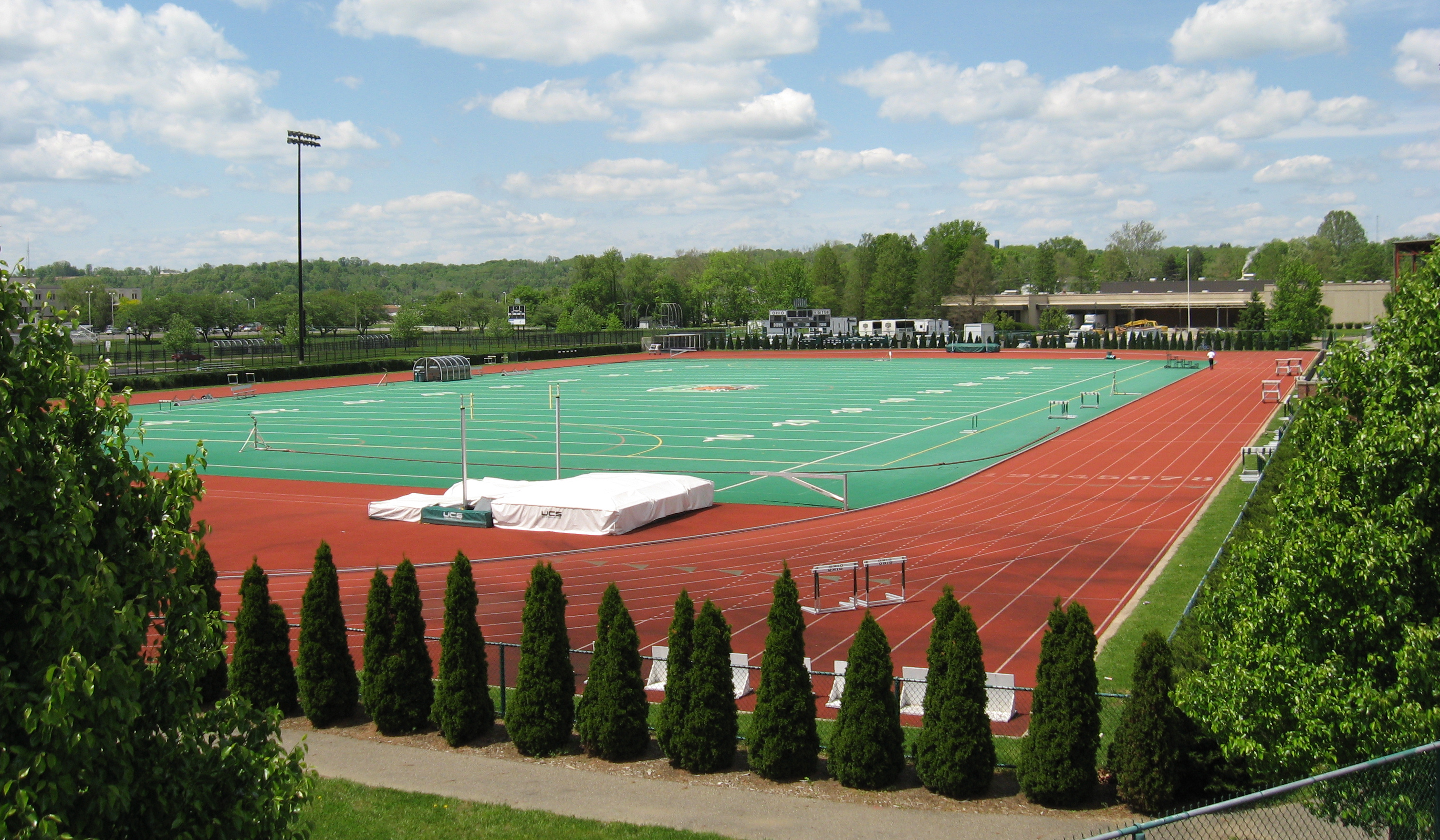
- Interactive map of Goldsberry Track
- Former names: None
- Location: Athens, Ohio
- Owner: Ohio University
- Operator: Ohio University
- Capacity: 1,000
- Surface: Rekortan
- Field size: 110 yards by 60 yards

Construction
- Groundbreaking: 1999
- Opened: May 2000
- Closed: Open
- Demolished: N/A
- Cost: $2.3 million USD
- Architect: various

Tenant
- Ohio Bobcats Women's Track and Field (NCAA) (2000-Present)

Goldsberry Track is the home of the Ohio Bobcats women's track and field team. It has been home to the program since the facility opened in May 2000.

Goldsberry Track has the potential to hold 1,000 spectators in the red-brick grandstand located on the east side of the stadium. There is also a spacious press box on the stadium's east side and a high-quality sound system installed at the stadium. The track at the facility is covered by Rekortan, a mixture of rubber granules with a liquid fixative on top of asphalt. The track surrounds Pruitt Field, an artificial turf field used by the Bobcats' women's field hockey squad, and the Ohio University Marching 110. In the summer of 2006, professional quality lights were installed at Goldsberry Track.

A variety of events are held at Goldsberry Track every year. The Ohio Bobcats track and field teams annually host the McDonald’s Invitational and the Ohio Open for both men's and women's teams. In 2005, Goldsberry Track hosted the Mid-American Conference Track and Field Championships.

Goldsberry Track is named in honor of Blaine R. Goldsberry, an Ohio student-athlete (1911-1914), team physician (1921-1953), and athletic contributor, Goldsberry graduated from Ohio University in 1914 and was a lifelong supporter of Bobcats athletics.
