= Louisville Cardinals ice hockey =

- University: University of Louisville
- Conference: TSCHL
- Head coach: Brian Graham
- Captain(s): Yannis Soukas
- Alternate captain(s): Louie Abounader
- Arena: Iceland Sports Complex; Louisville, Kentucky
- Colors: Red and black

Conference tournament champions
- 2015, 2016, 2017

The Louisville Cardinals Men's Ice Hockey team is an American Collegiate Hockey Association (ACHA) Division 2 college ice hockey program that represents the University of Louisville. The Cardinals are a member of the Tri-State Collegiate Hockey League. They play at Iceland Sports Complex, located in Louisville, Kentucky.

== Current roster ==
As of April 1, 2024.

No.	Nat.	Player	Class	Pos	Height	Weight	DoB	Hometown	Previous team	NHL rights
2		Jonathan Patch	Freshman	F	5' 10" (1.78 m)	175 lb (79 kg)	2003-08-21	North Reading, Massachusetts	Northern Cyclones (USPHL Elite)	—
3		Brenden Hilinski	Sophomore	D	6' 3" (1.91 m)	195 lb (88 kg)	2004-08-01	Wallingford, Connecticut	Sheehan (CT-HS)	—
4		Dalton Karl	Junior	F	5' 11" (1.8 m)	195 lb (88 kg)	2000-05-07	Doylestown, Pennsylvania	New England Wolves (EHL)	—
5		Nick Beeman	Sophomore	D	5' 5" (1.65 m)	155 lb (70 kg)	2001-06-18	Traverse City, Michigan	New England Wolves (EHL)	—
6		Zack Selinger	Senior	D	6' 0" (1.83 m)	185 lb (84 kg)	1999-03-11	Soldonta, Alaska	Worcester Jr. Railers (EHL)	—
7		Tiago Ramirez	Senior	F	5' 9" (1.75 m)	190 lb (86 kg)	2000-06-26	Findlay, Ohio	Motor City HC (USPHL Premier)	—
8		Karl Dreux	Senior	D	6' 5" (1.96 m)	215 lb (98 kg)	1999-07-27	Hudson, Colorado	Connecticut RoughRiders (EHL)	—
9		Jake Zima	Sophomore	F	5' 11" (1.8 m)	165 lb (75 kg)	2004-03-26	Wheaton, Illinois	Wheaton West (IL-HS)	—
10		Niko Anestis	Sophomore	F	5' 11" (1.8 m)	205 lb (93 kg)	2003-01-24	Acton, Massachusetts	Boston Jr. Bruins (USPHL Elite)	—
11		Parker Gee	Senior	F	5' 10" (1.78 m)	180 lb (82 kg)	1998-05-29	Crystal, Michigan	Windsor Aces (GMHL)	—
12		Zach Burkhart	Senior	F	5' 9" (1.75 m)	165 lb (75 kg)	1998-05-12	Frisco, Texas	Skylands Kings (NA3HL)	—
13		Sam Zaritsky	Senior	D	5' 10" (1.78 m)	190 lb (86 kg)	1999-01-01	Westport, Connecticut	Connecticut RoughRiders (EHL)	—
14		Patrick Williams	Senior	D	5' 10" (1.78 m)	185 lb (84 kg)	2000-01-30	Queensbury, New York	Vermont Lumberjacks (EHL Premier)	—
15		Holt Schwarm	Senior	F	6' 0" (1.83 m)	180 lb (82 kg)	2000-12-31	Columbus, Ohio	New England Wolves (EHL Premier)	—
16		Cam Costa	Senior	F	5' 9" (1.75 m)	160 lb (73 kg)	2002-03-16	Burlington, Massachusetts	Burlington (MA-HS)	—
17		Jake Shreders	Junior	F	5' 8" (1.73 m)	165 lb (75 kg)	2003-09-25	Greenwich, Connecticut	Greenwich (CT-HS)	—
18		Jonathan Cohen	Sophomore	F	6' 6" (1.98 m)	205 lb (93 kg)	2001-07-30	Fairfield, Connecticut	Connecticut RoughRiders (EHL)	—
19		Dylan Torres	Junior	F	5' 8" (1.73 m)	175 lb (79 kg)	2003-07-24	Hingham, Massachusetts	South Shore Kings (18U AAA)	—
21		Matt Duncan	Senior	F	6' 0" (1.83 m)	180 lb (82 kg)	2001-06-28	Winnipeg, Manitoba	East Texas Baptist (ACHA D2)	—
22		Jack Bowers	Sophomore	D	6' 0" (1.83 m)	180 lb (82 kg)	2002-11-09	Bethesda, Maryland	Worcester Jr. Railers (EHL Premier)	—
23		Ty Morgan	Senior	F	5' 11" (1.8 m)	185 lb (84 kg)	1999-05-24	Warwick, Rhode Island	Worcester Jr. Railers (EHL)	—
24		Gage Houser	Senior	F	5' 10" (1.78 m)	165 lb (75 kg)	2002-03-23	Benton, Kentucky	Nashville Flyers (18U AA)	—
26		Jeremy Abreu	Sophomore	D	6' 4" (1.93 m)	200 lb (91 kg)	2001-12-07	Gloucester, Massachusetts	Worcester Jr. Railers (EHL Premier)	—
27		Cooper O'Neil	Junior	F	6' 2" (1.88 m)	202 lb (92 kg)	2002-03-01	Centerville, Massachusetts	Barnstable (MA-HS)	—
28		Kevin Millea	Senior	D	5' 10" (1.78 m)	180 lb (82 kg)	2001-02-25	North Haven, Connecticut	Notre Dame - West Haven (CT-HS)	—
29		Ethan McDonough	Freshman	F	5' 9" (1.75 m)	190 lb (86 kg)	2002-10-20	Walpole, Massachusetts	Team Maryland (EHL)	—

=== Head coach Brian Graham ===
Brian Graham is the head coach of the University of Louisville ice hockey program. Graham is entering his eighth season with the program. The team won the Tri-State Collegiate Hockey League championship in three of the last four years and has maintained a high ranking in the Southeast. Graham and the coaching staff are preparing for the 2018–19 season with a group of incoming players.

Coach Graham is originally from Connecticut, and began playing hockey at the age of five with the Wallingford Hawks Youth Hockey Organization. He then played throughout his high school years for the Sheehan Titans in Wallingford, CT, where he was a four-year letterman. He led his team as captain for two years, after earning great respect from both his peers and his coaches. Coach Graham then continued his ice hockey career at the University of Kentucky while majoring in, and receiving his degree in Kinesiology with a minor in Business. Following his graduation from the University of Kentucky, Coach Graham went on to become the head coach at his alma mater, U of K, for two years. He coached them through two winning seasons, before moving back to Connecticut. While in CT, Coach Graham coached both at the high school level and the midget AAA level.

Coach Graham currently lives in Louisville with his wife, Barbara, and two children Colin, 12 and Ashley, 10. He is excited to continue coaching with the University of Louisville and making a deep run in the National Tournament for 2018-19 Season.

== See also ==
- Louisville Cardinals
- Tri-State Collegiate Hockey League
