= Jim Schaus =

American sports administrator

Administrative career (AD unless noted)
- 1999–2008: Wichita State
- 2008–2019: Ohio
- 2019–2023: Southern Conference (Commissioner)

James Schaus is a retired sports administrator who most recently served as commissioner of the Southern Conference (SoCon). Before taking the SoCon position, he served as athletic director at Ohio University in Athens, Ohio and Wichita State University in Wichita, Kansas.

== Early years ==
Jim Schaus is originally from Morgantown, West Virginia. In his later youth, after sixth grade, he grew up in West Lafayette, Indiana where he received his Bachelor's degree from Purdue University in 1983. He earned a Master's degree in athletics administration from West Virginia University where he was named a distinguished alumnus.

== Career ==
Prior to his long career in administrating college athletics Schaus worked in the NFL where he was first an intern with the New England Patriots and later as the director of marketing for the Washington Redskins. He also worked for the LPGA Tour as publicity assistant. Before receiving an athletic director position he worked in the athletic departments at the University of Oregon, the University of Cincinnati, the University of Texas at El Paso and Northern Illinois University.

=== Wichita State ===
Schaus was athletic director for Wichita State from 1999 to 2008 during which he hired Gregg Marshall as the men's basketball coach. Marshall would later lead the Shockers to the 2013 NCAA Final Four and a #1 seed in the 2014 NCAA tournament. He was awarded the Division I Central Region AstroTurf AD of the Year in 2007. During the 2007 season the Shockers won Missouri Valley Conference titles in women's cross country, and women's indoor and outdoor track and field, women's tennis and baseball.

His coaching hires included Chris Lamb as volleyball coach, Tom McCurdy as women's golf coach, Steve Rainbolt as track and field coach, Mark Turgeon and Gregg Marshall for men's basketball, Jody Adams for women's basketball, and Tim Walton for softball. All of these hires guided Wichita State to NCAA tournaments.

=== Ohio ===
From 2008 to 2019 he was the athletic director at Ohio. Under the leadership of Schaus and Head coach Frank Solich the Ohio football program was bowl eligible every season during his tenure. Ohio played in 10 bowl games and won the 2011 Famous Idaho Potato Bowl, the 2012 Independence Bowl, the 2017 Bahamas Bowl, and the 2018 Frisco Bowl. Ohio won the MAC East division title in 2009, 2011, and 2016 but failed to win the MAC Championship Game each time.

Ohio's 2010 men's basketball team defeated 12th ranked Georgetown in the first round of 2010 NCAA tournament. In 2012 they won the MAC tournament and made the sweet sixteen in the NCAA tournament while defeating Big Ten regular season co-champion Michigan in the first round and South Florida in the second round. Ohio finished 2012 ranked #25 in the Coaches Poll.

Schaus hired Bob Boldon as the head coach of the women's basketball team in 2013. Under Boldon Ohio had one of the best stretches of success in program history. Ohio had winning seasons each of the final six years of Schaus' tenure at Ohio. They won the MAC East in 2015, 2016, and 2019. Ohio won the 2015 MAC tournament and qualified for the NCAA tournament. In 2019 Ohio won a school record 30 games.

Ohio's volleyball team won seven MAC Championships while Schaus was AD and appeared in five NCAA Regionals. The baseball and softball teams each won two MAC Championships. Ohio's graduation rate for athletes during his tenure was 88%. Schaus inherited a $2.3 million budget deficit upon arriving at Ohio but balanced the budget during every year of his tenure.

In 2015 he began a term as one of the 10 members on the selection committee for the NCAA Division I men's basketball tournament. In January 2017 the NCAA began looking to replace the Rating percentage index as the rating system used as the primary team sorting tool by the selection committee. Schaus and Dan Gavitt, the NCAA's senior vice president of basketball, met with Jeff Sagarin, Kevin Pauga (KPI), Ken Pomeroy, and Ben Alamar (ESPN BPI) to begin the process of considering a new alternative. The eventual result was the NET Rankings.

=== Southern Conference ===
On July 1, 2019, Schaus was hired as Commissioner of the Southern Conference. Southern Conference Basketball has performed at its highest level in decades both in terms of the quality of top teams and conference depth. Schaus implemented a new scheduling model to enhance the chances of success for Southern Conference programs. In 2019 the Southern Conference finished 10th in the NET rankings. Wofford finished the season ranked #19 and defeated Seton Hall in the first round of the NCAA tournament. UNC Greensboro and Furman both qualified for the NIT

During the COVID-19 pandemic he announced that 2020 Spring Conference sports were cancelled and before the 2020-21 FCS Football Season, like most FCS conferences, the Southern Conference would play in the spring. The Southern Conference was the only FCS conference to have all teams compete during that season.

In February 2023, Schaus announced his retirement effective June 30. Michael Cross, a veteran college sports administrator who had most recently served with the Knight Commission on Intercollegiate Athletics, was named as his successor.

== Personal life ==
He is the son of former Los Angeles Lakers, Purdue and West Virginia head coach Fred Schaus. He and his wife Priscilla have three adult children.
