= Ohio Bobcats =

College sport team in Ohio

- University: Ohio University
- Nickname: Bobcats
- NCAA: Division I (FBS)
- Conference: Mid-American
- Athletic director: Slade Larscheid
- Location: Athens, Ohio
- Varsity teams: 16
- Football stadium: Peden Stadium
- Basketball arena: Convocation Center
- Colors: Hunter green and white
- Mascot: Rufus the Bobcat
- Fight song: "Stand Up and Cheer"
- Website: ohiobobcats.com/index.aspx

The Ohio Bobcats are the National Collegiate Athletic Association (NCAA) Division I Intercollegiate athletic teams that represent Ohio University, located in Athens, Ohio, United States. Ohio University is a charter member (1946) of the Mid-American Conference (MAC), is currently in the East Division of that conference, and sponsors teams in six men's and ten women's NCAA sanctioned sports. The football team competes in the Football Bowl Subdivision (FBS), the highest level for college football.

The Bobcats' main rivals are the Miami RedHawks of Miami University, whose rivalry is known as the Battle of the Bricks. The two universities are the oldest in the state. Ohio also has a rivalry with the Marshall Thundering Herd of Marshall University, located about 80 miles (130 km) from each other, who compete in the Battle for the Bell.

== Teams ==
Men's sports	Women's sports
Baseball	Softball
Basketball	Basketball
Cross country	Cross country
Football	Field hockey
Golf	Golf
Wrestling	Soccer
	Swimming & diving
	Track and field^{1}
	Volleyball
^{1} – includes both indoor and outdoor.

=== Baseball and Softball ===
Ohio's baseball and fastpitch softball teams have storied programs. (Note: Ohio University 1804–2004: Spirit of a Singular Place. Betty Hollow. 2004.) In 1892, the Ohio University baseball team became the first sports team sponsored at the school, and was followed by the football team in 1894.

==== Baseball ====
Ohio is a member of the Mid-American Conference

The Ohio baseball program has won 14 MAC regular season titles in 1947, 1948, 1953, 1954, 1956, 1960, 1964, 1965, 1968, 1968, 1969, 1970, 1971, and 1991. The team has also won MAC tournament titles in 1997 and 2015, and has made a College World Series appearance in 1970. There have been a total of 23 Bobcats in the major leagues, and hundreds more in the minors. Most notably, hall of famer Mike Schmidt was a Bobcat, selected 30th in the 1971 Major League Baseball draft by the Philadelphia Phillies following his senior season. Craig Moore is the current head coach for the baseball team; he is the 10th overall and was an assistant coach for the past eight years before becoming the interim head coach in 2020.

==== Fastpitch softball ====
Although softball at Ohio University began earlier than the 1970s, records were not well kept. Upon the creation of the Association of Intercollegiate Athletics for Women (AIAW), the current program began to take shape. The 1974 team, led by head coach Joyce King, went undefeated, boasting a record of 11–0–1. It was not until 1975 that the program made the switch from slow-pitch to fast-pitch. In that 1975 season, the team went 16–1 and made it to the AIAW Women's College World Series for the first time in program history, where it won two games and lost two. The early success continued as the 1976 team earned a spot in the Ohio State Invitational.

The MAC and the NCAA did not begin to recognize women's softball until 1980 and both neglected to sponsor a tournament until 1982. The first MAC tournament featured the Bobcats as the runner-up, losing to their rival Miami of Ohio. In her second season, head coach Tracy Bunge led the Bobcats to the most wins in a season with a record of 39–22, winning their first MAC title and their first appearance in the NCAA regional play.

In the 2014 season, the softball program won its first MAC tournament title. They were able to receive an automatic bid for the NCAA Championship tournament. During this season, they tied their record for most regular season wins at 32, while reaching their first national postseason tournament in 19 years.

The current head coach of the Bobcats is Kenzie Roark, was named the 11th head coach in the history of the OU softball program on August 25, 2017. Her time of coaching at Ohio University has been remarkable, as in her first season the 'Cats posted a 34–21 (12–8) record only having a losing streak of two during the season.

=== Basketball ===
Ohio's home basketball games are played at the 13,080-seat Convocation Center. Located on the West Green of Ohio University's main campus, the venue has a seating capacity of 13,080. Ohio is consistently one of the attendance leaders in the Mid-American Conference and has the ability to draw good crowds, win or lose. The arena was completed in 1968 and is the largest basketball facility in the Mid-American Conference. The Bobcats have won over 75% of their home games since the opening of The Convo. Prior to playing at the Convo, Ohio basketball games were first played in Bentley Hall and then at Grover Center, two buildings that today exist as office space and classrooms for the university. The Convocation Center brought in its largest crowd on February 28, 1970, when 14,102 fans were in attendance to watch the Bobcats men's basketball team defeat the Bowling Green Falcons 77–76.

==== Men's Basketball ====
The first Ohio basketball game occurred in 1907 when the Bobcats defeated the Parkersburg YMCA 46–9. Since that day, Ohio has posted a .571 winning percentage over their 100-year history and a .566 winning percentage in their 65 years in the Mid-American Conference. The Bobcats have won 7 Mid-American Conference tournament titles in 1983, 1985, 1994, 2005, 2010, 2012, and 2021. As well as 10 MAC regular-season titles in 1960, 1961, 1964, 1965, 1970, 1972, 1974, 1985, 1994, and 2013. Prior to joining the MAC, the 'Cats won an Ohio Athletic Conference title in 1921 and three Buckeye Athletic Association championships in 1931, 1933, and 1937. In addition, Ohio has played in the NCAA tournament 14 times, appearing in 1960, 1961, 1964, 1965, 1970, 1972, 1974, 1983, 1985, 1994, 2005, 2010, 2012, and 2021. The Bobcats have been selected for the National Invitation Tournament 5 times in 1941 (runner-up), 1969, 1986, 1995, and 2013, while also appearing in the College Basketball Invitational in 2008 and 2016, they made 2 appearances in the CollegeInsider.com Postseason Tournament in 2011 and 2014. As a result of the storied tradition of Ohio Bobcats basketball, the program was recently ranked 86th in Street & Smith's 100 Greatest Basketball Programs of All Time, published in 2005.

Some of Ohio's famous men's basketball coaches include Jim Snyder, Danny Nee, Larry Hunter and John Groce. Jim Snyder led the Bobcats for 26 years (1949–1974) and helped Ohio to 7 NCAA Tournament appearances and one NIT appearance. Snyder's teams compiled a 355–255 record, good for a .581 winning percentage. Former Ohio coach Danny Nee led Ohio for 7 years from 1980 to 1986. Nee helped rebuild the program from several years of losing records, and he helped lead the team to 2 MAC Tournament titles, 2 NCAA Tournament appearances, and one NIT appearance. Following Nee's tenure at Ohio, he took a job as head coach of the Nebraska Cornhuskers. Today Nee is the head coach of the Duquesne Dukes. Larry Hunter served as head coach of Ohio from 1989 to 2001, compiling a winning percentage of .580 (204–148). His teams made one NCAA Tournament appearance in 1994, an NIT appearance in 1995, and won the Pre-Season NIT in 1994. Despite his record as coach of the Bobcats, Hunter was relieved of his duties in 2001 for a lack of postseason success. Hunter later was the head coach of the Western Carolina Catamounts.

Ohio's head coach from 2001 to 2008 was Tim O'Shea. Coach O'Shea resigned on Monday, June 23, 2008, in order to become the head coach of Bryant University in Rhode Island. Coach O'Shea had arrived at Ohio in 2001 after 4 seasons as an assistant coach at his alma mater, Boston College. He came to Athens on March 29, 2001, and vowed to take the Ohio men's basketball program to what he called the "next level". This next-level was realized in 2005 as he led to Bobcats to a 21–11 record, a MAC Tournament Title, and an NCAA Tournament appearance in which 13 seed Ohio nearly upset 4 seed Florida. O'Shea's 2005–2006 team proved successful as well, posting a 19–11 record with wins over teams such as Rhode Island and Samford, and a close loss to Kentucky. The 2006–2007 team also posted 19 wins, with a final record of 19–13. A 20 win campaign happened in the 2007–2008 season, including notable non-conference wins over Maryland, St. John's, George Mason, and Bucknell. The team was extended an invite to the College Basketball Invitational, where the Bobcats advanced to the second round. On June 27, 2008, former Ohio State Buckeyes associate head coach John Groce was named the sixteenth head coach in Bobcats history. Groce brings fourteen years of assistant coaching experience to Athens, along with a pair of outright Big Ten regular-season titles, two NCAA tournament appearances, a berth in the 2007 NCAA National Championship game and the 2008 NIT title.

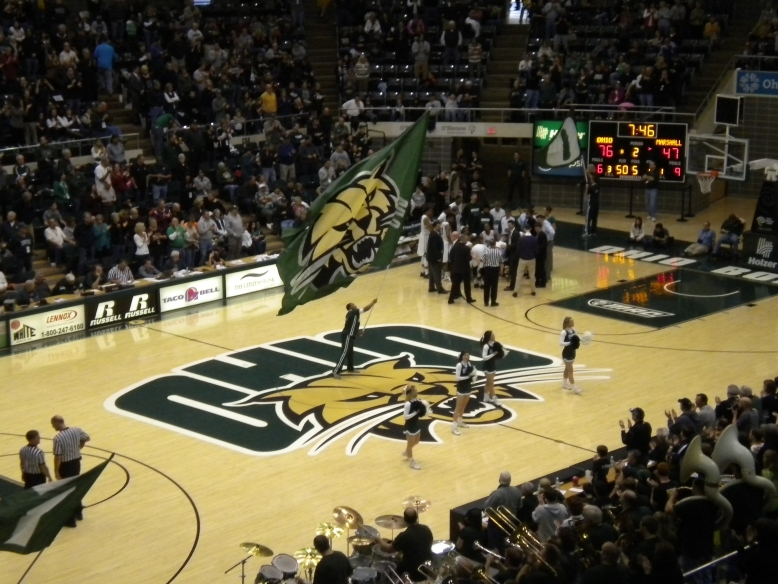
The 2013 Ohio versus Marshall men's basketball game at the Convocation Center in Athens, Ohio

On March 18, 2010, the men's basketball program recorded a 97–83 blowout of the Georgetown Hoyas. The upset marked the first time in NCAA tournament history that a fourteen seed defeated a three seed by double digits. Ohio defeated 4th seeded Michigan in the 2012 Tournament. They followed up the 2012 victory over Michigan with a 62–56 win over 12th seeded South Florida, reaching the Sweet Sixteen for the first time since 1964. On March 28, 2012, John Groce left the program to coach at the University of Illinois. He was replaced by Texas Christian University head coach Jim Christian on April 3, 2012. Christian became Ohio University's highest-paid faculty member in school history, having a base salary of $425,000 a year. He was replaced two years later on the same day after he got a coaching job at Boston College by Saul Phillips. Phillips was the head coach of North Dakota State.

Ohio hired Jeff Boals to replace Phillips as the head coach for the Bobcats on March 17, 2019. Boals (pronounced BOWLS) spent the past three seasons as the head coach at Stony Brook going 55–41 overall and 31–17 in America East play. Boals is a 1995 graduate of Ohio and was a two-time captain while garnering four varsity letters under the leadership of his head coach, the late Larry Hunter. The 2021 season culminated with another NCAA tournament berth and an upset victory over Virginia, followed by a large crowd taking to Court Street to celebrate.

==== Women's Basketball ====
The Bobcats have won three MAC Tournaments (1986, 1995, 2015) since beginning play in 1973 and starting MAC play in 1982. They have reached the NCAA Tournament in those three championship years. They have four MAC conferences (1986, 1995, 2015, 2016) and four division championships (2015, 2016, 2019, 2020). The women's team was the first team to win 30 games during the 2018-19 season going 30-6 losing in the quarterfinals of the 2019 WNIT. Their current coach is Bob Boldon; he has the most wins in program history.

=== Cross Country ===
The men's and women's teams are now coached by Sarah Pease and Ian Kellogg is an assistant for the Women's team. The Ohio Bobcats’ women's cross country team competes at Goldsberry Track in Athens, Ohio. The teams were previously coached by Elmore "Mo" Banton, a widely-known coach who became Ohio's first African American head coach in 1980 and stayed with the program for over twenty years.

==== Men's Cross Country ====
The Ohio Men's Cross-Country program claims MAC titles from 1962, 1964, and 1996. Known as the Worldwalker, from April 1983 to April 1987 alumnus Steve Newman became the first person to walk solo around the Earth. Ohio's former director of Compliance Craig Leon became a qualifier to the U.S. Olympic Trials for the marathon in Eugene, Oregon. Leon finished 10th at the 2013 Boston Marathon, the same race during the 2013 Boston Marathon bombing. The runners were greatly affected by the loss of the Men's Track program in 2007, but have continued mobilizing a club track program in the winter and spring to compete in mid- and long-distance events at various track meets throughout the country.

==== Women's Cross Country ====
The women's cross country team has been highly successful. Between 1980 and 2014, Ohio has had the top female runner in the MAC 7 times. During this time, four females have been named the first runner up for the best female athlete in the MAC. In 2013, Juli Accurso, became the first female runner in the MAC to win three consecutive conference titles. The women's cross country team has won the MAC Championship a total of 10 times, in the years 1987, 1988, 1989, 1990, 1991, 1992, 1994, 1997, 2006, and 2007.

=== Football ===
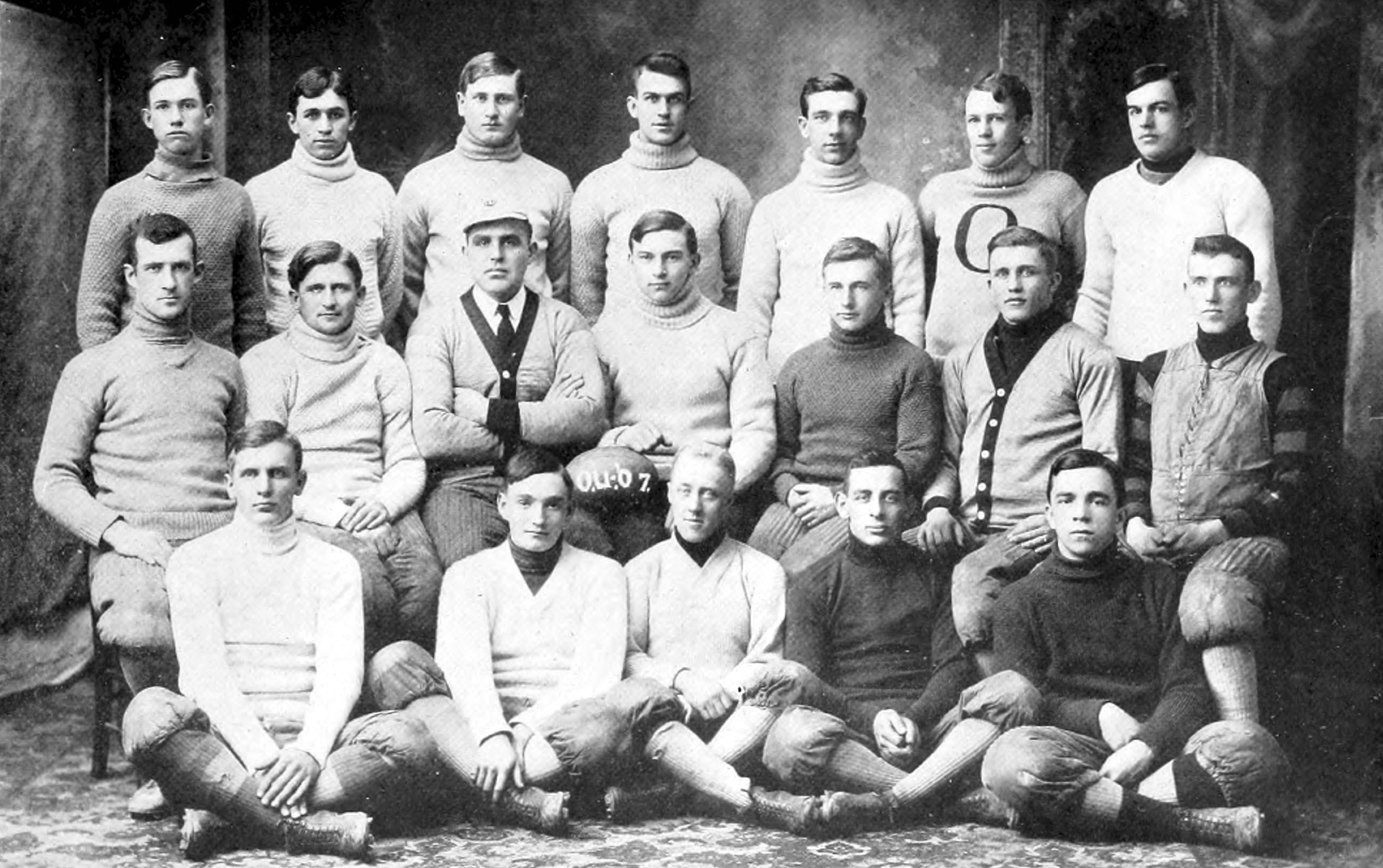
Ohio football team of 1908

The 2022 season staff includes head coach Tim Albin, and assistants and coordinators Spence Nowinsky, Scott Isphording, Allen Rudolph, Dwayne Dixon, Tremayne Scott, John Hauser, Brian Smith, DeAngelo Smith, Nate Faanes, Brian Metz, Jeremiah Covington, Kyle Pollock, Thomas Turnbaugh, Jake Miller, Matthias Reiber, Zoe Stoker, Ryan Kalukin, Nick Arleo, Luke Nardo, Kenny Zamberlin, Kyle Obly, Clay Finney, and Elaine Goodfellow.

Ohio Bobcats football began in 1894 with an 8–0 loss to Marietta College. Since that day, the Bobcats have posted a 584–580–65 record over their 127-year existence and a 252–248–12 record over their 75 years in the Mid-American Conference current members only.

Peden Stadium, built in 1929, is the oldest football venue in the MAC and among the oldest in the nation. Located on the south of Ohio University's campus in Athens, the venue has a seating capacity of 27,000 (with Victory Hill and Sook Center capacity included).

In 2010, Peden Stadium was designated an official Ohio Historical landmark site after a university alumnus, Michael A Massa, advanced the idea to Ohio University and State of Ohio officials. Many recent renovation and expansion efforts have allowed the stadium to keep pace with the ever-changing landscape of college football stadiums. As such, Peden Stadium is nicknamed "The Wrigley Field of College Football". The historic stadium brought its largest crowd on September 8, 2012, when 25,893 fans were in attendance to watch the Bobcats decisively beat the New Mexico State Aggies by a score of 51–24. This mark overtook the previous record set on September 5, 2009, when 24,617 fans were in attendance to watch the Bobcats drop a 23–16 decision to the Connecticut Huskies. The third largest crowd came on September 9, 2005, when 24,545 fans watched the Bobcats defeat the Pittsburgh Panthers 16–10. The fourth largest crowd was on September 17, 2011, when 24,422 fans watched the Bobcats defeat the Marshall Thundering Herd 44–7 in the Battle of the Bell. Ohio is consistently one of the attendance leaders in the Mid-American Conference.

The Bobcats have won five MAC Football championships in 1953, 1960, 1963, 1967, and 1968, and MAC East Division championships in 2006, 2009, and 2011. Prior to joining the MAC, the Bobcats won six Buckeye Athletic Association championships in 1929, 1930, 1931, 1935, 1936, and 1938. In 1960, the Bobcats were crowned National Small College Champions after compiling a 10–0 record under Coach Bill Hess. The Bobcats have appeared in six bowl games, losing 15–14 to West Texas State in the 1962 Sun Bowl, losing 49–42 to Richmond in the 1968 Tangerine Bowl, falling 28–7 to Southern Mississippi in the 2007 GMAC Bowl, losing 21–17 to Marshall in the 2009 Little Caesars Pizza Bowl, and losing to Troy in the 2010 New Orleans Bowl, 48–21, before finally winning a bowl game in the 2011 Famous Idaho Potato Bowl against Utah State, 24–23.

Some of Ohio's notable football coaches include Don Peden, Bill Hess, Jim Grobe, and current head coach Frank Solich. Peden coached from 1924 to 1946, compiling a 121–46–11 record, good for a winning percentage of .711 that still stands as the best ever for an Ohio football coach. Peden's teams won a total of 6 Buckeye Athletic Association Championships in his tenure and left a lasting mark on the program when the Bobcat's football stadium, Peden Stadium, was named in his honor following his retirement. Bill Hess's time at Ohio was equally impressive. Coaching from 1958 to 1977, Hess had a 108–91–4 record, giving him a winning percentage of .542 that is second only to Peden on Ohio's all-time list. Coach Hess's teams won 4 MAC Championships, participated in 2 bowl games, and won a National Small College Championship in 1960 after having an undefeated season. Former Ohio coach Jim Grobe took the helm of the Bobcats program in 1995, inheriting a squad that winless in the previous season. Grobe quickly turned the program around, as his teams went 8–3 in 1997 and 7–4 in 2000. Coach Grobe had a 33–33–1 record in his time at Ohio, good for a .500 winning percentage that is fourth among all Ohio football coaches. After the 2000 football season, Grobe took a job as head football coach at Wake Forest University.

Frank Solich was named the 28th football coach of the Bobcats on December 16, 2004. Prior to coming to Ohio, Solich spent many years as a part of the Nebraska Cornhuskers football program, as a player, an assistant coach, and later as the head coach. Solich was head coach of the Cornhuskers from 1998 to 2003 where he directed Nebraska to 6 consecutive bowl games, including the national championship game in the 2002 Rose Bowl. Solich's impact on the Ohio program was immediate, as plans were put in place to renovate Ohio's football facilities and increase financial support for the football program. Also, Ohio was selected to appear on national television 6 times for the 2005 football season, a record for the program. Frank Solich's first home game as coach of Ohio was a memorable one, as Peden Stadium brought in its largest ever crowd to watch the Bobcats defeat the University of Pittsburgh Panthers 16–10.

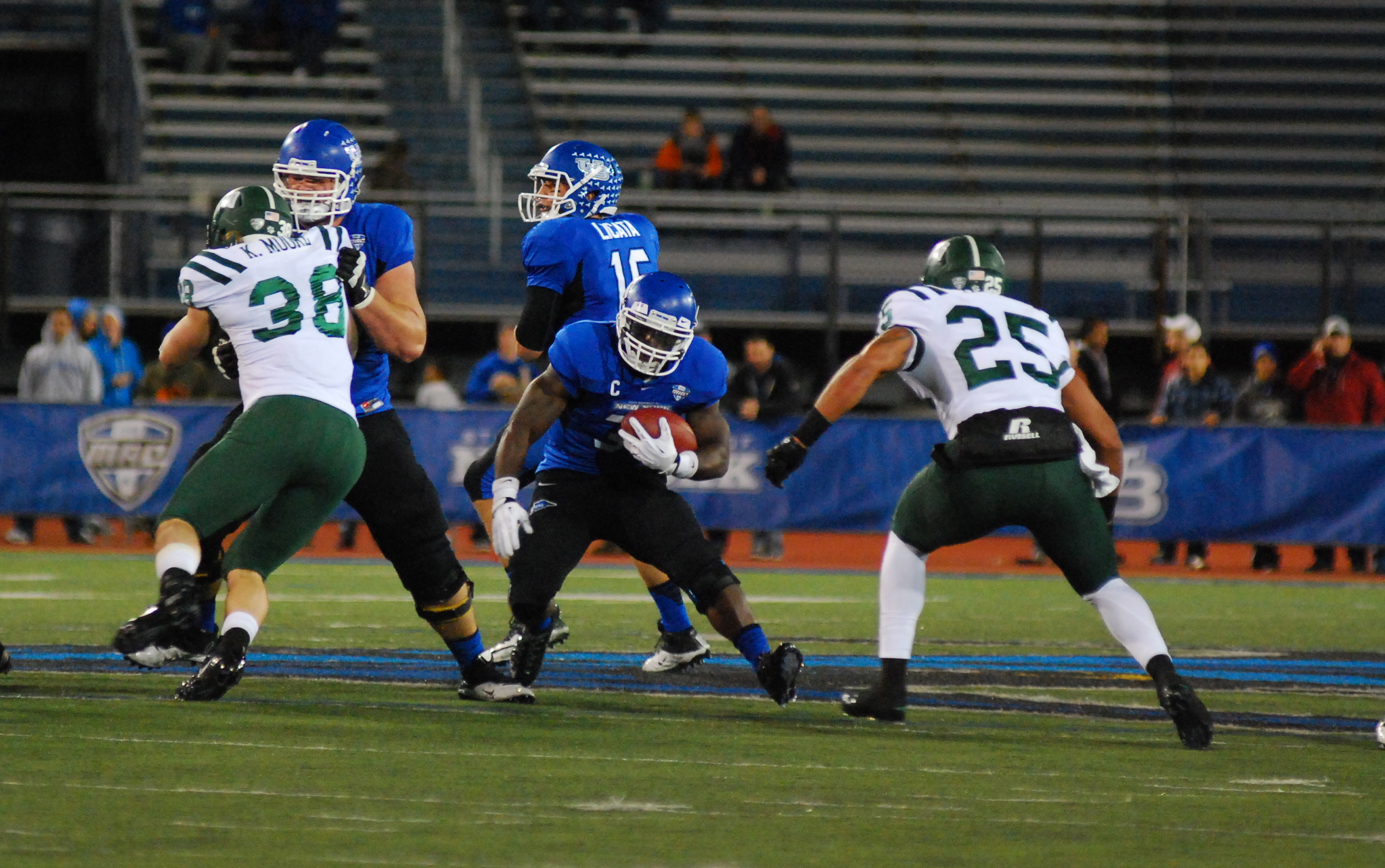
Ohio v Buffalo game in 2013

Under the guidance of Frank Solich, the Ohio football program has enjoyed a return to national prominence. On November 16, 2006, the Bobcats secured their first-ever MAC East Division title and their first football championship of any sort since 1968 with a victory over the Akron Zips. They then advanced to the MAC Championship Game in Detroit, where they were defeated by Central Michigan 31–10. On January 7, 2007, the Bobcats acted as the MAC representative in the GMAC Bowl in Mobile, Alabama, losing 28–7 to the University of Southern Mississippi Golden Eagles in a game nationally televised on ESPN. The Bobcats followed up the 2006 campaign with a 6–6 record in 2007, and was one of six bowl eligible programs that was not invited to post-season play. The Bobcats returned to the post-season in 2009, posting a 9–3 regular season record and another MAC East Championship. Ohio played in the MAC Championship Game, where they fell to Central Michigan 20–10. On December 26, 2009, the Bobcats fell 21–17 to the Thundering Herd in the Little Caesars Pizza Bowl. Ohio won back-to-back bowl games in the 2011 Famous Idaho Potato Bowl and 2012 Independence Bowl and three straight games in the 2017 Bahamas Bowl, 2018 Frisco Bowl and the Famous Idaho Potato Bowl after the 2019 season. Ohio was bowl eligible for twelve consecutive seasons from 2009 through 2020 at the end of Solich's tenure.

On July 14, 2021, following Solich's retirement, longtime Bobcat offensive coordinator Tim Albin was named the 29th head coach of the program.

Albin led the Bobcats to three straight nine win regular seasons in 2022, 2023, and 2024 In 2024, at 7–1 in MAC play they qualified to play Miami in the MAC Championship game Ohio avenged their only MAC loss and defeated Miami 38–3 to win the MAC outright. Albin brought Ohio their first MAC Championship since 1968 but to take the head coaching position at Charlotte. Offensive coordinator Brian Smith was promoted to head coach for the Cure Bowl. Smith earned his first win in the bowl where the Bobcats got school record 11th and three straight seasons with at least 10 wins. It was the program's sixth straight bowl win.

=== Golf ===
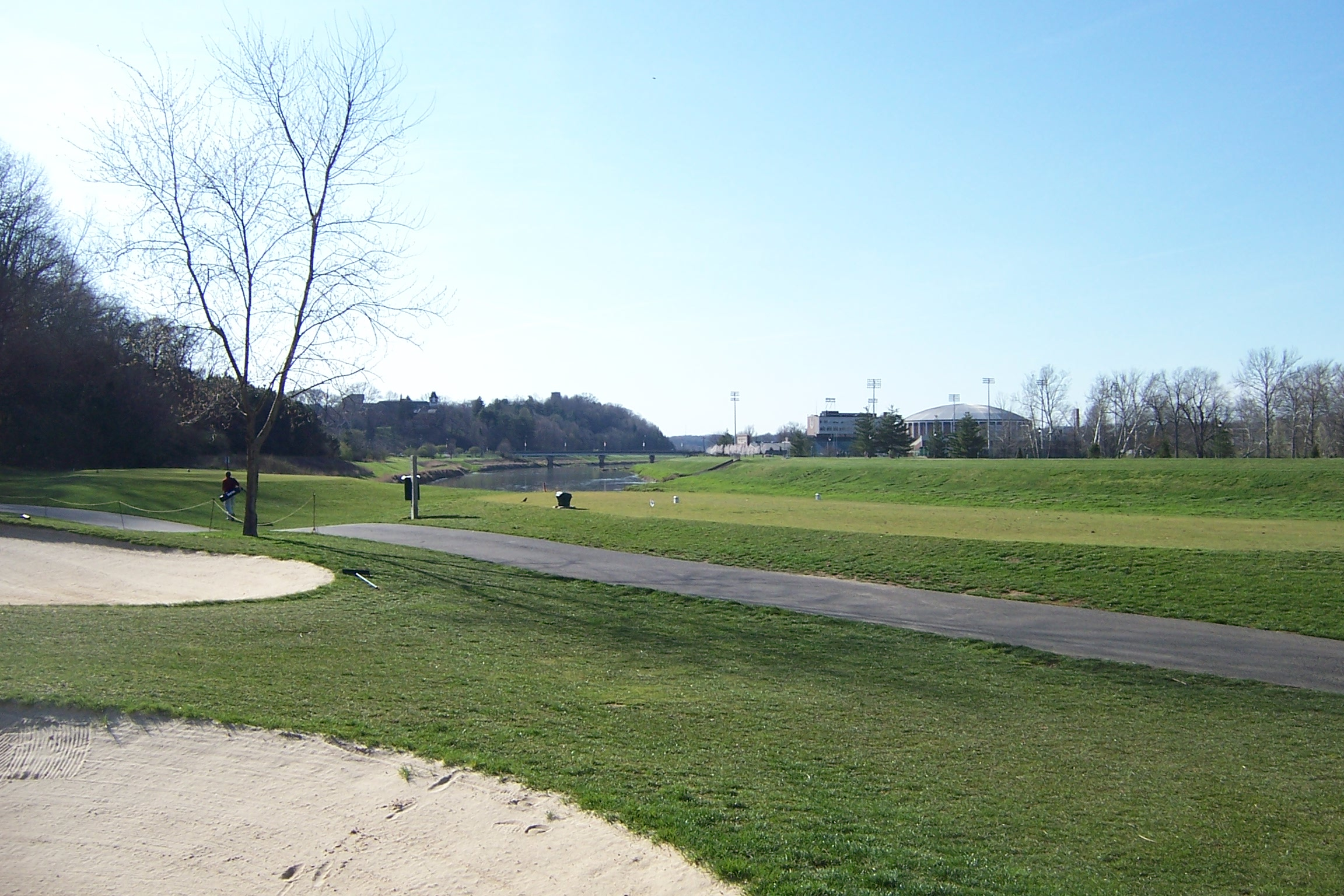
The Ohio University Golf Course

The Ohio Bobcats golf teams are two of the only teams in the MAC that possess their own golf course. Both the men's and women's teams have several notable victories in national tournaments and compete at regular matches across the country.

==== Men's Golf ====
Through the 2014 season, the men's golf team has won 18 MAC tournament titles: 1951–55, 1957–61, 1963–65, 1967, 1969, 1971, 1979–80 (1954 co-champions with Kent State). PGA Tour golfer Dow Finsterwald is among the Ohio golf program's famous alumni. The current head coach is Brennan Whitis, who previously competed for Wittenberg University from 2014 to 2018.

=== Ice Hockey ===
Ohio has had a men's ice hockey team for over 60 years and won five Division I ACHA titles. The Bobcats briefly fielded an NCAA Division I program in the early 1970s but dropped their program down to club status in 1973. Ohio was one of four founding members of the CCHA along with Bowling Green, Ohio State and Saint Louis. The Bobcats played in the CCHA for two seasons but finished dead-last both years. Ohio won only a single conference game in either season and after the 1972–73 season both Ohio and Ohio State left the CCHA. While the Buckeyes kept their team at the varsity level the Bobcats dropped their team back to club status where they have remained as of 2019.

=== Volleyball ===
The 2022 season coaching staff for Ohio volleyball includes head coach Geoff Carlston, assistant coach Kenzie Crawford, assistant coach Andrew Kroger, and graduate assistant Olena Fedorenko. The volleyball coaching staff offices are located inside the Convocation Center, where the volleyball team competes during their regular intercollegiate seasons.

Ohio's volleyball team has been steadily increasing national prominence: Under the direction of Coach Geoff Carlston, the team won five consecutive Mid-American Conference regular season championships from 2003 to 2007, and 4 consecutive MAC tournament titles from 2003 to 2006. The team has appeared in the NCAA Tournament every year since 2003, and made the "Sweet 16" of the NCAA tournament in 2005. Following the end of the 2007 season, Coach Geoff Carlston moved on to take the head coaching position at Ohio State University, with Ohio naming former Florida assistant Ryan Theis to the vacant head coaching position. Under the direction of Theis, the Bobcats have won 2 MAC regular season titles and have recorded 2 NCAA Tournament appearances.

The 2014 season was highly successful, with Deane Webb as their new head coach. Overall, the team went 23–6 on the season and remained undefeated in the MAC for the fourth time ever, their first since 2006. They won the MAC East Division title for 12th time and won the MAC regular season title for the second year in a row, their ninth overall. Their junior setter, Abby Gilleland, won the MAC Player of the Year, MAC Setter of the Year, and First Team All-MAC honors for the second year in a row. Meredith Ashy, also a junior, was the first player in Ohio Bobcats history to receive the MAC Defensive Player of the Year award, as well as being named First Team All-MAC selection. Graduating senior Kelly Lamberti capped her career off as one of two players to receive four First Team All-MAC honors.

=== Swimming and Diving ===
Ohio's women's swimming and diving team has won 11 MAC championships in 1989, 1990, 1991, 1992, 1993, 1994, 1995, 2000, 2001, 2008 and 2011. This is more than any other women's swimming and diving program in the conference. The team competes in The Ohio University Aquatic Center, one of the finest swimming and diving facilities in the conference. The OUAC has hosted many Mid-American Conference Championship meets. Paul Anastacio is considered their best men's swimmer ever. The 2022 staff includes head coach Mason Norman, head diving coach Britni Fisher, assistant coach James Washbish, and Talisa Lemke, Raeleigh Mooij, Sarah Deering, and Kristina Rana.

=== Women's Soccer ===
Women's soccer at Ohio University began in 1997 under head coach Wendy Logan. Logan won the MAC Coach of the Year award in 1997, then led the team to their first regular season MAC champion title in 1998. In 2000, Stacy Strauss took over the head coach position and remained until 2012. During this time, Strauss led the 2001 and 2004 teams to become the MAC regular season champions. The Bobcats won their first ever MAC Tournament in 2023, defeating Kent State 2–1 in the final.

The current head coach is Aaron Rodgers, who took over the program in 2013. He was the former Kentucky Wildcats assistant coach. In his first two seasons at Ohio University, he has led the team to a combined record of 33–0–0. As head coach, Aaron Rodgers led the Bobcats to their first ever MAC Championship and NCAA Tournament appearance. The 2023 staff includes associate headcoach Cortney Wiesler, assistants Ash Allanson, Konstantina Giannou, and Lucy Brasil.

=== Track and Field ===
The current coaching staff of the track program includes Sarah Pease, Ian Kellogg, and Jeneva Stevens. After accepting the position in June 2003, Clay Calkins led the men's track and field teams to 4 years of success, only ending because of the 2007 Title IX legislation, which eliminated a total of 4 teams. Under his coaching, the numerous female athletes have become MAC and Regional Champions, as well as multiple national qualifiers.

The team as a whole has won the MAC Championship in 1983, 1984, and 1994. Ohio's coach Diane Stamm won the MAC Women's Track Coach of the Year in the years 1982, 1983, 1984. In 1994, Elmore Banton, Ohio head coach, became the most recent coach from the Bobcats to win the award.

=== Wrestling ===
The Ohio University wrestling program's inception was in 1919, when Thor Olson, the so-called "Granddaddy of Collegiate Wrestling", coached the very first Bobcat varsity wrestling team to a 1–1 record. The first of its kind at any university or institution in the state of Ohio, that wrestling team established a tradition that has continued under the leadership of past coaches like Fred Schleicher and Harry Houska. Present coach Joel Greenlee is entering his 17th season as the head coach of the Bobcat wrestling program after helping five individuals earn bids for the 2013 NCAA Wrestling Championships. Recent Bobcat standout wrestler Jake Percival was at the 2004 NCAA meet, less than 40 seconds away from becoming Ohio's fifth national champion, but a late two-point reversal by Stanford's Matt Gentry in the 157-pound finals resulted in a second-place finish for Percival as the Bobcats placed 25th in the country under the guidance of Greenlee. Percival, the three-time MAC Wrestler of the Year, became the first four-time All-American in MAC history with a third-place finish at nationals in 2005. During his senior season, the Elyria native passed Enright (115–31) and Gardner (122–26) to become the school's all-time wins leader. He ended his career with a 142–10 record, including 18–6 in the NCAA Tournament, 113–4 during the regular season and a 17–0 mark in the conference. Ohio University wrestling home dual meets and tournaments take place in the Convocation Center located on campus.

=== Other teams ===
MAC Championships in parentheses:

- Women's golf
- Women's indoor track and field
- Women's field hockey (1987, 1991, 2006, 2007, 2009)

=== 2007 Athletic eliminations ===
On January 25, 2007, then-Athletic Director Kirby Hocutt announced the elimination of four varsity sports at Ohio University. Those sports include: men's swimming and diving, men's indoor track, men's outdoor track and women's lacrosse. The decision was announced without any advance warning to those involved, causing major tension between the student-athletes and the administration.

== Traditions and history ==
For the 2004 bicentennial biography of the university, the institution commissioned a book documenting the university's history. Betty Hollow's bicentennial publication Ohio University: The Spirit of a Singular Place describes many historical events in the university's athletic program.

In her book, Hollow records that Frank Super, the son of university president Charles W. Super, took time from his electrical engineering studies to quarterback Ohio's first gridiron squad in 1894. Local businesses and "sympathizers", or fans, sported light-blue decorations and ribbons to show their support. Not only two years later, in 1896, did Ohio teams adopt green and white as school colors, chosen by the student body's vote. Hal Rowland, a former student, won the $10.00 contest to put forward the idea of a nickname that exemplified the team's tenacity and fighting spirit best: the Bobcat was born. Women's sports had advanced over many years at Ohio University, starting originally as the tennis club and participation in the field day, where women could only compete in the baseball throw. The football team was invited to meet U.S. President Herbert Hoover at the White House in 1932. Despite wide acclaim, football's legacy at the university is presently out-shined by Bobcat baseball.

Number "54" is the only number ever retired at Ohio University. It belonged to Frank Baumholtz, a two-sport star and one of the few athletes ever to play two professional sports. Baumholtz and men's basketball head coach W. J. "Dutch" Trautwein led the Cats to the 1941 National Invitational Tournament championship, building upon standards established by Butch Grover during his 16-year run as head coach from 1922 to 1938. Larry Hunter is one on a distinguished list of coaches that also includes Jim Snyder, whose twenty-five seasons produced 355 wins, conference crowns, and NCAA and NIT appearances. Baumholtz signed with the Cincinnati Reds in 1941. Bob Wren, a Bobcat infielder, was named coach in 1949 and in his twenty-three seasons his teams won almost 500 games, never suffering a losing season. Future major leaguers like Phillies's Hall of Famer Mike Schmidt fueled Wren's powerhouse ballclubs. In fact, the 1970 team with Schmidt and future coach Joe Carbone as players advanced all the way to the College World Series, upsetting Southern California in the first round.

In 1974, the university awarded its first athletic scholarships to women and Wendy Weeden Devine was the first woman inducted into the Ohio University Athletic Hall of Fame. Instrumental within the university administrators building equal opportunities for women through increased spending and scholarship support was Peggy Pruitt, who retired in 2001. Building upon a tradition that has produced such stand-outs as Anita Corl Miller-Huntsman, Shelly Morris's field hockey team earned a MAC championship and an NCAA appearance in 2001. Wendy Weeden Devine, 1974, became the first woman inducted into the Ohio University Athletic Hall of Fame. An Ohio All-American and 1964 NCAA cross-country champion, Elmore "Mo" Banton led the cross-country and track and field teams as a coach to many MAC championships and NCAA highlights. Retiring in 1972, baseball's Coach Wren gave way to Jerry France, who coached future World Series skipper Bob Brenly of the Arizona Diamondbacks. France won almost 400 games, and his successor Joe Carbone added another 400 victories to the tradition.

Sporting News ranked Ohio University thirty-second in the nation for overall achievement in 2001, ahead of such powerhouses as Florida State, Iowa, Kentucky, Georgia Tech, and Kansas.

=== The Marching 110 ===
Ohio's marching band is The Ohio University Marching 110. On October 28, 1976, the Marching 110 became the first marching band in history to perform at Carnegie Hall. The Marching 110 performed in Bill Clinton's first inaugural parade through Washington, D.C., in January 1993 when Clinton personally asked his campaign chairman, alumnus David Wilhelm, for the band to march and perform to throngs of thousands of Americans greeting the new first family. The band has also performed at many professional football games and has taken part in the Macy's Thanksgiving Day Parade in 2000 and 2005. Called "The Most Exciting Band in the Land", the band is widely regarded as one of the best in the nation and was ranked by Link Magazine in 1996 as one of the Top 10 college marching bands in the nation. They perform at every Ohio home football game.

=== Athletic Traditions ===
Many of those traditions are associated with athletics events on campus. Ohio traditions include:

- Rufus the Bobcat – The school mascot, a fierce yet friendly looking Bobcat that always sports an Ohio jersey with a number "1" on the back.
- Battle of the Bricks – games and contests against Miami RedHawks; originally referred to football but has since been used to refer to any contest against Miami University teams.
- University Seal – legend has it that freshman must avoid stepping on the university seal or risk bad fortune in both athletics and in the classroom.
- Kissing Arch – The Archway of Scott Quad, tradition maintains, provides eternal love to those who kiss beneath it.
- Stand Up and Cheer – Ohio's fight song
- Alma Mater, Ohio – Ohio's alma mater song
- Salute to the Students – Following every Ohio home football game, the players head to the student section to thank them for attending.
- The Cannon – After every Ohio score, a 19th-century style military cannon is fired. When the Bobcats enter the field, the cannon shoots off a smoke "O" that can be seen for several minutes before fading into the air.
- Rubbing the Bobcat – Supporters and students rub the head of the life-sized bobcat sculpture located at the front entrance to the stadium, before each game. Tradition has it that touching the statue before a game will ensure luck on the athletic field.
- The O Zone – The student cheering section at every Ohio football & men's basketball game.
- Gang Green – The student cheering section at every Ohio club hockey game.
- Tail-Great Park – The park across from Peden Stadium is transformed for every home football game into "Tail-Great Park". The park features kid's games, live music, and tailgating on gameday.
- Homecoming Parade – The annual homecoming parade at Ohio begins in downtown Athens and ends in the Peden Stadium parking lot just in time for the game. Always on a Saturday afternoon, homecoming is always one of the highest attended games of the football season.
- CatFX- The graphics and videos displayed on the videoboards at Peden Stadium and the Convocation center.

=== Varsity Ohio ===
Varsity Ohio is the alumni organization for intercollegiate student-athletes, and sponsors the annual all-sports reunion during the week of Homecoming.

== Arenas and facilities ==
Ohio's athletic facilities and the teams that utilize them are as follows:

- Peden Stadium (Football) and Solich Field
- Convocation Center (Basketball, Volleyball, Wrestling)
- Bob Wren Stadium (Baseball)
- Ohio Softball Field (Softball)
- Ohio University Aquatic Center (Swimming and Diving)
- Chessa Field (Women's Soccer)
- Pruitt Field (Field Hockey)
- Walters Inside Multipurpose Fieldhouse
- Goldsberry Track (Track and field)
- Athens Country Club (Men's and Women's Golf)
- Ossian C. Bird Arena (Men's Ice Hockey Club)

== Kermit Blosser Ohio Athletics Hall of Fame ==
The Kermit Blosser Ohio Athletics Hall of Fame was established in 1965. Inductees to the Blosser Ohio Athletics Hall of Fame are inducted during banquet ceremonies the evening prior to a designated home football game. Inductees are also recognized during a special halftime ceremony at the football game the following day. A portrait and accomplishments are displayed in the Ohio Athletics Hall of Fame located in the Convocation Center.

== Department Administration ==
Julie Cromer was named the new director of athletics at Ohio University by President M. Duane Nellis. Ohio's senior staff includes: Amy Dean (Senior Associate AD/Administration & Sport Programs), Michael Stephens (Associate AD/External Operations), Lauren Ashman (Associate AD/Compliance), Randee Duffy (Associate AD/NCAA Eligibility & Student Athlete Success), Ryan White (Associate AD/Development), Tim Knavel (Associate AD/Business Operations) and Matt Molde (General Manager Ohio IMG Sports Marketing). The department relies on numerous graduate assistants, interns, students, and recent graduates in its operations to both foster experience in athletic management and undertake the work required for maintaining NCAA Division I programming.

== Radio network ==
The official radio home of the Ohio Bobcats is the Ohio IMG Sports Network. The first MAC network to reach into Columbus, the Ohio IMG Sports Network continues to serve the university's alumni base and fans in other parts of southeastern Ohio and parts of northern West Virginia and eastern Kentucky. The radio voice of the Bobcats is Russ Eisenstein with Rob Cornelius as color analyst for Bobcat football and men's basketball and Tom Hodson as the football sideline reporter.

The network features 13 radio affiliations throughout southeast and central Ohio, and into West Virginia:

- WXTQ-FM 105.5 Athens, Ohio
- WOUC-FM 89.1 Cambridge, Ohio
- WOUH-FM 91.9 Chillicothe, Ohio
- WYTS-AM 1230 Columbus, Ohio
- WOUL-FM 89.1 Ironton, Ohio
- WMOA-AM 1490 Marietta, Ohio
- WJAW-FM 100.9 McConnelsville, Ohio
- WMPO-AM 1390 Middleport, Ohio
- WMPO-FM 97.1 Pomeroy, Ohio
- WVAM-AM 1450 Parkersburg, West Virginia
- WJAW AM 630 St. Marys, West Virginia
- WRAC FM 103.1 West Union, Ohio
- WOUZ-FM 90.1 Zanesville, Ohio
