= 2013 Mid-American Conference football season =

- League: NCAA Division I FBS (Football Bowl Subdivision)
- Sport: football
- Teams: 13

Regular season
- Season MVP: Jordan Lynch

Football seasons
- 2012 2014

2013 Mid-American Conference football standings
| | Conf. | | | Overall |
| Team | W | | L | W | | L |
|---|---|---|---|---|---|---|
East Division
| Bowling Green x$ | 7 | – | 1 | 10 | – | 4 |
| Buffalo | 6 | – | 2 | 8 | – | 5 |
| Ohio | 4 | – | 4 | 7 | – | 6 |
| Akron | 4 | – | 4 | 5 | – | 7 |
| Kent State | 3 | – | 5 | 4 | – | 8 |
| UMass | 1 | – | 7 | 1 | – | 11 |
| Miami (OH) | 0 | – | 8 | 0 | – | 12 |
West Division
| Northern Illinois x | 8 | – | 0 | 12 | – | 2 |
| Ball State | 7 | – | 1 | 10 | – | 3 |
| Toledo | 5 | – | 3 | 7 | – | 5 |
| Central Michigan | 5 | – | 3 | 6 | – | 6 |
| Eastern Michigan | 1 | – | 7 | 2 | – | 10 |
| Western Michigan | 1 | – | 7 | 1 | – | 11 |
Championship: Bowling Green 47, Northern Illinois 27
$ – Conference champion; x – Division champion/co-champions

The 2013 Mid-American Conference football season was the 68th season for the Mid-American Conference (MAC). The University of Massachusetts who joined the conference the previous season would now be eligible for the conference championship as well as bowl games. Last season at the Marathon MAC Championship game, Northern Illinois defeated Kent State 44–37 for the championship.

== 2013 MAC Specialty Award Winners ==
Vern Smith Leadership Award Winner: QB Jordan Lynch, Northern Illinois
Coach of the Year: Rod Carey, Northern Illinois
Offensive Player of the Year: QB Jordan Lynch, Northern Illinois
Defensive Player of the Year: LB Khalil Mack, Buffalo
Special Teams Player of the Year: K Jeremiah Detmer, Toledo
Freshman of the Year: WR Corey Davis, Western Michigan

== All-Conference teams ==
2013 All-MAC First Team Offense
Quarterback – Jordan Lynch, Northern Illinois
Center – Chief Kekuewa, Bowling Green
Offensive Linemen – Dominic Flewellyn, Bowling Green
Offensive Lineman – Tyler Loos, Northern Illinois
Offensive Lineman – Jasen Carlson, Buffalo
Offensive Linemen – Jordan Hansel, Ball State
Tight End – Zane Fakes, Ball State
Wide Receiver – Willie Snead IV, Ball State
Wide Receiver – Alex Neutz, Buffalo
Wide Receiver – Titus Davis, Central Michigan
Wide Receiver – Tommylee Lewis, Northern Illinois
Running Back – Branden Oliver, Buffalo
Running Back – David Fluellen, Toledo
Placekicker – Jeremiah Detmer, Toledo

2013 All-MAC First Team Defense
Outside Linebacker – Khalil Mack, Buffalo
Outside Linebacker – Jamaal Bass, Northern Illinois
Inside Linebacker – Junior Sylvestre, Toledo
Inside Linebacker – Jatavis Brown, Akron
Down Lineman – Roosevelt Nix, Kent State
Down Lineman – Jonathan Newsome, Ball State
Down Lineman – Ken Bishop, Northern Illinois
Down Lineman – Jayrone Elliott, Toledo
Defensive Back – Jimmie Ward, Northern Illinois
Defensive Back – BooBoo Gates, Bowling Green
Defensive Back – Dayonne Nunley, Miami
Defensive Back – Najja Johnson, Buffalo
Punter – Zac Murphy, Miami

2013 All-MAC First Team Specialists
Kickoff Return Specialist – Devin Bass, Ohio
Punt Return Specialist – T. J. Carrie, Ohio

2013 All-MAC Second Team Offense
Quarterback – Keith Wenning, Ball State
Center – Zac Kerin, Toledo
Offensive Lineman – Greg Mancz, Toledo
Offensive Lineman – Jared Volk, Northern Illinois
Offensive Lineman – Andy Phillips, Central Michigan
Offensive Lineman – Alex Huettel, Bowling Green
Tight End – Tyreese Russell, Eastern Michigan
Wide Receiver – Bernard Reedy, Toledo
Wide Receiver – Da'Ron Brown, Northern Illinois
Wide Receiver – Corey Davis, Western Michigan
Wide Receiver – Donte Foster, Ohio
Running Back – Travis Greene, Bowling Green
Running Back – Jahwan Edwards, Ball State
Placekicker – Josiah Yazdani, Ohio

2013 All-MAC Second Team Defense
Outside Linebacker – D.J. Lynch, Bowling Green
Outside Linebacker – Gabe Martin, Bowling Green
Inside Linebacker – Ben Ingle, Ball State
Inside Linebacker – Kent Kern, Miami
Down Lineman – Nate Ollie, Ball State
Down Lineman – Travonte Boles, Western Michigan
Down Lineman – Ted Ouellet, Bowling Green
Down Lineman – Wes Williams, Miami
Defensive Back – Jeff Garrett, Ball State
Defensive Back – Malachi Freeman, Akron
Defensive Back – Devin Bass, Ohio
Defensive Back – Darius Polk, Kent State
Punter – Anthony Melchiori, Kent State

2013 All-MAC Second Team Specialists
Kickoff Return Specialist – Jamill Smith, Ball State
Punt Return Specialist – Ryan Burbrink, Bowling Green

2013 All-MAC Third Team Offense
Quarterback – Terrance Owens, Toledo
Center – Jacob Richard, Ball State
Offensive Lineman – Anthony Dima, UMass
Offensive Lineman – Jeff Myers, Toledo
Offensive Lineman – Jarrod Pughsley, Akron
Offensive Lineman – Lincoln Hansen, Eastern Michigan
Tight End – Alex Bayer, Bowling Green
Wide Receiver – Jordan Williams-Lambert, Ball State
Wide Receiver – Dri Archer, Kent State
Wide Receiver – Jamill Smith, Ball State
Wide Receiver – Alonzo Russell, Toledo
Running Back – Bronson Hill, Eastern Michigan
Running Back – Jawon Chisholm, Akron
Placekicker – Scott Secor, Ball State

2013 All-MAC Third Team Defense
Outside Linebacker – Justin March, Akron
Outside Linebacker – Adam Redden, Buffalo
Inside Linebacker – Shamari Benton, Central Michigan
Inside Linebacker – Justin Cherocci, Central Michigan
Down Lineman – Colby Way, Buffalo
Down Lineman – Joe Windsor, Northern Illinois
Down Lineman – Nico Caponi, Akron
Down Lineman – Treyvon Hester, Toledo
Defensive Back – Dechane Durante, Northern Illinois
Defensive Back – Luke Wollet, Kent State
Defensive Back – Donald Celiscar, Western Michigan
Defensive Back – Travis Carrie, Ohio
Punter – Zach Paul, Akron

2013 All-MAC Third Team Specialists
Kickoff Return Specialist – Dri Archer, Kent State
Punt Return Specialist – Jamill Smith, Ball State
