= 2013 MAC Championship Game =

2013 Marathon MAC Championship Game
- Conference Championship
Bowling Green Falcons	Northern Illinois Huskies
(9–3)	(12–0)
47	27
Head coach: Dave Clawson	Head coach: Rod Carey
	AP / Coaches / BCS; 16 / 18 / 14
	1	2	3	4	Total
Bowling Green	17	14	0	16	47
Northern Illinois	7	6	7	7	27
- Date: December 6, 2013
- Season: 2013
- Stadium: Ford Field
- Location: Detroit, Michigan
- MVP: QB Matt Johnson (Bowling Green)
- Favorite: NIU −3
- Attendance: 21,106

United States TV coverage
- Network: ESPN
- Announcers: Carter Blackburn, Danny Kanell, & Allison Williams

2013 Mid-American Conference football standings
	Conf.			Overall
Team	W		L	W		L
East Division
Bowling Green x$	7	–	1	10	–	4
Buffalo	6	–	2	8	–	5
Ohio	4	–	4	7	–	6
Akron	4	–	4	5	–	7
Kent State	3	–	5	4	–	8
UMass	1	–	7	1	–	11
Miami (OH)	0	–	8	0	–	12
West Division
Northern Illinois x	8	–	0	12	–	2
Ball State	7	–	1	10	–	3
Toledo	5	–	3	7	–	5
Central Michigan	5	–	3	6	–	6
Eastern Michigan	1	–	7	2	–	10
Western Michigan	1	–	7	1	–	11
Championship: Bowling Green 47, Northern Illinois 27
$ – Conference champion; x – Division champion/co-champions

The 2013 Mid-American Football Championship Game was played on December 6, 2013, between the winners of the East division, the Bowling Green Falcons and the winners of the West division, the Northern Illinois Huskies. The Championship game determined the 2013 football champion of the Mid-American Conference (MAC). The winner was to be the Mid-American Conference representative for the 2014 GoDaddy.com Bowl on January 5, 2014, in Mobile, Alabama. Going into the game, Northern Illinois was hoping for an undefeated season and another chance at a BCS game. Bowling Green ended that dream with a 47–27 win.

== Scoring summary ==
2013 MAC Championship Game
Bowling Green Falcons (9–3, 7–1) vs. (14) Northern Illinois Huskies (12–0, 8–0)

Quarter	1	2	3	4	Total
Bowling Green	17	14	0	16	47
Northern Illinois	7	6	7	7	27

at Ford Field • Detroit, MI

- Date: Friday, December 6, 2013
- Game time: 8:00 p.m. EST
- Game weather: N/A (game played indoors)
- Game attendance: 21,106
- TV announcers (ESPN): Danny Kanell, Carter Blackburn and Allison Williams

1st quarter scoring:

- 12:27 BGSU Tyler Beck 28 yard pass from Matt Johnson (Tyler Tate kick)
- 9:08 NIU Juwan Brescacin 14 yard pass from Jordan Lynch (Mathew Sims kick)
- 6:49 BGSU Tyler Tate 26 yard field goal
- 2:32 BGSU Ronnie Moore 36 yard pass from Matt Johnson (Tyler Tate kick)

2nd quarter scoring:

- 14:51 NIU Mathew Sims 51 yard field goal
- 11:22 NIU Mathew Sims 45 yard field goal
- 5:39 BGSU Heath Jackson 22 yard pass from Matt Johnson (Tyler Tate kick)
- 0:13 BGSU Alex Bayer 12 yard pass from Matt Johnson (Tyler Tate kick)

3rd quarter scoring:

- 12:23 NIU Jordan Lynch 8 yard run (Mathew Sims kick)

4th quarter scoring:

- 14:50 BGSU Tyler Tate 52 yard field goal
- 10:17 BGSU Travis Greene 6 yard pass from Matt Johnson
- 2:44 BGSU Travis Greene 16 yard run (Tyler Tate kick)
- 0:14 NIU Jordan Lynch 2 yard run (Mathew Sims kick)

=== Statistics ===
Statistics	BG	NIU
First downs	27	29
Plays–yards	574	454
Rushes–yards	40-181-1	42–235-2
Passing yards	393	219
Passing: comp–att–int	21–27–0	21–40–2
Time of possession	34:10	24:58

Team	Category	Player	Statistics
Bowling Green	Passing	Matt Johnson	21/27, 393 yards, 5 TD
Bowling Green	Rushing	Travis Greene	26 carries, 133 yards, 1 TD
Bowling Green	Receiving	Ronnie Moore	4 receptions, 145 yards, 1 TD
Northern Illinois	Passing	Jordan Lynch	21/40, 219 yards, 1 TD
Northern Illinois	Rushing	Jordan Lynch	26 carries, 126 yards, 2 TD
Northern Illinois	Receiving	Juwan Brescacin	6 receptions, 71 yards, 1 TD
