= 2013 Poinsettia Bowl =

2013 San Diego County Credit Union Poinsettia Bowl
Utah State Aggies	Northern Illinois Huskies
(8–5)	(12–1)
Mountain West	MAC
21	14
Head coach: Matt Wells	Head coach: Rod Carey
	AP / Coaches / BCS; 24 / 23 / 23
	1	2	3	4	Total
Utah State	3	3	7	8	21
Northern Illinois	0	7	0	7	14
- Date: December 26, 2013
- Season: 2013
- Stadium: Qualcomm Stadium
- Location: San Diego, California
- MVP: Offense: Joey DeMartino Utah State Running Back; Defense: Jake Doughty Utah State Linebacker
- Favorite: Utah State by 1
- Referee: Shawn Hochuli (Pac-12)
- Attendance: 23,408
- Payout: US$500,000 per team

United States TV coverage
- Network: ESPN
- Announcers: Joe Davis (play-by-play); Mike Bellotti (analyst); Cara Capuano (sideline reporter)

The 2013 Poinsettia Bowl was an American college football bowl game that was played on December 26, 2013 at Qualcomm Stadium in San Diego, California. The ninth edition of the Poinsettia Bowl, it featured the Mountain West Conference Mountain Division champion Utah State Aggies against the Mid-American Conference West Division champion Northern Illinois Huskies. It was one of the 2013–14 bowl games that concluded the 2013 FBS football season. It began at 6:30 p.m. PST and aired on ESPN. The game was sponsored by the San Diego County Credit Union and was officially known as the San Diego County Credit Union Poinsettia Bowl. Utah State defeated Northern Illinois by a score of 21–14.

The Aggies accepted their invitation after finishing with an 8–5 record after losing in the 2013 Mountain West Championship Game to Fresno State. The Huskies, meanwhile, went undefeated in the regular season and won the MAC West, but ultimately lost out to Bowling Green in the 2013 MAC Championship Game.

This was the second meeting between these two teams. The first was in 1995, when NIU traveled to Utah State and lost 42–7.

== Teams ==
In 2009, the Poinsettia Bowl announced that it had extended its agreement to continue to feature the Mountain West's second bowl-eligible team until at least 2013. The Huskies last played in this bowl game in 2006, where they lost to TCU 37–7.

== Game summary ==
=== First quarter ===
After receiving the opening kickoff, Utah State's (USU) opening drive stalled; however, their punt was downed inside the five yard line, forcing Northern Illinois (NIU) to drive the length of the field in order to score. NIU went three-and-out, and their punt went only 17 yards, giving USU the ball with only 29 yards needed to score a touchdown. They failed to do so, however, as, after losing six yards on the drive, Jake Thompson missed a 52-yard field goal attempt. Subsequently, NIU took possession of the ball, but quarterback Jordan Lynch lost a fumble, setting up USU, who this time capitalized on the field position with Nick Diaz making a 31-yard field goal to take a 3–0 lead. On NIU's ensuing drive, they ran 13 plays that totaled 55 yards, ultimately setting up a 37-yard field goal attempt for Mathew Sims. Sims missed, and USU regained possession. At the end of the first quarter, USU was in the middle of a drive, well into NIU territory.

=== Second quarter ===
At the beginning of the quarter, USU was at the NIU 25-yard line, having embarked, late in the first quarter, on a drive highlighted by a 58-yard rush by Joey DeMartino. Faced with another 3rd down and 16, USU failed to convert, and settled for another field goal by Diaz, this time a 39-yard kick. NIU finally responded, embarking on a 15-play, 78-yard drive that culminated when Lynch rushed for a 1-yard touchdown, making the score 7–6. After USU's next drive resulted in a punt, NIU took possession, and approached the red zone, but on a fourth down, failed to convert, consequently turning the ball over. USU failed to score before the half, and the score at the half was 7–6 NIU.

=== Third quarter ===
After receiving the opening half kickoff, NIU's first play of the half was an interception thrown by Lynch to USU's Brian Suite. The Aggies capitalized off the turnover; Darell Garretson threw a 5-yard touchdown pass to Brandon Swindall, and USU regained the lead, 13–7. NIU failed to respond, and punted; after that, the teams exchanged punts once again before USU drove down the field, and entered the red zone, at which point Garretson threw an interception to Jim Thorpe Award finalist Jimmie Ward. Again, however, NIU appeared to have failed to even achieve a first down, and brought on the punt team, but faked the punt, converting a fourth down and six as time in the third quarter expired. Entering the fourth quarter, NIU trailed by six, but had the ball around their own 30-yard line.

=== Fourth quarter ===
NIU's drive at the end of the third quarter carried over; however, when faced with another fourth down, they did not run another fake, and ultimately gave the ball back to USU. On USU's ensuing drive, with a 3rd down and 23 situation, Garretson tried a screen pass, but the pass was batted in the air, and ultimately intercepted by Ken Bishop. Despite a favorable field position, NIU could not muster a first down after taking over at the USU 13-yard line, and ultimately missed a 29-yard field goal, their second miss of the game. The score thus remained 13–7 as the Huskies failed to capitalize on the turnover and excellent field position. USU drove back down the field on their succeeding possession that lasted 17 plays and 80 yards, encapsulating 7:19, and scored on a DeMartino 1-yard touchdown run. Starting around their own 40-yard line, with just over four minutes remaining and no timeouts, NIU achieved two first downs before advancing into the red zone, at which point Lynch threw three consecutive incomplete passes into the end zone, before, on 4th down and 10, throwing a 15-yard touchdown pass to Juwan Brescacin with 1:44 remaining, pulling within seven points. Needing to attempt an onside kick, USU called a timeout to confer on strategy. When NIU ultimately made the kick, USU's Swindall recovered, and therefore USU was able to simply take a knee to finish the game, winning 21–14.

=== Scoring summary ===
Scoring summary

Quarter	Time	Drive			Team	Scoring information	Score	
Quarter	Time	Plays	Yards	TOP	Team	Scoring information	Utah State	Northern Illinois
1	6:56	8	32	3:23	USU	31-yard field goal by Nick Diaz	3	0
2	14:09	6	58	2:34	USU	39-yard field goal by Diaz	6	0
2	8:17	15	78	5:52	NIU	Jordan Lynch 1-yard touchdown run, Mathew Sims kick good	6	7
3	11:57	7	31	2:51	USU	Brandon Swindall 5-yard touchdown reception from Darell Garretson, Diaz kick good	13	7
4	4:14	17	80	7:19	USU	Joey DeMartino 1-yard touchdown run, 2-point pass good	21	7
4	1:44	13	57	2:30	NIU	Juwan Brescacin 15-yard touchdown reception from Lynch, Sims kick good	21	14
"TOP" = time of possession. For other American football terms, see Glossary of American football.							21	14

=== Statistics ===
Statistics	Utah St.	N. Illinois
First downs	17	19
Total offense, plays - yards	289	315
Rushes-yards (net)	168	99
Passing yards (net)	121	216
Passes, Comp-Att-Int	17-28-2	20-35-1
Time of Possession	32:21	27:39
