= 2014 GoDaddy Bowl =

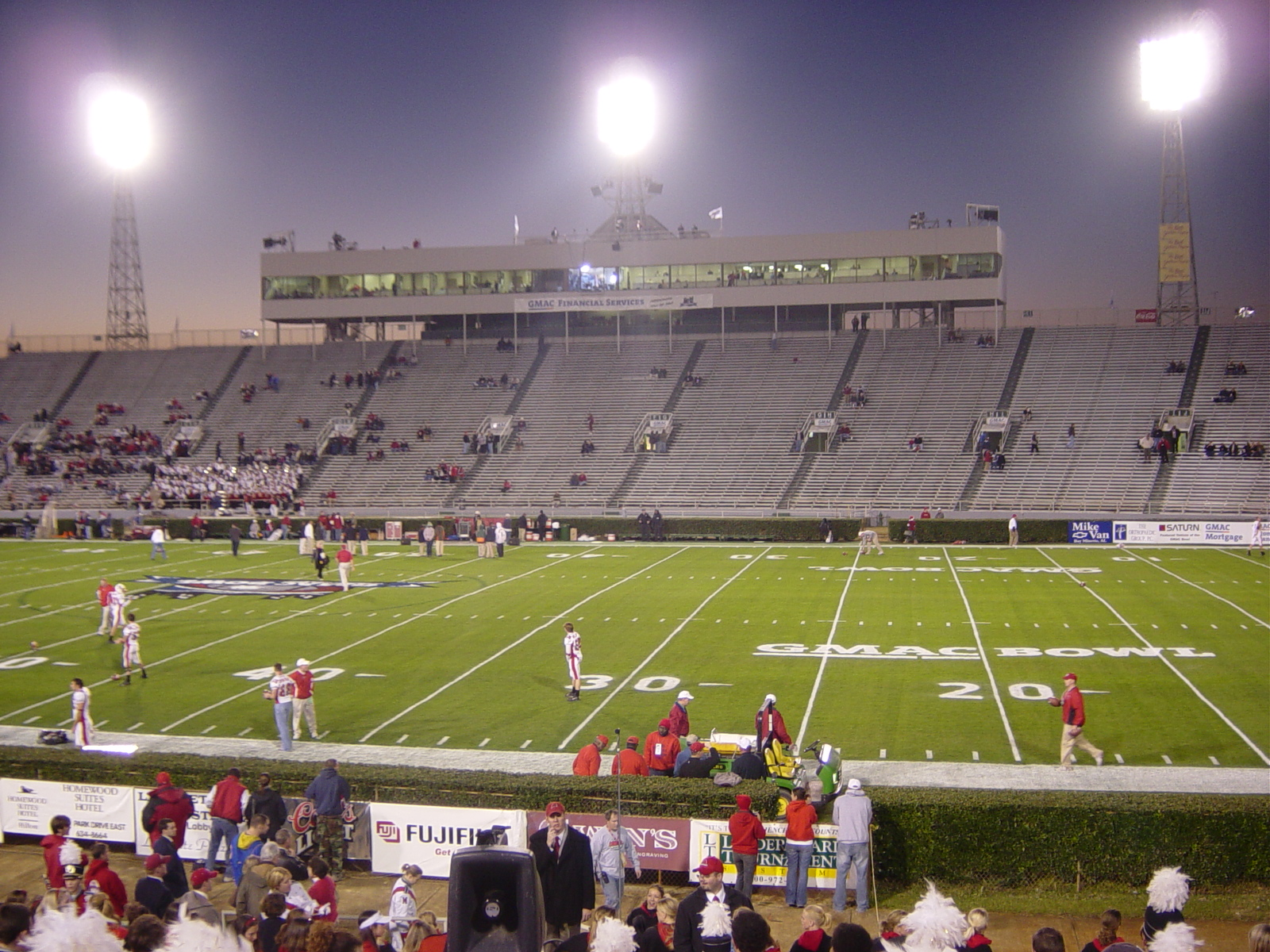
- The game took place at Ladd–Peebles Stadium in Mobile, Alabama
Arkansas State Red Wolves	Ball State Cardinals
(7–5)	(10–2)
Sun Belt	MAC
23	20
Head coach: John Thompson (interim)	Head coach: Pete Lembo
	1	2	3	4	Total
Arkansas State	0	10	6	7	23
Ball State	7	3	0	10	20
- Date: January 5, 2014
- Season: 2013
- Stadium: Ladd–Peebles Stadium
- Location: Mobile, Alabama
- Favorite: Ball St. by 9.5
- Referee: Marc Curles (SEC)
- Attendance: 36,119
- Payout: US$1.5 million combined

United States TV coverage
- Network: ESPN
- Announcers: Carter Blackburn, Danny Kanell and Allison Williams

The 2014 GoDaddy Bowl was an American college football bowl game that was played on January 5, 2014, at the Ladd–Peebles Stadium in Mobile, Alabama. The fifteenth edition of the GoDaddy Bowl (originally known as the Mobile Alabama Bowl), it featured the Ball State Cardinals from the Mid-American Conference and the Arkansas State Red Wolves, co-champions of the Sun Belt Conference. It was one of the 2013–14 bowl games that concluded the 2013 FBS football season. The game began at 8:00 p.m. CST and aired on ESPN. It was sponsored by web hosting service company Go Daddy. Arkansas State defeated Ball State by a score of 23–20.

The Cardinals, who earned a 10–2 record during the season, made their second appearance in the bowl, while the Red Wolves, who earned a 7–5 record during the season, made their third consecutive appearance in the bowl. The pregame buildup focused on the teams' respective strong offenses. For Ball State, the passing game centered on quarterback Keith Wenning connecting with wide receiver Willie Snead. In tandem with the rushing attack fueled by a strong offensive line, one writer asserted that they would enjoy "easy pickings" against a mediocre Arkansas State defense. Unlike the Ball State offense, Arkansas State's offense focused predominantly on the rushing attack, to which both dual-threat quarterback Adam Kennedy and running back Michael Gordon contributed. Ball State's defense was average in terms of points allowed, but poor in terms of yards allowed. Ball State was a 9.5 point favorite to win the game, and was the predicted winner among most sportswriters.

Ball State jumped out to an early lead via a Wenning to Snead touchdown, and led at the end of the first quarter 7–0. After the first quarter, due to Kennedy's ineffectiveness, Fredi Knighten took over at quarterback for Arkansas State, and in the second quarter, helped the team score 10 points while Ball State scored only 3 – at half time, the teams were tied at 10. Arkansas State made two field goals in the third quarter, thus entering the fourth with a six-point lead. However, Ball State scored via a field goal early in the quarter, and a touchdown with less than two minutes to play to retake the lead. Arkansas State promptly responded via a touchdown pass. Although Ball State was able to move the ball into field goal range as time waned, their field goal try was blocked, and ultimately Arkansas State held onto win the game, 23–20.

== Teams ==
The game featured the Ball State Cardinals against the Arkansas State Red Wolves.

=== Ball State Cardinals ===
The Cardinals continued their recent winning ways in 2013, finishing the season with a 7–1 conference and 10–2 overall record, good for second place in the MAC's West Division. They won their first two games before losing to North Texas. After that, they won seven consecutive games before losing in their only game against a ranked opponent, Northern Illinois on November 13. They won their final game, at which point bowl director Jerry Silverstein extended an invitation to play in the game. This will be Ball State's second GoDaddy Bowl; they had previously appeared in the 2009 game (when it was known as the GMAC Bowl), losing to the Tulsa Golden Hurricane by a score of 45–13.

=== Arkansas State Red Wolves ===
The Red Wolves continued their recent winning ways in 2013, finishing the season with a 5–2 conference and a 7–5 overall record. After losing to the Western Kentucky Hilltoppers for the team's fifth loss of the season (and second in-conference), bowl director Jerry Silverstein extended an invitation to play in the game. This was the Red Wolves' third consecutive GoDaddy Bowl, making them the team with the most appearances in the game's history. The Red Wolves had previously lost the 2012 game to the Northern Illinois Huskies by a score of 38–20, and then won the 2013 game over the 25th ranked Kent State Golden Flashes by a score of 17–13. The Red Wolves began their season defeating Arkansas–Pine Bluff in a rout before being demoralized by Auburn. After winning a close game the following week against Troy in their conference opener, they lost two consecutive non-conference games. They split their next two games, but subsequently won four consecutive games before falling to Western Kentucky and being invited to the bowl.

Shortly after the end of the regular season, Red Wolves head coach Bryan Harsin left to take the head coaching position at Boise State, a program where he had served as an assistant from 2001 to 2010. Red Wolves defensive coordinator John Thompson was named as interim head coach for the bowl game. This is his second consecutive GoDaddy Bowl as interim head coach, as he served in that capacity for the 2013 game after Gus Malzahn left to become head coach at Auburn.

== Pregame buildup ==
Entering the game, Ball State was a 9.5 point favorite, and thus not surprisingly, they were favored to win by college football analysts, including all six of CBS Sports' analysts. One sports blog ranked the game as the game providing the "worst" entertainment value of the 2013–14 bowl season, however the game was predicted to be a shootout.

=== Ball State offense vs. Arkansas State defense ===
==== Matchup ====
The passing attack was predicted to have "easy pickings", particularly with the Keith Wenning to Willie Snead connection that had eclipsed 100 yards in all but three games, against Arkansas State's secondary, which struggled against the pass. Compounding the potential offensive success of Ball State was their strong offensive line play, against which Arkansas State would need to sack the quarterback, a category in which they ranked 63rd-best in the country.

==== Ball State offense ====
Coordinated by Rick Skrosky, who was in his third year, Ball State's offense ranked ninth in the country by averaging 333 passing yards per game, 78th in the country with 153.3 rushing yards per game, and 14th in the country with 40.1 points per game. "Stellar senior quarterback" Keith Wenning led the Cardinals' offense, and passed for a total of 3,933 yards for 34 touchdowns and just 6 interceptions, predominantly to two 1,000 yard receivers – junior Willie Snead, who caught 97 passes for 1,429 yards and 14 touchdowns, and sophomore Jordan Williams, who caught 68 passes for 1,016 yards and 10 touchdowns. Supplementing that duo was senior Jamill Smith, who caught 63 passes for 855 yards and 8 touchdowns, as well as fellow senior Zane Fakes, an academic All-American tight end, who caught 37 passes for 382 yards and 2 touchdowns. The receiving corps was plagued by injuries, with three receivers confirmed out for the game, as well as one questionable. Jahwan Edwards led the rushing attack with 964 yards and 13 touchdowns. Underclassmen Horactio Banks, who was out for the bowl game due to a knee injury, and Teddy Williamson rushed for 595 and 213 yards respectively. Junior kicker Scott Secor made 17 of his 21 field goal attempts, including a long of 47 yards, and made 58 of his 60 extra point attempts. After losing four of its five starters entering the season, Ball State's offensive line entered the year with right guard Jordan Hansel its only returnee; Hansel won first team All-MAC honors and center Jacob Richard achieved third team All-MAC honors.

==== Arkansas State defense ====
The Red Wolves' defense was led by defensive coordinator/linebackers coach John Thompson, who was in his second year with the program. They finished in the middle of the pack in both the NCAA and the conference in defensive statistical categories relating to yardage and points allowed. Anchored by nose tackle Ryan Carrethers, an NFL Draft prospect whose tackle totals moved him even higher up the radar (he was second on the team with 87 as well as four sacks and eight tackles for a loss (TFL)), the Arkansas State defensive line also featured redshirt sophomore defensive end Chris Stone, who led the defense with 9.5 TFL and added three sacks, and fifth-year senior Amos Draper. The linebacking corps was not a focal point of the defense – only two of the defense's top 15 tacklers were linebackers – the leader was undersized junior Qushaun Lee (5 feet 11 inches (1.80 m) 225 pounds (102 kg)), who led the defense with 119 tackles and added 6 TFL, and also contributing was freshman Xavier Woosdon, who recorded 22 total tackles. Making up for the lack of linebackers were a plethora of defensive backs who played key roles on the unit, including three of the top six tacklers – junior Sterling Young (70 tackles, 2 interceptions, 3 fumble recoveries), and sophomores Chris Humes (50 tackles, 3.5 TFL), and Rocky Hayes (42 tackles, team-leading 3 interceptions, 10 pass breakups, 2 TFL). Other key contributors included junior Artez Brown (37 tackles, 10 pass breakups, interception), freshman Money Hunter (35 tackles), and junior Andrew Tryon (28 tackles, 5 pass breakups).

=== Arkansas State offense vs. Ball State defense ===
==== Matchup ====
A key to this matchup was for Ball State to force Arkansas State quarterback Adam Kennedy to be one-dimensional, limiting his ability to run the football, and thus forcing him to pass, attacking the Cardinals' defensive strong point, their secondary. For Arkansas State, establishing a rushing attack early and utilizing it often was paramount, as Ball State did not defend against the run particularly well during the regular season, however at the same time, Arkansas State needed to limit turnovers as they had all season (13 lost all season – seventh nationally); creating them was a strength for Ball State (30 created all season (including 10 in previous 4 games) – seventh nationally).

==== Arkansas State offense ====
Led by co-coordinators Eliah Drinkwitz (who predominantly focused on running backs) and Bush Hamdan (who predominantly focused on quarterbacks), Arkansas State's offense excelled in the running game, and averaged 206 rushing yards per game, which was second in the Sun Belt, but struggled in the passing game, averaging just 208 yards per game, which was sixth in the conference; the aggregate mediocrity of their offense manifested itself by averaging 29.7 points per game, fourth in the conference. Their offense was led by dual-threat quarterback Adam Kennedy, a transfer from Utah State who was in his first year as a Red Wolf. The senior totaled 2,349 passing yards, and added 514 rushing yards, second among Sun Belt quarterbacks and tied for ninth overall in the conference; he scored 15 total touchdowns (11 passing, 4 rushing). Leading Arkansas State's rushing attack, however, was sophomore Michael Gordon, a small back with a 5 feet 9 inches (1.75 m) 190 pounds (86 kg) stature, who amassed 717 yards (fifth in the conference) and ten touchdowns (tied for fourth in the conference). Also leading the running game were seniors David Oku (a transfer from Tennessee) and Sirgregory Thornton, who contributed 511 and 340 yards respectively. Augmenting the aforementioned were sophomores backup quarterback Fredi Knighten, who rushed for 247 yards, and wide receiver J. D. McKissic, who rushed 118 yards.

Leading the receiving game were senior big-play threat Julian Jones, who caught 51 passes for 630 yards and 4 touchdowns, and possession safety valve McKissic, who caught 73 receptions for 590 yards and 4 touchdowns. Augmenting the aforementioned duo were 6 feet 4 inches (1.93 m) senior Allen Muse, third on the team in receiving yards, and sophomore tight end Darion Griswold, fourth on the team in receiving. Gordon, Oku, and senior receiver R.J. Fleming also contributed in the receiving game. Senior Brian Davis handled the kicking game, and went 44/45 on extra points, and 12/14 kicking field goals (with a long of 50 yards) for a total of 80 points. The Wolves' offensive line struggled to protect the quarterback despite returning the majority of the unit from the 2012 season, but did manage to open holes for the running game. Starters on the offensive line included sophomore center Bryce Giddens, a preseason all-conference honoree, senior tackle Aaron Williams and freshman tackle Colton Jackson, as well as upperclassmen guards Alan Wright and Steve Haunga.

==== Ball State defense ====
Defensive coordinator Jay Bateman led the Cardinals' defense, which was in the middle of the pack in the FBS in terms of points allowed (24.8 per game), in the bottom half in terms of yards allowed (420.8 per game), particularly struggling against the running game, allowing 194.8 rushing yards per game, which was in the bottom third nationally. Ball State's defensive line was led by fifth-year senior defensive end Jonathan Newsome, who achieved first team All-MAC honors, and totaled 57 tackles, 11.5 TFL, and 8 sacks. Senior Nathan Ollie was also a leader of the line, earning second team All-MAC accolades, and totaling 67 tackles, 9 TFL, and 3 sacks on the season. Like Ollie (Newsome did not start the second game of the season), senior Joel Cox and junior Nick Miles started every game of the season, at nose tackle and defensive end respectively. Junior Ben Ingle started 11 of the 12 games at weak side linebacker, and led the defense with 105 tackles, including 3.5 TFL, redshirt freshman Zack Ryan, who started every game at middle linebacker, was third on the defense with 80 tackles, with 8 TFL and 2.5 sacks, and senior Kenneth Lee played strong side linebacker, and recorded 42 tackles, 4.5 TFL, and 2.5 sacks. Aside from junior Brian Jones, who started all 12 games and finished the season second on the defense with 90 tackles and led the defense with 4 fumble recoveries, continuity was lacking in the Cardinals' secondary – three different players started at the "BC" cornerback spot, two different players started at the "FC" cornerback spot, and two different players started at the free safety spot. Injuries also took their toll, with two defensive backs out for the bowl game.

== Game summary ==
=== First quarter ===
After receiving the opening kickoff, Ball State's first drive stalled, and it ultimately went three-and-out. Their punter, Kyle Schmidt, managed only 24 yards on the punt, and gave Arkansas State the ball at Ball State's 36-yard line. Arkansas State failed to capitalize on the good field position, however, missing a 34-yard field goal attempt. Subsequently, the teams exchanged punts. After being pinned at their own 11-yard line, the Cardinals embarked on a 14-play, 89-yard drive that featured six rushes by Jahwan Edwards for a total of 44 yards, including one 22-yard rush. Also on the drive, Keith Wenning completed four of five passes, three of which were to Willie Snead, including a 9-yard touchdown pass that was the first score of the game. At the end of the quarter, the Red Wolves had just concluded a drive, that had crossed into Ball State's territory before a punt that was downed inside the 5-yard line. On that drive, Fredi Knighten replaced Adam Kennedy at quarterback.

=== Second quarter ===
The victim of poor field position, Ball State executed only three plays, the last of which was a sack that pinned them at their own 1-yard line. Nevertheless, Schmidt was able to punt the ball 52 yards, but a 10-yard return still gave Arkansas State the ball in Ball State's territory. They got on the score board on that drive via a 41-yard field goal kick by Brian Davis, making the score 7–3 Ball State. On their ensuing drive, Ball State executed another extended drive, this one lasting 13 plays and totaling 67 yards (highlighted by another 20+ yard rush by Edwards); it failed to reach the end zone, but all was not lost, as Scott Secor made a 26-yard field goal to put the Cardinals up by seven points. The drive encompassed 6:09. Arkansas State responded, embarking on a 9-play, 63-yard drive that was highlighted by a 27-yard rush by R.J. Fleming, and climaxed when Sirgregory Thornton rushed for a 1-yard touchdown, tying the game in the waning seconds of the first half. The half time score was 10–10.

=== Third quarter ===
Arkansas State got the ball to start the second half, and promptly drove down the field relying predominantly on Knighten, who threw six passes and attempted three rushes; ultimately, their drive stalled at the 2-yard line, and Davis kicked an 18-yard field goal to put the Red Wolves atop 13–10. Ball State subsequently faced a fourth down and one (4th and 1) situation, on which they attempted a fake punt – Schmidt was tackled by Brock Barnhill on the play and lost three yards on the rush, and the Cardinals had to relinquish the ball in their own territory. Arkansas State took advantage of the field position, converting another field goal attempt, this one from 29 yards, to give them a 6-point lead. Once again, Ball State turned the ball over on downs on their ensuing possession, this time doing so at the Arkansas State 32-yard line. This time, Arkansas State failed to take advantage, punting after achieving only one first down. At the end of the quarter, Ball State was in the midst of a possession around their 25-yard line.

=== Fourth quarter ===
Ball State took advantage of a pass interference penalty on Arkansas State on their drive – Secor kicked a 37-yard field goal to pull the Cardinals within three points. The Red Wolves then went three-and-out. After that, each team's quarterback (Wenning and Knighten respectively) threw interceptions; after the interceptions, Ball State had the ball at their own 4-yard line (Wenning's interception was returned to the 8-yard line). They scored after executing a demoralizing 16-play, 80-yard drive that encapsulated 6:51 – it culminated when Edwards rushed for a 1-yard touchdown. Arkansas State efficiently responded, scoring on a 13-yard pass from Knighten to Allen Muse, a 6 feet 4 inches (1.93 m), 225 pounds (102 kg) senior wide receiver. The touchdown gave Arkansas State a 23–20 lead that they would not relinquish – Secor attempted a 38-yard field goal as time expired to try to tie the game, however the kick was blocked, and the Red Wolves held on to win.

=== Broadcast ===
The game was broadcast multilaterally, across a variety of platforms, both radio and television. ESPN broadcast the game on television, with Carter Blackburn handling play-by-play, Danny Kanell facilitating analysis, and Allison Williams reporting from the sidelines. Several radio stations were set to broadcast the game, including Ball State student radio WCRD, which featured Tyler Bradfield doing play-by-play and Sean Stewart as the analyst, and Ball State's flagship radio station WLBC-FM, which featured a four-person crew – Joel Gedett (play-by-play), Mark O'Connell (analyst), Luke Martin (sidelines), and Jeff Weiler (host). The GoDaddy Bowl Radio Network was also set to broadcast the game on over 400 affiliated radio stations, as well as SiriusXM. For that broadcast Mike Grace handled play-by-play duties and served as executive producer, Jay Roberson served as the analyst, and Randy Burgan reported from the sidelines.

=== Scoring summary ===
Scoring summary

Quarter	Time	Drive			Team	Scoring information	Score	
Quarter	Time	Plays	Yards	TOP	Team	Scoring information	Arkansas State	Ball State
1	3:07	14	89	6:37	BALL	Willie Snead 9-yard touchdown reception from Keith Wenning, Scott Secor kick good	0	7
2	10:18	5	20	2:31	ARST	41-yard field goal by Brian Davis	3	7
2	4:09	13	67	6:09	BALL	26-yard field goal by Scott Secor	3	10
2	0:48	9	63	3:21	ARST	Sirgregory Thornton 1-yard touchdown run, Brian Davis kick good	10	10
3	10:45	12	63	4:15	ARST	18-yard field goal by Brian Davis	13	10
3	7:21	7	18	2:29	ARST	29-yard field goal by Brian Davis	16	10
4	12:58	11	72	3:41	BALL	37-yard field goal by Scott Secor	16	13
4	1:33	16	80	6:51	BALL	Jahwan Edwards 1-yard touchdown run, Scott Secor kick good	16	20
4	0:32	5	59	1:01	ARST	Allen Muse 13-yard touchdown reception from Fredi Knighten, Brian Davis kick good	23	20
"TOP" = time of possession. For other American football terms, see Glossary of American football.							23	20

=== Statistics ===
==== Team statistics ====
Statistics	Arkansas State	Ball State
First downs	17	27
Total offense, plays – yards	65–331	83–363
Rushes-yards (net)	202	148
Passing yards (net)	129	215
Passes, Comp-Att-Int	18–26–1	23–44–1
Time of Possession	26:36	33:24

==== Individual statistics ====
===== Passing =====
Team	Name	Completions	Attempts	Yards	Touchdowns	Interceptions
ASU	Fredi Knighten	15	20	115	1	1
ASU	Adam Kennedy	3	5	14	0	0
BSU	Keith Wenning	23	44	215	1	1

===== Rushing =====
Team	Name	Rushes	Yards	Average	Touchdowns	Long
ASU	Knighten	19	97	5.1	0	15
ASU	Michael Gordon	6	37	6.2	0	15
ASU	Kennedy	6	10	1.7	0	7
ASU	Sirgregory Thornton	3	14	4.7	1	12
BSU	Jahwan Edwards	28	146	5.2	1	22
BSU	Teddy Williamson	3	14	4.7	0	7
BSU	Wenning	5	−1	−0.2	0	12

===== Receiving =====
Team	Name	Receptions	Yards	Average	Touchdowns	Long
ASU	J. D. McKissic	9	72	8.0	0	26
ASU	Allen Muse	3	14	4.7	1	13
ASU	R. J. Fleming	2	13	6.5	0	9
ASU	Julian Jones	1	11	11.0	0	11
ASU	Darian Griswold	1	11	11.0	0	11
BSU	Willie Snead	9	87	9.7	1	25
BSU	Jamill Smith	4	56	14.0	0	18
BSU	Jordan Williams	4	34	8.5	0	10
BSU	Zane Fakes	4	28	7.0	0	9
BSU	Dylan Curry	2	10	5.0	0	5

Box Score from ESPN, Retrieved April 2, 2014
