= 2013 Ohio Bobcats football team =

American college football season

2013 Ohio Bobcats football

Beef 'O' Brady's Bowl, L 20–37 vs. East Carolina
- Conference: Mid-American Conference
- East Division
- Record: 7–6 (4–4 MAC)
- Head coach: Frank Solich (9th season)
- Offensive coordinator: Tim Albin (9th season)
- Offensive scheme: Spread option
- Defensive coordinator: Jim Burrow (9th season)
- Base defense: 4–3
- Home stadium: Peden Stadium

2013 Mid-American Conference football standings
	Conf.			Overall
Team	W		L	W		L
East Division
Bowling Green x$	7	–	1	10	–	4
Buffalo	6	–	2	8	–	5
Ohio	4	–	4	7	–	6
Akron	4	–	4	5	–	7
Kent State	3	–	5	4	–	8
UMass	1	–	7	1	–	11
Miami (OH)	0	–	8	0	–	12
West Division
Northern Illinois x	8	–	0	12	–	2
Ball State	7	–	1	10	–	3
Toledo	5	–	3	7	–	5
Central Michigan	5	–	3	6	–	6
Eastern Michigan	1	–	7	2	–	10
Western Michigan	1	–	7	1	–	11
Championship: Bowling Green 47, Northern Illinois 27
$ – Conference champion; x – Division champion/co-champions

The 2013 Ohio Bobcats football team represented Ohio University in the 2013 NCAA Division I FBS football season. They were led by ninth-year head coach Frank Solich and played their home games at Peden Stadium. They are a member of the East Division of the Mid-American Conference (MAC). They finished the season 7–6, 4–4 in MAC play to finish in a tie for third place in the East Division. They were invited to the Beef 'O' Brady's Bowl where they lost to East Carolina.

== Schedule ==
Date	Time	Opponent	Site	TV	Result	Attendance
September 1	3:30 p.m.	at No. 9 Louisville*	Papa John's Cardinal Stadium; Louisville, KY	ESPN	L 7–49	55,332
September 7	7:00 p.m.	North Texas*	Peden Stadium; Athens, OH	ESPN3	W 27–21	24,511
September 14	8:00 p.m.	Marshall*	Peden Stadium; Athens, OH (Battle for the Bell)	ESPNews	W 34–31	24,836
September 21	2:00 p.m.	Austin Peay*	Peden Stadium; Athens, OH	ESPN3	W 38–0	19,547
October 5	2:00 p.m.	at Akron	InfoCision Stadium; Akron, OH	ESPN3	W 43–3	19,775
October 12	2:00 p.m.	Central Michigan	Peden Stadium; Athens, OH	TWCSC	L 23–26	23,826
October 19	1:00 p.m.	at Eastern Michigan	Rynearson Stadium; Ypsilanti, MI	ESPN3	W 56–28	3,257
October 26	2:00 p.m.	Miami (OH)	Peden Stadium; Athens, OH (Battle of the Bricks)	ESPN3	W 41–16	21,638
November 5	8:00 p.m.	at Buffalo	University at Buffalo Stadium; Amherst, NY	ESPN2	L 3–30	22,918
November 12	7:30 p.m.	at Bowling Green	Doyt Perry Stadium; Bowling Green, OH	ESPN3	L 0–49	8,527
November 19	8:00 p.m.	Kent State	Peden Stadium; Athens, OH	ESPN2	L 13–44	17,181
November 29	2:00 p.m.	UMass	Peden Stadium; Athens, OH	ESPN3	W 51–23	13,162
December 23	2:00 p.m.	vs. East Carolina*	Tropicana Field; St. Petersburg, FL (Beef 'O' Brady's Bowl)	ESPN	L 20–37	20,053
*Non-conference game; Rankings from AP Poll released prior to the game; All times are in Eastern time

- Source: Schedule

== Awards ==
Devin Bass

- All-MAC First Team Kickoff Return Specialist
- All-MAC Second Team Defensive Back
- 1x MAC East Division Defensive Player of the Week (Week 3)

Travis Carrie

- All-MAC First Team Punt Return Specialist
- All-MAC Third Team Defensive Back

Donte Foster

- All-MAC Second Team Wide Receiver

Thad Ingol

- 1x MAC East Division Defensive Player of the Week (Week 6)

Jovon Johnson

- 1x MAC East Division Defensive Player of the Week (Week 2)

Tyler Tettleton

- 1x MAC East Division Offensive Player of the Week (Week 8)

Josiah Yazdani

- All-MAC Second Team Placekicker
- 1x MAC East Division Special Teams Player of the Week (Week 9)
