= 2013 Ball State Cardinals football team =

American college football season

2013 Ball State Cardinals football

GoDaddy Bowl, L 20–23 vs. Arkansas State
- Conference: Mid-American Conference
- West Division
- Record: 10–3 (7–1 MAC)
- Head coach: Pete Lembo (3rd season)
- Offensive coordinator: Rich Skrosky (3rd season)
- Offensive scheme: Multiple
- Defensive coordinator: Jay Bateman (3rd season)
- Base defense: 3–4
- Home stadium: Scheumann Stadium

2013 Mid-American Conference football standings
	Conf.			Overall
Team	W		L	W		L
East Division
Bowling Green x$	7	–	1	10	–	4
Buffalo	6	–	2	8	–	5
Ohio	4	–	4	7	–	6
Akron	4	–	4	5	–	7
Kent State	3	–	5	4	–	8
UMass	1	–	7	1	–	11
Miami (OH)	0	–	8	0	–	12
West Division
Northern Illinois x	8	–	0	12	–	2
Ball State	7	–	1	10	–	3
Toledo	5	–	3	7	–	5
Central Michigan	5	–	3	6	–	6
Eastern Michigan	1	–	7	2	–	10
Western Michigan	1	–	7	1	–	11
Championship: Bowling Green 47, Northern Illinois 27
$ – Conference champion; x – Division champion/co-champions

The 2013 Ball State Cardinals football team represented Ball State University in the 2013 NCAA Division I FBS football season. They were led by third-year head coach Pete Lembo and played their home games at Scheumann Stadium. They were a member of the West Division of the Mid-American Conference. They finished the season 10–3, 7–1 in MAC play to finish in second place in the West Division. They were invited to the GoDaddy Bowl where they lost to Arkansas State.

== Schedule ==
Date	Time	Opponent	Site	TV	Result	Attendance
August 29	7:00 pm	No. 13 (FCS) Illinois State*	Scheumann Stadium; Muncie, IN	ESPN3	W 51–28	16,327
September 7	1:00 pm	Army*	Scheumann Stadium; Muncie, IN	ESPN3	W 40–14	15,106
September 14	4:00 pm	at North Texas*	Apogee Stadium; Denton, TX	FSN	L 27–34	14,747
September 21	1:00 pm	at Eastern Michigan	Rynearson Stadium; Ypsilanti, MI	ESPN3	W 51–20	5,402
September 28	3:00 pm	Toledo	Scheumann Stadium; Muncie, IN	ESPN3	W 31–24	18,329
October 5	12:00 pm	at Virginia*	Scott Stadium; Charlottesville, VA	ACCRSN	W 48–27	38,228
October 12	3:00 pm	Kent State^{†}	Scheumann Stadium; Muncie, IN	ESPN3	W 27–24	16,861
October 19	2:00 pm	at Western Michigan	Waldo Stadium; Kalamazoo, MI		W 38–17	10,274
October 26	12:00 pm	at Akron	InfoCision Stadium; Akron, OH	ESPN+	W 42–24	16,119
November 6	8:00 pm	Central Michigan	Scheumann Stadium; Munice, IN	ESPN2	W 44–24	9,494
November 13	8:00 pm	at No. 20 Northern Illinois	Huskie Stadium; DeKalb, IL (Battle for the Bronze Stalk)	ESPN2	L 27–48	18,290
November 29	1:00 pm	Miami (OH)	Scheumann Stadium; Munice, IN	ESPN3	W 55–14	6,784
January 5	9:00 pm	vs. Arkansas State*	Ladd–Peebles Stadium; Mobile, AL (GoDaddy Bowl)	ESPN	L 20–23	36,119
*Non-conference game; ^{†}Homecoming; Rankings from Coaches' Poll released prior to the game; All times are in Eastern time

== Game summaries ==
=== Illinois State ===
Illinois State at Ball State

Team	1	2	3	4	Total
Redbirds	14	7	0	7	28
• Cardinals	9	7	21	14	51

- Date: August 29
- Location: Scheumann Stadium
  Muncie, IN
- Game start: 7:00 EST
- Game attendance: 16,327
- Television network: ESPN3

=== Army ===
Army at Ball State

Team	1	2	3	4	Total
Black Knights	7	0	7	0	14
• Cardinals	14	13	10	3	40

- Date: September 7
- Location: Scheumann Stadium
  Muncie, IN
- Game attendance: 15,106
- Television network: ESPN3

=== North Texas ===
Ball State at North Texas

Team	1	2	3	4	Total
Cardinals	20	7	0	0	27
• Mean Green	3	13	8	10	34

- Date: September 14
- Location: Apogee Stadium
  Denton, TX
- Game start: 4:00 p.m. EST
- Game attendance: 14,747
- Game weather: Clear, 90 °F (32 °C)
- Referee: Mark Klucznski
- Television network: FSN
Sources: Box score

Statistics	BALL	UNT
First downs	19	31
Total yards	496	505
Rushing yards	163	231
Passing yards	333	274
Turnovers	5	1
Time of possession	22:24	37:36

Team	Category	Player	Statistics
Ball State	Passing	Keith Wenning	27/46, 333 yards, 2 TD, 2 INT
Ball State	Rushing	Horactio Banks	11 rushes, 141 yards, TD
Ball State	Receiving	Jamill Smith	4 receptions, 115 yards
North Texas	Passing	Derek Thompson	31/47, 274 yards, TD
North Texas	Rushing	Brandin Byrd	18 rushes, 79 yards
North Texas	Receiving	Brelan Chancellor	9 receptions, 88 yards, TD

=== Eastern Michigan ===
Ball State at Eastern Michigan

Team	1	2	3	4	Total
• Cardinals	27	7	17	0	51
Eagles	6	7	7	0	20

- Date: September 21
- Location: Rynearson Stadium
  Ypsilanti, MI
- Television network: ESPN3

=== Toledo ===
Toledo at Ball State

Team	1	2	3	4	Total
Rockets	10	0	0	14	24
• Cardinals	10	7	0	14	31

- Date: September 28
- Location: Scheumann Stadium
  Muncie, IN
- Television network: ESPN3

=== Virginia ===
Ball State at Virginia

Team	1	2	3	4	Total
• Cardinals	7	10	14	17	48
Cavaliers	10	7	7	3	27

- Date: October 5
- Location: Scott Stadium
  Charlottesville, VA
- Television network: FSN ESPN3

=== Kent State ===
Kent State at Ball State

Team	1	2	3	4	Total
Golden Flashes	7	0	7	10	24
• Cardinals	0	7	13	7	27

- Date: October 12
- Location: Scheumann Stadium
  Muncie, IN
- Television network: ESPN3

=== Western Michigan ===
Ball State at Western Michigan

Team	1	2	3	4	Total
• Cardinals	3	14	7	14	38
Broncos	3	0	0	14	17

- Date: October 19
- Location: Waldo Stadium
  Kalamazoo, MI
- Television network: ESPN3

=== Akron ===
Ball State at Akron

Team	1	2	3	4	Total
• Cardinals	14	14	7	7	42
Zips	3	7	7	7	24

- Date: October 26
- Location: InfoCision Stadium
  Akron, OH
- Television network: ESPN+

=== Central Michigan ===
Central Michigan at Ball State

Team	1	2	3	4	Total
Chippewas	0	3	7	14	24
• Cardinals	14	17	10	3	44

- Date: November 6
- Location: Scheumann Stadium
  Muncie, IN
- Television network: ESPN2

=== Northern Illinois ===
Ball State at Northern Illinois

Team	1	2	3	4	Total
Cardinals	7	17	3	0	27
• #20 Huskies	3	17	7	21	48

- Date: November 13
- Location: Huskie Stadium
  DeKalb, IL
- Television network: ESPN2 or ESPNU

=== Miami (OH) ===
Miami (OH) at Ball State

Team	1	2	3	4	Total
RedHawks	0	0	0	0	0
Cardinals	0	0	0	0	0

- Date: November 29
- Location: Scheumann Stadium
  Muncie, IN
- Television network: ESPNU or ESPN3

=== Arkansas State-GoDaddy Bowl ===
GoDaddy Bowl

Team	1	2	3	4	Total
• Arkansas	0	10	6	7	23
Cardinals	7	3	0	10	20

- Date: January 5
- Location: Ladd–Peebles Stadium
  Mobile, AL
- Game start: 8:00 CST
- Television network: ESPN
