= 2013 Central Michigan Chippewas football team =

American college football season

2013 Central Michigan Chippewas football
- Conference: Mid-American Conference
- West Division
- Record: 6–6 (5–3 MAC)
- Head coach: Dan Enos (4th season)
- Offensive coordinator: Mike Cummings (4th season)
- Defensive coordinator: Joe Tumpkin (4th season)
- Home stadium: Kelly/Shorts Stadium

2013 Mid-American Conference football standings
	Conf.			Overall
Team	W		L	W		L
East Division
Bowling Green x$	7	–	1	10	–	4
Buffalo	6	–	2	8	–	5
Ohio	4	–	4	7	–	6
Akron	4	–	4	5	–	7
Kent State	3	–	5	4	–	8
UMass	1	–	7	1	–	11
Miami (OH)	0	–	8	0	–	12
West Division
Northern Illinois x	8	–	0	12	–	2
Ball State	7	–	1	10	–	3
Toledo	5	–	3	7	–	5
Central Michigan	5	–	3	6	–	6
Eastern Michigan	1	–	7	2	–	10
Western Michigan	1	–	7	1	–	11
Championship: Bowling Green 47, Northern Illinois 27
$ – Conference champion; x – Division champion/co-champions

The 2013 Central Michigan Chippewas football team represented Central Michigan University in the 2013 NCAA Division I FBS football season. They were led by fourth-year head coach Dan Enos and played their home games at Kelly/Shorts Stadium. They were a member of the West Division of the Mid-American Conference. They finished the season 6–6, 5–3 in MAC play to finish in a tie for third place in the West Division. Despite being bowl eligible, they were not invited to a bowl game.

== Schedule ==
Date	Time	Opponent	Site	TV	Result	Attendance
August 31	3:30 pm	at No. 17 Michigan*	Michigan Stadium; Ann Arbor, MI	BTN	L 9–59	112,618
September 7	3:00 pm	No. 11 (FCS) New Hampshire*	Kelly/Shorts Stadium; Mount Pleasant, MI	ESPN3	W 24–21	18,210
September 14	9:00 pm	at UNLV*	Sam Boyd Stadium; Whitney, NV	MWN	L 21–31	10,981
September 21	12:00 pm	Toledo	Kelly/Shorts Stadium; Mount Pleasant, MI	ESPN+	L 17–38	15,136
September 28	3:30 pm	at NC State*	Carter–Finley Stadium; Raleigh, NC	ESPN3	L 14–48	56,728
October 5	1:00 pm	at Miami (OH)	Yager Stadium; Oxford, OH	ESPN3	W 21–9	22,750
October 12	2:00 pm	at Ohio	Peden Stadium; Athens, OH	TWCSC	W 26–23	23,826
October 19	3:00 pm	No. 23 Northern Illinois^{†}	Kelly/Shorts Stadium; Mount Pleasant, MI	ESPN3	L 17–38	18,796
November 6	8:00 pm	at Ball State	Scheumann Stadium; Muncie, IN	ESPN2	L 24–44	9,494
November 16	12:00 pm	at Western Michigan	Waldo Stadium; Kalamazoo, MI (rivalry)	ESPN+	W 27–22	22,071
November 23	1:00 pm	UMass	Kelly/Shorts Stadium; Mount Pleasant, MI	ESPN3	W 37–0	8,763
November 29	2:00 pm	Eastern Michigan	Kelly/Shorts Stadium; Mount Pleasant, MI (rivalry)	ESPN3	W 42–10	5,214
*Non-conference game; ^{†}Homecoming; Rankings from AP Poll released prior to the game; All times are in Eastern time

== Game summaries ==
=== Michigan ===
Central Michigan at Michigan

Team	1	2	3	4	Total
Chippewas	3	3	0	3	9
• #17 Wolverines	14	21	21	3	59

- Date: August 31
- Location: Michigan Stadium
  Ann Arbor, MI
- Game attendance: 112,618
- Television network: BTN

=== New Hampshire ===
New Hampshire at Central Michigan

Team	1	2	3	4	Total
#11 (FCS) Wildcats	6	7	0	8	21
• Chippewas	0	0	7	17	24

- Date: September 7
- Location: Kelly/Shorts Stadium
  Mount Pleasant, MI
- Game start: 3:00 p.m. EST
- Game attendance: 18,210
- Television network: ESPN3

=== UNLV ===
Central Michigan at UNLV

Team	1	2	3	4	Total
Chippewas	7	14	0	0	21
• Rebels	0	7	14	10	31

- Date: September 14
- Location: Sam Boyd Stadium
  Paradise, NV
- Game start: 10:00 p.m. EST
- Game attendance: 10,981

=== Toledo ===
Toledo at Central Michigan

Team	1	2	3	4	Total
• Rockets	14	10	0	14	38
Chippewas	7	7	3	0	17

- Date: September 21
- Location: Kelly/Shorts Stadium
  Mount Pleasant, MI
- Television network: ESPN+

=== NC State ===
Central Michigan at NC State

Team	1	2	3	4	Total
Chippewas	0	0	0	14	14
• Wolfpack	7	28	3	10	48

- Date: September 28
- Location: Carter–Finley Stadium
  Raleigh, NC
- Game attendance: 56,728

=== Miami (OH) ===
Central Michigan at Miami (OH)

Team	1	2	3	4	Total
• Chippewas	0	7	7	7	21
RedHawks	3	0	6	0	9

- Date: October 5
- Location: Yager Stadium
  Oxford, OH
- Game attendance: 22,750

=== Ohio ===
Central Michigan at Ohio

Team	1	2	3	4	Total
• Chippewas	7	3	3	13	26
Bobcats	3	0	7	13	23

- Date: October 12
- Location: Peden Stadium
  Athens, OH
- Game attendance: 23,826

=== Northern Illinois ===
Northern Illinois at Central Michigan

Team	1	2	3	4	Total
• #23 Huskies	7	7	10	14	38
Chippewas	14	0	0	3	17

- Date: October 19
- Location: Kelly/Shorts Stadium
  Mount Pleasant, MI

=== Ball State ===
Central Michigan at Ball State

Team	1	2	3	4	Total
Chippewas	0	3	17	14	34
• Cardinals	14	17	10	3	44

- Date: November 6
- Location: Scheumann Stadium
  Muncie, IN
- Television network: ESPN2

=== Western Michigan ===
Central Michigan at Western Michigan

Team	1	2	3	4	Total
• Chippewas	14	0	14	0	28
Broncos	0	6	10	6	22

- Date: November 16
- Location: Waldo Stadium
  Kalamazoo, MI
- Television network: ESPN+

=== UMass ===
UMass at Central Michigan

Team	1	2	3	4	Total
Minutemen	0	0	0	0	0
• Chippewas	7	20	7	3	37

- Date: November 23
- Location: Kelly/Shorts Stadium
  Mount Pleasant, MI

=== Eastern Michigan ===
Eastern Michigan at Central Michigan

Team	1	2	3	4	Total
Eagles	0	10	0	0	10
• Chippewas	14	7	14	7	42

- Date: November 29
- Location: Kelly/Shorts Stadium
  Mount Pleasant, MI
- Television network: ESPNU or ESPN3
