= 2013 Western Michigan Broncos football team =

American college football season

2013 Western Michigan Broncos football
- Conference: Mid-American Conference
- West Division
- Record: 1–11 (1–7 MAC)
- Head coach: P. J. Fleck (1st season)
- Offensive coordinator: Kirk Ciarrocca (1st season)
- Offensive scheme: Spread
- Defensive coordinator: Ed Pinkham (1st season)
- Base defense: 4–3
- Home stadium: Waldo Stadium

2013 Mid-American Conference football standings
	Conf.			Overall
Team	W		L	W		L
East Division
Bowling Green x$	7	–	1	10	–	4
Buffalo	6	–	2	8	–	5
Ohio	4	–	4	7	–	6
Akron	4	–	4	5	–	7
Kent State	3	–	5	4	–	8
UMass	1	–	7	1	–	11
Miami (OH)	0	–	8	0	–	12
West Division
Northern Illinois x	8	–	0	12	–	2
Ball State	7	–	1	10	–	3
Toledo	5	–	3	7	–	5
Central Michigan	5	–	3	6	–	6
Eastern Michigan	1	–	7	2	–	10
Western Michigan	1	–	7	1	–	11
Championship: Bowling Green 47, Northern Illinois 27
$ – Conference champion; x – Division champion/co-champions

The 2013 Western Michigan Broncos football team represented Western Michigan University (WMU) in the 2013 NCAA Division I FBS football season. They were led by first-year head coach P. J. Fleck and played their home games at Waldo Stadium as a member of the West Division of the Mid-American Conference (MAC). In 2013, the Broncos finished at 1–11 (1–7 MAC), and last place in the MAC West division.

== Off-season ==
WMU was picked to finish fifth in the West division by members of the media.

The Broncos gained national notoriety during the offseason from Fleck, the youngest head coach in the NCAA Football Bowl Subdivision. Fleck introduced the "Row The Boat" theme, focusing on a group of people working together to reach a common goal. He participated in a "polar plunge" to raise money for Special Olympics and created a Harlem Shake video.

Holly Anderson of Sports Illustrated and Grantland chose WMU as the "MAC team you should root for". Deadspin posted an article commenting on a YouTube video WMU produced introducing new traditions that were planned for Broncos home games.

== Season ==
WMU started the season with eight consecutive losses before winning their first game. They fell to Michigan State University and Football Championship Subdivision (FCS) member Nicholls State University. Nicholls had won two games the previous two seasons. Both their wins came against National Association of Intercollegiate Athletics (NAIA) member Evangel College.

WMU finished the non-conference portion of the schedule losing to No. 17 Northwestern followed by a 59–3 blowout loss to Iowa. The Broncos then lost their first four MAC games.

Western Michigan defeated Massachusetts 31–30 in week nine of the season after Massachusetts failed to convert a two-point conversion with 22 seconds left in the game that would have given the Minutemen the lead.

The Broncos failed to win consecutive games losing to Eastern Michigan (EMU) 35–32 the following week in overtime. The loss occurred a day after EMU fired head coach Ron English. The loss also eliminated WMU from winning the Michigan MAC Trophy.

== Schedule ==
Date	Time	Opponent	Site	TV	Result	Attendance
August 30	8:00 pm	at Michigan State*	Spartan Stadium; East Lansing, MI	BTN	L 13–26	71,214
September 7	7:00 pm	Nicholls*	Waldo Stadium; Kalamazoo, MI	ESPN3	L 23–27	24,163
September 14	9:00 pm	at No. 17 Northwestern*	Ryan Field; Evanston, IL	BTN	L 17–38	33,128
September 21	Noon	at Iowa*	Kinnick Stadium; Iowa City, IA	BTN	L 3–59	66,886
September 28	7:00 pm	Kent State	Waldo Stadium; Kalamazoo, MI	ESPN3	L 14–32	15,503
October 5	3:00 pm	at Toledo	Glass Bowl; Toledo, OH	ESPN3	L 20–47	17,621
October 12	2:00 pm	Buffalo^{†}	Waldo Stadium; Kalamazoo, MI	ESPN3	L 0–33	14,722
October 19	2:00 pm	Ball State	Waldo Stadium; Kalamazoo, MI	ESPN3	L 17–38	10,274
October 26	3:00 pm	at Massachusetts	Gillette Stadium; Foxborough, MA	ESPN3	W 31–30	20,571
November 9	1:00 pm	at Eastern Michigan	Rynearson Stadium; Ypsilanti, MI (Michigan MAC Trophy)	ESPN3	L 32–35 ^{OT}	2,177
November 16	Noon	Central Michigan	Waldo Stadium; Kalamazoo, MI (WMU–CMU Rivalry Trophy, Michigan MAC Trophy)	ESPN Plus	L 22–27	22,071
November 26	7:00 pm	at No. 18 Northern Illinois	Huskie Stadium; DeKalb, IL	ESPN2	L 14–33	17,679
*Non-conference game; ^{†}Homecoming; Rankings from AP Poll released prior to the game; All times are in Eastern time

== Awards ==
=== Donald Celiscar ===
Junior defensive back Donald Celiscar was named the MAC West Division Defensive Player of the Week for Week 1. He had 10 tackles and two pass breakups in WMU's 26–13 loss to Michigan State.

=== Corey Davis ===
Freshman wide receiver Corey Davis was named to the Fred Biletnikoff Award watchlist after the third week of the season. Through five games, Davis has 16 receptions for 335 yards and two touchdowns.

=== Andrew Haldeman ===
Sophomore placekicker Andrew Haldeman was named the MAC West Division Special Teams Player of the Week for Week 9. Haldeman made a 36-yard field goal along with four extra points in the Broncos first win of the season, a 31–30 victory over Massachusetts.

=== J. Schroeder ===
Sophomore punter J. Schroeder received an honorable mention from the College Football Performance Awards for Week 1. He punted the ball 11 times (third most in the nation for the week) and had the 11th longest punt in the nation for the week. Schroeder was named 1 of 85 candidates for the 2013 Ray Guy Award.
