= 2013 Northern Illinois Huskies football team =

American college football season

2013 Northern Illinois Huskies football

MAC West Division champion

MAC Championship Game, L 27–47 vs. Bowling Green

Poinsettia Bowl, L 14–21 vs. Utah State
- Conference: Mid-American Conference
- West Division
- Record: 12–2 (8–0 MAC)
- Head coach: Rod Carey (1st season)
- Offensive coordinator: Bob Cole (1st season)
- Offensive scheme: Multiple
- Defensive coordinator: Jay Niemann (3rd season)
- Base defense: 4–3
- MVP: Jordan Lynch
- Captains: Jamaal Bass; Jared Volk; Jordan Lynch; Jimmie Ward
- Home stadium: Huskie Stadium

2013 Mid-American Conference football standings
	Conf.			Overall
Team	W		L	W		L
East Division
Bowling Green x$	7	–	1	10	–	4
Buffalo	6	–	2	8	–	5
Ohio	4	–	4	7	–	6
Akron	4	–	4	5	–	7
Kent State	3	–	5	4	–	8
UMass	1	–	7	1	–	11
Miami (OH)	0	–	8	0	–	12
West Division
Northern Illinois x	8	–	0	12	–	2
Ball State	7	–	1	10	–	3
Toledo	5	–	3	7	–	5
Central Michigan	5	–	3	6	–	6
Eastern Michigan	1	–	7	2	–	10
Western Michigan	1	–	7	1	–	11
Championship: Bowling Green 47, Northern Illinois 27
$ – Conference champion; x – Division champion/co-champions

The 2013 Northern Illinois Huskies football team represented Northern Illinois University as a West Division of the Mid-American Conference (MAC) member during the 2013 NCAA Division I FBS football season. Led by first-year head coach Rod Carey, the Huskies compiled an overall record of 12–2 with a mark of 8–0 In conference play, they won the MAC West Division title, and advanced to the MAC Championship Game, where they lost to East Division champion Bowling Green. Northern Illinois was invited to the Poinsettia Bowl, where they lost to Utah State. The team played home games at Huskie Stadium in DeKalb, Illinois.

Fresh off their Orange Bowl appearance the previous season, the Huskies went undefeated until the MAC Championship Game. This garnered national attention with the anticipation of another Bowl Championship Series (BCS) bowl appearance. Starting quarterback Jordan Lynch finished third in voting for the Heisman Trophy. The season marked the Huskies' sixth consecutive trip to a bowl game and their second consecutive bowl game loss.

== Schedule ==
Date	Time	Opponent	Rank	Site	TV	Result	Attendance	Source
August 31	2:30 p.m.	at Iowa*		Kinnick Stadium; Iowa City, IA	BTN	W 30–27	67,402	
September 14	4:00 p.m.	at Idaho*		Kibbie Dome; Moscow, ID		W 45–35	14,071	
September 21	6:00 p.m.	No. 8 (FCS) Eastern Illinois*		Huskie Stadium; DeKalb, IL	ESPN3	W 43–39	23,595	
September 28	11:00 a.m.	at Purdue*		Ross–Ade Stadium; West Lafayette, IN	ESPN2	W 55–24	54,258	
October 5	2:30 p.m.	at Kent State		Dix Stadium; Kent, OH	TWCS	W 38–24	18,773	
October 12	4:00 p.m.	Akron	No. 23	Huskie Stadium; DeKalb, IL	ESPN3	W 27–20	23,595	
October 19	2:00 p.m.	at Central Michigan	No. 23	Kelly/Shorts Stadium; Mount Pleasant, MI	ESPN3	W 38–17	18,796	
October 26	2:30 p.m.	Eastern Michigan	No. 23	Huskie Stadium; DeKalb, IL	CSNC	W 59–20	20,185	
November 2	11:00 a.m.	at Massachusetts	No. 21	Gillette Stadium; Foxborough, MA	ESPN Plus	W 63–19	10,061	
November 13	7:00 p.m.	Ball State	No. 20	Huskie Stadium; DeKalb, IL (Bronze Stalk Trophy)	ESPN2	W 48–27	18,290	
November 20	7:00 p.m.	at Toledo	No. 20	Glass Bowl; Toledo, OH	ESPN2	W 35–17	21,974	
November 26	6:00 p.m.	Western Michigan	No. 18	Huskie Stadium; DeKalb, IL	ESPN2	W 33–14	17,679	
December 6	7:00 p.m.	vs. Bowling Green*	No. 16	Ford Field; Detroit, MI (MAC Championship Game)	ESPN2	L 27–47	21,106	
December 26	8:30 p.m.	vs. Utah State*	No. 24	Qualcomm Stadium; San Diego, CA (Poinsettia Bowl)	ESPN	L 14–21	23,408	
*Non-conference game; Rankings from AP Poll released prior to the game; All times are in Central time

== Rankings ==
Ranking movements Legend: ██ Increase in ranking ██ Decrease in ranking RV = Received votes
	Week																
Poll	Pre	1	2	3	4	5	6	7	8	9	10	11	12	13	14	15	Final
AP	RV	RV	RV	RV	RV	RV	23	23	23	21	22	20	20	18	16	24	RV
Coaches	RV	RV	RV	RV	RV	23	23	23	22	20	20	21	21	20	18	23	RV
Harris	Not released							22	21	20	20	18	18	17	15	22	Not released
BCS	Not released								18	17	18	15	16	14	14	23	Not released

== Game summaries ==
=== Iowa ===
Northern Illinois at Iowa

Team	1	2	3	4	Total
• Huskies	10	7	3	10	30
Hawkeyes	7	17	0	3	27

- Date: August 31
- Location: Kinnick Stadium
  Iowa City, IA
- Game start: 2:42pm CST
- Elapsed time: 3:37
- Game attendance: 67,402
- Game weather: Temp: 85 • Wind: NE 7 • Weather: Sunny
- Referee: Dave Witvoet
- TV announcers (BTN): Paul Burmeister (play-by-play), Chuck Long (analyst) and Danan Hughes (analyst)

Scoring summary
1	7:33	Northern Illinois	Mathew Sims 47-yard field goal	Northern Illinois 3–0
1	3:47	Northern Illinois	Tommylee Lewis 40-yard pass from Jordan Lynch (Mathew Sims kick)	Northern Illinois 10–0
1	0:27	Iowa	Christian Kirksey 52-yard fumble recovery (Mike Meyer kick)	Northern Illinois 10–7
2	8:24	Iowa	Mike Meyer 28-yard field goal	Tied 10–10
2	6:32	Iowa	CJ Fiedorowicz 11-yard pass from Jake Rudock (Mike Meyer kick)	Iowa 17–10
2	3:49	Northern Illinois	Tommylee Lewis 21-yard pass from Jordan Lynch (Mathew Sims kick)	Tied 17–17
2	0:53	Iowa	Jake Rudock 6-yard run (Mike Meyer kick)	Iowa 24–17
3	1:13	Northern Illinois	Mathew Sims 25-yard field goal	Iowa 24–20
4	6:42	Iowa	Mike Meyer 44-yard field goal	Iowa 27–20
4	5:05	Northern Illinois	Da'Ron Brown 33-yard pass from Jordan Lynch (Mathew Sims kick)	Tied 27–27
4	0:04	Northern Illinois	Mathew Sims 36-yard field goal	Northern Illinois 30–27

Jordan Lynch threw for three touchdowns and ran for two more, as the team came away with their second win of the season.

=== Eastern Illinois ===
Eastern Illinois at Northern Illinois

Team	1	2	3	4	Total
#8 (FCS) Panthers	20	0	6	13	39
• Huskies	6	17	10	10	43

- Date: September 21
- Location: Huskie Stadium
  DeKalb, IL
- Game attendance: 23,595
- Referee: Mark Kluczynski,
- Television network: ESPN3

Scoring summary
1	12:21	Eastern Illinois	Erik Lora 14 Yd Pass From Jimmy Garoppolo (Two-Point Pass Conversion Failed)	Eastern Illinois 6–0
1	12:08	Eastern Illinois	Adam Drake 43 Yd Pass From Jimmy Garoppolo (Cameron Berra Kick)	Eastern Illinois 13–0
1	7:36	Eastern Illinois	Keiondre Gober 13 Yd Pass From Jimmy Garoppolo (Cameron Berra Kick)	Eastern Illinois 20–0
1	5:17	Northern Illinois	Cameron Stingily 5 Yd Run (Pat Failed)	Eastern Illinois 20–6
2	14:08	Northern Illinois	Cameron Stingily 5 Yd Run (Mathew Sims Kick)	Eastern Illinois 20–13
2	9:18	Northern Illinois	Luke Eakes 3 Yd Pass From Jordan Lynch (Mathew Sims Kick)	Tied 20–20
2	0:05	Northern Illinois	Mathew Sims 18 Yd	Northern Illinois 23–20
3	10:17	Northern Illinois	Keith Harris Jr. 9 Yd Run (Mathew Sims Kick)	Northern Illinois 30–20
3	7:45	Eastern Illinois	Erik Lora 33 Yd Pass From Jimmy Garoppolo (Two-Point Run Conversion Failed)	Northern Illinois 26–20
3	2:50	Northern Illinois	Mathew Sims 33 Yd	Northern Illinois 33–26
4	14:55	Eastern Illinois	Adam Drake 15 Yd Pass From Jimmy Garoppolo (Cameron Berra Kick)	Tied 33–33
4	11:24	Northern Illinois	Mathew Sims 37 Yd	Northern Illinois 36–33
4	9:53	Eastern Illinois	Erik Lora 10 Yd Pass From Jimmy Garoppolo (Pat Failed)	Eastern Illinois 39–36
4	8:25	Northern Illinois	Keith Harris Jr. 8 Yd Run (Mathew Sims Kick)	Northern Illinois 43–39

=== Kent State ===
Northern Illinois at Kent State

Team	1	2	3	4	Total
• Huskies	7	14	7	10	38
Golden Flashes	7	10	7	0	24

- Date: October 5
- Location: Dix Stadium
  Kent, OH
- Game attendance: 18,773
- Television network: TWCS

Scoring summary
1	10:37	Northern Illinois	Cameron Stingily 17 Yd Run (Mathew Sims Kick)	Northern Illinois 7–0
1	10:25	Kent State	Dri Archer 100 Yd Kickoff Return (Anthony Melchiori Kick)	Tied 7–7
2	6:16	Northern Illinois	Da'Ron Brown 53 Yd Pass From Jordan Lynch (Mathew Sims Kick)	Northern Illinois 14–7
2	5:19	Kent State	Dri Archer 66 Yd Pass From Colin Reardon (Anthony Melchiori Kick)	Tied 14–14
2	2:37	Northern Illinois	Cameron Stingily 1 Yd Run (Mathew Sims Kick)	Northern Illinois 21–14
2	0:20	Kent State	Anthony Melchiori 24 Yd	Northern Illinois 21–17
3	11:27	Kent State	Tyshon Goode 28 Yd Pass From Colin Reardon (Anthony Melchiori Kick)	Kent State 24–21
3	7:27	Northern Illinois	James Spencer 22 Yd Run (Mathew Sims Kick)	Northern Illinois 28–24
4	13:08	Northern Illinois	James Spencer 11 Yd Pass From Jordan Lynch (Mathew Sims Kick)	Northern Illinois 35–24
4	7:28	Northern Illinois	Mathew Sims 31 Yd	Northern Illinois 38–24

Cameron Stingily ran for a career-high 266 yards and two scores as Northern Illinois remained undefeated with a 38–24 win over Kent State.

=== Akron ===
Akron at Northern Illinois

Team	1	2	3	4	Total
Zips	14	0	0	6	20
• #23 Huskies	17	0	7	3	27

- Date: October 12
- Location: Huskie Stadium
  DeKalb, IL
- Game attendance: 23,595
- Television network: ESPN3

Scoring summary
1	11:04	Akron	Jawon Chisholm 1 Yd Run (Robert Stein Kick)	Akron 7–0
1	10:01	Northern Illinois	Jordan Lynch 18 Yd Run (Tyler Wedel Kick)	Tied 7–7
1	7:33	Northern Illinois	Tyler Wedel 42 Yd	Northern Illinois 10–7
1	4:52	Northern Illinois	Desroy Maxwell 25 Yd Pass From Jordan Lynch (Tyler Wedel Kick)	Northern Illinois 17–7
1	1:12	Akron	Jawon Chisholm 1 Yd Run (Robert Stein Kick)	Northern Illinois 17–14
3	11:37	Northern Illinois	Cameron Stingily 9 Yd Run (Tyler Wedel Kick)	Northern Illinois 24–14
4	11:19	Northern Illinois	Tyler Wedel 21 Yd	Northern Illinois 27–14
4	5:27	Akron	Tyrell Goodman 11 Yd Pass From Kyle Pohl (Pat Blocked)	Northern Illinois 27–20

The Huskies used their defense and kicking game to beat Akron 27–20 on Saturday night after the offense went 1 for 15 on third-down conversions.

=== Central Michigan ===
Northern Illinois at Central Michigan

Team	1	2	3	4	Total
• #23 Huskies	7	7	10	14	38
Chippewas	14	0	0	3	17

- Date: October 19
- Location: Kelly/Shorts Stadium
  Mount Pleasant, MI
- Game attendance: 18,796
- Television network: ESPN3

Scoring summary
1	6:05	Central Michigan	Titus Davis 9 Yd Pass From Cooper Rush (Ron Coluzzi Kick)	Central Michigan 7–0
1	2:05	Northern Illinois	Tommylee Lewis 9 Yd Pass From Jordan Lynch (Tyler Wedel Kick)	Tied 7–7
1	0:13	Central Michigan	Andrew Flory 36 Yd Pass From Cooper Rush (Ron Coluzzi Kick)	Central Michigan 14–7
2	8:11	Northern Illinois	Jordan Lynch 5 Yd Run (Tyler Wedel Kick)	Tied 14–14
3	11:01	Northern Illinois	Tyler Wedel 34 Yd	Northern Illinois 17–14
3	3:22	Northern Illinois	Jordan Lynch 1 Yd Run (Tyler Wedel Kick)	Northern Illinois 24–14
4	14:50	Central Michigan	Ron Coluzzi 38 Yd	Northern Illinois 24–17
4	6:11	Northern Illinois	Jordan Lynch 3 Yd Run (Tyler Wedel Kick)	Northern Illinois 31–17
4	1:32	Northern Illinois	Cameron Stingily 19 Yd Run (Tyler Wedel Kick)	Northern Illinois 38–17

Lynch had three rushing touchdowns and was 20 for 30 through the air for 155 yards and another score to help Northern Illinois (7–0, 3–0 Mid-American) extend the nation's best conference winning streak to 20 games. Lynch rushed for 316 yards, an FBS record for a quarterback, and the 23rd-ranked Huskies stayed unbeaten with a 38–17 victory at Central Michigan.

=== Eastern Michigan ===
Eastern Michigan at Northern Illinois

Team	1	2	3	4	Total
Eagles	3	0	10	7	20
• #23 Huskies	21	17	14	7	59

- Date: October 26
- Location: Huskie Stadium
  DeKalb, IL
- Game start: 2:35pm CST
- Game attendance: 20,185
- Television network: CSNC

Scoring summary
1	10:44	Northern Illinois	Da'Ron Brown 5 Yd Pass From Jordan Lynch (Mathew Sims Kick)	Northern Illinois 7–0
1	7:37	Northern Illinois	Joel Bouagnon 10 Yd Pass From Jordan Lynch (Mathew Sims Kick)	Northern Illinois 14–0
1	4:31	Northern Illinois	Jordan Lynch 30 Yd Run (Mathew Sims Kick)	Northern Illinois 21–0
1	1:01	Eastern Michigan	Dylan Mulder 25 Yd	Northern Illinois 21–3
2	11:58	Northern Illinois	Jordan Lynch 17 Yd Pass From Tommylee Lewis (Mathew Sims Kick)	Northern Illinois 28–3
2	2:08	Northern Illinois	Juwan Brescacin 16 Yd Pass From Jordan Lynch (Mathew Sims Kick)	Northern Illinois 35–3
2	0:00	Northern Illinois	Mathew Sims 28 Yd	Northern Illinois 38–3
3	9:54	Eastern Michigan	Dylan Mulder 32 Yd	Northern Illinois 38–6
3	8:11	Northern Illinois	Da'Ron Brown 28 Yd Pass From Jordan Lynch (Mathew Sims Kick)	Northern Illinois 45–6
3	6:33	Eastern Michigan	Tyreese Russell 9 Yd Pass From Tyler Benz (Dylan Mulder Kick)	Northern Illinois 45–13
3	4:55	Northern Illinois	Matt Williams 36 Yd Pass From Matt McIntosh (Mathew Sims Kick)	Northern Illinois 52–13
4	13:43	Northern Illinois	Ricky Connors 11 Yd Pass From Drew Hare (Mathew Sims Kick)	Northern Illinois 59–13
4	4:11	Eastern Michigan	Ryan Brumfield 5 Yd Run (Dylan Mulder Kick)	Northern Illinois 59–20

=== UMass ===
Northern Illinois at UMass

Team	1	2	3	4	Total
• #21 Huskies	21	21	7	14	63
Minutemen	6	7	6	0	19

- Date: November 2
- Location: Gillette Stadium
  Foxboro, MA
- Game start: 11:05am CST
- Elapsed time: 3:18
- Game attendance: 10,061
- Television network: ESPN+

Scoring summary
1	11:28	UMass	Brendon Levengood 42 Yd	UMass 3–0
1	8:03	Northern Illinois	Jordan Lynch 6 Yd Run (Mathew Sims Kick)	Northern Illinois 7–3
1	5:35	UMass	Brendon Levengood 46 Yd	Northern Illinois 7–6
1	4:16	Northern Illinois	Jordan Lynch 25 Yd Run (Mathew Sims Kick)	Northern Illinois 14–6
1	0:10	Northern Illinois	Jordan Lynch 19 Yd Run (Mathew Sims Kick)	Northern Illinois 21–6
2	14:09	Northern Illinois	Cameron Stingily 6 Yd Run (Mathew Sims Kick)	Northern Illinois 28–6
2	9:41	UMass	Lorenzo Woodley 1 Yd Run (Brendon Levengood Kick)	Northern Illinois 28–13
2	9:33	Northern Illinois	Juwan Brescacin 66 Yd Pass From Jordan Lynch (Mathew Sims Kick)	Northern Illinois 35–13
2	0:31	Northern Illinois	Tommylee Lewis 15 Yd Run (Mathew Sims Kick)	Northern Illinois 42–13
3	10:21	Northern Illinois	Jordan Lynch 11 Yd Run (Mathew Sims Kick)	Northern Illinois 49–13
3	6:03	UMass	Brendon Levengood 44 Yd	Northern Illinois 49–16
3	2:37	UMass	Brendon Levengood 40 Yd	Northern Illinois 49–19
4	9:02	Northern Illinois	Chad Beebe 81 Yd Pass From Drew Hare (Mathew Sims Kick)	Northern Illinois 56–19
4	5:31	Northern Illinois	Drew Hare 47 Yd Run (Mathew Sims Kick)	Northern Illinois 63–19

=== Ball State ===
Ball State at Northern Illinois

Team	1	2	3	4	Total
Cardinals	7	17	3	0	27
• #20 Huskies	3	17	7	21	48

- Date: November 13
- Location: Huskie Stadium
  DeKalb, IL
- Game attendance: 18,290
- Game weather: Temp: 32 • Weather: Overcast
- TV announcers (ESPN2): Bob Wischusen (play-by-play) and Desmond Howard (analyst)

Scoring summary
1	8:05	Northern Illinois	Mathew Sims 34 Yd	Northern Illinois 3–0
1	3:01	Ball State	Willie Snead 3 Yd Pass From Keith Wenning (Scott Secor Kick)	Ball State 7–3
2	13:53	Northern Illinois	Jordan Lynch 2 Yd Run (Mathew Sims Kick)	Northern Illinois 10–3
2	10:08	Ball State	Keith Wenning 1 Yd Run (Scott Secor Kick)	Ball State 14–10
2	5:00	Northern Illinois	Mathew Sims 20 Yd	Ball State 14–13
2	1:28	Ball State	Jahwan Edwards 5 Yd Run (Scott Secor Kick)	Ball State 21–13
2	1:13	Northern Illinois	Da'Ron Brown 58 Yd Pass From Jordan Lynch (Mathew Sims Kick)	Ball State 21–20
2	0:25	Ball State	Scott Secor 43 Yd	Ball State 24–20
3	8:31	Northern Illinois	Cameron Stingily 1 Yd Run (Mathew Sims Kick)	Northern Illinois 27–24
3	3:07	Ball State	Scott Secor 19 Yd	Tied 27–27
4	5:49	Northern Illinois	Da'Ron Brown 36 Yd Pass From Jordan Lynch (Mathew Sims Kick)	Northern Illinois 34–27
4	1:26	Northern Illinois	Jordan Lynch 16 Yd Run (Mathew Sims Kick)	Northern Illinois 41–27
4	0:46	Northern Illinois	Joe Windsor 49 Yd Interception Return (Mathew Sims Kick) (Mathew Sims Kick)	Northern Illinois 48–27

=== Toledo ===
Northern Illinois at Toledo

Team	1	2	3	4	Total
• #20 Huskies	7	0	14	14	35
Rockets	3	7	7	0	17

- Date: November 20
- Location: Glass Bowl
  Toledo, OH
- Game attendance: 21,974
- Game weather: Temp: 46 • Weather: Overcast
- TV announcers (ESPN2): Dave LaMont (play-by-play), Desmond Howard (analyst) and Quint Kessenich (sideline)

Scoring summary
1	13:34	Northern Illinois	James Spencer 19 Yd Run (Mathew Sims Kick)	Northern Illinois 7–0
1	0:50	Toledo	Jeremiah Detmer 36 Yd	Northern Illinois 7–3
2	0:51	Toledo	Alonzo Russell 45 Yd Pass From Terrance Owens (Jeremiah Detmer Kick)	Toledo 10–7
3	12:28	Northern Illinois	Jordan Lynch 12 Yd Run (Mathew Sims Kick)	Northern Illinois 14–10
3	8:34	Toledo	Bernard Reedy 36 Yd Pass From Terrance Owens (Jeremiah Detmer Kick)	Toledo 17–14
3	6:15	Northern Illinois	Jordan Lynch 31 Yd Run (Mathew Sims Kick)	Northern Illinois 21–17
4	9:42	Northern Illinois	Jordan Lynch 1 Yd Run (Mathew Sims Kick)	Northern Illinois 28–17
4	5:39	Northern Illinois	James Spencer 1 Yd Run (Mathew Sims Kick)	Northern Illinois 35–17

=== Western Michigan ===
Western Michigan at Northern Illinois

Team	1	2	3	4	Total
Broncos	0	7	0	7	14
• #18 Huskies	7	13	10	3	33

- Date: November 26
- Location: Huskie Stadium
  DeKalb, IL
- Game attendance: 17,679
- TV announcers (ESPN2): Dave LaMont (play-by-play), Ray Bentley (analyst) and Quint Kessenich (sideline)

Scoring summary
1	1:10	Northern Illinois	Juwan Brescacin 10 Yd Pass From Jordan Lynch (Mathew Sims Kick)	Northern Illinois 7–0
2	11:09	Western Michigan	Dareyon Chance 1 Yd Run (Andrew Haldeman Kick)	Tied 7–7
2	9:43	Northern Illinois	Jordan Lynch 29 Yd Run (Mathew Sims Kick)	Northern Illinois 14–7
2	7:31	Northern Illinois	Jordan Lynch 36 Yd Run (Pat Failed)	Northern Illinois 20–7
3	5:30	Northern Illinois	Mathew Sims 23 Yd	Northern Illinois 23–7
3	1:36	Northern Illinois	Jordan Lynch 37 Yd Run (Mathew Sims Kick)	Northern Illinois 30–7
4	12:52	Northern Illinois	Mathew Sims 32 Yd	Northern Illinois 33–7
4	4:40	Western Michigan	Antoin Scriven 1 Yd Run (Andrew Haldeman Kick)	Northern Illinois 33–14

=== Bowling Green (MAC Championship Game) ===
MAC Championship Game
Bowling Green vs. Northern Illinois

Team	1	2	3	4	Total
• Falcons	17	14	0	16	47
#16 Huskies	7	6	7	7	27

- Date: December 6
- Location: Ford Field
  Detroit, MI
- Game attendance: 21,106
- Game weather: Dome
- TV announcers (ESPN2): Carter Blackburn, Danny Kanell, & Allison Williams

Scoring summary
1	12:27	Bowling Green	Tyler Beck 28 Yd Pass From Matt Johnson (Tyler Tate Kick)	Bowling Green 7–0
1	9:08	Northern Illinois	Juwan Brescacin 14 Yd Pass From Jordan Lynch (Mathew Sims Kick)	Tied 7–7
1	6:49	Bowling Green	Tyler Tate 26 Yd	Bowling Green 10–7
1	2:32	Bowling Green	Ronnie Moore 36 Yd Pass From Matt Johnson (Tyler Tate Kick)	Bowling Green 17–7
2	14:51	Northern Illinois	Mathew Sims 51 Yd	Bowling Green 17–10
2	12:22	Northern Illinois	Mathew Sims 45 Yd	Bowling Green 17–13
2	5:39	Bowling Green	Heath Jackson 22 Yd Pass From Matt Johnson (Tyler Tate Kick)	Bowling Green 24–13
2	0:13	Bowling Green	Alex Bayer 12 Yd Pass From Matt Johnson (Tyler Tate Kick)	Bowling Green 31–13
3	12:23	Northern Illinois	Jordan Lynch 8 Yd Run (Mathew Sims Kick)	Bowling Green 31–20
4	14:50	Bowling Green	Tyler Tate 52 Yd	Bowling Green 34–20
4	10:17	Bowling Green	Travis Greene 6 Yd Pass From Matt Johnson (Pat Blocked)	Bowling Green 40–20
4	2:44	Bowling Green	Travis Greene 16 Yd Run (Tyler Tate Kick)	Bowling Green 47–20
4	0:14	Northern Illinois	Jordan Lynch 2 Yd Run (Mathew Sims Kick)	Bowling Green 47–27

=== Utah State (Poinsettia Bowl) ===
2013 Poinsettia Bowl
Northern Illinois vs. Utah State Aggies

Team	1	2	3	4	Total
• Aggies	3	3	7	8	21
#24 Huskies	0	7	0	7	14

- Date: December 26
- Location: Qualcomm Stadium
  San Diego, CA
- Game attendance: 23,408
- Television network: ESPN

== Roster ==
2013 Northern Illinois Huskies football team roster
Players
Coaches
Offense

Pos.	#	Name	Class
RB	3	Akeem Daniels	Sr
WR	4	Da'Ron Brown	Jr
QB	6	Jordan Lynch	Sr
WR	8	Matt Williams	Fr
QB	9	Matt McIntosh	So
WR	10	Tommylee Lewis	Jr
WR	11	Juwan Brescacin	So
QB	12	Drew Hare	Fr
WR	14	Aregeros Turner	Fr
WR	15	Terrance Roby	Fr
WR	19	Johnny Eagan	Fr
QB	19	Octavio Renteria	Fr
RB	20	Keith Harris Jr.	So
RB	23	Jordan Huff	Fr
RB	25	Giorgio Bowers	Jr
RB	28	Joel Bouagnon	Fr
RB	34	James Spencer	Jr
TE	35	Shane Wimann	Fr
RB	36	Draco Smith	Fr
TE	37	Desroy Maxwell	So
RB	38	Alex Morrow	Fr
TE	40	Ryan Stendler	Fr
RB	42	Cameron Stingily	Jr
FB	47	Rob Sterling	Jr
FB	48	Ricky Connors	Jr
OL	55	Andrew Ness	So
OL	57	Scott Taylor	Fr
C	59	Michael Gegner	Jr
OL	61	Aidan Conlon	So
OL	62	Patrick Husain	Jr
OL	65	Wes Ott	Jr
OL	66	Matt Battaglia	Sr
OL	67	Tyler Pitt	Jr
OL	68	Ron Brown	Fr
OL	70	Josh Ruka	Fr
OL	71	Levon Myers	Fr
OL	72	Ben Maruska	Fr
OL	74	Lincoln Howard	Fr
OL	75	Tate Briggs	Fr
OL	75	Tyler Loos	Jr
OL	76	Nick Calhoun	Fr
OL	77	Jared Volk	Sr
OL	78	Ryan Brown	Jr
OL	79	Matt Krempel	Sr
TE	80	Devonte' Majors	So
WR	81	Clayton Glasper	Fr
WR	82	Chad Beebe	Fr
TE	83	Luke Eakes	Jr
TE	84	Kevin Tennenbaum	So
WR	85	Angelo Sebastiano	So
WR	86	Jacob Brinlee	So
WR	87	Malik Mitchell	Fr
TE	88	Tim Semisch	Jr
WR	89	Blake Holder	Fr
TE	95	Jake Heckel	Fr

Defense

Pos.	#	Name	Class
S	1	Dechane Durante	Jr
CB	2	Sean Evans	Sr
RB	5	Jhony Faustin	Sr
LB	6	Jamaal Bass	Jr
LB	7	Michael Santacaterina	Jr
LB	8	Ladell Fleming	Fr
LB	9	Rasheen Lemon	So
DB	11	Mycial Allen	Fr
DB	13	Jackson Abresch	Fr
S	15	Jimmie Ward	Sr
CB	16	Charles Ivory	Fr
CB	17	Marckie Hayes	Jr
LB	18	Bobby Jones IV	Fr
CB	21	Marlon Moore	So
S	24	Dominique Ware	Sr
LB	27	Bobby Winkel	Jr
CB	29	Paris Logan	So
CB	31	Anthony Brooks	Fr
S	32	Nate McNeal	Sr
LB	33	Jamaal Payton	Fr
LB	40	Sean Folliard	Fr
LB	41	Cody Hazelett	Fr
DB	42	Justin Corbett	Fr
DB	43	Brandon Mayes	Fr
DE	44	Perez Ford	So
LB	45	Boomer Mays	So
DE	46	George Rainey	Sr
DE	49	Jason Meehan	Jr
DE	50	Austin Smaha	Fr
DT	51	Zach Andrerson	Sr
LB	52	Cody Sullivan	Fr
DE	53	Matthew Baltimore	Fr
DE	54	Cameron Clinton-Earl	So
DL	56	Brian Canoy	Fr
DT	57	Cornelius Henry	Jr
LB	58	Mike Cotton	So
DT	69	Corey Thomas	Fr
DL	90	William Lee	Fr
DT	91	Anthony Wells	Sr
DT	92	Mario Jones	Fr
DT	93	Ken Bishop	Sr
DT	94	Donovan Gordon	Jr
DL	96	Michael Ippolito	Fr
DE	97	Joe Windsor	Sr
DT	98	Cal Breedlove	Fr

Special teams

Pos.	#	Name	Class
K/P	12	Josh Brebant	Fr
P/K	26	Tyler Wedel	Jr
LS	66	Bobby Ramlet	Fr
LS	84	Brian Mayer	Jr
K	99	Matthew Sims	Sr

Head coach

- Rod Carey (Indiana)

Coordinators/assistant coaches

- Bob Cole (Widener)
  Offensive coordinator, quarterbacks
- Jay Niemann (Iowa State)
  Defensive coordinator, safeties
- Kelton Copeland (Emporia State)
  Running backs
- Brett Diersen (Huron)
  Defensive line, recruiting coordinator
- Kevin Kane (Kansas)
  Linebackers, special team coordinator
- Tim Polasek (Concordia (WI))
  Tight ends, fullbacks
- Kelvin Sigler (Alabama)
  Cornerbacks
- Joe Tripodi (Northwestern)
  Offensive line
- Thad Ward (Central Florida)
  Wide receivers
- Pat McAvoy (Northern Illinois)
  Offensive graduate assistant, offensive line
- Olaitan Oguntodu (Kansas)
  Defensive graduate assistant, linebackers
- Matt Lipman (Miami (OH))
  Asst. athletic director, director of football operations
- Brad Ohrt (Appalachian State)
  Director of sports performance
- Zach Opsal (Western Michigan)
  Graduate assistant, videos

Legend

- (C) Team captain
- (S) Suspended
- (I) Ineligible
- Injured
- Redshirt

Roster

== Awards ==
Jamaal Bass

- All-MAC First Team Outside Linebacker

Ken Bishop

- All-MAC First Team Down Lineman
- 2x MAC West Division Defensive Player of the Week (Weeks 3, 10)

Da'Ron Brown

- All-MAC Second Team Wide Receiver

Rod Carey

- MAC Coach of the Year

Dechane Durante

- All-MAC Third Team Defensive Back

Tommylee Lewis

- All-MAC First Team Wide Receiver
- 1x MAC West Division Offensive Player of the Week (Week 3)
- 1x MAC West Division Special Teams Player of the Week (Week 5)

Tyler Loos

- All-MAC First Team Offensive Lineman

Jordan Lynch

- Vern Smith Leadership Award
- MAC Offensive Player of the Year
- All-MAC First Team Quarterback
- 7x MAC West Division Offensive Player of the Week (Weeks 1, 4, 5, 8, 10, 12, 13)

Mathew Sims

- 1x MAC West Division Special Teams Player of the Week (Week 1)

Cameron Stingily

- 1x MAC West Division Offensive Player of the Week (Week 6)

Jared Volk

- All-MAC Second Team Offensive Lineman

Jimmie Ward

- All-MAC First Team Defensive Back

Joe Windsor

- All-MAC Third Team Down Lineman
