= 2013 Kent State Golden Flashes football team =

American college football season

2013 Kent State Golden Flashes football
- Conference: Mid-American Conference
- East Division
- Record: 4–8 (3–5 MAC)
- Head coach: Paul Haynes (1st season)
- Offensive coordinator: Brian Rock (3rd season)
- Offensive scheme: Spread
- Defensive coordinator: Brian George (1st season)
- Base defense: 4–3
- Home stadium: Dix Stadium

2013 Mid-American Conference football standings
	Conf.			Overall
Team	W		L	W		L
East Division
Bowling Green x$	7	–	1	10	–	4
Buffalo	6	–	2	8	–	5
Ohio	4	–	4	7	–	6
Akron	4	–	4	5	–	7
Kent State	3	–	5	4	–	8
UMass	1	–	7	1	–	11
Miami (OH)	0	–	8	0	–	12
West Division
Northern Illinois x	8	–	0	12	–	2
Ball State	7	–	1	10	–	3
Toledo	5	–	3	7	–	5
Central Michigan	5	–	3	6	–	6
Eastern Michigan	1	–	7	2	–	10
Western Michigan	1	–	7	1	–	11
Championship: Bowling Green 47, Northern Illinois 27
$ – Conference champion; x – Division champion/co-champions

The 2013 Kent State Golden Flashes football team represented Kent State University in the 2013 NCAA Division I FBS football season. They were led by first-year head coach Paul Haynes and played their home games at Dix Stadium as a member of the East Division of the Mid-American Conference. They finished the season 4–8, 3–5 in MAC play to finish in fifth place in the East Division.

== Schedule ==
Date	Time	Opponent	Site	TV	Result	Attendance
August 29	6:00 pm	Liberty (FCS)*	Dix Stadium; Kent, OH	ESPN3	W 17–10	20,790
September 7	12:00 pm	Bowling Green	Dix Stadium; Kent, Ohio (Battle for the Anniversary Award)	ESPN+	L 22–41	22,758
September 14	7:00 pm	at No. 8 LSU*	Tiger Stadium; Baton Rouge, LA	ESPNU	L 13–45	89,113
September 21	3:30 pm	at Penn State*	Beaver Stadium; University Park, PN	BTN	L 0–34	92,371
September 28	7:00 pm	at Western Michigan	Waldo Stadium; Kalamazoo, MI	ESPN3	W 32–14	15,503
October 5	3:30 pm	Northern Illinois^{†}	Dix Stadium; Kent, OH	TWCS	L 24–38	18,773
October 12	3:00 pm	at Ball State	Scheumann Stadium; Muncie, IN	ESPN3	L 24–27	16,861
October 19	3:00 pm	at South Alabama*	Ladd–Peebles Stadium; Mobile, AL		L 21–38	14,351
October 26	3:30 pm	Buffalo	Dix Stadium; Kent, OH	TWCS	L 21–41	14,197
November 2	3:30 pm	at Akron	InfoCision Stadium; Akron, OH	TWCS	L 7–16	20,239
November 13	8:00 pm	Miami (OH)	Dix Stadium; Kent, OH	ESPNU	W 24–6	8,573
November 19	8:00 pm	at Ohio	Peden Stadium; Athens, OH	ESPN2	W 44–13	17,181
*Non-conference game; ^{†}Homecoming; Rankings from AP Poll released prior to the game; All times are in Eastern time

- Source: Schedule

== Game summaries ==
=== Liberty ===
Liberty at Kent State

Team	1	2	3	4	Total
Flames	0	3	7	0	10
• Golden Flashes	7	0	0	10	17

- Date: August 29
- Location: Dix Stadium
  Kent, OH
- Game start: 6:00pm EST
- Game attendance: 20,790
- Television network: ESPN3

=== Bowling Green ===
Bowling Green at Kent State

Team	1	2	3	4	Total
• Falcons	7	17	10	7	41
Golden Flashes	8	14	0	0	22

- Date: September 7
- Location: Dix Stadium
  Kent, OH
- Television network: ESPN Plus

=== LSU ===
Kent State at #8 LSU

Team	1	2	3	4	Total
Golden Flashes	0	10	3	0	13
• #8 Tigers	21	10	0	14	45

- Date: September 14
- Location: Tiger Stadium
  Baton Rouge, LA

=== Penn State ===
Kent State at Penn State

Team	1	2	3	4	Total
Golden Flashes	0	0	0	0	0
Nittany Lions	0	0	0	0	0

- Date: September 21
- Location: Beaver Stadium
  University Park, PA

=== Western Michigan ===
Kent State at Western Michigan

Team	1	2	3	4	Total
• Golden Flashes	7	8	0	0	15
Broncos	0	7	0	0	7

- Date: September 28
- Location: Waldo Stadium
  Kalamazoo, MI
- Referee: Rod Snodgrass
- Television network: ESPN3

=== Northern Illinois ===
Northern Illinois at Kent State

Team	1	2	3	4	Total
Huskies	0	0	0	0	0
Golden Flashes	0	0	0	0	0

- Date: October 5
- Location: Dix Stadium
  Kent, OH

=== Ball State ===
Kent State at Ball State

Team	1	2	3	4	Total
Golden Flashes	0	0	0	0	0
Cardinals	0	0	0	0	0

- Date: October 12
- Location: Scheumann Stadium
  Muncie, IN

=== South Alabama ===
Kent State at South Alabama

Team	1	2	3	4	Total
Golden Flashes	0	0	0	0	0
Jaguars	0	0	0	0	0

- Date: October 19
- Location: Ladd–Peebles Stadium
  Mobile, AL

=== Buffalo ===
Buffalo at Kent State

Team	1	2	3	4	Total
Bulls	0	0	0	0	0
Golden Flashes	0	0	0	0	0

- Date: October 26
- Location: Dix Stadium
  Kent, OH

=== Akron ===
Kent State at Akron

Team	1	2	3	4	Total
Golden Flashes	0	0	0	0	0
Zips	0	0	0	0	0

- Date: November 2
- Location: InfoCision Stadium-Summa Field
  Akron, OH

=== Miami [OH] ===
Miami [OH] at Kent State

Team	1	2	3	4	Total
RedHawks	0	0	0	0	0
Golden Flashes	0	0	0	0	0

- Date: November 13
- Location: Dix Stadium
  Kent, OH
- Television network: ESPN2 or U

=== Ohio ===
Kent State at Ohio

Team	1	2	3	4	Total
Golden Flashes	0	0	0	0	0
Bobcats	0	0	0	0	0

- Date: November 19
- Location: Peden Stadium
  Athens, OH
- Television network: ESPN2 or U
