= 2013 Akron Zips football team =

American college football season

2013 Akron Zips football
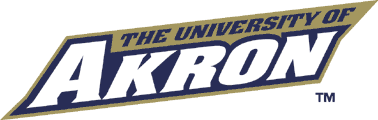
- Conference: Mid-American Conference
- East Division
- Record: 5–7 (4–4 MAC)
- Head coach: Terry Bowden (2nd season)
- Offensive coordinator: A. J. Milwee (1st season)
- Offensive scheme: Spread
- Defensive coordinator: Chuck Amato (2nd season)
- Base defense: 4–3
- Home stadium: InfoCision Stadium–Summa Field

2013 Mid-American Conference football standings
	Conf.			Overall
Team	W		L	W		L
East Division
Bowling Green x$	7	–	1	10	–	4
Buffalo	6	–	2	8	–	5
Ohio	4	–	4	7	–	6
Akron	4	–	4	5	–	7
Kent State	3	–	5	4	–	8
UMass	1	–	7	1	–	11
Miami (OH)	0	–	8	0	–	12
West Division
Northern Illinois x	8	–	0	12	–	2
Ball State	7	–	1	10	–	3
Toledo	5	–	3	7	–	5
Central Michigan	5	–	3	6	–	6
Eastern Michigan	1	–	7	2	–	10
Western Michigan	1	–	7	1	–	11
Championship: Bowling Green 47, Northern Illinois 27
$ – Conference champion; x – Division champion/co-champions

The 2013 Akron Zips football team represented the University of Akron in the 2013 NCAA Division I FBS football season. They were led by second-year head coach Terry Bowden and played their home games at InfoCision Stadium–Summa Field. They were a member of the East Division of the Mid-American Conference and finished the season with a 5–7 record.

== Schedule ==
Date	Time	Opponent	Site	TV	Result	Attendance
August 29	7:00 p.m.	at UCF*	Bright House Networks Stadium; Orlando, FL	ESPN3	L 7–38	35,115
September 7	6:00 p.m.	No. 20 (FCS) James Madison*	InfoCision Stadium; Akron, OH	ESPN3	W 35–33	19,653
September 14	Noon	at No. 11 Michigan*	Michigan Stadium; Ann Arbor, MI	BTN	L 24–28	107,120
September 21	6:00 p.m.	Louisiana–Lafayette*	InfoCision Stadium; Akron, OH	ESPN3	L 30–35	18,809
September 28	2:30 p.m.	at Bowling Green	Doyt Perry Stadium; Bowling Green, OH	ESPN3	L 14–31	13,262
October 5	2:00 p.m.	Ohio^{†}	InfoCision Stadium; Akron, OH	ESPN3	L 3–43	19,775
October 12	5:00 p.m.	at No. 23 Northern Illinois	Huskie Stadium; DeKalb, IL	ESPN3	L 20–27	23,595
October 19	1:00 p.m.	at Miami (OH)	Yager Stadium; Oxford, OH	ESPN3	W 24–17	15,164
October 26	Noon	Ball State	InfoCision Stadium; Akron, OH	ESPN+	L 24–42	16,119
November 2	3:30 p.m.	Kent State	InfoCision Stadium; Akron, OH (Battle for the Wagon Wheel)	TWCS	W 16–7	20,239
November 16	1:00 p.m.	at Massachusetts	Gillette Stadium; Foxborough, MA	ESPN3	W 14–13	10,599
November 29	Noon	Toledo	InfoCision Stadium; Akron, OH	ESPN3	W 31–29	12,506
*Non-conference game; ^{†}Homecoming; Rankings from AP Poll released prior to the game; All times are in Eastern time

- Source: Schedule

== Roster ==
2013 Akron Zips football team roster
Players
Coaches
Offense

Pos.	#	Name	Class
WR	1	Mykel Traylor-Bennett	Fr
RB	2	Broderick Alexander	Sr
WR	3	L. T. Smith	Jr
QB	6	Dalton Easton	Fr
RB	7	Jawon Chisholm	Jr
QB	8	Curtis Watson	Sr
RB	10	Hakeem Lawrence	So
WR	11	Zach D'Orazio	So
WR	12	Imani Davis	So
QB	13	Tyler Foster	Fr
QB	13	Tommy Woodson	Fr
WR	14	Nice Bice	Jr
QB	15	Nick Hirschman	Jr
QB	16	Kyle Pohl	So
WR	17	Wade Edwards	Fr
TE	18	Will Fleming	Sr
RB	22	Tyler Williams	Jr
RB	25	D. J. Jones	Fr
RB	26	Rayshawn Walton	Jr
RB	28	Marvin Staten	Jr
RB	30	Bryan Green	Fr
RB	34	Conor Hundley	So
WR	35	Keith Sconiers	Sr
WR	37	Danny Seafler	So
FB	39	Sean Crandall	Fr
WR	48	Rufus Walls	Sr
FB	49	Christian Allen	Fr
OL	56	Isaiah Williams	Jr
OL	62	Rodney Carroll	Fr
OT	65	Kevin Mills	Fr
G	67	Travis Switzer	Jr
OL	70	Michael Casimos	Fr
OL	71	Quaison Osborne	So
OL	72	Joe Petrides	Sr
OL	74	Brett Lee	So
OL	75	Dylan Brumbaugh	So
OT	76	Jarrod Pughsley	Sr
OL	77	Andrew Bohan	So
OL	78	Micah Lio	Jr
OL	79	Drew Deneher	So
WR	80	Andrew Pratt	So
WR	81	Tyrell Goodman	So
WR	83	Dee Frieson	Sr
WR	85	L.J. Chambers	Jr
TE	86	Jon Root	Sr
TE	87	Anthony Ritossa	Jr
WR	88	Jerrod Dillard	Sr
FB	97	Jeff Allen	Jr

Defense

Pos.	#	Name	Class
S	4	Anthony Holmes	Sr
LB	5	Justin March	Jr
CB	6	DeAndre Scott	Fr
DL	8	Keontae Hollis	Jr
DE	9	C. J. James	Sr
CB	14	Donte Williams	Jr
CB	19	John Senter	So
CB	20	Malachi Freeman	Sr
CB	21	Bill Alexander	Sr
CB	21	Alex Mack	Sr
S	23	Bre' Ford	Jr
CB	24	Carl Washington	So
CB	25	Josh Smith	Fr
S	26	Devonte Morgan	Jr
S	27	Johnny Robinson	Jr
CB	29	Bryce Cheek	So
CB	31	Emmanuel Lartey	Sr
CB	32	Martel Durant	Jr
S	33	Sean Graves	Sr
S	35	Cory Morrow	Fr
DL	36	Cody Grice	So
S	39	James Turner	So
DL	40	Austin Bailey	Sr
S	43	Benny Cunningham	Fr
LB	44	Nick Rossi	Jr
LB	47	Gary Ransom	Jr
LB	50	Jamar Williams	Sr
LB	52	Jon Shelby	Jr
LB	53	Jatavis Brown	So
LB	54	Dylan Evans	So
DL	55	Jamel Turner	So
DE	58	Nico Caponi	Sr
LB	59	John Rachel	Fr
LB	60	Robert Smith-Harris	Sr
LB	61	Ben Karam	Jr
DL	63	Varnell Garrett	Jr
DL	66	Dakota Wagner	Fr
DL	79	Mike Davis	So
DL	90	Jason Stargel	Fr
DE	91	Albert Presley	Sr
DE	92	Daryan Martin	Fr
LB	93	Connor Seeman	Sr
DL	95	Robert Young	Sr
DL	96	Alfonso Horner	So
DL	99	James Price	So

Special teams

Pos.	#	Name	Class
P	38	Zach Paul	So
K	48	Robert Stein	So
K	68	Sam Scifo	Fr
LS	98	Paul Skolmutch	Sr

Head coach

- Terry Bowden

Coordinators/assistant coaches

- Chuck Amato (defensive coordinator / associate head coach)
- Jeff Bowden (special teams coordinator / outside receivers)
- A. J. Milwee (offensive coordinator / quarterbacks coach)
- Trent Boykin (running backs)
- John Pont (Recruiting coordinator / Inside Receivers)
- Alan Arrington (offensive line); with Arrington's accidental death, this position is vacant
- Todd Stroud (defensive line)
- Terrell Buckley (Cornerbacks)
- Mike Woodford (Safeties)
- Ben Murphy (Director of football operations)
- Mark Ouimet (assistant director of football operations)
- Kyle Futch (offensive graduate assistant)
- Jason Morgan (offensive graduate assistant)
- Dan Webb (strength and conditioning)
- Matt Gildersleeve (strength and conditioning graduate assistant)
- Tommie Westbrook (strength and conditioning graduate assistant)
- Jason Sanders (Coordinator of Video Services)
- Nick Andrusisian (Coordinator of Video Services Graduate Assistant)

Legend

- (C) Team captain
- (S) Suspended
- (I) Ineligible
- Injured
- Redshirt

Roster
Last update: June 19, 2013
