= 2013 Toledo Rockets football team =

American college football season

2013 Toledo Rockets football
- Conference: Mid-American Conference
- West Division
- Record: 7–5 (5–3 MAC)
- Head coach: Matt Campbell (2nd season)
- Co-offensive coordinators: Jason Candle (1st season); Louis Ayeni (1st season)
- Offensive scheme: Spread
- Defensive coordinator: Tom Matukewicz (2nd season)
- Base defense: 4–3
- Home stadium: Glass Bowl

2013 Mid-American Conference football standings
	Conf.			Overall
Team	W		L	W		L
East Division
Bowling Green x$	7	–	1	10	–	4
Buffalo	6	–	2	8	–	5
Ohio	4	–	4	7	–	6
Akron	4	–	4	5	–	7
Kent State	3	–	5	4	–	8
UMass	1	–	7	1	–	11
Miami (OH)	0	–	8	0	–	12
West Division
Northern Illinois x	8	–	0	12	–	2
Ball State	7	–	1	10	–	3
Toledo	5	–	3	7	–	5
Central Michigan	5	–	3	6	–	6
Eastern Michigan	1	–	7	2	–	10
Western Michigan	1	–	7	1	–	11
Championship: Bowling Green 47, Northern Illinois 27
$ – Conference champion; x – Division champion/co-champions

The 2013 Toledo Rockets football team represented the University of Toledo in the 2013 NCAA Division I FBS football season. They were led by head coach Matt Campbell in his second full year after coaching the Rockets in the 2011 Military Bowl. They played their home games at the Glass Bowl and are members of the West Division of the Mid-American Conference. They finished the season 7–5, 5–3 in MAC play to finish in a tie for third place in the West Division. Despite being bowl eligible, they were not invited to a bowl game.

== Schedule ==
Date	Time	Opponent	Site	TV	Result	Attendance
August 31	12:21 p.m.	at No. 10 Florida*	Ben Hill Griffin Stadium; Gainesville, FL	SECTV	L 6–24	83,604
September 7	3:30 p.m.	at Missouri*	Faurot Field; Columbia, MO	ESPNU	L 23–38	56,785
September 14	7:00 p.m.	No. 2 (FCS) Eastern Washington*	Glass Bowl; Toledo, OH	ESPN3	W 33–21	20,459
September 21	12:00 p.m.	at Central Michigan	Kelly/Shorts Stadium; Mount Pleasant, MI	ESPN+	W 38–17	15,136
September 28	3:00 p.m.	at Ball State	Scheumann Stadium; Muncie, IN	ESPN3	L 24–31	18,329
October 5	3:00 p.m.	Western Michigan	Glass Bowl; Toledo, OH	ESPN3	W 47–20	17,621
October 19	12:00 p.m.	Navy*	Glass Bowl; Toledo, OH	ESPNews	W 45–44 ^{2OT}	18,221
October 26	2:30 p.m.	at Bowling Green	Doyt Perry Stadium; Bowling Green, OH (Battle of I-75)	ESPN3	W 28–25	21,724
November 2	7:00 p.m.	Eastern Michigan	Glass Bowl; Toledo, OH	ESPN3	W 55–16	17,492
November 12	7:30 p.m.	Buffalo	Glass Bowl; Toledo, OH	ESPNU	W 51–41	15,036
November 20	8:00 p.m.	No. 20 Northern Illinois	Glass Bowl; Toledo, OH	ESPN2	L 17–35	21,974
November 29	12:00 p.m.	at Akron	InfoCision Stadium; Akron, OH	ESPN3	L 29–31	12,506
*Non-conference game; Rankings from AP Poll released prior to the game; All times are in Eastern time

== Game summaries ==
=== Florida ===
Toledo at Florida

Team	1	2	3	4	Total
Rockets	0	3	3	0	6
• #10 Gators	7	10	7	0	24

- Date: August 31
- Location: Ben Hill Griffin Stadium
  Gainesville, FL

=== Missouri ===
Toledo at Missouri

Team	1	2	3	4	Total
Rockets	3	6	14	0	23
• Tigers	10	7	14	7	38

- Date: September 7
- Location: Faurot Field
  Columbia, MO

=== Eastern Washington ===
Eastern Washington at Toledo

Team	1	2	3	4	Total
Eagles	14	0	0	7	21
• Rockets	13	3	7	10	33

- Date: September 14
- Location: Glass Bowl
  Toledo, OH
- Television network: ESPN3

=== Central Michigan ===
Toledo at Central Michigan

Team	1	2	3	4	Total
• Rockets	14	10	0	14	38
Chippewas	7	7	3	0	17

- Date: September 21
- Location: Kelly/Shorts Stadium
  Mt. Pleasant, MI
- Television network: ESPN+

=== Ball State ===
Toledo at Ball State

Team	1	2	3	4	Total
Rockets	0	0	0	0	0
Cardinals	0	0	0	0	0

- Date: September 28
- Location: Scheumann Stadium
  Mincie, IN

=== Western Michigan ===
Western Michigan at Toledo

Team	1	2	3	4	Total
Broncos	0	0	0	0	0
Rockets	0	0	0	0	0

- Date: October 5
- Location: Glass Bowl
  Toledo, OH

=== Navy ===
Navy at Toledo

Team	1	2	3	4	Total
Midshipmen	0	0	0	0	0
Rockets	0	0	0	0	0

- Date: October 19
- Location: Glass Bowl
  Toledo, OH
- Television network: ESPN Networks

=== Bowling Green ===
Toledo at Bowling Green

Team	1	2	3	4	Total
Rockets	0	0	0	0	0
Falcons	0	0	0	0	0

- Date: October 26
- Location: Doyt Perry Stadium
  Bowling Green, OH

=== Eastern Michigan ===
Eastern Michigan at Toledo

Team	1	2	3	4	Total
Eagles	0	0	0	0	0
Rockets	0	0	0	0	0

- Date: November 2
- Location: Glass Bowl
  Toledo, OH

=== Buffalo ===
Buffalo at Toledo

Team	1	2	3	4	Total
Bulls	0	0	0	0	0
Rockets	0	0	0	0	0

- Date: November 12
- Location: Glass Bowl
  Toledo, OH
- Television network: ESPNU/ESPN3

=== Northern Illinois ===
Northern Illinois at Toledo

Team	1	2	3	4	Total
• #20 Huskies	7	0	14	14	35
Rockets	3	7	7	0	17

- Date: November 20
- Location: Glass Bowl
  Toledo, OH
- Television network: ESPN2

=== Akron ===
Toledo at Akron

Team	1	2	3	4	Total
Rockets	0	0	0	0	0
Zips	0	0	0	0	0

- Date: November 29
- Location: InfoCision Stadium
  Akron, OH
- Television network: ESPNU/ESPN3
