= Jordan Lynch =

American gridiron football player and coach (born 1990)

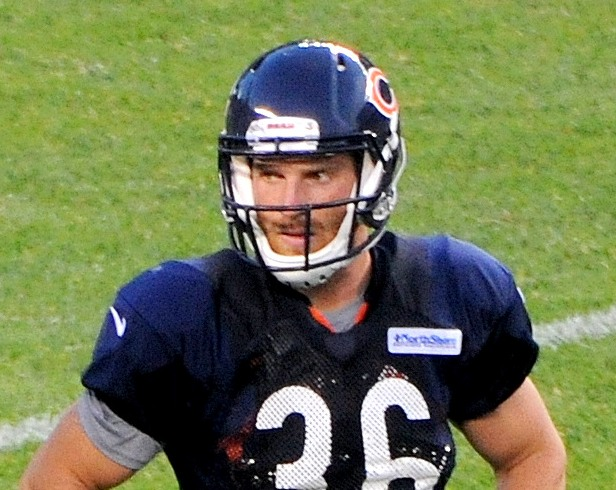
- Lynch at Chicago Bears training camp in 2014

Mount Carmel High School
- Title: Head coach

Personal information
- Born: October 3, 1990 (age 36); Chicago, Illinois, U.S.

Career information
- Position: Quarterback (No. 5)
- High school: Mount Carmel (Chicago)
- College: Northern Illinois (2009–2013)
- NFL draft: 2014: undrafted

Career history

Playing
- Chicago Bears (2014)*; Edmonton Eskimos (2015–2016)
- * Offseason or practice squad member only

Coaching
- Northern Illinois (2017) Quarterbacks coach; Mount Carmel High School (2018–present) Head coach

Awards and highlights
- Grey Cup champion (2015); Chic Harley Award (2013); First-team All-American (2013); Second-team All-American (2012); 2× MAC Most Valuable Player (2012, 2013); 2× MAC Offensive Player of the Year (2012, 2013); 5x IHSA Football Champion (2019, 2022, 2023, 2024, 2025)
- Stats at Pro Football Reference
- College Football Hall of Fame

Jordan Lynch (born October 3, 1990) is an American former professional football player who was a quarterback for the Edmonton Eskimos of the Canadian Football League (CFL). He played college football for the Northern Illinois Huskies, earning first-team All-American honors as an all-purpose player and finishing as a finalist for the Heisman Trophy in 2013. After going undrafted in the 2014 NFL draft, Lynch had a stint with the Chicago Bears of the National Football League (NFL) before playing with Edmonton in the CFL.

Lynch is currently the head football coach of Mount Carmel High School in his hometown of Chicago, Illinois. He succeeded Frank Lenti, who was the coach of the program for 34 years.

== Early life ==
After graduating from St. Christina Elementary School in the Mt. Greenwood area of Chicago, Lynch attended Chicago (IL) Mount Carmel and graduated in 2009. He played varsity for three years under coach Frank Lenti. He started two of those three years.

== College career ==
At the beginning of his college career at NIU in DeKalb, IL Lynch was redshirted in 2009. He was the backup quarterback to Chandler Harnish in 2010 and 2011. During those two years he completed 19 of 26 passes for 179 yards and two touchdowns. He also rushed for 608 yards on 76 carries with six touchdowns.

In 2012, he became NIU's starting quarterback. During the 2012 marathon MAC Championship Game, Lynch increased his rushing stats to 1,771 yards on 271 carries, breaking the previous NCAA record for rushing yards in a season by a quarterback set by Denard Robinson. He finished the season with 1,815 yards. Lynch finished 7th in Heisman Voting at the end of 2012, and won the Vern Smith Leadership Award, which is awarded to the best player in the Mid-American Conference.

On October 19, 2013, Lynch broke the record for the most rushing yards by a quarterback in one game, finishing with 316 yards and three touchdowns, en route to winning the Walter Camp National Player of the Week. On October 26 against Eastern Michigan, Lynch was responsible for six total touchdowns, throwing four, running for one, and catching a touchdown, gaining 339 total yards. On November 26, 2013, in Dekalb, Illinois, Lynch broke the single-game quarterback rushing yards record again, rushing for 321 yards versus the Western Michigan University Broncos. On December 9, 2013, Lynch was announced as a finalist for the 2013 Heisman Trophy. He finished third in the voting that was announced on December 14, 2013. On December 17, Lynch was named a first-team All-American as an all-purpose player. He finished the season with 1,920 rushing yards, which broke his record from the previous season.

On January 14, 2026, Lynch was inducted into the College Football Hall of Fame.

=== College statistics ===
Season	Team	Games			Passing								Rushing			
Season	Team	GP	GS	Record	Cmp	Att	Pct	Yds	Avg	TD	Int	Rate	Att	Yds	Avg	TD
2009	Northern Illinois	0	0	—	Redshirted (redshirt)											
2010	Northern Illinois	9	0	—	4	6	66.7	13	2.2	1	0	139.9	31	362	11.7	3
2011	Northern Illinois	13	0	—	15	20	75.0	166	8.3	1	0	161.2	45	246	5.5	3
2012	Northern Illinois	14	14	12–2	237	394	60.2	3,138	8.0	25	6	144.9	294	1,815	6.2	19
2013	Northern Illinois	14	14	12–2	253	404	62.6	2,892	7.2	24	8	138.4	292	1,920	6.6	23
Totals		50	28	24–4	509	824	61.3	6,209	7.5	51	14	142.1	662	4,343	6.6	48

=== NCAA records ===
- Most rushing yards by a quarterback in a season: 1,920 (2013)
- Most 100-yard rushing games by a quarterback in a season: 12 (2012)
- Second most rushing yards per game by a quarterback in a season: 137.1 (2013)

== Professional career ==
=== Chicago Bears ===
Lynch was eligible for the 2014 NFL draft, but was not drafted. The Chicago Bears signed him to a contract as a running back shortly after the draft concluded. The Bears released Lynch on August 29, 2014.

=== Edmonton Eskimos ===
On January 14, 2015, Lynch signed with the Edmonton Eskimos of the Canadian Football League. He scored his first CFL touchdown against the Ottawa RedBlacks on Thursday, July 9. Lynch was part of the Eskimos team that won the 2015 Grey Cup, and scored the game-winning touchdown on a quarterback sneak with 3:22 remaining in the game for the Eskimos.

On March 8, 2017, Lynch announced his retirement from professional football. The same day, the Northern Illinois University Athletic Department announced that Lynch had been hired as a running backs coach for the Huskies football program.

== Coaching career ==
=== Northern Illinois University ===
On March 8, 2017, NIU hired Lynch as the teams quarterbacks coach. Lynch served under his former head coach Rod Carey, who was hired as NIU's head coach after Lynch's junior season.

=== Mount Carmel High School ===
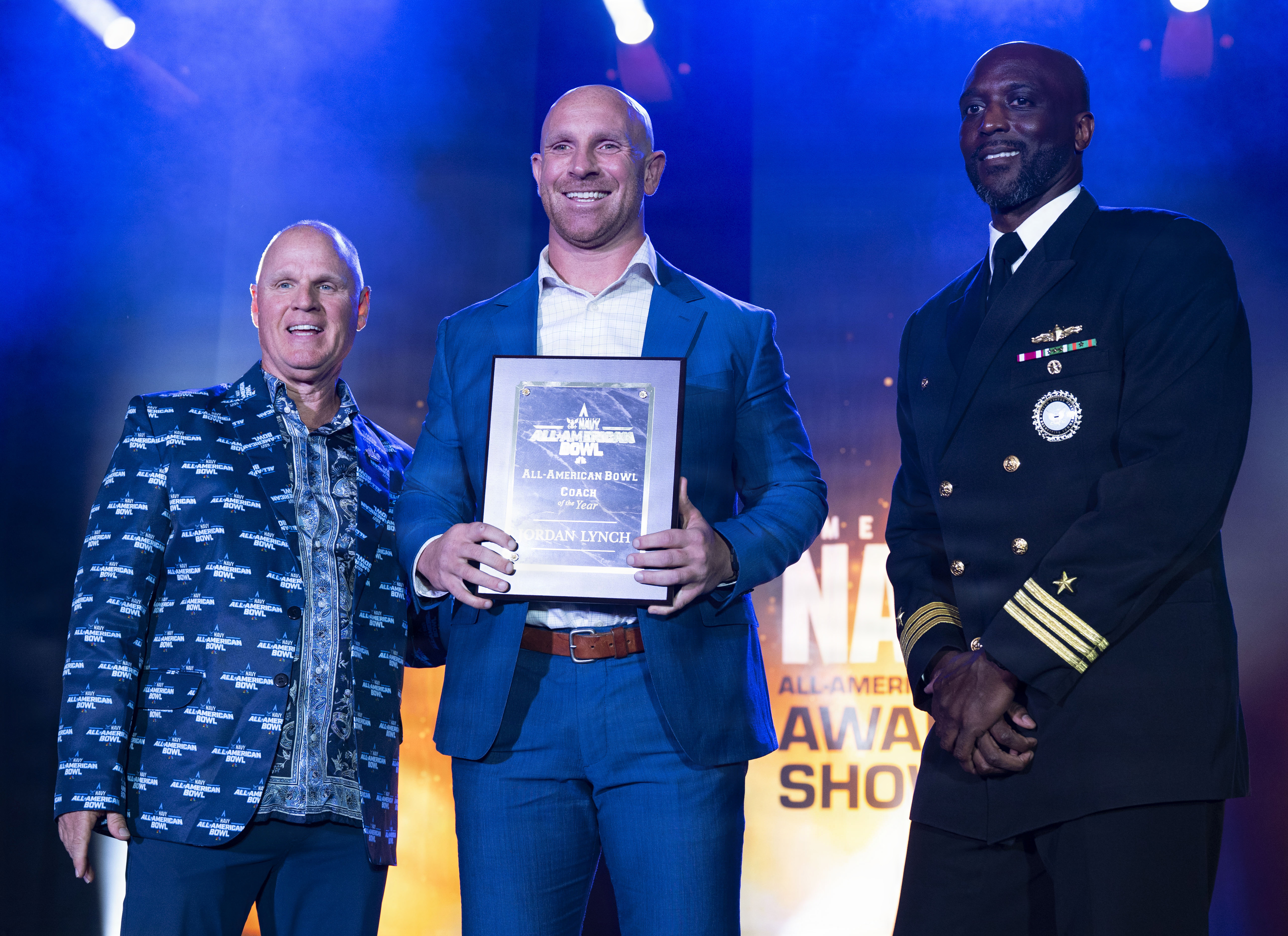
Lynch (center) receiving the All-American Bowl Coach of the Year Award in 2026

In December 2017, Mount Carmel High School in Chicago announced that Lynch would be returning to the school as the team's head coach. He replaced Frank Lenti, who has been the head coach of the program for 34 years and won 12 state championships, in a move that received some shock and criticism from local media and fans.

In November 2019, Lynch led the Caravan to their 13th IHSA Football State Championship, defeating J.J. McCarthy and Nazareth Academy 37-13. Lynch's younger brother Justin, the Caravan's quarterback, rushed for all five Mount Carmel touchdowns in the victory.
In November 2022, Lynch led the Caravan to their 14th IHSA Football State Championship, and 26th overall, over Batavia, the Caravan's second straight year eliminating the Bulldogs from the playoffs.

In November 2023, Lynch led the Caravan to their 15th IHSA Football Championship. They beat Downers Grove North High School, 35-10. This was Jordan Lynch's third coaching championship.

In November 2024, Lynch led the Caravan to their 16th IHSA Football Championship. They beat Batavia High School, 55-34. This was Jordan Lynch's fourth coaching championship.

In December 2025, Lynch coached the Caravan to their 17th IHSA Football Championship. They beat Oswego High School, 20-3. Lynch’s fifth coaching championship, fourth in a row, and first 8A title.
