= 2013 Eastern Michigan Eagles football team =

American college football season

2013 Eastern Michigan Eagles football
- Conference: Mid-American Conference
- West Division
- Record: 2–10 (1–7 MAC)
- Head coach: Ron English (5th season; first 9 games); Stan Parrish (interim; final 3 games)
- Offensive coordinator: Stan Parrish (1st season)
- Offensive scheme: Multiple
- Base defense: 4–3
- Home stadium: Rynearson Stadium

2013 Mid-American Conference football standings
	Conf.			Overall
Team	W		L	W		L
East Division
Bowling Green x$	7	–	1	10	–	4
Buffalo	6	–	2	8	–	5
Ohio	4	–	4	7	–	6
Akron	4	–	4	5	–	7
Kent State	3	–	5	4	–	8
UMass	1	–	7	1	–	11
Miami (OH)	0	–	8	0	–	12
West Division
Northern Illinois x	8	–	0	12	–	2
Ball State	7	–	1	10	–	3
Toledo	5	–	3	7	–	5
Central Michigan	5	–	3	6	–	6
Eastern Michigan	1	–	7	2	–	10
Western Michigan	1	–	7	1	–	11
Championship: Bowling Green 47, Northern Illinois 27
$ – Conference champion; x – Division champion/co-champions

The 2013 Eastern Michigan Eagles football team represented Eastern Michigan University in the 2013 NCAA Division I FBS football season. The Eagles played their home games at Rynearson Stadium and were a member of the West Division of the Mid-American Conference. The team was led by fifth year head coach Ron English through the first nine games of the season (posting a 1–8 record). English was fired mid-season and replaced on an interim basis by Stan Parrish, previously the team's offensive coordinator.

== Schedule ==
Date	Time	Opponent	Site	TV	Result	Attendance
August 31	6:00 pm	Howard*	Rynearson Stadium; Ypsilanti, MI	ESPN3	W 34–24	7,668
September 7	12:00 pm	at Penn State*	Beaver Stadium; University Park, PA	BTN	L 7–45	92,863
September 14	1:00 pm	at Rutgers*	High Point Solutions Stadium; Piscataway, NJ	ESPN3	L 10–28	47,604
September 21	1:00 pm	Ball State^{†}	Rynearson Stadium; Ypsilanti, MI	ESPN3	L 20–51	5,402
October 5	12:00 pm	at Buffalo	University at Buffalo Stadium; Amherst, NY	ESPN Plus	L 14–42	23,602
October 12	12:00 pm	at Army*	Michie Stadium; West Point, NY	CBSSN	L 25–50	36,006
October 19	1:00 pm	Ohio	Rynearson Stadium; Ypsilanti, MI	ESPN3	L 28–56	3,257
October 26	2:30 pm	at No. 23 Northern Illinois	Huskie Stadium; DeKalb, IL	CSNC	L 20–59	20,185
November 2	7:00 pm	at Toledo	Glass Bowl; Toledo, OH	ESPN3	L 16–55	17,492
November 9	1:00 pm	Western Michigan	Rynearson Stadium; Ypsilanti, MI (Michigan MAC Trophy)	ESPN3	W 35–32 ^{OT}	2,177
November 23	1:00 pm	Bowling Green	Rynearson Stadium; Ypsilanti, MI	ESPN3	L 7–58	1,751
November 29	2:00 pm	at Central Michigan	Kelly/Shorts Stadium; Mount Pleasant, MI (rivalry)	ESPN3	L 10–42	5,214
*Non-conference game; ^{†}Homecoming; Rankings from AP Poll released prior to the game; All times are in Eastern time

== Game summaries ==
=== Howard ===
Howard at Eastern Michigan

Team	1	2	3	4	Total
Bison	0	10	14	0	24
• Eagles	0	13	7	14	34

- Date: August 29
- Location: Rynearson Stadium
  Ypsilanti, MI
- Television network: ESPN3

=== Penn State ===
Eastern Michigan at Penn State

Team	1	2	3	4	Total
Eaqles	7	0	0	0	7
• Nittany Lions	7	10	7	21	45

- Date: September 7
- Location: Beaver Stadium
  University Park, PA
- Television network: BTN

=== Rutgers ===
Eastern Michigan at Rutgers

Team	1	2	3	4	Total
Eagles	3	7	0	0	10
• Scarlet Knights	14	0	7	7	28

- Date: September 14
- Location: High Point Solutions Stadium
  Piscataway, NJ

=== Ball State ===
Ball State at Eastern Michigan

Team	1	2	3	4	Total
• Cardinals	27	7	17	0	51
Eagles	6	7	7	0	20

- Date: September 21
- Location: Rynearson Stadium
  Ypsilanti, Michigan

=== Buffalo ===
Eastern Michigan at Buffalo

Team	1	2	3	4	Total
Eagles	0	7	0	7	14
• Bulls	14	14	14	0	42

- Date: October 5
- Location: UB Stadium
  Buffalo, NY
- Television network: ESPN+

=== Army ===
Eastern Michigan at Army

Team	1	2	3	4	Total
Eagles	15	3	0	7	25
• Black Knights	15	7	21	7	50

- Date: October 12
- Location: Michie Stadium
  West Point, NY
- Television network: CBSSN

=== Ohio ===
Ohio at Eastern Michigan

Team	1	2	3	4	Total
• Bobcats	21	0	21	14	56
Eagles	7	7	7	7	28

- Date: October 19
- Location: Rynearson Stadium
  Ypsilanti, MI

=== Northern Illinois ===
Eastern Michigan at Northern Illinois

Team	1	2	3	4	Total
Eagles	3	0	10	7	20
• #23 Huskies	21	17	14	7	59

- Date: October 26
- Location: Huskie Stadium
  DeKalb, IL
- Television network: CSNCH

=== Toledo ===
Eastern Michigan at Toledo

Team	1	2	3	4	Total
Eagles	0	10	0	6	16
• Rockets	21	17	10	7	55

- Date: November 2
- Location: Glass Bowl
  Toledo, OH

=== Western Michigan ===
Western Michigan at Eastern Michigan

Team	1	2	3	4	OT	Total
Broncos	10	6	10	3	3	32
• Eagles	7	7	7	8	6	35

- Date: November 9
- Location: Rynearson Stadium
  Ypsilanti, MI

=== Bowling Green ===
Bowling Green at Eastern Michigan

Team	1	2	3	4	Total
• Falcons	17	17	17	7	58
Eagles	7	0	0	0	7

- Date: November 23
- Location: Rynearson Stadium
  Ypsilanti, MI

=== Central Michigan ===
Eastern Michigan at Central Michigan

Team	1	2	3	4	Total
Eagles	0	10	0	0	10
• Chippewas	14	7	14	7	42

- Date: November 29
- Location: Kelly/Shorts Stadium
  Mount Pleasant, MI
- Television network: ESPN3
