= Scott Secor =

American football player (born 1992)

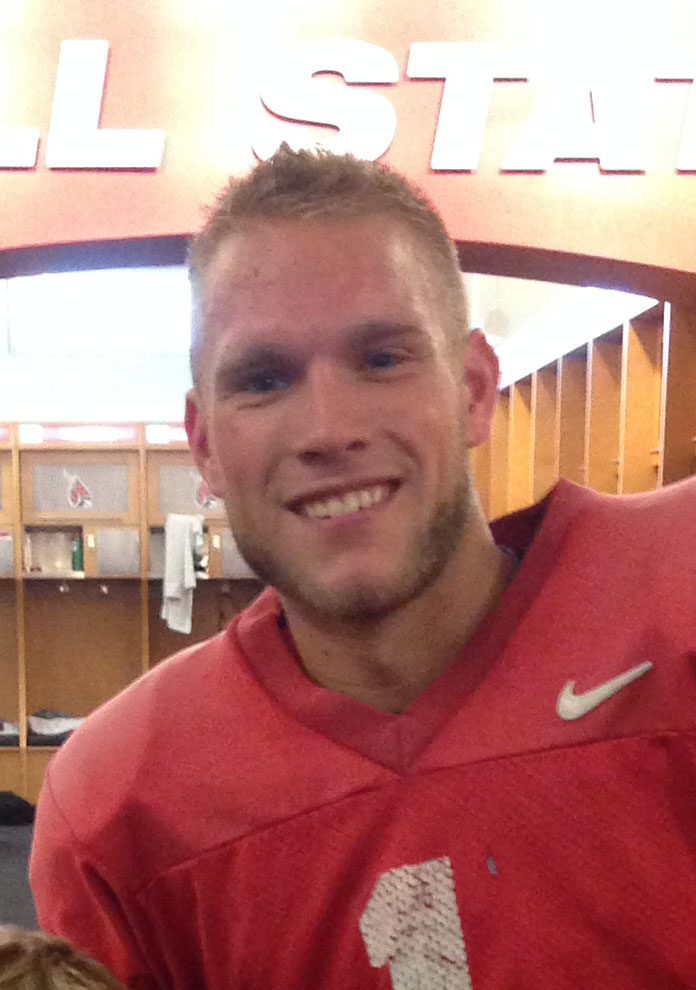
- Scott Secor head shot, Ball State Football, Aug 2014.jpg

No. 1
- Position: Placekicker

Personal information
- Born: April 3, 1992 (age 34); Hoffman Estates, Illinois, U.S.
- Listed height: 5 ft 8 in (1.73 m)
- Listed weight: 166 lb (75 kg)

Career information
- High school: Lincoln-Way Central High School
- College: Ball State (2010–2014)

Awards and highlights
- MAC Special Teams Player of the Year (2014); First-team All-MAC (2014)

Scott Edward Secor (born April 3, 1992) is an American former football placekicker for the Ball State Cardinals. Finished the regular season ranked 2nd in the FBS 1-A with 25 field goals made behind Josh Lambert from WVU with 27. With 25 field goals 2014 Secor is tied for 1st place in Ball State history with the most field goals in a single season, 2014 (John Diettrich 1985 & Steven Schott 2012). With 60 extra points in 2013, Secor is 2nd in Ball States record book behind Ian McGarvey, 2008.

== High school ==
Secor made 25 out of 32 fields goals in his high school career including one for 51 yards. As a senior, he was named to the all-state second team.

== College career ==
=== 2011 season ===
After a redshirt season in 2010, Secor's played in his first college game in the 27–20 victory over Indiana University at Lucas Oil Stadium in Indianapolis, Ind. In this game Cardinal fans were introduced to new head coach Pete Lembo. Secor predominantly handles the kickoff duties for the Cardinals in 2011

=== 2012 season ===
Secor played in all 13 games, including the Beef 'O' Brady's Bowl St. Petersburg, FL. Again he handled the kickoff duties for the Cardinals. He had a season high nine kickoffs vs. Ohio for season best 510 yards. Other highlights included seven kickoffs vs Army & Indiana. And eight kickoffs vs. Eastern Michigan, at Kent State and at Central Michigan.

=== 2013 season ===
Secor made his first career field goal attempt on a 22-yarder in the 51–28 win over Illinois State. He also made six extra points vs. Illinois State in the season opener. Highlights from 2013 include six extra points and two made field goals in the 48–27 win over Virginia. Secor made 13 consecutive field goals, the second longest streak in Ball State history, before missing one in the GoDaddy Bowl. He would finish the season 19 of 21 field goals and 60 extra points.

=== 2014 season ===
Finished the regular season ranked 1st in the FBS 1-A with 25 field goals made. Secor starts all 12 games in his senior season. Highlights include five field goals and 17 points scored vs Akron. Secor made a career long 55 yard field goal to win the game in the 32–29 victory over Central Michigan. Secor punted for a single-game record of 160 yards in the 17–13 loss to Iowa. Secor recorded his longest punt of 63 yards vs Toledo. Secor was named the 2014 MAC Special Teams Player of the Year. As well as being named to the 2014 All-MAC First Team Offense.

=== College awards ===
- 2014 MAC Special Teams Player of the Year
- 2014 All-MAC First Team Offense
- Semifinalist for the 2014 Lou Groza Collegiate Placekicking Award
- 2013 All-Mid-American Conference Third Team
