= Rod Carey =

American football player and coach (born 1971)

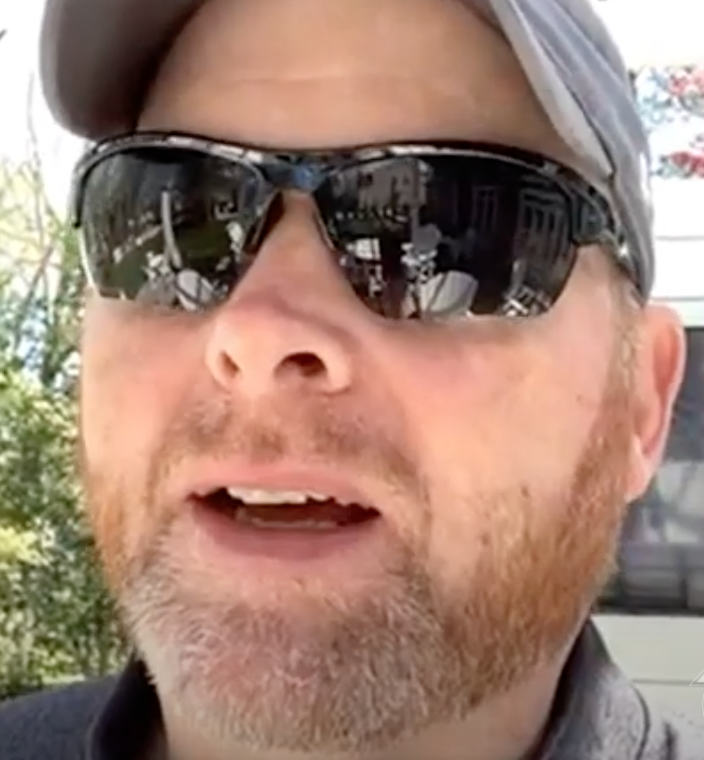
- Carey in 2020

Biographical details
- Born: July 24, 1971 (age 55); Madison, Wisconsin, U.S.

Playing career
- 1990–1993: Indiana
- Position: Center

Coaching career (HC unless noted)
- 1994–1997: Wayzata HS (MN) (assistant)
- 1998–1999: Minnesota (GA)
- 2000–2003: Wisconsin–Stout (co-OC/OL)
- 2004–2006: Wisconsin–Stout (OC/OL)
- 2007: Illinois State (OL)
- 2008–2010: North Dakota (OL)
- 2011: Northern Illinois (OL)
- 2012: Northern Illinois (OC/OL)
- 2012–2018: Northern Illinois
- 2019–2021: Temple
- 2022: Indiana (QC/OL)
- 2023: Indiana (OC/QB)

Head coaching record
- Overall: 64–50
- Bowls: 0–7

Accomplishments and honors

Championships
- 4 MAC West Division (2013–2015, 2018); 2 MAC (2014, 2018)

Awards
- MAC Coach of the Year (2013)

Roderick Charles Carey (born July 24, 1971) is an American college football coach and former player who last served as the offensive coordinator for the Indiana Hoosiers. He served as the head football coach at Northern Illinois University from 2012 to 2018 and Temple University from 2019 to 2021.

== Early years ==
Carey was born in Madison, Wisconsin and played college football as a center at Indiana University Bloomington from 1990 to 1993.

== Coaching career ==
=== Early coaching career ===
Following his playing career, Carey began his coaching career as an assistant at his alma mater, Wayzata High School in Plymouth, Minnesota, before moving to the college ranks and making stop at the University of Minnesota, the University of Wisconsin–Stout, Illinois State University, and the University of North Dakota.

=== Northern Illinois ===
Arriving at Northern Illinois University in 2008, Carey coached the offensive line for the Huskies until 2012, when he became the offensive coordinator of the team for the 2012 season. After orchestrating an offense that was No. 13 in the nation at 38.6 points per game, Carey replaced Dave Doeren after Doeren left to take the head coaching job at North Carolina State prior to the 2013 Orange Bowl.

Over the next six seasons, Carey would go 52–30 at the helm of the Huskies and won two Mid-American Conference championships and four MAC West Division titles. Carey also defeated four Big Ten Conference opponents during his tenure. He left the program in 2018 to become the new head coach for Temple Owls.

=== Temple ===
On January 10, 2019, it was announced that Carey would replace Manny Diaz as the head coach at Temple.

Carey won eight games in his first season at Temple, which was enough for the team to receive an invitation to the 2019 Military Bowl, but the Owls were blown out by North Carolina losing by a score of 55–13. The Owls struggled in the 2020 season, which was cut short by the COVID-19 pandemic, winning just one game.

The 2021 season was Carey's first with a Temple roster that was recruited almost entirely by him. However, after starting the season 3–2, Temple ended the season on a seven-game losing streak and finished with a record of 3–9. Temple lost every one of their final seven games by at least 20 points. Carey also faced accusations of losing support in the Temple locker room after multiple players, including the team's starting quarterback and number-one wide receiver, entered the transfer portal. On November 29, 2021, Temple fired Carey becoming the first Temple coach to be fired since Jerry Berndt in 1992. Prior to Carey, Temple's previous four head coaches had all left the school to become Power Five coaches.

=== Indiana ===
After joining the staff as a quality control coach before the 2022 season, Carey was appointed as Indiana's offensive line coach on October 9, 2022. He was promoted to offensive coordinator following the firing of Nick Sheridan.

== Head coaching record ==
Year	Team	Overall	Conference	Standing	Bowl/playoffs	Coaches^{#}	AP^{°}
Northern Illinois Huskies (Mid-American Conference) (2012–2018)
2012	Northern Illinois	0–1 (Note: Dave Doeren resigned after the MAC Championship Game to become head coach at NC State. Carey was named head coach on December 2 and coached the team in the Orange Bowl.)			L Orange^{†}	24	22
2013	Northern Illinois	12–2	8–0	1st (West)	L Poinsettia		
2014	Northern Illinois	11–3	7–1	T–1st (West)	L Boca Raton		
2015	Northern Illinois	8–6	6–2	T–1st (West)	L Poinsettia		
2016	Northern Illinois	5–7	5–3	3rd (West)			
2017	Northern Illinois	8–5	6–2	T–2nd (West)	L Quick Lane		
2018	Northern Illinois	8–6	6–2	1st (West)	L Boca Raton		
Northern Illinois:		52–30	38–10				
Temple Owls (American Athletic Conference) (2019–2021)
2019	Temple	8–5	5–3	3rd (East)	L Military		
2020	Temple	1–6	1–6	10th			
2021	Temple	3–9	1–7	T–9th			
Temple:		12–20	7–16				
Total:		64–50					
National championship Conference title Conference division title or championship game berth
^{†}Indicates BCS bowl.; ^{#}Rankings from final Coaches Poll.; ^{°}Rankings from final AP Poll.
