= UMass Minutemen football statistical leaders =

The UMass Minutemen football statistical leaders are individual statistical leaders of the UMass Minutemen football program in various categories, including passing, rushing, receiving, total offense, defensive stats, and kicking. Within those areas, the lists identify single-game, single-season, and career leaders. As of the current 2025 season, the Minutemen represent the University of Massachusetts Amherst in the NCAA Division I FBS Mid-American Conference.

Although UMass began competing in intercollegiate football in 1879, the school's official record book does not generally include entries from before the 1960s, as records from before this period are often incomplete and inconsistent.

These lists are dominated by more recent players for several reasons:

- Since the 1960s, seasons have increased from 10 games to 11 and then 12 games in length.
- The NCAA didn't allow freshmen to play varsity football until 1972 (with the exception of the World War II years), allowing players to have four-year careers.

These lists are updated through the end of the 2025 season.

== Passing ==
=== Passing yards ===
Career
Rk	Player	Yards	Years
1	Liam Coen	11,031	2004 2005 2006 2007 2008
2	Todd Bankhead	7,018	1998 1999
3	Andrew Ford	6,955	2016 2017 2018
4	Blake Frohnapfel	6,264	2014 2015
5	Dave Palazzi	5,461	1985 1986 1987 1988
6	Jeff Krohn	4,993	2002 2003
7	Peil Pennington	4,687	1971 1972 1973
8	Kyle Havens	3,786	2009 2010
9	Tim Day	3,334	2002 2003 2004 2005
10	Greg Landry	3,131	1965 1966 1967

Single season
Rk	Player	Yards	Year
1	Todd Bankhead	3,919	1998
2	Blake Frohnapfel	3,345	2014
3	Todd Bankhead	3,099	1999
4	Liam Coen	3,091	2007
5	Liam Coen	3,016	2006
6	Jeff Krohn	2,961	2003
7	Andrew Ford	2,924	2017
8	Blake Frohnapfel	2,919	2015
9	Liam Coen	2,749	2008
10	Kyle Havens	2,692	2010

Single game
Rk	Player	Yards	Year	Opponent
1	Blake Frohnapfel	589	2014	Bowling Green
2	Ross Comis	540	2018	Liberty
3	Kyle Havens	450	2010	New Hampshire
4	Blake Frohnapfel	438	2014	Toledo
5	Blake Frohnapfel	424	2014	Ball State
6	Liam Coen	421	2007	Southern Illinois
7	Liam Coen	419	2007	Fordham
8	Blake Frohnapfel	409	2015	Bowling Green
9	Matt Guice	403	2001	New Hampshire
10	Jeff Krohn	401	2002	Northeastern
	Liam Coen	401	2005	New Hampshire

=== Passing touchdowns ===
Career
Rk	Player	TDs	Years
1	Liam Coen	90	2004 2005 2006 2007 2008
2	Andrew Ford	57	2016 2017 2018
3	Todd Bankhead	51	1998 1999
4	Jeff Krohn	44	2002 2003
5	Blake Frohnapfel	39	2014 2015
6	Peil Pennington	38	1971 1972 1973
7	Dave Palazzi	32	1985 1986 1987 1988
8	Tim Day	27	2002 2003 2004 2005
9	Noel Reebenacker	23	1950 1951 1952
10	Jerry Welchel	21	1962 1963 1964 1965

Single season
Rk	Player	TDs	Year
1	Todd Bankhead	34	1998
2	Liam Coen	30	2007
3	Jeff Krohn	28	2003
4	Liam Coen	26	2006
5	Andrew Ford	26	2016
6	Liam Coen	24	2008
7	Tim Day	23	2004
	Blake Frohnapfel	23	2014
9	Andrew Ford	22	2017
10	Noel Reebenacker	20	1952
	Kyle Havens	20	2010

Single game
Rk	Player	TDs	Year	Opponent
1	Mike Fallon	5	1977	Youngstown
	Todd Bankhead	5	1998	Maine
	Richard Lucero	5	2000	New Haven
	Matt Guice	5	2001	James Madison
	Liam Coen	5	2006	Towson
	Liam Coen	5	2008	Bryant
	Blake Frohnapfel	5	2014	Bowling Green
	Blake Frohnapfel	5	2014	Toledo
	Andrew Ford	5	2017	Ohio

== Rushing ==
=== Rushing yards ===
Career
Rk	Player	Yards	Years
1	Marcel Shipp	6,250	1997 1998 1999 2000
2	Steve Baylark	5,332	2003 2004 2005 2006
3	Rene Ingoglia	4,623	1992 1993 1994 1995
4	Garry Pearson	3,859	1979 1980 1981 1982
5	Marquis Young	3,618	2015 2016 2017 2018
6	Frank Alessio	2,887	1993 1994 1995 1996
7	Tony Nelson	2,787	2005 2006 2007 2008 2009
8	Jonathan Hernandez	2,627	2008 2009 2010 2011
9	Kevin Smellie	2,228	1985 1986 1987 1988
10	Jerome Bledsoe	2,216	1988 1989 1990 1991

Single season
Rk	Player	Yards	Year
1	Marcel Shipp	2,542	1998
2	Steve Baylark	1,960	2006
3	Marcel Shipp	1,846	1999
4	Garry Pearson	1,631	1982
5	Matt Lawrence	1,585	2007
6	Jerome Bledsoe	1,545	1991
7	Rene Ingoglia	1,505	1994
8	Tony Nelson	1,325	2008
9	Rene Ingoglia	1,284	1993
10	Frank Alessio	1,276	1995

Single game
Rk	Player	Yards	Year	Opponent
1	Frank Alessio	337	1995	Boston University
2	Rene Ingoglia	313	1994	Rhode Island
3	Garry Pearson	288	1982	AIC
4	Marcel Shipp	270	1998	Maine
5	Paul Metallo	258	1971	Holy Cross
6	Marcel Shipp	257	1998	Connecticut
7	Marcel Shipp	256	1999	Maine
8	Marcel Shipp	244	1998	Georgia Southern
9	Kevin Quinlan	241	2000	Northeastern
10	Marquis Young	240	2015	Buffalo

=== Rushing touchdowns ===
Career
Rk	Player	TDs	Years
1	Marcel Shipp	58	1997 1998 1999 2000
2	Rene Ingoglia	54	1992 1993 1994 1995
3	Steve Baylark	42	2003 2004 2005 2006
4	Garry Pearson	35	1979 1980 1981 1982
5	Lou Bush	34	1931 1932 1933
6	Jonathan Hernandez	29	2008 2009 2010 2011
	Marquis Young	29	2015 2016 2017 2018
8	Tony Nelson	25	2005 2006 2007 2008 2009
9	Greg Landry	22	1965 1966 1967
10	Kevin Smellie	21	1985 1986 1987 1988

Single season
Rk	Player	TDs	Year
1	Marcel Shipp	24	1999
2	Rene Ingoglia	19	1995
3	Marcel Shipp	18	1998
4	Lou Bush	17	1931
5	Matt Lawrence	16	2007
6	Paul Metallo	15	1972
	Garry Pearson	15	1980
	Steve Baylark	15	2006
9	Lou Bush	14	1932
	Rene Ingoglia	14	1993
	Rene Ingoglia	14	1994
	R. J. Cobbs	14	2002

Single game
Rk	Player	TDs	Year	Opponent
1	Lou Bush	5	1932	Cooper Union
	R. J. Cobbs	5	2002	Rhode Island

== Receiving ==
=== Receptions ===
Career
Rk	Player	Rec	Years
1	Tajae Sharpe	277	2012 2013 2014 2015
2	Andy Isabella	231	2015 2016 2017 2018
3	Adrian Zullo	187	1998 1999 2000 2001
4	J. J. Moore	185	2003 2004 2005 2006
5	Julian Talley	162	2008 2009 2010 2011
6	Brandon London	148	2003 2004 2005 2006
7	Victor Cruz	131	2005 2006 2007 2008
8	Marcel Shipp	126	1997 1998 1999 2000
9	Jason Peebler	123	2001 2002 2003 2004
10	Rob Blanchflower	109	2009 2010 2011 2012

Single season
Rk	Player	Rec	Year
1	Tajae Sharpe	111	2015
2	Andy Isabella	102	2018
3	Jimmy Moore	92	1998
4	Tajae Sharpe	85	2014
5	Adrian Zullo	81	1999
6	J. J. Moore	80	2007
7	Kerry Taylor	74	1998
8	Victor Cruz	71	2008
9	Adam Breneman	70	2016
10	Andy Isabella	65	2017

Single game
Rk	Player	Rec	Year	Opponent
1	Tajae Sharpe	15	2015	FIU
	Andy Isabella	15	2018	Georgia
3	J. J. Moore	13	2005	Colgate
	Brandon London	13	2005	Hofstra
	Victor Cruz	13	2008	James Madison
	Tajae Sharpe	13	2014	Bowling Green
	Tajae Sharpe	13	2014	Eastern Michigan
	Tajae Sharpe	13	2014	Ball State
	Tajae Sharpe	13	2015	Bowling Green
	Andy Isabella	13	2018	South Florida

=== Receiving yards ===
Career
Rk	Player	Yards	Years
1	Andy Isabella	3,526	2015 2016 2017 2018
2	Tajae Sharpe	3,486	2012 2013 2014 2015
3	Adrian Zullo	2,892	1998 1999 2000 2001 2002
4	J. J. Moore	2,420	2003 2004 2005 2006 2007
5	Jason Peebler	2,395	2001 2002 2003 2004
6	Julian Talley	2,090	2008 2009 2010 2011
7	Brandon London	2,022	2003 2004 2005 2006
8	Victor Cruz	1,958	2005 2006 2007 2008 2009
9	Rasheed Rancher	1,794	2003 2004 2005 2006 2007
10	Chip Mitchell	1,684	1986 1987 1988 1989

Single season
Rk	Player	Yards	Year
1	Andy Isabella	1,698	2018
2	Jimmy Moore	1,494	1998
3	Tajae Sharpe	1,319	2015
4	Tajae Sharpe	1,281	2014
5	Adrian Zullo	1,253	1999
6	J. J. Moore	1,100	2007
7	Victor Cruz	1,064	2008
8	Andy Isabella	1,020	2017
9	Rasheed Rancher	1,007	2007
10	Jason Peebler	1,003	2003

Single game
Rk	Player	Yards	Year	Opponent
1	Andy Isabella	303	2018	Liberty
2	Victor Cruz	262	2008	James Madison
3	Tajae Sharpe	239	2014	Ball State
4	Andy Isabella	219	2018	Georgia
5	Adrian Zullo	210	1999	Richmond
6	Rasheed Rancher	198	2007	Fordham
	Andy Isabella	198	2018	Ohio
8	Tajae Sharpe	193	2014	Eastern Michigan
9	Andy Isabella	191	2018	South Florida
10	Anthony Nelson	190	2010	New Hampshire

=== Receiving touchdowns ===
Career
Rk	Player	TDs	Years
1	Adrian Zullo	32	1998 1999 2000 2001 2002
2	Andy Isabella	30	2015 2016 2017 2018
3	Jason Peebler	27	2001 2002 2003 2004
4	Jimmy Moore	16	1998
	Rasheed Rancher	16	2003 2004 2005 2006 2007
	Tajae Sharpe	16	2012 2013 2014 2015
7	Tim Berra	15	1971 1972 1973
	Brandon London	15	2003 2004 2005 2006
	J. J. Moore	15	2003 2004 2005 2006 2007
10	Chip Mitchell	14	1986 1987 1988 1989

Single season
Rk	Player	TDs	Year
1	Jimmy Moore	16	1998
2	Jason Peebler	13	2003
	Andy Isabella	13	2018
4	Tim Berra	12	1973
5	Jason Peebler	10	2004
	Andy Isabella	10	2017
7	Steve Schubert	9	1972
	Adrian Zullo	9	1999
	Adrian Zullo	9	2002
	Brandon London	9	2006
	Rasheed Rancher	9	2007

Single game
Rk	Player	TDs	Year	Opponent
1	Jimmy Moore	4	1998	Connecticut
	Adrian Zullo	4	1999	New Hampshire
	Brandon London	4	2006	Towson

== Total offense ==
Total offense is the sum of passing and rushing statistics. It does not include receiving or returns.

=== Total offense yards ===
Career
Rk	Player	Yards	Years
1	Liam Coen	10,871	2004 2005 2006 2007 2008
2	Todd Bankhead	6,821	1998 1999
3	Dave Palazzi	6,725	1985 1986 1987 1988
4	Andrew Ford	6,658	2016 2017 2018
5	Marcel Shipp	6,250	1997 1998 1999 2000
6	Blake Frohnapfel	6,233	2014 2015
7	Steve Baylark	5,350	2003 2004 2005 2006
8	Peil Pennington	4,907	1971 1972 1973
9	Jeff Krohn	4,816	2002 2003
10	Greg Landry	4,763	1965 1966 1967

Single season
Rk	Player	Yards	Year
1	Todd Bankhead	3,756	1998
2	Blake Frohnapfel	3,261	2014
3	Todd Bankhead	3,065	1999
4	Liam Coen	2,997	2007
5	Blake Frohnapfel	2,972	2015
6	Liam Coen	2,954	2006
7	Jeff Krohn	2,860	2003
8	Dave Palazzi	2,802	1988
9	Andrew Ford	2,787	2017
10	Liam Coen	2,741	2008

Single game
Rk	Player	Yards	Year	Opponent
1	Blake Frohnapfel	570	2014	Bowling Green
2	Ross Comis	566	2018	Liberty
3	Kyle Havens	434	2010	New Hampshire
4	Blake Frohnapfel	431	2014	Ball State
	Blake Frohnapfel	431	2014	Toledo
6	Liam Coen	419	2007	Fordham
7	Matt Guice	416	2001	New Hampshire
8	Dave Palazzi	407	1988	New Hampshire
9	Liam Coen	406	2007	Southern Illinois
	Andrew Ford	406	2017	Ohio

=== Total touchdowns ===
Career
Rk	Player	TDs	Years
1	Liam Coen	93	2004 2005 2006 2007 2008
2	Todd Bankhead	64	1998 1999
3	Andrew Ford	61	2016 2017 2018
4	Marcel Shipp	58	1997 1998 1999 2000
5	Rene Ingoglia	54	1992 1993 1994 1995
6	Peil Pennington	51	1971 1972 1973
7	Dave Palazzi	49	1985 1986 1987 1988

Single season
Rk	Player	TDs	Year
1	Todd Bankhead	41	1998
2	Liam Coen	30	2007
3	Jeff Krohn	28	2003
	Andrew Ford	28	2016
5	Liam Coen	26	2006
	Liam Coen	26	2008
7	Tim Day	25	2004
8	Peil Pennington	24	1973
	Marcel Shipp	24	1999
	Andrew Ford	24	2017

== Defense ==
=== Interceptions ===
Career
Rk	Player	Ints	Years
1	Shannon James	20	2001 2002 2003 2004 2005
2	Steven Rogers	18	1967 1968 1969
	Grady Fuller	18	1980 1981 1982 1983
4	Don Caparotti	17	1989 1990 1991 1992
5	Jeremy Robinson	15	1997 1998 1999 2000 2001
6	Kevin Sullivan	14	1977 1978 1979
7	Dwayne Lopes	13	1980 1981 1982
	Breon Parker	13	1993 1994 1995
	Tracy Belton	13	2003 2004 2005 2006
10	Jerard White	12	1996 1997 1998 1999
	Steve Costello	12	2001 2002 2003 2004 2005

Single season
Rk	Player	Ints	Year
1	Don Junkins	8	1952
	Steven Rogers	8	1968
	John Beerworth	8	1978
	Kevin Sullivan	8	1978
	Shannon James	8	2004
6	Steven Rogers	7	1969
	Don Caparotti	7	1992
	Breon Parker	7	1993
	Jerard White	7	1999

Single game
Rk	Player	Ints	Year	Opponent
1	Steven Rogers	4	1968	Delaware

=== Tackles ===
Career
Rk	Player	Tackles	Years
1	John McKeown	543	1985 1986 1987 1988
2	Khari Samuel	495	1995 1996 1997 1998
3	Kole Ayi	478	1997 1998 1999 2000
4	Vito Perrone	465	1984 1985 1986 1987
5	Jeremy Cain	363	1999 2000 2001 2002 2003
6	Tyler Holmes	361	2008 2009 2010 2011
7	Jason Hatchell	360	2003 2004 2005 2006 2007
8	Justin Riemer	358	1993 1994 1995 1996
9	Perry McIntyre	354	2009 2010 2011 2012
10	Shannon James	341	2001 2002 2003 2004 2005

Single season
Rk	Player	Tackles	Year
1	John McKeown	177	1988
2	Kole Ayi	165	1998
3	Khari Samuel	160	1998
4	George Karelas	150	1989
	Justin Riemer	150	1995
6	Kole Ayi	147	1999
7	Justin Riemer	144	1996
8	Jovan Santos-Knox	143	2014
9	Joe McLaughlin	142	1978
10	George Karelas	140	1988

Single game
Rk	Player	Tackles	Year	Opponent
1	John McKeown	23	1986	Delaware
	Charles Walker	23	2004	Delaware
2	Bryton Barr	21	2018	Charlotte
	Kole Ayi	21	1998	New Hampshire
3	Jovan Santos-Knox	20	2015	Toledo

=== Sacks ===
Career
Rk	Player	Sacks	Years
1	Mario Perry	33.0	1989 1990 1992 1993
2	Todd Rundle	31.5	1984 1985 1986 1987
3	Brian Corcoran	30.0	1991 1992 1993 1994
4	Matthew Tulley	26.0	1988 1989 1990 1991
5	Valdamar Brower	24.0	1999 2000 2001 2002 2003
6	David Burris	22.0	2003 2004 2005 2006 2007
7	Rich Kane	21.0	1989 1990 1991
8	Khari Samuel	19.0	1995 1996 1997 1998
9	Scott Assencoa	18.0	1990 1991 1992 1993
	Mike Ziccardi	18.0	2001 2002 2003

Single season
Rk	Player	Sacks	Year
1	Mario Perry	15.0	1992
2	Brian Corcoran	13.0	1994
3	Mike Dwyer	12.5	1985
4	Todd Rundle	12.0	1987
	Brian Corcoran	12.0	1993
6	Todd Rundle	10.0	1986
	Mike Ziccardi	10.0	2002
8	Todd Rundle	9.5	1985
	Valdamar Brower	9.5	2001
	David Burris	9.5	2007

Single game
Rk	Player	Sacks	Year	Opponent
1	Scott Assencoa	5.0	1992	Connecticut

== Kicking ==
=== Field goals made ===
Career
Rk	Player	FGs	Years
1	Cameron Carson	32	2020 2021 2022 2023
2	Armando Cuko	31	2005 2006 2007 2008 2009
3	Silvio Bonvini	30	1985 1986 1987 1988
4	Sandro Vitiello	29	1978 1979
5	Doug White	27	1999 2000 2001 2002
	Chris Koepplin	27	2006 2007
7	Eric Oke	26	1993 1994 1995 1996

Single season
Rk	Player	FGs	Year
1	Armando Cuko	19	2009
2	Sandro Vitiello	16	1978
	Chris Koepplin	16	2006
4	Eric Oke	14	1993
5	Sandro Vitiello	13	1979
	Cameron Carson	13	2022
	Jacob Lurie	13	2024
8	Chris Koepplin	11	2007
	Cameron Carson	11	2023
10	George Papoutsidis	10	1983
	Silvio Bonvini	10	1986
	Eric Oke	10	1994
	Doug White	10	2000
	Derek Morris	10	2025

Single game
Rk	Player	FGs	Year	Opponent
1	George Papoutsidis	4	1984	Ball State
	Brendon Levengood	4	2013	Northern Illinois

=== Field goal percentage ===
Career
Rk	Player	FG%	Years
1	Brendon Levengood	81.0%	2009 2010 2011 2012 2013
2	Cooper Garcia	80.0%	2018 2019
3	Doug White	77.1%	1999 2000 2001 2002
4	Chris Koepplin	71.1%	2006 2007
5	Armando Cuko	68.9%	2005 2006 2007 2008 2009
6	Jason Cherry	68.2%	1998 1999 2000 2001

Single season
Rk	Player	FG%	Year
1	Doug White	90.9%	2000
2	Cooper Garcia	81.8%	2018
3	David Croasdale	80.0%	1975
	Doug White	80.0%	2002
5	Armando Cuko	79.2%	2009
6	Cooper Garcia	77.8%	2019
7	Silvio Bonvini	76.9%	1986
