= Andy Isabella =

American gridiron football player (born 1996)

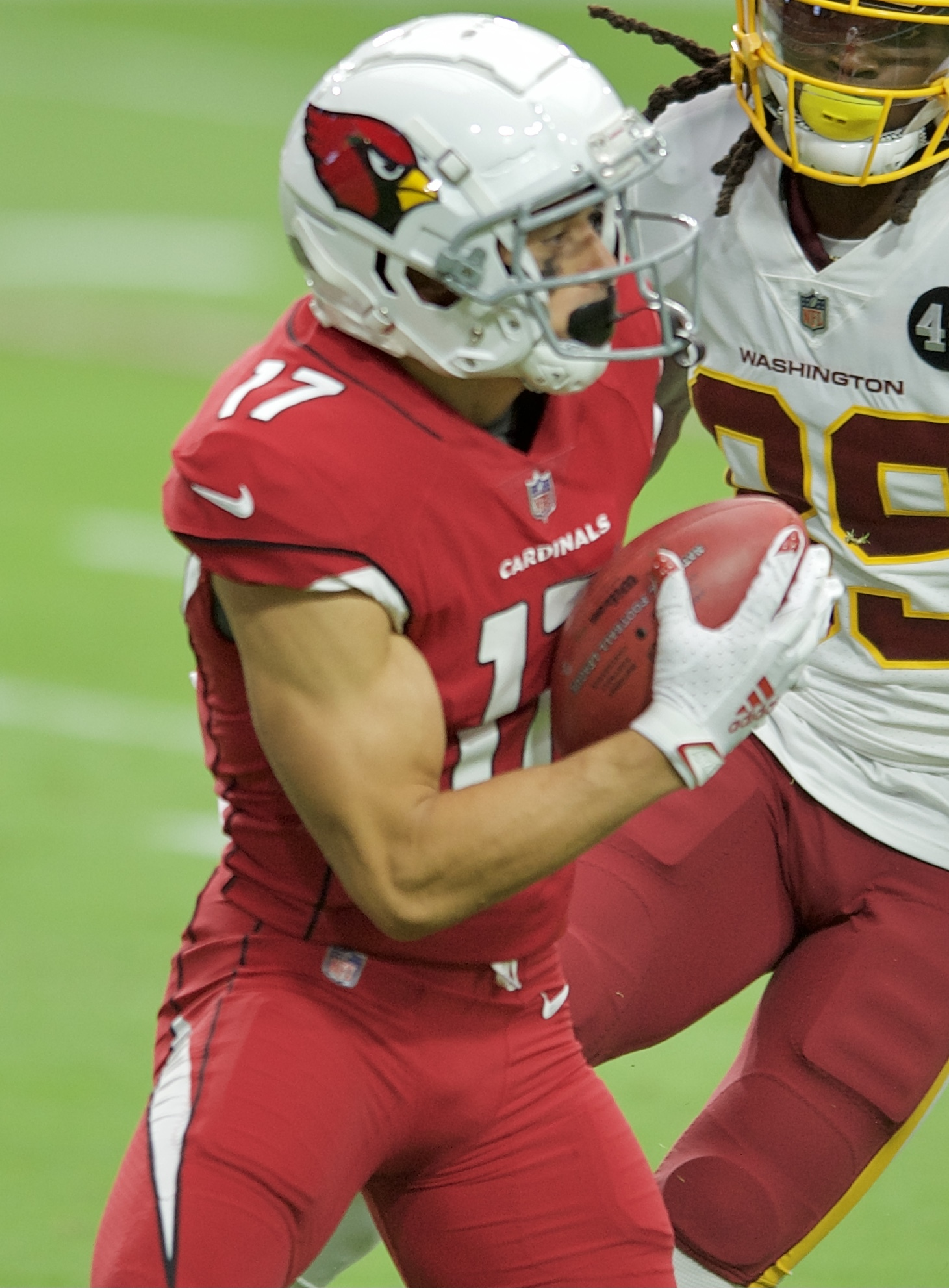
- Isabella with the Arizona Cardinals in 2020

Profile
- Position: Wide receiver

Personal information
- Born: November 18, 1996 (age 29); Mayfield, Ohio, U.S.
- Listed height: 5 ft 9 in (1.75 m)
- Listed weight: 186 lb (84 kg)

Career information
- High school: Mayfield
- College: UMass (2015–2018)
- NFL draft: 2019: 2nd round, 62nd overall pick

Career history
- Arizona Cardinals (2019–2022); Baltimore Ravens (2022); Buffalo Bills (2023); Pittsburgh Steelers (2024)*; St. Louis Battlehawks (2025)*; San Francisco 49ers (2025)*; Ottawa Redblacks (2026)*
- * Offseason or practice squad member only

Awards and highlights
- Consensus All-American (2018)

Career NFL statistics
- Receptions: 33
- Receiving yards: 447
- Receiving touchdowns: 3
- Stats at Pro Football Reference

Andy Isabella (born November 18, 1996) is an American professional football wide receiver. He played college football for the UMass Minutemen, and was selected by the Arizona Cardinals in the second round of the 2019 NFL draft.

== Early life ==
Isabella attended Mayfield High School in Mayfield, Ohio. Isabella ran track in high school. In his senior year of high school, Isabella won the state title in the 100-meter dash, beating fellow sprinter and future Cleveland Browns cornerback Denzel Ward in a close race. He committed to the University of Massachusetts to play college football. Isabella is of Italian heritage.

== College career ==
Isabella played at UMass from 2015 to 2018. Initially recruited as a running back, he converted to wide receiver his sophomore year. During his career he had 231 receptions for 3,526 yards and 30 touchdowns. As a senior, he was an All-American and was a finalist for the Fred Biletnikoff Award.

In 2018, he led the country in receiving yards per game (141.5) and was named to the 2018 College Football All-America Team. Isabella was Pro Football Focus's highest rated wide receiver in college football, posting a season grade of 93.2.

== Professional career ==
=== Pre-draft ===
Pre-draft measurables
Height	Weight	Arm length	Hand span	Wingspan	40-yard dash	10-yard split	20-yard split	20-yard shuttle	Three-cone drill	Vertical jump	Broad jump	Bench press
5 ft 8 3/4 in (1.75 m)	188 lb (85 kg)	29 3/4 in (0.76 m)	8 3/8 in (0.21 m)	5 ft 11 1/2 in (1.82 m)	4.31 s	1.45 s	2.61 s	4.15 s	6.95 s	36.5 in (0.93 m)	10 ft 1 in (3.07 m)	15 reps
All values from NFL Combine

Isabella declared for the 2019 NFL draft after his senior season. At the combine, Isabella ran a 4.31 second 40 yard dash, which was the third fastest time at that year's combine, tied with Ohio State wide receiver Parris Campbell.

=== Arizona Cardinals ===
Isabella was drafted by the Arizona Cardinals with the 62nd overall pick in the second round of the draft. The Cardinals acquired this selection in a trade that sent Josh Rosen to the Miami Dolphins. In Week 9 against the San Francisco 49ers, Isabella caught one pass for an 88-yard touchdown in the 28-25 loss. This was Isabella's first career receiving touchdown in the NFL. He finished his rookie season with nine receptions for 189 receiving yards and one receiving touchdown.

In Week 3 of the 2020 season, Isabella recorded four receptions for 47 receiving yards and two touchdowns in the 26–23 loss to the Detroit Lions.

Isabella entered the 2021 season sixth on the Cardinals wide receiver depth chart, and only had one catch the entire season and was inactive for half the season.

On October 4, 2022, the Cardinals waived Isabella.

=== Baltimore Ravens ===
On October 10, 2022, Isabella signed with the practice squad of the Baltimore Ravens. On December 31, Isabella was elevated to Baltimore's active roster for their Week 17 game against the Pittsburgh Steelers. On January 2, 2023, Isabella was placed back on Baltimore's practice squad after a thigh injury in the game. On January 14, Isabella was elevated to Baltimore's active roster again for their playoff game against the Cincinnati Bengals.

Isabella signed a reserve/future contract with Baltimore on January 19, 2023. He was released by the Ravens on July 25.

=== Buffalo Bills ===
On July 28, 2023, Isabella signed with the Buffalo Bills. He was waived on August 29, and re-signed to the practice squad. During the season, Isabella played in only two regular season games, and two playoff games. He signed a reserve/future contract with Buffalo on January 22, 2024. Isabella was released by the Bills on August 27.

=== St. Louis Battlehawks (first stint) ===
On October 2, 2024, Isabella signed with the St. Louis Battlehawks of the United Football League (UFL).

=== Pittsburgh Steelers ===
On October 25, 2024, Isabella signed with the Pittsburgh Steelers' practice squad. He was released by the Steelers on November 5.

=== St. Louis Battlehawks (second stint) ===
Isabella was re-signed by the Battlehawks on December 20, 2024. He was released by the Battlehawks on March 20, 2025.

=== San Francisco 49ers ===
On July 31, 2025, Isabella signed with the San Francisco 49ers. He was released by San Francisco on August 5.

=== Ottawa Redblacks ===
On February 12, 2026, it was announced that Isabella had signed with the Ottawa Redblacks of the Canadian Football League. On May 2, Isabella took to Instagram to announce that he was not going to play for Ottawa after an injury.

== Career statistics ==
=== NFL ===
Year	Team	Games		Receiving					Rushing					Fumbles	
Year	Team	GP	GS	Rec	Yds	Avg	Lng	TD	Att	Yds	Avg	Lng	TD	Fum	Lost
2019	ARI	**15**	1	9	189	**21.0**	**88**	1	**4**	**15**	**3.8**	**6**	0	0	0
2020	ARI	13	**2**	**21**	**224**	10.7	54	**2**	1	-6	-6.0	-6	0	**1**	**1**
2021	ARI	8	0	1	13	13.0	13	0	0	0	0.0	0	0	0	0
2022	ARI	3	0	2	21	10.5	11	0	0	0	0.0	0	0	0	0
2022	BAL	2	0	0	0	0.0	0	0	1	1	1.0	1	0	0	0
2023	BUF	2	0	0	0	0.0	0	0	0	0	0.0	0	0	0	0
Career		41	3	33	447	13.5	88	3	6	10	1.7	6	0	1	1

=== College ===
Legend
	Led NCAA Division I FBS
**Bold**	Career high

Year	Team	Games		Receiving				Rushing				Kick returns				Punt returns			
Year	Team	GP	GS	Rec	Yds	Avg	TD	Att	Yds	Avg	TD	Ret	Yds	Avg	TD	Ret	Yds	Avg	TD
2015	UMass	9	1	2	7	3.5	0	3	28	9.3	0	**17**	**315**	18.5	0	0	0	0.0	0
2016	UMass	**12**	10	62	801	12.9	7	12	100	8.3	0	1	14	14.0	0	0	0	0.0	0
2017	UMass	**12**	**12**	65	1,020	15.7	10	**14**	**135**	**9.6**	**1**	5	114	**22.8**	0	2	22	**11.0**	0
2018	UMass	**12**	**12**	**102**	**1,698**	**16.6**	**13**	11	79	7.2	**1**	0	0	0.0	0	**7**	**55**	7.9	0
Career		45	35	231	3,526	15.3	30	40	342	8.6	2	23	443	19.3	0	9	77	8.6	0

== Coaching career ==
Isabella signed with Athletes Untapped as a private football coach on September 8, 2025.
