= Tajae Sharpe =

American football player (born 1994)

Tajaé Sharpe
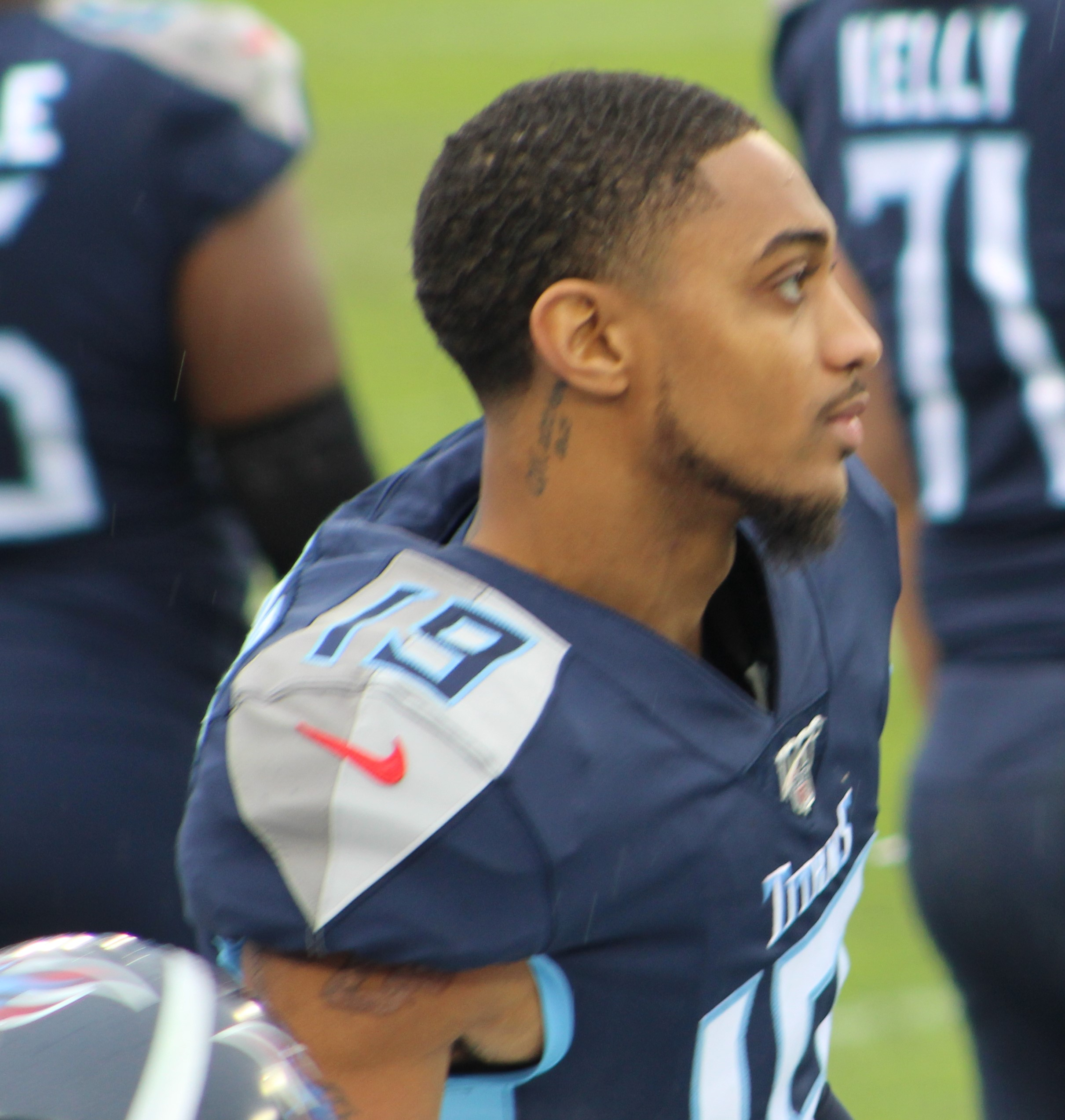
- Sharpe with the Tennessee Titans in 2019

No. 19, 11, 4, 83
- Position: Wide receiver

Personal information
- Born: December 23, 1994 (age 31); Newark, New Jersey, U.S.
- Listed height: 6 ft 2 in (1.88 m)
- Listed weight: 194 lb (88 kg)

Career information
- High school: Piscataway Township (Piscataway, New Jersey)
- College: UMass
- NFL draft: 2016: 5th round, 140th overall pick

Career history
- Tennessee Titans (2016–2019); Minnesota Vikings (2020); Kansas City Chiefs (2020–2021)*; Atlanta Falcons (2021); Chicago Bears (2022)*; San Francisco 49ers (2022)*
- * Offseason or practice squad member only

Awards and highlights
- Second-team All-American (2015); NCAA receptions leader (2015); First-team All-MAC (2015)

Career NFL statistics
- Receptions: 117
- Receiving yards: 1,397
- Receiving touchdowns: 8
- Stats at Pro Football Reference

Tajaé Lamar Sharpe (born December 23, 1994) is an American former professional football player who was a wide receiver in the National Football League (NFL). He played college football for the UMass Minutemen, earning second-team All-American honors in 2015. Sharpe was selected by the Tennessee Titans in the fifth round of the 2016 NFL draft. He was also a member of the Minnesota Vikings, Kansas City Chiefs, Atlanta Falcons, Chicago Bears, and San Francisco 49ers.

== Early life ==
Sharpe attended Piscataway Township High School in Piscataway, New Jersey and played football and basketball. He was a two-star recruit by Rivals.com and committed to the University of Massachusetts (UMass) to play college football.

== College career ==
As a freshman in 2012, Sharpe had 20 receptions for 206 yards in 11 games and eight starts.

As a sophomore in 2013, Sharpe led the team with 61 receptions for 680 yards and four touchdowns.

As a junior in 2014, Sharpe once again led the team with 85 receptions for 1,281 yards and seven touchdowns.

As a senior in 2015, Sharpe broke UMass records for career receptions and receiving yards, finishing the season with 111 receptions for 1,319 yards and five touchdowns.

Sharpe majored in communications.

== Professional career ==
Pre-draft measurables
Height	Weight	Arm length	Hand span	40-yard dash	10-yard split	20-yard split	Vertical jump	Broad jump	Bench press
6 ft 2 in (1.88 m)	194 lb (88 kg)	32 1/4 in (0.82 m)	8 3/8 in (0.21 m)	4.55 s	1.55 s	2.61 s	33.5 in (0.85 m)	9 ft 6 in (2.90 m)	11 reps
All values from NFL Combine

=== Tennessee Titans ===
==== 2016 season ====
Sharpe was selected by the Tennessee Titans in the fifth round (140th overall) of the 2016 NFL draft. On May 9, 2016, he signed a four-year, $2.61 million contract with a signing bonus of $274,884.

Throughout training camp, Sharpe competed with Andre Johnson, Dorial Green-Beckham, and Kendall Wright for a starting wide receiver position. He was named one of the starting wide receivers, opposite Rishard Matthews, going into the regular season.

Sharpe made his NFL debut and first NFL start in the season-opener against the Minnesota Vikings. He finished the 25–16 loss with seven receptions for 76 yards. During a Week 10 47–25 victory over the Green Bay Packers, Sharpe caught three passes for 68 yards and his first NFL touchdown on a 33-yard reception from Marcus Mariota in the third quarter. In the next game against the Indianapolis Colts, Sharpe had four receptions for 68 yards and a 34-yard touchdown pass during the 24–17 road loss.

Sharpe finished his rookie year with 41 receptions for 522 yards and two touchdowns in 16 games and 10 starts. The Titans tripled their win total from the previous year, finishing with a 9–7 record, but did not qualify for the playoffs.

==== 2017 season ====
On September 2, 2017, Sharpe was placed on injured reserve with a foot injury, ending his season before it even started. Without Sharpe, the Titans finished with a 9–7 record and qualified for the playoffs. However, their season ended after they lost on the road to the New England Patriots in the Divisional Round.

==== 2018 season ====
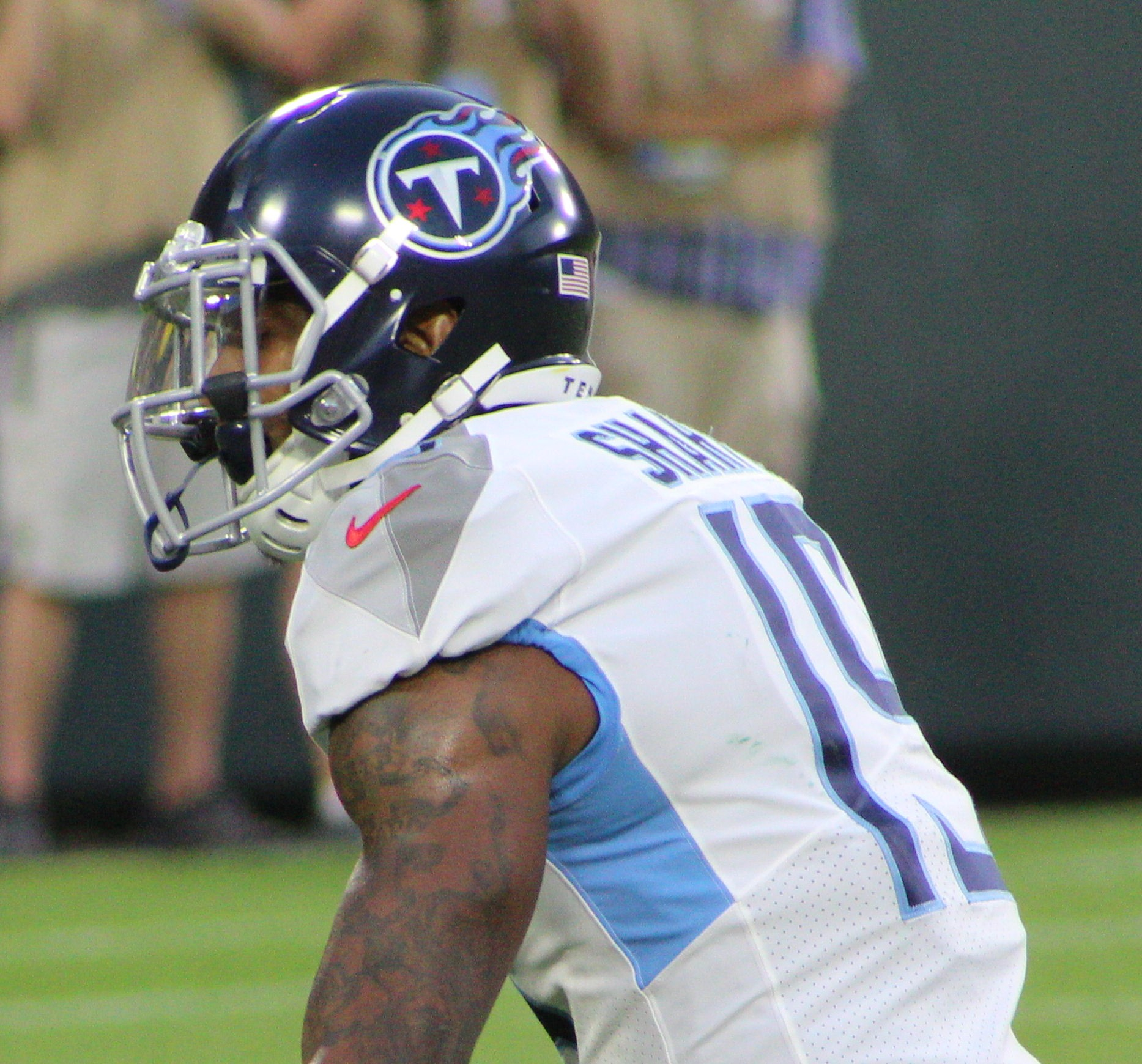
Sharpe in 2018

Sharpe returned from his injury in time for the Titans' season-opening 27–20 road loss to the Miami Dolphins, recording a 17-yard reception. Three weeks later against the Philadelphia Eagles, Sharpe had three receptions for 27 yards and his first touchdown of the season in the 26–23 overtime victory.

During a narrow Week 7 20–19 loss to the Los Angeles Chargers in London, Sharpe matched his single-game career-high in receptions with seven and also gained a new career-high in receiving yards with 101. During Week 11 against the Colts, Sharpe caught five passes for 37 yards and a touchdown in the 38–10 road loss.

Sharpe finished the 2018 season with 26 receptions for 316 yards and two touchdowns in 16 games and 13 starts. The Titans finished with a third straight 9–7 season and did not qualify for the playoffs.

==== 2019 season ====
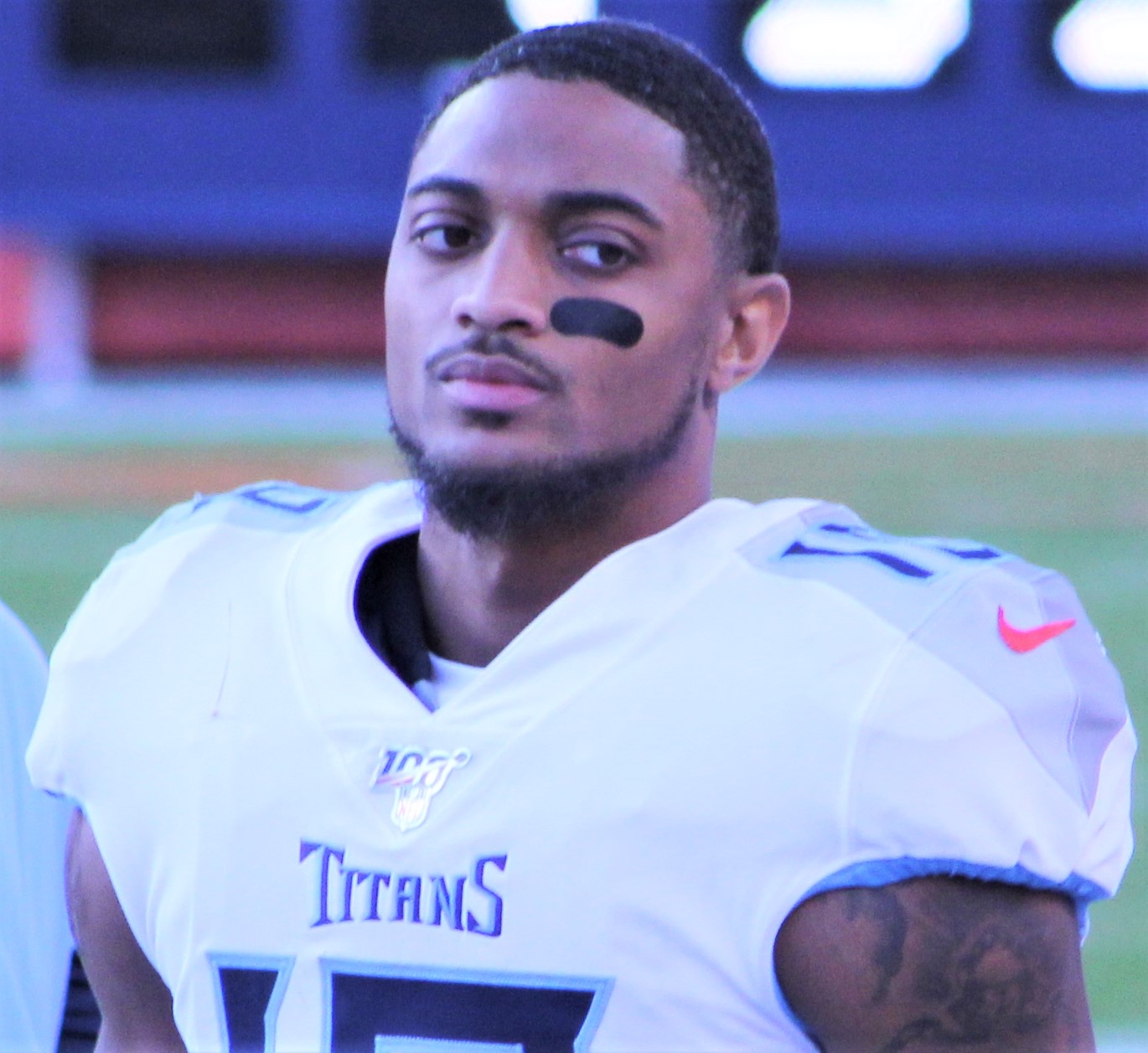
Sharpe in 2019

During a Week 7 23–20 victory over the Chargers, Sharpe recorded two receptions for 19 yards and his first touchdown of the season on a five-yard pass from Ryan Tannehill. In the next game against the Tampa Bay Buccaneers, Sharpe caught three passes for 18 yards and a touchdown during the 27–23 victory. He did not play in Week 13 against the Colts due to a hamstring injury. During Week 16 against the New Orleans Saints, Sharpe had five receptions for 69 yards and two touchdowns in the 38–28 loss.

Sharpe finished the 2019 season with 25 receptions for 329 yards and a career-high four touchdowns in 15 games and six starts. The Titans finished with a fourth straight 9–7 season, qualifying for the playoffs and advancing to the AFC Championship Game where they lost to the eventual Super Bowl Champions, the Kansas City Chiefs. Sharpe played in all three postseason games, recording a six-yard reception during the Wild Card Round against the Patriots and starting in the AFC Championship Game.

=== Minnesota Vikings ===
On March 25, 2020, Sharpe signed a one-year contract with the Minnesota Vikings. He was waived on December 14.

=== Kansas City Chiefs ===
On December 22, 2020, the Kansas City Chiefs signed Sharpe to their practice squad. His practice squad contract with the team expired after the season on February 16, 2021.

Sharpe re-signed with the Chiefs on April 9, 2021. However, he was waived on May 17.

=== Atlanta Falcons ===
On May 24, 2021, Sharpe signed with the Atlanta Falcons. He played in 15 games with seven starts, recording 25 receptions for 230 yards.

=== Chicago Bears ===
On May 12, 2022, Sharpe signed with the Chicago Bears. After head coach Matt Eberflus announced that Sharpe would miss the entire 2022 season with a rib injury, he was placed on injured reserve on August 31. Sharpe was released nine days later.

=== San Francisco 49ers ===
The San Francisco 49ers hosted Sharpe for a workout on October 31, 2022. He was signed to their practice squad exactly a week later. Sharpe was released on November 23.

== Career statistics ==
=== NFL ===
==== Regular season ====
Year	Team	Games		Receiving					Rushing					Fumbles	
Year	Team	GP	GS	Rec	Yds	Avg	Lng	TD	Att	Yds	Avg	Lng	TD	Fum	Lost
2016	TEN	**16**	10	**41**	**522**	12.7	34	2	**1**	1	1.0	1	0	0	0
2017	TEN	0	0	Did not play due to injury											
2018	TEN	**16**	**13**	26	316	12.2	28	2	**1**	**16**	**16.0**	**16**	0	0	0
2019	TEN	15	6	25	329	**13.2**	**47**	**4**	0	0	0.0	0	0	0	0
2020	MIN	4	0	0	0	0.0	0	0	0	0	0.0	0	0	0	0
2021	ATL	15	7	25	230	9.2	17	0	0	0	0.0	0	0	0	0
Career		66	36	117	1,397	11.9	47	8	2	17	8.5	16	0	0	0

==== Postseason ====
Year	Team	Games		Receiving					Rushing					Fumbles	
Year	Team	GP	GS	Rec	Yds	Avg	Lng	TD	Att	Yds	Avg	Lng	TD	Fum	Lost
2017	TEN	0	0	Did not play due to injury											
2019	TEN	3	1	1	6	6.0	6	0	0	0	0.0	0	0	0	0
Career		3	1	1	6	6.0	6	0	0	0	0.0	0	0	0	0

=== College ===
Legend
	Led the NCAA
**Bold**	Career high

Season	Team	GP	Receiving				Rushing			
Season	Team	GP	Rec	Yds	Avg	TD	Att	Yds	Avg	TD
2012	UMass	11	20	206	10.3	0	0	0	0.0	0
2013	UMass	12	61	680	11.1	4	0	0	0.0	0
2014	UMass	12	85	1,281	**15.1**	**7**	**3**	**14**	**4.7**	0
2015	UMass	12	**111**	**1,319**	11.9	5	1	-3	-3.0	0
Career		47	277	3,486	12.6	16	4	11	2.8	0

== Personal life ==
Sharpe's grandmother, Cozy Little, is a breast cancer survivor who was initially diagnosed in 2001.

Sharpe also has a rap career, under the name Show. As of June 6, 2021, he has released four full-length studio albums; First Quarter, released in 2019, Credentials and Delay of Game, both released in 2020, and Overtime, released in 2021.

== Legal issues ==
On May 10, 2017, Sharpe and teammate Sebastian Tretola were named as defendants in a federal civil lawsuit that alleges the teammates were at a Nashville bar watching the 2017 NFL draft. Dante R. Satterfield, the plaintiff in the lawsuit, claims that he told Sharpe he would probably lose playing time as a result of the Titans selecting wide receiver Corey Davis in the first round. The report alleges Sharpe responded by challenging him to a fight in a back alley and was accompanied by Tretola as a lookout. Satterfield claims that he was knocked unconscious for 12 hours and suffered both a concussion and facial fractures from the incident, and is suing for $500,000 in damages as a result.
