= Jeff Krohn =

American football player (born 1980)

Profile
- Position: Quarterback

Personal information
- Born: September 23, 1980 (age 46); Winnipeg, Manitoba, Canada
- Listed height: 6 ft 3 in (1.91 m)
- Listed weight: 216 lb (98 kg)

Career information
- High school: Horizon (Scottsdale, Arizona)
- College: Arizona State (1999–2001); UMass (2002–2003)
- NFL draft: 2004: undrafted

Career history
- Toronto Argonauts (2004)*; Pittsburgh Steelers (2005)*
- * Offseason or practice squad member only

Awards and highlights
- Second-team All-Atlantic 10 (2003)

Jeffrey Lee Krohn (born September 23, 1980) is an American former college football quarterback who played for the Arizona State Sun Devils and UMass Minutemen.

== Early life ==
Jeffrey Lee Krohn was born on September 23, 1980, in Winnipeg, Manitoba, Canada. He was born in Canada because his father, Jim Krohn, was a quarterback for the Winnipeg Blue Bombers of the Canadian Football League (CFL). Jeff was a three-year letterman in football at Horizon High School in Scottsdale, Arizona and earned all-conference honors all three seasons. He also made the varsity basketball team his sophomore year.

== College career ==
Krohn enrolled at Arizona State University to play college football for the Sun Devils. He redshirted the 1999 season and was a two-year letterman from 2000 to 2001. He joined the team as a walk-on but earned a scholarship in 2000.

Krohn opened the 2000 season as Arizona State's starting quarterback due to senior Ryan Kealy having a knee injury and a drug suspension. Krohn missed two games due to mononucleosis. He played in ten games, starting nine, overall in 2000, completing 119 of 244 passes (48.8%) for 1,677 yards, 12 touchdowns, and five interceptions. Krohn played in ten games in 2001, recording 115 completions on 213 passing attempts (54.0%) for 1,942 yards, 19 touchdowns, and seven interceptions while also scoring one rushing touchdown. He became the fastest Sun Devil to reach 1,000 yards in a season, doing so in only four games. He led the Pac-12 Conference in yards-per-attempt (9.1) and passer rating (153.4).

In December 2000, after the 2000 season, Krohn announced that he was transferring to the University of Massachusetts Amherst (UMass), who played in NCAA Division I-AA. He reportedly had differences with head coach Dirk Koetter. Krohn, despite having interest from other schools, said he signed with UMass because he "just wanted to make the decision quickly and get it over with". He was a two-year letterman for the Minutemen from 2002 to 2003, finishing his UMass career with 4,993 passing yards and 44 passing touchdowns. He was a team co-captain in 2003 and earned second-team All-Atlantic 10 Conference honors.

== Professional career ==
Krohn signed with the CFL's Toronto Argonauts after going undrafted in the 2004 NFL draft. He was released on May 24, 2004.

Krohn was signed by the Pittsburgh Steelers on February 1, 2005. He was allocated to NFL Europe to play for the Berlin Thunder. However, he never played for the Thunder because he was released by the Steelers on March 16, 2005 after failing a physical.

== See also ==
- Arizona State Sun Devils football statistical leaders
- UMass Minutemen football statistical leaders
