= 2018 UMass Minutemen football team =

American college football season

2018 UMass Minutemen football
- Conference: Independent
- Record: 4–8
- Head coach: Mark Whipple (11th season)
- Offensive scheme: Pro-style
- Defensive coordinator: Ed Pinkham (2nd season)
- Base defense: 4–3
- Home stadium: Warren McGuirk Alumni Stadium

2018 NCAA Division I FBS independents football records
	Conf.			Overall
Team	W		L	W		L
No. 5 Notre Dame ^		–		12	–	1
No. 19 Army		–		11	–	2
BYU		–		7	–	6
Liberty		–		6	–	6
UMass		–		4	–	8
New Mexico State		–		3	–	9
^ – College Football Playoff participant; Rankings from AP Poll

The 2018 UMass Minutemen football team represented the University of Massachusetts Amherst in the 2018 NCAA Division I FBS football season. This was the fifth year of head coach Mark Whipple's second stint at UMass and 11th year overall. The Minutemen divided their home schedule between two stadiums. Five home games were played at the UMass campus at Warren McGuirk Alumni Stadium with one home game at Gillette Stadium. This was UMass's third year as an independent. They finished the season 4–8.

On November 21, head coach Mark Whipple resigned. He finished with a record of 16–44 in the five years of his second stint as head coach and 65–70 in his eleven overall seasons. On December 3, the school hired Florida State offensive coordinator Walt Bell for the head coaching job.

UMass wide receiver Andy Isabella was named a consensus All-American at year's end.

== Preseason ==
=== Award watch lists ===
Listed in the order that they were released

Award	Player	Position	Year
Davey O'Brien Award	Andrew Ford	QB	SR
Doak Walker Award	Marquis Young	RB	SR
Fred Biletnikoff Award	Andy Isabella	WR	SR
Butkus Award	Bryton Barr	LB	SR
Paul Hornung Award	Andy Isabella	WR/KR	SR
Wuerffel Trophy	Andrew Ford	QB	SR
Wuerffel Trophy	Andy Isabella	WR	SR
Manning Award	Andrew Ford	QB	SR

== Schedule ==
Date	Time	Opponent	Site	TV	Result	Attendance
August 25	5:30 p.m.	Duquesne (FCS)	Warren McGuirk Alumni Stadium; Hadley, MA	ELVN	W 63–15	8,684
September 1	1:00 p.m.	at Boston College	Alumni Stadium; Chestnut Hill, MA (rivalry)	ACCN Extra	L 21–55	30,112
September 8	6:00 p.m.	at Georgia Southern	Paulson Stadium; Statesboro, GA	ESPN+	L 13–34	15,071
September 15	7:30 p.m.	at FIU	Riccardo Silva Stadium; Miami, FL	beIN	L 24–63	14,695
September 22	3:30 p.m.	Charlotte	Warren McGuirk Alumni Stadium; Hadley, MA	ELVN	W 49–31	10,086
September 29	2:00 p.m.	at Ohio	Peden Stadium; Athens, OH	ESPN3	L 42–58	19,056
October 6	3:30 p.m.	South Florida	Warren McGuirk Alumni Stadium; Hadley, MA	ELVN	L 42–58	7,988
October 20	3:30 p.m.	Coastal Carolina	Warren McGuirk Alumni Stadium; Hadley, MA	ELVN	L 13–24	11,134
October 27	12:00 p.m.	at UConn	Rentschler Field; East Hartford, CT (rivalry)	ESPNU	W 22–17	24,150
November 3	3:30 p.m.	Liberty^{†}	Warren McGuirk Alumni Stadium; Hadley, MA	ELVN	W 62–59 ^{3OT}	10,338
November 10	12:00 p.m.	BYU	Gillette Stadium; Foxborough, MA	ELVN	L 16–35	14,082
November 17	4:00 p.m.	at No. 5 Georgia	Sanford Stadium; Athens, GA (SEC Nation)	SECN	L 27–66	92,746
^{†}Homecoming; Rankings from AP Poll released prior to the game; All times are in Eastern time

Schedule source:

☆All Eleven Sports broadcasts will be simulcast on NESN or NESN+.

== Game summaries ==
=== Duquesne ===
	1	2	3	4	Total
Dukes	3	6	0	6	15
Minutemen	21	14	21	7	63

The Minutemen's game against Duquesne was the first of the 2018 college football season, kicking off 90 minutes before Prairie View A&M–Rice.

Scoring summary

Quarter	Time	Drive			Team	Scoring information	Score	
Quarter	Time	Plays	Yards	TOP	Team	Scoring information	DUQ	UMass
1	13:57	1	32	0:08	UMass	Brennon Dingle 32-yard touchdown reception from Andrew Ford, Mike Caggiano kick good	0	7
1	11:35	2	77	0:45	UMass	Andy Isabella 60-yard touchdown reception from Ross Comis, Cooper Garcia kick good	0	14
1	6:20	8	87	3:01	UMass	Bilal Ally 1-yard touchdown run, Mike Caggiano kick good	0	21
1	0:50	6	28	2:58	DUQ	32-yard field goal by Mitch MacZura	3	21
2	14:30	5	75	1:20	UMass	Andy Isabella 14-yard touchdown run, Cooper Garcia kick good	3	28
2	3:12	12	62	4:19	UMass	Marquis Young 2-yard touchdown run, Mike Caggiano kick good	3	35
2	0:05	9	66	3:07	DUQ	Nehari Crawford 5-yard touchdown reception from Daniel Parr, 2-point pass failed	9	35
3	12:22	6	54	2:38	UMass	Andy Isabella 44-yard touchdown reception from Andrew Ford, Cooper Garcia kick good	9	42
3	10:09				UMass	Interception returned 60 yards for touchdown by Brice McAlister, Mike Caggiano kick good	9	49
3	3:33	8	81	3:40	UMass	Ross Comis 1-yard touchdown run, Cooper Garcia kick good	9	56
4	10:27	17	71	2:55	DUQ	Daniel Parr 2-yard touchdown run, Mitch MacZura kick failed	15	56
4	7:42	7	87	2:43	UMass	Zak Simon 14-yard touchdown reception from Ross Comis, Mike Caggiano kick good	15	63
"TOP" = time of possession. For other American football terms, see Glossary of American football.							15	63

=== At Boston College ===
	1	2	3	4	Total
Minutemen	7	0	0	14	21
Eagles	14	34	0	7	55

=== At Georgia Southern ===
	1	2	3	4	Total
Minutemen	3	7	3	0	13
Eagles	0	17	10	7	34

=== At FIU ===
	1	2	3	4	Total
Minutemen	7	3	14	0	24
Panthers	14	28	14	7	63

=== Charlotte ===
	1	2	3	4	Total
49ers	0	10	7	14	31
Minutemen	28	7	7	7	49

=== At Ohio ===
	1	2	3	4	Total
Minutemen	21	7	7	7	42
Bobcats	14	21	17	6	58

=== South Florida ===
	1	2	3	4	Total
Bulls	10	10	28	10	58
Minutemen	7	7	14	14	42

=== Coastal Carolina ===
	1	2	3	4	Total
Chanticleers	3	0	14	7	24
Minutemen	3	3	7	0	13

=== At UConn ===
	1	2	3	4	Total
Minutemen	3	0	6	13	22
Huskies	7	0	7	3	17

=== Liberty ===
	1	2	3	4	OT	2OT	3OT	Total
Flames	14	10	0	21	7	7	0	59
Minutemen	14	10	7	14	7	7	3	62

=== BYU ===
	1	2	3	4	Total
Cougars	7	7	14	7	35
Minutemen	10	0	0	6	16

=== At Georgia ===
	1	2	3	4	Total
Minutemen	7	6	7	7	27
No. 5 Bulldogs	14	28	17	7	66

== Players drafted into the NFL ==
Round	Pick	Player	Position	NFL Club
2	62	Andy Isabella	WR	Arizona Cardinals
