= 2013 UMass Minutemen football team =

American college football season

2013 UMass Minutemen football
- Conference: Mid-American Conference
- East Division
- Record: 1–11 (1–7 MAC)
- Head coach: Charley Molnar (2nd season)
- Offensive coordinator: John Bond (1st season)
- Offensive scheme: Spread/pistol
- Defensive coordinator: Phil Elmassian (2nd season)
- Base defense: 4–3
- Home stadium: Gillette Stadium

2013 Mid-American Conference football standings
	Conf.			Overall
Team	W		L	W		L
East Division
Bowling Green x$	7	–	1	10	–	4
Buffalo	6	–	2	8	–	5
Ohio	4	–	4	7	–	6
Akron	4	–	4	5	–	7
Kent State	3	–	5	4	–	8
UMass	1	–	7	1	–	11
Miami (OH)	0	–	8	0	–	12
West Division
Northern Illinois x	8	–	0	12	–	2
Ball State	7	–	1	10	–	3
Toledo	5	–	3	7	–	5
Central Michigan	5	–	3	6	–	6
Eastern Michigan	1	–	7	2	–	10
Western Michigan	1	–	7	1	–	11
Championship: Bowling Green 47, Northern Illinois 27
$ – Conference champion; x – Division champion/co-champions

The 2013 UMass Minutemen football team represented the University of Massachusetts Amherst in the 2013 NCAA Division I FBS football season as a member of the East Division of the Mid-American Conference. The team was coached by Charley Molnar in his second year and played its home games at Gillette Stadium in Foxborough, Massachusetts.

The 2013 season marked the team's second season as a member of the MAC, and also marked the first season in which the Minutemen were eligible for the conference championship as well as post-season bowl play. For the second straight year the Minutemen finished the season with an overall record of 1–11 with a Conference record of 1–7 which placed them in 6th place in the MAC East Division. At the end of the season Tackle Anthony Dima, a senior, was honored as an All-MAC Third Team selection. Molnar was later fired on December 26 after a second consecutive 1–11 season. He was replaced by Mark Whipple.

== Recruits ==
College recruiting (2013)
Name	Hometown	School	Height	Weight	40^{‡}	Commit date
Peter Angeh; DE	Potomac, Maryland	Bullis School	6 ft 3 in (1.91 m)	245 lb (111 kg)	–	Dec 31, 2012
Peter Angeh; DE	Recruit ratings: Scout: Rivals: (NR)					
Enock Asante; DT	Trenton, New Jersey	Steinert H.S.	6 ft 2 in (1.88 m)	260 lb (120 kg)	–	Feb 6, 2013
Enock Asante; DT	Recruit ratings: Scout: Rivals: (NR)					
Josh Bruns; OL	Glendale, Arizona	Glendale CC JC	6 ft 5 in (1.96 m)	290 lb (130 kg)	–	Jan 4, 2013
Josh Bruns; OL	Recruit ratings: Scout: Rivals: (NR)					
E.J. Burston; WR	Bradenton, Florida	Palmetto H.S.	6 ft 3 in (1.91 m)	170 lb (77 kg)	–	Feb 6, 2013
E.J. Burston; WR	Recruit ratings: Scout: Rivals: (NR)					
Steve Casali; LB	Farmingville, New York	Sachem East H.S.	6 ft 2 in (1.88 m)	225 lb (102 kg)	–	Feb 6, 2013
Steve Casali; LB	Recruit ratings: Scout: Rivals: (63)					
Terrel Correia; OT	Nantucket, Massachusetts	Nantucket H.S.	6 ft 7 in (2.01 m)	280 lb (130 kg)	–	Jul 2, 2012
Terrel Correia; OT	Recruit ratings: Scout: Rivals: (68)					
Sharif Custis; TE	Philadelphia, Pennsylvania	St. John Neumann	6 ft 3 in (1.91 m)	215 lb (98 kg)	–	Feb 6, 2013
Sharif Custis; TE	Recruit ratings: Scout: Rivals: (NR)					
Shaquille Harris; WR	Palmetto, Florida	Palmetto H.S.	6 ft 2 in (1.88 m)	185 lb (84 kg)	–	Feb 6, 2013
Shaquille Harris; WR	Recruit ratings: Scout: Rivals: (NR)					
Tyshon Henderson; OL	Middletown, Rhode Island	St. George's School	6 ft 6 in (1.98 m)	300 lb (140 kg)	–	Jul 6, 2012
Tyshon Henderson; OL	Recruit ratings: Scout: Rivals: (62)					
Fabian Höller; OL	Cologne, Germany	FOS Ansbach	6 ft 3 in (1.91 m)	301 lb (137 kg)	–	Feb 6, 2013
Fabian Höller; OL	Recruit ratings: Scout: Rivals: (NR)					
Shane Huber; LB	Jersey City, New Jersey	St. Peter's Prep	6 ft 3 in (1.91 m)	225 lb (102 kg)	–	Jan 30, 2013
Shane Huber; LB	Recruit ratings: Scout: Rivals: (72)					
DaQuan Mack; RB	Fairless Hills, Pennsylvania	Pennsbury H.S.	6 ft 1 in (1.85 m)	245 lb (111 kg)	–	Sep 4, 2012
DaQuan Mack; RB	Recruit ratings: Scout: Rivals: (NR)					
Peter Ngobidi; DE	West Roxbury, Massachusetts	Catholic Memorial	6 ft 1 in (1.85 m)	210 lb (95 kg)	–	Jul 15, 2012
Peter Ngobidi; DE	Recruit ratings: Scout: Rivals: (69)					
Jordan Page; OL	Pennington, New Jersey	Pennington Prep	6 ft 5 in (1.96 m)	302 lb (137 kg)	–	Jul 12, 2012
Jordan Page; OL	Recruit ratings: Scout: Rivals: (64)					
Jackson Porter; DB	Ellicott City, Maryland	Mt. Hebron H.S.	6 ft 1 in (1.85 m)	185 lb (84 kg)	–	Feb 6, 2013
Jackson Porter; DB	Recruit ratings: Scout: Rivals: (NR)					
Richard Queen; G	Oradell, New Jersey	Bergen Catholic	6 ft 4 in (1.93 m)	265 lb (120 kg)	–	Jul 30, 2012
Richard Queen; G	Recruit ratings: Scout: Rivals: (64)					
Todd Stafford; QB	Greenwich, Connecticut	Greenwich H.S.	6 ft 6 in (1.98 m)	240 lb (110 kg)	–	Mar 16, 2012
Todd Stafford; QB	Recruit ratings: Scout: Rivals: (70)					
Elijah Wilkinson; DL	Downingtown, Pennsylvania	Downingtown West H.S.	6 ft 4 in (1.93 m)	330 lb (150 kg)	–	Feb 6, 2013
Elijah Wilkinson; DL	Recruit ratings: Scout: Rivals: (NR)					
Arthur Williams; S	Sebring, Florida	Sebring H.S.	6 ft 3 in (1.91 m)	190 lb (86 kg)	–	Feb 6, 2013
Arthur Williams; S	Recruit ratings: Scout: Rivals: (NR)					
Lorenzo Woodley; RB	Miami, Florida	Columbus H.S.	6 ft 0 in (1.83 m)	210 lb (95 kg)	–	Feb 7, 2013
Lorenzo Woodley; RB	Recruit ratings: Scout: Rivals: (76)					
D.J. Woods; WR	Fort Lauderdale, Florida	University School	5 ft 10 in (1.78 m)	160 lb (73 kg)	–	Jul 6, 2012
D.J. Woods; WR	Recruit ratings: Scout: Rivals: (73)					
Sam Zeff; OL	Montclair, New Jersey	Montclair H.S.	6 ft 5 in (1.96 m)	277 lb (126 kg)	–	Jul 1, 2012
Sam Zeff; OL	Recruit ratings: Scout: Rivals: (68)					
Overall recruit ranking:
Note: In many cases, Scout, Rivals, 247Sports, On3, and ESPN may conflict in their listings of height and weight.; In these cases, the average was taken. ESPN grades are on a 100-point scale.; Sources:

== Schedule ==
Date	Time	Opponent	Site	TV	Result	Attendance
August 31	12:00 p.m.	at No. 23 Wisconsin*	Camp Randall Stadium; Madison, WI	BTN	L 0–45	76,306
September 7	2:00 p.m.	Maine*	Gillette Stadium; Foxborough, MA	ESPN3	L 14–24	15,624
September 14	7:00 p.m.	at Kansas State*	Bill Snyder Family Football Stadium; Manhattan, KS	K-StateHD.TV	L 7–37	52,894
September 21	12:00 p.m.	Vanderbilt*	Gillette Stadium; Foxborough, MA	ESPNews	L 7–24	16,419
October 5	3:30 p.m.	at Bowling Green	Doyt Perry Stadium; Bowling Green, OH	BCSN	L 7–28	13,799
October 12	3:00 p.m.	Miami (OH)	Gillette Stadium; Foxborough, MA	ESPN3	W 17–10	21,707
October 19	3:30 p.m.	at Buffalo	University at Buffalo Stadium; Amherst, NY (rivalry)	TWCS	L 3–32	18,707
October 26	3:00 p.m.	Western Michigan^{†}	Gillette Stadium; Foxborough, MA	ESPN3	L 30–31	20,571
November 2	12:00 p.m.	No. 21 Northern Illinois	Gillette Stadium; Foxborough, MA	ESPN+	L 19–63	10,061
November 16	1:00 p.m.	Akron	Gillette Stadium; Foxborough, MA	ESPN3	L 13–14	10,599
November 23	1:00 p.m.	at Central Michigan	Kelly/Shorts Stadium; Mount Pleasant, MI	ESPN3	L 0–37	8,763
November 29	2:00 p.m.	at Ohio	Peden Stadium; Athens, OH	ESPN3	L 23–51	13,162
*Non-conference game; ^{†}Homecoming; Rankings from AP Poll released prior to the game; All times are in Eastern time

== Transfers In ==
Player	Position	Year	Previous School
Ricardo Miller	WR/TE	Senior	Michigan
Justin Anderson	DE/DT	Senior	Maryland
David Osei	OL	Senior	Rutgers

- Note: Miller, Anderson and Osei were immediately eligible to play the 2013 season without sitting out one season per NCAA eligibility rules. All three athletes achieved their undergraduate degrees and still had one season of eligibility left. They are all enrolled as graduate students in the UMass Graduate School of Education.

== Game summaries ==
=== @ Wisconsin ===
	1	2	3	4	Total
Minutemen	0	0	0	0	0
#23 Badgers	10	7	21	7	45

=== Maine ===
	1	2	3	4	Total
Black Bears	3	7	14	0	24
Minutemen	7	0	0	7	14

=== @ Kansas State ===
	1	2	3	4	Total
Minutemen	7	0	0	0	7
Wildcats	6	21	7	3	37

=== Vanderbilt ===
	1	2	3	4	Total
Commodores	7	3	0	14	24
Minutemen	0	7	0	0	7

=== @ Bowling Green ===
	1	2	3	4	Total
Minutemen	0	0	0	7	7
Falcons	0	14	14	0	28

=== Miami (OH) ===
	1	2	3	4	Total
RedHawks	0	7	3	0	10
Minutemen	7	0	7	3	17

=== @ Buffalo ===
	1	2	3	4	Total
Minutemen	0	3	0	0	3
Bulls	0	13	5	14	32

=== Western Michigan ===
	1	2	3	4	Total
Broncos	3	14	7	7	31
Minutemen	7	14	3	6	30

=== Northern Illinois ===
	1	2	3	4	Total
#21 Huskies	21	21	7	14	63
Minutemen	6	7	6	0	19

=== Akron ===
	1	2	3	4	Total
Zips	7	0	7	0	14
Minutemen	3	3	7	0	13

=== @ Central Michigan ===
	1	2	3	4	Total
Minutemen	0	0	0	0	0
Chippewas	7	20	7	3	37

=== @ Ohio ===
	1	2	3	4	Total
Minutemen	3	7	10	3	23
Bobcats	14	17	10	10	51

== Team players selected in the 2014 NFL draft ==
NFL Draftees
Name	Position	Round	Pick	NFL team	Ref.
Rob Blanchflower	Tight End	7	230	Pittsburgh Steelers	
