= Steve Baylark =

American football player (born 1983)

No. 26, 33
- Position: Running back

Personal information
- Born: July 28, 1983 (age 43); Aberdeen, Mississippi, U.S.
- Listed height: 6 ft 0 in (1.83 m)
- Listed weight: 206 lb (93 kg)

Career information
- High school: Apopka (Apopka, Florida)
- College: UMass
- NFL draft: 2007: undrafted

Career history
- Arizona Cardinals (2007–2008)*; Denver Broncos (2008)*; Sacramento Mountain Lions (2010–2011)
- * Offseason or practice squad member only

Awards and highlights
- Second-team I-AA All-American (2006); Second-team All-A-10 (2003); 3× First-team All-A-10 (2004–2006); A-10 Co-Offensive P.O.Y. (2006); UMass Athletics Hall of Fame (2021)

Steve Ray Baylark (born July 28, 1983) is an American former football player. He was signed by the Arizona Cardinals as an undrafted free agent in 2007. He went to high school at Apopka High School and played college football for the UMass Minutemen. Baylark is a member of the UMass Athletics Hall of Fame.

Baylark was also a member of the Denver Broncos and Sacramento Mountain Lions.

== College career ==
Baylark played college football at the University of Massachusetts Amherst from 2003 to 2006. He was only the third player to rush for 1,000 yards in four consecutive seasons in the history of I-AA football. As a senior in 2006, Baylark rushed for 1,960 yards and 15 touchdowns on the way to a National Championship Game appearance. He was named the 2006 Atlantic 10 Co-Offensive Player of the Year and also earned All-American honors. He participated in the 82nd Annual East-West Shrine Game as a member of the East squad which was coached by Don Shula.
