= 2015 UMass Minutemen football team =

American college football season

2015 UMass Minutemen football
- Conference: Mid-American Conference
- East Division
- Record: 3–9 (2–6 MAC)
- Head coach: Mark Whipple (8th season)
- Offensive scheme: Pro-style
- Defensive coordinator: Tom Masella (4th season)
- Base defense: 3–4
- Home stadium: Gillette Stadium; Warren McGuirk Alumni Stadium

2015 Mid-American Conference football standings
	Conf.			Overall
Team	W		L	W		L
East Division
Bowling Green x$	7	–	1	10	–	4
Ohio	5	–	3	8	–	5
Akron	5	–	3	8	–	5
Buffalo	3	–	5	5	–	7
Kent State	2	–	6	3	–	9
Miami (OH)	2	–	6	3	–	9
UMass	2	–	6	3	–	9
West Division
Northern Illinois xy	6	–	2	8	–	6
Western Michigan x	6	–	2	8	–	5
Toledo x	6	–	2	10	–	2
Central Michigan x	6	–	2	7	–	6
Ball State	2	–	6	3	–	9
Eastern Michigan	0	–	8	1	–	11
Championship: Bowling Green 34, Northern Illinois 14
$ – Conference champion; x – Division champion/co-champions; y – Championship game participant

The 2015 UMass Minutemen football team represented the University of Massachusetts Amherst in the 2015 NCAA Division I FBS football season. This was their second year with head coach Mark Whipple. The Minutemen divided their home schedule between two stadiums. Three home games were played at Gillette Stadium in Foxborough, Massachusetts and the other three games were played on the UMass campus at Warren McGuirk Alumni Stadium. This season was UMass's fourth and last in the Mid-American Conference within the East Division. They finished the season 3–9, 2–6 in MAC play to finish in a three way tie for fifth place in the East Division.

== Schedule ==
Date	Time	Opponent	Site	TV	Result	Attendance
September 12	2:00 p.m.	at Colorado*	Folsom Field; Boulder, CO	P12N	L 14–48	35,094
September 19	3:00 p.m.	Temple*	Gillette Stadium; Foxboro, MA	ESPN3	L 23–25	10,141
September 26	3:30 p.m.	at No. 6 Notre Dame*	Notre Dame Stadium; Notre Dame, IN	NBC	L 27–62	80,795
October 3	3:00 p.m.	FIU*	Warren McGuirk Alumni Stadium; Hadley, MA	ESPN3	W 24–14	13,525
October 10	2:00 p.m.	at Bowling Green	Doyt Perry Stadium; Bowling Green, OH	ESPN3	L 38–62	17,118
October 17	3:00 p.m.	Kent State^{†}	Warren McGuirk Alumni Stadium; Hadley, MA	ESPN3	L 10–15	15,217
October 24	3:00 p.m.	No. 19 Toledo	Gillette Stadium; Foxboro, MA	ESPN3	L 35–51	12,793
October 31	1:00 p.m.	at Ball State	Scheumann Stadium; Muncie, IN	ESPN3	L 10–20	4,576
November 7	12:00 p.m.	Akron	Gillette Stadium; Foxboro, MA	CBSSN	L 13–17	6,228
November 14	3:00 p.m.	at Eastern Michigan	Rynearson Stadium; Ypsilanti, MI	ESPN3	W 28–17	2,759
November 21	1:00 p.m.	Miami (OH)	Warren McGuirk Alumni Stadium; Hadley, MA	ESPN3	L 13–20	8,839
November 27	4:30 p.m.	at Buffalo	University at Buffalo Stadium; Amherst, NY (rivalry)	ESPNU	W 31–26	15,648
*Non-conference game; ^{†}Homecoming; Rankings from AP Poll released prior to the game; All times are in Eastern time

Schedule source:

== Game summaries ==
=== Colorado ===
	1	2	3	4	Total
Minutemen	7	7	0	0	14
Buffaloes	14	17	17	0	48

=== Temple ===
	1	2	3	4	Total
Owls	7	10	3	5	25
Minutemen	0	17	0	6	23

=== Notre Dame ===
	1	2	3	4	Total
Minutemen	6	14	0	7	27
#6 Fighting Irish	14	21	20	7	62

=== FIU ===
	1	2	3	4	Total
Panthers	0	7	7	0	14
Minutemen	7	10	0	7	24

=== Bowling Green ===
UMass Minutemen (1-3) at Bowling Green Falcons (3-2) – Game summary

Quarter	1	2	3	4	Total
Massachusetts	10	7	14	7	38
Bowling Green	14	14	24	10	62

at Doyt Perry Stadium • Bowling Green, OH

- Date: October 10, 2015
- Game time: 2:00 p.m.
- Game weather: Temperature: 61 °F (16 °C) • Wind: SW 2 mph (3.2 km/h) • Weather: Sunny
- Game attendance: 17,118
- Referee: Mark Kluczynski • Umpire: Tony Smith • Linesman: Rudy Studd • Line judge: John Swartz • Back judge: T. Ripenhoff • Field judge: Kevin Sullivan • Side judge: Lewis Garrison
- TV announcers (ESPN3): Jim Barbar (play–by–play), John Gregory (color)

Game information

First quarter

- (11:11) BGSU – Derek Lee 2 yard pass from Matt Johnson (Tyler Tate kick) (Drive: 11 plays, 75 yards, 3:49; Bowling Green 7–0)
- (7:50) UMASS – Logan Laurent 22 yard field goal (Drive: 11 plays, 70 yards, 3:21; Bowling Green 7–3)
- (1:28) UMASS – Shakur Nesmith 15 yard pass from Blake Frohnapfel (Logan Laurent kick) (Drive: 11 plays, 82 yards, 4:29; UMass 10–7)
- (00:00) BGSU – Ronnie Moore 71 yard pass from Matt Johnson (Tyler Tate kick) (Drive: 5 plays, 91 yards, 1:21; Bowling Green 14–10)

Second quarter

- (10:09) BGSU – Travis Greene 32 yard run (Tyler Tate kick) (Drive: 5 plays, 78 yards, 1:38; Bowling Green 21–10)
- (4:34) BGSU – Donovan Wilson 1 yard run (Tyler Tate kick) (Drive: 9 plays, 67 yards, 3:42; Bowling Green 28–10)
- (2:57) UMASS – Tajae Sharpe 23 yard pass from Blake Frohnapfel (Logan Laurent kick) (Drive: 7 plays, 81 yards, 1:32; Bowling Green 28–17)

Third quarter

- (10:40) BGSU – Fred Coppet 10 yard run (Tyler Tate kick) (Drive: 8 plays, 45 yards, 2:49; Bowling Green 35–17)
- (9:33) BGSU – Ryan Burbrink 40 yard pass from Matt Johnson (Tyler Tate kick) (Drive: 3 plays, 30 yards, :59; Bowling Green 42–17)
- (9:18) UMASS – James Oliphant 97 yard kickoff return (Logan Laurent kick) (Bowling Green 42–24)
- (5:49) BGSU – Travis Greene 12 yard pass from Matt Johnson (Tyler Tate kick) (Drive: 8 plays, 75 yards, 3:29; Bowling Green 49–24)
- (3:57) UMASS – Marken Michel 21 yard pass from Blake Frohnapfel (Logan Laurent kick) (Drive: 6 plays, 75 yards, 1:52; Bowling Green 49–31)
- (0:00) BGSU – Tyler Tate 37 yard field goal (Drive: 10 plays, 46 yards, 3:57; Bowling Green 52–31)

Fourth quarter

- (12:02) BGSU – Roger Lewis 68 yard pass from Matt Johnson (quarterback) (Tyler Tate kick) (Drive: 3 plays, 78 yards, 1:39; Bowling Green 59–31)
- (5:51) BGSU – Tyler Tate 27 yard field goal (Drive: 9 plays, 60 yards, 5:14; Bowling Green 62–31)
- (2:15) UMASS – Dan Jonah 25 yard pass from Ross Comis (Drive: 3 plays, 70 yards, :39; Bowling Green 62–31)

Statistics	UMass	Bowling Green
First downs	30	37
Plays–yards	516	725
Rushes–yards	15-30-0	46–206-3
Passing yards	486	519
Passing: comp–att–int	37–61–1	37–45–1
Turnovers		
Time of possession	22:43	37:17

Team	Category	Player	Statistics
UMass	Passing	Blake Frohnapfel	34/56, 409 yards, 3 TDS, 1 INT
UMass	Rushing	Marquis Young	5 carries, 35 yards
UMass	Receiving	Tajae Sharpe	13 receptions, 156 yards, 1 TD
Bowling Green	Passing	Matt Johnson	33/39, 450 yards, 5 TDS, 1 INT
Bowling Green	Rushing	Travis Greene	15 carries, 122 yards, 1 TD
Bowling Green	Receiving	Roger Lewis	8 receptions, 242 yards, 1 TD

=== Kent State ===
	1	2	3	4	Total
Golden Flashes	0	10	3	2	15
Minutemen	0	10	0	0	10

=== Toledo ===
	1	2	3	4	Total
#19 Rockets	3	7	21	20	51
Minutemen	14	14	0	7	35

=== Ball State ===
	1	2	3	4	Total
Minutemen	0	3	7	0	10
Cardinals	3	7	10	0	20

=== Akron ===
	1	2	3	4	Total
Zips	7	0	7	3	17
Minutemen	7	6	0	0	13

=== Eastern Michigan ===
	1	2	3	4	Total
Minutemen	7	7	7	7	28
Eagles	3	7	0	7	17

=== Miami (OH) ===
	1	2	3	4	Total
RedHawks	0	3	7	10	20
Minutemen	3	3	7	0	13

=== Buffalo ===
	1	2	3	4	Total
Minutemen	14	14	0	3	31
Bulls	10	7	3	6	26
