= Brandon London =

American gridiron football player (born 1984)

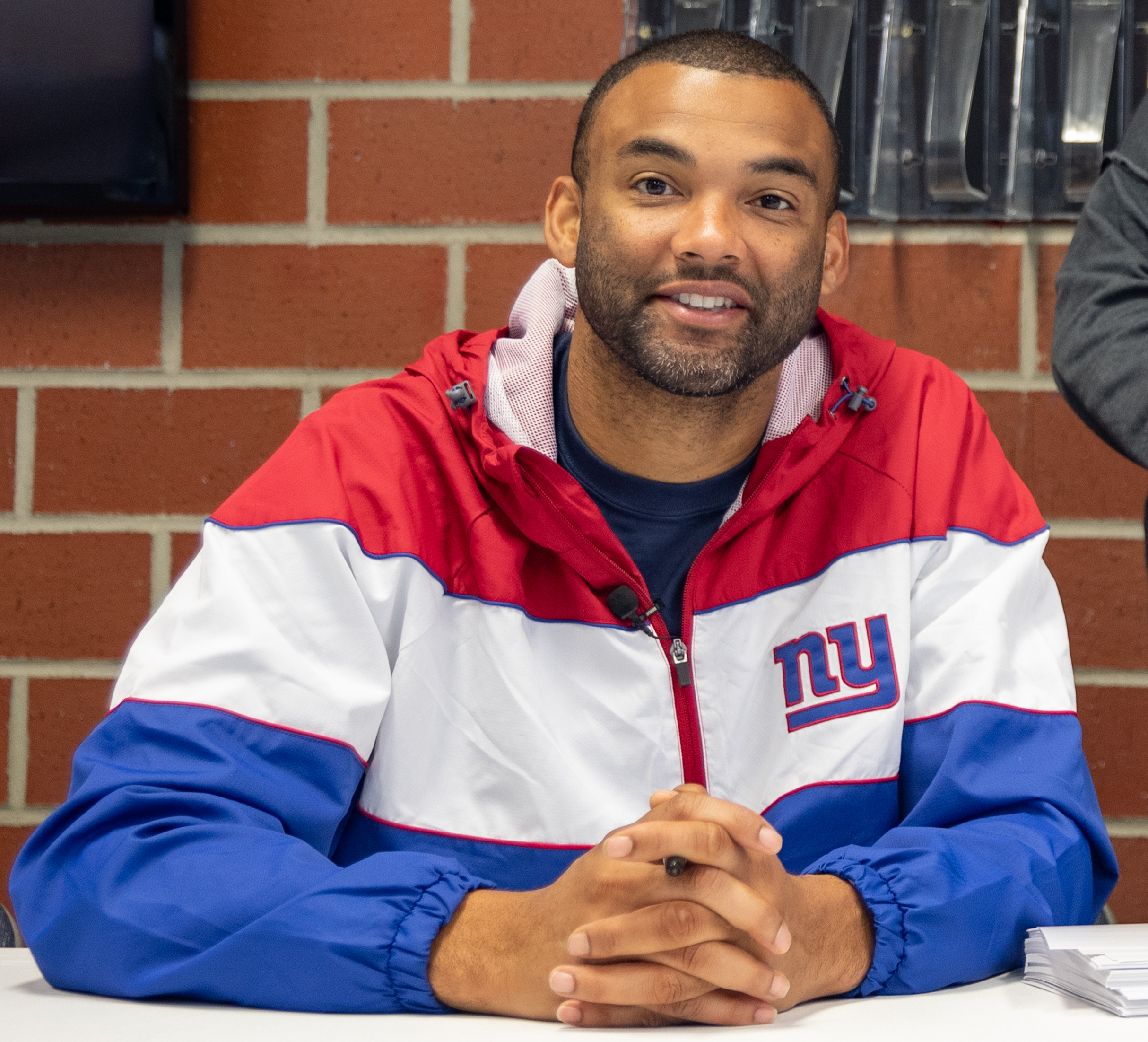
- London in 2024

No. 17, 14
- Position: Wide receiver

Personal information
- Born: October 16, 1984 (age 42); Richmond, Virginia, U.S.
- Listed height: 6 ft 4 in (1.93 m)
- Listed weight: 210 lb (95 kg)

Career information
- High school: Albemarle (VA); Framingham (MA); Fork Union Military Academy (VA)
- College: Massachusetts
- NFL draft: 2007: undrafted

Career history
- New York Giants (2007–2008)*; Miami Dolphins (2008); Pittsburgh Steelers (2010)*; Montreal Alouettes (2010–2014)
- * Offseason or practice squad member only

Awards and highlights
- Super Bowl champion (XLII); First-team All-A-10 (2006); Third-team All-A-10 (2005)

Career NFL statistics
- Receptions: 3
- Receiving yards: 30
- Stats at Pro Football Reference

Career CFL statistics
- Receptions: 138
- Receiving yards: 2,192
- Receiving touchdowns: 8
- Stats at CFL.ca (archived)

Brandon Jaime London (born October 16, 1984) is an American sports talk show host and former professional football wide receiver. He played college football at Massachusetts. He was signed by the New York Giants as an undrafted free agent in 2007.

London also played for the Miami Dolphins and Pittsburgh Steelers. He earned a Super Bowl ring as a member of the Giants' practice squad in Super Bowl XLII. He is the son of college football coach Mike London.

== College career ==
London led UMass in receptions (50) and receiving yards (781) during his senior year (2006). He finished second at UMass in career catches with 148, and became only the seventh UMass player with 100 or more career catches. He ranks third on the school's all-time list in receiving yards with 2,022. He is tied for fourth in career receiving TDs at UMass with 15, and is tied for fifth-best in single-season receiving touchdowns with 9.

=== Statistics ===
Career statistics (receiving)
Year	GP	GS	Rec	Yds	Avg	TD	Lg
2003	13	1	4	28	7.0	0	10
2004	11	6	34	439	12.9	3	35
2005	11	11	60	774	12.9	3	51
2006	14	14	50	781	15.6	9	41
Total	49	32	148	2022	13.7	15	51

== Professional football career ==
=== New York Giants ===
London was originally signed in 2007 to the New York Giants practice squad, then signed to the active roster on February 2, 2008. He was released on August 30, 2008, during final cuts.

=== Miami Dolphins ===
A day after being waived by the Giants, London was claimed by the Miami Dolphins. The team waived receiver Anthony Armstrong to make room for London.

In the only year in which London saw action in NFL games which counted, London played in 14 regular season games, as well as in the Dolphins' playoff game against the Baltimore Ravens. Targeted six times during the regular season, he caught three passes for a total of 30 yards, getting a first down on two of the three. He also returned two kicks, and additionally was credited with making six tackles. In the Dolphins' 27-9 playoff loss to the Ravens, London was targeted five times, making four receptions.

=== Pittsburgh Steelers ===
London signed a future contract with the Pittsburgh Steelers on February 9, 2010. He was cut by the team on September 3, 2010.

=== Montreal Alouettes ===
London signed with the Montreal Alouettes of the Canadian Football League (CFL) near the close of the 2010 CFL season. He did not play in any CFL games that season. In the 2011 season London played in all 18 games and scored his first CFL touchdown on September 11, 2011. Despite only playing in 12 games in the 2012 season he added more yardage and touchdowns than in his first season in the league. On March 18, 2013, the Alouettes signed London to a 3-year contract extension.

Over the course of his four years with the Alouettes, London caught 138 passes for 2,192 yards and 8 touchdowns.

On June 4, 2015, London announced his retirement from the CFL. Alouettes' general manager Jim Popp was effusive in his praise: “Today, the Montreal Alouettes celebrate the playing career of Brandon London. He has been an outstanding contributor on and off the field, a tremendous teammate, and a real pleasure to work with on a day-to-day basis. We wish Brandon continued success in his business ventures and in life. Thank you Brandon London and thank you for being an outstanding Montreal Alouette.”

== Other endeavors ==
London has been a model. After his playing career ended, he became a media personality.

== Personal life ==
His father, Mike London, is the head coach at the College of William & Mary for their football team, the Tribe. He previously served as the head coach for the Richmond Spiders for two seasons, including leading the team to a national championship his first season as head coach in 2008. He served as the defensive line coach for the Houston Texans in 2005.
