= Khari Samuel =

American football player (born 1976)

No. 91, 59
- Position: Linebacker

Personal information
- Born: October 14, 1976 (age 50); New York, New York, U.S.
- Listed height: 6 ft 3 in (1.91 m)
- Listed weight: 240 lb (109 kg)

Career information
- High school: Framingham (Framingham, Massachusetts)
- College: UMass
- NFL draft: 1999: 5th round, 144th overall pick

Career history
- Chicago Bears (1999–2001); Detroit Lions (2001); Houston Texans (2002)*
- * Offseason or practice squad member only

Awards and highlights
- First-team All-American (1998); First-team All-A-10 (1998); Second-team All-A-10 (1997); Third-team All-Yankee Conference (1996)
- Stats at Pro Football Reference

Khari Iman Mitchell Samuel (born October 14, 1976) is an American former professional football player who was a linebacker for with the Chicago Bears and Detroit Lions in the National Football League (NFL). He played college football for the UMass Minutemen.

== College career ==
Samuel played high school football at Framingham High School in Framingham, Massachusetts, and signed on to play at the University of Massachusetts Amherst. While at UMass he was a first-team All-American and first-team All-Atlantic 10 Conference selection who helped lead the Minutemen to their first ever national championship in 1998. Samuel finished his career as UMass’ all-time leader in solo tackles with 328, while ranking second in total tackles (495), fourth in assisted tackles (167) and seventh in sacks (19). As a senior in 1998, he recorded the second-highest single season total in school history for solo tackles (113), while ranking third on the list for total tackles (160).

== Professional career ==
=== Chicago Bears ===
Samuel was a fifth round selection (144th overall) by the Chicago Bears in the 1999 NFL draft. In his rookie season with Chicago, Samuel would appear in 13 games, making one start at linebacker and also playing on special teams. He recorded nine solo tackles and six assists while recovering one fumble.

In 2000 Samuel would appear in all 16 games for the Bears, primarily on special teams.

Samuel would start 2001 with Chicago but was cut after just one game.

=== Detroit Lions ===
Samuel would quickly be signed by the Detroit Lions and played in nine games, again playing on special teams. At the end of the season, he was cut from the Lions active roster.

=== Houston Texans ===
In 2002 Samuel signed a contract with the Houston Texans to attempt to make the team in training camp. Samuel would be cut by the Texans on August 31, 2002.
