= Todd Bankhead =

American gridiron football player (born 1977)

No. 5, 10
- Position: Quarterback

Personal information
- Born: June 6, 1977 (age 49); San Diego, California, U.S.
- Listed height: 6 ft 3 in (1.91 m)
- Listed weight: 210 lb (95 kg)

Career information
- High school: Orange Glen (Escondido, California)
- College: Palomar (1996–1997); UMass (1998–1999)
- NFL draft: 2000: undrafted

Career history
- Hamilton Tiger-Cats (2000); New Jersey Gladiators (2001); Georgia Force (2003)

Awards and highlights
- NCAA Division I-AA national champion (1998); 2× Second-team All-Atlantic 10 (1998–1999)

Career AFL statistics
- Comp. / Att.: 53 / 105
- Passing yards: 613
- TD–INT: 8–1
- Passer rating: 83.55
- Stats at ArenaFan.com

Todd Andrew Bankhead (born June 6, 1977) is an American former professional football quarterback who played in the Canadian Football League (CFL) and Arena Football League (AFL). He played college football at Palomar College and the University of Massachusetts Amherst. Professionally, he was a member of the Hamilton Tiger-Cats of the CFL, and the New Jersey Gladiators and Georgia Force of the AFL.

== Early life ==
Bankhead played high school football at Orange Glen High School in Escondido, California. He recorded 2,400 passing yards during his high school career and was team captain his senior year. He also played basketball for the Patriots and was a member of National Honor Society.

== College career ==
Bankhead played his first two seasons of college football at Palomar College from 1996 to 1997. He completed 73 of 153 passes for 1,010 yards with six touchdowns as a freshman, and 47 of 84 passes for 703 yards with three touchdowns as a sophomore.

Bankhead played his final two seasons of college football for the UMass Minutemen of University of Massachusetts Amherst from 1998 to 1999. He recorded career totals of 7,018 yards passing, 561 completions, 51 touchdown passes, 931 attempts and 6,821 yards of total offense for the Minutemen. He set single-season records in his junior season with 3,919 yards passing, 303 completions, 34 touchdown passes, an average of 261.3 yards passing per game, 3,756 yards of total offense and 525 attempts. Bankhead helped the Minutemen to their victory in the 1998 NCAA Division I-AA Football Championship Game. He established a school record with a 63.5 percent completion ratio when he had 258 completions in 406 attempts for 3,099 yards and 17 touchdowns during his senior year. He received second-team All-Atlantic 10 Conference honors as a junior and senior.

== Professional career ==
Bankhead signed with the Hamilton Tiger-Cats of the Canadian Football League (CFL) on June 15, 2000, after Montressa Kirby failed his physical. Bankhead had been working as an office furniture deliveryman when the Tiger-Cats called him. He dressed in 16 games, starting one, for Hamilton during the 2000 CFL season, completing 30 of 59 passes (50.8%) for 341 yards, two touchdowns, and four interceptions. He was released in December 2000.

Bankhead played with the New Jersey Gladiators during the 2001 Arena Football League season. He was signed by the AFL's Georgia Force on December 28, 2002.
