= Mark Whipple =

American football player and coach (born 1957)

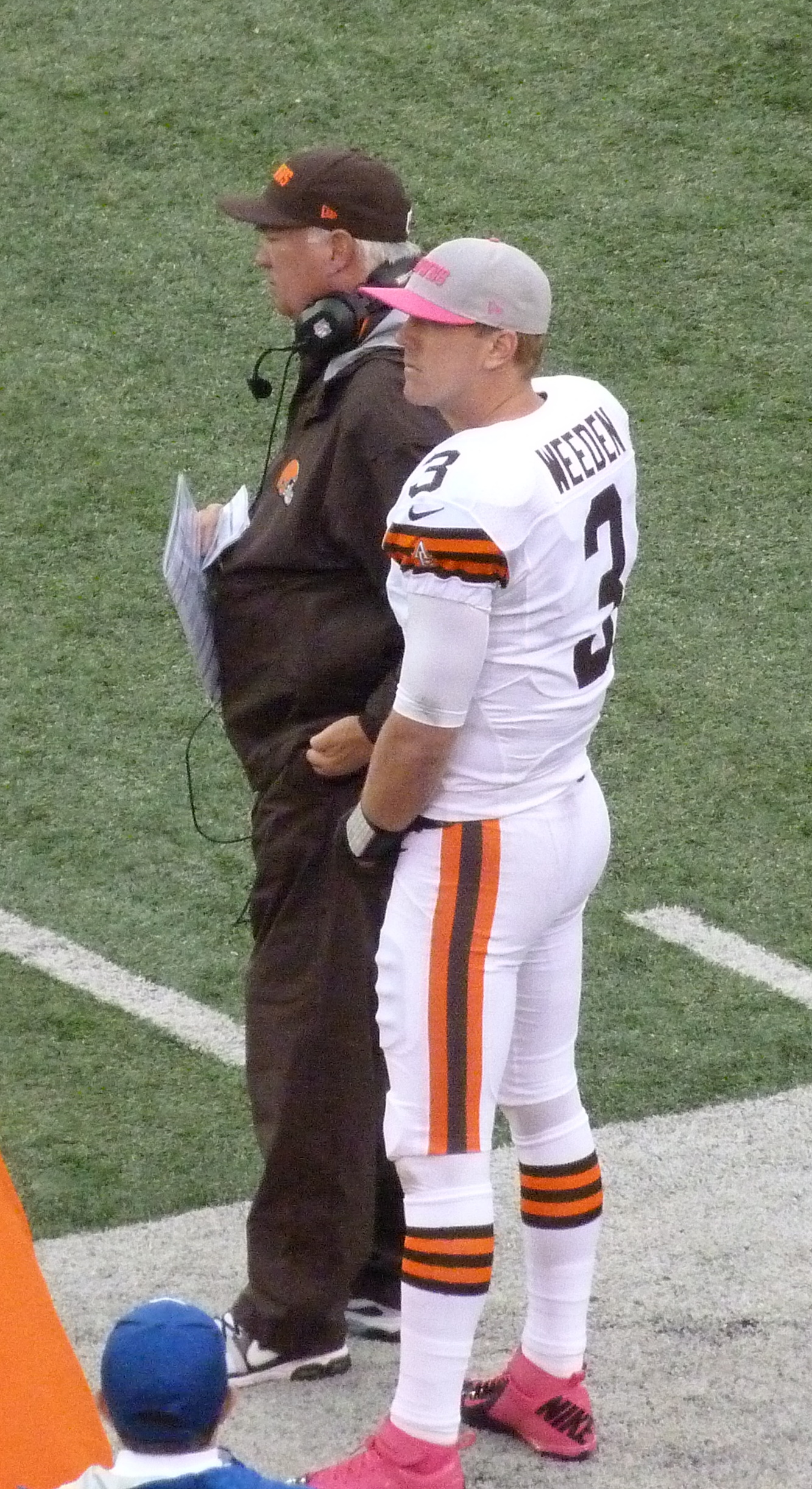
- Whipple (left) with Brandon Weeden, 2012

Biographical details
- Born: April 1, 1957 (age 69); Tarrytown, New York, U.S.

Playing career
- 1976–1979: Brown
- Position: Quarterback

Coaching career (HC unless noted)
- 1980: St. Lawrence (assistant)
- 1981–1982: Union (NY) (OC)
- 1983: Brown (WR)
- 1984: Arizona Wranglers (OQC/QB)
- 1986–1987: New Hampshire (OC)
- 1988–1993: New Haven
- 1994–1997: Brown
- 1998–2003: UMass
- 2004–2006: Pittsburgh Steelers (QB)
- 2008: Philadelphia Eagles (assistant)
- 2009–2010: Miami (FL) (AHC/OC/QB)
- 2011–2012: Cleveland Browns (QB)
- 2014–2018: UMass
- 2019–2021: Pittsburgh (OC/QB)
- 2022: Nebraska (OC/QB)

Head coaching record
- Overall: 137–103
- Tournaments: 3–2 (NCAA D-II playoffs); 5–2 (NCAA D-I-AA playoffs)

Accomplishments and honors

Championships
- 1 NCAA Division I-AA (1998); 3 A-10 (1998–1999, 2003)

Awards
- AFCA Division I-AA Coach of the Year (1998); Atlantic 10 Coach of the Year (2003)

Mark John Whipple (born April 1, 1957) is an American football coach. Whipple was the head football coach at University of New Haven from 1988 to 1993, Brown University from 1994 to 1997, and stints as the University of Massachusetts Amherst (UMass), from 1998 to 2003 and 2014 to 2018. His 1998 UMass team won the NCAA Division I-AA Football Championship. He was the quarterbacks coach for the Cleveland Browns of the National Football League (NFL) in 2011 and 2012. Before joining the Browns in January 2011, Whipple worked for two seasons as the offensive coordinator at the University of Miami. He previously coached in the NFL, working as a quarterback coach with the Pittsburgh Steelers from 2004 to 2006 and as an offensive assistant coach with the Philadelphia Eagles in 2007 and 2008. On January 14, 2014, Whipple returned to UMass as head coach.

== Early life and playing career ==
Whipple was born in Tarrytown, New York before moving to Phoenix, Arizona at the age of nine. He is a graduate of Camelback High School, where he was an All-State performer in both football and baseball. Whipple was named the Arizona Scholar-Athlete of the Year in 1975.

Whipple went on to play football at Brown University, where he was a 1979 graduate with a bachelor's degree in political science. Whipple was the starting quarterback for the Bears in 1977 and 1978, leading Brown to a 13–5 record and a pair of second-place Ivy League finishes. He was a member of the Bears' 1976 Ivy League championship team, the first Ivy football championship in school history. During his three-year varsity career, he completed 175 of 340 passes for 2,365 yards and 13 touchdowns, while running for 518 yards and 10 touchdowns. A two-time honorable mention All-Ivy pick in football, Whipple also earned four varsity letters on the baseball diamond as Brown's starting shortstop. He was inducted into the Brown Athletic Hall of Fame in 1996.

== Coaching career ==
Whipple began his coaching career as an assistant coach at St. Lawrence University in 1980, before serving as the offensive coordinator at Union College for next two seasons. In 1984, Whipple was hired as an assistant coach at his alma mater (Brown) where he worked with the wide receivers. The following season, Whipple spent as a member of the coaching staff for the United States Football League's Arizona Wranglers under George Allen, assisting with the quarterbacks.

Whipple served as the offensive coordinator at the University of New Hampshire for two years before receiving his first head coaching opportunity, as the new head coach of the University of New Haven Chargers in 1988. While at New Haven, his 1992 squad finished 12–1 and ranked No. 5 nationally. The team led all NCAA divisions in scoring offense (50.5 points per game) and total offense (587.7 yards per game). His 1993 New Haven team was named Sports Illustrated's "Best Offense in College Football" while averaging 52.5 points and 557.6 yards of total offense per game. His 1993 squad ranked as high as No. 2 nationally.

In 1994, he was hired by his alma mater to serve as head football coach at Brown University, where he spent the next four seasons. While at Brown, his 1997 squad set Ivy League and school records for total offense (474.3 yards per game) which included a single-game record of 629 yards against Yale. His 1995 team set several single-season records including most points (282), total offense (4,165 yards), passing offense (2,502 yards) and first downs (227).

In his first stint as coach of UMass from 1998 to 2003, he won the NCAA Division I-AA national title in his first season at the school. His UMass teams rewrote the record books, setting more than 40 team records. In 1998 his national championship team posted school records in points scored (524), touchdowns (73), total yards (7,074), passing yards (4,050), completions (306), and first downs (354).

Whipple left college football for a position as an assistant coach with the Pittsburgh Steelers of the NFL in 2004 where he was instrumental in the development of Ben Roethlisberger, who in his rookie season became the first NFL quarterback to finish a season undefeated with a 13–0 record in games he started. Roethlisberger later became the youngest starting quarterback to win a Super Bowl. On January 25, 2007, Whipple was let go by new Steelers head coach Mike Tomlin and replaced with Ken Anderson. The next day, Whipple was hired by the Philadelphia Eagles.

On January 7, 2009, Whipple was named the offensive coordinator at Miami. Whipple was fired along with head coach Randy Shannon, following the end of the season loss to South Florida on November 27, 2010. After coach Tom O'Brien left Boston College to coach North Carolina State, it was reported that Mark Whipple was the leading candidate to replace him. That job eventually went to Jeff Jagodzinski. He was reported to be the leading candidate for the Connecticut Huskies head football coach, an opening created when Randy Edsall left to replace Ralph Friedgen as the head coach at the University of Maryland, College Park following the 2010 season. However, Connecticut hired Paul Pasqualoni on January 13, 2011.

Whipple signed a contract with the Cleveland Browns on January 30, 2011, to be their quarterback coach. He was fired along with the rest of the Browns coach staff at the end of the 2012 season. He returned to UMass for his second stint going 16-44 from 2014 to 2018.

== Head coaching record ==
Year	Team	Overall	Conference	Standing	Bowl/playoffs	Coaches^{#}	AP^{°}
New Haven Chargers (NCAA Division II independent) (1988–1993)
1988	New Haven	7–3					
1989	New Haven	8–2				12	
1990	New Haven	7–3				19	
1991	New Haven	3–7					
1992	New Haven	12–1			L NCAA Division II Semifinal	5	
1993	New Haven	11–1			L NCAA Division II Quarterfinal	2	
New Haven:		48–17					
Brown Bears (Ivy League) (1994–1997)
1994	Brown	7–3	4–3	T–2nd			
1995	Brown	5–5	2–5	T–6th			
1996	Brown	5–5	4–3	T–3rd			
1997	Brown	7–3	4–3	T–3rd			
Brown:		24–16	14–14				
UMass Minutemen (Atlantic 10 Conference) (1998–2003)
1998	UMass	12–3	6–2	T–1st (New England)	W NCAA Division I-AA Championship		1
1999	UMass	9–4	7–1	T–1st	L NCAA Division I-AA Quarterfinal		7
2000	UMass	7–4	5–3	3rd			
2001	UMass	3–8	3–6	T–8th			
2002	UMass	8–4	6–3	T–3rd			
2003	UMass	10–3	8–1	T–1st	L NCAA Division I-AA First Round		11
UMass Minutemen (Mid-American Conference) (2014–2015)
2014	UMass	3–9	3–5	T–4th (East)			
2015	UMass	3–9	2–6	T–5th (East)			
UMass Minutemen (NCAA Division I FBS independent) (2016–2018)
2016	UMass	2–10					
2017	UMass	4–8					
2018	UMass	4–8					
UMass:		65–70	40–27				
Total:		137–103					
National championship Conference title Conference division title or championship game berth
