= 2017 UMass Minutemen football team =

American college football season

2017 UMass Minutemen football
- Conference: Independent
- Record: 4–8
- Head coach: Mark Whipple (10th season)
- Offensive scheme: Pro-style
- Defensive coordinator: Ed Pinkham (1st season)
- Base defense: 4–3
- Home stadium: Warren McGuirk Alumni Stadium

2017 NCAA Division I FBS independents football records
	Conf.			Overall
Team	W		L	W		L
Army		–		10	–	3
No. 11 Notre Dame		–		10	–	3
UMass		–		4	–	8
BYU		–		4	–	9
Rankings from AP Poll

The 2017 UMass Minutemen football team represented the University of Massachusetts Amherst in the 2017 NCAA Division I FBS football season. This was the fourth year of head coach Mark Whipple's second stint at UMass and 10th year overall. The Minutemen divided their home schedule between two stadiums. Five home games were played at the UMass campus at Warren McGuirk Alumni Stadium with their final home game at Fenway Park. This was UMass's second year as an independent. This season's 4-8 finish remains tied with 2018 for the most wins the Minutemen have recorded in a season since their move to the FBS.

== Schedule ==
Date	Time	Opponent	Site	TV	Result	Attendance
August 26	6:00 p.m.	Hawaii	Warren McGuirk Alumni Stadium; Hadley, MA	ELVN☆	L 35–38	12,145
September 2	7:00 p.m.	at Coastal Carolina	Brooks Stadium; Conway, SC	ESPN3	L 28–38	13,274
September 9	3:30 p.m.	Old Dominion	Warren McGuirk Alumni Stadium; Hadley, MA	ELVN	L 7–17	9,028
September 15	7:00 p.m.	at Temple	Lincoln Financial Field; Philadelphia, PA	ESPNU	L 21–29	22,911
September 23	12:00 p.m.	at Tennessee	Neyland Stadium; Knoxville, TN	SECN	L 13–17	95,324
September 30	3:30 p.m.	Ohio	Warren McGuirk Alumni Stadium; Hadley, MA	ELVN	L 50–58	7,696
October 21	3:30 p.m.	Georgia Southern^{†}	Warren McGuirk Alumni Stadium; Hadley, MA	ELVN	W 55–20	10,690
October 28	3:30 p.m.	Appalachian State	Warren McGuirk Alumni Stadium; Hadley, MA	ELVN	W 30–27 ^{2OT}	11,889
November 4	12:00 p.m.	at No. 21 Mississippi State	Davis Wade Stadium; Starkville, MS	SECN	L 23–34	57,354
November 11	4:00 p.m.	Maine	Fenway Park; Boston, MA	ELVN	W 44–31	12,794
November 18	3:00 p.m.	at BYU	LaVell Edwards Stadium; Provo, UT	BYUtv/ESPN3	W 16–10	51,355
December 2	12:00 p.m.	at FIU	Riccardo Silva Stadium; Miami, FL	CUSA.tv	L 45–63	14,004
^{†}Homecoming; Rankings from AP Poll released prior to the game; All times are in Eastern time

^{^[a]}The game between UMass and South Florida was postponed due to Hurricane Irma. A game with FIU was scheduled after FIU's game with Indiana was cancelled.
Schedule source:

☆All Eleven Sports broadcasts will be simulcast on NESN or NESN+.

== Game summaries ==
=== Hawaii ===
Hawai'i at UMass

Team	1	2	3	4	Total
• Rainbow Warriors	7	7	7	17	38
Minutemen	7	7	14	7	35

- Date: August 26
- Location: Warren McGuirk Alumni Stadium
  Hadley, MA
- Game start: 6:00 p.m. EDT
- Elapsed time: 3:38
- Game attendance: 12,145
- Game weather: Temperature: 72 °F (22 °C), Winds: NNW 2 mph (3.2 km/h), Weather: Clear
- Referee: Adam Savoie
- TV announcers (ELVN): Eric Frede, Andy Gresh, Seth Cantor

Scoring summary
1	8:51	Hawai'i	Dru Brown 27 yard run (Alex Trifonovitch kick), Drive: 7 plays, 55 yards, 2:53	0–7
1	6:00	UMass	Andy Isabella 6 yard run (Michael Schreiner kick), Drive: 9 plays, 76 yards, 2:51	7–7
2	1:57	Hawai'i	John Ursua 85 yard pass from Dru Brown (Alex Trifonovitch kick), Drive: 2 plays, 83 yards, 0:42	7–14
2	0:02	UMass	Andy Isabella 2 yard pass from Andrew Ford (Michael Schreiner kick), Drive: 8 plays, 63 yards, 1:55	14–14
3	11:12	UMass	Marquis Young 1 yard run (Michael Schreiner kick), Drive: 10 plays, 79 yards, 3:48	21–14
3	4:35	UMass	Malik Lee 3 yard pass from Andrew Ford (Michael Schreiner kick), Drive: 12 plays, 65 yards, 4:38	28–14
3	2:09	Hawai'i	Ryan Tuiasoa 2 yard run (Alex Trifonovitch kick), Drive: 8 plays, 72 yards, 2:26	28–21
4	13:34	Hawai'i	Marcus Armstrong-Brown 8 yard pass from Dru Brown (Alex Trifonovitch kick), Drive: 2 plays, 15 yards, 0:47	28–28
4	11:41	UMass	Marquis Young 21 yard run (Michael Schreiner kick), Drive: 5 plays, 46 yards, 1:53	35–28
4	5:23	Hawai'i	Ryan Meskell 29 yard field goal, Drive: 12 plays, 47 yards, 6:18	35–31
4	0:48	Hawai'i	Metuisela 'Unga 7 yard pass from Dru Brown (Alex Trifonovitch kick), Drive: 8 plays, 73 yards, 2:04	35–38

=== Coastal Carolina ===
UMass at Coastal Carolina

Team	1	2	3	4	Total
Minutemen	7	7	7	7	28
• Chanticleers	14	7	10	7	38

- Date: September 2
- Location: Brooks Stadium
  Conway, SC
- Game start: 7:00 p.m. EDT
- Elapsed time: 3:16
- Game attendance: 13,274
- Game weather: Temperature: 74 °F (23 °C), Weather: Overcast
- Referee: Kevin Stine
- TV announcers (ESPN3): Brock Bowling, Stan Lewter

Scoring summary
1	8:21	Coastal	Dalton Demos 1 yard run (Evan Rabon kick), Drive: 4 plays, 17 yards, 1:52	0–7
1	6:48	UMass	Marquis Young 4 yard run (Michael Schreiner kick), Drive: 4 plays, 72 yards, 1:26	7–7
1	00:47	Coastal	Dalton Demos 22 yard run (Evan Rabon kick), Drive: 5 plays, 38 yards, 2:32	7–14
2	10:37	UMass	Andy Isabella 21 pass from Andrew Ford (Michael Schreiner kick), Drive: 12 plays, 63 yards, 5:00	14–14
2	00:51	Coastal	Osharmar Abercrombie 4 yard run (Evan Rabon kick), Drive: 3 plays, 36 yards, 1:16	14–21
3	12:51	UMass	Andrew Ford 9 yard run (Michael Schreiner kick), Drive: 9 plays, 79 yards, 2:03	21–21
3	9:24	Coastal	Evan Rabon 46 yard field goal, Drive: 7 plays, 53 yards, 3:21	21–24
3	4:48	Coastal	Chris Jones 13 yard pass from Tyler Keane Drive: 4 plays, 58 yards, 1:31	21–31
4	3:45	Coastal	Osharmar Abercrombie 7 yard run Drive: 8 plays, 89 yards, 4:04	21–38
4	1:10	UMass	Marquis Young 1 yard run Drive: 8 plays, 84 yards, 2:18	28–38

=== Old Dominion ===
Old Dominion at UMass

Team	1	2	3	4	Total
• Monarchs	3	7	0	7	17
Minutemen	0	0	7	0	7

- Date: September 9
- Location: Warren McGuirk Alumni Stadium
  Hadley, MA
- Game start: 3:30 p.m. EDT
- Elapsed time: 2:59
- Game attendance: 9,028
- Game weather: Temperature: 67 °F (19 °C), Wind: N 8 mph (13 km/h), Weather: Partly Cloudy
- Referee: Jon Noli
- TV announcers (ELVN): Eric Frede, Andy Gresh, Seth Cantor

Scoring summary
1	10:32	Old Dominion	Nick Rice 28 yard field goal, Drive: 10 plays, 64 yards, 4:28	0–3
2	1:00	Old Dominion	Jonathan Duhart 2 yard pass from Blake Laurssa (Nick Rice kick), Drive: 9 plays, 86 yards, 3:02	0–10
3	14:26	UMass	Andy Isabella 60 yard pass from Andrew Ford (Michael Schreiner kick), Drive: 2 plays, 71 yards, 0:34	7–10
4	6:59	Old Dominion	Jordan Hoy 7 yard run (Nick Rice kick), Drive: 9 plays, 34 yards, 4:19	7–17

=== Temple ===
UMass at Temple

Team	1	2	3	4	Total
Minutemen	0	7	7	7	21
• Owls	3	13	6	7	29

- Date: September 15
- Location: Lincoln Financial Field
  Philadelphia, PA
- Game start: 7:00 p.m. EDT
- Elapsed time: 3:29
- Game attendance: 22,911
- Game weather: Temperature: 80 °F (27 °C), Wind: SW 7 mph (11 km/h), Weather: Partly Cloudy
- Referee: Charles Lewis
- TV announcers (ESPNU): Mike Corey, Rene Ingoglia

Scoring summary
1	12:47	Temple	Austin Jones 24 yard field goal, Drive: 6 plays, 65 yards, 2:17	0–3
2	2:29	UMass	Nick Orekoya 10 yard pass from Andrew Ford (Michael Schreiner kick), Drive: 5 plays, 64 yards, 2:20	7–3
2	1:04	Temple	Adonis Jennings 30 yard pass from Logan Marchi (Austin Jones kick), Drive: 8 plays, 73 yards, 1:25	7–10
2	0:10	Temple	Keith Kirkwood 11 yard pass from Logan Marchi (Austin Jones kick missed), Drive: 3 plays, 18 yards, 0:36	7–16
3	10:18	Temple	Aaron Boumerhi 52 yard field goal, Drive: 9 plays, 53 yards, 3:30	7–19
3	5:56	UMass	Jessie Britt 20 yard pass from Andrew Ford (Michael Schreiner kick), Drive: 9 plays, 66 yards, 4:22	14–19
3	1:52	Temple	Austin Jones 37 yard field goal, Drive: 10 plays, 44 yards, 4:03	14–22
4	3:48	Temple	Isaiah Wright 13 yard pass from Logan Marchi (Austin Jones kick), Drive: 10 plays, 72 yards, 4:51	14–29
4	1:41	UMass	Andrew Ford 3 yard run (Michael Schreiner kick), Drive: 8 plays, 67 yards, 2:07	21–29

=== Tennessee ===
UMass at Tennessee

Team	1	2	3	4	Total
Minutemen	0	6	7	0	13
• Volunteers	0	14	3	0	17

- Date: September 23
- Location: Neyland Stadium
  Knoxville, TN
- Game start: 12:00 p.m. EDT
- Elapsed time: 3:21
- Game attendance: 95,324
- Game weather: Temperature: 80 °F (27 °C), Wind: 2 mph (3.2 km/h), Weather: Partly Cloudy
- Referee: Matt Loeffler
- TV announcers (SECN): Taylor Zarzour, Andre Ware, Olivia Harlan

Scoring summary
2	4:33	Tennessee	John Kelly 12 yard run (Aaron Medley Kick), Drive: 4 plays, 80 yards, 1:44	0–7
2	2:57	UMass	Ross Comis 5 yard run (Michael Schreiner kick failed), Drive: 5 plays, 75 yards, 1:36	6–7
2	0:25	Tennessee	Tyler Byrd 8 yard pass from Quinten Dormady (Aaron Medley kick), Drive: 9 plays, 75 yards, 2:32	6–14
3	7:32	Tennessee	Aaron Medley 40 yard field goal, Drive: 6 plays, 18 yards, 1:31	6–17
3	2:51	UMass	Sadiq Palmer 13 yard pass from Andrew Ford (Logan Laurent kick), Drive: 10 plays, 75 yards, 4:41	13–17

=== Ohio ===
Ohio at UMass

Team	1	2	3	4	Total
• Bobcats	7	20	14	17	58
Minutemen	10	17	2	21	50

- Date: September 30
- Location: Warren McGuirk Alumni Stadium
  Hadley, MA
- Game start: 3:30 p.m. EDT
- Elapsed time: 3:45
- Game attendance: 7,696
- Game weather: Temperature: 61 °F (16 °C), Wind: N 6 mph (9.7 km/h), Weather: Overcast
- Referee: Tracy Jones
- TV announcers (ELVN): Eric Frede, Andy Gresh, Seth Cantor

Scoring summary
1	12:30	UMass	Logan Laurent 24 yard field goal, Drive: 8 plays, 69 yards, 2:30	3–0
1	9:03	Ohio	Nathan Rourke 5 yard run (Louie Zervos kick), Drive: 7 plays, 76 yards, 3:27	3–7
1	4:05	UMass	Ross Comis 2 yard run (Logan Laurent kick), Drive: 13 plays, 75 yards, 4:58	10–7
2	11:35	UMass	Logan Laurent 35 yard field goal, Drive: 11 plays, 60 yards, 4:38	13–7
2	10:22	Ohio	Brendan Cope 16 yard pass from Nathan Rourke (Louie Zervos kick), Drive: 3 plays, 28 yards, 1:13	13–14
2	8:57	Ohio	Nathan Rourke 17 yard run (Louie Zervos kick), Drive: 2 plays, 18 yards, 0:40	13–21
2	7:24	Ohio	Louie Zervos 25 yard field goal, Drive: 4 plays, -1 yard, 0:51	13–24
2	7:09	UMass	Adam Breneman 6 yard pass from Andrew Ford (Logan Laurent kick), Drive: 1 play, 6 yards, 0:15	20–24
2	2:26	UMass	Brennon Dingle 30 yard pass from Andrew Ford (Logan Laurent kick), Drive: 7 plays, 71 yards, 2:47	27–24
2	0:38	Ohio	Louie Zervos 23 yard field goal, Drive: 12 plays, 45 yards, 1:48	27–27
3	12:41	Ohio	A. J. Ouellette 5 yard run (Louie Zervos kick), Drive: 6 plays, 75 yards, 2:19	27–34
3	6:38	Ohio	A.J. Ouellette 12 yard pass from Nathan Rourke (Louie Zervos kick), Drive: 10 plays, 79 yards, 4:24	27–41
3	3:14	UMass	Team Safety, Drive: 1 play, -20 yards, 0:06	29–41
4	13:41	Ohio	Dorian Brown 15 yard run (Louie Zervos kick), Drive: 2 plays, 75 yards, 0:40	29–48
4	10:41	UMass	Marquis Young 19 yard pass from Andrew Ford (two-point pass conv. failed), Drive: 8 plays, 75 yards, 3:00	35–48
4	6:10	Ohio	Louie Zervos 34 yard field goal, Drive: 8 plays, 45 yards, 4:31	35–51
4	3:23	UMass	Adam Breneman 7 yard pass from Andrew Ford (Andrew Ford pass to Andy Isabella for two-point conv.), Drive: 10 plays, 74 yards, 2:47	43–51
4	1:42	Ohio	Dorian Brown 42 yard run (Louie Zervos kick), Drive: 3 plays, 47 yards, 1:41	43–58
4	0:11	UMass	Brennon Dingle 16 yard pass from Andrew Ford (Logan Laurent kick), Drive: 7 plays, 69 yards, 1:31	50–58

=== Georgia Southern ===
Georgia Southern at UMass

Team	1	2	3	4	Total
Eagles	7	10	3	0	20
• Minutemen	28	20	0	7	55

- Date: October 21
- Location: Warren McGuirk Alumni Stadium
  Hadley, MA
- Game start: 3:30 p.m. EDT
- Elapsed time: 3:06
- Game attendance: 10,690
- Game weather: Temperature: 78 °F (26 °C), Weather: Sunny
- Referee: A. Calabrese
- TV announcers (ELVN): Eric Frede, Andy Gresh, Seth Cantor

Scoring summary
1	9:37	UMass	Adam Breneman 1 yard pass from Ross Comis (Logan Laurent kick), Drive: 11 plays, 97 yards, 5:05	7–0
1	7:24	UMass	Andy Isabella 68 yard pass from Ross Comis (Logan Laurent kick), Drive: 1 play, 68 yards, 0:17	14–0
1	7:10	UMass	Jessie Britt 26 yard pass from Ross Comis (Logan Laurent kick), Drive: 1 play, 26 yards, 0:08	21–0
1	4:02	Georgia Southern	Kado Brown 12 yard run (Tyler Bass kick), Drive: 7 plays, 58 yards, 3:08	21–7
1	1:47	UMass	Bilal Ally 19 yard run (Logan Laurent kick), Drive: 6 plays, 75 yards, 2:15	28–7
2	10:15	Georgia Southern	Tyler Bass 41 yard field goal, Drive: 13 plays, 56 yards, 5:10	28–10
2	8:33	UMass	Marquis Young 7 yard run (Logan Laurent kick), Drive: 5 plays, 75 yards, 1:42	35–10
2	6:12	UMass	Brennon Dingle 43 yard pass from Andrew Ford (Logan Laurent kick failed), Drive: 1 play, 43 yards, 0:09	41–10
2	2:53	Georgia Southern	Kado Brown 10 yard run (Tyler Bass kick), Drive: 7 plays, 45 yards, 3:19	41–17
2	0:29	UMass	Bilal Ally 2 yard run (Logan Laurent kick), Drive: 8 plays, 75 yards, 2:24	48–17
3	8:14	Georgia Southern	Tyler Bass 34 yard field goal, Drive: 8 plays, 11 yards, 2:27	48–20
4	11:46	UMass	Bilal Ally 57 yard run (Logan Laurent kick), Drive: 5 plays, 70 yards, 3:14	55–20

=== Appalachian State ===
Appalachian State at UMass

Team	1	2	3	4	OT	2OT	Total
Mountaineers	0	14	3	3	7	0	27
• Minutemen	10	7	0	3	7	3	30

- Date: October 28
- Location: Warren McGuirk Alumni Stadium
  Hadley, MA
- Game start: 3:30 p.m. EDT
- Elapsed time: 3:43
- Game attendance: 12,000
- Game weather: Temperature: 66 °F (19 °C), Wind: S 15 mph (24 km/h), Weather: Partly Cloudy
- Referee: Todd LaPlenta
- TV announcers (ELVN): Eric Frede, Andy Gresh, Seth Cantor

Scoring summary
1	9:21	UMass	Nick Orekoya 1 yard run (Logan Laurent kick), Drive: 3 plays, 40 yards, 0:53	7–0
1	6:10	UMass	Logan Laurent 47 yard field goal, Drive: 4 plays, 2 yards, 0:35	10–0
2	12:55	Appalachian State	Taylor Lamb 15 yard run (Chandler Staton kick), Drive: 3 plays, 29 yards, 1:14	10–7
2	4:09	UMass	Marquis Young 95 yard run (Logan Laurent kick), Drive: 1 play, 95 yards, 0:14	17–7
2	0:04	Appalachian State	Thomas Hennigan 1 yard pass from Taylor Lamb (Chandler Staton kick), Drive: 4 plays, 39 yards, 0:21	17–14
3	5:06	Appalachian State	Chandler Staton 40 yard field goal, Drive: 10 plays, 47 yards, 5:20	17–17
4	4:42	Appalachian State	Chandler Staton 30 yard field goal, Drive: 14 plays, 67 yards, 7:50	17–20
4	0:05	UMass	Logan Laurent 45 yard field goal, Drive: 12 plays, 53 yards, 1:45	20–20
OT	0:00	UMass	Marquis Young 10 yard run (Logan Laurent kick), Drive: 4 plays, 25 yards, 0:00	27–20
OT	0:00	Appalachian State	Ike Lewis 20 yard pass from Taylor Lamb (Chandler Staton kick), Drive: 2 plays, 25 yards, 0:00	27–27
2OT	0:00	UMass	Logan Laurent 36 yard field goal, Drive: 4 plays, 7 yards, 0:00	30–27

=== Mississippi State ===
UMass at Mississippi State

Team	1	2	3	4	Total
Minutemen	3	17	0	3	23
• Bulldogs	10	3	14	7	34

- Date: November 4
- Location: Davis Wade Stadium
  Starkville, MS
- Game start: 12:00 p.m. EDT
- Elapsed time: 3:18
- Game attendance: 57,374
- Game weather: Temperature: 70 °F (21 °C), Wind: SSW 4 mph (6.4 km/h), Weather: Overcast
- Referee: Hubert Owens
- TV announcers (SECN): Taylor Zarzour, Andre Ware and Olivia Harlan

Scoring summary
1	13:42	Mississippi State	J.T. Gray 58 yard interception return (Jace Christmann kick), Drive: 4 plays, 23 yards, 1:18	0–7
1	10:32	UMass	Logan Laurent 23 yard field goal, Drive: 6 plays, 70 yards, 3:10	3–7
1	5:18	Mississippi State	Jace Christmann 28 yard field goal, Drive: 13 plays, 54 yards, 5:14	3–10
2	13:06	UMass	Logan Laurent 48 yard field goal, Drive: 6 plays, 16 yards, 1:54	6–10
2	12:59	UMass	Isaiah Rodgers 29 yard interception return (Logan Laurent kick), Drive: 1 play, 0 yards, 0:07	13–10
2	8:49	Mississippi State	Jace Christmann 25 yard field goal, Drive: 11 plays, 68 yards, 4:10	13–13
2	7:15	UMass	Andy Isabella 69 yard pass from Ross Comis (Logan Laurent kick), Drive: 4 plays, 78 yards, 1:34	20–13
3	1215	Mississippi State	Nick Fitzgerald 8 yard run (Jace Christmann kick), Drive: 8 plays, 75 yards, 2:45	20–20
3	4:46	Mississippi State	Nick Fitzgerald 10 Yd Run (Jace Christmann kick), Drive: 12 plays, 79 yards, 5:36	20–27
4	8:18	UMass	Logan Laurent 26 yard field goal, Drive: 10 plays, 47 yards, 4:30	23–27
4	5:00	Mississippi State	Deddrick Thomas 83 yard punt return (Jace Christmann kick), Drive: 3 plays, 5 yards, 1:56	23–34

=== Maine ===
Maine at UMass

Team	1	2	3	4	Total
Black Bears	7	9	8	7	31
• Minutemen	21	3	13	7	44

- Date: November 11
- Location: Fenway Park
  Boston, MA
- Game start: 4:00 p.m. EST
- Elapsed time: 3:37
- Game attendance: 12,974
- Game weather: Temperature: 36 °F (2 °C), Wind: NW 7 mph (11 km/h), Weather: Clear and Sunny
- Referee: Todd LaPlenta
- TV announcers (ELVN): Eric Frede, Andy Gresh, Seth Cantor

Scoring summary
1	13:29	UMass	Jessie Britt 33 yard pass from Andrew Ford (Logan Laurent kick), Drive: 4 plays, 79 yards, 1:31	7–0
1	13:16	Maine	Earnest Edwards 95 yard kickoff return (Brandon Briggs kick), Drive: 0 plays, 0 yards, 0:00	7–7
1	11:32	UMass	Andy Isabella 69 yard pass from Andrew Ford (Logan Laurent kick), Drive: 5 plays, 66 yards, 1:44	14–7
1	1:02	UMass	Andy Isabella 12 yard pass from Andrew Ford (Logan Laurent kick), Drive: 6 plays, 59 yards, 2:08	21–7
2	10:20	UMass	Logan Laurent 41 yard field goal, Drive: 9 plays, 52 yards, 3:54	24–7
2	8:00	Maine	Chris Ferguson 9 yard run (Brandon Briggs kick), Drive: 5 plays, 57 yards, 2:20	24–14
2	3:28	Maine	Team Safety, Drive: 2 plays, -5 yards, 1:08	24–16
3	10:00	Maine	Josh Mack 1 yard run (Chris Ferguson pass to Drew Belcher for two-point conv.), Drive: 12 plays, 80 yards, 5:00	24–24
3	2:42	UMass	Andy Isabella 14 yard pass from Andrew Ford (Logan Laurent kick), Drive: 6 plays, 60 yards, 2:22	31–24
3	1:08	UMass	Lee Moses 70 yard interception return (Logan Laurent kick blocked), Drive: 4 plays, 36 yards, 1:34	37–24
4	6:46	Maine	Josh Mack 37 yard run (Brandon Briggs kick), Drive: 4 plays, 85 yards, 1:06	37–31
4	1:57	UMass	Marquis Young 33 yard run (Logan Laurent kick), Drive: 2 plays, 35 yards, 0:14	44–31

=== BYU ===
UMass at BYU

Team	1	2	3	4	Total
• Minutemen	0	3	13	0	16
Cougars	0	0	3	7	10

- Date: November 18
- Location: LaVell Edwards Stadium
  Provo, UT
- Game start: 3:00 p.m. EST
- Elapsed time: 3:06
- Game attendance: 51,355
- Game weather: Temperature: 40 °F (4 °C), Weather: Clear
- Referee: Michael Roche
- TV announcers (BYUtv/ESPN3): Dave McCann, Blaine Fowler, Lauren Francom McClain

Scoring summary
2	5:15	UMass	Logan Laurent 34 yard field goal, Drive: 16 plays, 74 yards, 6:44	3–0
3	13:21	UMass	Andy Isabella 40 yard pass from Andrew Ford (Logan Laurent kick), Drive: 5 plays, 74 yards, 1:33	10–0
3	7:15	UMass	Logan Laurent 28 yard field goal, Drive: 10 plays, 56 yards, 4:19	13–0
3	4:55	UMass	Logan Laurent 35 yard field goal, Drive: 4 plays, 7 yards, 1:01	16–0
3	1:35	BYU	Rhett Almond 40 yard field goal, Drive: 9 plays, 53 yards, 3:20	16–3
4	0:53	BYU	Matt Bushman 6 yard pass from Joe Critchlow (Rhett Almond kick), Drive: 9 plays, 87 yards, 1:28	16–10

=== FIU ===
UMass at FIU

Team	1	2	3	4	Total
Minutemen	14	7	10	14	45
• Panthers	14	21	7	21	63

- Date: December 2
- Location: Riccardo Silva Stadium
  Miami, FL
- Game start: 12:00 p.m. EDT
- Elapsed time: 3:21
- Game attendance: 14,004
- Game weather: Temperature: 80 °F (27 °C), Wind: 12 mph (19 km/h), Weather: Sunny
- Referee: Stephen LaManti
- TV announcers (CUSA.tv): A.J. Ricketts, Hurlie Brown

Scoring summary
1	11:02	FIU	Alex Gardner 12 yard run (José Borregales kick), Drive: 9 plays, 75 yards, 3:58	0–7
1	7:35	FIU	Shawndarrius Phillips 5 yard run (José Borregales kick), Drive: 3 plays, 80 yards, 1:26	0–14
1	6:40	UMass	Andy Isabella 24 yard pass from Andrew Ford (Logan Laurent kick), Drive: 3 plays, 74 yards, 0:55	7–14
1	2:13	UMass	Marquis Young 1 yard run (Logan Laurent kick), Drive: 3 plays, 30 yards, 0:00	14–14
2	13:03	FIU	Napoleon Maxwell 6 yard run (José Borregales kick), Drive: 8 plays, 75 yards, 4:10	14–21
2	9:59	UMass	Brennon Dingle 28 yard pass from Andrew Ford (Logan Laurent kick), Drive: 7 plays, 75 yards, 3:04	21–21
2	1:49	FIU	Alex Gardner 1 yard run (José Borregales kick), Drive: 10 plays, 77 yards, 4:02	21–28
2	0:37	FIU	Bryce Singleton 31 yard pass from Alex McGough (José Borregales kick), Drive: 3 plays, 37 yards, 0:18	21–35
3	12:16	UMass	Logan Laurent 36 yard field goal, Drive: 9 plays, 57 yards, 2:44	24–35
3	5:01	UMass	Adam Breneman 2 yard pass from Andrew Ford (Logan Laurent kick), Drive: 9 plays, 74 yards, 3:27	31–35
3	2:36	FIU	Alex McGough 60 yard run (José Borregales kick), Drive: 6 plays, 92 yards, 2:25	31–42
4	11:51	FIU	Bryce Singleton 19 yard pass from Alex McGough (José Borregales kick), Drive: 2 plays, 80 yards, 0:44	31–49
4	9:02	FIU	Bryce Singleton 2 yard pass from Alex McGough (José Borregales kick), Drive: 5 plays, 45 yards, 2:32	31–56
4	7:16	UMass	Marquis Young 29 yard pass from Andrew Ford (Logan Laurent kick), Drive: 5 plays, 65 yards, 1:46	38–56
4	2:28	FIU	Napoleon Maxwell 1 yard run (José Borregales kick), Drive: 10 plays, 75 yards, 4:48	38–63
4	0:21	UMass	Ross Comis 6 yard run (Logan Laurent kick), Drive: 8 plays, 71 yards, 2:07	45–63
