= 2016 UMass Minutemen football team =

American college football season

2016 UMass Minutemen football
- Conference: Independent
- Record: 2–10
- Head coach: Mark Whipple (9th season)
- Offensive scheme: Pro-style
- Defensive coordinator: Tom Masella (5th season)
- Base defense: 3–4
- Home stadium: Gillette Stadium; Warren McGuirk Alumni Stadium

2016 NCAA Division I FBS independents football records
| | Conf. | | | Overall |
| Team | W | | L | W | | L |
|---|---|---|---|---|---|---|
| BYU | | – | | 9 | – | 4 |
| Army | | – | | 8 | – | 5 |
| Notre Dame | | – | | 4 | – | 8 |
| UMass | | – | | 2 | – | 10 |
Rankings from AP Poll

The 2016 UMass Minutemen football team represented the University of Massachusetts Amherst in the 2016 NCAA Division I FBS football season. This is their third year with head coach Mark Whipple. The Minutemen divided their home schedule between two stadiums. Three home games were played at Gillette Stadium in Foxborough, Massachusetts and the other three games on the UMass campus at Warren McGuirk Alumni Stadium. This was UMass's first season as an independent. They finished the season 2–10.

== Schedule ==
| Date | Time | Opponent | Site | TV | Result | Attendance |
|---|---|---|---|---|---|---|
| September 3 | 7:30 p.m. | at No. 25 Florida | Ben Hill Griffin Stadium; Gainesville, FL | SECN | L 7–24 | 88,121 |
| September 10 | 12:00 p.m. | Boston College | Gillette Stadium; Foxboro, MA (rivalry) | ASN/ESPN3 | L 7–26 | 25,112 |
| September 17 | 3:30 p.m. | FIU | Warren McGuirk Alumni Stadium; Hadley, MA | ASN/ESPN3 | W 21–13 | 12,202 |
| September 24 | 3:30 p.m. | Mississippi State | Gillette Stadium; Foxboro, MA | ASN/ESPN3 | L 35–47 | 13,074 |
| October 1 | 3:30 p.m. | Tulane^{†} | Warren McGuirk Alumni Stadium; Hadley, MA | ASN/ESPN3 | L 24–31 | 14,892 |
| October 7^{[a]} | 8:00 p.m. | at Old Dominion | Foreman Field; Norfolk, VA | CUSA.tv | L 16–36 | 20,118 |
| October 15 | 3:30 p.m. | Louisiana Tech | Gillette Stadium; Foxboro, MA | ASN/ESPN3 | L 28–56 | 13,311 |
| October 22 | 12:00 p.m. | at South Carolina | Williams-Brice Stadium; Columbia, SC | SECN | L 28–34 | 73,428 |
| October 29 | 12:00 p.m. | Wagner | Warren McGuirk Alumni Stadium; Hadley, MA | ASN/ESPN3 | W 34–10 | 8,468 |
| November 5 | 3:30 p.m. | at Troy | Veterans Memorial Stadium; Troy, AL | ESPN3 | L 31–52 | 21,763 |
| November 19 | 2:00 p.m. | at BYU | LaVell Edwards Stadium; Provo, UT | BYUtv/ESPN3 | L 9–51 | 51,190 |
| November 26 | 11:00 p.m. | at Hawaii | Aloha Stadium; Honolulu, HI | Oceanic PPV | L 40–46 | 22,739 |
^{†}Homecoming; Rankings from AP Poll released prior to the game; All times are in Eastern time

^{^[a]}The game between Massachusetts and Old Dominion on October 8, 2016, was rescheduled due to Hurricane Matthew. The game was moved a day sooner to October 7, 2016 with an 8:00pm kickoff.
Schedule source:

== Game summaries ==
=== Florida ===
| | 1 | 2 | 3 | 4 | Total |
|---|---|---|---|---|---|
| Minutemen | 0 | 7 | 0 | 0 | 7 |
| #25 Gators | 7 | 3 | 0 | 14 | 24 |

- Broadcasters: Tom Hart, Andre Ware, Cole Cubelic

=== Boston College ===
| | 1 | 2 | 3 | 4 | Total |
|---|---|---|---|---|---|
| Eagles | 0 | 13 | 6 | 7 | 26 |
| Minutemen | 7 | 0 | 0 | 0 | 7 |

- Broadcasters: Eric Frede, Andy Gresh

=== FIU ===
| | 1 | 2 | 3 | 4 | Total |
|---|---|---|---|---|---|
| Panthers | 3 | 0 | 10 | 0 | 13 |
| Minutemen | 0 | 14 | 7 | 0 | 21 |

- Broadcasters: John Rooke, Pete Brock

=== Mississippi State ===
| | 1 | 2 | 3 | 4 | Total |
|---|---|---|---|---|---|
| Bulldogs | 3 | 10 | 28 | 6 | 47 |
| Minutemen | 7 | 7 | 7 | 14 | 35 |

- Broadcasters: Eric Frede, Andy Gresh

=== Tulane ===
| | 1 | 2 | 3 | 4 | Total |
|---|---|---|---|---|---|
| Green Wave | 7 | 3 | 14 | 7 | 31 |
| Minutemen | 14 | 0 | 0 | 10 | 24 |

- Broadcasters: Eric Frede, Andy Gresh

=== Old Dominion ===
| | 1 | 2 | 3 | 4 | Total |
|---|---|---|---|---|---|
| Minutemen | 0 | 9 | 7 | 0 | 16 |
| Monarchs | 10 | 9 | 10 | 7 | 36 |

- Broadcasters: Ted Alexander, Andy Mashaw, Doug Ripley

=== Louisiana Tech ===
| | 1 | 2 | 3 | 4 | Total |
|---|---|---|---|---|---|
| Bulldogs | 7 | 21 | 14 | 14 | 56 |
| Minutemen | 7 | 7 | 7 | 7 | 28 |

- Broadcasters: Eric Frede, Andy Gresh, Hali Oughton

=== South Carolina ===
| | 1 | 2 | 3 | 4 | Total |
|---|---|---|---|---|---|
| Minutemen | 0 | 14 | 0 | 14 | 28 |
| Gamecocks | 14 | 13 | 7 | 0 | 34 |

- Broadcasters: Tom Hart, Andre Ware, Cole Cubelic

=== Wagner ===
| | 1 | 2 | 3 | 4 | Total |
|---|---|---|---|---|---|
| Seahawks | 0 | 0 | 3 | 7 | 10 |
| Minutemen | 14 | 13 | 7 | 0 | 34 |

- Broadcasters: John Rooke, Pete Brock

=== Troy ===
| | 1 | 2 | 3 | 4 | Total |
|---|---|---|---|---|---|
| Minutemen | 14 | 3 | 7 | 7 | 31 |
| Trojans | 21 | 7 | 10 | 14 | 52 |

- Broadcasters: Matt Stewart, Tom O'Brien

=== BYU ===
| | 1 | 2 | 3 | 4 | Total |
|---|---|---|---|---|---|
| Minutemen | 6 | 3 | 0 | 0 | 9 |
| Cougars | 0 | 14 | 20 | 17 | 51 |

- Broadcasters: Dave McCann, Blaine Fowler, Lauren Francom

=== Hawaii ===
| | 1 | 2 | 3 | 4 | Total |
|---|---|---|---|---|---|
| Minutemen | 3 | 10 | 13 | 14 | 40 |
| Rainbow Warriors | 10 | 14 | 9 | 13 | 46 |

- Broadcasters: Robert Kekaula, Rich Miano, Scott Robbs
