= Blake Frohnapfel =

American football player (born 1992)

No. 15, 7
- Position: Quarterback

Personal information
- Born: October 19, 1992 (age 34)
- Listed height: 6 ft 5 in (1.96 m)
- Listed weight: 230 lb (104 kg)

Career information
- High school: Colonial Forge (Stafford, Virginia)
- College: Marshall (2011–2013); UMass (2014–2015)

Awards and highlights
- First-team All-MAC (2014)
- Stats at Pro Football Reference

Blake Frohnapfel (born October 19, 1992) is an American former college football quarterback who played for the Marshall Thundering Herd and UMass Minutemen.

== Early life ==
Blake Frohnapfel was born on October 19, 1992. He played high school football at Colonial Forge High School in Stafford, Virginia. As a senior, he completed 95 of 159 passes for 1,733 yards while also rushing for 257 yards. He threw for more than 4,000 yards and 50 touchdowns overall in high school. Frohnapfel was a two-time Commonwealth Player of the Year and also earned all-region and all-area honors.

== College career ==
Frohnapfel first played college football for the Marshall Thundering Herd of Marshall University. He redshirted the 2011 season. He was the backup to Rakeem Cato from 2012 to 2013. Frohnapfel finished his Marshall career with totals of 35 completions on 45 passing attempts (77.8%) for 386 yards, five touchdowns, and two interceptions. He also rushed for 164 yards and two touchdowns. He graduated from Marshall in May 2014.

Frohnapfel transferred to play for the UMass Minutemen of the University of Massachusetts Amherst from 2014 to 2015. He played in ten games, all starts, in 2014, completing 241 of 437 passes (55.1%) for 3,345 yards, 23 touchdowns, and ten interceptions. He had two games of over 500 yards passing. Frohnapfel missed the final two games of the year with a broken leg. He earned first-team All-Mid-American Conference honors for his performance during the 2014 season. Going into the 2015 season, he was named to the watchlists for the Manning Award and Davey O'Brien Award. He was also named an NFF National Scholar-Athlete. Frohnapfel played in all 12 games in 2015, recording 266 completions on 472 attempts (56.4%) for 2,919 yards, 16 touchdowns, and 13 interceptions while also scoring a rushing touchdown. He was named to the 2016 East–West Shrine Game.

== Professional career ==
In July 2015, USA Today called Frohnapfel "the best QB you've never heard of". However, his production dropped during the 2015 season. He was ultimately ranked the 22nd best quarterback in the 2016 NFL draft by NFLDraftScout.com. The company, Sage, produced several draft prospect football cards of Frohnapfel. Lance Zierlein of NFL.com said "Frohnapfel might have NFL size, but he doesn't have enough arm to overcome the turnovers that could plague him thanks to his slow release and penchant for looking down targets." Frohnapfel went undrafted, and attended rookie minicamp on a tryout basis with the Indianapolis Colts.

== Personal life ==
Frohnapfel's twin brother, tight end Eric Frohnapfel, played football with Blake at Marshall. Eric later played for the San Diego Chargers during the 2015 preseason. As of 2015, Blake and Eric were one of only two sets of twins in NCAA Division I history to connect on a touchdown together.
