= 2013 Bowling Green Falcons football team =

American college football season

2013 Bowling Green Falcons football

MAC champion MAC East Division champion

MAC Championship Game, W 47–27 vs. Northern Illinois

Little Caesars Pizza Bowl, L 27–30 vs. Pittsburgh
- Conference: Mid-American Conference
- East Division
- Record: 10–4 (7–1 MAC)
- Head coach: Dave Clawson (5th season)
- Offensive coordinator: Warren Ruggiero (5th season)
- Defensive coordinator: Mike Elko
- Home stadium: Doyt Perry Stadium

2013 Mid-American Conference football standings
	Conf.			Overall
Team	W		L	W		L
East Division
Bowling Green x$	7	–	1	10	–	4
Buffalo	6	–	2	8	–	5
Ohio	4	–	4	7	–	6
Akron	4	–	4	5	–	7
Kent State	3	–	5	4	–	8
UMass	1	–	7	1	–	11
Miami (OH)	0	–	8	0	–	12
West Division
Northern Illinois x	8	–	0	12	–	2
Ball State	7	–	1	10	–	3
Toledo	5	–	3	7	–	5
Central Michigan	5	–	3	6	–	6
Eastern Michigan	1	–	7	2	–	10
Western Michigan	1	–	7	1	–	11
Championship: Bowling Green 47, Northern Illinois 27
$ – Conference champion; x – Division champion/co-champions

The 2013 Bowling Green Falcons football team represented Bowling Green State University in the 2013 NCAA Division I FBS football season. Through the 2013 MAC Championship Game, the Falcons were led by fifth-year head coach Dave Clawson. On December 10, Clawson left to become the new head coach at Wake Forest; the school named special teams coordinator Adam Scheier as interim head coach for the 2013 Little Caesars Pizza Bowl.

The Falcons played their home games at Doyt Perry Stadium. They were a member of the East Division of the Mid-American Conference.

== Schedule ==
Date	Time	Opponent	Site	TV	Result	Attendance
August 29	7:00 pm	Tulsa*	Doyt Perry Stadium; Bowling Green, OH	ESPNU	W 34–7	18,142
September 7	12:00 pm	at Kent State	Dix Stadium; Kent, OH (Battle for the Anniversary Award)	ESPN+	W 41–22	22,758
September 14	12:00 pm	at Indiana*	Memorial Stadium; Bloomington, IN	ESPNU	L 10–42	41,869
September 21	3:30 pm	Murray State*	Doyt Perry Stadium; Bowling Green, OH	BCSN	W 48–7	16,094
September 28	2:30 pm	Akron	Doyt Perry Stadium; Bowling Green, OH	ESPN3	W 31–14	13,262
October 5	3:30 pm	Massachusetts^{†}	Doyt Perry Stadium; Bowling Green, OH	BCSN	W 28–7	13,799
October 12	7:30 pm	at Mississippi State*	Davis Wade Stadium; Starkville, MS	ESPN3	L 20–21	55,148
October 26	2:30 pm	Toledo	Doyt Perry Stadium; Bowling Green, OH (Battle of I-75)	ESPN3	L 25–28	21,724
November 5	8:00 pm	at Miami (OH)	Yager Stadium; Oxford, OH	ESPNU	W 45–3	10,598
November 12	7:30 pm	Ohio	Doyt Perry Stadium; Bowling Green, OH	ESPN3	W 49–0	8,527
November 23	1:00 pm	at Eastern Michigan	Rynearson Stadium; Ypsilanti, MI	ESPN3	W 58–7	1,751
November 29	1:30 pm	vs. Buffalo	Ralph Wilson Stadium; Orchard Park, NY	ESPNU	W 24–7	26,226
December 6	8:00 pm	vs. No. 16 Northern Illinois	Ford Field; Detroit, MI (MAC Championship Game)	ESPN2	W 47–27	21,106
December 26	6:00 pm	vs. Pittsburgh*	Ford Field; Detroit, MI (Little Caesars Pizza Bowl)	ESPN	L 27–30	26,259
*Non-conference game; ^{†}Homecoming; Rankings from AP Poll Poll released prior to the game; All times are in Eastern time

== Game summaries ==
=== Tulsa ===
Tulsa Golden Hurricane (0-0) at Bowling Green Falcons (0-0) – Game summary

Quarter	1	2	3	4	Total
Tulsa	0	0	0	7	7
Bowling Green	3	3	7	21	34

at Doyt Perry Stadium • Bowling Green, Ohio

- Date: August 29, 2013
- Game time: 7:00 p.m. EDT
- Game attendance: 18,142
- TV announcers (ESPNU): Joe Davis (play-by-play), David Diaz-Infante (analyst)

Game information

First quarter

- 3:29 BGSU Tyler Tate 34 yard field goal

Second quarter

- 0:02 BGSU Tyler Tate 28 yard field goal

Third quarter

- 12:09 BGSU William Houston 1 yard run (Tyler Tate kick)

Fourth quarter

- 13:52 BGSU William Houston 1 yard run (Tyler Tate kick)
- 7:34 BGSU William Houston 1 yard run (Tyler Tate kick)
- 6:48 BGSU Ryan Burbrink 67 yard punt return (Tyler Tate kick)
- 5:56 TLSA Derek Patterson 27 yard pass from Dane Evans (Kenneth Salazar kick)

Bowling Green opened its season with a 34-7 victory on August 29 against the Tulsa Golden Hurricane who were the reigning Conference USA champions in front of a crowd of 18,142 at Doyt Perry Stadium. After just 26 yards gained on the first two drives, Bowling Green starting quarterback Matt Schilz was replaced by Matt Johnson who led the Falcons on an eight play 41 yard drive which resulted in a Tyler Tate 34 yard field goal. Late in the first quarter, the Golden Hurricane's were in Bowling Green's territory where Gabe Martin would deflect a would-be third down completion in the end zone. Tulsa's kicker Carl Salazar would miss a 37 yard field goal attempt the next play wide right.

In the second quarter, Tulsa's Dwight Dobbins would intercept quarterback Matt Johnson's pass resulting in the first turnover of the game. With Tulsa driving inside the 20 yard line, Cody Green completed a pass to Derek Patterson for 16 yards, who fumbled, and recovered by Aaron Foster at the BwGrn 2 yard line. After a Bowling Green punt, Tulsa started their drive at the BwGrn 33 yard line. However, Tulsa could not turn the drive into points as kicker Carl Salazar would miss a 34 yard field goal, once again wide right. Bowling Green would then drive 70 yards on 15 plays, resulting in a Tyler Tate 28 yard field goal to make the score 6-0 at halftime.

Bowling Green received the second half kickoff and marched right down the field for the first touchdown of the game. A six play, 75 yard drive was sparked by a 37 yard Ronnie Moore rush, followed by a 12 yard Travis Greene rush who was tackled at the 1 yard line. Former preferred Ohio State walk-on William Houston would score a 1 yard touchdown the following play. Both teams would punt their next two possessions. With nine seconds remaining in the third quarter, Tulsa was lining up to punt on their own 16 yard line facing a 4th and one but decided to run a fake punt with their punter Cole Way who was stopped by Cameron Truss for no gain. Houston would score his second one yard touchdown of the game giving Bowling Green a 20-0 lead with 13:52 remaining in the game. After a Tulsa turnover on downs, Bowling Green was forced to punt, but the punt was fumbled by Tulsa's Trey Watts inside their own 10 yard line and recovered by BwGrn. Two plays later, Houston would score his third one yard rushing touchdown. The following drive, Dane Evans came in at quarterback for Tulsa. After a three and out, returner Ryan Burbrink would score on a 67 yard punt return. Evans would throw a 27 yard touchdown pass to Derek Patterson to get Tulsa on the scoreboard with 5:56 remaining. Bowling Green would run out the remainder of the clock, to earn their first victory of the season.

Statistics	Tulsa	Bowling Green
First downs	12	23
Plays–yards	273	396
Rushes–yards	24-51	53-233
Passing yards	222	163
Passing: comp–att–int	20-41-0	12-28-1
Time of possession	27:25	38:40

Team	Category	Player	Statistics
Tulsa	Passing	Cody Green	17/34, 172 yards
Tulsa	Rushing	Ja'Terian Douglas	12 carries, 22 yards
Tulsa	Receiving	Keyarris Garrett	5 receptions, 54 yards
Bowling Green	Passing	Matt Johnson	11/23, 151 yards, 1 INT
Bowling Green	Rushing	Travis Greene	22 carries, 88 yards
Bowling Green	Receiving	Shaun Joplin	2 receptions, 40 yards

=== At Kent State ===
Bowling Green Falcons (1-0) at Kent State Golden Flashes (1-0) – Game summary

Quarter	1	2	3	4	Total
Bowling Green	7	17	10	7	41
Kent State	8	14	0	0	22

at Dix Stadium • Kent, Ohio

- Date: September 7, 2013
- Game time: 12:00 p.m. EDT
- Game weather: Temperature: 73 °F (23 °C) • Wind: SW 8 MPH • Weather: Mostly Sunny
- Game attendance: 22,758
- TV announcers (ESPN Plus): Michael Reghi (play-by-play), Doug Graber (analyst)

Game information

First quarter

- 10:22 BGSU Travis Greene 1 yard run (Tyler Tate kick)
- 7:52 KENT Chris Humphrey 42 yard pass from Colin Reardon ( Humphrey 2-point rush)

Second quarter

- 14:46 BGSU Tyler Tate 30 yard field goal
- 9:40 KENT Casey Pierce 12 yard pass from Colin Reardon (Anthony Melchiori kick)
- 6:57 BGSU Andre Givens 3 yard run (Tyler Tate kick)
- 4:40 KENT Trayion Durham 2 yard run (Anthony Melchiori kick)
- 0:54 BGSU Jared Cohen 7 yard pass from Matt Johnson (Tyler Tate kick)

Third quarter

- 6:29 BGSU Tyler Tate 41 yard field goal
- 4:33 BGSU Ryan Burbrink 92 yard pass from Matt Johnson (Tyler Tate kick)

Fourth quarter

- 12:51 BGSU William Houston 1 yard run (Tyler Tate kick)

In the 81st career meeting, Bowling Green led the series 55-19-6 all-time vs Kent State, despite dropping the last three. The Golden Flashes would be without Heisman hopeful running back Dri Archer who sustained a leg injury the previous week vs Liberty. Quarterback Matt Johnson would start his first career game for Bowling Green. Johnson took the Orange and Brown right down the field on the first drive of the game. The nine play 77 yard drive was capped off by a Travis Greene 1 yard touchdown run. On Kent State's first drive, quarterback Colin Reardon connected with wide receiver Chris Humphrey on a 42 yard play-action touchdown pass. Humphrey then took a direct snap and converted the two-point conversion to give the Golden Flashes an 8-7 lead.

After both teams traded punts, Bowling Green kicker Tyler Tate connected on a 30 yard field goal, giving BG the lead 10-8. Kent State followed with a 12 yard touchdown pass on 3rd and 8 when Colin Reardon connected with tight end Casey Pierce. The play originally seemed to be a speed option to the right out of shotgun formation, but Reardon then dropped back to pass finding Pierce on the left seem. Bowling Green responded with a 6 play 75 yard touchdown drive which ended in a 3 yard Andre Givens touchdown run. The following Kent State drive, Reardon had a 42 yard scamper on a read-option down to the BG 21 yard line. Two plays later, running back Trayion Durham would score on a two yard rushing touchdown. With just 54 seconds left in the half, Johnson would find wide receiver Jared Cohen on the front right pylon for a 7 yard touchdown. The play was originally called down at the one yard line, but was overturned to a touchdown after video review, giving the Falcons a 24-22 lead entering the break.

After Kent State's opening drive stalled in the second half, Bowling Green kicker Tyler Tate would make a 41 yard field increasing the lead to five. After another Golden Flashes punt, the Falcons were facing a 3rd and 15 from their own eight yard line when Johnson connected with Ryan Burbrink on a 92 yard touchdown pass extending the lead to a two possession game. BGSU William Houston scored a 1 yard touchdown to cap of the scoring in the 4th quarter, making the score 41-22. The Falcons defense shutout Kent State's offense in the second half. Bowling Green advanced to 2-0 on the season and 1-0 in MAC play.

Statistics	Bowling Green	Kent State
First downs	26	15
Plays–yards	576	302
Rushes–yards	46-219	28-138
Passing yards	357	164
Passing: comp–att–int	19-25-0	15-28-0
Time of possession	36:32	23:28

Team	Category	Player	Statistics
Bowling Green	Passing	Matt Johnson	19/25, 357 yards, 2 TDS
Bowling Green	Rushing	Travis Greene	24 carries, 145 yards, 1 TD
Bowling Green	Receiving	Shaun Joplin	6 receptions, 113 yards
Kent State	Passing	Colin Reardon	15/28, 164 yards, 2 TDS
Kent State	Rushing	Colin Reardon	12 carries, 58 yards
Kent State	Receiving	Chris Humphrey	4 receptions, 84 yards, 1 TD

=== At Kent State ===
Bowling Green Falcons (2-0) at Indiana Hoosiers (1-1) – Game summary

Quarter	1	2	3	4	Total
Bowling Green	7	3	0	0	10
Indiana	7	14	7	14	42

at Memorial Stadium • Bloomington, IN

- Date: September 14, 2013
- Game time: 12:00 p.m. EDT
- Game weather: Temperature:
- Game attendance: 41,869
- TV announcers (ESPNU): Tom Hart (play-by-play), John Congemi (analyst)

Game information

First quarter

- 9:38 IND Tevin Coleman 1 yard run (Mitch Ewald kick)
- 4:36 BGSU Paul Senn 56 yard punt return (Tyler Tate kick)

Second quarter

- 11:06 BGSU Tyler Tate 45 yard field goal
- 8:20 IND Tevin Coleman 43 yard run (Mitch Ewald kick)
- 2:44 IND Kofi Hughes 8 yard pass from Nate Sudfeld (Mitch Ewald kick)

Third quarter

- 10:11 IND Cody Latimer 33 yard pass from Nate Sudfeld (Mitch Ewald kick)

Fourth quarter

- 14:23 IND Nate Sudfeld 1 yard run (Mitch Ewald kick)
- 11:40 IND Tre Roberson 3 yard run (Mitch Ewald kick)

The undefeated Bowling Green Falcons traveled into Memorial Stadium where they would play he Indiana Hoosiers in front of 41,869. Indiana went right down the field their first drive, but were stopped at the goal line by BGSU's defense. Following a BG punt in their own territory, IU running back Tevin Coleman scored his fourth rushing touchdown of the season from one yard out. A promising second drive by the Falcons resulted in no points when kicker Tyler Tate missed a 47 yard field goal. Following a Hoosier's three and out, Bowling Green's Paul Senn blocked and returned a 56 yard punt in the same motion, making the score 7-7 with 4:36 in the first quarter. Indiana was once again stopped on the goal line when they substituted starting quarterback Nate Sudfeld for Tre Roberson on fourth and goal from the one yard line when he fumbled the snap. Bowling Green would then go on an 11 play 72 yard drive which resulted in a Tate 45 yard field goal to make the score 10-7 BG. Indiana would fumble the ensuing kick off, however Bowling Green was stopped on a fourth and one from the 21 yard line when quarterback Matt Johnson was stopped on a draw from shotgun formation. Indiana would take advantage of the turnover when Coleman scored on a 43 yard option pitch. The Falcons next drive stalled at midfield where they would punt to Indiana. Sudfeld would connect with Kofi Hughes on an eight yard fade right to the back right pylon making the score 21-10 with 2:44 in the second quarter. Johnson led the Falcons down the field with under a minute until the break where Tate would miss a 32 yard field goal attempt off the left upright.

Indiana would attempt an onside kick to start the second half, but the ball went out of bounces untouched giving BGSU the ball at IU's 42 yard line. Threatening inside the 20 yard line, Johnson's pass was intercepted after hitting the hands of wide receiver Chris Gallon. Indiana would take advantage of the turnover when Sudfeld connected with wide receiver Cody Latimer on a 33 yard touchdown pass, increasing IU's lead to 28-10. With three minutes to go in the third quarter, Bowling Green was stopped on another fourth and one on IU's 19 yard line. Indiana would then go on a nine play 80 yard drive capped off by a 1 yard read option keeper by Sudfeld. Bowling Green did not have an answer as wide receiver Shaun Joplin would fumble a catch on their second play of the drive. Roberson would end the scoring with a three yard touchdown. Indiana would surpass over 600 yards of total offense. Running back Tevin Coleman had 19 carries for 129 yards and two touchdowns. Stephen Houston had 155 yards on just 13 carries.

Statistics	Bowling Green	Indiana
First downs	24	25
Plays–yards	409	601
Rushes–yards	36-136	48-266
Passing yards	273	335
Passing: comp–att–int	28-51-1	17-26-0
Time of possession	35:13	24:55

Team	Category	Player	Statistics
Bowling Green	Passing	Matt Johnson	25/44, 248 yards, 1INT
Bowling Green	Rushing	Travis Greene	11 carries, 43 yards
Bowling Green	Receiving	Shaun Joplin	7 receptions, 104 yards
Indiana	Passing	Nate Sudfeld	17/26, 335 yards, 2 TDS
Indiana	Rushing	Stephen Houston	13 carries, 155 yards, 2 TDS
Indiana	Receiving	Cody Latimer	6 receptions, 137 yards, 1 TD

=== Murray State ===
Murray State Racers (2-1) at Bowling Green Falcons (2-1) – Game summary

Quarter	1	2	3	4	Total
Murray State	0	0	7	0	7
Bowling Green	6	21	14	7	48

at Doyt Perry Stadium • Bowling Green, Ohio

- Date: September 21, 2013
- Game time: 3:30 p.m. EDT
- Game weather: Temperature: 68 °F (20 °C) • Wind: NW 15 MPH • Weather: Partly Cloudy
- Game attendance: 16,094
- TV announcers (BCSN): John Gregory (play-by-play), Dave Weekley (analyst)

Game information

First quarter

- 7:40 BGSU Chris Gallon 4 yard pass from Matt Johnson(Tyler Tate kick no good)

Second quarter

- 12:13 BGSU Travis Greene 8 yard run (Tyler Tate kick)
- 8:31 BGSU Matt Johnson 7 yard run (Tyler Tate kick)
- 0:07 BGSU Chris Gallon 1 yard pass from Matt Johnson (Tyler Tate kick)

Third quarter

- 11:47 BGSU Andre Givens 9 yard run (Tyler Tate kick)
- 8:10 MURR Jaamal Berry 2 yard run ( kick)
- 4:56 BGSU William Houston 1 yard run (Tyler Tate kick)

Fourth quarter

- 2:31 BGSU Ronnie Moore 17 yard pass from James Knapke (Tyler Tate kick)

The Bowling Green Falcons hosted the Murray State Racers in their fourth game of the season at Doyt Perry Stadium. Both teams punted on their first possession of the game. The Falcons started the scoring off on a four yard touchdown catch by Chris Gallon from quarterback Matt Johnson on third and goal. Kicker Tyler Tate missed the extra point, leaving the score at 6-0 with 7:40 remaining. The first turnover of the game came on a Matt Johnson interception. Following the turnover, the Racers would return the favor when quarterback Maikhail Miller fumbled the ball at Bowling Green's one yard line. Bowling Green would capitalize off of the turnover driving 99 yards on an 11 play drive, capped off by a Travis Greene eight yard run touchdown run. After a Racers three and out, Bowling Green scored a touchdown on their second consecutive drive. Matt Johnson scored on a seven yard touchdown run out of the pistol formation. After another Racers punt, Bowling Green would start their next drive from their own three yard line. The orange and brown would drive 97 yards on 16 plays scoring a touchdown with just seven seconds remaining in the half. Gallon caught a one yard touchdown pass from Johnson, his second of the game.

Bowling Green started the second half with 376 total yards of offense and 20 first downs. After a Racers punt, the Falcons would score a touchdown on their fourth consecutive drive. The drive was highlighted with an Alex Bayer 37 yard catch. On the following play, Andre Givens would score on a 9 yard touchdown run. Murray State would respond with an 83 yard 13 play touchdown drive of their own, which was capped off by Ohio State transfer Jaamal Berry's two yard touchdown run. The Falcons would go on to score two more touchdowns on the day. The first came on a William Houston one yard touchdown run, making it five consecutive drives with a touchdown. After Bowling Green's Jude Adjei-Barimah sack on third down, Racers kicker Jeremy Brackett missed 33 yard field goal attempt. BG Backup quarterback James Knapke would throw his first collegiate touchdown pass to Ronnie Moore late in the fourth quarter to end the scoring. Murray State's star receiver Walt Powell was held to just 17 yards on three catches.

Statistics	Murray State	Bowling Green
First downs	17	32
Plays–yards	312	660
Rushes–yards	32-166	42-282
Passing yards	146	378
Passing: comp–att–int	24-34-0	28-32-1
Time of possession	24:25	35:35

Team	Category	Player	Statistics
Murray State	Passing	Maikhail Miller	22/32, 134 yards
Murray State	Rushing	Jaamal Berry	9 carries, 55 yards, 1 TD
Murray State	Receiving	Nevar Griffin	5 receptions, 42 yards
Bowling Green	Passing	Matt Johnson	19/22, 244 yards, 2TDS, 1INT
Bowling Green	Rushing	Travis Greene	17 carries, 133 yards, 1TD
Bowling Green	Receiving	Alex Bayer	4 receptions, 65 yards

=== Akron ===
Akron Zips (1-3) at Bowling Green Falcons (3-1) – Game summary

Quarter	1	2	3	4	Total
Akron	14	0	0	0	14
Bowling Green	3	7	14	7	31

at Doyt Perry Stadium • Bowling Green, Ohio

- Date: September 28, 2013
- Game time: 2:30 p.m. EDT
- Game weather: Temperature: 80 °F (27 °C) • Wind: W 5 MPH • Weather: Sunny & Clear
- Game attendance: 13,262
- TV announcers (ESPN3): Michael Reghi (play-by-play), Rocky Boiman (analyst)

Game information

First quarter

- 2:38 AKR L.T. Smith 51 yard pass from Kyle Pohl (Robert Stein kick)
- 9:31 BGSU Tyler Tate 29 yard field goal
- 5:39 AKR Kyle Pohl 3 yard run (Robert Stein kick)

Second quarter

- 1:41 BGSU Shaun Joplin 22 yard pass from Matt Johnson (Tyler Tate kick)

Third quarter

- 6:47 BGSU William Houston 2 yard run (Tyler Tate kick)
- 1:41 BGSU Travis Greene 30 yard pass from Matt Johnson (Tyler Tate kick)

Fourth quarter

- 4:49 BGSU Travis Greene 11 yard run (Tyler Tate kick)

The Akron Zips came into Doyt Perry Stadium trailing the Bowling Green Falcons 7-12 all time. After a Falcons three and out, the Zips' connected on a 51 yard touchdown pass from Kyle Pohl to L.T. Smith to start the scoring. Running back Travis Greene started the Falcons next drive with two carries for 46 yards with a long of 32. The drive would result in a Tyler Tate 29 yard field goal, making the score 7-3. Akron responded with a 12 play 72 yard touchdown drive which resulted with a three yard touchdown run from Pohl on a keeper. After six consecutive punts, three from each team, the Falcons would respond with a 22 yard juggling touchdown catch to receiver Shaun Joplin to make the score 14-10 heading into the half.

After a Zips three and out to start the half, Bowling Green would go on an 11 play 69 yard touchdown drive which was capped off by a two yard William Houston touchdown run. After another Zips punt, the Falcons would increase their lead the following possession when Matt Johnson would connect with Travis Greene on a 30 yard touchdown pass making the score 24-14. Akron's following drive was stalled at the BG one yard line, when Zips kicker Robert Stein would miss a 17 yard field goal attempt off the left upright. Bowling Green Running back Travis Greene would score from 11 yards out which would end a 13 play 80 yard drive and make the score 31-14.

Greene was the game's leading rusher with 142 yards and a touchdown on 24 carries. Greene's game total, in 28 touches, was 213 yards and two scores. He led BGSU to a 167-97 edge in rushing yards. On defense, Aaron Foster led the way with ten tackles, including one of the team's three tackles for loss. Akron's loss dropped their record to 1-4 overall and 0-1 in the Mid-American Conference. Bowling Green's victory gave the Falcons a 4-1 record overall and a 2-0 mark in the MAC.

Statistics	Akron	Bowling Green
First downs	19	22
Plays–yards	296	396
Rushes–yards	25-97	44-167
Passing yards	199	229
Passing: comp–att–int	22-37-0	18-24-0
Time of possession	23:42	36:03

Team	Category	Player	Statistics
Akron	Passing	Kyle Pohl	22/37, 199 yards, 1TD
Akron	Rushing	Jawon Chisholm	9 carries, 28 yards
Akron	Receiving	L.T. Smith	5 receptions, 89 yards, 1TD
Bowling Green	Passing	Matt Johnson	18/24, 229 yards, 2TDS
Bowling Green	Rushing	Travis Greene	24 carries, 142 yards, 1TD
Bowling Green	Receiving	Shaun Joplin	5 receptions, 78 yards, 1TD

=== Massachusetts ===
Massachusetts Minutemen (0-4) at Bowling Green Falcons (4-1) – Game summary

Quarter	1	2	3	4	Total
UMass	0	0	0	7	7
Bowling Green	0	14	14	0	28

at Doyt Perry Stadium • Bowling Green, Ohio

- Date: October 5, 2013
- Game time: 3:30 p.m. EDT
- Game weather: Temperature: 71 °F (22 °C) • Wind: SSW 8 MPH • Weather: Partly Cloudy
- Game attendance: 13,799
- TV announcers (BCSN): Greg Franke (play-by-play), Tom Cole (analyst), Rick Poland (sideline reporter)

Game information

Second quarter

- 7:51 BGSU Ronnie Moore 51 yard pass from Matt Johnson (Tyler Tate kick)
- 1:15 BGSU William Houston 1 yard run (Tyler Tate kick)

Third quarter

- 10:10 BGSU Tyler Beck 23 yard pass from Matt Johnson (Tyler Tate kick)
- 5:10 BGSU Heath Jackson 9 yard pass from Matt Johnson (Tyler Tate kick)

Fourth quarter

- 4:34 UMASS Tajae Sharpe 24 yard pass from Mike Wegzyn (Blake Lucas kick)

Bowling Green hosted Massachusetts for their 2013 Homecoming. After a slow start by both teams, Bowling Green quarterback Matt Johnson connected with Ronnie Moore on a 51 yard touchdown pass to give the Falcons a 7-0 lead with 7:51 remaining in the first half. BGSU running back William Houston expanded the lead to 14 with just 1:15 remaining in the half on a one yard touchdown run for his team high seventh touchdown on the year.

After a UMass punt to start the second half, Johnson would throw a 23 yard touchdown pass to Tyler Beck making the score 21-0. On the Falcons next possession, Johnson would throw his third touchdown pass of the game to Heath Jackson on a nine yard score. In the late third quarter, Massachusetts quarterback A.J. Doyle would be replaced by Mike Wegzyn. Driving in BG territory, cornerback Ryland Ward would intercept Wegzyn for the Falcons first interception of the season. UMass would reach the end zone on their final possession of the game when Wegzyn connected with wide receiver Tajae Sharpe on a 24 yard touchdown catch.

Statistics	Massachusetts	Bowling Green
First downs	15	21
Plays–yards	280	448
Rushes–yards	32-184	43-232
Passing yards	96	216
Passing: comp–att–int	11-25-1	13-22-0
Time of possession	27:37	32:23

Team	Category	Player	Statistics
Massachusetts	Passing	Mike Wegzyn	7/8, 76 yards, 1TD, 1INT
Massachusetts	Rushing	Jamal Wilson	20 carries, 119 yards
Massachusetts	Receiving	Tajae Sharpe	3 receptions, 38 yards, 1TD
Bowling Green	Passing	Matt Johnson	11/20, 166 yards, 3TDS
Bowling Green	Rushing	Travis Greene	22 carries, 160 yards
Bowling Green	Receiving	Ronnie Moore	3 receptions, 91 yards, 1TD

=== At Mississippi State ===
Bowling Green Falcons (5-1) at Mississippi State Bulldogs (2-3) – Game summary

Quarter	1	2	3	4	Total
Bowling Green	3	10	7	0	20
Mississippi State	14	7	0	0	21

at Davis Wade Stadium • Starkville, MS

- Date: October 12, 2013
- Game time: 7:30 p.m. EDT
- Game weather: Temperature:81 °F (27 °C) • Wind: Light • Weather: Clears skies, muggy
- Game attendance: 55,148
- TV announcers (SECN, Fox Sports Net): Bob Rathbun (play-by-play), Tim Couch (analyst), Elizabeth Moreau (sideline reporter)

Game information

First quarter

- 9:58 MSST Ladarius Perkins 1 yard run (Devon Bell kick)
- 5:36 BGSU Tyler Tate 35 yard field goal
- 5:24 MSST Dak Prescott 75 yard run (Devon Bell kick)

Second quarter

- 4:15 BGSU Andre Givens 7 yard run (Tyler Tate kick)
- 1:04 MSST Dak Prescott 10 yard run (Devon Bell kick)
- 0:00 BGSU Tyler Tate 45 yard field goal

Third quarter

- 3:57 BGSU Matt Johnson 2 yard run (Tyler Tate kick)

In the first head-to-head matchup in school history, the Bowling Green Falcons would travel to Davis Wade Stadium to face the Dan Mullen led Mississippi State Bulldogs. 55,148 fans were in attendance for MSU's 2013 homecoming. The Bulldogs went 75 yards on their first drive of the game and scored on a one yard touchdown rush from LaDarius Perkins. After a Bowling Green punt, defensive back Jerry "Boo Boo" Gates would intercept quarterback Dak Prescott's pass and return it to the MSU 13 yard line. The turnover would turn into a Tyler Tate 35 yard field goal. On the first play of the Bulldogs next possession, Prescott scored on a 75 yard touchdown run, making the score 14-3. In the second quarter, BG went on a six play 96 yard touchdown drive that was capped off by a seven yard Andre Givens touchdown run. Prescott would score his second rushing touchdown of the game on a 10 yard scamper to the pylon to make the score 21-10 with 1:04 remaining in the half. BGSU quarterback Matt Johnson would lead the Falcons down the field where Tyler Tate would connect on a 45 yard field goal as time expired. Gates was ejected in the second quarter for targeting.

Bowling Green's Tate missed a 45 yard field goal to start the second half. After a Bulldogs punt, the Falcons would go on a seven play 76 yard drive that ended in a Johnson two yard touchdown run. The following MSU drive, kicker Devon Bell would miss a 44 yard field goal that hit off the right upright. With nine minutes remaining, the Falcons were stopped on the Bulldogs 42 yard line on a fourth down and two following an incomplete pass. Mississippi State would also be stopped on downs when Prescott was stopped on two yard gain on fourth and three from Bowling Green's eight yard line. BG's next drive stalled on their on 45 yard line when a forth and 11 pass fell incomplete to Ryan Burbrink with under two minutes remaining.

Statistics	Bowling Green	Mississippi State
First downs	21	23
Plays–yards	384	422
Rushes–yards	29-160	41-245
Passing yards	224	177
Passing: comp–att–int	20-34-0	19-25-1
Time of possession	27:31	32:08

Team	Category	Player	Statistics
Bowling Green	Passing	Matt Johnson	20/34, 224 yards
Bowling Green	Rushing	Travis Greene	15 carries, 99 yards
Bowling Green	Receiving	Ryan Burbrink	4 receptions, 66 yards
Mississippi State	Passing	Tyler Russell	12/14, 102 yards
Mississippi State	Rushing	Dak Prescott	15 carries, 139 yards, 2 TDS
Mississippi State	Receiving	Joe Morrow	4 receptions, 57 yards

=== Toledo ===
Toledo Rockets (4-3) at Bowling Green Falcons (5-2) – Game summary

Quarter	1	2	3	4	Total
Toledo	7	14	0	7	28
Bowling Green	0	7	3	15	25

at Doyt Perry Stadium • Bowling Green, Ohio

- Date: October 26, 2013
- Game time: 2:30 p.m. EDT
- Game weather: Temperature: 49 °F (9 °C) • Wind: WSW 22 MPH • Weather: Mostly Cloudy/Windy
- Game attendance: 21,724
- TV announcers (ESPN3): Jim Barbar (play-by-play), Jerod Cherry (analyst)

Game information

First quarter

- 5:54 TOL Kareem Hunt 1 yard run (Jeremiah Detmer kick)

Second quarter

- 9:42 TOL Alonzo Russell 5 yard pass from Terrance Owens (Jeremiah Detmer kick)
- 4:27 TOL Bernard Reedy 9 yard pass from Terrance Owens (Jeremiah Detmer kick)
- 0:24 BGSU Matt Johnson 1 yard run (Tyler Tate kick)

Third quarter

- 8:46 BGSU Tyler Tate 23 yard field goal
- 5:10 BGSU Heath Jackson 9 yard pass from Matt Johnson (Tyler Tate kick)

Fourth quarter

- 14:34 BGSU Travis Greene 7 yard run (Alex Bayer 2-point pass)
- 5:59 BGSU Travis Greene 7 yard run (Tyler Tate kick)
- 1:22 TOL Alonzo Russell 11 yard pass from Terrance Owens (Jeremiah Detmer kick)

In the 78th Battle of I 75 rivalry, Bowling Green came in leading the series 39-34-4. The Falcons first drive would stall when they could not convert on a forth and eight from Toledo's 23 yard line. The Rockets quickly took advantage of the turnover on downs and went 77 yards on seven plays. Running back Kareem Hunt would score on a one yard touchdown run. The Rockets would keep the positive momentum and score on their next two drives which included back to back touchdown passes from quarterback Terrance Owens to Alonzo Russell and Bernard Reedy to give UT a 21-0 lead. BG responded with a 12 play 81 yard touchdown drive that was capped off by a one yard Matt Johnson touchdown run.

Bowling Green linebacker Gabe Martin forced a fumble on a sack that was recovered by D.J. Lynch on the Rockets first drive of the second half. Falcons kicker Tyler Tate connected on a 23 yard field goal following the fumble, making the score 21-10. Following a Toledo punt, Bowling Green went on a nine play 77 yard drive that was ended in a Travis Greene seven yard touchdown run. Johnson would connect with tight end Alex Bayer for the two-point conversion, making the score 21-18. The Falcon's defense forced another punt and proceeded to drive 84 yards on 10 plays to take a 25-21 lead on another seven yard touchdown run by Greene. Toledo would regain the lead for good on a forth and nine from the BG 11 yard line where Owens would find Russell in the end zone, making the score 28-25. With just over one minute remaining, the Falcons failed to convert on fourth and 13 from their own 32 yard line. Both teams went to 5-3 on the season and 3-1 in MAC play.

Statistics	Toledo	Bowling Green
First downs	21	19
Plays–yards	372	343
Rushes–yards	41-242	36-135
Passing yards	130	208
Passing: comp–att–int	15-23-0	17-26-0
Time of possession	30:47	28:17

Team	Category	Player	Statistics
Toledo	Passing	Terrance Owens	15/23, 130 yards, 3TDS
Toledo	Rushing	Kareem Hunt	21 carries, 114 yards
Toledo	Receiving	Alonzo Russell	8 receptions, 56 yards, 2TDS
Bowling Green	Passing	Matt Johnson	17/26, 208 yards
Bowling Green	Rushing	Travis Greene	19 carries, 96 yards
Bowling Green	Receiving	Heath Jackson	7 receptions, 72 yards

=== At Miami (OH) ===
Bowling Green Falcons (5-3) at Miami RedHawks (0-8) – Game summary

Quarter	1	2	3	4	Total
Bowling Green	7	17	21	0	45
Miami (OH)	3	0	0	0	3

at Yager Stadium • Oxford, OH

- Date: November 5, 2013
- Game time: 8:00 p.m. EDT
- Game weather: Temperature: 54 °F (12 °C) • Wind: E 3 MPH • Weather: Partly Cloudy
- Game attendance: 10,598
- TV announcers (ESPNU): Mark Neely (play-by-play), David Diaz-Infante (analyst)

Game information

First quarter

- 6:05 BGSU Shaun Joplin 6 yard pass from Matt Johnson (Tyler Tate kick)
- 0:55 M-OH Kaleb Patterson 51 yard field goal

Second quarter

- 9:15 BGSU Tyler Tate 29 yard field goal
- 6:45 BGSU William Houston 2 yard run (Tyler Tate kick)
- 1:19 BGSU Alex Bayer 18 yard pass from Matt Johnson (Tyler Tate kick)

Third quarter

- 7:04 BGSU Matt Johnson 1 yard run (Tyler Tate kick)
- 6:49 BGSU 11 yard fumble return by Jerry "Boo Boo" Gates (Tyler Tate kick)
- 2:43 BGSU Chris Pohlman 38 yard pass from Matt Johnson (Tyler Tate kick)

The Bowling Green Falcons traveled to Yager Stadium to play the winless Miami RedHawks. The RedHawks were without starting quarterback Austin Boucher who tore his ACL the previous week against Ohio. It was the 70th meeting between the two teams with the RedHawks leading the series 42-22-5. Freshman quarterback Austin Gearing earned his first start for Miami, who came into the game leading the team with 270 rushing yards. A promising first drive was stalled when Gearing took a 14 yard sack by linebacker Paul Senn that pushed the RedHawks back to the BG 44 yard line. After a Miami punt, Bowling Green marched 80 yards on nine plays for the game's first touchdown. Quarterback Matt Johnson connected with a Shaun Joplin on a six yard touchdown pass. Miami would respond with a 50 yard field goal from Kaleb Patterson to make the score 7-3. Bowling Green would answer with an impressive drive of their own when Johnson appeared to find Ryan Burbrink for an 18 yard juggling touchdown on third and three. However, after video review, the call was overturned. The Falcons would settle for a Tyler Tate 29 yard field goal. The following RedHawks drive, running back Spencer McInnis fumbled on a Paul Swan hit that was recovered by Jerry "Boo Boo" Gates to the Miami 29 yard line. The Falcons would cash in on the turnover in just four plays on a William Houston two yard touchdown run. After a Miami punt, the Falcons would score on their forth consecutive possession on a nine play 69 yard drive that was capped off by an Alex Bayer 18 yard touchdown catch.

The Falcons would receive to start the second half, however the drive would end in a Johnson interception. Trying to gain momentum, the RedHawks called a jet-sweep pass where wide receiver David Frazier was sacked by Ted Ouellet while he was attempting to wind up and throw, which was recovered by BG's Bryan Thomas. Johnson scored on a one yard touchdown run to increase the Falcons' lead to 31-3. Following the kickoff, the RedHawks ran a screen pass to wide receiver Dawan Scott who caught and fumbled the ball on a hit by Justin Ford. Gates would return the fumble for an 11 yard defensive scoop and score. The scoring was capped off when Chris Pohlman made a tough catch in traffic and shrugged off multiple tackles on a 38 yard touchdown catch from Johnson, the first in his collegiate career. This was BG's largest margin of victory in the 70-game rivalry. The Falcons also became bowl eligible with the 42 point victory.

Gates became the first Falcon in school history to score on a fumble recovery, interception return, kickoff return and punt return. Gates and Swan also went over 200 career tackles. Travis Greene's 112 yards put him over 1,000 rushing yards on the season. The Falcons advanced to 4-1 in MAC play and trail just 5-0 Buffalo in the standings, but the teams are set to play in the season finale.

Statistics	Bowling Green	Miami (OH)
First downs	30	16
Plays–yards	447	228
Rushes–yards	41-189	37-97
Passing yards	258	131
Passing: comp–att–int	21-30-1	15-25-0
Time of possession	32:29	27:21

Team	Category	Player	Statistics
Bowling Green	Passing	Matt Johnson	20/26, 252 yards, 3TDS, 1INT
Bowling Green	Rushing	Travis Greene	14 carries, 112 yards
Bowling Green	Receiving	Ryan Burbrink	4 receptions, 51 yards
Miami (OH)	Passing	Drew Kummer	9/19, 100 yards
Miami (OH)	Rushing	Grant Niemiec	5 carries, 40 yards
Miami (OH)	Receiving	Alvonta Jenkins	3 receptions, 52 yards

=== Ohio ===
Ohio Bobcats (6-3) at Bowling Green Falcons (6-3) – Game summary

Quarter	1	2	3	4	Total
Ohio	0	0	0	0	0
Bowling Green	21	14	7	7	49

at Doyt Perry Stadium • Bowling Green, Ohio

- Date: November 12, 2013
- Game time: 7:30 p.m. EDT
- Game weather: Temperature: 30 °F (−1 °C) • Wind: NW 11 MPH • Weather: Cold/Clear
- Game attendance: 8,527
- TV: ESPN3

Game information

First quarter

- 12:55 BGSU Travis Greene 11 yard run (Tyler Tate kick)
- 11:49 BGSU Heath Jackson 32 yard pass from Matt Johnson (Tyler Tate kick)
- 3:51 BGSU William Houston 1 yard run (Tyler Tate kick)

Second quarter

- 12:26 BGSU William Houston 1 yard run (Tyler Tate kick)
- 3:02 BGSU Travis Greene 16 yard run (Tyler Tate kick)

Third quarter

- 12:41 BGSU Alex Bayer 57 yard pass from Matt Johnson (Tyler Tate kick)

Fourth quarter

- 13:04 BGSU Ronnie Moore 24 yard pass from Matt Schilz (Tyler Tate kick)

After a Bobcats three and out, Falcons quarterback Matt Johnson connected with Shaun Joplin for 43 yards. Travis Greene would score the next play from 11 yards out. Ohio's next possession ended with a failed fake punt that resulted for a gain of just two yards on forth and 12. Bowling Green would score on their first play of the drive when Johnson would find Heath Jackson on a 32 yard touchdown. The Falcons led 14-0 with 11:49 remaining in the first quarter. Following another Bobcat three and out, the Falcons would march 72 yards on 11 plays where William Houston would score from one yard out. The Falcons defense would force another Bobcat punt after just three plays and their next drive also resulted in a one yard touchdown from Houston, making the score 28-0. Ohio quarterback Tyler Tettleton would find Donte Foster on a pass play passing mid-field, but linebacker Paul Swan forced a fumbled that was recovered by Ryland Ward. Travis Greene would later score on a 16 yard rushing touchdown, his second of the game.

Johnson threw a 57 yard touchdown pass to Alex Bayer on the Falcons first drive of the second half. One of the Bobcats only chance to score was halted when Tettleton's pass was intercepted by Jerry "Boo Boo" Gates in the red zone. Bowling Green backup quarterback Matt Schilz would throw his first touchdown of the season to Ronnie Moore on a 24 yard strike.

This was Bowling Green's largest win since October 1, 2005 vs Temple. Ohio managed just 172 yards in 62 plays from scrimmage. Cameron Truss led the team with seven tackles. Ward forced a fumble and also recovered one.

Statistics	Ohio	Bowling Green
First downs	9	20
Plays–yards	172	460
Rushes–yards	29-56	41-207
Passing yards	116	253
Passing: comp–att–int	18-33-1	13-20-1
Time of possession	26:23	33:37

Team	Category	Player	Statistics
Ohio	Passing	Tyler Tettleton	15/27, 93 yards, 1INT
Ohio	Rushing	Beau Blankenship	9 carries, 26 yards
Ohio	Receiving	Troy Hill	2 receptions, 28 yards
Bowling Green	Passing	Matt Johnson	12/17, 229 yards, 2TDS, 1INT
Bowling Green	Rushing	Travis Greene	22 carries, 149 yards, 2TDS
Bowling Green	Receiving	Heath Jackson	5 receptions, 74 yards, 1TD

=== At Eastern Michigan ===
Bowling Green Falcons (7-3) at Eastern Michigan Eagles (2-8) – Game summary

Quarter	1	2	3	4	Total
Bowling Green	17	17	17	7	58
Eastern Michigan	7	0	0	0	7

at Rynearson Stadium • Ypsilanti, MI

- Date: November 23, 2013
- Game time: 1:00 p.m. EDT
- Game weather: Temperature: 27 °F (−3 °C) • Wind: NNW 21 MPH • Weather: Cloudy; Snow
- Game attendance: 1,751
- TV announcers (ESPN3): Michael Reghi (play-by-play), Dustin Fox (analyst)

Game information

First quarter

- 10:44 BGSU Tyler Tate 30 yard field goal
- 6:36 EMU Sean Kurtz 10 yard interception return (Dylan Mulder kick)
- 6:10 BGSU Ronnie Moore 74 yard pass from Matt Johnson (Tyler Tate kick)
- 0:07 BGSU Ronnie Moore 22 yard pass from Matt Johnson (Tyler Tate kick)

Second quarter

- 10:39 BGSU Tyler Tate 34 yard field goal
- 5:46 BGSU Travis Greene 28 yard run (Tyler Tate kick)
- 1:34 BGSU Ronnie Moore 34 yard pass from Matt Johnson (Tyler Tate kick)

Third quarter

- 9:41 BGSU Travis Greene 2 yard run (Tyler Tate kick)
- 4:47 BGSU Tyler Tate 29 yard field goal
- 3:21 BGSU Will Watson 37 yard fumble return (Tyler Tate kick)

Fourth quarter

- 5:59 BGSU William Houston 44 yard run (Tyler Tate kick)

The (2-8) Eastern Michigan Eagles were coming off of a thrilling 35-32 (OT) victory over Western Michigan Broncos. Interim coach Stan Parrish made his Eagles debut in the win. Bowling Green Falcons quarterback Matt Johnson came into the game leading the MAC with a 154.1 pass efficiency rating. BG's first drive of the game resulted in a Tyler Tate 30 yard field goal to start the scoring. EMU Freshman quarterback Brogan Roback made his third start of the season on the Eagles senior day. The Eagles first drive of the game resulted in a punt that was downed on the Falcons one yard line. Inside their own 10 yard line, Johnson was intercepted by linebacker Sean Kurtz who scored on a 10 yard interception return. On the second play of the Falcons ensuing drive, Ronnie Moore caught a 74 yard touchdown pass from Johnson. Following an Eagles punt, Moore scored his second touchdown of the game on a 22 yard touchdown pass from Johnson, making the score 17-7. In the second quarter, Tate would connect on a 34 yard field goal to increase the lead to 13. Flacons running back Travis Greene came into the game averaging 116.7 rushing YPG, which ranked fourth in the MAC. Greene scored on a 28 yard touchdown run, making the score 27-7. With under two minutes remaining in the half, the Johnson to Moore connection resulted in their third touchdown of the game on a 34 yard touchdown pass.

In the second half, the Falcons would score 17 points for the third consecutive quarter. The scoring started on a Greene two yard touchdown run. Tate then connected for his career best third field goal of the game coming from 29 yards out. Leading 44-7, Roback was sacked by Izaah Lunsford, who caused a fumbled that was picked up returned by Will Watson for a 37 yard score. In the fourth quarter, running back William Houston ran for a career long 44 yard touchdown making the score 58-7.

The Eagles were only 1-of-18 passing. Defensive backs Ryland Ward and Isaiah Gourdine also had interceptions. The Orange and Brown only allowed 65 yards of total offense and four passing yards. This made it the third straight game the defense had not allowed a touchdown. Bowling Green improved to 8-3 overall and 6-1 in MAC play. The Falcons are now set to play Buffalo for the MAC East Division title.

Statistics	Bowling Green	Eastern Michigan
First downs	24	4
Plays–yards	560	65
Rushes–yards	46-296	26-61
Passing yards	264	4
Passing: comp–att–int	13-26-1	1-18-1
Time of possession	39:23	20:37

Team	Category	Player	Statistics
Bowling Green	Passing	Matt Johnson	13/23, 264 yards, 3TDS, 1INT
Bowling Green	Rushing	Travis Greene	15 carries, 126 yards, 2TDS
Bowling Green	Receiving	Ronnie Moore	7 receptions, 161 yards, 3TDS
Eastern Michigan	Passing	Brogan Roback	1/12, 4 yards, 1INT
Eastern Michigan	Rushing	Ryan Brumfield	9 carries, 29 yards
Eastern Michigan	Receiving	Quincy Jones	1 reception, 4 yards

=== At Buffalo ===
Bowling Green Falcons (8-3) at Buffalo Bulls (8-3) – Game summary

Quarter	1	2	3	4	Total
Bowling Green	3	0	14	7	24
Buffalo	0	7	0	0	7

at Ralph Wilson Stadium • Orchard Park, NY

- Date: November 29, 2013
- Game time: 1:30 p.m. EDT
- Game weather: Temperature: 32 °F (0 °C) • Wind: NE 2 MPH • Weather: Cloudy; Snow
- Game attendance: 26,226
- TV announcers (ESPN3): Eamon McAnaney (play-by-play), Anthony Becht (analyst), Brooke Weisbrod (sideline reporter)

Game information

First quarter

- 4:52 BGSU Tyler Tate 40 yard field goal

Second quarter

- 7:13 BUFF Branden Oliver 2 yard run (Patrick Clarke kick)

Third quarter

- 8:07 BGSU Shaun Joplin 23 yard pass from Matt Johnson (Tyler Tate kick)
- 2:05 BGSU Travis Greene 14 yard run (Tyler Tate kick)

Fourth quarter

- 8:18 BGSU Matt Johnson 7 yard run (Tyler Tate kick)

The Bowling Green Falcons led the head-to-head series 10-2 against the Buffalo Bulls in a matchup that would determine the MAC East Division champion. This was the first meeting at Ralph Wilson Stadium. On the first drive of the game, Buffalo quarterback Joe Licata was sacked by Paul Swan and Paul Senn on third and ten from the BwGrn 46 yard line. Following a punt, the Falcons were at a crucial third and six from the Bulls 45 yard line where running back Jordan Hopgood was stopped short of the yard to gain by defensive end Khalil Mack, which forced a punt. After a Bulls three and out, the Falcons ran a draw to running back Travis Greene who broke free for a 33 yard rush down to the UB 30 yard line. The Falcons would later score on a Tyler Tate 40 yard field goal, giving them a 3-0 lead. The Orange and Brown held the Bulls offense to another punt which was downed on their one yard line. The Falcons were not able to move the ball which resulted in a Brian Schmiedebusch punt. However, Bulls punt returner Devin Campbell fumbled the punt that was recovered by BG long snapper Greg Hohenstein on their own 41 yard line. Looking to capitalize on the turnover, the Falcons were stopped on downs from the Bulls 32 yard line following an incompletion. Buffalo then went on a nine play 66 yard touchdown drive that was ignited by a 30 yard completion to Campbell that was tackled down to the BG five yard line. Three plays later, running back Branden Oliver would score from two yards out on third and goal. The remaining eight minutes of the half resulted in five punts, three of which came from the Falcons.

Trailing 7-3, the Falcons received the second half kick off that was returned by Jerry "Boo Boo" Gates to their 37 yard line. Falcons quarterback Matt Johnson found wide receiver Shaun Joplin on a 31 yard completion down to the UB 19 yard line on third and 10 from midfield. The next play, Johnson's pass was altered at the line by Mack which resulted in an interception by Lee Skinner. The Bulls were faced with a third and 10 from their 28 yard line when defensive lineman Ted Ouellet sacked Licatta for the Falcons third sack of the game. Following a UB punt, Johnson connected with tight end Alex Bayer on a 48 yard completion who caught a contested catch in-between two UB defenders on a third and nine from the BG 31 yard line. Johnson then found Joplin on a third and 12 which resulted for a 23 yard touchdown that was upheld by video review for his third touchdown of the season. The Bulls next drive resulted in just five yards on three plays that caused another punt. The Falcons then went 93 yards on seven plays that was capped off by a Travis Greene 14 yard touchdown run. Johnson also legged out a season long 56 yard rush on the drive. After three consecutive punts, two from UB, Johnson scored a seven yard touchdown making the score 24-7 with 8:18 remaining. The Bulls were unable to score again, giving the Falcons the victory. The Orange and Brown held Buffalo to 15 yards rushing and just 236 total yards of offense. With the win, Bowling Green won the MAC East Division and advanced to the MAC Championship game.

Statistics	Bowling Green	Buffalo
First downs	16	15
Plays–yards	490	236
Rushes–yards	48-260	24-15
Passing yards	230	221
Passing: comp–att–int	11-26-1	21-45-1
Time of possession	34:31	25:49

Team	Category	Player	Statistics
Bowling Green	Passing	Matt Johnson	11/26, 230 yards, 1TD, 1INT
Bowling Green	Rushing	Travis Greene	30 carries, 129 yards, 2TD
Bowling Green	Receiving	Shaun Joplin	6 receptions, 149 yards, 1TD
Buffalo	Passing	Joe Licata	21/45, 221 yards, 1INT
Buffalo	Rushing	Branden Oliver	18 carries, 46 yards, 1TD
Buffalo	Receiving	Alex Neutz	6 receptions, 66 yards

=== Vs. #14 Northern Illinois (MAC Championship Game) ===
2013 MAC Championship Game
Bowling Green Falcons (9–3, 7–1) vs. #14 Northern Illinois Huskies (12–0, 8–0)

Quarter	1	2	3	4	Total
Bowling Green	17	14	0	16	47
Northern Illinois	7	6	7	7	27

at Ford Field • Detroit, MI

- Date: Friday, December 6, 2013
- Game time: 8:00 p.m. EST
- Game weather: N/A (game played indoors)
- Game attendance: 21,106
- TV announcers (ESPN): Danny Kanell, Carter Blackburn and Allison Williams

Game information

First quarter

- (12:27) BGSU – Tyler Beck 28 yard pass from Matt Johnson (Tyler Tate kick) (Drive: 5 plays, 75 yards, 2:33; Bowling Green 7–0)
- (9:08) NIU – Juwan Brescacin 14 yard pass from Jordan Lynch (Mathew Sims kick) (Drive: 11 plays, 73 yards, 2:14; Tied 7–7)
- (6:49) BGSU – Tyler Tate 26 yard field goal (Drive: 5 plays, 67 yards, 2:19; Bowling Green 10–7)
- (2:32) BGSU – Ronnie Moore 36 yard pass from Matt Johnson (Tyler Tate kick) (Drive: 5 plays, 76 yards, 2:35; Bowling Green 17–7)

Second quarter

- (14:51) NIU – Mathew Sims 51 yard field goal (Drive: 9 plays, 48 yards, 2:34; Bowling Green 17–10)
- (11:22) NIU – Mathew Sims 45 yard field goal (Drive: 6 plays, 37 yards, 1:45; Bowling Green 17–13)
- (5:39) BGSU – Heath Jackson 22 yard pass from Matt Johnson (Tyler Tate kick) (Drive: 9 plays, 88 yards, 5:34; Bowling Green 24–13)
- (0:13) BGSU – Alex Bayer 12 yard pass from Matt Johnson (Tyler Tate kick) (Drive: 8 plays, 51 yards, :52; Bowling Green 31–13)

Third quarter

- (12:23)NIU – Jordan Lynch 8 yard run (Mathew Sims kick) (Drive: 7 plays, 64 yards, 2:29; Bowling Green 31–20)

Fourth quarter

- (14:50) BGSU – Tyler Tate 52 yard field goal (Drive: 10 plays, 39 yards, 5:32; Bowling Green 34–20)
- (10:17) BGSU – Travis Greene 6 yard pass from Matt Johnson (Tyler Tate kick blocked) (Drive: 4 plays, 20 yards, 2:41; Bowling Green 40–20)
- (2:44) BGSU – Travis Greene 16 yard run (Tyler Tate kick) (Drive: 10 plays, 59 yards, 5:22; Bowling Green 47–20)
- (0:14) NIU – Jordan Lynch 2 yard run (Mathew Sims kick) (Drive: 11 plays, 79 yards, 2:26; Bowling Green 47–27)

The Bowling Green Falcons went to Ford Field to play the undefeated #14Northern Illinois Huskies. Entering the game, the Huskies were one of just three undefeated teams in the Football Bowl Subdivision. On the opening drive of the game, BG quarterback Matt Johnson connected with tight end Tyler Beck on a 28 yard touchdown. Northern Illinois quarterback Jordan Lynch responded by finding wide receiver Juwan Brescacin on 14 yard touchdown pass. The Falcons would retake the lead on their following drive with a Tyler Tate 26 yard field goal. Following a NIU punt, Johnson found wide receiver Ronnie Moore for a 36 yard touchdown to make the score 17-7. NIU kicker Mathew Sims would make a pair of fields goals from 51 and 45 yards out to make the score 17-13 with 11:22 remaining in the half. Bowling Green extended their lead on a 22 yard touchdown pass to Heath Jackson from Johnson. Following a missed 58 yard field goal attempt from Sims, the Falcons had to punt. With NIU driving at midfield, lineman Ted Ouellet intercepted Lynch's pass off of a deflection. Johnson then found tight end Alex Bayer with just 13 seconds remaining in the half, making the score 31-13 entering the break.

The Huskies would score on their first drive of the second half on an eight yard touchdown run from Lynch. The following Falcons drive resulted in no points when Tate missed a 26 yard field goal attempt wide left. NIU would then settle for a 44 yard field goal attempt their next drive which also sailed wide left from Sims. Tate would extend the Falcons lead to 14 their next possession with a season long 52 yard field goal. With 13 minutes remaining, Lynch was intercepted by Aaron Foster who returned the ball 37 yards to the Huskies 20 yard line. Four plays later, Johnson found running back Travis Greene on a six yard shovel pass for a touchdown. Trailing by 20 points, the Huskies were held on downs at the BwGrn 41 yard line. The Falcons then went on a 10 play 56 yard touchdown drive to seal the game. Greene scored a 16 yard touchdown run to convert a 4th and 13 to give BG a 47-20 lead. Lynch would score a consolation rushing touchdown with 14 seconds remaining. This was Bowling Greens first MAC championship since 1992. The 10 wins on the season was the first double-digit win total since the 2003 season. The 47-27 victory also snapped a three-game losing streak to NIU and first win since 2003. Quarterback Matt Johnson was named Most Valuable Player after throwing for career high 393 yards and 5 touchdowns.

Statistics	Bowling Green	Northern Illinois
First downs	27	29
Plays–yards	574	454
Rushes–yards	40-181-1	42–235-2
Passing yards	393	219
Passing: comp–att–int	21–27–0	21–40–2
Time of possession	34:10	24:58

Team	Category	Player	Statistics
Bowling Green	Passing	Matt Johnson	21/27, 393 yards, 5 TD
Bowling Green	Rushing	Travis Greene	26 carries, 133 yards, 1 TD
Bowling Green	Receiving	Ronnie Moore	4 receptions, 145 yards, 1 TD
Northern Illinois	Passing	Jordan Lynch	21/40, 219 yards, 1 TD
Northern Illinois	Rushing	Jordan Lynch	26 carries, 126 yards, 2 TD
Northern Illinois	Receiving	Juwan Brescacin	6 receptions, 71 yards, 1 TD

=== Vs. Pittsburgh (Little Caesars Pizza Bowl) ===
2013 Little Caesars Pizza Bowl
Pittsburgh Panthers (6–6) vs. Bowling Green Falcons (10-3)

Quarter	1	2	3	4	Total
Pittsburgh	7	10	3	10	30
Bowling Green	3	7	10	7	27

at Ford Field • Detroit, MI

- Date: Friday, December 26, 2013
- Game time: 6:00 p.m. EST
- Game weather: N/A (game played indoors)
- Game attendance: 26,259
- TV announcers (ESPN): Dave LaMont (play-by-play), Ray Bentley (analyst), Niki Noto (sideline reporter)

Game information

First quarter

- (4:26) BGSU – Tyler Tate 28 yard field goal (Drive: 11 plays, 50 yards, 5:49; Bowling Green 3–0)
- (0:58) PITT – James Conner 15 yard run (Chris Blewitt kick) (Drive: 7 plays, 50 yards, 3:28; Pittsburgh 7–3)

Second quarter

- (8:29) PITT – Chris Blewitt 25 yard field goal (Drive: 11 plays, 85 yards, 5:23; Pittsburgh 10–3)
- (6:43) PITT – Tyler Boyd 54 yard punt return (Chris Blewitt kick) (Pittsburgh 17–3)
- (1:28) BGSU – Alex Bayer 29 yard pass from Matt Johnson (Tyler Tate kick) (Drive: 10 plays, 67 yards, 5:15; Pittsburgh 17–10)

Third quarter

- (14:49) BGSU – Jerry "Boo Boo" Gates 94 yard kickoff return (Tyler Tate kick) (Tied 17–17)
- (9:52) BGSU - Tyler Tate 46 yard field goal (Drive: 9 plays, 51 yards, 3:09; Bowling Green 20–17)
- (5:59) PITT - Chris Blewitt 28 yard field goal (Drive: 10 plays, 65 yards, 2:14; Tied 20–20)

Fourth quarter

- (9:31) PITT – Chad Voytik 5 yard run (Chris Blewitt kick) (Drive: 6 plays, 98 yards, 3:26; Pittsburgh 27–20)
- (4:42) BGSU – Ryan Burbrink 15 yard pass from Matt Johnson (Tyler Tate kick) (Drive: 9 plays, 75 yards, 4:49; Tied 27–27)
- (1:17) PITT - Chris Blewitt 39 yard field goal (Drive: 7 plays, 51 yards, 3:25; Pittsburgh 30–27)

The Bowling Green Falcons played the Pittsburgh Panthers in the Little Caesars Pizza Bowl. The game was played at Ford Field with a game attendance of 26,259. Bowling Green interim Head Coach Adam Scheier took over for former Head Coach Dave Clawson after accepting the Head Coaching position at Wake Forest.

After three punts to start the game, the Falcons took the early advantage on a Tyler Tate 28 yard field goal. The Panthers responded with a James Conner 15 yard touchdown run. Following a BG punt, PITT would increase their lead on a Chris Blewitt 25 yard field goal their following drive. Punter returner Tyler Boyd broke the game open when he returned Brian Schmiedebusch's punt 54 yards to increase the Panthers lead to 17-3. Quarterback Matt Johnson led the Falcons on an important 67 yard touchdown drive right before halftime where he connected with tight end Alex Bayer on a 29 yard touchdown pass following a 4th and one. Panthers Quarterback Tom Savage would go down with an injury under a minute remaining in the half where he would not return. He would be replaced by redshirt Freshman Chad Voytik for the remainder of the game.

Jerry "Boo Boo" Gates returned the opening half kickoff for a 94 yard touchdown to tie the game at 17-17. On the Panthers next drive, Conner evaded Flacon defenders for 45 yard gain to the BwGrn 21 yard line. The drive would stall and Blewitt missed a would be go ahead 39 yard field goal wide left. The Falcons would take advantage of the miss when Tate made a 46 yard field goal to take a 20-17 lead midway through the third quarter. Conner recorded 45 rushing yards on five attempts the following drive for the Panthers. Blewitt connected on a 28 yard field goal to make the score 20-20. In the 4th quarter, the Panthers went 98 yards on six plays following a Falcons punt. Boyd had a 68 yard reception that was then capped off by a five yard touchdown run by Voytik. Bowling Green responded with a 15 yard touchdown pass from Johnson to Ryan Burbrink to tie the game at 27-27. With just over three minutes remaining, Conner broke lose at midfield for a 20 yard gain to the BwGrn 30 yard line. Blewitt would make the 39 yard go ahead kick to make the score 30-27 with 1:17 remaining. Following an incompletion and a holding penalty, Panthers defensive lineman Aaron Donald would sack Johnson to nearly end the game. The Falcons attempted multiple laterals on their last play, but were unable to score. Panthers running back James Conner was named Most Valuable Player of the game with 229 rushing yards.

Statistics	Pittsburgh	Bowling Green
First downs	21	18
Plays–yards	487	289
Rushes–yards	39-255-2	34–10-0
Passing yards	232	279
Passing: comp–att–int	23–22–0	21–33–2
Time of possession	28:50	31:10

Team	Category	Player	Statistics
Pittsburgh	Passing	Tom Savage	8/13, 124 yards
Pittsburgh	Rushing	James Conner	26 carries, 229 yards, 1 TD
Pittsburgh	Receiving	Tyler Boyd	8 receptions, 173 yards
Bowling Green	Passing	Matt Johnson	21/40, 219 yards, 1 TD
Bowling Green	Rushing	Travis Greene	18 carries, 39 yards
Bowling Green	Receiving	Shaun Joplin	6 receptions, 86 yards

== Personnel ==
=== Roster ===
2013 Bowling Green Falcons football team roster
Players
Coaches
Offense

Pos.	#	Name	Class
RB	2	Andre Givens	So
QB	3	James Knapke	Fr
RB	4	Jordan Hopgood	Sr
WR	5	Ronnie Moore	Fr
WR	6	Chris Gallon	So
QB	7	Matt Schilz	Sr
WR	9	Shaun Joplin	Sr
WR	10	Herve Coby	So
QB	11	Matt Johnson	So
WR	12	Patrick Brown	Sr
RB	12	Fred Coppet	Fr
RB	13	Travis Greene	So
RB	14	Marcus Levy	Fr
WR	15	Gehrig Dieter	So
QB	16	Austin Valdez	Fr
WR	17	Ryan Burbrink	So
QB	18	Nolan Dieter	So
WR	19	Teo Redding	Fr
WR	20	Eric Harrell	Fr
WR	25	John Klingerman	Fr
RB	32	William Houston	Fr
RB	37	Jamel Martin	Jr
TE/FB	42	Chris Pohlman	Jr
TE	44	Scott Davis	Fr
OL	52	Dominic Flewellyn (C)	Sr
OL	55	Alex Huettel	So
OL	59	Darion Delaney	Jr
OL	62	Spencer Cairo	So
OL	65	David "Chief" Kekuewa (C)	Sr
OL	66	Geno Zappa	Sr
OL	62	Jacob Bennett	Fr
OL	68	Ryan Hunter	Fr
OL	71	Tim McAuliffe	Fr
OL	72	Ben Steward	Fr
OL	74	Christian Piazza	So
OL	75	Clay Rolf	Jr
OL	76	Nick Hager	Jr
OL	77	J.J. Beggan	Fr
OL	78	Clark Clancy	Fr
WR	80	Kevin Collins	Fr
WR	81	Trevor Roop	Fr
TE	82	Alex Bayer (C)	Sr
WR	83	Jared Cohen	Jr
WR	85	Heath Jackson	Jr
TE	86	Logan Larson	Fr
WR	87	Jermal Hosley	So
TE	88	Hunter Folkertsma	Fr
TE	89	Tyler Beck	Sr

Defense

Pos.	#	Name	Class
DB	1	Darrell Hunter II	Jr
DB	3	Brian Sutton	Jr
LB	7	D.J. Lynch	Jr
DB	8	Cameron Truss	Sr
DB	9	Isaiah Gourdine	Fr
DB	11	Gabe Martin (C)	Jr
DB	12	Diontre Delk	So
DB	14	Jude Adjei-Barimah	Jr
DB	15	Ryland Ward	Jr
DB	18	Omar Pierre-Louis	Fr
DB	21	Will Watson	So
DB	22	Josh Pettus	Sr
LB	22	Monti Phillips	Fr
DB	23	Aaron Foster	Sr
DB	24	Jerry "BooBoo" Gates (C)	Sr
LB	27	Nate Locke	Fr
LB	28	Coy Brown III	So
LB	30	Paul Senn	Jr
DB	31	Matt Robinson	Fr
DB	32	Ryan Pitts	Fr
LB	33	Paul Swan (C)	Sr
DB	34	Victor Osborne	Jr
LB	35	James Sanford	Fr
DB	39	Justin Ford	Jr
LB	41	Patric Hannon	Fr
DE	43	Bryan Thomas	Jr
DL	45	Jhalil-Nashid Croley	Fr
DL	46	Charlie Walker	Jr
LB	47	Aaron Banks	Fr
DL	50	Izaah Lunsford	Fr
DL	51	Taylor Royster	So
DL	54	Mike Minns	So
DL	56	Terrell Jackson	Fr
LB	57	Zac Bartman	Fr
LB	58	Tim Love	Jr
DL	60	Darius Holiday	Fr
DL	61	Terrance Bush	Fr
DL	63	Gus Schwietermn	Fr
DL	64	Jonathan Fry	Jr
DL	73	Soloman Carnes	Fr
DL	88	Kendall Montgomery	Jr
DT	90	Jarius Campbell (C)	Sr
DE	92	Zach Colvin	Jr
DT	93	Ted Ouellet	Sr
DL	94	Jason Shepherd	Fr
DL	95	Jake Nachtrab	Fr
DT	96	Ronnie Goble (C)	Sr
DE	99	Bryan Baird	So

Special teams

Pos.	#	Name	Class
LS	48	Greg Hohenstein	Fr
P	49	Joseph Davidson	Fr
K	91	Nick Fields	Fr
P	95	Brian Schmiedebusch	Sr
K	97	Anthony Farinella	So
K	98	Tyler Tate	So

Head coach

- Dave Clawson

Coordinators/assistant coaches

- Warren Ruggiero – Offensive coordinator/quarterbacks
- Mike Elko – Defensive coordinator/safeties
- John Hunter – Running backs/Recruiting
- Adam Scheier – Special teams/TEs
- Mark Carney – Wide receivers
- Bill Durkin – Offensive line
- Nick Monroe – Secondary
- Larry McDaniel – Defensive line
- Rob Neviaser – Linebackers
- Brandon Hourigan – Strength & Conditioning
- Dennis Slutak – Director of Football operations
- Asil Mulbah – Asst. Director of Football operations
- Chris Zuccaro – Video
- Aaron Mershman – Graduate assistant - Defense
- Alex Stadler – Graduate assistant - Offense
- Jahmal Brown – Graduate assistant - Def. Quality Control
- Marcus Edwards – Graduate assistant

Legend

- (C) Team captain
- (S) Suspended
- (I) Ineligible
- Injured
- Redshirt

Roster
Last update: December 7, 2023

== Awards and honors ==
=== Weekly awards ===
Award	Player	Position	Year	Date	Source
MAC East Offensive Player of the Week	William Houston	RB	Fr	Sep. 2	
MAC East Special Teams Player of the Week	Ryan Burbrink	PR	R-So.	Sep. 2	
MAC East Offensive Player of the Week	Matt Johnson	QB	R-So.	Sep. 9	
MAC East Special Teams Player of the Week	Paul Senn	LB	Jr.	Sep. 16	
MAC East Offensive Player of the Week	Matt Johnson	QB	R-So.	Sep. 23	
MAC East Offensive Player of the Week	Travis Greene	RB	R-So.	Sep. 30	
MAC East Offensive Player of the Week	Matt Johnson	QB	R-So.	Oct. 14	
MAC East Defensive Player of the Week	Jerry "Boo Boo" Gates	DB	Sr.	Nov. 11	
MAC East Special Teams Player of the Week	Tyler Tate	K	R-So.	Nov. 11	
MAC East Special Teams Player of the Week	Brian Schmiedebusch	P	R-Sr.	Nov. 18	
MAC East Offensive Player of the Week	Ronnie Moore	WR	Fr.	Nov. 25	
MAC East Offensive Player of the Week	Shaun Joplin	WR	R-Sr.	Dec. 2	

=== Midseason Award watch lists ===
Award	Player	Position	Date
College Football Performance Awards	Ryan Burbrink	PR	Sep. 2
Manning Award	Matt Johnson	QB	Sep. 9
Mackey Award	Alex Bayer	TE	Oct. 15
Ray Guy Award	Brian Schmiedebusch	P	Oct. 25
Burlsworth Trophy	Ryan Burbrink	PR	Nov. 12

=== All-MAC awards ===
2013 Postseason All-MAC teams
Award	Player	Position	Year
All-MAC First Team Offense	David "Chief" Kekuewa	OL	Sr.
All-MAC First Team Offense	Dominic Flewellyn	OL	Sr.
All-MAC First Team Defense	Jerry "Boo Boo" Gates	DB	Sr.
All-MAC Second Team Offense	Alex Huettel	OL	R-So.
All-MAC Second Team Offense	Travis Greene	RB	R-So.
All-MAC Second Team Defense	D.J. Lynch	OLB	R-Jr.
All-MAC Second Team Defense	Gabe Martin	OLB	R-Jr.
All-MAC Second Team Defense	Ted Ouellet	DL	R-Sr.
All-MAC Second Team Specialists	Ryan Burbrink	PR	R-So.
All-MAC Third Team Offense	Alex Bayer	TE	R-Sr.
