= 2010 Bowling Green Falcons football team =

American college football season

2010 Bowling Green Falcons football
- Conference: Mid-American Conference
- East Division
- Record: 2–10 (1–7 MAC)
- Head coach: Dave Clawson
- Offensive coordinator: Warren Ruggiero (2nd season)
- Defensive coordinator: Mike Elko
- Home stadium: Doyt Perry Stadium (Capacity: 23,724)

2010 Mid-American Conference football standings
| | Conf. | | | Overall |
| Team | W | | L | W | | L |
|---|---|---|---|---|---|---|
East Division
| Miami (OH) x$ | 7 | – | 1 | 10 | – | 4 |
| Ohio | 6 | – | 2 | 8 | – | 5 |
| Temple | 5 | – | 3 | 8 | – | 4 |
| Kent State | 4 | – | 4 | 5 | – | 7 |
| Bowling Green | 1 | – | 7 | 2 | – | 10 |
| Buffalo | 1 | – | 7 | 2 | – | 10 |
| Akron | 1 | – | 7 | 1 | – | 11 |
West Division
| Northern Illinois x | 8 | – | 0 | 11 | – | 3 |
| Toledo | 7 | – | 1 | 8 | – | 5 |
| Western Michigan | 5 | – | 3 | 6 | – | 6 |
| Ball State | 3 | – | 5 | 4 | – | 8 |
| Central Michigan | 2 | – | 6 | 3 | – | 9 |
| Eastern Michigan | 2 | – | 6 | 2 | – | 10 |
Championship: Miami 26, Northern Illinois 21
$ – Conference champion; x – Division champion/co-champions

The 2010 Bowling Green Falcons football team was the 92nd varsity football team to represent Bowling Green State University and the program's 58th season in the Mid-American Conference. The Falcons play in the MAC's east division and are led by second year head coach Dave Clawson. They played their home games at Doyt Perry Stadium. They finished the season 2–10, 1–7 in MAC play to finish in a three-way tie for fifth place in the East Division.

== Preseason ==
In early July 2010, Falcon Sports Properties secured a three-year agreement with Toledo's ESPN Radio affiliate WLQR (1470 AM) to carry all Bowling Green Falcons football games, as well as a partial men's basketball schedule. As part of the agreement, WLQR will air daily shows as well as coaches' show for both teams. With the addition of WLQR, the Falcon Sports Network to seven stations across northwest Ohio.

At the 2010 Mid-American Conference Media Day, Bowling Green was picked to finish fourth in the conference's East Division. The Falcons are expected to finish behind Temple, Ohio and Kent State

=== Team departures ===
2010 Bowling Green offseason departures
| Name | Pos. |
|---|---|
| Scott Albert | OL |
| Freddie Barnes | WR |
| Chris Bullock | RB |
| Toby Hunter | QB |
| Brady Minturn | OL |
| Jimmy Scheidler | TE |
| Tyler Sheehan | QB |
| Shane Steffy | OL |
| Chris Wright | WR |
| Cody Basler | LB |
| Jahmal Brown | DB |
| Giovanni Fillari | DB |
| Brandon Jackson | LB |
| P. J. Mahone | DB |
| Jarrett Sanderson | LB |
| James Schneider | LB |
| Roger Williams | DB |
| Nick Iovinelli | P |
| Craig Rutherford | LS |

=== Recruiting class ===
College recruiting information (2010)
| Name | Hometown | School | Height | Weight | 40^{‡} | Commit date |
|---|---|---|---|---|---|---|
| Jamel Martin; RB | Bolingbrook, Illinois | Bolingbrook HS | 6 ft 0 in (1.83 m) | 195 lb (88 kg) | - | Dec 16, 2009 |
| Jamel Martin; RB | Recruit ratings: Scout: Rivals: | | | | | |
| Caleb Watkins; QB | Middletown, Ohio | Middletown HS | 6 ft 3 in (1.91 m) | 205 lb (93 kg) | 4.53 | Jul 3, 2009 |
| Caleb Watkins; QB | Recruit ratings: Scout: Rivals: | | | | | |
| Trent Hurley; QB | Greensburg, Pennsylvania | Central Catholic HS | 6 ft 5 in (1.96 m) | 210 lb (95 kg) | - | Aug 12, 2009 |
| Trent Hurley; QB | Recruit ratings: Scout: Rivals: | | | | | |
| D.J. Lynch; OLB | Auburn Hills, Michigan | Avondale HS | 6 ft 1 in (1.85 m) | 220 lb (100 kg) | 4.62 | Aug 3, 2009 |
| D.J. Lynch; OLB | Recruit ratings: Scout: Rivals: | | | | | |
| Isaiah Byler; T | Elyria, Ohio | Elyria HS | 6 ft 5 in (1.96 m) | 315 lb (143 kg) | 5.2 | Jul 26, 2009 |
| Isaiah Byler; T | Recruit ratings: Scout: Rivals: | | | | | |
| Justin Ford; ATH | Grand Rapids, Michigan | Kenowa Hills HS | 6 ft 2 in (1.88 m) | 198 lb (90 kg) | 4.5 | Jun 25, 2009 |
| Justin Ford; ATH | Recruit ratings: Scout: Rivals: | | | | | |
| Marcus Beaurem; WR | Sterling Heights, Michigan | Adlai Stevenson HS | 5 ft 11 in (1.80 m) | 170 lb (77 kg) | 4.4 | Jun 23, 2009 |
| Marcus Beaurem; WR | Recruit ratings: Scout: Rivals: | | | | | |
| Gabe Martin; OLB | Grand Blanc, Michigan | Grand Blanc Community HS | 6 ft 3 in (1.91 m) | 210 lb (95 kg) | - | Aug 7, 2009 |
| Gabe Martin; OLB | Recruit ratings: Scout: Rivals: | | | | | |
| Darion Delaney; DE | Trotwood, Ohio | Trotwood-Madison HS | 6 ft 5 in (1.96 m) | 260 lb (120 kg) | - | Sep 4, 2009 |
| Darion Delaney; DE | Recruit ratings: Scout: Rivals: | | | | | |
| Cody Silk; G | Warren, Michigan | De La Salle Collegiate HS | 6 ft 4 in (1.93 m) | 275 lb (125 kg) | - | Nov 7, 2009 |
| Cody Silk; G | Recruit ratings: Scout: Rivals: | | | | | |
| Darius Gilbert; DT | Hamilton, Ohio | Hamilton HS | 6 ft 2 in (1.88 m) | 250 lb (110 kg) | - | Sep 28, 2009 |
| Darius Gilbert; DT | Recruit ratings: Scout: Rivals: | | | | | |
| Clay Rolf; T | Pemberville, Ohio | Eastwood HS | 6 ft 7 in (2.01 m) | 250 lb (110 kg) | - | Aug 19, 2009 |
| Clay Rolf; T | Recruit ratings: Scout: Rivals: | | | | | |
| Jude Adjei-Barimah; CB | Columbus, Ohio | Northland HS | 5 ft 10 in (1.78 m) | 177 lb (80 kg) | 4.51 | Aug 15, 2009 |
| Jude Adjei-Barimah; CB | Recruit ratings: Scout: Rivals: | | | | | |
| Heath Jackson; WR | Ada, Ohio | Ada HS | 6 ft 1 in (1.85 m) | 180 lb (82 kg) | 4.58 | Sep 4, 2009 |
| Heath Jackson; WR | Recruit ratings: Scout: Rivals: | | | | | |
| Nick McKnight; WR | Middletown, Ohio | Middletown HS | 6 ft 3 in (1.91 m) | 196 lb (89 kg) | 4.7 | Sep 9, 2009 |
| Nick McKnight; WR | Recruit ratings: Scout: Rivals: | | | | | |
Overall recruit ranking:
‡ Refers to 40-yard dash; Note: In many cases, Scout, Rivals, 247Sports, On3, and ESPN may conflict in their listings of height, weight and 40 time.; In these cases, the average was taken. ESPN grades are on a 100-point scale.; Sources: "Bowling Green Commit List for 2010". Rivals.; "Bowling Green: Commits". Scout.; "Scout.com Team Recruiting Rankings". Scout.; "2010 Team Ranking". Rivals.com.

== Schedule ==
| Date | Time | Opponent | Site | TV | Result | Attendance |
|---|---|---|---|---|---|---|
| September 4 | 7:00 pm | at Troy* | Veterans Memorial Stadium; Troy, AL | | L 27–30 | 19,886 |
| September 11 | 7:00 pm | at Tulsa* | H. A. Chapman Stadium; Tulsa, OK | | L 20–33 | 19,565 |
| September 18 | 7:00 pm | Marshall* | Doyt Perry Stadium; Bowling Green, OH | ESPN3 | W 44–28 | 20,515 |
| September 25 | 12:00 pm | at No. 21 Michigan* | Michigan Stadium; Ann Arbor, MI | ESPN2 | L 21–65 | 109,933 |
| October 2 | 3:30 p.m. | Buffalo | Doyt Perry Stadium; Bowling Green, OH | | L 26–28 | 14,544 |
| October 9 | 2:00 pm | at Ohio | Peden Stadium; Athens, OH | | L 25–49 | 19,855 |
| October 16 | 1:00 pm | at Temple | Lincoln Financial Field; Philadelphia, PA | | L 27–28 | 23,045 |
| October 23 | 3:30 pm | Kent State | Doyt Perry Stadium; Bowling Green, OH (Battle for the Anniversary Award) | | L 6–30 | 14,279 |
| October 30 | 3:30 pm | at Central Michigan | Kelly/Shorts Stadium; Mount Pleasant, MI | | W 17–14 | 17,659 |
| November 10 | 8:00 pm | Miami (OH) | Doyt Perry Stadium; Bowling Green, OH | ESPN2 | L 21–24 | 12,073 |
| November 17 | 8:00 pm | at Toledo | Glass Bowl; Toledo, OH (Peace Pipe Trophy) | ESPN2 | L 14–33 | 22,071 |
| November 26 | 2:00 pm | Western Michigan | Doyt Perry Stadium; Bowling Green, OH | BCSN | L 7–41 | 5,121 |
*Non-conference game; Rankings from AP Poll released prior to the game; All times are in Eastern time

== Game summaries ==
=== At Troy Trojans ===
Bowling Green Falcons (0–0) at Troy Trojans (0–0) – Game summary

| Quarter | 1 | 2 | 3 | 4 | Total |
|---|---|---|---|---|---|
| Falcons | 14 | 3 | 10 | 0 | 27 |
| Trojans | 7 | 10 | 10 | 3 | 30 |

at Veterans Memorial Stadium • Troy, AL

- Date: September 4, 2010
- Game time: 6:00 p.m.
- Game weather: Clear, 83 °F (28 °C), NNW 6 MPH
- Game attendance: 19,886
- Referee: Riley Johnson

Game information

First quarter

- (08:54) BGSU – Willie Geter 35-yard run (Bryan Wright kick) (Drive: 11 plays, 92 yards, 3:23; Bowling Green 7-0)
- (07:06) TROY – Jason Bruce 38-yard pass from Corey Robinson (Michael Taylor kick) (Drive: 7 plays, 74 yards, 1:48; Tied 7-7)
- (01:49) BGSU – Adrian Hodges 3-yard pass from Matt Schilz (Bryan Wright kick) (Drive: 11 plays, 48 yards, 5:17; Bowling Green 14-7)

Second quarter

- (10:23) BGSU – Bryan Wright 19-yard field goal (Drive: 7 plays, 25 yards, 2:37; Bowling Green 17-7)
- (07:39) TROY – Michael Taylor 26-yard field goal (Drive: 9 plays, 42 yards, 2:44; Bowling Green 17-10)
- (01:17) TROY – Shawn Southward 1-yard run (Michael Taylor kick) (Drive: 13 plays, 65 yards, 3:37; Tied 17-17)

Third quarter

- (14:07) BGSU – Eugene Cooper 63-yard punt return (Bryan Wright kick) (Bowling Green 24-17)
- (12:53) TROY – Jerrel Jernigan 49-yard run (Michael Taylor kick) (Drive: 3 plays, 64 yards, 1:15; Tied 24-24)
- (08:45) TROY – Michael Taylor 40-yard field goal (Drive: 8 plays, 24 yards, 2:27; Troy 27-24)
- (02:11) BGSU – Bryan Wright 23-yard field goal (Drive: 7 plays, 35 yards, 3:20; Tied 27-27)

Fourth quarter

- (00:04) TROY – Michael Taylor 34-yard field goal (Drive: 7 plays, 49 yards, 1:03; Troy 30-27)

| Statistics | Bowling Green | Troy |
|---|---|---|
| First downs | 20 | 29 |
| Plays–yards | 68–329 | 84–475 |
| Rushes–yards | 25–108 | 44–211 |
| Passing yards | 221 | 264 |
| Passing: comp–att–int | 22–43–1 | 27–40–2 |
| Turnovers | 3 | 2 |
| Time of possession | 29:51 | 30:09 |

| Team | Category | Player | Statistics |
|---|---|---|---|
| Bowling Green | Passing | Matt Schilz | 22/43, 221 yards, TD, INT |
| Bowling Green | Rushing | Willie Geter | 20 carries, 93 yards, TD |
| Bowling Green | Receiving | Kamar Jorden | 9 receptions, 111 yards |
| Troy | Passing | Corey Robinson | 25/38, 252 yards, TD, 2 INTS |
| Troy | Rushing | Shawn Southward | 13 carries, 70 yards, TD |
| Troy | Receiving | Tebiarus Gill | 6 receptions, 68 yards |

=== At Tulsa Golden Hurricane ===
Bowling Green Falcons (0–1) at Tulsa Golden Hurricane (0–1) – Game summary

| Quarter | 1 | 2 | 3 | 4 | Total |
|---|---|---|---|---|---|
| Falcons | 7 | 7 | 0 | 6 | 20 |
| Golden Hurricane | 10 | 17 | 6 | 0 | 33 |

at Skelly Field at H. A. Chapman Stadium • Tulsa, OK

- Date: September 11, 2010
- Game time: 6:00 p.m.
- Game weather: Sunny, 86 °F (30 °C), NE 10 MPH
- Game attendance: 19,565
- Referee: Watne Winkler

Game information

First quarter

- (10:10) BGSU – Matt Schilz 1-yard run (Bryan Wright kick) (Drive: 11 plays, 44 yards, 4:27; Bowling Green 7-0)
- (05:38) TLSA – Kevin Fitzpatrick 23-yard field goal (Drive: 13 plays, 74 yards, 4:22; Bowling Green 7-3)
- (04:39) TLSA – Charles Clay 42-yard pass from G. J. Kinne (Kevin Fitzpatrick kick) (Drive: 2 plays, 55 yards, :43; Tulsa 10-7)

Second quarter

- (07:39) TLSA – Kevin Fitzpatrick 27-yard field goal (Drive: 10 plays, 58 yards, 2:58; Tulsa 13-7)
- (03:09) TLSA – Alex Singleton 3-yard run (Kevin Fitzpatrick kick) (Drive: 10 plays, 75 yards, 3:43; Tulsa 20-7)
- (01:24) BGSU – Willie Geter 1-yard run (Bryan Wright kick) (Drive: 1 play, 1 yard, :04; Tulsa 20-14)
- (00:32) TLSA – Trae Johnson 25-yard pass from G. J. Kinne (Kevin Fitzpatrick kick) (Drive: 6 plays, 74 yards, :47; Tulsa 27-14)

Third quarter

- (06:25) TLSA – Kevin Fitzpatrick 34-yard field goal (Drive: 10 plays, 31 yards, 3:01; Tulsa 30-14)
- (00:56) TLSA – Kevin Fitzpatrick 46-yard field goal (Drive: 8 plays, 30 yards, 2:08; Tulsa 33-14)

Fourth quarter

- (09:54) BGSU – Matt Schilz 2-yard run (Matt Schilz Two-point pass failed) (Drive: 8 plays, 56 yards, 3:27; Tulsa 33-20)

| Statistics | Bowling Green | Tulsa |
|---|---|---|
| First downs | 18 | 31 |
| Plays–yards | 65–303 | 88–546 |
| Rushes–yards | 25–41 | 40–190 |
| Passing yards | 262 | 356 |
| Passing: comp–att–int | 29–40–3 | 27–48–1 |
| Turnovers | 3 | 2 |
| Time of possession | 28:15 | 31:45 |

| Team | Category | Player | Statistics |
|---|---|---|---|
| Bowling Green | Passing | Matt Schilz | 29/40, 262 yards, 3 INTs |
| Bowling Green | Rushing | Willie Geter | 15 carries, 50 yards, TD |
| Bowling Green | Receiving | Kamar Jorden | 14 receptions, 168 yards |
| Tulsa | Passing | G. J. Kinne | 27/47, 356 yards, 2 TDs, INT |
| Tulsa | Rushing | Alex Singleton | 10 carries, 74 yards, TD |
| Tulsa | Receiving | Damaris Johnson | 7 receptions, 84 yards |

=== vs Marshall Thundering Herd ===
Marshall Thundering Herd (0–2) vs Bowling Green Falcons (0–2) – Game summary

| Quarter | 1 | 2 | 3 | 4 | Total |
|---|---|---|---|---|---|
| Thundering Herd | 0 | 14 | 14 | 0 | 28 |
| Falcons | 14 | 14 | 0 | 16 | 44 |

at Doyt Perry Stadium • Bowling Green, OH

- Date: September 18, 2010
- Game time: 7:00 p.m.
- Game weather: Partly Cloudy, 80 °F (27 °C), W 7 MPH
- Game attendance: 20,515
- Referee: Mike Conlin
- TV announcers (ESPN3): Greg Franke (play-by-play), Tom Cole (analyst) and Kevin Brechmacher (sidelines)

Game information

First quarter

- (11:55) BGSU – Kamar Jorden 5-yard pass from Matt Schilz (Bryan Wright kick) (Drive: 7 plays, 64 yards, 3:05; Bowling Green 7-0)
- (00:00) BGSU – Dwayne Woods 78-yard interception return (Bryan Wright kick) (Bowling Green 14-0)

Second quarter

- (11:35) BGSU – Matt Schilz 1-yard run (Bryan Wright kick) (Drive: 4 plays, 16 yards, 1:37; Bowling Green 21-0)
- (09:29) MRSH – Andre Booker 68-yard run (Tyler Warner kick) (Drive: 4 plays, 78 yards, 2:00; Bowling Green 21-7)
- (10:55) BGSU – Jordan Hopgood 2-yard run (Bryan Wright kick) (Drive: 7 plays, 47 yards, 3:07; Bowling Green 28-7)
- (00:01) MRSH – Antavious Wilson 6-yard pass from Brian Anderson (Tyler Warner kick) (Drive: 10 plays, 60 yards, :54; Bowling Green 28-14)

Third quarter

- (05:32) MRSH – A. J. Graham 1-yard run (Tyler Warner kick) (Drive: 10 plays, 70 yards, 3:00; Bowling Green 28-21)
- (01:01) MRSH – Martin Ward 1-yard run (Tyler Warner kick) (Drive: 1 play, 1 yard, :05; Tied 28-28)

Fourth quarter

- (14:13) BGSU – Bryan Wright 27-yard field goal (Drive: 5 plays, 54 yards, 2:50; Bowling Green 31-28)
- (09:21) BGSU – Tyrone Pronty 31-yard pass from Aaron Pankratz (Team rush failed) (Drive: 3 plays, 33 yards, :45; Bowling Green 37-28)
- (08:37) BGSU – Jerry "BooBoo" Gates 29-yard interception return (Bryan Wright kick) (Bowling Green 44-28)

| Statistics | Marshall | Bowling Green |
|---|---|---|
| First downs | 19 | 21 |
| Plays–yards | 73–376 | 77–393 |
| Rushes–yards | 26–185 | 44–101 |
| Passing yards | 191 | 292 |
| Passing: comp–att–int | 20–47–4 | 24–33–1 |
| Turnovers | 5 | 2 |
| Time of possession | 22:20 | 37:40 |

| Team | Category | Player | Statistics |
|---|---|---|---|
| Marshall | Passing | Brian Anderson | 20/44, 191 yards, TD, 4 INTS |
| Marshall | Rushing | Antavious Wilson | 7 carries, 121 yards, TD |
| Marshall | Receiving | Chuck Walker | 7 receptions, 66 yards |
| Bowling Green | Passing | Matt Schilz | 19/25, 181 yards, TD, |
| Bowling Green | Rushing | Willie Geter | 31 carries, 100 yards |
| Bowling Green | Receiving | Willie Geter | 5 receptions, 86 yards |

=== At Michigan Wolverines ===
Bowling Green Falcons (1–2) at No. 21 Michigan Wolverines (3–0) – Game summary

| Quarter | 1 | 2 | 3 | 4 | Total |
|---|---|---|---|---|---|
| Falcons | 0 | 14 | 7 | 0 | 21 |
| Wolverines | 21 | 7 | 16 | 21 | 65 |

at Michigan Stadium • Ann Arbor, MI

- Date: September 25, 2010
- Game time: 12:00 p.m.
- Game weather: Partly cloudy, 60 °F (16 °C), NW 20 MPH
- Game attendance: 109,933
- Referee: Dennis Lipski
- TV announcers (ESPN2): Bob Wischusen, Brian Griese & Quint Kessenich

Game information

First quarter

- (12:10) MICH – Denard Robinson 2-yard run (Seth Broekhuizen kick) (Drive: 9 plays, 80 yards, 2:50; Michigan 7-0)
- (09:28) MICH – Denard Robinson 47-yard run (Seth Broekhuizen kick) (Drive: 5 plays, 88 yards, 1:32; Michigan 14-0)
- (04:21) MICH – Jeremy Gallon 11-yard pass from Denard Robinson (Seth Broekhuizen kick) (Drive: 5 plays, 91 yards, 1:53; Michigan 21-0)

Second quarter

- (08:53) BGSU – Jordan Hopgood 1-yard run (Bryan Wright kick) (Drive: 13 plays, 64 yards, 6:37; Michigan 21-7)
- (05:07) BGSU – Tyrone Pronty 71-yard pass from Aaron Pankratz (Bryan Wright kick) (Drive: 1 play, 71 yards, :13; Michigan 21-14)
- (00:42) MICH – Michael Shaw 2-yard run (Seth Broekhuizen kick) (Drive: 10 plays, 69 yards, 4:25; Michigan 28-14)

Third quarter

- (13:38) MICH – Team saftey (Bad snap) (Michigan 30-14)
- (09:04) MICH – John McColgan 2-yard pass from Tate Forcier (Seth Broekhuizen kick) (Drive: 10 plays, 51 yards, 4:34; Michigan 37-14)
- (07:21) MICH – Vincent Smith 8-yard run (Seth Broekhuizen kick) (Drive: 2 plays, 37 yards, :31; Michigan 44-14)
- (02:28) BGSU – Jordan Hopgood 1-yard run (Bryan Wright kick) (Drive: 11 plays, 69 yards, 4:53; Michigan 44-21)

Fourth quarter

- (13:27) MICH – Vincent Smith 1-yard run (Seth Broekhuizen kick) (Drive: 9 plays, 62 yards, 4:01; Michigan 51-21)
- (07:52) MICH – Fitzgerald Toussaint 5-yard run (Seth Broekhuizen kick) (Drive: 8 plays, 94 yards, 3:40; Michigan 58-21)
- (03:11) MICH – Devin Gardner 7-yard run (Scott Schrimscher kick) (Drive: 8 plays, 64 yards, 3:48; Michigan 65-21)

| Statistics | Bowling Green | Michigan |
|---|---|---|
| First downs | 12 | 31 |
| Plays–yards | 58–283 | 82–721 |
| Rushes–yards | 27–32 | 56–466 |
| Passing yards | 251 | 255 |
| Passing: comp–att–int | 19–31–2 | 23–26–0 |
| Turnovers | 2 | 2 |
| Time of possession | 26:54 | 33:06 |

| Team | Category | Player | Statistics |
|---|---|---|---|
| Bowling Green | Passing | Aaron Pankratz | 17/28, 231 yards, TD, INT |
| Bowling Green | Rushing | Willie Geter | 12 carries, 33 yards |
| Bowling Green | Receiving | Tyrone Pronty | 3 receptions, 92 yards, TD |
| Michigan | Passing | Tate Forcier | 12/12, 110 yards, TD |
| Michigan | Rushing | Denard Robinson | 5 carries, 129 yards, 2 TDS |
| Michigan | Receiving | Roy Roundtree | 9 receptions, 118 yards |

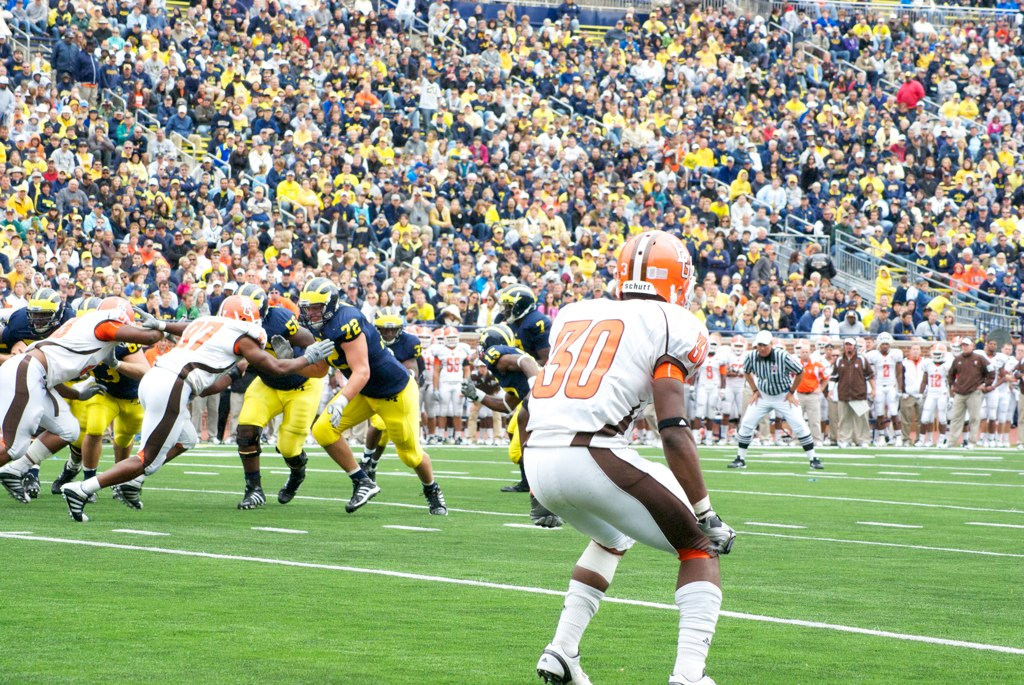
Bowling Green on defense at Michigan

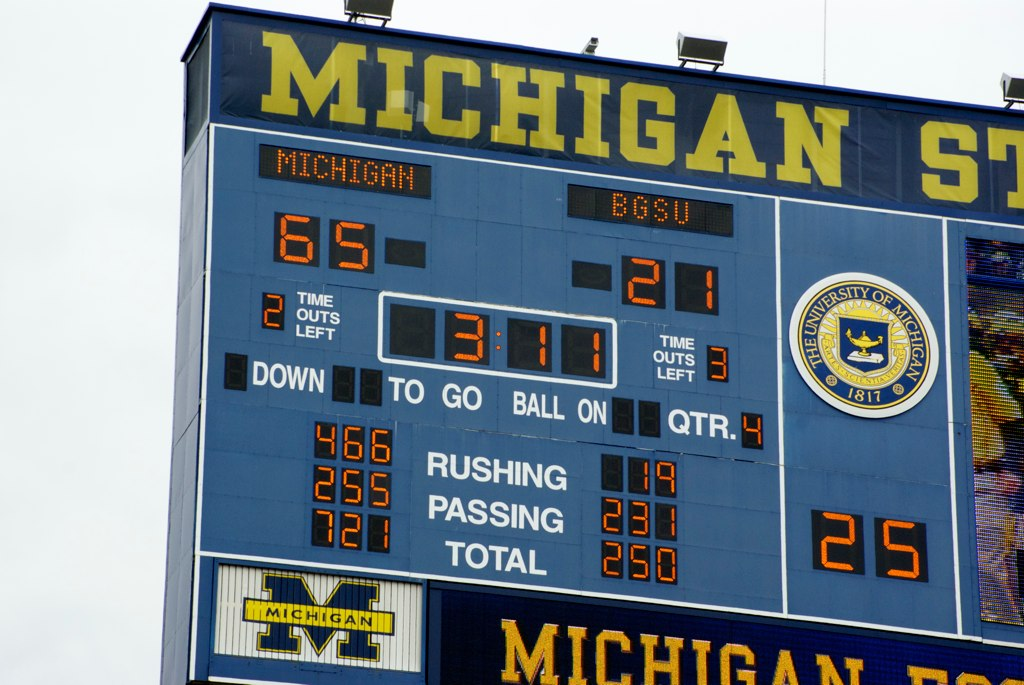
Bowling Green at Michigan

Bowling Green was without starting quarterback Matt Schilz due to a shoulder injury he sustained in the second half the previous week against Marshall. Backup quarterback Aaron Pankratz made his first collegiate start in front of 109,933 fans at "The Big House". Pankratz finished 17-of-28 passing for 231 yards with one touchdown and interception. He threw a 71-yard touchdown to wide receiver Tyrone Pronty on a screen pass to make the score 21–14 midway through the second quarter. Redshirt freshman running back Jordan Hopgood scored a pair of touchdowns for the Falcons, twice converting on fourth-and-goal plays from the 1-yard line for the Falcons other two scores. Bowling Green ended the non-conference portion of the schedule with a record of 1–3.

=== vs Buffalo Bulls ===
Buffalo Bulls (1–3) vs Bowling Green Falcons (1–3) – Game summary

| Quarter | 1 | 2 | 3 | 4 | Total |
|---|---|---|---|---|---|
| Bulls | 0 | 14 | 14 | 0 | 28 |
| Falcons | 6 | 7 | 0 | 13 | 26 |

at Doyt Perry Stadium • Bowling Green, OH

- Date: October 2, 2010
- Game time: 3:30 p.m.
- Game weather: Scattered Rain, 55 °F (13 °C), W 6 MPH
- Game attendance: 14,544
- Referee: A. Cannella

Game information

First quarter

- (06:18) BGSU – Jordan Hopgood 5-yard run (Bryan Wright kick failed) (Drive: 1 play, 5 yards, :05; Bowling Green 6-0)

Second quarter

- (11:41) BUFF – Ike Nduka 1-yard run (A. J. Principe kick) (Drive: 8 plays, 15 yards, 3:20; Buffalo 7-6)
- (03:37) BGSU – Tyrone Pronty 49-yard pass from Aaron Pankratz (Bryan Wright kick) (Drive: 7 plays, 80 yards, 1:46; Bowling Green 13-7)
- (00:22) BUFF – Alex Neutz 24-yard pass from Jerry Davis (A. J. Principe kick) (Drive: 8 plays, 65 yards, 3:08; Buffalo 14-13)

Third quarter

- (11:10) BUFF – Marcus Rivers 7-yard pass from Jerry Davis (A. J. Principe kick) (Drive: 10 plays, 51 yards, 3:45; Buffalo 21-13)
- (05:34) BUFF – Terrell Jackson 9-yard pass from Jerry Davis (A. J. Principe kick) (Drive: 10 plays, 63 yards, 4:33; Buffalo 28-13)

Fourth quarter

- (10:14) BGSU – Robert Lorenzi 82-yard interception return (Aaron Pankratz Two-point pass failed) (Buffalo 28-19)
- (07:12) BGSU – Willie Geter 48-yard pass from Aaron Pankratz (Bryan Wright kick) (Drive: 4 plays, 37 yards, 1:37; Buffalo 28-26)

| Statistics | Buffalo | Bowling Green |
|---|---|---|
| First downs | 27 | 10 |
| Plays–yards | 92–441 | 62–176 |
| Rushes–yards | 58–200 | 25–9 |
| Passing yards | 241 | 167 |
| Passing: comp–att–int | 19–34–1 | 12–37–3 |
| Turnovers | 6 | 5 |
| Time of possession | 38:22 | 21:38 |

| Team | Category | Player | Statistics |
|---|---|---|---|
| Buffalo | Passing | Jerry Davis | 19/34, 241 yards, 3 TD, 4 INTS |
| Buffalo | Rushing | Jeffvon Gill | 13 carries, 52 yards |
| Buffalo | Receiving | Terrell Jackson | 7 receptions, 90 yards, TD |
| Bowling Green | Passing | Aaron Pankratz | 12/37, 167 yards, 2 TDS, 3 INTS |
| Bowling Green | Rushing | Willie Geter | 12 carries, 32 yards |
| Bowling Green | Receiving | Tyrone Pronty | 2 receptions, 63 yards, TD |

=== At Ohio Bobcats ===
Bowling Green Falcons (1–4) at Ohio Bobcats (2–3) – Game summary

| Quarter | 1 | 2 | 3 | 4 | Total |
|---|---|---|---|---|---|
| Falcons | 3 | 0 | 8 | 14 | 25 |
| Bobcats | 14 | 14 | 14 | 7 | 49 |

at Peden Stadium • Athens, OH

- Date: October 9, 2010
- Game time: 2:00 p.m.
- Game weather: Sunny, 77 °F (25 °C), 0 MPH
- Game attendance: 19,855
- Referee: Ron Snodgrass

Game information

First quarter

- (09:22) BGSU – Bryan Wright 22-yard field goal (Drive: 8 plays, 40 yards, 2:40; Bowling Green 3-0)
- (05:54) OHIO – Terrence McCrae 5-yard pass from Boo Jackson (Matt Weller kick) (Drive: 7 plays, 51 yards, 3:18; Ohio 7-3)
- (03:25) OHIO – Vince Davidson 2-yard run (Matt Weller kick) (Drive: 5 plays, 26 yards, 2:15; Ohio 14-3)

Second quarter

- (13:29) OHIO – Jordan Thompson 7-yard pass from Boo Jackson (Matt Weller kick) (Drive: 7 plays, 80 yards, 3:51; Ohio 21-3)
- (00:11) OHIO – Jordan Thompson 6-yard pass from Boo Jackson (Matt Weller kick) (Drive: 8 plays, 57 yards, 2:21; Ohio 28-3)

Third quarter

- (12:45) OHIO – Donovan Fletcher 55-yard interception return (Matt Weller kick) (Ohio 35-3)
- (01:48) BGSU – Willie Geter 1-yard run (Tyrone Pronty Two-point pass) (Drive: 19 plays, 93 yards, 10:45; Ohio 35-11)
- (00:23) OHIO – Phil Bates 62-yard run (Matt Weller kick) (Drive: 3 plays, 76 yards, 1:19; Ohio 42-11)

Fourth quarter

- (12:20) BGSU – Kamar Jorden 10-yard pass from Matt Schilz (Bart Tanski Two-point rush failed) (Drive: 9 plays, 74 yards, 2:58; Ohio 42-17)
- (06:59) OHIO – Phil Bates 12-yard run (Matt Weller kick) (Drive: 1 play, 12 yards, :05; Ohio 49-17)
- (04:30) BGSU – Kamar Jorden 59-yard pass from Matt Schilz (Justus Jones Two-point pass) (Drive: 6 plays, 85 yards, 2:20; Ohio 49-25)

| Statistics | Bowling Green | Ohio |
|---|---|---|
| First downs | 23 | 18 |
| Plays–yards | 74–414 | 52–380 |
| Rushes–yards | 37–137 | 36–257 |
| Passing yards | 277 | 123 |
| Passing: comp–att–int | 23–37–1 | 10–16–0 |
| Turnovers | 2 | 1 |
| Time of possession | 34:22 | 25:38 |

| Team | Category | Player | Statistics |
|---|---|---|---|
| Bowling Green | Passing | Matt Schilz | 23/37, 277 yards, 2 TDS, INT |
| Bowling Green | Rushing | Willie Geter | 22 carries, 98 yards, TD |
| Bowling Green | Receiving | Kamar Jorden | 8 receptions, 129 yards, 2 TDS |
| Ohio | Passing | Boo Jackson | 9/14, 76 yards, 3 TDS |
| Ohio | Rushing | Phil Bates | 11 carries, 142 yards, 2 TDS |
| Ohio | Receiving | Donte Foster | 1 reception, 47 yards |

=== At Temple Owls ===
Bowling Green Falcons (1–5) at Temple Owls (4–2) – Game summary

| Quarter | 1 | 2 | 3 | 4 | Total |
|---|---|---|---|---|---|
| Falcons | 6 | 0 | 8 | 13 | 27 |
| Owls | 0 | 14 | 14 | 0 | 28 |

at Lincoln Financial Field • Philadelphia, PA

- Date: October 16, 2010
- Game time: 1:00 p.m.
- Game weather: Partly Sunny, 59 °F (15 °C), WNW 25 MPH
- Game attendance: 23,045
- Referee: Shawn Smith

Game information

First quarter

- (05:58) BGSU – Jovan Leacock 49-yard interception return (Bryan Wright kick blocked) (Bowling Green 6-0)

Second quarter

- (14:33) TEM – Rod Streater 80-yard pass from Mike Gerardi (Brandon McManus kick) (Drive: 1 play, 80 yards, :11; Temple 7-6)
- (11:23) TEM – Evan Rodriguez 46-yard pass from Mike Gerardi (Brandon McManus kick) (Drive: 3 plays, 72 yards, 1:23; Temple 14-6)

Third quarter

- (10:01) BGSU – Willie Geter 12-yard run (Kamar Jorden Two-point pass) (Drive: 7 plays, 66 yards, 3:45; Tied 14-14)
- (05:46) TEM – Quinten White 0-yard fumble recovery (Brandon McManus kick) (Temple 21-14)
- (00:03) TEM – Bernard Pierce 6-yard run (Brandon McManus kick) (Drive: 8 plays, 71 yards, 4:07; Temple 28-14)

Fourth quarter

- (06:04) BGSU – Jordan Hopgood 1-yard run (Bryan Wright kick) (Drive: 16 plays, 80 yards, 8:59; Temple 28-21)
- (00:00) BGSU – Calvin Wiley 4-yard pass from Matt Schilz (Matt Schilz Two-point pass failed) (Drive: 13 plays, 69 yards, 1:47; Temple 28-27)

| Statistics | Bowling Green | Temple |
|---|---|---|
| First downs | 24 | 12 |
| Plays–yards | 88–323 | 45–307 |
| Rushes–yards | 36–36 | 27–133 |
| Passing yards | 287 | 174 |
| Passing: comp–att–int | 30–52–0 | 10–18–1 |
| Turnovers | 1 | 2 |
| Time of possession | 37:18 | 22:42 |

| Team | Category | Player | Statistics |
|---|---|---|---|
| Bowling Green | Passing | Matt Schilz | 30/51, 287 yards, TD |
| Bowling Green | Rushing | Willie Geter | 16 carries, 61 yards, TD |
| Bowling Green | Receiving | Kamar Jorden | 12 receptions, 143 yards |
| Temple | Passing | Mike Gerardi | 9/15, 163 yards, 2 TDS |
| Temple | Rushing | Bernard Pierce | 15 carries, 106 yards, TD |
| Temple | Receiving | Rod Streater | 4 reception, 88 yards, TD |

=== vs Kent State Golden Flashes ===
Kent State Golden Flashes (2–4) vs Bowling Green Falcons (1–6) – Game summary

| Quarter | 1 | 2 | 3 | 4 | Total |
|---|---|---|---|---|---|
| Golden Flashes | 10 | 17 | 3 | 0 | 30 |
| Falcons | 6 | 0 | 0 | 0 | 6 |

at Doyt Perry Stadium • Bowling Green, OH

- Date: October 23, 2010
- Game time: 3:30 p.m.
- Game weather: Cloudy, 69 °F (21 °C), SW 10 MPH
- Game attendance: 14,279
- Referee: Tom McCabe

Game information

First quarter

- (08:20) KENT – Freddy Cortez 29-yard field goal (Drive: 4 plays, 3 yards, 1:26; Kent State 3-0)
- (08:06) BGSU – Jerry "BooBoo" Gates 75-yard kickoff return (Kyle Burkhardt kick blocked) (Bowling Green 6-3)
- (03:21) KENT – Spencer Keith 1-yard run (Freddy Cortez kick) (Drive: 3 plays, 40 yards, 1:12; Kent State 10-6)

Second quarter

- (09:13) KENT – Tyshon Goode 3-yard pass from Spencer Keith (Freddy Cortez kick) (Drive: 5 plays, 24 yards, 1:47; Kent State 17-6)
- (02:27) KENT – Freddy Cortez 32-yard field goal (Drive: 8 plays, 42 yards, 3:54; Kent State 20-6)
- (01:33) KENT – Tyshon Goode 28-yard pass from Spencer Keith (Freddy Cortez kick) (Drive: 2 plays, 39 yards, :18; Kent State 27-6)

Third quarter

- (09:55) KENT – Freddy Cortez 30-yard field goal (Drive: 7 plays, 25 yards, 3:40; Kent State 30-6)

Fourth quarter

- No scoring plays.

| Statistics | Kent State | Bowling Green |
|---|---|---|
| First downs | 19 | 11 |
| Plays–yards | 70–351 | 63–135 |
| Rushes–yards | 38–128 | 24– -10 |
| Passing yards | 223 | 145 |
| Passing: comp–att–int | 26–32–0 | 20–39–2 |
| Turnovers | 2 | 3 |
| Time of possession | 34:59 | 25:01 |

| Team | Category | Player | Statistics |
|---|---|---|---|
| Kent State | Passing | Spencer Keith | 26/32, 223 yards, 2 TDS |
| Kent State | Rushing | Jacquise Terry | 22 carries, 94 yards |
| Kent State | Receiving | Tyshon Goode | 12 receptions, 158 yards, 2 TDS |
| Bowling Green | Passing | Matt Schilz | 18/35, 118 yards, 2 INTS |
| Bowling Green | Rushing | Calvin Wiley | 2 carries, 22 yards |
| Bowling Green | Receiving | Alex Bayer | 3 receptions, 38 yards |

=== At Central Michigan Chippewas ===
Bowling Green Falcons (1–7) at Central Michigan Chippewas (2–6) – Game summary

| Quarter | 1 | 2 | 3 | 4 | Total |
|---|---|---|---|---|---|
| Falcons | 7 | 3 | 0 | 7 | 17 |
| Chippewas | 0 | 0 | 7 | 7 | 14 |

at Kelly/Shorts Stadium • Mount Pleasant, MI

- Date: October 30, 2010
- Game time: 3:30 p.m.
- Game weather: Sunny, breezy 55 °F (13 °C), W 10-15 MPH
- Game attendance: 23,045
- Referee: William Alge

Game information

First quarter

- (11:40) BGSU – Calvin Wiley 10-yard run (Kyle Burkhardt kick) (Drive: 5 plays, 53 yards, 2:31; Bowling Green 7-0)

Second quarter

- (06:07) BGSU – Kyle Burkhardt 34-yard kick (Drive: 15 plays, 60 yards, 7:10; Bowling Green 10-0)

Third quarter

- (07:51) CMU – Jerry Harris 18-yard pass from Ryan Radcliff (David Harman kick) (Drive: 9 plays, 72 yards, 3:58; Bowling Green 10-7)

Fourth quarter

- (14:38) CMU – Avery Cunningham 63-yard interception return (David Harman kick) (Central Michigan 14-10)
- (00:21) BGSU – Jordan Hopgood 1-yard run (Kyle Burkhardt kick) (Drive: 7 plays, 59 yards, 2:05; Bowling Green 17-14)

| Statistics | Bowling Green | Central Michigan |
|---|---|---|
| First downs | 20 | 17 |
| Plays–yards | 72–307 | 59–231 |
| Rushes–yards | 33–107 | 34–99 |
| Passing yards | 200 | 132 |
| Passing: comp–att–int | 22–39–2 | 14–25–1 |
| Turnovers | 2 | 3 |
| Time of possession | 31:30 | 28:30 |

| Team | Category | Player | Statistics |
|---|---|---|---|
| Bowling Green | Passing | Matt Schilz | 22/39, 200 yards, 2 INTS |
| Bowling Green | Rushing | Willie Geter | 26 carries, 103 yards |
| Bowling Green | Receiving | Kamar Jorden | 9 receptions, 92 yards |
| Central Michigan | Passing | Ryan Radcliff | 9/15, 163 yards, 2 TDS |
| Central Michigan | Rushing | Paris Cotton | 23 carries, 111 yards |
| Central Michigan | Receiving | Cedric Fraser | 2 reception, 29 yards |

=== vs Miami RedHawks ===
Miami RedHawks (5–4) vs Bowling Green Falcons (2–7) – Game summary

| Quarter | 1 | 2 | 3 | 4 | Total |
|---|---|---|---|---|---|
| RedHawks | 7 | 7 | 7 | 3 | 24 |
| Falcons | 0 | 7 | 0 | 14 | 21 |

at Doyt Perry Stadium • Bowling Green, OH

- Date: November 10, 2010
- Game time: 8:00 p.m.
- Game weather: Clear, 45 °F (7 °C), ENE 10 MPH
- Game attendance: 12,073
- Referee: Stan Evans
- TV announcers (ESPN2): Mark Neely (play-by-play) and J. C. Pearson (analyst)

Game information

First quarter

- (04:48) MIAMI – Thomas Merriweather 18-yard run (Trevor Cook kick) (Drive: 2 plays, 59 yards, :37; Miami 7-0)

Second quarter

- (08:28) BGSU – Alex Bayer 12-yard pass from Matt Schilz (Kyle Burkhardt kick) (Drive: 11 plays, 79 yards, 5:43; Tied 7-7)
- (01:47) MIAMI – Zac Dysert 1-yard run (Trevor Cook kick) (Drive: 4 plays, 15 yards, 1:50; Miami 14-7)

Third quarter

- (02:40) MIAMI – Nick Harwell 22-yard pass from Zac Dysert (Trevor Cook kick) (Drive: 10 plays, 66 yards, 5:17; Miami 21-7)

Fourth quarter

- (13:27) BGSU – Willie Geter 1-yard run (Kyle Burkhardt kick) (Drive: 5 plays, 76 yards, 1:27; Miami 21-14)
- (06:59) BGSU – Willie Geter 2-yard run (Kyle Burkhardt kick) (Drive: 8 plays, 34 yards, 3:42; Tied 21-21)
- (00:00) MIAMI – Trevor Cook 33-yard field goal (Drive: 7 plays, 21 yards, 2:03; Miami 24-21)

| Statistics | Miami | Bowling Green |
|---|---|---|
| First downs | 20 | 11 |
| Plays–yards | 62–377 | 56–220 |
| Rushes–yards | 37–156 | 27–44 |
| Passing yards | 221 | 176 |
| Passing: comp–att–int | 19–25–0 | 17–29–2 |
| Turnovers | 3 | 3 |
| Time of possession | 33:10 | 26:50 |

| Team | Category | Player | Statistics |
|---|---|---|---|
| Miami | Passing | Zac Dysert | 19/25, 221 yards, TD |
| Miami | Rushing | Thomas Merriweather | 17 carries, 88 yards, TD |
| Miami | Receiving | Nick Harwell | 10 receptions, 125 yards, TD |
| Bowling Green | Passing | Matt Schilz | 17/29, 176 yards, TD, 2 INTS |
| Bowling Green | Rushing | Willie Geter | 16 carries, 34 yards, 2 TDS |
| Bowling Green | Receiving | Kamar Jorden | 4 receptions, 95 yards |

=== At Toledo Rockets ===
Bowling Green Falcons (2–8) at Toledo Rockets (6–3) – Game summary

| Quarter | 1 | 2 | 3 | 4 | Total |
|---|---|---|---|---|---|
| Falcons | 0 | 7 | 7 | 0 | 14 |
| Rockets | 19 | 7 | 7 | 0 | 33 |

at Glass Bowl • Toledo, OH

- Date: November 17, 2010
- Game time: 8:00 p.m.
- Game weather: Partly cloudy, 41 °F (5 °C), SSW 5 MPH
- Game attendance: 22,071
- Referee: Ron Snodgrass
- TV announcers (ESPN2): Dave Neal (play-by-play) and Andre Ware (analyst)

Game information

First quarter

- (11:05) TOL – Eric Page 48-yard pass from Terrance Owens (Bill Claus kick blocked) (Drive: 8 plays, 80 yards, 3:55; Toledo 6-0)
- (08:58) TOL – Kenny Stafford 33-yard pass from Terrance Owens (Two-point pass failed) (Drive: 3 plays, 43 yards, 1:20; Toledo 12-0)
- (07:14) TOL – Tim Cortazzo 35-yard pass from Eric Page (Bill Claus kick) (Drive: 4 plays, 81 yards, 1:12; Toledo 19-0)

Second quarter

- (11:20) BGSU – Calvin Wiley 13-yard pass from Matt Schilz (Kyle Burkhardt kick) (Drive: 3 plays, 13 yards, 1:32; Toledo 19-7)
- (11:01) TOL – Adonis Thomas 81-yard run (Bill Claus kick) (Drive: 1 play, 81 yards, :14; Toledo 26-7)

Third quarter

- (04:21) BGSU – Eugene Cooper 71-yard punt return (Kyle Burkhardt kick) (Toledo 26-14)
- (11:01) TOL – Bernard Reedy 9-yard run (Bill Claus kick) (Drive: 4 plays, 27 yards, 1:39; Toledo 33-14)

Fourth quarter

- No scoring plays.

| Statistics | Bowling Green | Toledo |
|---|---|---|
| First downs | 17 | 23 |
| Plays–yards | 70–254 | 73–537 |
| Rushes–yards | 23–35 | 47–277 |
| Passing yards | 219 | 260 |
| Passing: comp–att–int | 30–47–2 | 17–26–1 |
| Turnovers | 4 | 1 |
| Time of possession | 23:27 | 36:33 |

| Team | Category | Player | Statistics |
|---|---|---|---|
| Bowling Green | Passing | Matt Schilz | 29/47, 219 yards, TD, 2 INTS |
| Bowling Green | Rushing | Willie Geter | 11 carries, 31 yards |
| Bowling Green | Receiving | Kamar Jorden | 8 receptions, 75 yards |
| Toledo | Passing | Terrance Owens | 16/25, 225 yards, 2 TDS, INT |
| Toledo | Rushing | Adonis Thomas | 24 carries, 163 yards, TD |
| Toledo | Receiving | Eric Page | 9 receptions, 111 yards, TD |

=== vs Western Michigan Broncos ===
Western Michigan Broncos (5–6) vs Bowling Green Falcons (2–9) – Game summary

| Quarter | 1 | 2 | 3 | 4 | Total |
|---|---|---|---|---|---|
| Broncos | 13 | 14 | 14 | 0 | 41 |
| Falcons | 0 | 0 | 7 | 0 | 7 |

at Doyt Perry Stadium • Bowling Green, OH

- Date: November 26, 2010
- Game time: 2:00 p.m.
- Game weather: Sunny/Windy, 31 °F (−1 °C), SW 21 MPH
- Game attendance: 5,121
- Referee: Mike Conlin
- TV: ESPN3

Game information

First quarter

- (11:42) WMU – John Potter 42-yard field goal (Drive: 8 plays, 39 yards, 2:34; Western Michigan 3-0)
- (06:29) WMU – Blake Hammond 4-yard pass from Alex Carder (John Potter kick) (Drive: 8 plays, 50 yards, 3:08; Western Michigan 10-0)
- (00:21) WMU – John Potter 25-yard field goal (Drive: 9 plays, 48 yards, 3:54; Western Michigan 13-0)

Second quarter

- (10:55) WMU – Dareyon Chance 4-yard pass from Alex Carder (John Potter kick) (Drive: 7 plays, 65 yards, 3:15; Western Michigan 20-0)
- (10:06) WMU – Dallas Walker 7-yard pass from Alex Carder (John Potter kick) (Drive: 3 plays, 13 yards, :43; Western Michigan 27-0)

Third quarter

- (11:31) BGSU – Kamar Jorden 19-yard pass from Matt Schilz (Bryan Wright kick) (Drive: 4 plays, 72 yards, 1:50; Western Michigan 27-7)
- (09:53) WMU – Tevin Drake 35-yard (John Potter kick) (Drive: 5 plays, 65 yards, 1:32; Western Michigan 34-7)
- (00:42) WMU – Juan Nunez 34-yard pass from Alex Carder (Drive: 4 plays, 96 yards, 1:05; Western Michigan 41-7)

Fourth quarter

- No scoring plays.

| Statistics | Western Michigan | Bowling Green |
|---|---|---|
| First downs | 21 | 22 |
| Plays–yards | 67–442 | 67–396 |
| Rushes–yards | 31–191 | 35–114 |
| Passing yards | 251 | 282 |
| Passing: comp–att–int | 23–36–0 | 19–32–1 |
| Turnovers | 0 | 2 |
| Time of possession | 26:40 | 33:20 |

| Team | Category | Player | Statistics |
|---|---|---|---|
| Western Michigan | Passing | Alex Carder | 23/33, 251 yards, 4 TDS |
| Western Michigan | Rushing | Tevin Drake | 10 carries, 127 yards, TD |
| Western Michigan | Receiving | Jordan White | 7 receptions, 110 yards |
| Bowling Green | Passing | Matt Schilz | 19/31, 282 yards, TD, INT |
| Bowling Green | Rushing | Willie Geter | 15 carries, 87 yards |
| Bowling Green | Receiving | Kamar Jorden | 8 receptions, 114 yards, TD |

== Statistics ==
Final Statistics through November 26, 2010

=== Individual Leaders ===
==== Passing ====
Passing statistics (Note: WR Calvin Willey completed his only attempt for 16 yards)
| NAME | GP | GS | Record | Cmp | Att | Pct | Yds | TD | Int | Rtg |
|---|---|---|---|---|---|---|---|---|---|---|
| Matt Schilz | 10 | 10 | 2–8 | 229 | 377 | 60.7 | 2,223 | 8 | 14 | 109.8 |
| Aaron Pankratz | 6 | 2 | 0–2 | 35 | 77 | 45.5 | 520 | 4 | 5 | 106.3 |
| Kallen Pagel | 1 | 0 | 0–0 | 2 | 3 | 66.7 | 20 | 0 | 1 | 56.0 |
| Totals | 12 | 12 | 2–10 | 266 | 459 | 58.0 | 2,779 | 12 | 20 | 108.7 |

==== Rushing ====
Rushing statistics
| NAME | GP | Att | Yds | Avg | Lng | TD |
|---|---|---|---|---|---|---|
| Willie Geter | 12 | 197 | 718 | 3.6 | 35 | 6 |
| Jordan Hopgood | 12 | 76 | 167 | 2.2 | 17 | 6 |
| Matt Schilz | 10 | 50 | -143 | -2.9 | 8 | 3 |
| Calvin Wiley | 12 | 11 | 62 | 5.6 | 25 | 1 |
| Aaron Pankratz | 6 | 10 | -22 | -2.2 | 7 | 0 |
| Erique Geiger | 2 | 5 | 5 | 1.0 | 7 | 0 |
| Tyrone Pronty | 12 | 3 | 17 | 5.7 | 15 | 0 |
| Eugene Cooper | 11 | 3 | 9 | 3.0 | 5 | 0 |
| John Pettigrew | 8 | 1 | 5 | 5.0 | 5 | 0 |
| Bryan Wright | 12 | 1 | -30 | -30.0 | -30 | 0 |
| Totals | 12 | 361 | 754 | 2.1 | 35 | 16 |

==== Receiving ====
Receiving statistics
| NAME | GP | Rec | Yds | Avg | Lng | TD |
|---|---|---|---|---|---|---|
| Kamar Jorden | 12 | 96 | 1,109 | 11.6 | 76 | 4 |
| Tyrone Pronty | 12 | 35 | 502 | 14.3 | 71 | 3 |
| Willie Geter | 12 | 31 | 236 | 7.6 | 48 | 1 |
| Calvin Wiley | 12 | 25 | 201 | 8.0 | 33 | 2 |
| Alex Bayer | 12 | 22 | 298 | 13.5 | 37 | 1 |
| Adrian Hodges | 11 | 20 | 156 | 7.8 | 19 | 1 |
| Eugene Cooper | 11 | 17 | 130 | 7.6 | 23 | 0 |
| Jordan Hopgood | 12 | 10 | 60 | 6.0 | 23 | 0 |
| Nick Rieke | 12 | 6 | 37 | 6.2 | 17 | 0 |
| Ray Hutson | 12 | 2 | 25 | 12.5 | 14 | 0 |
| Tyler Beck | 11 | 2 | 14 | 7.0 | 8 | 0 |
| Shaun Joplin | 2 | 1 | 11 | 11.0 | 11 | 0 |
| Totals | 12 | 266 | 2,779 | 10.4 | 76 | 12 |

== Awards and honors ==
=== Weekly awards ===
| Award | Player | Position | Year | Date | Source |
|---|---|---|---|---|---|
| MAC East Defensive Player of the Week | Keith Morgan | DB | Jr. | Sept. 6 | |
| MAC East Defensive Player of the Week | Dwayne Woods | LB | So. | Sept. 20 | |
| MAC East Defensive Player of the Week | Chris Jones | DT | So. | Nov. 1 | |
| MAC East Defensive Player of the Week | Dwayne Woods | LB | So. | Nov. 15 | |
| MAC East Special Teams Player of the Week | Eugene Cooper | PR | Jr. | Nov. 22 | |

=== All-MAC awards ===
Postseason All-MAC teams
| Award | Player | Position | Year |
|---|---|---|---|
| All-MAC First Team Offense | Kamar Jorden | WR | Jr. |
| All-MAC Second Team Defense | Dwayne Woods | LB | So. |
| All-MAC Second Team Specialist | Eugene Cooper | PR | Jr. |
| All-MAC Second Team Specialist | Bryan Wright | P | GS |
| All-MAC Third Team Offense | Willie Jeter | RB | GS |
| All-MAC Third Team Defense | Chris Jones | DT | So. |

=== National awards ===
National Award Honors
| Honors | Player | Position | Ref. |
|---|---|---|---|
| CFPA National Punter Returner of the Week | Eugene Cooper | PR | |
| CFPA National Defensive Lineman of the Week | Chris Jones | DT | |
