= Alex Bayer =

American football player and coach (born 1990)

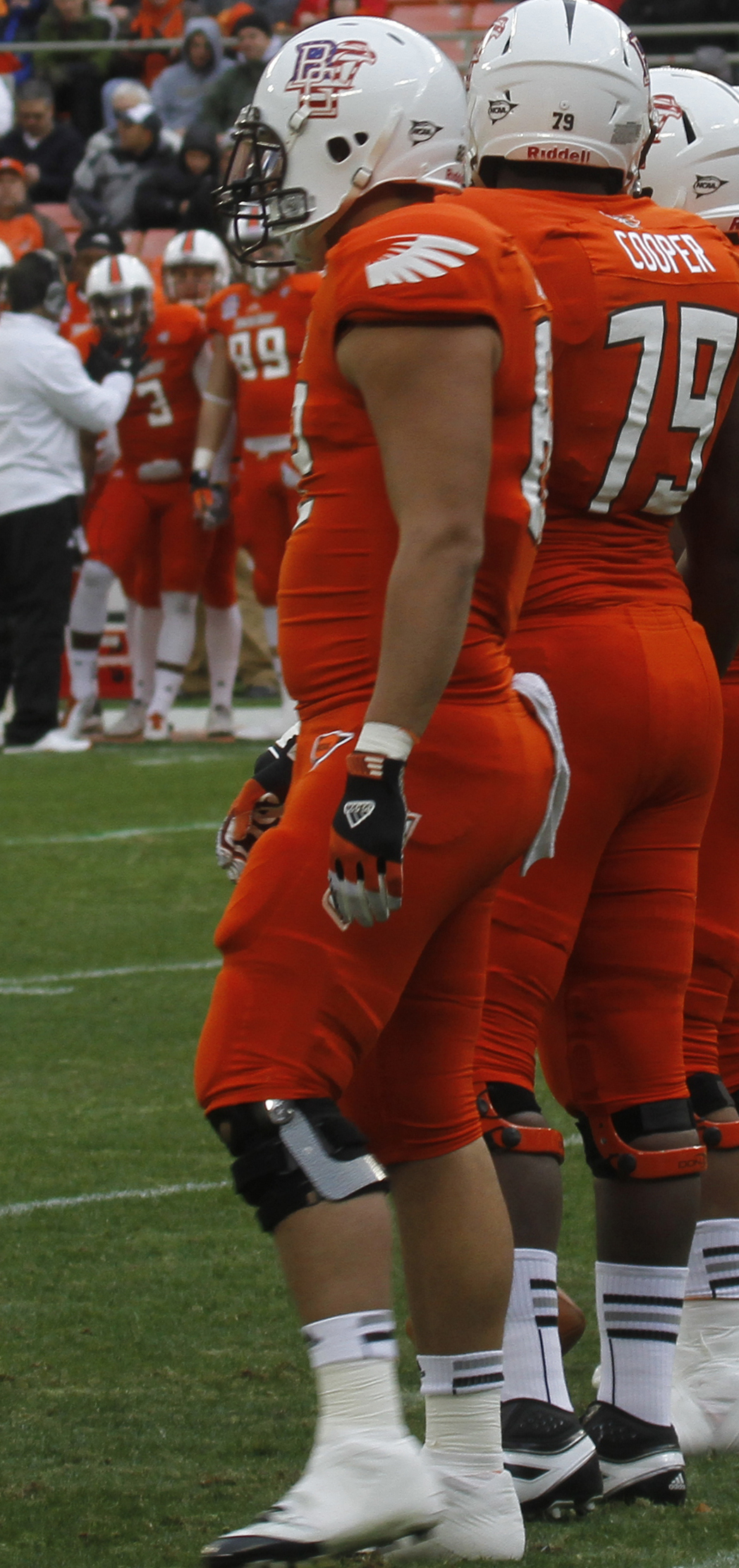
- Bayer with Bowling Green in 2012

Syracuse Orange
- Title: Special teams coordinator

Personal information
- Born: November 8, 1990 (age 35); Pickerington, Ohio
- Listed height: 6 ft 4 in (1.93 m)
- Listed weight: 275 lb (125 kg)

Career information
- High school: Pickerington North (Pickerington, Ohio)
- College: Bowling Green (2009–2013)
- NFL draft: 2014: undrafted

Career history

Playing
- St. Louis Rams (2014); San Diego Chargers (2015)*
- * Offseason or practice squad member only

Coaching
- Otterbein (GA) (2017–2018); Wake Forest (STA) (2019–2020); Valparaiso (STC) (2021); Bowling Green (STC) (2022–2025); Syracuse (STC) (2026–present)

Awards and highlights
- 2× Third-team All-MAC (2012, 2013)

Career NFL statistics
- Games played: 6
- Fumble recoveries: 1
- Stats at Pro Football Reference

Alex Ronald Bayer (born November 8, 1990) is an American football coach and former tight end. He is currently the special teams coordinator at Syracuse University. He was signed by the Rams as an undrafted free agent in 2014. He played college football for the Bowling Green Falcons.

== Early life ==
Bayer had six school records at Pickerington High School North, including 50 receptions for 625 yards and two touchdowns his senior season, where he earned honorable mention all-state and also earned first-team All-OCC and first-team all-central district. Ohio Magazine ranked him the 60th ranked recruit and third-best tight end from the state of Ohio, while ESPN.com ranked him as one of the top-75 tight ends in the nation.

== College career ==
Bayer played in all 12 games, making four starts, during his redshirt freshman season. He was named to Phil Steele’s All-Freshman Team (Fifth Team) after recording 22 catches for 298 yards and one touchdown on the season. Played in and started all 12 games in 2011 and had 20 receptions for 242 yards and two touchdowns on the year. He finished 2012 with 36 receptions for 410 yards and three touchdowns. He was named to John Mackey Mid-Season Watch List and was named Third-team All-MAC. During his senior season, Bayer played in and started all 14 games, catching 37 passes for 593 yards and 4 touchdowns. Was named third-team All-MAC as a tight end and played in the East-West Shrine Game in St. Petersburg, Florida, following the season.

=== statistics ===
Season	Team	Games		Receiving			
Season	Team	GP	GS	Rec	Yds	Avg	TD
2009	Bowling Green	Redshirt (redshirt)					
2010	Bowling Green	12	4	22	298	13.5	1
2011	Bowling Green	12	12	20	242	12.1	2
2012	Bowling Green	13	13	36	410	11.4	3
2013	Bowling Green	14	14	37	593	16.0	4
Career		51	43	115	1,543	13.4	10

== Professional career ==
=== St. Louis Rams ===
Bayer was signed by the St. Louis Rams after going undrafted in 2014 NFL draft. He played in six games during the 2014 season, recording one fumble recovery. On September 5, 2015, Bayer was released from the St. Louis Rams.

=== San Diego Chargers ===
On September 6, 2015, the San Diego Chargers signed Bayer to their practice squad. On December 9, 2015, Bayer was placed on PS-Injured Reserved and eventually cut ending his short lived NFL career.

== Coaching career ==
=== Otterbein ===
Following his playing career, Bayer joined the Otterbein Cardinals football staff as a graduate assistant coaching the tight ends for the 2017 and 2018 seasons. He graduated in April 2019 with his Master's degree in teaching.

=== Wake Forest ===
After his graduation from Otterbein, Bayer reunited with his college coach, Dave Clawson. Bayer joined the Wake Forest staff as a special teams analyst, working closely with the Deac's special teams coordinator and tight ends coach, Wayne Lineburg.

=== Valparaiso ===
Bayer spent the 2021 season as the special teams coordinator at Valparaiso. His special teams led the nation in blocked kicks, with nine.

=== Bowling Green ===
In January 2022, Bayer returned to his alma mater, Bowling Green, after being hired by Scot Loeffler as the Falcons' special teams coordinator.

=== Syracuse ===
On January 21, 2026, Bayer joined Coach Fran Brown as the special teams coordinator for Syracuse University.
