= Maikhail Miller =

American football player (1992–2016)

Profile
- Position: Quarterback

Personal information
- Born: December 28, 1992
- Died: January 30, 2016 (aged 23); Holly Springs, Mississippi, U.S.
- Listed height: 6 ft 3 in (1.91 m)
- Listed weight: 234 lb (106 kg)

Career information
- High school: Itawamba Agricultural
- College: Ole Miss (2011–2012); Murray State (2013)

Awards and highlights
- 2013 OVC All-Newcomer Team; OVC Newcomer of the Week (x5)
- Stats at ESPN

Hubert Maikhail Miller, II (December 28, 1992 – January 30, 2016) was an American football quarterback. He played for the Ole Miss Rebels and the Murray State Racers.

== Early life ==
Maikhail Miller was born on December 28, 1992, to Hubert and Charletta Miller in Columbus, Mississippi. He grew up in Fulton, Mississippi, and played high school football at Itawamba Agricultural High School. As a senior, Miller threw for 1,636 yards and 14 touchdowns and rushed for 1,148 yards and 22 scores. He was named a PrepStar All-America selection, named to The Clarion-Ledger’s Top 25 recruits list, selected to the Northeast Mississippi Daily Journal Top 10 and all-area teams, named to Orlando Sentinel All-Southern team, participated in the Bernand Blackwell Mississippi All-Star Classic, rated the No. 24 player in Mississippi and the No. 23 pro-style quarterback in the nation by Rivals.com, listed as the No. 20 quarterback in the nation by ESPN.com, and ranked the No. 45 quarterback in the nation by Scout.com. Miller also played basketball and baseball.

College recruiting
Name	Hometown	School	Height	Weight	40^{‡}	Commit date
Maikhail Miller; QB	Fulton, MS	Itawamba Agricultural	6 ft 3 in (1.91 m)	235 lb (107 kg)	unknown	Jul 19, 2010
Maikhail Miller; QB	Recruit ratings: Scout: Rivals: (79)					

== College career ==
=== Ole Miss ===
Maikhail Miller committed to the University of Mississippi on July 19, 2010. He was recruited by Houston Nutt. Miller agreed to greyshirt his first semester at Ole Miss. Following the firing of Houston Nutt in November 2011, Miller was told by Ole Miss that the grey shirts would not be brought in for 2012, opening his options back up. New Ole Miss coach Hugh Freeze ended up following through with Houston Nutt's promise, and Miller was offered a scholarship with the new 2012 signing class. Miller enrolled in January and joined the Rebels for spring drills. He appeared in two games during the 2012 season. During the September 1 game against Central Arkansas, he took over QB duties for the final drive of the game and rushed twice for 15 yards. In his second college appearance on September 22, he ran four times for at yards in the fourth quarter against Tulane.

In February 2013, Ole Miss inked two highly regarded quarterbacks Devante Kincade and Ryan Buchanan. Miller's future with Ole Miss in the QB position did not look promising. He had once been asked about exploring a new position, but that was not something Miller was interested in. In July, Ole Miss announced that Miller had elected to transfer.

=== Murray State ===
Maikhail Miller transferred to Murray State University just prior to the beginning of the Racers fall camp for the 2013 season. Miller had considered going to a junior college, but quarterback coach Dan Werner at Ole Miss referred him to Murray State. Miller talked to Racer head coach Chris Hatcher, and Miller decided to pursue a transfer to Murray State and compete for the starting position rather than going the junior college route. Since Murray State is in the FCS instead of the FBS, the move allowed Miller to be eligible to remain in NCAA Division I and play immediately without having to sit out the 2013 season. During fall camp at Murray State, Miller beat out Parks Frazier and K.D. Humphries for the starting QB spot.

Miller's first game with the Racers was the 2013 season opener against the Missouri Tigers on August 31, 2013, in Columbia Missouri. In the first game against Missouri, Miller went 16-for-32 for 145 yards and a touchdown. He also led the team with 73 yards on 11 carries, and he caught a five-yard touchdown pass. His catch against Missouri earned Miller the number eight spot on the ESPN SportsCenter Top Ten that night. In the second game of the 2013 season, the Racers set a modern-day scoring record with an 83-14 victory over Campbellsville University. In that game, Miller went 17-for-21 for 240 yards and three touchdowns. Following a win over the Missouri State Bears in week three of the 2013 season, Millter was named co-Newcomer of the Week by the Ohio Valley Conference. In the win over Missouri State, Miller went 24-of-33 for 275 yards and a career-best five touchdowns. Miller was again named Ohio Valley Conference Newcomer of the Week following an overtime win over the Jacksonville State Gamecocks on September 28, 2013. In the victory over Jacksonville State, Miller rushed for 134 yards and two touchdowns on 24 carries. He also went 14-for-26 passing for 109 yards and a touchdown. The victory over Jacksonville State was the first for the Racers since 2003.

Miller finished his sophomore season 219-for-327 for 2,331 yards and 18 touchdowns. He ranked second in the OVC in passing yards, touchdowns, passing yards per game (222.1) and total offense (265.0). Miller also rushed for 429 yards and five touchdowns, and he caught a touchdown pass. He was selected as the OVC Newcomer of the Week five times during the season, and at the close of the season he was selected to the 2013 OVC All-Newcomer team.

On April 11, 2014, Murray State coach Chris Hatcher announced that Maikhail Miller left the team for personal reasons. Miller later stated that he left because he wasn't into the game anymore and it felt more like a job.

=== Arkansas-Monticello ===
Following a brief period of time as a traditional student at Itawamba Community College, Miller enrolled at the University of Arkansas at Monticello in 2015. He participated in summer workouts with the UAM football program, with hopes of returning to the game.

== Death ==
On January 30, 2016, Miller died in a single-vehicle crash. Authorities found his SUV overturned near Holly Springs, Mississippi, and Miller was ejected from the vehicle.
