= Gabe Martin =

American football player (born 1992)

No. 50
- Position: Linebacker

Personal information
- Born: June 5, 1992 (age 34); Grand Blanc, Michigan, U.S.
- Listed height: 6 ft 2 in (1.88 m)
- Listed weight: 235 lb (107 kg)

Career information
- High school: Grand Blanc
- College: Bowling Green
- NFL draft: 2015: undrafted

Career history
- Arizona Cardinals (2015–2016); New Orleans Saints (2017); Arizona Cardinals (2017–2018)

Awards and highlights
- First-team All-MAC (2012); Second-team All-MAC (2014)

Career NFL statistics
- Total tackles: 6
- Fumble recoveries: 1
- Stats at Pro Football Reference

Gabe Martin (born June 5, 1992) is an American former professional football player who was a linebacker in the National Football League (NFL). He played college football for the Bowling Green Falcons.

== College career ==
A three-year starter at Bowling Green, Martin played in 45 games (30 starts) and finished his career with 246 tackles (144 solo), 30 tackles for loss, 10 sacks, three interceptions, 13 passes defensed, four forced fumbles, and a fumble recovery.

== Professional career ==
=== Arizona Cardinals ===
Martin signed with the Cardinals as an undrafted free agent following the 2015 NFL draft. He was released on September 5, 2015, and signed to Cardinals practice squad two days later. He was elevated to active roster on January 12, 2016.

On November 18, 2016, Martin was placed on injured reserve with a knee injury.

On February 27, 2017, Martin signed a one-year contract extension with the Cardinals. On August 5, 2017, he was waived/injured by the Cardinals and placed on injured reserve. He was waived from IR on August 9, 2017.

=== New Orleans Saints ===
On October 3, 2017, Martin was signed by the New Orleans Saints, but was released a week later and re-signed to the practice squad.

=== Arizona Cardinals (second stint) ===
On November 28, 2017, Martin was signed by the Cardinals off the Saints' practice squad. He was waived/injured on May 1, 2018, after suffering a torn Achilles in the offseason and was placed on injured reserve.
