= New York's 142nd State Assembly district =

American legislative district

Assemblymember
Patrick B. Burke; D–South Buffalo

New York's 142nd State Assembly district is one of the 150 districts in the New York State Assembly. It has been represented by Patrick B. Burke since 2019.

== Geography ==
As of 2022, the 142nd District is entirely within Erie County. It contains portions of Buffalo's Fillmore and Lovejoy wards, all of Buffalo's South ward, most of the City of Lackawanna, the town of West Seneca, and parts of the town of Orchard Park.

=== 2010s ===
District 142 is in Erie County. It contains South Buffalo, the City of Lackawanna, and the towns of West Seneca, and Orchard Park.

== Recent election results ==
=== 2026 ===
2026 New York State Assembly election, District 142
Party	Candidate	Votes	%
Democratic	Patrick Burke		
Working Families	Patrick Burke		
Total	Patrick Burke (incumbent)		
Republican	Gary Dickson		
Conservative	Gary Dickson		
Total	Gary Dickson		
Write-in			
Total votes			

=== 2024 ===
2024 New York State Assembly election, District 142
Party	Candidate	Votes	%
Democratic	Patrick Burke (incumbent)	29,192	50.6
Republican	Marc Priore	23,463	
Conservative	Marc Priore	4,912	
Total	Marc Priore	28,375	49.2
Write-in		83	0.2
Total votes		57,650	100.0
Democratic hold			

=== 2022 ===
2022 New York State Assembly election, District 142
Party	Candidate	Votes	%
Democratic	Patrick Burke (incumbent)	24,163	53.0
Republican	Sandra Magnano	16,767	
Conservative	Sandra Magnano	4,606	
Total	Sandra Magnano	21,373	46.9
Write-in		38	0.1
Total votes		45,574	100.0
Democratic hold			

=== 2020 ===
2020 New York State Assembly election, District 142
Primary election
Party	Candidate	Votes	%
Independence	Patrick Burke (incumbent)	520	52.9
Independence	Matthew Szalkowski	458	46.6
Write-in		5	0.5
Total votes		983	100
Working Families	Patrick Burke (incumbent)	46	79.3
Working Families	Madison Klimowicz	11	19.0
Write-in		1	1.7
Total votes		58	100
General election
Democratic	Patrick Burke	32,296	
Working Families	Patrick Burke	3,302	
Independence	Patrick Burke	1,160	
Total	Patrick Burke (incumbent)	36,758	56.0
Republican	Matthew Szalkowski	24,081	
Conservative	Matthew Szalkowski	4,717	
Total	Matthew Szalkowski	28,798	43.9
Write-in		51	0.1
Total votes		65,607	100.0
Democratic hold			

=== 2018 ===
2018 New York State Assembly election, District 142
Primary election
Party	Candidate	Votes	%
Republican	Erik Bohen (incumbent)	1,454	57.1
Republican	Timothy Nolan	1,092	42.9
Write-in		0	0.0
Total votes		2,546	100
Independence	Michelle Kennedy	213	52.2
Independence	Erik Bohen (incumbent)	195	47.8
Write-in		0	0.0
Total votes		408	100
Conservative	Erik Bohen (incumbent)	250	75.5
Conservative	Thomas Mescall Jr.	81	24.5
Write-in		0	0.0
Total votes		331	100
General election
Democratic	Patrick Burke	23,154	
Working Families	Patrick Burke	1,415	
Reform	Patrick Burke	266	
Total	Patrick Burke	25,195	51.9
Republican	Erik Bohen	17,650	
Conservative	Erik Bohen	4,411	
Total	Erik Bohen (incumbent)	22,061	45.4
Independence	Michelle Kennedy	1,308	2.7
Write-in		0	0.0
Total votes		48,564	100.0
Democratic gain from Republican			

=== 2018 special ===
2018 New York State Assembly special election, District 142
Party	Candidate	Votes	%
Republican	Erik Bohen	4,107	
Conservative	Erik Bohen	1,229	
Independence	Erik Bohen	742	
Total	Erik Bohen	6,078	51.5
Democratic	Patrick Burke	5,157	
Working Families	Patrick Burke	432	
Reform	Patrick Burke	94	
Total	Patrick Burke	5,683	48.2
Write-in		30	0.3
Total votes		11,791	100.0
Republican gain from Democratic			

=== 2016 ===
2016 New York State Assembly election, District 142
Party	Candidate	Votes	%
Democratic	Michael Kearns	29,996	
Republican	Michael Kearns	18,156	
Conservative	Michael Kearns	4,766	
Independence	Michael Kearns	2,629	
Total	Michael Kearns (incumbent)	55,547	100.0
Write-in		0	0.0
Total votes		55,547	100.0
Democratic hold			

=== 2014 ===
2014 New York State Assembly election, District 142
Party	Candidate	Votes	%
Democratic	Michael Kearns	16,651	
Republican	Michael Kearns	9,840	
Conservative	Michael Kearns	3,876	
Independence	Michael Kearns	2,082	
Total	Michael Kearns (incumbent)	32,449	100.0
Write-in		0	0.0
Total votes		32,449	100.0
Democratic hold			

=== 2012 ===
2012 New York State Assembly election, District 142
Party	Candidate	Votes	%
Democratic	Michael Kearns	30,372	
Republican	Michael Kearns	15,848	
Conservative	Michael Kearns	3,440	
Working Families	Michael Kearns	2,755	
Total	Michael Kearns (incumbent)	52,415	100.0
Write-in		0	0.0
Total votes		52,415	100.0
Democratic hold			
