= Jeffrey M. Conrad =

American politician from New York state

Member of the Buffalo Common Council from the South District
- In office April 8, 2005 – January 1, 2006
- Preceded by: Jimmy Griffin
- Succeeded by: Mickey Kearns

Personal details
- Born: February 27, 1979 (age 47)
- Party: Independence (2019–present)
- Other political affiliations: Democratic (before 2019)
- Education: SUNY Empire State College
- Occupation: Director

Jeffrey M. Conrad (born 1979) is an American politician who served on the Buffalo Common Council from the South District from April 2005 until January 2006. Conrad ran unsuccessfully for an at-large seat on the Buffalo Public Schools Board of Education in 2019.

== Common Council ==
Councilman and former Mayor Jimmy Griffin announced he was officially retiring from politics, and resigning from his position on the Buffalo Common Council, creating a vacancy. The Buffalo Common Council unanimously appointed Conrad, the youngest South District member in the seat's history, to fill the vacancy. Conrad served as the Claims chairman, and on the Finance and MWBE committees.

Conrad's work on the Council included reversing the City of Buffalo's plan to reduce the number of police officers, support for the creation of the Erie Canal Harbor Development Corporation, providing neighborhood protections against the placement of sex offenders throughout the City of Buffalo, an improved 50-year relicensing agreement with the New York State Power Authority, and support for additional funding for the Buffalo Public Schools.

Conrad ran for a full term in November 2005, but was defeated by Michael P. Kearns, the future New York State Assembly member and Erie County Clerk. He ran on the Independence Party, Conservative, and Working Families lines after losing the Democratic primary to Kearns.

== Post political career ==
Conrad currently is employed at Catholic Charities as the Director of Workforce & Education, his portfolio includes programming in Erie and Niagara Falls, which includes the Tomorrow's Youth Today Program, Northland Workforce Training Center, NYS Empire State Poverty Reduction Initiative in Niagara Falls, Erie County Jump Start, Erie County United Works, East Delevan Academy, and Erie County Summer Youth Program. He also served as the Communications Director to Assemblyman Erik Bohen.

== Buffalo School Board ==
Conrad announced his candidacy for the Buffalo Public Schools Board of Education in January 2019. He was unsuccessful, garnering 10% of the vote against 8 other candidates.
