= Joe Licata =

American football player and coach (born 1992)

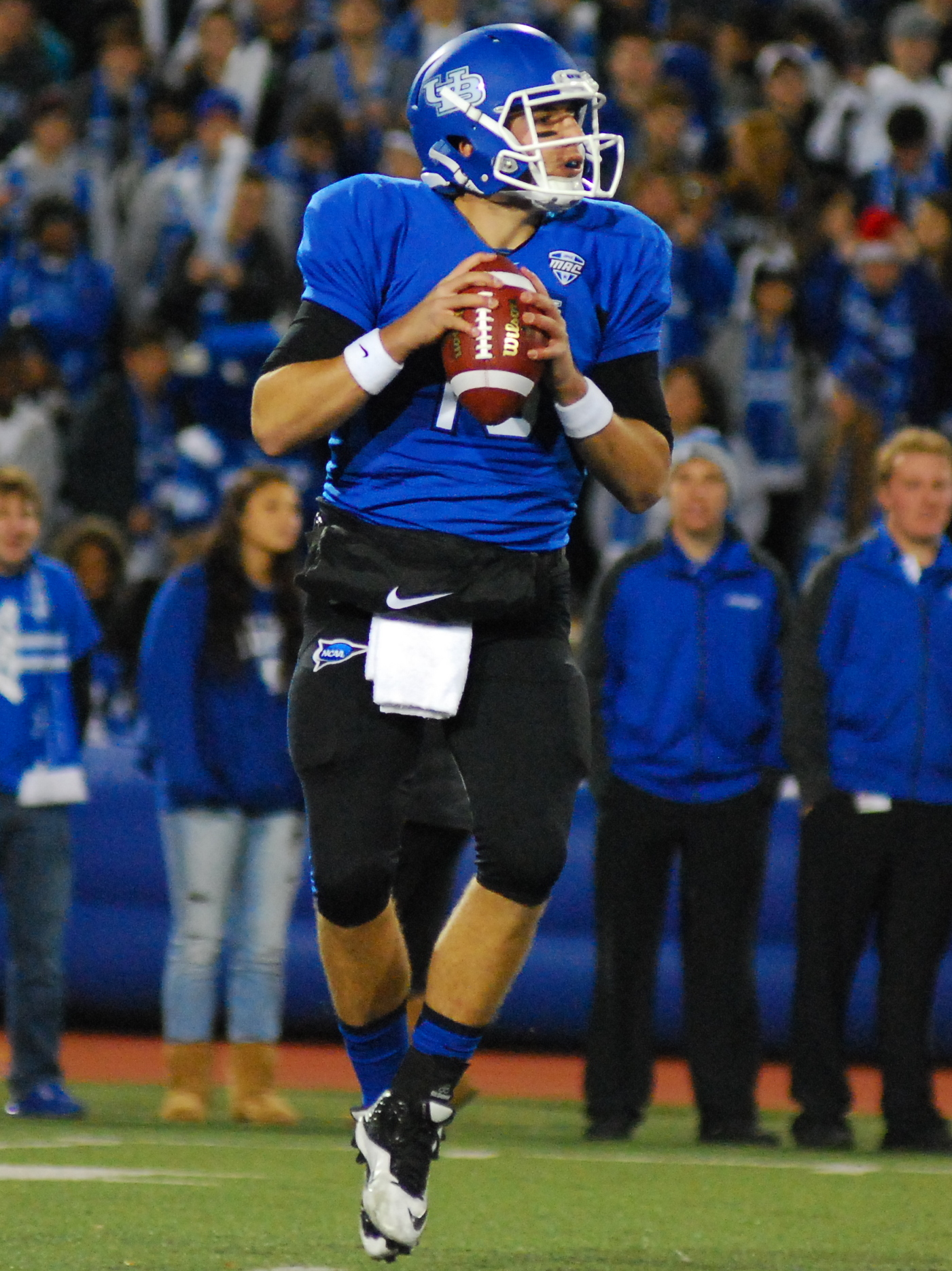
- Licata in 2013

No. 8
- Position: Quarterback

Personal information
- Born: November 16, 1992 (age 33); Williamsville, New York, U.S.
- Listed height: 6 ft 2 in (1.88 m)
- Listed weight: 210 lb (95 kg)

Career information
- High school: Williamsville South
- College: Buffalo
- NFL draft: 2016: undrafted

Career history

Playing
- Cincinnati Bengals (2016)*
- * Offseason or practice squad member only

Coaching
- Bishop Timon – St. Jude HS (2017–2020) Varsity football head coach/JV basketball head coach; Buffalo (2021) Offensive analyst; Williamsville South HS (2022–present) Football head coach

Operations
- Bishop Timon – St. Jude HS (2017–2021) Athletic director

Head coaching record
- Career: 12–33 (.267) (high school)

Joseph Gilbert Licata (born November 16, 1992) is an American football coach and former quarterback. He played college football at Buffalo. He was signed by the Cincinnati Bengals as an undrafted free agent in 2016.

== Early life ==
Licata attended Williamsville South High School in Williamsville, New York, where he played both football and basketball. As a basketball player, he set the New York State Public High School Athletic Association record for career three-point field goals made with 343. He set the school's career record for passing yards, and was named Buffalo News Player of the Year in 2010 and won The Connolly Cup. Licata received scholarship offers to play college football for Syracuse, Akron and Buffalo in addition to interest from other schools. Licata committed to the University at Buffalo, saying it "was a dream to represent Buffalo" and play for his hometown team in front of his friends and family. His little sister, Grace, plays Division III basketball at Buffalo State College.

== College career ==
Licata was redshirted as a freshman in 2011. He entered the 2012 season as the backup quarterback to Alex Zordich, but earned the starting job midway through the season and led the team to a 3–1 record over the final four games of the season. In 2013, Licata and the Bulls had one of the finest team seasons in school history, as he led the team to an 8–5 record and an appearance in the 2013 Famous Idaho Potato Bowl, the second bowl appearance in school history. During the 2014 season, Licata posted one of the finest passing seasons in Buffalo school history, throwing for 2,647 passing yards, and a school single-season record 29 passing touchdowns. The 2015 season saw Licata finish his college career by passing Drew Willy to become Buffalo's career leader in both passing yards (9,485) and passing touchdowns (76).

=== NCAA career stats ===
Year	Team	Passing										Rushing			
Year	Team	GP	GS	W	L	Comp	Att	Yds	TD	Int	Rate	Att	Yds	Avg	TD
2012	Buffalo	9	4	3	1	86	163	1045	7	3	117.1	28	-54	-1.9	0
2013	Buffalo	13	13	8	5	233	402	2824	24	8	132.7	34	-64	-1.9	1
2014	Buffalo	11	11	5	6	224	305	2647	29	11	150.7	34	-6	-0.2	2
2015	Buffalo	12	12	5	7	280	449	2969	16	15	123.0	33	-60	-1.8	1
Total		45	40	21	19	823	1359	9,485	76	37	132.2	129	-184	-1.4	4

== Professional career ==
After going undrafted in the 2016 NFL draft and receiving a pro tryout from the Buffalo Bills, on May 16, 2016 Licata was signed as an undrafted free agent by the Cincinnati Bengals. In the NFL preseason, he completed three of ten passes and threw two interceptions. Licata was released on August 29.

== Coaching career ==
On July 14, 2017, Licata accepted a position at Bishop Timon – St. Jude High School in South Buffalo, Buffalo, New York as head coach and athletic director. Here, he had the worst winning percentage of any football coach in Timon history with a record of 7–30 in 4 seasons. He also helped developed junior varsity players for Jason Rowe's varsity basketball program. On May 28, 2021, Licata accepted a position to return to the University at Buffalo as an offensive analyst on the staff of new Bulls head coach Maurice Linguist. On March 9, 2022, Licata returned to Williamsville South High School as their football head coach.

== Head coaching record ==
Year	Team	Overall	Conference	Standing	Bowl/playoffs
Bishop Timon – St. Jude Tigers (Monsignor Martin Athletic Association) (2017–2020)
2017	Bishop Timon – St. Jude	0–9	0–5	6th	L Monsignor Martin First Round
2018	Bishop Timon – St. Jude	2–9	1–3	5th	L Monsignor Martin Class B Final
2019	Bishop Timon – St. Jude	3–6	2–2	4th	W Monsignor Martin Class B Final
2020	Bishop Timon – St. Jude	2–4	2–3	2nd	
Bishop Timon – St. Jude:		7–28	5–13		
Williamsville South Billies (NYSPHSAA Section VI) (2022–present)
2022	Williamsville South	5–5	2–3	6th	
2023	Williamsville South	7-3	4-3	4th	W Class B Chuck Funke Bowl
2024	Williamsville South	5-4	4-1	5th	L Class B Quarterfinal
2025	Williamsville South	8-2	7-0	1st	L Class B Semifinal
Williamsville South:		25–14	17–7		
Total:		32–42			
