= Demone Harris =

American football player (born 1995)

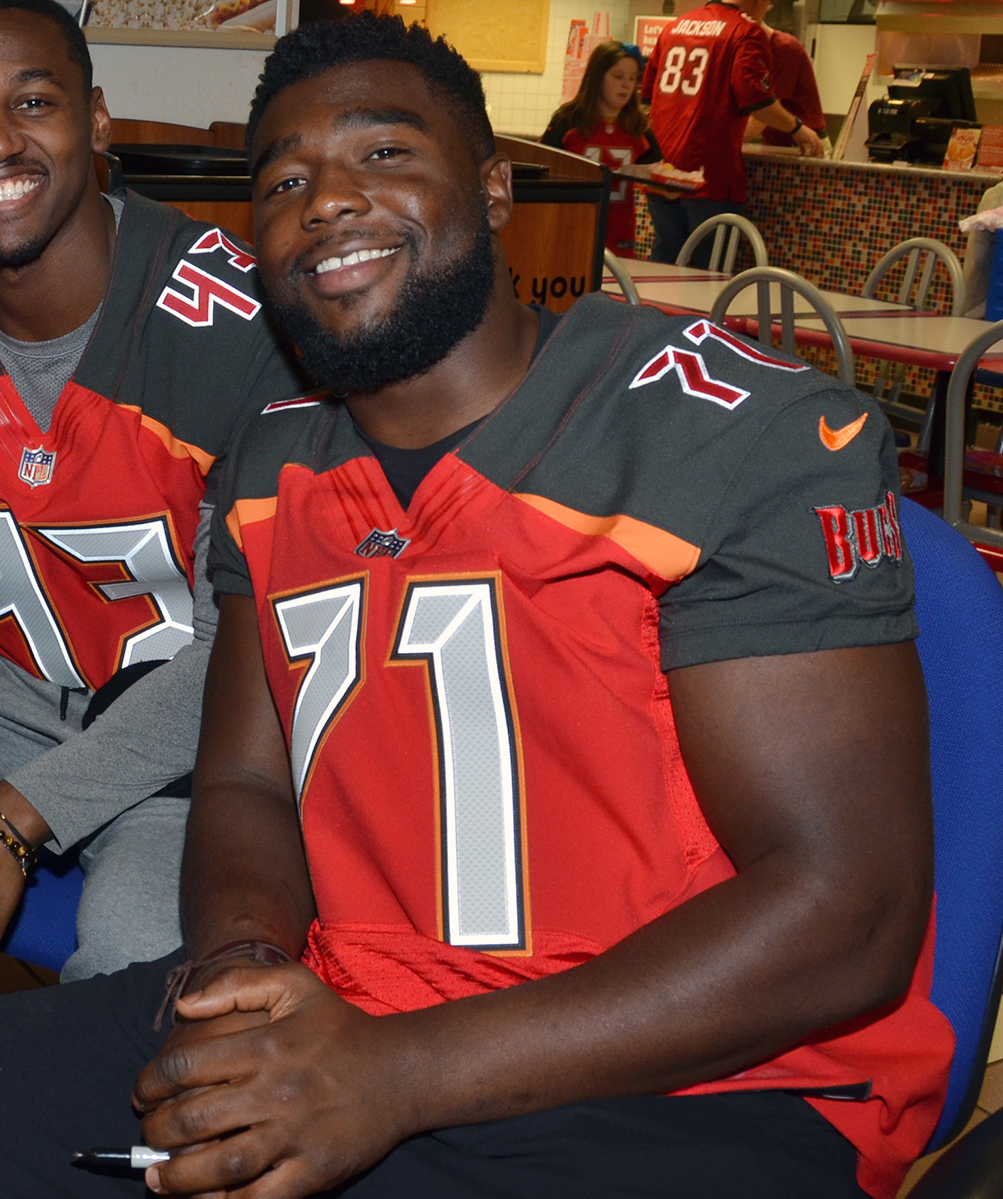
- Harris at Caserma Ederle in 2019

No. 91 – St. Louis Battlehawks
- Position: Linebacker
- Roster status: Active

Personal information
- Born: December 30, 1995 (age 30); Buffalo, New York, U.S.
- Listed height: 6 ft 4 in (1.93 m)
- Listed weight: 261 lb (118 kg)

Career information
- High school: Bishop Timon – St. Jude (South Buffalo, Buffalo)
- College: Buffalo (2013–2017)
- NFL draft: 2018: undrafted

Career history
- Tampa Bay Buccaneers (2018–2019); Baltimore Ravens (2019)*; Kansas City Chiefs (2019–2021); Houston Texans (2021–2022); Atlanta Falcons (2023–2024); San Francisco 49ers (2025)*; St. Louis Battlehawks (2026–present)
- * Offseason or practice squad member only

Awards and highlights
- Super Bowl champion (LIV); Second-team All-MAC (2017)

Career NFL statistics as of 2024
- Total tackles: 22
- Pass deflections: 2
- Stats at Pro Football Reference

Demone Harris (born December 30, 1995) is an American professional football linebacker for the St. Louis Battlehawks of the United Football League (UFL). Harris played college football for the Buffalo Bulls.

== Early life and college ==
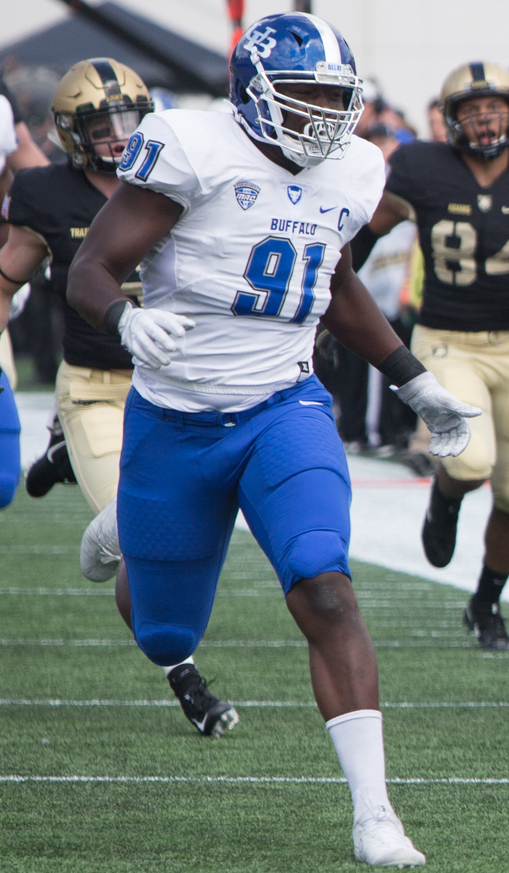
Harris with Buffalo in 2017

Harris attended Bishop Timon – St. Jude High School in Buffalo where he focused on basketball and did not play football until his junior year. Harris attended the University at Buffalo where he walked on to the football team and redshirted as a freshman. As a redshirt junior in 2017, he was nominated for the Burlsworth Trophy and named to the All-Mid-American Conference Second Team.

== Professional career ==
Pre-draft measurables
Height	Weight	Arm length	Hand span	Wingspan	40-yard dash	10-yard split	20-yard split	20-yard shuttle	Three-cone drill	Vertical jump	Broad jump
6 ft 4 in (1.93 m)	261 lb (118 kg)	33 in (0.84 m)	10 1/8 in (0.26 m)	6 ft 7 1/2 in (2.02 m)	4.89 s	1.68 s	2.82 s	4.47 s	7.39 s	32.5 in (0.83 m)	10 ft 1 in (3.07 m)
All values from Pro Day

=== Tampa Bay Buccaneers ===
Harris was signed by the Tampa Bay Buccaneers as an undrafted free agent on April 30, 2018. He was waived on September 1 and was signed to the practice squad the next day. He was promoted to the active roster on October 10 and made his NFL debut on October 14, playing four special teams snaps against the Atlanta Falcons. He was waived on November 16 and re-signed to the practice squad. Harris signed a reserve/future contract with the Buccaneers on December 31.

On October 5, 2019, Harris was waived by the Buccaneers and re-signed to the practice squad. He was released by Tampa Bay on October 15.

=== Baltimore Ravens ===
On October 22, 2019, Harris was signed to the Baltimore Ravens practice squad following an injury to Ravens linebacker Pernell McPhee.

=== Kansas City Chiefs ===
On November 21, 2019, Harris was signed by the Kansas City Chiefs off the Ravens practice squad. Harris played his first game for the Chiefs on December 8 at Gillette Stadium and recorded his first career tackle in the same game against Rex Burkhead of the New England Patriots. On February 2, 2020, Harris and the Chiefs won Super Bowl LIV 31–20 against the San Francisco 49ers.

Harris was waived by the Chiefs on November 10, 2020. He was re-signed to the team's practice squad two days later. Harris appeared in one game in the 2020 season, recording three tackles of Melvin Gordon in a blowout win over the Denver Broncos on October 25.

On February 9, 2021, Harris re-signed with the Chiefs. He was waived by Kansas City on August 31. Harris was re-signed to the practice squad the following day. He was elevated to the Chiefs' active roster via standard elevation on October 9. As part of standard elevation rules, he automatically reverted back to the practice squad after the game. Harris was elevated again the following week also via standard elevation on October 16. He was released on October 25.

=== Houston Texans ===
On November 10, 2021, Harris was signed to the Houston Texans' practice squad. He signed a reserve/future contract with the Texans on January 11, 2022.

On August 30, 2022, Harris was waived by the Texans and signed to the practice squad the next day. He was promoted to the active roster on September 10. Harris was waived on November 2 and re-signed to the practice squad.

Harris signed a reserve/future contract with Houston on January 11, 2023. On August 2, Harris was released by the Texans, and announced his retirement from the NFL.

=== Atlanta Falcons ===
On August 15, 2023, Harris came out of retirement to sign with the Atlanta Falcons. He was waived by the Falcons on August 29. Harris was re-signed to the team's practice squad on September 18. Following the end of the 2023 regular season, he signed a reserve/future contract with the Falcons on January 10, 2024.

Harris was released by the Falcons on August 27, 2024, and re-signed to the practice squad. He was promoted to the active roster on November 29.

=== San Francisco 49ers ===
On August 14, 2025, Harris signed with the San Francisco 49ers. Harris was released by San Francisco on August 20.

=== St. Louis Battlehawks ===
On March 2, 2026, Harris signed with the St. Louis Battlehawks of the United Football League (UFL).
