= Kristjan Sokoli =

Albanian American football player (born 1991)

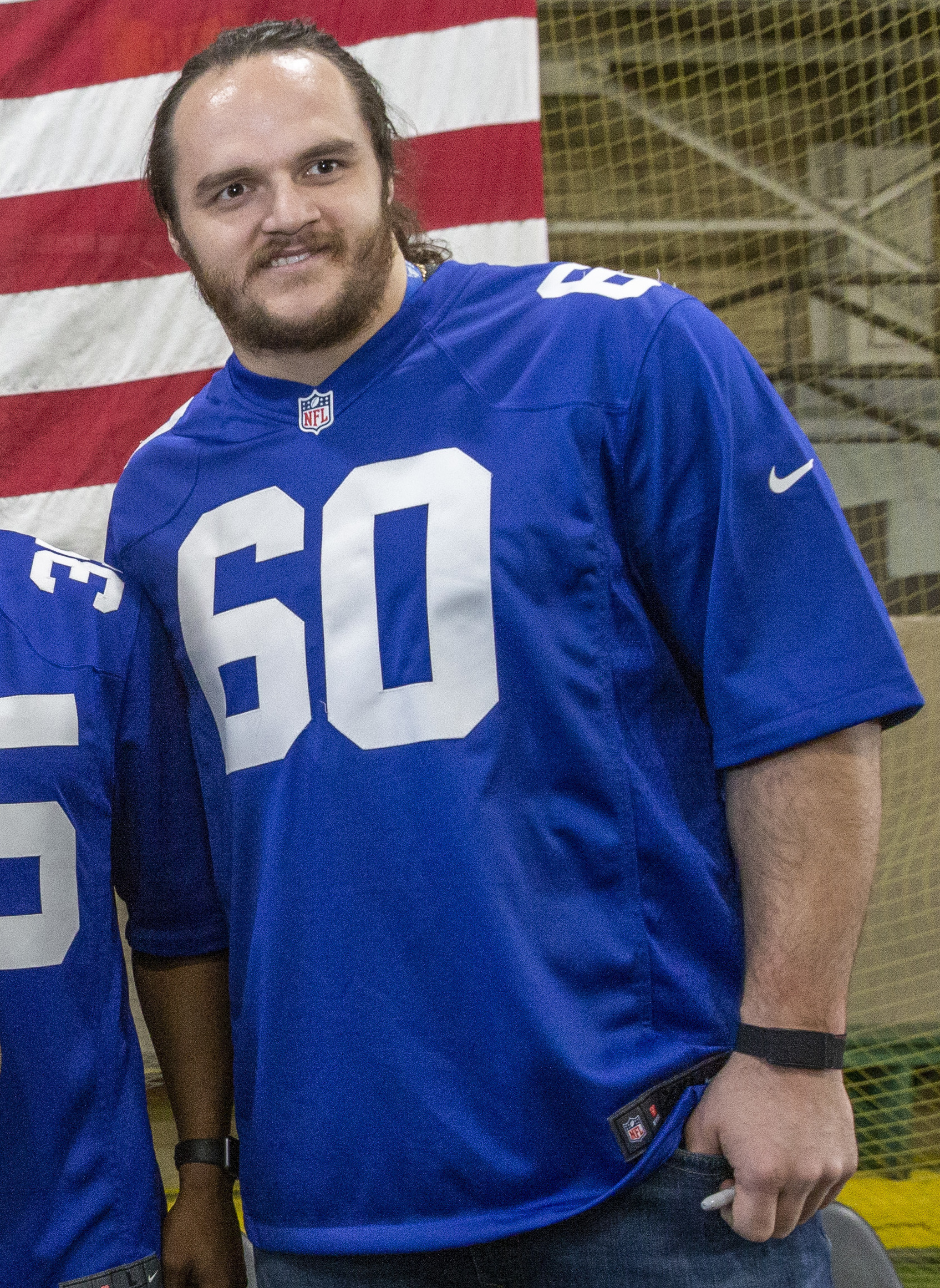
- Sokoli with the New York Giants in 2019

No. 60
- Position: Center

Personal information
- Born: September 24, 1991 (age 35); Shkodër, Albania
- Listed height: 6 ft 6 in (1.98 m)
- Listed weight: 290 lb (132 kg)

Career information
- High school: Bloomfield (Bloomfield, New Jersey, U.S.)
- College: Buffalo
- NFL draft: 2015: 6th round, 214th overall pick

Career history
- Seattle Seahawks (2015); Indianapolis Colts (2016); New Orleans Saints (2017)*; New York Giants (2017–2018); DC Defenders (2020)*; Potsdam Royals (2021); Houston Gamblers (2022–2023); Houston Roughnecks (2025)*
- * Offseason or practice squad member only

Career NFL statistics
- Games played: 1
- Stats at Pro Football Reference

Kristjan Sokoli (born September 24, 1991) is an Albanian-born former professional American football center. He was selected by the Seattle Seahawks in the sixth round of the 2015 NFL draft. He played college football at Buffalo.

== Early life ==
Sokoli's father, Gjon, fled from Shkodër, Albania to the United States seeking political asylum around the time of the Albanian Rebellion of 1997 when Kristjan was five years old. During the period of economic instability in Albania, Gjon worked in monetary exchange. When Gjon first arrived in the United States, he made $45 per day as a maintenance worker in an apartment complex, and lived in the complex's basement with other workers. Kristan's mother, Gjyste, fled to America two years after Gjon. Kristjan and his younger brother, Mark, were not able to join their parents until another two years had passed. None of the family could speak English upon arriving. Although the Sokolis are now American citizens, Kristjan still listens to Albanian music, displays an Albanian flag and speaks Albanian with his family. Edmir Sokoli, Kristjan's cousin who had come to the United States five years before Kristjan, introduced Sokoli to football when the latter was thirteen years old. Kristjan saw Edmir as a role model and looked up to him growing up.

Sokoli, known as "Moose" by his high school coach, was a three-year letterwinner in football at Bloomfield High School in Bloomfield, New Jersey where he played defensive end, left tackle, tight end, punter and placekicker. He suffered fractures on his wrist before junior and senior year of high school, which set him back a bit. He led Bloomfield to consecutive playoff berths and was named an All-Conference player. He also started for Bloomfield's basketball team and finished eighth in the state in his junior year as a discus thrower and sixth in the state his senior year. He signed a National Letter of Intent to play at the University at Buffalo in early February of his senior year.

== College career ==
At Buffalo, Sokoli moved to the defensive line full-time. When he committed to Buffalo, he stood at 6'5" and weighed 220 pounds. By his junior year, he weighed 300 pounds. He credited this to a diet of 7,000 calories per day. He redshirted during his freshman year. By his junior year, he had become a starter on the line and was an integral part of a Buffalo pass rush which was led by future first-round draft pick linebacker Khalil Mack. Sokoli helped Buffalo to the 2013 Famous Idaho Potato Bowl that season, its second bowl appearance ever and first since the 2008 season. During his senior year, he played in the 2015 Medal of Honor Bowl. He majored in Business Administration and said that he would like to work on the New York Stock Exchange if he could not make a living playing football.

== Professional career ==
Pre-draft measurables
Height	Weight	Arm length	Hand span	40-yard dash	20-yard shuttle	Three-cone drill	Vertical jump	Broad jump	Bench press
6 ft 4 1/2 in (1.94 m)	290 lb (132 kg)	34 in (0.86 m)	10 3/8 in (0.26 m)	4.84 s	4.36 s	7.19 s	38 in (0.97 m)	9 ft 11 in (3.02 m)	31 reps
All values from Buffalo pro day

=== Seattle Seahawks ===
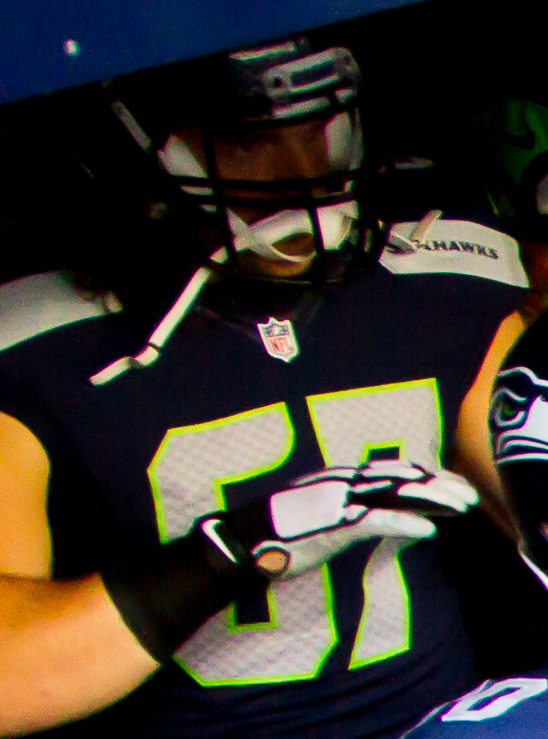
Sokoli with the Seattle Seahawks in 2015

Sokoli was not invited to the NFL Scouting Combine. The Seattle Seahawks selected Sokoli in the sixth round of the 2015 NFL draft with the 214th overall pick. Despite taking two other collegiate offensive lineman in the draft, the Seahawks and offensive line coach Tom Cable discussed moving Sokoli from the defensive line to center, a position which Sokoli had never played before. He became the first Albanian-born player to play in a National Football League game. He appeared in eight plays in the 2015 season, all on special teams in Week 16.

On August 30, 2016, Sokoli was waived by the Seahawks.

=== Indianapolis Colts ===
On September 26, 2016, Sokoli was signed to the practice squad of the Indianapolis Colts as a defensive end. He was promoted to the active roster on December 19, 2016.

On June 15, 2017, Sokoli was waived by the Colts.

=== New Orleans Saints ===
On July 25, 2017, Sokoli signed with the New Orleans Saints as an offensive lineman. He was waived on September 2, 2017, and was signed to the practice squad the next day. He was released on September 6, 2017.

=== New York Giants ===
On December 27, 2017, Sokoli was signed to the New York Giants' practice squad. He signed a reserve/future contract with the Giants on January 1, 2018.

On August 11, 2018, Sokoli was placed on injured reserve after suffering a torn ACL.

=== DC Defenders ===
In October 2019, Sokoli was selected by the DC Defenders of the XFL in the open phase of the 2020 XFL draft. He was waived during final roster cuts on January 22, 2020.

Sokoli was assigned to the Alphas of The Spring League.

=== Potsdam Royals ===
Sokoli was signed by the Potsdam Royals of the German Football League in 2021.

=== Houston Gamblers ===
On March 10, 2022, Sokoli was drafted by the Houston Gamblers of the United States Football League. He was released on September 19, 2023.

=== Houston Roughnecks ===
On January 8, 2025, Sokoli signed with the Houston Roughnecks of the United Football League (UFL). He was released on March 20, 2025.

=== Retirement ===
On April 4, 2025, Sokoli officially announced his retirement from American football.

== NFL career statistics ==
=== Regular season ===
Year	Team	Games		Tackles				Interceptions						Fumbles	
Year	Team	GP	GS	Comb	Total	Ast	Sck	PD	Int	Yds	Avg	Lng	TDs	FF	FR
2015	SEA	1	0	0	0	0	0.0	0	0	0	0	0	0	0	0
2016	IND	0	0	0	0	0	0.0	0	0	0	0	0	0	0	0
Career		1	0	0	0	0	0	0	0	0	0	0	0	0	0
