= Bishop Timon – St. Jude High School =

Bishop Timon - St. Jude High School

Location
- 601 McKinley Parkway Buffalo; Erie County, New York 14220; United States; 42°50′54″N 78°49′6″W

Information
- Former name: Bishop Timon High School (1946)
- Type: Private Roman Catholic independent All-Male college-preparatory high school
- Motto: Latin: Fortes In Fide; English: Strong in Faith
- Religious affiliation: Roman Catholic (Franciscan)
- Patron saint: St. Francis of Assisi
- Established: 1946; 80 years ago
- Founder: John Francis O'Hara
- Principal: Dr. James Newton
- Chaplain: Fr. Greg Dobson
- Grades: 9-12
- Enrollment: 320 (2024)
- Colors: Green and Gold
- Fight song: Lift Up the Green & the Gold
- Athletics: 16 teams: Varsity; Junior Varsity; Freshman
- Athletics conference: Monsignor Martin Athletic Association
- Sports: List: baseball; basketball; football; soccer; bowling; crew; cross country; golf; hockey; lacrosse; track and field
- Mascot: Tiger
- Team name: Tigers
- Rival: St. Francis High School Canisus High School, St. Joe’s High School, St. Mary’s High School, Cardinal O’Hara
- Accreditation: Middle States Association of Colleges and Schools
- Publication: The Juvenalist (literary magazine)
- Newspaper: The Tidings
- Yearbook: The Talisman
- Alumni: 8,000+
- Website: www.bishoptimon.com

Bishop Timon – St. Jude High School (formerly Bishop Timon High School) is a Roman Catholic Franciscan high school for young men administered and staffed by the Order of Friars Minor located in South Buffalo, New York. Bishop Timon High School, as it was originally known, was founded in 1946 by the Franciscan.

== History ==
In 1946, the school officially opened its doors with a class of 76 freshmen. For three years, Bishop Timon – St. Jude High School was temporarily housed at Our Lady of Perpetual Help in Buffalo's old First Ward. On September 6, 1949, Timon moved into its current home on McKinley Parkway with an enrollment of approximately 800 young men. In June 1950, Bishop O'Hara awarded diplomas to Bishop Timon's first graduating class. The school was named Bishop Timon after Buffalo's first bishop, John Timon. In 1993, the school added St. Jude to its name.

Bishop Timon High School was founded by Roman Catholic priests of the Franciscan Order Minor, with the idea of providing a quality education at an affordable cost for the largely working-class Irish-American community within the proximity of its South Buffalo neighborhood location. The Franciscan commitment to the needs of the area was the impetus for opening this all-boys college preparatory high-school to the local neighborhood's mostly blue-collar residents.

== Campus ==
The primary building of the school is located at 601 McKinley Parkway which holds includes a newly completed of 2,800-square-foot athletic training facility. The third floor contains a 6,000 square foot (540 m^{2}) Center For Media & The Arts. This area maintains a working sound recording studio. It also is home to music and art studios, a graphic design lab, a video production lab, and a photography darkroom. In 2003, Timon High School opened the Science and Pre-Engineering Center. An Advanced Placement Conference & Technology room was also built, allowing the school to use distance learning with other schools through conferencing software. In 2021, Timon High School opened their E-Sports Center, a room used for the STEM classes for grades 9-12.

In 1963 Timon opened a Freshman Annex located on Como Ave. named after Monsignor Nash of Holy Family Parish to accommodate its growing enrollment during its peak years of the 60s and 70s. The Annex closed in 1977

== Alumni ==
- Steve Barnes - Attorney, Founding Partner, Cellino & Barnes
- Erik Bohen - NYS Assemblyman
- George Breen - Olympic swimmer
- Connor Fields - Professional lacrosse player in the Premier Lacrosse League
- Michael P. Kearns - NYS Assemblyman
- Jim Kelley- Sportswriter
- Whitey Martin - Former NBA player
- Johnny McCarthy - Professional Basketball Coach/Player
- Louis Mustillo - Actor
- Demone Harris - Professional Football player
- James T. Molloy - Doorkeeper to the United States House of Representatives
- Carl Paladino- Politician/Business Leader
- Jack Quinn - President of Erie Community College
- Christopher P. Scanlon - Mayor of Buffalo
- Mark Schroeder - Commissioner of New York State Department of Motor Vehicles
- Rickey Williams - Retired NBA player
- John F. Carroll - Third tallest verified human in recorded history
