= Erin Gehen =

American ice hockey player

- Born: August 22, 1996 (age 29) West Seneca, New York, United States
- Height: 5 ft 3 in (160 cm)
- Position: Forward
- Shoots: Right
- PHF team Former teams: Buffalo Beauts; Buffalo State Bengals
- Playing career: 2014–present

Erin Gehen is an American ice hockey forward, currently playing with the Buffalo Beauts of the National Women's Hockey League (NWHL).

== Career ==
Gehen began playing hockey at the age of four and played on boys' teams in the Cazenovia Park Hockey Association until she reached the U12 level. In her high school league, the first girls' varsity league to be founded in the region, she scored 189 points in 71 games, including 112 goals.

From 2014 to 2018, she attended Buffalo State College, where she would score 95 points across 105 NCAA Division III games with the Bengals, setting programme records for games, points, goals, assists, and shorthanded goals. She scored a career high 29 points in 27 games during the 2016–17 season, scoring a hat-trick in the opening game of the season. In January 2018, she became the first Buffalo State College player to score 50 career goals.

After stepping away from competitive hockey during the 2018–19 season, she signed her first professional contract with the PHF's Buffalo Beauts ahead of the 2019–20 NWHL season after being asked by Beauts general manager Mandy Cronin to attend a practice as a try-out. Originally playing on a line with Brooke Stacey and stepping up to take more minutes after Stacey left the team for her pregnancy, she scored 16 points in 24 games in her rookie PHF season, good for fourth on the team. Her first PHF goal came as the game-winning goal in a victory over the Connecticut Whale in November 2019, and she scored the game-winning goal of the Beauts' last regular season game.

She re-signed with the Beauts for the 2020-21 season.

== Personal life ==
Gehen has a bachelor's degree in Business Administration from Buffalo State College and earned a spot on the dean’s honours list multiple times. She has served as a volunteer assistant coach for Elmira College's women's ice hockey programme since 2018.

== Career statistics ==
			Regular season					Playoffs
Season	Team	League	GP	G	A	Pts	PIM	GP	G	A	Pts	PIM
2014–15	Buffalo State Bengals	NCAA III	26	7	14	21	22	-	-	-	-	-
2015–16	Buffalo State Bengals	NCAA III	25	17	10	27	18	-	-	-	-	-
2016–17	Buffalo State Bengals	NCAA III	27	18	11	29	20	-	-	-	-	-
2017–18	Buffalo State Bengals	NCAA III	26	12	6	18	22	-	-	-	-	-
2019-20	Buffalo Beauts	PHF	24	7	9	16	20	1	0	0	0	0
PHF totals			24	7	9	16	20	1	0	0	0	0
