= John F. Carroll =

Third tallest person in recorded history (1932–1969)

John Francis Carroll
- Born: June 15, 1932; Buffalo, New York, U.S.
- Died: August 8, 1969 (aged 37); Smithtown, New York, U.S.
- Other names: Buffalo Giant, Big Red, Jack
- Known for: Third tallest verified human in recorded history
- Height: 8 ft 7.75 in (263.52 cm)

John Francis Carroll (June 15, 1932 – August 8, 1969) was an American giant and one of 29 known people in medical history to have verifiably reached a height of 8 feet (240 cm) or more. He suffered from severe, 2-dimensional spinal curvature (kyphoscoliosis) and acromegalic gigantism. He had a standing height of 8 ft 1/4 in (244 cm) on October 14, 1959, at age 27, but according to calculations, his height would have been 8 ft 8 in (264 cm), assuming normal curvature of the spine. In 1968, he was later measured at 7 ft 10 1/2 in (240 cm), having shrunk in stature due to his worsening spinal condition.

== Early life ==
Carroll was born on June 15, 1932, in Buffalo, New York, to John J. Carroll and his wife Johanna Evans Carroll. His birth weight, 9 pounds 5 ounces, was typical, and his parents saw nothing unusual in his infant development. He was the second of three children. Carroll's parents were both born in Ireland but emigrated to the United States and settled in Buffalo shortly before John was born.

Neither of his parents were exceptionally tall, although both had examples of extremely tall people in their family histories, including at least one ancestor on both his mother's and father's side that was said to have exceeded 7 ft 0 in (213 cm) in height. As his childhood progressed, Carroll grew noticeably taller than his peers, reaching 5 ft 6 in (168 cm) by the age of 12.

At age 16, Carroll, standing at 6 ft 2 in (188 cm), was noted as a muscular and well-coordinated star of his high-school basketball team. Despite severe calf pain, he remained healthy and strong. Shortly after his 16th birthday, his health took a concerning turn when, instead of beginning to slow down, his growth rate increased. By the age of 17, he was 6 ft 9 in (206 cm) tall, having grown seven inches (18 cm) in just one year. According to Carroll's World War II draft registration card on June 15, 1950, his height was listed as 6 ft 10 in (208 cm). He graduated from Bishop Timon High School in 1950.

== Adulthood ==
His immense growth continued in to his early 20s, now accompanied by an increasing curvature of the spine (kyphoscoliosis) and a decline in muscle tone and strength, especially in his legs. By age 20, his height had passed 7 ft 0 in (213 cm), and by 22, he had grown to 7 ft 6 in (229 cm). His growth continued despite extensive treatments. As an adult, he had to use crutches due to deformities in his left leg, and although he could drive, he had to remove the front seat of his car and drive from the rear. As his condition worsened, his standing height decreased.

Carroll died on August 8, 1969, at Deaconess Hospital in Smithtown, New York, at the age of 37. His cause of death was kidney failure, which was related to a degenerative condition caused by his gigantism. He was buried in Holy Cross Cemetery in Lackawanna, New York. He was third in stature only to Robert Wadlow and John Rogan.
