= 2009 Buffalo mayoral election =

- November 3, 2009
- Turnout: 6.60%
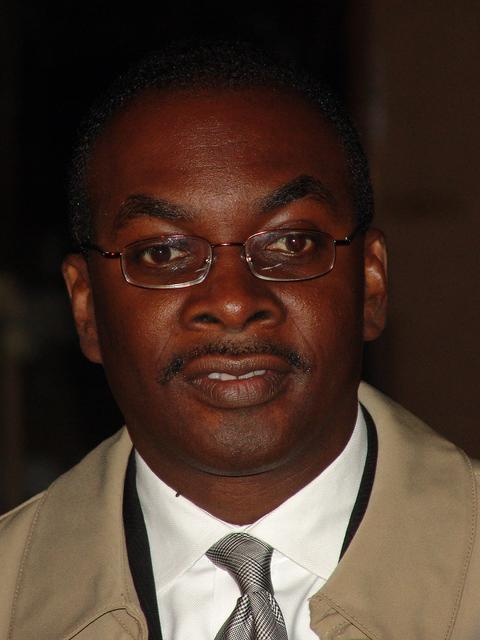
Nominee	Byron Brown
Party	Democratic
Alliance	Working Families; Conservative; Independence
Popular vote	17,728
Percentage	99.12%
- Results by city council district Brown: >90%
Mayor before election
Byron Brown
Elected mayor
Byron Brown

A mayoral election took place in Buffalo, New York, on November 3, 2009. Incumbent Democratic mayor Byron Brown won re-election to a second term.

== Primary ==
The primary election was held on September 15, 2009. Incumbent Mayor Byron Brown defeated South District Councilmember Michael P. Kearns.

Democratic primary results
Party	Candidate	Votes	%
Democratic	Byron W. Brown (incumbent)	26,314	58.76%
Democratic	Michael P. Kearns	14,866	41.24%
Total votes		44,780	100%

== General ==
Under New York's electoral fusion law, Brown received the party endorsements of not only the Democratic party, but also of the Independence, Conservative, and Working Families parties.

The Republican Party did not field a candidate. Independent candidate Matthew Ricchiazzi withdrew from the race after his petition to get on the ballot was rejected by the Board of Elections. Thus, Brown was unopposed in the general election.

General election results
Party	Candidate	Votes	%
Democratic	Byron W. Brown (incumbent)	15,567	87.03%
Working Families	Byron W. Brown (incumbent)	851	4.76%
Independence	Byron W. Brown (incumbent)	667	3.73%
Conservative	Byron W. Brown (incumbent)	643	3.59%
Total	Byron W. Brown (incumbent)	17,728	99.12%
Independent	Michael P. Kearns (write-in)	158	0.88%
Total votes		17,886	100%

== See also ==
- List of mayors of Buffalo, New York
