= Patrick B. Burke =

American politician (born 1984)

Pat Burke
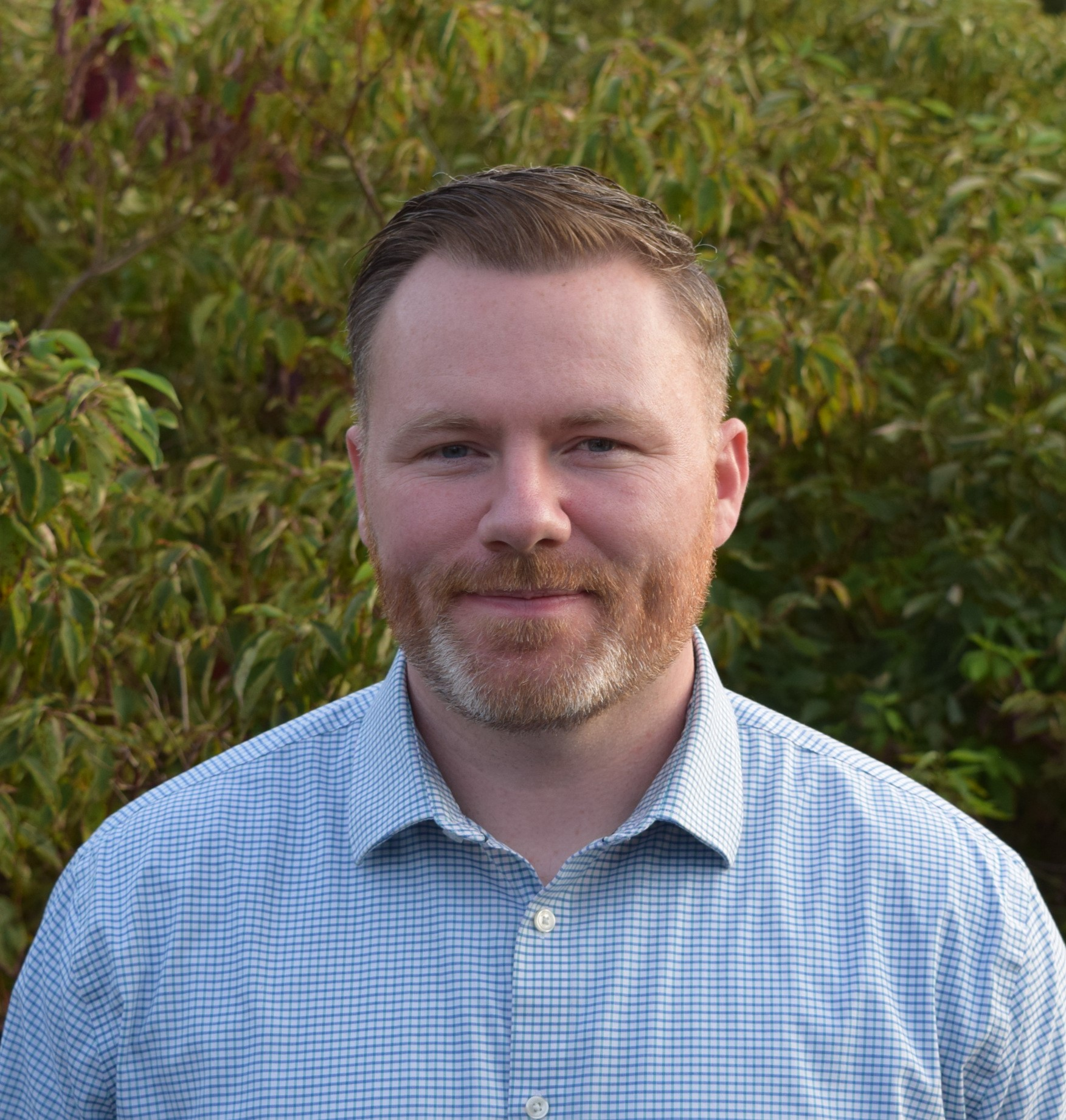

Member of the New York State Assembly from the 142nd district
- Incumbent
- Assumed office January 2, 2019
- Preceded by: Erik Bohen

Member of the Erie County Legislature from the 7th district
- In office 2013–2018
- Preceded by: Thomas Mazur
- Succeeded by: Timothy Meyers

Personal details
- Born: June 22, 1984 (age 42) Buffalo, New York, U.S.
- Party: Democratic
- Children: 3
- Education: Buffalo State College (BA)
- Website: State Assembly website

Patrick B. Burke (born June 22, 1984) is an American politician who serves in the New York State Assembly from the 142nd district, which represents South Buffalo, the City of Lackawanna, and the towns of West Seneca and Orchard Park. Burke is a South Buffalo native.

== Erie County Legislature ==
Burke was first elected to the 7th District of the Erie County Legislature in 2013.

In August 2015, Burke sponsored a bill that became the first microbead ban in the state of New York. It bans the sale and distribution of all plastic microbeads (including biodegradable ones) including from personal care products. As of September 2015, its prohibition on sales is decent. It was enacted on August 12, 2015 and took effect in February, 2016. In November 2015, four other NY counties followed suit.

In 2015, Burke released a plan to create a regional municipal broadband network as co-chair of the Erie County Municipal Broadband Project Committee. The report argued that affordable, high-speed municipal broadband internet service in Erie County would create faster job and business growth, while raising property values.

Burke introduced the Prevention of Emotional Neglect and Childhood Endangerment Act, named for Vice President Mike Pence. The law bans conversion therapy, and went into effect upon filing with the New York Department of State on March 7, 2018.

== State Assembly ==
Burke won the November 6, 2018 election for the 142nd district of the New York State Assembly.

During the 203rd New York State Legislature, Burke co-sponsored laws that allow early voting, no-excuse absentee voting, and regulate political donations by Limited Liability Companies.

In 2018, Burke called on Diocese of Buffalo Bishop Richard Joseph Malone to resign over accusations of negligence concerning investigations into priests accused of sexual abuse. On January 28, 2019, Burke co-sponsored the Child Victims Act that allows prosecutors to bring criminal charges until a victim turns 28, and permits victims to sue until age 55.

Burke cosponsored Assembly Bill A576, which passed the State Assembly on January 15, 2019 by a vote of 141-7, and passed the State Senate that same day by a vote of 57-4. The bill expanded the Erie County conversion therapy ban to cover the entire state, and was signed by Governor Andrew Cuomo on January 25, 2019, taking effect immediately upon receiving his signature. Since 2016, conversion therapy has been banned in New York from coverage by insurers and Medicaid, or from being practiced by any state-licensed or operated mental health facility per executive order.

In February 2019, Burke joined his fellow Western New York elected officials in condemning Governor Cuomo's budget that cut state Aid and Incentives Municipalities funding for nearly all towns and villages.

In April 2019, Burke introduced and passed legislation that permits the New York Office of Victim Services to provide compensation and funding to a broader classification of child victims, for uses such as mental health counseling and transportation to court appearances. In March 2021, Burke called on then-Governor Andrew Cuomo to resign over allegations of sexual harassment.

In November 2020, Burke won the November 3, 2020 election for the 142nd Assembly District. Burke, the incumbent, was uncontested in the Democratic Primary and challenged by Republican Matthew Szalkowski in the general election.

In November 2021, Assembly Bill A7564, which was introduced by Burke, was signed by the Governor. This bill, which passed in both the Assembly and Senate, encourages the elimination of certain single-use plastics in both the SUNY and CUNY systems.

In December 2021, Assembly Bill A6057, which was introduced by Burke, passed by both the Assembly and the Senate, and signed by the Governor. This bill mandated that the Commissioner of Health is to establish and implement an infection inspection audit and checklist on nursing homes.

In July 2022, Burke announced funding that he secured for the public libraries in his district. The funding was used to update the exterior of libraries, update reading materials, and purchase new technology, such as a 3D printer and projector screen.

In July 2022, Burke announced $1 million in funding that he secured for the West Seneca and Orchard Park School Districts. This money is to be used to improve the schools overall safety.

In August 2022, Burke was named chair of the Great Lakes Watershed Task Force. This task force was created by Assembly Speaker Carl E. Heastie.

In September 2022, Burke announced funds secured in the amount of $160,000 for the Lackawanna Fire Department. Announced at Lackawanna Fire Station #3, this funding is to be used to purchase a second set of gear, commonly referred to as turnout gear for all Lackawanna Firefighters.

In January 2024, Burke was named chair of the Standing Committee on Cities in the NYS Assembly.

== Controversies ==
In November 2021, Burke announced that he was drafting a bill that would give health insurance companies the option to deny healthcare coverage to unvaccinated people for any COVID-19-related treatments. The bill was deemed highly controversial by multiple elected officials.

In May 2022, former Burke staffers came out against him, saying that they were fired after calling on Burke to speak out against the 2022 Buffalo shooting. Burke's former director of community relations said that Burke had stated "I'm not giving up my seat for this issue". Burke called the comments "bizarre, offensive, and completely off base".
