= Peter Ratchuk =

American ice hockey player (born 1977)

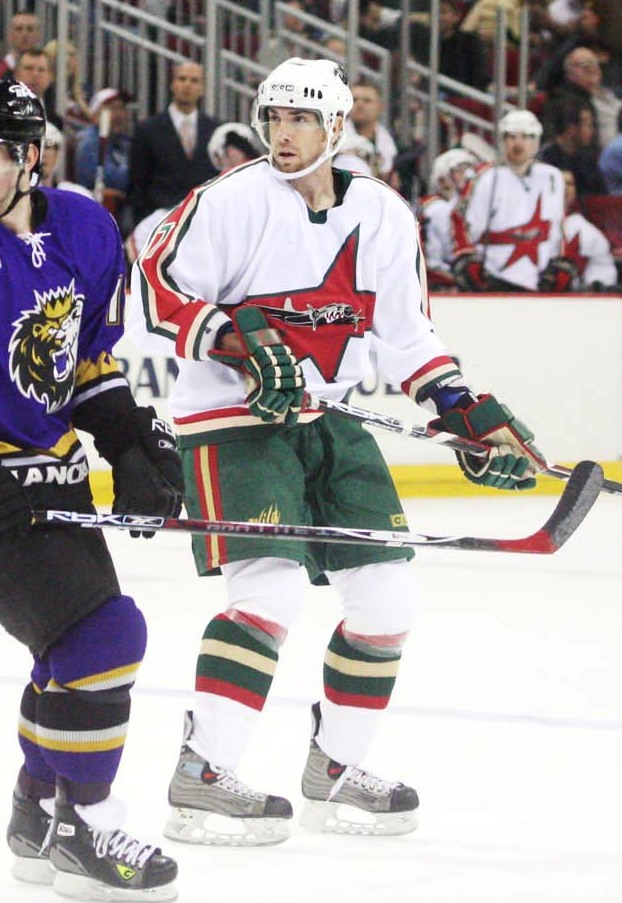
- Ratchuk with the Houston Aeros in 2007
- Born: September 10, 1977 (age 48) Buffalo, New York, U.S.
- Height: 6 ft 1 in (185 cm)
- Weight: 195 lb (88 kg; 13 st 13 lb)
- Position: Defense
- Shot: Left
- Played for: Florida Panthers; Frankfurt Lions; Adler Mannheim; DEG Metro Stars; Hamburg Freezers; EC KAC
- NHL draft: 25th overall, 1996; Colorado Avalanche
- Playing career: 1998–2011

Peter J. Ratchuk (born September 10, 1977) is an American former professional ice hockey defenseman who played in the National Hockey League with the Florida Panthers. Peter is the older brother of Mike Ratchuk, a defenseman who has played most of his career in American minor leagues.

== Playing career ==
Ratchuk was drafted in the first round, 25th overall, by the Colorado Avalanche in the 1996 NHL entry draft. He grew up playing for the Cazenovia Chiefs. After his freshman year with Bowling Green State University, Ratchuk moved to the QMJHL with Hull Olympiques before turning pro.

Ratchuk was signed as a free agent by the Florida Panthers prior to the 1998–99 season. He played 32 games with the Panthers over two seasons, 1998–99 and 2000–01. He scored one goal and one assist.

After that, he was picked up by his hometown team, the Buffalo Sabres. During the 2002 preseason, he was sent down to that team's farm club, the Rochester Americans, for the 2002–03 season, then left to play in Germany. This resulted in a rather amusing error in ESPN's hockey recaps—in Sabres game recaps, Ratchuk's name would often be used mistakenly to refer to Dmitri Kalinin, a then current Sabres defenseman. Both Ratchuk and Kalinin wore #45, and ESPN never dissociated Ratchuk from the Sabres in their database when he left the league, resulting in the error.

After playing three seasons in Germany's DEL, Ratchuk returned to North America in 2006–07 signing with the Minnesota Wild on June 6, 2006. Ratchuk split the season between the American Hockey League's Houston Aeros and Wilkes-Barre/Scranton Penguins. Ratchuk then returned to the DEL with the DEG Metro Stars and after his second season with the Stars he was released on April 20, 2009. On June 21, 2009, Peter signed with fellow DEL team Hamburg Freezers for the 2009–10.

On April 29, 2010, after failing to make the playoffs with the Freezers, Ratchuk left for the Austrian Hockey League's Klagenfurt AC. He played the majority of the 2010-11 season with Klagenfurt posting 19 points in 39 games before leaving for the Swiss National League A, to join Rapperswil-Jona Lakers on January 30, 2011, to end the year.

Following the conclusion of the season, Ratchuk retired and was announced as a scout for the newly revived Winnipeg Jets association of the NHL.

== Career statistics ==
			Regular season					Playoffs
Season	Team	League	GP	G	A	Pts	PIM	GP	G	A	Pts	PIM
1994–95	Lawrence Academy	HS–Prep	31	8	15	23	18	—	—	—	—	—
1995–96	Shattuck–Saint Mary's	Midget	32	22	28	50	24	—	—	—	—	—
1996–97	Bowling Green State University	CCHA	35	9	12	21	14	—	—	—	—	—
1997–98	Hull Olympiques	QMJHL	60	23	31	54	34	11	3	6	9	8
1998–99	Beast of New Haven	AHL	53	7	20	27	44	—	—	—	—	—
1998–99	Florida Panthers	NHL	24	1	1	2	10	—	—	—	—	—
1999–2000	Louisville Panthers	AHL	76	9	17	26	64	4	1	2	3	0
2000–01	Louisville Panthers	AHL	64	5	13	18	85	—	—	—	—	—
2000–01	Florida Panthers	NHL	8	0	0	0	0	—	—	—	—	—
2001–02	Wilkes–Barre/Scranton Penguins	AHL	75	16	23	39	55	—	—	—	—	—
2002–03	Rochester Americans	AHL	70	11	21	32	64	3	0	1	1	6
2003–04	Frankfurt Lions	DEL	52	21	22	43	80	15	1	5	6	16
2004–05	Frankfurt Lions	DEL	51	10	26	36	102	11	2	3	5	14
2005–06	Adler Mannheim	DEL	52	12	24	36	88	—	—	—	—	—
2006–07	Houston Aeros	AHL	50	5	16	21	74	—	—	—	—	—
2006–07	Wilkes–Barre/Scranton Penguins	AHL	22	2	5	7	22	10	0	1	1	8
2007–08	DEG Metro Stars	DEL	54	10	26	36	111	13	1	4	5	10
2008–09	DEG Metro Stars	DEL	47	5	16	21	54	16	0	4	4	24
2009–10	Hamburg Freezers	DEL	56	9	23	32	48	—	—	—	—	—
2010–11	EC KAC	EBEL	39	6	13	19	24	—	—	—	—	—
2010–11	Rapperswil–Jona Lakers	NLA	1	0	0	0	4	—	—	—	—	—
AHL totals			410	55	115	170	408	17	1	4	5	14
NHL totals			32	1	1	2	10	—	—	—	—	—
DEL totals			312	67	137	204	473	55	4	16	20	64

Awards and achievements
Preceded by Marc Denis	Colorado Avalanche first-round draft pick 1996	Succeeded by Kevin Grimes
