= 2013 Famous Idaho Potato Bowl =

Buffalo Bulls	San Diego State Aztecs
(8–4)	(7–5)
MAC	Mountain West
24	49
Head coach: Jeff Quinn	Head coach: Rocky Long
	1	2	3	4	Total
Buffalo	0	10	0	14	24
San Diego State	7	21	14	7	49
- Date: December 21, 2013
- Season: 2013
- Stadium: Bronco Stadium
- Location: Boise, Idaho
- Favorite: Buffalo by 3
- Referee: Jeff Hilyer (Sun Belt)
- Attendance: 21,951
- Payout: US$$325,000 per team

United States TV coverage
- Network: ESPN
- Announcers: Clay Matvick (play-by-play), Matt Stinchcomb (analyst), Dawn Davenport (sidelines)

The 2013 Famous Idaho Potato Bowl was an American college football bowl game that was played on December 21, 2013, at Bronco Stadium on the campus of Boise State University in Boise, Idaho. The seventeenth annual Famous Idaho Potato Bowl, it featured the Buffalo Bulls of the Mid-American Conference against the San Diego State Aztecs of the Mountain West Conference. It began at 3:30 p.m. MST and aired on ESPN. It was one of the 2013–14 bowl games that concluded the 2013 FBS football season. San Diego State defeated Buffalo, 49–24.

== Teams ==
The Bulls accepted their invitation after earning an 8–4 record in their season, while the Aztecs accepted their invitation after earning a 7–5 record in theirs.

=== Buffalo Bulls ===
The Bulls returned to their winning ways this season, finishing at 8–4 overall and 6–2 in conference play, good for second place in the MAC's East Division. At season's end, bowl director Kevin McDonald extended an invitation to the Bulls to play in the game.

This was Buffalo's first Famous Idaho Potato Bowl appearance. The University at Buffalo was led by Khalil Mack, who was the MAC Defensive Player of the Year, with team-high 94 tackles, 19 TFLs, 10.5 sacks, three interceptions and five forced fumbles. Buffalo has seven players named to All-MAC Teams, with five on the first team.

=== San Diego State Aztecs ===
The Aztecs continued their recent winning ways this season, finishing at 7–5 overall and 6–2 in conference play, good for second place in the Mountain West's West Division. At season's end, bowl director Kevin McDonald extended an invitation to the Aztecs to play in the game.

This will be San Diego State's first Famous Idaho Potato Bowl, setting a school-record fourth consecutive bowl game. Quarterback Quinn Kaehler has thrown for 2,796 yards and 17 touchdowns for coach Rocky Long this season.

== Game summary ==
=== Scoring summary ===
Scoring summary

Quarter	Time	Drive			Team	Scoring information	Score	
Quarter	Time	Plays	Yards	TOP	Team	Scoring information	Buffalo	San Diego State
1	0:21	4	55	1:06	SDSU	Quinn Kaehler 29-yard touchdown run, Wes Feer kick good	0	7
2	11:55	6	30	2:49	SDSU	Adam Muema 3-yard touchdown run, Feer kick good	0	14
2	7:51	10	75	4:04	BUFF	Branden Oliver 10-yard touchdown reception from Joe Licata, Patrick Clarke kick good	7	14
2	4:01	6	25	2:40	BUFF	38-yard field goal by Clarke	10	14
2	1:11	5	67	2:55	SDSU	Muema 8-yard touchdown run, Feer kick good	10	21
2	0:38	1	25	0:07	SDSU	Dylan Denso 25-yard touchdown reception from Kaehler, Feer kick good	10	28
3	13:28	5	26	1:32	SDSU	Adam Roberts 11-yard touchdown reception from Kaehler, Feer kick good	10	35
3	8:18	9	62	4:19	SDSU	Chad Young 1-yard touchdown run, Feer kick good	10	42
4	14:53	7	73	2:38	BUFF	Alex Neutz 23-yard touchdown reception from Licata, Clarke kick good	17	42
4	6:40	2	43	0:46	SDSU	Muema 30-yard touchdown run, Feer kick good	17	49
4	0:36	14	75	6:04	BUFF	Fred Lee 10-yard touchdown reception from Licata, Clarke kick good	24	49
"TOP" = time of possession. For other American football terms, see Glossary of American football.							24	49

=== Statistics ===
Statistics	BUFF	SDSU
First downs	20	22
Total offense, plays – yards	68–309	70–460
Rushes-yards (net)	38-113	42-249
Passing yards (net)	196	211
Passes, Comp-Att-Int	13-30-1	15-28-0
Time of Possession	27:27	32:24

=== Starting lineups ===
Buffalo	Position	San Diego State
Offense
Fred Lee	WR	Ezell Ruffin
John Kling	LT	Bryce Quigley
Andre Davis	LG	Japheth Gordon
Trevor Sales	C	Jordan Smith
Dillon Guy	RG	Darrell Greene
Jake Silas	RT	Terry Poole
Matt Weiser	TE	Adam Roberts
Alex Neutz	WR	Colin Lockett
Joe Licata	QB	Quinn Kaehler
Branden Oliver	RB	Adam Muema
Kendall Patterson	FB	Chad Young
Defense
Beau Bachtelle	LE	Cody Galea
Kristjan Sokoli	NT	Dontrel Onuoha
Colby Way	RE	Jordan Thomas
Adam Redden	LOLB	Nick Tenhaeff
Blake Bean	LILB–MLB	Josh Gavert
Lee Skinner	RILB–CB	Nat Berhe
Khalil Mack	ROLB	Vaness Harris
Cortney Lester	LCB	J.J. Whittaker
Najja Johnson	RCB	King Holder
Okoye Houston	SS	Marcus Andrews
Derek Brim	FS	Eric Pinkins
