= South Park Avenue =

- Length: 12 mi (19 km)
- Location: Erie County

South Park Avenue is a street connecting Buffalo to Hamburg in New York, United States. South Park Avenue is the most important street in South Buffalo and is the primary alternative to the Buffalo Skyway (New York State Route 5) when traveling between the city and the southern suburbs.

South Park Avenue is U.S. Route 62 between Bailey Avenue and the southern terminus.

== Route ==
Mile	Name
0	KeyBank Center
0.1	NFTA Rail Maintenance Yard
2.9	South Park Avenue becomes part of U.S. Route 62
5.0	Buffalo and Erie County Botanical Gardens
5.2	Our Lady of Victory Basilica
5.6	Bridge over Smoke Creek
7.7	New York State Route 179
9.4	U.S. Route 20
9.9	Immaculata Academy
12.1	Terminus
