= 2013 Buffalo Bulls football team =

American college football season

2013 Buffalo Bulls football

Famous Idaho Potato Bowl, L 24–49 vs. San Diego State
- Conference: Mid-American Conference
- East Division
- Record: 8–5 (6–2 MAC)
- Head coach: Jeff Quinn (4th season)
- Offensive coordinator: Alex Wood (3rd season)
- Offensive scheme: Multiple
- Defensive coordinator: Lou Tepper (2nd season)
- Base defense: 3–4
- Captains: Jasen Carlson; Khalil Mack; Alex Neutz; Branden Oliver; Colby Way
- Home stadium: University at Buffalo Stadium

2013 Mid-American Conference football standings
| | Conf. | | | Overall |
| Team | W | | L | W | | L |
|---|---|---|---|---|---|---|
East Division
| Bowling Green x$ | 7 | – | 1 | 10 | – | 4 |
| Buffalo | 6 | – | 2 | 8 | – | 5 |
| Ohio | 4 | – | 4 | 7 | – | 6 |
| Akron | 4 | – | 4 | 5 | – | 7 |
| Kent State | 3 | – | 5 | 4 | – | 8 |
| UMass | 1 | – | 7 | 1 | – | 11 |
| Miami (OH) | 0 | – | 8 | 0 | – | 12 |
West Division
| Northern Illinois x | 8 | – | 0 | 12 | – | 2 |
| Ball State | 7 | – | 1 | 10 | – | 3 |
| Toledo | 5 | – | 3 | 7 | – | 5 |
| Central Michigan | 5 | – | 3 | 6 | – | 6 |
| Eastern Michigan | 1 | – | 7 | 2 | – | 10 |
| Western Michigan | 1 | – | 7 | 1 | – | 11 |
Championship: Bowling Green 47, Northern Illinois 27
$ – Conference champion; x – Division champion/co-champions

The 2013 Buffalo Bulls football team represented the University at Buffalo as a member of the Mid-American Conference (MAC) during the 2013 NCAA Division I FBS football season. Led by fourth-year head coach Jeff Quinn, the Bulls compiled an overall record of 8–5 with a mark of 6–2 in conference play, placing second in the MAC's East Division. Buffalo was invited to the Famous Idaho Potato Bowl, only the second bowl game in program history, where the Bulls lost to San Diego State. The team played home games at the University at Buffalo Stadium in Amherst, New York.

== Schedule ==
| Date | Time | Opponent | Site | TV | Result | Attendance |
|---|---|---|---|---|---|---|
| August 31 | 12:00 pm | at No. 2 Ohio State* | Ohio Stadium; Columbus, OH | ESPN2 | L 20–40 | 103,980 |
| September 7 | 3:30 pm | at No. 23 Baylor* | Floyd Casey Stadium; Waco, TX | FSN | L 13–70 | 39,126 |
| September 14 | 3:30 pm | No. 17 (FCS) Stony Brook* | University at Buffalo Stadium; Amherst, NY | ESPN3 | W 26–23 ^{5OT} | 24,013 |
| September 28 | 3:30 pm | UConn* | University at Buffalo Stadium; Amherst, NY | ESPN3 | W 41–12 | 20,952 |
| October 5 | 12:00 pm | Eastern Michigan^{†} | University at Buffalo Stadium; Amherst, NY | ESPN Plus | W 42–14 | 23,602 |
| October 12 | 2:00 pm | at Western Michigan | Waldo Stadium; Kalamazoo, MI | ESPN3 | W 33–0 | 14,722 |
| October 19 | 3:30 pm | UMass | University at Buffalo Stadium; Amherst, NY (rivalry) | TWCS | W 32–3 | 18,707 |
| October 26 | 3:30 pm | at Kent State | Dix Stadium; Kent, OH | TWCS | W 41–21 | 14,197 |
| November 5 | 8:00 pm | Ohio | University at Buffalo Stadium; Amherst, NY | ESPN2 | W 30–3 | 22,918 |
| November 12 | 7:30 pm | at Toledo | Glass Bowl; Toledo, OH | ESPNU | L 41–51 | 15,036 |
| November 19 | 8:00 pm | at Miami (OH) | Yager Stadium; Oxford, OH | ESPNU | W 44–7 | 9,895 |
| November 29 | 1:30 pm | vs. Bowling Green | Ralph Wilson Stadium; Orchard Park, NY | ESPNU | L 7–24 | 26,226 |
| December 21 | 5:30 pm | vs. San Diego State* | Bronco Stadium; Boise, ID (Famous Idaho Potato Bowl) | ESPN | L 24–49 | 21,951 |
*Non-conference game; ^{†}Homecoming; Rankings from AP Poll released prior to the game; All times are in Eastern time

== Rankings ==
Ranking movements Legend: ██ Increase in ranking ██ Decrease in ranking — = Not ranked RV = Received votes
| | Week | | | | | | | | | | | | | | | | |
| Poll | Pre | 1 | 2 | 3 | 4 | 5 | 6 | 7 | 8 | 9 | 10 | 11 | 12 | 13 | 14 | 15 | Final |
|---|---|---|---|---|---|---|---|---|---|---|---|---|---|---|---|---|---|
| AP | — | — | — | — | — | — | — | — | — | — | — | — | — | — | — | — | — |
| Coaches | — | — | — | — | — | — | — | — | — | — | — | RV | — | — | — | — | — |
| Harris | Not released | | | | | | | — | — | — | — | — | — | — | — | — | Not released |
| BCS | Not released | | | | | | | | — | — | — | — | — | — | — | — | Not released |

== Game summaries ==
=== @ Ohio State ===
Buffalo @ Ohio State

| Team | 1 | 2 | 3 | 4 | Total |
|---|---|---|---|---|---|
| Bulls | 0 | 13 | 7 | 0 | 20 |
| • #2 Buckeyes | 23 | 7 | 7 | 3 | 40 |

- Date: August 31
- Location: Ohio Stadium
  Columbus, OH
- Game start: 12:03 p.m. EDT
- Elapsed time: 3:18
- Game attendance: 103,980
- Game weather: Partly Cloudy, 79 °F (26 °C)
- Referee: Shawn Smith
- TV announcers (ESPN2): Beth Mowins (play-by-play), Joey Galloway (color)

In their first game of the season, the Bulls lost, 40–20 to the Ohio State Buckeyes.

Scoring summary

| Quarter | Time | Drive | | | Team | Scoring information | Score | |
| Quarter | Time | Plays | Yards | TOP | Team | Scoring information | Buffalo | Ohio State |
|---|---|---|---|---|---|---|---|---|
| 1 | 10:40 | 4 | 63 | 1:09 | Ohio State | Devin Smith 47-yard touchdown reception from Braxton Miller, 2-point run good | 0 | 8 |
| 1 | 7:05 | 5 | 61 | 1:20 | Ohio State | Chris Fields 7-yard touchdown reception from Braxton Miller, 2-point pass good | 0 | 16 |
| 1 | 0:38 | 8 | 84 | 3:46 | Ohio State | Jordan Hall 49-yard touchdown run, Drew Basil kick good | 0 | 23 |
| 2 | 9:18 | 3 | 44 | 0:58 | Buffalo | Matt Weiser 16-yard touchdown reception from Joe Licata, Patrick Clarke kick good | 7 | 23 |
| 2 | 7:10 | | | | Buffalo | Interception returned 45 yards for touchdown by Khalil Mack, 2-point pass failed | 13 | 23 |
| 2 | 6:53 | 1 | 37 | 0:06 | Ohio State | Jordan Hall 37-yard touchdown run, Drew Basil kick good | 13 | 30 |
| 3 | 10:21 | 7 | 62 | 2:37 | Buffalo | Alex Neutz 10-yard touchdown reception from Joe Licata, Patrick Clarke kick good | 20 | 30 |
| 3 | 3:16 | 14 | 91 | 6:59 | Ohio State | Chris Fields 21-yard touchdown reception from Kenny Guiton, Drew Basil kick good | 20 | 37 |
| 4 | 7:05 | 10 | 76 | 5:13 | Ohio State | 39-yard field goal by Drew Basil | 20 | 40 |
| "TOP" = time of possession. For other American football terms, see Glossary of American football. | | | | | | | 20 | 40 |

=== @ Baylor ===
Buffalo @ Baylor

| Team | 1 | 2 | 3 | 4 | Total |
|---|---|---|---|---|---|
| Bulls | 13 | 0 | 0 | 0 | 13 |
| • Bears | 28 | 28 | 7 | 7 | 70 |

- Date: September 7
- Location: Floyd Casey Stadium
  Waco, TX
- Game start: 3:30 p.m. EDT
- Game attendance: 39,126
- Game weather: Scattered Clouds, 97 °F (36 °C)
- Referee: Alan Eck
- Television network: FSN

In their second game of the season, the Bulls lost, 70–13 to the Baylor Bears.

Scoring summary

| Quarter | Time | Drive | | | Team | Scoring information | Score | |
| Quarter | Time | Plays | Yards | TOP | Team | Scoring information | Buffalo | Baylor |
|---|---|---|---|---|---|---|---|---|
| 1 | 11:22 | 8 | 75 | 3:38 | Buffalo | Branden Oliver 1-yard touchdown run, Patrick Clarke kick good | 7 | 0 |
| 1 | 10:28 | 4 | 76 | 0:54 | Baylor | Tevin Reese 61-yard touchdown reception from Bryce Petty, Aaron Jones kick good | 7 | 7 |
| 1 | 6:37 | 5 | 83 | 0:51 | Baylor | Shock Linwood 3-yard touchdown run, Aaron Jones kick good | 7 | 14 |
| 1 | 3:52 | 7 | 53 | 1:16 | Baylor | Lache Seastrunk 8-yard touchdown run, Aaron Jones kick good | 7 | 21 |
| 1 | 2:11 | 4 | 60 | 1:41 | Buffalo | Alex Neutz 14-yard touchdown reception from Joe Licata, Patrick Clarke kick failed | 13 | 21 |
| 1 | 1:04 | 3 | 89 | 1:07 | Baylor | Antwan Goodley 83-yard touchdown reception from Bryce Petty, Aaron Jones kick good | 13 | 28 |
| 2 | 11:27 | 8 | 45 | 1:43 | Baylor | Bryce Petty 5-yard touchdown run, Aaron Jones kick good | 13 | 35 |
| 2 | 7:11 | 8 | 62 | 1:54 | Baylor | Lache Seastrunk 1-yard touchdown run, Aaron Jones kick good | 13 | 42 |
| 2 | 5:18 | | | | Baylor | Fumble recovery returned 91 yards for touchdown by Bryce Hager, Aaron Jones kick good | 13 | 49 |
| 2 | 3:52 | 2 | 45 | 0:20 | Baylor | Lache Seastrunk 33-yard touchdown run, Aaron Jones kick good | 13 | 56 |
| 3 | 13:56 | 5 | 75 | 1:04 | Baylor | Shock Linwood 6-yard touchdown run, Aaron Jones kick good | 13 | 63 |
| 4 | 10:22 | 4 | 80 | 1:29 | Baylor | Jay Lee 53-yard touchdown reception from Seth Russell, Kyle Peterson kick good | 13 | 70 |
| "TOP" = time of possession. For other American football terms, see Glossary of American football. | | | | | | | 13 | 70 |

=== Stony Brook ===
Stony Brook @ Buffalo

| Team | 1 | 2 | 3 | 4 | OT | 2OT | 3OT | 4OT | 5OT | Total |
|---|---|---|---|---|---|---|---|---|---|---|
| Seawolves | 0 | 0 | 0 | 10 | 3 | 7 | 0 | 0 | 3 | 23 |
| • Bulls | 3 | 0 | 7 | 0 | 3 | 7 | 0 | 0 | 6 | 26 |

- Date: September 14
- Location: UB Stadium
  Amherst, NY
- Game start: 3:30 p.m. EDT
- Game attendance: 24,013
- Game weather: Partly Sunny, 61 °F (16 °C)
- Referee: Stan Evans
- Television network: ESPN3

In their third game of the season, the Bulls won, 26–23, in 5 overtimes, over the Stony Brook Seawolves.

Scoring summary

| Quarter | Time | Drive | | | Team | Scoring information | Score | |
| Quarter | Time | Plays | Yards | TOP | Team | Scoring information | Stony Brook | Buffalo |
|---|---|---|---|---|---|---|---|---|
| 1 | 2:12 | 10 | 43 | 3:58 | Buffalo | 17-yard field goal by Patrick Clarke | 0 | 3 |
| 3 | 5:35 | 3 | 27 | 0:45 | Buffalo | Anthone Taylor 1-yard touchdown run, Patrick Clarke kick good | 0 | 10 |
| 4 | 11:07 | 12 | 76 | 4:54 | Stony Brook | 22-yard field goal by Nick Ferrara | 3 | 10 |
| 4 | 0:29 | 15 | 80 | 3:59 | Stony Brook | Malcolm Eugene 5-yard touchdown reception from Lyle Negron, Nick Ferrara kick good | 10 | 10 |
| OT | | 4 | 5 | | Stony Brook | 37-yard field goal by Nick Ferrara | 13 | 10 |
| OT | | 4 | -1 | | Buffalo | 42-yard field goal by Patrick Clarke | 13 | 13 |
| 2OT | | 4 | 25 | | Buffalo | Alex Neutz 3-yard touchdown reception from Joe Licata, Patrick Clarke kick good | 13 | 20 |
| 2OT | | 6 | 25 | | Stony Brook | Malcolm Eugene 10-yard touchdown reception from Lyle Negron, Nick Ferrara kick good | 20 | 20 |
| 5OT | | 7 | 17 | | Stony Brook | 25-yard field goal by Nick Ferrara | 23 | 20 |
| 5OT | | 2 | 25 | | Buffalo | Anthone Taylor 6-yard touchdown run, kick not attempted | 23 | 26 |
| "TOP" = time of possession. For other American football terms, see Glossary of American football. | | | | | | | 23 | 26 |

=== UConn ===
Connecticut @ Buffalo

| Team | 1 | 2 | 3 | 4 | Total |
|---|---|---|---|---|---|
| Huskies | 3 | 9 | 0 | 0 | 12 |
| • Bulls | 14 | 14 | 6 | 7 | 41 |

- Date: September 28
- Location: UB Stadium
  Amherst, NY
- Game start: 3:30 p.m. EDT
- Game attendance: 20,952
- Game weather: Mostly Sunny, 73 °F (23 °C)
- Referee: Jeff Maconaghy
- Television network: ESPN3

In their fourth game of the season, the Bulls won, 41–12 over the UConn Huskies.

Scoring summary

| Quarter | Time | Drive | | | Team | Scoring information | Score | |
| Quarter | Time | Plays | Yards | TOP | Team | Scoring information | Connecticut | Buffalo |
|---|---|---|---|---|---|---|---|---|
| 1 | 12:18 | 4 | 8 | 1:27 | Buffalo | Mason Schreck 5-yard touchdown reception from Joe Licata, Patrick Clarke kick good | 0 | 7 |
| 1 | 6:20 | 12 | 59 | 5:58 | Connecticut | 33-yard field goal by Chad Christen | 3 | 7 |
| 1 | 2:16 | | | | Buffalo | Interception returned 33 yards for touchdown by Najja Johnson, Patrick Clarke kick good | 3 | 14 |
| 2 | 13:10 | 9 | 55 | 4:06 | Connecticut | 37-yard field goal by Chad Christen | 6 | 14 |
| 2 | 11:17 | 4 | 76 | 1:45 | Buffalo | Branden Oliver 5-yard touchdown run, Patrick Clarke kick good | 6 | 21 |
| 2 | 6:28 | 4 | 62 | 1:25 | Buffalo | Alex Neutz 22-yard touchdown reception from Joe Licata, Patrick Clarke kick good | 6 | 28 |
| 2 | 3:54 | 7 | 75 | 2:34 | Connecticut | Lyle McCombs 2-yard touchdown run, 2-point pass failed | 12 | 28 |
| 3 | 5:21 | 10 | 26 | 3:30 | Buffalo | 49-yard field goal by Patrick Clarke | 12 | 31 |
| 3 | 2:36 | 5 | 19 | 2:21 | Buffalo | 50-yard field goal by Patrick Clarke | 12 | 34 |
| 4 | 10:29 | 9 | 64 | 4:39 | Buffalo | Fred Lee 36-yard touchdown reception from Joe Licata, Patrick Clarke kick good | 12 | 41 |
| "TOP" = time of possession. For other American football terms, see Glossary of American football. | | | | | | | 12 | 41 |

=== Eastern Michigan ===
Eastern Michigan @ Buffalo

| Team | 1 | 2 | 3 | 4 | Total |
|---|---|---|---|---|---|
| Eagles | 0 | 7 | 0 | 7 | 14 |
| • Bulls | 14 | 14 | 14 | 0 | 42 |

- Date: October 5
- Location: UB Stadium
  Amherst, NY
- Game start: 12:00 p.m. EDT
- Game attendance: 23,602
- Game weather: Cloudy, 65 °F (18 °C)
- Referee: Mark Kluczynski
- Television network: ESPN+

In their fifth game of the season, the Bulls won, 42–14 over the Eastern Michigan Eagles.

Scoring summary

| Quarter | Time | Drive | | | Team | Scoring information | Score | |
| Quarter | Time | Plays | Yards | TOP | Team | Scoring information | Eastern Michigan | Buffalo |
|---|---|---|---|---|---|---|---|---|
| 1 | 10:19 | 6 | 77 | 2:36 | Buffalo | Branden Oliver 60-yard touchdown run, Patrick Clarke kick good | 0 | 7 |
| 1 | 0:20 | 5 | 16 | 1:57 | Buffalo | Branden Oliver 2-yard touchdown run, Patrick Clarke kick good | 0 | 14 |
| 2 | 7:01 | 11 | 99 | 6:10 | Buffalo | Joe Licata 1-yard touchdown run, Patrick Clarke kick good | 0 | 21 |
| 2 | 4:39 | 5 | 72 | 2:16 | Eastern Michigan | Jay Jones 15-yard touchdown reception from Tyler Benz, Dylan Mulder kick good | 7 | 21 |
| 2 | 4:18 | 1 | 96 | | Buffalo | Devin Campbell 96-yard kickoff return, Patrick Clarke kick good | 7 | 28 |
| 3 | 9:32 | 11 | 69 | 5:21 | Buffalo | Devin Campbell 1-yard touchdown run, Patrick Clarke kick good | 7 | 35 |
| 3 | 2:49 | 7 | 72 | 2:58 | Buffalo | Alex Neutz 27-yard touchdown reception from Joe Licata, Patrick Clarke kick good | 7 | 42 |
| 4 | 1:29 | 2 | 79 | 0:53 | Eastern Michigan | Ryan Brumfield 75-yard touchdown run, Dylan Mulder kick good | 14 | 42 |
| "TOP" = time of possession. For other American football terms, see Glossary of American football. | | | | | | | 14 | 42 |

=== @ Western Michigan ===
Buffalo @ Western Michigan

| Team | 1 | 2 | 3 | 4 | Total |
|---|---|---|---|---|---|
| • Bulls | 6 | 0 | 17 | 10 | 33 |
| Broncos | 0 | 0 | 0 | 0 | 0 |

- Date: October 12
- Location: Waldo Stadium
  Kalamazoo, MI
- Game start: 2:00 p.m. EDT
- Game attendance: 14,722
- Game weather: Clear, 73 °F (23 °C)
- Referee: Rod Snodgrass
- Television network: ESPN3

In their sixth game of the season, the Bulls won, 33–0 over the Western Michigan Broncos.

Scoring summary

| Quarter | Time | Drive | | | Team | Scoring information | Score | |
| Quarter | Time | Plays | Yards | TOP | Team | Scoring information | Buffalo | Western Michigan |
|---|---|---|---|---|---|---|---|---|
| 1 | 9:27 | 12 | 63 | 5:33 | Buffalo | Devin Campbell 1-yard touchdown run, Patrick Clarke kick blocked | 6 | 0 |
| 3 | 13:24 | 4 | 2 | 1:18 | Buffalo | 51-yard field goal by Patrick Clarke | 9 | 0 |
| 3 | 8:48 | 6 | 39 | 2:23 | Buffalo | Mason Schreck 2-yard touchdown reception from Joe Licata, Patrick Clarke kick good | 16 | 0 |
| 3 | 5:42 | 5 | 53 | 2:08 | Buffalo | Fred Lee 28-yard touchdown reception from Joe Licata, Patrick Clarke kick good | 23 | 0 |
| 4 | 12:00 | 14 | 60 | 6:12 | Buffalo | Alex Neutz 2-yard touchdown reception from Joe Licata, Patrick Clarke kick good | 30 | 0 |
| 4 | 6:27 | 9 | 39 | 4:09 | Buffalo | 36-yard field goal by Patrick Clarke | 33 | 0 |
| "TOP" = time of possession. For other American football terms, see Glossary of American football. | | | | | | | 33 | 0 |

=== Massachusetts ===
Massachusetts @ Buffalo

| Team | 1 | 2 | 3 | 4 | Total |
|---|---|---|---|---|---|
| Minutemen | 0 | 3 | 0 | 0 | 3 |
| • Bulls | 0 | 13 | 5 | 14 | 32 |

- Date: October 19
- Location: UB Stadium
  Amherst, NY
- Game start: 3:30 p.m. EDT
- Game attendance: 18,707
- Game weather: Cloudy, showers, 57 °F (14 °C)
- Referee: Stan Evans
- Television network: TWCS

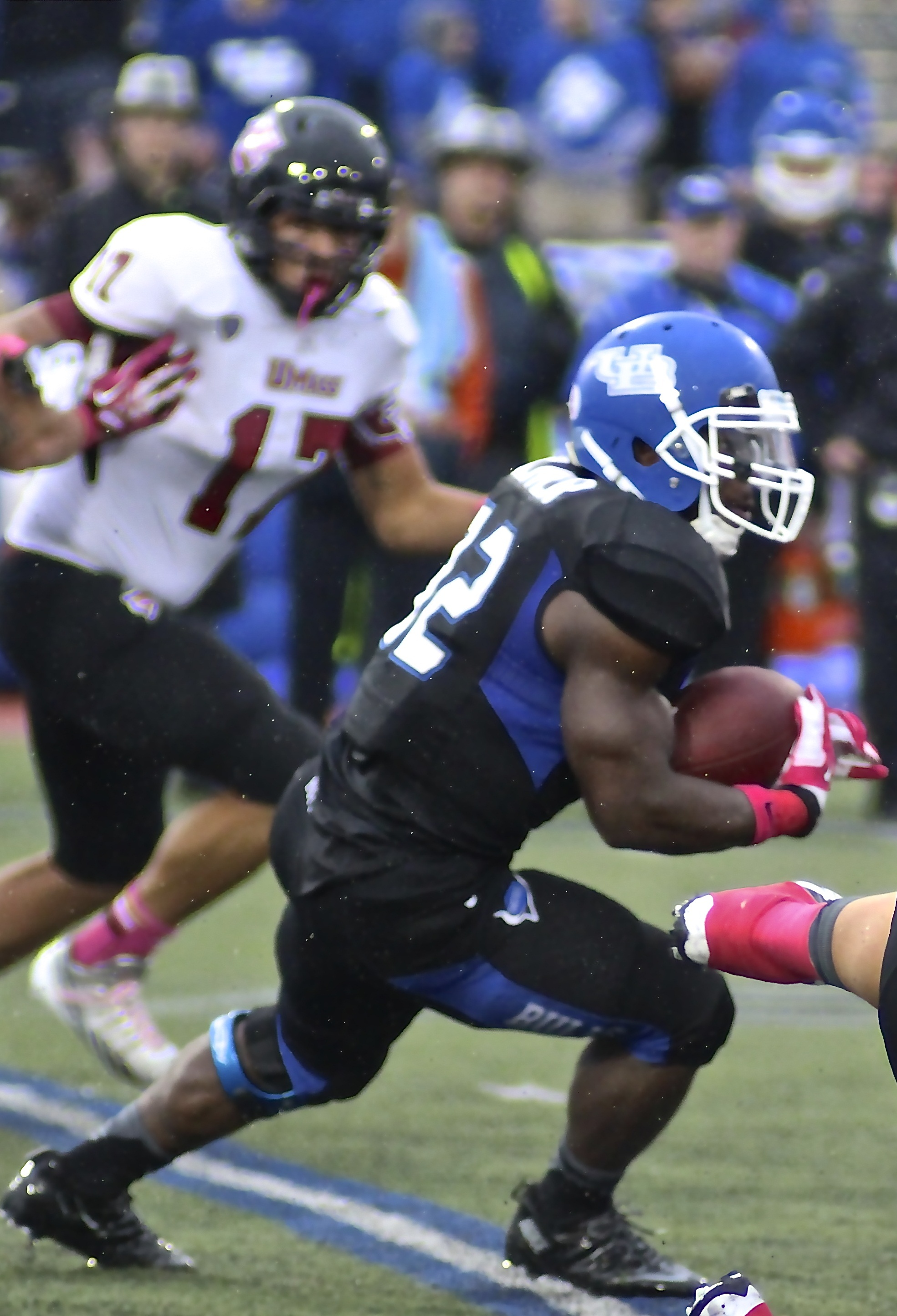
Branden Oliver carries the ball on October 19, 2013

In their seventh game of the season, the Bulls won, 32–3 over the Massachusetts Minutemen.

Scoring summary

| Quarter | Time | Drive | | | Team | Scoring information | Score | |
| Quarter | Time | Plays | Yards | TOP | Team | Scoring information | Massachusetts | Buffalo |
|---|---|---|---|---|---|---|---|---|
| 2 | 14:55 | 5 | 21 | 1:54 | Buffalo | 44-yard field goal by Patrick Clarke | 0 | 3 |
| 2 | 10:13 | | | | Buffalo | Interception returned 35 yards for touchdown by Khalil Mack, Patrick Clarke kick good | 0 | 10 |
| 2 | 0:48 | 13 | 63 | 5:34 | Buffalo | 36-yard field goal by Patrick Clarke | 0 | 13 |
| 2 | 0:07 | 5 | 36 | 0:32 | Massachusetts | 42-yard field goal by Blake Lucas | 3 | 13 |
| 3 | 12:11 | 7 | 45 | 1:49 | Buffalo | 27-yard field goal by Patrick Clarke | 3 | 16 |
| 3 | 0:23 | 1 | 1 | | Buffalo | Jamal Wilson tackled in end zone for a safety by Okoye Houston | 3 | 18 |
| 4 | 13:29 | 5 | 56 | 1:46 | Buffalo | Fred Lee 7-yard touchdown reception from Joe Licata, Patrick Clarke kick good | 3 | 25 |
| 4 | 5:18 | 10 | 67 | 5:21 | Buffalo | Branden Oliver 5-yard touchdown run, Patrick Clarke kick good | 3 | 32 |
| "TOP" = time of possession. For other American football terms, see Glossary of American football. | | | | | | | 3 | 32 |

=== @ Kent State ===
Buffalo @ Kent State

| Team | 1 | 2 | 3 | 4 | Total |
|---|---|---|---|---|---|
| • Bulls | 6 | 14 | 14 | 7 | 41 |
| Golden Flashes | 0 | 7 | 7 | 7 | 21 |

- Date: October 26
- Location: Dix Stadium
  Kent, OH
- Game start: 3:30 p.m. EDT
- Game attendance: 14,197
- Game weather: Overcast, 45 °F (7 °C)
- Referee: Don Willard
- Television network: TWCS

In their eighth game of the season, the Bulls won, 41–21 over the Kent State Golden Flashes.

Scoring summary

| Quarter | Time | Drive | | | Team | Scoring information | Score | |
| Quarter | Time | Plays | Yards | TOP | Team | Scoring information | Buffalo | Kent State |
|---|---|---|---|---|---|---|---|---|
| 1 | 3:02 | 13 | 80 | 6:00 | Buffalo | Alex Neutz 8-yard touchdown reception from Joe Licata, Patrick Clarke kick blocked | 6 | 0 |
| 2 | 14:27 | 9 | 70 | 3:32 | Kent State | Trayion Durham 5-yard touchdown run, Brad Miller kick good | 6 | 7 |
| 2 | 13:04 | 4 | 66 | 1:19 | Buffalo | Branden Oliver 5-yard touchdown run, Patrick Clarke kick good | 13 | 7 |
| 2 | 0:08 | 4 | 46 | 0:29 | Buffalo | Branden Oliver 17-yard touchdown run, Patrick Clarke kick good | 20 | 7 |
| 3 | 7:03 | 3 | 65 | 1:11 | Buffalo | Branden Oliver 38-yard touchdown run, Patrick Clarke kick good | 27 | 7 |
| 3 | 4:55 | 3 | 12 | 1:18 | Buffalo | Branden Oliver 4-yard touchdown run, Patrick Clarke kick good | 34 | 7 |
| 3 | 3:19 | 4 | 52 | 1:28 | Kent State | Dri Archer 17-yard touchdown run, Brad Miller kick good | 34 | 14 |
| 4 | 12:58 | 9 | 80 | 2:57 | Buffalo | Tyshon Goode 18-yard touchdown reception from Colin Reardon, Brad Miller kick good | 34 | 21 |
| 4 | 12:09 | 2 | 39 | 0:39 | Buffalo | Devon Hughes 30-yard touchdown reception from Joe Licata, Patrick Clarke kick good | 41 | 21 |
| "TOP" = time of possession. For other American football terms, see Glossary of American football. | | | | | | | 41 | 21 |

=== Ohio ===
Ohio @ Buffalo

| Team | 1 | 2 | 3 | 4 | Total |
|---|---|---|---|---|---|
| Bobcats | 0 | 3 | 0 | 0 | 3 |
| • Bulls | 0 | 7 | 16 | 7 | 30 |

- Date: November 5
- Location: UB Stadium
  Amherst, NY
- Game start: 8:00 p.m. EST
- Game attendance: 22,918
- Game weather: Cloudy, 49 °F (9 °C)
- Referee: Tom McCabe
- Television network: ESPN2

In their ninth game of the season, the Bulls won, 30–3 over the Ohio Bobcats.

Scoring summary

| Quarter | Time | Drive | | | Team | Scoring information | Score | |
| Quarter | Time | Plays | Yards | TOP | Team | Scoring information | Ohio | Buffalo |
|---|---|---|---|---|---|---|---|---|
| 2 | 12:24 | 6 | 72 | 2:27 | Buffalo | Branden Oliver 2-yard touchdown run, Patrick Clarke kick good | 0 | 7 |
| 2 | 0:37 | 13 | 39 | 4:21 | Ohio | 23-yard field goal by Josiah Yazdani | 3 | 7 |
| 3 | 13:49 | 1 | | | Buffalo | Tyler Tettleton called for intentional grounding in the endzone for a safety | 3 | 9 |
| 3 | 9:40 | 8 | 46 | 4:01 | Buffalo | Branden Oliver 13-yard touchdown run, Patrick Clarke kick good | 3 | 16 |
| 3 | 3:55 | 7 | 71 | 3:10 | Buffalo | Alex Neutz 25-yard touchdown reception from Joe Licata, Patrick Clarke kick good | 3 | 23 |
| 4 | 13:05 | 7 | 75 | 4:02 | Buffalo | Alex Neutz 24-yard touchdown reception from Joe Licata, Patrick Clarke kick good | 3 | 30 |
| "TOP" = time of possession. For other American football terms, see Glossary of American football. | | | | | | | 3 | 30 |

=== @ Toledo ===
Buffalo @ Toledo

| Team | 1 | 2 | 3 | 4 | Total |
|---|---|---|---|---|---|
| Bulls | 0 | 0 | 14 | 27 | 41 |
| • Rockets | 21 | 10 | 7 | 13 | 51 |

- Date: November 12
- Location: Glass Bowl
  Toledo, OH
- Game start: 7:30 p.m. EST
- Game attendance: 15,036
- Game weather: Partly cloudy skies, 31 °F (−1 °C)
- Referee: Stan Evans
- Television network: ESPNU

In their tenth game of the season, the Bulls lost, 51–41 to the Toledo Rockets.

Scoring summary

| Quarter | Time | Drive | | | Team | Scoring information | Score | |
| Quarter | Time | Plays | Yards | TOP | Team | Scoring information | Buffalo | Toledo |
|---|---|---|---|---|---|---|---|---|
| 1 | 12:25 | 3 | 72 | 0:56 | Toledo | Bernard Reedy 59-yard touchdown reception from Terrance Owens, Jeremiah Detmer kick good | 0 | 7 |
| 1 | 6:43 | 9 | 73 | 3:39 | Toledo | Terrance Owens 4-yard touchdown run, Jeremiah Detmer kick good | 0 | 14 |
| 1 | 4:12 | 2 | 60 | 0:19 | Toledo | Damion Jones-Moore 53-yard touchdown run, Jeremiah Detmer kick good | 0 | 21 |
| 2 | 9:51 | 11 | 69 | 4:04 | Toledo | Kareem Hunt 15-yard touchdown run, Jeremiah Detmer kick good | 0 | 28 |
| 2 | 0:00 | 1 | 0 | 0:03 | Toledo | 32-yard field goal by Jeremiah Detmer | 0 | 31 |
| 3 | 14:10 | 2 | 64 | 0:47 | Toledo | Bernard Reedy 56-yard touchdown reception from Terrance Owens, Jeremiah Detmer kick good | 0 | 38 |
| 3 | 13:04 | 5 | 64 | 1:01 | Buffalo | Fred Lee 19-yard touchdown reception from Joe Licata, Patrick Clarke kick good | 7 | 38 |
| 3 | 8:03 | 8 | 90 | 2:53 | Buffalo | Branden Oliver 6-yard touchdown run, Patrick Clarke kick good | 14 | 38 |
| 4 | 11:59 | 9 | 38 | 4:11 | Toledo | 42-yard field goal by Jeremiah Detmer | 14 | 41 |
| 4 | 10:03 | 7 | 72 | 1:52 | Buffalo | Alex Neutz 17-yard touchdown reception from Joe Licata, Patrick Clarke kick good | 21 | 41 |
| 4 | 9:54 | 1 | 44 | 0:07 | Toledo | Ricky Pringle 44-yard touchdown run, Jeremiah Detmer kick good | 21 | 48 |
| 4 | 7:24 | 10 | 71 | 2:24 | Buffalo | Alex Neutz 22-yard touchdown reception from Joe Licata, Patrick Clarke kick good | 28 | 48 |
| 4 | 5:26 | 5 | 53 | 1:55 | Buffalo | Jimmy Gordon 36-yard touchdown reception from Joe Licata, Patrick Clarke kick good | 35 | 48 |
| 4 | 3:00 | 4 | 11 | 2:21 | Toledo | 22-yard field goal by Jeremiah Detmer | 35 | 51 |
| 4 | 0:48 | 12 | 65 | 2:12 | Buffalo | Anthone Taylor 3-yard touchdown run, 2-point pass failed | 41 | 51 |
| "TOP" = time of possession. For other American football terms, see Glossary of American football. | | | | | | | 41 | 51 |

=== @ Miami (OH) ===
Buffalo @ Miami (OH)

| Team | 1 | 2 | 3 | 4 | Total |
|---|---|---|---|---|---|
| • Bulls | 0 | 28 | 3 | 13 | 44 |
| RedHawks | 0 | 0 | 0 | 7 | 7 |

- Date: November 19
- Location: Yager Stadium
  Oxford, OH
- Game start: 8:00 p.m. EST
- Game attendance: 9,895
- Game weather: Partly cloudy, 35 °F (2 °C)
- Referee: Don Willard
- Television network: ESPNU

In their eleventh game of the season, the Bulls won, 44–7 over the Miami RedHawks.

Scoring summary

| Quarter | Time | Drive | | | Team | Scoring information | Score | |
| Quarter | Time | Plays | Yards | TOP | Team | Scoring information | Buffalo | Miami (OH) |
|---|---|---|---|---|---|---|---|---|
| 2 | 14:20 | 6 | 45 | 2:45 | Buffalo | Alex Dennison 1-yard touchdown reception from Joe Licata, Patrick Clarke kick good | 7 | 0 |
| 2 | 8:44 | 10 | 71 | 3:43 | Buffalo | Branden Oliver 1-yard touchdown run, Patrick Clarke kick good | 14 | 0 |
| 2 | 5:55 | 6 | 52 | 1:57 | Buffalo | Branden Oliver 10-yard touchdown run, Patrick Clarke kick good | 21 | 0 |
| 2 | 0:54 | | | | Buffalo | Fumble recovery returned 60 yards for touchdown by Okoye Houston, Patrick Clarke kick good | 28 | 0 |
| 3 | 9:03 | 8 | 53 | 2:48 | Buffalo | 22-yard field goal by Patrick Clarke | 31 | 0 |
| 4 | 13:28 | 11 | 58 | 3:44 | Buffalo | 28-yard field goal by Patrick Clarke | 34 | 0 |
| 4 | 11:08 | 4 | 5 | 1:32 | Buffalo | 38-yard field goal by Patrick Clarke | 37 | 0 |
| 4 | 4:36 | 10 | 48 | 4:01 | Buffalo | Devon Hughes 11-yard touchdown reception from Tony Daniel, Patrick Clarke kick good | 44 | 0 |
| 4 | 3:04 | 4 | 71 | 1:32 | Miami (OH) | Drew Kummer 2-yard touchdown run, Kaleb Patterson kick good | 44 | 7 |
| "TOP" = time of possession. For other American football terms, see Glossary of American football. | | | | | | | 44 | 7 |

=== Bowling Green ===
Bowling Green @ Buffalo

| Team | 1 | 2 | 3 | 4 | Total |
|---|---|---|---|---|---|
| • Falcons | 3 | 0 | 14 | 7 | 24 |
| Bulls | 0 | 7 | 0 | 0 | 7 |

- Date: November 29
- Location: Ralph Wilson Stadium
  Orchard Park, NY
- Game start: 1:30 p.m. EST
- Game attendance: 26,226
- Game weather: Partly cloudy, 32 °F (0 °C)
- Referee: Ron Snodgrass
- Television network: ESPNU

In their twelfth game of the season, the Bulls lost, 24–7 to the Bowling Green Falcons. The game was promoted as the "Clash at the Ralph," returning college football to the 70,000+ seat Ralph Wilson Stadium for the first time since the 1970s. (The stadium was nowhere near filled to capacity, but ticket sales were roughly on par with the Bulls' games at UB Stadium.) Had the Bulls won this game, they would have qualified for the MAC Championship Game.

Scoring summary

| Quarter | Time | Drive | | | Team | Scoring information | Score | |
| Quarter | Time | Plays | Yards | TOP | Team | Scoring information | Bowling Green | Buffalo |
|---|---|---|---|---|---|---|---|---|
| 1 | 4:52 | 6 | 41 | 2:17 | Bowling Green | 40-yard field goal by Tyler Tate | 3 | 0 |
| 2 | 7:13 | 9 | 66 | 3:19 | Buffalo | Branden Oliver 2-yard touchdown run, Patrick Clarke kick good | 3 | 7 |
| 3 | 8:07 | 6 | 71 | 2:00 | Bowling Green | Shaun Joplin 23-yard touchdown reception from Matt Johnson, Tyler Tate kick good | 10 | 7 |
| 3 | 2:05 | 7 | 93 | 4:23 | Bowling Green | Travis Greene 14-yard touchdown run, Tyler Tate kick good | 17 | 7 |
| 4 | 8:18 | 7 | 81 | 3:04 | Bowling Green | Matt Johnson 7-yard touchdown run, Tyler Tate kick good | 24 | 7 |
| "TOP" = time of possession. For other American football terms, see Glossary of American football. | | | | | | | 24 | 7 |

=== San Diego State—Famous Idaho Potato Bowl ===
Buffalo vs. San Diego State

| Team | 1 | 2 | 3 | 4 | Total |
|---|---|---|---|---|---|
| Bulls | 0 | 10 | 0 | 14 | 24 |
| • Aztecs | 7 | 21 | 14 | 7 | 49 |

- Date: December 21
- Location: Bronco Stadium
  Boise, ID
- Game start: 5:30 p.m. EST
- Game attendance: 21,951
- Game weather: Sunny, 30 °F (−1 °C)
- Referee: Jeff Hilyer
- Television network: ESPN

In their thirteenth game of the season, the Bulls lost, 49–24 to the San Diego State Aztecs in the 2013 Famous Idaho Potato Bowl in Boise, Idaho.

Scoring summary

| Quarter | Time | Drive | | | Team | Scoring information | Score | |
| Quarter | Time | Plays | Yards | TOP | Team | Scoring information | Buffalo | San Diego State |
|---|---|---|---|---|---|---|---|---|
| 1 | 0:21 | 4 | 55 | 1:06 | San Diego State | Quinn Kaehler 29-yard touchdown run, Wes Feer kick good | 0 | 7 |
| 2 | 11:55 | 6 | 30 | 2:49 | San Diego State | Adam Muema 3-yard touchdown run, Wes Feer kick good | 0 | 14 |
| 2 | 7:51 | 10 | 75 | 4:04 | Buffalo | Branden Oliver 10-yard touchdown reception from Joe Licata, Patrick Clarke kick good | 7 | 14 |
| 2 | 4:01 | 6 | 25 | 2:40 | Buffalo | 38-yard field goal by Patrick Clarke | 10 | 14 |
| 2 | 1:11 | 5 | 67 | 2:50 | San Diego State | Adam Muema 8-yard touchdown run, Wes Feer kick good | 10 | 21 |
| 2 | 0:38 | 1 | 25 | 0:07 | San Diego State | Dylan Denso 25-yard touchdown reception from Quinn Kaehler, Wes Feer kick good | 10 | 28 |
| 3 | 13:28 | 5 | 26 | 1:23 | San Diego State | Adam Roberts 11-yard touchdown reception from Quinn Kaehler, Wes Feer kick good | 10 | 35 |
| 3 | 8:18 | 9 | 62 | 4:19 | San Diego State | Chad Young 1-yard touchdown run, Wes Feer kick good | 10 | 42 |
| 4 | 14:53 | 7 | 73 | 2:20 | Buffalo | Alex Neutz 23-yard touchdown reception from Joe Licata, Patrick Clarke kick good | 17 | 42 |
| 4 | 6:40 | 2 | 43 | 0:46 | San Diego State | Adam Muema 30-yard touchdown run, Wes Feer kick good | 17 | 49 |
| 4 | 0:36 | 14 | 75 | 6:04 | Buffalo | Fred Lee 10-yard touchdown reception from Joe Licata, Patrick Clarke kick good | 24 | 49 |
| "TOP" = time of possession. For other American football terms, see Glossary of American football. | | | | | | | 24 | 49 |

== After the season ==
=== NFL draft ===
The following Bull was selected in the 2014 NFL draft following the season.

| Round | Pick | Player | Position | NFL club |
|---|---|---|---|---|
| 1 | 5 | Khalil Mack | Linebacker | Oakland Raiders |
