= Cazenovia Park Hockey Association =

Youth hockey organization in New York, US

The Cazenovia Park Youth Hockey Association is a youth hockey organization in South Buffalo, New York. Its teams are named the Cazenovia Chiefs. It offers youth hockey for players ages 4–18. It houses its own "house league" at the mite level, made up of 5 or 6 teams that exclusively play each other and are named after NHL teams (i.e. the Sabres, Blackhawks, etc.). A player is eligible for novice his or her first year at age 4. Mites is for ages 5–8, Squirts is for ages 9–10, Peewees for 11–12, Bantam for 13–14, and Midget for ages 15–18. Each level after mites offers MOHL team(s), which play in different rinks but are not considered "travel teams". Each level other than novice also offers travel teams on a "major, minor" system.

== Building ==
The CPYHA is housed in Timothy J. Burvid Ice Rink in South Buffalo, New York. It was previously an outdoor rink, but the current building was constructed around the rink in the 1970s. In the past, the rink has hosted State Championships at various age levels, as well as the occasional appearance by a current Buffalo Sabres player to sign autographs and skate with fans. These appearances have included Steve Shields and Brian Holzinger, among others. In addition, Sabres alumni events have been held at the rink, as well as Sabres practices. The rink is open year-round, but closes every other year for a period in the summer for maintenance.

== Uniforms ==
All Cazenovia uniforms other than those of Mite House teams are a Chicago Blackhawks template with Cazenovia's unique logo on the front.

== Notable alumni ==
- Patrick Kane – #1 overall draft pick in the 2007 NHL draft to the Chicago Blackhawks. Won the Calder Memorial Trophy as the league's top rookie for the 2007–2008 season. Scored the game-winning goal in game 6 of the 2010 Stanley Cup Finals to clinch the Cup for the Blackhawks.

See a more comprehensive list of Kane's achievements.

- Peter Ratchuk – Former NHL defenseman for the Florida Panthers, originally drafted by the Colorado Avalanche.
- Tim Kennedy – NHL draft pick of the Washington Capitals, former player for Michigan State and the Buffalo Sabres. Currently playing for the Florida Panthers. He made his NHL debut with the Sabres on December 27, 2008.
- Michael Ratchuk – younger brother of Peter Ratchuk, NHL draft pick of the Philadelphia Flyers, former player at Michigan State and current player on the Syracuse Crunch, AHL affiliate of the Columbus Blue Jackets.

== Trivia ==
The Zamboni currently used at TJB ice rink was formerly used at Buffalo Memorial Auditorium during Buffalo Sabres games.
