= Erik Bohen =

American politician (born 1982)

Erik T. Bohen

Member of the Buffalo Public Schools Board of Education from the South district
- Incumbent
- Assumed office January 5, 2026
- Preceded by: Theresa Schuta

Member of the New York State Assembly from the 142nd district
- In office April 30, 2018 – January 1, 2019
- Preceded by: Mickey Kearns
- Succeeded by: Patrick B. Burke

Personal details
- Born: July 26, 1982 (age 44) Buffalo, New York, U.S.
- Party: Independent Democrat (2018–present)
- Other political affiliations: Democratic (until 2018); Republican (electorally)
- Education: St. Bonaventure University; Canisius College; Erie Community College
- Occupation: Teacher, politician

Erik T. Bohen (born July 26, 1982) is an American politician. A former member of the New York State Assembly, he represented the 142nd district; this district includes South Buffalo, the City of Lackawanna, and the towns of West Seneca and Orchard Park. Bohen was elected to the Assembly in an April 24, 2018, special election, but was defeated in his bid for a full term on November 6, 2018. He is notable for having won election to the Assembly on the Republican line despite being an enrolled Democrat.

== Early career ==
Bohen has worked in the Buffalo Public Schools as a special education teacher. He was the campaign manager for Carl Paladino's two successful school board campaigns. He has been active in numerous South Buffalo charities and organizations, including the Ryan Purcell Foundation. His father, Billy, was the longtime business agent for the local ironworkers union.

== State Assembly ==
In 2018, after Mickey Kearns had stepped down from the Assembly to become Erie County Clerk, Bohen announced that he would seek Kearns's vacated seat in District 142; Bohen indicated that he was running as a conservative Democrat. The Erie County Democratic Committee denied Bohen its endorsement and instead gave it to Erie County Legislator Patrick B. Burke, the legislator who sponsored the county's ban on conversion therapy. The Erie County Republican Committee and its chairman, Nicholas A. Langworthy, endorsed Bohen and gave him operational support. In an April 24, 2018, special election, Bohen defeated Burke; he received 52% of the vote to Burke's 48% in a race in which less than 15% of eligible voters participated.

Bohen planned to caucus with the Democrats in the Assembly. However, Democratic Assembly Speaker Carl Heastie stated that before Bohen could join that caucus, he would have to "prove" that he was a "true Democrat". Based on Bohen's outspoken support for Heastie, Republican Assembly Minority Leader Brian Kolb did not invite Bohen to join the Republican caucus. These two actions left Bohen as the only member of the Assembly without a home caucus.

Bohen announced his intention to run for a full term in the November 2018 general election. He issued a press release stating that he could not "align himself" with Andrew Cuomo or the Democratic Party, and would run once more on the Republican line. Bohen lost his bid for election to a full term in a November 6, 2018, general election. He was defeated by his special election opponent, Patrick Burke.

== Buffalo School Board ==
In 2025, Bohen announced that he was running for the Park district position on the Buffalo Public Schools Board of Education. The Park district consists of South Buffalo. He ran unopposed, winning on Election Day in 2025.

In 2026, Bohen introduced legislation to change the name of the district he represents on the school board from the "Park district" to the "South district." This was unanimously passed by the Buffalo School Board in February.
