= Michael P. Kearns =

New York politician

Mickey Kearns
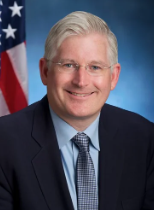

County Clerk of Erie County
- Incumbent
- Assumed office December 5, 2017
- Deputy: Kevin M. Linder
- Preceded by: Chris Jacobs

Member of the New York State Assembly from the 142nd district 145th district (2012)
- In office March 21, 2012 – December 4, 2017
- Preceded by: Mark J.F. Schroeder
- Succeeded by: Erik Bohen

Member of the Buffalo Common Council from the South District
- In office January 2006 – March 2012
- Preceded by: Jeffrey M. Conrad
- Succeeded by: Christopher Scanlon

Personal details
- Born: May 1969 (age 57) Buffalo, New York, U.S.
- Party: Democratic
- Other political affiliations: Republican (electorally)
- Spouse: Stephanie
- Children: 2
- Education: Erie Community College; Canisius College

Michael P. "Mickey" Kearns is an American politician who served as Clerk of Erie County, New York from 2017 to 2026. Kearns served on the New York State Assembly from 2012 to 2017 representing the 142nd District, which spans South Buffalo, half of the city of Lackawanna, West Seneca and Orchard Park; he has also served on the Buffalo Common Council. Kearns was elected Erie County Clerk in a 2017 special election, and he was re-elected to the position twice, in 2018 and 2022. Steve Meyer unseated Kearns as County Clerk in the 2026 midterm election.

== Early career ==
Prior to his election to the Assembly, Kearns served as South Buffalo's representative on the Buffalo Common Council, where he was elected to succeed Jeffrey M. Conrad. Kearns unsuccessfully challenged incumbent Buffalo Mayor Byron Brown in a Democratic primary in the 2009 Buffalo mayoral election.

== State Assembly ==
Kearns is a registered Democrat. He ran for Assembly in a March 2012 special election without the Democrats' support on the lines of the Republican and Independence Parties. He was elected in a special election on March 20, 2012, defeating Chris Fahey, the endorsed Democrat. While he stated his intention to caucus with the Democrats, Kearns also stated that he would not support Speaker Sheldon Silver; this stance mirrored the position taken by Kearns's predecessor, Mark J. F. Schroeder. On May 20, 2013, Kearns left the Assembly Democratic Conference and called for Silver to resign from his post as Speaker of the Assembly; Kearns took these steps after Silver's confidential, taxpayer-funded settlement of sexual harassment claims against fellow Assembly Democrat Vito Lopez became public. Following the ouster of Speaker Silver, Kearns rejoined the Assembly Democratic Conference.

While in the Assembly, Kearns pushed for accountability for banks who allow properties that are the subject of abandoned foreclosures to fall into disrepair, and he fought against a bill that allowed the Western New York Children's Psychiatric Center to be closed or relocated.

Kearns resigned his Assembly seat after being elected Erie County Clerk.

== Erie County Clerk ==
Kearns announced his candidacy for Erie County Clerk in mid-2017 against Democratic candidate and former WBEN host Steve Cichon. The position had been vacant since January 2017, when then-Clerk Chris Jacobs resigned the post after being elected the New York State Senate. Kearns ran for County Clerk on the Republican, Conservative, Independence, and Reform Party lines, was elected County Clerk in November 2017, and was sworn in on December 5, 2017. Kearns won re-election to the position of Erie County Clerk in 2018 and 2022.

As Erie County Clerk, Kearns refurbished local DMV locations with better technology implementation, new chairs, and more spacious interiors. Additionally, there are mobile DMV services that reach additional areas three days a week. Kearns also pushed for legislation Erie County's Tax Delinquency penalty from 18% to 12% to limit the number of houses with large amounts of unpaid taxes. Kearns urged the State of New York to delay the January 31 recertification deadline for pistol permit holders who obtained their permits before January 2013, arguing that "We should not be making law-abiding citizens into criminals based on them not re-certifying."

Steve Meyer, a trustee of Williamsville, New York, challenged Kearns as the Democratic candidate for Erie County Clerk in the 2026 midterm elections. Meyer received about 51.4% of the vote, winning the position and unseating Kearns.

Civic offices
Preceded by Chris Jacobs	County Clerk of Erie County; 2017 – 2026	Succeeded by Steve Meyer
Political offices
Preceded by Jeffrey M. Conrad	Buffalo Common Council Member, South District; 2005 – March 2012	Succeeded by Christopher P. Scanlon
New York State Assembly
Vacant Title last held by Mark J. F. Schroeder	New York State Assembly, 145th District; April 2012 – December 31, 2012	Succeeded by John D. Ceretto
Preceded by Jane L. Corwin	New York State Assembly, 142nd District; January 1, 2013 – December 4, 2017	Succeeded by Erik Bohen
