= South Buffalo, Buffalo =

South Buffalo
- Neighborhood
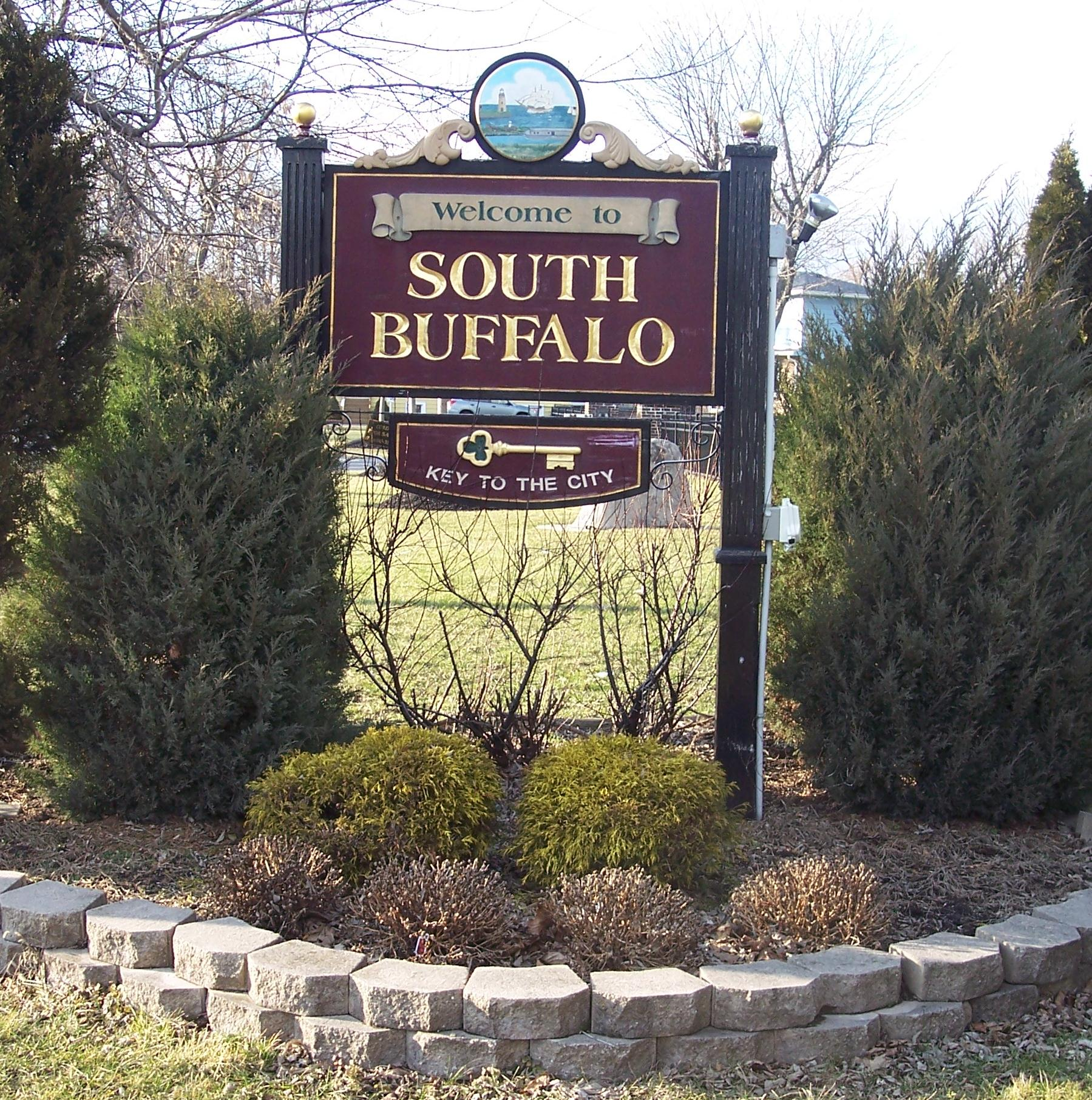
- Interactive map of South Buffalo
- Coordinates: 42.847°N 78.824°W
- Country: United States
- State: New York
- County: Erie

Population (2010)
  - Total: 42,717
- Time zone: Eastern (EST)
- ZIP Code: 14210, 14220
- Area code: 716

South Buffalo is a neighborhood that makes up the southern third of the City of Buffalo, New York. Traditionally known for its large Irish-American community, this community also has a strong presence of various other nationalities. The once-heavily industrialized district was home to many steel mills, automotive parts manufacturers, petroleum refineries, foundries, and machine shops. However, due to increasing deindustrialization and rising unemployment, the area has experienced growing problems with poverty and population decline.

South Buffalo, as officially designated by the Buffalo City Council, is bordered by the town of West Seneca on the east, the City of Lackawanna on the south, Lake Erie on its western edge, and the Buffalo River on its northern border. New York State Route 16 (Seneca Street), Abbott Road, and South Park Avenue are the major streets serving South Buffalo.

== Neighborhoods and schools ==
South Buffalo has various educational institutions, including public elementary and high schools, elementary charter schools, and Catholic elementary and high schools. Trocaire College is located on Abbott Road and has another campus on Seneca Street in South Buffalo.

Recently, the South Buffalo Catholic Schools have consolidated to form one school, called South Buffalo Catholic School located on Abbott Road. The school struggled financially because of the high cost associated with operating private education, and the 2008-2009 school year closed with a $340,000 operating deficit; as a result, two of its campuses in South Buffalo closed.

Public Schools in South Buffalo include Hillary Park Academy, Southside Elementary, Lorraine Academy, and many charter schools. South Park High School is the neighborhood's only public secondary school. The two remaining Catholic high schools in South Buffalo are Bishop Timon - St. Jude High School for boys and Mount Mercy Academy for girls.

The South Buffalo area is also served by two libraries. The Dudley Branch of the Erie County Library System is located at 2010 South Park Avenue. The Cazenovia Library functions as an independent library and community resource center and is located at 155 Cazenovia Street.

== Society ==
South Buffalo has one of the highest concentrations of Irish Americans west of the Hudson River outside of Chicago, many of whom settled in Buffalo after the completion of the Erie Canal, as well as the coming of the railroads and the Industrial Revolution later in the nineteenth century. Nevertheless, unlike many other American cities with large Irish-American populations, Buffalo's southside Irish came to the United States relatively late. By far the largest concentrations came from the Irish counties of Clare, Cork, Mayo and Wexford. A large percentage of South Buffalonians can trace their Irish ancestry to the area in and around the town of Kilrush in County Clare. Indeed, most were post-famine arrivals who were recruited to work the burgeoning steel mills, petroleum refineries, foundries, flour mills, automobile factories, and machine shops sprouting up in this highly industrialized city. Many more of South Buffalo's Irish would wind up working in the ranks of the protective services for the Buffalo Police Department and Buffalo Fire Department. Others found jobs in the various unionized building trades, such as in the labor unions representing the carpenters, bricklayers, iron workers, and operating engineers.

Youth ice hockey is hugely supported in South Buffalo. The Cazenovia Chiefs hockey program provides recreation for hundreds of children in the neighborhood. This program has produced such hockey talent as Patrick Kane. The neighborhood plays host to the Goin' South Irish Feis every year, an event that is extremely popular. It features food, fireworks, and live music, including Crikwater and Jackdaw, and a number of local Celtic bands. Another popular event which takes place is the annual Seneca Street Car Show, which draws many people into South Buffalo.

Several traditional Irish Dance Academies operate in the neighborhood of South Buffalo, such as Rince Na Tiarna, and Clann Na Cara.

In addition to the Irish ethnic population, there are also communities of English, Italian, German, Polish, and Puerto Rican elements in the population of South Buffalo.

The area is served by newspapers, publications and websites including The South Buffalo News put out by the Front Page Group, The Greater South Buffalo Chamber of Commerce newsletter, and the South Buffalo & Southtowns Online news website.

== Politics ==
As of 2024, South Buffalo is represented by Pat Burke in the New York State Assembly, Michael "Mickey" Kearns as Erie County Clerk, a vacant seat in the New York State Senate, and Tim Kennedy in the United States House of Representatives. The South District seat of the Buffalo Common Council is currently vacant, and Theresa Schuta represents South Buffalo on the Buffalo Public Schools board of education.

Some South Buffalonians who are involved in politics favor the Democratic Party, but many lean more socially (and sometimes fiscally) conservative than the party as a whole, typical of most working-class Roman Catholic communities. Former Assemblyman Mark J. F. Schroeder, for instance, was the only Democrat in the Assembly to not support longtime speaker Sheldon Silver, a stance initially mirrored by Kearns. One of South Buffalo's most famous politicians, James D. Griffin, served as mayor of Buffalo for 16 years and was noted for both his fiscal and social conservatism, to the point where the Republican and Conservative parties frequently cross-endorsed him. Current Democratic mayor Christopher Scanlon, a South Buffalo native, is also notably conservative. Carl Paladino, a former school board member and gubernatorial candidate, was a registered Democrat from 1974 to 2005, but he changed his registration to Republican and ran on that party's line in the 2010 New York gubernatorial election.

== Geography ==
Within South Buffalo are two parks designed by Frederick Law Olmsted. These parks, Cazenovia and South Park, were connected by wide elm-lined streets. McKinley Parkway and Red Jacket Parkway are two of the remaining parkways that created a greenway throughout the city in the early 1900s.

Cazenovia Park is the larger of the two parks. It contains two baseball and two softball diamonds. The baseball diamonds and one softball diamond reside in an area aptly referred to as the "Bowl". The second softball diamond is situated a little further away and called the "Hidden Diamond". The park also contains a nine-hole golf course, a wading pool, playground, basketball and tennis courts, three soccer fields, as well as a casino, typical of the era when the park was designed. The road running through the park was named after South Park High School Alumni Warren Spahn in 2004.

South Park is located along the border of Lackawanna. It also contains a nine-hole golf course, as well as two softball diamonds. The Buffalo and Erie County Botanical Gardens is also in the park. It is a favorite summer time habitat for Canada geese.

Hillery Playground, located in the Seneca Street neighborhood, is a main recreational area for the residents of the Seneca Street area of South Buffalo.

In addition, there are numerous fishing spots on the waterfront such as the Small Boat Harbor, Gallagher Beach, and Union Ship Canal on the Lackawanna border.

The South Buffalo area is serviced by the Niagara Frontier Transportation Authority buses on Seneca St. (No. 15), Abbott Rd. (No. 14), and South Park Ave. (No. 16).

== Past and present ==
During the 1940s and 1950s swimming was a favorite summer pastime at the two outdoor swimming pools in Cazenovia Park. The two pools have since been removed, and replaced with one indoor pool, used year-round. Fishing in Cazenovia Creek was an alternative summertime activity. In the winter, a lagoon off of the creek provided ice skating, but this has also been removed.

A game called chestnuts was a popular activity during this time period in South Buffalo. Horse chestnuts would be suspended from a string, usually a shoelace, run through a hole drilled in the center. Participants would take turns holding their suspended chestnut, while their opponent would snap their chestnut against it. When either chestnut cracked the surviving chestnut would be crowned a kinger. Kingships would accumulate from game to game. Any accumulated kingships of a defeated chestnut would be transferred to the victor.

Community picnics at Cazenovia Park and at Crystal Beach Park in Crystal Beach, Ontario were provided annually by the Tri-Abbot Southpark Businessmen's Association.

Baseball was and still remains another dominant sport in the area. In the past there wasn’t an established little league, except for the P.A.L (i.e Police Athletic League), but games would be played spontaneously almost anywhere, including playground ball fields, vacant lots and even the street. Teams would be formed by alternate selection until everyone present was chosen by one team or the other. The team captain to make the first choice was determined by tossing a bat with the handle up to one captain, who would grab it in one hand. Each captain would alternately place a hand on the top of the others hand until there was no more room on the bat. The last hand determined the first choice.

The area is represented by the South Buffalo Celtics in amateur American football. The Celtics won the 2011 Mid Continental Football League championship in October 2011.

Two neighborhood movie houses, the Capitol and Shea's Seneca shows, provided entertainment at very reasonable prices. Saturday matinees were 14¢ for the Capitol and 20¢ for the Seneca. The Strand also provided motion picture entertainment.

Spoonley The Trainman on Choate was a major attraction in South Buffalo. This toy train shop, owned and operated by Chester Spoonley, drew people from western New York to experience the layouts featuring Lionel and American Flyer trains and accessories.

Although the two steel companies, Bethlehem and Republic, provided employment for a majority of South Buffalo residents during this time, they were also a major source of air pollution. The blast furnaces and open hearth furnaces generated huge quantities of airborne particulates that coated every surface inside and outside of homes and buildings. This fact was not fully appreciated by the residents until the steel mills shut down and suddenly surfaces remained relatively clean.

The South Buffalo area suffered in the late 1970s and early 1980s due to the closing of the majority of steel mills, machine shops, automobile factories, oil refineries and flour milling plants which were either within or bordering the community. In search of jobs many of the residents were forced to leave Western New York and seek employment out of state. The numerous independent small shops which once lined Seneca Street and South Park Avenue suffered most from the economic downturn caused by the many plant closures. What was once the South Buffalo neighborhood's main retail area became a collection of boarded-up store fronts hard pressed for cash flow. Suffering less were the more middle-class neighborhoods of South Buffalo which border McKinley Parkway, Abbott Road and Potter Road.

The annual Valley St. Patrick's Day Parade was revived some 20 years ago and serves as a more traditional celebration over the City of Buffalo's main St. Patrick's Day Parade held usually the following day in Buffalo's city center on Delaware Avenue. The Grand Marshals of this less formal event have represented a gamut from some of South Buffalo's best known Irish-American families.

Each year, starting in 2004, the Moe Talty-Franz walk for breast cancer awareness and fund raising is conducted in Cazenovia Park. Hundreds of people come together to support the event.

Another new festival tradition is the South Buffalo Business Expo and Irish Feish, usually held the first weekend of September in Cazenovia Park. A day long event featuring local businesses, services, food, dance and music draws residents from all over.

Another favorite is the Labor Day parade, where union members from all over Western New York proudly march from the Irish Center to the Casino in Cazenovia Park. A Mass of thanksgiving is celebrated at the shrine of St. Joseph the Worker on the grounds of St. Thomas Aquinas Church. The shrine was erected by Msgr. John P. Boland, known as the "Labor Priest." Msgr. Boland was noted for his contributions to the New York State Little Wagner Act. The parade and Mass are followed by a picnic in Caz Park.

Famous natives include political activist and property developer Carl Paladino, who moved from the Lovejoy District to South Buffalo during high school; Tim Russert from NBC's Meet the Press; James T. Molloy, the former Doorkeeper of the House of Representatives; Jim Kelley, the internationally known hockey writer; and Dan Neaverth, a longtime Buffalo radio broadcaster from the 1950s to the present who was inducted into Buffalo Broadcasting Hall of Fame in 2000. Dan attended Timon H.S. in South Buffalo.

== See also ==
- Neighborhoods of Buffalo, New York
