= 2009 Eastern Michigan Eagles football team =

American college football season

2009 Eastern Michigan Eagles football
- Conference: Mid-American Conference
- West
- Record: 0–12 (0–8 MAC)
- Head coach: Ron English (1st season)
- Offensive coordinator: Ken Karcher (1st season)
- Offensive scheme: Multiple
- Defensive coordinator: Eric Lewis (1st season)
- Base defense: 4–3
- Home stadium: Rynearson Stadium

2009 Mid-American Conference football standings
	Conf.			Overall
Team	W		L	W		L
East Division
Ohio xy	7	–	1	9	–	5
Temple x	7	–	1	9	–	4
Bowling Green	6	–	2	7	–	6
Kent State	4	–	4	5	–	7
Buffalo	3	–	5	5	–	7
Akron	2	–	6	3	–	9
Miami (OH)	1	–	7	1	–	11
West Division
No. 23 Central Michigan x$	8	–	0	12	–	2
Northern Illinois	5	–	3	7	–	6
Western Michigan	4	–	4	5	–	7
Toledo	3	–	5	5	–	7
Ball State	2	–	6	2	–	10
Eastern Michigan	0	–	8	0	–	12
Championship: Central Michigan 20, Ohio 10
$ – Conference champion; x – Division champion/co-champions; y – Championship game participant; Rankings from AP Poll

The 2009 Eastern Michigan Eagles football team represented Eastern Michigan University in the 2009 NCAA Division I FBS football season. Eastern Michigan competed as a member of the Mid-American Conference (MAC) West Division and played their home games in Rynearson Stadium.

Following the firing of Jeff Genyk during the 2008 season, Eastern Michigan hired Ron English, who had formerly been the defensive coordinator at the University of Michigan and the University of Louisville, as the team's head coach. The coaching change initially brought excitement to the program, as English hired a new staff, including former University of Michigan, New York Giants, and Oakland Raiders running back Tyrone Wheatley, and replaced Genyk's spread offense with a pro-style offense.

However, the change in offense proved difficult for senior quarterback Andy Schmitt, and he was largely ineffective in the first several games of the season. In the second game of the year, the Eagles traveled to Northwestern, and after trailing 21–0 in the second quarter, they tied the game at 24 with 2 minutes left, before Northwestern kicked a game-winning field goal in the closing seconds. The following week, they had another trip just across the county to play Michigan. Similar to their 2006 game at Michigan State, they played a very competitive first half, only trailing by one score. But like many times before, they couldn't put two good halves together. In the second half, the Eagles were outscored 21–0 and Andy Schmitt suffered a season-ending knee injury.

The rest of the season they used former starting quarterback Kyle McMahon, and freshman Alex Gillet. Eastern scored no more than 12 points in any of the next three games, including a 56–8 loss at Central Michigan. The week after that, they nearly beat Ball State who was also winless at the time. The difference was a safety in the fourth quarter. Next, they had one more non-conference game as they traveled to Arkansas. This game was the opposite of the Michigan game — bad first half, good second half. They were down 42–0 before eventually losing 63–27. For the rest of the year, they were only close in the finale at Akron, losing by 7. In previous years, Eastern was able to get at least a few wins because of a high scoring offense. Schmitt's injury ended that, and their defense was among the worst in the nation. Eastern gave up 3,321 rushing yards (276.8 per game), more than any other team in the nation, which was their downfall. They statistically appeared to have one of the best passing defenses, allowing 150.5 passing yards per game, second only to Air Force, but this was mostly an illusion. Everyone knew they couldn't stop the run, so opponents just didn't call many pass plays.

Eastern finished the season without a win, their first winless season since 1981. The Eagles were one of two winless FBS teams (Western Kentucky was the other).

== Recruiting ==
College recruiting (2009)
Name	Hometown	School	Height	Weight	40^{‡}	Commit date
Matthew Boyd; LB	Southfield, MI	Southfield-Lathrup HS	6 ft 1 in (1.85 m)	210 lb (95 kg)	–	Jan 28, 2009
Matthew Boyd; LB	Recruit ratings: Scout: Rivals: (40)					
Melvin Crews; DE	Muskegon, MI	Muskegon HS	6 ft 3 in (1.91 m)	225 lb (102 kg)	–	Jan 22, 2009
Melvin Crews; DE	Recruit ratings: Scout:					
Devon Davis; DE	Columbus, IN	Columbus East HS	6 ft 3 in (1.91 m)	220 lb (100 kg)	–	Aug 13, 2008
Devon Davis; DE	Recruit ratings: Scout: Rivals: (72)					
Javon Gillespie; DB	Washington, DC	Collegiate Academy	6 ft 1 in (1.85 m)	180 lb (82 kg)	–	Feb 4, 2009
Javon Gillespie; DB	Recruit ratings: Rivals: (40)					
Alex Gillett; QB	Clyde, OH	Clyde HS	6 ft 1 in (1.85 m)	183 lb (83 kg)	4.77	Jan 22, 2009
Alex Gillett; QB	Recruit ratings: Scout: Rivals: (40)					
Kelip Goodwin; WR	South Haven, MI	South Haven HS	6 ft 2 in (1.88 m)	185 lb (84 kg)	4.49	Jan 25, 2009
Kelip Goodwin; WR	Recruit ratings: Scout: Rivals: (40)					
Garrett Gronowski; DB	Avon, OH	Avon HS	6 ft 3 in (1.91 m)	202 lb (92 kg)	–	Feb 4, 2009
Garrett Gronowski; DB	Recruit ratings: Scout: Rivals: (40)					
Willie Hickman; DB	Pahokee, FL	Pahokee HS	5 ft 8 in (1.73 m)	139 lb (63 kg)	4.4	Feb 4, 2009
Willie Hickman; DB	Recruit ratings: Scout: Rivals: (74)					
Garrett Hoskins; TE	Grand Rapids, MI	Creston HS	6 ft 3 in (1.91 m)	235 lb (107 kg)	–	Feb 4, 2009
Garrett Hoskins; TE	Recruit ratings: Scout: Rivals: (40)					
Delano Johnson; DE	Visalia, CA	College of the Sequoias	6 ft 5 in (1.96 m)	260 lb (120 kg)	4.65	Feb 4, 2009
Delano Johnson; DE	Recruit ratings: Scout: Rivals:					
Bronley Kashama; DE	Brampton, ON	Brampton Centennial SS	6 ft 4 in (1.93 m)	245 lb (111 kg)	–	Feb 4, 2009
Bronley Kashama; DE	Recruit ratings: Scout: Rivals: (40)					
Ryan Leonard; DT	Visalia, CA	College of the Sequoias	6 ft 1 in (1.85 m)	285 lb (129 kg)	4.9	Feb 4, 2009
Ryan Leonard; DT	Recruit ratings: Scout: Rivals:					
Jonte Lewis; DB	Visalia, CA	College of the Sequoias	6 ft 1 in (1.85 m)	210 lb (95 kg)	–	Feb 4, 2009
Jonte Lewis; DB	Recruit ratings: Scout: Rivals:					
Orlando McCord; DE	Detroit, MI	King HS	6 ft 4 in (1.93 m)	231 lb (105 kg)	4.71	Jan 28, 2009
Orlando McCord; DE	Recruit ratings: Scout: Rivals: (67)					
Darrius Moffett; LB	Chicago, IL	Hubbard HS	6 ft 3 in (1.91 m)	225 lb (102 kg)	–	Feb 4, 2009
Darrius Moffett; LB	Recruit ratings: Scout: Rivals: (72)					
Andy Mulumba; LB	Montreal, PQ	Cegep Du Vieux	6 ft 3 in (1.91 m)	235 lb (107 kg)	–	Feb 4, 2009
Andy Mulumba; LB	Recruit ratings: Scout: Rivals: (40)					
Nick Olds; WR	Columbus, IN	Columbus East HS	6 ft 3 in (1.91 m)	185 lb (84 kg)	–	Jul 23, 2008
Nick Olds; WR	Recruit ratings: Scout: Rivals: (68)					
Nate Paopao; LB	San Marcos, CA	Palomar	6 ft 1 in (1.85 m)	220 lb (100 kg)	–	Feb 4, 2009
Nate Paopao; LB	Recruit ratings: Scout: Rivals:					
Devontae Payne; QB	Cleveland, OH	South HS	6 ft 5 in (1.96 m)	220 lb (100 kg)	–	Feb 4, 2009
Devontae Payne; QB	Recruit ratings: Scout: Rivals: (75)					
Stephan Sewell; LB	Colorado Springs, CO	USAF Academy Prep	6 ft 5 in (1.96 m)	252 lb (114 kg)	–	Feb 4, 2009
Stephan Sewell; LB	Recruit ratings: Scout: Rivals: (40)					
Andrew Sorgatz; OL	Wheaton, IL	Wheaton North HS	6 ft 5 in (1.96 m)	252 lb (114 kg)	–	Feb 4, 2009
Andrew Sorgatz; OL	Recruit ratings: Scout: Rivals: (40)					
Aaron Tanguma; TE	Elsa, TX	Edcouch-Elsa HS	6 ft 4 in (1.93 m)	265 lb (120 kg)	–	Feb 4, 2009
Aaron Tanguma; TE	Recruit ratings: Scout: Rivals: (40)					
Kinsman Thomas; WR	Bennettsville, SC	Marlboro County HS	6 ft 2 in (1.88 m)	193 lb (88 kg)	4.59	Feb 4, 2009
Kinsman Thomas; WR	Recruit ratings: Scout: Rivals: (72)					
Overall recruit ranking: Scout: 111 Rivals: 104
‡ Refers to 40-yard dash; Note: In many cases, Scout, Rivals, 247Sports, On3, and ESPN may conflict in their listings of height, weight and 40 time.; In these cases, the average was taken. ESPN grades are on a 100-point scale.; Sources: "Eastern Michigan Commit List for 2009". Rivals.; "Football Recruiting: Eastern Michigan". Scout.; "Eastern Michigan Football Recruiting 2009". ESPN.; "Scout.com Team Recruiting Rankings". Scout.; "2009 Team Ranking". Rivals.com.

== Schedule ==
Date	Time	Opponent	Site	TV	Result	Attendance
September 5	7:00 p.m.	Army*	Rynearson Stadium; Ypsilanti, Michigan		L 14–27	14,499
September 12	11:00 a.m.	at Northwestern*	Ryan Field; Evanston, Illinois	BTN	L 24–27	19,239
September 19	12:00 p.m.	at No. 25 Michigan*	Michigan Stadium; Ann Arbor, Michigan	BTN	L 17–45	107,903
October 3	1:00 p.m.	Temple^{†}	Rynearson Stadium; Ypsilanti, Michigan		L 12–24	3,364
October 10	12:00 p.m.	at Central Michigan	Kelly/Shorts Stadium; Mount Pleasant, Michigan (rivalry)	ESPN Plus	L 8–56	26,730
October 17	4:00 p.m.	Kent State	Rynearson Stadium; Ypsilanti, Michigan		L 6–28	2,401
October 24	1:00 p.m.	Ball State	Rynearson Stadium; Ypsilanti, Michigan		L 27–29	1,535
October 31	7:00 p.m.	at Arkansas*	Razorback Stadium; Fayetteville, Arkansas	ESPNU	L 27–63	62,501
November 5	6:30 p.m.	at Northern Illinois	Huskie Stadium; DeKalb, Illinois	ESPNU	L 6–50	10,527
November 14	1:00 p.m.	Western Michigan	Rynearson Stadium; Ypsilanti, Michigan (Michigan MAC Trophy)		L 14–35	3,281
November 20	7:00 p.m.	at Toledo	Glass Bowl; Toledo, Ohio		L 21–47	9,967
November 27	2:00 p.m.	at Akron	InfoCision Stadium; Akron, Ohio		L 21–28	9,962
*Non-conference game; ^{†}Homecoming; Rankings from AP Poll released prior to the game; All times are in Eastern time

== Roster ==
As of 2009-07-15
Wide receivers: 1 Kinsman Thomas – freshman; 2 Dontayo Gage – senior; 9 Tyrone Burke – junior; 15 Jacory Stone – senior; 18 DeAnthony White – senior; 24 Corey Manns – (redshirt) freshman; 27 Marvon Sanders – sophomore; 28 Brandon Boyle – freshman; 80 Nick Olds – freshman; 82 Terrance Gourdine – freshman; 84 Trey Hunter – sophomore; 86 L’Shane Bynum – (redshirt) freshman; Offensive line: 55 Stephen Johnson – senior; 60 Andy Fretz – senior; 61 Derek Gotham – sophomore; 63 Mark VanDenburgh – (redshirt) freshman; 65 Dan DeMaster – junior; 68 Korey Neal – (redshirt) freshman; 70 Cory Watman – (redshirt) freshman; 71 Brian Moore – junior; 72 Andrew Sorgatz – freshman; 75 Scott MacLeod – freshman; 76 Bridger Buche – junior; 78 Eric Davis – junior; Tight ends: 81 Ben Thayer – junior; 83 John Bonner – senior; 85 Garrett Hoskins – freshman; 86 Artie Tanguma – freshman; 87 Drew Serruto – sophomore; 88 Sonny Paluch – junior; 89 Josh LeDuc – junior	Quarterbacks: 7 Andy Schmitt – senior; 11 Kyle McMahon – junior; 12 Jason Williams – sophomore; 13 Alex Gillett – freshman; 14 Devontae Payne – freshman; Running backs: 3 Terrence Blevins – senior; 22 Dwayne Priest – junior; 26 Corey Welch – sophomore; 32 Dominique Sherrer – sophomore; 35 Joe Fleming – freshman; Defensive line: 17 Brandon Downs – senior; 56 Ryan Leonard – junior; 59 Matt Price – freshman; 64 Khaled Mheisen – freshman; 69 Shawn Sinawe – freshman; 90 Javon Reese – sophomore; 91 Dan Cordick – junior; 92 Ryan Kuhlman – sophomore; 93 Brad Ohrman – sophomore; 94 Devon Davis – freshman; 95 Orlando McCord – freshman; 96 Brandon Slater – sophomore; 97 Kalven Seilis – (redshirt) freshman; 98 Bronly Kashama – freshman; 99 Tyler Palsrok – junior	Linebackers: 11 Nate Paopao – junior; 20 Andre’ Hatchett – senior; 25 Jermaine Jenkins – senior; 29 Lorenzo Seaberry – senior; 40 Neal Howey – junior; 42 Marcus English – sophomore; 44 Kyle DeMaster – freshman; 45 Matt Boyd – freshman; 47 Chris Bittner – sophomore; 48 James Ervin – (redshirt) freshman; 49 Andy Mulumba – freshman; 50 Blake Browe – freshman; 51 Herb Waits – sophomore; 52 Steve Brown – sophomore; 57 Tim Fort – junior; 67 Marty Newman – (redshirt) freshman; Defensive backs: 4 Kevin Long – junior; 5 Willie Hickman – freshman; 6 Marty Cardwell – sophomore; 8 Johnny Sears – senior; 10 Ryan Downard – junior; 14 Brandon Pratt – junior; 16 Jonte Lewis – junior; 19 Arrington Hicks – junior; 21 Garrett Gronowski – freshman; 23 Chris May – senior; 24 Kelip Goodwin – freshman; 24 Tyler Thomas – (redshirt) freshman; 28 Nate Wilson – sophomore; 31 Marcell Rose – sophomore; 34 Jaron Gillespie – freshman; 36 Jon Pryor – (redshirt) freshman; 37 Mark Mitchell – junior; 41 Latarrius Thomas – junior; 43 Alex Bellfy – (redshirt) freshman; 46 Sterling Vaughn – freshman; Punters: 39 Patrick Treppa – junior; Kickers: 33 Zach Johnson – senior; 38 Joe Carithers – junior; Long snapper: 46 Alexander Gudejko – sophomore; 53 Mike Zupancic – (redshirt) freshman; 58 Matt Bowman – (redshirt) freshman; 59 Tyler Cochran – sophomore
† Starter at position * Injured; will not play in 2009.

== Coaching staff ==
Name	Position	Year at school
Ron English	Head coach	1st
Ken Karcher	Offensive coordinator Quarterbacks coach	1st
Eric Lewis	Defensive coordinator Defensive backs coach	1st
Kurt Anderson	Offensive line coach	2nd
Tom Burpee	Tight ends coach Special teams coach	1st
Antonio Carter	Wide receivers coach	1st
Tim Carter	Defensive backs coach Recruiting coordinator	1st
Casey Creehan	Defensive line coach	1st
Steve Szabo	Associate head coach Linebackers coach	1st
Tyrone Wheatley	Running backs coach	1st

== Game summaries ==
=== Army ===
	1	2	3	4	Total
Black Knights	6	7	0	14	27
Eagles	0	0	0	14	14

Scoring Summary

1st Quarter

- 06:12 ARMY – Mealy 6-yard run (Campbell kick failed) 6–0 ARMY

2nd Quarter

- 05:56 ARMY – Carter 12-yard run (Campbell kick) 13–0 ARMY

3rd Quarter

4th Quarter

- 13:58 EMU – Hunter 20-yard pass from Schmitt (Carithers kick) 13–7 ARMY
- 10:22 ARMY – Ehie 10-yard run (Smith rush) 21–7 ARMY
- 06:53 ARMY – Ehie 5-yard run (Campbell kick failed) 27–7 ARMY
- 03:31 EMU – Priest 1-yard run (Carithers kick) 27–14 ARMY

=== Northwestern ===
	1	2	3	4	Total
Eagles	0	3	7	14	24
Wildcats	7	14	0	6	27

Scoring Summary

1st Quarter

- 06:38 NU Simmons 1-yard run (Demos kick) 0–7 NU

2nd Quarter

- 12:33 NU Simmons 14-yard run (Demos kick) 0–14 NU
- 09:08 NU Johnson 70-yard interception return (Demos kick) 0–21 NU
- 03:32 EMU Carithers 33-yard field goal 3–21 NU

3rd Quarter

- 04:33 EMU Priest 1-yard run (Carithers kick) 10–21 NU

4th Quarter

- 12:57 NU Demos 20-yard field goal 10–24 NU
- 09:55 EMU Stone 25-yard pass from Schmitt (Carithers kick) 17–24 NU
- 02:40 EMU Blevins 3-yard run (Carithers kick) 24–24
- 00:06 NU Demos 49-yard field goal 24–27 NU

=== Michigan ===
	1	2	3	4	Total
Eagles	3	14	0	0	17
Wolverines	10	14	14	7	45

Scoring Summary

1st Quarter

- 10:46 MICH Olesnavage 37-yard field goal 0–3 MICH
- 05:32 EMU Carithers 43-yard field goal 3–3
- 02:30 MICH Brown 9-yard run (Olesnavage kick) 3–10 MICH

2nd Quarter

- 11:16 EMU Schmitt 11-yard run (Carithers kick) 10–10
- 09:20 MICH Shaw 5-yard run (Olesnavage kick) 10–17 MICH
- 07:15 MICH Brown 90-yard run (Olesnavage kick) 10–24 MICH
- 02:05 EMU Priest 5-yard run (Carithers kick) 17–24 MICH

3rd Quarter

- 04:47 MICH Odoms 13-yard run (Olesnavage kick) 17–31 MICH
- 03:06 MICH Robinson 13-yard run (Olesnavage kick) 17–38 MICH

4th Quarter

- 07:14 MICH Robinson 36-yard run (Olesnavage kick) 17–45 MICH

=== Temple ===
	1	2	3	4	Total
Owls	14	7	0	3	24
Eagles	0	6	0	6	12

=== Central Michigan ===
	1	2	3	4	Total
Eagles	0	0	0	8	8
Chippewas	14	21	14	7	56

Scoring Summary

1st Quarter

- 08:51 CMU Brown 70-yard pass from LeFevour (Aguila kick) 0–7 CMU
- 03:58 CMU LeFevour 1-yard run (Aguila kick) 0–14 CMU

2nd Quarter

- 12:33 CMU LeFevour 1-yard run (Aguila kick) 0–21 CMU
- 02:51 CMU Brown 75-yard punt return (Aguila kick) 0–28 CMU
- 00:18 CMU Schroeder 11-yard pass from LeFevour (Aguila kick) 0–35 CMU

3rd Quarter

- 12:50 CMU Poblah 25-yard pass from LeFevour (Aguila kick) 0–42 CMU
- 01:57 CMU LeFevour 5-yard run (Aguila kick) 0–49 CMU

4th Quarter

- 11:25 EMU Welch 1-yard run (Gillett rush) 8–49 CMU
- 07:36 CMU Volny 3-yard run (Aguila kick) 8–56 CMU

=== Kent State ===
	1	2	3	4	Total
Golden Flashes	14	0	7	7	28
Eagles	6	0	0	0	6

=== Ball State ===
	1	2	3	4	Total
Cardinals	6	7	16	0	29
Eagles	7	13	7	0	27

Scoring Summary

1st Quarter

- 9:08 EMU Thayer 3-yard pass from McMahon (Carithers kick) 0–7 EMU
- 4:52 BSU Sykes 51-yard run (Schott kick blocked) 6–7 EMU

2nd Quarter

- 10:59 EMU Carithers 20-yard field goal 6–10 EMU
- 9:23 EMU Welch 12-yard run (Carithers kick) 6–17 EMU
- 6:37 EMU Carithers 26-yard field goal 6–20 EMU
- 4:06 BSU Lewis 48-yard run (Schott kick) 13–20 EMU

3rd Quarter

- 10:44 EMU White 10-yard run (Carithers kick) 13–27 EMU
- 6:37 BSU Sykes 6-yard run (Schott kick) 20–27 EMU
- 5:33 BSU Team Safety 22–27 EMU
- 1:47 BSU Sykes 37-yard run (Schott kick) 29–27 BSU

=== Arkansas ===
	1	2	3	4	Total
Eagles	0	0	20	7	27
Razorbacks	21	21	21	0	63

Scoring Summary

1st Quarter

- 10:42 AR Davis 36-yard run (Tejada kick) 0–7 AR
- 6:42 AR Green 3-yard run (Tejada kick) 0–14 AR
- 4:02 AR Burton 50-yard interception return (Tejada kick) 0–21 AR

2nd Quarter

- 12:21 AR Adams 10-yard pass from Mallett (Tejada kick) 0–28 AR
- 4:10 AR Green 99-yard run (Tejada kick) 0–35 AR
- 1:38 AR Adams 78-yard pass from Mallet (Tejada kick) 0–42 AR

3rd Quarter

- 12:38 AR Armbrust 1-yard blocked punt return (Tejada kick) 0–49 AR
- 9:30 EMU Thayer 8-yard pass from McMahon (Carithers kick failed) 6–49 AR
- 5:58 EMU Thomas 77-yard pass from McMahon (Carithers kick) 13–49 AR
- 4:30 AR Davis 4-yard run (Tejada kick) 13–56 AR
- 2:50 EMU Bonner 32-yard pass from McMahon (Carithers kick) 20–56 AR
- 0:18 AR Miller 16-yard pass from Mallet (Tejada kick) 20–63 AR

4th Quarter

- 2:14 EMU Priest 10-yard run (Carithers kick) 27–63 AR

=== Northern Illinois ===
	1	2	3	4	Total
Eagles	6	0	0	0	6
Huskies	20	17	10	3	50

=== Western Michigan ===
	1	2	3	4	Total
Broncos	7	21	0	7	35
Eagles	7	7	0	0	14

=== Toledo ===
	1	2	3	4	Total
Eagles	0	14	7	0	21
Rockets	3	23	7	14	47

=== Akron ===
	1	2	3	4	Total
Eagles	7	7	0	7	21
Zips	14	7	7	0	28

== Awards/MAC Leaders ==
Team Statistics

- 150.5 ypg Pass Defense (1st)
- 33.7 Net yards per punt (1st)

Zach Johnson

- All-MAC Second Team Defense
- 40.4 Punting Yards Per Punt (2nd)

Andre Hatchett

- All-MAC Third Team Defense
- 113 Total Tackles (5th)

Johnny Sears

- 33 Kickoff Returns (5th)
- 7 Passes Defended (Tied 3rd)

Martavius Cardwell

- 60 Solo Tackles (5th)

Brandon Downs

- 7.5 Sacks (4th)

Chris May

- 6 Interceptions (Tied 2nd)
- 126 Interception Return Yards (1st)
