= 2009 Miami RedHawks football team =

American college football season

2009 Miami RedHawks football
- Conference: Mid-American Conference
- East Division
- Record: 1–11 (1–7 MAC)
- Head coach: Michael Haywood (1st season)
- Offensive coordinator: Peter Vaas (1st season)
- Offensive scheme: Spread
- Defensive coordinator: Carl Reese (1st season)
- Base defense: 4–3
- Home stadium: Yager Stadium

2009 Mid-American Conference football standings
	Conf.			Overall
Team	W		L	W		L
East Division
Ohio xy	7	–	1	9	–	5
Temple x	7	–	1	9	–	4
Bowling Green	6	–	2	7	–	6
Kent State	4	–	4	5	–	7
Buffalo	3	–	5	5	–	7
Akron	2	–	6	3	–	9
Miami (OH)	1	–	7	1	–	11
West Division
No. 23 Central Michigan x$	8	–	0	12	–	2
Northern Illinois	5	–	3	7	–	6
Western Michigan	4	–	4	5	–	7
Toledo	3	–	5	5	–	7
Ball State	2	–	6	2	–	10
Eastern Michigan	0	–	8	0	–	12
Championship: Central Michigan 20, Ohio 10
$ – Conference champion; x – Division champion/co-champions; y – Championship game participant; Rankings from AP Poll

The 2009 Miami RedHawks football team represented Miami University during the 2009 NCAA Division I FBS football season They competed in the Mid-American Conference (MAC) East Division. The team was coached by Mike Haywood and played their homes game in Yager Stadium. The Redhawks finished the season on November 18 with a record of 1–11 (1–7 MAC).

== Before the season ==
=== Recruiting ===
College recruiting information (2009)
Name	Hometown	School	Height	Weight	40^{‡}	Commit date
John Anevski; OL	Cincinnati, OH	Elder HS	6 ft 4 in (1.93 m)	275 lb (125 kg)	5.1	Jan 18, 2009
John Anevski; OL	Recruit ratings: Scout: Rivals: (73)					
Austin Boucher; QB	Kettering, OH	Archbishop Alter HS	6 ft 1 in (1.85 m)	197 lb (89 kg)	4.7	Jan 28, 2009
Austin Boucher; QB	Recruit ratings: Scout: Rivals: (73)					
Collin Boucher; LB	Kettering, OH	Archbishop Alter HS	6 ft 2 in (1.88 m)	225 lb (102 kg)	4.79	Feb 4, 2009
Collin Boucher; LB	Recruit ratings: Scout: Rivals: (40)					
Justin Bowers; RB	Murfreesboro, TN	Blackman HS	5 ft 10 in (1.78 m)	195 lb (88 kg)	4.5	Feb 4, 2009
Justin Bowers; RB	Recruit ratings: Scout: Rivals: (40)					
Austin Brown; OL	Woodbridge, VA	Woodbridge HS	6 ft 1 in (1.85 m)	230 lb (100 kg)	5.61	Jan 27, 2009
Austin Brown; OL	Recruit ratings: Scout: Rivals: (40)					
Erik Finklea; RB	Cincinnati, OH	Woodward HS	6 ft 1 in (1.85 m)	190 lb (86 kg)	4.4	Jan 22, 2009
Erik Finklea; RB	Recruit ratings: Scout: Rivals: (72)					
Evan Harris; LB	Waldorf, MD	Westlake HS	5 ft 11 in (1.80 m)	213 lb (97 kg)	4.6	Jan 25, 2009
Evan Harris; LB	Recruit ratings: Scout: Rivals: (40)					
Josh Harvey; OL	Columbia, MO	Columbia-Hickman HS	6 ft 5 in (1.96 m)	325 lb (147 kg)	-	Feb 4, 2009
Josh Harvey; OL	Recruit ratings: Scout: Rivals: (40)					
Pat Hinkel; DB	Cleveland, OH	St. Ignatius HS	6 ft 1 in (1.85 m)	190 lb (86 kg)	-	Jul 13, 2008
Pat Hinkel; DB	Recruit ratings: Scout: Rivals: (77)					
Roman Lawson; LB	Shaker Heights, OH	Shaker Heights HS	6 ft 1 in (1.85 m)	220 lb (100 kg)	4.8	Oct 25, 2008
Roman Lawson; LB	Recruit ratings: Scout: Rivals: (72)					
Steve Marck; TE	Fairless Hills, PA	Pennsbury SHS	6 ft 3 in (1.91 m)	225 lb (102 kg)	4.75	Jan 25, 2009
Steve Marck; TE	Recruit ratings: Scout: Rivals: (75)					
Austin Moore; LB	Springfield, OH	Springfield HS	5 ft 11 in (1.80 m)	219 lb (99 kg)	4.7	Jul 27, 2008
Austin Moore; LB	Recruit ratings: Scout: Rivals: (73)					
Andrew Muller; DE	Charlotte, NC	Charlotte Catholic HS	6 ft 4 in (1.93 m)	270 lb (120 kg)	-	Feb 4, 2009
Andrew Muller; DE	Recruit ratings: Scout: Rivals: (40)					
Bernard Pinckney; DB	Sylvania, OH	Sylvania Southview HS	6 ft 1 in (1.85 m)	190 lb (86 kg)	4.67	Jan 22, 2009
Bernard Pinckney; DB	Recruit ratings: Scout: Rivals: (40)					
Justin Semmes; RB	Orchard Lake, MI	St. Mary Preparatory School	6 ft 2 in (1.88 m)	222 lb (101 kg)	-	Jan 18, 2009
Justin Semmes; RB	Recruit ratings: Scout: Rivals: (76)					
Anthony Shoemaker; DE	Cincinnati, OH	Princeton HS	6 ft 4 in (1.93 m)	255 lb (116 kg)	-	Feb 4, 2009
Anthony Shoemaker; DE	Recruit ratings: Scout: Rivals: (73)					
Brian Slack; TE	Akron, OH	Archbishop Hoban HS	6 ft 4 in (1.93 m)	225 lb (102 kg)	-	Jul 30, 2008
Brian Slack; TE	Recruit ratings: Scout: Rivals: (77)					
John Steele; DT	Cleveland, OH	South HS	6 ft 3 in (1.91 m)	273 lb (124 kg)	4.8	Feb 2, 2009
John Steele; DT	Recruit ratings: Scout: Rivals: (40)					
B.J. Stevens; DE	Monroeville, PA	N/A	6 ft 1 in (1.85 m)	234 lb (106 kg)	4.68	May 12, 2008
B.J. Stevens; DE	Recruit ratings: Rivals:					
Luke Swift; WR	Greenwood, IN	Center Grove HS	6 ft 1 in (1.85 m)	170 lb (77 kg)	4.5	Jan 27, 2009
Luke Swift; WR	Recruit ratings: Scout: Rivals: (40)					
Chris Wade; LB	Slidell, LA	Northshore HS	6 ft 1 in (1.85 m)	216 lb (98 kg)	4.61	Jan 27, 2009
Chris Wade; LB	Recruit ratings: Scout: Rivals: (65)					
Ishmael White; LB	Woodstock, GA	Etowah HS	6 ft 1 in (1.85 m)	210 lb (95 kg)	4.6	Feb 4, 2009
Ishmael White; LB	Recruit ratings: Scout: Rivals: (74)					
Evan Wiley; OL	Toledo, OH	St. Johns Jesuit HS	6 ft 6 in (1.98 m)	290 lb (130 kg)	4.95	Jan 26, 2009
Evan Wiley; OL	Recruit ratings: Scout: Rivals: (40)					
Joseph Williams; OL	Houston, TX	Strake Jesuit College Prep	6 ft 2 in (1.88 m)	287 lb (130 kg)	4.96	Feb 4, 2009
Joseph Williams; OL	Recruit ratings: Scout: Rivals: (68)					
Wes Williams; DE	Houston, TX	Strake Jesuit College Prep	6 ft 3 in (1.91 m)	210 lb (95 kg)	-	Feb 4, 2009
Wes Williams; DE	Recruit ratings: Rivals: (40)					
Overall recruit ranking: Scout: 97 Rivals: 88
‡ Refers to 40-yard dash; Note: In many cases, Scout, Rivals, 247Sports, On3, and ESPN may conflict in their listings of height, weight and 40 time.; In these cases, the average was taken. ESPN grades are on a 100-point scale.; Sources: "Miami-OH Commit List for 2009". Rivals.; "Football Recruiting: Miami (Oh)". Scout.; "Miami (OH Football Recruiting 2009". ESPN.; "Scout.com Team Recruiting Rankings". Scout.; "2009 Team Ranking". Rivals.com.

== Schedule ==
Date	Time	Opponent	Site	TV	Result	Attendance	Source
September 5	12:00 p.m.	vs. Kentucky*	Paul Brown Stadium; Cincinnati, OH	ESPNU	L 0–42	41,037	
September 12	8:00 p.m.	at No. 12 Boise State*	Bronco Stadium; Boise, ID	ESPN360	L 0–48	32,228	
September 19	7:00 p.m.	at Western Michigan	Waldo Stadium; Kalamazoo, MI		L 26–48	24,372	
September 26	7:00 p.m.	at Kent State	Dix Stadium; Kent, OH		L 19–29	15,235	
October 3	1:00 p.m.	No. 10 Cincinnati*	Yager Stadium; Oxford, OH (Victory Bell)	ESPN360	L 13–37	23,493	
October 10	12:00 p.m.	at Northwestern*	Ryan Field; Evanston, IL		L 6–16	23,085	
October 17	2:00 p.m.	at Ohio	Peden Stadium; Athens, OH (Battle of the Bricks)		L 7–28	20,188	
October 24	1:00 p.m.	Northern Illinois^{†}	Yager Stadium; Oxford, OH		L 22–27	9,884	
October 31	3:30 p.m.	Toledo	Yager Stadium; Oxford, OH	ONN	W 31–24	8,757	
November 5	7:30 p.m.	at Temple	Lincoln Financial Field; Philadelphia, PA		L 32–34	13,827	
November 12	6:00 p.m.	Bowling Green	Yager Stadium; Oxford, OH		L 14–35	8,935	
November 18	6:00 pm	Buffalo	Yager Stadium; Oxford, OH	ESPNU	L 17–42	7,983	
*Non-conference game; ^{†}Homecoming; Rankings from AP Poll released prior to the game; All times are in Eastern time

== Roster ==
As of 2009-08-21
Wide receivers: 1 Dustin Woods – senior; 2 Eugene Harris – (redshirt) junior; 8 Brayden Coombs – (redshirt) senior; 9 Jamal Rogers – junior; 11 Armand Robinson – (redshirt) junior; 15 Andrew Cruse – (redshirt) freshman; 17 Chris Givens – junior; 23 Max Warren – freshman; 23 Kevin Bresnahan – (redshirt) sophomore; 25 Glenn Miller – (redshirt) freshman; 80 Aaron Mickens – (redshirt) freshman; 81 Joe Clarke – freshman; 84 Mitchell Anderson – (redshirt) junior; 86 Donovan Potter – (redshirt) junior; 88 Luke Swift – freshman; Offensive line: 50 Nick Kemper – (redshirt) freshman; 52 Sean Redwine – (redshirt) junior; 55 Rhys Newman – (redshirt) junior; 56 Brandon Brooks – (redshirt) sophomore; 60 Steve Bray – (redshirt) sophomore; 61 Andrew Illig – (redshirt) freshman; 63 Ken Staudinger – (redshirt) sophomore; 64 Josh Harvey – freshman; 66 Matt Kennedy – (redshirt) freshman; 67 John Anevski – freshman; 70 Nate Williams – (redshirt) junior; 71 Andrew Phelan – (redshirt) freshman; 72 Brad Bednar – freshman; 74 Lee Zamos – (redshirt) sophomore; 75 Bob Gulley – (redshirt) junior; 76 Evan Wiley – freshman; 77 Caleb Day – freshman; Tight ends: 21 Jordan Stevens – (redshirt) junior; 80 Danny Day – (redshirt) freshman; 81 Brett Hoffman – sophomore; 82 Kendrick Bruton – (redshirt) sophomore; 83 Trevor Behmke – (redshirt) freshman; 83 Brian Slack – freshman; 87 Steve Marck – freshman; 89 Rob Reiland – (redshirt) sophomore	Quarterbacks: 4 Zac Dysert – (redshirt) freshman; 12 Dan Raudabaugh – senior; 13 Clay Belton – (redshirt) sophomore; 15 Drew Jackson – freshman; 16 Austin Boucher – freshman; 18 Mike Scherpenberg – (redshirt) junior; Running backs: 10 Andre Bratton – (redshirt) senior; 20 Quincy Landingham – (redshirt) sophomore; 24 Roman Lawson – freshman; 34 Thomas Merriweather – junior; 38 J.R. Taylor – sophomore; Fullbacks: 33 Sascha Miller – (redshirt) freshman; 46 Justin Semmes – freshman; Defensive line: 57 Wes Williams – freshman; 58 Brian Lane – (redshirt) sophomore; 68 Andrew Muller – freshman; 69 William Diaz – (redshirt) freshman; 73 Jason Semmes – (redshirt) sophomore; 78 Anthony Shoemaker – freshman; 79 Jordain Brown – (redshirt) sophomore; 85 Morris Council – sophomore; 90 Austin Brown – freshman; 91 Joseph Williams – freshman; 93 Martin Channels – senior; 94 Mike Johns – (redshirt) freshman; 95 D.J. Svabik – (redshirt) junior; 96 Evan Klepec – (redshirt) freshman; 97 Matt Kajmowicz – (redshirt) sophomore; 98 Mark Paun – senior	Linebackers: 5 Luke Kelly – (redshirt) sophomore; 5 Ryan Kennedy – sophomore; 9 Ishmael White – freshman; 14 David Davis – junior; 30 Evan Harris – freshman; 31 DeAndre Gilmore – junior; 32 Jaytee Swanson – (redshirt) freshman; 43 Jerrell Wedge – (redshirt) sophomore; 44 Caleb Bostic – senior; 45 C.J. Marck – (redshirt) sophomore; 47 Chris Rutledge – (redshirt) freshman; 48 Chris Wade – freshman; 49 Erik Finklea – freshman; 51 Austin Moore – freshman; 53 Alex Kaufman – (redshirt) sophomore; 59 Scott Madsen – (redshirt) sophomore; 65 Collin Boucher – freshman; Defensive backs: 3 Jeff Thompson – senior; 6 D.J. Brown – (redshirt) freshman; 18 Anthony Kokal – (redshirt) sophomore; 22 Jordan Gafford – (redshirt) junior; 23 Ben Bennett – (redshirt) junior; 24 Brandon Stephens – (redshirt) junior; 25 Cornelius Ward – (redshirt) sophomore; 26 Wendell Brunson – senior; 27 Peris Edwards – (redshirt) junior; 29 Justin Bowers – freshman; 33 Jonathan Wells – (redshirt) sophomore; 35 Jordan Padgett – freshman; 37 Pat Hinkel – freshman; 47 Kasey Wendal – (redshirt) sophomore; Punters: 92 Chris DiCesare – senior; 93 Zach Murphy – freshman; Kickers: 19 Trevor Cook – junior; 39 Seth Philip – (redshirt) junior; 45 Jim Broadway – (redshirt) freshman; Long snapper: 54 Chase Collins – senior; 62 Mike Rummler – (redshirt) junior; Other Players: 28 Danny Green – (redshirt) freshman
† Starter at position * Injured; will not play in 2009.

== Coaching staff ==
Name	Position	Year at school
Michael Haywood	Head coach	1st
Cedric Cormier	Wide receivers coach	1st
Bill Elias	Assistant head coach Recruiting coordinator Linebackers coach	1st
Lance Guidry	Defensive backs coach	1st
Bill Mottola	Offensive line coach	1st
Carl Reese	Defensive coordinator Linebackers coach	1st
Antoine Smith	Defensive line coach	1st
Peter Vaas	Offensive coordinator Tight ends coach	1st
KiJuan Ware	Running backs coach	1st
Morris Watts	Quarterbacks coach	1st

== Game summaries ==
=== Kentucky ===
	1	2	3	4	Total
Wildcats	0	21	14	7	42
RedHawks	0	0	0	0	0

Scoring summary

1st quarter

2nd quarter

- 11:28 UK Cobb 27-yard pass from Hartline (Seiber kick) 7-0 UK
- 06:50 UK Locke 16-yard run (Seiber kick) 14-0 UK
- 01:55 UK Matthews 21-yard pass from Hartline (Seiber kick) 21-0 UK

3rd quarter

- 11:30 UK Cobb 11-yard run (Seiber kick) 28-0 UK
- 07:28 UK Lindley 25-yard interception return (Seiber kick) 35-0 UK

4th quarter

- 13:58 UK Allen 9-yard run (Seiber kick) 42-0 UK

=== Boise State ===
	1	2	3	4	Total
RedHawks	0	0	0	0	0
#11 Broncos	14	6	14	14	48

1st quarter

- 07:16 BSU- Austin Pettis 17 Yd Pass From Kellen Moore (Kyle Brotzman Kick) 0-7
- 01:17 BSU- Tyler Shoemaker 15 Yd Pass From Kellen Moore (Kyle Brotzman Kick) 0-14

2nd quarter

- 00:08 BSU- Titus Young 25 Yd Pass From Kellen Moore (Pat Failed) 0-20

3rd quarter

- 07:09 BSU- D.J. Harper 3 Yd Run (Kyle Brotzman Kick) 0-27
- 02:11 BSU- Titus Young 54 Yd Pass From Kellen Moore (Kyle Brotzman Kick) 0-34

4th quarter

- 09:46 BSU- Doug Martin 4 Yd Run (Kyle Brotzman Kick) 0-41
- 01:56 BSU- Doug Martin 2 Yd Run (Jimmy Pavel Kick) 0-48

=== Western Michigan ===
	1	2	3	4	Total
RedHawks	0	0	12	14	26
Broncos	14	14	20	0	48

Scoring summary

1st quarter

- 14:53 WMU Berry 24-yard fumble recovery (Potter kick) 0-7 WMU
- 09:29 WMU Nunez 10-yard pass from Hiller (Potter kick) 0-14 WMU

2nd quarter

- 13:53 WMU Hammond 1-yard pass from Hiller (Potter kick) 0-21 WMU
- 02:07 WMU Nunez 16-yard pass from Hiller (Potter kick) 0-28 WMU

3rd quarter

- 09:37 WMU West 1-yard run (Potter kick) 0-35 WMU
- 07:09 MIAMI Harris 14-yard pass from Raudabaugh (Cook kick blocked) 6-35 WMU
- 04:36 WMU West 7-yard pass from Hiller (Potter kick) 6-42 WMU
- 03:52 WMU Winchester 1-yard run (Potter kick failed) 6-48 WMU
- 01:06 MIAMI Harris 42-yard pass from Raudabaugh (Green rush failed) 12-48 WMU

4th quarter

- 06:46 MIAMI Lawson 2-yard run (Cook kick) 19-48 WMU
- 00:51 MIAMI Stevens 11-yard pass from Dysert (Cook kick) 26-47 WMU

=== Kent State ===
	1	2	3	4	Total
RedHawks	3	7	6	3	19
Golden Flashes	6	13	7	3	29

Scoring summary

1st quarter

- 4:48 MIAMI Cook 28-yard field goal 3-0 MIAMI
- 4:34 KENT Bowman 92-yard kickoff return (Cortez kick failed) 3-6 KENT

2nd quarter

- 13:18 KENT Archer 28-yard run (Cortez kick) 3-13 KENT
- 7:49 KENT Cortez 37-yard field goal 3-16 KENT
- 2:35 KENT Cortez 42-yard field goal 3-19 KENT
- 0:04 MIAMI Rogers 9-yard pass from Dysert (Cook kick) 10-19 KENT

3rd quarter

- 5:54 KENT Konz 56-yard pass from Keith (Cortez kick) 10-26 KENT
- 2:52 MIAMI Merriweather 1-yard run (Dysert pass failed) 16-26 KENT

4th quarter

- 1:19 Cortez 34-yard field goal 19-26 KENT

=== Cincinnati ===
	1	2	3	4	Total
#11 Bearcats	13	10	0	14	37
RedHawks	0	7	6	0	13

=== Northwestern ===
	1	2	3	4	Total
RedHawks	0	0	0	6	6
Wildcats	10	0	6	0	16

Scoring summary

1st quarter

- 12:20 NU Demos 46-yard field goal 0-3 NU
- 00:05 NU Kafka 6-yard run (Demos kick) 0-10 NU

3rd quarter

- 01:18 NU Kafka 1-yard run (Demos pass intercepted) 0-16 NU

4th quarter

- 01:19 MIAMI Cruse 23-yard pass from Dysert (Dysert pass failed) 6-16 NU

=== Ohio ===
	1	2	3	4	Total
RedHawks	7	0	0	0	7
Bobcats	7	14	0	7	28

=== Northern Illinois ===
	1	2	3	4	Total
Huskies	17	0	0	10	27
RedHawks	0	7	0	15	22

Scoring summary

1st quarter

- 8:01 NIU Spann 42-yard run (Salerno kick) 7-0 NIU
- 5:05 NIU Salerno 44-yard field goal 10-0 NIU
- 2:42 NIU Ashford 44-yard punt return (Salerno kick) 17-0 NIU

2nd quarter

- 0:35 MIAMI Robinson 14-yard pass from Dysert (Cook kick) 17-7 NIU

4th quarter

- 12:49 MIAMI Cook 32-yard field goal 17-10 NIU
- 6:14 NIU Salerno 25-yard field goal 20-10 NIU
- 1:58 MIAMI Rogers 4-yard pass from Dysert (Cook kick blocked) 20-16 NIU
- 0:58 NIU Spann 40-yard run (Salerno kick) 27-16 NIU
- 0:00 MIAMI Robinson 24-yard pass from Dysert 27-22 NIU

=== Toledo ===
	1	2	3	4	Total
Rockets	7	0	17	0	24
RedHawks	7	17	7	0	31

Scoring summary

1st quarter

- 10:55 MIAMI Williams 20-yard interception return (Cook kick) 0-7 MIAMI
- 0:44 TOLEDO Collins 1-yard run (Steigerwald kick) 7-7

2nd quarter

- 13:14 MIAMI Cruse 10-yard pass from Dysert (Cook kick) 7-14 MIAMI
- 7:04 MIAMI Dysert 3-yard run (Cook kick) 7-21 MIAMI
- 0:37 MIAMI Cook 55-yard field goal 7-24 MIAMI

3rd quarter

- 12:55 TOLEDO Page 14-yard pass from Opelt (Steigerwald kick) 14-24 MIAMI
- 7:09 TOLEDO Steigerwald 26-yard field goal 17-24 MIAMI
- 3:47 MIAMI Dysert 23-yard run (Cook kick) 17-31 MIAMI
- 0:31 TOLEDO Page 15-yard run (Steigerwald kick) 24-31 MIAMI

=== Temple ===
	1	2	3	4	Total
RedHawks	3	10	0	19	32
Owls	14	7	10	3	34

=== Bowling Green ===
	1	2	3	4	Total
Falcons	7	7	14	7	35
RedHawks	7	7	0	0	14

=== Buffalo ===
	1	2	3	4	Total
Bulls	0	21	7	14	42
RedHawks	0	3	7	7	17
