= 2009 Central Michigan Chippewas football team =

American college football season

2009 Central Michigan Chippewas football

MAC champion MAC West Division champion GMAC Bowl champion

MAC Championship Game, W 20–10 vs. Ohio

GMAC Bowl, W 44–41 ^{2OT} vs. Troy
- Conference: Mid-American Conference
- West Division

Ranking
- Coaches: No. 24
- AP: No. 23
- Record: 12–2 (8–0 MAC)
- Head coach: Butch Jones (3rd season; regular season); Steve Stripling (interim; bowl game)
- Offensive coordinator: Mike Bajakian (3rd season)
- Defensive coordinator: Tim Banks (3rd season)
- Home stadium: Kelly/Shorts Stadium

2009 Mid-American Conference football standings
	Conf.			Overall
Team	W		L	W		L
East Division
Ohio xy	7	–	1	9	–	5
Temple x	7	–	1	9	–	4
Bowling Green	6	–	2	7	–	6
Kent State	4	–	4	5	–	7
Buffalo	3	–	5	5	–	7
Akron	2	–	6	3	–	9
Miami (OH)	1	–	7	1	–	11
West Division
No. 23 Central Michigan x$	8	–	0	12	–	2
Northern Illinois	5	–	3	7	–	6
Western Michigan	4	–	4	5	–	7
Toledo	3	–	5	5	–	7
Ball State	2	–	6	2	–	10
Eastern Michigan	0	–	8	0	–	12
Championship: Central Michigan 20, Ohio 10
$ – Conference champion; x – Division champion/co-champions; y – Championship game participant; Rankings from AP Poll

The 2009 Central Michigan Chippewas football team represented Central Michigan University during the 2009 NCAA Division I FBS football season. Central Michigan competed as a member of the Mid-American Conference (MAC) West Division. The team was coached by Butch Jones and played their home games in Kelly/Shorts Stadium. The Chippewas finished the regular season 10–2 and 8–0 in conference play, beat Ohio in the 2009 MAC Championship Game to win the MAC title and were invited to the GMAC Bowl where they defeated Sun Belt Champion Troy 44–41 in double overtime.

At the end of the season, Jones departed Central Michigan to become the head football coach at the University of Cincinnati. Steve Stripling, the defensive ends coach, became interim head coach and coached the GMAC bowl.

== Before the season ==
=== Recruiting ===
College recruiting information (2009)
Name	Hometown	School	Height	Weight	40^{‡}	Commit date
Justice Akuezue; DE	Ann Arbor, MI	Huron HS	6 ft 3 in (1.91 m)	204 lb (93 kg)	4.5	Jul 30, 2008
Justice Akuezue; DE	Recruit ratings: Scout: Rivals: (40)					
Deja Alexander; WR	Jacksonville, FL	First Coast HS	6 ft 1 in (1.85 m)	185 lb (84 kg)	-	Jan 20, 2009
Deja Alexander; WR	Recruit ratings: Scout: Rivals: (40)					
Shamari Benton; DB	Birmingham, MI	Brother Rice HS	6 ft 1 in (1.85 m)	194 lb (88 kg)	4.4	Oct 19, 2008
Shamari Benton; DB	Recruit ratings: Scout: Rivals: (77)					
Galen Clemons; LB	Northampton, PA	Northampton Area SHS	6 ft 3 in (1.91 m)	243 lb (110 kg)	4.7	Feb 3, 2009
Galen Clemons; LB	Recruit ratings: Scout: Rivals: (40)					
Jon Czerwienski; OL	Roseville, MI	Fraser HS	6 ft 5 in (1.96 m)	265 lb (120 kg)	-	Jul 27, 2008
Jon Czerwienski; OL	Recruit ratings: Scout: Rivals: (40)					
Leron Eaddy; DB	Clarksville, MD	River Hill HS	5 ft 10 in (1.78 m)	185 lb (84 kg)	4.57	Jul 1, 2008
Leron Eaddy; DB	Recruit ratings: Scout: Rivals: (77)					
Jeff Fantuzzi; OL	Macomb, MI	Dakota HS	6 ft 4 in (1.93 m)	276 lb (125 kg)	5.1	Jul 29, 2008
Jeff Fantuzzi; OL	Recruit ratings: Scout: Rivals: (80)					
Adam Fenton; LB	Birmingham, MI	Ernest W. Seaholm HS	6 ft 2 in (1.88 m)	204 lb (93 kg)	4.7	Jul 7, 2008
Adam Fenton; LB	Recruit ratings: Scout: Rivals: (72)					
Eric Fisher; OL	Rochester Hills, MI	Stoney Creek HS	6 ft 7 in (2.01 m)	260 lb (120 kg)	-	Jul 29, 2008
Eric Fisher; OL	Recruit ratings: Scout: Rivals: (40)					
Jarrett Fleming; WR	South Bend, IN	Washington HS	6 ft 5 in (1.96 m)	215 lb (98 kg)	-	Jul 28, 2008
Jarrett Fleming; WR	Recruit ratings: Scout: Rivals: (74)					
Bobby James; TE	Hobart, IN	Hobart HS	6 ft 4 in (1.93 m)	235 lb (107 kg)	4.65	Jul 23, 2008
Bobby James; TE	Recruit ratings: Scout: Rivals: (77)					
Jason Johnson; DB	Durand, MI	Durand Area HS	6 ft 1 in (1.85 m)	176 lb (80 kg)	-	Jul 11, 2008
Jason Johnson; DB	Recruit ratings: Scout: Rivals: (65)					
Aaron Kaczmarski; DE	Merrillville, IN	Merrillville HS	6 ft 6 in (1.98 m)	245 lb (111 kg)	-	Jun 27, 2008
Aaron Kaczmarski; DE	Recruit ratings: Scout: Rivals: (40)					
Ronnie Kennedy; ATH	Lauderhill, FL	Plantation HS	5 ft 7 in (1.70 m)	147 lb (67 kg)	-	Jan 29, 2009
Ronnie Kennedy; ATH	Recruit ratings: Scout: Rivals: (76)					
Dominic Mainello; OL	Covington, KY	Beechwood HS	6 ft 5 in (1.96 m)	245 lb (111 kg)	4.9	Jul 29, 2008
Dominic Mainello; OL	Recruit ratings: Scout: Rivals: (40)					
Aaron McCord; DT	Detroit, MI	Crockett Vocational Tech	6 ft 3 in (1.91 m)	270 lb (120 kg)	-	Jul 29, 2008
Aaron McCord; DT	Recruit ratings: Scout: Rivals: (74)					
Davon Muse; RB	Baltimore, MD	Paul Laurence Dunbar HS	5 ft 8 in (1.73 m)	160 lb (73 kg)	-	Jan 22, 2009
Davon Muse; RB	Recruit ratings: Scout: Rivals: (40)					
Cody Pettit; DE	Hamler, OH	Patrick Henry HS	6 ft 3 in (1.91 m)	235 lb (107 kg)	4.88	Jul 17, 2008
Cody Pettit; DE	Recruit ratings: Scout: Rivals: (74)					
Tim Phillips; ATH	Louisville, KY	Trinity HS	5 ft 5 in (1.65 m)	168 lb (76 kg)	4.45	Jul 11, 2008
Tim Phillips; ATH	Recruit ratings: Scout: Rivals: (40)					
Evan Ray; DB	Detroit, MI	Finney HS	6 ft 1 in (1.85 m)	190 lb (86 kg)	4.5	Aug 25, 2008
Evan Ray; DB	Recruit ratings: Scout: Rivals: (40)					
Malek Redd; RB	Clarksville, MD	River Hill HS	5 ft 6 in (1.68 m)	164 lb (74 kg)	-	Jun 25, 2008
Malek Redd; RB	Recruit ratings: Scout: Rivals: (71)					
Caesar Rodriguez; DE	Miami, FL	Christopher Columbus HS	6 ft 2 in (1.88 m)	208 lb (94 kg)	4.8	Jan 20, 2009
Caesar Rodriguez; DE	Recruit ratings: Scout: Rivals: (73)					
Adam Schneid; OL	Avon Lake, OH	Avon Lake HS	6 ft 5 in (1.96 m)	258 lb (117 kg)	5.22	Jul 10, 2008
Adam Schneid; OL	Recruit ratings: Scout: Rivals: (67)					
Will Schwarz; LB	Troy, MI	Troy HS	6 ft 4 in (1.93 m)	212 lb (96 kg)	-	Aug 19, 2008
Will Schwarz; LB	Recruit ratings: Scout: Rivals: (73)					
D.J. Scott; ATH	Frederick, MD	Gov Thomas Johnson HS	5 ft 9 in (1.75 m)	164 lb (74 kg)	4.47	Jul 28, 2008
D.J. Scott; ATH	Recruit ratings: Scout: Rivals: (72)					
Alex Smith; LB	Barrington, IL	Barrington HS	6 ft 3 in (1.91 m)	225 lb (102 kg)	-	Oct 23, 2008
Alex Smith; LB	Recruit ratings: Scout: Rivals: (71)					
Zurlon Tipton; RB	Sterling Heights, MI	Parkway Christian	6 ft 1 in (1.85 m)	195 lb (88 kg)	4.48	Jul 28, 2008
Zurlon Tipton; RB	Recruit ratings: Scout: Rivals: (40)					
A.J. Westendorp; QB	Holland, MI	Holland Christian HS	6 ft 2 in (1.88 m)	208 lb (94 kg)	4.72	Feb 2, 2009
A.J. Westendorp; QB	Recruit ratings: Scout: Rivals: (40)					
Cody Wilson; WR	Rochester Hills, MI	Rochester Adams HS	5 ft 11 in (1.80 m)	165 lb (75 kg)	-	Jun 18, 2008
Cody Wilson; WR	Recruit ratings: Scout: Rivals: (40)					
Kyle Zelinsky; LB	Bartlett, IL	Bartlett HS	6 ft 1 in (1.85 m)	220 lb (100 kg)	-	Dec 20, 2008
Kyle Zelinsky; LB	Recruit ratings: Scout: Rivals: (76)					
Overall recruit ranking:
‡ Refers to 40-yard dash; Note: In many cases, Scout, Rivals, 247Sports, On3, and ESPN may conflict in their listings of height, weight and 40 time.; In these cases, the average was taken. ESPN grades are on a 100-point scale.; Sources: "Central Michigan Commit List for 2009". Rivals.; "Scout.com: Football Recruiting". Scout.; "Central Michigan Football Recruiting 2009". ESPN.; "Scout.com Team Recruiting Rankings". Scout.; "2009 Team Ranking". Rivals.com.

== Schedule ==
Date	Time	Opponent	Rank	Site	TV	Result	Attendance
September 5	10:00 p.m.	at Arizona*		Arizona Stadium; Tucson, AZ		L 6–19	51,683
September 12	12:00 p.m.	at Michigan State*		Spartan Stadium; East Lansing, MI	ESPN2	W 29–27	76,221
September 19	3:30 p.m.	Alcorn State*		Kelly/Shorts Stadium; Mount Pleasant, MI		W 48–0	18,323
September 26	3:30 p.m.	Akron		Kelly/Shorts Stadium; Mount Pleasant, MI	FSO	W 48–21	20,032
October 3	3:30 p.m.	at Buffalo		UB Stadium; Buffalo, NY		W 20–13	18,092
October 10	12:00 p.m.	Eastern Michigan^{†}		Kelly/Shorts Stadium; Mount Pleasant, MI (rivalry)	ESPN Plus	W 56–8	26,730
October 17	3:30 p.m.	at Western Michigan		Waldo Stadium; Kalamazoo, MI (rivalry)	FSD+	W 34–23	27,896
October 24	12:00 p.m.	at Bowling Green		Doyt Perry Stadium; Bowling Green, OH	ESPN Plus	W 24–10	10,042
October 31	3:30 p.m.	at Boston College*		Alumni Stadium; Chestnut Hill, MA	ESPNU	L 10–31	34,128
November 11	8:00 p.m.	Toledo		Kelly/Shorts Stadium; Mount Pleasant, MI	ESPN2	W 56–28	18,310
November 18	8:00 p.m.	at Ball State		Scheumann Stadium; Muncie, IN	ESPN2	W 35–3	5,736
November 27	1:00 p.m.	Northern Illinois		Kelly/Shorts Stadium; Mount Pleasant, MI	ESPNU	W 45–31	15,113
December 4	8:00 p.m.	vs. Ohio		Ford Field; Detroit, MI (MAC Championship Game)	ESPN2	W 20–10	23,714
January 6	7:00 p.m.	vs. Troy*	No. 25	Ladd–Peebles Stadium; Mobile, AL (GMAC Bowl)	ESPN	W 44–41 ^{2OT}	34,486
*Non-conference game; ^{†}Homecoming; Rankings from AP Poll released prior to the game; All times are in Eastern time

== Rankings ==
Ranking movements Legend: ██ Increase in ranking ██ Decrease in ranking — = Not ranked RV = Received votes
	Week															
Poll	Pre	1	2	3	4	5	6	7	8	9	10	11	12	13	14	Final
AP	—	—	—	—	—	—	RV	RV	RV	RV	—	—	RV	RV	25	23
Coaches	—	—	—	—	—	RV	RV	RV	RV	RV	RV	RV	RV	RV	RV	24
Harris	Not released				—	—	—	—	—	—	—	—	—	—	—	Not released
BCS	Not released							—	—	—	—	—	—	—	—	Not released

== Roster ==
2009 Central Michigan Chippewas football team roster
Players
Coaches
Offense

Pos.	#	Name	Class
WR	1	Kito Poblah	Jr
WR	4	Jahleel Addae	Fr
WR	7	Bryan Anderson	Sr
WR	10	Ronnie Kennedy	Fr
WR	11	Cornelius Gallon	So
WR	11	Cody Wilson	Fr
WR	25	Sean Skergan	Jr
WR	27	Antonio Brown	Jr
WR	35	Jordan McConnell	Fr
WR	80	Cedric Fraser	So
WR	81	Jerry Harris	So
WR	83	Reggie Brown	Fr
WR	84	Deja Alexander	Fr
WR	85	Matt Torres	Jr
WR	87	Jeremy Wilson	So
WR	88	Valtorrey Showers	Fr
WR	89	Connor Odykirk	Fr
OL		Zach Wiersma	Fr
OL	58	Anthony Quinn	Jr
OL	63	Colin Miller	Jr
OL	64	Allen Ollenburger	Sr
OL	65	Darren Keyton	Fr
OL	66	Jeff Maddux	Jr
OL	67	Mike Repovz	Fr
OL	68	Richard Hayes	Fr
OL	69	Nick Reynolds	Fr
OL	70	Adam Schneid	Fr
OL	71	Matt Kanitz	Fr
OL	73	Jake Olson	Fr
OL	74	Jeff Fantuzzi	Fr
OL	76	Todd Johnson	Sr
OL	77	Jon Czerwienski	Fr
OL	78	Rocky Weaver	So
OL	79	Eric Fisher	Fr
TE	84	Jacob Johnson	Fr
TE		Charlie Hoch	Fr
TE	82	David Blackburn	So
TE	86	Bobby James	Fr
QB	8	Ryan Radcliff	Fr
QB	13	Dan LeFevour	Sr
QB	16	Derek Rifenbury	So
QB	18	A.J. Westendorp	Fr
FB	39	Tyler Reed	Jr
FB	47	James Falls	So
RB	5	Tim Phillips	Fr
RB	6	Paris Cotton	So
RB	2	Bryan Schroeder	So
RB	20	Malek Redd	Fr
RB	29	Carl Volny	Jr
RB	34	Zurlon Tipton	Fr

Defense

Pos.	#	Name	Class
DL	15	Sam Williams	Sr
DL	47	Josh Allison	So
DL	49	Daniel Jackson	Fr
DL	53	Aaron McCord	Fr
DL	54	Sean Murnane	Jr
DL	55	Steve Winston	Fr
DL	56	Kashawn Fraser	So
DL	60	Chris Reeves	Fr
DL	72	Cody Pettit	Fr
DL	75	Aaron Kaczmarski	Fr
DL	90	Galen Clemons	Fr
DL	94	John Williams	So
DL	95	Larry Knight	Sr
DL	97	Darryll Stinson	Fr
DL	98	Frank Zombo	Sr
DL	99	Caesar Rodriguez	Fr
LB	17	Tim Brazzel	Sr
LB	23	Derek Carter	So
LB	26	Shamari Benton	Fr
LB	33	Mike Petrucci	So
LB	41	Armond Staten	So
LB	43	Nick Bellore	Jr
LB	45	Landon Carter	So
LB	46	Matt Berning	Jr
LB	47	Kyle Zelinsky	Fr
LB	48	Will Schwarz	Fr
LB	50	Kevin Sweet	Fr
LB	51	Adam Fenton	Fr
LB	52	Alex Smith	Fr
LB	57	Jake Bentley	Fr
LB	59	Shane Torzy	Jr
LB	69	Kyle Torzy	Fr
DB	9	Bobby Seay	Jr
DB	10	Lorenzo White	Fr
DB	12	Eric Fraser	Sr
DB	14	Tommy Mama	Sr
DB	19	Josh Gordy	Sr
DB	21	Gary Jackson	So
DB	22	Vince Agnew	Jr
DB	24	LaVarus Williams	Fr
DB	28	D.J. Scott	Fr
DB	30	Evan Ray	Fr
DB	31	Kirkston Edwards	Sr
DB	38	Jason Johnson	Fr
DB	40	John Carr	So
DB	42	Leron Eaddy	Fr
DB	44	Dannie Bolden	So

Special teams

Pos.	#	Name	Class
P	44	Jake Linklater	Fr
K	36	Andrew Aguila	Sr
K	37	Connor Gagnon	Fr
K	96	Brett Hartman	Jr
K	99	Richie Hogan	Fr
LS	61	Brian Bennyhoff	So
LS	92	Jake Ekkens	Jr
LS	93	Chris Starkey	Jr

Head coach

- Butch Jones (3rd season)

Coordinators/assistant coaches

- Mike Bajakian (Offensive coordinator, 3rd season)
- Tim Banks (Defensive coordinator and secondary coach, 3rd season)
- Zach Azzanni (Assistant head coach and wide receivers coach, 3rd season)
- Steve Stripling (Associate head coach, defense and defensive ends coach, 1st season)
- Jeff Beckles (Running backs coach, 3rd season)
- Mark Elder (Linebackers coach, 3rd season)
- Max Glowacki (Recruiting coordinator and tight ends coach, 3rd season)
- Don Mahoney (Offensive line coach, 3rd season)
- Paul Volero (Special teams coordinator and defensive tackles coach)

Legend

- (C) Team captain
- (S) Suspended
- (I) Ineligible
- Injured
- Redshirt

Roster
Last update: August 21, 2009

== Game summaries ==
=== Arizona ===
	1	2	3	4	Total
Chippewas	0	0	0	6	6
Wildcats	6	7	3	3	19

Scoring summary

1st quarter

- 07:17 ARIZ Zendejas 36-yard field goal 3-0 ARIZ
- 00:00 ARIZ Zendejas 37-yard field goal 6-0 ARIZ

2nd quarter

- 08:20 ARIZ Grigsby 3-yard run (Zendejas kick) 13-0 ARIZ

3rd quarter

- 00:38 ARIZ Zendejas 37-yard field goal 16-0 ARIZ

4th quarter

- 12:21 CMU LeFevour 5-yard run (LeFevour rush failed) 16-6 ARIZ
- 08:45 ARIZ Zendejas 35-yard field goal 19-6 ARIZ

=== Michigan State ===
	1	2	3	4	Total
Chippewas	3	10	0	16	29
Spartans	10	7	3	7	27

Scoring summary

1st quarter

- 13:00 MSU Ray 1 Yd Run (Swenson Kick) 7-0 MSU
- 09:24 CMU Aguila 49 Yd field goal 7-3 MSU
- 03:13 MSU Swenson 39 Yd field goal 10-3 MSU

2nd quarter

- 13:16 CMU Aguila 31 Yd field goal 10-6 MSU
- 05:49 CMU Brown 6 Yd Pass From LeFevour (Aguila Kick) 13-10 CMU
- 04:16 MSU Gantt 16 Yd Pass From Nichol (Swenson Kick) 17-13 MSU

3rd quarter

- 02:33 MSU Swenson 32 Yd field goal 20-13 MSU

4th quarter

- 14:24 CMU Poblah 12 Yd Pass From LeFevour (Aguila Kick) 20-20
- 07:33 MSU Cunningham 7 Yd Pass From Cousins (Swenson Kick) 27-20 MSU
- 00:32 CMU Cotton 11 Yd Pass From LeFevour (Two-Point Conversion Failed) 27-26 MSU
- 00:03 CMU Aguila 42 Yd field goal 29-27 CMU

=== Alcorn State ===
	1	2	3	4	Total
Braves	0	0	0	0	0
Chippewas	10	24	14	0	48

Scoring summary

1st quarter

- 07:36 CMU Aguila 23-yard field goal CMU 3-0
- 05:56 CMU Brown 55-yard punt return (Aguila kick) CMU 10-0

2nd quarter

- 14:51 CMU LeFevour 10-yard run (Aguila kick) CMU 17-0
- 11:54 CMU Phillips 2-yard run (Aguila kick) CMU 24-0
- 09:12 CMU LeFevour 1-yard run (Aguila kick) CMU 31-0
- 05:06 CMU Aguila 32-yard field goal CMU 34-0

3rd quarter

- 14:00 CMU Volny 5-yard run (Aguila kick) CMU 41-0
- 00:59 CMU Volny 2-yard run (Hartmann kick) CMU 48-0

4th quarter

=== Akron ===
	1	2	3	4	Total
Zips	0	7	7	7	21
Chippewas	13	21	7	7	48

Scoring summary

1st quarter

- 7:11 CMU Wilson 27-yard pass from LeFevour (Aguila kick) 0-7 CMU
- 5:21 CMU Poblah 4-yard pass from LeFevour (Aguila kick failed) 0-13 CMU

2nd quarter

- 14:39 CMU LeFevour 1-yard run (Aguila kick) 0-20 CMU
- 9:59 AKRON Rodgers 10-yard run (Iveljic kick) 7-20 CMU
- 6:47 CMU LeFevour 2-yard run (Aguila kick) 7-27 CMU
- 1:02 CMU Brown 9-yard pass from LeFevour (Aguila kick) 7-34 CMU

3rd quarter

- 8:42 AKRON Rodgers 1-yard run (Iveljic kick) 14-34 CMU
- 3:40 CMU Brown 13-yard pass from LeFevour (Aguila kick) 14-41 CMU

4th quarter

- 9:42 CMU Cotton 3-yard run (Aguila kick) 14-48 CMU
- 6:19 AKRON Tuzze 9-yard run (Iveljic kick) 21-48 CMU

=== Buffalo ===
	1	2	3	4	Total
Chippewas	7	6	7	0	20
Bulls	0	10	3	0	13

=== Eastern Michigan ===
	1	2	3	4	Total
Eagles	0	0	0	8	8
Chippewas	14	21	14	7	56

Scoring summary

1st quarter

- 08:51 CMU Brown 70-yard pass from LeFevour (Aguila kick) 0-7 CMU
- 03:58 CMU LeFevour 1-yard run (Aguila kick) 0-14 CMU

2nd quarter

- 12:33 CMU LeFevour 1-yard run (Aguila kick) 0-21 CMU
- 02:51 CMU Brown 75-yard punt return (Aguila kick) 0-28 CMU
- 00:18 CMU Schroeder 11-yard pass from LeFevour (Aguila kick) 0-35 CMU

3rd quarter

- 12:50 CMU Poblah 25-yard pass from LeFevour (Aguila kick) 0-42 CMU
- 01:57 CMU LeFevour 5-yard run (Aguila kick) 0-49 CMU

4th quarter

- 11:25 EMU Welch 1-yard run (Gillett rush) 8-49 CMU
- 07:36 CMU Volny 3-yard run (Aguila kick) 8-56 CMU

=== Western Michigan ===
	1	2	3	4	Total
Chippewas	10	17	0	7	34
Broncos	3	10	3	7	23

=== Bowling Green ===
	1	2	3	4	Total
Chippewas	7	7	3	7	24
Falcons	0	10	0	0	10

Scoring summary

1st quarter

- 11:04 CMU Brown 4-yard run (Aguila kick) 7-0 CMU

2nd quarter

- 11:26 BGSU Barnes 24-yard pass from Sheehan (Norsic kick) 7-7
- 9:16 CMU Brown 29-yard pass from LeFevour (Aguila kick) 14-7 CMU
- 0:06 BGSU Norsic 40-yard field goal 14-10 CMU

3rd quarter

- 11:34 CMU Aguila 38-yard field goal 17-10 CMU

4th quarter

- 10:02 CMU Anderson 9-yard pass from LeFevour (Aguila kick) 24-10 CMU

=== Boston College ===
	1	2	3	4	Total
Chippewas	0	3	0	7	10
Eagles	0	7	17	7	31

Scoring summary

2nd quarter

- 6:09 CMU Aguila 34-yard field goal 3-0 CMU
- 0:50 BC Harris 3-yard run (Aponavicius kick) 3-7 BC

3rd quarter

- 12:03 BC Gunnell 41-yard pass from Shinskie (Aponavicius kick) 3-14 BC
- 6:35 BC Harris 3-yard run (Aponavicius kick) 3-21 BC
- 1:44 BC Aponavicius 18-yard field goal 3-24 BC

4th quarter

- 5:00 BC Kuechly 28-yard interception return (Aponavicius kick) 3-31 BC
- 0:35 CMU Radcliff 11-yard run (Aguila kick) 10-31 BC

=== Toledo ===
	1	2	3	4	Total
Rockets	7	7	0	14	28
Chippewas	7	28	14	7	56

=== Ball State ===
	1	2	3	4	Total
Chippewas	7	14	14	0	35
Cardinals	0	3	0	0	3

=== Northern Illinois ===
	1	2	3	4	Total
Huskies	0	10	0	21	31
Chippewas	10	14	14	7	45

=== Ohio ===
	1	2	3	4	Total
Bobcats	7	0	3	0	10
Chippewas	10	7	3	0	20

=== Troy ===
	1	2	3	4	OT	2OT	Total
Chippewas	3	6	10	15	7	3	44
Trojans	7	3	14	10	7	0	41

This was the first ever meeting between these two teams.
