= 2009 Toledo Rockets football team =

American college football season

2009 Toledo Rockets football
- Conference: Mid-American Conference
- West
- Record: 5–7 (3–5 MAC)
- Head coach: Tim Beckman (1st season)
- Co-offensive coordinator: Matt Campbell (1st season)
- Offensive scheme: Spread
- Co-defensive coordinators: Mike Ward (1st season); Paul Nichols (1st season)
- Base defense: 4–2–5
- Home stadium: Glass Bowl

2009 Mid-American Conference football standings
	Conf.			Overall
Team	W		L	W		L
East Division
Ohio xy	7	–	1	9	–	5
Temple x	7	–	1	9	–	4
Bowling Green	6	–	2	7	–	6
Kent State	4	–	4	5	–	7
Buffalo	3	–	5	5	–	7
Akron	2	–	6	3	–	9
Miami (OH)	1	–	7	1	–	11
West Division
No. 23 Central Michigan x$	8	–	0	12	–	2
Northern Illinois	5	–	3	7	–	6
Western Michigan	4	–	4	5	–	7
Toledo	3	–	5	5	–	7
Ball State	2	–	6	2	–	10
Eastern Michigan	0	–	8	0	–	12
Championship: Central Michigan 20, Ohio 10
$ – Conference champion; x – Division champion/co-champions; y – Championship game participant; Rankings from AP Poll

The 2009 Toledo Rockets football team represented The University of Toledo during the 2009 NCAA Division I FBS football season and as a member of the Mid-American Conference (MAC) East Division. The team was coached by Tim Beckman and played their homes game in the Glass Bowl. The finished with a record of 5–7 (3–5 MAC).

== Before the season ==
=== Recruiting ===
College recruiting (2009)
Name	Hometown	School	Height	Weight	40^{‡}	Commit date
Manny Bell; OL	Pittsburgh, PA	Schenley HS	6 ft 6 in (1.98 m)	275 lb (125 kg)	-	Feb 2, 2009
Manny Bell; OL	Recruit ratings: Scout: Rivals: (40)					
Robert Bell; LB	Grand Rapids, MI	East Grand Rapids HS	5 ft 11 in (1.80 m)	225 lb (102 kg)	-	Jan 26, 2009
Robert Bell; LB	Recruit ratings: Scout: Rivals: (40)					
Julian Bellinger; WR	Lithonia, GA	Lithonia HS	6 ft 1 in (1.85 m)	175 lb (79 kg)	-	Feb 4, 2009
Julian Bellinger; WR	Recruit ratings: Scout: Rivals: (40)					
Byron Best; DB	Greenwood, SC	Greenwood HS	5 ft 10 in (1.78 m)	180 lb (82 kg)	4.4	Feb 4, 2009
Byron Best; DB	Recruit ratings: Scout: Rivals: (73)					
Ryan Casano; K	Costa Mesa, CA	Orange Coast	5 ft 9 in (1.75 m)	180 lb (82 kg)	-	Feb 4, 2009
Ryan Casano; K	Recruit ratings: Scout: Rivals:					
Austin Dantin; QB	Tallahassee, FL	Leon HS	6 ft 1 in (1.85 m)	175 lb (79 kg)	-	Feb 4, 2009
Austin Dantin; QB	Recruit ratings: Scout: Rivals: (73)					
T.J. Fatinikun; DE	Perrysburg, OH	Perrysburg HS	6 ft 1 in (1.85 m)	220 lb (100 kg)	4.83	Feb 4, 2009
T.J. Fatinikun; DE	Recruit ratings: Scout: Rivals: (40)					
Leroy Houston; RB	N/A	Seabreeze Senior H.S.	5 ft 11 in (1.80 m)	180 lb (82 kg)	-	
Leroy Houston; RB	Recruit ratings: (70)					
Zac Kerin; OL	Delaware, OH	Olentangy HS	6 ft 4 in (1.93 m)	265 lb (120 kg)	-	Feb 4, 2009
Zac Kerin; OL	Recruit ratings: Scout: Rivals: (40)					
Dan Molls; LB	Parma, OH	Padua Franciscan HS	6 ft 1 in (1.85 m)	212 lb (96 kg)	4.57	Jan 24, 2009
Dan Molls; LB	Recruit ratings: Scout: Rivals: (72)					
Terrence Owens; QB	Cleveland, OH	Glenville HS	6 ft 3 in (1.91 m)	160 lb (73 kg)	4.65	Jan 30, 2009
Terrence Owens; QB	Recruit ratings: Scout: Rivals: (74)					
Eric Page; DB	Holland, OH	Springfield HS	5 ft 10 in (1.78 m)	160 lb (73 kg)	4.5	Nov 16, 2008
Eric Page; DB	Recruit ratings: Scout: Rivals: (76)					
Ben Pike; DE	Mentor, OH	Mentor HS	6 ft 3 in (1.91 m)	245 lb (111 kg)	-	Feb 4, 2009
Ben Pike; DE	Recruit ratings: Scout: Rivals: (40)					
Darius Reeves; CB	N/A	Lincoln H.S.	6 ft 1 in (1.85 m)	180 lb (82 kg)	-	
Darius Reeves; CB	Recruit ratings: (66)					
Johnie Roberts; DT	Hattiesburg, MS	Pearl River	6 ft 3 in (1.91 m)	290 lb (130 kg)	4.9	Feb 4, 2009
Johnie Roberts; DT	Recruit ratings: Scout: Rivals:					
Jermaine Robinson; DB	New Berlin, NY	Milford Academy	6 ft 2 in (1.88 m)	165 lb (75 kg)	4.5	Dec 13, 2008
Jermaine Robinson; DB	Recruit ratings: Scout: Rivals: (76)					
Christian Smith; DE	Oklahoma City, OK	Carl Albert HS	6 ft 1 in (1.85 m)	226 lb (103 kg)	4.65	Feb 4, 2009
Christian Smith; DE	Recruit ratings: Scout: Rivals: (40)					
Troy Smith; DB	Indianapolis, IN	Pike HS	5 ft 10 in (1.78 m)	175 lb (79 kg)	4.4	Jan 29, 2009
Troy Smith; DB	Recruit ratings: Scout: Rivals: (40)					
Ben Steele; DT	Venice, FL	Venice Senior HS	6 ft 4 in (1.93 m)	260 lb (120 kg)	-	Feb 4, 2009
Ben Steele; DT	Recruit ratings: Scout: Rivals: (40)					
Ricky Steele; DB	Cincinnati, OH	La Salle HS	6 ft 1 in (1.85 m)	185 lb (84 kg)	-	Feb 4, 2009
Ricky Steele; DB	Recruit ratings: Scout: Rivals: (68)					
Daxton Swanson; DB	Waco, TX	La Vega HS	5 ft 10 in (1.78 m)	161 lb (73 kg)	4.42	Feb 4, 2009
Daxton Swanson; DB	Recruit ratings: Scout: Rivals: (40)					
Edward Williams; WR	Tampa, FL	Alonso HS	6 ft 2 in (1.88 m)	188 lb (85 kg)	-	Feb 4, 2009
Edward Williams; WR	Recruit ratings: Scout: Rivals: (40)					
Overall recruit ranking: Scout: 113 Rivals: 86
‡ Refers to 40-yard dash; Note: In many cases, Scout, Rivals, 247Sports, On3, and ESPN may conflict in their listings of height, weight and 40 time.; In these cases, the average was taken. ESPN grades are on a 100-point scale.; Sources: "Toledo Commit List for 2009". Rivals.; "Football Recruiting: Toledo". Scout.; "Toledo Football Recruiting 2009". ESPN.; "Scout.com Team Recruiting Rankings". Scout.; "2009 Team Ranking". Rivals.com.

== Schedule ==
Date	Time	Opponent	Site	TV	Result	Attendance
September 5	12:00 p.m.	at Purdue*	Ross–Ade Stadium; West Lafayette, IN	BTN	L 31–52	47,551
September 11	9:00 p.m.	Colorado*	Glass Bowl; Toledo, OH	ESPN	W 54–38	20,082
September 19	12:00 p.m.	vs. No. 11 Ohio State*	Cleveland Browns Stadium; Cleveland, OH (Patriot Bowl)	ESPN+	L 0–38	71,727
September 26	7:00 p.m.	at Florida International*	FIU Stadium; Miami, FL		W 41–31	11,047
October 3	12:00 p.m.	at Ball State	Scheumann Stadium; Muncie, IN	ESPN+	W 37–30	14,140
October 10	7:00 p.m.	Western Michigan	Glass Bowl; Toledo, OH		L 26–58	18,029
October 17	7:00 p.m.	Northern Illinois	Glass Bowl; Toledo, OH		W 20–19	17,012
October 24	7:00 p.m.	Temple	Glass Bowl; Toledo, OH		L 24–40	16,334
October 31	3:30 p.m.	at Miami (OH)	Yager Stadium; Oxford, OH	ONN	L 24–31	8,757
November 11	8:00 p.m.	at Central Michigan	Kelly/Shorts Stadium; Mount Pleasant, MI	ESPN2	L 28–56	18,310
November 20	7:00 p.m.	Eastern Michigan	Glass Bowl; Toledo, OH		W 47–21	9,967
November 27	2:00 pm	at Bowling Green	Doyt Perry Stadium; Bowling Green, OH (Battle of I-75)		L 24–38	14,075
*Non-conference game; Rankings from Coaches' Poll released prior to the game; All times are in Eastern time

== Roster ==
As of 2009-08-21
Wide receivers: 11 Youngs, Cielan – (redshirt) freshman; 7 Stafford, Kenny – sophomore; 10 Pasquale, David – (redshirt) freshman; 12 Page, Eric – freshman; 24 Thomas, Adonis – sophomore; 26 Davidson, Jimmy – (redshirt) freshman; 47 Rogers, Matt – (redshirt) freshman; 80 Cortazzo, Tim – sophomore; 83 Bellinger, Julian – freshman; 84 Gaymon, Sam – (redshirt) freshman; 85 Bailey, Robin – senior; 87 Williams, Edward – freshman; 88 Williams, Stephen – senior; Offensive line: 50 Garrett, Buster – senior; 60 Lindeman, A.J. – sophomore; 62 Meenan, Chris – junior; 65 Cole, Nate – junior; 68 DeWalt, Jared – senior; 69 Kowalski, Kevin – junior; 70 Morookian, John – sophomore; 71 Farr, Danny – (redshirt) freshman; 73 Rubin, Matt – sophomore; 74 VanDerMeulen, Mike – sophomore; 75 Bell, Manny – freshman; 76 Gewont, Jan – sophomore; 77 Kerin, Zac – freshman; 78 Manley, Phillipkeith – sophomore; 79 Farha, Fadi – (redshirt) freshman; Tight ends: 81 Burzine, Tom – senior; 82 Fought, Matt – junior; 86 Noble, Danny – sophomore; 94 Jones, Jerome – sophomore; 95 Strait, Jared – (redshirt) freshman	Quarterbacks: 2 Owens, Terrance – freshman; 4 Dantin, Austin – freshman; 1 Opelt, Aaron – senior; 14 Pettee, Alex – junior; Running backs: 6 Walker, Jake – sophomore; 22 Collins, DaJuane – senior; 23 Williams, Morgan – sophomore; 27 Reeves, Darius – freshman; 29 Bush, Johnnie – sophomore; Defensive line: 23 Fatinikun, T.J. – freshman; 30 Pike, Ben – freshman; 40 Johnson, Alex – junior; 41 Shumaker, Matt – senior; 46 Keighley, Hank – sophomore; 51 Willis, Terrell – junior; 52 Lamb, Johnathan – sophomore; 56 Summers, Derrick – senior; 58 Westbrook, Douglas – junior; 89 Constant, Skylaar – senior; 92 Steele, Ben – freshman; 94 Roberts, Johnie - Unknown; 96 Washington, Levone – sophomore; 97 Riley, Malcolm – sophomore; 98 Hill, Maurice – senior; 84x Smith, Christian – freshman	Linebackers: 32 Molls, Dan – freshman; 33 Quinn, Daris – senior; 36 McIntosh, Damien – sophomore; 38 Bell, Robert – freshman; 42 Donald, Archie – junior; 48 Brudzinski, Beau – senior; Defensive backs: 3 Marrow, Desmond – junior; 5 Swanson, Daxton – freshman; 8 Church, Barry – senior; 9 Veal, Kenny – sophomore; 13 Washington, Anthony – sophomore; 19 Bates, Joe – senior; 20 Faison, Chris – senior; 21 Ashwood, Andreas – sophomore; 26 Best, Byron – freshman; 31 Shuler, Joe – junior; 34 Richmond, Lester – senior; 35 King, Anthony – junior; 37 Atkins, Walter – senior; 43 Singer, Mark – sophomore; 44 Pree, Drey'Lon – junior; 45 Ballard, Isaiah – sophomore; 47 Veasley-Pettis, Myshan – junior; 49 Anderson, Terrell – sophomore; 11x Steele, Richard – freshman; 26x Schebek, Joe – (redshirt) freshman; 29x Robinson, Jermaine – freshman; 24 Freeman, Tim– sophomore; Punters: 2 Claus, Bill – sophomore; Kickers: 3 Casano, Ryan – sophomore; 8 Weber, Andrew – sophomore; 25 Brodbeck, Brett – junior; 85 Steigerwald, Alex – senior; Long snapper: 93 McHugh, Colin – sophomore
† Starter at position * Injured; will not play in 2009.

== Coaching staff ==
Name	Position	Year at school
Tim Beckman	Head coach	1st
Mike Ward	Assistant head coach Defensive run coordinator Linebackers coach	1st
Matt Campbell	Offensive run-game coordinator Offensive line coach	1st
Jason Candle	Slot receivers Tight ends coach	1st
Steven Clinkscale	Cornerbacks coach	1st
Alex Golesh	Running backs coach Recruiting coordinator	1st
Jason Nichols	Outside receivers coach	1st
Paul Nichols	Defensive pass coordinator Safeties coach	1st
Eli Rasheed	Defensive line coach	1st
Scott Satterfield	Passing coordinator Quarterbacks coach	1st

== Game summaries ==
=== Purdue ===
	1	2	3	4	Total
Rockets	0	14	7	10	31
Boilermakers	14	17	14	7	52

Scoring summary

1st Quarter

- 13:48 PUR Bolden 78-yard run (Wiggs kick) 7-0 PUR
- 04:14 PUR Taylor 43-yard run (Wiggs kick) 14-0 PUR

2nd Quarter

- 13:53 PUR Smith 11-yard pass from Elliott (Wiggs kick) 21-0 PUR
- 11:17 TOLEDO Youngs 34-yard pass from Opelt (Steigerwald kick) 21-7 PUR
- 05:40 TOLEDO Williams 9-yard pass from Opelt (Steigerwald kick) 21-14 PUR
- 01:25 PUR Carlos 24-yard pass from Elliott (Wiggs kick) 28-14 PUR
- 00:00 PUR Wiggs 59-yard field goal 31-14 PUR

3rd Quarter

- 12:05 PUR Taylor 1-yard run (Wiggs kick) 38-14 PUR
- 08:09 PUR Edison 15-yard pass from Elliott (Wiggs kick) 45-14 PUR
- 04:41 TOLEDO Collins 5-yard run (Steigerwald kick) 45-21 PUR

4th Quarter

- 11:37 TOLEDO Steigerwald 48-yard field goal 45-24 PUR
- 06:36 TOLEDO Williams 42-yard pass from Opelt (Steigerwald kick) 45-31 PUR
- 02:27 PUR Bolden 14-yard run (Wiggs kick) 52-31 PUR

=== Colorado ===
	1	2	3	4	Total
Buffaloes	0	3	21	14	38
Rockets	13	10	14	17	54

Scoring summary

1st Quarter

- 07:18 TOLEDO Noble 8-yard pass from Opelt (Claus pass failed) 6-0 TOLEDO
- 03:00 TOLEDO Youngs 70-yard pass from Opelt (Steigerwald kick) 13-0 TOLEDO

2nd Quarter

- 13:31 CU Goodman 32-yard field goal 13-3 TOLEDO
- 09:59 TOLEDO Steigerwald 50-yard field goal 16-3 TOLEDO
- 00:36 TOLEDO Opelt 27-yard run (Steigerwald kick) 23-3 TOLEDO

3rd Quarter

- 12:36 TOLEDO Stafford 26-yard pass from Opelt (Steigerwald kick) 30-3 TOLEDO
- 07:26 CU McKnight 4-yard pass from Hawkins (Goodman kick) 30-10 TOLEDO
- 04:51 TOLEDO Burzine 23-yard pass from Opelt (Steigerwald kick) 30-10 TOLEDO
- 01:43 CU Espinoza 5-yard pass from Hawkins (Goodman kick) 37-17 TOLEDO
- 01:23 CU Geer 4-yard pass from Hawkins (Goodman kick) 37-24 TOLEDO

4th Quarter

- 14:10 TOLEDO Opelt 61-yard run (Steigerwald kick) 44-24 TOLEDO
- 08:41 TOLEDO Collins 23-yard run (Steigerwald kick) 51-24 TOLEDO
- 04:01 TOLEDO Steigerwald 43-yard field goal 54-24 TOLEDO
- 02:56 CU Devenny 18-yard pass from Hawkins (Goodman kick) 54-31 TOLEDO
- 01:53 CU Hawkins 12-yard run (Goodman kick) 54-38 TOLEDO

=== Ohio State ===
	1	2	3	4	Total
Buckeyes	14	10	7	7	38
Rockets	0	0	0	0	0

Scoring summary

1st Quarter

- 13:13 OSU Sanzenbacher 76-yard pass from Pryor (Pettrey kick) 7-0 OSU
- 05:51 OSU Sanzenbacher 18-yard pass from Pryor (Pettrey kick) 14-0 OSU

2nd Quarter

- 12:31 OSU Herron 4-yard run (Pettrey kick) 21-0 OSU
- 00:00 OSU Pettrey 47-yard field goal 24-0 OSU

3rd Quarter

- 07:59 OSU Pryor 1-yard run (Pettrey kick) 31-0 OSU

4th Quarter

- 07:10 OSU Posey 4-yard pass from Pryor (Pettrey kick) 38-0 OSU

=== Florida International ===
	1	2	3	4	Total
Rockets	14	3	7	17	41
Golden Panthers	0	3	14	14	31

=== Ball State ===
	1	2	3	4	Total
Rockets	7	7	0	23	37
Cardinals	6	7	3	14	30

=== Western Michigan ===
	1	2	3	4	Total
Broncos	20	21	10	7	58
Rockets	6	6	7	7	26

Scoring summary

1st Quarter

- 13:51 WMU White 54-yard pass from Hiller (Potter kick) 7-0 WMU
- 10:59 WMU White 19-yard pass from Hiller (Potter kick) 14-0 WMU
- 09:54 WMU Nunez 12-yard pass from West (Potter kick failed) 20-0 WMU
- 08:20 TOLEDO Steigerwald 21-yard field goal 20-3 WMU
- 02:33 TOLEDO Steigerwald 40-yard field goal 20-6 WMU

2nd Quarter

- 14:49 WMU West 15-yard run (Potter kick) 27-6 WMU
- 12:03 WMU Nunez 2-yard pass from Hiller (Potter kick) 34-6 WMU
- 04:59 WMU West 19-yard run (Potter kick) 41-6 WMU
- 00:08 TOLEDO Page 6-yard pass from Dantin (Claus pass failed) 41-12 WMU

3rd Quarter

- 14:36 WMU West 70-yard run (Potter kick) 48-12 WMU
- 06:14 WMU Potter 37-yard field goal 51-12 WMU
- 00:16 TOLEDO Williams 18-yard pass from Dantin (Steigerwald kick) 51-19 WMU

4th Quarter

- 06:12 TOLEDO Shumaker 8-yard pass from Dantin (Steigerwald kick) 51-26 WMU
- 04:58 WMU Thompson 29-yard run (Potter kick) 58-26 WMU

=== Northern Illinois ===
	1	2	3	4	Total
Huskies	0	6	7	6	19
Rockets	7	7	0	6	20

=== Temple ===
	1	2	3	4	Total
Owls	13	10	10	7	40
Rockets	7	10	0	7	24

Scoring summary

1st Quarter

- 11:43 TEMPLE Campbell 11-yard pass from Charlton (McManus kick blocked) 6-0 TEMPLE
- 6:49 TEMPLE Pierce 1-yard run (McManus kick) 13-0 TEMPLE
- 6:36 TOLEDO Williams 85 yards kickoff return (Steigerwald kick) 13-7 TEMPLE

2nd Quarter

- 12:58 TEMPLE Pierce 39-yard run (McManus kick) 20-7 TEMPLE
- 9:58 TEMPLE McManus 30-yard field goal 23-7 TEMPLE
- 6:16 TOLEDO Steigerwald 48-yard field goal 23-10 TEMPLE
- 0:38 TOLEDO Collins 6-yard run (Steigerwald kick) 23-17 TEMPLE

3rd Quarter

- 9:26 TEMPLE Pierce 2-yard run (McManus kick) 30-17 TEMPLE
- 4:16 TEMPLE McManus 29-yard field goal 33-17 TEMPLE

4th Quarter

- 11:00 TEMPLE Harper 36-yard pass from Charlton 40-17 TEMPLE
- 3:02 TOLEDO Youngs 27-yard pass from Pettee (Steigerwald kick) 40-24 TEMPLE

=== Miami (OH) ===
	1	2	3	4	Total
Rockets	7	0	17	0	24
RedHawks	7	17	7	0	31

=== Central Michigan ===
	1	2	3	4	Total
Rockets	7	7	0	14	28
Chippewas	7	28	14	7	56

=== Eastern Michigan ===
	1	2	3	4	Total
Eagles	0	14	7	0	21
Rockets	3	23	7	14	47

=== Bowling Green ===
	1	2	3	4	Total
Rockets	0	14	3	7	24
Falcons	24	0	0	14	38
