= 2009 Buffalo Bulls football team =

American college football season

2009 Buffalo Bulls football
- Conference: Mid-American Conference
- East Division
- Record: 5–7 (5–3 MAC)
- Head coach: Turner Gill (4th season)
- Defensive coordinator: Fred Reed (1st season)
- Captains: Mike Newton; Naaman Roosevelt; James Starks; Davonte Shannon; Andrew West
- Home stadium: University at Buffalo Stadium

2009 Mid-American Conference football standings
	Conf.			Overall
Team	W		L	W		L
East Division
Ohio xy	7	–	1	9	–	5
Temple x	7	–	1	9	–	4
Bowling Green	6	–	2	7	–	6
Kent State	4	–	4	5	–	7
Buffalo	3	–	5	5	–	7
Akron	2	–	6	3	–	9
Miami (OH)	1	–	7	1	–	11
West Division
No. 23 Central Michigan x$	8	–	0	12	–	2
Northern Illinois	5	–	3	7	–	6
Western Michigan	4	–	4	5	–	7
Toledo	3	–	5	5	–	7
Ball State	2	–	6	2	–	10
Eastern Michigan	0	–	8	0	–	12
Championship: Central Michigan 20, Ohio 10
$ – Conference champion; x – Division champion/co-champions; y – Championship game participant; Rankings from AP Poll

The 2009 Buffalo Bulls football team represented the University at Buffalo as a member of the Mid-American Conference (MAC) during the 2009 NCAA Division I FBS football season. Led by Turner Gill in his fourth and final season as head coach, the Bulls compiled an overall record of 5–7 with a mark of 3–5 in conference play, placing fifth in the MAC's East Division. The team played home games at the University at Buffalo Stadium in Amherst, New York.

The season got off to a bad start for the Bulls as star running back James Starks injured the labrum in his left shoulder in a preseason scrimmage. It was determined that he would need surgery and miss the whole year. Because he was redshirted his first year at Buffalo, he was able to play again for the Bulls. Buffalo's offense struggled to overcome the loss of Starks and the up-and-down play of new starting quarterback Zach Maynard, while the defense continued to have a hard time stopping opposing teams and could not generate as many turnovers as they did in 2008. Buffalo was out of MAC championship contention midway through the season, but finished with two straight wins on the road.

After the season, Gill accepted an offer to become the head football coach at the University of Kansas. Gill was replaced by Jeff Quinn.

== Schedule ==
Date	Time	Opponent	Site	TV	Result	Attendance	Source
September 5	9:00 pm	at UTEP*	Sun Bowl; El Paso, TX	CBSSN	W 23–17	35,213	
September 12	12:00 pm	Pittsburgh*	University at Buffalo Stadium; Amherst, NY	ESPN Plus	L 27–54	21,870	
September 19	7:30 pm	at UCF*	Bright House Networks Stadium; Orlando, FL	Bright House Sports Network	L 17–23	33,689	
September 26	12:00 pm	at Temple	Lincoln Financial Field; Philadelphia, PA	ESPN Plus	L 13–37	13,949	
October 3	3:30 pm	Central Michigan	University at Buffalo Stadium; Amherst, NY	TWCSN	L 13–20	18,092	
October 10	3:30 pm	Gardner–Webb*^{†}	University at Buffalo Stadium; Amherst, NY	TWCSN	W 40–3	15,812	
October 17	3:30 pm	Akron	University at Buffalo Stadium; Amherst, NY	TWCSN, Fox Sports Ohio	W 21–17	13,750	
October 24	2:00 pm	at Western Michigan	Waldo Stadium; Kalamazoo, MI		L 31–34 ^{OT}	12,924	
November 3	7:00 pm	Bowling Green	University at Buffalo Stadium; Amherst, NY	ESPN2	L 29–30	13,202	
November 10	7:00 pm	Ohio	University at Buffalo Stadium; Amherst, NY	ESPN2	L 24–27	13,032	
November 18	6:00 pm	at Miami (OH)	Yager Stadium; Oxford, OH	ESPNU	W 42–17	7,983	
November 27	2:00 pm	at Kent State	Dix Stadium; Kent, OH		W 9–6	15,131	
*Non-conference game; ^{†}Homecoming; All times are in Eastern time

== Recruiting ==
Name	Position	Height	Weight	Hometown
Jevin Colbert	Defensive back	6'1"	170	Arlington, TX
Alex Dennison	Quarterback	6'2"	210	Irwin, PA
Jibrille Fewell	Defensive tackle	6'1"	270	Rock Hill, SC
Peter Gagliardi	Fullback	6'3"	235	Miami, FL
Jeffvon Gill	Running back	5'11"	195	Euclid, OH
Jimmy Gordon	Tight end	6'4"	250	Patchogue, NY
Matt Hornbuckle	Defensive Line	6'1"	270	Colleyville, TX
Jeremy Johnson	Offensive Line	6'5"	310	Springfield, OH
Bunduka Kargbo	Safety	6'1"	205	Albany, NY
Carlos Lammons	Cornerback	5'9"	185	Pahokee, FL
Fred Lee	Wide Receiver	6'1"	200	Chester, SC
Khalil Mack	Linebacker	6'3"	220	Fort Pierce, FL
Alex Neutz	Wide Receiver	6'3"	190	Grand Island, NY
Branden Oliver	Running back	5'8"	185	Miami, FL
Rick Perez	Center	6'2"	275	Miami, FL
Jake Reeder	Tight End	6'4"	250	State College, PA
Kenny Scott	Defensive Line	6'1"	300	Anderson, SC
Nick Sizemore	Fullback	6'2"	235	Lititz, PA
Albert Sparks	Defensive Tackle	6'3"	310	Irving, TX
Darius Willis	Linebacker	6'3"	240	Houston, TX
Pat Wilson	Offensive Line	6'5"	270	East Aurora, NY

== After the season ==
=== NFL draft ===
The following Bull was selected in the 2010 NFL draft following the season.

Round	Pick	Player	Position	NFL club
6	193	James Starks	Running back	Green Bay Packers
