= 2009 Northern Illinois Huskies football team =

American college football season

2009 Northern Illinois Huskies football

International Bowl, L 3–27 vs. South Florida
- Conference: Mid-American Conference
- West Division
- Record: 7–6 (5–3 MAC)
- Head coach: Jerry Kill (2nd season)
- Offensive coordinator: Matt Limegrover (2nd season)
- Defensive coordinator: Tracy Claeys (2nd season)
- MVPs: Chad Spann; Jake Coffman
- Captains: Eddie Adamski; Brandon Bice; David Bryant; Jake Coffman; Landon Cox; Cory Hanson; Chandler Harnish; Jason Onyebuagu
- Home stadium: Huskie Stadium

2009 Mid-American Conference football standings
	Conf.			Overall
Team	W		L	W		L
East Division
Ohio xy	7	–	1	9	–	5
Temple x	7	–	1	9	–	4
Bowling Green	6	–	2	7	–	6
Kent State	4	–	4	5	–	7
Buffalo	3	–	5	5	–	7
Akron	2	–	6	3	–	9
Miami (OH)	1	–	7	1	–	11
West Division
No. 23 Central Michigan x$	8	–	0	12	–	2
Northern Illinois	5	–	3	7	–	6
Western Michigan	4	–	4	5	–	7
Toledo	3	–	5	5	–	7
Ball State	2	–	6	2	–	10
Eastern Michigan	0	–	8	0	–	12
Championship: Central Michigan 20, Ohio 10
$ – Conference champion; x – Division champion/co-champions; y – Championship game participant; Rankings from AP Poll

The 2009 Northern Illinois Huskies football team represented Northern Illinois University as a member of the West Division of the Mid-American Conference (MAC) during the 2009 NCAA Division I FBS football season. Led by second-year head coach Jerry Kill, the Huskies compiled an overall record of 7–6 with a mark of 5–3 in conference play, placing second in the MAC's West Division. Northern Illinois was invited to the International Bowl, where they lost to South Florida . The team played home games at Huskie Stadium in DeKalb, Illinois.

== Schedule ==
Date	Time	Opponent	Site	TV	Result	Attendance	Source
September 5	6:00 pm	at Wisconsin*	Camp Randall Stadium; Madison, WI	BTN	L 20–28	80,532	
September 12	6:30 pm	Western Illinois*	Huskie Stadium; DeKalb, IL	CSNC	W 41–7	21,427	
September 19	11:00 am	at Purdue*	Ross–Ade Stadium; West Lafayette, IN	BTN	W 28–21	53,240	
September 26	2:30 pm	Idaho*	Huskie Stadium; DeKalb, IL	CSNC	L 31–34	16,320	
October 3	2:30 pm	Western Michigan^{†}	Huskie Stadium; DeKalb, IL	CSNC	W 38–3	17,608	
October 17	6:00 pm	at Toledo	Glass Bowl; Toledo, OH		L 19–20	17,012	
October 24	12:00 pm	at Miami (OH)	Yager Stadium; Oxford, OH		W 27–22	9,884	
October 31	11:00 am	Akron	Huskie Stadium; DeKalb, IL	ESPN Plus	W 27–10	10,148	
November 5	6:30 pm	Eastern Michigan	Huskie Stadium; DeKalb, IL	ESPNU	W 50–6	10,527	
November 12	5:00 pm	Ball State	Huskie Stadium; DeKalb, IL (Bronze Stalk Trophy)	ESPNU	W 26–20	13,305	
November 21	1:00 pm	at Ohio	Peden Stadium; Athens, OH		L 31–38	14,756	
November 27	12:00 pm	at Central Michigan	Kelly/Shorts Stadium; Mount Pleasant, MI	ESPNU	L 31–45	15,113	
January 2	12:00 pm	vs. South Florida*	Rogers Centre; Toronto, ON (International Bowl)	ESPN2	L 3–27	22,185	
*Non-conference game; ^{†}Homecoming; All times are in Central time
