= 2009 Akron Zips football team =

American college football season

2009 Akron Zips football
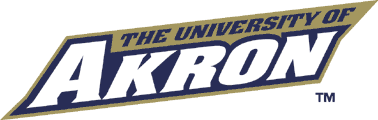
- Conference: Mid-American Conference
- East
- Record: 3–9 (2–6 MAC)
- Head coach: J. D. Brookhart (6th season)
- Offensive coordinator: Shane Montgomery (1st season)
- Defensive coordinator: Jim Fleming (6th season)
- Home stadium: InfoCision Stadium–Summa Field

2009 Mid-American Conference football standings
	Conf.			Overall
Team	W		L	W		L
East Division
Ohio xy	7	–	1	9	–	5
Temple x	7	–	1	9	–	4
Bowling Green	6	–	2	7	–	6
Kent State	4	–	4	5	–	7
Buffalo	3	–	5	5	–	7
Akron	2	–	6	3	–	9
Miami (OH)	1	–	7	1	–	11
West Division
No. 23 Central Michigan x$	8	–	0	12	–	2
Northern Illinois	5	–	3	7	–	6
Western Michigan	4	–	4	5	–	7
Toledo	3	–	5	5	–	7
Ball State	2	–	6	2	–	10
Eastern Michigan	0	–	8	0	–	12
Championship: Central Michigan 20, Ohio 10
$ – Conference champion; x – Division champion/co-champions; y – Championship game participant; Rankings from AP Poll

The 2009 Akron Zips football team represented the University of Akron in the 2009 NCAA Division I FBS football season. Akron competed as a member of the Mid-American Conference (MAC) East Division. The team was coached by J. D. Brookhart and played their homes game at InfoCision Stadium.

== Before the season ==
Much of the anticipation leading up to the season involved the grand opening of the new on-campus Summa Field at InfoCision Stadium. The university set up webcams, allowing fans to watch the progress of the stadium being built. Fans watched online as the final stages of the stadium were pieced together, including a 40-foot by 25-foot video scoreboard and ribbon boards along the east stands.

The first Spring Training Scrimmage took place on March 12, after only five practices. With the offensive side down two key running backs (DeVoe Torrence and Alex Allen), the defense was able to win this session, along with the second scrimmage on March 28. In the annual Blue-Gold game, the defense came out victorious again, winning the game with a score of 28–24. Key plays in this game included a blocked field goal by Norman Shuford and an interception by Kevin Davis.

Alex Allen was one of the 106 nominees for Allstate's AFCA Good Works Team. According to the Press Release, this list "honors college football players who make outstanding contributions in the areas of volunteerism and civic involvement."

=== Recruiting ===
College recruiting (2009)
Name	Hometown	School	Height	Weight	40^{‡}	Commit date
Bill Alexander; CB	Columbus, GA	Carver HS	5 ft 8 in (1.73 m)	165 lb (75 kg)	4.49	Feb 4, 2009
Bill Alexander; CB	Recruit ratings: Scout: Rivals: (40)					
Broderick Alexander; RB	Covington, GA	Eastside HS	6 ft 2 in (1.88 m)	215 lb (98 kg)	–	Feb 4, 2009
Broderick Alexander; RB	Recruit ratings: Scout: Rivals: (40)					
David Anderson; LB	Cincinnati, OH	Purcell Marian HS	6 ft 3 in (1.91 m)	210 lb (95 kg)	–	Feb 4, 2009
David Anderson; LB	Recruit ratings: Scout: Rivals: (40)					
Deonte Ball; CB	Yuma, AZ	Arizona Western JC	6 ft 0 in (1.83 m)	190 lb (86 kg)	4.40	Dec 14, 2008
Deonte Ball; CB	Recruit ratings: Scout:					
Jake Brandt; OT	Bexley, OH	Bexley HS	6 ft 6 in (1.98 m)	230 lb (100 kg)	4.9	Feb 4, 2009
Jake Brandt; OT	Recruit ratings: Scout: Rivals: (74)					
Josh Couch; P	Carlisle, OH	Carlisle HS	6 ft 3 in (1.91 m)	220 lb (100 kg)	–	Feb 4, 2009
Josh Couch; P	Recruit ratings: Scout: Rivals: (40)					
Jake Delmonico	Beaver Falls, PA	Blackhawk HS	5 ft 11 in (1.80 m)	180 lb (82 kg)	4.42	Dec 10, 2008
Jake Delmonico	Recruit ratings: Scout: Rivals: (40)					
Jerrod Dillars; WR	Adrian, MI	Adrian HS	6 ft 4 in (1.93 m)	175 lb (79 kg)	–	Jan 19, 2009
Jerrod Dillars; WR	Recruit ratings: Scout: Rivals: (40)					
Blake Fraley; MLB	Hilliard, OH	Hillard Darby HS	6 ft 3 in (1.91 m)	205 lb (93 kg)	–	Oct 31, 2008
Blake Fraley; MLB	Recruit ratings: Scout: Rivals: (40)					
Dee Frieson; WR	Orange Park, FL	Fleming Island HS	5 ft 10 in (1.78 m)	170 lb (77 kg)	–	Jun 16, 2008
Dee Frieson; WR	Recruit ratings: Scout: Rivals: (40)					
Randy Greenwood; CB	Mentor, OH	Lake Catholic HS	5 ft 11 in (1.80 m)	180 lb (82 kg)	4.54	Aug 14, 2008
Randy Greenwood; CB	Recruit ratings: Scout: Rivals: (67)					
Chris Henderson; DT	New Berlin, NY	Milford Academy	6 ft 2.5 in (1.89 m)	313 lb (142 kg)	–	Feb 4, 2009
Chris Henderson; DT	Recruit ratings: Scout: Rivals: (77)					
Abdallah Homayed; SLB	Dearborn, MI	Fordson HS	6 ft 3 in (1.91 m)	230 lb (100 kg)	5.09	Jan 22, 2009
Abdallah Homayed; SLB	Recruit ratings: Scout: Rivals: (40)					
Jeremy LaFrance; WR	Fullerton, CA	Fullerton JC	6 ft 1 in (1.85 m)	200 lb (91 kg)	4.50	Feb 4, 2009
Jeremy LaFrance; WR	Recruit ratings: Scout: Rivals:					
Anthony Meriwether; WR	Middleburg Heights, OH	Midpark HS	6 ft 2 in (1.88 m)	185 lb (84 kg)	–	Dec 14, 2008
Anthony Meriwether; WR	Recruit ratings: Scout: Rivals: (40)					
Patrick Nicely; QB	Willoughby, OH	South HS	6 ft 5 in (1.96 m)	210 lb (95 kg)	4.70	Jan 21, 2009
Patrick Nicely; QB	Recruit ratings: Scout: Rivals: (71)					
Joe Petrides; OG	Baltimore, MD	Archbishop Curley HS	6 ft 5 in (1.96 m)	240 lb (110 kg)	–	Nov 17, 2008
Joe Petrides; OG	Recruit ratings: Scout: Rivals: (40)					
Nolan Procter; WR	Beverly Hills, MI	Wylie E. Groves HS	5 ft 9 in (1.75 m)	170 lb (77 kg)	–	Jul 23, 2008
Nolan Procter; WR	Recruit ratings: Scout: Rivals: (74)					
Jon Root; TE	Erie, PA	Cathedral Preparatory School	6 ft 5 in (1.96 m)	210 lb (95 kg)	–	Feb 1, 2009
Jon Root; TE	Recruit ratings: Scout: Rivals: (40)					
Adam Steiner; C	Canton, OH	GlenOak HS	6 ft 2 in (1.88 m)	215 lb (98 kg)	–	Feb 4, 2009
Adam Steiner; C	Recruit ratings: Scout: Rivals: (40)					
Phil Tonga; DT	Wilmington, CA	Los Angeles Harbor JC	6 ft 4 in (1.93 m)	280 lb (130 kg)	–	Feb 4, 2009
Phil Tonga; DT	Recruit ratings: Scout: Rivals:					
Joe Vidovic; OT	Willoughby, OH	South HS	6 ft 7 in (2.01 m)	250 lb (110 kg)	–	Dec 7, 2008
Joe Vidovic; OT	Recruit ratings: Scout: Rivals: (40)					
Diamond Weaver; CB	Santa Rosa, CA	Santa Rosa JC	5 ft 10 in (1.78 m)	185 lb (84 kg)	4.35	Dec 12, 2008
Diamond Weaver; CB	Recruit ratings: Scout: Rivals:					
Grant Williams; TE	Louisville, KY	Ballard HS	6 ft 4 in (1.93 m)	200 lb (91 kg)	–	Nov 19, 2008
Grant Williams; TE	Recruit ratings: Scout: Rivals: (40)					
Overall recruit ranking: Scout: 116 Rivals: 69
‡ Refers to 40-yard dash; Note: In many cases, Scout, Rivals, 247Sports, On3, and ESPN may conflict in their listings of height, weight and 40 time.; In these cases, the average was taken. ESPN grades are on a 100-point scale.; Sources: "Akron Commit List for 2009". Rivals.; "Scout.com: Football Recruiting". Scout.; "Akron Football Recruiting 2009". ESPN.; "Scout.com Team Recruiting Rankings". Scout.; "2009 Team Ranking". Rivals.com.

== Schedule ==
Date	Time	Opponent	Site	TV	Result	Attendance	Source
September 5	12:00 p.m.	at No. 9 Penn State*	Beaver Stadium; University Park, PA	BTN	L 7–31	104,968	
September 12	2:00 p.m.	Morgan State*	InfoCision Stadium–Summa Field; Akron, OH		W 41–0	27,881	
September 19	3:30 p.m.	Indiana*	InfoCision Stadium–Summa Field; Akron, OH	ESPNU	L 21–38	18,340	
September 26	4:00 p.m.	at Central Michigan	Kelly/Shorts Stadium; Mt. Pleasant, MI	Fox Sports Ohio	L 21–48	20,032	
October 10	6:00 p.m.	Ohio^{†}	InfoCision Stadium–Summa Field; Akron, OH		L 7–19	16,381	
October 17	3:30 p.m.	at Buffalo	University at Buffalo Stadium; Amherst, NY	Fox Sports Ohio	L 17–21	13,750	
October 24	3:30 p.m.	at Syracuse*	Carrier Dome; Syracuse, NY		L 14–28	36,991	
October 31	12:00 p.m.	at Northern Illinois	Huskie Stadium; DeKalb, IL	ESPN GamePlan	L 10–27	10,148	
November 7	3:30 p.m.	Kent State	InfoCision Stadium–Summa Field; Akron, OH (Wagon Wheel)	Fox Sports Ohio	W 28–20	20,802	
November 13	8:30 p.m.	Temple	InfoCision Stadium–Summa Field; Akron, OH	ESPNU	L 17–56	10,927	
November 20	5:30 p.m.	at Bowling Green	Doyt Perry Stadium; Bowling Green, OH	ESPNU	L 20–36	9,163	
November 27	2:00 p.m.	Eastern Michigan	InfoCision Stadium–Summa Field; Akron, OH	ESPNU, ESPN360	W 28–21	9,962	
*Non-conference game; ^{†}Homecoming; Rankings from AP Poll released prior to the game; All times are in Eastern time

== Roster ==
The Zips lost relatively few starters from the 2008 football season. However, the starters that they did lose include lettermen Dennis Kennedy and Chris Kemme, the latter of which signed for the Detroit Lions after the 2009 NFL draft. On the defensive side, Akron lost all three linebackers to graduation, and Strong Safety/Kickoff Returner Bryan Williams signed a free agency deal with the Cleveland Browns.

As of 2009-08-17

Wide receivers

- 1 Deryn Bowser – Senior
- 6 Curtis Brown – Sophomore
- 7 Dashan Miller – Senior
- 9 Gary Pride II – Sophomore
- 12 Jeremy Bruce – Senior
- 19 Nolan Procter – Freshman
- 21 Andre Jones – Senior
- 29 Randy Greenwood – Freshman
- 80 Nadir Brown – (redshirt) Freshman
- 81 Anthony Meriwether – Freshman
- 82 Jeremy Lafrance – Junior
- 83 Dee Frieson – Freshman
- 83 Shawn Roberts – Sophomore
- 86 Troy Eison – Junior
- 87 Richard Sandilands – Junior
- 88 Jerrod Dillars – Freshman

Offensive line

- 51 Elliott Bates – Senior
- 53 Dan Ronsman – Sophomore
- 63 Joe Pachuta – Freshman
- 64 Mitch Straight – (redshirt) Freshman
- 65 Adam Bice – (redshirt) Freshman
- 68 Andrew Colosimo – (redshirt) Freshman
- 69 Casey Estrada – Senior
- 70 Paul Simkovich – Sophomore
- 71 Mike Ward – Junior
- 72 Zac Kasparek – Sophomore
- 73 Jake Anderson – sophomore
- 75 Corey Woods – Junior
- 76 Joe Petrides – Freshman
- 77 Joe Vidovic – Freshman
- 78 Zack Anderson – Senior
- 79 Jason Sekinger – Junior

Tight ends

- 84 Rhyne Ladrach – (redshirt) Freshman
- 85 Kyle Weber – Junior
- 86 Jake Brandt – Freshman
- 94 Grant Williams – Freshman
- 95 Jon Root – Freshman
- 98 Nick Legger – Senior

Quarterbacks

- 2 Jared Wackerly – (redshirt) Freshman
- 5 Matt Rodgers – Sophomore
- 11 Chris Jacquemain – Senior
- 13 Jordan Miller – (redshirt) Freshman
- 16 Patrick Nicely – Freshman
- 19 Kevin Montgomery- (redshirt) Freshman

Running backs

- 3 Dale Martin – Sophomore
- 4 DeVoe Torrence – (redshirt) Freshman
- 10 Alex Allen – Senior
- 13 Samuel Bullock- " (redshirt) Junior"
- 14 Thomas Miller –

 Freshman

- 15 Nate Burney – Junior
- 17 Norman Shuford – (redshirt) Freshman
- 22 Broderick Alexander – Freshman
- 25 Nathan Cope – Sophomore
- 32 Joe Tuzze – Senior
- 42 LeVon Morefield – Junior

Defensive line

- 13 Shane Shead – Sophomore
- 44 Abdullah Homayed – Freshman
- 45 Joe Rash – Sophomore
- 52 Marquinn Davis – Sophomore
- 44 Antoine Jones – (redshirt) Junior
- 56 Almondo Sewell – Junior
- 60 Dan Marcoux – Sophomore
- 66 Chad Budy – Sophomore
- 90 Phil Tonga – Junior
- 91 Nick Bridenbaugh – Sophomore
- 92 Ryan Bain – Senior
- 93 Chris Henderson – Freshman
- 96 Hasan Hazime – Sophomore
- 97 James Harvey – Sophomore
- 99 Cowles Stewart – Sophomore

Linebackers

- 5 Troy Gilmer – (redshirt) Freshman
- 8 Shawn Lemon – Junior
- 18 Will Fleming – Freshman
- 20 Mike Thomas – Junior
- 23 Sean Fobbs – Junior
- 24 Aaron Williams – Sophomore
- 28 Amin Kabir – Senior
- 29 Da-Von Moore – Sophomore
- 30 David Anderson – Freshman
- 34 Brian Wagner – (redshirt) Freshman
- 42 Larry Dawson – (redshirt) Freshman
- 47 Al-Teric Balaam – Senior
- 49 Matt Little – Sophomore
- 50 Mike Polinski – Junior
- 54 Blake Fraley – Freshman
- 57 Nate Schuler – (redshirt) Freshman
- 58 Marcus Lemon – Senior
- 82 Viktor Rajek – Junior

Defensive backs

- 1 Diamond Weaver – Junior
- 2 Jalil Carter – Junior
- 6 Manley Waller – Sophomore
- 9 Doug Richardson – Junior
- 11 Miguel Graham – Senior
- 15 Marvase Byrd – (redshirt) Freshman
- 16 Jordan House – Freshman
- 25 Jake Delmonico – Freshman
- 26 Kevin Davis – (redshirt) Junior
- 27 Wayne Cobham – Senior
- 31 Emmanuel Lartey – Freshman
- 33 Josh Richmond – (redshirt) Freshman
- 35 Bryant McMillon – Senior
- 36 Jared Province – (redshirt) Freshman
- 45 Bill Alexander – Freshman
- 48 Tyler Campbell – Junior

Punters

- 8 Zack Campbell – Sophomore
- 38 John Stec – Senior
- 40 Josh Couch – Freshman

Kickers

- 37 Branko Rogovic – Junior
- 45 Igor Iveljic – Junior

Long Snapper

- 43 Adam Steiner – Freshman
† Starter at position * Injured; will not play in 2009.

== Coaching staff ==
The Zips made hired three new coaches for the 2009 football season. Shane Montgomery was the head coach of the Miami Redhawks for the past four seasons, and moved over to serve as Akron's offensive coordinator and tight ends coach. During his time at Miami, he led the team to a first-place tie in the MAC East Division in both 2005 and 2007. Walt Harris is best known for being the head coach of Pitt from 1997 to 2004 and Stanford in 2005 and 2006. A week later, Akron announced the hiring of new Linebackers coach Vince Okruch.

Name	Position	Year at school
J.D. Brookhart	Head coach	6th
Walt Harris	Asst. head coach Pass game coordinator Quarterbacks coach	1st
Jim Fleming	Defensive coordinator Safeties coach	6th
Shane Montgomery	Offensive coordinator Tight ends coach	1st
Brian Callahan	Run Game coordinator Offensive line coach	6th
Dana Chambers	Defensive line coach	4th
Reno Ferri	Recruiting coordinator Running backs coach	6th
Emmanuel McDaniel	Cornerbacks coach	3rd
Mauro Monz	Wide receivers coach	4th
Vince Okruch	Linebackers coach	1st

== Game summaries ==
=== Penn State ===
	1	2	3	4	Total
Zips	0	0	7	0	7
#8 Nittany Lions	14	17	0	0	31

Ninth-ranked Penn State built a 31–0 halftime lead, holding Akron to 28 total yards and minus-17 yards rushing in the first half. Akron was able to get on the board in the second half on a 40-yard touchdown pass from quarterback Chris Jacquemain following a Penn State turnover. The Zips finished with 186 total yards, only 28 of which were from rushing. Penn State amassed 515 total yards including 379 from passing, mostly from quarterback Daryll Clark, who also threw 3 touchdowns. Following the win, the Nittany Lions rose to #5 in the polls and improved to 4–0 all-time against the Zips.

=== Morgan State ===
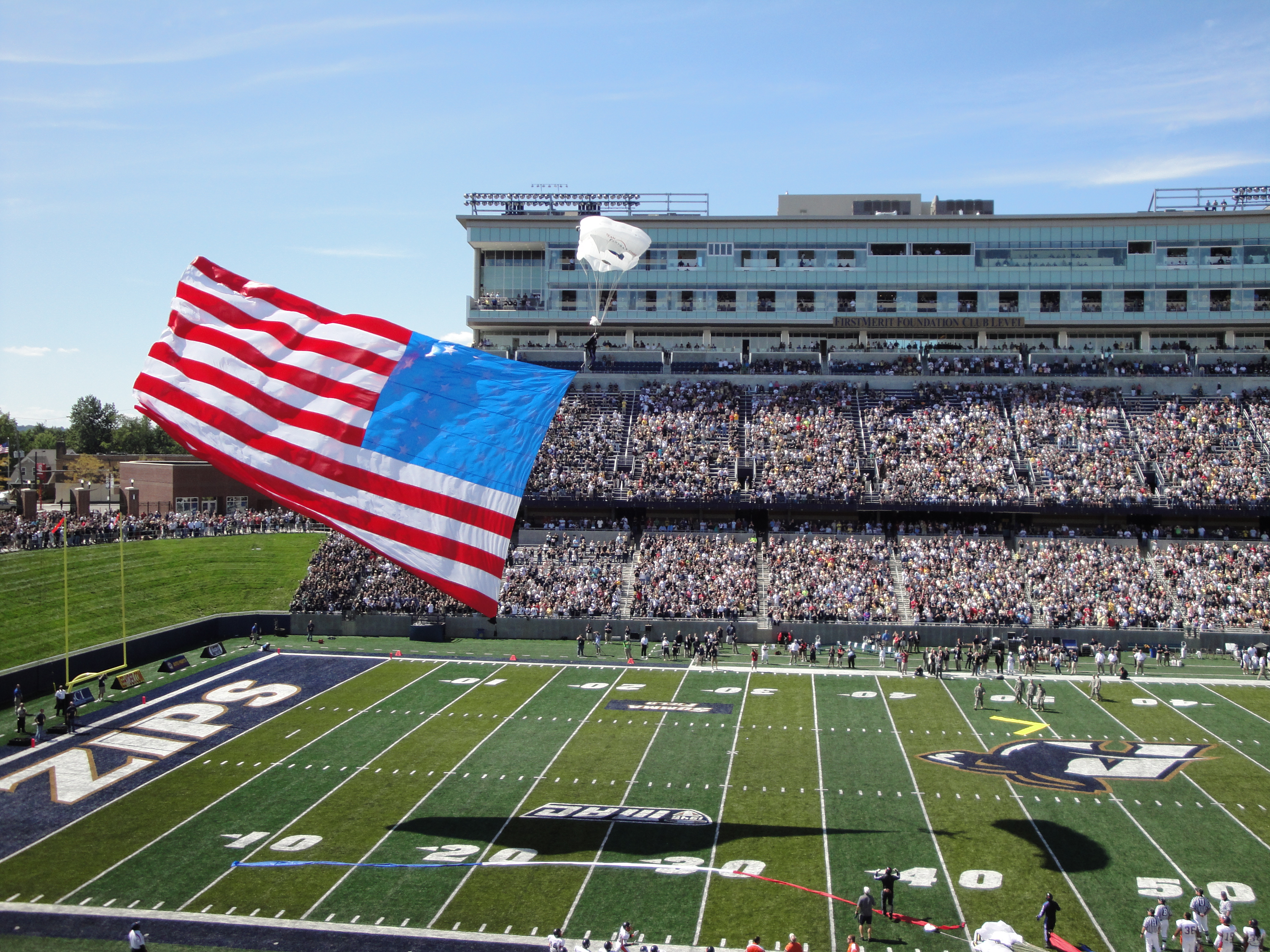
A parachuter descends with American flag in tow onto the surface of Summa Field as part of the opening day festivities.

	1	2	3	4	Total
Bears	0	0	0	0	0
Zips	7	17	10	7	41

The Zips opened Summa Field at InfoCision Stadium against the Morgan State Bears, a Football Championship Subdivision team. This was the Zips' first meeting with the Bears, as well as the Bears' season opener. The Bears were led by Carlton Jackson, who had previously played for the Zips in the 2007 season. He battled for the starting quarterback position with Chris Jacquemain in that year, who prevailed and led the Zips in this game.

Logistically, the game went on without any major problems and the new stadium was well received by fans. The biggest problem according to fans was finding their appropriate parking lot. During the game, Akron amassed 436 total offensive yards, which included 186 passing yards. This was the most passing yards allowed by Morgan State since a 2008 game against Towson. Despite the 250 yards rushing, no running back individually rushed for 100 yards, because six different backs were used.

=== Indiana ===
	1	2	3	4	Total
Hoosiers	10	7	7	14	38
Zips	7	7	0	7	21

The game marked the second meeting between the two teams, the first being in the 2007 season at Indiana's Memorial Stadium where the Hoosiers won 41–24. Indiana faced Akron in their third game of the season and first road game after defeating Eastern Kentucky and Western Michigan at home. This was also the first time a team from the Big Ten Conference had played in Akron. In the days leading up to the game, however, the Zips met with some adversity when it was announced September 18 that starting quarterback Chris Jacquemain would be indefinitely suspended for a violation of team rules. No reason was given in that suspension nor was a timetable provided for his return.

Behind Ben Chappell's two touchdown passes and Ray Fisher's opening kickoff return, the Hoosiers were able to again defeat the Zips by a final score of 38–21. For Akron, new starting quarterback Matt Rodgers, who had just two days of practice as the starting quarterback, completed six of his eight passes in the first half, but threw four interceptions in the second half. Two of the interceptions would lead to touchdowns for Indiana. The Zips were able to score touchdowns on a blocked punt early in the game as well as a Rodgers rushing touchdown.

=== Central Michigan ===
	1	2	3	4	Total
Zips	0	7	7	7	21
Chippewas	13	21	7	7	48

Akron began the MAC schedule with an away game against Central Michigan, their first meeting since a 35–32 Central Michigan victory at the Rubber Bowl in 2007. The Zips faced more discouraging news in the week leading up to the game. First, it was announced on September 23 that Jacquemain had been dismissed from the team. The next day, the university announced that sophomore Cowles Stewart had been suspended from the team after he was charged with felonious assault and running backs coach and recruiting coordinator Reno Ferri was put on paid administrative leave as the university began to investigate violations of NCAA Compliance rules.

Central Michigan Quarterback Dan LeFevour had a career day against the Zips, scoring six touchdowns in becoming the seventh MAC quarterback to pass for 10,000 yards in his career. Matt Rogers achieved a pass efficiency of 120 with no interceptions. He completed 12 of his 19 passes for a total of 127 yards. Running Back Joe Tuzze also ran in for a score, which was the first in his collegiate career. The Zips fell to 8–14 all-time against the Chippewas with the loss.

=== Ohio ===
	1	2	3	4	Total
Bobcats	3	0	7	9	19
Zips	0	0	7	0	7

After an off-week during the season, the Zips awaited their next MAC Opponent, Ohio University. Overall, the series between these two schools are tied, 12–12–1, with the last game a 49–42 loss in Athens. However, this series is heavily favored year after year towards the home team. The last game that was lost at the Rubber Bowl was in 1997 when the Zips lost in a four-point decision. Prior to the game, previously suspended running backs coach Reno Ferri had resigned from his position, effective November 1. This resignation comes amidst an internal investigation by the university regarding recruiting violations.

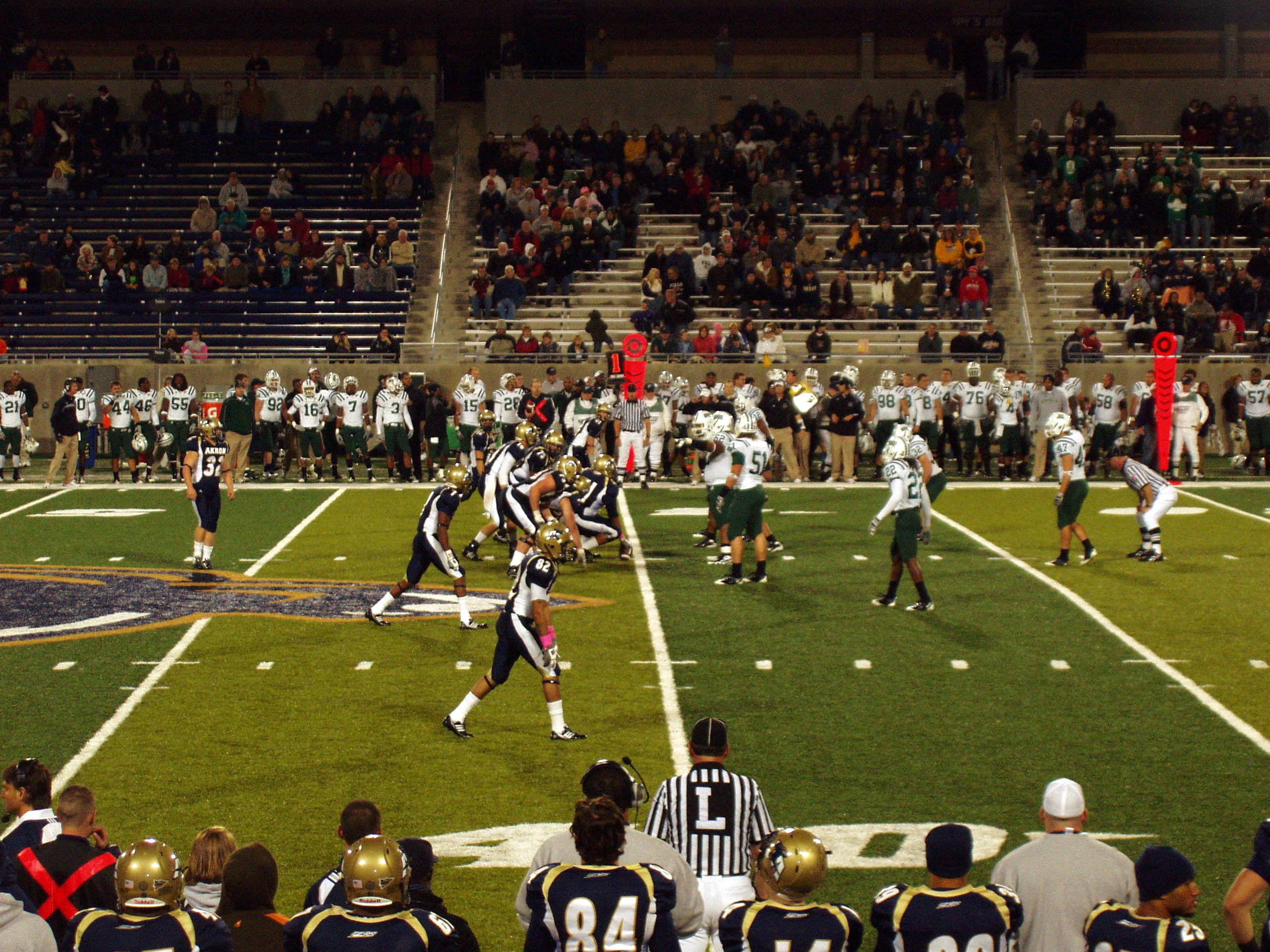
Akron Zips line up against the Ohio Bobcats in a football game at InfoCision Stadium.

The woes only got worse once the game started for Akron. During the second quarter, starting quarterback Matt Rodgers suffered an ACL injury and was removed for the rest of the game, possibly the rest of the season. To replace him, the Zips had to turn to their third quarterback, Patrick Nicely, who was originally planned to have a redshirt year. The lone touchdown for the Zips came in the third quarter when running back Joe Tuzze ran for a 3-yard score. Other than that, the game belonged to Ohio. The Bobcats' scoring came from two field goals and two touchdowns (one two-point conversion attempt failed).

=== Buffalo ===
	1	2	3	4	Total
Zips	0	7	0	10	17
Bulls	0	7	7	7	21

Akron began a three-game road series with a trip to UB Stadium to face the Buffalo Bulls. Akron leads the overall series 8–2, but Buffalo has won each of the past two meetings, including a 40–43 quadruple-overtime decision in the 2008 season. That was the last game in the historic Rubber Bowl, as the university was working hard on the new stadium. The Zips, 1–4 on the season, had been in this same position in 2005, when they won the most conference games in the school's history as well as the MAC Championship.

Akron began the scoring in the second quarter when Mike Ward recovered a Patrick Nicely fumble in the endzone. However, Buffalo quickly came back with 8:47 left in the first half and tied the game on a Maynard pass to make the game 7–7. Buffalo scored again only four minutes later with another pass to Roosevelt, and the game went to halftime with the score 14–7. After the break, Zips running back Alex Allen tied the game once again with a 1-yard touchdown run, and kicker Branko Rogovic gave Akron its final lead of 17–14 with 9:57 remaining in the game. However, Buffalo was able to make the last score as Mario Henry made a 1-yard touchdown run with 6 minutes remaining in the game. Akron was never able to recover.

This game was high in injuries as the Zips lost two significant players as a result of this game. Leading receiver and senior Deryn Bowser left the game in the first half with a broken fibula. Along with Bowser, Sophomore linebacker Aaron Williams suffered a broken arm in the 21–17 loss. Both players will not return this season. The Bulls also lost players due to injuries, with tailbacks Ike Nduka and Brandom Thermilus both going down with sprained ankle injuries. Junior tight end Kyle Brey also left with a shoulder injury.

=== Syracuse ===
	1	2	3	4	Total
Zips	7	0	7	0	14
Orange	0	14	7	7	28

In the middle of the season, the Zips took a break from Mid-American Conference opponents and traveled to Syracuse, New York, to take on the Syracuse Orange. The series between these two teams only began last season, as Akron traveled to the Carrier Dome and came out with a victory, 42–28. This victory was seen as an upset by many journalists, although the Orange finished the season 3–9 and finished last in the Big East Conference. Syracuse was poised for revenge against Akron.

Freshman quarterback Nicely got the first touchdown of his collegiate career when he connected with Andre Jones in the first quarter. After moving to the wide receiver position due to Bowser's injury, Andre Jones became the only player in the nation to start at four different positions, three on offense and one on defense. Early in the second quarter, Syracuse got its first score from running back Delone Carter on a 7-yard run with 12:20 remaining in the half. The Orange was able to score again with 4:14 remaining when Carter scored another touchdown. With the score 14–7 in Syracuse's favor, Akron's kicker Branko Rogovic missed a 29-yard field goal to send the game into halftime. The second-half kickoff was returned by Dashan Miller for 98 yards to tie the game, but Syracuse scored two more touchdowns, one by Marcus Sales and another by Carter, to win the game.

=== Northern Illinois ===
	1	2	3	4	Total
Zips	0	0	10	0	10
Huskies	3	3	0	21	27

With hopes of playing in a bowl game all but lost, the Zips traveled to Northern Illinois University to take on the MAC West Huskies. The Zips have faced the Huskies a total of nine times, including the 2005 MAC Championship Game on Ford Field. Northern Illinois leads the overall series 5–4, although Akron has won the last two meetings. The previous match up between these two teams was in the Championship Game. Northern Illinois was ahead 30–24 with only 17 seconds remaining in the game when Luke Getsy connected with Domenik Hixon for a 36-yard touchdown pass to give the Zips a 31–30 victory. Akron won both meetings in 2005 with a combined score of 79–62.

Along with the Zips, the Huskies have been having quarterback problems as well. In an earlier game against the Toledo Rockets, starting quarterback Chandler Harnish was sent off of the field with a knee injury. This forced the team to start their backup, DeMarcus Grady, for the Miami and Akron games. In the first half of the game, the only scoring was provided by Northern Illinois kicker Mike Salerno when he scored field goals in the first and second quarter. In the third quarter, however, the momentum shifted when Akron was able to make two scores to take the lead. Branko Rogovic provided the first points by kicking a 34-yard field goal in their first possession after kickoff, and then scored a touchdown on an 80-yard pass from halfback Alex Allen to Andre Jones to make the score 10–6.

Northern Illinois would prove to bounce back in the fourth quarter however, and put three touchdowns on the board to win the game. The first came only 1 minute and 25 seconds into the quarter, as running back Chad Spann rushed 28 yards for a touchdown. Spann would score again with eight minutes remaining to put the Huskies ahead 20–10, and the game ended on a Nathan Palmer touchdown with only 46 seconds remaining.

=== Kent State ===
	1	2	3	4	Total
Golden Flashes	3	10	0	7	20
Zips	7	7	7	7	28

Every year, The University of Akron and Kent State University face off in a rivalry game for the Wagon Wheel. While Akron has won 29 of the 51 matches against Kent State, the Golden Flashes held the lead since the Wheel was introduced in 1946. This year's game is unique in the series, in which both teams' quarterbacks are pure freshmen who just came out of high school not even six months ago. Kent State quarterback Spencer Keith took over the job as the original starter, Giorgio Morgan suffered an ankle injury in an earlier game.

Kent State was able to score on their first drive, moving 60 yards down the field to set up a field goal by Freddy Cortez. However, Akron immediately responded with a drive on their own, but ended up scoring a touchdown to take the lead 7–3 in the first quarter. The lead was extended in the second quarter by a 59-yard reception by Jeremy LaFrance, to set Akron's score at 14. The Golden Flashes were able to come back at this point, scoring ten unanswered points which were finished by a field goal in the ending seconds of the first half. In the third quarter, it had appeared that Jeremy Bruce had fumbled the ball, which was recovered by a Kent State defender and returned for a touchdown. After the review however, it was determined that Bruce's elbow had hit the ground before the ball coming loose, therefore the player was down. That play proved to be crucial to the Flashes, as they ended up losing the game by potentially one touchdown, with a final score of 28–20.

=== Temple ===
	1	2	3	4	Total
Owls	14	21	7	14	56
Zips	17	0	0	0	17

=== Bowling Green ===
	1	2	3	4	Total
Zips	3	7	3	7	20
Falcons	7	2	14	13	36

=== Eastern Michigan ===
	1	2	3	4	Total
Eagles	7	7	0	7	21
Zips	14	7	7	0	28

== Statistics ==
=== Team ===
	Akron	Opponents
Scoring	231	345
Points per game	19.2	28.8
First downs	199	237
Rushing	88	106
Passing	92	111
Penalty	19	20
Total offense	3611	4412
Avg per play	4.9	5.3
Avg per game	300.9	367.7
Fumbles-Lost	16–11	20–6
Penalties-Yards	70–610	67–600
Avg per game	50.8	50.0

	Akron	Opponents
Punts-Yards	60–2202	52–1847
Avg per punt	36.7	35.5
Time of possession/Game	27:13	32:47
3rd down conversions	48/150 (32%)	85/173 (49%)
4th down conversions	3/14 (21%)	6/15 (40%)
Touchdowns scored	30	46
Field goals-Attempts	7–17 (41%)	8–17 (47%)
PAT-Attempts	30–30 (100%)	43–45 (96%)
Attendance	104,293	195,052
Games/Avg per Game	6/17,382	6/32,509

==== Scores by quarter ====
	1	2	3	4	Total
Akron	62	59	65	45	231
Opponents	74	109	56	106	345

=== Offense ===
==== Rushing ====
Name	GP-GS	Att	Gain	Loss	Net	Avg	TD	Long	Avg/G
Joe Tuzze	9–4	55	251	7	244	4.4	2	17	27.1
Broderick Alexander	5–3	59	217	19	198	3.4	0	22	39.6
Alex Allen	12–2	59	216	28	188	3.2	5	22	15.7
Dale Martin	8–0	25	167	0	167	6.7	0	22	20.9
Matt Rodgers	5–3	40	226	70	156	3.9	3	28	31.2
DeVoe Torrence	7–3	30	160	14	146	4.9	0	31	20.9
Dashan Miller	12–10	8	110	2	108	13.5	1	29	9
Norman Shuford	8–2	28	69	12	57	2	0	10	7.1
Nate Burney	5–0	14	52	5	47	3.4	0	13	9.4
Patrick Nicely	8–7	42	149	103	46	1.1	0	29	5.8
Andre Jones	12–9	6	34	0	34	5.7	1	18	2.8
Jeremy Bruce	12–5	8	38	5	33	4.1	0	9	2.8
Chris Jacquemain	2–2	10	27	11	16	1.6	0	8	8
LeVon Morefield	5–0	2	8	0	8	4	0	7	1.6
Jared Wackerly	3–0	1	2	0	2	2	0	2	0.7
Mike Ward	12–12	0	0	0	0	0	1	0	0
Team	6–0	6	0	29	−29	−4.8	0	0	−4.8
Total		393	1726	305	1421	3.62	13	31	118.4

==== Passing ====
Name	GP-GS	Effic	Att-Cmp-Int	Pct	Yds	TD	Lng	Avg/G
Patrick Nicely	8–7	108.61	120–222–6	54.1	1349	6	59	168.6
Matt Rodgers	5–3	93.22	39–69–6	56.5	405	1	49	81.0
Chris Jacquemain	2–2	145.64	26–44–1	59.1	320	4	40	160.0
Jared Wackerly	3–0	140.48	4–5–0	80.0	36	0	16	12.0
Alex Allen	12–2	1102.00	1–1–0	100.0	80	1	80	6.7
Andre Jones	12–9	0.00	0–1–0	0.0	0	0	0	0.0
Total		113.32	190–342–13	55.6	2190	12	80	182.5

==== Receiving ====
Name	GP-GS	No.	Yds	Avg	TD	Long	Avg/G
Jeremy LaFrance	12–12	43	520	12.1	2	59	43.3
Andre Jones	12–9	33	553	16.8	4	80	46.1
Jeremy Bruce	12–5	29	219	7.6	1	20	18.2
Deryn Bowser	6–6	21	307	14.6	5	49	51.2
Dashan Miller	12–10	16	257	16.1	0	27	21.4
Dale Martin	8–0	8	37	4.6	0	12	4.6
Alex Allen	12–2	6	40	6.7	0	13	3.3
Anthony Meriwether	12–1	5	67	13.4	0	36	5.6
Nadir Brown	9–1	5	64	12.8	0	34	7.1
Nate Burney	5–0	5	40	8	0	12	8
Joe Tuzze	9–4	5	29	5.8	0	11	3.2
DeVoe Torrence	7–3	5	8	1.6	0	4	1.1
Kyle Weber	12–4	4	26	6.5	0	13	2.2
Norman Shuford	8–2	2	17	8.5	0	15	2.1
Broderick Alexander	5–3	2	3	1.5	0	2	0.6
Curtis Brown	5–0	1	3	3	0	3	0.6
Total		190	2190	11.5	12	80	182.5

=== Defense ===
Name	GP	Tackles				Sacks	Pass Defense		Interceptions				Fumbles		Blkd Kick
Name	GP	Solo	Ast	Total	TFL-Yds	No-Yds	BrUp	QBH	No.-Yds	Avg	TD	Long	Rcv-Yds	FF	Blkd Kick
Brian Wagner	12	72	60	132	7.0–18	1.0–4	3	2	2–33	16.5	1	32	2–0	2	—
Mike Thomas	12	39	32	71	2.5–6	—	6	—	2–0	0	0	0	1–0	—	—
Jalil Carter	12	35	23	58	3.0–14	0.5–3	3	—	1–11	11	0	11	—	1	1
Almondo Sewell	12	29	24	53	5.5–11	—	—	—	—	—	—	—	—	—	1
Miguel Graham	12	38	14	52	1.5–3	—	12	—	3–62	20.7	1	62	1–0	—	—
Hasan Hazime	12	29	20	49	8.0–24	3.0–15	2	1	—	—	—	—	—	1	1
Wayne Cobham	11	25	24	49	1.5–7	—	1	—	2–24	12	0	24	—	—	—
Manley Waller	11	34	13	47	1.5–2	—	6	—	3–50	16.7	0	37	—	1	—
Chad Budy	12	20	21	41	6.0–22	1.0–10	—	1	—	—	—	—	1–0	—	—
Aaron Williams	6	18	16	34	4.0–9	—	1	—	—	—	—	—	—	—	—
Tyler Campbell	11	21	10	31	0.5–0	—	1	—	—	—	—	—	—	1	—
Will Fleming	11	12	14	26	1.0–1	—	—	—	—	—	—	—	—	—	—
Shawn Lemon	11	14	10	24	6.5–25	3.0–15	—	—	—	—	—	—	—	1	—
James Harvey	11	10	13	23	4.0–8	—	—	—	—	—	—	—	—	—	—
Andre Jones	12	10	11	21	—	—	—	—	—	—	—	—	—	—	—
Marcus Lemon	11	10	9	19	—	—	—	—	—	—	—	—	—	2	—
Amin Kabir	10	12	6	18	—	—	—	1	—	—	—	—	—	—	—
Deni Odofin	12	5	10	15	6.0–22	1.5–11	—	—	—	—	—	—	—	—	—
Dan Marcoux	12	8	7	15	1.0–5	1.0–5	1	—	—	—	—	—	—	—	—
Kevin Davis	8	5	8	13	1.5–2	—	—	—	—	—	—	—	—	—	—
Marvase Byrd	12	9	4	13	—	—	1	—	—	—	—	—	—	—	—
Josh Richmond	12	6	3	9	1.0–1	—	—	—	—	—	—	—	—	—	—
Matt Little	10	6	3	9	2.0–4	—	1	—	—	—	—	—	—	—	—
Antoine Jones	11	1	5	6	—	—	—	—	—	—	—	—	—	—	—
Doug Richardson	10	1	5	6	—	—	—	—	—	—	—	—	—	—	—
Troy Gilmer	7	2	4	6	—	—	—	—	—	—	—	—	—	—	—
Jared Province	4	4	1	5	1.0–2	—	—	—	—	—	—	—	—	1	—
Joe Tuzze	9	—	4	4	—	—	—	—	—	—	—	—	—	—	—
Diamond Weaver	2	1	1	2	—	—	—	—	—	—	—	—	—	—	—
Joe Rash	3	1	1	2	—	—	—	—	—	—	—	—	—	—	—
Matt Rodgers	5	2	—	2	—	—	—	—	—	—	—	—	—	—	—
Jeremy Lafrance	12	2	—	2	—	—	—	—	—	—	—	—	—	—	—
DeVoe Torrence	7	1	—	1	—	—	—	—	—	—	—	—	—	—	—
Patrick Nicely	8	1	—	1	—	—	—	—	—	—	—	—	—	—	—
Branko Rogovic	12	1	—	1	—	—	—	—	—	—	—	—	—	—	—
Mike Ward	12	1	—	1	—	—	—	—	—	—	—	—	—	—	—
Al-Teric Balaam	1	—	1	1	—	—	—	—	—	—	—	—	—	—	—
Adam Bice	10	1	—	1	—	—	—	—	—	—	—	—	—	—	—
Corey Woods	12	1	—	1	—	—	—	—	—	—	—	—	—	—	—
Jake Anderson	12	1	—	1	—	—	—	—	—	—	—	—	—	—	—
Adam Steiner	12	—	—	—	—	—	—	—	—	—	—	—	1–0	—	—
Team	6	—	—	—	—	—	—	—	—	—	—	—	—	—	1
Total	12	488	377	865	65–186	11–63	38	5	13–180	13.8	2	62	6–0	10	4

=== Special teams ===
Name	Punting								Kickoffs				
Name	No.	Yds	Avg	Long	TB	FC	I20	Blkd	No.	Yds	Avg	TB	OB
John Stec	32	1168	36.5	49	3	10	4	0	—	—	—	—	—
Zack Campbell	27	1034	38.3	76	2	2	3	0	1	47	47	0	0
T.J. Marchese	—	—	—	—	—	—	—	—	1	38	38	0	0
Branko Rogovic	—	—	—	—	—	—	—	—	46	2658	57.8	3	2
Team	1	0	0	0	0	0	0	1	—	—	—	—	—
Total	60	2202	36.7	76	5	12	7	1	66	2743	57.1	3	2

Name	Punt returns					Kick returns				
Name	No.	Yds	Avg	TD	Long	No.	Yds	Avg	TD	Long
Jeremy Bruce	9	24	2.7	0	13	—	—	—	—	—
Jeremy Lafrance	4	22	5.5	0	11	3	86	28.7	0	38
Andre Jones	4	18	4.5	0	7	3	59	19.7	0	27
Diamond Weaver	1	20	20	0	20	—	—	—	—	—
Jalil Carter	1	38	38	0	0	13	246	18.9	0	42
Aaron Williams	0	0	0	1	0	—	—	—	—	—
Dashan Miller	—	—	—	—	—	31	798	25.7	1	98
Broderick Alexander	—	—	—	—	—	1	6	6	0	6
Joe Tuzze	—	—	—	—	—	1	4	4	0	4
Doug Richardson	—	—	—	—	—	1	−2	−2	0	0
Tyler Campbell	—	—	—	—	—	1	6	6	0	6
Jared Province	—	—	—	—	—	1	8	8	0	8
Total	19	122	6.4	1	20	55	1211	22.0	1	98
