= Trevor Cook =

English footballer

Personal information
- Full name: Trevor Cook
- Date of birth: 2 July 1956 (age 70)
- Place of birth: Blidworth, England
- Position: Forward

Senior career*
Years	Team	Apps	(Gls)
1973–1974	Mansfield Town	1	(0)
Total		1	(0)
- * Club domestic league appearances and goals

Trevor Cook (born 2 July 1956) is an English former professional footballer who played in the Football League for Mansfield Town.
