= Mike Zupancic =

American football player (born 1989)

No. 53
- Position: Long snapper

Personal information
- Born: December 14, 1989 (age 36); Trabuco Canyon, California, U.S.
- Listed height: 6 ft 5 in (1.96 m)
- Listed weight: 260 lb (118 kg)

Career information
- College: Eastern Michigan
- NFL draft: 2013: undrafted

Career history
- New England Patriots (2013)*
- * Offseason or practice squad member only

Michael Martin Zupancic (born December 14, 1989) is a former American football long snapper. He played college football at Eastern Michigan.

== Professional career ==
On May 3, 2013, he signed with the New England Patriots as undrafted free agent. On August 2, 2013, Zupancic was released by the New England Patriots. On August 5, 2013, Zupancic was re-signed by the Patriots. On August 26, 2013, he was cut by the Patriots.
