= Kito Poblah =

Canadian football player (born 1987)

No. 1
- Position: Wide receiver

Personal information
- Born: September 18, 1987 (age 39); Montreal, Quebec, Canada
- Listed height: 6 ft 2 in (1.88 m)
- Listed weight: 213 lb (97 kg)

Career information
- College: Central Michigan
- CFL draft: 2011: Supplemental 1st round

Career history
- 2011–2013: Winnipeg Blue Bombers
- 2014: BC Lions
- Stats at CFL.ca (archive)

Kito Poblah (born September 18, 1987) is a former Canadian football wide receiver. He played professionally for the Winnipeg Blue Bombers and BC Lions of the Canadian Football League (CFL). He played college football with the Central Michigan Chippewas.

== Professional career ==
=== Winnipeg Blue Bombers ===
Poblah didn't qualify for non-import status until after the 2011 CFL draft, and, as such, was only eligible to be taken in the 2011 supplemental draft. He was drafted by the Winnipeg Blue Bombers with the team forfeiting a first-round 2012 CFL draft pick to do so and signed a contract with the team on June 4, 2011. Poblah spent three seasons as a member of the Blue Bombers. In three seasons in Winnipeg he totaled 53 receptions for 534 yards with one touchdown. His best season was the 2012 CFL season in which he had 41 receptions for 417 yards and his lone touchdown. Poblah's missed significant playing time due to injuries in both the 2011 and 2013 CFL season's.

=== BC Lions ===
On January 31, 2014, Poblah was traded to the BC Lions in exchange for import defensive back Korey Banks. He played for one season for the Lions, registering 15 catches for 182 yards and one touchdown. He was released on May 25, 2015.
