= Ball State Cardinals football statistical leaders =

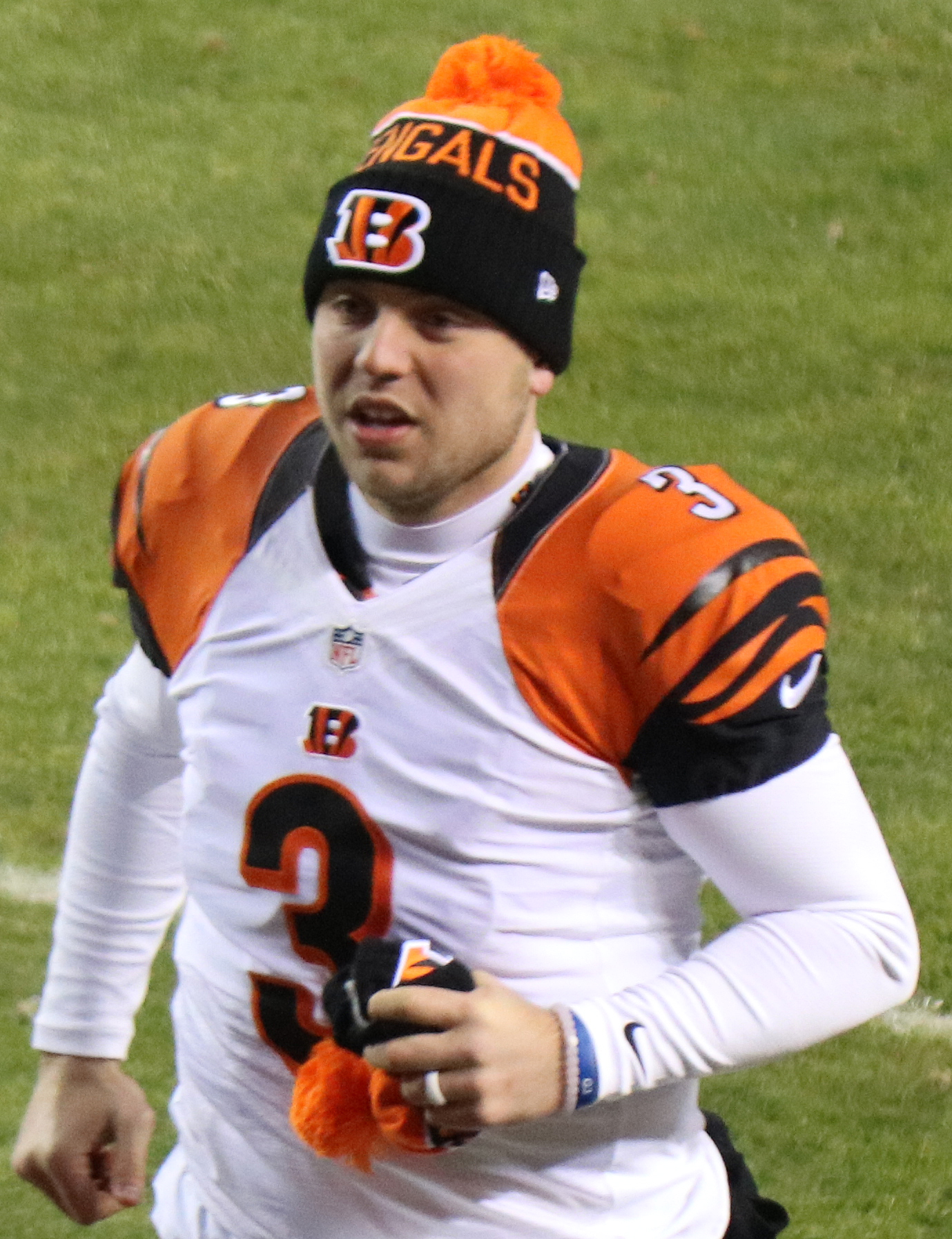
Keith Wenning is Ball State's career leader in passing yardage.

The Ball State Cardinals football statistical leaders are individual statistical leaders of the Ball State Cardinals football program in various categories, including passing, rushing, receiving, total offense, defensive stats, and kicking. Within those areas, the lists identify single-game, single-season, and career leaders. The Cardinals represent Ball State University in the NCAA's Mid-American Conference.

Although Ball State began competing in intercollegiate football in 1924, the school's official record book considers the "modern era" to have begun in 1960s. Records from before this year are often incomplete and inconsistent, and they are generally not included in these lists.

These lists are dominated by more recent players for several reasons:

- Since 1960s, seasons have increased from 10 games to 11 and then 12 games in length.
- The NCAA didn't allow freshmen to play varsity football until 1972 (with the exception of the World War II years), allowing players to have four-year careers.
- Bowl games only began counting toward single-season and career statistics in 2002. The Cardinals have played in four bowl games since this decision, giving many recent players an extra game to accumulate statistics.

These lists are updated through the end of the 2025 season.

== Passing ==
=== Passing yards ===
Career
Rk	Player	Yards	Years
1	Keith Wenning	11,402	2010 2011 2012 2013
2	Nate Davis	9,233	2006 2007 2008
3	Drew Plitt	9,051	2017 2018 2019 2020 2021
4	Riley Neal	7,393	2015 2016 2017 2018
5	Mike Neu	6,271	1990 1991 1992 1993
6	Talmadge Hill	5,902	2000 2001 2002 2003
7	David Riley	4,730	1986 1987 1988 1989
8	Wade Kosakowski	4,550	1985 1986 1987
9	Joey Lynch	4,292	2003 2004 2005 2006
10	Brent Baldwin	4,256	1993 1994 1995 1996

Single season
Rk	Player	Yards	Year
1	Keith Wenning	4,148	2013
2	Nate Davis	3,667	2007
3	Nate Davis	3,591	2008
4	Keith Wenning	3,095	2012
5	Drew Plitt	2,918	2019
6	Kadin Semonza	2,904	2024
7	Keith Wenning	2,786	2011
8	John Paddock	2,719	2022
9	Riley Neal	2,541	2016
	Drew Plitt	2,541	2021

Single game
Rk	Player	Yards	Year	Opponent
1	Mike Neu	469	1993	Toledo
2	Keith Wenning	445	2012	Kent State
	Keith Wenning	445	2013	Miami (Ohio)
4	Drew Plitt	439	2019	Fordham
5	Neil Britt	437	1983	Bowling Green
6	Keith Wenning	434	2012	Northern Illinois
7	Nate Davis	422	2007	Nebraska
8	John Paddock	403	2022	Northern Illinois
9	Riley Neal	402	2018	Kent State
10	Joey Lynch	397	2004	Central Michigan

=== Passing touchdowns ===
Career
Rk	Player	TDs	Years
1	Keith Wenning	92	2010 2011 2012 2013
2	Nate Davis	74	2006 2007 2008
3	Drew Plitt	68	2017 2018 2019 2020 2021
4	Talmadge Hill	44	2000 2001 2002 2003
5	Mike Neu	43	1990 1991 1992 1993
6	Joey Lynch	37	2003 2004 2005 2006
7	Dave Wilson	36	1976 1977 1978 1979
8	Brent Baldwin	35	1993 1994 1995 1996
	Riley Neal	35	2015 2016 2017
10	Kadin Semonza	28	2023 2024

Single season
Rk	Player	TDs	Year
1	Keith Wenning	35	2013
2	Nate Davis	30	2007
3	Nate Davis	26	2008
4	Kadin Semonza	25	2024
5	Keith Wenning	24	2012
	Drew Plitt	24	2019
7	Keith Wenning	19	2011
8	Joey Lynch	18	2005
	Nate Davis	18	2006
	Drew Plitt	18	2021
	John Paddock	18	2022

Single game
Rk	Player	TDs	Year	Opponent
1	Keith Wenning	6	2013	Miami (Ohio)
	Drew Plitt	6	2019	Fordham
3	Rick Scott	5	1974	Richmond
	Mike Neu	5	1990	Indiana State
	Andy Roesch	5	2002	Central Michigan
	Andy Roesch	5	2002	Eastern Michigan
	Keith Wenning	5	2012	Kent State
	Keith Wenning	5	2013	Akron

== Rushing ==
=== Rushing yards ===
Career
Rk	Player	Yards	Years
1	Jahwan Edwards	4,558	2011 2012 2013 2014
2	Marcus Merriweather	4,002	1999 2000 2001 2002
3	MiQuale Lewis	3,748	2006 2007 2008 2009 2010
4	Bernie Parmalee	3,483	1987 1988 1989 1990
5	LeAndre Moore	3,080	1995 1996 1997 1998
6	Michael Blair	3,051	1993 1994 1995 1996
7	Caleb Huntley	2,902	2017 2018 2019 2020
8	James Gilbert	2,806	2015 2016 2017 2018
9	Corey Croom	2,725	1989 1990 1991 1992
10	Carson Steele	2,447	2021 2022

Single season
Rk	Player	Yards	Year
1	MiQuale Lewis	1,736	2008
2	Marcus Merriweather	1,618	2002
3	Carson Steele	1,556	2022
4	Jahwan Edwards	1,410	2012
5	James Gilbert	1,332	2016
6	Caleb Huntley	1,275	2019
7	Jahwan Edwards	1,252	2014
8	Marcus Merriweather	1,244	2001
9	Tony Nibbs	1,210	1994
10	Corey Croom	1,157	1992

Single game
Rk	Player	Yards	Year	Opponent
1	MiQuale Lewis	301	2009	Eastern Michigan
2	James Gilbert	264	2016	Buffalo
3	Earl Taylor	260	1976	Eastern Michigan
4	Marcus Merriweather	257	2000	Central Michigan
5	Corey Croom	242	1992	Miami (Ohio)
6	Amos Van Pelt	228	1966	St. Joseph's
7	Marcus Merriweather	227	2002	Buffalo
8	Marcus Merriweather	217	2002	Western Michigan
9	Bernie Parmalee	211	1987	Ohio
10	Bernie Parmalee	208	1987	Indiana State

=== Rushing touchdowns ===
Career
Rk	Player	TDs	Years
1	Jahwan Edwards	51	2011 2012 2013 2014
2	Marcus Merriweather	34	1999 2000 2001 2002
3	Michael Blair	31	1993 1994 1995 1996
	MiQuale Lewis	31	2006 2007 2008 2009 2010
5	Mark Bornholdt	30	1978 1979 1980 1981
	James Gilbert	30	2015 2016 2017 2018
7	Bernie Parmalee	26	1987 1988 1989 1990
8	Amos Van Pelt	23	1966 1967 1968
9	Fred Kehoe	22	1947 1948 1949
10	Art Yaroch	21	1973 1974 1975 1976
	Caleb Huntley	21	2017 2018 2019 2020

Single season
Rk	Player	TDs	Year
1	MiQuale Lewis	22	2008
2	Mark Bornholdt	19	1979
3	Jahwan Edwards	14	2012
	Jahwan Edwards	14	2013
	Carson Steele	14	2022
6	Bernie Parmalee	13	1987
7	Marcus Merriweather	12	2001
	Marcus Merriweather	12	2002
	Jahwan Edwards	12	2014
	James Gilbert	12	2016
	Caleb Huntley	12	2019

Single game
Rk	Player	TDs	Year	Opponent
1	Michael Blair	4	1994	Akron
	MiQuale Lewis	4	2008	Indiana

== Receiving ==
=== Receptions ===
Career
Rk	Player	Rec	Years
1	Justin Hall	318	2017 2018 2019 2020 2021
2	KeVonn Mabon	244	2012 2013 2014 2015 2016
3	Dante Ridgeway	238	2002 2003 2004
4	Willie Snead	223	2011 2012 2013
5	Briggs Orsbon	213	2008 2009 2010 2011
6	Jordan Williams	200	2012 2013 2014 2015
7	Dante Love	199	2005 2006 2007 2008
8	Yo'Heinz Tyler	181	2018 2019 2020 2021 2022
9	Jamill Smith	177	2010 2011 2012 2013
10	Tanner Koziol	163	2022 2023 2024

Single season
Rk	Player	Rec	Year
1	Willie Snead	106	2013
2	Dante Ridgeway	105	2004
3	Dante Love	100	2007
4	Tanner Koziol	94	2024
5	Dante Ridgeway	89	2003
	Willie Snead	89	2012
7	KeVonn Mabon	85	2016
8	Justin Hall	78	2017
9	Jayshon Jackson	73	2022
10	Jordan Williams	72	2013
	Jordan Williams	72	2015

Single game
Rk	Player	Rec	Year	Opponent
1	Kevin Canfield	15	1972	Western Michigan
2	Dante Ridgeway	14	2004	Akron
	Dante Love	14	2007	Indiana
	Jamill Smith	14	2012	Northern Illinois
	Willie Snead	14	2012	Kent State
6	Adrian Reese	13	1999	Eastern Michigan
	Dante Ridgeway	13	2004	Eastern Michigan
	Justin Hall	13	2017	Western Michigan
	Dante Love	13	2007	Rutgers
	Briggs Orsbon	13	2008	Buffalo

=== Receiving yards ===
Career
Rk	Player	Yards	Years
1	Justin Hall	3,385	2017 2018 2019 2020 2021
2	Dante Ridgeway	3,030	2002 2003 2004
3	Willie Snead	2,991	2011 2012 2013
4	KeVonn Mabon	2,862	2012 2013 2014 2015 2016
5	Dante Love	2,778	2005 2006 2007 2008
6	Jordan Williams	2,723	2012 2013 2014 2015
7	Darius Hill	2,473	2005 2006 2007 2008
8	Yo'Heinz Tyler	2,265	2018 2019 2020 2021 2022
9	Deon Chester	2,256	1984 1985 1986 1987
10	Briggs Orsbon	2,218	2008 2009 2010 2011

Single season
Rk	Player	Yards	Year
1	Willie Snead	1,516	2013
2	Dante Ridgeway	1,399	2004
3	Dante Love	1,398	2007
4	Willie Snead	1,148	2012
5	Dante Ridgeway	1,075	2003
6	Dave Naumcheff	1,065	1983
7	Jordan Williams	1,050	2013
8	Brian Oliver	1,010	1993
9	KeVonn Mabon	976	2016
10	Darius Hill	926	2007

Single game
Rk	Player	Yards	Year	Opponent
1	Brian Oliver	297	1993	Toledo
2	Dave Naumcheff	237	1983	Bowling Green
3	Vic Comparetto	219	1971	Indiana State
4	Dante Ridgeway	217	2004	Western Michigan
5	Willie Snead	216	2012	Kent State
6	Dante Ridgeway	215	2004	Central Michigan
7	Dante Love	214	2007	Nebraska
8	Juan Gorman	200	1994	Purdue
9	Kevin Canfield	198	1972	Western Michigan
10	Dante Ridgeway	185	2004	Eastern Michigan

=== Receiving touchdowns ===
Career
Rk	Player	TDs	Years
1	Darius Hill	31	2005 2006 2007 2008
2	Willie Snead	26	2011 2012 2013
3	Brian Oliver	24	1991 1992 1993 1994
	Jordan Williams	24	2012 2013 2014 2015
5	Dante Ridgeway	22	2002 2003 2004
	Yo'Heinz Tyler	22	2018 2019 2020 2021 2022
7	Dante Love	20	2005 2006 2007 2008
8	Justin Hall	18	2017 2018 2019 2020 2021
	Tanner Koziol	18	2022 2023 2024
10	Jamill Smith	17	2010 2011 2012 2013

Single season
Rk	Player	TDs	Year
1	Willie Snead	15	2013
2	Darius Hill	11	2007
3	Brian Oliver	10	1993
	Dante Ridgeway	10	2003
	Darius Hill	10	2006
	Dante Love	10	2007
	Jordan Williams	10	2013
8	Willie Snead	9	2012

Single game
Rk	Player	TDs	Year	Opponent
1	Larry Hamell	4	1963	Valparaiso
	Rick Morrison	4	1977	Eastern Michigan
3	Vic Comparetto	3	1971	Indiana State
	Juan Gorman	3	1994	Purdue
	Dante Ridgeway	3	2004	Western Michigan
	Jack Tomlinson	3	2010	Akron
	Jamill Smith	3	2013	Miami (Ohio)

== Total offense ==
Total offense is the sum of passing and rushing statistics. It does not include receiving or returns.

=== Total offense yards ===
Career
Rk	Player	Yards	Years
1	Keith Wenning	11,730	2010 2011 2012 2013
2	Nate Davis	9,732	2006 2007 2008
3	Drew Plitt	9,474	2017 2018 2019 2020 2021
4	Riley Neal	8,756	2015 2016 2017 2018
5	Talmadge Hill	6,484	2000 2001 2002 2003
6	Mike Neu	5,852	1990 1991 1992 1993
7	David Riley	5,093	1986 1987 1988 1989
8	Brent Baldwin	4,643	1993 1994 1995 1996
9	Jahwan Edwards	4,558	2011 2012 2013 2014
10	Willard Rice	4,403	1968 1969 1970 1971

Single season
Rk	Player	Yards	Year
1	Keith Wenning	4,192	2013
2	Nate Davis	3,903	2008
3	Nate Davis	3,902	2007
4	Keith Wenning	3,200	2012
5	Drew Plitt	3,089	2019
6	Riley Neal	3,081	2016
7	Keith Wenning	2,968	2011
8	Kadin Semonza	2,819	2024
9	Riley Neal	2,675	2015
10	Drew Plitt	2,672	2021

Single game
Rk	Player	Yards	Year	Opponent
1	Nate Davis	479	2007	Nebraska
2	Riley Neal	463	2018	Kent State
3	Keith Wenning	459	2012	Kent State
4	Drew Plitt	453	2019	Fordham
5	Mike Neu	450	1993	Toledo
6	Keith Wenning	445	2013	Miami (Ohio)
7	Keith Wenning	438	2012	Northern Illinois
	Riley Neal	438	2016	Eastern Michigan
9	Riley Neal	411	2015	Northern Illinois
10	John Paddock	403	2022	Northern Illinois

=== Touchdowns responsible for ===
"Touchdowns responsible for" is the NCAA's official term for combined passing and rushing touchdowns.

Career
Rk	Player	TDs	Years
1	Keith Wenning	105	2010 2011 2012 2013
2	Nate Davis	84	2006 2007 2008
3	Drew Plitt	82	2017 2018 2019 2020 2021
4	Riley Neal	61	2015 2016 2017 2018
5	Jahwan Edwards	51	2011 2012 2013 2014
6	Dave Wilson	48	1976 1977 1978 1979
	Talmadge Hill	48	2000 2001 2002 2003
8	Mike Neu	45	1990 1991 1992 1993
9	Brent Baldwin	42	1993 1994 1995 1996
10	Joey Lynch	38	2003 2004 2005 2006

Single season
Rk	Player	TDs	Year
1	Keith Wenning	40	2013
2	Nate Davis	35	2007
3	Nate Davis	31	2008
4	Drew Plitt	29	2019
5	Keith Wenning	27	2012
6	Dave Wilson	26	1977
	Kadin Semonza	26	2024
8	MiQuale Lewis	22	2008
	Keith Wenning	22	2011
10	Riley Neal	21	2016
	Drew Plitt	21	2020

== Defense ==
=== Interceptions ===
Career
Rk	Player	Ints	Years
1	Sean Baker	18	2008 2009 2010 2011
2	Shafer Suggs	14	1972 1973 1974 1975
	Mike Lecklider	14	1974 1975 1976
4	Terry Schmidt	13	1971 1972 1973
	Greg Garnica	13	1986 1987 1988 1989

Single season
Rk	Player	Ints	Year
1	Craig Newberg	13	1981
	Kelly George	13	1982
3	Bryant Branigan	11	1992
	Keith McKenzie	11	1995
5	Wilber McDonald	10	1997

Single game
Rk	Player	Ints	Year	Opponent
1	Bob Burkhardt	3	1966	Indiana (Pa.)
	Doc Heath	3	1966	Valparaiso
	Mike Lecklider	3	1975	Richmond
	Greg Garnica	3	1989	Miami (Ohio)
	Sean Baker	3	2008	Akron

=== Tackles ===
Career
Rk	Player	Tackles	Years
1	Greg Garnica	689	1986 1987 1988 1989

Single season
Rk	Player	Tackles	Year
1	Kevin Johnson	204	1993
2	Kevin Johnson	196	1994
3	Greg Garnica	188	1987
4	Greg Garnica	185	1986
5	Mark Parris	178	1992
6	Brad Saar	169	1985
7	Mark Parris	167	1991
8	Greg Garnica	161	1989

Single game
Rk	Player	Tackles	Year	Opponent
1	Kevin Johnson	29	1993	Ohio
	Kevin Johnson	29	1993	Akron
	Kevin Johnson	29	1994	Eastern Michigan
4	Greg Garnica	25	1986	Eastern Michigan
	Kevin Johnson	25	1994	Miami (Ohio)

=== Sacks ===
Career
Rk	Player	Sacks	Years
1	Keith McKenzie	25.0	1992 1993 1994 1995
	Anthony Winbush	25.0	2014 2015 2016 2017
2	Kelly George	24.0	1979 1980 1981 1982

Single season
Rk	Player	Sacks	Year
1	Nathan Voorhis	12.0	2025
2	Anthony Winbush	11.5	2017
3	Anthony Winbush	8.5	2016
4	Nickey Baker	8.0	1965
	Shafer Suggs	8.0	1974
	Sidney Houston Jr.	8.0	2023

Single game
Rk	Player	Sacks	Year	Opponent
1	Toby Beegle	5.0	1990	Central Michigan

== Kicking ==
=== Field goals made ===
Career
Rk	Player	FGs	Years
1	John Diettrich	63	1983 1984 1985 1986
2	Kenny Stucker	62	1988 1989 1990 1991
3	Ian McGarvey	55	2007 2008 2009 2010
4	Brian Jackson	49	2003 2004 2005 2006
5	Scott Secor	44	2011 2012 2013 2014
6	Steven Schott	41	2009 2010 2011 2012
7	Morgan Hagee	40	2015 2016 2017
8	Brent Lockliear	38	1994 1995 1996 1997
9	Jackson Courville	26	2023 2024
10	Mike Langford	21	2000 2001 2002 2003

Single season
Rk	Player	FGs	Year
1	John Diettrich	25	1985
	Steven Schott	25	2012
	Scott Secor	25	2014
4	Kenny Stucker	19	1989
	Scott Secor	19	2013
6	Kenny Stucker	18	1988
	Ian McGarvey	18	2009
8	John Diettrich	17	1986
	Brian Jackson	17	2006
	Ben VonGunten	17	2022

Single game
Rk	Player	FGs	Year	Opponent
1	John Diettrich	5	1985	Indiana State
	Scott Secor	5	2014	Akron
