= List of Ball State Cardinals in the NFL draft =

This is a list of Ball State Cardinals football players in the NFL draft.

== Key ==
B	Back	K	Kicker	NT	Nose tackle
C	Center	LB	Linebacker	FB	Fullback
DB	Defensive back	P	Punter	HB	Halfback
DE	Defensive end	QB	Quarterback	WR	Wide receiver
DT	Defensive tackle	RB	Running back	G	Guard
E	End	T	Offensive tackle	TE	Tight end

== Selections ==
Year	Round	Pick	Player	Team	Position	Notes
1950	16	208	Art King	Cleveland Browns	G	
1955	25	295	Ralph Cook	Los Angeles Rams	T	
1959	27	313	Timmy Brown	Green Bay Packers	RB	3× Pro Bowl (1962, 1963, 1965), All-Pro (1965)
1965	19	257	Merv Rettenmund	Dallas Cowboys	RB	
1966	9	129	Jim Todd	Philadelphia Eagles	RB	
1968	7	182	Oscar Lubke	New York Jets	T	
1968	16	411	Elie Ghattas	New Orleans Saints	G	
1969	6	149	Amos Van Pelt	St. Louis Cardinals	RB	
1971	13	314	Don Burchfield	New Orleans Saints	TE	
1974	5	121	Terry Schmidt	New Orleans Saints	DB	All-Rookie Team (1974)
1975	16	391	Jim Mickles	New York Giants	TE	
1976	2	33	Shafer Suggs	New York Jets	DB	
1976	9	256	Art Stringer	Houston Oilers	LB	
1978	4	86	Maurice Harvey	Oakland Raiders	DB	
1979	7	167	Ken Kremer	Kansas City Chiefs	DE	
1980	10	255	Rush Brown	St. Louis Cardinals	DT	All-Rookie Team (1980)
1981	12	312	Mark O'Connell	Cincinnati Bengals	QB	
1993	8	214	Blaine Bishop	Houston Oilers	DB	4× Pro Bowl (1995, 1996, 1997, 2000); All-Pro (2000)
1996	7	252	Keith McKenzie	Green Bay Packers	LB	Super Bowl XXXI Champion
1997	3	95	Brad Maynard	New York Giants	P	All-Pro (2004)
1997	4	124	Cory Gilliard	Denver Broncos	DB	
2005	6	192	Dante Ridgeway	St. Louis Rams	WR	
2005	6	208	Justin Beriault	Dallas Cowboys	DB	
2005	6	210	Reggie Hodges	St. Louis Rams	P	
2009	3	75	Robert Brewster	Dallas Cowboys	T	
2009	5	171	Nate Davis	San Francisco 49ers	QB	
2014	5	166	Jonathan Newsome	Indianapolis Colts	DE	
2014	6	194	Keith Wenning	Baltimore Ravens	QB	
2020	5	149	Danny Pinter	Indianapolis Colts	T	
2023	7	250	Nic Jones	Kansas City Chiefs	DB	Super Bowl LVIII Champion

== Notable undrafted players ==
Note: No drafts held before 1920

Debut year	Player name	Position	Debut NFL/AFL team	Notes
1964	John Walker	CB	Dallas Cowboys	—
1986	Brad Saar	FB	Indianapolis Colts	—
1992	Bernie Parmalee	RB	Miami Dolphins	—
1993	Corey Croom	RB	New England Patriots	—
1997	Michael Blair	RB	Kansas City Chiefs	—
2009	Darius Hill	WR	Cincinnati Bengals	—
2012	Sean Baker	S	Tampa Bay Buccaneers	—
2014	Willie Snead	WR	Cleveland Browns	—
2015	Jahwan Edwards	RB	San Diego Chargers	—
2018	Anthony Winbush	DE	Atlanta Falcons	—
2022	Justin Hill	WR	Las Vegas Raiders	—
2022	Drew Plitt	QB	Cincinnati Bengals	—
