= 2009 Ball State Cardinals football team =

American college football season

2009 Ball State Cardinals football
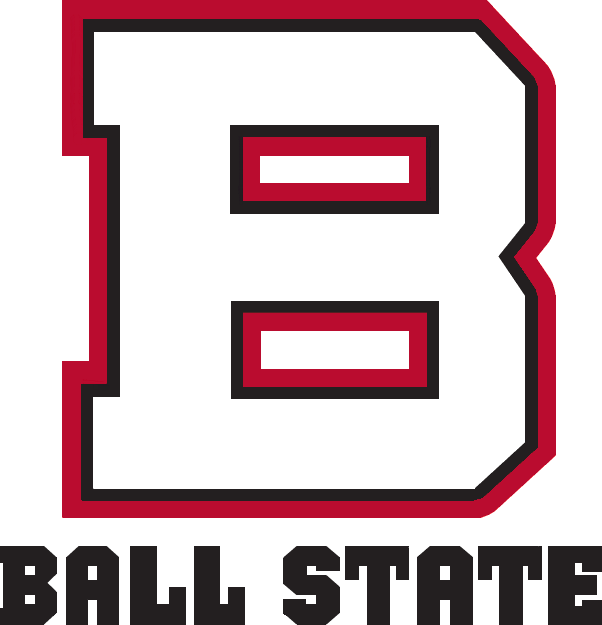
- Conference: Mid-American Conference
- West
- Record: 2–10 (2–6 MAC)
- Head coach: Stan Parrish (1st full season)
- Offensive coordinator: Eddie Faulkner (1st season)
- Defensive coordinator: Doug Graber (1st season)
- Home stadium: Scheumann Stadium

2009 Mid-American Conference football standings
	Conf.			Overall
Team	W		L	W		L
East Division
Ohio xy	7	–	1	9	–	5
Temple x	7	–	1	9	–	4
Bowling Green	6	–	2	7	–	6
Kent State	4	–	4	5	–	7
Buffalo	3	–	5	5	–	7
Akron	2	–	6	3	–	9
Miami (OH)	1	–	7	1	–	11
West Division
No. 23 Central Michigan x$	8	–	0	12	–	2
Northern Illinois	5	–	3	7	–	6
Western Michigan	4	–	4	5	–	7
Toledo	3	–	5	5	–	7
Ball State	2	–	6	2	–	10
Eastern Michigan	0	–	8	0	–	12
Championship: Central Michigan 20, Ohio 10
$ – Conference champion; x – Division champion/co-champions; y – Championship game participant; Rankings from AP Poll

The 2009 Ball State Cardinals football team represented Ball State University in the 2009 NCAA Division I FBS football season. Ball State competed as a member of the Mid-American Conference (MAC) West Division. The team was coached by Stan Parrish and played their home games at Scheumann Stadium. The finished with a record of 2–10 (2–6 MAC).

== Before the season ==
=== Recruiting ===
College recruiting information (2009)
Name	Hometown	School	Height	Weight	40^{‡}	Commit date
Jelani Alford; RB	Cincinnati, OH	Withrow HS	5 ft 8 in (1.73 m)	160 lb (73 kg)	4.48	Nov 8, 2008
Jelani Alford; RB	Recruit ratings: Scout: Rivals: (74)					
Alex Andrus; LB	Coopersville, MI	Coopersville HS	6 ft 3 in (1.91 m)	237 lb (108 kg)	–	Jul 27, 2008
Alex Andrus; LB	Recruit ratings: Scout: Rivals:					
David Brown; RB	Shelbyville, IN	Shelbyville Sr HS	5 ft 9 in (1.75 m)	190 lb (86 kg)	4.65	Oct 2, 2008
David Brown; RB	Recruit ratings: Scout: Rivals: (40)					
Otis Brown Jr. WR	Gainesville, FL	Gainesville HS	5 ft 8 in (1.73 m)	162 lb (73 kg)	4.47	Feb 4, 2009
Otis Brown Jr. WR	Recruit ratings: Scout: Rivals: (74)					
Ethan Buckles; DE	Indianapolis, IN	Cardinal Ritter HS	6 ft 7 in (2.01 m)	225 lb (102 kg)	4.9	Jul 26, 2008
Ethan Buckles; DE	Recruit ratings: Scout: Rivals: (40)					
Justin Cruz; LB	Jacksonville, FL	Fleming Island HS	6 ft 1 in (1.85 m)	196 lb (89 kg)	–	Jul 3, 2008
Justin Cruz; LB	Recruit ratings: Scout: Rivals: (71)					
Armand Dehaney; DB	Maple Heights, OH	Walsh Jesuit HS	5 ft 8 in (1.73 m)	180 lb (82 kg)	4.49	Jul 30, 2008
Armand Dehaney; DB	Recruit ratings: Scout: Rivals: (71)					
Theon Dixon; DB	Cleveland, OH	Glenville HS	5 ft 11 in (1.80 m)	170 lb (77 kg)	4.7	Feb 4, 2009
Theon Dixon; DB	Recruit ratings: Scout: Rivals: (40)					
Zane Fakes; RB	Plainfield, IN	Plainfield HS	6 ft 2 in (1.88 m)	220 lb (100 kg)	–	Feb 3, 2009
Zane Fakes; RB	Recruit ratings: Scout: Rivals: (40)					
Travis Freeman; LB	Cleveland, OH	Glenville HS	6 ft 1 in (1.85 m)	205 lb (93 kg)	4.7	Jan 25, 2009
Travis Freeman; LB	Recruit ratings: Scout: Rivals: (77)					
Jacob Green; TE	Cincinnati, OH	Wyoming HS	6 ft 4 in (1.93 m)	220 lb (100 kg)	4.7	Jul 3, 2008
Jacob Green; TE	Recruit ratings: Scout: Rivals: (78)					
Xavier Hines; DT	Cleveland, OH	N/A	6 ft 3 in (1.91 m)	240 lb (110 kg)	–	Feb 4, 2009
Xavier Hines; DT	Recruit ratings: Rivals:					
Donovan Jarrett; DT	Hamilton, OH	Hamilton HS	6 ft 2 in (1.88 m)	300 lb (140 kg)	–	Feb 4, 2009
Donovan Jarrett; DT	Recruit ratings: Scout: Rivals: (40)					
Branden Kish; RB	Amherst, OH	Marion L Steele HS	6 ft 1 in (1.85 m)	200 lb (91 kg)	4.6	Jul 6, 2008
Branden Kish; RB	Recruit ratings: Scout: Rivals: (45)					
Keith Langtry; WR	Kansas City, MO	Rockhurst HS	6 ft 2 in (1.88 m)	190 lb (86 kg)	4.5	Oct 10, 2008
Keith Langtry; WR	Recruit ratings: Scout: Rivals: (70)					
Tony Martin; LB	Park Hills, MO	Central HS	6 ft 1 in (1.85 m)	198 lb (90 kg)	4.59	Aug 12, 2008
Tony Martin; LB	Recruit ratings: Scout: Rivals: (68)					
Aaron Mershman; QB	Bowling Green, OH	Bowling Green HS	6 ft 2 in (1.88 m)	190 lb (86 kg)	4.7	Jul 16, 2008
Aaron Mershman; QB	Recruit ratings: Scout: Rivals: (73)					
Evan Neff; OL	Kettering, OH	Archbishop Alter HS	6 ft 4 in (1.93 m)	245 lb (111 kg)	5.02	Nov 6, 2008
Evan Neff; OL	Recruit ratings: Scout: Rivals: (40)					
Kitt O'Brien; OL	Walton, IN	Lewis Cass Jr-Sr HS	6 ft 6 in (1.98 m)	295 lb (134 kg)	–	Oct 21, 2008
Kitt O'Brien; OL	Recruit ratings: Scout: Rivals: (40)					
Matthew Page; OL	East Chicago, IN	East Chicago Central HS	6 ft 6 in (1.98 m)	300 lb (140 kg)	5.2	Jan 25, 2009
Matthew Page; OL	Recruit ratings: Scout: Rivals: (40)					
Jason Pinkston; DB	Cleveland, OH	Glenville HS	6 ft 2 in (1.88 m)	180 lb (82 kg)	–	Feb 4, 2009
Jason Pinkston; DB	Recruit ratings: Scout: Rivals: (40)					
Connor Ryan; WR	Cleveland, OH	St. Ignatius HS	6 ft 1 in (1.85 m)	180 lb (82 kg)	4.59	Sep 17, 2008
Connor Ryan; WR	Recruit ratings: Scout: Rivals: (73)					
Seth White; ATH	Columbus, OH	Bexley HS	5 ft 10 in (1.78 m)	180 lb (82 kg)	–	Dec 3, 2008
Seth White; ATH	Recruit ratings: Scout: Rivals: (40)					
Eric Williams; RB	Indianapolis, IN	Warren Central HS	6 ft 1 in (1.85 m)	200 lb (91 kg)	4.45	Nov 7, 2008
Eric Williams; RB	Recruit ratings: Scout: Rivals: (75)					
Overall recruit ranking: Scout: 101 Rivals: 104
‡ Refers to 40-yard dash; Note: In many cases, Scout, Rivals, 247Sports, On3, and ESPN may conflict in their listings of height, weight and 40 time.; In these cases, the average was taken. ESPN grades are on a 100-point scale.; Sources: "Ball State Commit List for 2009". Rivals.; "Football Recruiting: Ball State". Scout.; "Ball State Football Recruiting 2009". ESPN.; "Scout.com Team Recruiting Rankings". Scout.; "2009 Team Ranking". Rivals.com.

== Schedule ==
Date	Time	Opponent	Site	TV	Result	Attendance
September 3	7:30 p.m.	North Texas*	Scheumann Stadium; Muncie, IN	ESPNU	L 10–20	16,054
September 12	7:00 p.m.	No. 9 (FCS) New Hampshire*	Scheumann Stadium; Muncie, IN		L 16–23	11,884
September 19	12:00 p.m.	at Army*	Michie Stadium; West Point, NY	CBSCS	L 17–24	25,646
September 26	7:00 p.m.	at Auburn*	Jordan–Hare Stadium; Auburn, AL	FSN	L 30–54	83,118
October 3	12:00 p.m.	Toledo^{†}	Scheumann Stadium; Muncie, IN		L 30–37	14,140
October 10	1:00 p.m.	at Temple	Lincoln Financial Field; Philadelphia, PA		L 19–24	13,420
October 17	12:00 p.m.	Bowling Green	Scheumann Stadium; Muncie, IN		L 17–31	10,192
October 24	1:00 p.m.	at Eastern Michigan	Rynearson Stadium; Ypsilanti, MI		W 29–27	1,535
October 31	12:00 p.m.	Ohio	Scheumann Stadium; Muncie, IN		L 17–20	7,321
November 12	6:00 p.m.	at Northern Illinois	Huskie Stadium; DeKalb, IL (Bronze Stalk Trophy Game)	ESPNU	L 20–26	13,305
November 18	8:00 p.m.	Central Michigan	Scheumann Stadium; Muncie, IN	ESPN2	L 3–35	5,736
November 24	7:00 p.m.	at Western Michigan	Waldo Stadium; Kalamazoo, MI	ESPN2	W 22–17	20,344
*Non-conference game; ^{†}Homecoming; Rankings from Coaches' Poll released prior to the game; All times are in Eastern time

== Roster ==
As of 2009-08-21
Wide receivers: 1 Briggs Orsbon – Sophomore; 3 Seth White – Freshman; 4 Daniel Ifft – Junior; 12 Torieal Gibson – Sophomore; 28 Andre Dawson – (redshirt) freshman; 28 Mike Galiik – Freshman; 80 Jamill Smith – Freshman; 81 Connor Ryan – Freshman; 83 Jeremy Hill – Sophomore; 85 Keith Langtry – Freshman; 86 Otis Brown – Freshman; 87 Myles Trempe – Junior; 89 Trent Beane – (redshirt) freshman; 98 Sean Keller – Junior; Offensive line: 52 Evan Neff – Freshman; 54 Jerrod Gray – Sophomore; 58 J.T. Macy – Freshman; 63 Steve Yoder – (redshirt) freshman; 66 Kreg Hunter – Sophomore; 67 Travis Arnold – Junior; 69 Chad Davis – Senior; 70 Jordan Applegate – Senior; 72 Cameron Lowry – (redshirt) freshman; 73 Dan Manick – (redshirt) freshman; 74 Michael Switzer – Junior; 75 Matthew Page – Freshman; 76 Rayondon Kennedy – Sophomore; 77 Austin Holtz – (redshirt) freshman; 78 Kevin Gall – Sophomore; 79 Kitt O'Brien – Freshman; Tight ends: 43 Jacob Green – Freshman; 44 Ryan Hartke – Sophomore; 82 Madaris Grant – Senior; 84 Ryan Warmoth – Sophomore; 88 Zane Fakes – Freshman; 99 Barry Flynn – Freshman	Quarterbacks: 5 Kelly Page – (redshirt) freshman; 9 Logan Laughlin – Freshman; 11 Aaron Mershman – Freshman; 16 Brooks Medaris – Freshman; 17 Tanner Justice – Senior; Running backs: 2 Frank Edmonds – Junior; 6 Eric Williams – Freshman; 7 Cory Sykes – Sophomore; 21 David Brown – Freshman; 22 Ray Winkler – Junior; 27 Jelani Alford – Freshman; 33 MiQuale Lewis – Senior; 39 Brandon Kish – Freshman; 45 Michael Hunt – Junior; 47 Dwayne Donigan – Freshman; 49 Brent Bostic – (redshirt) freshman; Defensive line: 10 Jason Pinkston – Freshman; 13 Armand Dehaney – Freshman; 15 Jakeem Gregory – Junior; 19 Koreen Burch – Junior; 20 Brandon Carnegie – Junior; 34 Jeff Barker – Sophomore; 36 Pete Rolf – Sophomore; 41 Andrew Puthoff – Sophomore; 46 Joshua Howard – Sophomore; 51 Kaylon Woods – Junior; 60 Harold Hogue – Freshman; 61 Brian Hickman – (redshirt) freshman; 65 Drew Duffin – Senior; 90 Brandon Crawford – Senior; 91 Robert Eddins – Junior; 92 Jafe Pitcock – Sophomore; 93 Justin Woodard – Junior; 94 Ethan Buckles – Freshman; 95 Rene Perry – Junior; 96 Kyle Pettit – (redshirt) freshman; 97 Donovan Jarrett – Freshman; 99 Adam Morris – Sophomore	Linebackers: 8 Travis Freeman – Freshman; 24 Theon Dixon – Freshman; 30 John Buckingham – Junior; 31 Dane Cook – Junior; 32 Lorren Womack – Sophomore; 42 Davyd Jones – Junior; 47 Tony Martin – Freshman; 48 Spain Cosby – Senior; 50 Bill Huntsinger – Sophomore; 55 Sam Woodworth – Senior; 56 Justin Cruz – Freshman; Defensive backs: 9 Kyle Kuntz – Senior; 16 Charlie Todd – Junior; 23 Kyle Hoke – Sophomore; 25 Sean Baker – Sophomore; 27 Kevin Obyc – Freshman; 35 Zac Jordan – Sophomore; 37 Blake Barajas – (redshirt) freshman; 38 Alex Knipp – Senior; 40 Reid Scheidt – Junior; 43 Tad Kilburn – Junior; Punters: 18 Scott Kovanda – (redshirt) freshman; 26 Ian McGarvey – Junior; Kickers: 14 Steven Schott – (redshirt) freshman; 26 Ian McGarvey – Junior; 29 Jake Hogue – Junior; Long snapper: 53 Cody Muhlenkamp – Junior
† Starter at position * Injured; will not play in 2009.

== Coaching staff ==
Name	Position	Year at school
Stan Parrish	Head coach	1st
Doug Graber	Defensive coordinator	1st
Daryl Dixon	Secondary Coach	2nd
Eddie Faulkner	Offensive coordinator Running backs coach	5th
Deion Melvin	Linebackers coach	1st
John Powers	Recruiting coordinator Tight ends coach	4th
Phil Burnett	Defensive line coach	7th
Jason Eck	Offensive line coach	1st
Joey Lynch	Wide receivers coach	1st
Jay Hood	Defensive ends coach	1st

== Game summaries ==
=== North Texas ===
	1	2	3	4	Total
Mean Green	7	3	0	10	20
Cardinals	0	0	3	7	10

Scoring Summary

1st Quarter

- 09:24 NT Dunbar 3-yard run (Knott kick) 7–0 NT

2nd Quarter

- 01:19 NT Knott 24-yard field goal 10–0 NT

3rd Quarter

- 06:19 BSU McGarvey 21-yard field goal 10–3 NT

4th Quarter

- 12:41 BSU Lewis 27-yard run (McGarvey kick) 10–10
- 10:46 NT Outlaw 4-yard pass from Dodge (Knott kick) 17–10 NT
- 07:36 NT Knott 19-yard field goal 20–10 NT

=== New Hampshire ===
	1	2	3	4	Total
Wildcats	0	16	7	0	23
Cardinals	6	0	3	7	16

Scoring Summary

1st Quarter

- 12:42 BSU McGarvey 48-yard field goal 3–0 BSU
- 09:25 BSU McGarvey 47-yard field goal 6–0 BSU

2nd Quarter

- 13:50 UNH Jackson safety 6–2 BSU
- 09:36 UNH Orlando 26-yard pass from R.J. Toman (Manning kick) 6–9 UNH
- 03:16 UNH Jellison 5-yard run (Manning kick) 16–6 UNH

3rd Quarter

- 11:12 BSU McGarvey 37-yard field goal 16–9 UNH
- 03:47 UNH Jellison 8-yard run (Manning) 23–9 UNH

4th Quarter

- 08:50 BSU White 21-yard pass from Page (McGarvey kick) 23–16 UNH

=== Army ===
	1	2	3	4	Total
Cardinals	7	3	7	0	17
Black Knights	7	10	0	7	24

Scoring Summary

1st Quarter

- 06:22 ARMY Carter 1-yard run (Carlton kick) 7–0 ARMY
- 03:51 BSU Page 15-yard run (McGarvey kick) 7–7

2nd Quarter

- 13:37 ARMY Carlton 45-yard field goal 10–7 ARMY
- 07:15 BSU McGarvey 30-yard field goal 10–10
- 01:21 ARMY Villanueva 24-yard pass from Steelman (Carlton kick) 17–10 ARMY

3rd Quarter

- 09:57 BSU Gibson 34-yard pass from Page (McGarvey kick) 17–17

4th Quarter

- 06:41 ARMY Travis 18-yard interception return (Carlton kick) 24–17 ARMY

=== Auburn ===
	1	2	3	4	Total
Cardinals	7	3	7	13	30
Tigers	7	26	14	7	54

Scoring Summary

1st Quarter

- 12:26 BSU Lewis 2-yard run (McGarvey kick) 7–0 BSU
- 2:53 AU Trott 6-yard pass from Todd (Byrum kick) 7–7

2nd Quarter

- 13:47 AU Zachery 46-yard pass from Todd (Byrum kick) 7–14 AU
- 12:53 AU Bynes safety 7–16 AU
- 12:20 AU McCalebb 1-yard run (Byrum kick) 7–23 AU
- 8:22 AU Zachery 65-yard pass from Todd (Byrum kick) 7–30 AU
- 2:35 BSU McGarvey 33-yard field goal 10–30 AU
- 0:07 AU Byrum 32-yard field goal 10–33 AU

3rd Quarter

- 11:39 AU Adams 26-yard pass from Todd (Byrum kick) 10–40 AU
- 8:50 BSU Page 21-yard run (McGarvey kick) 17–40 AU
- 7:09 AU Fannin 36-yard pass from Todd (Byrum kick) 17–47 AU

4th Quarter

- 12:39 BSU Fakes 1-yard pass from Page (McGarvey kick) 24–47 AU
- 10:14 BSU McGarvey 37-yard field goal 27–47 AU
- 7:19 AU Caudle 52-yard run (Byrum kick) 27–54 AU
- 2:21 BSU McGarvey 33-yard field goal 30–54 AU

=== Toledo ===
	1	2	3	4	Total
Rockets	7	7	0	23	37
Cardinals	6	7	3	14	30

=== Temple ===
	1	2	3	4	Total
Cardinals	0	0	13	6	19
Owls	10	0	7	7	24

Scoring Summary

1st Quarter

- 07:12 TEMPLE McManus 27-yard field goal 0–3 TEMPLE
- 04:47 TEMPLE Nixon 28-yard pass from Charlton (McManus kick) 0–10 TEMPLE

3rd Quarter

- 10:59 BSU Gibson 50-yard pass from Page (McGarvey kick) 7–10 TEMPLE
- 08:47 BSU Williams 0-yard fumble recovery (McGarvey kick failed) 13–10 BSU
- 04:48 TEMPLE Pierce 2-yard run (McManus kick) 13–17 TEMPLE

4th Quarter

- 03:29 TEMPLE Pierce 3-yard run (McManus kick) 13–24 TEMPLE
- 00:00 BSU Ifft 2-yard pass from Page 19-24 TEMPLE

=== Bowling Green ===
	1	2	3	4	Total
Falcons	7	17	7	0	31
Cardinals	0	0	10	7	17

=== Eastern Michigan ===
	1	2	3	4	Total
Cardinals	6	7	16	0	29
Eagles	7	13	7	0	27

Scoring Summary

1st Quarter

- 9:08 EMU Thayer 3-yard pass from McMahon (Carithers kick) 0–7 EMU
- 4:52 BSU Sykes 51-yard run (Schott kick blocked) 6–7 EMU

2nd Quarter

- 10:59 EMU Carithers 20-yard field goal 6–10 EMU
- 9:23 EMU Welch 12-yard run (Carithers kick) 6–17 EMU
- 6:37 EMU Carithers 26-yard field goal 6–20 EMU
- 4:06 BSU Lewis 48-yard run (Schott kick) 13–20 EMU

3rd Quarter

- 10:44 EMU White 10-yard run (Carithers kick) 13–27 EMU
- 6:37 BSU Sykes 6-yard run (Schott kick) 20–27 EMU
- 5:33 BSU Team Safety 22–27 EMU
- 1:47 BSU Sykes 37-yard run (Schott kick) 29–27 BSU

=== Ohio ===
	1	2	3	4	Total
Bobcats	3	6	0	11	20
Cardinals	0	7	3	7	17

Scoring Summary

1st Quarter

- 4:12 OHIO Weller 39-yard field goal 3–0 OHIO

2nd Quarter

- 8:27 OHIO Weller 24-yard field goal 6–0 OHIO
- 5:16 BSU Williams 1-yard run (McGarvey kick) 6–7 BSU
- 0:00 OHIO Weller 52-yard field goal 9–7 OHIO

3rd Quarter

- 6:45 BSU McGarvey 22-yard field goal 9–10 BSU

4th Quarter

- 11:27 OHIO Weller 41-yard field goal 12–10 OHIO
- 5:52 BSU Hill 35-yard pass from Justice (McGarvey kick) 12–17 BSU
- 3:11 OHIO McCrae 7-yard pass from Scott (McCrae pass from Scott) 20–17 OHIO

=== Northern Illinois ===
	1	2	3	4	Total
Cardinals	7	6	0	7	20
Huskies	16	0	10	0	26

=== Central Michigan ===
	1	2	3	4	Total
Chippewas	7	14	14	0	35
Cardinals	0	3	0	0	3

=== Western Michigan ===
	1	2	3	4	Total
Cardinals	6	7	3	6	22
Broncos	0	10	0	7	17
