= 1994 Bowling Green Falcons football team =

American college football season

1994 Bowling Green Falcons football
- Conference: Mid-American Conference
- Record: 9–2 (7–1 MAC)
- Head coach: Gary Blackney (4th season)
- Defensive coordinator: Paul Ferraro (4th season)
- Home stadium: Doyt Perry Stadium

1994 Mid-American Conference football standings
	Conf.					Overall
Team	W		L		T	W		L		T
Central Michigan $	8	–	1	–	0	9	–	3	–	0
Bowling Green	7	–	1	–	0	9	–	2	–	0
Western Michigan	5	–	3	–	0	7	–	4	–	0
Miami (OH)	5	–	3	–	0	5	–	5	–	1
Ball State	5	–	3	–	1	5	–	5	–	1
Toledo	4	–	3	–	1	6	–	4	–	1
Eastern Michigan	5	–	4	–	0	5	–	6	–	0
Kent State	2	–	7	–	0	2	–	9	–	0
Akron	1	–	8	–	0	1	–	10	–	0
Ohio	0	–	9	–	0	0	–	11	–	0
$ – Conference champion

The 1994 Bowling Green Falcons football team was an American football team that represented Bowling Green University in the Mid-American Conference (MAC) during the 1994 NCAA Division I-A football season. In their fourth season under head coach Gary Blackney, the Falcons compiled a 9–2 record (7–1 against MAC opponents), finished in second place in the MAC, and outscored their opponents by a combined total of 391 to 174.

The team's statistical leaders included Ryan Henry with 2,368 passing yards, Keylan Cates with 803 rushing yards, and Ronnie Redd with 831 receiving yards.

== Schedule ==
Date	Opponent	Site	Result	Attendance	Source
September 1	at NC State*	Carter–Finley Stadium; Raleigh, NC	L 15–20	42,150	
September 10	at Akron	Rubber Bowl; Akron, OH	W 45–0		
September 17	Navy*	Doyt Perry Stadium; Bowling Green, OH	W 59–21		
September 24	at Eastern Michigan	Rynearson Stadium; Ypsilanti, MI	W 30–13		
October 1	at Cincinnati*	Nippert Stadium; Cincinnati, OH	W 38–0		
October 8	Ohio	Doyt Perry Stadium; Bowling Green, OH	W 32–0		
October 15	at Toledo	Glass Bowl; Toledo, OH (rivalry)	W 31–16		
October 22	Ball State	Doyt Perry Stadium; Bowling Green, OH	W 59–36		
October 29	Miami (OH)	Doyt Perry Stadium; Bowling Green, OH	W 27–16		
November 5	at Kent State	Dix Stadium; Kent, OH (Anniversary Award)	W 22–16		
November 12	Central Michigan	Doyt Perry Stadium; Bowling Green, OH	L 33–36		
*Non-conference game
