= 2016 Ball State Cardinals football team =

American college football season

2016 Ball State Cardinals football
- Conference: Mid-American Conference
- West Division
- Record: 4–8 (1–7 MAC)
- Head coach: Mike Neu (1st season)
- Offensive coordinator: Joey Lynch (3rd season)
- Offensive scheme: Spread
- Defensive coordinator: Tim Daoust (1st season)
- Base defense: 3–4
- Home stadium: Scheumann Stadium

2016 Mid-American Conference football standings
	Conf.			Overall
Team	W		L	W		L
East Division
Ohio xy	6	–	2	8	–	6
Miami (OH) x	6	–	2	6	–	7
Akron	3	–	5	5	–	7
Bowling Green	3	–	5	4	–	8
Kent State	2	–	6	3	–	9
Buffalo	1	–	7	2	–	10
West Division
No. 15 Western Michigan xy$	8	–	0	13	–	1
Toledo	6	–	2	9	–	4
Northern Illinois	5	–	3	5	–	7
Eastern Michigan	4	–	4	7	–	6
Central Michigan	3	–	5	6	–	7
Ball State	1	–	7	4	–	8
Championship: Western Michigan 29, Ohio 23
$ – Conference champion; x – Division champion/co-champions; y – Championship game participant; Rankings from AP Poll

The 2016 Ball State Cardinals football team represented Ball State University in the 2016 NCAA Division I FBS football season. They were led by first-year head coach Mike Neu and played their home games at Scheumann Stadium. They were a member of the West Division of the Mid-American Conference. They finished the season 4–8, 1–7 in MAC play to finish in last place in the West Division.

== Schedule ==
Date	Time	Opponent	Site	TV	Result	Attendance
September 2	7:00 pm	at Georgia State*	Georgia Dome; Atlanta, GA	ASN, ESPN3	W 31–21	12,233
September 10	4:00 pm	at Indiana*	Memorial Stadium; Bloomington, IN	ESPNews	L 20–30	41,374
September 17	3:00 pm	Eastern Kentucky*	Scheumann Stadium; Muncie, IN	ESPN3	W 41–14	10,902
September 24	6:00 pm	at Florida Atlantic*	FAU Stadium; Boca Raton, FL	CUSA.tv	W 31–27	13,846
October 1	3:30 pm	Northern Illinois	Scheumann Stadium; Muncie, IN (Bronze Stalk Trophy)	ASN	L 24–31	7,249
October 8	3:00 pm	at Central Michigan	Kelly/Shorts Stadium; Mount Pleasant, MI	ASN	L 21–24	20,044
October 15	3:30 pm	at Buffalo	University at Buffalo Stadium; Amherst, NY	ESPN3	W 31–21	16,092
October 22	3:00 pm	Akron^{†}	Scheumann Stadium; Muncie, IN	ESPN3	L 25–35	10,739
November 1	8:00 pm	No. 17 Western Michigan	Scheumann Stadium; Muncie, IN	ESPN2	L 20–52	5,614
November 8	7:30 pm	Eastern Michigan	Scheumann Stadium; Muncie, IN	CBSSN	L 41–48	4,442
November 16	7:00 pm	at Toledo	Glass Bowl; Toledo, OH	ESPN2	L 19–37	16,826
November 22	7:00 pm	at Miami (OH)	Yager Stadium; Oxford, OH	ESPN3	L 20–21	13,824
*Non-conference game; ^{†}Homecoming; Rankings from AP Poll released prior to the game; All times are in Eastern time

== Game summaries ==
=== At Georgia State ===
	1	2	3	4	Total
Cardinals	7	7	3	14	31
Panthers	7	7	0	7	21

=== At Indiana ===
	1	2	3	4	Total
Cardinals	0	0	3	17	20
Hoosiers	10	10	10	0	30

=== Eastern Kentucky ===
	1	2	3	4	Total
Colonels	0	0	0	14	14
Cardinals	14	13	7	7	41

=== At Florida Atlantic ===
	1	2	3	4	Total
Cardinals	0	17	7	7	31
Owls	14	10	0	3	27

=== Northern Illinois ===
	1	2	3	4	Total
Huskies	10	14	0	7	31
Cardinals	10	7	0	7	24

=== At Central Michigan ===
	1	2	3	4	Total
Cardinals	7	0	7	7	21
Chippewas	3	14	0	7	24

=== At Buffalo ===
	1	2	3	4	Total
Cardinals	7	0	14	10	31
Bulls	7	7	0	7	21

=== Akron ===
	1	2	3	4	Total
Zips	0	7	14	14	35
Cardinals	7	10	0	8	25

=== Western Michigan ===
	1	2	3	4	Total
#17 Broncos	21	7	14	10	52
Cardinals	7	3	3	7	20

=== Eastern Michigan ===
	1	2	3	4	Total
Eagles	3	16	14	15	48
Cardinals	21	7	0	13	41

=== At Toledo ===
	1	2	3	4	Total
Cardinals	0	10	3	6	19
Rockets	14	6	17	0	37

=== At Miami (OH) ===
	1	2	3	4	Total
Cardinals	7	10	3	0	20
RedHawks	7	0	7	7	21
