= 1994 Western Michigan Broncos football team =

American college football season

1994 Western Michigan Broncos football
- Conference: Mid-American Conference
- Record: 7–4 (5–3 MAC)
- Head coach: Al Molde (8th season)
- Offensive coordinator: Rob Kuhlman
- Defensive coordinator: Larry Edlund
- MVP: Jay McDonagh
- Home stadium: Waldo Stadium

1994 Mid-American Conference football standings
	Conf.					Overall
Team	W		L		T	W		L		T
Central Michigan $	8	–	1	–	0	9	–	3	–	0
Bowling Green	7	–	1	–	0	9	–	2	–	0
Western Michigan	5	–	3	–	0	7	–	4	–	0
Miami (OH)	5	–	3	–	0	5	–	5	–	1
Ball State	5	–	3	–	1	5	–	5	–	1
Toledo	4	–	3	–	1	6	–	4	–	1
Eastern Michigan	5	–	4	–	0	5	–	6	–	0
Kent State	2	–	7	–	0	2	–	9	–	0
Akron	1	–	8	–	0	1	–	10	–	0
Ohio	0	–	9	–	0	0	–	11	–	0
$ – Conference champion

The 1994 Western Michigan Broncos football team represented Western Michigan University in the Mid-American Conference (MAC) during the 1994 NCAA Division I-A football season. In their eighth season under head coach Al Molde, the Broncos compiled a 7–4 record (5–4 against MAC opponents), finished in a tie for third place in the MAC, and outscored their opponents, 274 to 189. The team played its home games at Waldo Stadium in Kalamazoo, Michigan.

The team's statistical leaders included Jay McDonagh with 2,136 passing yards, Jim Vackaro with 910 rushing yards, and Andre Wallace with 758 receiving yards.

== Schedule ==
Date	Opponent	Site	Result	Attendance	Source
September 3	at Miami (OH)	Yager Stadium; Oxford, OH	W 28–25		
September 8	Western Illinois*	Waldo Stadium; Kalamazoo, MI	W 43–7	30,734	
September 17	at Iowa State*	Cyclone Stadium; Ames, IA	W 23–19	32,080	
September 24	Akron	Waldo Stadium; Kalamazoo, MI	W 19–6		
October 1	Kent State	Waldo Stadium; Kalamazoo, MI	W 24–10		
October 8	at Central Michigan	Kelly/Shorts Stadium; Mount Pleasant, MI (rivalry)	L 28–35		
October 15	at Ball State	Ball State Stadium; Muncie, IN	L 13–16		
October 22	Eastern Michigan	Waldo Stadium; Kalamazoo, MI (rivalry)	W 33–14		
November 5	Ohio	Waldo Stadium; Kalamazoo, MI	W 15–3		
November 12	at Toledo	Glass Bowl; Toledo, OH	L 34–37		
November 19	at Southwestern Louisiana*	Cajun Field; Lafayette, LA	L 14–17		
*Non-conference game
