= 1994 Central Michigan Chippewas football team =

American college football season

1994 Central Michigan Chippewas football

MAC champion

Las Vegas Bowl, L 24–52 vs. UNLV
- Conference: Mid-American Conference
- Record: 9–3 (8–1 MAC)
- Head coach: Dick Flynn (1st season)
- Offensive coordinator: Tom Kearly (4th season)
- Defensive coordinator: Jim Schulte (1st season)
- MVP: Brian Pruitt
- Home stadium: Kelly/Shorts Stadium

1994 Mid-American Conference football standings
	Conf.					Overall
Team	W		L		T	W		L		T
Central Michigan $	8	–	1	–	0	9	–	3	–	0
Bowling Green	7	–	1	–	0	9	–	2	–	0
Western Michigan	5	–	3	–	0	7	–	4	–	0
Miami (OH)	5	–	3	–	0	5	–	5	–	1
Ball State	5	–	3	–	1	5	–	5	–	1
Toledo	4	–	3	–	1	6	–	4	–	1
Eastern Michigan	5	–	4	–	0	5	–	6	–	0
Kent State	2	–	7	–	0	2	–	9	–	0
Akron	1	–	8	–	0	1	–	10	–	0
Ohio	0	–	9	–	0	0	–	11	–	0
$ – Conference champion

The 1994 Central Michigan Chippewas football team represented Central Michigan University in the Mid-American Conference (MAC) during the 1994 NCAA Division I-A football season. In their first season under head coach Dick Flynn, the Chippewas compiled a 9–3 record (8–1 against MAC opponents), won the MAC championship, lost to UNLV in the Las Vegas Bowl, and outscored their opponents, 400 to 315. The team played its home games in Kelly/Shorts Stadium in Mount Pleasant, Michigan, with attendance of 104,144 in five home games.

The team's statistical leaders included quarterback Erik Timpf with 1,315 passing yards, tailback Brian Pruitt with 1,890 rushing yards, and flanker Terrance McMillan with 398 receiving yards. Pruitt's 1,890 rushing yards remains a Central Michigan record, as do his 1994 totals of 132 points scored, 20 rushing touchdowns, and 22 total touchdowns in a season. His tally of 435 yards of total offense against Toledo on November 5, 1994, remains a school record, and his total of 356 rushing yards in the same game was a school record until Robbie Mixon rushed for 377 yards in a game in 2002. Pruitt was selected by the Associated Press as a first-team all-purpose player on the 1994 College Football All-America Team. He was also named the MAC Player of the Year and Central Michigan's most valuable player. Pruitt, tight end Jerremy Dunlap, offensive guard Matt Nastally, and safety Quincy Wright were selected as first-team All-MAC player.

Dick Flynn was named MAC Coach of the Year in his first year as head coach. Flynn took over as Central Michigan's head football coach in March 1994, after Herb Deromedi became the school's athletic director.

== Schedule ==
Date	Time	Opponent	Site	Result	Attendance	Source
September 3	2:00 p.m.	at Iowa*	Kinnick Stadium; Iowa City, IA	L 21–52	66,520	
September 10		UNLV*	Kelly/Shorts Stadium; Mount Pleasant, MI	W 35–23	20,316	
September 17		at Eastern Michigan	Rynearson Stadium; Ypsilanti, MI (rivalry)	W 30–29		
September 24		Kent State	Kelly/Shorts Stadium; Mount Pleasant, MI	W 45–0		
October 1		at Ball State	Ball State Stadium; Muncie, IN	L 28–31		
October 8		Western Michigan	Kelly/Shorts Stadium; Mount Pleasant, MI (rivalry)	W 35–28		
October 15		at Akron	Rubber Bowl; Akron, IN	W 47–0		
October 22		Miami (OH)	Kelly/Shorts Stadium; Mount Pleasant, MI	W 32–30		
October 29		at Ohio	Peden Stadium; Athens, OH	W 22–10		
November 5		Toledo	Kelly/Shorts Stadium; Mount Pleasant, MI	W 45–27		
November 12		at Bowling Green	Doyt Perry Stadium; Bowling Green, OH	W 36–33		
December 15		vs. UNLV*	Sam Boyd Stadium; Whitney, NV (Las Vegas Bowl)	L 24–52	17,562	
*Non-conference game; All times are in Eastern time

== Roster ==
1994 Central Michigan Chippewas football team roster
Players
Coaches
Offense

Pos.	#	Name	Class
QB	9	Tim Crowley	Fr
QB	7	Chad Darnell	So
TE	88	Jerremy Dunlap	Sr
WR	14	Grant Elmquist	Jr
C	51	Brock Gutierrez	Jr
WR	80	Adam Kerr	Fr
FB	42	John King	Sr
WR	25	Andy Korytkowski	Sr
OT	79	Scott Rehberg	So

Defense

Pos.	#	Name	Class
DB	3	Tom Banks	Sr
DB	1	Thomas Creguer	Sr
LB	59	Shawn Deer	So
OLB	89	Joe Fortuna	Fr
LB	56	Karl Gielarowski	Jr
LB	53	Cory Gildersleeve	So
DT	91	Chris list	Jr
LB	99	Karl Miller	Sr
DT	93	Patrick O'Connell	Jr
DB	22	Malcolm Thomas	Sr

Special teams

Pos.	#	Name	Class
K	15	Alex Kemp	Jr

Head coach

- Dick Flynn

Coordinators/assistant coaches

Legend

- (C) Team captain
- (S) Suspended
- (I) Ineligible
- Injured
- Redshirt
