= 1994 Eastern Michigan Eagles football team =

American college football season

1994 Eastern Michigan Eagles football
- Conference: Mid-American Conference
- Record: 5–6 (5–4 MAC)
- Head coach: Ron Cooper (2nd season)
- Offensive coordinator: Richard Wilson (2nd season)
- Defensive coordinator: Thomas Roggeman (2nd season)
- Captain: Game captains
- Home stadium: Rynearson Stadium

1994 Mid-American Conference football standings
	Conf.					Overall
Team	W		L		T	W		L		T
Central Michigan $	8	–	1	–	0	9	–	3	–	0
Bowling Green	7	–	1	–	0	9	–	2	–	0
Western Michigan	5	–	3	–	0	7	–	4	–	0
Miami (OH)	5	–	3	–	0	5	–	5	–	1
Ball State	5	–	3	–	1	5	–	5	–	1
Toledo	4	–	3	–	1	6	–	4	–	1
Eastern Michigan	5	–	4	–	0	5	–	6	–	0
Kent State	2	–	7	–	0	2	–	9	–	0
Akron	1	–	8	–	0	1	–	10	–	0
Ohio	0	–	9	–	0	0	–	11	–	0
$ – Conference champion

The 1994 Eastern Michigan Eagles football team represented Eastern Michigan University in the 1994 NCAA Division I-A football season. In their second and final season under head coach Ron Cooper, the Eagles compiled a 5–6 record (5–4 against conference opponents), finished in seventh place in the Mid-American Conference, and were outscored by their opponents, 285 to 247. The team's statistical leaders included Michael Armour with 1,629 passing yards, Stephen Whitfield with 1,232 rushing yards, and Steve Clay with 589 receiving yards.

== Schedule ==
Date	Opponent	Site	Result	Attendance	Source
September 3	at UNLV*	Sam Boyd Stadium; Whitney, NV	L 3–17	10,756	
September 10	at No. 10 Wisconsin*	Camp Randall Stadium; Madison, WI	L 0–56	77,745	
September 17	Central Michigan	Rynearson Stadium; Ypsilanti, MI (rivalry)	L 29–30		
September 24	Bowling Green^{†}	Rynearson Stadium; Ypsilanti, MI	L 13–30		
October 1	Miami (OH)	Rynearson Stadium; Ypsilanti, MI	L 17–21		
October 8	at Kent State	Dix Stadium; Kent, OH	W 24–10		
October 22	at Western Michigan	Waldo Stadium; Kalamazoo, MI	L 14–33		
October 29	at Ball State	Ball State Stadium; Muncie, IN	W 41–10		
November 5	Akron	Rynearson Stadium; Ypsilanti, MI	W 42–18		
November 12	at Ohio	Peden Stadium; Athens, OH	W 24–13		
November 19	Toledo	Rynearson Stadium; Ypsilanti, MI	W 40–37		
*Non-conference game; ^{†}Homecoming; Rankings from AP Poll released prior to the game
