= 1994 Toledo Rockets football team =

American college football season

1994 Toledo Rockets football
- Conference: Mid-American Conference
- Record: 6–4–1 (4–3–1 MAC)
- Head coach: Gary Pinkel (4th season)
- Offensive coordinator: Mike Dunbar (3rd season)
- Offensive scheme: Pro-style
- Defensive coordinator: Tom Amstutz (1st season)
- Base defense: 4–4
- Home stadium: Glass Bowl

1994 Mid-American Conference football standings
	Conf.					Overall
Team	W		L		T	W		L		T
Central Michigan $	8	–	1	–	0	9	–	3	–	0
Bowling Green	7	–	1	–	0	9	–	2	–	0
Western Michigan	5	–	3	–	0	7	–	4	–	0
Miami (OH)	5	–	3	–	0	5	–	5	–	1
Ball State	5	–	3	–	1	5	–	5	–	1
Toledo	4	–	3	–	1	6	–	4	–	1
Eastern Michigan	5	–	4	–	0	5	–	6	–	0
Kent State	2	–	7	–	0	2	–	9	–	0
Akron	1	–	8	–	0	1	–	10	–	0
Ohio	0	–	9	–	0	0	–	11	–	0
$ – Conference champion

The 1994 Toledo Rockets football team was an American football team that represented the University of Toledo in the Mid-American Conference (MAC) during the 1994 NCAA Division I-A football season. In their fourth season under head coach Gary Pinkel, the Rockets compiled a 6–4–1 record (4–3–1 against MAC opponents), finished in sixth place in the MAC, and outscored all opponents by a combined total of 352 to 324.

The team's statistical leaders included Ryan Huzjak with 1,928 passing yards, Casey McBeth with 1,053 rushing yards, and Scott Brunswick with 572 receiving yards.

== Schedule ==
Date	Opponent	Site	Result	Attendance	Source
September 3	Indiana State*	Glass Bowl; Toledo, OH	W 20–17		
September 10	at Purdue*	Ross–Ade Stadium; West Lafayette, IN	L 17–51	48,962	
September 17	Liberty*	Glass Bowl; Toledo, OH	W 47–37	19,910	
October 1	at Ohio	Peden Stadium; Athens, OH	W 31–6		
October 8	Ball State	Glass Bowl; Toledo, OH	T 24–24		
October 15	Bowling Green	Glass Bowl; Toledo, OH (rivalry)	L 16–31		
October 22	at Akron	Rubber Bowl; Akron, OH	W 48–25		
October 29	Kent State	Glass Bowl; Toledo, OH	W 48–14		
November 5	at Central Michigan	Kelly/Shorts Stadium; Mount Pleasant, MI	L 27–45		
November 12	Western Michigan	Glass Bowl; Toledo, OH	W 37–34		
November 19	at Eastern Michigan	Rynearson Stadium; Ypsilanti, MI	L 37–40		
*Non-conference game
