= 2009 MAC Championship Game =

2009 Marathon MAC Championship Game
- Conference Championship
- 2009 Marathon MAC Championship Game Logo
Ohio Bobcats	Central Michigan Chippewas
(9–3)	(10–2)
10	20
Head coach: Frank Solich	Head coach: Butch Jones
	1	2	3	4	Total
Ohio	7	0	3	0	10
Central Michigan	10	7	3	0	20
- Date: December 4, 2009
- Season: 2009
- Stadium: Ford Field
- Location: Detroit, Michigan
- MVP: Dan LeFevour (QB, CMU)
- Favorite: CMU by 13
- Referee: Tony Cannella
- Attendance: 23,714

United States TV coverage
- Network: ESPN2
- Announcers: Joe Tessitore (play-by-play); Rod Gilmore (analysis); Quint Kessenich (sideline)

The 2009 Marathon MAC Championship Game was a college football game played by the Central Michigan Chippewas and the Ohio Bobcats. The game, sponsored by Marathon Oil, was the final regular season contest of the 2009 college football season for the Mid-American Conference. The game was held at Ford Field in Detroit, Michigan, where it was moved to following the 2003 MAC Championship Game.

The Ohio Bobcats were selected to represent the East Division by virtue of a tie-breaking head-to-head victory against the Temple Owls in the final game prior to the championship game. They ended the season with a 9–3 record, including 7–1 in MAC play. The West Division is represented by Central Michigan, who had a 10–2 record prior to the game, including a perfect 8–0 in the MAC. This game was a rematch of the 2006 game, where the Chippewas came out victorious in a 31–10 decision.

== Selection process ==
2009 Mid-American Conference football standings
	Conf.			Overall
Team	W		L	W		L
East Division
Ohio xy	7	–	1	9	–	5
Temple x	7	–	1	9	–	4
Bowling Green	6	–	2	7	–	6
Kent State	4	–	4	5	–	7
Buffalo	3	–	5	5	–	7
Akron	2	–	6	3	–	9
Miami (OH)	1	–	7	1	–	11
West Division
No. 23 Central Michigan x$	8	–	0	12	–	2
Northern Illinois	5	–	3	7	–	6
Western Michigan	4	–	4	5	–	7
Toledo	3	–	5	5	–	7
Ball State	2	–	6	2	–	10
Eastern Michigan	0	–	8	0	–	12
Championship: Central Michigan 20, Ohio 10
$ – Conference champion; x – Division champion/co-champions; y – Championship game participant; Rankings from AP Poll

The MAC Championship Game matches the winners of the East and West divisions of the Mid-American Conference. The game began in the 1997 season when the MAC added Northern Illinois and Marshall. This expanded the league to twelve teams, and therefore the conference was able to hold a conference championship game under National Collegiate Athletic Association (NCAA) rules.

The divisional champions are selected through a lengthy tiebreaker scenario. However, the scenario wasn't required as only two teams were tied in the East Division. Temple and Ohio both ended the season with a 7–1 conference record. Ohio's win over the Temple Owls in the final game of the regular season allowed the Bobcats to advance to the Championship Game. In the West Division, only the Central Michigan Chippewas finished the game with an 8–0 conference record, and would therefore be the team chosen to represent their division.

=== Central Michigan ===
The Central Michigan Chippewas entered the 2009 college football season after going 8–5 during the 2008 season. Although that didn't earn them a bid into the 2008 MAC Championship Game, they were able to go to the 2008 Motor City Bowl, where they would lose to the Florida Atlantic Owls in a 21–24 decision. In the MAC Preseason Media Poll, the Chippewas received 154 points, and was chosen to win the West Division of the conference.

Central Michigan began their 2009 season with a 6–19 loss to Arizona. However, in their next game against Big Ten opponent Michigan State, the Chippewas came out victorious, thanks to a game-ending field goal. In their home opener against the Braves of Alcorn State, the Chippewas had their way with a 48–0 victory, and they would end the first part of their out-of-conference season with a 2–1 record.

They began conference play with a 48–21 victory over Akron, with starting quarterback Dan LeFevour having a hand in six of the seven Chippewa touchdowns. After that they traveled to Buffalo to post a 20–13 win over the Bulls. In the first quarter of the game, LeFevour broke Byron Leftwich's previous MAC record of 939 completions in a career. After victories over Eastern Michigan and Western Michigan, the Chippewas were able to claim the Michigan MAC Trophy for 2009. After a 24–10 victory over the Bowling Green Falcons, Central Michigan held a 5–0 conference record before traveling to Boston College for their final out-of-conference match-up.

Although Central Michigan scored the first points on a 34-yard field goal, Boston College was able to contain LeFevour and the Chippewas. CMU ended up losing the contest to a final score of 10–31. The final three games on the Chippewas' schedule were three straight MAC contests, two of them held in Kelly/Shorts Stadium. The first of these three games was a high-scoring 56–28 victory over the Toledo Rockets. They followed that with a 35–3 victory over Ball State in Scheumann Stadium, and then returned home to defeat Northern Illinois in a 45–31 decision.

=== Ohio ===
After finishing the 2008 season with a dismal 4–8 record (including 3–5 in the conference), the Bobcats were able to make a comeback, finishing this season 9–3 with a 7–1 record in the conference. In the preseason media poll, the Bobcats were selected fourth in their division, receiving only 116 votes, in comparison to Buffalo, who was selected to win their division, earning 155 points.

Along with the Chippewas, the Bobcats began their season with a loss, theirs coming 16–23 in the hands of UConn. However, they were able to win their next two out-of-conference games. In a contest against North Texas, the Bobcats were able come back to a 20–20 tie at the end of regulation. In the first overtime, both teams managed to score field goals, putting the game at 23–23 before the second overtime. In the second overtime, North Texas was able to score first on a 7-yard Cam Montgomery touchdown. Ohio answered back on a 15-yard pass from Theo Scott, however instead of a tradition extra point attempt, Ohio went for two points, once again a pass from Scott to wide receiver Taylor Price to seal the victory. In their next game, they faced Cal Poly in Athens and came out with a 28–10 victory. The Bobcats finished their out-of-conference season against Tennessee, losing that match 23–34.

The Bobcats then began their MAC season against fellow East Division member Bowling Green. With two passing touchdowns and another running touchdown from Scott, Ohio was able to come out victorious with a 44–37 final score. Ohio then traveled to InfoCision Stadium, to visit the Akron Zips in their new home. They were able to upset the Zips, leaving with a 19–7 victory. After that game, they returned home to face the Miami RedHawks at Peden Stadium, and won 28–7. Their one conference loss came at the hands of Kent State, where they lost at home. The only scoring that was allowed by the Flashes was a 22-yard field goal by Matt Weller and an 87-yard punt return for a touchdown.

The final four games of the season proved to be a launching pad for the Bobcats heading into the championship game. In a contest at Ball State, the Bobcats scored a touchdown with three minutes remaining to put them ahead 20–17. They were also able to win on the road against Buffalo in a nationally televised contest on ESPN2. The final two games of the Bobcats season were both played at home, where they defeated Northern Illinois by a score of 38–31 and Temple with a score of 35–17. That victory against Temple also became the tiebreaker which sent Ohio to the championship game.
