= 1994 Miami Redskins football team =

American college football season

1994 Miami Redskins football
- Conference: Mid-American Conference
- Record: 5–5–1 (5–3 MAC)
- Head coach: Randy Walker (5th season)
- Offensive coordinator: Kevin Wilson (3rd season)
- Defensive coordinator: Tim Carras (5th season)
- Home stadium: Yager Stadium

1994 Mid-American Conference football standings
	Conf.					Overall
Team	W		L		T	W		L		T
Central Michigan $	8	–	1	–	0	9	–	3	–	0
Bowling Green	7	–	1	–	0	9	–	2	–	0
Western Michigan	5	–	3	–	0	7	–	4	–	0
Miami (OH)	5	–	3	–	0	5	–	5	–	1
Ball State	5	–	3	–	1	5	–	5	–	1
Toledo	4	–	3	–	1	6	–	4	–	1
Eastern Michigan	5	–	4	–	0	5	–	6	–	0
Kent State	2	–	7	–	0	2	–	9	–	0
Akron	1	–	8	–	0	1	–	10	–	0
Ohio	0	–	9	–	0	0	–	11	–	0
$ – Conference champion

The 1994 Miami Redskins football team was an American football team that represented Miami University in the Mid-American Conference (MAC) during the 1994 NCAA Division I-A football season. In its fifth season under head coach Randy Walker, the team compiled a 5–5–1 record (5–3 against MAC opponents), finished in a tie for third place in the MAC, and outscored all opponents by a combined total of 262 to 260.

The team's statistical leaders included Neil Dougherty with 1,431 passing yards, Deland McCullough with 1,103 rushing yards, and Eric Henderson with 560 receiving yards.

== Schedule ==
Date	Opponent	Site	Result	Attendance
September 3	Western Michigan	Yager Stadium; Oxford, OH	L 25–28	
September 10	at Indiana*	Memorial Stadium; Bloomington, IN	L 14–35	
September 17	Cincinnati*	Yager Stadium; Oxford, OH (rivalry)	T 17–17	
September 24	at Michigan State*	Spartan Stadium; East Lansing, MI	L 10–45	61,224
October 1	at Eastern Michigan	Rynearson Stadium; Ypsilanti, MI	W 21–17	
October 8	Akron	Yager Stadium; Oxford, OH	W 50–14	
October 15	at Ohio	Peden Stadium; Athens, OH (rivalry)	W 31–10	
October 22	at Central Michigan	Kelly/Shorts Stadium; Mount Pleasant, MI	L 30–32	
October 29	at Bowling Green	Doyt Perry Stadium; Bowling Green, OH	L 16–27	
November 5	at Ball State	Yager Stadium; Oxford, OH	W 24–21	
November 12	Kent State	Yager Stadium; Oxford, OH	W 24–14	
*Non-conference game

== Roster ==
1994 Miami Redskins football team roster
Players			Coaches
Offense: Pos. / # / Name / Class; TE / 80 / Eric Beverly / So	Defense: Pos. / # / Name / Class	Special teams: Pos. / # / Name / Class	Head coach: Randy Walker; Coordinators/assistant coaches Kevin Wilson (Offensive Coordinator/OL) Tim Carras (Defensive Coordinator/Inside Linebackers) Jack Glowik (Defensive Line/Special Teams) Terry Hoeppner (Secondary) Ron Johnson (Running Backs) Aaron Kromer (Tight Ends) Sean Payton (Quarterbacks) Jay Peterson (Linebackers) Sheldon White (Wide Receivers) Legend: (C) Team captain; (S) Suspended; (I) Ineligible; Injured; Redshirt
