= 1994 Ohio Bobcats football team =

American college football season

1994 Ohio Bobcats football
- Conference: Mid-American Conference
- Record: 0–11 (0–9 MAC)
- Head coach: Tom Lichtenberg (5th season)
- Home stadium: Peden Stadium

1994 Mid-American Conference football standings
	Conf.					Overall
Team	W		L		T	W		L		T
Central Michigan $	8	–	1	–	0	9	–	3	–	0
Bowling Green	7	–	1	–	0	9	–	2	–	0
Western Michigan	5	–	3	–	0	7	–	4	–	0
Miami (OH)	5	–	3	–	0	5	–	5	–	1
Ball State	5	–	3	–	1	5	–	5	–	1
Toledo	4	–	3	–	1	6	–	4	–	1
Eastern Michigan	5	–	4	–	0	5	–	6	–	0
Kent State	2	–	7	–	0	2	–	9	–	0
Akron	1	–	8	–	0	1	–	10	–	0
Ohio	0	–	9	–	0	0	–	11	–	0
$ – Conference champion

The 1994 Ohio Bobcats football team was an American football team that represented Ohio University in the Mid-American Conference (MAC) during the 1994 NCAA Division I-A football season. In their fifth and final season under head coach Tom Lichtenberg, the Bobcats compiled a 0–11 record (0–9 against MAC opponents), finished in last place in the MAC, and were outscored by all opponents by a combined total of 259 to 82. They played their home games in Peden Stadium in Athens, Ohio.

== Schedule ==
Date	Opponent	Site	Result	Attendance
September 10	at Pittsburgh*	Pitt Stadium; Pittsburgh, PA	L 16–30	33,194
September 17	Utah State*	Peden Stadium; Athens, OH	L 0–5	5,940
September 24	at Ball State	Ball State Stadium; Muncie, IN	L 14–21	
October 1	Toledo	Peden Stadium; Athens, OH	L 6–31	
October 8	at Bowling Green	Doyt Perry Stadium; Bowling Green, OH	L 0–32	
October 15	Miami (OH)	Peden Stadium; Athens, OH (rivalry)	L 10–31	
October 22	at Kent State	Dix Stadium; Kent, OH	L 0–24	
October 29	Central Michigan	Peden Stadium; Athens, OH	L 10–22	
November 5	at Western Michigan	Waldo Stadium; Kalamazoo, MI	L 3–15	
November 12	Eastern Michigan	Peden Stadium; Athens, OH	L 13–24	
November 19	at Akron	Rubber Bowl; Akron, OH	L 10–24	
*Non-conference game
