= 1994 Akron Zips football team =

American college football season

1994 Akron Zips football
- Conference: Mid-American Conference
- Record: 1–10 (1–8 MAC)
- Head coach: Gerry Faust (9th season)
- Defensive coordinator: Bob Junko (7th season)
- Home stadium: Rubber Bowl

1994 Mid-American Conference football standings
	Conf.					Overall
Team	W		L		T	W		L		T
Central Michigan $	8	–	1	–	0	9	–	3	–	0
Bowling Green	7	–	1	–	0	9	–	2	–	0
Western Michigan	5	–	3	–	0	7	–	4	–	0
Miami (OH)	5	–	3	–	0	5	–	5	–	1
Ball State	5	–	3	–	1	5	–	5	–	1
Toledo	4	–	3	–	1	6	–	4	–	1
Eastern Michigan	5	–	4	–	0	5	–	6	–	0
Kent State	2	–	7	–	0	2	–	9	–	0
Akron	1	–	8	–	0	1	–	10	–	0
Ohio	0	–	9	–	0	0	–	11	–	0
$ – Conference champion

The 1994 Akron Zips football team represented Akron University in the 1994 NCAA Division I-A football season as members of the Mid-American Conference. They were led by ninth–year head coach Gerry Faust. The Zips played their home games at the Rubber Bowl in Akron, Ohio. They finished the season with a record of 1–10, 1–8 in MAC play to finish in a tie for ninth place.

After the season, head coach Gerry Faust was relieved of his coaching duties. He finished at Akron with a record of 43–53–3.

== Schedule ==
Date	Opponent	Site	Result	Attendance	Source
September 3	Temple*	Rubber Bowl; Akron, OH	L 7–32		
September 10	Bowling Green	Rubber Bowl; Akron, OH	L 0–45		
September 17	at Kent State	Dix Stadium; Kent, OH (Wagon Wheel)	L 16–32		
September 24	at Western Michigan	Waldo Stadium; Kalamazoo, MI	L 6–19		
October 8	at Miami (OH)	Yager Stadium; Oxford, OH	L 14–50		
October 15	Central Michigan	Rubber Bowl; Akron, OH	L 0–47		
October 22	Toledo	Rubber Bowl; Akron, OH	L 25–48		
October 29	at No. 2 (I-AA) Youngstown State*	Stambaugh Stadium; Youngstown, OH (Steel Tire)	L 7–41	17,760	
November 5	at Eastern Michigan	Rynearson Stadium; Ypsilanti, MI	L 18–42		
November 12	at Ball State	Ball State Stadium; Muncie, IN	L 28–38		
November 19	Ohio	Rubber Bowl; Akron, OH	W 24–10		
*Non-conference game; Rankings from The Sports Network Poll released prior to the game
