= 1994 Kent State Golden Flashes football team =

American college football season

1994 Kent State Golden Flashes football
- Conference: Mid-American Conference
- Record: 2–9 (2–7 MAC)
- Head coach: Jim Corrigall (1st season)
- Offensive coordinator: Charley Molnar (1st season)
- Defensive coordinator: Chuck Reisland (1st season)
- Home stadium: Dix Stadium

1994 Mid-American Conference football standings
	Conf.					Overall
Team	W		L		T	W		L		T
Central Michigan $	8	–	1	–	0	9	–	3	–	0
Bowling Green	7	–	1	–	0	9	–	2	–	0
Western Michigan	5	–	3	–	0	7	–	4	–	0
Miami (OH)	5	–	3	–	0	5	–	5	–	1
Ball State	5	–	3	–	1	5	–	5	–	1
Toledo	4	–	3	–	1	6	–	4	–	1
Eastern Michigan	5	–	4	–	0	5	–	6	–	0
Kent State	2	–	7	–	0	2	–	9	–	0
Akron	1	–	8	–	0	1	–	10	–	0
Ohio	0	–	9	–	0	0	–	11	–	0
$ – Conference champion

The 1994 Kent State Golden Flashes football team was an American football team that represented Kent State University in the Mid-American Conference (MAC) during the 1994 NCAA Division I-A football season. In their first season under head coach Jim Corrigall, the Golden Flashes compiled a 2–9 record (2–7 against MAC opponents), finished in eighth place in the MAC, and were outscored by all opponents by a combined total of 293 to 140.

The team's statistical leaders included Astron Whatley with 1,003 rushing yards, Mike Challenger with 842 passing yards, and Chris Amill with 247 receiving yards.

== Schedule ==
Date	Opponent	Site	Result	Attendance
September 3	at Rutgers*	Rutgers Stadium; Piscataway, NJ	L 6–28	33,279
September 17	Akron	Dix Stadium; Kent, OH (Wagon Wheel)	W 32–16	
September 24	at Central Michigan	Kelly/Shorts Stadium; Mount Pleasant, MI	L 0–45	
October 1	at Western Michigan	Waldo Stadium; Kalamazoo, MI	L 10–24	
October 8	Eastern Michigan	Dix Stadium; Kent, OH	L 10–24	
October 15	at No. 3 Youngstown State*	Stambaugh Stadium; Youngstown, OH	L 14–28	
October 22	Ohio	Dix Stadium; Kent, OH	W 24–0	
October 29	at Toledo	Glass Bowl; Toledo, OH	L 14–48	
November 5	Bowling Green	Dix Stadium; Kent, OH (Anniversary Award)	L 16–22	
November 12	at Miami (OH)	Yager Stadium; Oxford, OH	L 14–24	
November 19	Ball State	Dix Stadium; Kent, OH	L 0–34	
*Non-conference game; Rankings from The Sports Network Poll released prior to the game
