= 1994 Ball State Cardinals football team =

American college football season

1994 Ball State Cardinals football
- Conference: Mid-American Conference
- Record: 5–5–1 (5–3–1 MAC)
- Head coach: Paul Schudel (10th season)
- Offensive coordinator: Dan Roushar (1st season)
- Defensive coordinator: Tim Burke (3rd season)
- Home stadium: Ball State Stadium

1994 Mid-American Conference football standings
	Conf.					Overall
Team	W		L		T	W		L		T
Central Michigan $	8	–	1	–	0	9	–	3	–	0
Bowling Green	7	–	1	–	0	9	–	2	–	0
Western Michigan	5	–	3	–	0	7	–	4	–	0
Miami (OH)	5	–	3	–	0	5	–	5	–	1
Ball State	5	–	3	–	1	5	–	5	–	1
Toledo	4	–	3	–	1	6	–	4	–	1
Eastern Michigan	5	–	4	–	0	5	–	6	–	0
Kent State	2	–	7	–	0	2	–	9	–	0
Akron	1	–	8	–	0	1	–	10	–	0
Ohio	0	–	9	–	0	0	–	11	–	0
$ – Conference champion

The 1994 Ball State Cardinals football team was an American football team that represented Ball State University in the Mid-American Conference (MAC) during the 1994 NCAA Division I-A football season. In its 10th and final season under head coach Paul Schudel, the team compiled a 5–5–1 record (5–3–1 against conference opponents) and finished in fifth place out of ten teams in the MAC. The team played its home games at Ball State Stadium in Muncie, Indiana.

The team's statistical leaders included Brent Baldwin with 1,342 passing yards, Tony Nibbs with 1,210 rushing yards, Juan Gorman with 662 receiving yards, and Michael Blair each with 78 points scored.

== Schedule ==
Date	Opponent	Site	Result	Attendance	Source
September 3	at West Virginia*	Mountaineer Field; Morgantown, WV	L 14–16	50,063	
September 17	at Purdue*	Ross–Ade Stadium; West Lafayette, IN	L 21–49	45,772	
September 24	Ohio	Ball State Stadium; Muncie, IN	W 21–14		
October 1	Central Michigan	Ball State Stadium; Muncie, IN	W 31–28		
October 8	at Toledo	Glass Bowl; Toledo, OH	T 24–24		
October 15	Western Michigan	Ball State Stadium; Muncie, IN	W 16–13		
October 22	at Bowling Green	Doyt Perry Stadium; Bowling Green, OH	L 36–59		
October 29	Eastern Michigan	Ball State Stadium; Muncie, IN	L 20–41		
November 5	at Miami (OH)	Yager Stadium; Oxford, OH	L 21–24		
November 12	Akron	Ball State Stadium; Muncie, IN	W 38–28		
November 19	at Kent State	Dix Stadium; Kent, OH	W 34–0		
*Non-conference game
