= Dante Love =

American football player (born 1986)

No. 86
- Position: Wide receiver

Personal information
- Born: March 19, 1986 (age 40); Cincinnati, Ohio, U.S.
- Listed height: 5 ft 10 in (1.78 m)
- Listed weight: 179 lb (81 kg)

Career information
- High school: Withrow High School
- College: Ball State (2005–2009)

Awards and highlights
- Stats at ESPN

Dante Love is an American former college football player. He played as a wide receiver for the Ball State Cardinals at Ball State University until he suffered a cervical fracture during a 2008 season game. At the time of his career-ending injury, Love was the 2008 season's national leader in receiving yards, and he ranked as Ball State's career kick return yards leader and second-leading receiver in terms of yards and number of receptions.

== Early life ==
He was born in Cincinnati, Ohio to Maxine Love on March 19, 1986. Love attended Withrow High School, where he played football as a quarterback during his last two school years. As a senior in 2004, the team posted a 10–1 record and secured the Southwest Ohio Public League championship. That season, Love threw for 2,094 yards and 20 touchdowns and rushed for 970 yards and 14 touchdowns. He was subsequently named an All-City and All-Southwest Ohio District player, Ohio North-South and Ohio East-West All-Star, and the Withrow High School most valuable player. Love was also named the City Offensive Player of the Year and The Cincinnati Enquirer Division III Player of the Year.

== College career ==
In 2005, Love enrolled at Ball State University in Muncie, Indiana and played as a true freshman wide receiver on the football team. That season, he saw action in all eleven games and recorded 19 receptions for 185 yards and three touchdowns. He also made 19 carries for 89 rushing yards. On special teams, Love returned 22 kick-offs for 545 yards, which included a 94-yard return for a touchdown against Ohio. He led the team in all-purpose yardage with 74.7 yards per game. At the end of the season, he was named co-recipient of the John Hodge Award for the team's most outstanding freshman player.

In 2006, Love played in all twelve games, to include seven starts. He recorded 52 receptions for 735 yards and four touchdowns. Love also made 19 carries for 83 yards and one touchdown and returned 13 kicks for 216 yards. He ranked second on the team in terms of all-purpose yardage with 86.2 yards per game.

In 2007, he saw action in all 13 games and started in 11. He recorded 100 receptions for 1,398 yards and ten touchdowns. He returned 49 kick-offs for 1,100 yards, to include a 100-yard touchdown return against Central Michigan. Love broke the Mid-American Conference (MAC) single-season records for both all-purpose yards with 2,690 and kick-off return yards with 1,100.

Going into the 2008 season, Love had recorded 2,318 receiving yards in three years to become the second leading Ball State receiver behind only Dante Ridgeway. He was also the leading Ball State kick return specialist with 1,862 yards. Love had played in all 36 games during his career and made at least one reception in 35 of them.

In 2008, Love played in each of the first four games. In the season opener against Northeastern, he made nine receptions for 171 yards and one touchdown and rushed for 22 yards and another touchdown. Against Navy, he again had nine receptions for 165 yards and two touchdowns. He made six carries for 37 yards and one rushing touchdown. Against Akron, he caught seven reception for 97 yards.

=== Injury ===
On Saturday, September 20, for their fourth game, the Cardinals traveled to Bloomington to face the Indiana Hoosiers. At that point, Love led the nation with 144.3 receiving yards per game. Love made two catches for 25 yards in the first half. With 10:45 left in the second quarter, quarterback Nate Davis threw a short 2-yard pass to the right for Love on a swing route. He made the reception and ran to the outside and along the sideline. An Indiana linebacker grabbed onto Love's shoulder pads from behind, which caused him to lower his head as he pushed forward for more yards. An Indiana cornerback, Chris Adkins, made the tackle from the front and Love fell to the ground with the ball being knocked loose. Hoosiers safety Nick Polk recovered the fumble and returned it for a touchdown. Love remained on the ground for several minutes and reported that his legs were numb. He had suffered a cervical fracture of his spine. After about fifteen minutes, he was placed on a spineboard and taken to the locker room by a motorized cart. Love was then transported by ambulance to Ball Memorial Hospital and then by helicopter to Methodist Hospital of Indianapolis. Doctors showed Love x-rays of his fractured neck and informed him that he may eventually walk again, but would never be able to play football. That night, doctors performed a five-hour surgical procedure to stabilize his spine. After the surgery, Love was able to move his arms and legs.

Ball State went on to win the game against Indiana for the school's first-ever victory over a Bowl Championship Series (BCS) conference school. Head coach Brady Hoke called it the biggest win in school history during a greatly abbreviated post-game press conference. Hoke cut it short in order to visit Love in the hospital.

While unable to play, Love regained the use of his limbs, and on October 25, he returned to assist the team's coaches during the 2008 season. After the season, Hoke resigned as head coach to take the same position at San Diego State and was replaced by offensive coordinator Stan Parrish. Parrish said that he would hire Love as a graduate assistant for the 2009 season as he works towards his undergraduate degree.
