= Darius Hill =

American football player (born 1985)

Profile
- Position: Tight end

Personal information
- Born: August 26, 1985 (age 41); St. Charles, Missouri, U.S.
- Listed height: 6 ft 7 in (2.01 m)
- Listed weight: 245 lb (111 kg)

Career information
- College: Ball State
- NFL draft: 2009: undrafted

Career history
- Cincinnati Bengals (2009); Jacksonville Jaguars (2010)*
- * Offseason or practice squad member only

Awards and highlights
- 2× First-team All-MAC (2007–2008)
- Stats at Pro Football Reference

Darius E. Hill (born August 26, 1985) is an American former football tight end. He was signed by the Cincinnati Bengals as an undrafted free agent in 2009. He played college football at Ball State University.

== College career ==
After a year as a red-shirt freshman in 2004, Hill appeared in 11 games as a back-up tight end in 2005. Though he caught just 11 passes, 3 were touchdowns, including a game-tying grab in triple overtime of a 60-57 win over Western Michigan in week five.

In his second year, Hill saw much more action. He caught at least one pass in 10 of the Cardinals' 12 games, recorded four 100+ yard games and four multiple touchdown games, and lead the team with 741 yards and a school record 10 touchdowns. He also finished second on the team with 42 catches and an average of 17.6 yards per reception. These totals ranked him 7th, tied for 1st, 15th, and 5th in the MAC for 2006, and earned him an All-Conference Honorable Mention.

In 2007, Hill caught at least two passes in all 13 of Ball State's games, helping them reach their first winning record and bowl game since 1996. He broke his own single-season school record with a team-and-conference-leading 11 touchdowns, in addition to 65 receptions for 926 yards (second in both categories to Dante Love on the team, 8th and 9th in the MAC respectively). These totals earned him a spot on the All-Conference first-team, and a John Mackey Award nomination.

As a fifth year senior, Hill played all 14 games for the Cardinals in 2008-9. The team amassed a 12-2 record and ended the season ranked in the top 25 for the first and only time in school history. As in the previous season, Hill recorded no 100+ yard games, but did end the year with 40 receptions for 670 yards (second on the team to Briggs Orsborn in both categories) and seven touchdowns (leading the team for the third consecutive year). Despite the decreased output, he was again voted onto the All-Conference first-team.

Hill ended his career at Ball State with 158 receptions for 2,473 yards, which was third most by any player in both categories at the time (8th and 6th as of 2016). His mark of 31 career receiving touchdowns remains a school record, as does his total of seven multi-touchdown games.

== Professional career ==
=== Cincinnati Bengals ===
Hill was signed by the Cincinnati Bengals as an undrafted free agent following the 2009 NFL draft. He played in one game in 2009, and was waived on September 4, 2010 during final cuts.

=== Jacksonville Jaguars ===
In 2010, he was signed to the Jacksonville Jaguars' practice squad.
