= Michael Blair =

American football player (born 1974)

No. 45, 27, 32
- Position: Running back

Personal information
- Born: November 26, 1974 (age 51); Chicago, Illinois, U.S.
- Listed height: 5 ft 11 in (1.80 m)
- Listed weight: 245 lb (111 kg)

Career information
- High school: Thornwood (South Holland, Illinois)
- College: Ball State
- NFL draft: 1997: undrafted
- Expansion draft: 1999: 1st round, 25th overall pick

Career history
- Kansas City Chiefs (1997)*; Cincinnati Bengals (1998); Green Bay Packers (1998); Cleveland Browns (1999)*; New Orleans Saints (2000)*; Frankfurt Galaxy (2000); New York/New Jersey Hitmen (2001); Carolina Cobras (2002)*; Grand Rapids Rampage (2002); Carolina Cobras (2003); New Orleans VooDoo (2004); Grand Rapids Rampage (2004-2005); New York Dragons (2006)
- * Offseason or practice squad member only

Awards and highlights
- MAC Freshman of the Year (1993); Second-team All-MAC (1996)

Career NFL statistics
- Rushing yards: 7
- Rushing average: 2.3
- Receptions: 3
- Receiving yards: 20
- Stats at Pro Football Reference

Career AFL statistics
- Rushing yards: 157
- Rushing touchdowns: 6
- Receptions: 7
- Receiving yards: 85
- Receiving touchdowns: 1
- Stats at ArenaFan.com

Michaelangelo Christopher Blair (born November 23, 1974) is an American former professional football player who was a running back in the National Football League (NFL) for the Cincinnati Bengals and Green Bay Packers in 1998. He played college football for the Ball State Cardinals. His Bengals career totaled three games, and he played 11 games for the Packers. Finishing his NFL career with 3 rushing attempts for 7 yards, and 3 catches for 20 yards. In 2001, he played for the New York/New Jersey Hitmen in the XFL. He also played for the Carolina Cobras in the Arena Football League.

Blair attended Ball State University, where he played on the 1996 Cardinals Las Vegas Bowl team.

In 2006 Blair played a football player in We Are Marshall starring Matthew McConaughey and The Game Plan starring Dwayne "Rock" Johnson. In 2007, he became a TJ or Travel Journalist for 5 Takes:Latin America on the Travel Channel.
