= Sean Baker (American football) =

American football player and coach (born 1988)

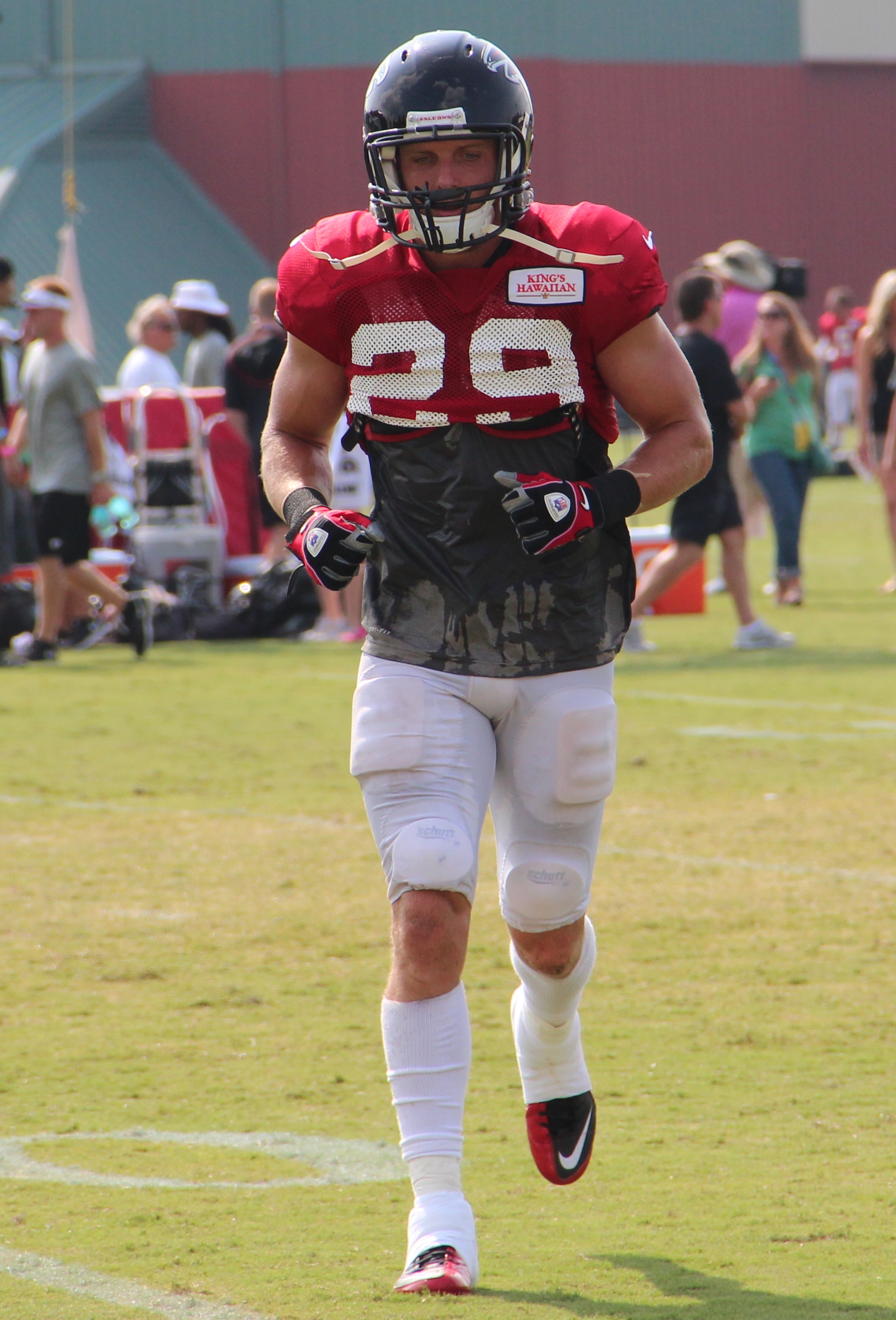
- Baker with the Atlanta Falcons in 2014

Houston Texans
- Title: Defensive assistant

Personal information
- Born: November 6, 1988 (age 38); Youngstown, Ohio, U.S.
- Listed height: 5 ft 11 in (1.80 m)
- Listed weight: 209 lb (95 kg)

Career information
- Position: Safety (No. 29)
- High school: Canfield (OH)
- College: Ball State
- NFL draft: 2012: undrafted

Career history

Playing
- Tampa Bay Buccaneers (2012–2013)*; Atlanta Falcons (2013–2014); Indianapolis Colts (2015)*; Cleveland Browns (2015–2016)*
- * Offseason or practice squad member only

Coaching
- Youngstown State (2017) Defensive quality control assistant; Youngstown State (2018) Linebackers coach; Youngstown State (2019–2020) Special teams coordinator & outside linebackers coach; Houston Texans (2021–2023) Assistant special teams coach; Houston Texans (2024–present) Defensive & special teams assistant

Awards and highlights
- MAC Freshman of the Year (2008); First-team All-MAC (2011); FWAA, TSN, Rivals.com Freshman All-American (2008)
- Stats at Pro Football Reference

Sean Joseph Baker (born November 6, 1988) is an American former professional football player who was a safety in the National Football League (NFL). He played college football for the Ball State Cardinals. He signed with the Tampa Bay Buccaneers in 2012 as an undrafted free agent, and was also a member of the Atlanta Falcons and Indianapolis Colts.

== Early life ==
Attending Canfield High School, Baker helped team to an 8-3 overall record as a senior and a 29-8 mark in his career. He tallied 90 tackles and two interceptions.

Considered only a two-star recruit by Rivals.com, Baker was not ranked among the nation's top defensive backs. He committed to Ball State on December 27, 2006, picking the Cardinals over Eastern Michigan and Kent State.

== College career ==
After redshirting his first year at Ball State, Baker played in all 14 games in 2008 and started the final 10 to earn his first letter. He led the Cardinals with 91 tackles and tied for the Mid-American Conference lead with six interceptions, including one he returned for a touchdown against Indiana, and had 10 pass breakups.

Baker subsequently earned multiple All-Freshman honors, as he was named to FWAA′s Freshman All-America team, Sporting News′ Freshman All-American team, and Rivals.com′s Freshman All-America team.

== Professional career ==
Pre-draft measurables
Height	Weight	40-yard dash	10-yard split	20-yard split	20-yard shuttle	Three-cone drill	Vertical jump	Broad jump	Bench press
5 ft 11 3/8 in (1.81 m)	210 lb (95 kg)	4.65 s	1.62 s	2.68 s	4.24 s	6.85 s	33.5 in (0.85 m)	9 ft 6 in (2.90 m)	24 reps
All values from Pro Day

=== Tampa Bay Buccaneers ===
Baker entered the 2012 NFL draft, but was not selected. He signed with the Tampa Bay Buccaneers following the draft, on May 7, 2012. In his fourth NFL preseason game, Baker made two interceptions and a fumble recovery. Despite his performance in the game, Baker was released by the Buccaneers on August 31. On November 27, 2012, Baker was signed to the Buccaneers practice squad.

=== Atlanta Falcons ===
On October 22, 2013, Baker was signed to Atlanta Falcons practice squad. After being cut by the Falcons on August 30, 2014, he was re-signed to the regular season and promoted to the active roster. Baker played in five games for the Falcons in 2014 and was credited for two tackles. On September 4, 2015, he was cut by the Falcons.

=== Indianapolis Colts ===
On October 29, 2015, the Indianapolis Colts signed Baker to their practice squad. He was released on October 31.

=== Cleveland Browns ===
On January 5, 2016, Baker signed a reserve/futures contract with the Cleveland Browns. His contract was for 1-year and $525,000. On August 29, 2016, Baker was waived by the Browns.

== Coaching career ==
Baker was hired by Youngstown State as a defensive quality control coach in 2017. He was promoted to special teams coordinator and outside linebackers coach by 2020.

Baker was hired by the Houston Texans as their assistant special teams coordinator on March 10, 2021. In 2024, he became a defensive assistant.
