= Shafer Suggs =

American gridiron football player (born 1953)

No. 23
- Position: Safety

Personal information
- Born: April 28, 1953 (age 73); Elkhart, Indiana, U.S.
- Listed height: 6 ft 1 in (1.85 m)
- Listed weight: 200 lb (91 kg)

Career information
- High school: Elkhart
- College: Ball State
- NFL draft: 1976: 2nd round, 33rd overall pick

Career history
- New York Jets (1976–1980); Cincinnati Bengals (1980); Montreal Alouettes (1981); New Jersey Generals (1983)

Awards and highlights
- Second-team All-American (1975); MAC Defensive Player of the Year (1975)

Career NFL statistics
- Interceptions: 7
- Fumble recoveries: 4
- Defensive TDs: 1
- Stats at Pro Football Reference

Shafer Suggs (born April 28, 1953) is an American former professional football player who was a safety in the National Football League (NFL). He played college football for the Ball State Cardinals before being selected by the New York Jets in the second round of the 1976 NFL draft.

Suggs also played for the Cincinnati Bengals, Montreal Alouettes, and New Jersey Generals.

== Early life ==
Suggs played high school football at Elkhart High School. While there he was an All-State defensive back. Aside from football, Suggs lettered in basketball and track.

== College career ==
Suggs played college football at Ball State University. While there he set the school record for interceptions in a season with 8 in 1975 and career interceptions with 14. As a senior, he was the Mid-American Conference defensive player of the year and was an AP second team All-American. Suggs was also a three-year starter on the basketball team.

== Professional career ==
=== New York Jets ===
Suggs was drafted by the New York Jets in the second round of the 1976 NFL draft. As a rookie in 1976 Suggs started 10 games at cornerback, recording one interception. During his second year he moved to strong safety, where he started eight of nine games. He missed seven games due to a shoulder separation he suffered in car accident on his way to training camp. In 1978 Suggs returned from injuries to start all 16 games at strong safety for the Jets, leading the team in tackles. In 1979 Suggs started 15 of 16 games at strong safety, recording three interceptions. During the season, he scored his first and only NFL touchdown, returning an interception 32 yards, in a Monday Night Football game against the Minnesota Vikings. In 1980 Suggs started four games for the Jets before suffering an injury.

=== Cincinnati Bengals ===
Suggs was traded to the Cincinnati Bengals during the 1980 season. Suggs played the final four games for the Bengals with no starts.

=== Montreal Alouettes and New Jersey Generals ===
Suggs played for the Montreal Alouettes of the Canadian Football League in 1981 and the New Jersey Generals of the United States Football League in 1983.
