= MiQuale Lewis =

American football player (born 1987)

Profile
- Position: Running back

Personal information
- Born: June 8, 1987 (age 39); Fort Wayne, Indiana, U.S.
- Listed height: 5 ft 6 in (1.68 m)
- Listed weight: 184 lb (83 kg)

Career information
- High school: R. Nelson Snider High School
- College: Ball State

Awards and highlights
- 1st Team All-Mid-American Conference (2008); 2nd Team All-Mid-American Conference (2009); Doak Walker Award Watch List (2009); Walter Camp Award Watch List (2009)

MiQuale Maurice Lewis (born June 8, 1987) is an American former college football running back at Ball State University Cardinals. As a junior, Lewis rushed for 1,701 yards and scored 22 touchdowns to help Ball State accumulate a 12–2 record and earn a berth in the 2009 GMAC Bowl.

== College career ==
Lewis ran for 3,748 yards while a member of the Ball State Cardinals football team.

== See also ==
- List of college football yearly rushing leaders
