= Anthony Winbush =

American football player (born 1994)

Profile
- Position: Defensive end

Personal information
- Born: December 18, 1994 (age 31); Indianapolis, Indiana
- Listed height: 6 ft 1 in (1.85 m)
- Listed weight: 249 lb (113 kg)

Career information
- High school: Warren Central (Indianapolis, Indiana)
- College: Ball State
- NFL draft: 2018: undrafted

Career history
- Atlanta Falcons (2018)*; Indianapolis Colts (2018)*
- * Offseason or practice squad member only

Awards and highlights
- First-team All-MAC (2017)
- Stats at Pro Football Reference

Anthony Winbush (born December 18, 1994) is an American former football defensive end. He played college football at Ball State.

== Professional career ==
=== Atlanta Falcons ===
Winbush signed with the Atlanta Falcons as an undrafted free agent on May 1, 2018. He was waived on September 1, 2018.

=== Indianapolis Colts ===
On November 13, 2018, Winbush was signed to the Indianapolis Colts practice squad. He spent time on and off the Colts practice squad before being released on January 3, 2019. He was re-signed on January 9, 2019. He signed a reserve/future contract on January 13, 2019. He was waived on May 5, 2019.
