= Jamill Smith =

American football player (born 1991)

No. 4, 15, 84
- Position: Wide receiver

Personal information
- Born: February 23, 1991 (age 35); Muncie, Indiana, U.S.
- Listed height: 5 ft 6 in (1.68 m)
- Listed weight: 155 lb (70 kg)

Career information
- High school: Southside (Muncie)
- College: Ball State (2009–2013)
- NFL draft: 2014: undrafted

Career history
- 2014–2016: Ottawa Redblacks
- 2017: Georgia Firebirds
- 2017–2018: Edmonton Eskimos
- 2019: Montreal Alouettes
- 2019: Edmonton Eskimos

Awards and highlights
- Grey Cup champion (2016); First-team All-MAC (2012); 2× Second-team All-MAC (2011, 2013)
- Stats at CFL.ca

Jamill Amin Smith (born February 23, 1991) is an American former professional football wide receiver who played in the Canadian Football League (CFL). He played college football at Ball State.

== Early life ==
Smith played high school football for the Southside High School Rebels of Muncie, Indiana, earning four letters. He helped team to an 8–4 record and was named all-state his senior year. He also helped the team advance to the sectional finals as a junior and senior. Smith earned All-Olympic Athletic Conference honors his junior and senior seasons. He passed for 2,459 yards and 20 touchdowns while rushing for 1,724 yards and 28 touchdowns as a senior. He set school records for most passing yards in a game, season and career. He also set the school record for most career touchdowns in rushing and passing. Smith played baseball for the Rebels, recording a .429 batting average his senior year.

== College career ==
Smith played for the Ball State Cardinals of Ball State University from 2010 to 2013. He was redshirted in 2009. In 2011, Smith garnered All-Mid-American Conference (MAC) Second Team accolades. In 2012, he earned All-MAC First Team honors as a wide receiver as well as All-MAC Third Team recognition as a punt and kick returner. In 2013, he garnered All-MAC Second Team honors as a kick returner and All-MAC Third Team recognition as a wide receiver and punt returner. Smith accumulated career totals of 1,988 kickoff return yards, 173 receptions and seventeen receiving touchdowns.

== Professional career ==
Smith was signed by the Ottawa Redblacks of the Canadian Football League (CFL) on May 29, 2014. He was released by the Redblacks on June 19, 2015. He was signed to the Redblacks' practice roster on October 20 and promoted to the team's active roster on October 23, 2015.

Smith signed with the Georgia Firebirds of the National Arena League (NAL) on June 1, 2017. He played in 3 games for the Firebirds in 2017, catching 8 passes for 70 yards and 1 touchdown. He also returned 2 kicks for 54 yards.

He signed with the Edmonton Eskimos on August 20, 2017. Over two seasons he appeared in 9 games, primarily used as a punt and kick returner.

He signed with the Montreal Alouettes on September 24, 2019.
