= Keith Wenning =

American football player (born 1991)

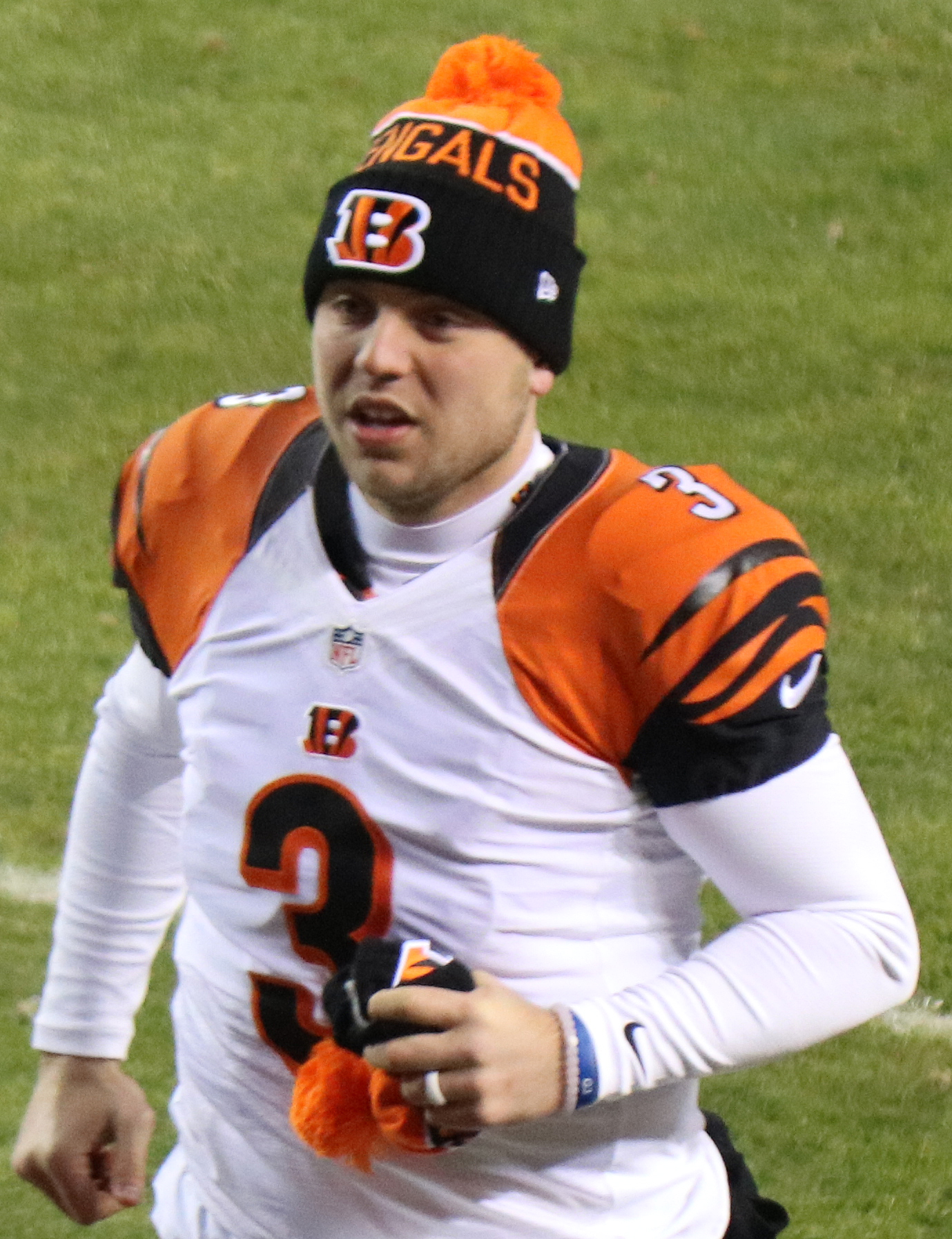
- Wenning with the Cincinnati Bengals in 2015

No. 10, 3, 19
- Position: Quarterback

Personal information
- Born: February 14, 1991 (age 35); Coldwater, Ohio, U.S.
- Listed height: 6 ft 3 in (1.91 m)
- Listed weight: 225 lb (102 kg)

Career information
- High school: Coldwater (OH)
- College: Ball State
- NFL draft: 2014: 6th round, 194th overall pick

Career history
- Baltimore Ravens (2014–2015)*; Cincinnati Bengals (2015); New York Giants (2016–2017)*; Buffalo Bills (2017)*; Toronto Argonauts (2017)*
- * Offseason or practice squad member only

Awards and highlights
- 2× Second-team All-MAC (2012, 2013)
- Stats at Pro Football Reference

Keith Wenning (born February 14, 1991) is an American former professional football quarterback. He was selected by the Baltimore Ravens in the sixth round of the 2014 NFL draft. He played college football at Ball State.

== Early life ==
Wenning lettered in baseball, basketball and football at Coldwater High School. His senior year, he set the Coldwater High School single-season records for most passing yards in a season (3,699) and most touchdown passes in a season (40). Wenning was named Ohio Division V Offensive Player of the Year as a senior. The Coldwater Cavaliers finished as runners-up in the Ohio state championship in Wenning's senior year. In that game, Wenning set the Ohio state championship game records for completed passes (40) and passing yards (414).

== College career ==
=== 2010 season ===
Wenning played in all 12 games and started in the final 10 games of his freshman year under then head coach Stan Parrish. His first collegiate start came on September 18 against Purdue; the Cardinals would lose 24–13. This game was followed by another Big Ten matchup against #18 ranked Iowa. The Cardinals would finish the 2010 season at 4–8, leading to the dismissal of head coach Stan Parrish.

=== 2011 season ===
Ball State's season opener under new head coach Pete Lembo was an in-state cross conference match versus the Big Ten's Indiana University at Lucas Oil Stadium in Indianapolis on September 3. Wenning threw for 173 yards, 2 touchdowns and ran in a 1-yard quarterback keeper to upset Indiana 27–20. Ball State would finish the season 6–6 with another win over Army 48–21 and two notable losses to #22 ranked South Florida and #2 ranked Oklahoma. Wenning would finish the season with 2,786 yards passing and 19 touchdown passes.

=== 2012 season ===
Wenning lead the Ball State Cardinals to a 9–3 season with important wins over #25 Toledo 34–27, the then Big East's South Florida 31–27 and for a second year in a row the Big Ten's Indiana University 41–39. The three regular season losses came to # 12 ranked Clemson, Kent State and Northern Illinois. Both Kent State and Northern Illinois would go on to be ranked in the top 25. Clemson's quarterback Tajh Boyd would go on to be the 213th pick in the 2014 NFL Draft. Wenning led Ball State to the Beef 'O' Brady's Bowl game in St. Petersburg Florida where they were ultimately defeated by the University of Central Florida 38–17. UCF's then sophomore quarterback Blake Bortles would go on to be the 3rd pick in the 2014 NFL Draft. Wenning would finish the season with 3095 yards passing and 24 touchdown passes.

=== 2013 season ===
Wenning led the Ball State Cardinals to another successful season, finishing 10–3 after the loss to Arkansas State in the GoDaddy Bowl on January 5, 2014. Wenning under head coach Pete Lembo helped the Ball State Cardinals become bowl eligible for the third consecutive year. Wenning's favorite target in 2013 is the wide receiver Willie Snead IV who has racked up 1516 receiving yards and 15 touchdowns.

In the Cardinals 48–24 win over Akron, Wenning crossed the 10,000 yard career passing mark to make the List of NCAA Division I FBS quarterbacks with at least 10,000 career passing yards.

Wenning currently holds Ball State's records for most career passing yards, most pass attempts, most pass completions and most career passing touchdowns.

After the six touchdown passes thrown during Ball State's 55–14 win over Miami, Wenning's career passing touchdowns total hit 91.

Wenning added a 215 yards passing and a touchdown to his totals in the 20–23 loss to Arkansas State in the GoDaddy Bowl. Wenning set a new BSU record with 92 career passing TD's. With the 215 passing yards in the GoDaddy Bowl Wenning's season total hit 4,148 passing yards. Wenning now has the third-most single season passing yards in Mid-American Conference history falling just behind Byron Leftwich of Marshall (4,268 in 2002) and Ben Roethlisberger from Miami (4,486 in 2003).

Wenning accepted an invitation to play in the East-West Shrine Game on January 18, 2014. He played on the west team along with two other quarterbacks Notre Dame's Tommy Rees and Washington's Keith Price.

=== College statistics ===
Season	Passing						Rushing		
Season	Cmp	Att	Yds	TD	Int	Rtg	Att	Yds	TD
2010	128	235	1,373	14	14	111.3	32	−3	2
2011	287	449	2,786	19	11	125.1	57	182	3
2012	301	460	3,095	24	10	134.8	56	105	3
2013	319	498	4,148	35	7	154.4	35	47	5
Career	1,035	1,642	11,402	92	42	131.7	177	323	13

=== College awards ===
- On the list of NCAA Division I FBS quarterbacks with at least 10,000 career passing yards
- First player in Ball State history to pass for over 10,000 yards with 11,402 yards passing (2013)
- One of only 33 NCAA Division I FBS quarterbacks with at least 90 career passing touchdowns
- Holds Ball State's career passing touchdown record with 92 (2013)
- Holds both of Ball State's career passing attempts and completions records (2013)
- Holds Ball State's single-season passing touchdown record with 35 (2013)
- 2010 Ball State's 2010 John Hodge Award Winner (Most Valuable Freshman)
- 2011 Academic All-MAC Honorable Mention
- 2012 All-MAC Second-team Offense
- 2012 Ball State John Magnabosco Most Valuable Offensive Player Award
- 2013 Maxwell Award Watch List
- 2013 Johnny Unitas Golden Arm Award Watch List
- 2013 Davey O'Brien Award Watch List
- 2013 All-MAC Second-team Offense

== Professional career ==
=== Baltimore Ravens ===
Wenning was selected 194th overall in the sixth round of the 2014 NFL draft by the Baltimore Ravens. His first NFL snap came against the San Francisco 49ers in Baltimore's first preseason game on August 7, 2014, and his first NFL pass completion was a 10-yard pass to undrafted rookie wide receiver Jeremy Butler for a first down against the Dallas Cowboys in the second preseason game on August 16. He completed 8 of 13 passes for 117 yards in the final preseason game against the New Orleans Saints. Wenning was released by the Ravens on August 30 and was re-signed to the team's practice squad the following day.

Wenning was released by the team on May 12, 2015.

=== Cincinnati Bengals ===
On June 24, 2015, Wenning was signed by the Cincinnati Bengals. On September 5, Wenning was waived by the Bengals. The following day, he was re-signed to the Bengals' practice squad. On December 16, 2015, Wenning was signed to the active roster after starting quarterback Andy Dalton suffered a fractured thumb in a game against the Pittsburgh Steelers. He served as A. J. McCarron's backup for the rest of the season, including a playoff game, but he never played. On September 3, 2016, Wenning was waived by the Bengals.

=== New York Giants ===
On December 27, 2016, Wenning was signed to the New York Giants' practice squad. He signed a reserve/future contract with the Giants on January 9, 2017, which was the day after the Giants' last playoff game. Wenning was waived by the Giants on May 1, a few days after the Giants picked University of California quarterback Davis Webb in the 2017 NFL draft and several weeks after the team signed veteran free agent Geno Smith.

=== Buffalo Bills ===
On August 28, 2017, Wenning signed with the Buffalo Bills. He played in the Bills' final preseason game on August 31, going 5-of-15 for 41 yards and no touchdowns or interceptions in a 27-17 victory over the Detroit Lions. Wenning was waived two days later on September 2.

=== Toronto Argonauts ===
On October 3, 2017, Wenning signed a practice roster agreement with the Toronto Argonauts of the Canadian Football League. He was released by the Argonauts on October 20.
