= Brad Saar =

American football player (born 1963)

No. 59
- Position: Linebacker

Personal information
- Born: February 24, 1963 (age 63); Buffalo, New York, U.S.
- Listed height: 6 ft 1 in (1.85 m)
- Listed weight: 220 lb (100 kg)

Career information
- High school: Adlai E. Stevenson
- College: Ball State
- NFL draft: 1986: undrafted

Career history
- Indianapolis Colts (1986–1987)
- Stats at Pro Football Reference

Bradford Louis Saar (born February 24, 1963) is an American former professional football player who was a linebacker for the Indianapolis Colts of the National Football League (NFL) in 1987. He played college football for the Ball State Cardinals.
