= Keith McKenzie (American football) =

American football player and coach (born 1973)

Ball State Cardinals
- Title: Defensive line coach

Personal information
- Born: October 17, 1973 (age 53); Detroit, Michigan, U.S.
- Listed height: 6 ft 3 in (1.91 m)
- Listed weight: 267 lb (121 kg)

Career information
- Position: Defensive end (No. 95, 90, 73, 91)
- High school: Highland Park Community (Highland Park, Michigan)
- College: Ball State
- NFL draft: 1996: 7th round, 252nd overall pick

Career history

Playing
- Green Bay Packers (1996–1999); Cleveland Browns (2000–2001); Chicago Bears (2002); Green Bay Packers (2002); Buffalo Bills (2003)

Coaching
- Wayne State (2008–2015) Assistant linebackers & defensive line coach; Ball State (2016–present) Linebackers coach

Awards and highlights
- Super Bowl champion (XXXI)

Career NFL statistics
- Tackles: 157
- Sacks: 29.5
- Fumble recoveries: 9
- Stats at Pro Football Reference

Keith Derrick McKenzie (born October 17, 1973) is an American former professional football player who was a linebacker and defensive end for eight seasons with four teams in the National Football League (NFL). He played college football for the Ball State Cardinals and was selected by the Green Bay Packers in the seventh round of the 1996 NFL draft with the 252nd overall pick.

He is the nephew of Buffalo Bills legend Reggie McKenzie.
