= Jahwan Edwards =

American football player (born 1992)

Profile
- Position: Running back

Personal information
- Born: July 27, 1992 (age 34); Matthews, North Carolina, U.S.
- Listed height: 5 ft 9 in (1.75 m)
- Listed weight: 215 lb (98 kg)

Career information
- High school: David W. Butler (Matthews, North Carolina)
- College: Ball State (2011–2014)
- NFL draft: 2015: undrafted

Career history
- San Diego Chargers (2015)*; Atlanta Falcons (2015)*; Jacksonville Jaguars (2015)*; Miami Dolphins (2015–2016)*; Cleveland Browns (2016)*
- * Offseason or practice squad member only

Awards and highlights
- Ball State career rushing touchdowns record (51); Ball State career rushing yards record (4,558)
- Stats at Pro Football Reference

Jahwan Edwards (born July 27, 1992) is an American former professional football running back. He played college football at Ball State. He is Ball State's all-time leader in career rushing yards with 4,558 yards and rushing touchdowns with 51.

== Early life ==
Edwards lettered all four years in high school, helping his football team to a 56–3 record during his time at David W. Butler High School in Matthews, North Carolina. The Bulldogs won back-to-back North Carolina 4AA state championships in his junior and senior years and Edwards was named Most Valuable Player in both state championship games. He rushed for a total of 2,979 yards with 30 receptions for 463 yards and 62 touchdowns in his high school career.

== College career ==
Ball State's 2011 season opener under new head coach Pete Lembo was an in-state cross conference match versus the Big Ten's Indiana University at Lucas Oil Stadium in Indianapolis on September 3. Edwards carried the ball 16 time for 84 yards and made his first career pass reception vs. the Hoosiers. Ball State went on to upset Indiana 27–20. Edwards made his first college touchdown in the loss to nationally ranked (#22) South Florida. One of his many highlights from this season would be the three touchdowns he scored against Army. Edwards lead Ball State in rushing with 786 yards and he finished the season ranked 9th in the MAC with 11 touchdowns scored.

With 1410 yards rushing and 14 touchdowns in 2012, Edwards helped to lead the Ball State Cardinals to a 9–3 season. The Cardinals racked up important wins over #25th ranked Toledo 34–27, the then Big East's South Florida 31-27 and for a second year in a row the Big Ten's Indiana 41–39. The three regular season losses came to # 12 ranked Clemson, Kent State and Northern Illinois. Both Kent State and Northern Illinois would go on to be ranked in the top 25. With the 9–3 record Ball State was selected to play in the Beef 'O' Brady's Bowl game in St. Petersburg Florida where they were ultimately defeated by the University of Central Florida 38–17.

In 2013, for the third year in a row Edwards was the top rusher for the Cardinals 1110 yards. He finished the season ranked 19th in the nation with 14 rushing touchdowns. Edwards gained national attention after he ran for 155 yards and 3 touchdowns in Ball State's 48–27 win over Virginia. Edwards helped lead the Ball State Cardinals to another successful season, finishing 10-3 after the loss to Arkansas State in the GoDaddy Bowl on January 5, 2014. Edwards under head coach Pete Lembo helped the Ball State Cardinals become bowl eligible for the third consecutive year. Edwards added 146 yards rushing and 1 touchdown to his season total in the 20–23 loss to Arkansas State in the GoDaddy Bowl.

Edwards began the 2014 season as the record holder for most rushing touchdowns at Ball State, with 39. He also started the season with 3,306 career rushing yards, only 697 yards away from the Ball State all-time leading rusher record. Edwards became the all-time leading rusher at Ball State during the October 18, victory over Central Michigan, breaking Marcus Merriweather's 4,002 record. By the end of the season Edwards joined the List of NCAA Division I FBS players with at least 50 career rushing touchdowns tied for 26 on the list with 51 touchdowns.

=== College awards ===
- 2014 Doak Walker Award Candidate
- 2013 All-Mid-American Conference Second-team
- 2013 ESPN Helmet Sticker Award vs. Virginia (10/5/13)
- AT&T All-America Player of the Week vs. Virginia (10/5/13)
- 2013 Doak Walker Award Candidate
- 2012 All-Mid-American Conference Third-team
- 2011 Ball State John Hodge Award as the team's Most Outstanding Freshman

== Professional career ==
=== San Diego Chargers ===
On May 12, 2015, Edwards signed with the San Diego Chargers as an undrafted free agent. On August 30, 2015, he was released by the Chargers.

=== Atlanta Falcons ===
On September 8, 2015, Edwards was signed to the Atlanta Falcons' practice squad. On October 27, 2015, Edwards was released by the Falcons.

=== Jacksonville Jaguars ===
On December 9, 2015, Edwards was signed to the Jacksonville Jaguars' practice squad. On December 18, 2015, Edwards was released by the Jaguars.

=== Miami Dolphins ===
On December 21, 2015, Edwards was signed to the Miami Dolphins' practice squad.

=== Cleveland Browns ===
On August 20, 2016, Edwards signed with the Browns. On September 3, 2016, he was released by the Browns.
