= Amos Van Pelt =

Canadian football player

Profile
- Position: Halfback

Personal information
- Born: c. 1948 (age 77–78)
- Died: 12/25/2025; Salt Spring Island, BC
- Listed height: 6 ft 2 in (1.88 m)
- Listed weight: 215 lb (98 kg)

Career information
- College: Ball State

Career history
- 1969–1970: Winnipeg Blue Bombers

Amos Van Pelt (born c. 1948) was a Canadian football player who played for the Ottawa Rough Riders and Winnipeg Blue Bombers. He played college football at Ball State University.
