= Corey Croom =

American football player (born 1971)

No. 26
- Position: Running back

Personal information
- Born: May 22, 1971 (age 55); Sandusky, Ohio, U.S.
- Listed height: 5 ft 11 in (1.80 m)
- Listed weight: 208 lb (94 kg)

Career information
- High school: Sandusky
- College: Ball State
- NFL draft: 1993: undrafted

Career history
- New England Patriots (1993–1995); Philadelphia Eagles (1997)*
- * Offseason or practice squad member only

Career NFL statistics
- Rushing yards: 252
- Rushing average: 3.5
- Receptions: 9
- Receiving yards: 100
- Total touchdowns: 1
- Stats at Pro Football Reference

Corey Vincent Croom (born May 22, 1971) is an American former professional football player who was a running back for three seasons with the New England Patriots of the National Football League (NFL). He played college football for the Ball State Cardinals.

== Early life ==
Croom lettered two seasons in football and three seasons in track and field at Sandusky High School in Sandusky, Ohio. He earned UPI all-state honors his senior year after helping the team win the UPI state championship. He was also named All-Erie Shore Conference, all-district, and Erie Shore Conference Player of the Year.

== College career ==
Croom played football for the Ball State Cardinals. He won the John Magnabosco Award for being the Cardinals' most valuable player in 1992. He was a two-time Mid-American Conference first-team selection. He recorded 2,725 rushing yards and 17 rushing touchdowns in his college career. Croom led NCAA Division I football with 301 rushing attempts in 1992.

== Professional career ==
Croom was signed by the New England Patriots of the NFL on April 30, 1993 after going undrafted in the 1993 NFL draft. He was released by the Patriots on August 30, 1993 and signed to the team's practice squad on August 31, 1993. He appeared in 43 games for the Patriots from 1993 to 1995. He scored one touchdown (December 26, 1993) against the Colts on a 5 yard run. After not carrying the ball all season in 1994, Croom was a surprise starter in the Patriots 20-13 wild card loss against the Browns on January 1, 1995; Croom carried the ball 9 times for 35 yards and caught one pass for 5 yards. He was released by the Patriots on August 25, 1996.

Croom signed with the Philadelphia Eagles on April 4, 1997. However, he was later released.
