= Joey Lynch =

American football player and coach (born 1983)

Current position
- Title: Quarterbacks coach
- Team: Texas A&M
- Conference: SEC

Biographical details
- Born: October 17, 1983 (age 43); Indianapolis, Indiana

Playing career
- 2003–2006: Ball State
- Position: Quarterback

Coaching career (HC unless noted)
- 2007: Saint Joseph's (IN) (OC/QB)
- 2008: Ashland (OC)
- 2009: Ball State (WR)
- 2010: Ball State (WR/RC)
- 2011–2013: Ball State (TE/RC)
- 2014–2018: Ball State (OC/QB)
- 2019: Ball State (AHC/OC/QB)
- 2020: Colorado State (OC/QB)
- 2021: Vanderbilt (PGC/QB)
- 2022–2023: Vanderbilt (OC/QB)
- 2024–2025: Texas A&M (SOA)
- 2026–present: Texas A&M (QB)

Joey Lynch (born October 17, 1983) is an American football coach who is the quarterbacks coach for Texas A&M. He was previously the offensive coordinator and quarterbacks coach at Vanderbilt University after previously holding the passing game coordinator role with the team. Prior to that, he was the offensive coordinator at Colorado State University. He played college football at Ball State University, where he was also a longtime assistant coach.

== Playing career ==
Lynch played quarterback at Ball State from 2003 to 2006 after being recruited by his father Bill. He never played for his father in college however, as the elder Lynch was let go after the 2002 season and Brady Hoke was named the new football head coach for the 2003 season. He was named the starting quarterback his sophomore year and remained the starter until his playing career ended in 2006. He finished his career at Ball State with 4,932 passing yards and 32 touchdowns.

== Coaching career ==
After his playing career ended, Lynch initially accepted a position as a graduate assistant on the Ball State coaching staff, but instead decided to accept a position at Saint Joseph's College in Rensselaer, Indiana as the offensive coordinator and quarterbacks coach. He held this position for one year before joining the coaching staff at Ashland University as the offensive coordinator in 2008.

=== Ball State ===
Lynch joined the coaching staff at his alma mater Ball State as a wide receivers coach in 2009, and was later named the recruiting coordinator in 2010. He was retained by newly hired head coach Pete Lembo in 2010 and shifted to coaching the tight ends position and recruiting coordinator for the 2011 season.

He was promoted to offensive coordinator and quarterbacks coach in December 2013 after Rich Skrosky accepted the head coaching position at Elon.

Lynch added the title of assistant head coach in 2019. He was named a Broyles Award nominee in 2019 after guiding Ball State to a top 25 offense in terms of total yards.

=== Colorado State ===
Lynch was named the offensive coordinator at Colorado State in 2020.

=== Vanderbilt ===
Lynch was hired as the quarterbacks coach and passing game coordinator at Vanderbilt under first-year head coach Clark Lea. Following the 2023 season, it was announced that Lynch would not return to the program for 2024.

=== Texas A&M ===
Lynch later joined Texas A&M as a senior offensive analyst in January 2024. He was promoted to quarterbacks coach on January 1, 2026, after the departure of offensive coordinator Collin Klein.

== Personal life ==
Lynch and his wife Danielle have six children. Lynch's father Bill was the head coach at Ball State and Indiana. His younger brother Kevin was also an assistant coach at Ball State and succeeded Lynch as offensive coordinator following the latter's departure from the program in 2020.
