= Dante Ridgeway =

American football player (born 1984)

No. 84, 4
- Position: Wide receiver

Personal information
- Born: April 18, 1984 (age 42); Chicago, Illinois, U.S.
- Listed height: 6 ft 1 in (1.85 m)
- Listed weight: 200 lb (91 kg)

Career information
- High school: Decatur (IL) MacArthur
- College: Ball State
- NFL draft: 2005: 6th round, 192nd overall pick

Career history
- St. Louis Rams (2005)*; Cincinnati Bengals (2005)*; New York Jets (2005); New Orleans Saints (2006–2007)*; New York Jets (2007)*; New Orleans Saints (2007–2008)*; Peoria Pirates (2009); Chicago Rush (2010)*
- * Offseason or practice squad member only

Awards and highlights
- Second-team All-American (2004); 2× All-MAC (2003, 2004)

Career NFL statistics
- Receptions: 2
- Receiving yards: 26
- Stats at Pro Football Reference

Dante DeAndre Ridgeway (born April 18, 1984) is an American former professional football player who was a wide receiver in the National Football League (NFL). He played college football for the Ball State Cardinals and was selected by the St. Louis Rams in sixth round of the 2005 NFL draft.

Ridgeway was also a member of the Cincinnati Bengals, New York Jets, New Orleans Saints, Peoria Pirates, and Chicago Rush.

== Early life ==
Ridgeway attended Douglas MacArthur High School. As a senior, he was named team's Most Valuable Offensive and Defensive Player after recording 32 receptions for 570 yards (17.81 yards per rec. avg.) and nine touchdowns, returned three punts for touchdowns, was an All-County pick, an All-Big 12 Conference pick, an All-State Honorable Mention selection, and he led his team to an 8–3 record and a berth in the Illinois High School Association Football Playoffs.

For his career, he recorded 1,300 receiving yards and 23 touchdowns.

== College career ==
Ridgeway attended Ball State University where he majored in Criminal justice.

As a freshman in 2002, he played in every game, leading the team in receptions with 44, receiving yards with 556, and receiving yards-per-game averaging 46.33. He also recorded four touchdowns and was named a co-recipient of the John Hodge Award, which goes to Ball State's Most Outstanding Freshman. As a sophomore in 2003, he was an All-MAC selection, starting every game. He set the school season-record for receptions with 89 and receiving yards with 1,075. As a junior in 2004, he earned Second-team All-America honors from the NFL Draft Report, AP, and Walter Camp Football Foundation. He broke the MAC single-season record for receptions with 105. He also led the country in receptions-per-game with 9.55, receiving yards-per-game with 127.18 and total receiving yards with 1,399, the first in school history to record multiple 1,000 yard seasons in a career. After his junior season, Ridgeway left school early for the National Football League. In doing so, he became the first player in Ball State history to leave early for the NFL.

For his career, Ridgeway had 10 100-yard receiving games, breaking the previous school record of seven. In 35 career games, he set school career-records with 238 receptions for 3,030 yards a 12.7 average and 22 touchdowns (second all-time).

== Professional career ==
Pre-draft measurables
Height	Weight	40-yard dash	10-yard split	20-yard split	20-yard shuttle	Three-cone drill	Vertical jump	Broad jump	Bench press	Wonderlic
6 ft 0 in (1.83 m)	206 lb (93 kg)	4.46 s	1.57 s	2.69 s	4.26 s	7.27 s	38 in (0.97 m)	10 ft 5 in (3.18 m)	15 reps	18
From NFL Combine

=== National Football League ===
Ridgeway was selected in the sixth round (192nd overall) of the 2005 NFL draft by the St. Louis Rams and on July 27, 2005, he signed a three-year contract with the Rams. However, on August 30, he was waived by the Rams. He was claimed off of waivers by the Cincinnati Bengals the next day, however, he was waived just four days later. He was then claimed off of waivers by the New York Jets on September 4, 2005.

Ridgeway was on the Jets' practice squad until he was signed to the active roster on November 8. In his professional debut, Week 10 against the Carolina Panthers, he did not record any carries or receptions. During the Jets' Week 11 lost to the Denver Broncos he played on special teams recording one assisted tackle. He also recorded his first career reception, nine yards, and finished the game with two receptions for 26 yards, the second being of 17 yards. During the Jets' Week 14 win over the Oakland Raiders he recorded an assisted special teams tackle. After the season on January 3, 2006, he signed a contract extension as an Exclusive rights free agent.

Ridgeway was waived by the Jets on September 6, 2006. However, he was later signed by the New Orleans Saints in November 2006. However, he was released by the Saints on August 7, 2007. Then on August 12, he was then re-signed by the Jets, only to be released on August 27, 2007. Then on October 9, 2007, he was signed to the Saints' practice squad. On December 26, 2007, he was placed on the practice squad's injured list.

=== af2 ===
After not playing in an NFL game for three seasons, Ridgeway joined the af2. Later he was assigned to the Peoria Pirates. However, on March 10, he was placed on the team's refused-to-report list. After reporting, he was placed on injured reserve on May 6. In his af2 debut, he recorded nine receptions for 99 yards.

== Personal life ==
At the 2005 St. Louis Race for the Cure, a marathon to help support the Susan G. Komen Breast Cancer Foundation, Rams players Alex Barron, Zach Bray, Jeremy Calahan, Jerome Carter, Jeremy Carter, Jerome Collins, Clifford Dukes, Ryan Fitzpatrick, Madison Hedgecock, Reggie Hodges, Jamison Vontrell, Matt McChesney, Duvol Thompson, and Ridgeway presented roses to the breast cancer survivors at the finish line.

On November 20, 2007, Ridgeway, along with teammates Mike McKenzie, Robert Meachem, Lance Moore, Usama Young, Pierre Thomas, Ronnie Ghent, Jermon Bushrod, Billy Miller, Kevin Houser, Josh Cooper, Zach Strief and Jon Stinchcomb volunteered to help hand out frozen turkeys, stuffing, vegetables and corn bread mix to a thousand low-income New Orleans families for Thanksgiving.

== See also ==
- List of NCAA major college football yearly receiving leaders
