= List of Western Michigan Broncos football seasons =

This is a list of seasons completed by the Western Michigan Broncos football team.

== Season ==
Year	Coach	Overall	Conference	Standing	Bowl/playoffs	Coaches^{#}	AP^{°}
Tubby Meyers (1906)
1906	Tubby Meyers	1–2					
Meyers:		1–2					
Bill Spaulding (1907–1921)
1907	Bill Spaulding	4–2–1					
1908	Bill Spaulding	3–4					
1909	Bill Spaulding	7–0					
1910	Bill Spaulding	5-2					
1911	Bill Spaulding	2–3					
1912	Bill Spaulding	3–2–1					
1913	Bill Spaulding	4–0					
1914	Bill Spaulding	6–0					
1915	Bill Spaulding	5–1					
1916	Bill Spaulding	5–1					
1917	Bill Spaulding	4–3					
1918	Bill Spaulding	3–2					
1919	Bill Spaulding	4–1					
1920	Bill Spaulding	3–4					
1921	Bill Spaulding	6–2					
Bill Spaulding:		62–25–3					
Milton Olander (1922–1923)
1922	Milton Olander	6–0					
1923	Milton Olander	6–1–1					
Milton Olander:		12–1–1					
Earl Martineau (1924–1928)
1924	Earl Martineau	5–1–1					
1925	Earl Martineau	6–2–1					
1926	Earl Martineau	7–1					
1927	Earl Martineau	3–4					
1928	Earl Martineau	5–2					
Earl Martineau:		26–10–2					
Mike Gary (1929–1941)
1929	Mike Gary	5–2–1	2–0–1	1st			
1930	Mike Gary	5–1–1					
1931	Mike Gary	5–2					
1932	Mike Gary	6–0–1					
1933	Mike Gary	3–3–1					
1934	Mike Gary	7–1					
1935	Mike Gary	5–3					
1936	Mike Gary	2–5					
1937	Mike Gary	5–3					
1938	Mike Gary	4–3					
1939	Mike Gary	2–6–1					
1940	Mike Gary	2–5					
1941	Mike Gary	8–0					
Mike Gary:		59–34–5					
John Gill (1942–1952)
1942	John Gill	5–1					
1943	John Gill	4–2					
1944	John Gill	4–3					
1945	John Gill	4–3					
1946	John Gill	5–2–1					
1947	John Gill	5–4					
1948	John Gill	6–3	3–1	2nd			
1949	John Gill	4–4	2–3	4th			
1950	John Gill	5–4	1–3	5th			
1951	John Gill	4–4	1–4	6th			
1952	John Gill	4–4	1–4	6th			
John Gill:		50–34–1	8–15				
Jack Petoskey (1953–1956)
1953	Jack Petoskey	1–6–1	0–4–1	6th			
1954	Jack Petoskey	4–5	3–4	5th			
1955	Jack Petoskey	1–7–1	0–5	7th			
1956	Jack Petoskey	2–7	1–4	6th			
Jack Petoskey:		8–25–2	4–17–1				
Merle Schlosser (1957–1963)
1957	Merle Schlosser	4–4–1	1–4–1	5th			
1958	Merle Schlosser	4–5	2–4	5th			
1959	Merle Schlosser	4–5	3–3	5th			
1960	Merle Schlosser	4–4–1	2–4	5th			
1961	Merle Schlosser	5–4–1	4–1–1	2nd	L 28–12 Aviation Bowl		
1962	Merle Schlosser	5–4	3–3	4th			
1963	Merle Schlosser	2–7	2–4	5th			
Merle Schlosser:		28–33–3	17–23–2				
Bill Doolittle (1964–1974)
1964	Bill Doolittle	3–6	2–4	5th			
1965	Bill Doolittle	6–2–1	3–2–1	3rd			
1966	Bill Doolittle	7–3	5–1	1st			
1967	Bill Doolittle	5–4	4–2	3rd			
1968	Bill Doolittle	3–6	2–4	5th			
1969	Bill Doolittle	4–6	1–4	5th			
1970	Bill Doolittle	7–3	2–3	4th			
1971	Bill Doolittle	7–3	2–3	4th			
1972	Bill Doolittle	7–3–1	2–2–1	3rd			
1973	Bill Doolittle	6–5	1–4	5th			
1974	Bill Doolittle	3–8	0–5	5th			
Bill Doolittle:		58–49–2	24–34–2				
Elliot Uzelac (1975–1981)
1975	Elliot Uzelac	1–10	0–7	9th			
1976	Elliot Uzelac	7–4	6–3	4th			
1977	Elliot Uzelac	4–7	3–5	7th			
1978	Elliot Uzelac	7–4	5–4	4th			
1979	Elliot Uzelac	6–5	5–4	3rd			
1980	Elliot Uzelac	7–4	6–3	2nd			
1981	Elliot Uzelac	6–5	5–4	5th			
Elliot Uzelac:		38–39	30–30				
Jack Harbaugh (1982–1986)
1982	Jack Harbaugh	7–2–2	5–2–2	2nd			
1983	Jack Harbaugh	6–5	4–5	6th			
1984	Jack Harbaugh	5–6	3–6	8th			
1985	Jack Harbaugh	4–6–1	4–4–1	5th			
1986	Jack Harbaugh	3–8	3–5	8th			
Jack Harbaugh:		25–27–3	19–22–3				
Al Molde (1987–1996)
1987	Al Molde	5–6	4–4	5th			
1988	Al Molde	9–3	7–1	1st	L 35–30 California Bowl		
1989	Al Molde	5–6	3–5	6th			
1990	Al Molde	7–4	5–3	3rd			
1991	Al Molde	6–5	4–4	5th			
1992	Al Molde	7–3–1	6–3	2nd			
1993	Al Molde	7–3–1	6–1–1	2nd			
1994	Al Molde	7–4	5–3	3rd			
1995	Al Molde	7–4	6–2	3rd			
1996	Al Molde	2–9	2–6	9th			
Al Molde:		62–47–2	48–32–1				
Gary Darnell (1997–2004)
1997	Gary Darnell	8–3	6–2	2nd (West)			
1998	Gary Darnell	7–4	5–3	3rd (West)			
1999	Gary Darnell	7–5	6–2	1st (West)	L 34–30 MAC Championship		
2000	Gary Darnell	9–3	7–1	1st (West)	L 19–14 MAC Championship		
2001	Gary Darnell	5–6	4–4	4th (West)			
2002	Gary Darnell	4–8	3–5	5th (West)			
2003	Gary Darnell	5–7	4–4	4th (West)			
2004	Gary Darnell	1–10	0–8	7th (West)			
Gary Darnell:		46–46	35–29				
Bill Cubit (2005–2012)
2005	Bill Cubit	7–4	5–3	3rd (West)			
2006	Bill Cubit	8–5	6–2	2nd (West)	L 27–24 International Bowl		
2007	Bill Cubit	5–7	3–4	4th (West)			
2008	Bill Cubit	9–4	6–2	T-2nd (West)	L 38–14 Texas Bowl		
2009	Bill Cubit	5–7	4–4	3rd (West)			
2010	Bill Cubit	6–6	5–3	3rd (West)			
2011	Bill Cubit	7–6	5–3	3rd (West)	L 37–32 Little Caesars Pizza Bowl		
2012	Bill Cubit	4–8	2–6	5th (West)			
Bill Cubit:		51–46	36–27				
P. J. Fleck (2013–2016)
2013	P. J. Fleck	1–11	1–7	T-5th (West)			
2014	P. J. Fleck	8–5	6–2	3rd (West)	L 38–24 Famous Idaho Potato Bowl		
2015	P. J. Fleck	8–5	6–2	T-1st (West)	W 45–31 Bahamas Bowl		
2016	P. J. Fleck	13–1	8–0	1st (West)	L 24–16 Cotton Bowl Classic	18	15
P. J. Fleck:		30–22	21–11				
Tim Lester (2017–2022)
2017	Tim Lester	6–6	4–4	4th (West)			
2018	Tim Lester	7–6	5–3	T–2nd (West)	L 49–18 Famous Idaho Potato Bowl		
2019	Tim Lester	7–6	5–3	2nd (West)	L 23–20 First Responder Bowl		
2020	Tim Lester	4–2	4–2	T–2nd (West)			
2021	Tim Lester	8–5	4–4	T–4th (West)	W 52–24 Quick Lane Bowl		
2022	Tim Lester	5–7	4–4	3rd (West)			
Tim Lester:		36–32	25–20				
Lance Taylor (2023–present)
2023	Lance Taylor	4–8	3–5	T–4th (West)			
2024	Lance Taylor	6–7	5–3	5th	L 30–23 Salute to Veterans Bowl		
2025	Lance Taylor	10–4	7–1	1st	W 41–6 Myrtle Beach Bowl		
Lance Taylor:		20–19	15–9				
Total:		613–492–24					
National championship Conference title Conference division title or championship game berth
^{†}Indicates Bowl Coalition, Bowl Alliance, BCS, or CFP / New Years' Six bowl.; ^{#}Rankings from final Coaches Poll.
