= Steve Morrison (American football) =

American football player and coach (born 1971)

Indiana State Sycamores
- Title: Defensive coordinator & linebackers coach

Personal information
- Born: December 28, 1971 (age 54); Birmingham, Michigan, U.S.
- Listed height: 6 ft 3 in (1.91 m)
- Listed weight: 238 lb (108 kg)

Career information
- High school: Brother Rice (Bloomfield Township, Michigan)
- College: Michigan
- NFL draft: 1995: undrafted

Career history

Playing
- Indianapolis Colts (1995–1998)

Coaching
- Brother Rice HS (MI) (2000–2001) Defensive coordinator; Michigan (2002–2004) Assistant coach; Western Michigan (2005) Defensive line coach; Western Michigan (2006–2007) Linebackers coach; Western Michigan (2008–2009) Defensive coordinator; Eastern Michigan (2010–2011) Linebackers coach; Syracuse (2012) Linebackers coach; Bowling Green (2019–2022) Associate head coach & linebackers coach; Bowling Green (2023–2024) Defensive coordinator & linebackers coach; Anthony Wayne HS (OH) (2025–2026) Defensive coordinator; Indiana State (2026–present) Defensive Coordinator & Linebackers

Awards and highlights
- First-team All-Big Ten (1994); Second-team All-Big Ten (1992)

Career NFL statistics
- Tackles: 152
- Fumble recoveries: 4
- Interceptions: 2
- Quarterback sacks: 2.0
- Stats at Pro Football Reference

Steven Craig Morrison (born December 28, 1971) is an American former professional football player who was a linebacker for the Indianapolis Colts of the National Football League (NFL) from 1995 to 1998. He is currently the defensive coordinator & linebackers coach for the Indiana State Sycamores. He previously served as the linebackers coach for the Eastern Michigan Eagles, on the coaching staff for Western Michigan Broncos, and as the linebackers coach for the Syracuse Orange. Prior to these professional experiences, he had excelled in college football as an All-Big Ten Conference inside linebacker from 1990 to 1994 for the Michigan Wolverines, whom he served as captain. In high school, he had been a Detroit Free Press first-team All-State (Michigan) and second-team All-Midwest selection in football and an All-American in lacrosse.

After retiring from professional football as a player, he gained his first two years of coaching experience as the defensive coordinator for Michigan High School Athletic Association football champion Brother Rice High School (his high school alma mater). He then served as an assistant coach at the University of Michigan for three years. He then assumed a role as an assistant at Western Michigan University. At Western Michigan, he has served as the linebacker coach after spending a year as the defensive line coach. The 2009 Western Michigan Broncos season marked Morrison's fifth season on the team's staff, his fourth as linebacker coach and his second as defensive coordinator. He then went on to serve as the linebackers coach at Eastern Michigan and Syracuse. In 2019, he was hired as the associate head coach/ linebackers coach at Bowling Green State University. After the conclusion of the 2022 season, Morrison was promoted to defensive coordinator.

== Early life ==
Barbara Morrison, Steve's mother, says Steve was read his last rites on the day of his birth because he had the same lung disease that Patrick Kennedy, the son of United States President John F. Kennedy, died from. He was then put in an incubator where his mother could not touch him for 12 months. Morrison wanted to be a linebacker because of the tenacity of the position. His favorite book was a book about Jack Lambert and Jack Ham and he grew up a Pittsburgh Steelers fan. He played soccer when he was a youth.

=== High school ===
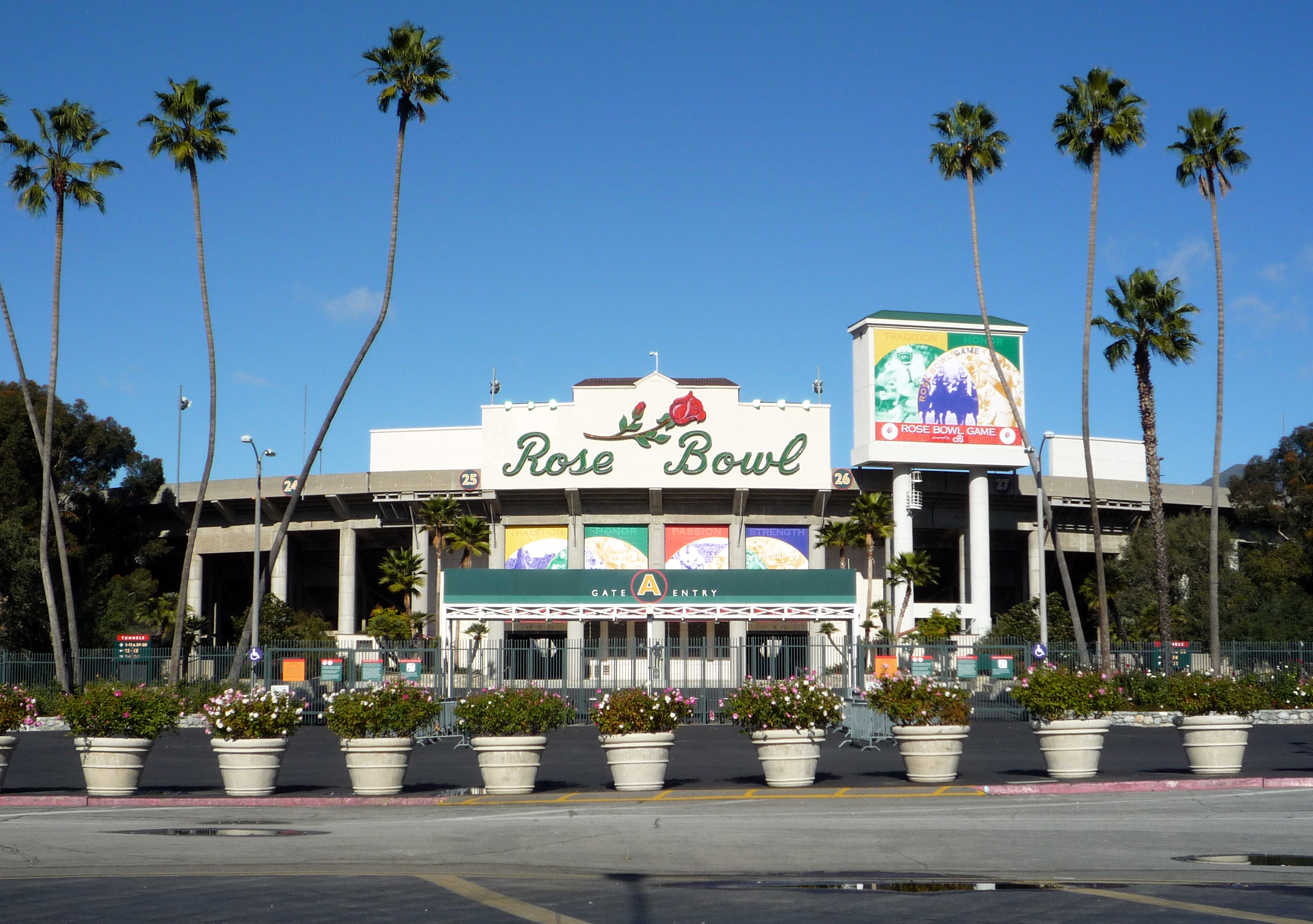
Morrison and both the 1991 and 1992 Big Ten Champions appeared in the Rose Bowl.

Morrison competed for Brother Rice High School of the Detroit, Michigan Catholic High School League. As a junior who played both fullback and linebacker, he was sidelined for the remainder of the season with a knee injury in his third game, but the team went 7–2 for the season despite his injury. As a senior, Morrison was part of a 1989 team that lost in the Class A semifinals 6–0 to Martin Luther King High School at Atwood Stadium. The team had been ranked as the number three high school team in the Metro Detroit Area by the Detroit Free Press in its pre-season poll. Morrison had been hailed as a blue chip athlete entering his senior season in the same pre-season summary. The team was 11–0 and the number one ranked area high school team prior to the loss. Once, Morrison executed an 82-yard punt during a high school game. During his senior season, his coach, Al Fracassa, was the Detroit Free Press Coach of the Year and Morrison was a First-Team All-Metro Detroit selection at linebacker. However, fellow fullback/linebacker two-way Detroit area player Jerome Bettis was the first team fullback. Both players earned first-team Detroit Free Press All-State honors. However, a poll of 14 experts selected Bettis first-team all-Midwest (Big Ten States of Illinois, Indiana, Iowa, Michigan, Minnesota, Ohio and Wisconsin because Penn State had not yet joined the conference), but only selected Morrison second-team all Midwest. In high school, Morrison was an All-American in lacrosse, along with Brother Rice and Michigan football teammate Gannon Dudlar. He was a Catholic High School League Hall of Fame athlete and was inducted in the 1995 Hall of Fame class that included Shawn Respert, among others.

=== College ===
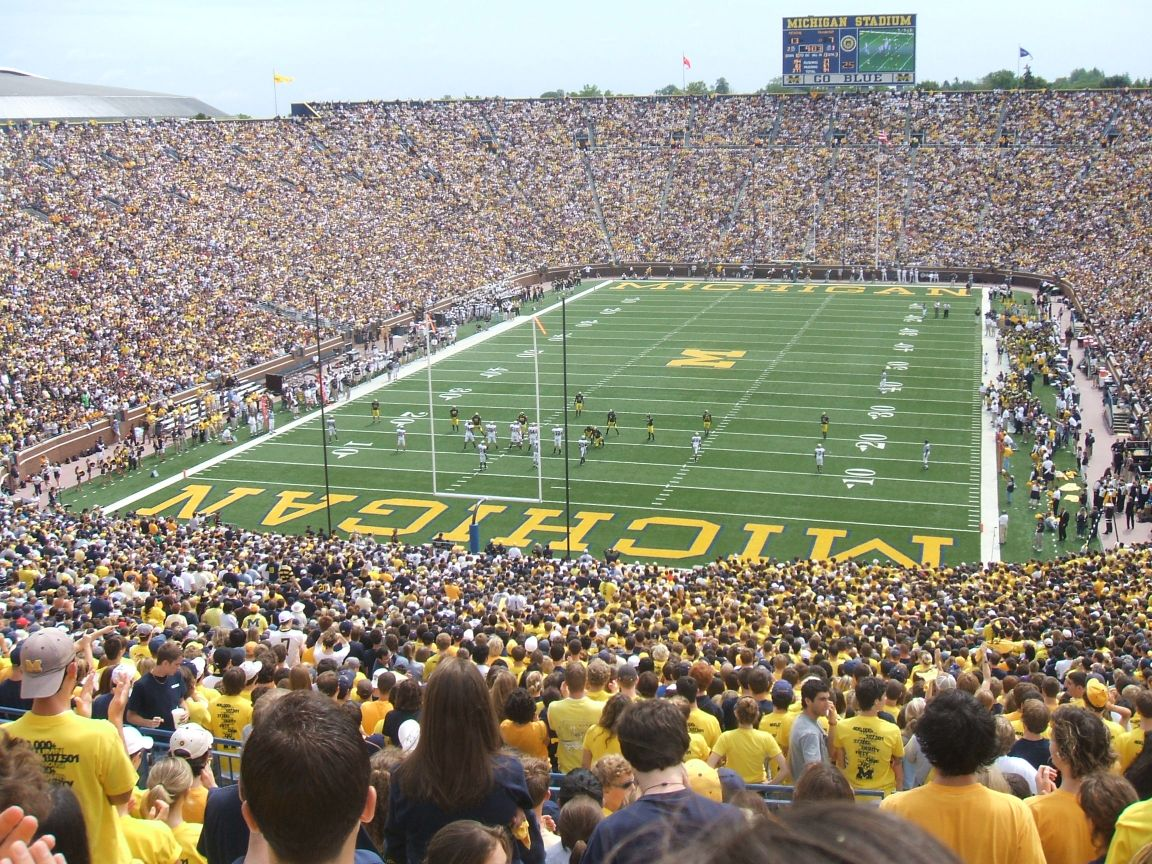
Morrison holds the total tackles record for Michigan Stadium.

After attending Brother Rice High School in Bloomfield Hills, Michigan, his college decision eventually came down to a choice between Michigan and Michigan State University. He was part of a highly touted Michigan recruiting class that was ranked fourth in the nation and that included five of the top twelve players in the state and seven of the top twelve regional players. He spent five years at the University of Michigan where he anchored the defense as an inside linebacker. In 1990, he was the first true freshman to start on defense since 1987. In his 1991 debut for Michigan against the Boston College Eagles, he opposed former Brother Rice teammate Pete Mitchell, who was appearing in his first game. On Mitchell's first career catch, Morrison was warned for making a late hit against Mitchell. A total of seven Brother Rice alumni played in the game. He became a rare five-year varsity letter winner while wearing #36 for the Michigan Wolverines football program from 1990 to 1994, He was mentored by 1991 Butkus Award winner Erick Anderson. He helped the 1990 three-peat Big Ten Conference Champions defend their title for a total of five consecutive conference championships ending in 1992. The 1991 and 1992 teams went to the Rose Bowl. During the 1992 season, he replaced Anderson, who had led Michigan in tackles four consecutive seasons, as the defensive signal caller. He was named the Big Ten Defensive Player of the Week after making 15 tackles against Purdue Boilermakers on October 31, 1992. He was named the 1992 winner of The Roger Zatkoff Award as the team's best linebacker.

He became team captain in 1994 for coach Gary Moeller. On a team that had two All-Americans (Ty Law and Remy Hamilton), he was one of six All-Big Ten players (Law, Hamilton, Tyrone Wheatley, Amani Toomer and Jason Horn) and a Butkus Award semifinalist. Morrison earned his bachelor's degree in sports management and communications in 1994 from Michigan.

At the time of his graduation, he ranked third in career tackles in school history, behind Anderson and Ron Simpkins. He has since been passed by Jarrett Irons and Sam Sword, and he stands fifth with 220 tackles. In terms of tackles and assists combined, Morrison once totaled 23 in a November 14, 1992 game against the Illinois Fighting Illini football team, which stands as a Michigan Football record for a game at Michigan Stadium. Morrison suffered compartmental syndrome in his calf, which necessitated surgical repair to stop internal bleeding, during his 1990 freshman season, for which he earned a medical redshirt season by the NCAA. As a sophomore (redshirt freshman), he sat out four games with a broken leg. In 1993, he missed the first seven games with a broken foot.

== Professional career ==
=== NFL ===
He was not drafted in the 1995 NFL draft, but signed with the Indianapolis Colts as a free agent after the draft. He played with the Colts from 1995 to 1998. He accumulated 2 quarterback sacks, 2 interceptions, and 4 fumble recoveries. Although the Colts best records during his tenure was 9–7 in both 1995 and 1996, the team made the playoffs twice and Morrison had a chance to play in an American Football Conference Championship game. During the 1995–1996 NFL playoffs, the Colts won two playoff games on the road under Ted Marchibroda to reach the championship game against the Pittsburgh Steelers. Despite the playoff success, they changed coaches, as Lindy Infante took them back to the 1996–1997 NFL playoffs with a 9–7 record, only to fall in the wild card game to the Steelers again. Morrison started 31 games over the course of his career, including 29 regular season games. In 1997 and 1998, the team had losing seasons, although Morrison started more games as his career progressed. Morrison was signed by the Detroit Lions for the 1999 NFL season, but he was waived before the season started.

=== Early coaching experience ===
He served as the defensive coordinator for his high school alma mater, Brother Rice Warriors, in 2000 and 2001. In 2000, they won the Michigan High School Athletic Association Division 2 football championship. He was a member of the coaching staff, when his high school coach Fracassa became the winningest coach in Michigan High School football history. From 2002 to 2004 he served in various capacities on the defensive coaching staff for the Michigan Wolverines. In 2002, he served as the video assistant. In 2003, he became a graduate assistant/outside linebackers coach.

=== Western Michigan (2005–2009) ===
In 2005, he took the Western Michigan defensive line coaching position on new head coach Bill Cubit's staff. That same year, Scott Shafer assumed the defensive coordinator position at Western Michigan, and Morrison served under him. Then, in 2006, Morrison assumed the linebacker coach position. The defense immediately produced results: #1 in the country in interceptions, #1 in sacks per game, and a Mid-American Conference record rushing yards per game defense. In addition to the team numbers he fostered Ameer Ismail, the nation's leader in quarterback sacks and tackles for a loss.

On March 12, 2008, after defensive coordinator Bill Miller left to be the Louisville Cardinals football linebacker coach, Western Michigan promoted Morrison to defensive coordinator, and he relinquished his recruiting coordinator role to tight ends coach Jake Moreland. He continued to serve as the linebackers coach in 2008. He converted the defensive scheme from a two-gap scheme to a one-gap scheme upon taking over as defensive coordinator. His coaching style is considered a compromise between styles of the previous coordinators: the highly enthusiastic Shafer style and the laid back Miller style. The 2008 Western Michigan Broncos football team compiled a 9–3 (6–2 conference) record earning them a trip to the 2008 Texas Bowl to face the Rice Owls. His defense ranked toward the middle of the MAC. Rice blew out Western Michigan by taking a 38–0 lead before allowing two late fourth quarter touchdowns for a 38–14 final score. On the eve of the Bowl game, the Broncos signed head coach Cubit to a five-year extension and there was no indication he intended to make any changes in his staff. Morrison's 2008 defense produced first-team All-MAC selection Louis Delmas, who appeared in the January 24, 2009 Senior Bowl and was the first safety chosen in the 2009 NFL draft. After a disappointing 2009 Western Michigan season in which WMU ranked 102 out of 120 Division I teams, Morrison was fired and replaced by former Hofstra coach Dave Cohen.

=== Eastern Michigan (2010–2011) ===
Morrison served as the linebackers coach for Eastern Michigan University under head coach Ron English and defensive coordinator Phil Snow. The 2010 Eagles posted a 2–10 record.

=== Syracuse (2012) ===
In January 2012, Steve Morrison joined the Syracuse Orangemen football team staff as the linebackers coach, reuniting with his former Western Michigan defensive coordinator, Scott Schafer, the defensive coordinator for the Syracuse Orangemen. He also joined former Michigan teammate Tyrone Wheatley on the coaching staff. In January 2013, Morrison left the team for "personal reasons".

=== Bowling Green (2019–2024) ===
Morrison was hired by former Michigan teammate Scot Loeffler to be his associate head coach and linebackers coach for the Bowling Green Falcons football. In March 2025, Morrison departed from the team after six seasons with the staff.

== Family ==
In college, Morrison's family hosted various teammates such as Todd Collins at Christmas time. This is part of a Michigan football tradition that when the team is playing late season Bowl games, the players from outside the Midwest spend Christmas Eve and Christmas Day morning with local families. Morrison is married to former University of Michigan softball captain Mary Campana. The couple had their third child on May 23, 2007. They now have three sons: Alexander (8–29–01), Marco (11–18–04) and Roman (5–23–07).
