= Brandon West (Canadian football) =

American gridiron football player (born 1987)

No. 9
- Position: Running back

Personal information
- Born: September 8, 1987 (age 39); Brunswick, Georgia, U.S.
- Listed height: 5 ft 10 in (1.78 m)
- Listed weight: 193 lb (88 kg)

Career information
- High school: Kingsland (GA) Camden Co.
- College: Western Michigan
- NFL draft: 2010: undrafted

Career history
- 2011–2012: Saskatchewan Roughriders
- 2017–2019: Bloomington Edge

Awards and highlights
- Second-team All-MAC (2009)
- Stats at CFL.ca

Brandon West (born September 8, 1987) is an American former professional football running back. He played two seasons with the Saskatchewan Roughriders of the Canadian Football League after signing with the club on March 8, 2011. West played high school football at Camden County High School in Kingsland, Georgia, where he set the individual career scoring record. He played college football at Western Michigan. West set numerous records, including two NCAA records for all-purpose yards and kick return yards. West was a four-time college All-American from 2006 to 2009.

On February 1, 2017, West signed with the Bloomington Edge of Champions Indoor Football.
