= 2008 Western Michigan Broncos football team =

American college football season

2008 Western Michigan Broncos football

Texas Bowl, L 14–38 vs. Rice
- Conference: Mid-American Conference
- West
- Record: 9–4 (6–2 MAC)
- Head coach: Bill Cubit (4th season)
- Offensive scheme: Multiple
- Defensive coordinator: Steve Morrison (1st season)
- Base defense: 4–3
- Home stadium: Waldo Stadium (Capacity: 30,200)

2008 Mid-American Conference football standings
	Conf.			Overall
Team	W		L	W		L
East Division
Buffalo x$	5	–	3	8	–	6
Bowling Green	4	–	4	6	–	6
Temple	4	–	4	5	–	7
Ohio	3	–	5	4	–	8
Akron	3	–	5	5	–	7
Kent State	3	–	5	4	–	8
Miami (OH)	1	–	7	2	–	10
West Division
Ball State x	8	–	0	12	–	2
Central Michigan	6	–	2	8	–	5
Western Michigan	6	–	2	9	–	4
Northern Illinois	5	–	3	6	–	7
Toledo	2	–	6	3	–	9
Eastern Michigan	2	–	6	3	–	9
Championship: Buffalo 42, Ball State 24
$ – Conference champion; x – Division champion/co-champions

The 2008 Western Michigan Broncos football team represented Western Michigan University in the 2008 NCAA football season. The team was coached by Bill Cubit and played their homes game in Waldo Stadium in Kalamazoo, Michigan.

Western Michigan was 9–4 overall and 6–2 in the Mid-American Conference after defeating conference opponents Northern Illinois, Temple, Ohio, Buffalo, Eastern Michigan and Toledo, Big Ten Conference member Illinois, Western Athletic Conference member Idaho and Football Championship Subdivision team Tennessee Tech. Western Michigan lost to Nebraska, rival Central Michigan and Ball State. Western Michigan played in the 2008 Texas Bowl, where they fell to Rice on December 30, 2008.

Over the course of the 2008 season, the Broncos received votes in the AP Poll and the USA Today Coaches Poll, culminating with a top 30 ranking and 9–2 record in week 13. The Broncos no longer received votes after dropping their final two games.

== Preseason ==
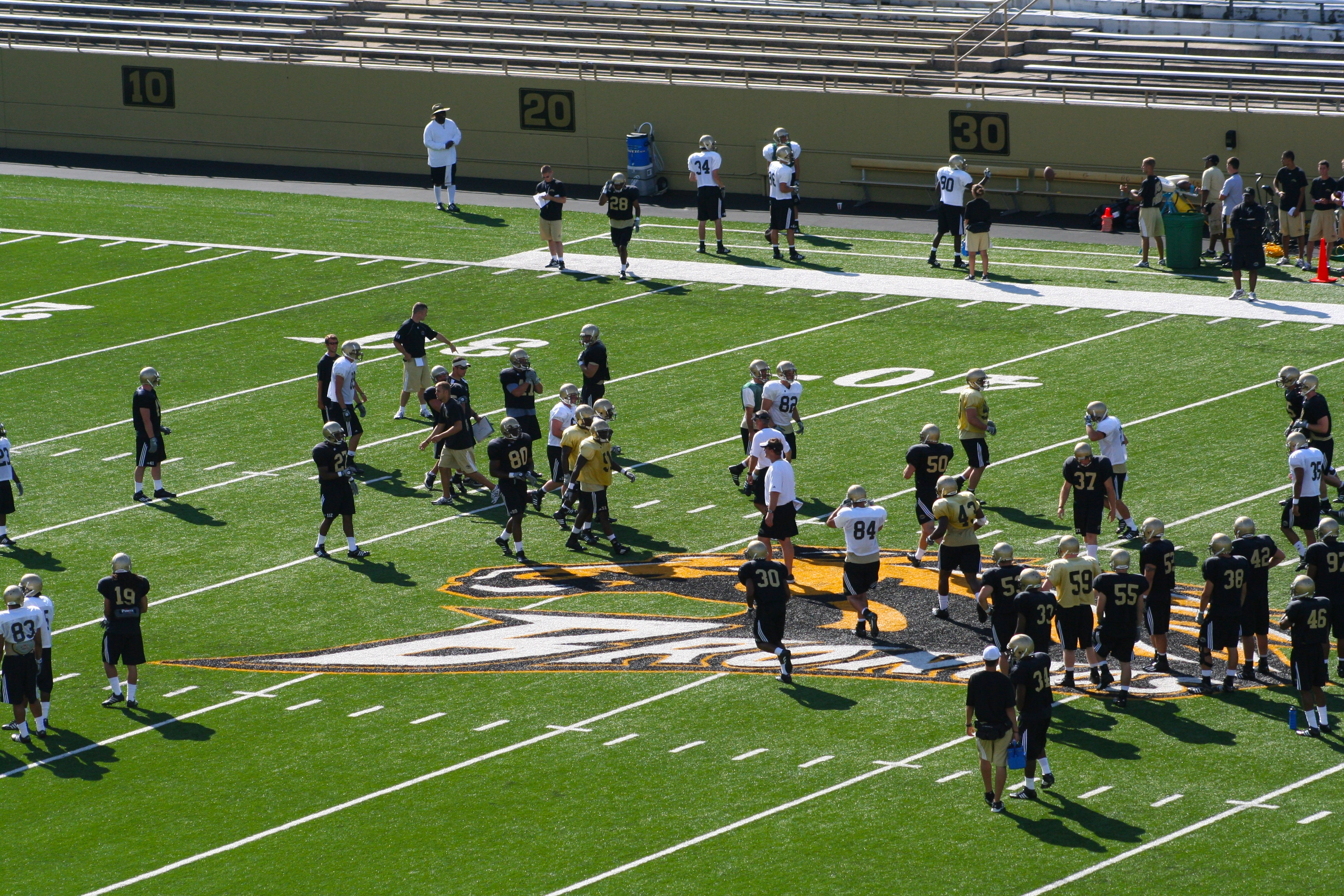
Football team during a preseason practice at Waldo Stadium.

WMU was picked to finish third in the West Division, according to the MAC News Media Association. The Broncos also earned two first place votes and one vote to win the MAC Championship Game. Rival Central Michigan was picked to win the West Division. Bowling Green was selected to win the East Division.

=== Watch lists ===
- Louis Delmas, FS – East–West Shrine Game
- Londen Fryar, CB – East–West Shrine Game, Jim Thorpe Award
- Branden Ledbetter, TE – John Mackey Award
- Jamarko Simmons, WR – East–West Shrine Game

=== Recruiting class ===
The 2008 recruiting class was ranked #1 in the MAC and #65 overall by Rivals.

== Schedule ==
Date	Time	Opponent	Site	TV	Result	Attendance
August 30	7:00 pm	at Nebraska*	Memorial Stadium; Lincoln, Nebraska	Fox Sports Net	L 24–47	84,485
September 6	7:00 pm	Northern Illinois	Waldo Stadium; Kalamazoo, Michigan		W 29–26	26,262
September 13	5:00 pm	at Idaho*	Kibbie Dome; Moscow, Idaho	ALT	W 51–28	15,003
September 20	7:00 pm	Tennessee Tech*	Waldo Stadium; Kalamazoo, Michigan		W 41–7	19,768
September 27	2:00 pm	at Temple	Lincoln Financial Field; Philadelphia		W 7–3	17,624
October 4	2:00 pm	Ohio^{†}	Waldo Stadium; Kalamazoo, Michigan		W 41–20	20,133
October 11	3:30 pm	at Buffalo	University at Buffalo Stadium; Amherst, New York	TWCSN	W 34–28 ^{OT}	15,025
October 18	12:00 pm	at Central Michigan	Kelly/Shorts Stadium; Mount Pleasant, Michigan (CMU–WMU Rivalry Trophy, Michigan MAC Trophy)	ESPN GamePlan	L 28–38	30,302
November 1	2:00 pm	Eastern Michigan	Waldo Stadium; Kalamazoo, Michigan (Michigan MAC Trophy)		W 31–10	19,917
November 8	12:00 pm	vs. Illinois*	Ford Field; Detroit	ESPN GamePlan	W 23–17	12,865
November 15	2:00 pm	Toledo	Waldo Stadium; Kalamazoo, Michigan	FSN Detroit/FSN Ohio	W 27–17	12,336
November 25	7:00 pm	at No. 15 Ball State	Scheumann Stadium; Muncie, Indiana	ESPN2	L 22–45	23,861
December 30	8:00 pm	vs. Rice*	Reliant Stadium; Houston (Texas Bowl)	NFL Network	L 14–38	58,880
*Non-conference game; ^{†}Homecoming; Rankings from USA Today Coaches' Poll; All times are in Eastern time

== Game summaries ==
=== Nebraska ===
	1	2	3	4	Total
Western Michigan (0–1)	0	10	7	7	24
Nebraska (1–0)	14	20	10	3	47

Nebraska jumped out to a 17–0 lead in the second quarter that Western Michigan could not recover from.

WMU quarterback Tim Hiller was 30 of 49 for 342 yards and two touchdowns. Tight end Branden Ledbetter caught nine balls for 123 yards and a touchdown. The Broncos were held to eight rushing yards for the game.

Recap | Boxscore | WMU pregame notes

=== Northern Illinois ===
	1	2	3	4	Total
Northern Illinois (0–2)	7	3	3	13	26
Western Michigan (1–1)	7	7	0	15	29

In the Mid-American Conference opening game for both teams, WMU overcame a 19–14 fourth quarter NIU lead with two Tim Hiller touchdown passes in the span of three minutes and six seconds. Hiller completed 21 of 30 passes for 186 yards and three touchdowns for the game and running back Brandon West carried the ball 25 times for 175 yards.

NIU was playing without its freshman starting quarterback Chandler Harnish who left the game in the first quarter due to an injury. NIU outgained WMU 439 to 384 in total yards and had possession of the ball for 34:20 opposed to WMU's 25:40 time of possession.

Recap | Boxscore | WMU pregame notes

=== Idaho ===
	1	2	3	4	Total
Western Michigan (2–1)	7	7	23	14	51
Idaho (1–2)	7	0	7	14	28

After Idaho scored early in the third quarter to tie the game at 14–14, WMU outscored the Vandals 37–14 to cruise to a 51–28 win over the Western Athletic Conference member. WMU quarterback Tim Hiller completed 23 of 31 passes for 241 yards and four touchdowns. Wide receiver Jamarko Simmons caught six passes for 86 yards and two touchdowns.

Despite outgaining WMU 455 yards to 416 yards, Idaho could not stop WMU from scoring 23 points in 4:32 during the third quarter to put the game away.

Recap | Boxscore | WMU pregame notes

=== Tennessee Tech ===
	1	2	3	4	Total
Tennessee Tech (2–2)	7	0	0	0	7
Western Michigan (3–1)	13	14	14	0	41

Led by quarterback Tim Hiller's five touchdown passes, Western Michigan defeated Football Championship Subdivision opponent Tennessee Tech 41–7. The Broncos outgained Tennessee Tech 633 yards to 251 and gained 30 first downs compared to 13. Hiller completed 27 of 31 passes for 333 yards and running back Brandon West carried the ball for 133 yards and a touchdown on 14 rushes. Wide receiver Jamarko Simmons led all receivers with 10 catches for 115 yards and a touchdown.

Recap | Boxscore | WMU pregame notes

=== Temple ===
	1	2	3	4	Total
Western Michigan (4–1)	0	0	7	0	7
Temple (1–4)	3	0	0	0	3

Recap | Boxscore | WMU pregame notes

=== Ohio ===
	1	2	3	4	Total
Ohio (1–5)	0	7	0	13	20
Western Michigan (5–1)	5	6	10	20	41

Recap | Boxscore | WMU pregame notes

=== Buffalo ===
	1	2	3	4	OT	Total
Western Michigan (6–1)	0	3	3	22	6	34
Buffalo (2–4)	7	7	7	7	0	28

Recap | Boxscore | WMU pregame notes

=== Central Michigan ===
	1	2	3	4	Total
Western Michigan (6–2)	7	7	7	7	28
Central Michigan (5–2)	14	7	7	10	38

Recap | Boxscore | WMU pregame notes

=== Eastern Michigan ===
	1	2	3	4	Total
Eastern Michigan (2–8)	0	7	3	0	10
Western Michigan (7–2)	10	7	0	14	31

Recap | Boxscore | WMU pregame notes

=== Illinois ===
	1	2	3	4	Total
Illinois (5–5)	7	0	3	7	17
Western Michigan (8–2)	3	17	0	3	23

Recap | Boxscore | WMU pregame notes

=== Toledo ===
	1	2	3	4	Total
Toledo (2–8)	7	0	0	10	17
Western Michigan (9–2)	0	10	10	7	27

Recap | Boxscore | WMU pregame notes

=== Ball State ===
	1	2	3	4	Total
Western Michigan (9–3)	7	7	0	8	22
Ball State (12–0)	14	10	14	7	45

Recap | Boxscore | WMU pregame notes

=== Rice ===
	1	2	3	4	Total
Western Michigan (9–4)	0	0	0	14	14
Rice (10–3)	10	14	7	7	38

Recap | Boxscore | WMU pregame notes

== Awards ==
=== Mid-American Conference Player of the Week ===
- Offense
  - Tim Hiller, QB (2) – week 3 (23–31, 74.2%, 241 yards, four touchdowns), week 7 (42–63, 345 yards, four touchdowns, school record for pass completions and attempts)
  - Jamarko Simmons, WR – week 11 (11 catches, 174 yards, touchdown)
- Defense
  - E. J. Biggers, CB – week 10 (Nine tackles, one tackle for a loss, interception, pass break up)
  - Louis Delmas, FS (2) – week 2 (10 tackles, interception, fumble recovery), week 11 (12 tackles)
  - Boston McCornell, LB – week 5 (10 tackles (six solo tackles), forced fumble, fumble recovery)
- Special teams
  - John Potter, PK – week 11 (three field goals (31, 22, 45 yards), two point after touchdowns)
  - Brandon West, RB/KR – week 6 (239 all-purpose yards, three touchdowns (one rushing, two receiving))
  - Aaron Winchester, RB/KR – week 12 (71 kick return yards, 111 rushing yards, 22 receiving yards, 204 all-purpose yards)

=== Mid-American Conference Scholar Athlete of the Week ===
- Tim Hiller, QB – week 2, week 3

=== John Mackey National Tight End of the Week ===
- Branden Ledbetter, TE – week 7 (six receptions, 40 yards, touchdown)

=== All-MAC Team ===
Western Michigan had 12 All-MAC selections.

- First team
  - Louis Delmas, FS
  - Austin Pritchard, LB
  - Jamarko Simmons, WR
- Second team
  - E. J. Biggers, CB
  - Zach Davidson, DL
  - Londen Fryar, CB
  - Branden Ledbetter, TE
- Third team
  - Tim Hiller, QB
  - Boston McCornell, LB
  - Juan Nunez, WR
  - Phillip Sawnson, OL
  - Brandon West, RB

== Coaching staff ==
- Bill Cubit – Head Coach
- Steve Morrison – Defensive Coordinator
- Tim Daoust – Defensive Secondary
- Mike Grant – Wide Receivers
- Rick Kravitz – Safeties
- Peter McCarthy – Defensive Line
- Jake Moreland – Tight Ends
- A. J. Ricker – Offensive Assistant
- Mike Sabock – Running Backs, Special Teams
- Bob Stanley – Offensive Line
- Tim Knox – Director of Football Operations
- Ryan Cubit – Offensive Graduate Assistant
- Matt Ludeman – Defensive Graduate Assistant
