= 2009 Western Michigan Broncos football team =

American college football season

2009 Western Michigan Broncos football
- Conference: Mid-American Conference
- West Division
- Record: 5–7 (4–4 MAC)
- Head coach: Bill Cubit (5th season)
- Offensive scheme: Multiple
- Defensive coordinator: Steve Morrison (2nd season)
- Base defense: 4–3
- Home stadium: Waldo Stadium

2009 Mid-American Conference football standings
	Conf.			Overall
Team	W		L	W		L
East Division
Ohio xy	7	–	1	9	–	5
Temple x	7	–	1	9	–	4
Bowling Green	6	–	2	7	–	6
Kent State	4	–	4	5	–	7
Buffalo	3	–	5	5	–	7
Akron	2	–	6	3	–	9
Miami (OH)	1	–	7	1	–	11
West Division
No. 23 Central Michigan x$	8	–	0	12	–	2
Northern Illinois	5	–	3	7	–	6
Western Michigan	4	–	4	5	–	7
Toledo	3	–	5	5	–	7
Ball State	2	–	6	2	–	10
Eastern Michigan	0	–	8	0	–	12
Championship: Central Michigan 20, Ohio 10
$ – Conference champion; x – Division champion/co-champions; y – Championship game participant; Rankings from AP Poll

The 2009 Western Michigan Broncos football team represented Western Michigan University in the 2009 NCAA football season. The WMU football team was coached by Bill Cubit and played their home games in Waldo Stadium in Kalamazoo, Michigan. WMU finished the season 5–7, defeating fellow Mid-American Conference (MAC) members Buffalo, Eastern Michigan, Miami and Toledo, Football Championship Subdivision team Hofstra and losing to rival Central Michigan, Kent State, Northern Illinois, Ball State, Big Ten Conference members Indiana, Michigan and Michigan State.

Senior running back Brandon West set NCAA and MAC records for career all-purpose yards and career kick return yards during the week-four game against Hofstra. West passed Miami running back Travis Prentice for all-purpose yards (6,111) and Eastern Michigan's Trumaine Riley for kick return yards (2,541). West also currently holds the National Collegiate Athletic Association record for active career record holder for all-purpose yards, kick return yards and kick returns.

== Schedule ==
Date	Time	Opponent	Site	TV	Result	Attendance
September 5	3:30pm	at Michigan*	Michigan Stadium; Ann Arbor, MI	ABC/ESPN2	L 7–31	109,019
September 12	12:00pm	at Indiana*	Memorial Stadium; Bloomington, IN	BTN	L 19–23	35,162
September 19	7:00pm	Miami (OH)	Waldo Stadium; Kalamazoo, MI		W 48–26	24,372
September 26	7:00pm	Hofstra*	Waldo Stadium; Kalamazoo, MI		W 24–10	16,116
October 3	3:30pm	at Northern Illinois	Huskie Stadium; DeKalb, IL	CSNC	L 3–38	17,608
October 10	7:00pm	at Toledo	Glass Bowl; Toledo, OH		W 58–26	18,029
October 17	3:30pm	Central Michigan	Waldo Stadium; Kalamazoo, MI (Michigan MAC Trophy, WMU–CMU Rivalry Trophy)	FSD+	L 23–34	27,896
October 24	2:00pm	Buffalo^{†}	Waldo Stadium; Kalamazoo, MI		W 34–31 ^{OT}	12,924
October 31	2:00pm	at Kent State	Dix Stadium; Kent, OH		L 14–26	15,206
November 7	12:00pm	at Michigan State*	Spartan Stadium; East Lansing, MI	BTN	L 14–49	73,910
November 14	1:00pm	at Eastern Michigan	Rynearson Stadium; Ypsilanti, MI (Michigan MAC Trophy)		W 35–14	3,281
November 24	7:00pm	Ball State	Waldo Stadium; Kalamazoo, MI	ESPN2	L 17–22	20,344
*Non-conference game; ^{†}Homecoming; All times are in Eastern time

== Game summaries ==
=== Michigan ===
	1	2	3	4	Total
Western Michigan (0–1)	0	0	0	7	7
Michigan (1–0)	14	17	0	0	31

Michigan, 13 point favorites, scored 14 points in the first quarter and 17 in the second to lead 31–0 at halftime. WMU scored in the fourth quarter on a 73-yard touchdown pass from Tim Hiller to Juan Nunez to avoid the shutout. WMU outpassed Michigan 263 yards to 197, but only gained 38 yards on the ground.

Hiller finished the game 22 of 38 for 259 yards with one touchdown and two interceptions. WMU turned the ball over three times on the day, leading to seven Michigan points.

On defense, linebacker Austin Pritchard led the team with 13 tackles and a forced fumble.

Recap | Boxscore

=== Indiana ===
	1	2	3	4	Total
Western Michigan (0–2)	0	7	7	5	19
Indiana (2–0)	3	14	3	3	23

Recap | Boxscore

=== Miami ===
	1	2	3	4	Total
Miami (0–3)	0	0	12	14	26
Western Michigan (1–2)	14	14	20	0	48

Recap | Boxscore

=== Hofstra ===
	1	2	3	4	Total
Hofstra (2–2)	7	3	0	0	10
Western Michigan (2–2)	0	17	0	7	24

Recap | Boxscore

=== Northern Illinois ===
	1	2	3	4	Total
Western Michigan (2–3)	0	3	0	0	3
Northern Illinois (3–2)	7	14	10	7	38

Recap | Boxscore

=== Toledo ===
	1	2	3	4	Total
Western Michigan (3–3)	20	21	10	7	58
Toledo (3–3)	6	6	7	7	26

Recap | Boxscore

=== Central Michigan ===
	1	2	3	4	Total
Central Michigan (6–1)	10	17	0	7	34
Western Michigan (3–4)	3	10	3	7	23

Recap | Boxscore

=== Buffalo ===
	1	2	3	4	OT	Total
Buffalo (3–5)	7	0	14	10	0	31
Western Michigan (4–4)	14	3	7	7	3	34

Recap | Boxscore

=== Kent State ===
	1	2	3	4	Total
Western Michigan (4–5)	0	7	0	7	14
Kent State (5–4)	3	10	7	6	26

Recap | Boxscore

=== Michigan State ===
	1	2	3	4	Total
Western Michigan (4–6)	0	0	7	7	14
Michigan State (5–5)	21	14	0	14	49

Recap | Boxscore

=== Eastern Michigan ===
	1	2	3	4	Total
Western Michigan (5–6)	7	21	0	7	35
Eastern Michigan (0–10)	7	7	0	0	14

Recap | Boxscore

=== Ball State ===
	1	2	3	4	Total
Ball State (2–9)	6	7	3	6	22
Western Michigan (5–7)	0	10	0	7	17

Recap | Boxscore

== Awards ==
=== Mid-American Conference Player of the Week ===
- Jamail Berry, S
  - Week 3 (Defense) – Recovered a fumble for a touchdown, one interception and a blocked PAT in 48–26 win over Miami. On the game's first play from scrimmage, Berry recovered a fumble and returned it 24 yards for the opening score. He recorded his first career interception on Miami's third possession. Berry blocked the PAT attempt in the third quarter.
  - Week 11 (Defense) – Five tackles, career-high two interceptions and one recovered fumble in a 35–14 win at Eastern Michigan.
- Austin Pritchard, LB
  - Week 2 (Defense) – Blocked fourth quarter field goal, game-high 12 tackles.
  - Week 4 (Defense) – Recorded ten tackles, two tackles for loss and a sack in 24–10 win over Hofstra.
- Brandon West, RB / KR
  - Week 6 (Offense) – Rushed for 153 yards and three touchdowns. Also threw for a touchdown pass in a 58–26 win vs. Toledo. West finished the game with 236 all-purpose yards.
  - Week 8 (Special teams) – Gained 108 return yards, 282 all-purpose yards and two rushing touchdowns in 34–31 overtime win over Buffalo.
  - Week 10 (Special teams) – Recorded 142 kick return yards and 262 all-purpose yards in a 49–14 loss against Michigan State. During the game, West set the NCAA Division I FBS record for kick return yards in a career. West broke the record of 2,945 return yards set by Jessie Henderson of SMU.
  - Week 11 (Special teams) – Two kick returns for 43 yards and 183 all-purpose yards to set the NCAA Division I FBS record for career all-purpose yards in 35–14 win at Eastern Michigan.

=== Finalists ===
- Tim Hiller, QB – Wuerffel Trophy

=== Watch lists ===
- Ben Armer, P – Ray Guy Award
- Tim Hiller, QB – Davey O'Brien Award, Lowe's Senior CLASS Award, Manning Award, Walter Camp Award
- Austin Pritchard, LB – Lombardi Award
- Brandon West, RB – Doak Walker Award

== Coaching staff ==
- Bill Cubit – Head coach
- Steve Morrison – Defensive coordinator, linebackers
- Ryan Cubit – Quarterbacks
- Tim Daoust – Defensive secondary
- Mike Grant – Wide receivers
- Rick Kravitz – Safeties
- Peter McCarthy – Defensive line
- Jake Moreland – Tight ends
- Mike Sabock – Running backs, special teams
- Bob Stanley – Offensive line
- Tim Knox – Director of football operations
- Brent Bassham – Defensive graduate assistant
- Matt Ludeman – Offensive graduate assistant
