= 2009 Mid-American Conference football season =

- League: NCAA Division I FBS (Football Bowl Subdivision)
- Sport: football
- Duration: September 3, 2009 through January 7, 2010
- Teams: 13
- TV partner: ESPN

Regular season
- Season MVP: Dan LeFevour

MAC Championship Game

Football seasons
- 2008 2010

2009 Mid-American Conference football standings
	Conf.			Overall
Team	W		L	W		L
East Division
Ohio xy	7	–	1	9	–	5
Temple x	7	–	1	9	–	4
Bowling Green	6	–	2	7	–	6
Kent State	4	–	4	5	–	7
Buffalo	3	–	5	5	–	7
Akron	2	–	6	3	–	9
Miami (OH)	1	–	7	1	–	11
West Division
No. 23 Central Michigan x$	8	–	0	12	–	2
Northern Illinois	5	–	3	7	–	6
Western Michigan	4	–	4	5	–	7
Toledo	3	–	5	5	–	7
Ball State	2	–	6	2	–	10
Eastern Michigan	0	–	8	0	–	12
Championship: Central Michigan 20, Ohio 10
$ – Conference champion; x – Division champion/co-champions; y – Championship game participant; Rankings from AP Poll

The 2009 Mid-American Conference football season is an NCAA football season that was played from September 3, 2009, to January 7, 2010. The Mid-American Conference consists of twelve full-time members, with Temple University holding an affiliate membership for football.

== Preseason ==
=== Preseason poll ===
The 2009 MAC Preseason Poll was announced at the Football Media Preview in Detroit on July 31. In the East Division, Buffalo was selected to repeat as divisional champions, and Central Michigan selected to top the West. Also, Central Michigan received 18 votes to win the MAC Championship Game.

==== West Division ====
1. Central Michigan – 154 points
2. Western Michigan – 126 points
3. Northern Illinois – 103 points
4. Toledo – 71 points
5. Ball State – 58 points
6. Eastern Michigan – 34 points

==== East Division ====
1. Buffalo – 155 points
2. Temple – 144 points
3. Akron – 128 points
4. Ohio – 116 points
5. Bowling Green – 101 points
6. Kent State – 51 points
7. Miami – 33 points

==== MAC Championship ====
1. Central Michigan – 18 votes
2. Western Michigan – 4 votes
3. Buffalo – 2 votes
4. Temple – 2 votes

=== Award watch lists ===
Award	School	Player
Bronko Nagurski Trophy	Temple	Andre Neblett
Bronko Nagurski Trophy	Toledo	Barry Church
Dave Rimington Trophy	Bowling Green	Ben Bojicic
Dave Rimington Trophy	Central Michigan	Colin Miller
Dave Rimington Trophy	Northern Illinois	Eddie Adamski
Lombardi Award	Central Michigan	Nick Bellore
Lombardi Award	Central Michigan	Frank Zombo
Lombardi Award	Western Michigan	Austin Pritchard
Manning Award	Bowling Green	Tyler Sheehan
Manning Award	Central Michigan	Dan LeFevour
Manning Award	Western Michigan	Tim Hiller
Maxwell Award	Central Michigan	Dan LeFevour
Lou Groza Award	Northern Illinois	Mike Salerno
Lou Groza Award	Toledo	Alex Steigerwald
Outland Trophy	Temple	Andre Neblett
Fred Biletnikoff Award	Buffalo	Naaman Roosevelt
Fred Biletnikoff Award	Central Michigan	Antonio Brown
Fred Biletnikoff Award	Eastern Michigan	Jacory Stone
Fred Biletnikoff Award	Ohio	Taylor Price
Fred Biletnikoff Award	Toledo	Stephen Williams
Walter Camp Award	Ball State	MiQuale Lewis
Walter Camp Award	Western Michigan	Tim Hiller
Jim Thorpe Award	Toledo	Barry Church
Ted Hendricks Award	Central Michigan	Frank Zombo
Ray Guy Award	Western Michigan	Ben Armer
Doak Walker Award	Ball State	MiQuale Lewis
Doak Walker Award	Buffalo	James Starks
Doak Walker Award	Kent State	Eugene Jarvis
Doak Walker Award	Toledo	DeJuane Collins
Doak Walker Award	Western Michigan	Brandon West
Davey O'Brien Award	Central Michigan	Dan LeFevour
Davey O'Brien Award	Western Michigan	Tim Hiller

== Regular season ==
Index to colors and formatting
Mid-American Conference member won
Mid-American Conference member lost
Mid-American Conference teams in **bold**

=== Week one ===
Opening weekend for the Mid-American Conference consisted of six home games and six away games. Also, Miami faced Kentucky in a battle contested at Paul Brown Stadium in Cincinnati, Ohio. Bowling Green, Kent State, and Buffalo were the only teams to win the opening weekend. Buffalo was also the only team to win an away game as their season opener.

Date	Time	Visiting team	Home team	Site	TV	Result	Attendance
September 3	7 p.m.	Troy	**Bowling Green**	Doyt Perry Stadium • Bowling Green, OH		**W** 31–14	14,514
September 3	7 p.m.	Coastal Carolina	**Kent State**	Dix Stadium • Kent, OH		**W** 18–0	16,481
September 3	7 p.m.	Villanova	**Temple**	Lincoln Financial Field • Philadelphia, PA		**L** 24–27	27,759
September 3	7:30 p.m.	North Texas	**Ball State**	Scheumann Stadium • Muncie, IN	ESPNU	**L** 10–20	16,054
September 5	12 p.m.	**Toledo**	Purdue	Ross–Ade Stadium • West Lafayette, IN	Big Ten Network	**L** 31–51	47,551
September 5	12 p.m.	**Akron**	Penn State	Beaver Stadium • University Park, PA	Big Ten Network	**L** 7–31	104,968
September 5	12 p.m.	Kentucky	**Miami**	Paul Brown Stadium • Cincinnati, OH	ESPNU	**L** 0–42	41,037
September 5	3:30 p.m.	**Western Michigan**	Michigan	Michigan Stadium • Ann Arbor, MI	ABC/ESPN2	**L** 7–31	109,019
September 5	7 p.m.	Army	**Eastern Michigan**	Rynearson Stadium • Ypsilanti, MI		**L** 14–27	14,499
September 5	7 p.m.	**Northern Illinois**	Wisconsin	Camp Randall Stadium • Madison, WI	Big Ten Network	**L** 20–28	80,532
September 5	7 p.m.	Connecticut	**Ohio**	Peden Stadium • Athens, OH	ESPN360	**L** 16–23	24,617
September 5	9 p.m.	**Central Michigan**	Arizona	Arizona Stadium • Tucson, AZ		**L** 6–19	51,683
September 5	9 p.m.	**Buffalo**	UTEP	Sun Bowl Stadium • El Paso, TX		**W** 23–17	35,213

=== Week two ===
Date	Time	Visiting team	Home team	Site	TV	Result	Attendance
September 11	9 p.m.	Colorado	**Toledo**	Glass Bowl • Toledo, OH	ESPN	**W** 54–38	20,082
September 12	12 p.m.	Pittsburgh	**Buffalo**	UB Stadium • Amherst, NY	ESPN Plus	**L** 27–57	21,870
September 12	12 p.m.	**Western Michigan**	Indiana	Memorial Stadium • Bloomington, IN	Big Ten Network	**L** 19–23	35,162
September 12	12 p.m.	**Eastern Michigan**	Northwestern	Ryan Field • Evanston, IL	Big Ten Network	**L** 24–27	19,239
September 12	12 p.m.	**Central Michigan**	Michigan State	Spartan Stadium • East Lansing, MI	ESPN/ESPN2	**W** 29–27	76,221
September 12	2 p.m.	Morgan State	**Akron**	InfoCision Stadium–Summa Field • Akron, OH		**W** 41–0	27,881
September 12	2 p.m.	**Kent State**	Boston College	Alumni Stadium • Chestnut Hill, MA	ESPN360	**L** 7–34	25,165
September 12	7 p.m.	**Bowling Green**	Missouri	Faurot Field • Columbia, MO		**L** 20–27	65,401
September 12	7 p.m.	**Ohio**	North Texas	Fouts Field • Denton, TX		**W** 31–30^{2OT}	16,674
September 12	7 p.m.	New Hampshire	**Ball State**	Scheumann Stadium • Muncie, IN		**L** 16–23	11,884
September 12	7:30 p.m.	Western Illinois	**Northern Illinois**	Huskie Stadium • DeKalb, IL		**W** 41–7	21,427
September 12	8 p.m.	**Miami**	#12 Boise State	Bronco Stadium • Boise, ID		**L** 0–48	32,228

=== Week three ===
Date	Time	Visiting team	Home team	Site	TV	Result	Attendance
September 19	12 p.m.	**Northern Illinois**	Purdue	Ross–Ade Stadium • West Lafayette, IN	Big Ten Network	**W** 28–21	53,240
September 19	12 p.m.	**Temple**	Penn State	Beaver Stadium • University Park, PA	Big Ten Network	**L** 6–31	105,514
September 19	12 p.m.	**Ball State**	Army	Michie Stadium • West Point, NY		**L** 17–24	25,646
September 19	12 p.m.	Ohio State	**Toledo**	Cleveland Browns Stadium • Cleveland, OH	ESPN Plus	**L** 0–38	71,727
September 19	12 p.m.	**Eastern Michigan**	Michigan	Michigan Stadium • Ann Arbor, MI	Big Ten Network	**L** 17–45	107,903
September 19	3:30 p.m.	Alcorn State	**Central Michigan**	Kelly/Shorts Stadium • Mount Pleasant, MI		**W** 48–0	18,323
September 19	3:30 p.m.	Indiana	**Akron**	InfoCision Stadium–Summa Field • Akron, OH	ESPNU	**L** 38–21	18,340
September 19	7 p.m.	Iowa State	**Kent State**	Dix Stadium • Kent, OH	ESPN360	**L** 34–14	15,808
September 19	7 p.m.	Cal Poly	**Ohio**	Peden Stadium • Athens, OH		**W** 28–10	16,018
September 19	7 p.m.	**Bowling Green**	Marshall	Joan C. Edwards Stadium • Huntington, WV		**L** 17–10	23,029
September 19	7:30 p.m.	**Buffalo**	Central Florida	Bright House Networks Stadium • Orlando, FL		**L** 23–17	33,689

=== Week four ===
Date	Time	Visiting team	Home team	Site	TV	Result	Attendance
September 26	3:30 p.m.	Idaho	**Northern Illinois**	Huskie Stadium • DeKalb, IL	CSN Chicago	**L** 34–31	16,320
September 26	7 p.m.	Hofstra	**Western Michigan**	Waldo Stadium • Kalamazoo, MI	College Sports Direct	**W** 24–10	16,116
September 26	7 p.m.	Boise State	**Bowling Green**	Doyt Perry Stadium • Bowling Green, OH	KTVB, ESPN360	**L** 49–14	22,396
September 26	7 p.m.	**Toledo**	Florida International	FIU Stadium • Miami, FL	College Sports Direct	**W** 41–31	11,047
September 26	7 p.m.	**Ohio**	Tennessee	Neyland Stadium • Knoxville, TN	ESPN360	**L** 34–23	95,535
September 26	7 p.m.	**Ball State**	Auburn	Jordan–Hare Stadium • Auburn, AL	Fox Sports Net	**L** 54–30	83,118

=== Week five ===
Date	Time	Visiting team	Home team	Site	TV	Result	Attendance
October 3	1 p.m.	Cincinnati	**Miami**	Yager Stadium • Oxford, OH		**L** 37–13	23,493
October 3	7 p.m.	**Kent State**	Baylor	Floyd Casey Stadium • Waco, TX	Fox Sports Net	**L** 31–15	27,047

=== Week six ===
Date	Time	Visiting team	Home team	Site	TV	Result	Attendance
October 10	12 p.m.	**Miami**	Northwestern	Ryan Field • Evanston, IL	ESPN	**L** 6–16	23,085
October 10	3:30 p.m.	Gardner-Webb	**Buffalo**	UB Stadium • Amherst, NY		**W** 40–3	15,812

=== Week seven ===
Date	Time	Visiting team	Home team	Site	TV	Result	Attendance
October 17	1 p.m.	Army	**Temple**	Lincoln Financial Field • Philadelphia, PA		**W** 27–13	14,275

=== Week eight ===
Date	Time	Visiting team	Home team	Site	TV	Result	Attendance
October 24	3:30 p.m.	**Akron**	Syracuse	Carrier Dome • Syracuse, NY		**L** 28–14	36,991

=== Week nine ===
Date	Time	Visiting team	Home team	Site	TV	Result	Attendance
October 31	3:30 p.m.	**Temple**	Navy	Navy–Marine Corps Memorial Stadium • Annapolis, MD	CBS College Sports	**W** 27–24	28,305
October 31	3:30 p.m.	**Central Michigan**	Boston College	Alumni Stadium • Chestnut Hill, MA	ESPNU	**L** 31–10	34,128
October 31	7:00 p.m.	**Eastern Michigan**	Arkansas	Donald W. Reynolds Razorback Stadium • Fayetteville, AR	ESPNU	**L** 63–27	62,501

=== Week ten ===
Date	Time	Visiting team	Home team	Site	TV	Result	Attendance
November 7	12 p.m.	**Western Michigan**	Michigan State	Spartan Stadium • East Lansing, MI	Big Ten Network	**L** 49–14	73,910

=== Players of the Week ===
==== East Division ====
Week	Offensive		Defensive		Special teams	
Week	Player	Team	Player	Team	Player	Team
1	Freddie Barnes	Bowling Green	Cobrani Mixon	Kent State	Matt Weller	Ohio
2	Zach Maynard	Buffalo	Brian Wagner	Akron	Jerry Phillips	Bowling Green
3	Tyler Sheehan	Bowling Green	Brian Lainhart	Kent State	Brandon McManus	Temple
4	Theo Scott	Ohio	Elijah Joseph	Temple	Freddy Cortez	Kent State
5	Bernard Pierce	Temple	Dak Notestine	Ohio	Jerry Phillips	Bowling Green
6	Freddie Barnes	Bowling Green	Jaiquawn Jarret	Temple	Melvin Payne	Ohio
7	Tyler Sheehan	Bowling Green	Mike Newton	Buffalo	Chad Clemens	Ohio
8	Bernard Pierce	Temple	Kevin Hogan	Kent State	Dashan Miller	Akron
9	Bernard Pierce	Temple	Monte Simmons	Kent State	Matt Weller	Ohio
10	Tyler Sheehan	Bowling Green	Miguel Graham	Akron	Brandon McManus	Temple
11	Naaman Roosevelt	Buffalo	Jerett Sanderson	Bowling Green	Matt Weller	Ohio

==== West Division ====
Week	Offensive		Defensive		Special teams	
Week	Player	Team	Player	Team	Player	Team
1	Aaron Opelt	Toledo	Cory Hanson	Northern Illinois	Mike Salerno	Northern Illinois
2	Aaron Opelt	Toledo	Austin Pritchard	Western Michigan	Andrew Aguila	Central Michigan
3	Me'co Brown	Northern Illinois	Jamail Berry	Western Michigan	Antonio Brown	Central Michigan
4	Dan LeFevour	Central Michigan	Austin Pritchard	Western Michigan	Alex Steigerwald	Toledo
5	Stephen Williams	Toledo	Jake Coffman	Northern Illinois	Brett Hartmann	Central Michigan
6	Brandon West	Western Michigan	Nick Bellore	Central Michigan	Antonio Brown	Central Michigan
7	Dan LeFevour	Central Michigan	Brandon Bice	Northern Illinois	Barry Church	Toledo
8	MiQuale Lewis	Ball State	Larry Knight	Central Michigan	Brandon West	Western Michigan
9	Chad Spann	Northern Illinois	Justin Braska	Western Michigan	Mike Salerno	Northern Illinois
10	Chad Spann	Northern Illinois	Cory Hanson	Northern Illinois	Brandon West	Western Michigan
11	Dan LeFevour	Central Michigan	Jamail Berry	Western Michigan	Brandon West	Western Michigan

== Bowl games ==
Bowl Game	Date	Stadium	City	Television	Matchup/Results	Payout (US$)	Attendance
Little Caesars Pizza Bowl	December 26, 2009	Ford Field	Detroit, Michigan	ESPN	Marshall 21, Ohio 17	$750,000	30,311
EagleBank Bowl	December 29, 2009	RFK Stadium	Washington, D.C.	ESPN	UCLA 30, Temple 21	$1,000,000	23,072
Roady's Humanitarian Bowl	December 30, 2009	Bronco Stadium	Boise, Idaho	ESPN	Idaho 43, Bowling Green 42	$750,000	26,726
International Bowl	January 2, 2010	Rogers Centre	Toronto, Ontario	ESPN2	South Florida 27, Northern Illinois 3	$750,000	22,185
GMAC Bowl	January 6, 2010	Ladd–Peebles Stadium	Mobile, Alabama	ESPN	Central Michigan 44, Troy 41 (2OT)	$750,000	34,486

== 2009 MAC Specialty Award Winners ==
Vern Smith Leadership Award Winner: Dan LeFevour, Central Michigan
Coach of the Year: Al Golden, Temple
Offensive Player of the Year: Dan LeFevour, Central Michigan
Defensive Player of the Year: Adrian Robinson, Temple
Special Teams Player of the Year: Antonio Brown, Central Michigan
Freshman of the Year: Bernard Pierce, Temple

== All-Conference teams ==
2009 All-MAC First Team Offense
Quarterback – Dan LeFevour, Central Michigan
Center – Eddie Adamski, Northern Illinois
Offensive Lineman – Allen Ollenburger, Central Michigan
Offensive Linemen – Jason Onyebuagu, Northern Illinois
Offensive Linemen – Darius Morris, Temple
Offensive Lineman – Colin Madison, Temple
Tight End – Jesse Rack, Buffalo
Wide Receiver – Freddie Barnes, Bowling Green
Wide Receiver – Antonio Brown, Central Michigan
Wide Receiver – Naaman Roosevelt, Buffalo
Wide Receiver – Stephen Williams, Toledo
Running Back – Bernard Pierce, Temple
Running Back – Chad Spann, Northern Illinois
Placekicker – Matt Weller, Ohio

2009 All-MAC First Team Defense
Outside Linebacker – Lee Renfro, Ohio
Outside Linebacker – Elijah Joseph, Temple
Inside Linebacker – Nick Bellore, Central Michigan
Inside Linebacker – Cobrani Mixon, Kent State
Down Lineman – Andre Neblett, Temple
Down Lineman – Adrian Robinson, Temple
Down Lineman – Muhammad Wilkerson, Temple
Down Lineman – Frank Zombo, Central Michigan
Defensive Back – Barry Church, Toledo
Defensive Back – Davonte Shannon, Buffalo
Defensive Back – Jaiquawn Jarrett, Temple
Defensive Back – Brian Lainhart, Kent State
Punter – Matt Rinehart, Kent State

2009 All-MAC First Team Specialists
Kickoff Return Specialist – Chris Garrett, Ohio
Punt Return Specialist – Antonio Brown, Central Michigan

2009 All-MAC Second Team Offense
Quarterback – Tim Hiller, Western Michigan
Center – Colin Miller, Central Michigan
Offensive Lineman – Peter Bittner, Buffalo
Offensive Lineman – Brandon Brooks, Miami
Offensive Lineman – Anthony Parker, Western Michigan
Offensive Lineman – Devin Tyler, Temple
Tight End – Jimmy Scheidler, Bowling Green
Wide Receiver – Eric Page, Toledo
Wide Receiver – Bryan Anderson, Central Michigan
Wide Receiver – Taylor Price, Ohio
Wide Receiver – LaVon Brazill, Ohio
Running Back – Brandon West, Western Michigan
Running Back – MiQuale Lewis, Ball State
Placekicker – Mike Salerno, Northern Illinois

2009 All-MAC Second Team Defense
Outside Linebacker – Austin Pritchard, Western Michigan
Outside Linebacker – Robert Eddins, Ball State
Inside Linebacker – Brian Wagner, Akron
Inside Linebacker – Noah Keller, Ohio
Down Lineman – Brandon Crawford, Ball State
Down Lineman – Jake Coffman, Northern Illinois
Down Lineman – Monte Simmons, Kent State
Down Lineman – Brandon Bice, Northern Illinois
Defensive Back – Mike Newton, Buffalo
Defensive Back – Thad Turner, Ohio
Defensive Back – Josh Gordy, Central Michigan
Defensive Back – Miguel Graham, Akron
Punter – Zach Johnson, Eastern Michigan

2009 All-MAC Second Team Specialists
Kickoff Return Specialist – James Nixon, Temple
Punt Return Specialist – LaVon Brazill, Ohio

2009 All-MAC Third Team Offense
Quarterback – Tyler Sheehan, Bowling Green
Center – John Palumbo, Temple
Offensive Lineman – Joe Flading, Ohio
Offensive Lineman – Shane Steffy, Bowling Green
Offensive Lineman – Chris Rodgers, Ohio
Offensive Lineman – Corey Woods, Akron
Tight End – Steve Maneri, Temple
Wide Receiver – Robert Arnheim, Western Michigan
Wide Receiver – Juan Nunez, Western Michigan
Wide Receiver – Armand Robinson, Miami
Wide Receiver – Brett Hamlin, Buffalo
Running Back – DaJuane Collins, Toledo
Running Back – Me'co Brown, Northern Illinois
Placekicker – Alex Steigerwald, Toledo

2009 All-MAC Third Team Defense
Outside Linebacker – Andre Hatchett, Eastern Michigan
Outside Linebacker – Amara Kamara, Temple
Inside Linebacker – Alex Joseph, Temple
Inside Linebacker – Archie Donald, Toledo
Down Lineman – Almondo Sewell, Akron
Down Lineman – Ernie Hodge, Ohio
Down Lineman – Larry Knight, Central Michigan
Down Lineman – Sean Murnane, Central Michigan
Defensive Back – Gerald Moore, Ohio
Defensive Back – Dominique Harris, Temple
Defensive Back – Anthony Kokal, Miami
Defensive Back – Jalil Carter, Akron
Punter – Ben Armer, Western Michigan

2009 All-MAC Third Team Specialists
Kickoff Return Specialist – Dashan Miller, Akron
Punt Return Specialist – Tommy Davis, Northern Illinois
