= Monte Simmons =

American football player (born 1989)

No. 47
- Position: Linebacker

Personal information
- Born: January 29, 1989 (age 37); Swissvale, Pennsylvania, U.S.
- Listed height: 6 ft 3 in (1.91 m)
- Listed weight: 248 lb (112 kg)

Career information
- High school: Pittsburgh (PA) Woodland Hills
- College: Kent State
- NFL draft: 2011: undrafted

Career history
- San Francisco 49ers (2011)*; Philadelphia Eagles (2012)*; Indianapolis Colts (2012−2013)*
- * Offseason or practice squad member only

Awards and highlights
- Second-team All-MAC (2009)
- Stats at Pro Football Reference

Monte Simmons (born January 29, 1989) is an American former professional football linebacker of the National Football League (NFL). He played college football at Kent State. He was signed by the San Francisco 49ers as an undrafted free agent in 2011. He was waived by the Indianapolis Colts on August 5, 2013.

== Professional career ==
=== San Francisco 49ers ===
On July 29, 2011, the San Francisco 49ers signed Simmons as an undrafted free agent. He was waived on September 3, 2011. On the next day, he cleared waivers and was signed to the 49ers' practice squad.

=== Philadelphia Eagles ===
Simmons was signed by the Philadelphia Eagles on March 5, 2012. He was waived by the Philadelphia Eagles on August 30, 2012.

=== Indianapolis Colts ===
On October 23, 2012, Simmons was signed by the Indianapolis Colts and placed on the practice squad. He was signed by the Colts to a reserve/future contract on January 7, 2013. On August 5, 2013, he was waived by the Colts. On August 13, 2013, he was re-signed by the Colts.
