= Robert Eddins =

American gridiron football player (1988–2016)

No. 48
- Position: Linebacker

Personal information
- Born: October 11, 1988; Detroit, Michigan, U.S.
- Died: December 20, 2016 (aged 28); Detroit, Michigan, U.S.
- Listed height: 6 ft 3 in (1.91 m)
- Listed weight: 246 lb (112 kg)

Career information
- High school: Crockett (Detroit, Michigan)
- College: Ball State
- NFL draft: 2011: undrafted

Career history
- Buffalo Bills (2011); Saskatchewan Roughriders (2014)*
- * Offseason or practice squad member only

Awards and highlights
- Second-team All-MAC (2009)
- Stats at Pro Football Reference

Robert Eddins (October 11, 1988 – December 20, 2016) was an American football linebacker. He was signed by the Buffalo Bills as an undrafted free agent in 2011 after playing college football for Ball State University.

== Early life ==
Eddins graduated from Crockett High School in Detroit, playing under coach Rod Oden.

== Professional career ==
=== Buffalo Bills ===
After going undrafted in the 2011 NFL draft, Eddins signed as a free agent with the Buffalo Bills. He was placed on the injured reserve list on September 14, and waived with an injury settlement on September 20. He was signed by the Bills to their practice squad on November 30.

On January 6, 2012, Eddins was again signed by the Buffalo Bills. While making a rise up the depth chart in that summer's training camp, on August 21 in the Rochester newspaper Democrat and Chronicle, Eddins was quoted as saying "Being inconsistent makes you non-existent". In total Eddins played in one regular season game during the 2011 season and four preseason games. He played in four preseason games in 2012.

=== Canadian Football League ===
After his NFL career Eddins went to Canada and joined the Saskatchewan Roughriders during the 2014 CFL preseason. During training camp he injured his hamstring. He was cut on June 22, 2014.

== Death ==
Eddins was found dead on December 20, 2016, in Detroit, Michigan while police were investigating a double homicide. On February 22, 2018, the FBI announced that 3 drug dealers had been arrested for Eddins' murder, about 1 1/2 years later.

== See also ==
- List of homicides in Michigan
