= Tim Hiller =

American football player and coach (born 1986)

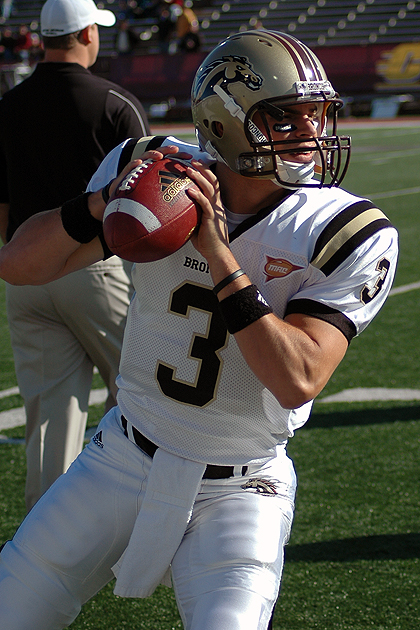
- Hiller during his time at Western Michigan University

No. 3
- Position: Quarterback

Personal information
- Born: December 13, 1986 (age 39); Parma, Ohio, U.S.
- Listed height: 6 ft 4 in (1.93 m)
- Listed weight: 229 lb (104 kg)

Career information
- High school: Orrville (Orrville, Ohio)
- College: Western Michigan
- NFL draft: 2010: undrafted

Career history
- Indianapolis Colts (2010)*
- * Offseason or practice squad member only

Awards and highlights
- Wuerffel Trophy (2009); MAC Freshman of the Year (2005); Second-team All-MAC (2009); John S. Pingel Award (2009)

Tim Hiller (born December 13, 1986) is an American former professional football quarterback. He played college football for the Western Michigan Broncos. He was signed by the Indianapolis Colts as an undrafted free agent in 2010. After his playing days, Hiller worked as head football coach at Gull Lake High School in Richland, Michigan.

== Early life ==
Hiller threw for 7,222 career yards and 55 touchdowns. He holds six school passing records as quarterback at Orrville High School in Orrville, Ohio. He was named Akron Beacon Journal Player of the Year.

== College career ==
=== 2005 season ===
Hiller appeared in seven games as a true freshman and was named MAC Freshman of the Year. He made his first collegiate start at Bowling Green and threw three TD passes. He also threw a career-long 89-yard touchdown pass to Greg Jennings against Bowling Green.

=== 2006 season ===
Hiller spent the year redshirted due to an injury.

=== 2007 season ===
Hiller started all 12 games and became the second Bronco quarterback to throw for over 3,000 yards in a single season. He became the fourth Bronco quarterback to throw over 40 touchdowns in his career, and he finished the years with a 63.4 completion percentage. He also booted his first career punt for 14 yards. Hiller was also named Academic All-MAC.

=== 2008 season ===
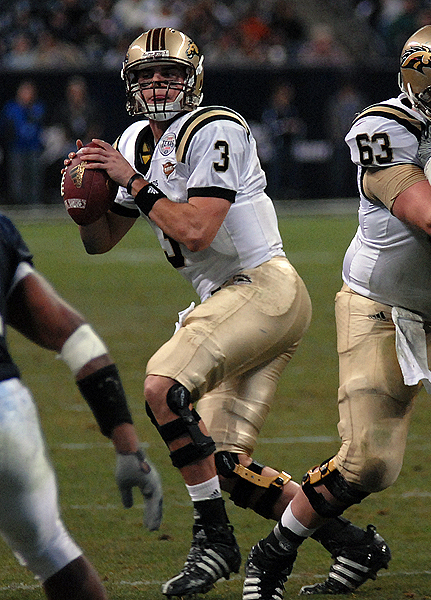
Hiller during the 2008 Texas Bowl

Hiller caught national attention in his junior season. He broke WMU single-season records for passing attempts (522), completions (339), yards (3,725) and touchdowns (36). Hiller also led the MAC in five of six major passing categories (attempts, completions, yards, yards per game, and touchdowns) He became just the second Bronco to throw for over 3,000 yards in a season twice in a career. He threw for multiple touchdowns in all but two games and threw for over 300 yards in seven games. Hiller also set the record for passing yardage (471) at Kelly/Shorts Stadium in a 38–28 loss to Central Michigan on October 18, 2008. He also threw two touchdown passes in the 2008 Texas Bowl loss to Rice.

=== 2009 season ===
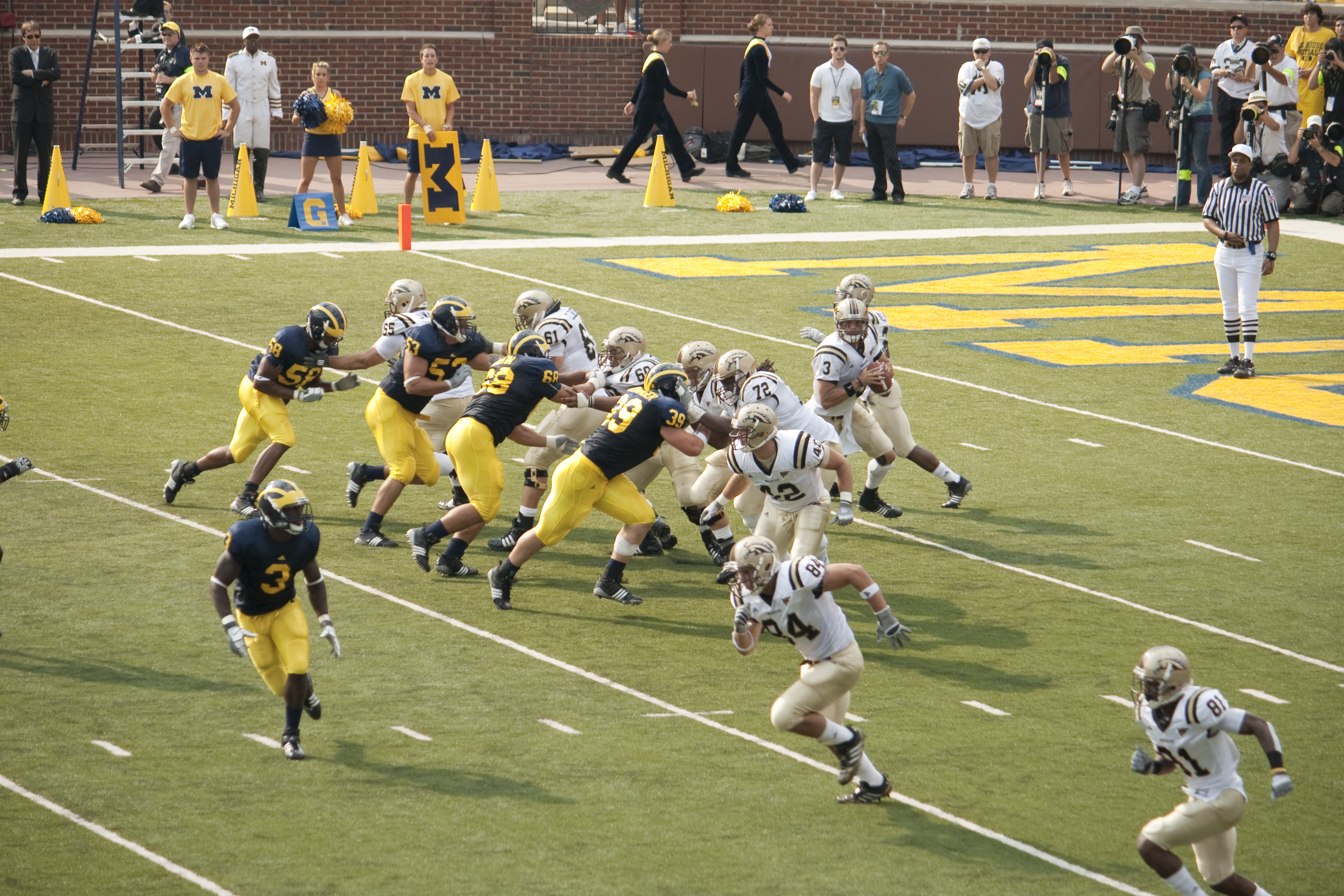
Hiller rolls out against Michigan while Stevie Brown drops back in coverage.

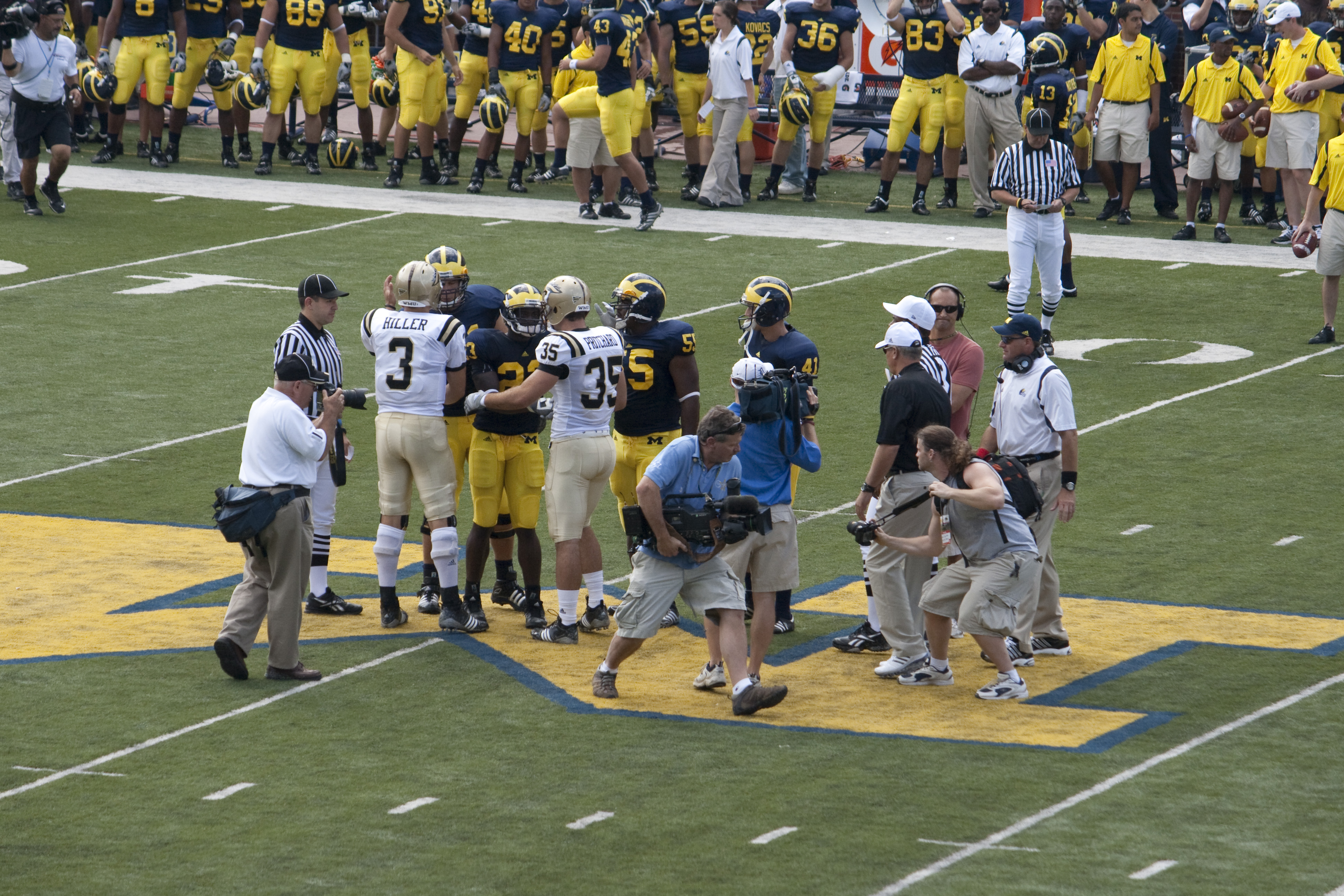
Hiller during pregame coin toss with opponents Carlos Brown, Brandon Graham, Zoltan Mesko and Mark Ortmann.

Hiller threw for 3,249 yards and 23 touchdowns and finished the year with a passer efficiency rating of 122.9 as the Broncos struggled at times during the year and finished 5–7, including blow-out losses to Michigan and Michigan State. Hiller was 40-of-66 passing for 410 yards on October 17 against rival Central Michigan, but the Broncos could not keep pace with the Chippewas, falling, 34–23. Hiller's last game in Waldo Stadium against Ball State on November 24 was unceremoniously marked by four interceptions as the Broncos lost, 22–17, to the Cardinals, despite Hiller completing 33-of-62 passes for 354 yards and a score. Prior to start of 2009 season, in June 2009, Hiller was #5 on list of top senior college quarterback prospects by NFL.com. Hiller was also named to the 2009 Manning Award watchlist.

At the conclusion of the season, Hiller received the Wuerffel Trophy and the John S. Pingel Award as the Michigan Division I college scholar-athlete of the year. He was also a finalist for the William V. Campbell Trophy.

== Professional career ==
Hiller trained for the 2010 NFL Combine at The Home Depot Center in Carson, California. He signed a contract with the Indianapolis Colts as an undrafted-rookie, 12 hours after the draft. Hiller played in one preseason game before being waived by the Colts on August 23, 2010.

== Coaching career ==
Having a shortage of coaches in the fall of 2010, Tim Hiller agreed to coach at Vicksburg High School alongside former teammate Scott Gajos, a former physical education intern at Vicksburg Community High School. With Hiller filling the role of a quarterback coach, helped the Bulldogs secure playoff rights for the first time in 17 years. After a single year Tim decided to rise from an assistant coach to new Head coach at Gull Lake High School

Former Gull Lake High School coach Mark Blaesser was fired on November 22, 2010 and he went 34–23 in six seasons. Hiller was announced as the new varsity football coach at Gull Lake High School on February 1, 2011 and will patrol the sidelines in the fall.
