= Louis Delmas =

Haitian gridiron football player (born 1987)

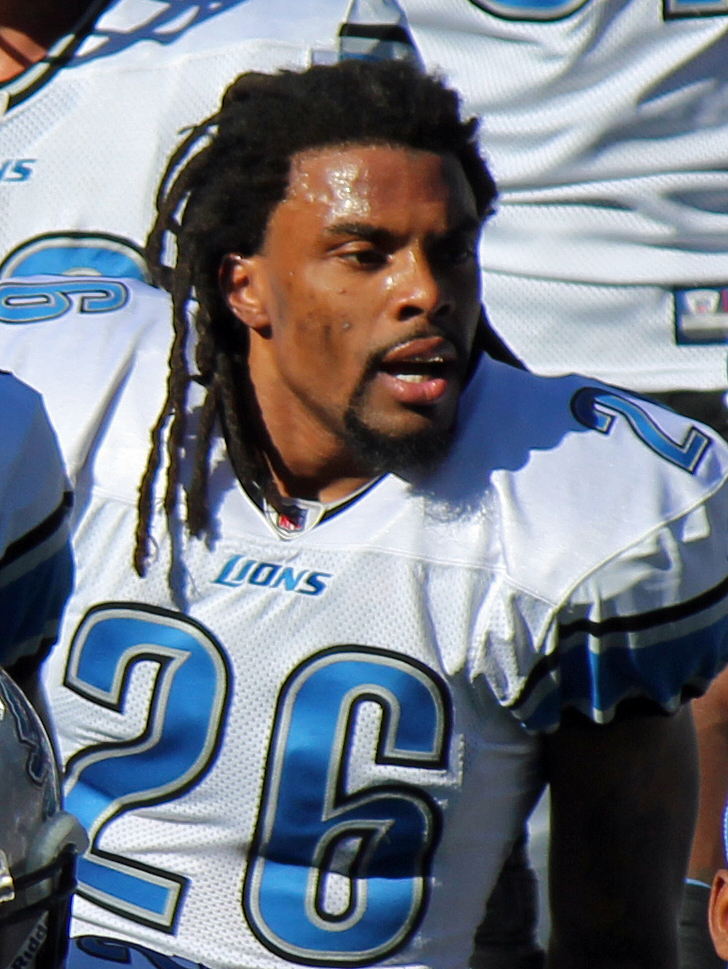
- Delmas with the Detroit Lions in 2011

No. 26, 25
- Position: Safety

Personal information
- Born: April 12, 1987 (age 39); Delmas, Haiti
- Listed height: 5 ft 11 in (1.80 m)
- Listed weight: 208 lb (94 kg)

Career information
- High school: North Miami Beach (North Miami Beach, Florida, U.S.)
- College: Western Michigan (2005–2008)
- NFL draft: 2009: 2nd round, 33rd overall pick

Career history
- Detroit Lions (2009–2013); Miami Dolphins (2014–2015)

Awards and highlights
- First-team All-MAC (2008); Second-team All-MAC (2007); PFWA All-Rookie Team (2009)

Career NFL statistics
- Total tackles: 392
- Sacks: 6.0
- Forced fumbles: 2
- Fumble recoveries: 6
- Interceptions: 7
- Defensive touchdowns: 3
- Stats at Pro Football Reference

Louis Delmas (French pronunciation: [lwi dɛl.ma]; born April 12, 1987) is a Haitian-born former professional American football safety. He was selected by the Detroit Lions in the second round of the 2009 NFL draft. He played college football at Western Michigan. He was also a member of the Miami Dolphins.

== Early life ==
Delmas is of Haitian descent. He was born in Delmas, a commune in the Port-au-Prince area in Haiti, on a street named Delmas 25 and moved to Miami, Florida at age 11. When he first arrived he did not speak any English.

Delmas played high school football at North Miami Beach High School in North Miami Beach, Florida.

== College career ==
Delmas played college football at Western Michigan from 2005 to 2008. The Broncos made the 2008 Texas Bowl in his senior year but lost to Rice 38–14. Delmas was named to the All-MAC Defensive First-team in 2008 and played in the 2009 Senior Bowl All-Star game.

== Professional career ==
=== Pre-draft ===
Delmas was considered by some to be a top-10 prospect at his position in the 2009 NFL draft. In 2008, ESPN's Todd McShay said Delmas had a chance to get drafted in the first three rounds.

Pre-draft measurables
Height	Weight	Arm length	Hand span	40-yard dash	10-yard split	20-yard split	20-yard shuttle	Three-cone drill	Vertical jump	Broad jump	Bench press
5 ft 11 3/8 in (1.81 m)	202 lb (92 kg)	31 3/4 in (0.81 m)	9 1/4 in (0.23 m)	4.56 s	1.56 s	2.63 s	4.17 s	6.67 s	37 in (0.94 m)	10 ft 6 in (3.20 m)	12 reps
All values from NFL Combine

=== Detroit Lions ===
The Detroit Lions selected Delmas in the second round (33rd overall) of the 2009 NFL Draft. He was the first safety drafted in 2009.

He was signed by the Lions to a four-year contract. Delmas returned a 65-yard fumble for a touchdown in Week 1 of the 2009 season against the New Orleans Saints. Delmas won September's rookie defensive player of the month award. On December 20, 2009, Delmas became the first rookie in NFL history to record an interception return for a touchdown, a fumble return for a touchdown and a safety in the same season. He is only the second player in NFL history to accomplish the feats in the same season. He was named 2009 Detroit Lions Rookie of the Year in voting by the Detroit Sports Broadcasters Association.

Delmas was named a Pro Bowl alternate for the NFC after the 2010 NFL season.

Delmas was named a Pro Bowl alternate for the NFC after the 2011 NFL season, despite missing five games to injuries.

On March 15, 2013, Delmas re-signed with the Lions to a two-year contract worth $9.465 million.

On October 6, 2013, Lions' center Dominic Raiola was involved in an incident of trash-talking and hate speech to members of the UW-Madison marching band. Delmas was credited with both apologizing for his teammate's actions and having a word with Raiola off the field.

Delmas was released on February 13, 2014.

=== Miami Dolphins ===
On March 10, 2014, Delmas signed a one-year deal with the Miami Dolphins. The contract is worth a maximum of $3.5 million. He wore number 25, honoring the street name he was born on in Haiti. On December 8, 2014, he was placed on Injured reserve after he tore his right ACL against the Baltimore Ravens.

He was resigned by the Dolphins on March 20, 2015.

=== NFL statistics ===
Year	Team	GP	COMB	TOTAL	AST	SACK	FF	FR	FR YDS	INT	IR YDS	AVG IR	LNG	TD	PD
2009	DET	15	94	65	29	1.0	0	1	65	2	130	65	101	1	8
2010	DET	15	84	62	22	2.0	2	2	-4	0	0	0	0	0	1
2011	DET	11	51	36	15	0.0	0	1	0	0	0	0	0	0	5
2012	DET	8	38	28	10	0.0	0	0	0	1	0	0	0	0	2
2013	DET	16	64	48	16	2.0	0	0	0	3	44	15	42	0	8
2014	MIA	13	61	50	11	1.0	0	2	0	1	81	81	81	1	3
Career		78	392	289	103	6.0	2	6	0	7	255	36	101	2	27

== Personal life ==
On April 4, 2017, it was reported that Delmas had been arrested by the Miami-Dade Police for resisting arrest without violence. Delmas was a passenger in a vehicle that was pulled over for speeding 76 MPH in a 40 MPH speed limit zone. The driver, Andry Madrigal, was suspected of driving under the influence and failed sobriety test on the scene. A breath sample that was subsequently taken at the station measured 0.164, which is twice the legal 0.08 limit. Delmas continued to yell while the police officers conducted the field sobriety tests and was arrested after ignoring multiple requests. He was processed at the Miami-Dade Police station before posting a $500 bond.
