= Bill Cubit =

American football player and coach (born 1953)

Biographical details
- Born: October 14, 1953 (age 73); Sharon Hill, Pennsylvania, U.S.

Playing career
- 1971–1974: Delaware
- Position: Wide receiver

Coaching career (HC unless noted)
- 1975–1976: Swarthmore (RB/WR)
- 1977–1982: Sharon Hill HS (PA)
- 1983–1984: UCF (DB)
- 1985: UCF (AHC/DB)
- 1986–1988: Martin County HS (FL)
- 1989: Florida (QB)
- 1990–1991: Akron (RB)
- 1992–1996: Widener
- 1997–1999: Western Michigan (OC/QB)
- 2000: Missouri (OC/QB)
- 2001–2002: Rutgers (OC/QB)
- 2003–2004: Stanford (OC/QB)
- 2005–2012: Western Michigan
- 2013–2014: Illinois (OC/QB)
- 2015: Illinois
- 2017: Martin County HS (FL)
- 2019: Delaware (AHC/RB)

Head coaching record
- Overall: 90–72–1 (college)
- Bowls: 0–3
- Tournaments: 1–2 (NCAA D-III playoffs)

Accomplishments and honors

Championships
- 2 MAC Commonwealth (1994, 1995)

Awards
- MAC Coach of the Year (2005)

William John Cubit (/ˈkjuːbɪt/; born October 14, 1953) is an American football coach and former player. Cubit was the head football coach at the University of Illinois Urbana–Champaign, first on an interim basis in the 2015 season and then promoted to the post full-time before his dismissal on March 5, 2016. Cubit served as the head football coach at Widener University from 1992 to 1996, and Western Michigan University from 2005 to 2012. Most recently, in 2019, he served as assistant head coach and running backs coach at his alma mater, the University of Delaware.

== Early life and playing career ==
Cubit attended Sharon Hill High School in Sharon Hill, Pennsylvania. A three-sport "sensation", he played football, basketball and baseball in high school. Described as a scrambling quarterback, Cubit was a three-year starter at quarterback and finished his career with 96 pass completions for 1,746 yards and 20 touchdowns. He had five rushing touchdowns and 2,010 yards of total offense. Cubit also intercepted 17 passes in his career on defense, including six in one game (four in one quarter). He was named All-Delco defensive back is his senior season. Cubit was also named to the Blue Cross All-Scholastic football team his senior year and was named Delaware County Player of the Year.

Cubit won a basketball game in 1968 after making two free throws with one second left in the game 62–61. He was named all-Delco honorable mention in 1969 and 1970. He was named first team All-Delco his senior year. Cubit finished his career with 1,114 points.

In his baseball career, he was a pitcher and center fielder. He threw a no-hitter his junior year. He had a 7–0 win–loss record, a 0.32 earned run average and a .476 batting average in his senior season, helping Sharon Hill to a Section Three championship.

Cubit accepted a scholarship from the University of Delaware over offers from Temple and Drexel. He graduated from Delaware in 1973 with a B.S. in business, and later earned his M.A. in education in 1979 from Saint Joseph's University. While at Delaware, Cubit played wide receiver and quarterback for the Blue Hens football team under head coach Tubby Raymond, earning Associated Press All-America honorable mention in 1974. He set school records for catches in a game (10) and a season (47), along with receiving yards in a season (787).

Cubit's playing career ended with the 1974 NCAA Division II Football Championship game as the Blue Hens fell to the Central Michigan Chippewas by a score of 54–14.

== Early coaching career ==
Cubit got his coaching start in 1975, serving two years as the offensive backfield coach at Swarthmore College.

As a high school coach, Cubit compiled a nine-year record of 79–15–2 at three different programs, Martin County, Academy Park and his alma mater Sharon Hill.

Cubit was head coach at NCAA Division III Widener University in Chester, Pennsylvania from 1992 to 1996. He led the Pioneers to a 34–18–1 record.

Cubit was previously the offensive coordinator for the Broncos under head coach Gary Darnell from 1997 to 1999. The two had also worked together on the staff of Galen Hall at the University of Florida in 1989. Cubit has spent time as the offensive coordinator at Stanford University, and the University of Missouri. In 2001, he was the first offensive coordinator hired by new head coach Greg Schiano at Rutgers University.

== Head coaching career ==
=== Western Michigan ===
Cubit was named head football coach at Western Michigan on December 4, 2004, succeeding Gary Darnell. Cubit was among a group of finalists for the job that included Notre Dame defensive line coach Greg Mattison (a former WMU assistant); Edinboro head coach Lou Tepper (a former head coach at Illinois); and Cornell head coach Jim Knowles (a former WMU assistant). In his first season, Cubit turned around a program that was 1–10 the prior season and had had three losing consecutive seasons to a 7–4 record, the biggest single-season turnaround in Mid-American Conference (MAC) history and the second largest of the 2005 NCAA Division I-A football season. For his efforts, Cubit was named the 2005 MAC Coach of the Year.

Cubit led Western Michigan to the International Bowl following the 2006 season. This was the first bowl game for Western Michigan since 1988, when the team played in the California Raisin Bowl. The Broncos fell to Cincinnati, 27–24. Cincinnati was led to victory by new head coach Brian Kelly, who had also beaten the Broncos earlier in the season while he was head coach at Central Michigan.

After a nine-win season in 2008, Cubit lead Western Michigan to the Texas Bowl against Rice, where the Broncos lost, 38–14. The nine wins tied a school record for victories in a season, which had also been accomplished in 1988 and 2000.

Following the 2011 season, the Cubit and Broncos participated in the 2011 Little Caesars Pizza Bowl, where they fell to Purdue in the final minutes by a score of 37–32.

During the course of his career at Western, Cubit has led the Broncos to upset road victories over Automatic Qualifying conference opponents Virginia (2006), Iowa (2007), Illinois (2008), and Connecticut (2011). The Iowa victory was of particular note, as Iowa entered the game with a season record of 6–5, and a 32–6 record in their previous five seasons at Kinnick Stadium. The Daily Iowan proclaimed it the worst loss of the Kirk Ferentz era. The win made Western Michigan 2–0 all-time against Iowa, having previously upset the Hawkeyes at Kinnick Stadium in 2000. Western Michigan concluded the 2007 season with a victory at home against Temple, then carried that momentum to a program-best 9–4 record in 2008.

Cubit's contract at WMU paid $377,250 per year, with possible bonuses of $251,500.

Western Michigan fired Cubit on November 17, 2012, following a season-ending loss to Eastern Michigan. WMU finished the year 4–8, its worst record since 2004. Cubit's final overall record at WMU was 51–47, with a conference record of 36–27, and a 0–3 bowl record. The three bowl game appearances under Cubit were more than the two total bowl game appearances made in the history of the program prior to his arrival.

=== Illinois ===
On December 13, 2012, Cubit was publicly named as one of three finalists for the head coaching position at Western Illinois University, a FCS program in Macomb, Illinois. On December 17, 2012, Western Illinois publicly acknowledged that Cubit had voluntarily withdrawn his name from consideration. The job eventually went to Minnesota-Duluth head coach Bob Nielson.

On January 14, 2013, Cubit was hired by the University of Illinois as the team's offensive coordinator and quarterbacks coach, replacing co-coordinators Chris Beatty and Billy Gonzales. Cubit's initial salary was approximately $400,000 per year. Cubit oversaw a dramatic improvement with Illinois' offense in his first year on Tim Beckman's staff. The Illini improved from 119th nationally in both yards and points to 52nd in yards and 61st in points. Quarterback Nathan Scheelhaase led the Big Ten in passing (3,272 yards), running back Josh Ferguson had a breakout season, and Illinois finished 22nd nationally in pass offense with 64 plays of 20 yards or longer. After the successful first season running the Illini offense, Cubit received an extension to 2015 and an increase in salary to $500,000 per year, making him the fourth highest-paid offensive coordinator in the Big Ten.

On August 28, 2015, Cubit was named interim head coach at Illinois for the 2015 season after the university fired Tim Beckman for alleged mistreatment of players. On November 28, 2015, Illinois removed the interim tag and named Cubit as its 24th head coach, giving him a two-year, $2.4 million contract. However, on March 5, 2016, the school announced that Cubit had been relieved of his duties. Illinois director of athletics Josh Whitman stated, "I appreciate the leadership that Bill Cubit provided our football program during what has been, unquestionably, a very tumultuous time...Through his efforts, he has kept the program moving forward. Bill is a good man and a good football coach...At this juncture, however, I think it is most important that we position our program for long-term success by creating a more stable environment for the coaches, players, and prospective student-athletes." He was replaced by former Chicago Bears and Tampa Bay Buccaneers head coach, Lovie Smith.

== Later career ==
=== Martin County High School ===
In 2017, Cubit returned to Martin County High School in Stuart, Florida to serve as the head football coach, reprising a role he held for three seasons between 1986 and 1988. He led the team to a 4–5 record before stepping down after just one season.

=== Delaware ===
In December 2018, it was announced that Cubit would be joining the coaching staff of his alma mater, the University of Delaware, as an assistant head coach and the running backs coach. On January 16, 2020, Cubit stepped down after just one season, in which the team finished 5–7.

== Family ==
Cubit's son, Ryan, was a three-year starter at quarterback for the Western Michigan football team from 2004 to 2006. Ryan had originally played quarterback at Rutgers (where his father was offensive coordinator), from 2001 to 2002 before transferring. Following a brief playing career in the Canadian Football League, Ryan served as quarterbacks coach and passing game coordinator on his father's Western Michigan coaching staff from 2009 to 2012. He also participated in off-season activities with the Michigan squad of the proposed All American Football League, although the league folded before any games were played. Ryan was dismissed along with the rest of the assistant coaches after his father's firing in 2012. He was out of coaching in 2013, and worked in the private sector with Stryker. In March 2014, Ryan joined his father on the Illinois staff as the director of football student-athlete development. In April 2015, Ryan was promoted to quarterbacks coach and recruiting coordinator on the Illini staff.

Cubit's brother, Mark Cubit, played basketball at Syracuse under Jim Boeheim and was a longtime high school basketball head coach at Mercersburg Academy.

In addition to Ryan, Cubit and his wife Nancy have two daughters, Stacey and Sheri, and four grandchildren.

== Head coaching record ==
=== College ===
Year	Team	Overall	Conference	Standing	Bowl/playoffs
Widener Pioneers (MAC Commonwealth Conference) (1992–1996)
1992	Widener	3–6–1	3–4–1	T–5th	
1993	Widener	6–4	2–2	T–2nd (Commonwealth)	
1994	Widener	10–2	5–0	1st (Commonwealth)	L NCAA Division III Second Round
1995	Widener	8–3	5–0	1st (Commonwealth)	L NCAA Division III First Round
1996	Widener	7–3	4–1	2nd (Commonwealth)	
Widener:		34–18–1	19–7–1		
Western Michigan Broncos (Mid-American Conference) (2005–2012)
2005	Western Michigan	7–4	5–3	3rd (West)	
2006	Western Michigan	8–5	6–2	2nd (West)	L International
2007	Western Michigan	5–7	3–4	4th (West)	
2008	Western Michigan	9–4	6–2	T–2nd (West)	L Texas
2009	Western Michigan	5–7	4–4	3rd (West)	
2010	Western Michigan	6–6	5–3	3rd (West)	
2011	Western Michigan	7–6	5–3	3rd (West)	L Little Caesars Pizza
2012	Western Michigan	4–8	2–6	5th (West)	
Western Michigan:		51–47	36–27		
Illinois Fighting Illini (Big Ten Conference) (2015)
2015	Illinois	5–7	2–6	T–5th (West)	
Illinois:		5–7	2–6		
Total:		90–72–1			
National championship Conference title Conference division title or championship game berth
