= 2008–09 Mid-American Conference season =

Mid-American Conference
- Conference: NCAA
- Founded: 1946
- Commissioner: Rick Chryst (since 1999)
- Sports fielded: 23; men's: 11; women's: 12
- Division: Division I
- Subdivision: FBS
- No. of teams: 12
- Headquarters: Cleveland, Ohio
- Region: Great Lakes
- Official website: https://www.mac-sports.com/

Locations
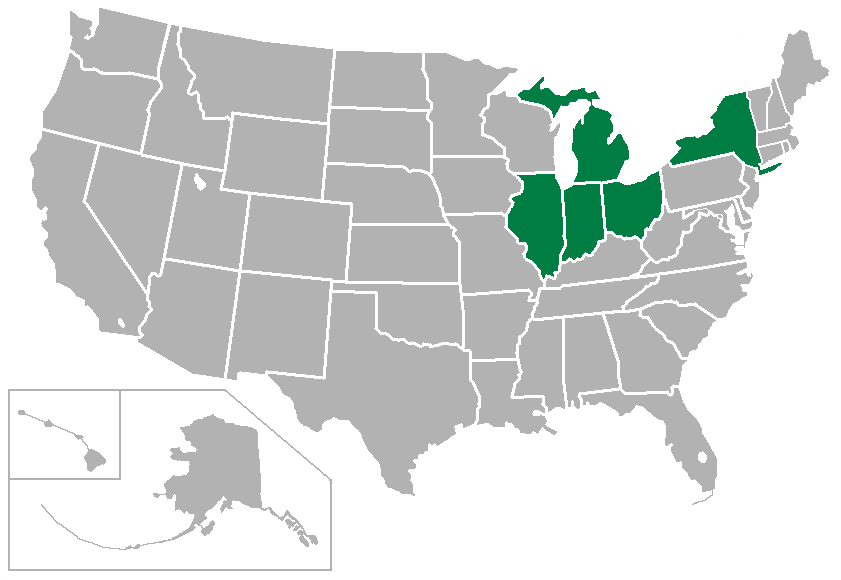

The 2008–09 Mid-American Conference season is a National Collegiate Athletic Association Division I conference. The Mid-American Conference (MAC) sponsors 23 sports (11 men's and 12 women's). The MAC is made up of 12 full-time members and five affiliate members.

The 2008–09 season is the 63rd season in existence.

== Member schools ==
There are twelve schools with full membership:

Institution	Nickname	Location	Founded	Affiliation	Enrollment
East Division
University of Akron	Zips	Akron, Ohio	1870	Public	24,704
Bowling Green State University	Falcons	Bowling Green, Ohio	1910	Public	22,882
University at Buffalo	Bulls	Buffalo, New York	1846	Public	28,054
Kent State University	Golden Flashes	Kent, Ohio	1910	Public	22,352
Miami University	RedHawks	Oxford, Ohio	1809	Public	20,126
Ohio University	Bobcats	Athens, Ohio	1804	Public	20,437
West Division
Ball State University	Cardinals	Muncie, Indiana	1918	Public	20,113
Central Michigan University	Chippewas	Mount Pleasant, Michigan	1892	Public	26,788
Eastern Michigan University	Eagles	Ypsilanti, Michigan	1849	Public	22,974
Northern Illinois University	Huskies	DeKalb, Illinois	1895	Public	25,313
University of Toledo	Rockets	Toledo, Ohio	1872	Public	19,706
Western Michigan University	Broncos	Kalamazoo, Michigan	1903	Public	24,818

Five schools have affiliate membership status:

Institution	Nickname	Location	Founded	Affiliation	Enrollment	Sport
Chicago State University	Cougars	Chicago, Illinois	1867	Public	7,131	Men's tennis
Florida Atlantic University	Owls	Boca Raton, Florida	1964	Public	26,245	Men's soccer
Hartwick College	Hawks	Oneonta, New York	1797	Private	1,520	Men's soccer
Missouri State University	Lady Bears	Springfield, Missouri	1905	Public	17,425	Field hockey
Temple University	Owls	Philadelphia, Pennsylvania	1884	Public	34,218	Football

== Reese and Jacoby trophies ==
The Reese and Jacoby trophies are awarded to the top men's and women's athletic departments in the Mid-American Conference.

Points are awarded based on each school's finish, with the overall total divided by the number of sports sponsored by each school. An institution may count either indoor track and field or outdoor track and field but not both.

=== Reese standings ===
Institution	BB	BKB	CC	FB	Golf	Soc	Sw	Ten	TFI	TFO	W	No. sports	Total	Avg
Kent State	10½	9½	9	5	12½	–	–	–	12	~~8~~	12	7	70½	10.07
Central Michigan	5	6	8	11½	–	–	–	–	~~4~~	6	10	6	46½	7.75
Eastern Michigan	6½	3½	12½	2½	11½	–	11	–	~~9~~	10	4	8	61½	7.69
Ohio	12	6	7	5	8	–	–	–	–	–	8	6	46	7.67
Ball State	9½	6	–	13	6	–	2½	8	–	–	–	6	45	7.50
Western Michigan	2	6	–	11½	–	5	–	12	–	–	–	5	36½	7.30
Akron	5	9½	5	5	1	12	–	–	~~7~~	12	–	7	49½	7.07
Miami	8½	9½	11½	1	5	–	8½	–	–	2	–	7	46	6.57
Bowling Green	13	12½	1	7½	2½	2	–	–	–	–	–	6	38½	6.42
NIU	3½	1½	–	9½	7	11	–	8	–	–	4	7	44½	6.36
Buffalo	1	12½	6	9½	–	9	5½	4	~~2~~	4	4	9	55½	6.17
Toledo	7½	1½	2½	2½	9	–	–	8	–	–	–	6	31	5.17
Temple *	–	–	–	7½	–	–	–	–	–	–	–	1	7½	7.50
Hartwick *	–	–	–	–	–	7	–	–	–	–	–	1	7	7.00
Florida Atlantic *	–	–	–	–	–	3	–	–	–	–	–	1	3	3.00
Chicago State *	–	–	–	–	–	–	–	2	–	–	–	1	2	2.00

* Affiliate status only. Does not qualify for trophy.

=== Jacoby standings ===
Institution	BKB	CC	FH	Golf	Gym	SB	Soc	Sw	Ten	TFI	TFO	VB	No. sports	Total	Avg
Miami	6	13	10	–	–	–	5½	12½	12½	10	–	9½	8	79	9.9
Central Michigan	8½	9½	7	–	–	–	11¼	–	–	6½	–	9½	6	52¼	8.7
Western Michigan	2	4½	–	8½	–	–	8½	–	10¼	8½	–	13	7	55¼	7.9
Toledo	10½	7½	–	7	–	–	13	10	6½	3½	–	5	8	63	7.9
Kent State	7½	5½	12	12½	–	–	3½	–	–	12	–	2	7	55	7.9
Ohio	6	10½	7	5	–	–	4½	7	–	5½	–	12	8	57½	7.2
Akron	4½	12	–	8½	–	–	2	5	6½	13	–	5	8	56½	7.1
Eastern Michigan	3½	3½	–	11½	–	–	11¼	10	5	4½	–	3½	8	52¾	6.6
Bowling Green	13	8½	–	1	–	–	6½	2¼	8	2	–	9½	8	50¾	6.3
Ball State	12	2	3	6	–	–	6½	2¼	1	10	–	6½	9	49¼	5.5
Buffalo	1	6½	–	–	–	–	1	7	10¼	7½	–	1	7	34¼	4.9
NIU	9½	1	–	2½	–	–	7½	–	2½	1	–	7½	7	31½	4.5
Missouri State *	–	–	3	–	–	–	–	–	–	–	–	–	1	3	3.0

* Affiliate status only. Does not qualify for trophy.

== Sports ==
=== Basketball (men's) ===
2008–09 Mid-American Conference men's basketball standings
	Conf.				Overall
Team	W		L	PCT	W		L	PCT
East
Bowling Green	11	–	5	.688	19	–	14	.576
Buffalo	11	–	5	.688	21	–	12	.636
Miami	10	–	6	.625	17	–	13	.567
Akron †	10	–	6	.625	23	–	13	.639
Kent State	10	–	6	.625	19	–	15	.559
Ohio	7	–	9	.438	15	–	17	.469
West
Ball State	7	–	9	.438	14	–	17	.452
Central Michigan	7	–	9	.438	12	–	19	.387
Western Michigan	7	–	9	.438	10	–	21	.323
Eastern Michigan	6	–	10	.375	8	–	24	.250
Northern Illinois	5	–	11	.313	10	–	20	.333
Toledo	5	–	11	.313	7	–	25	.219
† Conference tournament winner Rankings from AP Poll

==== Players of the week ====
The following are the MAC men's basketball players of the week. Number of awards won this season are in parentheses.

Week	Division	Player	School
November 17	East	Michael Bramos	Miami
November 17	West	David Kool	Western Michigan
November 24	East	Al Fisher	Kent State
November 24	West	Anthony Newell; Mike DiNunno	Ball State; NIU
December 1	East	Kenny Hayes	Miami
December 1	West	Darion Anderson	NIU
December 8	East	Michael Bramos (2)	Miami
December 8	West	Anthony Newell (2)	Ball State
December 15	East	Michael Bramos (3)	Miami
December 15	West	Darion Anderson (2)	NIU
December 22	East	Chris Singletary	Kent State
December 22	West	Anthony Newel (3); David Kool (2)	Ball State; Western Michigan
December 29	East	Chris Knight	Bowling Green
December 29	West	Justin Anyijong	Toledo
January 6	East	Jerome Tillman; Andy Robinson	Ohio; Buffalo
January 6	West	Jonathon Amos	Toledo
January 12	East	Chris Knight (2)	Bowling Green
January 12	West	David Kool (3)	Western Michigan

Week	Division	Player	School
January 19	East	Jerome Tillman (2)	Ohio
January 19	West	Brandon Bowdry	Eastern Michigan
January 26	East	Rodney Pierce	Buffalo
January 26	West	Marcus Van	Central Michigan
February 2	East	Tyler Dierkers	Miami
February 2	West	Jarrod Jones	Ball State
February 9	East	Nate Miller	Bowling Green
February 9	West	Robbie Harman	Central Michigan
February 16	East	Al Fisher (2)	Kent State
February 16	West	Darion Anderson (3)	NIU
February 23	East	Al Fisher (3)	Kent State
February 23	West	Tyrone Kent	Toledo
March 2	East		
March 2	West		
March 9	East		
March 9	West		

=== Basketball (women's) ===
==== Standings ====
Through March 8, 2009

===== East =====
Team	Conference				Overall		
Team	W	L	Pct.	GB	W	L	Pct.
Bowling Green	15	1	.938	–	26	3	.897
Kent State	8	8	.500	7	19	9	.679
Ohio *	7	9	.438	8	12	17	.414
Miami	7	9	.438	8	15	14	.517
Akron	6	10	.375	9	11	18	.379
Buffalo	2	14	.125	13	6	23	.207

===== West =====
Team	Conference				Overall		
Team	W	L	Pct.	GB	W	L	Pct.
Ball State	14	2	.875	–	22	8	.733
Toledo	11	5	.688	3	17	12	.586
NIU	10	6	.625	4	15	14	.517
Central Michigan	9	7	.563	5	17	13	.567
Eastern Michigan	4	12	.250	10	8	20	.286
Western Michigan	3	13	.188	11	7	22	.241

* Receives E3 seed based on 2–0 head-to-head record vs. Miami.

=== Cross country (men's) ===
Eastern Michigan won its fourth consecutive MAC Championship in 2008. The All-MAC team consisted of Ryan Bloom (Buffalo), Josh Karanja (Eastern Michigan), Sammy Kiprotch (Central Michigan), Aiman Scullion (Kent State), Kevin Silver (Miami), Pat Sovacool (Miami) and Curtis Vollmar (Eastern Michigan).

Sovacool of Miami was the only runner to qualify for the NCAA Championship. He finished 65th overall.

In the preseason poll voted by the MAC head coaches, Eastern Michigan was chosen to win the 2008 men's MAC Cross Country Championship. EMU had won the past three MAC Championships and had five All-MAC runners returning.

==== MAC Championship results ====
1. Eastern Michigan, 42 points
2. Miami, 56
3. Kent State, 61
4. Central Michigan, 103
5. Ohio, 122
6. Buffalo, 169
7. Akron, 179
8. Toledo, 186
9. Bowling Green, 270

==== Players of the week ====
Week	Player	School
September 2	Pat Sovacool	Miami
September 9	Pat Sovacool (2)	Miami
September 16	Tony Jordanek	Kent State
September 23	Pat Sovacool (3)	Miami
September 30	Shamus Eaton	Ohio

Week	Player	School
October 7	Josh Karanja	Eastern Michigan
October 14	R. P. White	Eastern Michigan
October 21	Josh Karanja	Eastern Michigan
October 28	Curtis Vollmar	Eastern Michigan

=== Cross country (women's) ===
==== MAC Championship results ====
1. Miami, 39 points
2. Akron, 81
3. Ohio, 107
4. Central Michigan, 141
5. Bowling Green, 147
6. Toledo, 165
7. Buffalo, 177
8. Kent State, 184
9. Western Michigan, 218
10. Eastern Michigan, 238
11. Ball State, 251
12. NIU, 355

==== Players of the week ====
Week	Player	School
September 2	Laura Neufarth	Miami
September 9	Kim Lorentz	Akron
September 16	Laura Neufarth (2)	Miami
September 23	Kim Lorentz (2)	Akron

Week	Player	School
September 30	Kari Summers	Ohio
October 7	Kim Lorentz (3)	Akron
October 14	Kari Summers (2)	Ohio

=== Field hockey ===
==== Standings ====
Team	Conference				Overall		
Team	W	L	Pct.	GB	W	L	Pct.
Kent State	9	1	.900	–	15	4	.789
Miami	7	3	.700	2	14	6	.700
Central Michigan	6	4	.600	3	7	11	.389
Ohio	6	4	.600	3	9	11	.450
Ball State	1	9	.100	8	2	16	.111
Missouri State	1	9	.100	8	6	14	.300

=== Football ===
2008 Mid-American Conference football standings
	Conf.			Overall
Team	W		L	W		L
East Division
Buffalo x$	5	–	3	8	–	6
Bowling Green	4	–	4	6	–	6
Temple	4	–	4	5	–	7
Ohio	3	–	5	4	–	8
Akron	3	–	5	5	–	7
Kent State	3	–	5	4	–	8
Miami (OH)	1	–	7	2	–	10
West Division
Ball State x	8	–	0	12	–	2
Central Michigan	6	–	2	8	–	5
Western Michigan	6	–	2	9	–	4
Northern Illinois	5	–	3	6	–	7
Toledo	2	–	6	3	–	9
Eastern Michigan	2	–	6	3	–	9
Championship: Buffalo 42, Ball State 24
$ – Conference champion; x – Division champion/co-champions

Ball State started the 2008 football season 12–0, going undefeated in conference play and defeating Indiana and Navy in out of conference games. BSU was ranked as high as 12th in the Associated Press Poll and 13th in the Coaches' Poll. They were also ranked 12th at one point in the Bowl Championship Series (BCS) rankings. However, Ball State was upset by Buffalo in the MAC Championship game, lost their bowl game vs. Tulsa and finished unranked in each of the polls.

In regular season non-conference games, the MAC defeated BCS opponents #25 Pittsburgh (Bowling Green won 27–17), Syracuse (Akron won 42–28), Indiana (Ball State won 42–20 and Central Michigan won 37–34), Illinois (Western Michigan won 23–17) and Michigan (Toledo won 13–10).

Despite having a successful non-conference record and gaining five bowl bids, the MAC finished the bowl season poorly. The MAC was the only conference to not win a bowl game and finished 0–5.

=== Golf (women's) ===
==== MAC Championship ====
1. Kent State (1217)
2. Eastern Michigan (1256)
3. Akron (1297)
3. Western Michigan (1297)
5. Toledo (1305)
6. Ball State (1313)
7. Ohio (1318)
8. NIU (1366)
9. Bowling Green (1401)

=== Soccer (men's) ===
==== Standings ====
Team	Conference					Overall			
Team	W	L	T	Pct.	GB	W	L	T	Pct.
Akron	6	0	0	1.000	–	17	2	4	.826
NIU	4	1	1	.750	1½	11	6	4	.619
Buffalo	3	1	2	.667	2	12	4	4	.700
Hartwick	2	2	2	.500	3	7	5	7	.553
Western Michigan	2	4	0	.333	4	3	14	1	.194
Florida Atlantic	1	4	1	.250	4½	5	13	1	.289
Bowling Green	0	6	0	.000	6	4	13	2	.263

=== Soccer (women's) ===
==== Standings ====
Team	Conference					Overall			
Team	W	L	T	Pct.	GB	W	L	T	Pct.
Toledo	8	2	1	.773	–	16	5	1	.750
Central Michigan	6	2	3	.682	1	12	5	3	.675
Eastern Michigan	6	2	3	.682	1	13	5	5	.630
Bowling Green	6	3	2	.636	1½	12	6	4	.636
Western Michigan	6	4	1	.591	2	7	11	1	.395
NIU	5	4	2	.545	2½	9	6	5	.575
Ball State	5	5	1	.500	3	9	10	1	.475
Miami	5	6	0	.455	3½	6	12	1	.342
Ohio	4	5	2	.455	3½	5	10	3	.361
Kent State	3	7	1	.318	5	6	11	1	.361
Akron	2	7	2	.273	5½	7	9	2	.444
Buffalo	0	9	2	.091	7½	4	10	4	.278

=== Swimming (men's) ===
==== Standings ====
Team	Conference					Overall	
Team	W	L	Pct.	GB	W	L	Pct.
Eastern Michigan	3	0	1.000	–	5	2	.714
Miami	2	1	.667	1	4	7	.364
Buffalo	1	2	.333	2	4	3	.571
Ball State	0	3	.000	3	1	4	.200

==== MAC Championship results ====
1. Eastern Michigan, 1046.5 points
2. Buffalo, 639.5
3. Miami, 588
4. Ball State, 267

=== Swimming (women's) ===
==== Standings ====
Team	Conference					Overall	
Team	W	L	Pct.	GB	W	L	Pct.
Miami	6	1	.857	–	10	2	.833
Eastern Michigan	5	2	.714	1	7	4	.636
Toledo	5	2	.714	1	6	5	.545
Ohio	4	3	.571	2	9	3	.750
Buffalo	4	3	.571	2	8	3	.727
Akron	2	5	.286	4	6	6	.500
Ball State	1	6	.143	5	2	7	.222
Bowling Green	1	6	.143	5	2	7	.222

==== MAC Championship results ====
1. Miami, 639½ points
2. Ohio, 611½
3. Toledo, 568½
4. Eastern Michigan, 497½
5. Akron, 347
6. Buffalo, 335
7. Bowling Green, 305½
8. Ball State, 200½

=== Track and field (men's) ===
==== Indoor MAC Championships ====
1. Kent State, 159 points
2. Eastern Michigan, 132
3. Akron, 109
4. Central Michigan, 64
5. Buffalo, 61

=== Track and field (women's) ===
==== Indoor MAC Championships ====
1. Akron, 126 points
2. Kent State, 101
3. Miami, 73
3. Ball State, 73
5. Western Michigan, 62
6. Buffalo, 52
7. Central Michigan, 44½
8. Ohio, 42½
9. Eastern Michigan, 42
10. Toledo, 35
11. Bowling Green, 11
12. NIU, 1

=== Volleyball ===
==== Tournament bracket ====
November 18; Campus sites
8	Toledo	3
9	Akron	1
5	Bowling Green	3
12	Buffalo	1
7	Ball State	3
10	Eastern Michigan	0
6	NIU	3
11	Kent State	2

November 21; SeaGate Centre
8	Toledo	0
1	Western Michigan	3
5	Bowling Green	3
4	Central Michigan	1
7	Ball State	0
2	Ohio	3
6	NIU	2
3	Miami	3

November 22; SeaGate Centre
1	Western Michigan	3
5	Bowling Green	1
2	Ohio	3
3	Miami	1

November 23; SeaGate Centre
1	Western Michigan	1
2	Ohio	3

==== Standings ====
===== East =====
Team	Conference				Overall		
Team	W	L	Pct.	GB	W	L	Pct.
Ohio	13	3	.813	–	21	7	.750
Bowling Green	12	4	.750	1	25	8	.758
Miami	12	4	.750	1	19	10	.655
Akron	5	11	.313	8	11	17	.393
Kent State	3	13	.188	10	13	17	.433
Buffalo	1	15	.063	12	6	25	.194

===== West =====
Team	Conference				Overall		
Team	W	L	Pct.	GB	W	L	Pct.
Western Michigan	14	2	.875	–	24	4	.857
Central Michigan	12	4	.750	2	19	11	.633
NIU	9	7	.563	5	18	14	.563
Ball State	6	10	.375	8	12	21	.364
Toledo	5	11	.313	9	14	17	.452
Eastern Michigan	4	12	.250	10	9	22	.290

=== Wrestling ===
==== Standings ====
Team	Conference					Overall			
Team	W	L	T	Pct.	GB	W	L	T	Pct.
Kent State	5	0	0	1.000	–	13	4	0	.765
Central Michigan	4	1	0	.800	1	17	3	1	.833
Ohio	3	2	0	.600	2	9	9	1	.500
Buffalo	1	4	0	.200	4	9	11	0	.450
Eastern Michigan	1	4	0	.200	4	7	11	0	.389
NIU	1	4	0	.200	4	5	8	0	.385

== See also ==
- Mid-American Conference
- List of Mid-American Conference champions
