= 2008 Texas Bowl =

- Texas Bowl logo
| Western Michigan Broncos | Rice Owls |
| (9–3) | (9–3) |
| MAC | C-USA |
| 14 | 38 |
| Head coach: Bill Cubit | Head coach: David Bailiff |
| | 1 | 2 | 3 | 4 | Total |
|---|---|---|---|---|---|
| Western Michigan | 0 | 0 | 0 | 14 | 14 |
| Rice | 10 | 14 | 7 | 7 | 38 |
- Date: December 30, 2008
- Season: 2008
- Stadium: Reliant Stadium
- Location: Houston, Texas
- MVP: QB Chase Clement, Rice
- Favorite: Rice by 3
- Referee: Frank White (WAC)
- Attendance: 58,880
- Payout: US$750,000 per team

United States TV coverage
- Network: NFL Network
- Announcers: Fran Charles, Tom Waddle, and Kara Henderson
- Nielsen ratings: 0.1

The 2008 Texas Bowl was the third edition of the college football bowl game, and was played at Reliant Stadium in Houston, Texas. The game was played at 7:00 p.m. US CST on Tuesday, December 30, 2008. The game, telecast on NFL Network, featured the hometown Rice Owls against the Western Michigan Broncos. The Owls won the game 38-14, which was their first post-season victory since the 1954 Cotton Bowl Classic.

The game was televised on the NFL Network for the third year in a row. Fran Charles, Tom Waddle, and Kara Henderson called the action.

== Game summary ==
=== Scoring ===
| Scoring play | Score |
|---|---|
1st quarter
| Rice – Chase Clement 26-yard TD run (Clark Fangmeier kick), 5:21 | Rice 7–0 |
| Rice – Fangmeier 30-yard FG, :22 | Rice 10–0 |
2nd quarter
| Rice – Toren Dixon 6-yard TD pass from Clement (Fangmeier kick), 6:53 | Rice 17–0 |
| Rice – James Casey 45-yard TD pass from Clement (Fangmeier kick), 1:15 | Rice 24–0 |
3rd quarter
| Rice – Clement 13-yard TD pass from Jarrett Dillard (Fangmeier kick), 6:35 | Rice 31–0 |
4th quarter
| Rice – Dillard 18-yard TD pass from Clement (Fangmeier kick), 9:38 | Rice 38–0 |
| WMU – Kirk Elsworth 2-yard TD pass from Tim Hiller (John Potter kick), 6:33 | Rice 38–7 |
| WMU – Schneider Julien 13-yard TD pass from Hiller (Potter kick), 0:25 | Rice 38–14 |

=== Statistics ===
| Statistics | WMU | RICE |
|---|---|---|
| First downs | 15 | 28 |
| Plays–yards | 62–278 | 84–455 |
| Rushes–yards | 19–61 | 37–135 |
| Passing yards | 217 | 320 |
| Passing: Comp–Att–Int | 20–43–2 | 31–47–0 |
| Time of possession | 21:31 | 38:29 |
