= List of UCLA Bruins bowl games =

Through 2023, the UCLA Bruins have played in 38 bowl games, compiling a record of 18–20–1 (.474).

After California's third straight Rose Bowl loss in 1951, the Pacific Coast Conference disallowed consecutive appearances. The first PCC program adversely affected was UCLA; the undefeated and second-ranked 1954 team was ineligible for the 1955 Rose Bowl; it would have been the second of three consecutive. The rule was dropped by the succeeding AAWU (Big Five) in 1959 (Washington won in 1960 and 1961), but the Big Ten kept it from the late 1940s until the early 1970s.

The Pac-8 (and Big Ten) did not allow multiple bowl teams until the 1975 season, in which the Bruins won the Rose Bowl. In twelve Rose Bowl appearances, UCLA has won five (.417), with three streaks: five losses, five wins, and currently two losses. The last victory was in January 1986 (third in four years), and the most recent appearance was in 1999.

== Key ==
General
†	Bowl game record attendance
‡	Former bowl game record attendance
*	Denotes national championship game

Results
W	Win
L	Loss
T	Tie

== Bowl games ==
List of bowl games showing bowl played in, date, winning team, score, losing team, stadium, location, attendance, head coach, and MVP
#	Bowl	Date	Winning team	Score	Losing team	Stadium	Location	Attendance	Head coach	MVP
1	Rose Bowl	January 1, 1943	Georgia	L 0–9	UCLA	Rose Bowl	Pasadena, California	93,000	Edwin Horrell	Charley Trippi (Georgia)
2	Rose Bowl	January 1, 1947	Illinois	L 14–45	UCLA	Rose Bowl	Pasadena, California	93,000	Bert LaBrucherie	Buddy Young (Illinois); Julius Rykovich (Illinois)
3	Rose Bowl	January 1, 1954	Michigan State	L 20–28	UCLA	Rose Bowl	Pasadena, California	100,500	"Red" Sanders	Billy Wells (MSU)
4	Rose Bowl	January 1, 1956	Michigan State	L 14–17	UCLA	Rose Bowl	Pasadena, California	100,809	"Red" Sanders	Walt Kowalczyk (MSU)
5	Rose Bowl	January 1, 1962	Minnesota	L 3–21	UCLA	Rose Bowl	Pasadena, California	98,214	Bill Barnes	Sandy Stephens (Minnesota)
6	Rose Bowl	January 1, 1966	UCLA	W 14–12	Michigan State	Rose Bowl	Pasadena, California	100,087	Tommy Prothro	Bob Stiles (UCLA)
7	Rose Bowl	January 1, 1976	UCLA	W 23–10	Ohio State	Rose Bowl	Pasadena, California	105,464	Dick Vermeil	John Sciarra (UCLA)
8	Liberty Bowl	December 20, 1976	Alabama	L 6–36	UCLA	Memphis Memorial Stadium	Memphis, Tennessee	52,736	Terry Donahue	Barry Krauss (Alabama)
9	Fiesta Bowl	December 25, 1978	UCLA	T 10–10	Arkansas	Sun Devil Stadium	Tempe, Arizona	55,227	Terry Donahue	James Owens (UCLA); Jimmy Walker (Arkansas)
10	Bluebonnet Bowl	December 31, 1981	Michigan	L 14–33	UCLA	Houston Astrodome	Houston, Texas	50,107	Terry Donahue	Butch Woolfolk (Michigan)
11	Rose Bowl	January 1, 1983	UCLA	W 24–14	Michigan	Rose Bowl	Pasadena, California	104,991	Terry Donahue	Tom Ramsey (UCLA); Don Rogers (UCLA)
12	Rose Bowl	January 2, 1984	UCLA	W 45–9	Illinois	Rose Bowl	Pasadena, California	103,217	Terry Donahue	Rick Neuheisel (UCLA)
13	Fiesta Bowl	January 1, 1985	UCLA	W 39–37	Miami	Sun Devil Stadium	Tempe, Arizona	60,310	Terry Donahue	Gaston Green (UCLA); James Washington (UCLA)
14	Rose Bowl	January 1, 1986	UCLA	W 45–28	Iowa	Rose Bowl	Pasadena, California	103,292	Terry Donahue	Eric Ball (UCLA)
15	Freedom Bowl	December 30, 1986	UCLA	W 31–10	Brigham Young	Anaheim Stadium	Anaheim, California	55,422	Terry Donahue	Gaston Green (UCLA)
16	Aloha Bowl	December 25, 1987	UCLA	W 20–16	Florida	Aloha Stadium	Honolulu, HI	24,839	Terry Donahue	Troy Aikman (UCLA); Emmitt Smith (Florida)
17	Cotton Bowl	January 2, 1989	UCLA	W 17–3	Arkansas	Cotton Bowl	Dallas	74,304	Terry Donahue	Troy Aikman (UCLA); LaSalle Harber (Arkansas)
18	Sun Bowl	December 31, 1991	UCLA	W 6–3	Illinois	Sun Bowl Stadium	El Paso, Texas	42,281	Terry Donahue	Arnold Ale (UCLA)
19	Rose Bowl	January 1, 1994	Wisconsin	L 16–21	UCLA	Rose Bowl	Pasadena, California	101,237	Terry Donahue	Brent Moss (Wisconsin)
20	Aloha Bowl	December 25, 1995	Kansas	L 30–51	UCLA	Aloha Stadium	Honolulu, HI	41,112	Terry Donahue	Karim Abdul-Jabbar (UCLA); Mark Williams (Kansas)
21	Cotton Bowl	January 1, 1998	UCLA	W 29–23	Texas A&M	Cotton Bowl	Dallas	59,215	Bob Toledo	Cade McNown (UCLA); Dat Nguyen (Texas A&M)
22	Rose Bowl	January 1, 1999	Wisconsin	L 31–38	UCLA	Rose Bowl	Pasadena, California	93,872	Bob Toledo	Ron Dayne (Wisconsin)
23	Sun Bowl	December 29, 2000	Wisconsin	L 20–21	UCLA	Sun Bowl Stadium	El Paso, Texas	49,093	Bob Toledo	Freddie Mitchell (UCLA)
24	Las Vegas Bowl	December 25, 2002	UCLA	W 27–13	New Mexico	Sam Boyd Stadium	Whitney, Nevada	30,324	Ed Kezirian	Craig Bragg (UCLA)
25	Silicon Valley Bowl	December 30, 2003	Fresno State	L 9–17	UCLA	Spartan Stadium	San Jose, California	20,126	Karl Dorrell	Garrett McIntyre (FSU); Rodney Davis (FSU)
26	Las Vegas Bowl	December 23, 2004	Wyoming	L 21–24	UCLA	Sam Boyd Stadium	Whitney, Nevada	29,062	Karl Dorrell	Corey Bramlet (Wyoming)
27	Sun Bowl	December 30, 2005	UCLA	W 50–38	Northwestern	Sun Bowl Stadium	El Paso, Texas	50,426	Karl Dorrell	Kahlil Bell (UCLA); Chris Markey (UCLA)
28	Emerald Bowl	December 27, 2006	Florida State	L 27–44	UCLA	AT&T Park	San Francisco	40,331	Karl Dorrell	Lorenzo Booker (FSU); Tony Carter (FSU)
29	Las Vegas Bowl	December 22, 2007	Brigham Young	L 16–17	UCLA	Sam Boyd Stadium	Whitney, Nevada	40,712	DeWayne Walker	Austin Collie (BYU)
30	EagleBank Bowl	December 29, 2009	UCLA	W 30–21	Temple	RFK Stadium	Washington, D.C.	23,072	Rick Neuheisel	Akeem Ayers (UCLA)
31	Kraft Fight Hunger Bowl	December 31, 2011	Illinois	L 14–20	UCLA	AT&T Park	San Francisco	29,878	Mike Johnson	Terry Hawthorne (Illinois); Nathan Scheelhaase (Illinois)
32	Holiday Bowl	December 27, 2012	Baylor	L 26–49	No. 17 UCLA	Qualcomm Stadium	San Diego	55,507	Jim L. Mora	Lache Seastrunk (Baylor); Chris McAllister (Baylor)
33	Sun Bowl	December 31, 2013	No. 17 UCLA	W 42–12	Virginia Tech	Sun Bowl Stadium	El Paso, Texas	47,912	Jim L. Mora	Brett Hundley (UCLA); Jordan Zumwalt (UCLA)
34	Alamo Bowl	January 2, 2015	No. 14 UCLA	W 40–35	No. 11 Kansas State	Alamodome	San Antonio, Texas	60,517	Jim L. Mora	Paul Perkins (UCLA); Eric Kendricks (UCLA); Tyler Lockett (Kansas State)
35	Foster Farms Bowl	December 26, 2015	Nebraska	L 29–37	UCLA	Levi's Stadium	Santa Clara, California	33,257	Jim L. Mora	Tommy Armstrong, Jr. (Nebraska); Jaleel Wadood (UCLA)
36	Cactus Bowl	December 26, 2017	Kansas State	L 17–35	UCLA	Chase Field	Phoenix, Arizona	32,859	Jedd Fisch	Alex Delton (Kansas State); Denzel Goolsby (Kansas State)
37	Sun Bowl	December 30, 2022	Pittsburgh	L 35–37	UCLA	Sun Bowl Stadium	El Paso, Texas	41,104	Chip Kelly	Rodney Hammond Jr. (Pittsburgh)
38	LA Bowl	December 16, 2023	UCLA	W 35–22	Boise State	SoFi Stadium	Inglewood, California	32,780	Chip Kelly	Ethan Garbers (UCLA); Darius Muasau (UCLA)

Note: UCLA also played in the 1939 Pineapple Bowl, beating Hawaii W 32–7. However, the NCAA does not consider it a Major Bowl, and therefore does not count it towards a team's bowl record as it was a pre-scheduled game.

== Game notes ==
=== 1943 Rose Bowl ===
	1	2	3	4	Total
Georgia	0	0	0	9	9
UCLA	0	0	0	0	0

1st quarter scoring: No score

2nd quarter scoring: No score

3rd quarter scoring: No score

4th quarter scoring: Georgia – Willard "Red" Boyd blocks Bob Waterfield's punt out of bounds for an automatic safety; Georgia – Frank Sinkwich, one-yard run (Leo Costa converts)

=== 1947 Rose Bowl ===
The 33rd Rose Bowl featured the 10-0 UCLA Bruins, led by head coach Ray Eliot, and the 7-2 Illinois Fighting Illini, led by head coach Bert LaBrucherie. UCLA lost the game, 14-45, they were favored to win by 14 points. Illinois rushed for a combined 320 yards, a then Rose Bowl record (Harrison 2018). UCLA Bruins kick returner, and member of the Rose Bowl Hall of Fame, Al Hoisch, returned a kickoff 103 yards for a touchdown, a current Rose Bowl record (Bowman).

	1	2	3	4	Total
Illinois	6	19	0	20	45
UCLA	7	7	0	0	14

First quarter scoring:

- Illinois - Julius Rykovich, one-yard run. (Kick failed).
- UCLA - Ernie Case, one-yard quarterback sneak. (Case converts).

Second quarter scoring:

- Illinois - Buddy Young, two-yard run. (Maechtle converts).
- Illinois - Paul Patterson four yard run. (Kick failed).
- Illinois - Perry Moss one-yard sneak. (Kick blocked).
- UCLA - Al Hoisch returns Maechtle's kickoff 103. (Case converts).

Third quarter scoring:

- No scoring.

Fourth quarter scoring:

- Illinois - Young, one-yard run. (Maechtle converts).
- Illinois - Russ Steger, 68-yard interception return. (Kick failed).
- Illinois - Stan Green, 20 yard interception return. (Maechtle converts).

=== 1954 Rose Bowl ===
- In the fourth quarter, the Bruins recovered another Spartan fumble and scored to make the score 21–20. But the extra point kick failed. Billy Wells of Michigan State returned a punt 62 yards for a touchdown with 4:51 left in the game.

=== 1986 Rose Bowl ===
The 72nd Rose Bowl Game played on January 1, 1986. Between The UCLA Bruins upset the Iowa Hawkeyes. The UCLA Bruins upset the Iowa Hawkeyes 45–28. UCLA tailback Eric Ball was named the Player Of The Game. He ran for a Rose Bowl record four touchdowns and was MVP of the game. The game Attendance was 103,292.

Box Score
Team	1st Q	2nd Q	3rd Q	4th Q	Total
UCLA	10	14	7	14	45
Iowa	7	3	7	11	28

=== 1994 Rose Bowl ===
	1	2	3	4	Total
#9 Wisconsin	7	7	0	7	21
#14 UCLA	3	0	0	13	16

The weather was 73 degrees and hazy. UCLA receiver J. J. Stokes set Rose Bowl records for receptions (14) and receiving yards (176). Brent Moss gashed the UCLA defense for 158 rushing yards and 2 TDs.

First quarter scoring: UCLA — Bjorn Merten 27-yard field goal; Wisconsin — Brent Moss three-yard run (Rick Schnetzky kick)

Second quarter scoring: Wisconsin — Moss one-yard run (Schnetzky kick)

Third quarter scoring: No Scoring

Fourth quarter scoring: UCLA — Ricky Davis 12-yard run (Merten kick); Wisconsin — Darrell Bevell 21-yard run (Schnetzky kick); UCLA — Mike Nguyen five-yard pass from Wayne Cook (2-point conversion pass failed)

Statistics

Team stats	Wisconsin	UCLA
First downs	21	31
Net yards rushing	250	212
Net yards passing	96	288
Total yards	346	500
PC–PA–Int.	10–20–1	28–43–1
Punts–Avg.	6–38.2	2–35.0
Fumbles–Lost	2–0	5–5
Penalties–Yards	12–89	9–95

=== 1995 Aloha Bowl ===
	1	2	3	4	Total
UCLA	0	0	7	23	30
Kansas	7	10	20	14	51

First quarter scoring: KU—Jim Moore, nine-yard pass from Mark Williams. Jeff McCord converts.

Second quarter scoring: KU—June Henley, 49-yard run. McCord converts; KU—McCord, 27-yard field goal.

Third quarter scoring KU—Henley, two-yard run. McCord kick fails; UCLA—Brad Melsby, eight-yard pass from Cade McNown (Bjorn Merten kick); KU—Isaac Byrd, 77-yard pass from Williams (McCord converts); KU—Andre Carter, 27-yard pass from Williams (McCord converts)

Fourth quarter scoring UCLA—Kevin Jordan, eight-yard pass from McNown (Merten kick); UCLA — Karim Abdul-Jabbar five-yard run (Melsby pass from McNown); KU—Williams, six-yard run (McCord converts); UCLA—Melsby, seven-yard pass from McNown (Abdul-Jabbar run); KU—Eric Vann, 67-yard run (McCord converts)

=== 1998 Cotton Bowl Classic ===
UCLA vs. Texas A&M

Team	1	2	3	4	Total
• #5 Bruins	0	7	14	8	29
#20 Aggies	7	9	7	0	23

- Date: January 1, 1998
- Location: Cotton Bowl, Dallas
- Game attendance: 59,215
- Game weather: Partly Cloudy, 53°F
- TV announcers (CBS): Gus Johnson, Mike Mayock

=== 1999 Rose Bowl ===
Wisconsin vs. UCLA

Team	1	2	3	4	Total
• #9 Badgers	7	17	7	7	38
#6 Bruins	7	14	7	3	31

- Date: January 1, 1999
- Location: Rose Bowl, Pasadena, California
- Game attendance: 93,872
- Game weather: Sunny, 74°F
- TV announcers (ABC): Keith Jackson, Bob Griese

=== 2000 Sun Bowl ===
UCLA vs. Wisconsin

Team	1	2	3	4	Total
Bruins	10	7	3	0	20
• Badgers	7	0	7	7	21

- Date: December 29, 2000
- Location: Sun Bowl Stadium, El Paso, Texas
- Game start: 11 AM PST
- Game attendance: 49,093
- TV announcers (CBS): Sean McDonough, Todd Blackledge

=== 2002 Las Vegas Bowl ===
New Mexico vs. UCLA

Team	1	2	3	4	Total
Lobos	6	0	0	7	13
• Bruins	3	3	7	14	27

- Date: December 25, 2002
- Location: Sam Boyd Stadium, Whitney, Nevada
- Game start: 1:30 PM PST
- Elapsed time: 3:30
- Game attendance: 30,324
- Game weather: Clear, 50°F, 2mph S
- Referee: Rogers Redding

=== 2003 Silicon Valley Bowl ===
UCLA vs. Fresno State

Team	1	2	3	4	Total
Bruins	0	7	2	0	9
• Bulldogs	14	3	0	0	17

- Date: December 30, 2003
- Location: Spartan Stadium, San Jose, California
- Game start: 7:34 PM PST
- Elapsed time: 3:17
- Game attendance: 20,126
- Game weather: Cool, 54°F, wind SE
- Referee: David Witvoet

=== 2004 Las Vegas Bowl ===
Wyoming vs. UCLA

Team	1	2	3	4	Total
• Cowboys	10	0	0	14	24
Bruins	0	14	7	0	21

- Date: December 23, 2004
- Location: Sam Boyd Stadium, Whitney, Nevada
- Game start: 7:00 PM PST
- Elapsed time: 3:36
- Game attendance: 29,062
- Game weather: Partly cloudy, 42°F, 9mph N
- Referee: Rocky Goode

=== 2005 Sun Bowl ===
Northwestern vs. UCLA

Team	1	2	3	4	Total
Wildcats	22	0	3	13	38
• #17 Bruins	7	22	7	14	50

- Date: December 30, 2005
- Location: Sun Bowl Stadium, El Paso, Texas
- Game start: 12:13 PM PST
- Elapsed time: 4:15
- Game attendance: 50,426
- Game weather: Clear, 56°F, 7mph NW
- Referee: Dan Romeo
- TV announcers (CBS): Verne Lundquist, Todd Blackledge, Tracy Wolfson

=== 2006 Emerald Bowl ===
Florida State vs. UCLA

Team	1	2	3	4	Total
• Seminoles	7	6	10	21	44
Bruins	10	10	7	0	27

- Date: December 27, 2006
- Location: AT&T Park, San Francisco, California
- Game start: 5:01 PM PST
- Elapsed time: 3:45
- Game attendance: 40,331
- Game weather: 55°F, Clear and Windy, 25mph NW
- Referee: Steve Barth
- TV announcers (ESPN): Sean McDonough, Chris Spielman

On February 8, 2010, Florida State University agreed to accept NCAA sanctions against its athletic programs, and agreed to vacate 12 football victories, including the 2006 Emerald Bowl victory over UCLA. Florida State has stated their intention to return the championship trophy.

=== 2007 Las Vegas Bowl ===
UCLA vs. Brigham Young

Team	1	2	3	4	Total
Bruins	3	10	0	3	16
• #19 Cougars	3	14	0	0	17

- Date: December 22, 2007
- Location: Sam Boyd Stadium, Whitney, Nevada
- Game start: 5:12 PM PST
- Elapsed time: 3:23
- Game attendance: 40,712
- Game weather: Clear and cold, 42°F, calm
- Referee: Ed Kierce
- TV announcers (ESPN): Brad Nessler (play-by-play),
  Bob Griese, Paul Maguire

=== 2009 EagleBank Bowl ===
UCLA vs. Temple

Team	1	2	3	4	Total
• Bruins	7	3	7	13	30
Owls	7	14	0	0	21

- Date: December 29, 2009
- Location: RFK Stadium, Washington, D.C.
- Game start: 1:30 PM PST
- Elapsed time: 3:14
- Game attendance: 23,072
- Game weather: Cold and windy, 30°F, Brisk wind
- Referee: Todd Geerlings
- TV announcers (ESPN): Bob Wischusen (play-by-play),
  Brian Griese (color commentary), Rob Stone (sideline)

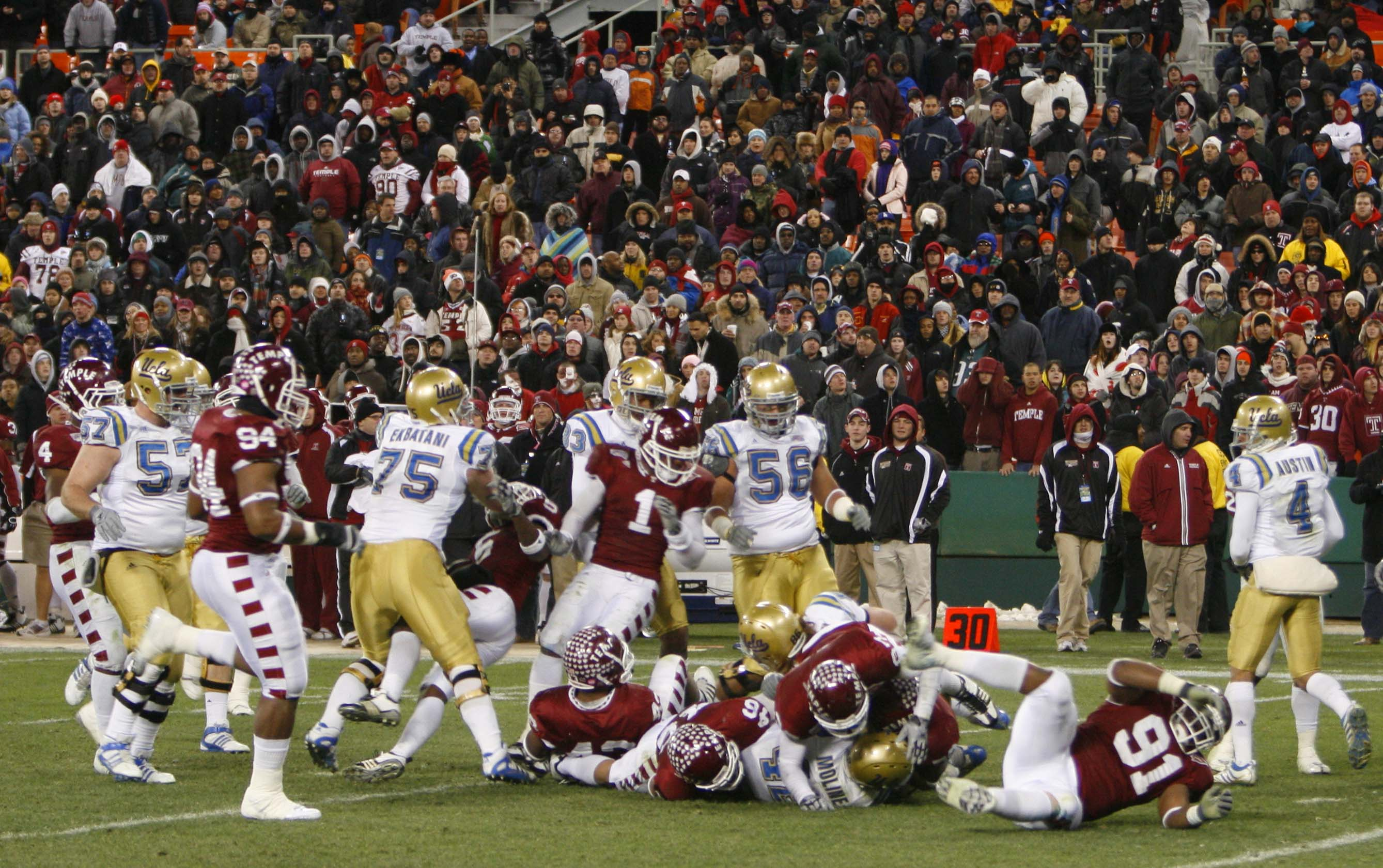

=== 2011 Kraft Fight Hunger Bowl ===
Illinois vs. UCLA

Team	1	2	3	4	Total
• Fighting Illini	0	3	7	10	20
Bruins	0	7	0	7	14

- Date: December 31, 2011
- Location: AT&T Park, San Francisco, California
- Game start: 12:36 PM PST
- Elapsed time: 3:20
- Game attendance: 29,878
- Game weather: Partly cloudy, 6mph NNE, 63°F
- Referee: Jeff Hilyer
- TV announcers (ESPN): Carter Blackburn (play-by-play), Brock Huard (analyst), Shelley Smith (sidelines)

=== 2012 Bridgepoint Education Holiday Bowl ===
Baylor vs. UCLA

Team	1	2	3	4	Total
• Bears	14	21	7	7	49
#17 Bruins	0	10	3	13	26

- Date: December 27, 2012
- Location: Qualcomm Stadium, San Diego, California
- Game start: 7:00 PM PST
- Elapsed time: 3:30
- Game attendance: 55,507
- Game weather: Clear, Calm, 53°F
- Referee: Wayne Winkler
- TV announcers (ESPN): Dave Pasch (play-by-play), Brian Griese (analyst), Jenn Brown (sidelines)

Baylor (8–5) vs No. 17 UCLA (9–5)

=== 2013 80th Hyundai Sun Bowl ===
Virginia Tech vs. UCLA

Team	1	2	3	4	Total
Hokies	7	0	3	2	12
• #17 Bruins	7	7	0	28	42

- Date: December 31, 2013
- Location: Sun Bowl, El Paso, Texas
- Game start: 11:15 PM PST
- Elapsed time: 3:44
- Game attendance: 47,912
- Game weather: Sunny, Calm, 47°F
- Referee: Scott Novak
- TV announcers (CBS): Verne Lundquist (play-by-play), Gary Danielson (color analyst), Tracy Wolfson (sideline)

Virginia Tech (8–5,5–3) vs. No. 17 UCLA (10–3,6–3)

=== 2015 22nd Valero Alamo Bowl ===
Kansas State vs. UCLA

Team	1	2	3	4	Total
#11 Wildcats	0	6	15	14	35
• #14 Bruins	17	14	3	6	40

- Date: January 2, 2015
- Location: Alamodome, San Antonio, Texas
- Game start: 05:45 PM CST
- Elapsed time: 3:43
- Game attendance: 60,517
- Game weather: Indoors (dome)
- Referee: Jerry McGinn
- TV announcers (ESPN): Joe Tessitore (play-by-play), Brock Huard (color analyst), Shannon Spake (sideline)

#11 Kansas State (9–3,7–2) vs. No. 14 UCLA (9–3,6–3)

=== 2017 Cactus Bowl ===
Kansas State Wildcats (7–5) vs. UCLA Bruins (6–6)

	1	2	3	4	Total
Wildcats	7	0	14	14	35
Bruins	3	14	0	0	17

=== 2021 Holiday Bowl ===
No. 18 NC State Wolfpack (9–3) vs. UCLA Bruins (8–4)

	1	2	3	4	Total
No. 18 Wolfpack	0	0	0	0	0
Bruins	0	0	0	0	0
