= 2009 UCLA Bruins football team =

American college football season

2009 UCLA Bruins football

EagleBank Bowl champion

EagleBank Bowl, W 30–21 vs. Temple
- Conference: Pacific-10 Conference
- Record: 7–6 (3–6 Pac-10)
- Head coach: Rick Neuheisel (2nd season)
- Offensive coordinator: Norm Chow (2nd season)
- Offensive scheme: Pro-style
- Defensive coordinator: Chuck Bullough (1st season)
- Base defense: 3–4
- Home stadium: Rose Bowl

2009 Pacific-10 Conference football standings
	Conf.			Overall
Team	W		L	W		L
No. 11 Oregon $	8	–	1	10	–	3
Arizona	6	–	3	8	–	5
Oregon State	6	–	3	8	–	5
Stanford	6	–	3	8	–	5
No. 22 USC	5	–	4	9	–	4
California	5	–	4	8	–	5
Washington	4	–	5	5	–	7
UCLA	3	–	6	7	–	6
Arizona State	2	–	7	4	–	8
Washington State	0	–	9	1	–	11
$ – BCS representative as conference champion; Rankings from AP Poll

The 2009 UCLA Bruins football team represented the University of California, Los Angeles (UCLA) in the 2009 NCAA Division I FBS football season. Under second-year head coach Rick Neuheisel, they opened the season at the Rose Bowl on September 5 against San Diego State. The last game of the season, against USC was moved from the "Championship Saturday" weekend of December. Instead, the UCLA–USC rivalry game was played on Saturday, November 28 at the Los Angeles Memorial Coliseum.

Following the regular season, which they finished with six wins and six losses, the Bruins were invited to play in the 2009 EagleBank Bowl, thanks to the normal tie-in Army not being bowl eligible at 5–7. UCLA defeated Temple 30–21 to finish the season with a winning record.

All regular season UCLA football games were broadcast on the UCLA ISP Sports Network (AM 570 KLAC in Southern California) and SIRIUS Satellite Radio nationally.

== Recruiting ==
On Wednesday, February 4, 2009, UCLA announced 22 letter-of-intent signings from high school football players, including Richard Brehaut, Rancho Cucamonga, CA; Randall Carroll, Los Angeles, CA; Todd Golper, Arcadia, CA; Stanley Hasiak, Kapolei, HI; Dalton Hilliard, Honolulu, HI; Jared Koster, Norco, CA; Taniela Maka, Long Beach, CA; Stan McKay, Long Beach, CA; Marlon Pollard, San Bernardino, CA; Morrell Presley, Carson, CA; Sheldon Price, La Puente, CA; Xavier Su'a-Filo, Provo, UT; Iuta Tepa, Long Beach, CA; Damien Thigpen, Manassas, VA. Two junior college signees, Ryan Taylor of Denison, TX and Eddie Williams of Walnut, CA picked the Bruins. With these signings, Scout.com's national recruiting rankings has placed the Bruins at No. 4 (tie), surpassing USC, which is rated #7.

== Spring practice ==
2009 spring practice schedule:

- Week one – April 2 (4:00 p.m.), April 3 (4:00 p.m.) and April 4 (11:00 a.m.)
- Week two – April 6 (4:00 p.m.), April 7 (4:00 p.m.), April 9 (4:00 p.m.) and April 11 (12:30 p.m.)
- Week three – April 13 (4:00 p.m.), April 14 (4:00 p.m.), April 16 (4:00 p.m.) and April 17 (4:00 p.m.)
- Week four – April 20 (4:00 p.m.), April 21 (4:00 p.m.), April 23 (4:00 p.m.) and April 25 (7:00 p.m. Spring Scrimmage at the Rose Bowl)

At spring practice, quarterback Kevin Craft battled with Kevin Prince and freshman Richard Brehaut for quarterback in 2009. Prince was selected by Coach Neuheisel as the starter.

== Pre-season practice ==
- Week one – August 10–14 (once a day), August 15 (twice a day)
- Week two – August 17–21 (twice a day on 17th, 19th and 21st)
- Scrimmage – August 22, 5:00 p.m., Drake Stadium

== Notes ==
- The Bosworth twins, Kyle and Korey, are back for another season, and they participated in the 2009 graduation ceremony.
- Also participating in UCLA's 2009 commencement ceremonies were Troy Aikman, former linebacker Marcus Reece and Kevin Craft. Former quarterback John Sciarra was the keynote speaker at the sociology department ceremony.
- Following the Spring scrimmage (April 26), Neuheisel announced the captains for the team: Reggie Carter and Alterraun Verner (defense) and Logan Paulsen and Terrence Austin (offense).
- Aundre Dean, Raymond Carter, Chris Forcier and Dominique Johnson have been given releases to transfer from UCLA to another school. Dean will attend TCU. Forcier transferred to Furman University.
- Coach Neuheisel participates in Coaches Tour 2009 to visit U.S. troops in Germany, Turkey, Iraq, Iraq, Kuwait, Djibouti, and Spain.
- Tight end Joseph Fauria transferred from Notre Dame to UCLA prior to the start of the season following an undisclosed university violation that would have sidelined him for the season.
- UCLA was ranked 24th by the Phil Steele pre-season poll.
- Defensive tackle Willie Mobley, formerly with Ohio State, is transferring to UCLA but was unable to enroll in the fall quarter. He said that he lacked the necessary credits. Former Colorado receiver Josh Smith has transferred to UCLA after two seasons.
- After winning the EagleBank Bowl game, Brian Price announced that he will enter the NFL draft and Xavier Su'a-Filo will go on a Mormon mission for two years.

== Schedule ==
Date	Time	Opponent	Site	TV	Result	Attendance
September 5	4:30 p.m.	San Diego State*	Rose Bowl; Pasadena, CA	FSNW	W 33–14	55,761
September 12	1:00 p.m.	at Tennessee*	Neyland Stadium; Knoxville, TN	ESPN	W 19–15	102,239
September 19	7:15 p.m.	Kansas State*	Rose Bowl; Pasadena, CA	FSN	W 23–9	67,311
October 3	12:30 p.m.	at Stanford	Stanford Stadium; Stanford, CA (rivalry)	ABC	L 16–24	41,525
October 10	12:30 p.m.	No. 13 Oregon	Rose Bowl; Pasadena, CA	ABC	L 10–24	77,819
October 17	12:30 p.m.	California	Rose Bowl; Pasadena, CA (rivalry)	ABC	L 26–45	67,317
October 24	3:30 p.m.	at No. 22 Arizona	Arizona Stadium; Tucson, AZ	FSNPT	L 13–27	51,440
October 31	1:00 p.m.	at Oregon State	Reser Stadium; Corvallis, OR	FSN	L 19–26	41,009
November 7	12:30 p.m.	Washington^{†}	Rose Bowl; Pasadena, CA	FSNPT	W 24–23	72,924
November 14	2:00 p.m.	at Washington State	Martin Stadium; Pullman, WA	FCS	W 43–7	25,661
November 21	1:00 p.m.	Arizona State	Rose Bowl; Pasadena, CA	FSN	W 23–13	46,151
November 28	7:00 p.m.	at No. 20 USC	Los Angeles Memorial Coliseum; Los Angeles, CA (Victory Bell)	FSN	L 7–28	85,713
December 29	1:30 p.m.	vs. Temple*	Robert F. Kennedy Memorial Stadium; Washington, DC (EagleBank Bowl)	ESPN	W 30–21	23,072
*Non-conference game; ^{†}Homecoming; Rankings from AP Poll and BCS Rankings after October 18 released prior to game; All times are in Pacific time

== Game summaries ==
=== San Diego State ===
	1	2	3	4	Total
Aztecs	14	0	0	0	14
Bruins	10	13	10	0	33

This was the season-opening game for both teams. Both San Diego State Offensive Coordinator Al Borges and Defensive Coordinator Rocky Long are former UCLA coaches, and Tony White, Aztecs cornerbacks coach, played and coached at UCLA. Free game tickets were given to firefighters and their families for fighting the "Station wildfire" at nearby Angeles National Forest.

Behind Rahim Moore’s three record-tying interceptions, UCLA Bruins defeated San Diego State 33–14. The Aztecs scored first on a 4-yard pass from Ryan Lindley to Matthe Kawulok. The Bruins’ Kai Forbath kicked a 49-yard field goal, but Lindley threw a 78-yard touchdown pass to Vincent Brown to give San Diego State a 14–3 lead in the first quarter.

Those were the final points for the Aztecs. Then the Bruins scored 30 unanswered points on Johnathan Franklin's 12-yard run in the first quarter, Derrick Coleman's 29-yard run and a 6-yard pass from Kevin Prince to Terrence Austin in the second quarter. In the third quarter, Kai Forbath kicked a 50-yard field goal and Alterraun Verner returned a blocked field goal for a 70-yard touchtown.

=== Tennessee ===
	1	2	3	4	Total
Bruins	3	7	9	0	19
Volunteers	10	0	0	5	15

Lane Kiffin replaced Phillip Fulmer as the head coach of the Vols on December 1, 2008. The 33-year-old Kiffin was an assistant coach at USC with Coach Norm Chow for a number of years.

Kai Forbath kicked four field goals to help the Bruins to a 19–15 victory at Tennessee. Rahim Moore again played an outstanding game with two interceptions. Chane Moline caught a 12-yard pass from Kevin Prince for the only UCLA touchdown. The Bruin defense kept the Tennessee team from the end zone for much of the game, allowing the Vols 208 total yards. Prince completed 11 of 23 passes for 101 yards.

Scoring for the Vols was Montario Hardesty (11-yard run), Daniel Lincoln (31, 28-yard field goals) and Dennis Rogan (safety), which was aided by two UCLA third-and-long penalties and a UCLA fumble. During the final minutes of the game, Prince had his right jaw broken. He was projected to be out for three to four weeks.

=== Kansas State ===
	1	2	3	4	Total
Wildcats	3	0	6	0	9
Bruins	7	6	0	10	23

This was the first meeting between the two teams. Kansas State had a 1–1 record going into the game, having lost to the Louisiana-Lafayette Ragin' Cajuns 17–15 the previous week. Bill Snyder came out of retirement to coach the Wildcats. Former wide receiver Mike Sherrard, who played for 10 years with the NFL, was the honorary game captain. Kevin Craft, last year's starter, took over at quarterback in relief of Kevin Prince, who fractured his jaw the previous week against Tennessee.

Craft passed for 186 yards and a touchdown to lead the Bruins to a 23–9 victory over the Wildcats. Freshman Johnathan Franklin rushed for a career-best 119 yards on 23 carries and Kai Forbath kicked three field goals in the victory. Craft completed 13 of 24 passes with one interception including a game-clinching 51-yard scoring pass to Terrence Austin with 6:18 remaining.

Josh Cherry kicked a 26-yard field goal in the first quarter and Daniel Thomas had a 7-yard run in the third quarter for the Wildcats (Ryan Doerr's PAT pass failed). UCLA's one lost fumble and eight penalties for 80 yards were the ugly part of the victory. The Wildcats had two fumbles and four penalties for 50 yards. Alterraun Verner had two interceptions and returned them for 47 yards for the Bruins.

=== Stanford ===
	1	2	3	4	Total
Bruins	3	3	0	10	16
Cardinal	7	7	10	0	24

Entering the game, the Bruins were the only undefeated team in the Pac-10 Conference. Toby Gerhart, the Cardinal's 237-pound tailback who had 138 yards against UCLA last year, was averaging 129 yards a game.

Kai Forbath kicked a 29-yard field goal after a fumble recovery to give the Bruins the early lead. Then Gerhart rushed for 5 yards for a touchdown for Stanford in the first quarter. Aided by a UCLA personal foul in the second quarter, Gerhart scored his second touchdown. A partially blocked punt allowed the Bruins to kick a field goal just before halftime.

Using a 46-yard trick play in the third quarter to put Stanford in the red zone, Gerhart scored his third touchdown from the five-yard line. Unable to contain Gerhart, UCLA allowed Nate Whitaker to kick a 29-yard field goal for a 24-6 Stanford lead. The Bruins began the fourth quarter with a Johnathan Franklin 1-yard touchdown run. Forbath's 35-yard field goal reduced the Cardinal lead to 8 with about four minutes left. With Stanford failing to move the ball, UCLA took over with 3 minutes left but were unable to make a comeback win.

=== Oregon ===
	1	2	3	4	Total
Ducks	0	0	21	3	24
Bruins	0	3	7	0	10

After losing their first game to then #14 Boise State, the Ducks had won four straight games, over Purdue, Utah, California and Washington State. At game time, UCLA was leading the series, 39–23, since 1928.

With a solid performance in the first half and taking a field goal lead into the locker room, the Bruins gave up three quick touchdowns within few minutes of the third quarter to give the Ducks their fifth win of the season. The Ducks scored on Kenjon Barner's 100-yard kickoff return, on Talmadge Jackson's 31-yard interception, and on Nate Costa's 20-yard pass to Jeff Maehl that was aided by a UCLA fumble.

The Bruins scored their only touchdown when Akeem Ayers intercepted a Costa pass in the back of the Rose Bowl north end zone by keeping his feet in bounds. Kai Forbath kicked a 52-yard field goal to give UCLA the early lead. Oregon's Rob Beard attempted a 51-yard field goal, which was blocked by Jerzy Siewierski. Mogan Flint kicked a 33-yard field goal for the Ducks in the fourth quarter.

=== California ===
	1	2	3	4	Total
Golden Bears	14	21	3	7	45
Bruins	7	13	6	0	26

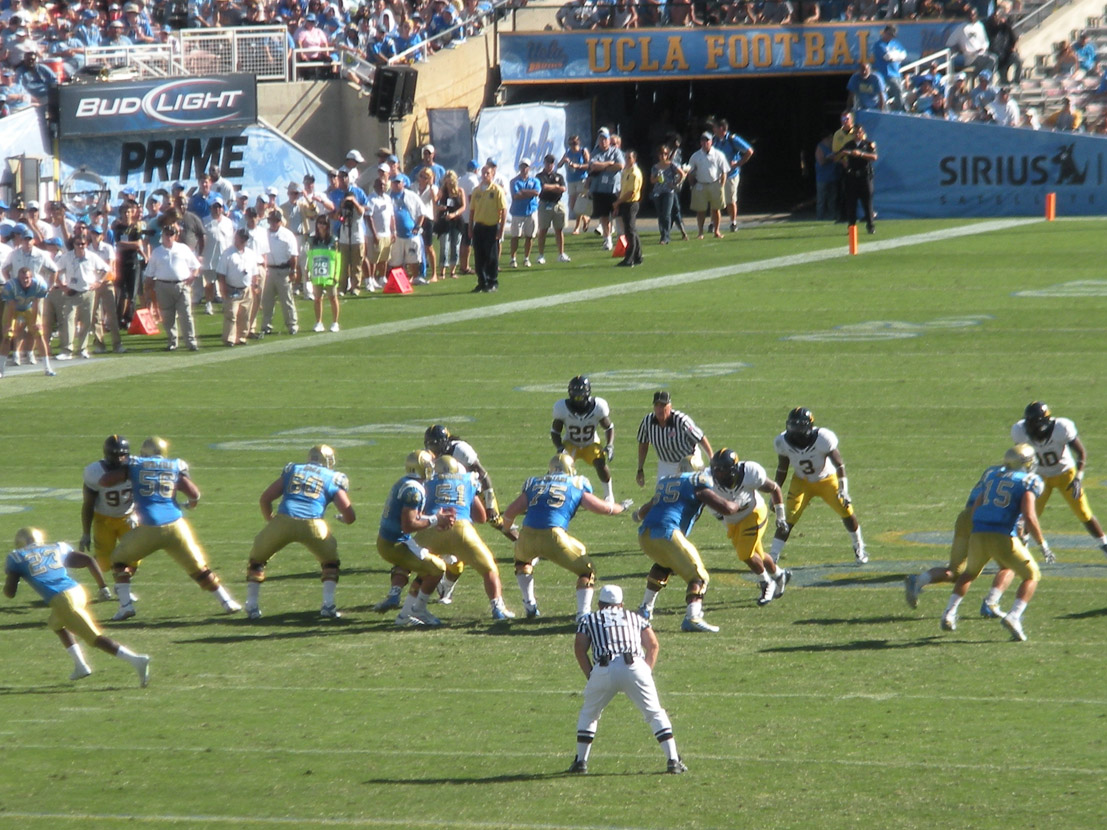
Quarterback Kevin Prince looks to pass during the Cal-UCLA game at the Rose Bowl

Both teams were looking for their first conference win, after losing the first two. Cal head coach Jeff Tedford was looking for his first road victory in Southern California, having lost all seven games to the Los Angeles schools as Cal's coach.

The Bears took advantage of the Bruins' mistakes and poor defensive performance to beat UCLA 45-26 for Tedford's first win in the Rose Bowl. Shane Vereen's 42 yard run and Marvin Jones' 43 yard pass from Kevin Riley were all the touchdowns the Bears needed in the first quarter. The scoring continued in the second quarter with Jahvid Best catching a 51-yard touchdown pass from Riley and running for a 93-yard touchdown.

Shane Vereen finished with 154 yards in 17 carries and Marvin Jones caught two TD passes from Kevin Riley in his four receptions for a total of 89 yards. Giorgio Tavecchio kicked a 24-yard field goal in the third quarter and Mychal Kendricks returned a 68-yard touchdown interception for Cal in the fourth quarter with 5 minutes remaining in the game.

Johnathan Franklin scored for UCLA with a 7-yard touchdown and a 74-yard touchdown, UCLA's longest scoring run in six years. As one of the best in the nation, Kai Forbath kicked four field goals, 24, 39, 46, and 35 yards. Quarterback Kevin Prince finished the game with 311 passing yards and that one interception in the fourth quarter. The Bruins had now lost three games in a row after starting the season with three victories, making it very difficult to have a winning season for Coach Rick Neuheisel.

To save $100,000 in transportation cost, Cal took a bus from Berkeley on Thursday for the Southland. The long bus ride didn't have any ill effect on the Golden Bears during the hot 3-hour 24-minute game.

Entertainment was provided by both schools' bands and high school bands from Southern California and one from Las Vegas.

=== Arizona ===
	1	2	3	4	Total
Bruins	0	3	10	0	13
Wildcats	13	0	14	0	27

In the first quarter, Arizona's first drive ended when Rahim Moore intercepted a Nick Foles pass. But in their second drive, Nick Foles passed to Juron Criner for a 41-yard touchdown to give the Wildcats a lead. After Arizona recovered a Bruin fumble, Grigsby rushed into the end zone for a 6-yard touchdown, extra point blocked.

Both Moore and Jerzy Siewierski intercepted a Wildcats pass in the second quarter. Kai Forbath kicked a 53-yard field goal to put UCLA on the board before the half. UCLA's Datone Jones recovered a Foles fumble and Forbath kicked a field goal to begin the third quarter. Kevin Craft came in to replace Kevin Prince in UCLA's second possession, but Christian Ramirez fumbled the ball to Arizona, which led to the Wildcats' third touchdown, a Nick Foles 25-yard pass to Juron Criner. Tony Dye recovered a Wildcats fumble and ran in for a 28-yard UCLA touchdown. Late in the third quarter, Nick Booth rushed for 6 yards for a score to give Arizona a 27–13 lead.

In the fourth quarter, the Bruins were unable to do anything and lost their fourth game in a row.

=== Oregon State ===
	1	2	3	4	Total
Bruins	0	0	3	16	19
Beavers	3	13	3	7	26

Justin Kahut kicked two field goals, 48 yards and 42 yards, to give the Beavers a 6-point lead. Oregon State increased its lead to 13 when Jacquizz Rodgers passed to Brady Camp for a 14-yard touchdown. Kahut kicked another field goal to give the Beavers a 16–0 lead at the half.

UCLA got on the board on Kai Forbath's 24-yard field goal in the third quarter. Kahut's fourth field goal attempt was short. Kahut kicked his fourth field goal (31 yards) in the fourth quarter to give the Beavers a 19–3 lead. A 58-yard pass to Nelson Rosario from Kevin Prince, combined with a 2-point conversion to Rosario, put UCLA back in the game, behind by only 8 points. Then Taylor Embree caught a touchdown pass from Prince and Johnathan Franklin caught a conversion pass to tie the game for the Bruins with 2 minutes left. But James Rodgers ran into the end zone for an Oregon State touchdown on a drive of 7 plays and 70 yards. UCLA took over the ball with 44 seconds remaining in the game and failed to make a complete comeback. The Bruins lost their fifth game in a row after winning their first three.

=== Washington ===
	1	2	3	4	Total
Huskies	10	6	7	0	23
Bruins	14	0	7	3	24

For this Homecoming game, the Bruins donned throwback jerseys, the 1967-style jerseys worn by honorary captain Gary Beban's team. The game was also the UCLA Veterans and Armed Forces Appreciation Day.

Though they had five turnovers in the game, the Bruins did not lose their sixth conference game in a row. Kai Forbath kicked a 27-yard field goal early in the final period to win the game for the Bruins. Kevin Prince completed 13 of 17 passes for 212 yards and Kevin Craft had 10 of 14 completions for 159 yards. Both threw an interception. Wide receiver Nelson Rosario had seven receptions for 111 yards.

With the Huskies down by a point, Erik Folk missed a 38-yard field goal attempt in the fourth quarter. Folk kicked three field goals, two in the second quarter, and Jermaine Kearse scored two pass-touchdowns in the game. Jake Locker completed 23 of 40 passes for 235 yards for Washington. Coach Rick Neuheisel still has not lost to his former teams, Colorado and Washington.

=== Washington State ===
	1	2	3	4	Total
Bruins	14	12	3	14	43
Cougars	0	0	7	0	7

After an interception, the Bruins scored on a pass touchdown from Kevin Prince to Taylor Embree on their first offensive play.

=== Arizona State ===
	1	2	3	4	Total
Sun Devils	7	0	0	6	13
Bruins	7	13	0	3	23

Andy Meyers, former offensive guard on UCLA's Pac-10 championship teams of 1997 and 1998, was the honorary captain for this Senior Day game. Eighteen seniors were playing in their last home game: DL Chinonso Anyanwu, WR Terrence Austin, DL Korey Bosworth, LB Kyle Bosworth, LB Reggie Carter, QB Kevin Craft, OL Nick Ekbatani, WR Gavin Ketchum, RB Chane Moline, TE Ryan Moya, TE Logan Paulsen, QB Osaar Rasshan, RB Craig Sheppard, DL Jerzy Siewierski, FB Trevor Theriot, CB Alterraun Verner, DL Jess Ward, DB Aaron Ware.

=== USC ===
	1	2	3	4	Total
Bruins	0	0	0	7	7
Trojans	7	0	7	14	28

This was the UCLA–USC rivalry game for the Victory Bell. Both teams wore home jerseys, in a tradition that had been restarted the previous year. The Bruins wore their 1966 throwback powder blue jerseys. The Trojans defeated the Bruins 28–7. With the Trojans leading 21–7 after a touchdown with 1:30 in the fourth quarter, and having possession of the ball after UCLA turned it over on downs, Coach Neuheisel called a timeout to stop the clock. The Trojans immediately connected on a 48-yard pass play for the fourth touchdown.

=== EagleBank Bowl ===
UCLA played Temple at the 2009 EagleBank Bowl at RFK Stadium in Washington, D.C. The bowl game was scheduled to start at 4:30 p.m. US EST on Tuesday, December 29, 2009. Navy defeated Army, allowing UCLA to play in its first bowl game since the 2007 Las Vegas Bowl.

	1	2	3	4	Total
Bruins	7	3	7	13	30
Owls	7	14	0	0	21

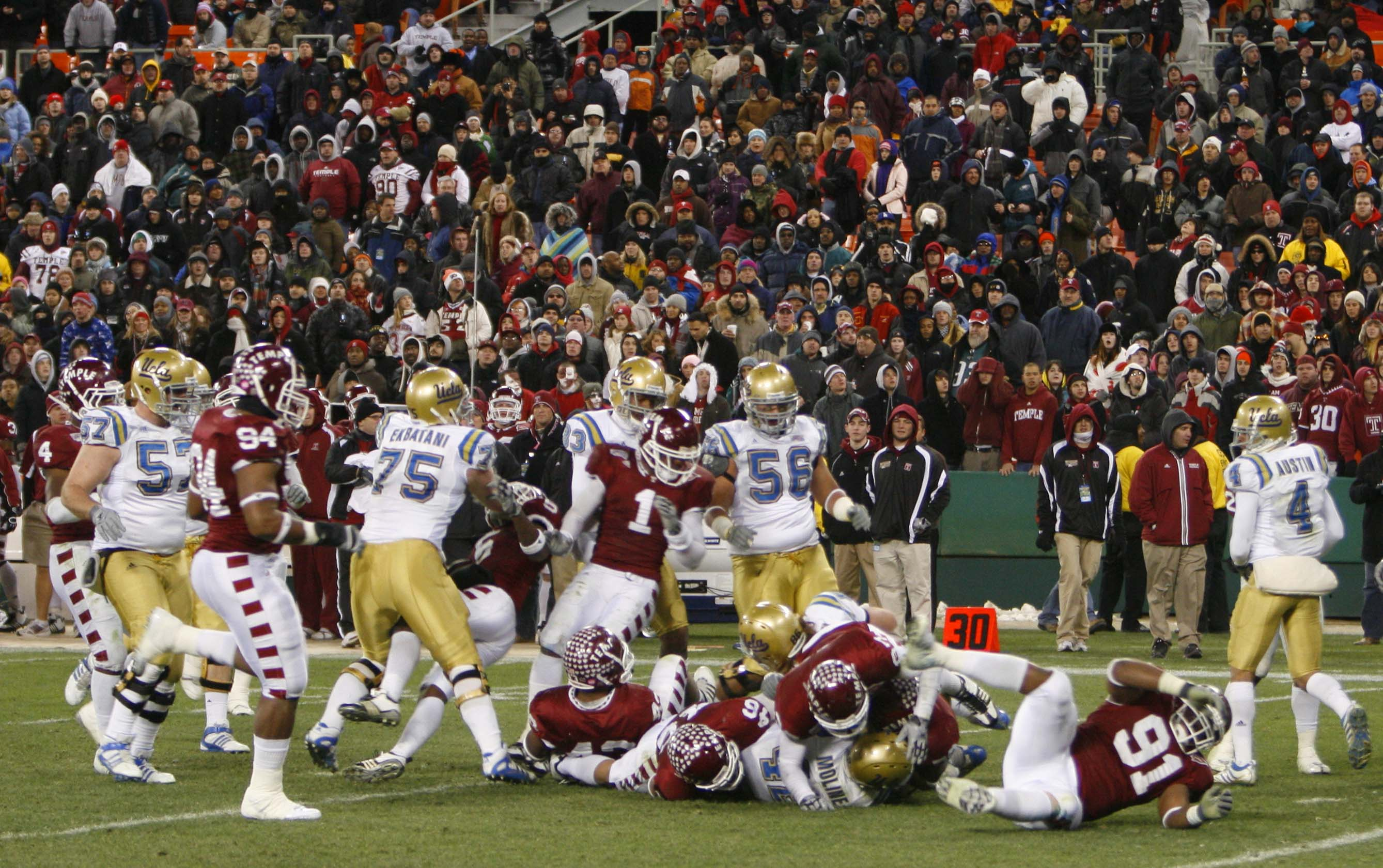

The Temple Owls were making their first bowl game in 30 years, but it was ruined by the UCLA Bruins. The game time temperature started at freezing, with significant windchill, and only decreased from there. This led notable Temple alum Bill Cosby to flaunt his Owls' distinct weather advantage.

The teams traded touchdowns early, but Temple built a big lead early, thanks to the play of the running back tandem of Bernard Price and Matt Brown. After trailing 21–10 at the half, UCLA converted a 4th and 1 pass to Terrence Austin into a touchdown to pull within 4. The game was won in the 4th quarter with a field goal by Kai Forbath, a 2-yard interception touchdown by Akeem Ayers, a two-point PAT catch by Nelson Rosario from Kevin Prince, and a safety from a bad snap on a Temple punt. Akeem Ayers was the MVP with several key tackles and the game-winning score, in which he fell attempting a pass rush, and was able to get up just in time to intercept the pass at the line of scrimmage and score easily.

== Awards and honors ==
- At their annual awards banquet at the Hyatt Century Plaza Hotel, running back Chane Moline, safety Rahim Moore and defensive tackle Brian Price were selected winners of UCLA's Henry R. "Red" Sanders Award for most valuable players. Tight end Logan Paulsen was awarded the Jackie R. Robinson Award for the highest scholarship of a senior player.

American Football Coaches Association (AFCA) Coaches' All-Americans First Team:

- Kai Forbath, PK; Brian Price, DT

All-Pacific-10 Conference teams

- Pat Tillman Defensive Player of the Year: Brian Price, DT
- First Team: LB, Reggie Carter; PK, Kai Forbath; DB, Rahim Moore; DL, Brian Price; DB, Alterraun Verner
- Second Team: KOR, Terrence Austin; P, Jeff Locke
- Honorable mention: OLB, Akeem Ayers; OLB Kyle Bosworth; SE, Nelson Rosario; OT, Xavier Su'a-Filo

Lou Groza Collegiate Place-Kicker Award

- Kai Forbath, the 2009 Lou Groza Collegiate Place-Kicker Award winner

Walter Camp Football Foundation All-America

- Place kicker Kai Forbath, first team All-America
- Defensive tackle Brian Price, second-team All-America
- Safety Rahim Moore, second-team All-America

== Coaches ==
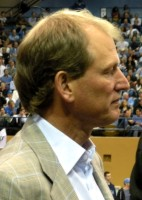
Head coach Rick Neuheisel

- Rick Neuheisel - Head Coach
- Chuck Bullough - Def. Coordinator/Linebackers
- Norm Chow - Offensive Coordinator
- Frank Gansz Jr. - Special Teams
- Todd Howard - Defensive Line
- Tim Hundley - Secondary
- Carnell Lake - Cornerbacks
- Reggie Moore - Wide Receivers
- Wayne Moses - Running Backs
- Bob Palcic - Offensive Line
- Philip Rauscher - Graduate Assistant/Offense
- Clark Lea - Graduate Assistant/Defense

== Bibliography ==
- UCLA Bruins football media guide 2008 Edition (preseason information)
