= 2009 Temple Owls football team =

American college football season

2009 Temple Owls football

MAC East Division co-champion

EagleBank Bowl, L 21–30 vs. UCLA
- Conference: Mid-American Conference
- East
- Record: 9–4 (7–1 MAC)
- Head coach: Al Golden (4th season)
- Offensive coordinator: Matt Rhule (2nd season)
- Offensive scheme: Pro spread
- Defensive coordinator: Mark D'Onofrio (4th season)
- Base defense: 4–3
- Home stadium: Lincoln Financial Field

2009 Mid-American Conference football standings
	Conf.			Overall
Team	W		L	W		L
East Division
Ohio xy	7	–	1	9	–	5
Temple x	7	–	1	9	–	4
Bowling Green	6	–	2	7	–	6
Kent State	4	–	4	5	–	7
Buffalo	3	–	5	5	–	7
Akron	2	–	6	3	–	9
Miami (OH)	1	–	7	1	–	11
West Division
No. 23 Central Michigan x$	8	–	0	12	–	2
Northern Illinois	5	–	3	7	–	6
Western Michigan	4	–	4	5	–	7
Toledo	3	–	5	5	–	7
Ball State	2	–	6	2	–	10
Eastern Michigan	0	–	8	0	–	12
Championship: Central Michigan 20, Ohio 10
$ – Conference champion; x – Division champion/co-champions; y – Championship game participant; Rankings from AP Poll

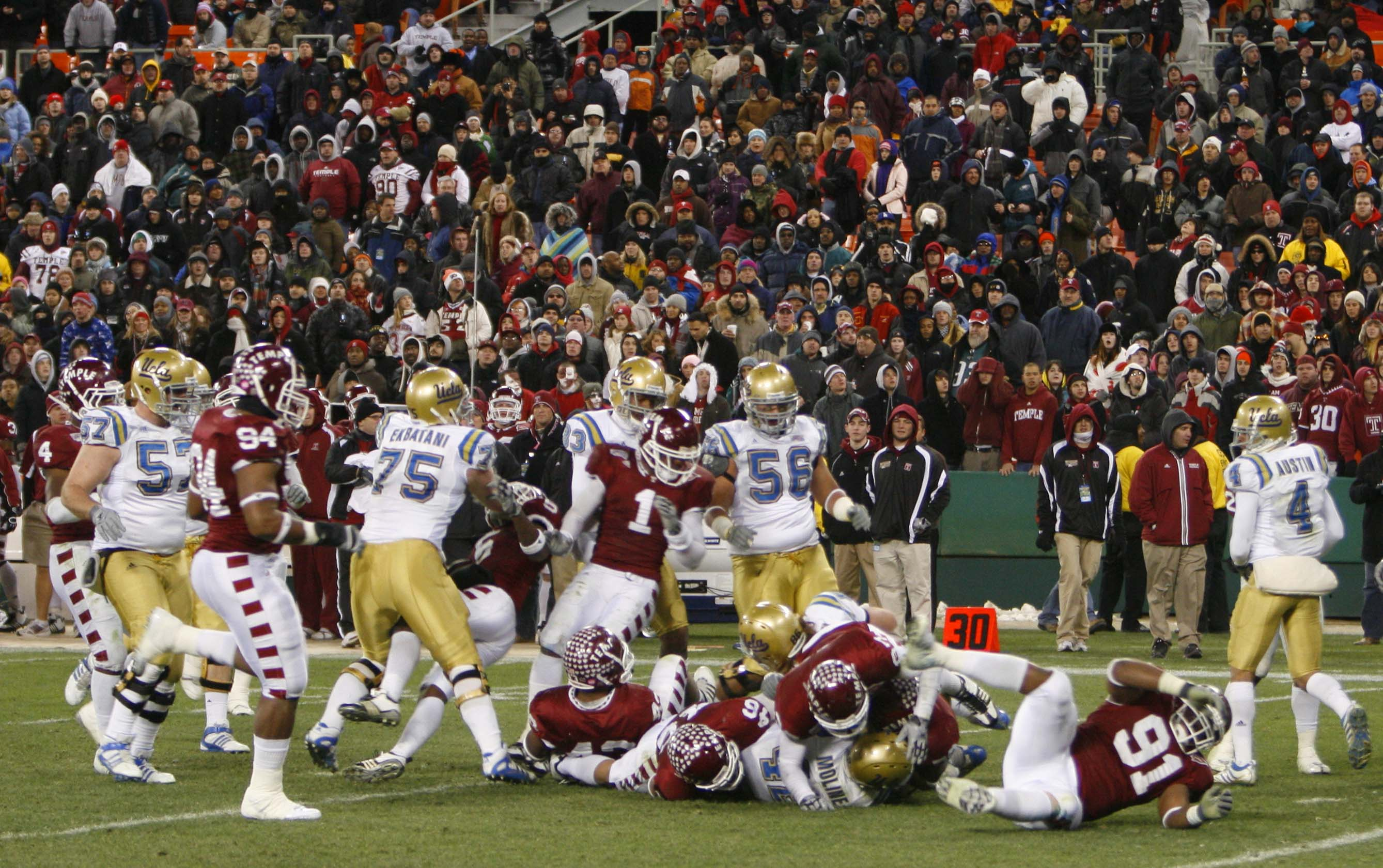
At the 2009 EagleBank Bowl

The 2009 Temple Owls football team represented Temple University in the college 2009 NCAA Division I FBS football season. Temple competed as a member of the Mid-American Conference (MAC) East Division. The team was coached by Al Golden and played their homes game in Lincoln Financial Field.

The Owls finished the season 9–4, 7–1 in conference play to be co–champions of the MAC East Division and were invited to the EagleBank Bowl where they lost to UCLA 30–21. This was the Owls first bowl game since the Garden State Bowl in 1979.

== Before the season ==
=== Recruiting ===
College recruiting information (2009)
Name	Hometown	School	Height	Weight	40^{‡}	Commit date
Cody Bohler; OL	Somerville, New Jersey	Immaculata HS	6 ft 7 in (2.01 m)	300 lb (140 kg)	–	Nov 9, 2008
Cody Bohler; OL	Recruit ratings: Scout: Rivals: (75)					
Levi Brown; DT	Bethlehem, Pennsylvania	Liberty HS	6 ft 3 in (1.91 m)	312 lb (142 kg)	5.1	Jun 28, 2008
Levi Brown; DT	Recruit ratings: Scout: Rivals: (40)					
Blaze Caponegro; RB	Wall, New Jersey	Wall HS	6 ft 1 in (1.85 m)	205 lb (93 kg)	–	Dec 16, 2008
Blaze Caponegro; RB	Recruit ratings: Scout: Rivals: (40)					
Chris Coyer; QB	Vienna, Virginia	Oakton HS	6 ft 3 in (1.91 m)	208 lb (94 kg)	4.64	Jan 14, 2009
Chris Coyer; QB	Recruit ratings: Scout: Rivals: (40)					
Kadeem Custis; DT	Philadelphia, Pennsylvania	St. John Neumann HS	6 ft 4 in (1.93 m)	275 lb (125 kg)	5	Dec 23, 2008
Kadeem Custis; DT	Recruit ratings: Scout: Rivals: (40)					
Justin Gildea; DB	Hollidaysburg, Pennsylvania	Hollidaysburg Area SHS	5 ft 10 in (1.78 m)	175 lb (79 kg)	4.49	Oct 27, 2008
Justin Gildea; DB	Recruit ratings: Scout: Rivals: (40)					
Elijah Grant; OL	Piscataway, New Jersey	Piscataway Township HS	6 ft 5 in (1.96 m)	340 lb (150 kg)	–	Jan 28, 2009
Elijah Grant; OL	Recruit ratings: Scout: Rivals: (40)					
Marcus Green; LB	Scotch Plains, New Jersey	Scotch Plains-Fanwood HS	6 ft 1 in (1.85 m)	225 lb (102 kg)	–	Jan 7, 2009
Marcus Green; LB	Recruit ratings: Scout: Rivals: (40)					
Aaron Hush; Delaware	Piscataway, New Jersey	Piscataway Township HS	6 ft 4 in (1.93 m)	211 lb (96 kg)	–	Jan 7, 2009
Aaron Hush; Delaware	Recruit ratings: Scout: Rivals: (40)					
Alex Jackson; Delaware	New Berlin, New York	Milford Academy	6 ft 4 in (1.93 m)	225 lb (102 kg)	–	Dec 16, 2008
Alex Jackson; Delaware	Recruit ratings: Scout: Rivals: (40)					
Kamal Johnson; Delaware	Willingboro, New Jersey	Willingboro HS	6 ft 3 in (1.91 m)	251 lb (114 kg)	–	Feb 3, 2009
Kamal Johnson; Delaware	Recruit ratings: Scout: Rivals: (40)					
Kwame Johnson; DB	Wayne, Pennsylvania	Valley Forge Military	5 ft 11 in (1.80 m)	185 lb (84 kg)	–	Jan 7, 2009
Kwame Johnson; DB	Recruit ratings: Scout: Rivals:					
Maurice Jones; DB	Chatham, Virginia	Fork Union Military Academy	5 ft 10 in (1.78 m)	178 lb (81 kg)	–	Dec 16, 2008
Maurice Jones; DB	Recruit ratings: Scout: Rivals: (40)					
Brandon McManus; K	Lansdale, Pennsylvania	North Penn SHS	6 ft 2 in (1.88 m)	170 lb (77 kg)	–	Nov 24, 2008
Brandon McManus; K	Recruit ratings: Scout: Rivals: (40)					
Deon Miller; WR	Fork Union, Virginia	Fork Union Military Academy	6 ft 6 in (1.98 m)	205 lb (93 kg)	4.7	Jan 28, 2009
Deon Miller; WR	Recruit ratings: Scout: Rivals: (73)					
Ryan Murray; OL	Chatham, Virginia	Hargrave Military Academy	6 ft 6 in (1.98 m)	325 lb (147 kg)	5.4	Sep 25, 2008
Ryan Murray; OL	Recruit ratings: Scout: Rivals: (75)					
Gary Onuekwusi; LB	Baltimore, Maryland	Paul Laurence Dunbar HS	6 ft 1 in (1.85 m)	215 lb (98 kg)	4.6	Jan 25, 2009
Gary Onuekwusi; LB	Recruit ratings: Scout: Rivals: (40)					
Andrew Opoku; WR	North Brunswick, New Jersey	North Brunswick Township HS	6 ft 4 in (1.93 m)	209 lb (95 kg)	4.67	Feb 4, 2009
Andrew Opoku; WR	Recruit ratings: Scout: Rivals: (73)					
Byron Parker; ATH	Virginia Beach, Virginia	Tallwood HS	5 ft 11 in (1.80 m)	173 lb (78 kg)	4.45	Dec 7, 2008
Byron Parker; ATH	Recruit ratings: Scout: Rivals: (75)					
Deonte Parker; DB	Quincy, California	Feather River	5 ft 11 in (1.80 m)	190 lb (86 kg)	–	Dec 19, 2008
Deonte Parker; DB	Recruit ratings: Scout: Rivals:					
Chris Parthemore; TE	Camp Hill, Pennsylvania	Cedar Cliff HS	6 ft 4 in (1.93 m)	220 lb (100 kg)	4.7	Oct 30, 2008
Chris Parthemore; TE	Recruit ratings: Scout: Rivals: (40)					
Shahid Paulhill; DT	Fork Union, Virginia	Fork Union Military Academy	6 ft 4 in (1.93 m)	275 lb (125 kg)	–	Dec 16, 2008
Shahid Paulhill; DT	Recruit ratings: Rivals: (40)					
Bernard Pierce; RB	Concorde Mills, Pennsylvania	Glen Mills	5 ft 10 in (1.78 m)	200 lb (91 kg)	–	Jan 5, 2009
Bernard Pierce; RB	Recruit ratings: Scout: Rivals: (40)					
Geoffrey Prather; LB	Valley Forge, Pennsylvania	Valley Forge Military College	6 ft 2 in (1.88 m)	195 lb (88 kg)	–	Dec 16, 2008
Geoffrey Prather; LB	Recruit ratings: Rivals: (40)					
Darryl Pringle; OL	Reading, Pennsylvania	Reading SHS	6 ft 4 in (1.93 m)	305 lb (138 kg)	–	Jul 3, 2008
Darryl Pringle; OL	Recruit ratings: Scout: Rivals: (40)					
Evangelos Regas; OL	Toms River, New Jersey	Toms River High – North HS	6 ft 4 in (1.93 m)	325 lb (147 kg)	–	Jul 3, 2008
Evangelos Regas; OL	Recruit ratings: Scout: Rivals: (77)					
Jerry Watters; WR	Cherry Hill, New Jersey	Camden Catholic	5 ft 10 in (1.78 m)	167 lb (76 kg)	4.57	Jun 26, 2008
Jerry Watters; WR	Recruit ratings: Scout: Rivals: (71)					
Jeffrey Whittingham; DT	Atlantic City, New Jersey	Atlantic City HS	6 ft 4 in (1.93 m)	285 lb (129 kg)	–	Jun 26, 2008
Jeffrey Whittingham; DT	Recruit ratings: Scout: Rivals: (73)					
Overall recruit ranking: Scout: 89 Rivals: 112
‡ Refers to 40-yard dash; Note: In many cases, Scout, Rivals, 247Sports, On3, and ESPN may conflict in their listings of height, weight and 40 time.; In these cases, the average was taken. ESPN grades are on a 100-point scale.; Sources: "Temple Commit List for 2009". Rivals.; "Football Recruiting: Temple". Scout.; "Temple Football Recruiting 2009". ESPN.; "Scout.com Team Recruiting Rankings". Scout.; "2009 Team Ranking". Rivals.com.

== Schedule ==
Date	Time	Opponent	Site	TV	Result	Attendance	Source
September 3	7:00 p.m.	No. 5 (FCS) Villanova*	Lincoln Financial Field; Philadelphia, PA (Mayor's Cup)		L 24–27	27,759	
September 19	12:00 p.m.	at No. 5 Penn State*	Beaver Stadium; University Park, PA	BTN	L 6–31	105,514	
September 26	12:00 p.m.	Buffalo	Lincoln Financial Field; Philadelphia, PA	ESPN Plus	W 37–13	13,949	
October 3	1:00 p.m.	at Eastern Michigan	Rynearson Stadium; Ypsilanti, MI		W 24–12	3,364	
October 10	1:00 p.m.	Ball State	Lincoln Financial Field; Philadelphia, PA		W 24–19	13,420	
October 17	1:00 p.m.	Army*	Lincoln Financial Field; Philadelphia, PA		W 27–13	14,275	
October 24	7:00 p.m.	at Toledo	Glass Bowl; Toledo, OH		W 40–24	16,334	
October 31	3:30 p.m.	at Navy*	Navy–Marine Corps Memorial Stadium; Annapolis, MD	CBSCS	W 27–24	28,305	
November 5	7:30 p.m.	Miami (OH)	Lincoln Financial Field; Philadelphia, PA	ESPNU	W 34–32	13,827	
November 13	8:30 p.m.	at Akron	InfoCision Stadium–Summa Field; Akron, OH	ESPNU	W 56–17	10,927	
November 21	1:00 p.m.	Kent State	Lincoln Financial Field; Philadelphia, PA		W 47–13	21,046	
November 27	11:00 a.m.	at Ohio	Peden Stadium; Athens, OH	ESPNU	L 17–35	14,135	
December 29	4:30 p.m.	vs. UCLA*	Robert F. Kennedy Memorial Stadium; Washington, DC (EagleBank Bowl)	ESPN	L 21–30	23,072	
*Non-conference game; Rankings from AP Poll released prior to the game; All times are in Eastern time

== Game summaries ==
=== Villanova ===
	1	2	3	4	Total
Wildcats	0	0	14	13	27
Owls	0	10	7	7	24

Temple blew a 10-point lead over the Wildcats to ultimately lose 27–24 to the Villanova Wildcats to open the year on a sour note. This game was similar to many games last year where Temple would have a lead but be unable to finish off an opponent, such as the overtime loss to Navy and the Hail Mary loss to Buffalo last year. After a scoreless first quarter, Temple got a 10–0 halftime lead, then made it a 17–7 lead midway through the third after each scored, and Villanova scored to make it 17–14, but Temple would score again early in the 4th quarter to make it 24–14, but Villanova would shut out the Owls the rest of the way, making it 24–17 on a field goal soon after, late in the game Villanova tied it up, and just as Temple was about to go for the win, a turnover led to a Villanova field goal that gave them their first win of the year and put Temple at 0–1 to start the new year. It was also Villanova's first win against a I-A opponent since 2003, ironically it Temple. Villanova leads the series.

=== Penn State ===
	1	2	3	4	Total
Owls	3	0	3	0	6
Nittany Lions	7	14	3	7	31

Temple hadn't beaten Penn State since 1941, and that nearly 70-year losing streak remained intact, but the Owls kept themselves in the game early with a field goal and successful onside kick. Afterwards, the momentum they had gained was quickly lost as Penn State made it 21–3 at halftime and 24–6 after three. Penn State put the game out of reach with a touchdown run by Stephon Green. Soon afterwards, Penn State put their backups in, but were unable to score any more points. With the 6–31 loss, this now makes four straight games that the Owls have failed to score at least a touchdown on Penn State.

Scoring summary

1st Quarter

- 07:35 PSU Shuler 1-yard pass from Clark (Wagner kick) 0–7 PSU
- 00:00 TEM McManus 25-yard field goal 3–7 PSU

2nd Quarter

- 05:46 PSU Royster 7-yard run (Wagner kick) 3–14 PSU
- 01:03 PSU Moye 4-yard pass from Clark (Wagner kick) 3–21 PSU

3rd Quarter

- 12:06 TEM McManus 35-yard field goal 6–21 PSU
- 06:23 PSU Wagner 27-yard field goal 6–24 PSU

4th Quarter

- 11:25 Green 3-yard run (Wagner kick) 6–31 PSU

=== Buffalo ===
	1	2	3	4	Total
Bulls	0	6	0	7	13
Owls	3	17	10	7	37

With the huge blowout win over Buffalo, Temple was able to get revenge for the previous two years, including a last second loss on a Hail Mary and a blowout loss the year before. This also gave Temple their first win of the year.

Scoring summary

1st Quarter

- 6:02 TEMPLE McManus 35-yard field goal 0–3 TEMPLE

2nd Quarter

- 12:38 UB Principe 36-yard field goal 3–3
- 10:14 UB Principe 32-yard field goal 6–3 UB
- 10:01 TEMPLE Nixon 92-yard kickoff return (McManus kick) 6–10 TEMPLE
- 2:59 TEMPLE McManus 22-yard field goal 6–13 TEMPLE
- 0:07 TEMPLE Joseph 95-yard interception return (McManus kick) 6–20 TEMPLE

3rd Quarter

- 11:34 TEMPLE Rodriguez 5-yard pass from Charlton (McManus kick) 6–27 TEMPLE
- 8:17 TEMPLE McManus 33-yard field goal 6–30 TEMPLE

4th Quarter

- 11:56 UB Rivers 6-yard pass from Maynard (Principe kick) 13–30 TEMPLE
- 9:23 TEMPLE Pierce 18-yard run (McManus kick) 13–37 TEMPLE

=== Eastern Michigan ===
	1	2	3	4	Total
Owls	14	7	0	3	24
Eagles	0	6	0	6	12

With the 24–6 win over Eastern Michigan, the Owls were now .500 and undefeated in the MAC.

=== Ball State ===
	1	2	3	4	Total
Cardinals	0	0	13	6	19
Owls	10	0	7	7	24

Despite going 12–2 last year and being ranked as high as #12, the Ball State Cardinals remained winless this year after giving Temple a game that appeared closer than it really was. Temple took a 10–0 lead, but fell behind 13–10, but soon retook the lead and would hold on for the 24–19 win, giving up a meaningless touchdown on the game's final play to make the game look like a nailbiter. Temple also was 3–0 in the MAC and 3–2 overall with the win.

Scoring summary

1st Quarter

- 07:12 TEMPLE McManus 27-yard field goal 0–3 TEMPLE
- 04:47 TEMPLE Nixon 28-yard pass from Charlton (McManus kick) 0–10 TEMPLE

3rd Quarter

- 10:59 BSU Gibson 50-yard pass from Page (McGarvey kick) 7–10 TEMPLE
- 08:47 BSU Williams 0-yard fumble recovery (McGarvey kick failed) 13–10 BSU
- 04:48 TEMPLE Pierce 2-yard run (McManus kick) 13–17 TEMPLE

4th Quarter

- 03:29 TEMPLE Pierce 3-yard run (McManus kick) 13–24 TEMPLE
- 00:00 BSU Ifft 2-yard pass from Page 19-24 TEMPLE

=== Army ===
	1	2	3	4	Total
Black Knights	0	3	10	0	13
Owls	7	6	0	14	27

Scoring summary

1st Quarter

- TEMPLE TD 10:43 Bernard Pierce 1 Yd Run (Brandon Mcmanus Kick) 0–7

2nd Quarter

- TEMPLE TD 13:17 Jason Harper 37 Yd Pass From Vaughn Charlton (Pat Failed) 0–13
- ARMY FG 02:11 Alex Carlton 24 Yd 3–13

3rd Quarter

- ARMY FG 07:50 Alex Carlton 23 Yd 6–13
- ARMY TD 04:06 Ali Villanueva 4 Yd Pass From Trent Steelman (Alex Carlton Kick) 13–13

4th Quarter

- TEMPLE TD 07:25 Steve Maneri 6 Yd Pass From Vaughn Charlton (Brandon Mcmanus Kick) 13–20
- TEMPLE TD 05:26 Kee-ayre Griffin 1 Yd Run (Brandon Mcmanus Kick) 13–27

=== Toledo ===
	1	2	3	4	Total
Owls	13	10	10	7	40
Rockets	7	10	0	7	24

Temple defeated a favored Toledo team 40–24 in the Glass Bowl. Like Temple, Toledo had improved greatly from last year.

=== Navy ===
	1	2	3	4	Total
Owls	0	14	3	10	27
Midshipmen	3	7	7	7	24

With this win, Temple became bowl eligible.

Scoring summary

1st Quarter

- NAVY FG 03:11 Joe Buckley 30 Yd 0–3

2nd Quarter

- TEMPLE TD 11:11 Bernard Pierce 68 Yd Run (Brandon Mcmanus Kick) 7–3
- NAVY TD 01:55 David Wright 3 Yd Punt Return (Joe Buckley Kick) 7–10
- TEMPLE TD 01:41 James Nixon 100 Yd Kickoff Return (Brandon Mcmanus Kick) 14–10

3rd Quarter

- TEMPLE FG 12:08 Brandon McManus 45 Yd 17–10
- NAVY TD 07:54 Vince Murray 5 Yd Run (Joe Buckley Kick) 17–17

4th Quarter

- NAVY TD 14:55 Kriss Proctor 2 Yd Run (Joe Buckley Kick) 17–24
- TEMPLE FG 12:02 Brandon McManus 21 Yd 20–24
- TEMPLE TD 02:41 Bernard Pierce 41 Yd Run (Brandon Mcmanus Kick) 27–24

=== Miami (OH) ===
	1	2	3	4	Total
RedHawks	3	10	0	19	32
Owls	14	7	10	3	34

Scoring summary

1st Quarter

- 11:20 TEMPLE Bernard Pierce 1 Yd Run (Brandon Mcmanus Kick) 0–7
- 07:57 MIAMI (Ohio) Trevor Cook 20 Yd 3–7
- 01:50 TEMPLE Vaughn Charlton 1 Yd Run (Brandon Mcmanus Kick) 3–14

2nd Quarter

- 05:21 TEMPLE Bernard Pierce 7 Yd Run (Brandon Mcmanus Kick) 3–21
- 03:41 MIAMI (Ohio) Armand Robinson 11 Yd Pass From Zac Dysert (Trevor Cook Kick) 10–21
- 00:11 MIAMI (Ohio) Trevor Cook 26 Yd 13–21

3rd Quarter

- 09:17 TEMPLE Brandon McManus 42 Yd 13–24
- 02:37 TEMPLE Bernard Pierce 14 Yd Run (Brandon Mcmanus Kick) 13–31

4th Quarter

- 13:35 MIAMI (Ohio) Steve Marck 24 Yd Pass From Zac Dysert (Trevor Cook Kick) 20–31
- 08:52 MIAMI (Ohio) Armand Robinson 14 Yd Pass From Zac Dysert (Two-Point Run Conversion Failed) 26–31
- 02:36 MIAMI (Ohio) Thomas Merriweather 2 Yd Run (Two-Point Pass Conversion Failed) 32–31
- 00:03 TEMPLE Brandon McManus 18 Yd 32–34

=== Akron ===
	1	2	3	4	Total
Owls	14	21	7	14	56
Zips	17	0	0	0	17

Scoring summary

1st Quarter

- TEMPLE TD 12:34 Michael Campbell 63 Yd Pass From Chester Stewart (Brandon Mcmanus Kick) 7–0
- AKRON TD 09:30 Andre Jones 9 Yd Pass From Patrick Nicely (Branko Rogovic Kick) 7–7
- AKRON FG 05:00 Branko Rogovic 45 Yd 7–10
- AKRON TD 03:06 Sean Fobbs Recovered Fumble In End Zone (Branko Rogovic Kick) 7–17
- TEMPLE TD 00:10 James Nixon 22 Yd Run (Brandon Mcmanus Kick) 14–17

2nd Quarter

- TEMPLE TD 06:15 Delano Green 66 Yd Punt Return (Brandon Mcmanus Kick) 21–17
- TEMPLE TD 01:06 Chester Stewart 8 Yd Run (Brandon Mcmanus Kick) 28–17
- TEMPLE TD 00:31 Bernard Pierce 2 Yd Run (Brandon Mcmanus Kick) 35–17

3rd Quarter

- TEMPLE TD 09:37 Joe Jones 24 Yd Pass From Chester Stewart (Brandon Mcmanus Kick) 42–17

4th Quarter

- TEMPLE TD 14:30 Chester Stewart 1 Yd Run (Brandon Mcmanus Kick) 49–17
- TEMPLE TD 11:31 Matt Brown 5 Yd Run (Brandon Mcmanus Kick) 56–17

=== Kent State ===
	1	2	3	4	Total
Golden Flashes	3	7	0	3	13
Owls	0	9	24	14	47

Scoring summary

1st Quarter

- KSU FG 08:58 Freddy Cortez 21 Yd 3–0

2nd Quarter

- TEMPLE TD 11:12 Evan Rodriguez 10 Yd Pass From Kevin Armstrong (Pat Blocked) 3–6
- KSU TD 04:48 Kendrick Pressley 6 Yd Pass From Spencer Keith (Freddy Cortez Kick) 10–6
- TEMPLE FG 00:17 Brandon McManus 24 Yd 10–9

3rd Quarter

- TEMPLE FG 10:41 Brandon McManus 28 Yd 10–12
- TEMPLE TD 09:00 Matt Brown 71 Yd Run (Brandon McManus Kick) 10–19
- TEMPLE TD 06:55 Kee-ayre Griffin 36 Yd Interception Return (Brandon McManus Kick) 10–26
- TEMPLE TD 01:38 Matt Brown 1 Yd Run (Brandon McManus Kick) 10–33

4th Quarter

- TEMPLE TD 13:56 Delano Green 52 Yd Punt Return (Brandon McManus Kick) 10–40
- TEMPLE TD 09:08 Delano Green 50 Yd Run (Brandon McManus Kick) 10–47
- KSU FG 04:22 Freddy Cortez 46 Yd 13–47

=== Ohio ===
	1	2	3	4	Total
Owls	0	10	7	0	17
Bobcats	7	6	13	9	35

Ohio defeated Temple, and by virtue of a tie-breaker, advanced to the MAC Championship Game. Temple still won a share of the MAC East Division.

=== EagleBank Bowl ===
The UCLA Bruins (6–6) played the Temple Owls (9–3) at the 2009 EagleBank Bowl at RFK Memorial Stadium in Washington, D.C. The bowl game was scheduled to start at 4:30 PM US EST on Tuesday, December 29, 2009. Temple was playing in its first bowl game since the 1979 Garden State Bowl and made only its third bowl appearance in school history. After a dominant first half, UCLA staged a second half rally, and defeated the Owls 30–21.

	1	2	3	4	Total
Bruins	7	3	7	13	30
Owls	7	14	0	0	21

== Personnel ==
=== Roster ===
As of 2009-08-21
Wide receivers: Ryan Alderman – Freshman; 8 Nyles Bynum – Junior; 10 Delano Green – Junior; 13 Josh Hutchison – Junior; 15 Dy'Onne Crudup – Senior; 18 Jason Harper – Senior; 19 Deione Sydnor-Robinson – (redshirt) Sophomore; 22 Matt Brown – Freshman; 23 James Nixon – Sophomore; 39 Matt Brookhart – Freshman; 80 C. J. Hammond – (redshirt) Freshman; 81 Deven Baker – (redshirt) Freshman; 84 Michael Campbell – Junior; 85 Vaughn Carraway – Freshman; Offensive line: David Kim – Freshman; 59 Jerry Barlow – (redshirt) Junior; 50 Jeff Whittingham – Freshman; 57 Marcus Brown – (redshirt) Junior; 61 Sean Pearson – Freshman; 62 Steve Ciocci – (redshirt) Freshman; 63 Derek Dennis – Junior; 66 Darryl Pringle – Freshman; 67 Matt Paul – (redshirt) Freshman; 68 Jeremy Schonbrunner – (redshirt) Sophomore; 69 Wayne Tribue – Sophomore; 70 Colin Madison – Junior; 71 Darius Morris – (redshirt) Junior; 72 Cody Bohler – Freshman; 73 Devin Tyler – (redshirt) Senior; 74 Evan Regas – Freshman; 75 Simon Ogunleye – Freshman; 76 Steve Caputo – Sophomore; 77 John Palumbo – (redshirt) Sophomore; 78 Sean Boyle – Sophomore; 79 Pat Boyle – Sophomore; Tight ends: Cody Booth – Freshman; Robert Feeley – (redshirt) Junior; Richard Fricke – (redshirt) Freshman; 44 Lawrence Turner – (redshirt) Freshman; 83 Chris Parthemore – Freshman; 86 Steve Maneri – Senior; 87 Anthony Pekarski – (redshirt) Junior; 88 Evan Rodriguez – (redshirt) Sophomore; 89 Matt Balasavage – (redshirt) Sophomore; 98 Alex Jackson – Freshman	Quarterbacks: Matt Falcone – Freshman; 7 Chester Stewart – (redshirt) Sophomore; 11 Chris Coyer – Freshman; 12 Vaughn Charlton – (redshirt) Junior; 13 Bryan Morris – Freshman; 14 Mike Gerardi – (redshirt) Sophomore; Running backs: 3 Lamar McPherson – (redshirt) Senior; 20 Kee-ayre Griffin – Sophomore; 24 Ahkeem Smith – Sophomore; 26 Joe Jones – (redshirt) Sophomore; 30 Bernard Pierce – Freshman; Fullbacks: 48 Zack Collins – (redshirt) Freshman; Defensive line: 2 Andre Neblett – Senior; 43 Adrian Robinson, Jr. – Sophomore; 45 Morris Blueford, Jr. – (redshirt) Sophomore; 52 Brian Sanford – Senior; 65 Dave Nwasike – (redshirt) Junior; 72 Grigory Frenk – (redshirt) Junior; 90 Cameron Wise – (redshirt) Freshman; 91 Elisha Joseph – Junior; 92 Shahid Paulhill – Freshman; 93 Kamal Johnson – Freshman; 94 Kadeem Custis – Freshman; 95 Morkeith Brown – Sophomore; 96 Muhammad Wilkerson – Sophomore; 97 Geoffrey Prather – Freshman; 99 Levi Brown – Freshman	Linebackers: Vince Tuzze – Freshman; 4 Alex Joseph – Senior; 31 Tahir Whitehead – Sophomore; 32 Quinten White, Jr. – Sophomore; 33 Blaze Caponegro – Freshman; 34 Zach Kane – Freshman; 36 Gary Onuekwusi – Freshman; 40 Jordan Martin – (redshirt) Junior; 41 Marcus Green – Freshman; 46 John Haley – Senior; 51 James Namude – (redshirt) Senior; 53 Stephen Johnson – (redshirt) Sophomore; 54 Dan Van Norton – Freshman; 56 Amara Kamara – Junior; 58 Elijah Joseph – Junior; Defensive backs: 1 Wilbert Brinson, Jr. – Senior; 5 Jaiquawn Jarrett – Junior; 6 Dominique Harris – (redshirt) Senior; 9 Anthony Ferla – (redshirt) Junior; 14 Ricky Ueberroth – (redshirt) Senior; 16 Maurice Jones – Freshman; 17 Marlin Terrell – Sophomore; 21 Jared Williams – (redshirt) Sophomore; 24 Mina Gould – Freshman; 25 Deonte Parker – Junior; 28 Marquise Liverpool – Junior; 29 Justin Gildea – Freshman; 35 Kwame Johnson – Freshman; 37 Kevin Kroboth – Sophomore; 39 Aaron Haas – Freshman; 42 Byron Parker – Freshman; 48 Matt Duncan – (redshirt) Freshman; Punters: 47 Jake Brownell – (redshirt) Senior; 49 Jeff Wathne – Junior; Kickers: 19 Brandon McManus – Freshman; 90 Ryan Novak – Junior
† Starter at position * Injured; will not play in 2009.

=== Coaching staff ===
Name	Position	Year at school
Al Golden	Head coach Special teams coordinator	4th
Mark D'Onofrio	Assistant head coach Defensive coordinator	4th
Matt Rhule	Offensive coordinator Quarterbacks coach	4th
Jared Backus	Linebackers coach	3rd
Andrew Dees	Offensive line coach	4th
Ed Foley	Tight ends coach Assistant offensive line coach Recruiting coordinator	2nd
Tyree Foreman	Running backs coach	3rd
Kevin M. Gilbride	Wide receivers coach	3rd
Randy Melvin	Defensive line coach	1st
Paul Williams	Defensive backs coach	4th
