= Akeem Ayers =

American football player (born 1989)

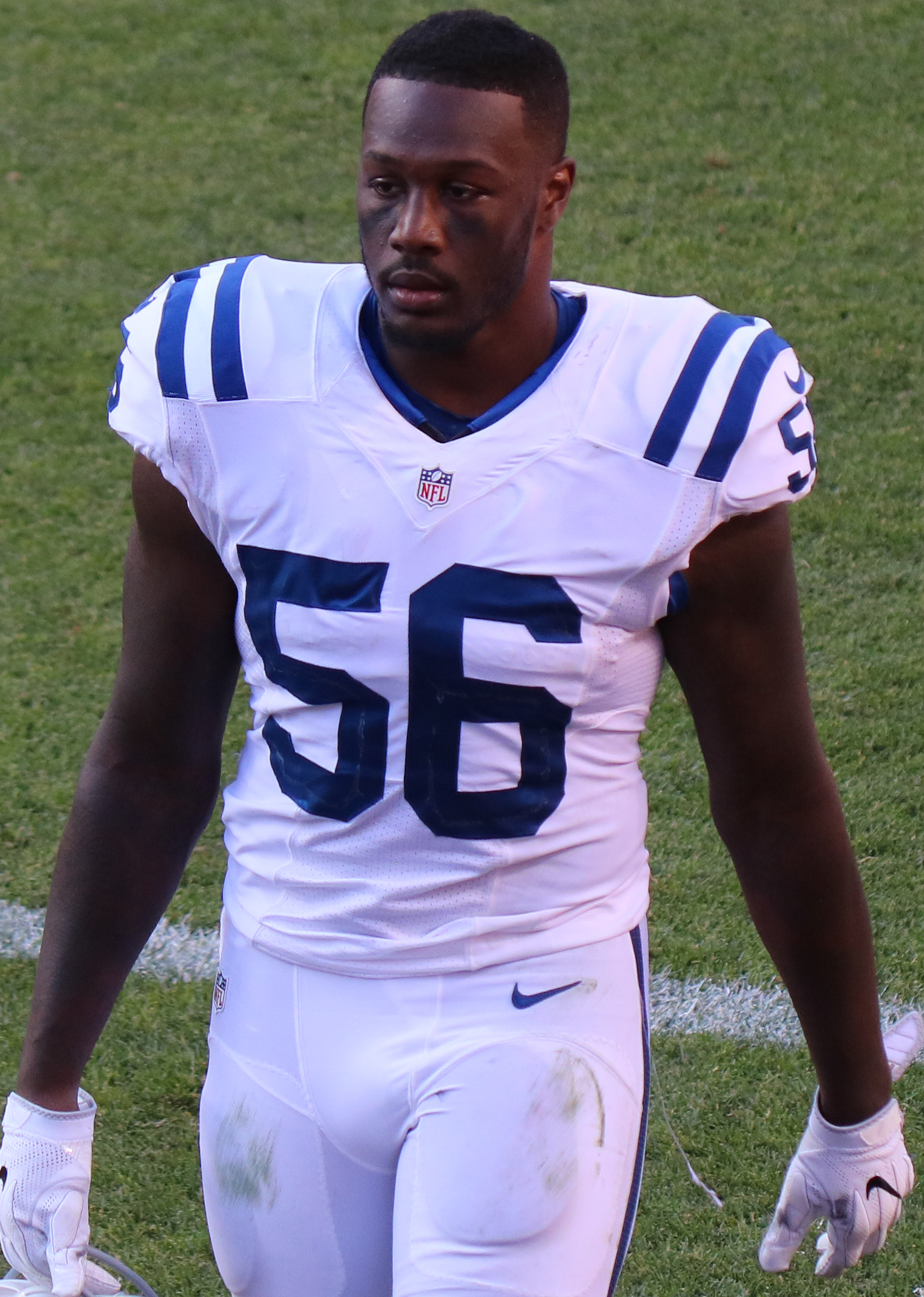
- Ayers with the Indianapolis Colts in 2016

No. 56, 55, 48
- Position: Linebacker

Personal information
- Born: July 10, 1989 (age 37); Los Angeles, California, U.S.
- Listed height: 6 ft 3 in (1.91 m)
- Listed weight: 247 lb (112 kg)

Career information
- High school: Verbum Dei (Los Angeles)
- College: UCLA
- NFL draft: 2011: 2nd round, 39th overall pick

Career history
- Tennessee Titans (2011–2014); New England Patriots (2014); St. Louis Rams (2015); Indianapolis Colts (2016); New York Giants (2017)

Awards and highlights
- Super Bowl champion (XLIX); Second-team All-American (2010); First-team All-Pac-10 (2010)

Career NFL statistics
- Total tackles: 323
- Sacks: 15.5
- Forced fumbles: 4
- Fumble recoveries: 4
- Interceptions: 4
- Defensive touchdowns: 1
- Stats at Pro Football Reference

Akeem Christopher Ayers (born July 10, 1989) is an American former professional football player who was a linebacker in the National Football League (NFL). He played college football for the UCLA Bruins, earning second-team All-American honors in 2010. Ayers was selected by the Tennessee Titans in the second round of the 2011 NFL draft. He has also played for the New England Patriots, St. Louis Rams, Indianapolis Colts, New York Giants. He won Super Bowl XLIX with the Patriots.

== Early life ==
Ayers attended Verbum Dei High School in Los Angeles, where he played for the Verbum Dei Eagles high school football team. He won a CIF championship during his senior season.

== College career ==
Ayers played for UCLA in college. Ayers is known for his athletic interceptions for touchdowns, one in the 2009 season against Oregon and one against Temple in the 2009 EagleBank Bowl. The latter was the game-winning score of the bowl game and helped him earn MVP honors. In a post-game interview, he admitted that he slipped, and was just trying to rush the passer on his game-changing play. As he got up, he saw the quarterback looking to pass, jumped up, and pulled in the pass for an interception and score.

On September 18, 2010, Ayers had a key interception against #23 Houston in UCLA's first win against a ranked opponent since 2008. The following week on September 25, he played a key role in the Bruins' second upset against a ranked opponent in a victory over No. 7 ranked Texas Longhorns 34–12 in front of more 101,000 fans in Austin, Texas. Ayers had a key interception, seven tackles, a forced fumble, and a sack. He was named Lott IMPACT Player of the Week on September 27. At the end of the 2010 season, his junior year, he entered for the NFL draft.

== Professional career ==
Pre-draft measurables
Height	Weight	Arm length	Hand span	Wingspan	40-yard dash	10-yard split	20-yard split	20-yard shuttle	Three-cone drill	Vertical jump	Broad jump	Bench press
6 ft 2 1/2 in (1.89 m)	254 lb (115 kg)	33 in (0.84 m)	9 in (0.23 m)	6 ft 7 3/4 in (2.03 m)	4.70 s	1.62 s	2.72 s	4.28 s	7.19 s	34.5 in (0.88 m)	9 ft 8 in (2.95 m)	22 reps
All values from NFL Combine/UCLA Pro Day

=== Tennessee Titans ===
Ayers was selected 39th overall by the Tennessee Titans in the 2011 NFL draft.

=== New England Patriots ===
On October 21, 2014, the Titans traded Ayers along with a seventh round draft pick in the 2015 NFL draft to the New England Patriots for a sixth round draft choice. In each of his first two games with New England, Ayers recorded a sack.

Ayers won Super Bowl XLIX with the Patriots after they defeated the Seattle Seahawks 28-24.

=== St. Louis Rams ===
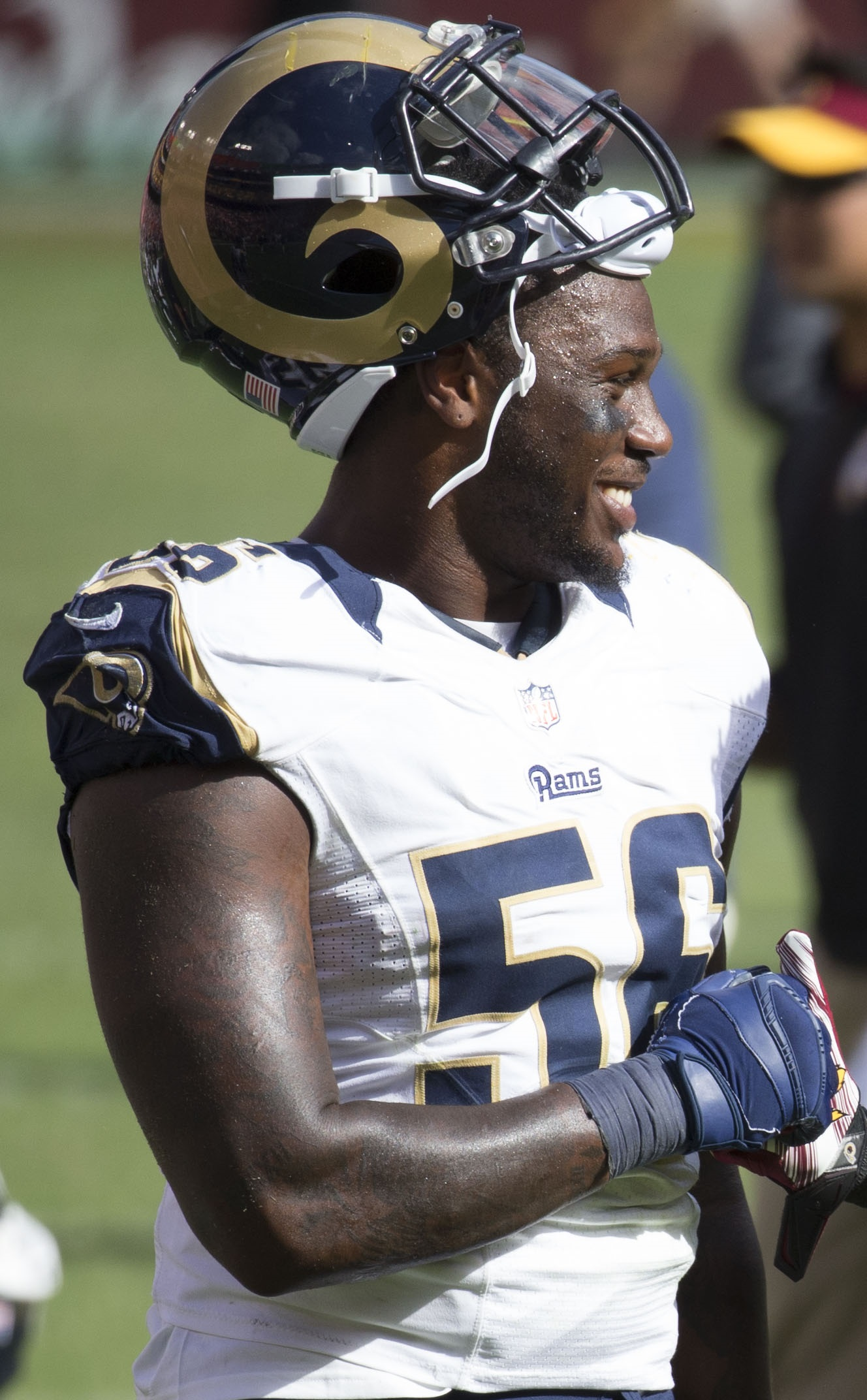
Ayers with the Rams in 2015.

On March 12, 2015, Ayers signed a two-year contract with the St. Louis Rams. On September 3, 2016, he was released by the Rams as part of final roster cuts.

=== Indianapolis Colts ===
Ayers signed a two-year contract with the Indianapolis Colts on September 6, 2016. On September 2, 2017, Ayers was released during final roster cuts.

=== New York Giants ===
On November 14, 2017, Ayers signed with the New York Giants.

== Career statistics ==
=== NFL ===
Legend
**Bold**	Career high

==== Regular season ====
Year	Team	Games		Tackles					Interceptions					Fumbles			
Year	Team	GP	GS	Cmb	Solo	Ast	Sck	TFL	Int	Yds	TD	Lng	PD	FF	FR	Yds	TD
2011	TEN	**16**	**16**	76	50	26	2.0	6	0	0	0	0	1	**1**	1	0	0
2012	TEN	**16**	13	**104**	**66**	**38**	**6.0**	**8**	**1**	2	0	2	**8**	**1**	0	0	0
2013	TEN	**16**	14	49	37	12	1.0	5	**1**	5	0	5	5	**1**	0	0	0
2014	TEN	2	0	3	1	2	0.0	0	0	0	0	0	0	0	0	0	0
2014	NWE	9	4	20	16	4	4.0	6	**1**	0	0	0	1	0	0	0	0
2015	STL	**16**	10	47	35	12	0.5	3	0	0	0	0	5	**1**	**3**	**45**	**1**
2016	IND	**16**	0	21	14	7	2.0	1	**1**	**25**	0	**25**	2	0	0	0	0
2017	NYG	6	0	3	2	1	0.0	0	0	0	0	0	0	0	0	0	0
		97	57	323	221	102	15.5	29	4	32	0	25	22	4	4	45	1

==== Playoffs ====
Year	Team	Games		Tackles					Interceptions					Fumbles			
Year	Team	GP	GS	Cmb	Solo	Ast	Sck	TFL	Int	Yds	TD	Lng	PD	FF	FR	Yds	TD
2014	NWE	**3**	0	**2**	**1**	**1**	0.0	0	0	0	0	0	0	0	0	0	0
		3	0	2	1	1	0.0	0	0	0	0	0	0	0	0	0	0

=== College ===
Year	Team	Total Tackles	Solo Tackles	Sacks	Tackles for Loss	Interceptions	DefTD
2008	UCLA	40	28	4.0	5.0	0	0
2009	UCLA	75	55	6	13.0	4	3*
2010	UCLA	68	45	4	10	2	0
Totals		183	128	13	29.5	6	3

*Had two interceptions for touchdown and one fumble recovery for touchdown
