= Jared Koster =

American gridiron football player (born 1991)

No. 44, 71
- Position: Linebacker

Personal information
- Born: April 11, 1991 (age 35); Kalamazoo, Michigan, U.S.
- Listed height: 6 ft 1 in (1.85 m)
- Listed weight: 230 lb (104 kg)

Career information
- College: UCLA
- NFL draft: 2015: undrafted

Career history
- Tampa Bay Buccaneers (2015); Montreal Alouettes (2016)
- Stats at CFL.ca

Jared Koster (born April 11, 1991) is an American former football linebacker. He played college football at UCLA.

== Tampa Bay Buccaneers ==
Koster was signed as an undrafted rookie on May 11, 2015.
