= 2009 EagleBank Bowl =

- 2nd EagleBank Bowl
UCLA Bruins	Temple Owls
(6–6)	(9–3)
Pac-10	MAC
30	21
Head coach: Rick Neuheisel	Head coach: Al Golden
	1	2	3	4	Total
UCLA	7	3	7	13	30
Temple	7	14	0	0	21
- Date: December 29, 2009
- Season: 2009
- Stadium: RFK Stadium
- Location: Washington, D.C.
- MVP: Akeem Ayers (UCLA)
- Referee: Todd Geerlings (Big Ten)
- Attendance: 23,072
- Payout: US$1,000,000 (each)

United States TV coverage
- Network: ESPN
- Announcers: Bob Wischusen (play-by-play); Brian Griese (color commentary); Rob Stone (sideline)
- Nielsen ratings: 1.9

The 2009 EagleBank Bowl was a college football bowl game. It marked the second edition of the EagleBank Bowl, played at RFK Stadium in Washington, D.C. The game, in which UCLA of the Pacific-10 Conference defeated Temple of the Mid-American Conference, 30–21, started at 4:30 p.m. US EST on Tuesday, December 29, 2009. The game was telecast on ESPN and was organized by the DC Bowl Committee, Inc., the Washington Convention and Sports Authority, and its title sponsor.

== Teams ==
The 2009 edition of the EagleBank Bowl was originally to match Army and the eighth team selected from the ACC. Army finished the regular season at 5–7 after failing to defeat rival Navy to become bowl eligible. Only seven teams from the ACC finished with bowl-qualifying regular season records (6–6 or better.)

=== Temple Owls ===
A number of teams were up for consideration. The matchup was originally planned to be Army vs. a team from the Atlantic Coast Conference. If Army were not bowl-eligible (at least 6–6), a team from Conference USA would have been selected as the opponent for the ACC team. All of the bowl-eligible teams from the ACC and Conference USA were selected by bowls with a higher selection priority. The Bowl was also under partnership with the MAC to select a team if neither an ACC or a C-USA team is available. Under this provision, the bowl selected the Temple Owls.

=== UCLA Bruins ===
With the 7–5 teams all selected from the Football Bowl Subdivision, the 6–6 teams from other conferences are available to be selected. Notre Dame was a likely choice, but the team would not participate in a bowl following the firing of Charlie Weis. The choice then ultimately fell to UCLA, which would take Army's spot if Army did not defeat Navy and finish 6–6. UCLA was permitted to practice for the bowl, per NCAA rules, since they were eligible to participate in a bowl.

Army was required to beat Navy on Saturday, December 12, 2009, in order to qualify for the bowl. Army fell short by losing 17–3 in the Army–Navy Game, thereby allowing UCLA (6–6) to play Temple (9–3).

== Game summary ==
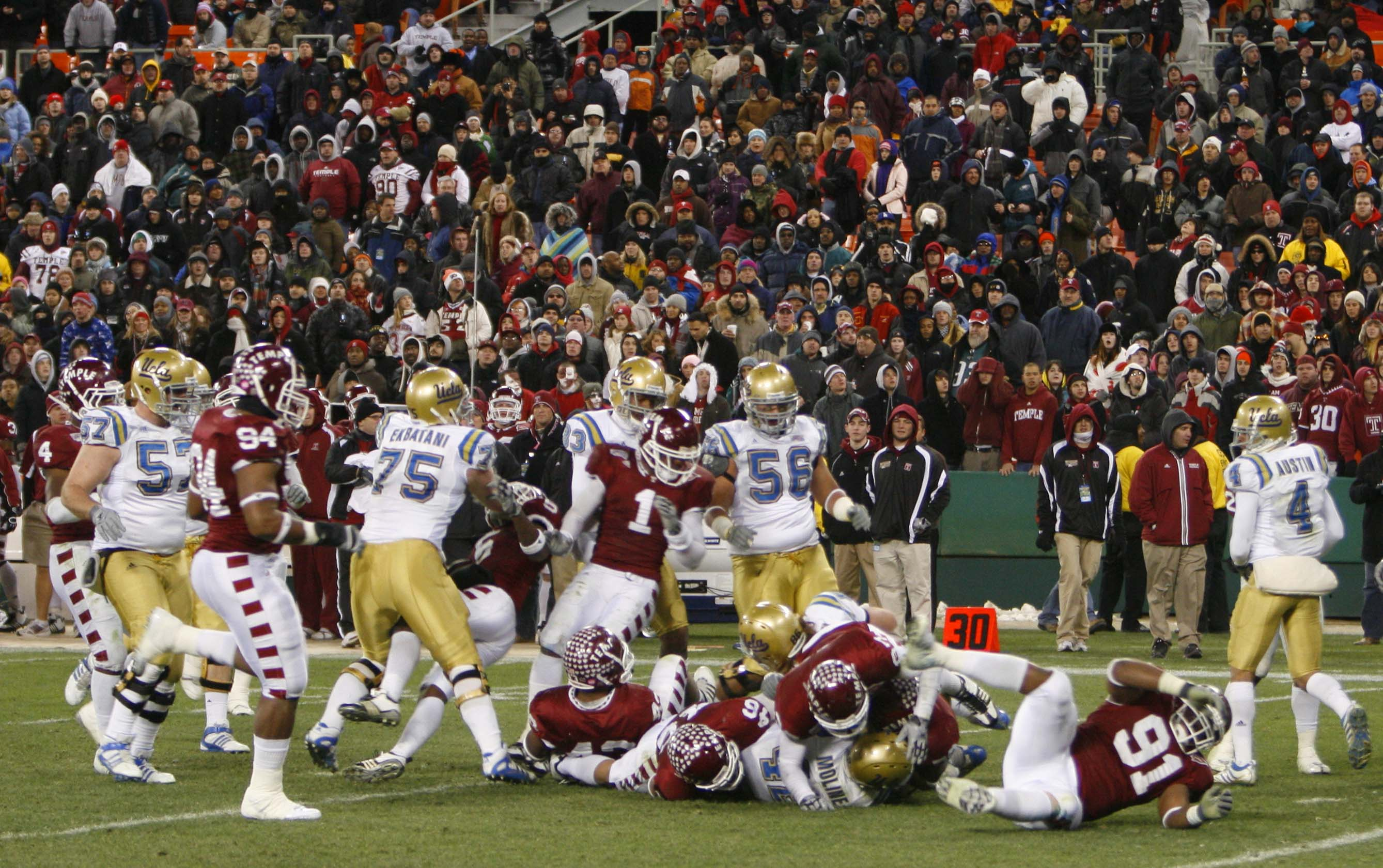
UCLA and Temple during the 2009 EagleBank Bowl

Temple wore their home cherry jerseys and UCLA wore their away white jerseys.

UCLA rallied from a 21-10 halftime deficit to defeat Temple for their first winning season in 3 years. Temple did not score in the second half of the game after star tailback Bernard Pierce left the game with an injured shoulder. Pierce had recorded 53 yards and a touchdown on 12 carries before his early exit. UCLA quarterback Kevin Prince completed 16 of 31 passes for 221 yards with two touchdowns and one interception. His counterpart, Vaughn Charlton, had more interceptions (two) than completed passes (one) in the second half. Bruins linebacker Akeem Ayers returned an interception 2 yards for a go-ahead touchdown in the fourth quarter and was named the game's MVP for his efforts.

The temperature was 32 degrees at kickoff with the wind chill at 19, and it only got colder as the evening wore on, leading many (including Temple alumnus Bill Cosby) to assume UCLA would struggle with the conditions. The game drew 23,072 to RFK Stadium, a decline of more than 5,000 from last year's inaugural game.

=== Scoring summary ===
Scoring Play	Score
1st Quarter
TEM — Steve Maneri 26-yard pass from Vaughn Charlton (Brandon McManus kick), 12:15	TEM 7–0
UCLA — Nelson Rosario 46-yard pass from Kevin Prince (Kai Forbath kick), 6:00	TIE 7–7
2nd Quarter
TEM — Bernard Pierce 11-yard run (Brandon McManus kick), 3:47	TEM 14–7
TEM — Matt Brown 2-yard rush (Brandon McManus kick), 1:25	TEM 21–7
UCLA — Kai Forbath 40-yard field goal, 0:00	TEM 21–10
3rd Quarter
UCLA — Terrence Austin 32-yard pass from Kevin Prince (Kai Forbath kick), 11:59	TEM 21–17
4th Quarter
UCLA — Kai Forbath 42-yard field goal, 12:31	TEM 21–20
UCLA — Akeem Ayers 4-yard interception (Nelson Rosario pass from Kevin Prince two-point conversion), 6:01	UCLA 28–21
UCLA — Safety, 4:29	UCLA 30–21
