= Coaches Tour =

Coaches Tour is a program where college football coaches would visit the U.S. troops in the Middle East to provide entertainment relief. CoachesTour 2008 was the first year of the program, sponsored by Morale Entertainment, LLC. in association with Armed Forces Entertainment.

== Coaches ==
2009 — May 27 – June 4, Germany, Turkey, Iraq, Kuwait, Djibouti and Spain

- Tommy Tuberville (Coach Emeritus)
- Mack Brown (Texas), 2008 Coach of the Year
- Jim Tressel (Ohio State)
- Troy Calhoun (Air Force)
- Jim Grobe (Wake Forest)
- Rick Neuheisel (UCLA)
- Houston Nutt (Ole Miss)

2008 — May 20–26

- Mark Richt, University of Georgia
- Randy Shannon, University of Miami
- Jack Siedlecki, Yale University
- Tommy Tuberville, Auburn University
- Charlie Weis, University of Notre Dame
