= James Nixon (American football) =

American football player (born 1988)

No. 25
- Position: Cornerback

Personal information
- Born: February 2, 1988 (age 38); New Haven, Connecticut, U.S.
- Listed height: 6 ft 0 in (1.83 m)
- Listed weight: 186 lb (84 kg)

Career information
- High school: Hyde Leadership (CT)
- College: California (PA)
- NFL draft: 2012: undrafted

Career history
- Arizona Cardinals (2012)*; Green Bay Packers (2012–2013)
- * Offseason or practice squad member only

Career NFL statistics
- Games played: 3
- Games started: 0
- Stats at Pro Football Reference

James A. Nixon (born February 2, 1988) is an American former professional football player who was a cornerback in the National Football League (NFL). He played college football for the California Vulcans. Nixon was signed by the Arizona Cardinals as an undrafted free agent in 2012. He has also played for the Green Bay Packers.

== Professional career ==
Pre-draft measurables
Height	Weight	40-yard dash	10-yard split	20-yard split	20-yard shuttle	Three-cone drill	Vertical jump	Broad jump	Bench press
5 ft 11 3/4 in (1.82 m)	178 lb (81 kg)	4.27 s	1.41 s	2.46 s	3.87 s	6.54 s	37.0 in (0.94 m)	10 ft 3 in (3.12 m)	14 reps
All values from Pro Day

=== Arizona Cardinals ===
After going undrafted in the 2012 NFL draft, Nixon signed with the Arizona Cardinals on April 30, 2012. On August 24, 2012, he was released by the Cardinals.

=== Green Bay Packers ===
On September 20, 2012, Nixon was signed to the Green Bay Packers' practice squad, where he spent the rest of his rookie season. He was re-signed by the Packers after the season ended on January 14, 2013. Nixon was released on August 31, 2013, however he was signed to the Packers' practice squad two days later. On October 7, 2013, he was signed from the practice squad to the active roster. Nixon was placed on injured reserve on November 23, 2013, after suffering a knee injury. He was taken off injured reserve on February 2, 2014. Nixon was released by the Packers on May 14, 2014.

== Career statistics ==
=== NFL ===
Source: NFL.com

Year	Team	G	GS	Tackles					Interceptions						Fumbles	
Year	Team	G	GS	Total	Solo	Ast	Sck	SFTY	PDef	Int	Yds	Avg	Lng	TDs	FF	FR
Regular season
2013	GB	3	0	0	0	0	0.0	0	0	0	0	0.0	0	0	0	0
Total		3	0	0	0	0	0.0	0	0	0	0	0.0	0	0	0	0
