= Matt Balasavage =

American football player (born 1989)

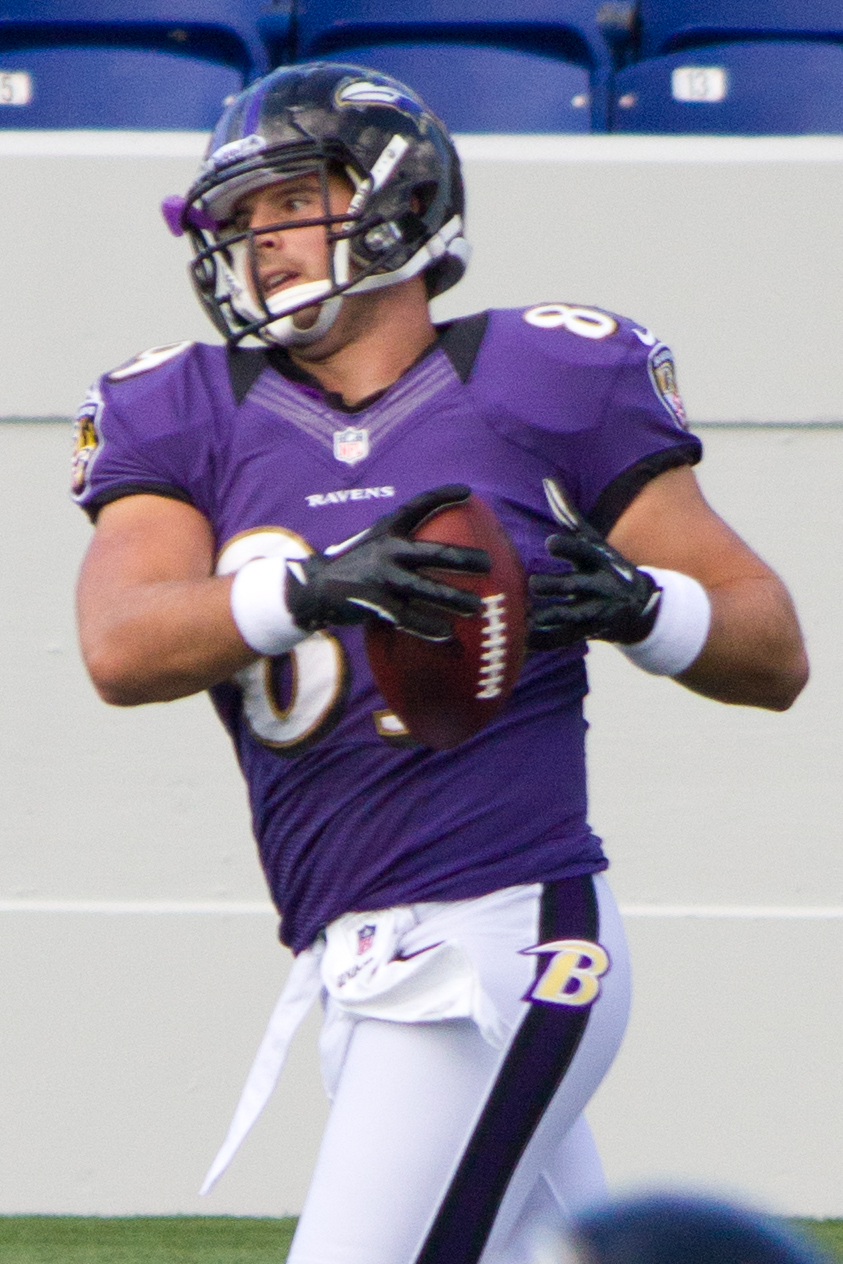
- Balasavage during Ravens practice at Navy–Marine Corps Memorial Stadium, August 2012

No. 89
- Position: Tight end

Personal information
- Born: February 15, 1989 (age 37); Lancaster, Pennsylvania, U.S.
- Listed height: 6 ft 4 in (1.93 m)
- Listed weight: 250 lb (113 kg)

Career information
- College: Temple
- NFL draft: 2012: undrafted

Career history
- Baltimore Ravens (2012)*
- * Offseason or practice squad member only

Matt Balasavage (born February 15, 1989) is an American former football tight end. He played until his senior year at Temple, declared for the 2012 NFL draft and was undrafted.

== College career ==
He played college football at Temple University.

== Professional career ==
Pre-draft measurables
Height	Weight	40-yard dash	10-yard split	20-yard split	20-yard shuttle	Three-cone drill	Vertical jump	Broad jump	Bench press
6 ft 3 3/4 in (1.92 m)	250 lb (113 kg)	5.00 s	1.73 s	2.87 s	4.50 s	7.75 s	29.5 in (0.75 m)	9 ft 2 in (2.79 m)	21 reps
All values from Pro Day

After going undrafted, he signed with the Baltimore Ravens. On August 31, 2012, he was placed on Injured Reserve due to an ankle injury. On September 4, 2012, he was released with an injury settlement.
