= List of East Tennessee State Buccaneers head football coaches =

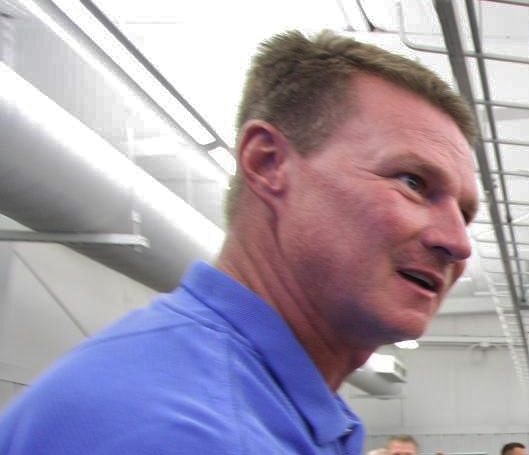
Randy Sanders served as the 18th head coach of the East Tennessee State Buccaneers from 2018–2021.

The East Tennessee State Buccaneers college football team represents the East Tennessee State University as a member of the Southern Conference (SoCon). The Buccaneers competes as part of the NCAA Division I Football Bowl Subdivision. The program has had 21 head coaches since it began play during the 1920 season. Since December 2024, Will Healy has served as head coach at East Tennessee State.

Since 1920, three coaches have led the Buccaneers in postseason bowl games: Star Wood, Hal Littleford, and John Robert Bell. Mike Cavan and Sanders have led East Tennessee State to appearances in the NCAA Division I Football Championship Subdivision playoffs. Three of coaches have also won conference championships: Gene McMurray captured one as a member of the Smoky Mountain Conference; Bell captured one as a member of the Ohio Valley Conference; and Sanders two as a member of the Southern Conference.

Wood is the leader in seasons coached and games won, with 65 victories during his 13 years with the program. Sanders has the highest winning percentage of those who have coached more than one game, with .619. Jack S. Batey has the lowest winning percentage of those who have coached more than one game, with .143.

== Key ==
Key to symbols in coaches list
General		Overall		Conference		Postseason (Note: Although the first Rose Bowl Game was played in 1902, it has been continuously played since the 1916 game, and is recognized as the oldest bowl game by the NCAA. "—" indicates any season prior to 1916 when postseason games were not played.)	
No.	Order of coaches (Note: A running total of the number of head coaches, with coaches who served separate tenures being counted only once. Interim head coaches are represented with "Int" and are not counted in the running total. "—" indicates the team played but either without a coach or no coach is on record. "X" indicates an interim year without play.)	GC	Games coached	CW	Conference wins	PW	Postseason wins
DC	Division championships	OW	Overall wins	CL	Conference losses	PL	Postseason losses
CC	Conference championships	OL	Overall losses	CT	Conference ties	PT	Postseason ties
NC	National championships	OT	Overall ties (Note: Overtime rules in college football were introduced in 1996, making ties impossible in the period since.)	C%	Conference winning percentage		
†	Elected to the College Football Hall of Fame	O%	Overall winning percentage (Note: When computing the win–loss percentage, a tie counts as half a win and half a loss.)				

== Coaches ==
List of head football coaches showing season(s) coached, overall records, conference records, postseason records, championships and selected awards (Note: Statistics correct as of the end of the 2025 NCAA Division I FCS football season.)
No.	Name	Season(s) (Note: East Tennessee State did not field teams from 1943–1945 due to World War II and from the 2004–2014 seasons when the program was disbanded.)	GC	OW	OL	OT	O%	CW	CL	CT	C%	PW	PL	PT	CC	NC	Awards
1	William R. Windes	1920–1921	12	7	5	0	0.583	—	—	—	—	—	—	—	—	0	—
2	James Karl Luck	1922–1924	26	12	13	1	0.481	—	—	—	—	—	—	—	—	0	—
3	John Robinson	1925–1929	38	13	23	2	0.368	—	—	—	—	—	—	—	—	0	—
4	Jack S. Batey	1930–1931	14	1	11	2	0.143	0	5	2	0.143	—	—	—	0	0	—
5	Gene McMurray	1932–1941; 1946	87	50	32	5	0.603	29	23	2	0.556	—	—	—	1	0	—
6	Loyd Roberts	1947–1951	45	23	20	2	0.533	5	4	1	0.550	—	—	—	0	0	—
7	Star Wood	1952–1953; 1955–1965	123	65	52	6	0.553	23	26	0	0.469	3	1	0	0	0	—
8	Hal Littleford	1953	10	5	4	1	0.550	0	0	0	–	1	0	0	0	0	—
9	John Robert Bell	1966–1972	70	31	34	5	0.479	21	24	4	0.469	1	0	0	1	0	—
10	Roy Frazier	1973–1977	54	16	36	2	0.386	11	20	0	0.355	0	0	0	0	0	—
11	Jack Carlisle	1978–1982	55	21	34	0	0.382	11	20	0	0.355	0	0	0	0	0	—
12	Buddy Sasser	1983–1984	22	9	13	0	0.409	3	10	0	0.231	0	0	0	0	0	—
13	Mike Ayers	1985–1987	33	11	21	1	0.348	6	15	0	0.286	0	0	0	0	0	—
14	Don Riley	1988–1991	44	9	35	0	0.205	6	22	0	0.214	0	0	0	0	0	—
15	Mike Cavan	1992–1996	57	30	27	0	0.526	20	19	0	0.513	1	1	0	0	0	—
16	Paul Hamilton	1997–2003	79	38	41	—	0.481	24	32	—	0.429	0	0	—	0	0	—
17	Carl Torbush	2015–2017	33	11	22	—	0.333	4	12	—	0.250	0	0	—	0	0	—
18	Randy Sanders	2018–2021	42	26	16	—	0.619	14	11	—	0.560	1	2	—	2	0	—
19	George Quarles	2022–2023	22	6	16	—	0.273	3	13	—	0.188	0	0	—	0	0	—
20	Tre Lamb	2024	12	7	5	—	0.583	5	3	—	0.625	0	0	—	0	0	—
21	Will Healy	2025–present	12	7	5	—	0.583	5	3	—	0.625	0	0	—	0	0	—
