= Sasser =

Sasser may refer to:

- Sasser (grape), a Romanian/Moldovan wine grape variety that is also known as Băbească neagră
- Sasser Pass (also Saser Pass, Saser-la), on the old caravan route between Ladakh and Yarkand
- Sasser (computer worm)
- Sasser, Georgia
- Sasser Cup

== People with the surname ==
- Bud Sasser, professional American football player
- Buddy Sasser, former American football coach and Big South Conference commissioner
- Clarence Sasser, a Vietnam veteran who received the Medal of Honor in 1969
- Grant Sasser, former NHL player
- Howell Sasser, Episcopalian priest
- Jason Sasser, former professional basketball player
- Jeryl Sasser, former professional basketball player in Kuwait
- Jim Sasser, a Democrat who represented Tennessee in the senate from 1977 to 1995
- Mackey Sasser, a former MLB player who was active from 1987 to 1995
- Marcus Sasser, basketball player for the Detroit Pistons
- Mattie Sasser, a Marshallese weightlifter who represented Marshall Islands at the 2016 Summer Olympics
- Rob Sasser, former MLB player
- Sean Sasser, a pastry chef and television personality best known for The Real World: San Francisco
- Wayne Sasser, Republican member of the North Carolina House of Representatives elected in 2018

== See also ==
- Saser (disambiguation)
