= 2012 Southern Conference football season =

- League: NCAA Division I FCS (Football Championship Subdivision)
- Sport: Football
- Duration: August 2012 - December 2012
- Teams: 9
- TV partner: SoConTV
- Conference champions: Georgia Southern, Appalachian State, & Wofford

Southern Conference football seasons
- ← 2011 2013 →

2012 Southern Conference football standings
	Conf.			Overall
Team	W		L	W		L
No. 6 Georgia Southern +^	6	–	2	10	–	4
No. 9 Wofford +^	6	–	2	9	–	4
No. 7 Appalachian State +^	6	–	2	8	–	4
The Citadel	5	–	3	7	–	4
Samford	5	–	3	7	–	4
Chattanooga	5	–	3	6	–	5
Furman	2	–	6	3	–	8
Elon	1	–	7	3	–	8
Western Carolina	0	–	8	1	–	10
+ – Conference co-champions; ^ – FCS playoff participant; Rankings from The Sports Network poll

The 2012 Southern Conference football season, part of the 2012 NCAA Division I FCS football season competition of college football, began on Thursday, August 30, 2012 with Western Carolina hosting Mars Hill. The regular season concluded on November 17, while Georgia Southern, Appalachian State, and Wofford qualified for the NCAA Division I Football Championship.

Appalachian State was eliminated in the first round at the hands of Illinois State. Wofford was subsequently eliminated the following week, losing to North Dakota State 14–7, and Georgia Southern, after defeating Central Arkansas and Old Dominion in the previous two weeks, fell to the Bison as well on December 14 in the tournament semifinals, 23–20.

== Preseason Poll Results ==
First place votes in parentheses

Place	Media	Coaches
1	Georgia Southern (25)	Georgia Southern (7)
2	Wofford (4)	Appalachian State (2)
3	Appalachian State (1)	Wofford
4	Chattanooga	Chattanooga
5	Furman	Furman
6	Samford	Samford
7	Elon	Elon
8	The Citadel	The Citadel
9	Western Carolina	Western Carolina

=== Preseason All-Conference Teams ===
Offensive Player of the Year: Eric Breitenstein, Sr., RB
Defensive Player of the Year: Brent Russell, Sr., DL

Position	Player	Class	Team
First Team Offense
QB	Jamal Jackson	Junior	Appalachian State
RB	Jerodis Williams	Senior	Furman
RB	Eric Breitenstein	Sr.	Wofford
WR	Aaron Mellette	Sr.	Elon
WR	Kelsey Pope	Jr.	Samford
TE	Colin Anderson	Sr.	Furman
OL	Mike Sellers	Jr.	The Citadel
OL	Dakota Dozier	Jr.	Furman
OL	Dorian Byrd	Jr.	Georgia Southern
OL	Ryan Dudchock	Sr.	Samford
OL	Jake Miles	Sr.	Wofford
First Team Defense
DL	Chris Billingslea	Sr.	The Citadel
DL	Josh Lynn	Sr.	Furman
DL	Brent Russell	Sr.	Georgia Southern
DL	Josh Williams	Sr.	Chattanooga
LB	Jeremy Kimbrough	Sr.	Appalachian State
LB	Wes Dothard	Jr.	Chattanooga
LB	Alvin Scioneaux	Jr.	Wofford
DB	Demetrius McCray	Sr.	Appalachian State
DB	Greg Worthy	Jr.	Furman
DB	Deion Stanley	So.	Georgia Southern
DB	D. J. Key	Jr.	Chattanooga
First Team Special Teams
K	Cameron Yaw	Sr.	Samford
P	Cass Couey	Sr.	The Citadel
RS	Fabian Truss	Jr.	Samford

== Rankings ==
Legend
Increase in ranking
Decrease in ranking
Not ranked previous week

		Pre	Wk 1	Wk 2	Wk 3	Wk 4	Wk 5	Wk 6	Wk 7	Wk 8	Wk 9	Wk 10	Wk 11	Wk 12	Final
Appalachian State	TSN	6	11	8	17	17	15	13	13	16	15	12	8	7	9
Appalachian State	C	5	8	7	18	16	14	12	11	15	14	12	8	6	8
Chattanooga	TSN	RV	RV	RV	RV	–									
Chattanooga	C	RV	–	–	–	–									
The Citadel	TSN	RV	RV	21	10	11	19								
The Citadel	C	-	–	23	14	15	22				RV				
Elon	TSN	RV	–	–	–	–									
Elon	C	-	-	-	–	–									
Furman	TSN	RV	RV	–	–	–									
Furman	C	-	-	–	–	–									
Georgia Southern	TSN	3	3	11	11	10	8	7	3	2	2	7	6	6	3
Georgia Southern	C	3	3	10	10	9	8	7	3	2	1	7	6	7	3
Samford	TSN	RV	RV	–	RV	RV									
Samford	C	-	-	RV	RV	25					RV				
Western Carolina	TSN	-	-	-	–	–									
Western Carolina	C	-	-	-	–	–									
Wofford	TSN	10	10	9	7	6	6	5	8	7	6	13	9	9	7
Wofford	C	13	13	9	6	5	5	4	9	8	7	14	9	9	7

== Regular season ==
Index to colors and formatting
SoCon member won
SoCon member lost
SoCon teams in **bold**

All times Eastern time.

Rankings reflect that of the Sports Network poll for that week.

=== Week One ===
Date	Time	Visiting team	Home team	Site	Broadcast	Result	Attendance	Reference
August 30	8:00 p.m.	Mars Hill	**Western Carolina**	E. J. Whitmire Stadium • Cullowhee, NC		**W** 42–14	7,094	
September 1	12:00 p.m.	**#6 Appalachian State**	East Carolina	Dowdy–Ficklen Stadium • Greenville, NC	FSN	**L** 13–35	49,023	
September 1	12:30 p.m.	**Elon**	North Carolina	Kenan Memorial Stadium • Chapel Hill, NC	ACC Network	**L** 0–62	50,500	
September 1	4:30 p.m.	**Furman**	**Samford**	Seibert Stadium • Homewood, AL	CSS	**SU** 24–21	6,712	
September 1	6:00 p.m.	Charleston Southern	**The Citadel**	Johnson Hagood Stadium • Charleston, SC		**W** 49–14	14,264	
September 1	6:00 p.m.	Jacksonville	**#3 Georgia Southern**	Paulson Stadium • Statesboro, GA		**W**58–0	20,132	
September 1	6:00 p.m.	**Wofford**	Gardner–Webb	Ernest W. Spangler Stadium • Boiling Springs, NC		**W** 34–7	3,140	
September 1	7:00 p.m.	**Chattanooga**	South Florida	Raymond James Stadium • Tampa, FL	ESPN3	**L** 13–34	41,285	

Players of the week:

Offensive		Defensive		Freshman		Special teams	
Player	Team	Player	Team	Player	Team	Player	Team
Eric Breitenstein	Wofford	Chris Billingslea	The Citadel	Sam Martin	Appalachian State	Troy Mitchell	Western Carolina

=== Week Two ===
Date	Time	Visiting team	Home team	Site	Broadcast	Result	Attendance	Reference
September 8	5:00 p.m.	Coastal Carolina	**Furman**	Paladin Stadium • Greenville, SC		**L** 45–47 (3OT)	7,156	
September 8	6:00 p.m.	**#3 Georgia Southern**	**The Citadel**	Johnson Hagood Stadium • Charleston, SC		**Cit** 23–21	12,299	
September 8	6:30 p.m.	#12 Montana	**#11 Appalachian State**	Kidd Brewer Stadium • Boone, NC	ESPN3	**W** 35–27	30,856	
September 8	7:00 p.m.	North Carolina Central	**Elon**	Rhodes Stadium • Elon, NC		**W** 34–14	7,528	
September 8	7:00 p.m.	West Alabama	**Samford**	Seibert Stadium • Homewood, AL		**W** 34–6	7,384	
September 8	7:00 p.m.	**Chattanooga**	Jacksonville State	JSU Stadium • Jacksonville, AL		**L** 24–27	18,993	
September 8	7:00 p.m.	**Western Carolina**	Marshall	Joan C. Edwards Stadium • Huntington, WV	FCS	**L** 24–52	25,317	
September 8	7:00 p.m.	Lincoln	**#10 Wofford**	Gibbs Stadium • Spartanburg, SC		**W** 82–0	4,309	

Players of the week:

Offensive		Defensive		Freshman		Special teams	
Player	Team	Player	Team	Player	Team	Player	Team
Jamal Jackson	Appalachian State	Jaquiski Tartt	Samford	Thomas Warren	The Citadel	Reese Hannon	Furman

=== Week Three ===
Date	Time	Visiting team	Home team	Site	Broadcast	Result	Attendance	Reference
September 13	7:00 p.m.	Glenville State	**Chattanooga**	Finley Stadium • Chattanooga, TN		**W** 35–0	9,077	
September 15	3:00 p.m.	West Virginia State	**Elon**	Rhodes Stadium • Elon, NC		**W**48–14	7,053	
September 15	3:00 p.m.	**Furman**	#11 (FBS) Clemson	Memorial Stadium • Clemson, SC	ESPN3	**L** 7–41	81,500	
September 15	3:00 p.m.	**Samford**	Gardner–Webb	Ernest W. Spangler Stadium • Boiling Springs, NC		**W** 44–23	3,850	
September 15	3:30 p.m.	**#21 The Citadel**	**#8 Appalachian State**	Kidd Brewer Stadium • Boone, NC		**Cit** 52–28	24,137	
September 15	7:00 p.m.	**Western Carolina**	**#9 Wofford**	Gibbs Stadium • Spartanburg, SC		**WC** 49–20	8,544	

Players of the week:

Offensive		Defensive		Freshman		Special teams	
Player	Team	Player	Team	Player	Team	Player	Team
Ben Dupree	The Citadel	Carson Smith	The Citadel	Michael Wiemer	Wofford	Fabian Truss	Samford

=== Week Four ===
Date	Time	Visiting team	Home team	Site	Broadcast	Result	Attendance	Reference
September 22	12:00 p.m.	**Furman**	Presbyterian	Bailey Memorial Stadium • Clinton, SC	CSS	**W** 31–21	5,370	
September 22	3:30 p.m.	**Samford**	**Western Carolina**	E. J. Whitmire Stadium • Cullowhee, NC		**SU** 25–21	10,112	
September 22	6:00 p.m.	**#17 Appalachian State**	**Chattanooga**	Finley Stadium • Chattanooga, TN		**ASU** 34–17	13,726	
September 22	6:00 p.m.	**#10 The Citadel**	NC State	Carter–Finley Stadium • Raleigh, NC	ESPN3	**L** 14–52	55,145	
September 22	6:00 p.m.	**Elon**	**#11 Georgia Southern**	Paulson Stadium • Statesboro, GA		**GSU** 26–23	18,353	

Players of the week:

Offensive		Defensive		Freshman		Special teams	
Player	Team	Player	Team	Player	Team	Player	Team
Fabian Truss	Samford	Brandon Greir	Appalachian State	James Bradberry	Samford	Alex Hanes	Georgia Southern

=== Week Five ===
Date	Time	Visiting team	Home team	Site	Broadcast	Result	Attendance	Reference
September 29	1:30 p.m.	**#6 Wofford**	**Elon**	Rhodes Stadium • Elon, NC		**WC** 49–24	10,302	
September 29	1:30 p.m.	**Western Carolina**	**Furman**	Paladin Stadium • Greenville, SC		**FUR** 45–24	10,218	
September 29	3:30 p.m.	Coastal Carolina	**#17 Appalachian State**	Kidd Brewer Stadium • Boone, NC		**W** 55–14	27,619	
September 29	6:00 p.m.	**Chattanooga**	**#11 The Citadel**	Johnson Hagood Stadium • Charleston, SC		**UTC** 28–10	13,878	
September 29	6:00 p.m.	**Samford**	**#10 Georgia Southern**	Paulson Stadium • Statesboro, GA	ESPN3	**GSU** 35–16	20,832	

Players of the week:

Offensive		Defensive		Freshman		Special teams	
Player	Team	Player	Team	Player	Team	Player	Team
Eric Breitenstein	Wofford	Kadeem Wise	Chattanooga	Sean Price	Appalachian State	Jerodis Williams	Furman

=== Week Six ===
Date	Time	Visiting team	Home team	Site	Broadcast	Result	Attendance	Reference
October 6	1:30 p.m.	**Furman**	**Wofford**	Gibbs Stadium • Spartanburg, SC		**WC** 20–17	9,170	
October 6	3:00 p.m.	**The Citadel**	**Samford**	Seibert Stadium • Homewood, AL		**SU** 38–7	5,872	
October 6	3:30 p.m.	**Elon**	**Appalachian State**	Kidd Brewer Stadium • Boone, NC		**ASU** 35–23	29,073	
October 6	3:30 p.m.	**Georgia Southern**	**Western Carolina**	E. J Whitmire Stadium • Cullowhee, NC		**GSU** 45–13	9,514	

Players of the week:

Offensive		Defensive		Freshman		Special teams	
Player	Team	Player	Team	Player	Team	Player	Team
Jamal Jackson	Appalachian State	Jaquiski Tartt	Samford	James Dean	Georgia Southern	Ray Early	Furman

=== Week Seven ===
Date	Time	Visiting team	Home team	Site	Broadcast	Result	Attendance	Reference
October 13	1:30 p.m.	**Chattanooga**	**Furman**	Paladin Stadium • Greenville, NC	ESPN3	**WC** 20–17	9,170	
October 13	2:00 p.m.	**Western Carolina**	**The Citadel**	Johnson Hagood Stadium • Charleston, SC		**Cit** 45–31	12,578	
October 13	3:00 p.m.	**Appalachian State**	**Samford**	Seibert Stadium • Homewood, AL		**ASU** 35–23	9,712	
October 13	6:00 p.m.	**Wofford**	**Georgia Southern**	Paulson Stadium • Statesboro, GA		**GSU** 17–9	20,983	

Players of the week:

Offensive		Defensive		Freshman		Special teams	
Player	Team	Player	Team	Player	Team	Player	Team
Dominique Swope	Georgia Southern	Rock Williams	Western Carolina	Jacob Huesman	Chattanooga	Sam Martin	Appalachian State

=== Week Eight ===
Date	Time	Visiting team	Home team	Site	Broadcast	Result	Attendance	Reference
October 20	1:30 p.m.	**Georgia Southern**	**Furman**	Paladin Stadium • Greenville, NC		**GSU** 38–17	11,191	
October 20	3:00 p.m.	**Western Carolina**	**Elon**	Rhodes Stadium • Elon, NC	ESPN3	**Elon** 42–31	10,154	
October 20	3:30 p.m.	**Wofford**	**Appalachian State**	Kidd Brewer Stadium • Boone, NC		**WC** 20–17	27,115	
October 20	6:00 p.m.	**Samford**	**Chattanooga**	Finley Stadium • Chattanooga, TN		**UTC** 20–13	7,103	

Players of the week:

Offensive		Defensive		Freshman		Special teams	
Player	Team	Player	Team	Player	Team	Player	Team
Thomas Wilson	Elon	Tarek Odom	Wofford	Troy Mitchell	Western Carolina	Tony Washington	Appalachian State

=== Week Nine ===
Date	Time	Visiting team	Home team	Site	Broadcast	Result	Attendance	Reference
October 27	1:30 p.m.	**The Citadel**	**Wofford**	Gibbs Stadium • Spartanburg, SC	ESPN3	**WC** 24–21	9,658	
October 27	3:00 p.m.	**Furman**	**Elon**	Rhodes Stadium • Elon, NC		**FUR** 31–17	6,158	
October 27	3:30 p.m.	**Appalachian State**	**Western Carolina**	E. J. Whitmire Stadium • Cullowhee, NC		**ASU** 38–27	13,279	
October 27	6:00 p.m.	**Georgia Southern**	**Chattanooga**	Finley Stadium • Chattanooga, TN		**GSU** 39–31	8,908	

Players of the week:

Offensive		Defensive		Freshman		Special teams	
Steven Miller	Appalachian State	Marcus McMorris	Furman	Jacob Huesman	Chattanooga	Kasey Redfern	Wofford

=== Week Ten ===
Date	Time	Visiting team	Home team	Site	Broadcast	Result	Attendance	Reference
November 3	2:00 p.m.	**Appalachian State**	**Georgia Southern**	Paulson Stadium • Statesboro, GA	ESPN3	**ASU** 31–28	22,155	
November 3	2:00 p.m.	**Elon**	**The Citadel**	Johnson Hagood Stadium • Charleston, SC		**Cit** 38–24	14,853	
November 3	3:00 p.m.	**Wofford**	**Samford**	Seibert Stadium • Homewood, AL		**SU** 24–17 (OT)	8,147	
November 3	3:30 p.m.	**Chattanooga**	**Western Carolina**	E. J. Whitmire Stadium • Cullowhee, NC		**UTC** 45–24	7,099	

Players of the week:

Offensive		Defensive		Freshman		Special teams	
Player	Team	Player	Team	Player	Team	Player	Team
Sean Price	Appalachian State	Troy Sanders	Appalachian State	Sean Price	Appalachian State	Cameron Yaw	Samford

=== Week Eleven ===
Date	Time	Visiting team	Home team	Site	Broadcast	Result	Attendance	Reference
November 10	1:30 p.m.	**The Citadel**	VMI	Alumni Memorial Field • Lexington, VA		**W** 27–24	7,863	
November 10	1:30 p.m.	**Samford**	**Elon**	Rhodes Stadium • Elon, NC		**SU** 26–15	6,231	
November 10	1:30 p.m.	**Chattanooga**	**Wofford**	Gibbs Stadium • Spartanburg, SC	ESPN3	**WC** 16–13	8,112	
November 10	2:00 p.m.	Howard	**Georgia Southern**	Paulson Stadium • Statesboro, GA		**W** 69–26	18,069	
November 10	3:30 p.m.	**Furman**	**Appalachian State**	Kidd Brewer Stadium • Boone, NC		**ASU** 33–28	28,946	

Players of the week:

Offensive		Defensive		Freshman		Special teams	
Player	Team	Player	Team	Player	Team	Player	Team
Jerick McKinnon	Georgia Southern	Derek Douglas	Citadel	Jacob Huesman	Chattanooga	Sam Martin	Appalachian State

=== Week Twelve ===
Date	Time	Visiting team	Home team	Site	Broadcast	Result	Attendance	Reference
November 17	1:30 p.m.	The Citadel	**Furman**	Paladin Stadium • Greenville, SC	ESPN3	**Cit** 42–20	8,127	
November 17	2:00 p.m.	Elon	**Chattanooga**	Finley Stadium • Chattanooga, TN		**UTC** 24–17	8,791	
November 17	1:30 p.m.	Georgia Southern	Georgia	Sanford Stadium • Athens, GA	ESPN3	**L** 45–14	92,746	
November 17	7:30 p.m.	Samford	Kentucky	Commonwealth Stadium • Lexington, KY	ESPN3	**L** 34–3	46,749	
November 17	12:21 p.m.	Western Carolina	Alabama	Bryant–Denny Stadium • Tuscaloosa, AL	ESPN3, SEC TV	**L** 49–0	101,126	
November 17	1:00 p.m.	Wofford	South Carolina	Williams-Brice Stadium • Columbia, SC	ESPN3	**L** 24–7	79,982	

Players of the week:

Offensive		Defensive		Freshman		Special teams	
Player	Team	Player	Team	Player	Team	Player	Team

== Attendance ==
Team	Stadium	Capacity	Game 1	Game 2	Game 3	Game 4	Game 5	Game 6	Game 7	Game 8	Total	Average	% of Capacity
Appalachian State	Kidd Brewer Stadium	30,856	24,137	27,619	29,073	27,115	28,946	—	—	—	185,404	26,358	128.22%
Chattanooga	Finley Stadium	20,668	9,077	13,726	7,103	—	—	—	—	—	29,906	9,969	48.23%
The Citadel	Johnson Hagood Stadium	21,000	14,264	12,299	13,878	12,578	—	—	—	—	53,019	13,255	63.12%
Elon	Rhodes Stadium	13,000	7,528	7,053	10,302	10,154	—	—	—	—	35,037	8,759	67.38%
Furman	Paladin Stadium	16,000	7,156	10,218	8,351	11,191	—	—	—	—	36,916	9,229	57.68%
Georgia Southern	Paulson Stadium	18,000	20,132	18,353	20,832	20,983	—	—	—	—	80,300	20,075	111.53%
Samford	Seibert Stadium	6,700	6,712	7,384	5,872	9,712	—	—	—	—	29,680	7,420	110.75%
Western Carolina	E.J. Whitmire Stadium	13,742	7,094	10,112	9,514	—	—	—	—	—	26,721	8,907	64.82%
Wofford	Gibbs Stadium	13,000	4,309	8,544	9,170	—	—	—	—	—	22,023	7,341	56.47%

== NFL draft ==
The following list includes all SoCon players who were drafted in the 2013 NFL draft.

Round #	Pick #	NFL team	Player	Position	College
3	80	Dallas Cowboys	J. J. Wilcox	S	Georgia Southern
5	165	Detroit Lions	Sam Martin	P	Appalachian State
7	210	Jacksonville Jaguars	Demetrius McCray	CB	Appalachian State
7	223	Pittsburgh Steelers	Nick Williams	DT	Samford
7	238	Baltimore Ravens	Aaron Mellette	WR	Elon
