= 2012 The Citadel Bulldogs football team =

American college football season

2012 The Citadel Bulldogs football
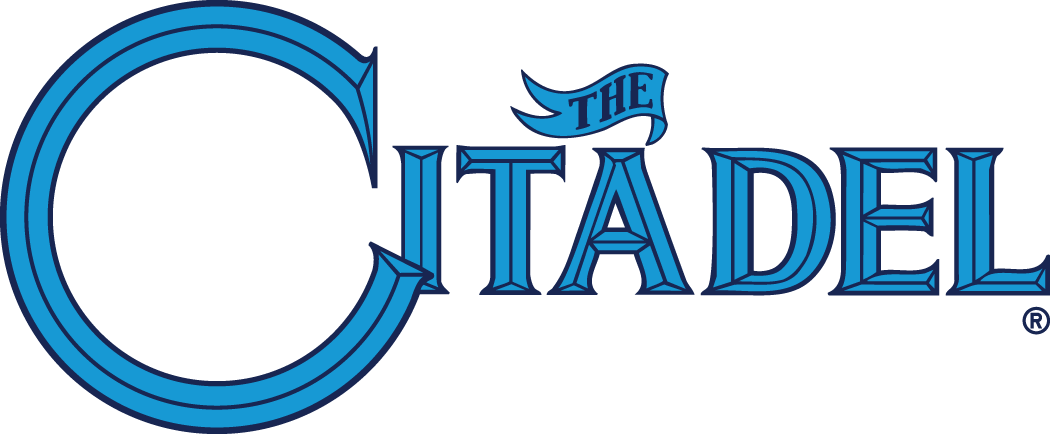
- Conference: Southern Conference
- Record: 7–4 (4–3 SoCon)
- Head coach: Kevin Higgins (8th season)
- Offensive coordinator: Bob Bodine (2nd season)
- Offensive scheme: Triple option
- Defensive coordinator: Denny Doornbos (1st season)
- Base defense: 4–2–5
- Home stadium: Johnson Hagood Stadium

2012 Southern Conference football standings
| | Conf. | | | Overall |
| Team | W | | L | W | | L |
|---|---|---|---|---|---|---|
| No. 6 Georgia Southern +^ | 6 | – | 2 | 10 | – | 4 |
| No. 9 Wofford +^ | 6 | – | 2 | 9 | – | 4 |
| No. 7 Appalachian State +^ | 6 | – | 2 | 8 | – | 4 |
| The Citadel | 5 | – | 3 | 7 | – | 4 |
| Samford | 5 | – | 3 | 7 | – | 4 |
| Chattanooga | 5 | – | 3 | 6 | – | 5 |
| Furman | 2 | – | 6 | 3 | – | 8 |
| Elon | 1 | – | 7 | 3 | – | 8 |
| Western Carolina | 0 | – | 8 | 1 | – | 10 |
+ – Conference co-champions; ^ – FCS playoff participant; Rankings from The Sports Network poll

The 2012 The Citadel Bulldogs football team represented The Citadel, The Military College of South Carolina in the 2012 NCAA Division I FCS football season. The Bulldogs were led by eighth year head coach Kevin Higgins and played their home games at Johnson Hagood Stadium. They are a member of the Southern Conference. They finished the season 7–4, 4–3 in SoCon play to finish in a three-way tie for fourth place.

== Preseason ==
=== Recruiting ===
College recruiting information
| Name | Hometown | School | Height | Weight | Commit date |
|---|---|---|---|---|---|
| Harrison Davis; OG | Marietta, GA | Walton High School | 6 ft 3 in (1.91 m) | 250 lb (110 kg) | Oct 27, 2011 |
| Harrison Davis; OG | Recruit ratings: (45) | | | | |
| Preston Durham; OLB | Inman, SC | Chapman High School | 6 ft 0 in (1.83 m) | 201 lb (91 kg) | |
| Preston Durham; OLB | Recruit ratings: (NR) | | | | |
| Brent O'Neal; ATH | St. Petersburg, FL | Canterbury School | 5 ft 9 in (1.75 m) | 180 lb (82 kg) | Jan 22, 2012 |
| Brent O'Neal; ATH | Recruit ratings: ESPN: (74) | | | | |
Overall recruit ranking:
Note: In many cases, Scout, Rivals, 247Sports, On3, and ESPN may conflict in their listings of height and weight.; In these cases, the average was taken. ESPN grades are on a 100-point scale.; Sources: "ESPN – Citadel Football Recruiting 2012". ESPN.; "2012 Team Ranking". Rivals.com.

=== Polls ===
The Citadel was picked eighth in the nine team Southern Conference by both the media and coaches.

=== All-SoCon selections ===
Five Bulldogs were selected to the All-Conference teams by the coaches. C Mike Cellars, P Cass Couey, and DE Chris Billingslea were named to the first team while DT Derek Douglas and FB Darien Robinson were second team selections.

== Schedule ==
For the second year in a row, home games in September were scheduled for a 6:00 p.m. kickoff rather than the traditional 2:00 p.m. kickoff.

| Date | Time | Opponent | Rank | Site | TV | Result | Attendance |
|---|---|---|---|---|---|---|---|
| September 1 | 6:00 pm | Charleston Southern* | | Johnson Hagood Stadium; Charleston, SC | BI | W 49–14 | 14,264 |
| September 8 | 6:00 pm | No. 3 Georgia Southern | | Johnson Hagood Stadium; Charleston, SC | BI | W 23–21 | 12,299 |
| September 15 | 3:30 pm | at No. 8 Appalachian State | No. 21 | Kidd Brewer Stadium; Boone, NC | | W 52–28 | 24,137 |
| September 22 | 6:00 pm | at NC State* | No. 10 | Carter–Finley Stadium; Raleigh, NC | ESPN3 | L 14–52 | 55,145 |
| September 29 | 6:00 pm | Chattanooga | No. 11 | Johnson Hagood Stadium; Charleston, SC | BI | L 10–28 | 13,878 |
| October 6 | 3:00 pm | at Samford | No. 19 | Seibert Stadium; Homewood, AL | | L 7–38 | 5,872 |
| October 13 | 2:00 pm | Western Carolina | | Johnson Hagood Stadium; Charleston, SC | BI | W 45–31 | 12,578 |
| October 27 | 1:30 pm | at No. 7 Wofford | | Gibbs Stadium; Spartanburg, SC (rivalry) | ESPN3 | L 21–24 | 9,658 |
| November 3 | 2:00 pm | Elon^{†} | | Johnson Hagood Stadium; Charleston, SC | BI | W 38–24 | 14,853 |
| November 10 | 1:30 pm | at VMI* | | Alumni Memorial Field; Lexington, VA (Military Classic of the South) | | W 27–24 | 7,863 |
| November 17 | 1:30 pm | at Furman | | Paladin Stadium; Greenville, NC (rivalry) | ESPN3 | W 42–20 | 8,127 |
*Non-conference game; ^{†}Homecoming; Rankings from The Sports Network Poll released prior to the game; All times are in Eastern time

== Game summaries ==
=== Charleston Southern ===
| Team | 1 | 2 | 3 | 4 | Total |
|---|---|---|---|---|---|
| Buccaneers | 0 | 14 | 0 | 0 | 14 |
| • Bulldogs | 7 | 7 | 28 | 7 | 49 |

- Date: September 1
- Location: Johnson Hagood Stadium, Charleston, SC
- Game start: 6:00 PM EST
- Game attendance: 14,264
- Game weather: Sunny, 86°
- Referee: Thomas Graham

The Citadel's season opened at home against Charleston Southern. The Bulldogs and Buccaneers met for the sixth time, with The Citadel holding a 4–1 advantage in the all-time series. The Citadel won the last meeting 35–14 in the 2007 opener. Charleston Southern claimed its only victory over the Bulldogs in 2006, a double–overtime win that is also the only home-opener loss for The Citadel under coach Kevin Higgins. The cross-town rivals have squared off to open the season three previous times, with The Citadel winning all three games.

As a result of six fumbles, two lost, the teams were tied at halftime despite The Citadel dominating all phases of the game. After the half, the Bulldogs scored four touchdowns in the third quarter to put the game out of reach. QB Ben Dupree rushed 17 times for 77 yards and two touchdowns, Rickey Anderson had 10 carries for 80 yards and 3 touchdowns, and Darien Robinson had 12 rushes for 120 yards and a touchdown. The Bulldogs passed just six times, completing three of them. QB Aaron Miller was 3 for 5 passing, completing passes to three different receivers. The Citadel did not punt in the game, missing one field goal. Charleston Southern QB Malcolm Dixon completed 6 of 14 passes for 123 yards, a touchdown and an interception. Chase Jones had two catches for 77 yards and a touchdown.

=== Georgia Southern ===
| Team | 1 | 2 | 3 | 4 | Total |
|---|---|---|---|---|---|
| #3 Eagles | 7 | 7 | 0 | 7 | 21 |
| • Bulldogs | 14 | 3 | 3 | 3 | 23 |

- Date: September 8
- Location: Johnson Hagood Stadium, Charleston, SC
- Game start: 6:00 PM EST
- Game attendance: 12,299
- Game weather: Mostly Cloudy, 83°
- Referee: Duane Heydt

The Bulldogs hosted #3 Georgia Southern in the SoCon opener for both schools. The two teams return two of the top three rushing attacks in the country (and the conference as Wofford is the other) and run the same Triple Option scheme on offense. The Eagles entered with a commanding 174 record against The Citadel, including a pair of playoff victories over the Bulldogs in 1988 and 1990. Last year, Georgia Southern held off The Citadel 14–12 in Statesboro as the Bulldogs missed a field goal in a swirling wind with seconds remaining. The last Citadel victory in the series was a 24–21 win in Charleston in 2006. Georgia Southern had won five in a row, but four of those were by less than a touchdown. The Citadel had lost nine consecutive home conference games.

The Citadel forced two turnovers in the first quarter, converting both fumbles into touchdowns for a quick 14–0 lead. Georgia Southern scored three touchdowns, while The Citadel kicked a pair of field goals to trail 21–20 late. Thomas Warren kicked a 37-yard field goal for a 23–21 lead with 35 seconds remaining, nearly the identical situation to the 2011 meeting when Warren missed a 37-yard attempt with 13 seconds left which would have won. Georgia Southern returned the ensuing kickoff into Bulldog territory, but missed their own 31-yard field goal attempt as time ran out, sealing The Citadel's win. The Bulldogs entered the 2012 NCAA Division I FCS football rankings for the first time since 2008.

=== Appalachian State ===
| Team | 1 | 2 | 3 | 4 | Total |
|---|---|---|---|---|---|
| • #21 Bulldogs | 14 | 24 | 14 | 0 | 52 |
| #8 Mountaineers | 0 | 7 | 7 | 14 | 28 |

- Date: September 15
- Location: Kidd Brewer Stadium, Boone, NC
- Game start: 3:30 PM EST
- Game attendance: 24,137
- Game weather: Partly Cloudy, 70°
- Referee: Ted Pitts

The Citadel made its first road trip of the season to Boone, NC, where the Bulldogs had not won since their last SoCon championship season of 1992. The Mountaineers entered claiming eight victories in a row and 17 of 18 against The Citadel. This was the second game of a daunting three game stretch for The Citadel, playing the teams picked to finish first and second in the league followed by a trip to FBS NC State. Last season, Appalachian State raced to a 49–14 lead in the third quarter before The Citadel stormed back with four unanswered touchdowns led by QB Aaron Miller before running out of time, losing 49–14.

The Bulldogs raced to an early 24–0 lead, scoring touchdowns on their first three possessions before being limited to a field goal on their fourth while holding App State scoreless. The Mountaineers punted again on their fourth possession, but LB Carson Smith blocked the kick and returned it for a touchdown to extend The Citadel lead to 31–0. The Citadel added three more touchdowns before the end of the third quarter, while App State finally broke through against The Citadel's reserve defense late in the game, scoring a pair of touchdowns in the fourth quarter. The Citadel amassed 618 yards of offense, its most ever in a regulation game and just 23 yards short of the all-time record in an overtime game against Furman. The Bulldogs option offense gained 463 yards on the ground, with three backs each recording over 100 yards and WR Matt Thompson adding 123 yards receiving. App State's home win streak of 18 games was snapped, and The Citadel won in Boone for the first time since 1992.

=== NC State ===
| Team | 1 | 2 | 3 | 4 | Total |
|---|---|---|---|---|---|
| #10 Bulldogs | 7 | 0 | 7 | 0 | 14 |
| • Wolfpack | 21 | 21 | 0 | 10 | 52 |

- Date: September 22
- Location: Carter–Finley Stadium, Raleigh, NC
- Game start: 6:00 PM EST
- Game attendance: 55,145
- Game weather: Sunny, 82°
- Referee: Jerry Magallene
- TV announcers (ESPN3): Mike Gleason, Paul Maguire, Sarah Stankavage

The Bulldogs travel to Raleigh, NC for the fourth time, having once played NC State in Wilmington, NC. The Wolfpack has claimed victories in all four meetings between the schools, most recently a 1983 win by 45–0. The three previous meetings were all prior to World War II. The Citadel has not defeated an FBS opponent since 1992, when they stunned Arkansas and defeated Army. The Citadel has not defeated an Atlantic Coast Conference school since the conference was formed by seven Southern Conference schools in 1953. The Bulldogs have claimed seven wins over current ACC schools, with six of those wins coming against Clemson, most recently in 1931.

=== Chattanooga ===
| Team | 1 | 2 | 3 | 4 | Total |
|---|---|---|---|---|---|
| • Mocs | 0 | 14 | 7 | 7 | 28 |
| #11 Bulldogs | 3 | 0 | 7 | 0 | 10 |

- Date: September 29
- Location: Johnson Hagood Stadium, Charleston, SC
- Game start: 6:00 PM EST
- Game attendance: 13,878
- Game weather: Partly cloudy, humid, 82°
- Referee: Ed Rhodes

=== Samford ===
| Team | 1 | 2 | 3 | 4 | Total |
|---|---|---|---|---|---|
| #19 Bulldogs (Cit) | 0 | 0 | 7 | 0 | 7 |
| • Bulldogs (Sam) | 7 | 7 | 10 | 14 | 38 |

- Date: October 6
- Location: Seibert Stadium, Homewood, AL
- Game start: 3:00 PM EST
- Game attendance: 5,872
- Game weather: Overcast, 65°
- Referee: Thomas Graham

=== Western Carolina ===
| Team | 1 | 2 | 3 | 4 | Total |
|---|---|---|---|---|---|
| Catamounts | 0 | 17 | 7 | 7 | 31 |
| • Bulldogs | 7 | 10 | 7 | 21 | 45 |

- Date: October 15
- Location: Johnson Hagood Stadium, Charleston, SC
- Game start: 2:00 PM EST
- Game attendance: 12,578
- Game weather: Partly Cloudy, 75°
- Referee: Ted Pitts

=== Wofford ===
| Team | 1 | 2 | 3 | 4 | Total |
|---|---|---|---|---|---|
| Bulldogs | 7 | 7 | 0 | 7 | 21 |
| • #7 Terriers | 14 | 10 | 0 | 0 | 24 |

- Date: October 27
- Location: Gibbs Stadium, Spartanburg, SC
- Game start: 1:30 PM EST
- Game attendance: 9,658
- Game weather: Mostly cloudy, 72°
- Referee: Larry Saunders
- TV announcers (ESPN3): Darren Goldwater, Paul Maguire

=== Elon ===
| Team | 1 | 2 | 3 | 4 | Total |
|---|---|---|---|---|---|
| Phoenix | 3 | 3 | 11 | 7 | 24 |
| • Bulldogs | 14 | 10 | 7 | 7 | 38 |

- Date: November 3
- Location: Johnson Hagood Stadium, Charleston, SC
- Game start: 2:00 PM EST
- Game attendance: 14,853
- Game weather: Sunny, 65°
- Referee: Ed Rhodes

=== VMI ===
| Team | 1 | 2 | 3 | 4 | Total |
|---|---|---|---|---|---|
| • Bulldogs | 7 | 10 | 7 | 3 | 27 |
| Keydets | 3 | 0 | 7 | 14 | 24 |

- Date: November 10
- Location: Alumni Memorial Field, Lexington, VA
- Game start: 1:30 PM EST
- Game attendance: 7,863
- Game weather: Mostly sunny, 67°
- Referee: Jeff Flanagan

=== Furman ===
| Team | 1 | 2 | 3 | 4 | Total |
|---|---|---|---|---|---|
| • Bulldogs | 14 | 7 | 7 | 14 | 42 |
| Paladins | 14 | 3 | 3 | 0 | 20 |

- Date: November 17
- Location: Paladin Stadium, Greenville, SC
- Game start: 1:30 PM EST
- Game attendance: 8,127
- Game weather: Sunny, 57°
- Referee: Thomas Graham
- TV announcers (ESPN3): Darren Goldwater, Doug Chapman

== Coaches ==
The Bulldogs saw two coaches depart in the offseason, with Defensive Coordinator/safeties coach Josh Conklin departing for Tennessee and Tight Ends coach Raleigh Jackson accepting the linebackers coach position at Division II Slippery Rock. The Bulldogs added John Hauser from Wayne State to coach safeties. Defensive line coach Denny Doornbos added Defensive Coordinator responsibilities.

| Name | Position | Alma mater | Year |
|---|---|---|---|
| Kevin Higgins | Head coach | West Chester | 8th |
| Denny Doornbos | Assistant Head Coach/Defensive Coordinator/Defensive Line | Western Michigan | 3rd |
| Bob Bodine | Offensive Coordinator/Offensive Line | Tulane | 3rd |
| Aashon Larkins | Special Teams Coordinator/Linebackers | Lehigh | 7th |
| Craig Candeto | Quarterbacks/Defensive Backs | United States Naval Academy | 2nd |
| Bill Mottola | Slot Backs | Springfield College | 2nd |
| J.P. Gunter | Wide Receivers/Recruiting Coordinator | Lenoir–Rhyne | 3rd |
| Scott Yielding | Tight Ends | The Citadel | 1st |
| Gerald Dixon | Cornerbacks | Alabama | 5th |
| John Hauser | Safeties | Wittenberg | 1st |
| Chad Wheeler | Assistant Defensive Coach | Florida State | 2nd |
| Cody Worley | Offensive Quality Control | Furman | 2nd |
| Jesse Johnson | Defensive Quality Control | Michigan State | 1st |
| Mickey McDermott | Special Teams Quality Control | Charleston Southern | 2nd |
| Eli Crawford | Assistant Special Teams Quality Control | Valparaiso | 1st |
| Donnell Boucher | Strength & Conditioning | Worcester State | 6th |

== Roster ==
2012 The Citadel Bulldogs football team roster
Players
Coaches
Offense

| Pos. | # | Name | Class |
|---|---|---|---|
| QB | 2 | Ben Dupree | Jr |
| WR | 3 | Domonic Jones | Jr |
| QB | 4 | Parker Gaston | Sr |
| WR | 5 | Matt Thompson | Jr |
| WR | 6 | Greg Adams | Sr |
| RB | 8 | Dalton Trevino | So |
| WR | 11 | Douglas German | Sr |
| QB | 12 | Aaron Miller | So |
| WR | 14 | Drew McCluskey | Fr |
| RB | 16 | Vinny Miller | Fr |
| QB | 17 | Trey White | Fr |
| RB | 18 | Dylan Busby | Fr |
| QB | 19 | Julian Walker | Fr |
| RB | 20 | Te'Myrick Mosley | Fr |
| RB | 21 | Rickey Anderson | Sr |
| FB | 22 | Darien Robinson | Jr |
| FB | 23 | Terrell Dallas | Sr |
| FB | 24 | Shaunn Middleton | So |
| RB | 25 | Terrance Martin | Jr |
| RB | 26 | Jake Stenson | Jr |
| WR | 29 | John Cyre | So |
| RB | 32 | Van Dyke Jones | Sr |
| OL | 50 | Mike Sellers | Jr |
| OL | 51 | Brooks Bonnette | So |
| OL | 53 | Sam Frye | Fr |
| OL | 54 | Charles Coleman | So |
| OL | 55 | Keith Carter | Jr |
| OL | 56 | Michael Mabry | Fr |
| OL | 57 | Kyle Weaver | Fr |
| OL | 63 | Emmet Howle | Fr |
| OL | 65 | Jim Knowles | Jr |
| OL | 67 | Victor Hill | Jr |
| OL | 68 | Nick Rudman | So |
| OL | 71 | Jack Taylor | Fr |
| SR | 73 | Neal Strange | Sr |
| OL | 74 | Robert Finke | Jr |
| OL | 75 | Harrison Davis | Fr |
| OL | 76 | Devin Bice | Jr |
| OL | 78 | Elliott Thomas | So |
| TE | 81 | Alex Glover | So |
| WR | 82 | Brandon Eakins | Fr |
| WR | 83 | Trent Butler | Fr |
| TE | 84 | Cullen Brown | Jr |
| TE | 85 | Capers Williamson | So |
| WR | 87 | Paul Brown | Fr |

Defense

| Pos. | # | Name | Class |
|---|---|---|---|
| DB | 1 | Sadath Jean-Pierre | Jr |
| DB | 4 | Akeem Garnett | So |
| DB | 7 | Keith Gamble | Sr |
| LB | 9 | Carson Smith | So |
| DB | 10 | Adrian Ranson | Fr |
| DB | 13 | Cody Richardson | Fr |
| DB | 23 | Mike Adams | Jr |
| LB | 26 | Yemi Oyengunle | Sr |
| DB | 27 | Nick Willis | Fr |
| DB | 28 | Julian Baxter | So |
| LB | 29 | Carl Robinson | So |
| LB | 31 | Hunter Shepherd | Fr |
| LB | 33 | Doyen Harris | So |
| LB | 34 | Preston Durham | Fr |
| LB | 37 | Joe Crochet | Fr |
| DB | 38 | Martin Fosberry | Sr |
| DB | 39 | Dondray Copeland | Fr |
| LB | 40 | Rah Muhammad | So |
| DB | 41 | Walker Smith | So |
| DB | 42 | Austin Boyle | Sr |
| DB | 43 | Davis Boyle | Sr |
| JR | 44 | Bay Amrhein | Jr |
| DB | 45 | Brandon McCladdie | Jr |
| LB | 46 | Ian Thompson | So |
| LB | 47 | Caleb Bennett | Fr |
| LB | 48 | Taylor Jurney | Fr |
| DB | 48 | Will Turner | So |
| LB | 49 | James Riley | Fr |
| LB | 53 | Isaac Minor | So |
| LB | 55 | Stephen Rohrlack | So |
| LB | 58 | Austin Harrell | Fr |
| DL | 61 | Edward Kim | So |
| DL | 62 | Mitchell Jeter | Fr |
| DL | 72 | Cameron Mobley | So |
| DL | 77 | Chris Billingslea | Sr |
| DL | 87 | Paul Brown | Fr |
| DL | 88 | Zach Carter | Fr |
| DL | 90 | Austin Knisley | So |
| DL | 91 | Derek Douglas | Jr |
| LB | 92 | Mark Thomas | Fr |
| DL | 93 | Sammy Ojjeh | So |
| LB | 94 | Aaron Perry | Fr |
| DL | 95 | Colin Parsons | Fr |
| DL | 96 | Justin Oxendine | So |
| DL | 97 | Joe Phillips | Fr |
| LB | 98 | Koty Allen | Fr |

Special teams

| Pos. | # | Name | Class |
|---|---|---|---|
| K | 30 | Thomas Warren | Sr |
| K | 35 | Mason Wachter | So |
| P | 36 | Cass Couey | Sr |
| LS | 51 | Stiles Monteith | So |
| LS | 52 | Thomas Oswald | Sr |
| LS | 53 | Austin Wiles | Jr |
| LS | 60 | Hunter Morris | Fr |
| P | 86 | Austin Jordan | Fr |
| K | 99 | Eric Goins | Fr |

Head coach

- Kevin Higgins

Coordinators/assistant coaches

- Denny Doornboos (DC)
- Bob Bodine (OC)
- Aashon Larkins (ST)
- Craig Candeto (QB)

Legend

- (C) Team captain
- (S) Suspended
- (I) Ineligible
- Injured
- Redshirt

Roster
Last update: August 15, 2012

== Awards and honors ==
=== SoCon Players of the Week ===
Week One

- Chris Billingslea, Defense

Week Two

- Thomas Warren, Freshman

Week Three

- Ben Dupree Offense
- Carson Smith, Defense

=== All-Americans ===
- AFCA - Mike Sellers, C

== Ranking movements ==
Ranking movements Legend: ██ Increase in ranking ██ Decrease in ranking — = Not ranked RV = Received votes
| | Week | | | | | | | | | | | | | | | | |
| Poll | Pre | 1 | 2 | 3 | 4 | 5 | 6 | 7 | 8 | 9 | 10 | 11 | 12 | 13 | 14 | 15 | Final |
|---|---|---|---|---|---|---|---|---|---|---|---|---|---|---|---|---|---|
| Sports Network | RV | RV | 21 | 10 | 11 | 19 | RV | RV | RV | | | | | | | | |
| Coaches | — | — | 23 | 14 | 15 | 22 | RV | RV | RV | | | | | | | | |
