= 2012 Furman Paladins football team =

American college football season

2012 Furman Paladins football
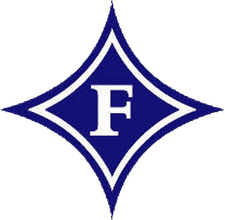
- Conference: Southern Conference
- Record: 3–8 (2–6 SoCon)
- Head coach: Bruce Fowler (2nd season)
- Offensive coordinator: Jimmy Kiser (2nd season)
- Defensive coordinator: John Windham (2nd season)
- Captains: Colin Anderson; Josh Lynn; Mitch McGrath
- Home stadium: Paladin Stadium

2012 Southern Conference football standings
	Conf.			Overall
Team	W		L	W		L
No. 6 Georgia Southern +^	6	–	2	10	–	4
No. 9 Wofford +^	6	–	2	9	–	4
No. 7 Appalachian State +^	6	–	2	8	–	4
The Citadel	5	–	3	7	–	4
Samford	5	–	3	7	–	4
Chattanooga	5	–	3	6	–	5
Furman	2	–	6	3	–	8
Elon	1	–	7	3	–	8
Western Carolina	0	–	8	1	–	10
+ – Conference co-champions; ^ – FCS playoff participant; Rankings from The Sports Network Poll

The 2012 Furman Paladins team represented Furman University as a member of the Southern Conference (SoCon) during the 2012 NCAA Division I FCS football season. Led by second-year head coach Bruce Fowler, the Paladins compiled an overall record of 3–8 with a mark of 2–6 in conference play, placing seventh in the SoCon. Furman played home games at Paladin Stadium in Greenville, South Carolina.

== Schedule ==
Date	Time	Opponent	Site	TV	Result	Attendance
September 1	4:30 pm	at Samford	Seibert Stadium; Homewood, AL	CSS	L 21–24	6,712
September 8	5:00 pm	Coastal Carolina*	Paladin Stadium; Greenville, SC	PHD	L 45–47 ^{3OT}	7,156
September 15	3:00 pm	at No. 11 (FBS) Clemson*	Memorial Stadium; Clemson, SC	ESPN3	L 7–41	83,574
September 22	12:00 pm	at Presbyterian*	Bailey Memorial Stadium; Clinton, SC	CSS	W 31–21	5,370
September 29	1:30 pm	Western Carolina	Paladin Stadium; Greenville, SC	PHD	W 45–24	10,218
October 6	1:30 pm	at No. 6 Wofford	Gibbs Stadium; Spartanburg, SC (rivalry)		L 17–20	9,170
October 13	1:30 pm	Chattanooga	Paladin Stadium; Greenville, SC	ESPN3	L 10–31	8,351
October 20	1:30 pm	No. 3 Georgia Southern^{†}	Paladin Stadium; Greenville, SC	PHD	L 17–38	11,191
October 27	3:00 pm	at Elon	Rhodes Stadium; Elon, NC		W 31–17	6,158
November 10	3:30 pm	at No. 12 Appalachian State	Kidd Brewer Stadium; Boone, NC		L 28–33	28,986
November 17	1:30 pm	The Citadel	Paladin Stadium; Greenville, SC	ESPN3	L 20–42	8,127
*Non-conference game; ^{†}Homecoming; Rankings from The Sports Network Poll released prior to the game; All times are in Eastern time
