= Kevin Higgins (American football) =

American football player and coach (born 1955)

Current position
- Title: Chief of Staff/Pass Game Specialist
- Team: Appalachian State
- Conference: Sun Belt

Biographical details
- Born: December 1, 1955 (age 70); Emerson, New Jersey, U.S.

Playing career
- 1973–1976: West Chester
- Position: Safety

Coaching career (HC unless noted)
- 1977–1978: Emerson HS (NJ) (assistant)
- 1979–1980: North Warren HS (NJ) (assistant)
- 1981–1984: Gettysburg (assistant)
- 1985–1987: Richmond (assistant)
- 1988–1993: Lehigh (assistant)
- 1994–2000: Lehigh
- 2001–2003: Detroit Lions (QB)
- 2004: Detroit Lions (WR)
- 2005–2013: The Citadel
- 2014–2024: Wake Forest (AHC/WR)
- 2025–present: Appalachian State (Pass Game Specialist)

Head coaching record
- Overall: 99–83–1
- Tournaments: 2–3 (NCAA D-I-AA playoffs)

Accomplishments and honors

Championships
- 4 Patriot (1995, 1998–2000)

Awards
- 3× Patriot Coach of the Year (1995, 1998, 2000); 1× SoCon Coach of the Year (2012)

Kevin Higgins (born December 1, 1955) is an American football coach. On December 16, 2013, he resigned his long-time position as head football coach at The Citadel to accept an assistant head coach position at Wake Forest. He held The Citadel position from 2005 through 2013. Prior to his position with The Citadel, Higgins was head football coach at Lehigh University from 1994 through 2000. He played college football at West Chester University.

A native of Emerson, New Jersey, he played football at Emerson Jr./Sr. High School, and coached at his alma mater from 1977 to 1978.

Prior to receiving the head coaching position at Lehigh, Higgins held assistant coaching positions at Gettysburg and Richmond. During the interim between Lehigh and The Citadel, Higgins served as quarterbacks and wide receivers coach for the Detroit Lions of the National Football League.

== Coaching career ==
=== The Citadel ===
Following a 7–4 campaign that featured wins over SoCon tri-champs Georgia Southern and Appalachian State, Higgins was named Southern Conference Coach of the Year. Higgins placed two former Bulldogs in the NFL, WR Andre Roberts and CB Cortez Allen of the Arizona Cardinals and Pittsburgh Steelers, respectively.

On April 2, 2025, App State Football head coach Dowell Loggains announced Wednesday the hiring of former college head coach and NFL assistant coach Kevin Higgins as Chief of Staff/Pass Game Specialist.

== Head coaching record ==
Year	Team	Overall	Conference	Standing	Bowl/playoffs	TSN^{#}
Lehigh Engineers / Mountain Hawks (Patriot League) (1994–2000)
1994	Lehigh	5–5–1	3–2	T–2nd		
1995	Lehigh	8–3	5–0	1st		
1996	Lehigh	5–6	3–2	T–2nd		
1997	Lehigh	4–7	2–4	T–4th		
1998	Lehigh	12–1	6–0	1st	L NCAA Division I-AA Quarterfinal	12
1999	Lehigh	10–2	5–1	T–1st	L NCAA Division I-AA First Round	14
2000	Lehigh	12–1	6–0	1st	L NCAA Division I-AA Quarterfinal	8
Lehigh:		56–25–1	30–9			
The Citadel Bulldogs (Southern Conference) (2005–2013)
2005	The Citadel	4–7	2–5	7th		
2006	The Citadel	5–6	4–3	4th		
2007	The Citadel	7–4	4–3	T–3rd		
2008	The Citadel	4–8	2–6	7th		
2009	The Citadel	4–7	2–6	7th		
2010	The Citadel	3–8	1–7	T–8th		
2011	The Citadel	4–7	2–6	8th		
2012	The Citadel	7–4	5–3	T–4th		
2013	The Citadel	5–7	4–4	T–4th		
The Citadel:		43–58	26–43			
Total:		99–83–1				
National championship Conference title Conference division title or championship game berth
^{#}Sports Network FCS Poll.
