= 2012 Chattanooga Mocs football team =

American college football season

2012 Chattanooga Mocs football
- Conference: Southern Conference
- Record: 6–5 (5–3 SoCon)
- Head coach: Russ Huesman (4th season)
- Offensive coordinator: Marcus Satterfield (4th season)
- Defensive coordinator: Adam Fuller (4th season)
- Home stadium: Finley Stadium

2012 Southern Conference football standings
| | Conf. | | | Overall |
| Team | W | | L | W | | L |
|---|---|---|---|---|---|---|
| No. 6 Georgia Southern +^ | 6 | – | 2 | 10 | – | 4 |
| No. 9 Wofford +^ | 6 | – | 2 | 9 | – | 4 |
| No. 7 Appalachian State +^ | 6 | – | 2 | 8 | – | 4 |
| The Citadel | 5 | – | 3 | 7 | – | 4 |
| Samford | 5 | – | 3 | 7 | – | 4 |
| Chattanooga | 5 | – | 3 | 6 | – | 5 |
| Furman | 2 | – | 6 | 3 | – | 8 |
| Elon | 1 | – | 7 | 3 | – | 8 |
| Western Carolina | 0 | – | 8 | 1 | – | 10 |
+ – Conference co-champions; ^ – FCS playoff participant; Rankings from The Sports Network Poll

The 2012 Chattanooga Mocs football team represented the University of Tennessee at Chattanooga as a member of the Southern Conference (SoCon)in the 2012 NCAA Division I FCS football season. They were led by fourth-year head coach Russ Huesman and played their home games at Finley Stadium. They finished the season 6–5 overall and 5–3 in SoCon play to place in a three-way tie for fourth.

== Schedule ==
| Date | Time | Opponent | Site | TV | Result | Attendance |
|---|---|---|---|---|---|---|
| September 1 | 7:00 pm | at South Florida* | Raymond James Stadium; Tampa, FL | ESPN3 | L 13–34 | 41,285 |
| September 8 | 7:00 pm | at No. 24 Jacksonville State* | JSU Stadium; Jacksonville, AL | | L 24–27 | 18,993 |
| September 13 | 7:00 pm | Glenville State* | Finley Stadium; Chattanooga, TN | | W 35–0 | 9,077 |
| September 22 | 6:00 pm | Appalachian State | Finley Stadium; Chattanooga, TN | | L 17–34 | 13,726 |
| September 29 | 6:00 pm | at No. 11 The Citadel | Johnson Hagood Stadium; Charleston, SC | | W 28–10 | 13,878 |
| October 13 | 1:30 pm | at Furman | Paladin Stadium; Greenville, SC | ESPN3 | W 31–10 | 8,351 |
| October 20 | 6:00 pm | Samford | Finley Stadium; Chattanooga, TN | | W 20–13 | 7,103 |
| October 27 | 6:00 pm | No. 2 Georgia Southern | Finley Stadium; Chattanooga, TN | | L 31–39 ^{3OT} | 8,908 |
| November 3 | 3:30 pm | at Western Carolina | E.J Whitmire Stadium; Cullowhee, NC | | W 45–24 | 7,099 |
| November 10 | 1:30 pm | at No. 13 Wofford | Gibbs Stadium; Spartanburg, SC | | L 13–16 ^{OT} | 8,112 |
| November 17 | 2:00 pm | Elon | Finley Stadium; Chattanooga, TN | | W 24–17 | 8,791 |
*Non-conference game; Rankings from The Sports Network Poll released prior to the game; All times are in Eastern time
