= Wofford Terriers football =

Football team of Wofford College

2026 Wofford Terriers football team
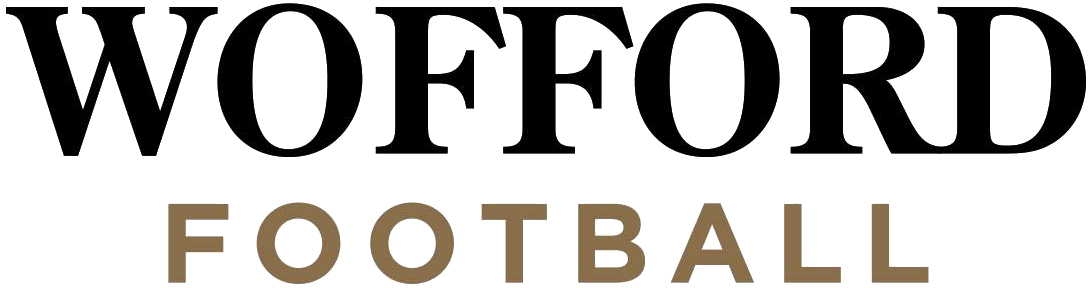
- First season: 1889; 137 years ago
- Athletic director: Scott Kull
- Head coach: Shawn Watson; 3rd season, 10–19 (.345)
- Location: Spartanburg, South Carolina
- Stadium: Gibbs Stadium (capacity: 13,000)
- NCAA division: Division I FCS
- Conference: Southern
- Colors: Old gold and black
- All-time record: 478–467–35 (.506)
- Bowl record: 0–1 (.000)

Conference championships
- SoCon: 2003, 2007, 2010, 2012, 2017, 2018, 2019
- Rivalries: The Citadel (rivalry); Furman (rivalry)
- Mascot: Terriers
- Website: woffordterriers.com

The Wofford Terriers football program is the intercollegiate American football team for Wofford College located in the U.S. state of South Carolina. The team competes in the NCAA Division I Football Championship Subdivision (FCS) as members of the Southern Conference (SoCon). Wofford's first football team was fielded in 1889. The team plays its home games at the 13,000 seat Gibbs Stadium in Spartanburg, South Carolina. Shawn Watson is the current head coach for the Terriers.

== History ==
Wofford fielded its first football team in 1889. That season, Wofford and Furman played the first intercollegiate football game in South Carolina. There is no record of more than four games in a season before 1900.

Wofford moved from Division II to join the Division I-AA Southern Conference in the 1996–97 season. Since then, Wofford has won 7 Southern Conference Championships, and received bids to the FCS Playoffs 10 times with the most recent bid coming in 2019. Wofford is typically one of the strongest teams in the Southern Conference every year.

Wofford's best finish since moving from Division II was a trip to the National Semi-finals at Delaware in 2003, where they fell 24–9. Mike Ayers, Wofford's winningest and most honored coach who served as head coach for thirty years, retired following the 2017 season, when Wofford made it to the national quarterfinals and finished #8 in the national polls. In recent years, Wofford's football and other athletic teams have finished near the top in the country in APR, which measures academic performance of athletes. Numerous football players have been elected to Phi Beta Kappa.

=== Classifications ===
- 1957–1969: NAIA
- 1970–1987: NAIA Division I
- 1988–1994: NCAA Division II
- 1995–present: NCAA Division I–AA/FCS

=== Conference memberships ===
- 1889–1900: Independent
- 1901–1941: Southern Intercollegiate Athletic Association
- 1942–1945: Independent
- 1946–1964: South Carolina Little Three
- 1965–1987: NAIA Independent
- 1988–1994: NCAA Division II independent
- 1995–1996: NCAA Division I–AA independent
- 1997–present: Southern Conference

== Conference championships ==
Wofford has won seven conference championships, three outright and four shared.

Season	Conference	Coach	Overall record	Conference record
2003	Southern Conference	Mike Ayers	12–2	8–0
2007†	Southern Conference	Mike Ayers	9–4	5–2
2010†	Southern Conference	Mike Ayers	10–3	7–1
2012†	Southern Conference	Mike Ayers	9–4	6–2
2017	Southern Conference	Mike Ayers	10–3	7–1
2018†	Southern Conference	Josh Conklin	9–4	6–2
2019	Southern Conference	Josh Conklin	8–5	7–1

† denotes co–champions

== Bowl game appearances ==
Season	Coach	Bowl	Opponent	Result
1949	Phil Dickens	Cigar Bowl	Florida State	L 6–19

== Playoff appearances ==
=== NCAA Division I-AA/FCS ===
The Terriers have appeared in the I-AA/FCS playoffs ten times with an overall record of 9–10.

Year	Round	Opponent	Result
2003	First Round; Quarterfinals; Semifinals	North Carolina A&T; Western Kentucky; Delaware	W 31–0; W 34–17; L 9–24
2007	First Round; Quarterfinals	Montana; Richmond	W 23–22; L 10–21
2008	First Round	James Madison	L 35–38
2010	Second Round; Quarterfinals	Jacksonville State; Georgia Southern	W 17–14; L 20–23
2011	Second Round	Northern Iowa	L 21–28
2012	Second Round; Quarterfinals	New Hampshire; North Dakota State	W 23–7; L 7–14
2016	First Round; Second Round; Quarterfinals	Charleston Southern; The Citadel; Youngstown State	W 15–14; W 17–3; L 23–30 ^{2OT}
2017	Second Round; Quarterfinals	Furman; North Dakota State	W 28–10; L 10–42
2018	First Round; Second Round	Elon; Kennesaw State	W 19–7; L 10–13
2019	First Round	Kennesaw State	L 21–28

=== NCAA Division II ===
The Terriers have appeared in the Division II playoffs two times with an overall record of 0–2.

Year	Round	Opponent	Result
1990	First Round	Mississippi College	L 19–70
1991	First Round	Mississippi College	L 15–28

=== NAIA ===
The Terriers appeared in the NAIA playoffs one time. Their combined record was 1–1.

Year	Round	Opponent	Result
1970	Semifinals; National Championship Game	New Mexico Highlands; Texas A&I	W, 28–23; L, 7–48

== Wofford vs. in-state NCAA Division I schools ==
School	Record	Percentage	Streak	First meeting	Last meeting
Charleston Southern	14–0	1.000	Won 14	1993	2016
Clemson	3–13	.200	Lost 5	1896	2019
Coastal Carolina	0–1	.000	Lost 1	2006	2006
Furman	33–54–7	.388	Won 1	1889	2019
Presbyterian	41–40–3	.506	Won 6	1914	2017
South Carolina	4–20	.167	Lost 17	1895	2017
South Carolina State	6–3	.667	Lost 1	1974	2019
The Citadel	30–42–1	.418	Won 4	1916	2019
Total: 124–169–11

== Notable former players ==
- Brenton Bersin, former wide receiver for the Carolina Panthers of the National Football League (NFL)
- Miles Brown, former defensive lineman for the Tennessee Titans
- Fisher DeBerry, former head coach at Air Force and College Football Hall of Famer
- Ameet Pall, former defensive end in the Canadian Football League (CFL)
- Kasey Redfern, former NFL punter
- Jerry Richardson, wide receiver for the Baltimore Colts, former owner of the Carolina Panthers.
- Nate Woody, Defensive coordinator at Army
- Shiel Wood, Defensive coordinator at Houston
- Greg Gasparato, Defensive coordinator at Tulane

== Yearly results ==
Year	Coach	Win	Loss	Tie
1889	Edwin Kerrison	2	0	0
1890		0	2	0
1893		0	1	0
1894		0	1	0
1895	William Wertenbaker	3	1	0
1896		2	2	0
1900		1	2	1
1901	J. Norman Walker	2	3	0
1914	Curtis McCoy	1	6	1
1915	Harvey Hester	3	5	0
1916	Leslie Moser	2	7	0
1917	Leslie Moser	5	4	0
1918	Bernard Peters	0	3	0
1919	J.P. Major	3	2	1
1920	John F. Gorsuch	0	8	1
1921	John Gilroy	2	7	0
1922	J.P. Major	2	7	0
1923	J.P. Major	6	3	0
1924	J.P. Major	3	7	0
1925	J.P. Major	3	7	0
1926	J.P. Major	2	8	0
1927	Tommy Scaffe	2	4	3
1928	Tommy Scaffe	7	2	1
1929	Tommy Scaffe	3	6	0
1930	Tommy Scaffe	2	9	0
1931	Tommy Scaffe	4	5	0
1932	Tommy Scaffe	3	6	1
1933	Tommy Scaffe	3	6	0
1934	Jules Carson	4	4	1
1935	Jules Carson	4	4	1
1936	Jules Carson	1	7	1
1937	Jules Carson	2	7	0
1938	Jules Carson	0	8	1
1939	Jules Carson	1	5	3
1940	Jules Carson	3	4	2
1941	Jules Carson	4	6	0
1942	Ted Petoskey	2	5	0
1946	Ted Petoskey	1	8	0
1947	Phil Dickens	6	5	0
1948	Phil Dickens	4	0	5
1949	Phil Dickens	11	1	0
1950	Phil Dickens	7	2	1
1951	Phil Dickens	6	3	1
1952	Phil Dickens	6	5	0
1953	Conley Snidow	6	4	1
1954	Conley Snidow	8	2	0
1955	Conley Snidow	7	4	0
1956	Conley Snidow	7	3	0
1957	Conley Snidow	8	2	0
1958	Conley Snidow	3	7	0
1959	Conley Snidow	5	5	0
1960	Conley Snidow	5	3	0
1961	Conley Snidow	5	4	2
1962	Conley Snidow	2	8	0
1963	Conley Snidow	4	6	0
1964	Conley Snidow	6	4	0
1965	Conley Snidow	5	4	0
1966	Conley Snidow	6	3	1
1967	Jim Brakefield	4	6	0
1968	Jim Brakefield	4	7	0
1969	Jim Brakefield	9	2	0
1970	Jim Brakefield	11	1	0
1971	Jack Peterson	6	4	0
1972	Jack Peterson	6	4	0
1973	Jack Peterson	4	6	1
1974	Steve Satterfield	7	4	0
1975	Steve Satterfield	7	3	1
1976	Steve Satterfield	4	7	0
1977	Buddy Sasser	7	3	1
1978	Buddy Sasser	3	8	0
1979	Buddy Sasser	5	5	0
1980	Buddy Sasser	7	2	2
1981	Buddy Sasser	6	5	0
1982	Buddy Sasser	8	3	0
1983	Bill Parker	6	5	0
1984	Bill Parker	2	9	0
1985	Rick Gilstrap	3	8	0
1986	Rick Gilstrap	4	6	1
1987	Rick Gilstrap	1	10	0
1988	Mike Ayers	5	5	0
1989	Mike Ayers	6	5	0
1990	Mike Ayers	9	3	0
1991	Mike Ayers	9	3	0
1992	Mike Ayers	6	5	0
1993	Mike Ayers	7	3	1
1994	Mike Ayers	5	6	0
1995	Mike Ayers	4	7	0
1996	Mike Ayers	6	5	0
1997	Mike Ayers	3	7	0
1998	Mike Ayers	4	7	0
1999	Mike Ayers	6	5	0
2000	Mike Ayers	7	4	0
2001	Mike Ayers	4	7	0
2002	Mike Ayers	9	3	0
2003	Mike Ayers	12	2	0
2004	Mike Ayers	8	3	0
2005	Mike Ayers	6	5	0
2006	Mike Ayers	7	4	0
2007	Mike Ayers	9	4	0
2008	Mike Ayers	9	3	0
2009	Mike Ayers	3	8	0
2010	Mike Ayers	10	3	0
2011	Mike Ayers	8	4	0
2012	Mike Ayers	9	4	0
2013	Mike Ayers	5	6	0
2014	Mike Ayers	6	5	0
2015	Mike Ayers	5	6	0
2016	Mike Ayers	10	4	0
2017	Mike Ayers	10	3	0
2018	Josh Conklin	9	4	0
2019	Josh Conklin	8	4	0
2020	Josh Conklin	1	4	0
2021	Josh Conklin	1	10	0
2022	Josh Conklin	0	5	0
2022	Shawn Watson	3	3	0
2023	Shawn Watson	2	9	0
Total		551	543	36

== Future non-conference opponents ==
Announced schedules as of May 12, 2026.

2026	2027	2028	2029
Gardner–Webb	at Clemson	at South Carolina	at Charlotte
at Kent State	South Carolina State	at Harvard	
at Elon			
at Ole Miss			
