= 1931 East Tennessee State Teachers football team =

American college football season

1931 East Tennessee State Teachers football
- Conference: Smoky Mountain Conference
- Record: 1–4–2 (0–1–2 Smoky Mountain)
- Head coach: Jack S. Batey (2nd season)
- Captain: Alex Kennedy

1931 Smoky Mountain Conference football standings
	Conf.					Overall
Team	W		L		T	W		L		T
Maryville (TN) $	2	–	0	–	1	5	–	2	–	3
Carson–Newman	3	–	1	–	1	6	–	2	–	1
Tusculum	2	–	1	–	1	6	–	1	–	1
King	1	–	2	–	1	2	–	7	–	1
Lincoln Memorial	1	–	3	–	1	4	–	7	–	1
Milligan	0	–	1	–	3	2	–	2	–	4
East Tennessee State Teachers	0	–	1	–	2	1	–	4	–	2
$ – Conference champion

The 1931 East Tennessee State Teachers football team was an American football team that East Tennessee State Teacher's College, Johnson City—now known as East Tennessee State University (ETSU)—as a member of the Smoky Mountain Conference in the 1931 college football season. They were led by second-year head coach Jack S. Batey, who was a graduate of Middle Tennessee State Normal School (B.S.) and University of Tennessee (M.S.). He coached football and basketball for two years and baseball for six years and taught physical education and agriculture from 1930 to 1935 at the school. It was Batey's final year of coaching football at the school.

== Schedule ==
Date	Opponent	Site	Result	Source
October 3	Mars Hill*	Johnson City, TN	W 18–0	
October 10	at Bluefield*	Bluefield, WV	L 0–39	
October 16	at Hiwassee*	Madisonville, TN	L 6–24	
October 24	Lincoln Memorial	Johnson City, TN	T 6–6	
October 31	at Union (KY)*	Barbourville, KY	L 0–18	
November 19	King	Johnson City, TN	L 6–13	
November 25	Tusculum	Johnson City, TN	T 6–6	
*Non-conference game
