= Rick Gilstrap =

American football coach and former quarterback/running back

Playing career
- 1969–1971: Clemson
- Positions: Quarterback, running back

Coaching career (HC unless noted)
- 1973: Furman (GA)
- 1974–1976: Tulsa (DB)
- 1977: Wofford (DB/K)
- 1978–1982: Citadel (OC)
- 1983–1984: Mars Hill
- 1985–1987: Wofford
- 1996–2009: Lexington HS (SC) (assistant)
- 2012–2013: Ben Lippen School (SC) (QB/K/OC 2013)

Head coaching record
- Overall: 18–35-2

Rick Gilstrap is an American former football player and coach. He served as the head football coach at Mars Hill University in Mars Hill, North Carolina from 1983 to 1984 and at Wofford College in Spartanburg, South Carolina from 1985 to 1987, compiling a career college football coaching record of 18–35-2. Gilstrap helped guide Wofford's transition from the National Association of Intercollegiate Athletics (NAIA) to the National Collegiate Athletic Association (NCAA). Gilstrap played college football at Clemson University between 1969 and 1971, starting 18 games at running back or quarterback. He has been married to Kiki Kirkland Gilstrap, Miss USA 1973 Miss Congeniality since 1977, and they are the parents of award-winning, professional soccer goalkeeper and coach, Hunter Gilstrap.

== Head coaching record ==
Year	Team	Overall	Conference	Standing	Bowl/playoffs
Mars Hill Lions (SAC-8) (1983–1984)
1983	Mars Hill	4–6–1	3–3–1	5th	
1984	Mars Hill	6–5	4–3	5th	
Mars Hill:		10–11–1	7–6–1		
Wofford Terriers (NAIA Division I independent) (1985–1987)
1985	Wofford	3–8			
1986	Wofford	4–6–1			
1987	Wofford	1–10			
Wofford:		8–24–1			
Total:		18–35–2			
