= 2012 Western Carolina Catamounts football team =

American college football season

2012 Western Carolina Catamounts football
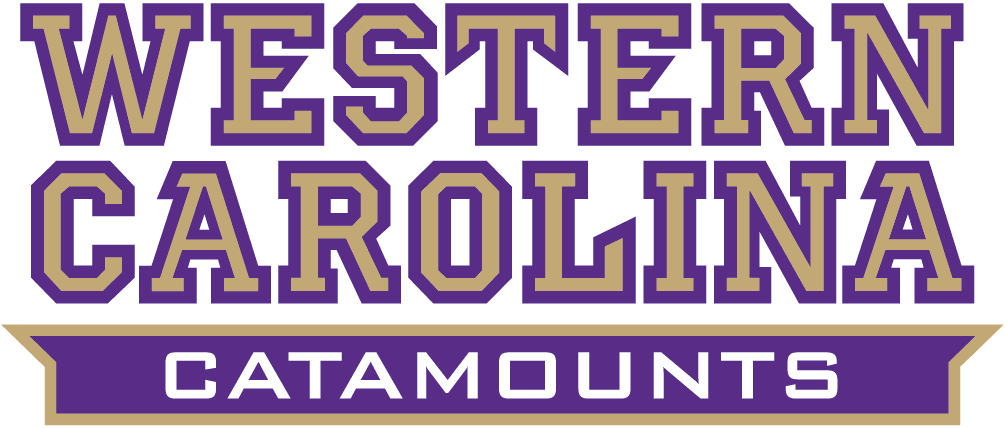
- Conference: Southern Conference
- Record: 1–10 (0–8 SoCon)
- Head coach: Mark Speir (1st season)
- Offensive coordinator: Brad Glenn (1st season)
- Defensive coordinator: Curtis Walker (1st season)
- Home stadium: Bob Waters Field at E. J. Whitmire Stadium

2012 Southern Conference football standings
	Conf.			Overall
Team	W		L	W		L
No. 6 Georgia Southern +^	6	–	2	10	–	4
No. 9 Wofford +^	6	–	2	9	–	4
No. 7 Appalachian State +^	6	–	2	8	–	4
The Citadel	5	–	3	7	–	4
Samford	5	–	3	7	–	4
Chattanooga	5	–	3	6	–	5
Furman	2	–	6	3	–	8
Elon	1	–	7	3	–	8
Western Carolina	0	–	8	1	–	10
+ – Conference co-champions; ^ – FCS playoff participant; Rankings from The Sports Network Poll

The 2012 Western Carolina Catamounts team represented Western Carolina University as a member of the Southern Conference (SoCon) during the 2012 NCAA Division I FCS football season. Led by first-year head coach Mark Speir, the Catamounts compiled an overall record of 1–10 with a mark of 0–8 in conference play, placing last out of nine teams in the SoCon. Western Carolina played home games at Bob Waters Field at E. J. Whitmire Stadium in Cullowhee, North Carolina.

== Schedule ==
Date	Time	Opponent	Site	TV	Result	Attendance
August 30	7:00 pm	Mars Hill*	Bob Waters Field at E. J. Whitmire Stadium; Cullowhee, NC		W 42–14	7,094
September 8	7:00 pm	at Marshall*	Joan C. Edwards Stadium; Huntington, WV	FCS	L 24–52	25,317
September 15	7:00 pm	at No. 9 Wofford	Gibbs Stadium; Spartanburg, SC		L 20–49	8,544
September 22	3:30 pm	Samford	Bob Waters Field at E. J. Whitmire Stadium; Cullowhee, NC		L 21–25	10,112
September 29	1:30 pm	at Furman	Paladin Stadium; Greenville, SC		L 24–45	10,218
October 6	3:30 pm	No. 8 Georgia Southern^{†}	Bob Waters Field at E. J. Whitmire Stadium; Cullowhee, NC		L 13–45	9,514
October 13	2:00 pm	at The Citadel	Johnson Hagood Stadium; Charleston, SC		L 31–45	12,578
October 20	3:00 pm	at Elon	Rhodes Stadium; Elon, NC	ESPN3	L 31–42	10,154
October 27	3:30 pm	No. 16 Appalachian State	Bob Waters Field at E. J. Whitmire Stadium; Cullowhee, NC (Battle for the Old Mountain Jug)		L 27–38	13,279
November 3	3:30 pm	Chattanooga	Bob Waters Field at E. J. Whitmire Stadium; Cullowhee, NC		L 24–45	7,099
November 17	12:21 pm	at No. 4 (FBS) Alabama*	Bryant–Denny Stadium; Tuscaloosa, AL	SECN	L 0–49	101,126
*Non-conference game; ^{†}Homecoming; Rankings from The Sports Network Poll released prior to the game; All times are in Eastern time
