= Gunner Britton =

American football player (born 2000)

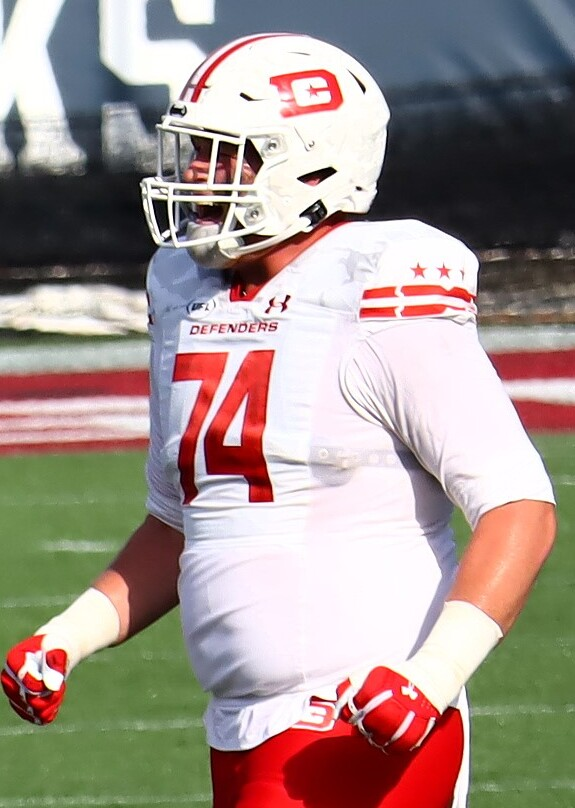
- Britton in 2025

No. 74
- Position: Guard

Personal information
- Born: February 29, 2000 (age 26); Conway, South Carolina, U.S.
- Listed height: 6 ft 6 in (1.98 m)
- Listed weight: 315 lb (143 kg)

Career information
- High school: Conway
- College: Western Kentucky (2018–2022); Auburn (2023)
- NFL draft: 2024: undrafted

Career history
- Buffalo Bills (2024)*; DC Defenders (2025); Detroit Lions (2025)*; DC Defenders (2026)
- * Offseason or practice squad member only

Awards and highlights
- UFL champion (2025); Second-team All-SEC (2023); Second team All-Conference USA (2022); Freshman team All-Conference USA (2019)

Gunner Britton (born February 29, 2000) is an American former professional football guard for the DC Defenders of the United Football League (UFL). He played college football for the Western Kentucky Hilltoppers and the Auburn Tigers.

== Early life ==
Britton grew up in Conway, South Carolina and attended Conway High School where he lettered in football and baseball. He was rated as a two-star recruit and committed to play college football for Western Kentucky University.

== College career ==
=== Western Kentucky ===
Britton was redshirted during his true freshman season in 2018. During the 2019 season, he appeared in all-but-one game and started the first two, finishing the season with 139 total offensive snaps including 50 in the season opener against Central Arkansas and the second game against FIU. During the 2020 season, he appeared in all 12 games and started two of them, finishing the season with 52 total offensive snaps including 41 of them as a sixth offensive lineman and a season high 14 against Louisville. During the 2021 season, he played in 13 games, finishing the season with 17 sacks making it the 12th best in college football and second best within the Conference USA. During the 2022 season, he played in and started all 14 games, finishing the season with a reception for 12 yards and 14 sacks making it the 10th best in college football and second best within the Conference USA. He also helped the team win the 2022 New Orleans Bowl.

On November 29, 2022, prior to playing in the New Orleans Bowl, Britton announced that he would enter the transfer portal.

=== Auburn ===
On January 6, 2023, Britton announced that he would transfer to Auburn.

During the 2023 season, he played in and started all 13 games including the 2023 Music City Bowl. He was the team game captain for three games, was named the SEC offensive lineman of the week for two consecutive weeks and played in the 2024 Hula Bowl.

== Professional career ==
Pre-draft measurables
Height	Weight	Arm length	Hand span	Wingspan	40-yard dash	10-yard split	20-yard split	20-yard shuttle	Three-cone drill	Vertical jump	Broad jump	Bench press
6 ft 6 1/2 in (1.99 m)	304 lb (138 kg)	34 3/8 in (0.87 m)	9 5/8 in (0.24 m)	6 ft 11 1/8 in (2.11 m)	5.31 s	1.72 s	2.95 s	4.78 s	8.19 s	32.5 in (0.83 m)	8 ft 11 in (2.72 m)	22 reps
All values from Pro Day

=== Buffalo Bills ===
After not being selected in the 2024 NFL draft, Britton signed with the Buffalo Bills as an undrafted free agent. He was released as part of final roster cuts on August 27.

=== DC Defenders ===
On February 5, 2025, Britton signed with the DC Defenders of the United Football League (UFL). His contract was terminated on August 10, to sign with an NFL team.

=== Detroit Lions ===
On August 10, 2025, Britton signed with the Detroit Lions. He was waived on August 26 as part of final roster cuts.

On January 21, 2026, Britton retired from football.

=== DC Defenders (second stint) ===
On June 1, 2026, Britton signed with the DC Defenders.
