= 2012 Elon Phoenix football team =

American college football season

2012 Elon Phoenix football
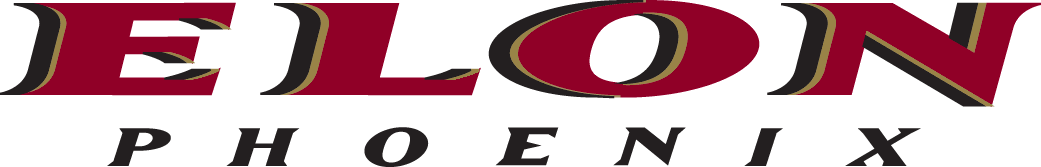
- Conference: Southern Conference
- Record: 3–8 (1–7 SoCon)
- Head coach: Jason Swepson (2nd season)
- Offensive coordinator: Chris Pincince (2nd season)
- Defensive coordinator: Ed Pinkham (2nd season)
- Home stadium: Rhodes Stadium

2012 Southern Conference football standings
	Conf.			Overall
Team	W		L	W		L
No. 6 Georgia Southern +^	6	–	2	10	–	4
No. 9 Wofford +^	6	–	2	9	–	4
No. 7 Appalachian State +^	6	–	2	8	–	4
The Citadel	5	–	3	7	–	4
Samford	5	–	3	7	–	4
Chattanooga	5	–	3	6	–	5
Furman	2	–	6	3	–	8
Elon	1	–	7	3	–	8
Western Carolina	0	–	8	1	–	10
+ – Conference co-champions; ^ – FCS playoff participant; Rankings from The Sports Network poll

The 2012 Elon Phoenix football team represented Elon University in the 2012 NCAA Division I FCS football season. They were led by second-year head coach Jason Swepson and played their home games at Rhodes Stadium. They are a member of the Southern Conference. They finished the season 3–8, 1–7 in SoCon play to finish in eighth place.

== Schedule ==
Date	Time	Opponent	Site	TV	Result	Attendance
September 1	12:30 pm	at North Carolina*	Kenan Memorial Stadium; Chapel Hill, NC		L 0–62	50,500
September 8	7:00 pm	North Carolina Central*	Rhodes Stadium; Elon, NC		W 34–14	7,528
September 15	3:00 pm	West Virginia State*	Rhodes Stadium; Elon, NC		W 48–14	7,053
September 22	6:00 pm	at No. 11 Georgia Southern	Paulson Stadium; Statesboro, GA		L 23–26	18,353
September 29	1:30 pm	No. 6 Wofford	Rhodes Stadium; Elon, NC		L 24–49	10,302
October 6	3:30 pm	at No. 15 Appalachian State	Kidd Brewer Stadium; Boone, NC		L 23–35	29,073
October 20	3:00 pm	Western Carolina^{†}	Rhodes Stadium; Elon, NC	ESPN3	W 42–31	10,154
October 27	3:00 pm	Furman	Rhodes Stadium; Elon, NC		L 17–31	6,158
November 3	2:00 pm	at The Citadel	Johnson Hagood Stadium; Charleston, SC		L 24–38	14,853
November 10	1:30 pm	Samford	Rhodes Stadium; Elon, NC		L 15–26	6,231
November 17	2:00 pm	at Chattanooga	Finley Stadium; Chattanooga, TN		L 17–24	8,791
*Non-conference game; ^{†}Homecoming; Rankings from The Sports Network Poll released prior to the game; All times are in Eastern time

- Source: Schedule

== Players ==
- 2 Miles Williams DB 6-1 208 So. Roebuck, S.C. / Dorman
- 3 Aaron Mellette WR 6-4 220 Sr. Sanford, N.C. / Southern Lee
- 4 Andre Davis WR 5-10 181 R-Fr. Bunn, N.C. / Bunn
- 5 Ricky Brown WR 6-2 214 R-Fr. Winston-Salem, N.C. / West Forsyth
- 6 Blake Thompson LB 6-1 211 Sr. Elkridge, Md. / Cardinal Gibbons
- 7 Mike Quinn QB 6-3 193 So. Wayne, N.J. / Wayne Hills
- 8 Rasaun Rorie WR 6-1 206 Jr. Morven, N.C. / Anson
- 9 Blake Rice WR 5-10 189 R-Fr. Tampa, Fla. / Robinson
- 10 Karl Bostick RB 5-9 201 So. Englewood, N.J. / Univ. of Akron
- 11 John Loughery QB 6-4 213 Fr. Wayne, Pa. / Hun School
- 12 Thomas Wilson QB 6-4 222 Sr. Raleigh, N.C. / Leesville Road
- 13 Bo Hartman DB 5-8 171 Fr. Centreville, Va. / Westfield
- 13 Adam LaFleur WR 6-1 200 So. Bel Air, Md. / Fork Union Military Academy
- 14 David Williams DB 5-8 182 Jr. Chester, Va. / Thomas Dale
- 15 Tyler Smith QB 6-4 215 So. Easton, Pa. / Univ. of Maryland
- 17 Jeremy Gloston DB 6-1 198 Fr. Orlando, Fla. / Colonial
- 18 Jeremy Peterson WR 5-9 179 Sr. Winston-Salem, N.C. / R.J. Reynolds
- 20 David Wood DB 5-10 170 Jr. Park Ridge, N.J. / Saint Joseph Regional
- 21 Jerrell Armstrong DB 5-9 168 R-Fr. New Bern, N.C. / New Bern
- 22 Tracey Coppedge RB 5-8 166 Fr. Nashville, N.C. / Southern Nash
- 23 Akeem Langham DB 5-10 180 So. High Point, N.C. / High Point Central
- 24 Quinton Lightfoot LB 5-10 209 Jr. Crawfordville, Fla. / Florida State HS
- 26 Alexander Dawson LB 5-11 209 So. Haw River, N.C. / Eastern Alamance
- 27 Adrian McClendon DB 5-9 161 Fr. Jacksonville, Fla. / First Coast
- 29 Edward Burns DB 5-10 168 Jr. Sylvania, Ga. / Screven County
- 30 Julius Moore DB 5-11 195 Fr. Chesterfield, Va. / Cosby
- 31 Kierre Brown WR 5-9 168 So. Charlotte, N.C. / Independence
- 32 Adam Shreiner K 5-9 190 Sr. Marietta, Ga. / Walton
- 33 B.J. Bennett RB 6-0 204 Fr. West Columbia, S.C. / Hammond School
- 34 John Lopez LB 5-9 202 Fr. Westchester, N.Y. / Kennedy Catholic
- 35 Jordan Thompson DB 5-9 166 So. Hickory, N.C. / Hickory
- 36 Hatchel Linens DB 5-10 158 Fr. Morganton, N.C. / Patton
- 36 Thuc Phan RB 5-6 160 Fr. Greensboro, N.C. / Deerfield Academy (Mass.)
- 37 Lichota Seidewand WR 5-10 154 Fr. Chatham, Mass. / Nauset Regional
- 38 Thonda Taylor LB 5-10 228 Sr. Millington, Tenn. / Heidelberg American
- 39 Carson Simpson WR 6-0 161 Fr. Greenwood, S.C. / Greenwood
- 39 Joe Watkins DB 5-10 168 So. Hyattsville, Md. / Gonzaga College High
- 40 Matt Eastman RB 6-1 231 Jr. Tampa, Fla. / Armwood
- 41 Chandler Wrightenberry DB 5-11 202 Jr. Asheville, N.C. / T.C. Roberson
- 42 Robert Davis DL 6-1 225 R-Fr. Thomasville, N.C. / Thomasville
- 43 Evan Kendrick LB 5-9 206 R-Fr. Gahanna, Ohio / St. Francis DeSales
- 45 Tony Thompson DL 6-1 274 Jr. Simpsonville, S.C. / Hillcrest
- 46 Danny Sellers WR 6-3 200 So. St. Augustine, Fla. / Bartram Trail
- 47 Michael Crispi LS 5-10 210 So. Dix Hills, N.Y. / Half Hollow Hills West
- 48 Corey Mitchell LB 6-0 210 Fr. Jacksonville, N.C. / Northside
- 49 Ryan Seaberg DL 6-1 210 Fr. Chattanooga, Tenn. / Baylor School
- 50 John Silas LB 5-11 225 Fr. Powder Springs, Ga. / Hillgrove
- 51 Derek Vereen OL 6-3 280 R-Fr. Durham, N.C. / Hillside
- 52 Jonathan Spain LB 6-2 238 So. Greensboro, N.C. / Page
- 53 Ty Alt OL 6-2 271 Fr. Sewickley, Pa. / Greensburg Central Catholic
- 54 Jared Lennon LB 6-1 198 Fr. Carrboro, N.C. / Carrboro
- 55 Odell Benton LB 6-0 205 So. Jacksonville, N.C. / Richlands
- 56 Mike Warren DL 6-4 236 Fr. Jacksonville, N.C. / White Oak
- 57 Haris Cesko OL 6-4 269 Fr. Grayson, Ga. / Grayson
- 58 Will Nork LB 6-2 195 Fr. Charlotte, N.C. / First Assembly Christian
- 59 Jordan Jones DL 6-1 245 Jr. Lakeland, Fla. / Lakeland
- 60 Dustin Ruff DL 5-11 276 So. Waxhaw, N.C. / Parkwood
- 61 Brian Gerwig OL 6-1 309 So. Winston-Salem, N.C. / Trinity Collegiate (S.C.)
- 62 Kyle Herbert OL 6-1 291 Sr. Hillsborough, N.C. / Cardinal Gibbons
- 64 Anthony Cammarata OL 6-4 245 Fr. Asheville, N.C. / Asheville
- 64 Kyle Einwaechter DL 6-1 310 Fr. Bethesda, Md. / Walt Whitman
- 66 John Libretti OL 6-4 273 Fr. Cold Spring Harbor, N.Y. / Cold Spring Harbor
- 67 Matt Arnholt LS 6-1 198 Fr. Miami, Fla. / Gulliver Prep
- 68 Jack Williams OL 5-11 269 Fr. Avondale Estates, Ga. / Woodward Academy
- 69 Gordon Acha OL 6-3 263 Fr. Duxbury, Mass. / Duxbury
- 70 Clay Johnson OL 6-2 271 Jr. Hickory, N.C. / Hickory
- 71 Austin Sowell OL 6-4 274 So. Knoxville, Tenn. / Knoxville West
- 72 Dennis Wagner OL 6-3 294 Jr. Fredericksburg, Va. / Chancellor
- 73 Tyler Drake DL 6-1 215 Fr. Annapolis, Md. / Broadneck
- 74 Sean McCoy OL 6-1 264 Fr. Leesburg, Va. / Stone Bridge
- 76 Thomas McGuire OL 6-3 255 R-Fr. Ames, Iowa / Gilbert
- 77 Jacob Ingle OL 6-1 286 Fr. Burlington, N.C. / Williams
- 78 Gavin Billings OL 6-5 267 Jr. Kannapolis, N.C. / Northwest Cabarrus
- 79 Justin Ward OL 6-4 307 Sr. Summerfield, N.C. / Rockingham County
- 80 Alex Moore WR 6-0 184 Fr. Chapel Hill, N.C. / East Chapel Hill
- 81 Justin Osborne WR 5-8 159 Fr. Jacksonville, Fla. / First Coast
- 82 Doug Warrick TE 6-5 215 Fr. Hamilton, N.J. / Cheshire Academy
- 83 Chris Harris TE 6-4 242 Sr. Ocean View, N.J. / Ocean City
- 84 Kenton Beal P/K 5-11 187 Jr. Cape Coral, Fla. / Cape Coral
- 86 David Lowrey WR 6-0 164 Fr. Maitland, Fla. / Orangewood Christian
- 87 Brice Wordsworth TE 6-4 225 So. Rocky Mount, N.C. / Rocky Mount Academy
- 88 Jesse Tate TE 6-1 229 Fr. Toms River, N.J. / Toms River North
- 90 Olufemi Lamikanra DL 6-1 245 Sr. Tallahassee, Fla. / Lawton Chiles
- 91 Gary Coates DL 6-2 230 So. Irmo, S.C. / Dutch Fork
- 92 Gray Eller TE 6-2 205 Fr. Winston-Salem, N.C. / R.J. Reynolds
- 92 Chris Smith K 6-0 190 Fr. Darien, Conn. / Darien
- 93 Rob Sullivan DL 6-4 225 R-Fr. Scottsdale, Ariz. / Notre Dame Prep
- 94 Zach Duprey TE 6-1 220 Fr. Stanardsville, Va. / William Monroe
- 94 Spencer Linquist K/P 5-10 185 So. Newton, N.C. / Lenoir-Rhyne Univ.
- 95 Michael Pearson DL 6-1 277 So. Laurens, S.C. / Laurens
- 96 Lawson Hodges K 5-9 168 So. Thomasville, N.C. / Thomasville
- 98 Chris Jones DL 6-2 274 Fr. Fayetteville, N.C. / Douglas Byrd
- 99 Jay Brown DL 6-4 247 Jr. Sandy Springs, Ga. / Riverwood

== Statistics ==
- TEAM STATISTICS ELON /OPPONENTS
- SCORING 250 /326
- Points Per Game 25.00 /32.60
- FIRST DOWNS 198 /185
- Rushing 48 /114
- Passing 135 /57
- Penalty 15 /14
- RUSHING YARDAGE 853 /2361
- Yards gained rushing 1215 /2622
- Yards lost rushing 362 /261
- Rushing Attempts 334 /434
- Average Per Rush 2.6 /5.4
- Average Per Game 85.3 /236.1
- TDs Rushing 4 /26
- PASSING YARDAGE 2981 /1477
- Att-Comp-Int 378-246-10 /214-114-8
- Average Per Pass 7.89 /6.90
- Average Per Catch 12.12 /12.96
- Average Per Game 298.10 /147.70
- TDs Passing 25 /15
- TOTAL OFFENSE 3834 /3838
- Total Plays 712 /648
- Average Per Play 5.4 /5.9
- Average Per Game 383.4 /383.8
- KICK RETURNS: #-Yards 37-759 /43-834
- PUNT RETURNS: #-Yards 17-136 /20-349
- INT RETURNS: #-Yards 8-88 /10-100
- KICK RETURN AVERAGE 20.51 /19.40
- PUNT RETURN AVERAGE 8.00 /17.45
- INT RETURN AVERAGE 11.00 /10.00
- TEAM STATISTICS ELON /OPPONENTS
- FUMBLES-LOST 19-12 /16-10
- PENALTIES-Yards 48-435 /63-508
- Average Per Game 43.50 /50.80
- PUNTS-Yards 48-1859 /51-1940
- Average Per Game 38.73 /38.04
- Net punt average 31.46 /31.20
- TIME OF POSSESSION 05:18:35 /04:41:25
- Average Per Game 31:52 /28:08
- 3RD-DOWN Conversions 56-152 /51-133
- 3rd Down Percentage 36.84% /38.35 %
- 4TH-DOWN Conversions 6-16 /8-11
- 4th-Down Percentage 37.50% /72.73 %
- SACKS BY-Yards 14-86 /28-147
- MISC YARDS 0 /5
- TOUCHDOWNS SCORED 29 /43
- FIELD GOALS-ATTEMPTS 15-20 /9-16
- ON-SIDE KICKS 0-1 /0-0
- RED-ZONE SCORES 31-42 /30-39

== Coaches ==
- Jason Swepson Head Football Coach
- Chris Pincince Assistant Football Coach (Offensive Coordinator/Running Backs/Quarterbacks
- Ed Pinkham Assistant Football Coach (Defensive Coordinator)
- Scott Browne Assistant Football Coach (Recruiting Coordinator/Special Teams Coordinator)
- Ron Mattes Assistant Football Coach (Offensive Line)
- Kevin Downing Assistant Football Coach (Wide Receivers)
- Bobby Blick Assistant Football Coach (Tight Ends)
- Jerrick Hall Assistant Football Coach (Defensive Line)
- Freddie Aughtry-Lindsay Assistant Football Coach (Linebackers)
- Dan O'Brien Assistant Football Coach (Defensive Backs)
- Eric Estes Director of Football Operations
- Mitch Rippy Volunteer Assistant Coach
- Kenny Simpson Athletic Facilities and Equipment Manager
- Brett Davis Athletics Video Coordinator
