= 2012 Samford Bulldogs football team =

American college football season

2012 Samford Bulldogs football
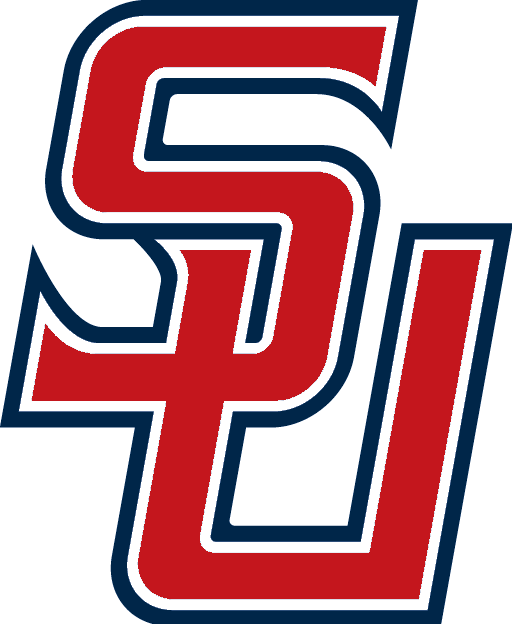
- Conference: Southern Conference
- Record: 7–4 (5–3 SoCon)
- Head coach: Pat Sullivan (6th season)
- Offensive coordinator: Travis Trickett / Brandon Herring
- Defensive coordinator: Bill D'Ottavio
- Home stadium: Seibert Stadium

2012 Southern Conference football standings
	Conf.			Overall
Team	W		L	W		L
No. 6 Georgia Southern +^	6	–	2	10	–	4
No. 9 Wofford +^	6	–	2	9	–	4
No. 7 Appalachian State +^	6	–	2	8	–	4
The Citadel	5	–	3	7	–	4
Samford	5	–	3	7	–	4
Chattanooga	5	–	3	6	–	5
Furman	2	–	6	3	–	8
Elon	1	–	7	3	–	8
Western Carolina	0	–	8	1	–	10
+ – Conference co-champions; ^ – FCS playoff participant; Rankings from The Sports Network Poll

The 2012 Samford Bulldogs football team represented Samford University in the 2012 NCAA Division I FCS football season. They were led by sixth year head coach Pat Sullivan and played their home games at Seibert Stadium. They are a member of the Southern Conference. They finished the season 7–4, 5–3 in SoCon play to finish in a three way tie for fourth place.

== Schedule ==
Date	Time	Opponent	Rank	Site	TV	Result	Attendance
September 1	3:30 pm	Furman		Seibert Stadium; Homewood, AL	CSS	W 24–21	6,712
September 8	7:00 pm	West Alabama*		Seibert Stadium; Homewood, AL		W 34–6	7,384
September 15	2:00 pm	at Gardner–Webb*		Ernest W. Spangler Stadium; Boiling Springs, NC		W 44–23	3,850
September 22	2:30 pm	at Western Carolina		E.J. Whitmire Stadium; Cullowhee, NC		W 25–21	10,112
September 29	5:00 pm	at No. 10 Georgia Southern		Paulson Stadium; Statesboro, GA	ESPN3	L 16–35	20,832
October 6	2:00 pm	No. 19 The Citadel		Seibert Stadium; Homewood, AL		W 38–7	5,872
October 13	2:00 pm	No. 13 Appalachian State^{†}	No. 25	Seibert Stadium; Homewood, AL		L 25–28	9,712
October 20	5:00 pm	at Chattanooga		Finley Stadium; Chattanooga, TN		L 13–20	7,103
November 3	2:00 pm	No. 6 Wofford		Seibert Stadium; Homewood, AL		W 24–17	8,147
November 10	12:30 pm	at Elon		Rhodes Stadium; Elon, NC		W 26–15	6,231
November 17	7:30 pm	at Kentucky*		Commonwealth Stadium; Lexington, KY	CSS	L 3–34	46,749
*Non-conference game; ^{†}Homecoming; Rankings from The Sports Network Poll released prior to the game; All times are in Central time

== Ranking movements ==
Ranking movements Legend: ██ Increase in ranking ██ Decrease in ranking — = Not ranked RV = Received votes
	Week																
Poll	Pre	1	2	3	4	5	6	7	8	9	10	11	12	13	14	15	Final
Sports Network	RV	RV	—	RV	RV	RV	25										
Coaches	—	—	RV	RV	25	RV	RV										
