= Conway High School (South Carolina) =

Location
- 2301 Church Street; Conway, South Carolina 29526; United States; 33°51′5″N 79°4′36″W

Information
- School type: Public high school
- Established: 1968 (58 years ago)
- School district: Horry County Schools
- CEEB code: 410555
- Principal: Jimmy Bailey
- Teaching staff: 97.00 (on an FTE basis)
- Grades: 9−12
- Enrollment: 1,724 (2024–2025)
- Student to teacher ratio: 17.77
- Colors: Forest green and gold
- Mascot: Tigers
- Feeder schools: Conway Middle; Whittemore Middle; Conway Elementary; Homewood Elementary; Kingston Elementary; Pee Dee Elementary; South Conway Elementary (part)
- Website: www.horrycountyschools.net/Conway_High_School

Conway High School is a public school located in Conway, South Carolina at 2301 Church Street. It is one of nine high schools in the Horry County School District. The school colors are forest green and gold, and its athletic teams are known as the "Tigers."

== Notable alumni ==
- Gunner Britton, American football player
- Bryan Edwards, former American football player
- Kenneth Earl "Junior" Hemingway, Jr., former American football player
- Terrell H. "Tonka" Hemingway, American football player
- Grant Holmes, American baseball player
- Jaylen Moody, American football & CFL player
- Raiqwon O'Neal, American football player
- Allen Patrick, former American football player
- Luke Rankin, S.C. State Senator
- Sheri Reynolds, playwright, author
- Perry Richardson, musician, bassist for FireHouse; Stryper
- Buddy Sasser, former American football player, coach, college athletics administrator
- Will Smith, University of Miami and Coastal Carolina baseball player
