= Steve Satterfield =

American football player and coach (1937–2023)

Biographical details
- Born: October 3, 1937
- Died: February 18, 2023 (aged 85)

Playing career
- 1956–1959: South Carolina
- Position: Quarterback

Coaching career (HC unless noted)
- 1960–1963: Sumter HS (SC)
- 1964: Wade Hampton HS (SC)
- 1965–1970: Sumter HS (SC)
- 1971–1973: Clemson (assistant)
- 1974–1976: Wofford

Head coaching record
- Overall: 18–14–1 (college)

Steven Mack Satterfield (October 3, 1937 – February 18, 2023) was an American football coach and player. He served as the head football coach at Wofford College from 1974 until his retirement in 1976, compiling a record of 18–14–1. As a college football player, he was the starting quarterback at the University of South Carolina in 1959.

Satterfield died on February 18, 2023, at the age of 85.
