= Mike Ayers =

American football player and coach (born 1948)

Biographical details
- Born: May 26, 1948 (age 78); Georgetown, Kentucky, U.S.

Playing career
- ?: Georgetown (KY)
- Positions: Linebacker, offensive tackle

Coaching career (HC unless noted)
- 1974: Georgetown (KY) (assistant)
- 1975: Georgetown (KY) (DC)
- 1976–1978: Newberry (assistant)
- 1979: Richmond (assistant)
- 1980–1982: Wofford (assistant)
- 1983–1984: East Tennessee State (DC)
- 1985–1987: East Tennessee State
- 1988–2017: Wofford

Head coaching record
- Overall: 218–160–2
- Tournaments: 8–8 (NCAA I-AA/FCS playoffs); 0–2 (NCAA D-II playoffs)

Accomplishments and honors

Championships
- 5 SoCon (2003, 2007, 2010, 2012, 2017)

Awards
- Eddie Robinson Award (2003); 5× SoCon Coach of the Year (2000, 2002–2003, 2007, 2010)

Mike Ayers (born May 26, 1948) is an American former college football coach. He served as the head football coach at East Tennessee State University from 1985 to 1987 and Wofford College in Spartanburg, South Carolina from 1988 to 2017, compiling career head coaching record of 218–160–2. Ayers' Wofford Terriers won five Southern Conference title, in 2003, 2007, 2010, 2012, and 2017.

== Playing career ==
Ayers played linebacker and offensive tackle for the Tigers of Georgetown College. He also played for the baseball team and competed in gymnastics and wrestling.

== Coaching career ==
Ayers began his coaching career as a graduate assistant and defensive coordinator at Georgetown College in 1974 and 1975. He again performed the role of assistant during stops at Newberry College and the University of Richmond. In 1980, Ayers arrived at Wofford as defensive coordinator for the Terriers under head coach Buddy Sasser. Ayers followed Sasser to East Tennessee State University, where he resumed his role as defensive coordinator before taking over the head coaching position in 1985. Ayers was hired as the head coach of the Terriers in 1988 by athletic director Danny Morrison over a milkshake at Asheville's Biltmore Dairy Bar. Wofford moved up to NCAA Division I-AA in 1995 and joined the Southern Conference in 1997. Under Ayers, the Terriers claimed five Southern Conference football championships, in 2003, 2007, 2010, 2012, and 2017. Ayers won the Eddie Robinson Award, given to the most outstanding FCS head coach, in 2003 after guiding the Terriers to a 12–2 record.

Ayers announced his retirement from coaching on December 13, 2017, after his 30th season at Wofford. He is the longest-serving coach in Wofford history and has the most wins (207) in program history.

== Personal life ==
He holds a black belt in karate, and is an accomplished sketch artist and fly fisherman. After retiring from coaching, he enrolled in art classes at Wofford in 2018.

== Head coaching record ==
Year	Team	Overall	Conference	Standing	Bowl/playoffs	TSN^{#}
East Tennessee State Buccaneers (Southern Conference) (1985–1987)
1985	East Tennessee State	0–10–1	0–7	9th		
1986	East Tennessee State	6–5	4–3	4th		
1987	East Tennessee State	5–6	2–5	7th		
East Tennessee State:		11–21–1	6–15			
Wofford Terriers (NCAA Division II independent) (1988–1994)
1988	Wofford	5–5				
1989	Wofford	6–5				
1990	Wofford	9–3			L NCAA Division II First Round	
1991	Wofford	9–3			L NCAA Division II First Round	
1992	Wofford	6–5				
1993	Wofford	7–3–1				
1994	Wofford	5–6				
Wofford Terriers (NCAA Division I-AA independent) (1995–1996)
1995	Wofford	4–7				
1996	Wofford	6–5				
Wofford Terriers (Southern Conference) (1997–2017)
1997	Wofford	3–7	2–6	6th		
1998	Wofford	4–7	3–5	T–5th		
1999	Wofford	6–5	5–3	2nd		
2000	Wofford	7–4	5–3	3rd		23
2001	Wofford	4–7	3–5	5th		
2002	Wofford	9–3	6–2	T–2nd		14
2003	Wofford	12–2	8–0	1st	L NCAA Division I-AA Semifinal	3
2004	Wofford	8–3	4–3	T–2nd		18
2005	Wofford	6–5	3–4	T–4th		
2006	Wofford	7–4	5–2	3rd		23
2007	Wofford	9–4	5–2	T–1st	L NCAA Division I Quarterfinal	10
2008	Wofford	9–3	7–1	2nd	L NCAA Division I First Round	9
2009	Wofford	3–8	2–6	T–7th		
2010	Wofford	10–3	7–1	T–1st	L NCAA Division I Quarterfinal	6
2011	Wofford	8–4	6–2	T–2nd	L NCAA Division I Second Round	12
2012	Wofford	9–4	6–2	T–1st	L NCAA Division I Quarterfinal	9
2013	Wofford	5–6	4–4	T–4th		
2014	Wofford	6–5	4–3	4th		
2015	Wofford	5–6	3–4	T–4th		
2016	Wofford	10–4	6–2	T–2nd	L NCAA Division I Quarterfinal	9
2017	Wofford	10–3	7–1	1st	L NCAA Division I Quarterfinal	6
Wofford:		207–139–1	99–61			
Total:		218–160–2				
National championship Conference title Conference division title or championship game berth

== See also ==
- List of college football career coaching wins leaders
