= 1930 East Tennessee State Teachers football team =

American college football season

1930 East Tennessee State Teachers football
- Conference: Smoky Mountain Conference
- Record: 0–7 (0–4 Smoky Mountain)
- Head coach: Jack S. Batey (1st season)
- Captain: Alex Kennedy

1930 Smoky Mountain Conference football standings
	Conf.					Overall
Team	W		L		T	W		L		T
Maryville (TN) $	2	–	0	–	0	5	–	4	–	0
Lincoln Memorial	2	–	0	–	0	4	–	6	–	0
King	3	–	1	–	0	6	–	2	–	1
Carson–Newman	3	–	2	–	0	5	–	4	–	0
Milligan	1	–	2	–	1	4	–	4	–	1
Tusculum	1	–	3	–	1	2	–	5	–	1
East Tennessee State Teachers	0	–	4	–	0	0	–	7	–	0
$ – Conference champion

The 1930 East Tennessee State Teachers football team was an American football team that East Tennessee State Teacher's College, Johnson City—now known as East Tennessee State University (ETSU)—as a member of the Smoky Mountain Conference in the 1930 college football season. They were led by first-year head coach Jack S. Batey, who was a graduate of Middle Tennessee State Normal School (B.S.) and University of Tennessee (M.S.). He coached football and basketball for two years and baseball for six years and taught physical education and agriculture from 1930 to 1935 at the school. East Tennessee Teachers finished the season with an 0–7 record and did score in six of the contests.

== Schedule ==
Date	Opponent	Site	Result	Source
October 11	Hiwassee*	Johnson City, TN	L 0–5	
October 18	Carson–Newman	Johnson City, TN	L 0–38	
October 25	at Lincoln Memorial	Middlesboro, KY	L 0–20	
November 1	Union (KY)*	Johnson City, TN	L 0–12	
November 11	Tusculum	Johnson City, TN	L 13–31	
November 17	at King	Tenneva Field; Bristol, TN	L 0–36	
November 22	Tennessee Tech*		L 0–19	
*Non-conference game
