= Saser =

Saser or SASER may refer to:

- Saser Muztagh, a mountain range in the Ladakh region of India
  - Saser Kangri, the highest peak of the range
  - Sasser Pass, or Saser Pass, a mountain pass at the northern end of the range
- SMS Tuanku Munawir, a secondary school in Seremban, Negeri Sembilan, Malaysia
- Sound amplification by stimulated emission of radiation

== See also ==
- Sasser (disambiguation)
