= 2012 Wofford Terriers football team =

American college football season

2012 Wofford Terriers football

SoCon co-champion

FCS Playoffs quarterfinal, L 7–14 vs. North Dakota State
- Conference: Southern Conference

Ranking
- Sports Network: No. 9
- FCS Coaches: No. 9
- Record: 9–4 (6–2 SoCon)
- Head coach: Mike Ayers (25th season)
- Offensive coordinator: Wade Long
- Defensive coordinator: Nate Woody
- Home stadium: Gibbs Stadium

2012 Southern Conference football standings
	Conf.			Overall
Team	W		L	W		L
No. 6 Georgia Southern +^	6	–	2	10	–	4
No. 9 Wofford +^	6	–	2	9	–	4
No. 7 Appalachian State +^	6	–	2	8	–	4
The Citadel	5	–	3	7	–	4
Samford	5	–	3	7	–	4
Chattanooga	5	–	3	6	–	5
Furman	2	–	6	3	–	8
Elon	1	–	7	3	–	8
Western Carolina	0	–	8	1	–	10
+ – Conference co-champions; ^ – FCS playoff participant; Rankings from The Sports Network Poll

The 2012 Wofford Terriers football team represented Wofford College in the 2012 NCAA Division I FCS football season. They were led by a 25th year head coach Mike Ayers and played their home games at Gibbs Stadium. They were a member of the Southern Conference (SoCon). They finished the season 9–4, 6–2 in SoCon play to claim a share of the conference championship with Appalachian State and Georgia Southern. They received an at-large bid into the FCS Playoffs where they defeated New Hampshire in the second round before falling in the quarterfinals to North Dakota State.

== Schedule ==
Date	Time	Opponent	Rank	Site	TV	Result	Attendance	Source
September 1	6:00 pm	at Gardner–Webb*	No. 10	Ernest W. Spangler Stadium; Boiling Springs, NC		W 34–7	3,140	
September 8	7:00 pm	Lincoln*	No. 10	Gibbs Stadium; Spartanburg, SC		W 82–0	4,309	
September 15	7:00 pm	Western Carolina	No. 9	Gibbs Stadium; Spartanburg, SC		W 49–20	8,544	
September 29	1:30 pm	at Elon	No. 6	Rhodes Stadium; Elon, NC		W 49–24	10,302	
October 6	1:30 pm	Furman	No. 6	Gibbs Stadium; Spartanburg, SC		W 20–17	9,170	
October 13	6:00 pm	at No. 7 Georgia Southern	No. 5	Paulson Stadium; Statesboro, GA		L 9–17	20,983	
October 20	3:30 pm	at No. 13 Appalachian State	No. 8	Kidd Brewer Stadium; Boone, NC		W 38–28	27,115	
October 27	1:30 pm	The Citadel	No. 7	Gibbs Stadium; Spartanburg, SC	ESPN3	W 24–21	9,658	
November 3	3:00 pm	at Samford	No. 6	Seibert Stadium; Homewood, AL		L 17–24	8,147	
November 10	1:30 pm	Chattanooga	No. 13	Gibbs Stadium; Spartanburg, SC		W 16–13 ^{OT}	8,112	
November 17	1:00 pm	at No. 12 (FBS) South Carolina*	No. 9	Williams-Brice Stadium; Columbia, SC	PPV	L 7–24	79,982	
December 1	2:00 pm	No. 11 New Hampshire*	No. 9	Gibbs Stadium; Spartanburg, SC (NCAA Division I Second Round)	ESPN3	W 23–7	6,346	
December 8	2:00 pm	No. 1 North Dakota State*	No. 9	Fargodome; Fargo, ND (NCAA Division I Quarterfinal)	ESPN3	L 7–14	18,267	
*Non-conference game; Rankings from The Sports Network Poll released prior to the game; All times are in Eastern time

== Ranking movements ==
Ranking movements Legend: ██ Increase in ranking ██ Decrease in ranking
	Week																
Poll	Pre	1	2	3	4	5	6	7	8	9	10	11	12	13	14	15	Final
Sports Network	10	10	9	7	6	6	5	8	7	6	13	9	9				
Coaches	13	13	9	6	5	5	4	9	8	7	14	9	9				
