= 2012 Appalachian State Mountaineers football team =

American college football season

2012 Appalachian State Mountaineers football

SoCon co-champion

NCAA Division I Second Round, L 37–38 ^{OT} vs. Illinois State
- Conference: Southern Conference

Ranking
- Sports Network: No. 7
- FCS Coaches: No. 6
- Record: 8–4 (6–2 SoCon)
- Head coach: Jerry Moore (24th season)
- Offensive coordinator: Scott Satterfield (1st season)
- Offensive scheme: Spread option
- Defensive coordinator: Dale Jones (3rd season)
- Base defense: 3–4
- Home stadium: Kidd Brewer Stadium

2012 Southern Conference football standings
	Conf.			Overall
Team	W		L	W		L
No. 6 Georgia Southern +^	6	–	2	10	–	4
No. 9 Wofford +^	6	–	2	9	–	4
No. 7 Appalachian State +^	6	–	2	8	–	4
The Citadel	5	–	3	7	–	4
Samford	5	–	3	7	–	4
Chattanooga	5	–	3	6	–	5
Furman	2	–	6	3	–	8
Elon	1	–	7	3	–	8
Western Carolina	0	–	8	1	–	10
+ – Conference co-champions; ^ – FCS playoff participant; Rankings from The Sports Network poll

The 2012 Appalachian State Mountaineers football team represented Appalachian State University in the 2012 NCAA Division I FCS football season. They were led by 24th-year head coach Jerry Moore and played their home games at Kidd Brewer Stadium. They were a member of the Southern Conference. They finished the season 8–4, 6–2 in SoCon play, tied for second in the conference. However, they did not share the championship with Georgia Southern and Wofford. They received an at–large bid to the FCS playoffs where they lost in the first round to Illinois State in what would turn out to be the school's last postseason game as an FCS program, as the Mountaineers will move to FBS and the Sun Belt Conference in 2014.

== Schedule ==
Date	Time	Opponent	Rank	Site	TV	Result	Attendance
September 1	Noon	at East Carolina*	No. 6	Dowdy–Ficklen Stadium; Greenville, NC	FSN	L 13–35	49,023
September 8	6:30 p.m.	No. 12 Montana*	No. 11	Kidd Brewer Stadium; Boone, NC	ESPN3	W 35–27	30,856
September 15	3:30 p.m.	No. 21 The Citadel	No. 8	Kidd Brewer Stadium; Boone, NC		L 28–52	24,137
September 22	6:00 p.m.	at Chattanooga	No. 17	Finley Stadium; Chattanooga, TN		W 34–17	13,726
September 29	3:30 p.m.	Coastal Carolina*	No. 17	Kidd Brewer Stadium; Boone, NC		W 55–14	27,619
October 6	3:30 p.m.	Elon†	No. 15	Kidd Brewer Stadium; Boone, NC		W 35–23	29,073
October 13	3:00 p.m.	at No. 25 Samford	No. 13	Seibert Stadium; Homewood, AL		W 28–25	9,712
October 20	3:30 p.m.	No. 8 Wofford	No. 13	Kidd Brewer Stadium; Boone, NC		L 28–38	27,115
October 27	3:30 p.m.	at Western Carolina	No. 16	E.J Whitmire Stadium; Cullowhee, NC (Battle for the Old Mountain Jug)		W 38–27	13,279
November 3	2:00 p.m.	at No. 2 Georgia Southern	No. 15	Paulson Stadium; Statesboro, GA (rivalry)	ESPN3	W 31–28	22,155
November 10	3:30 p.m.	Furman	No. 12	Kidd Brewer Stadium; Boone, NC		W 33–28	28,946
December 1	2:00 p.m.	No. 16 Illinois State*	No. 7	Kidd Brewer Stadium; Boone, NC (NCAA Division I Second Round)	ESPN3	L 37–38 ^{OT}	16,716
*Non-conference game; Rankings from The Sports Network Poll released prior to the game; All times are in Eastern time

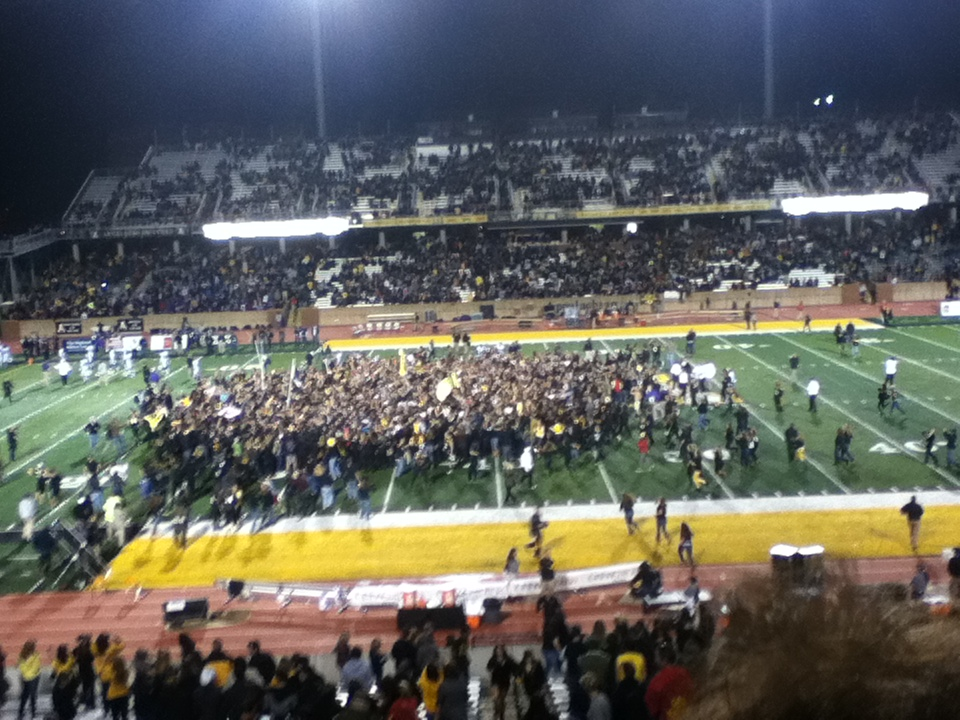
Fans storm Kidd Brewer Stadium after defeating the Furman Paladins and securing a share of the Southern Conference football championship

== Ranking movements ==
Ranking movements Legend: ██ Increase in ranking ██ Decrease in ranking
	Week																
Poll	Pre	1	2	3	4	5	6	7	8	9	10	11	12	13	14	15	Final
Sports Network	6	11	8	17	17	15	13	13	16	15	12	8	7				
Coaches	5	8	7	18	16	14	12	11	15	14	12	8	6				
