= Jack S. Batey =

American football player and coach (1900–1983)

Jack Batey
Biographical details
- Born: 1900
- Died: August 17, 1983 (aged 82–83); Nashville, Tennessee, U.S.

Playing career

Football
- 1924: Tennessee

Basketball
- 1923–1925: Tennessee
- Position: End (football)

Coaching career (HC unless noted)

Football
- 1930–1931: East Tennessee State

Head coaching record
- Overall: 1–11–2

Jackson Smith Batey Jr. (1900 – August 8, 1983) was an American football player and coach. He served as the head football coach at East Tennessee State University from 1930 to 1931 going 1–11–2.

Batey was a collegiate athlete at the University of Tennessee, lettering in football and basketball.

== Head coaching record ==
Year	Team	Overall	Conference	Standing	Bowl/playoffs
East Tennessee Teachers (Smoky Mountain Conference) (1930–1931)
1930	East Tennessee Teachers	0–7	0–4	7th	
1931	East Tennessee Teachers	1–4–2	0–1–2	7th	
East Tennessee Teachers:		1–11–2	0–5–2		
Total:		1–11–2			
