= Sasser Cup =

- Awarded for: the top athletic program in the Big South Conference
- Presented by: Big South Conference
- First award: 1986 to Winthrop
- Currently held by: High Point University

The George F. "Buddy" Sasser Cup Trophy (usually just called the Sasser Cup) is a trophy awarded annually to the top athletic program in the Big South Conference. Formally called The Commissioner's Cup, it was renamed The Sasser Cup after former commissioner Buddy Sasser.

== History ==
Annual Sasser Cup champions

- 1985–86: Winthrop
- 1986–87: Winthrop
- 1987–88: Coastal Carolina
- 1988–89: Coastal Carolina
- 1989–90: Coastal Carolina
- 1990–91: Coastal Carolina
- 1991–92: Campbell
- 1992–93: Campbell
- 1993–94: Campbell
- 1994–95: UNC Greensboro
- 1995–96: UNC Greensboro
- 1996–97: UNC Greensboro
- 1997–98: Liberty
- 1998–99: Liberty
- 1999–00: Liberty
- 2000–01: Coastal Carolina
- 2001–02: Liberty
- 2002–03: Liberty
- 2003–04: Coastal Carolina
- 2004–05: Coastal Carolina
- 2005–06: Coastal Carolina
- 2006–07: Coastal Carolina
- 2007–08: Liberty
- 2008–09: Liberty
- 2009–10: Liberty
- 2010–11: Liberty
- 2011–12: Liberty
- 2012–13: Liberty
- 2013–14: Coastal Carolina
- 2014–15: Coastal Carolina
- 2015–16: Liberty
- 2016-17: Liberty
- 2017-18: Liberty
- 2018-19: Campbell
- 2019-20: None Awarded (Covid-19)
- 2020-21: Campbell
- 2021-22: High Point University
- 2022-23: High Point University
- 2023-24: High Point University
