= Colin Anderson (American football) =

American football player (born 1989)

Profile
- Position: Tight end

Personal information
- Born: November 21, 1989 (age 36); Gaithersburg, Maryland
- Listed height: 6 ft 4 in (1.93 m)
- Listed weight: 240 lb (109 kg)

Career information
- College: Furman
- NFL draft: 2013: undrafted

Career history
- Minnesota Vikings (2013)*; New York Jets (2014)*
- * Offseason or practice squad member only

Career NFL statistics
- Receptions: --
- Receiving yards: --
- Receiving Touchdowns: --

Colin Tyler Anderson (born November 21, 1989) is an American former professional football player who was a tight end in the National Football League (NFL). He was signed by the Minnesota Vikings as an undrafted free agent in 2013, and later played for the New York Jets. He played college football at Furman.

== Professional career ==
=== 2013 NFL Pro Day ===
Pre-draft measurables
Height	Weight	40-yard dash	10-yard split	20-yard split	20-yard shuttle	Three-cone drill	Vertical jump	Broad jump	Bench press
6 ft 4 in (1.93 m)	234 lb (106 kg)	4.82 s	1.76 s	2.86 s	4.32 s	6.85 s	36.5 in (0.93 m)	9 ft 6 in (2.90 m)	17 reps
Stats from nfldraftscout.com

=== Minnesota Vikings ===
On April 30, 2013, Anderson signed with the Minnesota Vikings as an undrafted free agent following the conclusion of the 2013 NFL draft. On August 31, 2013, he was released before the start of the regular season.

=== New York Jets ===
On December 31, 2013, Anderson signed a future/reserve contract with the New York Jets. He was released on August 24, 2014.
