= Ben Dupree =

American football player (born 1992)

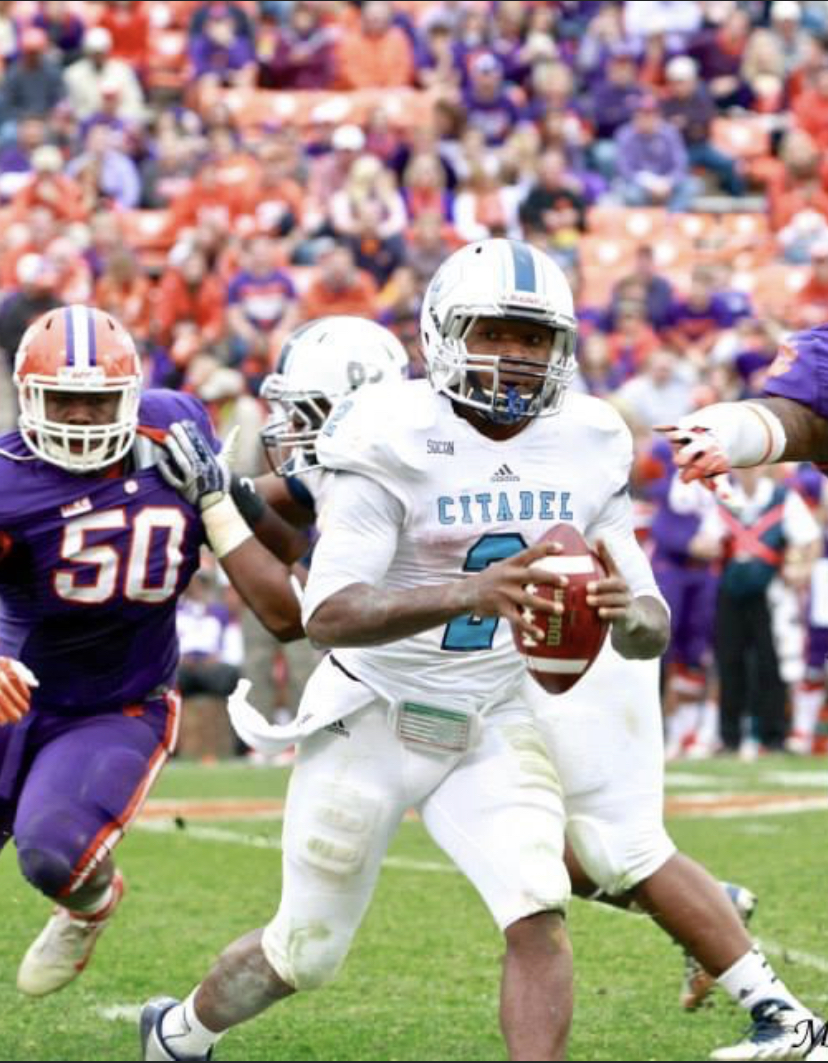
- Standing at 5'8", Dupree was the shortest quarterback in all of NCAA Division I college football during his collegiate career.

No. 2, 3, 24
- Positions: Quarterback, Running back

Personal information
- Born: January 29, 1992 (age 34); Philadelphia, Pennsylvania, U.S.
- Listed height: 5 ft 8 in (1.73 m)
- Listed weight: 185 lb (84 kg)

Career information
- High school: Susquehanna Township High School
- College: The Citadel
- NFL draft: 2014: undrafted

Career history
- Panasonic Impulse (2015–2016)

Benjamin Quran Dupree (born January 29, 1992) is an American football player who played for the Panasonic Impulse in Japan's X-League. Dupree played college football for NCAA Division I FCS' Citadel Bulldogs after being awarded Pennsylvania Class AAA player of the year as a senior in high school at Susquehanna Township. Standing at only 5'8", Dupree was the shortest quarterback in all of NCAA Division I college football during his time at Citadel.

== Early life ==
Ben Dupree was born in Philadelphia but moved to Harrisburg, Pennsylvania, at a young age. He was a 2010 graduate of Susquehanna Township High School, where he totaled more than 3,700 rushing yards and 4,800 passing yards while accounting for 80 touchdowns in his high school career. He sits just above Terrelle Pryor in the Pennsylvania PIAA football records book for quarterback career total yards, with over 8,500. Following his senior season, he was named first team all-state and the Pennsylvania state player of the year. He also starred in basketball and scored over 1,000 points in his career. Dupree played on 2009 football team which, won a school-record 12 games, and 2007–08 basketball squad which finished 32–3, won districts, and reached the state championship game.

== College career ==
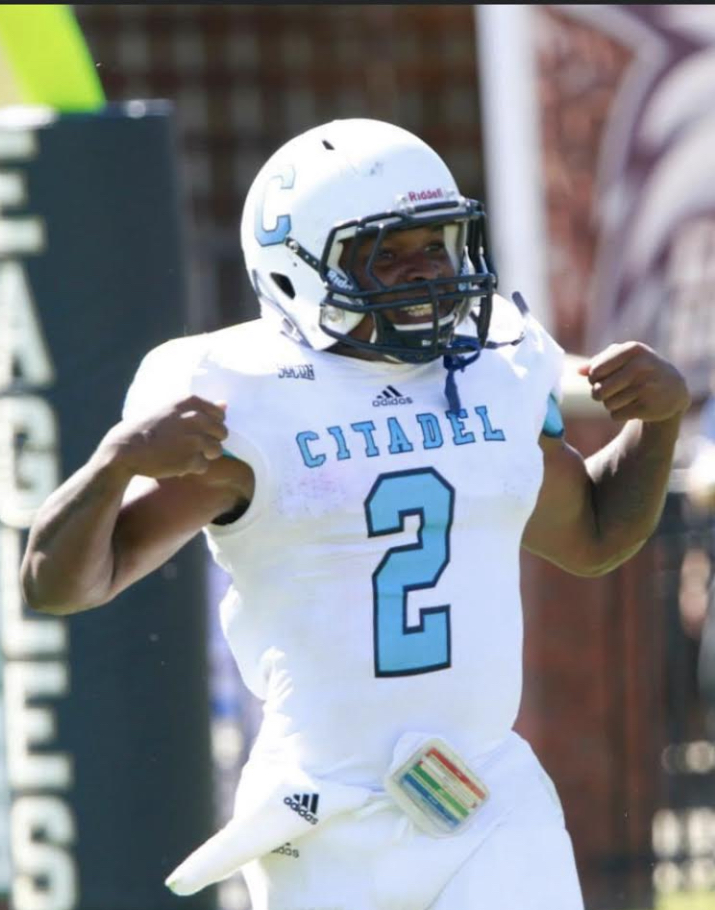
Dupree celebrates Touchdown vs Georgia Southern

Dupree was recruited to The Citadel, which is located in Charleston, SC by head coach Kevin Higgins. He was recruited as a triple option quarterback, but during his freshman season Dupree played slotback and quarterback. He started three games at Quarterback and went 2–1. This earned him the starting QB position for the rest of his college career. His sophomore season did not go well and the team finished 4–7. Dupree's junior year was the best season for The Citadel since 1992. The team finished 7–4 with wins over, FBS schools, Appalachian State and Georgia Southern. Dupree earned Southern Conference player of the week vs Appalachian State, accounting for 180 rushing yards, 2TDS and going 2 for 4 for 56 Passing Yards. Dupree's senior season statistically was better than his junior season but the team only finished 5–7. Dupree rushed for over 1,000 yards and led the Southern Conference with 18 rushing TDs. This included a school record, 5 rushing touchdown performance vs FBS opponent Old Dominion. Over the course of his collegiate career, Dupree was named Southern Conference player of the week three times and the Southern Conference freshman of the week once.

== X-League ==
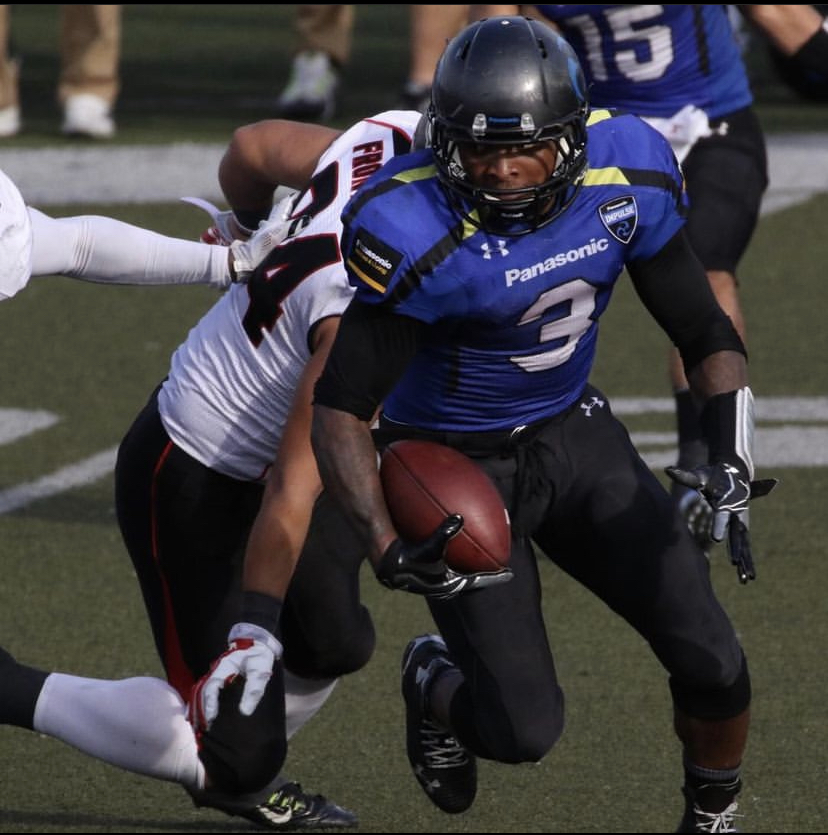
Dupree with Panasonic Impulse

In 2015, Dupree signed a contract to play in Japan's professional American football league named the X-League. He signed to Panasonic Impulse where they converted him from a triple option QB to a running back. During his rookie season, Dupree was voted to the 2015 All X-League Team and led the Panasonic Impulse to the X-League Championship, where they defeated the Fujitsu Frontiers in the Tokyo Dome. The Panasonic Impulse then went on to win the Rice Bowl in front of 31,000 fans.
