= 2012 Georgia Southern Eagles football team =

American college football season

2012 Georgia Southern Eagles football

SoCon co-champion

FCS Playoffs Semifinals, L 20–23 vs. North Dakota State
- Conference: Southern Conference

Ranking
- Sports Network: No. 6
- FCS Coaches: No. 7
- Record: 10–4 (6–2 SoCon)
- Head coach: Jeff Monken (3rd season)
- Offensive coordinator: Brent Davis (3rd season)
- Offensive scheme: Triple option
- Defensive coordinator: Jack Curtis (2nd season)
- Base defense: 4–3
- Home stadium: Paulson Stadium

2012 Southern Conference football standings
| | Conf. | | | Overall |
| Team | W | | L | W | | L |
|---|---|---|---|---|---|---|
| No. 6 Georgia Southern +^ | 6 | – | 2 | 10 | – | 4 |
| No. 9 Wofford +^ | 6 | – | 2 | 9 | – | 4 |
| No. 7 Appalachian State +^ | 6 | – | 2 | 8 | – | 4 |
| The Citadel | 5 | – | 3 | 7 | – | 4 |
| Samford | 5 | – | 3 | 7 | – | 4 |
| Chattanooga | 5 | – | 3 | 6 | – | 5 |
| Furman | 2 | – | 6 | 3 | – | 8 |
| Elon | 1 | – | 7 | 3 | – | 8 |
| Western Carolina | 0 | – | 8 | 1 | – | 10 |
+ – Conference co-champions; ^ – FCS playoff participant; Rankings from The Sports Network Poll

The 2012 Georgia Southern Eagles football team represented Georgia Southern University in the 2012 NCAA Division I FCS football season. They were led by third-year head coach Jeff Monken and played their home games at Paulson Stadium. They were a member of the Southern Conference. They finished the season 10–4, 6–2 in SoCon play to claim a share of the conference championship with Appalachian State and Wofford. They received the SoCon's automatic bid into the FCS Playoffs where they defeated Central Arkansas in the second round and Old Dominion in the quarterfinals before falling to North Dakota State in the semifinals. That would turn out to be Georgia Southern's final FCS playoff game, as they announced they were moving to FBS and the Sun Belt Conference in 2014.

== Schedule ==
| Date | Time | Opponent | Rank | Site | TV | Result | Attendance | Source |
|---|---|---|---|---|---|---|---|---|
| September 1 | 6:00 pm | Jacksonville* | No. 3 | Paulson Stadium; Statesboro, GA | | W 58–0 | 20,132 | |
| September 8 | 6:00 pm | at The Citadel | No. 3 | Johnson Hagood Stadium; Charleston, SC | | L 21–23 | 12,299 | |
| September 22 | 6:00 pm | Elon | No. 11 | Paulson Stadium; Statesboro, GA | | W 26–23 | 18,353 | |
| September 29 | 6:00 pm | Samford | No. 10 | Paulson Stadium; Statesboro, GA | ESPN3 | W 35–16 | 20,832 | |
| October 6 | 3:30 pm | at Western Carolina | No. 8 | Bob Waters Field at E. J. Whitmire Stadium; Cullowhee, NC | | W 45–13 | 9,514 | |
| October 13 | 6:00 pm | No. 5 Wofford | No. 7 | Paulson Stadium; Statesboro, GA | | W 17–9 | 20,983 | |
| October 20 | 1:30 pm | at Furman | No. 3 | Paladin Stadium; Greenville, SC | | W 37–17 | 11,191 | |
| October 27 | 6:00 pm | at Chattanooga | No. 2 | Finley Stadium; Chattanooga, TN | | W 39–31 ^{3OT} | 8,908 | |
| November 3 | 2:00 pm | No. 15 Appalachian State | No. 2 | Paulson Stadium; Statesboro, GA (rivalry) | ESPN3 | L 28–31 | 22,155 | |
| November 10 | 2:00 pm | Howard* | No. 7 | Paulson Stadium; Statesboro, GA | | W 69–26 | 18,069 | |
| November 17 | 1:30 pm | at No. 5 (FBS) Georgia* | No. 6 | Sanford Stadium; Athens, GA | ESPN3 | L 14–45 | 92,746 | |
| December 1 | 2:00 pm | No. 8 Central Arkansas* | No. 6 | Paulson Stadium; Statesboro, GA (NCAA Division I Second Round) | ESPN3 | W 24–16 | 8,888 | |
| December 8 | 12:00 pm | at No. 3 Old Dominion* | No. 6 | Foreman Field; Norfolk, VA (NCAA Division I Quarterfinal) | ESPN | W 49–35 | 20,068 | |
| December 14 | 8:00 pm | at No. 1 North Dakota State* | No. 6 | Fargodome; Fargo, ND (NCAA Division I Semifinal) | ESPN2 | L 20–23 | 18,484 | |
*Non-conference game; Rankings from The Sports Network Poll released prior to the game; All times are in Eastern time

== Ranking movements ==
Ranking movements Legend: ██ Increase in ranking ██ Decrease in ranking
| | Week | | | | | | | | | | | | | | | | |
| Poll | Pre | 1 | 2 | 3 | 4 | 5 | 6 | 7 | 8 | 9 | 10 | 11 | 12 | 13 | 14 | 15 | Final |
|---|---|---|---|---|---|---|---|---|---|---|---|---|---|---|---|---|---|
| Sports Network | 3 | 3 | 11 | 11 | 10 | 8 | 7 | 3 | 2 | 2 | 7 | 6 | 6 | | | | |
| Coaches | 3 | 3 | 10 | 10 | 9 | 8 | 7 | 3 | 2 | 1 | 7 | 6 | 7 | | | | |
