= Buddy Sasser =

Biographical details
- Born: Conway, South Carolina, U.S.

Playing career
- 1955–1956: North Carolina

Coaching career (HC unless noted)
- 1963–1970: Conway HS (SC)
- 1972–1976: Appalachian State (assistant)
- 1977–1982: Wofford
- 1983–1984: East Tennessee State

Administrative career (AD unless noted)
- 1963–1970: Conway HS (SC)
- 1972–1977: Appalachian State (assistant AD)
- 1977–1982: Wofford
- 1985–1986: East Tennessee State
- 1986–1989: Coastal Carolina
- 1989–1996: Big South (commissioner)
- 1996–1999: Coastal Carolina

Head coaching record
- Overall: 45–39–3 (college); 66–17–5 (high school)

George F. "Buddy" Sasser is an American former football coach and athletics administrator. As commissioner of the Big South Conference between 1989 and 1996, Sasser was responsible for increasing membership, gaining automatic bids to the NCAA basketball tournament and adding basketball television exposure for the conference.

== Biography ==
Born in Conway, South Carolina, Sasser played college football for the University of North Carolina Tarheels earning two letters, the last in 1956. Sasser served as athletic director and head football coach at Conway High School from 1963 to 1970, leading the Tigers to a 66–17–5 record. He was assistant football coach and assistant athletic director at Appalachian State University from 1972 until 1977, and was athletic director and head football coach from 1977 until 1982 at Wofford College. He served as Coastal Carolina University's athletic director from 1986 until 1989 and again from 1996 until 1999.

== Honors and awards ==
In 1982, Sasser was named Kodak Coach of the Year for the college division. He was inducted, along with three other Coastal Carolina University athletic administrators and student athletes, in the inaugural class of the Big South Conference Hall of Fame.

Each year, the George F. "Buddy" Sasser Cup Trophy (named for him in 2000) is awarded to the Big South member institution that has the most successful year in athletics. Coastal Carolina University's Athletic Hall of Fame was named in honor of Sasser on June 4, 2003.

== Head coaching record ==
=== College ===
Year	Team	Overall	Conference	Standing	Bowl/playoffs
Wofford Terriers (NAIA Division I independent) (1977–1982)
1977	Wofford	7–3–1			
1978	Wofford	3–8			
1979	Wofford	5–5			
1980	Wofford	7–2–2			
1981	Wofford	6–5			
1982	Wofford	8–3			
Wofford:		36–26–3			
East Tennessee State Buccaneers (Southern Conference) (1983–1984)
1983	East Tennessee State	3–8	1–6	T–7th	
1984	East Tennessee State	6–5	2–4	T–5th	
East Tennessee State:		9–13	3–10		
Total:		45–39–3			
