= 2012 Big Sky Conference football season =

- League: NCAA Division I FCS (Football Championship Subdivision)
- Sport: Football
- Duration: August 30, 2012 through November 2012
- Teams: 13
- TV partner(s): ESPN Inc., Root Sports

Regular Season

Football seasons
- 2011 2013

2012 Big Sky Conference football standings
	Conf.			Overall
Team	W		L	W		L
No. 4 Eastern Washington +^	7	–	1	11	–	3
No. 5 Montana State +^	7	–	1	11	–	2
No. 12 Cal Poly +^	7	–	1	9	–	3
No. 20 Northern Arizona	6	–	2	8	–	3
Sacramento State	4	–	4	6	–	5
Northern Colorado	4	–	4	5	–	6
Southern Utah	4	–	4	5	–	6
North Dakota	3	–	5	5	–	6
Montana	3	–	5	5	–	6
UC Davis	3	–	5	4	–	7
Portland State	2	–	6	3	–	8
Weber State	2	–	6	2	–	9
Idaho State	0	–	8	1	–	10
$ – Conference champion; ^ – FCS playoff participant; Rankings from The Sports Network poll

The 2012 Big Sky Conference football season was the 49th season for the Big Sky. The conference began its season on Thursday, August 30, as each of the conference's teams began their respective 2012 season of NCAA Division I Football Championship Subdivision competition.

This was the first Big Sky season for four new conference members—full members North Dakota and Southern Utah, and football-only members Cal Poly and UC Davis. All four had previously played in the Great West Conference.

Eastern Washington, Montana State, and Cal Poly represented the Big Sky in the 2012 playoffs. Eastern Washington was eliminated in the semifinals, and Montana State was eliminated in the quarterfinals.

== Rankings ==
		Pre	Wk 1	Wk 2	Wk 3	Wk 4	Wk 5	Wk 6	Wk 7	Wk 8	Wk 9	Wk 10	Wk 11	Wk 12	Final
Cal Poly	AP	RV	RV	RV	RV	23	20	15	14	11	16	19	17	12	12
Cal Poly	C	RV	RV	RV	RV	23	19	14	12	11					11
Eastern Washington	AP	12	9	10	9	7	7	6	1	1	7	5	5	4	4
Eastern Washington	C	15	11	11	9	7	7	6	1	1					4
Idaho State	AP	RV	RV												
Idaho State	C	RV													
Montana	AP	11	12	14	14	21	RV	RV							
Montana	C	10	9	12	11	20	RV	RV	RV						
Montana State	AP	4	4	3	2	2	2	2	5	4	3	2	2	2	5
Montana State	C	4	4	3	2	2	2	2	5	4					5
North Dakota	AP	RV	RV	RV	RV	RV	RV	RV							
North Dakota	C	RV	RV	RV	RV	RV	RV								
Northern Arizona	AP	RV	RV	RV	RV	22	18	16	16	13	12	11	15	20	20
Northern Arizona	C	RV		RV	RV	RV	21	18	18	12					20
Northern Colorado	AP														
Northern Colorado	C														
Portland State	AP	RV	RV												
Portland State	C	RV	RV												
Sacramento State	AP	RV		RV	RV	RV	RV	RV							
Sacramento State	C		RV	RV				RV	RV						
Southern Utah	AP	RV	RV	RV	RV	RV	RV								
Southern Utah	C														
UC Davis	AP		RV					RV							
UC Davis	C														
Weber State	AP														
Weber State	C														

Legend
	Improvement in ranking
	Drop in ranking
	Not ranked previous week
	No change in ranking from previous week
RV	Received votes but were not ranked in Top 25 of poll

== Schedule ==
=== Week 1 ===
Date	Time	Visiting team	Home team	Site	TV	Result	Attendance	Ref.
August 30	4:15 PM	Northern Colorado	Utah	Rice-Eccles Stadium • Salt Lake City	Pac-12	L 0–41	45,273	
August 30	5:00 PM	South Dakota Mines	North Dakota	Alerus Center • Grand Forks, North Dakota		W 66–0	8,847	
August 30	5:00 PM	Sacramento State	New Mexico State	Aggie Memorial Stadium • Las Cruces, New Mexico		L 19–49	12,118	
August 30	5:00 PM	Southern Utah	Utah State	Romney Stadium • Logan, Utah		L 3-34	17,009	
August 30	6:00 PM	Eastern Washington	Idaho	Kibbie Dome • Moscow, Idaho		W 20-3	11,136	
August 30	6:00 PM	Azusa Pacific	UC Davis	Aggie Stadium • Davis, California		W 41-3	5,903	
August 30	6:05 PM	Chadron State	Montana State	Bobcat Stadium • Bozeman, Montana		W 33-6	20,767	
August 30	7:30 PM	Northern Arizona	Arizona State	Sun Devil Stadium • Tempe, Arizona	Pac-12	L 6-63	48,658	
September 1	11:00 AM	Idaho State	Air Force	Falcon Stadium • Colorado Springs, Colorado		L 21–49	35,282	
September 1	12:30 PM	South Dakota	Montana	Washington–Grizzly Stadium • Missoula, Montana		W 35–24	25,126	
September 1	4:05 PM	San Diego	Cal Poly	Alex G. Spanos Stadium • San Luis Obispo, California		W 41–14	6,022	
September 1	5:05 PM	Carroll College	Portland State	Jeld-Wen Field • Portland, Oregon		W 38-20	6,845	
September 1	7:00 PM	Weber State	Fresno State	Bulldog Stadium • Fresno, California		L 10-37	27,663	
^{#}Rankings from AP Poll released prior to game. All times are in Pacific Time.

=== Week 2 ===
Date	Time	Visiting team	Home team	Site	TV	Result	Attendance	Ref.
September 8	12:00 PM	Southern Utah	California	Memorial Stadium • Berkeley, California	Pac-12	L 31-50	57,745	
September 8	12:00 PM	Sacramento State	Colorado	Folsom Field • Boulder, Colorado		W 30-28	46,843	
September 8	12:00 PM	Weber State	BYU	LaVell Edwards Stadium • Provo, Utah		L 13-45	60,314	
September 8	12:00 PM	Eastern Washington	Washington State	Martin Stadium • Pullman, Washington	Pac-12	L 20-24	33,598	
September 8	12:35 PM	Colorado Mesa	Northern Colorado	Nottingham Field • Greeley, Colorado		W 40-3	5,136	
September 8	3:05 PM	Black Hills State	Idaho State	Holt Arena • Pocatello, Idaho		W 38-5	6,228	
September 8	3:35 PM	Montana	Appalachian State	Kidd Brewer Stadium • Boone, North Carolina	GamePlan	L 27-35	30,856	
September 8	4:00 PM	Portland State	North Dakota	Alerus Center • Grand Forks, North Dakota		UND 45-37	-	
September 8	4:00 PM	Montana State	Drake	Drake Stadium • Des Moines, Iowa		W 34-24	3,558	
September 8	4:00 PM	UC Davis	San Jose State	Spartan Stadium • San Jose, California		L 13-45	7,462	
September 8	4:05 PM	Northern Arizona	UNLV	Sam Boyd Stadium • Las Vegas, Nevada		W 17-14	15,257	
^{#}Rankings from AP Poll released prior to game. All times are in Pacific Time.

=== Week 3 ===
Date	Time	Visiting team	Home team	Site	TV	Result	Attendance	Ref.
September 15	12:00 PM	UC Davis	South Dakota State	Coughlin-Alumni Stadium • Brookings, South Dakota		L 8-12	11,532	
September 15	12:30 PM	Liberty University	Montana	Washington–Grizzly Stadium • Missoula, Montana		W 34-14	24,991	
September 15	12:35 PM	Stephen F. Austin State	Montana State	Bobcat Stadium • Bozeman, Montana		W 43-35	17,147	
September 15	1:00 PM	Portland State	Washington	CenturyLink Field • Seattle	Fox	L 13-52	54,922	
September 15	2:05 PM	Northern Colorado	Sacramento State	Hornet Stadium • Sacramento, California		CSUS 28-17	-	
September 15	3:00 PM	Cal Poly	Wyoming	War Memorial Stadium • Laramie, Wyoming		W 24-22	21,728	
September 15	4:05 PM	Fort Lewis College	Northern Arizona	Walkup Skydome • Flagstaff, Arizona		W 69-0	6,594	
September 15	5:00 PM	North Dakota	San Diego State	Qualcomm Stadium • San Diego		L 41-49	24,826	
September 15	5:00 PM	New Mexico Highlands	Southern Utah	Eccles Coliseum • Cedar City, Utah		W 45-23	7,835	
September 15	5:00 PM	McNeese State	Weber State	Stewart Stadium • Ogden, Utah		W 21-35	9,617	
^{#}Rankings from AP Poll released prior to game. All times are in Pacific Time.

=== Week 4 ===
Date	Time	Visiting team	Home team	Site	TV	Result	Attendance	Ref.
September 22	12:30 PM	Northern Arizona	Montana	Washington–Grizzly Stadium • Missoula, Montana		NAU 41-31	25,254	
September 22	12:30 PM	Idaho State	No. 25 Nebraska	Memorial Stadium • Lincoln, Nebraska	BTN	L 7-73	84,923	
September 22†	1:05 PM	Northern Colorado	Montana State	Bobcat Stadium • Bozeman, Montana		MTST 41-16	18,637	
September 22	5:00 PM	Eastern Washington	Weber State	Stewart Stadium • Ogden, Utah		EWU 32-26	9,434	
September 22	5:05 PM	Southern Utah	Portland State	Jeld-Wen Field • Portland, Oregon		SUU 49-42	-	
September 22	6:05 PM	UC Davis	Cal Poly	Alex G. Spanos Stadium • San Louis Obispo, California		CP 28-20	11,075	
September 22	6:05 PM	North Dakota	Sacramento State	Hornet Stadium • Sacramento, California		UND 35-13	-	
^{#}Rankings from AP Poll released prior to game. All times are in Pacific Time.

=== Week 5 ===
Date	Time	Visiting team	Home team	Site	TV	Result	Attendance	Ref.
September 29	12:30 PM	Montana State	Southern Utah	Eccles Coliseum • Cedar City, Utah		MTST 24-17	8,417	
September 29	12:35 PM	Sacramento State	Idaho State	Holt Arena • Pocatello, Idaho		CSUS 54-31	7,882	
September 29	2:05 PM	Portland State	Northern Arizona	Walkup Skydome • Flagstaff, Arizona		NAU 24-10	9,107	
September 29	4:00 PM	Cal Poly	North Dakota	Alerus Center • Grand Forks, North Dakota		CP 35-17	-	
September 29	4:15 PM	Montana	Eastern Washington	Roos Field • Cheney, Washington		EWU 32-26	10,529	
September 29	6:00 PM	Weber State	UC Davis	Aggie Stadium • Davis, California		UCD 37-13	-	
^{#}Rankings from AP Poll released prior to game. All times are in Pacific Time.

=== Week 6 ===
Date	Time	Visiting team	Home team	Site	TV	Result	Attendance	Ref.
October 5	5:00 PM	Cal Poly	Weber State	Stewart Stadium • Ogden, Utah		CP 45-23	5,939	
October 6	12:00 PM	Sacramento State	Southern Utah	Eccles Coliseum • Cedar City, Utah		CSUS 27-22	3,766	
October 6†	12:35 PM	Montana	Northern Colorado	Nottingham Field • Greeley, Colorado		MONT 40-17	4,751	
October 6	4:00 PM	Montana State	UC Davis	Aggie Stadium • Davis, California		MTST 48-41	9,877	
October 6	5:05 PM	North Dakota	Eastern Washington	Roos Field • Cheney, Washington		EWU 55-17	8,646	
October 6	5:05 PM	Idaho State	Portland State	Jeld-Wen Field • Portland, Oregon		PRST 77-10	5,754	
^{#}Rankings from AP Poll released prior to game. All times are in Pacific Time.

=== Week 7 ===
Date	Time	Visiting team	Home team	Site	TV	Result	Attendance	Ref.
October 13	12:30 PM	Southern Utah	Montana	Washington–Grizzly Stadium • Missoula, Montana		SUU 30-20	25,684	
October 13	12:35 PM	Eastern Washington	Montana State	Bobcat Stadium • Bozeman, Montana		EWU 27-24	20,477	
October 13	1:00 PM	Northern Arizona	North Dakota	Alerus Center • Grand Forks, North Dakota		NAU 45-38	9,742	
October 13	3:05 PM	UC Davis	Idaho State	Holt Arena • Pocatello, Idaho		UCD 52-45	5,212	
October 13	9:05 PM	Northern Colorado	Cal Poly	Alex G. Spanos Stadium • San Luis Obispo CA		CP 56-28	9,382	
October 13	6:05 PM	Weber State	Sacramento State	Hornet Stadium • Sacramento, California		CSUS 19-14	12,106	
^{#}Rankings from AP Poll released prior to game. All times are in Pacific Time.

=== Week 8 ===
Date	Time	Visiting team	Home team	Site	TV	Result	Attendance	Ref.
October 20	12:00 PM	Weber State	Southern Utah	Eccles Coliseum • Cedar City, Utah		WEB 24-22	3,811	
October 20	12:30 PM	Montana	North Dakota	Alerus Stadium • Grand Forks, North Dakota		UND 40-34	9,000	
October 20	12:35 PM	Idaho State	Northern Colorado	Nottingham Field • Greeley, Colorado		UNCO 52-14	4,155	
October 20†	4:05 PM	Sacramento State	Eastern Washington	Roos Field • Cheney, Washington		EWU 31-28	8,714	
October 20	4:05 PM	UC Davis	Northern Arizona	Walkup Skydome • Flagstaff, Arizona		NAU 21-7	7,991	
October 20	6:05 PM	Portland State	Cal Poly	Alex G. Spanos Stadium • San Louis Obispo, California		CP 37-25	10,025	
^{#}Rankings from AP Poll released prior to game. All times are in Pacific Time.

=== Week 9 ===
Date	Time	Visiting team	Home team	Site	TV	Result	Attendance	Ref.
October 27	12:00 PM	Eastern Washington	Southern Utah	Eccles Coliseum • Cedar City, Utah		SUU 30-27	3,344	
October 27	12:30 PM	Idaho State	Montana	Washington–Grizzly Stadium • Missoula, Montana		MONT 70-24	24,152	
October 27	12:35 PM	Northern Arizona	Northern Colorado	Nottingham Field • Greeley, Colorado		NAU 12-10	3,780	
October 27	1:05 PM	North Dakota	Montana State	Bobcat Stadium • Bozeman, Montana		MTST 55-10	17,137	
October 27	2:00 PM	Portland State	UC Davis	Aggie Stadium • Davis, California		PRST 49-21	7,826	
October 27	6:05 PM	Cal Poly	Sacramento State	Hornet Stadium • Sacramento, California		CSUS 35-29	8,113	
^{#}Rankings from AP Poll released prior to game. All times are in Pacific Time.

== Homecoming games ==
September 22

- Northern Colorado @ Montana State

October 6

- Montana @ Northern Colorado

October 20

- Sacramento State @ Eastern Washington

== Attendance ==
Team	Stadium	Capacity	Game 1	Game 2	Game 3	Game 4	Game 5	Game 6	Game 7	Game 8	Total	Average	% of Capacity
Cal Poly	Alex G. Spanos Stadium	11,075	6,022	11,075	9,382	10,025	6,326				42,830	8,566	77.3%
Eastern Washington	Roos Field	8,600	10,529	8,646	8,714	8,644	6,011				42,544	8,509	98.9%
Idaho State	Holt Arena	12,000	6,228	7,882	5,212	5,144	5,125				29,591	5,918	49.3%
Montana	Washington–Grizzly Stadium	25,217	25,126	24,991	25,254	25,684	24,152	26,210			151,417	25,236	100%
Montana State	Bobcat Stadium	17,777	20,767	17,147	18,637	20,477	17,137	15,177			109,342	18,223	102.5%
North Dakota	Alerus Center	12,283	8,847	9,210	9,531	9,742	9,296	7,144			53,770	8,962	72.9%
Northern Arizona	Walkup Skydome	10,000	6,594	9,107	7,991	4,125	6,119				33,936	6,787	67.9%
Northern Colorado	Nottingham Field	8,500	5,136	4,751	4,155	3,780	3,418				21,240	4,248	49.9%
Portland State	JELD-WEN Field	18,627	6,845	6,353	5,754	5,077	5,758				24,710	4,942	27%
Sacramento State	Hornet Stadium	21,195	7,408	10,774	12,106	8,113	7,143				45,544	9,109	42.9%
Southern Utah	Eccles Coliseum	8,500	7,835	8,417	3,766	3,811	3,344				27,173	5,435	63.9%
UC Davis	Aggie Stadium	10,849	5,903	7,569	9,877	7,826	9,899				41,074	8,215	75.7%
Weber State	Stewart Stadium	17,500	9,617	9,434	5,939	7,251	4,837				37,078	7,416	42.4%

== Head coaches ==
- Tim Walsh, Cal Poly
- Beau Baldwin, Eastern Washington
- Mike Kramer, Idaho State
- Mick Delaney, Montana
- Rob Ash, Montana State
- Chris Mussman, North Dakota
- Jerome Souers, Northern Arizona
- Earnest Collins Jr., Northern Colorado
- Nigel Burton, Portland State
- Marshall Sperbeck, Sacramento State
- Ed Lamb, Southern Utah
- Bob Biggs, UC Davis
- Jody Sears, Weber State

== NFL draft ==
The following list includes all Big Sky players who were drafted in the 2013 NFL draft.

Round #	Pick #	NFL team	Player	Position	College
7	221	San Diego Chargers	Brad Sorensen	QB	Southern Utah
