= Mick Delaney =

American football coach (born 1942)

Biographical details
- Born: December 2, 1942 (age 83); Butte, Montana, U.S.
- Education: Western Montana College

Coaching career (HC unless noted)
- 1974–1977: Great Falls HS (MT)
- 1978–1980: Montana State (assistant)
- 1991–1992: Montana Western
- 1993–2007: Colorado State (RB)
- 2008: Montana (RB)
- 2009: Montana (assistant HC/RB)
- 2010–2011: Montana (associate HC/RB)
- 2012–2014: Montana

Administrative career (AD unless noted)
- 1983–1985: Montana Tech

Head coaching record
- Overall: 29–25–1 (college)
- Tournaments: 0–2 (NCAA D-I playoffs)

Michael Delaney (born December 2, 1942) is an American college football coach, and a former head coach at the University of Montana. Delaney was hired July 26, 2012, replacing former head coach Robin Pflugrad. Delaney is credited for coming out of retirement to help save the UM football program that was riveted with player off field scandals.

Delaney has had extensive coaching experience. He was the assistant head coach at Montana State University from 1976–1980, head coach and athletic director at the University of Montana Western from 1991–1992, and running backs coach at Colorado State University from 1993 until 2007.

== Coaching career ==
Delaney is originally from Butte, Montana. He began his coaching career at Butte Central High School (1964–1967), and then moved on to Great Falls High School (1969–1977), serving as head football coach the last four years.

He earned his B.A. in education at University of Montana Western in 1964. He is an inaugural inductee into the Western Montana College Sports Hall of Fame.

Prior to coaching the Rams, Delaney was the head coach at Western Montana in 1991 and 1992; was the athletic director at Montana Tech of the University of Montana (1983–85); and was an assistant football coach at Montana State (1978–80). He came to Montana from Colorado State where he was an assistant coach for former head coach Sonny Lubick for 15 seasons from 1993–2007.

Delaney was associate head coach at the University of Montana from 2008-2011. He became head coach in 2012. In 2013 he was a finalist for the Liberty Mutual Coach of the Year Award. He announced his retirement in 2014.

== Head coaching record ==
Year	Team	Overall	Conference	Standing	Bowl/playoffs	TSN^{#}	Coaches^{°}
Western Montana Bulldogs (Frontier Conference) (1991–1992)
1991	Western Montana	3–5	2–4	4th			
1992	Western Montana	2–6–1	2–4	T–3rd			
Western Montana:		5–11–1	4–8				
Montana Grizzlies (Big Sky Conference) (2012–2014)
2012	Montana	5–6	3–5	T–8th			
2013	Montana	10–3	6–2	3rd	L NCAA Division I Second Round	8	8
2014	Montana	9–5	6–2	T-2nd	L NCAA Division I Second Round	13	11
Montana:		24–14	15–9				
Total:		29–25–1					
