= Jerome Souers =

American football coach (born 1958)

Current position
- Title: Head coach
- Team: Montana State–Northern
- Conference: Frontier
- Record: 3–49

Biographical details
- Born: May 20, 1958 (age 68)
- Education: University of Oregon

Coaching career (HC unless noted)
- 1984: Western Washington (DC/DB)
- 1985: Portland State (RB)
- 1986–1989: Montana (DB)
- 1990–1997: Montana (DC/DB)
- 1998–2018: Northern Arizona
- 2020–2021: Southern Oregon (DC)
- 2022–present: Montana State–Northern

Head coaching record
- Overall: 126–163
- Tournaments: 1–5 (NCAA Division I FCS)

Accomplishments and honors

Championships
- 1 Big Sky (2003)

Awards
- Big Sky Coach of the Year (1999)

Jerome Souers (born May 20, 1958) is an American college football coach. He is the head football coach for Montana State University–Northern, a position he has held since 2022. He was formerly the head football coach at Northern Arizona University, a position he held from 1998 until 2018. Souers was selected as the 1999 Big Sky Conference Coach of the Year and was an Eddie Robinson Award finalist in 2003.

He was raised in Eugene, Oregon and attended North Eugene High School along with former NBA player and head coach Danny Ainge.

== Head coaching record ==
Year	Team	Overall	Conference	Standing	Bowl/playoffs	STATS^{#}	Coaches^{°}
Northern Arizona Lumberjacks (Big Sky Conference) (1998–2018)
1998	Northern Arizona	6–5	3–5	T–7th			
1999	Northern Arizona	4–8 (Note: Northern Arizona later forfeited four conference victories during the 1999 season because of the use of an inelligble player.)	2–6	T–7th	L NCAA Division I-AA First Round	16	19
2000	Northern Arizona	3–8	2–6	T–7th			
2001	Northern Arizona	8–4	5–2	2nd	L NCAA Division I-AA First Round	16	15
2002	Northern Arizona	6–5	3–4	T–4th			
2003	Northern Arizona	9–4	5–2	T–1st	L NCAA Division I-AA Quarterfinal	10	9
2004	Northern Arizona	4–7	3–4	5th			
2005	Northern Arizona	3–8	1–6	T–7th			
2006	Northern Arizona	6–5	5–3	4th			
2007	Northern Arizona	6–5	5–3	3rd			
2008	Northern Arizona	6–5	4–4	5th			
2009	Northern Arizona	5–6	4–4	T–5th			
2010	Northern Arizona	6–5	4–4	6th			
2011	Northern Arizona	4–7	3–5	6th			
2012	Northern Arizona	8–3	6–2	4th		20	15
2013	Northern Arizona	9–3	7–1	2nd	L NCAA Division I First Round	15	15
2014	Northern Arizona	7–5	5–3	T–5th			
2015	Northern Arizona	7–4	5–3	T–4th			
2016	Northern Arizona	5–6	4–4	T–6th			
2017	Northern Arizona	7–5	6–2	T–3rd	L NCAA Division I First Round	25	
2018	Northern Arizona	4–6	3–4	8th			
Northern Arizona:		123–114	85–77				
Montana State–Northern Lights (Frontier Conference) (2022–present)
2022	Montana State–Northern	0–10	0–10	8th			
2023	Montana State–Northern	1–9	0–8	9th			
2024	Montana State–Northern	1–9	1–7	9th			
2025	Montana State–Northern	1–10	0–6	7th (East)			
2026	Montana State–Northern	0–11	0–6	7th (East)			
Montana State–Northern:		3–49	1–37				
Total:		126–163					
National championship Conference title Conference division title or championship game berth
^{#}Rankings from final Sports Network poll.; ^{°}Rankings from final USA/ESPN poll.
