= Jody Sears =

American football player and coach (born 1967)

Biographical details
- Born: October 21, 1967 (age 59); Pullman, Washington, U.S.

Playing career
- 1987–1990: Washington State
- Position: Wide receiver

Coaching career (HC unless noted)
- 1994–1996: Iowa State (GA)
- 1998–1999: St. Ambrose (DC)
- 2000–2002: Army (CB)
- 2003: Eastern Washington (DC/LB)
- 2004–2006: Eastern Washington (DC/S)
- 2007: Eastern Washington (DC/DE)
- 2008–2010: Washington State (co-DC/CB)
- 2011: Washington State (CB)
- 2012: Weber State (interim HC/DC)
- 2013: Weber State
- 2014–2018: Sacramento State
- 2019–2020: Nevada (interim DC/LB)

Head coaching record
- Overall: 24–54

Jody Sears (born October 21, 1967) is an American college football coach and former player. He was the interim defensive coordinator for Nevada Wolf Pack. He previously served as the head coach at Weber State University from 2012 to 2013 and California State University, Sacramento from 2014 to 2018.

== Early life and playing career ==
Sears attended Pullman High School in his hometown of Pullman, Washington. He attended Washington State University, where he walked on to the Washington State Cougars football team as a wide receiver under head coach Mike Price.

== Coaching career ==
In 1994, Sears attended graduate school at Iowa State University, where he earned his master's degree. There he served as a graduate assistant coach for the Iowa State Cyclones football team, where he coached wide receivers and defensive backs.

In 1998, Sears became the defensive coordinator at St. Ambrose University. Following a two-year stint at St. Ambrose, he was an assistant coach for three years at the United States Military Academy, before heading to Eastern Washington University as a defensive coordinator.

Sears spent three years as the co-defensive coordinator for the Washington State Cougars. After head coach Paul Wulff was fired in late 2011, new Washington State head coach Mike Leach did not keep any of the Wulff staff.

On April 2, 2012, Sears joined new head coach John L. Smith as the defensive coordinator at Weber State University. A few weeks later, when Smith stepped down to become the head coach at the University of Arkansas, Sears was asked to become the interim head coach. During his two seasons as a head coach of Weber State, he compiled a record of 4–19 losses before being relieved of his duties.

In 2014, he was named head coach at California State University, Sacramento. In five years, he compiled an 20–35 record with two winning seasons. Their record in 2017 tied them for third in the Big Sky Conference standings, their best conference finish since 2010.

In 2019, Sears stepped in as defensive coordinator, on an interim basis, to coach the 2019 Nevada Wolf Pack football team in the 2020 Famous Idaho Potato Bowl (January) against Ohio.

== Head coaching record ==
Year	Team	Overall	Conference	Standing	Bowl/playoffs
Weber State Wildcats (Big Sky Conference) (2012–2013)
2012	Weber State	2–9	2–6	T–11th	
2013	Weber State	2–10	1–7	T–11th	
Weber State:		4–19	3–13		
Sacramento State Hornets (Big Sky Conference) (2014–2018)
2014	Sacramento State	7–5	4–4	7th	
2015	Sacramento State	2–9	1–7	T–12th	
2016	Sacramento State	2–9	2–6	T–9th	
2017	Sacramento State	7–4	6–2	T–3rd	
2018	Sacramento State	2–8	0–7	13th	
Sacramento State:		20–35	13–26		
Total:		24–54			
