= Ed Lamb =

American football player and coach (born 1974)

Current position
- Title: Head coach
- Team: Northern Colorado
- Conference: Big Sky
- Record: 5–30

Biographical details
- Born: March 4, 1974 (age 52); Castro Valley, California, U.S.

Playing career
- 1992–1993: Ricks
- 1994–1996: BYU
- Positions: Linebacker, defensive end

Coaching career (HC unless noted)
- 1997: Redlands (DL)
- 1998–2000: Redlands (DC)
- 2001: BYU (GA)
- 2002–2003: Idaho (DC)
- 2005–2007: San Diego (ST/DB)
- 2007: San Diego (ST/DB/RC)
- 2008–2015: Southern Utah
- 2016–2022: BYU (AHC/ST)
- 2023–present: Northern Colorado

Head coaching record
- Overall: 50–77
- Tournaments: 0–2 (NCAA D-I playoffs)

Accomplishments and honors

Championships
- 1 Great West (2010); 1 Big Sky (2015)

Claude Edward Lamb III (born March 4, 1974) is an American college football coach and former player. In December 2022, he was named as the football head coach at the University of Northern Colorado. Lamb served as the football head coach at Southern Utah University (SUU) from 2007 to 2015. From 2015 to 2022, he was the assistant head football coach at Brigham Young University (BYU). Lamb is an alumnus of BYU.

== Head coaching record ==
Year	Team	Overall	Conference	Standing	Bowl/playoffs	TSN/STATS^{#}	Coaches^{°}
Southern Utah Thunderbirds (Great West Conference) (2008–2011)
2008	Southern Utah	4–7	1–3	5th			
2009	Southern Utah	5–6	2–2	T–2nd			
2010	Southern Utah	6–5	4–0	1st			
2011	Southern Utah	6–5	1–3	T–4th			
Southern Utah Thunderbirds (Big Sky Conference) (2012–2015)
2012	Southern Utah	5–6	4–4	T–5th			
2013	Southern Utah	8–5	5–3	T–4th	L NCAA Division I First Round	21	24
2014	Southern Utah	3–9	3–5	T–8th			
2015	Southern Utah	8–4	7–1	1st	L NCAA Division I First Round	18	18
Southern Utah:		45–47	27–21				
Northern Colorado Bears (Big Sky Conference) (2023–present)
2023	Northern Colorado	0–11	0–8	12th			
2024	Northern Colorado	1–11	1–7	T–11th			
2025	Northern Colorado	4–8	2–6	T-8th			
Northern Colorado:		5–30	3–21				
Total:		50–77					
National championship Conference title Conference division title or championship game berth
