= Earnest Collins Jr. =

American football coach

Playing career
- 1991–1994: Northern Colorado
- Positions: Defensive back, punt returner

Coaching career (HC unless noted)
- 1996–1999: Northwest Missouri State (DB/AST)
- 2000–2003: Northern Colorado (DB/ST)
- 2003–2006: Kansas (DB/ST)
- 2007: UCF (DB/ST)
- 2008: Alcorn State (assoc. HC)
- 2009–2010: Alcorn State
- 2011–2019: Northern Colorado

Head coaching record
- Overall: 36–84

Earnest Collins Jr. is an American college football coach, most recently for the University of Northern Colorado, a position he held from 2011 to 2019. Collins also served as the head football coach at Alcorn State University for the 2009 and 2010 seasons. On April 6, 2021, Collins was announced as the head coach for Gateway High School.

== Head coaching record ==
Year	Team	Overall	Conference	Standing	Bowl/playoffs
Alcorn State Braves (Southwestern Athletic Conference) (2009–2010)
2009	Alcorn State	3–6	3–4	T–2nd (Eastern)	
2010	Alcorn State	5–6	4–5	3rd (Eastern)	
Alcorn State:		8–12	7–9		
Northern Colorado Bears (Big Sky Conference) (2011–2019)
2011	Northern Colorado	0–11	0–8	9th	
2012	Northern Colorado	5–6	4–4	T–5th	
2013	Northern Colorado	1–11	0–8	13th	
2014	Northern Colorado	3–8	2–6	T–10th	
2015	Northern Colorado	6–5	3–5	T–8th	
2016	Northern Colorado	6–5	4–4	T–6th	
2017	Northern Colorado	3–7	2–6	T–9th	
2018	Northern Colorado	2–9	2–6	11th	
2019	Northern Colorado	2–10	2–6	T–9th	
Northern Colorado:		28–72	19–53		
Total:		36–84			
