= 2012 University of North Dakota football team =

American college football season

2012 University of North Dakota football
- Conference: Big Sky Conference
- Record: 5–6 (3–5 Big Sky)
- Head coach: Chris Mussman (5th season)
- Offensive coordinator: Greg Breitbach
- Defensive coordinator: Mike Mannausau
- Home stadium: Alerus Center

2012 Big Sky Conference football standings
	Conf.			Overall
Team	W		L	W		L
No. 4 Eastern Washington +^	7	–	1	11	–	3
No. 5 Montana State +^	7	–	1	11	–	2
No. 12 Cal Poly +^	7	–	1	9	–	3
No. 20 Northern Arizona	6	–	2	8	–	3
Sacramento State	4	–	4	6	–	5
Northern Colorado	4	–	4	5	–	6
Southern Utah	4	–	4	5	–	6
North Dakota	3	–	5	5	–	6
Montana	3	–	5	5	–	6
UC Davis	3	–	5	4	–	7
Portland State	2	–	6	3	–	8
Weber State	2	–	6	2	–	9
Idaho State	0	–	8	1	–	10
$ – Conference champion; ^ – FCS playoff participant; Rankings from The Sports Network poll

The 2012 University of North Dakota football team represented the University of North Dakota in the 2012 NCAA Division I FCS football season. They were led by fifth-year head coach Chris Mussman and played their home games at the Alerus Center. This was their first year as a member of the Big Sky Conference.

This season North Dakota officially played without a mascot name after the decision to retire "Fighting Sioux" as the school's mascot amid controversy.

They finished the season 5–6, 3–5 in Big Sky play to finish in a three-way tie for eighth place.

== Schedule ==
Date	Time	Opponent	Site	TV	Result	Attendance
August 30	7:00 pm	South Dakota M&T*	Alerus Center; Grand Forks, ND	MSN/Big Sky TV	W 66–0	8,847
September 8	6:00 pm	Portland State*	Alerus Center; Grand Forks, ND	MSN/Big Sky TV	W 45–37	9,210
September 15	7:00 pm	at San Diego State*	Qualcomm Stadium; San Diego, CA	KUSI	L 41–49	24,826
September 22	8:00 pm	at Sacramento State	Hornet Stadium; Sacramento, CA	Big Sky TV	W 35–13	10,774
September 29	6:00 pm	No. 23 Cal Poly	Alerus Center; Grand Forks, ND	MSN/Big Sky TV	L 17–35	9,531
October 6	6:00 pm	at No. 7 Eastern Washington	Roos Field; Cheney, WA	SWX/Big Sky TV	L 17–55	8,646
October 13	3:00 pm	No. 16 Northern Arizona	Alerus Center; Grand Forks, ND	MSN/Big Sky TV	L 38–45	9,742
October 20	2:30 pm	Montana	Alerus Center; Grand Forks, ND	RTRM/RTNW	W 40–34	9,000
October 27	3:00 pm	at No. 4 Montana State	Bobcat Stadium; Bozeman, MT	Big Sky TV	L 10–55	17,137
November 3	1:00 pm	Southern Utah	Alerus Center; Grand Forks, ND	MSN/Big Sky TV	W 33–29	7,144
November 17	1:00 pm	at Northern Colorado	Nottingham Field; Greeley, CO	Big Sky TV	L 27–28	3,418
*Non-conference game; Rankings from The Sports Network Poll released prior to the game; All times are in Central time

Despite also being a member of the Big Sky Conference, the game with Portland State on September 8 was considered a non conference game and had no effect on the Big Sky Standings.

== Game summaries ==
=== South Dakota M&T ===
	1	2	3	4	Total
Hardrockers	0	0	0	0	0
North Dakota	14	31	7	14	66

=== Portland State ===
	1	2	3	4	Total
Vikings	9	15	0	13	37
North Dakota	14	21	10	0	45

=== @ San Diego State ===
	1	2	3	4	Total
North Dakota	14	6	7	14	41
Aztecs	21	14	7	7	49

=== @ Sacramento State ===
	1	2	3	4	Total
North Dakota	7	7	14	7	35
Hornets	7	0	0	6	13

=== Cal Poly ===
	1	2	3	4	Total
#23 Mustangs	14	0	0	21	35
North Dakota	0	7	3	7	17

=== @ Eastern Washington ===
	1	2	3	4	Total
North Dakota	10	7	0	0	17
#7 Eagles	20	14	14	7	55

=== Northern Arizona ===
	1	2	3	4	Total
#16 Lumberjacks	14	3	14	14	45
North Dakota	0	17	14	7	38

=== Montana ===
	1	2	3	4	Total
Grizzlies	7	10	17	0	34
North Dakota	17	14	0	9	40

=== @ Montana State ===
	1	2	3	4	Total
North Dakota	7	0	3	0	10
#4 Bobcats	14	14	7	20	55

=== Southern Utah ===
	1	2	3	4	Total
Thunderbirds	3	19	0	7	29
North Dakota	0	13	13	7	33

=== @ Northern Colorado ===
	1	2	3	4	Total
North Dakota	14	10	3	0	27
Bears	7	14	7	0	28
