= 2012 Weber State Wildcats football team =

American college football season

2012 Weber State Wildcats football
- Conference: Big Sky Conference
- Record: 2–9 (2–6 Big Sky)
- Head coach: Jody Sears (1st season)
- Offensive coordinator: Matt Hammer (6th season)
- Defensive coordinator: Jody Sears (1st season)
- Home stadium: Stewart Stadium

2012 Big Sky Conference football standings
	Conf.			Overall
Team	W		L	W		L
No. 4 Eastern Washington +^	7	–	1	11	–	3
No. 5 Montana State +^	7	–	1	11	–	2
No. 12 Cal Poly +^	7	–	1	9	–	3
No. 20 Northern Arizona	6	–	2	8	–	3
Sacramento State	4	–	4	6	–	5
Northern Colorado	4	–	4	5	–	6
Southern Utah	4	–	4	5	–	6
North Dakota	3	–	5	5	–	6
Montana	3	–	5	5	–	6
UC Davis	3	–	5	4	–	7
Portland State	2	–	6	3	–	8
Weber State	2	–	6	2	–	9
Idaho State	0	–	8	1	–	10
$ – Conference champion; ^ – FCS playoff participant; Rankings from The Sports Network poll

The 2012 Weber State Wildcats football team represented Weber State University in the 2012 NCAA Division I FCS football season. In December 2011, John L. Smith was hired to be the new head coach. That all changed on April 23, 2012. On April 23, John L. Smith was offered a one-year contract to be the new head coach of the Arkansas Razorbacks, so he left Weber State to take the position after being head coach for roughly 3 1/2 months. On April 26, Weber State announced that Jody Sears would serve as interim head coach for the 2012 season in addition to the defensive coordinator spot he was hired for earlier in April. Weber State played their home games at Stewart Stadium. They are a member of the Big Sky Conference. They finished the season 2–9, 2–6 in Big Sky play to finish in a tie for 11th place.

== Before the season ==
=== 2012 recruits ===
College recruiting (2012)
Name	Hometown	School	Height	Weight	Commit date
Hasan Ali; S	San Antonio, TX	Holy Cross	6 ft 0 in (1.83 m)	201 lb (91 kg)	
Hasan Ali; S	Recruit ratings: No ratings found				
Braden Corpus; QB	Boise, ID	Borah	6 ft 1 in (1.85 m)	203 lb (92 kg)	
Braden Corpus; QB	Recruit ratings: No ratings found				
Maxwell Curtis; OL	Meridian, ID	Mountain View	6 ft 5 in (1.96 m)	250 lb (110 kg)	
Maxwell Curtis; OL	Recruit ratings: No ratings found				
Cordero Dixon; CB	Gainesville, FL	Gainesville	5 ft 10 in (1.78 m)	185 lb (84 kg)	
Cordero Dixon; CB	Recruit ratings: No ratings found				
Duncan Farnsworth; OL	Lilburn, GA	Milton	6 ft 6 in (1.98 m)	285 lb (129 kg)	
Duncan Farnsworth; OL	Recruit ratings: No ratings found				
Gamal Fowler; WR	Dayton, TX	Dayton	5 ft 11 in (1.80 m)	175 lb (79 kg)	
Gamal Fowler; WR	Recruit ratings: No ratings found				
Siamani Harris; DE	Kearns, UT	Hunter	6 ft 3 in (1.91 m)	230 lb (100 kg)	
Siamani Harris; DE	Recruit ratings: No ratings found				
Joe Hawkins; OL	Vero Beach, FL	Vero Beach	6 ft 1 in (1.85 m)	300 lb (140 kg)	
Joe Hawkins; OL	Recruit ratings: No ratings found				
Marquel Holmes; LB	Ocala, FL	Trinity Catholic	6 ft 0 in (1.83 m)	213 lb (97 kg)	
Marquel Holmes; LB	Recruit ratings: No ratings found				
Breck Lewis; QB	Spanish Fork, UT	Spanish Fork	6 ft 1 in (1.85 m)	195 lb (88 kg)	
Breck Lewis; QB	Recruit ratings: No ratings found				
Yuvraaj Madra; OL	Mather, Sacramento County, CA	Folsom	6 ft 5 in (1.96 m)	270 lb (120 kg)	
Yuvraaj Madra; OL	Recruit ratings: No ratings found				
Davonte Maez; QB	West Valley City, UT	Hunter	6 ft 1 in (1.85 m)	165 lb (75 kg)	
Davonte Maez; QB	Recruit ratings: No ratings found				
Cody McKague; TE	Boise, ID	Borah	6 ft 4 in (1.93 m)	241 lb (109 kg)	
Cody McKague; TE	Recruit ratings: No ratings found				
Austin Mikkelson; Ol	St. George, UT	Pine View	6 ft 4 in (1.93 m)	297 lb (135 kg)	
Austin Mikkelson; Ol	Recruit ratings: No ratings found				
Shane Oliverson; DL	Hyde Park, UT	Preston	6 ft 4 in (1.93 m)	245 lb (111 kg)	
Shane Oliverson; DL	Recruit ratings: No ratings found				
Chris Wheeler; S	Templeton, CA	Allan Hancock; Templeton	6 ft 0 in (1.83 m)	175 lb (79 kg)	
Chris Wheeler; S	Recruit ratings: No ratings found				
AJ Wilcox; DE	Clearfield, UT	Syracuse (Utah)	6 ft 5 in (1.96 m)	235 lb (107 kg)	
AJ Wilcox; DE	Recruit ratings: No ratings found				
Cameon Young; OL	Cove, TX	Barbers Hill	6 ft 3 in (1.91 m)	299 lb (136 kg)	
Cameon Young; OL	Recruit ratings: No ratings found				
Overall recruit ranking:
Note: In many cases, Scout, Rivals, 247Sports, On3, and ESPN may conflict in their listings of height and weight.; In these cases, the average was taken. ESPN grades are on a 100-point scale.; Sources: "2012 Player Commitments – Weber State Wildcats". ESPN.; "2012 Team Ranking". Rivals.com.

=== Spring Game ===
The Weber State Purple and White 2012 Spring game was held on April 13, 2012. The match featured the Weber offense against the Weber defense. The game would start 20 minutes late due to a lightning delay. Once the lightning ended though, it was the defense that struck down Weber offense. The defense picked Weber's QB's four times, two coming from redshirt freshman Roman Venezuela. The offense would score four touchdowns against Weber's D over roughly 110-plays, but it was the defense that controlled the game according to the coaches.

== Schedule ==
Date	Time	Opponent	Site	TV	Result	Attendance
September 1	8:00 pm	at Fresno State*	Bulldog Stadium; Fresno, CA	CBS ULive	L 10–37	27,663
September 8	1:00 pm	at BYU*	LaVell Edwards Stadium; Provo, UT	BYUtv	L 13–45	60,314
September 15	6:00 pm	No. 19 McNeese State*	Stewart Stadium; Ogden, UT	Big Sky TV	L 21–35	9,617
September 22	6:00 pm	No. 9 Eastern Washington	Stewart Stadium; Ogden, UT	Big Sky TV	L 26–32	9,434
September 29	7:00 pm	at UC Davis	Aggie Stadium; Davis, CA	Big Sky TV	L 13–37	7,569
October 5	6:00 pm	No. 20 Cal Poly	Stewart Stadium; Ogden, UT	Big Sky TV	L 23–45	5,939
October 13	7:00 pm	at Sacramento State	Hornet Stadium; Sacramento, CA	Big Sky TV	L 14–19	12,106
October 20	1:00 pm	at Southern Utah	Eccles Coliseum; Cedar City, UT	Big Sky TV	W 24–22	3,811
November 3	1:30 pm	Montana	Stewart Stadium; Ogden, UT	RTUT	L 21–24	7,251
November 10	1:30 pm	Northern Colorado	Stewart Stadium; Ogden, UT	Big Sky TV	L 34–42	4,837
November 17	4:00 pm	at Idaho State	Holt Arena; Pocatello, ID	Big Sky TV	W 40–14	5,125
*Non-conference game; Rankings from The Sports Network Poll released prior to the game; All times are in Mountain time

== Game summaries ==
=== Fresno State ===
Weber State at Fresno State

Team	1	2	3	4	Total
Wildcats	0	3	7	0	10
• Bulldogs	14	10	0	13	37

- Date: September 1
- Location: Bulldog Stadium
  Fresno, CA
- Game start: 8:08 PM MST
- Elapsed time: 2:54
- Game attendance: 27,663
- Game weather: 84 °F (29 °C), Fair, winds WNW at 8mph
- Referee: Eddy Shelton

To open the season Weber faces another team with a new coaching staff. The match against Fresno State will be the Bulldogs coaching debut for Tim DeRuyter and will be only his second game as head coach overall.

Scoring summary

Quarter	Time	Drive			Team	Scoring information	Score	
Quarter	Time	Plays	Yards	TOP	Team	Scoring information	Weber St.	Fresno St.
1	9:30	8	97	2:27	Fresno State	Davante Adams 27-yard touchdown reception from Derek Carr, Quentin Breshears kick good	0	7
1	4:09	9	74	3:29	Fresno State	Robbie Rouse 2-yard touchdown run, Quentin Breshears kick good	0	14
2	14:03	6	58	2:08	Fresno State	Robbie Rouse 1-yard touchdown run, Quentin Breshears kick good	0	21
2	7:16	12	56	6:41	Weber State	40-yard field goal by Shaun McClain	3	21
2	0:46	8	24	2:30	Fresno State	39-yard field goal by Quentin Breshears	3	24
3	9:37	9	62	4:07	Weber State	Shaydon Kehano 36-yard touchdown reception from Mike Hoke, Shaun McClain kick good	10	24
4	8:26	1	38	0:08	Fresno State	Davante Adams 38-yard touchdown reception from Derek Carr, Quentin Breshears kick blocked	10	30
4	3:35	10	69	3:11	Fresno State	Milton Knox 4-yard touchdown run, Quentin Breshears kick good	10	37
"TOP" = time of possession. For other American football terms, see Glossary of American football.							10	37

=== BYU ===
Weber State at BYU

Team	1	2	3	4	Total
Wildcats	0	0	6	7	13
• Cougars	7	14	10	14	45

- Date: September 8
- Location: LaVell Edwards Stadium
  Provo, UT
- Game start: 1:05 PM MST
- Elapsed time: 3:13
- Game attendance: 60,314
- Game weather: 74 °F (23 °C), Clear, winds SW at 6mph
- Referee: Cooper Castlebe
- TV announcers (BYUtv): Dave McCann, Blaine Fowler, and Robbie Bullough

For only the third time in the schools histories, BYU and Weber State will meet in a collegiate football game.

Scoring summary

Quarter	Time	Drive			Team	Scoring information	Score	
Quarter	Time	Plays	Yards	TOP	Team	Scoring information	Weber State	BYU
1	3:19	9	90	3:37	BYU	Cody Hoffman 37-yard touchdown reception from Riley Nelson, Riley Stephenson kick good	0	7
2	13:12	4	49	1:40	BYU	Taysom Hill 2-yard touchdown run, Riley Stephenson kick good	0	14
2	4:51	8	71	3:47	BYU	Michael Alisa 8-yard touchdown run, Riley Stephenson kick good	0	21
3	8:42	3	42	1:03	BYU	Kaneakua Friel 2-yard touchdown reception from James Lark, Riley Stephenson kick good	0	28
3	4:49	9	75	3:53	Weber State	Josh Booker 1-yard touchdown run, Shaun McClain kick blocked	6	28
3	0:12	11	50	4:37	BYU	33-yard field goal by Riley Stephenson	6	31
4	13:10	3	23	0:51	BYU	James Lark 6-yard touchdown run, Riley Stephenson kick good	6	38
4	3:34	7	66	2:23	BYU	Taysom Hill 1-yard touchdown run, Riley Stephenson kick good	6	45
4	0:50	7	77	2:38	Weber State	Kris Parham 1-yard touchdown run, Shaun McClain kick good	13	45
"TOP" = time of possession. For other American football terms, see Glossary of American football.							13	45

=== McNeese State ===
#19 McNeese State at Weber State

Team	1	2	3	4	Total
• #19 Cowboys	0	14	7	14	35
Wildcats	0	0	7	14	21

- Date: September 15
- Location: Stewart Stadium
  Ogden, UT
- Game start: 6:05 PM MST
- Elapsed time: 2:53
- Game attendance: 9,617
- Game weather: 81 °F (27 °C), Sunny, winds N at 3mph
- Referee: Bruce Palmer
- TV announcers (Big Sky TV): Carl Arky and Ty Sparrow

After a previous home-and-home series in 1990 and 1992, the Cowboys and Wildcats find themselves knotted in head-to-head matches at 1–1, with each team having won the road game. The winner of the 2012 match will take the lead in the series, but it could be short lived as this is part of a home-and-home series that will continue in Lake Charles in 2013.

Scoring summary

Quarter	Time	Drive			Team	Scoring information	Score	
Quarter	Time	Plays	Yards	TOP	Team	Scoring information	McNeese St.	Weber St.
2	4:00	9	80	4:01	McNeese State	Darius Casey 3-yard touchdown run, Josh Lewis kick good	7	0
2	0:16	11	80	2:47	McNeese State	Cody Stroud 4-yard touchdown run, Josh Lewis kick good	14	0
3	11:25	7	33	1:59	Weber State	Shaydon Kehano 10-yard touchdown reception from Mike Hoke, Shaun McClain kick good	14	7
3	10:07	1	91	0:13	McNeese State	Dionate Spencer 91-yard touchdown run, Josh Lewis kick good	21	7
4	10:56	8	49	3:56	McNeese State	Jereon McGilvery 8-yard touchdown reception from Cody Stroud, Josh Lewis kick good	28	7
4	6:45	2	80	0:51	McNeese State	Javaris Murray 76-yard touchdown run, Josh Lewis kick good	35	7
4	3:50	10	66	2:49	Weber State	C. J. Tuckett 2-yard touchdown run, Shaun McClain kick good	35	14
4	0:20	7	63	1:01	Weber State	Jordan Adamczyk 3-yard touchdown run, Shaun McClain kick good	35	21
"TOP" = time of possession. For other American football terms, see Glossary of American football.							35	21

=== Eastern Washington ===
#9 Eastern Washington at Weber State

Team	1	2	3	4	Total
• #9 Eagles	10	10	9	3	32
Wildcats	0	3	16	7	26

- Date: September 22
- Location: Stewart Stadium
  Ogden, UT
- Game start: 6:05 PM MST
- Elapsed time: 3:02
- Game attendance: 9,434
- Game weather: 79 °F (26 °C), Sunny, winds SSW at 6mph
- Referee: Tom Frazier
- TV announcers (Big Sky TV): Steve Klauke and Ty Sparrow

2012 will feature the 31st meeting between the Eagles and the Wildcats. The series has been fairly even, with the Eagles holding a slim 16–14 advantage overall. However, the two are dead even in the overall series when facing each other in Ogden at 8–8.

Scoring summary

Quarter	Time	Drive			Team	Scoring information	Score	
Quarter	Time	Plays	Yards	TOP	Team	Scoring information	E. Washington	Weber St.
1	6:41	9	75	4:32	Eastern Washington	Jordan Talley 6-yard touchdown run, Jimmy Pavel kick good	7	0
1	2:15	8	59	2:21	Eastern Washington	25-yard field goal by Jimmy Pavel	10	0
2	8:18	6	55	2:12	Eastern Washington	Jordan Talley 7-yard touchdown run, Jimmy Pavel kick good	17	0
2	5:40	6	48	2:38	Weber State	44-yard field goal by Shaun McClain	17	3
2	1:06	10	43	2:25	Eastern Washington	19-yard field goal by Jimmy Pavel	20	3
3	13:01	3	42	1:21	Weber State	Lanny Papanikolas 28-yard touchdown reception from Mike Hoke, 2-point run by Jarret Gooden good	20	11
3	4:03	13	85	5:43	Eastern Washington	29-yard field goal by Jimmy Pavel	23	11
3	1:47	2	34	0:54	Eastern Washington	Brandon Kaufman 23-yard touchdown reception from Kyle Padron, Jimmy Pavel kick no good	29	11
3	0:00	4	75	1:47	Weber State	C. J. Tuckett 1-yard touchdown run, 2-point Kela Marciel pass to Trevor Pletcher good	29	19
4	6:25	15	65	8:41	Eastern Washington	27-yard field goal by Jimmy Pavel	32	19
4	3:43	13	76	2:36	Weber State	Eric Walker 18-yard touchdown reception from Mike Hoke, Shaun McClain kick good	32	26
"TOP" = time of possession. For other American football terms, see Glossary of American football.							32	26

=== UC Davis ===
Weber State at UC Davis

Team	1	2	3	4	Total
Wildcats	0	6	0	7	13
• Aggies	10	21	0	6	37

- Date: September 29
- Location: Aggie Stadium
  Davis, CA
- Game start: 7:07 PM MST
- Elapsed time: 2:54
- Game attendance: 7,569
- Game weather: 93 °F (34 °C), Clear and warm, winds SW at 7mph
- Referee: Jim Osborn
- TV announcers (Big Sky TV): Scott Marsh and Doug Kelly

The first conference road game for the Wildcats will feature the third ever meeting against UC Davis. Currently the series is even at 1–1. It will be the first trip for Weber to Davis as the previous two meetings (2004 & 2010) both took place in Ogden.

Scoring summary

Quarter	Time	Drive			Team	Scoring information	Score	
Quarter	Time	Plays	Yards	TOP	Team	Scoring information	Weber St.	UC Davis
1	13:15	7	62	1:45	UC Davis	Tim Benton 17-yard touchdown reception from Randy Wright, Brady Stuart kick good	0	7
1	5:16	4	2	1:37	UC Davis	44-yard field goal by Brady Stuart	0	10
2	14:46	8	68	2:24	UC Davis	Dalton Turay 1-yard touchdown run, Brady Stuart kick good	0	17
2	9:24	4	24	2:15	UC Davis	Dalton Turay 5-yard touchdown run, Brady Stuart kick good	0	24
2	1:37	10	71	4:55	UC Davis	Dalton Turay 1-yard touchdown run, Brady Stuart kick good	0	31
2	0:25	7	75	1:12	Weber State	Eric Walker 20-yard touchdown reception from Mike Hoke, 2-point Shaun McClain rush failed	6	31
4	12:44	12	53	3:27	UC Davis	32-yard field goal by Brady Stuart	6	34
4	11:06	4	-1	0:52	UC Davis	40-yard field goal by Brady Stuart	6	37
4	4:58	5	42	1:35	Weber State	Mike Hoke 2-yard touchdown run, Shaun McClain kick good	13	37
"TOP" = time of possession. For other American football terms, see Glossary of American football.							13	37

=== Cal Poly ===
Cal Poly at Weber State

Team	1	2	3	4	Total
• Mustangs	0	14	17	14	45
Wildcats	6	7	7	3	23

- Date: October 5
- Location: Stewart Stadium
  Ogden, UT
- Game start: 6:05 PM MST
- Elapsed time: 2:43
- Game attendance: 5,939
- Referee: Kelly Holman
- TV announcers (Big Sky TV): Carl Arky and Tom Sparrow

This will be the ninth meeting between the schools with the Wildcats leading the series at 5–3. Weber has won the two most recent meetings (2008 & 2009), but the Aggies won the three before that (2002, 2006, & 2007). This will be the fifth time the two schools have met in Ogden, with Weber holding a 3–1 advantage in the series at home.

Scoring summary

Quarter	Time	Drive			Team	Scoring information	Score	
Quarter	Time	Plays	Yards	TOP	Team	Scoring information	Cal Poly	Weber St.
1	8:26	15	70	6:34	Weber State	22-yard field goal by Shaun McClain	0	3
1	2:53	11	46	4:06	Weber State	46-yard field goal by Shaun McClain	0	6
2	11:06	2	29	0:37	Cal Poly	Kristaan Ivory 30-yard touchdown reception from Andre Broadous, Bobby Zalud kick good	7	6
2	7:09	8	75	3:57	Weber State	Eric Walker 9-yard touchdown reception from Mike Hoke, Shaun McClain kick good	7	13
2	3:06	9	56	3:55	Cal Poly	Brandon Howe 8-yard touchdown reception from Andre Broadous, Bobby Zalud kick good	14	13
3	10:08	7	77	2:31	Weber State	C. J. Tuckett 6-yard touchdown run, Shaun McClain kick good	14	20
3	5:22	12	65	4:16	Cal Poly	Kristaan Ivory 5-yard touchdown run, Bobby Zalud kick good	21	20
3	3:23				Cal Poly	Interception returned 36 yards for touchdown by Barrett Wangara, Bobby Zalud kick good	28	20
3	0:40	4	34	1:15	Cal Poly	44-yard field goal by Bobby Zalud	31	20
4	14:25	2	45	0:19	Cal Poly	Willie Tucker 34-yard touchdown reception from Andre Broadous, Bobby Zalud kick good	38	20
4	8:04	15	67	6:21	Weber State	25-yard field goal by Shaun McClain	38	23
4	7:28	2	46	0:36	Cal Poly	Brandon Howe 37-yard touchdown run, Bobby Zalud kick good	45	23
"TOP" = time of possession. For other American football terms, see Glossary of American football.							45	23

=== Sacramento State ===
Weber State at Sacramento State

Team	1	2	3	4	Total
Wildcats	0	7	0	7	14
• Hornets	0	7	5	7	19

- Date: October 13
- Location: Hornet Stadium
  Sacramento, CA
- Game start: 7:05 PM MST
- Elapsed time: 2:41
- Game attendance: 12,106
- Game weather: 72 °F (22 °C), Sunny, winds Calm
- Referee: Bruce Bondi
- TV announcers (Big Sky TV): Jason Ross and Steve McElroy

The series between Weber and Sacramento State may be going on its 19th meeting, but the series has been largely in favor of the Wildcats. Weber leads the series 11–5. At Hornet Stadium the Wildcats are 3–5, and Sacramento State has won 3 of the last 4 meetings in Sacramento.

=== Southern Utah ===
Weber State at Southern Utah

Team	1	2	3	4	Total
• Wildcats	0	14	7	3	24
Thunderbirds	3	0	6	13	22

- Date: October 20
- Location: Eccles Coliseum
  Cedar City, UT
- Game start: 1:05 PM MST
- Elapsed time: 3:00
- Game attendance: 3,811
- Game weather: 70 °F (21 °C), Sunny, Winds SW 10mph
- Referee: Gregg Wilson
- TV announcers (Big Sky TV): Art Challis and Matt Roan

This will be the Thunderbirds and Wildcats 19th meeting. The series has been one-sided in favor of Weber State at 14–4. However, Southern Utah had won three of the previous four meetings (2003, 2005, and 2006) before they met last year. It will be the fifth meeting in Cedar City, with Weber owning a 3–1 advantage.

=== Montana ===
Montana at Weber State

Team	1	2	3	4	Total
• Grizzlies	3	7	3	11	24
Wildcats	0	7	7	7	21

- Date: November 3
- Location: Stewart Stadium
  Ogden, UT
- Game start: 1:38 PM MST
- Elapsed time: 3:00
- Game attendance: 7,251
- Game weather: 58 °F (14 °C), Sunny
- Referee: Jim Crowley
- TV announcers (ROOT): Tom Glasgow, Sherdric Bonner, and Jenny Cavnar

The lone Weber State broadcast on the Big Sky game of the week will feature the 52nd meeting between the Wildcats and Montana. Montana has largely been in charge of this series, 38–13. Even in Ogden the Wildcats are a mere 7–17 against the Grizzlies. However Weber State has won the last two home contests (2008 & 2010).

=== Northern Colorado ===
Northern Colorado at Weber State

Team	1	2	3	4	Total
• Bears	9	19	0	14	42
Wildcats	7	10	3	14	34

- Date: November 10
- Location: Stewart Stadium
  Ogden, UT
- Game start: 1:35 PM MST
- Elapsed time: 3:10
- Game attendance: 4,837
- Game weather: 34 °F (1 °C), Overcast, Winds S 5mph
- Referee: Jim Osborn
- TV announcers (Big Sky TV): Carl Arky and Ty Sparrow

2012 features the seventh time that Northern Colorado and Weber State will meet. Northern Colorado is winless against Weber State (0–6).

=== Idaho State ===
Weber State at Idaho State

Team	1	2	3	4	Total
• Wildcats	16	11	0	13	40
Bengals	0	0	14	0	14

- Date: November 17
- Location: Holt Arena
  Pocatello, ID
- Game start: 4:05 PM MST
- Elapsed time: 2:41
- Game attendance: 5,125
- Game weather: Indoors
- Referee: Bruce Bondi
- TV announcers (Big Sky TV): Jerry Miller and Tim Lewis

The regular season closes with the 52nd meeting against the Idaho State Bengals. Weber leads the series 37–14. Weber State has won the past 9 contests, 15 of the last 16, and 25 of the past 27 overall in the series. The Bengals did take four of five from 1980 to 1984.
