= Tim Walsh (American football) =

American football player and coach (born 1954)

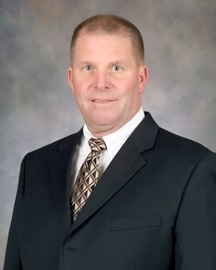
- Walsh in 2007 as Army offensive coordinator

Biographical details
- Born: December 17, 1954 (age 71); San Francisco, California, U.S.

Playing career
- 1974–1977: UC Riverside
- Position: Quarterback

Coaching career (HC unless noted)
- 1977–1980: San Mateo Junípero Serra HS (CA) (assistant)
- 1981–1985: Moreau Catholic HS (CA)
- 1986: Santa Clara (DC/LB)
- 1987–1988: Sonoma State (OC)
- 1989–1992: Sonoma State
- 1993–2006: Portland State
- 2007–2008: Army (OC/QB)
- 2009–2019: Cal Poly

Head coaching record
- Overall: 176–148 (college)
- Tournaments: 2–3 (NCAA D-II playoffs); 0–3 (NCAA D-I-AA/D-I playoffs)

Accomplishments and honors

Championships
- 1 NCAC (1991); 1 GWC (2011); 1 Big Sky (2012)

Timothy Edward Walsh (born December 16, 1954) is an American former football coach. He served as the head football coach at Sonoma State University from 1989 to 1992, Portland State University from 1993 to 2006, and California Polytechnic State University from 2012 to 2019, compiling a career college football coaching record of 176–148.

== Early life and education ==
Walsh graduated from Junípero Serra High School in San Mateo, California in 1973 and the University of California, Riverside in 1977. At UC Riverside, Walsh was a backup quarterback with the Highlanders and majored in history.

== Coaching career ==
From 1977 to 1980, Walsh was both an assistant coach and head coach at his alma mater Serra High School. He then was head coach at Moreau Catholic High School in Hayward, California from 1981 to 1985. In 1986, Walsh moved up to the college level as defensive coordinator and linebackers coach at Santa Clara. After two seasons as offensive coordinator, Walsh became head football coach at Sonoma State University in 1989. He went 27-14 in four seasons, leading the Cossacks to a Northern California Athletic Conference title in 1991.

Walsh was the head coach at Portland State from 1993 through 2006, succeeding Pokey Allen, who left for Boise State (after defeating the Broncos soundly in Boise in 1992). In his 14 years at Portland State, Walsh compiled a 90–68 record and guided the Vikings from a Division II program to a Division I-AA contender. Walsh's tenure at Portland State was the longest of any previous Portland State football head coach. The Vikings made the Division II playoffs in 1993, 1994, and 1995, and the I-AA playoffs in 2000.

On February 16, 2007, Walsh left Portland State to become offensive coordinator and quarterbacks coach at Army under Stan Brock. Army went 3–9 in Walsh's two seasons, 2007 and 2008.

Walsh became a head coach again on January 9, 2009, when Cal Poly hired him. He coached the Mustangs for 11 seasons with record of 59-66, earning conference titles in 2011 and 2012.

Walsh stepped down at the conclusion of the 2019 season, but was hired the following year as the varsity football head coach at Santa Margarita Catholic High School in Rancho Santa Margarita, California, but stepped down later that year due to health reasons before he ever coached a game. Since then, he has retired from coaching.

== Head coaching record ==
=== College ===
Year	Team	Overall	Conference	Standing	Bowl/playoffs	TSN/STATS^{#}	Coaches^{°}
Sonoma State Cossacks (Northern California Athletic Conference) (1989–1992)
1989	Sonoma State	4–6	3–5	4th			
1990	Sonoma State	7–3	4–1	2nd			
1991	Sonoma State	9–2	5–0	1st			
1992	Sonoma State	7–3	3–2	T–2nd			
Sonoma State:		27–14	15–8				
Portland State Vikings (NCAA Division II independent) (1993–1995)
1993	Portland State	8–3			L NCAA Division II First Round		
1994	Portland State	9–3			L NCAA Division II Quarterfinal		
1995	Portland State	8–5			L NCAA Division II Quarterfinal		
Portland State:		25–11					
Portland State Vikings (Big Sky Conference) (1996–2006)
1996	Portland State	3–8	1–7	8th			
1997	Portland State	4–7	3–5	7th			
1998	Portland State	5–6	4–4	T–4th			
1999	Portland State	8–3	6–2	T–2nd			
2000	Portland State	8–4	5–3	T–2nd	L NCAA Division I-AA First Round		
2001	Portland State	7–4	5–2	T–2nd			
2002	Portland State	6–5	3–4	T–4th			
2003	Portland State	4–7	1–6	7th			
2004	Portland State	7–4	4–3	T–3rd			
2005	Portland State	6–5	4–3	T–3rd			
2006	Portland State	7–4	6–2	T–2nd			
Portland State:		65–57	42–41				
Cal Poly Mustangs (Great West Conference) (2009–2011)
2009	Cal Poly	4–7	1–3	5th			
2010	Cal Poly	7–4	2–2	3rd			
2011	Cal Poly	6–5	3–1	T–1st			
Cal Poly Mustangs (Big Sky Conference) (2012–2019)
2012	Cal Poly	9–3	7–1	T–1st	L NCAA Division I Second Round	12	11
2013	Cal Poly	6–6	5–3	T–4th			
2014	Cal Poly	7–5	5–3	T–5th			
2015	Cal Poly	4–7	3–5	T–8th			
2016	Cal Poly	7–5	5–3	T–4th	L NCAA Division I First Round	24	T–21
2017	Cal Poly	1–10	1–7	12th			
2018	Cal Poly	5–6	4–4	T–6th			
2019	Cal Poly	3–8	2–6	T–9th			
Cal Poly:		59–66	38–38				
Total:		176–148					
National championship Conference title Conference division title or championship game berth
^{#}Rankings from final The Sports Network FCS Poll.; ^{°}Rankings from final FCS Coaches Poll.
