= 2012 UC Davis Aggies football team =

American college football season

2012 UC Davis Aggies football
- Conference: Big Sky Conference
- Record: 4–7 (3–5 Big Sky)
- Head coach: Bob Biggs (20th season)
- Co-offensive coordinators: Kevin Daft (1st season); Tim Plough (1st season)
- Defensive coordinator: Mark Johnson (4th season)
- Home stadium: Aggie Stadium

2012 Big Sky Conference football standings
	Conf.			Overall
Team	W		L	W		L
No. 4 Eastern Washington +^	7	–	1	11	–	3
No. 5 Montana State +^	7	–	1	11	–	2
No. 12 Cal Poly +^	7	–	1	9	–	3
No. 20 Northern Arizona	6	–	2	8	–	3
Sacramento State	4	–	4	6	–	5
Northern Colorado	4	–	4	5	–	6
Southern Utah	4	–	4	5	–	6
North Dakota	3	–	5	5	–	6
Montana	3	–	5	5	–	6
UC Davis	3	–	5	4	–	7
Portland State	2	–	6	3	–	8
Weber State	2	–	6	2	–	9
Idaho State	0	–	8	1	–	10
$ – Conference champion; ^ – FCS playoff participant; Rankings from The Sports Network poll

The 2012 UC Davis football team represented the University of California, Davis as a member of the Big Sky Conference during the 2012 NCAA Division I FCS football season. Led by Bob Biggs in his 20th and final season as head coach, UC Davis compiled an overall record of 4–7 with a mark of 3–5 in conference play, placing in three-way tie for eighth in the Big Sky. The Aggies played home games at Aggie Stadium in Davis, California.

== Schedule ==
Date	Time	Opponent	Site	TV	Result	Attendance
August 30	6:00 pm	Azusa Pacific*	Aggie Stadium; Davis, CA	Big Sky TV	W 41–3	5,903
September 8	5:00 pm	at San Jose State*	Spartan Stadium; San Jose, CA		L 13–45	7,462
September 15	12:00 pm	at South Dakota State*	Coughlin–Alumni Stadium; Brookings, SD	Big Sky TV	L 8–12	11,532
September 22	6:00 pm	at Cal Poly	Alex G. Spanos Stadium; San Luis Obispo, CA (Battle for the Golden Horseshoe)	KSBY/Big Sky TV	L 20–28	11,075
September 29	6:00 pm	Weber State	Aggie Stadium; Davis, CA	Big Sky TV	W 37–13	7,569
October 6	4:00 pm	No. 2 Montana State^{†}	Aggie Stadium; Davis, CA	RTNW/RTRM	L 41–48	9,877
October 13	3:00 pm	at Idaho State	Holt Arena; Pocatello, ID	Big Sky TV	W 52–45	5,212
October 20	4:00 pm	at No. 16 Northern Arizona	Walkup Skydome; Flagstaff, AZ	Big Sky TV	L 7–21	7,991
October 27	2:00 pm	Portland State	Aggie Stadium; Davis, CA	Big Sky TV	L 21–49	7,826
November 10	1:30 pm	at No. 5 Eastern Washington	Roos Field; Cheney, WA	SWX/Big Sky TV	L 28–31	6,011
November 17	3:00 pm	Sacramento State	Aggie Stadium; Davis, CA (Causeway Classic)	CSNCA/Big Sky TV	W 34–27	9,899
*Non-conference game; ^{†}Homecoming; Rankings from The Sports Network Poll released prior to the game; All times are in Pacific time

== Game summaries ==
=== Azusa Pacific ===
	1	2	3	4	Total
Cougars	0	3	0	0	3
Aggies	10	17	7	7	41

=== @ San Jose State ===
	1	2	3	4	Total
Aggies	7	0	0	6	13
Spartans	0	14	21	10	45

=== @ South Dakota State ===
	1	2	3	4	Total
Aggies	0	8	0	0	8
Jackrabbits	0	6	0	6	12

=== @ Cal Poly ===
	1	2	3	4	Total
Aggies	10	0	0	10	20
Mustangs	7	7	14	0	28

=== Weber State ===
	1	2	3	4	Total
Wildcats	0	6	0	7	13
Aggies	10	21	0	6	37

=== Montana State ===
	1	2	3	4	Total
#2 Bobcats	7	24	0	17	48
Aggies	14	0	24	3	41

=== @ Idaho State ===
	1	2	3	4	Total
Aggies	10	14	14	14	52
Bengals	14	3	14	14	45

=== @ Northern Arizona ===
	1	2	3	4	Total
Aggies	0	0	0	7	7
#16 Lumberjacks	0	7	14	0	21

=== Portland State ===
	1	2	3	4	Total
Vikings	7	7	14	21	49
Aggies	7	7	0	7	21

=== @ Eastern Washington ===
	1	2	3	4	Total
Aggies	3	22	3	0	28
#5 Eagles	14	0	10	7	31

=== Sacramento State ===
	1	2	3	4	Total
Hornets	6	7	7	7	27
Aggies	5	18	3	8	34
