= 2012 Cal Poly Mustangs football team =

American college football season

2012 Cal Poly Mustangs football

Big Sky co-champion

NCAA Division I Second Round, L 16–18 vs. Sam Houston State
- Conference: Big Sky Conference

Ranking
- Sports Network: No. 12
- FCS Coaches: No. 12
- Record: 9–3 (7–1 Big Sky)
- Head coach: Tim Walsh (4th season)
- Co-offensive coordinators: Brian Cook (4th season); Saga Tuitele (4th season)
- Offensive scheme: Spread triple-option
- Defensive coordinator: Josh Brown (1st season)
- Base defense: Multiple 4–3
- Home stadium: Alex G. Spanos Stadium

2012 Big Sky Conference football standings
	Conf.			Overall
Team	W		L	W		L
No. 4 Eastern Washington +^	7	–	1	11	–	3
No. 5 Montana State +^	7	–	1	11	–	2
No. 12 Cal Poly +^	7	–	1	9	–	3
No. 20 Northern Arizona	6	–	2	8	–	3
Sacramento State	4	–	4	6	–	5
Northern Colorado	4	–	4	5	–	6
Southern Utah	4	–	4	5	–	6
North Dakota	3	–	5	5	–	6
Montana	3	–	5	5	–	6
UC Davis	3	–	5	4	–	7
Portland State	2	–	6	3	–	8
Weber State	2	–	6	2	–	9
Idaho State	0	–	8	1	–	10
$ – Conference champion; ^ – FCS playoff participant; Rankings from The Sports Network poll

The 2012 Cal Poly Mustangs football team represented California Polytechnic State University, San Luis Obispo as member of the Big Sky Conference during the 2012 NCAA Division I FCS football season. Led by fourth-year head coach Tim Walsh, Cal Poly compiled an overall record of 9–3 with a mark of 7–1 in conference play, sharing the Big Sky title Eastern Washington and Montana State. The Mustangs received an at-large bid to the NCAA Division I Football Championship, where after a first-round bye, they lost to Sam Houston State in the second round. The team played home games at Alex G. Spanos Stadium in San Luis Obispo, California.

== Schedule ==
Date	Time	Opponent	Rank	Site	TV	Result	Attendance
September 1	4:05 pm	San Diego*		Alex G. Spanos Stadium; San Luis Obispo, CA	Big Sky TV	W 41–14	6,022
September 15	3:00 pm	at Wyoming*		War Memorial Stadium; Laramie, WY		W 24–22	21,728
September 22	6:05 pm	UC Davis		Alex G. Spanos Stadium; San Luis Obispo, CA (Battle for the Golden Horseshoe)	KSBY, Big Sky TV	W 28–20	11,075
September 29	4:00 pm	at North Dakota	No. 23	Alerus Center; Grand Forks, ND	Midco Sports Net, Big Sky TV	W 35–17	9,531
October 5	5:00 pm	at Weber State	No. 20	Stewart Stadium; Ogden, UT	Big Sky TV	W 45–23	5,939
October 13	6:05 pm	Northern Colorado	No. 15	Alex G. Spanos Stadium; San Luis Obispo, CA	KSBY, Big Sky TV	W 56–28	9,382
October 20	6:05 pm	Portland State^{†}	No. 14	Alex G. Spanos Stadium; San Luis Obispo, CA	KSBY, Big Sky TV	W 37–25	10,025
October 27	6:05 pm	at Sacramento State	No. 11	Hornet Stadium; Sacramento, CA	Big Sky TV	L 29–35	8,113
November 3	1:35 pm	at No. 7 Eastern Washington*	No. 16	Roos Field; Cheney, WA	Big Sky TV	L 17–34	8,644
November 10	6:05 pm	Idaho State	No. 19	Alex G. Spanos Stadium; San Luis Obispo, CA	KSBY, Big Sky TV	W 70–14	6,326
November 17	3:05 pm	at No. 15 Northern Arizona	No. 17	Walkup Skydome; Flagstaff, AZ	Big Sky TV	W 42–34	6,119
December 1	1:00 pm	at No. 5 Sam Houston State*	No. 12	Bowers Stadium; Huntsville, TX (NCAA Division I Second Round)	ESPN3	L 16–18	7,073
*Non-conference game; ^{†}Homecoming; Rankings from The Sports Network Poll released prior to the game; All times are in Pacific time

The game against Eastern Washington, fellow Big Sky member, on November 3 was considered a non-conference game and had no effect on the Big Sky standings.

== Game summaries ==
=== San Diego ===
	1	2	3	4	Total
Toreros	0	7	7	0	14
Mustangs	10	3	7	21	41

=== @ Wyoming ===
	1	2	3	4	Total
Mustangs	14	0	7	3	24
Cowboys	0	15	0	7	22

=== UC Davis ===
	1	2	3	4	Total
Aggies	10	0	0	10	20
Mustangs	7	7	14	0	28

=== @ North Dakota ===
	1	2	3	4	Total
#23 Mustangs	14	0	0	21	35
North Dakota	0	7	3	7	17

=== @ Weber State ===
	1	2	3	4	Total
#20 Mustangs	0	14	17	14	45
Wildcats	6	7	7	3	23

=== Northern Colorado ===
	1	2	3	4	Total
Bears	14	0	0	14	28
#15 Mustangs	14	14	14	14	56

=== Portland State ===
	1	2	3	4	Total
Vikings	14	3	8	0	25
#14 Mustangs	14	3	6	14	37

=== @ Sacramento State ===
	1	2	3	4	Total
#11 Mustangs	0	17	6	6	29
Hornets	7	21	0	7	35

=== @ Eastern Washington ===
	1	2	3	4	Total
#16 Mustangs	3	7	0	7	17
#7 Eagles	14	10	7	3	34

=== Idaho State ===
	1	2	3	4	Total
Bengals	0	7	7	0	14
#19 Mustangs	28	14	14	14	70

=== @ Northern Arizona ===
	1	2	3	4	Total
#17 Mustangs	14	7	14	7	42
#15 Lumberjacks	7	6	7	14	34

=== @ Sam Houston State–NCAA Division I Second Round ===
	1	2	3	4	Total
#12 Mustangs	0	0	6	10	16
#5 Bearkats	0	8	7	3	18
