= 2012 Northern Colorado Bears football team =

American college football season

2012 Northern Colorado Bears football
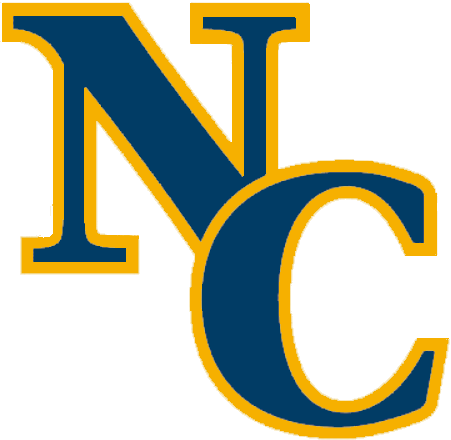
- Conference: Big Sky Conference
- Record: 5–6 (4–4 Big Sky)
- Head coach: Earnest Collins Jr. (2nd season)
- Offensive coordinator: Michael Armour (2nd season)
- Offensive scheme: Spread
- Defensive coordinator: Zach Shay (2nd season)
- Base defense: 4–3
- Home stadium: Nottingham Field

2012 Big Sky Conference football standings
	Conf.			Overall
Team	W		L	W		L
No. 4 Eastern Washington +^	7	–	1	11	–	3
No. 5 Montana State +^	7	–	1	11	–	2
No. 12 Cal Poly +^	7	–	1	9	–	3
No. 20 Northern Arizona	6	–	2	8	–	3
Sacramento State	4	–	4	6	–	5
Northern Colorado	4	–	4	5	–	6
Southern Utah	4	–	4	5	–	6
North Dakota	3	–	5	5	–	6
Montana	3	–	5	5	–	6
UC Davis	3	–	5	4	–	7
Portland State	2	–	6	3	–	8
Weber State	2	–	6	2	–	9
Idaho State	0	–	8	1	–	10
$ – Conference champion; ^ – FCS playoff participant; Rankings from The Sports Network poll

The 2012 Northern Colorado Bears football team represented the University of Northern Colorado in the 2012 NCAA Division I FCS football season. They were led by second-year head coach Earnest Collins Jr. and played their home games at Nottingham Field. They are a member of the Big Sky Conference. They finished the season 5–6, 4–4 in Big Sky play to finish in a three way tie for fifth place.

== Schedule ==
Date	Time	Opponent	Site	TV	Result	Attendance
August 30	5:15 pm	at Utah*	Rice-Eccles Stadium; Salt Lake City, UT	P12N	L 0–41	45,273
September 8	1:30 pm	Colorado Mesa*	Nottingham Field; Greeley, CO	ALT/Big Sky TV	W 40–3	5,136
September 15	3:00 pm	at Sacramento State*	Hornet Stadium; Sacramento, CA	Big Sky TV	L 17–28	7,408
September 22	1:30 pm	at No. 2 Montana State	Bobcat Stadium; Bozeman, MT	Max Media/Big Sky TV	L 16–41	18,637
October 6	1:30 pm	Montana^{†}	Nottingham Field; Greeley, CO	RTRM	L 17–40	4,751
October 13	7:00 pm	at No. 15 Cal Poly	Alex G. Spanos Stadium; San Luis Obispo, CA	KSBY/Big Sky TV	L 28–56	9,382
October 20	1:30 pm	Idaho State	Nottingham Field; Greeley, CO	Big Sky TV	W 52–14	4,155
October 27	1:30 pm	No. 13 Northern Arizona	Nottingham Field; Greeley, CO	Big Sky TV	L 10–12	3,780
November 3	2:00 pm	at Portland State	Jeld-Wen Field; Portland, OR	Big Sky TV	W 32–28	5,077
November 10	1:30 pm	at Weber State	Stewart Stadium; Ogden, UT	Big Sky TV	W 42–34	4,837
November 17	12:00 pm	North Dakota	Nottingham Field; Greeley, CO	Big Sky TV	W 28–27	3,418
*Non-conference game; ^{†}Homecoming; Rankings from The Sports Network Poll released prior to the game; All times are in Mountain time

Despite Sacramento State also being a member of the Big Sky, their meeting on September 15 was considered a non-conference game.

- Source: Official Schedule

== Game summaries ==
=== @ Utah ===
	1	2	3	4	Total
Bears	0	0	0	0	0
Utes	0	21	7	13	41

=== Colorado Mesa ===
	1	2	3	4	Total
Mavericks	0	3	0	0	3
Bears	7	3	16	14	40

The win is the Bears first win since the final game of the 2010 season against Portland State, a span of 12 games. It is also just their second win in their last 21 games.

=== @ Sacramento State ===
	1	2	3	4	Total
Bears	3	7	0	7	17
Hornets	7	7	7	7	28

=== @ Montana State ===
	1	2	3	4	Total
Bears	0	13	3	0	16
#2 Bobcats	21	10	7	3	41

=== Montana ===
	1	2	3	4	Total
Grizzlies	0	10	14	16	40
Bears	0	0	10	7	17

=== @ Cal Poly ===
	1	2	3	4	Total
Bears	14	0	0	14	28
#15 Mustangs	14	14	14	14	56

=== Idaho State ===
	1	2	3	4	Total
Bengals	0	7	0	7	14
Bears	14	14	24	0	52

=== Northern Arizona ===
	1	2	3	4	Total
#13 Lumberjacks	2	7	0	3	12
Bears	0	3	0	7	10

=== @ Portland State ===
	1	2	3	4	Total
Bears	3	7	15	7	32
Vikings	6	15	7	0	28

=== @ Weber State ===
	1	2	3	4	Total
Bears	9	19	0	14	42
Wildcats	7	10	3	14	34

=== North Dakota ===
	1	2	3	4	Total
North Dakota	14	10	3	0	27
Bears	7	14	7	0	28
