= 2012 Sacramento State Hornets football team =

American college football season

2012 Sacramento State Hornets football
- Conference: Big Sky Conference
- Record: 6–5 (4–4 Big Sky)
- Head coach: Marshall Sperbeck (6th season)
- Offensive coordinator: Paul Peterson (1st season)
- Defensive coordinator: Anthony Parker (3rd season)
- Home stadium: Hornet Stadium

2012 Big Sky Conference football standings
	Conf.			Overall
Team	W		L	W		L
No. 4 Eastern Washington +^	7	–	1	11	–	3
No. 5 Montana State +^	7	–	1	11	–	2
No. 12 Cal Poly +^	7	–	1	9	–	3
No. 20 Northern Arizona	6	–	2	8	–	3
Sacramento State	4	–	4	6	–	5
Northern Colorado	4	–	4	5	–	6
Southern Utah	4	–	4	5	–	6
North Dakota	3	–	5	5	–	6
Montana	3	–	5	5	–	6
UC Davis	3	–	5	4	–	7
Portland State	2	–	6	3	–	8
Weber State	2	–	6	2	–	9
Idaho State	0	–	8	1	–	10
$ – Conference champion; ^ – FCS playoff participant; Rankings from The Sports Network poll

The 2012 Sacramento State Hornets football team represented California State University, Sacramento as a member of the Big Sky Conference during the 2012 NCAA Division I FCS football season. Led by sixth-year head coach Marshall Sperbeck, Sacramento State compiled an overall record of 6–5 with a mark of 4–4 in conference play, placing in a three-way tie for fifth in the Big Sky. The Hornets played home games at Hornet Stadium in Sacramento, California.

== Schedule ==
Date	Time	Opponent	Site	TV	Result	Attendance
September 1	5:00 pm	at New Mexico State*	Aggie Memorial Stadium; Las Cruces, NM	AggieVision/ALT/ESPN3	L 19–49	12,118
September 8	12:00 pm	at Colorado*	Folsom Field; Boulder, CO	PAC-12 Network	W 30–28	46,843
September 15	2:00 pm	Northern Colorado*	Hornet Stadium; Sacramento, CA	Big Sky TV	W 28–17	7,408
September 22	6:00 pm	North Dakota	Hornet Stadium; Sacramento, CA	Big Sky TV	L 13–35	10,774
September 29	12:30 pm	at Idaho State	Holt Arena; Pocatello, ID	Big Sky TV	W 54–31	7,882
October 6	12:00 pm	at Southern Utah	Eccles Coliseum; Cedar City, UT	Big Sky TV	W 27–22	3,766
October 13	6:00 pm	Weber State	Hornet Stadium; Sacramento, CA	Big Sky TV	W 19–14	12,106
October 20	4:00 pm	at No. 1 Eastern Washington	Roos Field; Cheney, WA	Comcast Hometown Network / Big Sky TV	L 28–31	8,714
October 27	6:00 pm	No. 11 Cal Poly	Hornet Stadium; Sacramento, CA	Big Sky TV	W 35–29	8,113
November 3	4:00 pm	No. 3 Montana State	Hornet Stadium; Sacramento, CA	RTNW	L 17–20	7,143
November 17	3:00 pm	at UC Davis	Aggie Stadium; Davis, CA (Causeway Classic)	CSNCA / Big Sky TV	L 27–34	9,899
*Non-conference game; Rankings from The Sports Network Poll released prior to the game; All times are in Pacific time

Despite Northern Colorado also being a member of the Big Sky Conference, the September 15 game against Sacramento State was considered a non-conference game.

== Game summaries ==
=== @ New Mexico State ===
	1	2	3	4	Total
Hornets	0	10	9	0	19
Aggies	7	21	0	21	49

=== @ Colorado ===
	1	2	3	4	Total
Hornets	7	17	0	6	30
Buffaloes	14	7	7	0	28

=== Northern Colorado ===
	1	2	3	4	Total
Bears	3	7	0	7	17
Hornets	7	7	7	7	28

=== North Dakota ===
	1	2	3	4	Total
North Dakota	7	7	14	7	35
Hornets	7	0	0	6	13

=== @ Idaho State ===
	1	2	3	4	Total
Hornets	14	13	7	20	54
Bengals	14	9	0	8	31

=== @ Southern Utah ===
	1	2	3	4	Total
Hornets	7	0	13	7	27
Thunderbirds	3	13	6	0	22

=== Weber State ===
	1	2	3	4	Total
Wildcats	0	7	0	7	14
Hornets	0	7	5	7	19

=== @ Eastern Washington ===
	1	2	3	4	Total
Hornets	7	0	7	14	28
#1 Eagles	3	10	11	7	31

=== Cal Poly ===
	1	2	3	4	Total
#11 Mustangs	10	17	6	6	39
Hornets	7	21	0	7	35

=== Montana State ===
	1	2	3	4	Total
#3 Bobcats	7	3	3	7	20
Hornets	3	7	7	0	17

=== @ UC Davis ===
	1	2	3	4	Total
Hornets	6	7	7	7	27
Aggies	5	18	3	8	34
