= 2012 Southern Utah Thunderbirds football team =

American college football season

2012 Southern Utah Thunderbirds football
- Conference: Big Sky Conference
- Record: 5–6 (4–4 Big Sky)
- Head coach: Ed Lamb (5th season)
- Offensive coordinator: Steve Clark
- Defensive coordinator: Justin Ena
- Home stadium: Eccles Coliseum

2012 Big Sky Conference football standings
	Conf.			Overall
Team	W		L	W		L
No. 4 Eastern Washington +^	7	–	1	11	–	3
No. 5 Montana State +^	7	–	1	11	–	2
No. 12 Cal Poly +^	7	–	1	9	–	3
No. 20 Northern Arizona	6	–	2	8	–	3
Sacramento State	4	–	4	6	–	5
Northern Colorado	4	–	4	5	–	6
Southern Utah	4	–	4	5	–	6
North Dakota	3	–	5	5	–	6
Montana	3	–	5	5	–	6
UC Davis	3	–	5	4	–	7
Portland State	2	–	6	3	–	8
Weber State	2	–	6	2	–	9
Idaho State	0	–	8	1	–	10
$ – Conference champion; ^ – FCS playoff participant; Rankings from The Sports Network poll

The 2012 Southern Utah Thunderbirds football team represented Southern Utah University in the Big Sky Conference during the 2012 NCAA Division I FCS football season. Led by fifth-year head coach Ed Lamb, the Thunderbirds played their home games at Eccles Coliseum in Cedar City, Utah.

In their first year as a member of the Big Sky, they were 5–6 overall (4–4 in Big Sky, tied for fifth).

== Schedule ==
Date	Time	Opponent	Site	TV	Result	Attendance
August 30	6:00 pm	at Utah State*	Romney Stadium; Logan, UT	KMYU/ESPN3	L 3–34	17,009
September 8	1:00 pm	at California*	Memorial Stadium; Berkeley, CA	PAC-12 Network	L 31–50	57,745
September 15	6:00 pm	New Mexico Highlands*	Eccles Coliseum; Cedar City, UT	Big Sky TV	W 45–23	7,835
September 22	6:00 pm	at Portland State	Jeld-Wen Field; Portland, OR	CSNNW/Big Sky TV	W 49–42	6,353
September 29	1:30 pm	No. 2 Montana State^{†}	Eccles Coliseum; Cedar City, UT	ROOT	L 17–24	8,417
October 6	1:00 pm	Sacramento State	Eccles Coliseum; Cedar City, UT	Big Sky TV	L 22–27	3,766
October 13	1:30 pm	at Montana	Washington–Grizzly Stadium; Missoula, MT	Max Media/Big Sky TV	W 30–20	25,684
October 20	1:00 pm	Weber State	Eccles Coliseum; Cedar City, UT	Big Sky TV	L 22–24	3,811
October 27	1:00 pm	No. 1 Eastern Washington	Eccles Coliseum; Cedar City, UT	Big Sky TV	W 30–27	3,344
November 3	12:00 pm	at North Dakota	Alerus Center; Grand Forks, ND	Midco SN/Big Sky TV	L 29–33	7,144
November 10	4:00 pm	at No. 11 Northern Arizona	Walkup Skydome; Flagstaff, AZ (rivalry)	NAU-TV/Big Sky TV	W 35–29 ^{3OT}	4,125
*Non-conference game; ^{†}Homecoming; Rankings from The Sports Network Poll released prior to the game; All times are in Mountain time

== Game summaries ==
=== Utah State ===
Southern Utah at Utah State

Team	1	2	3	4	Total
Thunderbirds	0	3	0	0	3
• Aggies	21	0	7	6	34

- Date: August 30
- Location: Romney Stadium
  Logan, UT
- Game start: 6:07 pm MST
- Elapsed time: 3:01
- Game attendance: 17,009
- Game weather: 84 °F (29 °C)
- Referee: Robert Cameron
- TV announcers (KMYU): Mychal Clanton, Kevin White, and Brooks Hansen

=== Cal ===
Southern Utah at Cal

Team	1	2	3	4	Total
Thunderbirds	3	7	7	14	31
• Golden Bears	0	20	0	30	50

- Date: September 8
- Location: California Memorial Stadium
  Berkeley, CA
- Game start: 1:07 pm MST
- Elapsed time: 3:23
- Game attendance: 57,745
- Game weather: 62 °F (17 °C), clear, winds W 13 mph
- Referee: M Mothershed
- TV announcers (Pac-12 Network): Rich Cellini, Gary Plummer, and Erin Coscareli

=== New Mexico Highlands ===
New Mexico Highlands at Southern Utah

Team	1	2	3	4	Total
Cowboys	0	20	0	3	23
• Thunderbirds	0	21	10	14	45

- Date: September 15
- Location: Eccles Coliseum
  Cedar City, UT
- Game start: 6:05 pm MST
- Elapsed time: 3:14
- Game attendance: 7,835
- Referee: Bruce Bondi
- TV announcers (Big Sky TV): Art Challis and Matt Roan

=== Portland State ===
Southern Utah at Portland State

Team	1	2	3	4	Total
• Thunderbirds	3	17	15	14	49
Vikings	21	7	14	0	42

- Date: September 22
- Location: Jeld-Wen Field
  Portland, OR
- Game start: 5:07 pm MST
- Elapsed time: 3:26
- Game attendance: 6,353
- Game weather: 68 °F (20 °C), Sunny, winds calm
- Referee: Gregg Wilson
- TV announcers (Comcast SportsNet Northwest/Big Sky TV): Bob Akamian, Mouse Davis, and Trysta Krick

=== Montana State ===
Montana State at Southern Utah

Team	1	2	3	4	Total
• #2 Bobcats	7	7	3	7	24
Thunderbirds	0	7	0	10	17

- Date: September 29
- Location: Eccles Coliseum
  Cedar City, UT
- Game start: 1:38 pm MST
- Elapsed time: 3:09
- Game attendance: 8,417
- Game weather: 78 °F (26 °C), Sunny, winds N @ 5mph
- Referee: Jim Crowley
- TV announcers (ROOT): Tom Glasgow, Sherdric Bonner, and Jen Mueller

=== Sacramento State ===
Sacramento State at Southern Utah

Team	1	2	3	4	Total
• Hornets	7	0	13	7	27
Thunderbirds	3	13	6	0	22

- Date: October 6
- Location: Eccles Coliseum
  Cedar City, UT
- Game start: 1:05 pm MST
- Elapsed time: 2:47
- Game attendance: 3,766
- Game weather: 70 °F (21 °C), Mostly Sunny, winds WNW
- Referee: Bruce Palmer
- TV announcers (Big Sky TV): Art Challis and Matt Roan

=== Montana ===
Southern Utah at Montana

Team	1	2	3	4	Total
• Thunderbirds	6	7	7	10	30
Grizzlies	7	10	0	3	20

- Date: October 13
- Location: Washington–Grizzly Stadium
  Missoula, MT
- Game start: 1:30 pm MST
- Elapsed time: 3:20
- Game attendance: 25,684
- Game weather: 57 °F (14 °C), Cloudy, Winds 5-10mph
- Referee: Tom Frazier
- TV announcers (Max Media/Big Sky TV): Chris Byers and John Edwards

=== Weber State ===
Weber State at Southern Utah

Team	1	2	3	4	Total
• Wildcats	0	14	7	3	24
Thunderbirds	3	0	6	13	22

- Date: October 20
- Location: Eccles Coliseum
  Cedar City, UT
- Game start: 1:05 pm MST
- Elapsed time: 3:00
- Game attendance: 3,811
- Game weather: 70 °F (21 °C), Sunny, Winds SW 10mph
- Referee: Gregg Wilson
- TV announcers (Big Sky TV): Art Challis and Matt Roan

=== Eastern Washington ===
Eastern Washington at Southern Utah

Team	1	2	3	4	Total
#1 Eagles	7	6	14	0	27
• Thunderbirds	7	6	7	10	30

- Date: October 27
- Location: Eccles Coliseum
  Cedar City, UT
- Television network: Big Sky TV

=== North Dakota ===
Southern Utah at North Dakota

Team	1	2	3	4	Total
Thunderbirds	3	19	0	7	29
• North Dakota	0	13	13	7	33

- Date: November 3
- Location: Alerus Center
  Grand Forks, ND
- TV announcers (Midco Sports Net/Big Sky TV): Dan Hammer, Tony Stein, and Danny Luetzen

=== Northern Arizona ===
Southern Utah at Northern Arizona

Team	1	2	3	4	OT	Total
• Thunderbirds	9	3	0	3	20	35
Lumberjacks	0	0	7	8	14	29

- Date: November 10
- Location: Walkup Skydome
  Flagstaff, AZ
- Game weather: Indoors
- TV announcers (NAU-TV/Big Sky TV): Mitch Strohman, Kevin Stephens, and Marc Buckhout
