= 2012 Montana State Bobcats football team =

American college football season

2012 Montana State Bobcats football
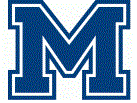

Big Sky co-champion

NCAA Division I Quarterfinal, L 16–34 vs. Sam Houston State
- Conference: Big Sky Conference

Ranking
- Sports Network: No. 5
- FCS Coaches: No. 5
- Record: 11–2 (7–1 Big Sky)
- Head coach: Rob Ash (6th season)
- Offensive coordinator: Kevin McGiven (1st season)
- Defensive coordinator: Jamie Marshall (6th season)
- Home stadium: Bobcat Stadium

2012 Big Sky Conference football standings
	Conf.			Overall
Team	W		L	W		L
No. 4 Eastern Washington +^	7	–	1	11	–	3
No. 5 Montana State +^	7	–	1	11	–	2
No. 12 Cal Poly +^	7	–	1	9	–	3
No. 20 Northern Arizona	6	–	2	8	–	3
Sacramento State	4	–	4	6	–	5
Northern Colorado	4	–	4	5	–	6
Southern Utah	4	–	4	5	–	6
North Dakota	3	–	5	5	–	6
Montana	3	–	5	5	–	6
UC Davis	3	–	5	4	–	7
Portland State	2	–	6	3	–	8
Weber State	2	–	6	2	–	9
Idaho State	0	–	8	1	–	10
$ – Conference champion; ^ – FCS playoff participant; Rankings from The Sports Network poll

The 2012 Montana State Bobcats football team represented Montana State University as a member of the Big Sky Conference during the 2012 NCAA Division I FCS football season. The Bobcats were led by sixth-year head coach Rob Ash and played their home games at Bobcat Stadium. They finished the season 11–2 overall and 7–1 in Big Sky play to share the conference championship with Cal Poly and Eastern Washington. The received an at–large bid into the FCS playoffs where they defeated Stony Brook in the second round before falling to Sam Houston State in the quarterfinals. It was the second straight year the Bobcats were knocked out of the playoffs by Sam Houston State.

== Schedule ==
Date	Time	Opponent	Rank	Site	TV	Result	Attendance
August 30	7:05 pm	Chadron State*	No. 4	Bobcat Stadium; Bozeman, MT	Max Media/Big Sky TV	W 33–6	20,767
September 8	5:05 pm	at Drake*	No. 4	Drake Stadium; Des Moines, IA		W 34–24	3,558
September 15	1:35 pm	No. 23 Stephen F. Austin*	No. 3	Bobcat Stadium; Bozeman, MT	Max Media/Big Sky TV	W 43–35	17,147
September 22	2:05 pm	Northern Colorado^{†}	No. 2	Bobcat Stadium; Bozeman, MT	Max Media/Big Sky TV	W 41–16	18,637
September 29	1:35 pm	at Southern Utah	No. 2	Eccles Coliseum; Cedar City, UT	RTNW	W 24–17	8,417
October 6	5:05 pm	at UC Davis	No. 2	Aggie Stadium; Davis, CA	RTNW	W 48–41	9,877
October 13	1:35 pm	No. 6 Eastern Washington	No. 2	Bobcat Stadium; Bozeman, MT	RTNW	L 24–27	20,477
October 27	2:05 pm	North Dakota	No. 4	Bobcat Stadium; Bozeman, MT	Max Media/Big Sky TV	W 55–10	17,137
November 3	5:05 pm	at Sacramento State	No. 3	Hornet Stadium; Sacramento, CA	RTNW	W 20–17	7,143
November 10	1:35 pm	Portland State	No. 2	Bobcat Stadium; Bozeman, MT	RTNW	W 65–30	15,177
November 17	1:35 pm	at Montana	No. 2	Washington–Grizzly Stadium; Missoula, MT (rivalry)	RTNW	W 16–7	26,210
December 1	5:00 pm	No. 10 Stony Brook*	No. 2	Bobcat Stadium; Bozeman, MT (NCAA Division I Second Round)	ESPN3	W 16–10	15,257
December 7	6:00 pm	No. 5 Sam Houston State*	No. 2	Bobcat Stadium; Bozeman, MT (NCAA Division I Quarterfinal)	ESPN2	L 16–34	16,417
*Non-conference game; ^{†}Homecoming; Rankings from The Sports Network Poll released prior to the game; All times are in Mountain time

== Game summaries ==
=== Chadron State ===
	1	2	3	4	Total
Eagles	3	0	3	0	6
#4 Bobcats	6	13	7	7	33

=== @ Drake ===
	1	2	3	4	Total
#4 Bobcats	7	7	7	13	34
Bulldogs	0	17	7	0	24

=== Stephen F. Austin ===
	1	2	3	4	Total
#23 Lumberjacks	10	10	3	12	35
#3 Bobcats	14	7	7	15	43

=== Northern Colorado ===
	1	2	3	4	Total
Bears	0	13	3	0	16
#2 Bobcats	21	10	7	3	41

=== @ Southern Utah ===
	1	2	3	4	Total
#2 Bobcats	7	7	3	7	24
Thunderbirds	0	7	0	10	17

=== @ UC Davis ===
	1	2	3	4	Total
#2 Bobcats	7	24	0	17	48
Aggies	14	0	24	3	41

=== Eastern Washington ===
	1	2	3	4	Total
#6 Eagles	0	3	10	14	27
#2 Bobcats	0	10	7	7	24

=== North Dakota ===
	1	2	3	4	Total
North Dakota	7	0	3	0	10
#4 Bobcats	14	14	7	20	55

=== @ Sacramento State ===
	1	2	3	4	Total
#3 Bobcats	7	3	3	7	20
Hornets	3	7	7	0	17

=== Portland State ===
	1	2	3	4	Total
Vikings	7	3	10	10	30
#2 Bobcats	24	35	6	0	65

=== @ Montana ===
	1	2	3	4	Total
#2 Bobcats	3	7	3	3	16
Grizzlies	7	0	0	0	7

== FCS Playoffs ==
=== Stony Brook–FCS Playoffs Second Round ===
	1	2	3	4	Total
#10 Seawolves	0	3	0	7	10
#2 Bobcats	7	3	3	3	16

=== Sam Houston State–FCS Playoffs Quarterfinals ===
	1	2	3	4	Total
#5 Bearkats	3	17	7	7	34
#2 Bobcats	3	0	6	7	16

This is the second straight year the Bobcats and Bearkats have met in the FCS quarterfinals. Last years game was in Huntsville, Texas.

== Ranking movements ==
Ranking movements Legend: ██ Increase in ranking ██ Decrease in ranking
	Week																
Poll	Pre	1	2	3	4	5	6	7	8	9	10	11	12	13	14	15	Final
Sports Network	4	4	3	2	2	2	2	5	4	3	2	2	2				
Coaches	4	4	3	2	2	2	2	5	4	3	2	2	2				
