= 2012 Northern Arizona Lumberjacks football team =

American college football season

2012 Northern Arizona Lumberjacks football
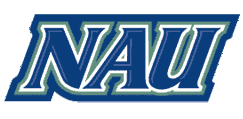
- Conference: Big Sky Conference

Ranking
- Sports Network: No. 20
- FCS Coaches: No. 15
- Record: 8–3 (6–2 Big Sky)
- Head coach: Jerome Souers (15th season)
- Defensive coordinator: Andy Thompson
- Home stadium: Walkup Skydome

2012 Big Sky Conference football standings
	Conf.			Overall
Team	W		L	W		L
No. 4 Eastern Washington +^	7	–	1	11	–	3
No. 5 Montana State +^	7	–	1	11	–	2
No. 12 Cal Poly +^	7	–	1	9	–	3
No. 20 Northern Arizona	6	–	2	8	–	3
Sacramento State	4	–	4	6	–	5
Northern Colorado	4	–	4	5	–	6
Southern Utah	4	–	4	5	–	6
North Dakota	3	–	5	5	–	6
Montana	3	–	5	5	–	6
UC Davis	3	–	5	4	–	7
Portland State	2	–	6	3	–	8
Weber State	2	–	6	2	–	9
Idaho State	0	–	8	1	–	10
$ – Conference champion; ^ – FCS playoff participant; Rankings from The Sports Network poll

The 2012 Northern Arizona Lumberjacks football team represented Northern Arizona University in the 2012 NCAA Division I FCS football season. They were led by 15th-year head coach Jerome Souers and played their home games at the Walkup Skydome. They are a member of the Big Sky Conference. They finished the season 8–3, 6–2 in the Big Sky to finish in fourth place.

== Schedule ==
Date	Time	Opponent	Rank	Site	TV	Result	Attendance
August 30	8:30 pm	at Arizona State*		Sun Devil Stadium; Tempe, AZ	PAC-12 Networks	L 6–63	48,658
September 8	8:00 pm	at UNLV*		Sam Boyd Stadium; Whitney, NV		W 17–14	15,257
September 15	4:00 pm	Fort Lewis*		Walkup Skydome; Flagstaff, AZ	NAU-TV/FSAZ+/FCSP/Big Sky TV	W 69–0	6,594
September 22	12:30 pm	at No. 14 Montana		Washington–Grizzly Stadium; Missoula, MT	RTRM/RTNW/Audience Network	W 41–21	25,254
September 29	2:00 pm	Portland State	No. 22	Walkup Skydome; Flagstaff, AZ	FSAZ+/NAU-TV/FCSP/Big Sky TV	W 24–10	9,107
October 13	1:00 pm	at North Dakota	No. 16	Alerus Center; Grand Forks, ND	Midco Sports Net/Big Sky TV	W 45–38	9,742
October 20	4:00 pm	UC Davis^{†}	No. 16	Walkup Skydome; Flagstaff, AZ	FSAZ+/Big Sky TV	W 21–7	7,991
October 27	12:30 pm	at Northern Colorado	No. 13	Nottingham Field; Greeley, CO	Big Sky TV	W 12–10	3,780
November 3	3:00 pm	at Idaho State	No. 12	Holt Arena; Pocatello, ID	Big Sky TV	W 50–10	5,144
November 10	4:00 pm	Southern Utah	No. 11	Walkup Skydome; Flagstaff, AZ (Grand Canyon Rivalry)	FSAZ+/Big Sky TV	L 29–35 ^{3OT}	4,125
November 17	4:00 pm	No. 17 Cal Poly	No. 15	Walkup Skydome; Flagstaff, AZ	FSAZ+/Big Sky TV	L 34–42	6,119
*Non-conference game; ^{†}Homecoming; Rankings from The Sports Network Poll released prior to the game; All times are in Mountain time

== Game summaries ==
=== @ Arizona State ===
	1	2	3	4	Total
Lumberjacks	0	0	6	0	6
Sun Devils	14	28	7	14	63

=== @ UNLV ===
	1	2	3	4	Total
Lumberjacks	0	0	7	10	17
Rebels	7	7	0	0	14

=== Fort Lewis ===
	1	2	3	4	Total
Skyhawks	0	0	0	0	0
Lumberjacks	27	21	14	7	69

=== @ Montana ===
	1	2	3	4	Total
Lumberjacks	7	7	13	14	41
#14 Grizzlies	17	7	0	7	31

=== Portland State ===
	1	2	3	4	Total
Vikings	3	0	7	0	10
#22 Lumberjacks	14	3	7	0	24

=== @ North Dakota ===
	1	2	3	4	Total
#16 Lumberjacks	14	3	14	14	45
North Dakota	0	17	14	7	38

=== UC Davis ===
	1	2	3	4	Total
Aggies	0	0	0	7	7
#16 Lumberjacks	0	7	14	0	21

=== @ Northern Colorado ===
	1	2	3	4	Total
#13 Lumberjacks	2	7	0	3	12
Bears	0	3	0	7	10

=== @ Idaho State ===
	1	2	3	4	Total
#12 Lumberjacks	12	14	7	17	50
Bengals	7	3	0	0	10

=== Southern Utah ===
	1	2	3	4	OT	2OT	3OT	Total
Thunderbirds	9	3	0	3	7	7	6	35
#11 Lumberjacks	0	0	7	8	7	7	0	29

=== Cal Poly ===
	1	2	3	4	Total
#17 Mustangs	14	7	14	7	42
#15 Lumberjacks	7	6	7	14	34
