= 2012 Eastern Washington Eagles football team =

American college football season

2012 Eastern Washington Eagles football

Big Sky co-champion

FCS Playoffs Semifinals, L 42–45 vs. Sam Houston State
- Conference: Big Sky Conference

Ranking
- Sports Network: No. 4
- FCS Coaches: No. 4
- Record: 11–3 (7–1 Big Sky)
- Head coach: Beau Baldwin (5th season)
- Offensive coordinator: Aaron Best (5th season)
- Defensive coordinator: John Graham (5th season)
- Home stadium: Roos Field

2012 Big Sky Conference football standings
	Conf.			Overall
Team	W		L	W		L
No. 4 Eastern Washington +^	7	–	1	11	–	3
No. 5 Montana State +^	7	–	1	11	–	2
No. 12 Cal Poly +^	7	–	1	9	–	3
No. 20 Northern Arizona	6	–	2	8	–	3
Sacramento State	4	–	4	6	–	5
Northern Colorado	4	–	4	5	–	6
Southern Utah	4	–	4	5	–	6
North Dakota	3	–	5	5	–	6
Montana	3	–	5	5	–	6
UC Davis	3	–	5	4	–	7
Portland State	2	–	6	3	–	8
Weber State	2	–	6	2	–	9
Idaho State	0	–	8	1	–	10
$ – Conference champion; ^ – FCS playoff participant; Rankings from The Sports Network poll

The 2012 Eastern Washington Eagles football team represented Eastern Washington University in the 2012 NCAA Division I FCS football season. The team was coached by Beau Baldwin, who was in his fifth season with Eastern Washington. The Eagles played their home games at Roos Field in Cheney, Washington and were a member of the Big Sky Conference. They finished the season 11–3, 7–1 in Big Sky play to share the conference championship with Cal Poly and Montana State. They received the Big Sky's automatic bid into the FCS Playoffs where they defeated Wagner in the second round and Illinois State in the quarterfinals before falling in the semifinals to Sam Houston State.

== Schedule ==
Date	Time	Opponent	Rank	Site	TV	Result	Attendance
August 30	6:00 pm	at Idaho*	No. 12	Kibbie Dome; Moscow, ID	ESPN3	W 20–3	11,136
September 8	12:00 pm	at Washington State*	No. 9	Martin Stadium; Pullman, WA	P12N	L 20–24	33,598
September 22	5:05 pm	at Weber State	No. 9	Stewart Stadium; Ogden, UT	Big Sky TV	W 32–26	9,434
September 29	4:05 pm	No. 21 Montana	No. 7	Roos Field; Cheney, WA (EWU–UM Governors Cup)	RTNW	W 32–26	10,529
October 6	5:05 pm	North Dakota	No. 7	Roos Field; Cheney, WA	SWX/Big Sky TV	W 55–17	8,646
October 13	12:35 pm	at No. 2 Montana State	No. 6	Bobcat Stadium; Bozeman, MT	RTNW	W 27–24	20,477
October 20	4:05 pm	Sacramento State^{†}	No. 1	Roos Field; Cheney, WA	SWX/Big Sky TV	W 31–28	8,714
October 27	12:00 pm	at Southern Utah	No. 1	Eccles Coliseum; Cedar City, UT	Big Sky TV	L 27–30	3,344
November 3	1:35 pm	No. 16 Cal Poly*	No. 7	Roos Field; Cheney, WA	Big Sky TV	W 34–17	8,644
November 10	1:35 pm	UC Davis	No. 5	Roos Field; Cheney, WA	SWX/Big Sky TV	W 31–28	6,011
November 17	1:05 pm	at Portland State	No. 5	Jeld-Wen Field; Portland, OR (The Dam Cup)	CSNNW/Big Sky TV	W 41–34	5,758
December 1	3:00 pm	Wagner*	No. 4	Roos Field; Cheney, WA (NCAA Division I Second Round)	ESPN3	W 29–19	7,039
December 8	3:00 pm	No. 16 Illinois State*	No. 4	Roos Field; Cheney, WA (NCAA Division I Quarterfinal)	ESPN3	W 51–35	7,512
December 15	1:00 pm	No. 5 Sam Houston State*	No. 4	Roos Field; Cheney, WA (NCAA Division I Semifinal)	ESPNU	L 42–45	7,615
*Non-conference game; ^{†}Homecoming; Rankings from The Sports Network Poll released prior to the game; All times are in Pacific time

Despite also being a member of the Big Sky, the game against Cal Poly on November 3 was considered a non conference game and had no effect on the Big Sky standings.

== Game summaries ==
=== @ Idaho ===
	1	2	3	4	Total
#12 Eagles	3	7	3	7	20
Vandals	3	0	0	0	3

=== @ Washington State ===
	1	2	3	4	Total
#9 Eagles	7	7	0	6	20
Cougars	14	10	0	0	24

=== @ Weber State ===
	1	2	3	4	Total
#9 Eagles	10	10	9	3	32
Wildcats	0	3	16	7	26

=== Montana ===
	1	2	3	4	Total
#21 Grizzlies	7	3	13	3	26
#7 Eagles	7	10	0	15	32

=== North Dakota ===
	1	2	3	4	Total
North Dakota	10	7	0	0	17
#7 Eagles	20	14	14	7	55

=== @ Montana State ===
	1	2	3	4	Total
#6 Eagles	0	3	10	14	27
#2 Bobcats	0	10	7	7	24

=== Sacramento State ===
	1	2	3	4	Total
Hornets	7	0	7	14	28
#1 Eagles	3	10	11	7	31

=== @ Southern Utah ===
	1	2	3	4	Total
#1 Eagles	7	6	14	0	27
Thunderbirds	7	6	7	10	30

=== Cal Poly ===
	1	2	3	4	Total
#16 Mustangs	3	7	0	7	17
#7 Eagles	14	10	7	3	34

=== UC Davis ===
	1	2	3	4	Total
Aggies	3	22	3	0	28
#5 Eagles	14	0	10	7	31

=== @ Portland State ===
	1	2	3	4	Total
#5 Eagles	0	14	13	14	41
Vikings	13	0	13	8	34

== FCS Playoffs ==
=== Wagner–FCS Playoffs Second Round ===
	1	2	3	4	Total
Seahawks	0	6	13	0	19
#4 Eagles	0	14	8	7	29

=== Illinois State–FCS Quarterfinals ===
	1	2	3	4	Total
#16 Redbirds	10	7	10	8	35
#4 Eagles	10	14	14	13	51

=== Sam Houston State–FCS Semifinals ===
	1	2	3	4	Total
#5 Bearkats	14	21	0	10	45
#4 Eagles	0	0	21	21	42

Only previous meeting was in the 2004 FCS Playoffs quarterfinals.

== Ranking movements ==
Ranking movements Legend: ██ Increase in ranking ██ Decrease in ranking ( ) = First-place votes
	Week																
Poll	Pre	1	2	3	4	5	6	7	8	9	10	11	12	13	14	15	Final
Sports Network	12	9	10	9	7	7	6	1 (92)	1 (125)	7	5	5	4				
Coaches	15	11	11	9	7	7	6	1 (11)	1 (22)	8 (1)	6	5	4				
