= 2012 Portland State Vikings football team =

American college football season

2012 Portland State Vikings football
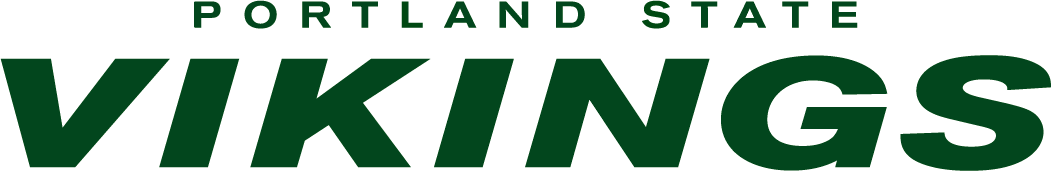
- Conference: Big Sky Conference
- Record: 3–8 (2–6 Big Sky)
- Head coach: Nigel Burton (3rd season)
- Offensive coordinator: Bruce Barnum (3rd season)
- Offensive scheme: Pistol
- Defensive coordinator: Eric Jackson (3rd season)
- Base defense: 4–3
- Home stadium: Jeld-Wen Field

2012 Big Sky Conference football standings
	Conf.			Overall
Team	W		L	W		L
No. 4 Eastern Washington +^	7	–	1	11	–	3
No. 5 Montana State +^	7	–	1	11	–	2
No. 12 Cal Poly +^	7	–	1	9	–	3
No. 20 Northern Arizona	6	–	2	8	–	3
Sacramento State	4	–	4	6	–	5
Northern Colorado	4	–	4	5	–	6
Southern Utah	4	–	4	5	–	6
North Dakota	3	–	5	5	–	6
Montana	3	–	5	5	–	6
UC Davis	3	–	5	4	–	7
Portland State	2	–	6	3	–	8
Weber State	2	–	6	2	–	9
Idaho State	0	–	8	1	–	10
$ – Conference champion; ^ – FCS playoff participant; Rankings from The Sports Network poll

The 2012 Portland State Vikings football team represented Portland State University in the 2012 NCAA Division I FCS football season.

They were led by third year head coach Nigel Burton and played their home games at Jeld-Wen Field. They are a member of the Big Sky Conference. They finished the season 3–8, 2–6 in Big Sky play to finish in a tie for 11th place with Weber State.

== Schedule ==
Date	Time	Opponent	Site	TV	Result	Attendance
September 1	5:00 pm	No. 2 (NAIA) Carroll (MT)*	Jeld-Wen Field; Portland, OR	CSNNW/Big Sky TV	W 38–20	6,845
September 8	4:00 pm	at North Dakota*	Alerus Center; Grand Forks, ND	MSN/Big Sky TV	L 37–45	9,210
September 15	4:00 pm	at Washington*	CenturyLink Field; Seattle, WA	FX	L 13–52	54,922
September 22	5:00 pm	Southern Utah	Jeld-Wen Field; Portland, OR	CSNNW/Big Sky TV	L 42–49	6,353
September 29	2:00 pm	at No. 22 Northern Arizona	Walkup Skydome; Flagstaff, AZ	FCSP/Big Sky TV	L 10–24	9,107
October 6	5:00 pm	Idaho State	Jeld-Wen Field; Portland, OR	CSNNW/Big Sky TV	W 77–10	5,754
October 20	6:00 pm	at No. 14 Cal Poly	Alex G. Spanos Stadium; San Luis Obispo, CA	Big Sky TV	L 25–37	10,025
October 27	2:00 pm	at UC Davis	Aggie Stadium; Davis, CA	Big Sky TV	W 49–21	7,826
November 3	1:00 pm	Northern Colorado	Jeld-Wen Field; Portland, OR	Big Sky TV	L 28–32	5,077
November 10	12:30 pm	at No. 2 Montana State	Bobcat Stadium; Bozeman, MT	RTNW	L 30–65	15,177
November 17	1:00 pm	No. 5 Eastern Washington	Jeld-Wen Field; Portland, OR (The Dam Cup)	CSNNW/Big Sky TV	L 34–41	5,758
*Non-conference game; Rankings from The Sports Network Poll released prior to the game; All times are in Pacific time

Despite also being a member of the Big Sky Conference, the game with North Dakota on September 8 was considered a non conference game and had no effect on the Big Sky Standings.

== Game summaries ==
=== Carroll ===
	1	2	3	4	Total
Fighting Saints	9	3	0	8	20
Vikings	14	7	0	17	38

=== @ North Dakota ===
	1	2	3	4	Total
Vikings	9	15	0	13	37
North Dakota	14	21	10	0	45

=== @ Washington ===
	1	2	3	4	Total
Vikings	0	0	6	7	13
Huskies	14	31	7	0	52

=== Southern Utah ===
	1	2	3	4	Total
Thunderbirds	3	17	15	14	49
Vikings	21	7	14	0	42

=== @ Northern Arizona ===
	1	2	3	4	Total
Vikings	3	0	7	0	10
#22 Lumberjacks	14	3	7	0	24

=== Idaho State ===
	1	2	3	4	Total
Bengals	0	10	0	0	10
Vikings	7	28	28	14	77

=== @ Cal Poly ===
	1	2	3	4	Total
Vikings	14	3	8	0	25
#14 Mustangs	14	3	6	14	37

=== @ UC Davis ===
	1	2	3	4	Total
Vikings	7	7	14	21	49
Aggies	7	7	0	7	21

=== Northern Colorado ===
	1	2	3	4	Total
Bears	3	7	15	7	32
Vikings	6	15	7	0	28

=== @ Montana State ===
	1	2	3	4	Total
Vikings	7	3	10	10	30
#2 Bobcats	24	35	6	0	65

=== Eastern Washington ===
	1	2	3	4	Total
#5 Eagles	0	14	13	14	41
Vikings	13	0	13	8	34
