= 2012 Idaho State Bengals football team =

American college football season

2012 Idaho State Bengals football
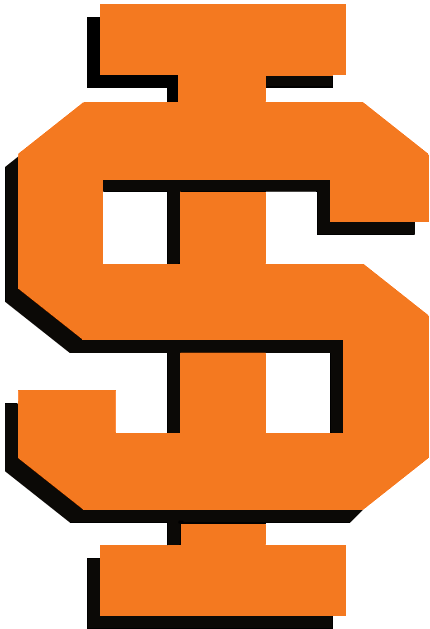
- Conference: Big Sky Conference
- Record: 1–10 (0–8 Big Sky)
- Head coach: Mike Kramer (2nd season)
- Offensive coordinator: Don Bailey (2nd season)
- Offensive scheme: Spread
- Co-defensive coordinators: Roger Cooper (1st season); Spencer Toone (1st season)
- Base defense: 3–4
- Home stadium: Holt Arena

2012 Big Sky Conference football standings
	Conf.			Overall
Team	W		L	W		L
No. 4 Eastern Washington +^	7	–	1	11	–	3
No. 5 Montana State +^	7	–	1	11	–	2
No. 12 Cal Poly +^	7	–	1	9	–	3
No. 20 Northern Arizona	6	–	2	8	–	3
Sacramento State	4	–	4	6	–	5
Northern Colorado	4	–	4	5	–	6
Southern Utah	4	–	4	5	–	6
North Dakota	3	–	5	5	–	6
Montana	3	–	5	5	–	6
UC Davis	3	–	5	4	–	7
Portland State	2	–	6	3	–	8
Weber State	2	–	6	2	–	9
Idaho State	0	–	8	1	–	10
$ – Conference champion; ^ – FCS playoff participant; Rankings from The Sports Network poll

The 2012 Idaho State Bengals football team represented Idaho State University as a member of the Big Sky Conference during the 2012 NCAA Division I FCS football season. Led by second-year head coach Mike Kramer, the Bengals compiled an overall record of 1–10 with a mark of 0–8 in conference play, placing last out of nine teams in the Big Sky. Idaho State played their home games at Holt Arena in Pocatello, Idaho.

== Schedule ==
Date	Time	Opponent	Site	TV	Result	Attendance
September 1	12:00 pm	at Air Force*	Falcon Stadium; Colorado Springs, CO		L 21–49	35,282
September 8	4:00 pm	Black Hills State*	Holt Arena; Pocatello, ID	Big Sky TV	W 38–5	6,228
September 22	1:30 pm	at No. 22 (FBS) Nebraska*	Memorial Stadium; Lincoln, NE	BTN	L 7–73	84,923
September 29	1:30 pm	Sacramento State	Holt Arena; Pocatello, ID	Big Sky TV	L 31–54	7,882
October 6	6:05 pm	at Portland State	Jeld-Wen Field; Portland, OR	CSNNW/Big Sky TV	L 10–77	5,754
October 13	4:00 pm	UC Davis	Holt Arena; Pocatello, ID	Big Sky TV	L 45–52	5,212
October 20	1:30 pm	at Northern Colorado	Nottingham Field; Greeley, CO	Big Sky TV	L 14–52	4,155
October 27	1:30 pm	at Montana	Washington–Grizzly Stadium; Missoula, MT	RTNW	L 24–70	24,152
November 3	4:00 pm	No. 12 Northern Arizona	Holt Arena; Pocatello, ID	Big Sky TV	L 10–50	5,144
November 10	7:00 pm	at No. 19 Cal Poly	Alex G. Spanos Stadium; San Luis Obispo, CA	Big Sky TV	L 14–70	6,326
November 17	4:00 pm	Weber State	Holt Arena; Pocatello, ID	Big Sky TV	L 14–40	5,125
*Non-conference game; Rankings from The Sports Network Poll released prior to the game; All times are in Mountain time

== Game summaries ==
=== @ Air Force ===
	1	2	3	4	Total
Bengals	0	0	14	7	21
Falcons	7	21	14	7	49

=== Black Hills State ===
	1	2	3	4	Total
Yellow Jackets	2	3	0	0	5
Bengals	7	14	10	7	38

=== @ Nebraska ===
	1	2	3	4	Total
Bengals	0	0	0	7	7
#22 Cornhuskers	35	10	21	7	73

=== Sacramento State ===
	1	2	3	4	Total
Hornets	14	13	7	20	54
Bengals	14	9	0	8	31

=== @ Portland State ===
	1	2	3	4	Total
Bengals	0	10	0	0	10
Vikings	7	28	28	14	77

=== UC Davis ===
	1	2	3	4	Total
Aggies	10	14	14	14	52
Bengals	14	3	14	14	45

=== @ Northern Colorado ===
	1	2	3	4	Total
Bengals	0	7	0	7	14
Bears	14	14	24	0	52

=== @ Montana ===
	1	2	3	4	Total
Bengals	3	7	7	7	24
Grizzlies	21	21	21	7	70

=== Northern Arizona ===
	1	2	3	4	Total
#12 Lumberjacks	12	14	7	17	50
Bengals	7	3	0	0	10

=== @ Cal Poly ===
	1	2	3	4	Total
Bengals	0	7	7	0	14
#19 Mustangs	28	14	14	14	70

=== Weber State ===
	1	2	3	4	Total
Wildcats	16	11	0	13	40
Bengals	0	0	14	0	14
