= 2012 Montana Grizzlies football team =

American college football season

2012 Montana Grizzlies football
- Conference: Big Sky Conference
- Record: 5–6 (3–5 Big Sky)
- Head coach: Mick Delaney (1st season)
- Offensive coordinator: Timm Rosenbach (1st season)
- Defensive coordinator: Ty Gregorak (1st season)
- Home stadium: Washington–Grizzly Stadium

2012 Big Sky Conference football standings
	Conf.			Overall
Team	W		L	W		L
No. 4 Eastern Washington +^	7	–	1	11	–	3
No. 5 Montana State +^	7	–	1	11	–	2
No. 12 Cal Poly +^	7	–	1	9	–	3
No. 20 Northern Arizona	6	–	2	8	–	3
Sacramento State	4	–	4	6	–	5
Northern Colorado	4	–	4	5	–	6
Southern Utah	4	–	4	5	–	6
North Dakota	3	–	5	5	–	6
Montana	3	–	5	5	–	6
UC Davis	3	–	5	4	–	7
Portland State	2	–	6	3	–	8
Weber State	2	–	6	2	–	9
Idaho State	0	–	8	1	–	10
$ – Conference champion; ^ – FCS playoff participant; Rankings from The Sports Network poll

The 2012 Montana Grizzlies football team represented the University of Montana in the 2012 NCAA Division I FCS football season. The Grizzlies were led by first-year head coach Mick Delaney and played their home games on campus at Washington–Grizzly Stadium. Montana is a charter member of the Big Sky Conference.

Previous head coach Robin Pflugrad was fired in March by university president Royce Engstrom before starting his third season.

The Grizzlies finished the season 5–6, 3–5 in Big Sky play to finish in a three-way tie for eighth place.

== Schedule ==
Date	Time	Opponent	Rank	Site	TV	Result	Attendance
September 1	1:30 pm	South Dakota*	No. 11	Washington–Grizzly Stadium; Missoula, MT	Max Media/Big Sky TV/KDLT	W 35–24	25,126
September 8	4:30 pm	at No. 11 Appalachian State*	No. 12	Kidd Brewer Stadium; Boone, NC	ESPN3	L 27–35	30,856
September 15	1:30 pm	Liberty*	No. 14	Washington–Grizzly Stadium; Missoula, MT	Altitude/MASN	W 34–14	24,991
September 22	1:30 pm	Northern Arizona^{†}	No. 14	Washington–Grizzly Stadium; Missoula, MT	RTNW/Audience Network	L 31–41	25,254
September 29	5:00 pm	at No. 7 Eastern Washington	No. 21	Roos Field; Cheney, WA (Governors Cup)	RTNW/Audience Network	L 26–32	10,529
October 6	1:30 pm	at Northern Colorado		Nottingham Field; Greeley, CO	RTNW/Audience Network	W 40–17	4,751
October 13	1:30 pm	Southern Utah		Washington–Grizzly Stadium; Missoula, MT	Max Media/Big Sky TV	L 20–30	25,684
October 20	1:30 pm	at North Dakota		Alerus Center; Grand Forks, ND	RTNW/Audience Network	L 34–40	9,000
October 27	1:30 pm	Idaho State		Washington–Grizzly Stadium; Missoula, MT	RTNW/Audience Network	W 70–24	24,152
November 3	1:30 pm	at Weber State		Stewart Stadium; Ogden, UT	RTNW/Audience Network	W 24–21	7,251
November 17	1:30 pm	No. 2 Montana State		Washington–Grizzly Stadium; Missoula, MT (Brawl of the Wild)	RTNW/Audience Network	L 7–16	26,210
*Non-conference game; ^{†}Homecoming; Rankings from The Sports Network Poll released prior to the game; All times are in Mountain time

== Game summaries ==
Final score source

=== South Dakota ===
	1	2	3	4	Total
Coyotes	0	10	14	0	24
#11 Grizzlies	3	13	19	0	35

=== Appalachian State ===
	1	2	3	4	Total
#12 Grizzlies	7	14	0	6	27
#11 Mountaineers	21	0	0	14	35

First ever regular season meeting. Previous two meetings came in the playoff semifinals in 2000 and 2009.

=== Liberty ===
	1	2	3	4	Total
Flames	0	0	7	7	14
#14 Grizzlies	7	17	0	10	34

=== Northern Arizona ===
	1	2	3	4	Total
Lumberjacks	7	7	13	14	41
#14 Grizzlies	17	7	0	7	31

=== Eastern Washington ===
	1	2	3	4	Total
#21 Grizzlies	7	3	13	3	26
#7 Eagles	7	10	0	15	32

=== Northern Colorado ===
	1	2	3	4	Total
Grizzlies	0	10	14	16	40
Bears	0	0	10	7	17

=== Southern Utah ===
	1	2	3	4	Total
Thunderbirds	6	7	7	10	30
Grizzlies	7	10	0	3	20

=== North Dakota ===
	1	2	3	4	Total
Grizzlies	7	10	17	0	34
North Dakota	17	14	0	9	40

=== Idaho State ===
	1	2	3	4	Total
Bengals	3	7	7	7	24
Grizzlies	21	21	21	7	70

=== Weber State ===
	1	2	3	4	Total
Grizzlies	3	7	3	11	24
Wildcats	0	7	7	7	21

=== Montana State ===
	1	2	3	4	Total
#2 Bobcats	3	7	3	3	16
Grizzlies	7	0	0	0	7

== Rankings ==
Ranking movements Legend: ██ Increase in ranking ██ Decrease in ranking RV = Received votes
	Week													
Poll	Pre	1	2	3	4	5	6	7	8	9	10	11	12	Final
The Sports Network	11	12	14	14	21	RV	RV							
FCS Coaches	10	9	12	11	20	RV	RV							
