= 2012 NCAA Division I FCS football season =

American college football season

2012 NCAA Division I FCS season

Regular season
- Number of teams: 122
- Duration: August – November
- Payton Award: Taylor Heinicke, Old Dominion
- Buchanan Award: Caleb Schreibeis, Montana State

Playoff
- Duration: November 24 – December 15
- Championship date: January 5, 2013
- Championship site: FC Dallas Stadium, Frisco, TX
- Champion: North Dakota State

NCAA Division I FCS football seasons
- «2011 2013»

The 2012 NCAA Division I FCS football season, part of college football in the United States, was organized by the National Collegiate Athletic Association (NCAA) at the Division I Football Championship Subdivision (FCS) level. The season began on August 30, 2012, and concluded with the 2013 NCAA Division I Football Championship Game on January 5, 2013, at FC Dallas Stadium in Frisco, Texas. North Dakota State beat Sam Houston State for the second year in a row, 39-13, to repeat as champions.

== Conference changes and new programs ==
The Great West Conference dropped football after the 2011 season.

No teams played as independents in 2012, for the first time in the history of Division I-AA/FCS.

School	2011 Conference	2012 Conference
Cal Poly	Great West	Big Sky
Georgia State	FCS Independent	CAA
Massachusetts	CAA (FCS)	MAC (FBS)
North Dakota	Great West	Big Sky
South Alabama	FCS Independent	Sun Belt (FBS)
South Dakota	Great West	MVFC
Southern Utah	Great West	Big Sky
Texas State	FCS Independent	WAC (FBS)
UC Davis	Great West	Big Sky
UTSA	FCS Independent	WAC (FBS)

== FCS team wins over FBS teams ==
August 30: Eastern Washington 20, Idaho 3
August 30: McNeese State 27, Middle Tennessee 21
September 1: Tennessee–Martin 20, Memphis 17
September 1: Youngstown State 31, Pittsburgh 17
September 8: Illinois State 31, Eastern Michigan 14
September 8: North Dakota State 22, Colorado State 7
September 8: Northern Arizona 17, UNLV 14
September 8: Sacramento State 30, Colorado 28
September 15: Cal Poly 24, Wyoming 22
September 29: Stony Brook 23, Army 3

== Conference standings ==
2012 Big Sky Conference football standings
	Conf.			Overall
Team	W		L	W		L
No. 4 Eastern Washington +^	7	–	1	11	–	3
No. 5 Montana State +^	7	–	1	11	–	2
No. 12 Cal Poly +^	7	–	1	9	–	3
No. 20 Northern Arizona	6	–	2	8	–	3
Sacramento State	4	–	4	6	–	5
Northern Colorado	4	–	4	5	–	6
Southern Utah	4	–	4	5	–	6
North Dakota	3	–	5	5	–	6
Montana	3	–	5	5	–	6
UC Davis	3	–	5	4	–	7
Portland State	2	–	6	3	–	8
Weber State	2	–	6	2	–	9
Idaho State	0	–	8	1	–	10
$ – Conference champion; ^ – FCS playoff participant; Rankings from The Sports Network poll

2012 Big South Conference football standings
	Conf.			Overall
Team	W		L	W		L
No. 10 Stony Brook +^	5	–	1	10	–	3
Coastal Carolina +^	5	–	1	8	–	5
Liberty +	5	–	1	6	–	5
Charleston Southern	3	–	3	5	–	6
Gardner–Webb	2	–	4	3	–	8
VMI	1	–	5	2	–	9
Presbyterian	0	–	6	2	–	9
$ – Conference champion; ^ – FCS playoff participant; Rankings from The Sports Network poll

2012 Colonial Athletic Association football standings
	Conf.			Overall
Team	W		L	W		L
No. 6 Old Dominion ^	7	–	1	11	–	2
No. 18 Richmond +	6	–	2	8	–	3
No. 13 New Hampshire +^	6	–	2	8	–	4
No. 15 Villanova +^	6	–	2	8	–	4
No. 17 Towson +	6	–	2	7	–	4
No. 19 James Madison	5	–	3	7	–	4
Maine	4	–	4	5	–	6
Delaware	2	–	6	5	–	6
William & Mary	1	–	7	2	–	9
Rhode Island	0	–	8	0	–	11
Georgia State	0	–	0	1	–	10
+ – Conference co-champions; ^ – FCS playoff participant; Georgia State's conference record was 0–0, and it did not occupy a spot in the overall standings. Old Dominion was ineligible for the conference championship because of its announced departure for Conference USA in 2013.; Rankings from The Sports Network poll

2012 Ivy League football standings
	Conf.			Overall
Team	W		L	W		L
Penn $	6	–	1	6	–	4
Harvard	5	–	2	8	–	2
Brown	4	–	3	7	–	3
Dartmouth	4	–	3	6	–	4
Princeton	4	–	3	5	–	5
Cornell	2	–	5	4	–	6
Columbia	2	–	5	3	–	7
Yale	1	–	6	2	–	8
$ – Conference champion

2012 Mid-Eastern Athletic Conference football standings
	Conf.			Overall
Team	W		L	W		L
No. 22 Bethune–Cookman $^	8	–	0	9	–	3
Howard	6	–	2	7	–	4
North Carolina A&T	5	–	3	7	–	4
North Carolina Central	5	–	3	6	–	5
Delaware State	5	–	3	6	–	5
South Carolina State	4	–	4	5	–	6
Florida A&M	4	–	4	4	–	7
Hampton	3	–	5	3	–	7
Norfolk State	2	–	6	4	–	7
Morgan State	2	–	6	3	–	8
Savannah State	0	–	8	1	–	10
$ – Conference champion; ^ – FCS playoff participant; Rankings from The Sports Network poll

2012 Missouri Valley Football Conference standings
	Conf.			Overall
Team	W		L	W		L
No. 1 North Dakota State $^	7	–	1	14	–	1
No. 14 South Dakota State ^	6	–	2	9	–	4
No. 8 Illinois State ^	5	–	3	9	–	4
Indiana State	5	–	3	7	–	4
Southern Illinois	5	–	3	6	–	5
Youngstown State	4	–	4	7	–	4
Northern Iowa	4	–	4	5	–	6
Missouri State	3	–	5	3	–	8
Western Illinois	1	–	7	3	–	8
South Dakota	0	–	8	1	–	10
$ – Conference champion; ^ – FCS playoff participant; Rankings from The Sports Network poll

2012 Northeast Conference football standings
	Conf.			Overall
Team	W		L	W		L
No. 21 Wagner +^	7	–	1	9	–	4
Albany +	7	–	1	9	–	2
Monmouth	4	–	3	5	–	5
Saint Francis (PA)	4	–	4	5	–	6
Bryant	4	–	4	4	–	7
Robert Morris	3	–	5	4	–	7
Duquesne	3	–	5	5	–	6
Central Connecticut	2	–	5	2	–	8
Sacred Heart	1	–	7	2	–	9
+ – Conference co-champions; ^ – FCS playoff participant; Rankings from The Sports Network poll

2012 Ohio Valley Conference football standings
	Conf.			Overall
Team	W		L	W		L
Eastern Illinois $^	6	–	1	7	–	5
No. 22 Eastern Kentucky	6	–	2	8	–	3
UT Martin	6	–	2	8	–	3
Jacksonville State	5	–	3	6	–	5
Tennessee State	4	–	3	8	–	3
Murray State	4	–	4	5	–	6
Southeast Missouri State	2	–	6	3	–	8
Tennessee Tech	1	–	7	3	–	8
Austin Peay	1	–	7	2	–	9
$ – Conference champion; ^ – FCS playoff participant; Rankings from The Sports Network poll

2012 Patriot League football standings
	Conf.			Overall
Team	W		L	W		L
No. 24 Colgate $^	6	–	0	8	–	4
No. 13 Lehigh	5	–	1	10	–	1
Georgetown	2	–	4	5	–	6
Lafayette	2	–	4	5	–	6
Holy Cross	2	–	4	2	–	9
Bucknell	1	–	5	3	–	8
Fordham	0	–	0	6	–	5
$ – Conference champion; ^ – FCS playoff participant; Fordham was ineligible for conference title because they offered football scholarships while other Patriot League members did not.; Rankings from The Sports Network poll

2012 Pioneer Football League standings
	Conf.			Overall
Team	W		L	W		L
Butler +	7	–	1	8	–	3
Drake +	7	–	1	8	–	3
San Diego +	7	–	1	8	–	3
Jacksonville	5	–	3	7	–	4
Dayton	5	–	3	6	–	5
Marist	3	–	5	4	–	7
Morehead State	3	–	5	4	–	7
Davidson	2	–	6	2	–	9
Valparaiso	1	–	7	1	–	10
Campbell	0	–	8	1	–	10
+ – Conference co-champions

2012 Southern Conference football standings
	Conf.			Overall
Team	W		L	W		L
No. 6 Georgia Southern +^	6	–	2	10	–	4
No. 9 Wofford +^	6	–	2	9	–	4
No. 7 Appalachian State +^	6	–	2	8	–	4
The Citadel	5	–	3	7	–	4
Samford	5	–	3	7	–	4
Chattanooga	5	–	3	6	–	5
Furman	2	–	6	3	–	8
Elon	1	–	7	3	–	8
Western Carolina	0	–	8	1	–	10
+ – Conference co-champions; ^ – FCS playoff participant; Rankings from The Sports Network Poll

2012 Southland Conference football standings
	Conf.			Overall
Team	W		L	W		L
No. 10 Central Arkansas +^	6	–	1	9	–	3
No. 2 Sam Houston State +^	6	–	1	11	–	4
Southeastern Louisiana	5	–	2	5	–	6
McNeese State	4	–	3	7	–	4
Stephen F. Austin	4	–	3	5	–	6
Northwestern State	2	–	5	4	–	7
Lamar	1	–	6	4	–	8
Nicholls State	0	–	7	1	–	10
+ – Conference co-champions; ^ – FCS playoff participant; Rankings from The Sports Network poll

2012 Southwestern Athletic Conference football standings
	Conf.			Overall
Team	W		L	W		L
East Division
Jackson State xy	7	–	2	7	–	5
Alabama State	7	–	2	7	–	4
Alabama A&M	6	–	3	7	–	4
Mississippi Valley State	5	–	4	5	–	6
Alcorn State	4	–	5	4	–	7
West Division
Arkansas–Pine Bluff xy$	8	–	1	10	–	2
Prairie View A&M	3	–	6	3	–	8
Southern	3	–	6	4	–	7
Texas Southern *	2	–	7	2	–	9
Grambling State	0	–	9	1	–	10
Championship: Arkansas–Pine Bluff 24, Jackson State 21 ^{OT}
$ – Conference champion; x – Division champion/co-champions; y – Championship game participant; * – ineligible for postseason

== Conference summaries ==
=== Championship games ===
Conference	Champion	Runner-up	Score	Offensive Player of the Year	Defensive Player of the Year	Coach of the Year
SWAC	Arkansas–Pine Bluff	Jackson State	24–21	Rico Richardson (WR, Jackson State)	Brandon Thurmond (DT, Arkansas–Pine Bluff)	

=== Other conference winners ===
Note: Records are regular-season only, and do not include playoff games.

Conference	Champion	Record	Offensive Player of the Year	Defensive Player of the Year	Coach of the Year
Big Sky	Eastern Washington; Montana State; Cal Poly	9–2 (7–1); 10–1 (7–1); 9–2 (7–1)	DeNarius McGhee (Montana State)	Jody Owens (Montana State)	Beau Baldwin (Eastern Washington); Tim Walsh (Cal Poly)
Big South	Coastal Carolina; Liberty; Stony Brook	8–3 (5–1); 6–5 (5–1); 9–2 (5–1)	Miguel Maysonet (Stony Brook)	Quinn Backus (Coastal Carolina)	Joe Moglia (Coastal Carolina)
CAA	New Hampshire; Richmond; Villanova; Towson (Note: Old Dominion had the best conference record at 7–1, but was not eligible for the title because it announced its 2013 departure for Conference USA in May 2012. Under CAA bylaws, a school that announces its departure immediately becomes ineligible for conference championships.)	8–3 (6–2); 8–3 (6–2); 8–3 (6–2); 7–4 (6–2)	Taylor Heinicke (Old Dominion)	Stephon Robertson (James Madison)	Andy Talley (Villanova)
Ivy	Penn	6–4 (6–1)	Colton Chapple (Harvard)	Mike Catapano (Princeton)	
MEAC	Bethune-Cookman	9–2 (8–0)	Nick Elko (Delaware State)	Keith Pough (Howard)	Brian Jenkins (Bethune Cookman)
MVFC	North Dakota State	10–1 (7–1)	Matt Brown (Illinois State)	Marcus Williams (North Dakota State)	Craig Bohl (North Dakota State)
NEC	Wagner; Albany	9–2 (7–1)	Jordan Harris (Bryant)	Nolan Nearhoof (Robert Morris)	Walt Hameline (Wagner)
OVC	Eastern Illinois	7–4 (6–1)	Erik Lora (Eastern Illinois)	Blake Peiffer (Southeast Missouri State)	Dino Babers (Eastern Illinois)
Patriot	Colgate	8–3 (6–0)	Gavin McCarney (Colgate)	Robert McCabe (Georgetown)	Dick Biddle (Colgate)
Pioneer	Butler; Drake	8–3 (7–1)	Matt Lancaster (Butler)	Tyler Moorehead (Drake)	Jeff Voris (Butler)
Southern	Georgia Southern; Appalachian State; Wofford	8–3 (6–2)	Eric Breitenstein (Wofford)	Jeremy Kimbrough (Appalachian State); Davis Tull (Chattanooga)	Kevin Higgins (The Citadel); Pat Sullivan (Samford)
Southland	Central Arkansas; Sam Houston State	9–2 (6–1); 8–3 (6–1)	Wynrick Smothers (Central Arkansas)	Darnell Taylor (Sam Houston State)	Clint Conque (Central Arkansas)

== Playoff qualifiers ==
=== Automatic berths for conference champions ===
- Big Sky Conference – Eastern Washington
- Big South Conference – Coastal Carolina
- Colonial Athletic Association – Villanova
- Mid-Eastern Athletic Conference – Bethune-Cookman
- Missouri Valley Football Conference – North Dakota State
- Northeast Conference – Wagner
- Ohio Valley Conference – Eastern Illinois
- Patriot League – Colgate
- Southern Conference – Georgia Southern
- Southland Conference – Central Arkansas

=== At large qualifiers ===
- Big Sky Conference - Montana State and Cal Poly
- Big South Conference - Stony Brook
- Colonial Athletic Association - New Hampshire and Old Dominion
- Missouri Valley Football Conference - Illinois State and South Dakota State
- Southern Conference - Wofford and Appalachian State
- Southland Conference - Sam Houston State

=== Abstains ===
- Ivy League – Penn
- Southwestern Athletic Conference – Arkansas–Pine Bluff

== Postseason ==
=== NCAA Division I playoff bracket ===
First Round
November 24
Campus sites

Second Round
December 1
Campus sites

Quarterfinals
December 7 and December 8
Campus sites

Semifinals
December 14 and December 15
Campus sites

National Championship Game

January 5
FC Dallas Stadium,
Frisco, Texas
ESPN2
Dial Global Sports

South Dakota State
3

Eastern Illinois
10

1
North Dakota State*
28

South Dakota State*
58

1
North Dakota State*
14

Wofford
7

New Hampshire
7

Wofford*
23

1
North Dakota State*
23

5
Georgia Southern
20

Coastal Carolina
35

Coastal Carolina
24

4
Old Dominion*
63

Bethune-Cookman*
14

4
Old Dominion*
35

5
Georgia Southern
49

Central Arkansas
16

5
Georgia Southern*
24

1
North Dakota State*
39

Sam Houston State
13

Wagner
19

Colgate
20

2
Eastern Washington*
29

Wagner*
31

2
Eastern Washington*
51

Illinois State
35

Illinois State
^{†}38

Appalachian State*
37

2
Eastern Washington*
42

Sam Houston State
45

Stony Brook
10

Villanova
10

3
Montana State*
16

Stony Brook*
20

3
Montana State*
16

Sam Houston State
34

Cal Poly
16

Sam Houston State*
18

* Home team † Overtime

== Coaching changes ==
=== Preseason and in-season ===
This is restricted to coaching changes that took place on or after May 1, 2012. For coaching changes that occurred earlier in 2012, see 2011 NCAA Division I FCS end-of-season coaching changes.

School	Outgoing coach	Date	Reason	Replacement
Southern	Stump Mitchell	September 17	Fired	Dawson Odums (interim)
Davidson	Tripp Merritt	November 5	Fired	Brett Hayford (interim)
Florida A&M	Joe Taylor	November 7	Retired	Earl Holmes (interim)

=== End of season ===
School	Outgoing coach	Date announced	Reason	Replacement
Georgia State	Bill Curry	August 15	Retired	Trent Miles
Campbell	Dale Steele	November 5	Fired	Mike Minter
Northwestern State	Bradley Dale Peveto	November 19	Fired	Jay Thomas
Western Illinois	Mark Hendrickson	November 19	Fired	Bob Nielson
Morehead State	Matt Ballard	November 20	Fired	Rob Tenyer
Indiana State	Trent Miles	November 30	Hired by Georgia State	Mike Sanford
Jacksonville State	Jack Crowe	November 30	Fired	Bill Clark
UC Davis	Bob Biggs	December 1	Retired	Ron Gould
Appalachian State	Jerry Moore	December 2	Retired	Scott Satterfield
Cornell	Kent Austin	December 17	Hired by Hamilton Tiger-Cats	David Archer
San Diego	Ron Caragher	December 17	Hired by San Jose State	Dale Lindsey
Davidson	Brett Hayford	December 21	Permanent replacement	Paul Nichols
Charleston Southern	Jay Mills	January 3	Retired	Jamey Chadwell
Delaware	K. C. Keeler	January 7	Fired	Dave Brock
Gardner–Webb	Ron Dickerson, Jr.	January 17	Resigned	Carroll McCray
Savannah State	Steve Davenport	April 17	Fired	Earnest Wilson III

- In addition to the above changes, Southern named its interim head coach Dawson Odums as permanent head coach on December 14.

== See also ==
- 2012 NCAA Division I FCS football rankings
