= List of television stations in Illinois =

This is a list of broadcast television stations that are licensed in the U.S. state of Illinois.

== Full-power ==
- Stations are arranged by media market served and channel position.

Full-power television stations in Illinois
Media market	Station	Channel	Primary affiliation(s)	Notes	Refs
Champaign–Springfield	WCIA	3	CBS, MyNetworkTV on 3.2		
Champaign–Springfield	WILL-TV	12	PBS	(Note: Licensed to Urbana, Illinois.)	
Champaign–Springfield	WSEC	14	PBS	(Note: Licensed to Jacksonville, Illinois.)	
Champaign–Springfield	WICD	15	ABC	(Note: Semi-satellite of WICS.)	
Champaign–Springfield	WAND	17	NBC	(Note: Licensed to Decatur, Illinois.)	
Champaign–Springfield	WICS	20	ABC		
Champaign–Springfield	WBUI	23	The CW		
Champaign–Springfield	WCCU	27	Fox	(Note: Semi-satellite of WRSP-TV.)	
Champaign–Springfield	WCIX	49	MyNetworkTV, CBS on 49.2		
Champaign–Springfield	WEIU-TV	51	Educational independent	(Note: Licensed to Charleston, Illinois.)	
Champaign–Springfield	WRSP-TV	55	Fox		
Chicago	WBBM-TV	2	CBS		
Chicago	WMAQ-TV	5	NBC		
Chicago	WLS-TV	7	ABC		
Chicago	WGN-TV	9	The CW		
Chicago	WTTW	11	PBS		
Chicago	WCIU-TV	26	Independent		
Chicago	WFLD	32	Fox		
Chicago	WWTO-TV	35	TBN	(Note: Licensed to Naperville, Illinois.)	
Chicago	WCPX-TV	38	Ion Television		
Chicago	WSNS-TV	44	Telemundo, TeleXitos on 44.2		
Chicago	WXFT-DT	60	UniMás	(Note: Licensed to Aurora, Illinois.)	
Chicago	WGBO-DT	66	Univision	(Note: Licensed to Joliet, Illinois.)	
Peoria	WHOI	19	MyNetworkTV		
Peoria	WEEK-TV	25	NBC, ABC on 25.2, The CW on 25.3		
Peoria	WMBD-TV	31	CBS	(Note: Licensed to Bloomington, Illinois.)	
Peoria	WYZZ-TV	43	Fox		
Peoria	WTVP	47	PBS		
Peoria	WTVK	59	Infomercials	(Note: Licensed to Oswego, Illinois.)	
Quincy	WGEM-TV	10	NBC, The CW on 10.2, Fox on 10.3		
Quincy	WTJR	16	CTN		
Quincy	WMEC	22	PBS	(Note: Licensed to Macomb, Illinois.) (Note: Satellite of WSEC.)	
Quincy	WQEC	27	PBS		
Rockford	WREX	13	NBC, The CW on 13.2, CBS on 23.10		
Rockford	WTVO	17	ABC, MyNetworkTV on 17.2		
Rockford	WSLN	19	The CW	(Note: Licensed to Freeport, Illinois.)	
Rockford	WQRF-TV	39	Fox		
~Davenport, IA	WHBF-TV	4	CBS, The CW on 4.2	(Note: Licensed to Rock Island, Illinois.)	
~Davenport, IA	WQAD-TV	8	ABC, MyNetworkTV on 8.3	(Note: Licensed to Moline, Illinois.)	
~Davenport, IA	WQPT-TV	24	PBS		
~Davenport, IA	WMWC-TV	53	TBN	(Note: Licensed to Galesburg, Illinois.)	
~Terre Haute, IN	WUSI-TV	16	PBS	(Note: Licensed to Olney, Illinois.) (Note: Semi-satellite of WSIU-TV.)	
~Terre Haute, IN	WEIU-TV	51	PBS		
~Paducah, KY	WSIL-TV	3	ABC	(Note: Licensed to Harrisburg, Illinois.)	
~Paducah, KY	WSIU-TV	8	PBS	(Note: Licensed to Carbondale, Illinois.)	
~Paducah, KY	WTCT	27	TCT	(Note: Licensed to Marion, Illinois.)	
~St. Louis, MO	WPXS	13	Daystar	(Note: Licensed to Mount Vernon, Illinois.)	
~St. Louis, MO	WRBU	46	Ion Television	(Note: Licensed to East St. Louis, Illinois.)	

== Low-power ==
Low-power television stations in Illinois
Media market	Station	Channel	Primary affiliation(s)	Notes	Refs
Champaign–Springfield	W07DD-D	7	3ABN		
Champaign–Springfield	WCQA-LD	16	Various		
Champaign–Springfield	WBXC-CD	18	Heartland	(Note: Licensed to Champaign and Urbana, Illinois.)	
Champaign–Springfield	W19EE-D	19	[Blank]		
Champaign–Springfield	WEAE-LD	21	Various		
Champaign–Springfield	WXSG-LD	27	Various		
Champaign–Springfield	W31EH-D	33	HSN		
Champaign–Springfield	W23EW-D	41	Various		
Champaign–Springfield	WLCF-LD	45	CTN		
Chicago	WCHU-LD	3	Various		
Chicago	WILC-CD	6	Daystar	(Note: Licensed to Sugar Grove, Illinois.)	
Chicago	WOCK-CD	13	Various		
Chicago	WRJK-LD	22	Various	(Note: Licensed to Arlington Heights, Illinois.)	
Chicago	WWME-CD	23	MeTV		
Chicago	WPVN-CD	24	Various		
Chicago	W31EZ-D	25	Various	(Note: Licensed to Arbury Hills, Illinois.)	
Chicago	WAUR-LD	29	YTA TV		
Chicago	WLPD-CD	30	TBN Inspire	(Note: Licensed to Plano, Illinois.)	
Chicago	WSPY-LD	31	YTA TV	(Note: Licensed to Earlville, Illinois.)	
Chicago	WRME-LD	33	Jewelry Television (MeTV FM on 87.7 FM)		
Chicago	WEDE-CD	34	Religious independent		
Chicago	WESV-LD	40	Estrella TV		
Chicago	WMEU-CD	48	Independent, CBS on 48.3		
Chicago	WDCI-LD	57	Daystar		
Peoria	W27EQ-D	27	Various		
Quincy	W17EH-D	17	Various		
Quincy	W27DF-D	18	Silent		
Quincy	WVDM-LD	40	Various		
Rockford	WIFR-LD	23	CBS		
Rockford	WFBN-LD	35	Heroes & Icons, Telemundo on 35.2, CBS on 23.11		
~Terre Haute, IN	WEDK-LD	25	[Blank]	(Note: Licensed to Effingham, Illinois.)	
~Paducah, KY	W15BU-D	15	3ABN	(Note: Licensed to Johnston City, Illinois.)	
~St. Louis, MO	W29CI-D	29	Various	(Note: Licensed to Salem, Illinois.)	
~St. Louis, MO	W36EX-D	36	Various	(Note: Licensed to Alton, Illinois.)	
~St. Louis, MO	W09DL-D	42	Various		
~St. Louis, MO	WLEH-LD	48	Various		

== Translators ==
Television station translators in Illinois
Media market	Station	Channel	Translating	Notes	Refs
Champaign–Springfield	W23EQ-D	17	WAND	(Note: Licensed to Danville, Illinois.)	
Champaign–Springfield	W33EK-D	17	WAND		
Champaign–Springfield	W29ES-D	17	WAND		
~Davenport, IA	W27EJ-D	24	WQPT	(Note: Licensed to Sterling, Illinois.)	
~Terre Haute, IN	W33EK-D	17	WAND		

== Defunct ==
- WBLN Bloomington (1953–1957, 1957–1958)
- WICD Danville (1953–1967)
- WEEQ LaSalle, relayed WEEK-TV (1957–1973)
- WIFR Freeport/Rockford (1965–2017)
- WJJY Jacksonville (1969–1971)
- WYCC Chicago (1965–2022)
- WEIU Charleston (1986-2026)
