= WEIU =

WEIU may refer to:

- WEIU (FM), a radio station (88.9 FM) licensed to Charleston, Illinois, United States
- WEIU-TV, a defunct television station (channel 51 analog/50 digital) licensed to Charleston, Illinois, United States
- Women's Educational and Industrial Union, a Boston-based women's exchange founded in 1877
