= 2012 Austin Peay Governors football team =

American college football season

2012 Austin Peay Governors football
- Conference: Ohio Valley Conference
- Record: 2–9 (1–7 OVC)
- Head coach: Rick Christophel (6th season)
- Defensive coordinator: Granville Eastman (8th season)
- Home stadium: Governors Stadium

2012 Ohio Valley Conference football standings
| | Conf. | | | Overall |
| Team | W | | L | W | | L |
|---|---|---|---|---|---|---|
| Eastern Illinois $^ | 6 | – | 1 | 7 | – | 5 |
| No. 22 Eastern Kentucky | 6 | – | 2 | 8 | – | 3 |
| UT Martin | 6 | – | 2 | 8 | – | 3 |
| Jacksonville State | 5 | – | 3 | 6 | – | 5 |
| Tennessee State | 4 | – | 3 | 8 | – | 3 |
| Murray State | 4 | – | 4 | 5 | – | 6 |
| Southeast Missouri State | 2 | – | 6 | 3 | – | 8 |
| Tennessee Tech | 1 | – | 7 | 3 | – | 8 |
| Austin Peay | 1 | – | 7 | 2 | – | 9 |
$ – Conference champion; ^ – FCS playoff participant; Rankings from The Sports Network poll

The 2012 Austin Peay Governors football team represented Austin Peay State University during the 2012 NCAA Division I FCS football season. They were led by sixth-year head coach Rick Christophel and played their home games at Governors Stadium. They are a member of the Ohio Valley Conference. They finished the season 2–9, 1–7 in OVC play to finish in eighth place.

== Schedule ==
| Date | Time | Opponent | Site | TV | Result | Attendance |
|---|---|---|---|---|---|---|
| September 1 | 6:00 pm | at Western Kentucky* | Houchens Industries–L. T. Smith Stadium; Bowling Green, KY | ESPN3 | L 10–49 | 16,327 |
| September 8 | 12:30 pm | at No. 18 (FBS) Virginia Tech* | Lane Stadium; Blacksburg, VA | ESPN3 | L 7–42 | 65,632 |
| September 15 | 1:00 pm | at Tennessee State | Hale Stadium; Nashville, TN (Sgt. York Trophy) | | L 14–34 | 14,264 |
| September 22 | 6:00 pm | UT Martin | Governors Stadium; Clarksville, TN (Sgt. York Trophy) | APSU-TV | L 6–31 | 7,463 |
| September 29 | 1:30 pm | at Eastern Illinois | O'Brien Stadium; Charleston, IL | WEIU | L 15–65 | 9,154 |
| October 6 | 6:00 pm | Murray State | Governors Stadium; Clarksville, TN | APSU-TV | L 14–52 | 3,818 |
| October 13 | 2:00 pm | at No. 23 Eastern Kentucky | Roy Kidd Stadium; Richmond, KY | | L 14–45 | 11,100 |
| October 27 | 4:00 pm | Southeast Missouri State^{†} | Governors Stadium; Clarksville, TN | APSU-TV | L 27–48 | 4,028 |
| November 3 | 1:00 pm | Culver–Stockton* | Governors Stadium; Clarksville, TN | APSU-TV | W 56–0 | 2,856 |
| November 10 | 3:00 pm | at Jacksonville State | JSU Stadium; Jacksonville, AL | | L 23–38 | 11,523 |
| November 17 | 1:00 pm | Tennessee Tech | Governors Stadium; Clarksville, TN (Sgt. York Trophy) | APSU-TV | W 38–31 | 3,738 |
*Non-conference game; ^{†}Homecoming; Rankings from The Sports Network Poll released prior to the game; All times are in Central time

- Source: Schedule
