= WUSI =

WUSI or Wusi may refer to:

- May Fourth Movement or Wusi Movement
  - Wusi Square
- WUSI (FM), a radio station (90.3 FM) licensed to serve Olney, Illinois, United States
- WUSI-TV, a television station (channel 23, virtual 16) licensed to serve Olney, Illinois
- Wusi language, an Oceanic language spoken in Vanuatu

== See also ==
- Wusih, former spelling of Wuxi, China
