= WSIU =

WSIU may refer to:

- WSIU-TV, a television station (channel 8) licensed to Carbondale, Illinois, United States
- WSIU (FM), a radio station (91.9 FM) licensed to Carbondale, Illinois, United States
