= WJJY =

WJJY may refer to:

- WJJY-FM, a radio station (106.7 FM) licensed to Brainerd, Minnesota, United States
- WJJY-TV, an ABC television affiliate for Quincy, Illinois, United States, from 1969 to 1971
- WWWI (AM), a radio station (1270 AM) licensed to Baxter, Minnesota, United States, which used the call sign WJJY from April 1986 to March 1994
