= 2012 Eastern Kentucky Colonels football team =

American college football season

2012 Eastern Kentucky Colonels football
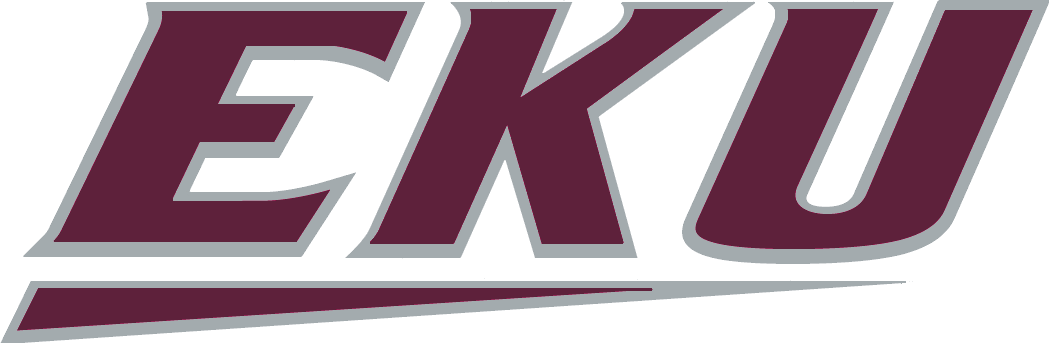
- Conference: Ohio Valley Conference

Ranking
- Sports Network: No. 23
- FCS Coaches: No. 19
- Record: 8–3 (6–2 OVC)
- Head coach: Dean Hood (5th season)
- Offensive coordinator: Dane Damron (2nd season)
- Defensive coordinator: Tony Hatmaker (2nd season)
- Home stadium: Roy Kidd Stadium

2012 Ohio Valley Conference football standings
	Conf.			Overall
Team	W		L	W		L
Eastern Illinois $^	6	–	1	7	–	5
No. 22 Eastern Kentucky	6	–	2	8	–	3
UT Martin	6	–	2	8	–	3
Jacksonville State	5	–	3	6	–	5
Tennessee State	4	–	3	8	–	3
Murray State	4	–	4	5	–	6
Southeast Missouri State	2	–	6	3	–	8
Tennessee Tech	1	–	7	3	–	8
Austin Peay	1	–	7	2	–	9
$ – Conference champion; ^ – FCS playoff participant; Rankings from The Sports Network poll

The 2012 Eastern Kentucky Colonels football team represented Eastern Kentucky University during the 2012 NCAA Division I FCS football season. They were led by fifth-year head coach Dean Hood and played their home games at Roy Kidd Stadium. They were a member of the Ohio Valley Conference (OVC). Eastern Kentucky had an overall record of 8–3 with a 6–2 mark in OVC play to finish in a tie for second place.

== Schedule ==
Date	Time	Opponent	Rank	Site	TV	Result	Attendance
September 1	3:30 pm	at Purdue*	No. 18	Ross–Ade Stadium; West Lafayette, IN	BTN	L 6–48	40,572
September 8	6:00 pm	Morehead State*	No. 21	Roy Kidd Stadium; Richmond, KY (Old Hawg Rifle)		W 24–17	11,600
September 15	6:00 pm	at Coastal Carolina*	No. 20	Brooks Stadium; Conway, SC		W 35–17	9,316
September 22	6:00 pm	No. 24 Jacksonville State	No. 21	Roy Kidd Stadium; Richmond, KY		W 51–21	13,700
September 29	12:00 pm	at UT Martin	No. 19	Graham Stadium; Martin, TN		W 28–16	4,994
October 6	2:00 pm	at Tennessee State	No. 17	Hale Stadium; Nashville, TN		L 20–23	6,369
October 13	3:00 pm	Austin Peay	No. 23	Roy Kidd Stadium; Richmond, KY		W 45–14	11,100
October 20	8:00 pm	at Tennessee Tech	No. 23	Tucker Stadium; Cookeville, TN		W 42–28	5,668
October 27	12:00 pm	Eastern Illinois	No. 18	Roy Kidd Stadium; Richmond, KY	FCS	L 7–24	4,400
November 3	2:00 pm	at Southeast Missouri State	No. 25	Houck Stadium; Cape Girardeau, MO		W 31–7	3,525
November 10	1:00 pm	Murray State	No. 22	Roy Kidd Stadium; Richmond, KY		W 55–24	8,200
*Non-conference game; Rankings from The Sports Network Poll released prior to the game; All times are in Eastern time

== Ranking movements ==
Ranking movements Legend: ██ Increase in ranking ██ Decrease in ranking
	Week												
Poll	Pre	1	2	3	4	5	6	7	8	9	10	11	Final
Sports Network	18	21	20	21	19	17	23	23	18	25	22	21	23
Coaches	21	25	25	23	19	16	23	24	18	23	17	16	19
