= 2012 Tennessee Tech Golden Eagles football team =

American college football season

2012 Tennessee Tech Golden Eagles football
- Conference: Ohio Valley Conference
- Record: 3–8 (1–7 OVC)
- Head coach: Watson Brown (6th season)
- Offensive coordinator: Steven Brown (1st season)
- Offensive scheme: Multiple spread
- Defensive coordinator: Billy Taylor (5th season)
- Base defense: Multiple 4–2–5
- Home stadium: Tucker Stadium

2012 Ohio Valley Conference football standings
	Conf.			Overall
Team	W		L	W		L
Eastern Illinois $^	6	–	1	7	–	5
No. 22 Eastern Kentucky	6	–	2	8	–	3
UT Martin	6	–	2	8	–	3
Jacksonville State	5	–	3	6	–	5
Tennessee State	4	–	3	8	–	3
Murray State	4	–	4	5	–	6
Southeast Missouri State	2	–	6	3	–	8
Tennessee Tech	1	–	7	3	–	8
Austin Peay	1	–	7	2	–	9
$ – Conference champion; ^ – FCS playoff participant; Rankings from The Sports Network poll

The 2012 Tennessee Tech Golden Eagles football team represented Tennessee Technological University as a member of Ohio Valley Conference (OVC) during the 2012 NCAA Division I FCS football season. Led by sixth-year head coach Watson Brown, the Golden Eagles compiled an overall record of 3–8 overall with a mark of 1–7 in conference play, tying for eighth place in the OVC. Tennessee Tech played home games at Tucker Stadium in Cookeville, Tennessee.

== Schedule ==
Date	Time	Opponent	Site	TV	Result	Attendance
August 30	7:00 pm	Hampton*	Tucker Stadium; Cookeville, TN	OVCDN	W 41–31	10,130
September 6	7:00 pm	North Greenville*	Tucker Stadium; Cookeville, TN		W 42–14	6,306
September 15	2:00 pm	at No. 4 (FBS) Oregon*	Autzen Stadium; Eugene, OR	P12N	L 14–63	57,091
September 22	6:00 pm	at Southeast Missouri State	Houck Stadium; Cape Girardeau, MO		L 38–41 ^{2OT}	8,327
September 29	6:00 pm	at Murray State	Roy Stewart Stadium; Murray, KY		L 35–70	9,794
October 6	7:00 pm	Jacksonville State	Tucker Stadium; Cookeville, TN		L 28–37	7,141
October 20	7:00 pm	No. 23 Eastern Kentucky	Tucker Stadium; Cookeville, TN		L 28–42	5,668
October 27	1:00 pm	at No. 21 Tennessee State	Hale Stadium; Nashville, TN (Sgt. York Trophy)		L 21–22	11,373
November 3	1:30 pm	Eastern Illinois^{†}	Tucker Stadium; Cookeville, TN		L 24–31	8,968
November 10	1:30 pm	No. 23 UT Martin	Tucker Stadium; Cookeville, TN (Sgt. York Trophy)		W 45–44 ^{OT}	3,709
November 17	1:00 pm	at Austin Peay	Governors Stadium; Clarksville, TN (Sgt. York Trophy)		L 31–38	3,738
*Non-conference game; ^{†}Homecoming; Rankings from The Sports Network Poll released prior to the game; All times are in Central time
