= 2012 Southeast Missouri State Redhawks football team =

American college football season

2012 Southeast Missouri State Redhawks football
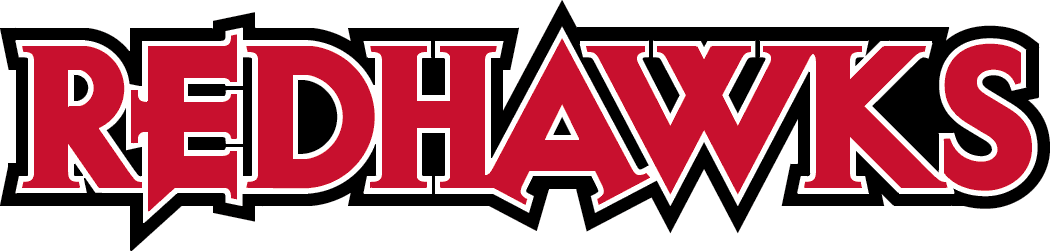
- Conference: Ohio Valley Conference
- Record: 3–8 (2–6 OVC)
- Head coach: Tony Samuel (7th season)
- Offensive coordinator: Tim McGuire (2nd season)
- Defensive coordinator: Brian Mohnsen (2nd season)
- Home stadium: Houck Stadium

2012 Ohio Valley Conference football standings
	Conf.			Overall
Team	W		L	W		L
Eastern Illinois $^	6	–	1	7	–	5
No. 22 Eastern Kentucky	6	–	2	8	–	3
UT Martin	6	–	2	8	–	3
Jacksonville State	5	–	3	6	–	5
Tennessee State	4	–	3	8	–	3
Murray State	4	–	4	5	–	6
Southeast Missouri State	2	–	6	3	–	8
Tennessee Tech	1	–	7	3	–	8
Austin Peay	1	–	7	2	–	9
$ – Conference champion; ^ – FCS playoff participant; Rankings from The Sports Network poll

The 2012 Southeast Missouri State Redhawks football team represented Southeast Missouri State University as a member of the Ohio Valley Conference (OVC) during the 2012 NCAA Division I FCS football season. Led by seventh-year head coach Tony Samuel, the Redhawks compiled an overall record of 3–8 with a mark of 2–6 in conference play, placing seventh in the OVC. Southeast Missouri State played home games at Houck Stadium in Cape Girardeau, Missouri.

== Schedule ==
Date	Time	Opponent	Site	TV	Result	Attendance
August 30	6:00 pm	at Central Michigan*	Kelly/Shorts Stadium; Mount Pleasant, MI	ESPN3	L 27–38	15,250
September 8	6:00 pm	Mars Hill*	Houck Stadium; Cape Girardeau, MO		W 30–18	4,912
September 15	6:00 pm	at Southern Illinois*	Saluki Stadium; Carbondale, IL		L 14–35	9,612
September 22	6:00 pm	Tennessee Tech	Houck Stadium; Cape Girardeau, MO		W 41–38 ^{2OT}	8,327
September 29	3:00 pm	at Jacksonville State	Burgess–Snow Field at JSU Stadium; Jacksonville, AL		L 16–31	16,842
October 13	6:00 pm	No. 18 Tennessee State	Houck Stadium; Cape Girardeau, MO		L 28–40	4,800
October 20	1:00 pm	UT Martin^{†}	Houck Stadium; Cape Girardeau, MO		L 17–27	5,820
October 27	4:00 pm	at Austin Peay	Governors Stadium; Clarksville, TN		W 48–27	4,028
November 3	1:00 pm	No. 25 Eastern Kentucky	Houck Stadium; Cape Girardeau, MO		L 7–31	3,525
November 10	1:30 pm	at Eastern Illinois	O'Brien Field; Charleston, IL	WEIU	L 20–39	5,575
November 17	1:00 pm	at Murray State	Roy Stewart Stadium; Murray, KY		L 35–42	2,299
*Non-conference game; ^{†}Homecoming; Rankings from The Sports Network Poll released prior to the game; All times are in Central time
