= WMEC =

WMEC may refer to:

- Medium endurance cutter, or WMEC, a type of United States Coast Guard Cutter
- WMEC (TV), a satellite television station of WSEC in Macomb, Illinois, US
