= WEAE =

WEAE may refer to:

- WEAE-LD, a low-power television station (channel 21) licensed to serve Springfield, Illinois, United States; see List of television stations in Illinois
- WPGP, a radio station (1250 AM) licensed to serve Pittsburgh, Pennsylvania, United States, which held the call sign WEAE from 1998 to 2010
