= 2012 Eastern Illinois Panthers football team =

American college football season

2012 Eastern Illinois Panthers football
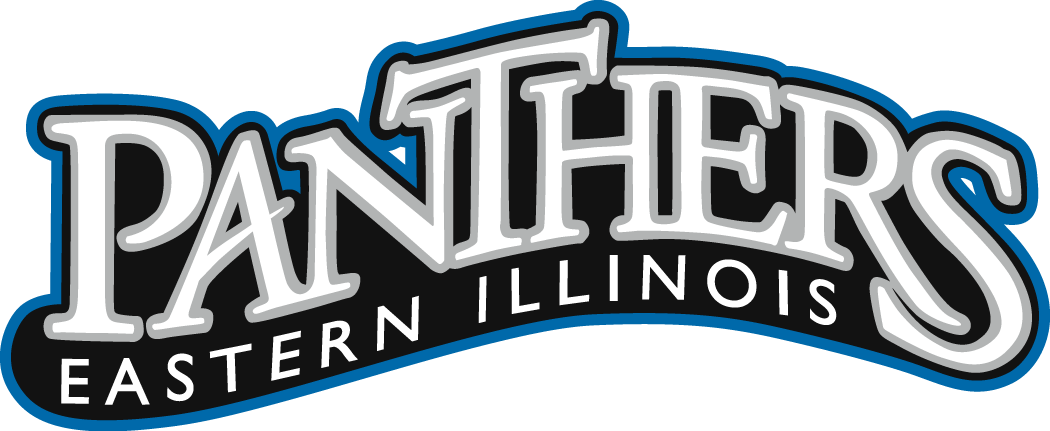

OVC champion

NCAA Division I First Round, L 10–58 vs. South Dakota State
- Conference: Ohio Valley Conference

Ranking
- FCS Coaches: No. 25
- Record: 7–5 (6–1 OVC)
- Head coach: Dino Babers (1st season)
- Offensive coordinator: Sterlin Gilbert (1st season)
- Offensive scheme: Veer and shoot
- Defensive coordinator: Kim McCloud (1st season)
- Base defense: 4–3
- Home stadium: O'Brien Field

2012 Ohio Valley Conference football standings
	Conf.			Overall
Team	W		L	W		L
Eastern Illinois $^	6	–	1	7	–	5
No. 22 Eastern Kentucky	6	–	2	8	–	3
UT Martin	6	–	2	8	–	3
Jacksonville State	5	–	3	6	–	5
Tennessee State	4	–	3	8	–	3
Murray State	4	–	4	5	–	6
Southeast Missouri State	2	–	6	3	–	8
Tennessee Tech	1	–	7	3	–	8
Austin Peay	1	–	7	2	–	9
$ – Conference champion; ^ – FCS playoff participant; Rankings from The Sports Network poll

The 2012 Eastern Illinois Panthers football team represented Eastern Illinois University as a member of the Ohio Valley Conference (OVC) during the 2012 NCAA Division I FCS football season. Led by first-year head coach Dino Babers, the Panthers compiled an overall record of 7–5 overall with a mark of 6–1 in conference play, winning the OVC title. Eastern Illinois earned the conference's automatic bid into the NCAA Division I Football Championship playoffs, where they lost in the first round to South Dakota State. The team played home games at O'Brien Field in Charleston, Illinois.

== Schedule ==
Date	Time	Opponent	Rank	Site	TV	Result	Attendance
August 30	6:30 pm	Southern Illinois*		O'Brien Field; Charleston, IL	WEIU	W 49–28	8,275
September 8	6:00 pm	at Western Michigan*		Waldo Stadium; Kalamazoo, MI		L 21–52	22,536
September 15	1:00 pm	at No. 15 Illinois State*		Hancock Stadium; Normal, IL (Mid-America Classic)		L 51–54 ^{2OT}	7,700
September 22	6:30 pm	Murray State		O'Brien Field; Charleston, IL	WEIU	W 50–49	5,319
September 29	1:30 pm	Austin Peay		O'Brien Field; Charleston, IL	WEIU	W 65–15	9,154
October 6	2:00 pm	at UT Martin		Graham Stadium; Martin, TN		L 37–51	5,456
October 13	1:30 pm	Jacksonville State^{†}		O'Brien Field; Charleston, IL	WEIU	W 31–28	7,358
October 27	12:00 pm	at No. 18 Eastern Kentucky		Roy Kidd Stadium; Richmond, KY		W 24–7	4,400
November 3	1:30 pm	at Tennessee Tech		Tucker Stadium; Cookeville, TN		W 31–24	8,968
November 10	1:30 pm	Southeast Missouri State		O'Brien Field; Charleston, IL	WEIU	W 39–20	5,575
November 17	3:00 pm	at No. 10 Central Arkansas*	No. 24	Estes Stadium; Conway, AR		L 30–48	6,754
November 24	2:00 pm	at No. 19 South Dakota State*	No. 25	Coughlin–Alumni Stadium; Brookings, SD (NCAA Division I First Round)	ESPN3	L 10–58	4,367
*Non-conference game; ^{†}Homecoming; Rankings from The Sports Network Poll released prior to the game; All times are in Central time
