= 2012 Jacksonville State Gamecocks football team =

American college football season

2012 Jacksonville State Gamecocks football
- Conference: Ohio Valley Conference
- Record: 6–5 (5–3 OVC)
- Head coach: Jack Crowe (13th season)
- Offensive coordinator: Ronnie Letson (9th season)
- Defensive coordinator: Chris Boone (2nd season)
- Home stadium: Burgess–Snow Field at JSU Stadium

2012 Ohio Valley Conference football standings
	Conf.			Overall
Team	W		L	W		L
Eastern Illinois $^	6	–	1	7	–	5
No. 22 Eastern Kentucky	6	–	2	8	–	3
UT Martin	6	–	2	8	–	3
Jacksonville State	5	–	3	6	–	5
Tennessee State	4	–	3	8	–	3
Murray State	4	–	4	5	–	6
Southeast Missouri State	2	–	6	3	–	8
Tennessee Tech	1	–	7	3	–	8
Austin Peay	1	–	7	2	–	9
$ – Conference champion; ^ – FCS playoff participant; Rankings from The Sports Network poll

The 2012 Jacksonville State Gamecocks football team represented Jacksonville State University as a member of the Ohio Valley Conference (OVC) during the 2012 NCAA Division I FCS football season. Led by Jack Crowe in his 13th and final season as head coach, the Gamecocks compiled an overall record of 6–5 with a mark of 4–3 in conference play, placing fourth in the OVC. Jacksonville State played home games at Burgess–Snow Field at JSU Stadium in Jacksonville, Alabama.

Crowe was fired on November 30.

== Schedule ==
Date	Time	Opponent	Rank	Site	TV	Result	Attendance
September 1	7:00 pm	at No. 10 (FBS) Arkansas*	No. 22	Donald W. Reynolds Razorback Stadium; Fayetteville, AR	ARSN PPV	L 24–49	71,062
September 8	6:00 pm	Chattanooga*	No. 24	Burgess–Snow Field at JSU Stadium; Jacksonville, AL		W 27–24	18,993
September 22	6:00 pm	at No. 21 Eastern Kentucky	No. 24	Roy Kidd Stadium; Richmond, KY		L 21–51	13,700
September 29	3:00 pm	Southeast Missouri State		Burgess–Snow Field at JSU Stadium; Jacksonville, AL		W 31–16	16,842
October 6	7:00 pm	at Tennessee Tech		Tucker Stadium; Cookeville, TN		W 37–28	7,141
October 13	1:30 pm	at Eastern Illinois		O'Brien Field; Charleston, IL	WEIU	L 28–31	7,358
October 20	12:00 pm	No. 17 Tennessee State		Burgess–Snow Field at JSU Stadium; Jacksonville, AL	FCS	W 31–28 ^{OT}	14,867
October 27	3:00 pm	Murray State^{†}		Burgess–Snow Field at JSU Stadium; Jacksonville, AL		W 38–35	17,807
November 3	12:00 pm	at UT Martin		Graham Stadium; Martin, TN		L 47–49	4,739
November 10	3:00 pm	Austin Peay		Burgess–Snow Field at JSU Stadium; Jacksonville, AL		W 38–23	11,523
November 17	1:00 pm	at No. 7 (FBS) Florida*		Ben Hill Griffin Stadium; Gainesville, FL	PPV	L 0–23	82,691
*Non-conference game; ^{†}Homecoming; Rankings from The Sports Network Poll released prior to the game; All times are in Eastern time

== Ranking movements ==
Ranking movements Legend: ██ Increase in ranking ██ Decrease in ranking RV = Received votes
	Week																
Poll	Pre	1	2	3	4	5	6	7	8	9	10	11	12	13	14	15	Final
Sports Network	22	24	24	24	RV												
Coaches	RV	RV	RV	RV	RV												
