= Cleaning For A Reason =

Nonprofit organization providing free house cleaning for cancer patients

- Company type: Nonprofit
- Founders: Debbie Sardone
- Headquarters: Lewisville
- Area served: United States, Canada
- Key people: Mike Gies
- Website: cleaningforareason.org

Cleaning for a Reason is a nonprofit organization that provides free house cleaning for cancer patients. It was founded by American businesswoman Debbie Sardone whose mother is a cancer survivor. Since its founding in 2006, Cleaning For A Reason has helped over 50,000 families battling cancer with free house cleaning services valued at over $17M. Over 1,200 maid services are part of the Cleaning for a Reason network.

Debbie Sardone started the organization after she received a phone call from a woman who was undergoing chemotherapy. She inquired about her house cleaning services but couldn't afford the cost because she was unemployed due to her cancer treatment.

Cleaning for a Reason was adopted by ISSA Charities, the charitable arm of ISSA, The Worldwide Cleaning Industry Association. To apply for services, to join as a cleaning partner, or to support the work of Cleaning for a Reason, visit cleaningforareason.org.

In 2015, Cleaning For A Reason was the subject of an Alt.news 26:46 documentary film.
