= Alt.news 26:46 =

- Presented by: None
- Country of origin: United States
- No. of seasons: 27

Production
- Executive producers: Dillon Patton, Will Elliott
- Running time: 26 minutes, 46 seconds (per episode)

Original release
- Network: WSIU-TV
- Release: 1999 – present

alt.news 26:46 is a student-run television program from Southern Illinois University Carbondale that airs on the university's PBS member station, WSIU. This half hour magazine-style TV program has won national acclaim by capturing thirty-one regional and national awards including seven College Television Awards, or student Emmys. The "26:46" in the show's name reflects its general length per program—26 minutes, 46 seconds, with the remaining time in its half-hour slot used for WSIU's promos and messages. The show originated as the entertainment segment on River Region Evening Edition— a student-run news program from the School of Journalism and Advertising at SIUC— in 1995, but spun off into its own program in 1999, being produced instead by its own self-titled registered student organization (RSO).

== History ==
Alt.news began in 1995 when SIU alumni encouraged the school to expand its daily news program. Students were asked to compete for several different weekly special segments, one of which was supposed to be an entertainment news segment. This entertainment segment was morphed into a weekly news show called alt.news. It featured a smart and wacky documentary style about everything and anything. The average length was about seven minutes long and aired each Thursday night, quickly becoming the most controversial and anticipated news segment. Alt.news continued in this format for three years until it was turned into the half hour show that it is today.

== Filmography ==
Year	Title	Notes
2015	Cleaning For A Reason	A film about Lewisville, Texas based nonprofit organization.

== See also ==
- WSIU-TV
- Southern Illinois University Carbondale
