= 2012 UT Martin Skyhawks football team =

American college football season

2012 UT Martin Skyhawks football
- Conference: Ohio Valley Conference
- Record: 8–3 (6–2 OVC)
- Head coach: Jason Simpson (7th season)
- Co-offensive coordinators: Mac Bryan (3rd season); Carmen Felus (2nd season)
- Defensive coordinator: Jeff Byrd (1st season)
- Home stadium: Graham Stadium

2012 Ohio Valley Conference football standings
	Conf.			Overall
Team	W		L	W		L
Eastern Illinois $^	6	–	1	7	–	5
No. 22 Eastern Kentucky	6	–	2	8	–	3
UT Martin	6	–	2	8	–	3
Jacksonville State	5	–	3	6	–	5
Tennessee State	4	–	3	8	–	3
Murray State	4	–	4	5	–	6
Southeast Missouri State	2	–	6	3	–	8
Tennessee Tech	1	–	7	3	–	8
Austin Peay	1	–	7	2	–	9
$ – Conference champion; ^ – FCS playoff participant; Rankings from The Sports Network poll

The 2012 UT Martin Skyhawks football team represented the University of Tennessee at Martin as a member of the Ohio Valley Conference (OVC) during the 2012 NCAA Division I FCS football season. Led by seventh-year head coach Jason Simpson, the Skyhawks compiled an overall record of 8–3 with a mark of 6–2 in conference play, tying for second place in the OVC. UT Martin played home games at Graham Stadium in Martin, Tennessee.

== Schedule ==
Date	Time	Opponent	Rank	Site	TV	Result	Attendance
September 1	7:00 pm	at Memphis*		Liberty Bowl Memorial Stadium; Memphis, TN		W 20–17	39,076
September 8	6:00 pm	at Northern Illinois*		Huskie Stadium; DeKalb, IL	ESPN3	L 7–35	16,010
September 13	6:00 pm	Southeastern Louisiana*		Graham Stadium; Martin, TN		W 23–6	4,012
September 22	6:00 pm	at Austin Peay		Governors Stadium; Clarksville, TN (Sgt. York Trophy)		W 31–6	7,463
September 29	11:00 am	No. 19 Eastern Kentucky		Graham Stadium; Martin, TN		L 16–28	4,994
October 6	2:00 pm	Eastern Illinois^{†}		Graham Stadium; Martin, TN		W 51–37	5,456
October 13	3:00 pm	at Murray State		Roy Stewart Stadium; Murray, KY		W 66–59	9,597
October 20	1:00 pm	at Southeast Missouri State		Houck Stadium; Cape Girardeau, MO		W 27–17	5,820
November 3	12:00 pm	Jacksonville State		Graham Stadium; Martin, TN		W 49–47	4,739
November 10	1:30 pm	at Tennessee Tech	No. 23	Tucker Stadium; Cookeville, TN (Sgt. York Trophy)		L 44–45 ^{OT}	3,709
November 17	2:00 pm	No. 23 Tennessee State		Graham Stadium; Martin, TN (Sgt. York Trophy)		W 35–26	6,322
*Non-conference game; ^{†}Homecoming; Rankings from The Sports Network Poll released prior to the game; All times are in Central time
