= 2012 Tennessee State Tigers football team =

American college football season

2012 Tennessee State Tigers football
- Conference: Ohio Valley Conference
- Record: 8–3 (4–3 OVC)
- Head coach: Rod Reed (3rd season)
- Offensive coordinator: Mike Jones (3rd season)
- Co-defensive coordinators: Osita Alaribe (2nd season); Justin Roberts (2nd season)
- Home stadium: LP Field; Hale Stadium

2012 Ohio Valley Conference football standings
	Conf.			Overall
Team	W		L	W		L
Eastern Illinois $^	6	–	1	7	–	5
No. 22 Eastern Kentucky	6	–	2	8	–	3
UT Martin	6	–	2	8	–	3
Jacksonville State	5	–	3	6	–	5
Tennessee State	4	–	3	8	–	3
Murray State	4	–	4	5	–	6
Southeast Missouri State	2	–	6	3	–	8
Tennessee Tech	1	–	7	3	–	8
Austin Peay	1	–	7	2	–	9
$ – Conference champion; ^ – FCS playoff participant; Rankings from The Sports Network poll

The 2012 Tennessee State Tigers football team represented Tennessee State University as a member of the a member of the Ohio Valley Conference (OVC) in the 2012 NCAA Division I FCS football season. They were led by third-year head coach Rod Reed and played their home games at LP Field and Hale Stadium. Tennessee State finished the season 8–3 overall and 4–3 in OVC play to place fifth.

== Schedule ==
Date	Time	Opponent	Rank	Site	TV	Result	Attendance
September 1	6:00 pm	Florida A&M*		LP Field; Nashville, TN (John Merritt Classic)		W 17–14	15,652
September 8	6:00 pm	vs. Jackson State*		Liberty Bowl Memorial Stadium; Memphis, TN (Southern Heritage Classic)	FSS	W 38–12	42,257
September 15	1:00 pm	Austin Peay		Hale Stadium; Nashville, TN (Sgt. York Trophy)		W 34–14	14,264
September 22	4:00 pm	at Bethune-Cookman*		Municipal Stadium; Daytona Beach, FL		W 21–14	9,461
September 29	5:00 pm	Arkansas–Pine Bluff*		LP Field; Nashville, TN		W 40–13	31,765
October 6	1:00 pm	No. 17 Eastern Kentucky		Hale Stadium; Nashville, TN		W 23–20	6,369
October 13	6:00 pm	at Southeast Missouri State	No. 18	Houck Stadium; Cape Girardeau, MO		W 40–28	4,800
October 20	3:00 pm	at Jacksonville State	No. 17	JSU Stadium; Jacksonville, AL	FCS	L 28–31 ^{OT}	14,867
October 27	1:00 pm	Tennessee Tech	No. 21	Hale Stadium; Nashville, TN		W 22–21	11,373
November 3	1:00 pm	at Murray State	No. 18	Roy Stewart Stadium; Murray, KY	FCS	L 28–49	3,112
November 17	2:00 pm	at UT Martin	No. 23	Graham Stadium; Martin, TN		L 26–35	6,322
*Non-conference game; Rankings from The Sports Network Poll released prior to the game; All times are in Central time
