= 2012 Murray State Racers football team =

American college football season

2012 Murray State Racers football
- Conference: Ohio Valley Conference
- Record: 5–6 (4–4 OVC)
- Head coach: Chris Hatcher (3rd season)
- Offensive coordinator: Mitch Stewart (2nd season)
- Offensive scheme: Air raid
- Defensive coordinator: Ashley Anders (3rd season)
- Base defense: 4–3
- Home stadium: Roy Stewart Stadium

2012 Ohio Valley Conference football standings
| | Conf. | | | Overall |
| Team | W | | L | W | | L |
|---|---|---|---|---|---|---|
| Eastern Illinois $^ | 6 | – | 1 | 7 | – | 5 |
| No. 22 Eastern Kentucky | 6 | – | 2 | 8 | – | 3 |
| UT Martin | 6 | – | 2 | 8 | – | 3 |
| Jacksonville State | 5 | – | 3 | 6 | – | 5 |
| Tennessee State | 4 | – | 3 | 8 | – | 3 |
| Murray State | 4 | – | 4 | 5 | – | 6 |
| Southeast Missouri State | 2 | – | 6 | 3 | – | 8 |
| Tennessee Tech | 1 | – | 7 | 3 | – | 8 |
| Austin Peay | 1 | – | 7 | 2 | – | 9 |
$ – Conference champion; ^ – FCS playoff participant; Rankings from The Sports Network poll

The 2012 Murray State Racers football team represented Murray State University in the 2012 NCAA Division I FCS football season. They were led by third-year head coach Chris Hatcher and played their home games at Roy Stewart Stadium. They are a member of the Ohio Valley Conference. They finished the season 5–6, 4–4 in OVC play to finish in sixth place.

== Schedule ==
| Date | Time | Opponent | Site | TV | Result | Attendance |
|---|---|---|---|---|---|---|
| September 1 | 5:00 pm | at No. 7 (FBS) Florida State* | Doak Campbell Stadium; Tallahassee, FL | ESPN3 | L 3–69 | 70,047 |
| September 8 | 6:00 pm | No. 25 Central Arkansas* | Roy Stewart Stadium; Murray, KY | | L 20–42 | 9,848 |
| September 15 | 7:00 pm | at Missouri State* | Plaster Sports Complex; Springfield, MO | Racer TV Network | W 28–23 | 10,002 |
| September 22 | 6:30 pm | at Eastern Illinois | O'Brien Stadium; Charleston, IL | Racer TV Network | L 49–50 | 5,319 |
| September 29 | 6:00 pm | Tennessee Tech | Roy Stewart Stadium; Murray, KY | | W 70–35 | 9,794 |
| October 6 | 6:00 pm | at Austin Peay | Governors Stadium; Clarksville, TN | Racer TV Network | W 52–14 | 3,818 |
| October 13 | 3:00 pm | UT Martin^{†} | Roy Stewart Stadium; Murray, KY | Racer TV Network | L 59–66 | 9,597 |
| October 27 | 3:00 pm | at Jacksonville State | JSU Stadium; Jacksonville, AL | | L 35–38 | 17,807 |
| November 3 | 1:00 pm | No. 18 Tennessee State | Roy Stewart Stadium; Murray, KY | | W 49–28 | 3,112 |
| November 10 | 12:00 pm | at No. 22 Eastern Kentucky | Roy Kidd Stadium; Richmond, KY | Racer TV Network | L 24–55 | 8,200 |
| November 17 | 1:00 pm | Southeast Missouri State | Roy Stewart Stadium; Murray, KY | | W 42–35 | 2,299 |
*Non-conference game; ^{†}Homecoming; Rankings from The Sports Network Poll released prior to the game; All times are in Central time

- Source: Schedule
