= WQPT-TV =

Television station in Moline, Illinois

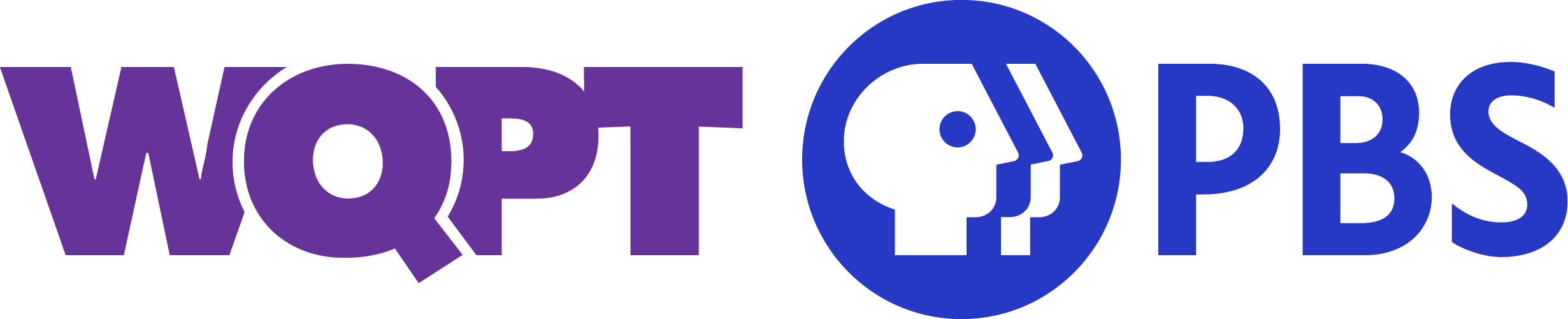
- Moline–Rock Island, Illinois; Davenport–Bettendorf, Iowa; United States
- City: Moline, Illinois
- Channels: Digital: 23 (UHF); Virtual: 24
- Branding: WQPT PBS

Programming
- Affiliations: 24.1: PBS; 24.2: Deutsche Welle

Ownership
- Owner: Western Illinois University

History
- First air date: November 2, 1983
- Former channel numbers: Analog: 24 (UHF, 1983–2009)
- Call sign meaning: Quad-City Public Television

Technical information
- Licensing authority: FCC
- Facility ID: 5468
- ERP: 664 kW
- HAAT: 328.1 m (1,076 ft)
- Transmitter coordinates: 41°18′44.5″N 90°22′46.2″W
- Translator(s): W27EJ-D Sterling, IL

Links
- Public license information: Public file; LMS
- Website: www.wqpt.org

WQPT-TV (channel 24) is a PBS member television station licensed to Moline, Illinois, United States, serving the Quad Cities area of northwestern Illinois and southeastern Iowa. It is owned by Western Illinois University (WIU) and maintains studios at Riverfront Hall on WIU's Quad Cities campus on River Drive in Moline. It broadcasts from its primary transmitter in Orion, Illinois, and through W27EJ-D, a translator in Sterling, Illinois. WQPT-TV is the secondary PBS station for the Quad Cities, which is also served by Iowa PBS.

When WQPT-TV began broadcasting on November 2, 1983, the Quad Cities was one of the largest population centers in the U.S. unserved by a broadcast public TV station. The area was originally to be served by the Convocom public television network under development for western and west-central Illinois, but the network's original plans were scrapped due to a lack of state funding. As a result, Black Hawk College (BHC) in Moline decided to develop the station locally. The station was owned by the college but operated by a local advisory board. It provided PBS programming as well as local series, such as Perspective and Life and Times. In the 1990s, it expanded its signal, first in 1991 with a satellite station (KQCT, channel 36) to improve the signal in the Iowa portion of the Quad Cities and in 1997 with a transmitter move from the BHC campus to Orion. The KQCT license was sold to the Iowa network in 2003, resulting in overlap between the two public services.

Declining state support and rising costs led Black Hawk College to discontinue funding support for WQPT in 2007. To save money, WQPT became a secondary station under PBS's Program Differentiation Plan, only airing 25% of the network's national programming. The station's license was nearly sold to the advisory board, but a conversation about outsourcing human resources functions instead led Western Illinois University to acquire the station. WIU acquired the license in 2010 and moved the station to its own offices, then to its Quad Cities campus in 2014. WQPT was one of the public TV stations most reliant on Corporation for Public Broadcasting funds prior to their rescission in 2025.

== Pre-planning ==
In 1974, the Board of Governors of State Colleges and Universities authorized Western Illinois University (WIU) in Macomb and Black Hawk College (BHC) in Moline to study plans for a jointly operated educational television station that would broadcast on channel 22 in Macomb and channel 24 in Moline, with a microwave transmission system connecting the two institutions and Bradley University in Peoria. Finding that they did not have the resources to execute what they wanted, the concept was expanded.

In January 1976, a consortium of higher education institutions in west central Illinois received a federal grant for an educational television network and transmission system. BHC, WIU, Sangamon State University (SSU) in Springfield, and the Illinois Valley Educational Television Corporation in Peoria, owner of that city's WTVP (channel 47), formed the West Central Illinois Educational Telecommunications Corporation. The system as planned would transmit through WTVP and two new stations: channel 14 at Jacksonville, transmitting from Bluffs, and channel 24 in the Quad Cities area, with studios in the Quad Cities, Macomb, Springfield, and Peoria. It would reach 2 million people in a 32,000-square-mile (83,000 km^{2}) area that was among the largest population centers yet unserved by a public TV station. The group filed to assume the application previously made by WIU in 1974 for the Moline station. It intended to be on the air by late 1978 with a system that permitted transmission of educational programming over the air and separate programming between institutions. In the evenings, the system would air PBS programs provided by WTVP, where an earth station already existed to receive PBS programs by satellite. The name of the consortium was unwieldy: Michael McGrevey of the Quad-City Times wrote, "That title is worse than the Iowa Educational Broadcast Network. They ought to just call these organizations something like 'Ralph' or 'Nancy'." In recognition that the 22-syllable name was "too cumbersome", in January 1978, the group renamed itself Convocom, after the words "convocation" and "communication".

Convocom's ambition to be on the air was slowed by financial and other difficulties. For the channel 14 station, Convocom intended to reuse the transmitter facility of the former commercial WJJY-TV, but it was toppled in a 1978 ice storm. Attempts to secure state funding in 1977 and 1978 were vetoed by governor Jim Thompson; state representative Sam McGrew attributed some of the problem of obtaining funding to the station's location in Forgottonia, an area often bypassed by state funding. When Thompson vetoed a third appropriations bill for Convocom in August 1979, network president George Hall claimed that Thompson announced he would not fund the system as long as he was in office. Hall declared, "The great educational TV desert of western Illinois will remain sandy."

== Black Hawk College era ==
=== Construction and early years ===
In the wake of the failure of the first Convocom plan, the college initially pursued a proposal to transmit programs by microwave to cable systems; it already operated such a channel in Moline and East Moline. However, the costs for such a system were similar to those for a broadcast station, which would serve those people outside the reach of cable and thus the signals of KIIN of Iowa City or WTTW of Chicago. The need for a public television station to serve the Quad Cities in particular was acute, and once Convocom indicated it would not finance such a facility, Black Hawk College decided to pursue construction of its own accord. On December 8, 1980, the college filed an application with the FCC for channel 24, which the commission granted on December 22, 1981. This followed the award of a grant from the National Telecommunications and Information Administration to finance 75 percent of the cost of the transmission facility.

WQPT-TV began broadcasting on November 2, 1983. Though licensed to Black Hawk College and using BHC students for studio work, it was operated by the community-based Greater Quad Cities Telecommunications Corporation. A friends group, Friends of 24, was supported to coordinate volunteers and raise money in the community. Though WQPT was run separately, BHC remained a member of Convocom and part of its network, which entered into service in January 1984. In 1985, WQPT hosted a town hall with congressman Lane Evans that used the Convocom network.

By 1986, WQPT was airing daily instructional programs for schools as well as college telecourses. In partnership with WQAD-TV (channel 8), the local edition of Romper Room began airing on channel 24 when that station found itself moving the children's show to early morning hours; WQAD ceased local production of Romper in 1986, with the national syndicated version airing in its stead on both stations. WQPT added two regular programs in the late 1980s and early 1990s. WQPT debuted Perspective, a regular public affairs series hosted by former TV news anchor Susan McBride, in 1989. McBride also hosted Life and Times, an interview-based program, which premiered in 1993. During this era, WQPT had four managers in a five-year span.

=== Transmitter expansion ===
The original WQPT-TV transmission facility was on a 300 feet (91 m) tower at Black Hawk College. As a result, WQPT-TV struggled with its signal—and its fundraising—in parts of the Quad Cities. Particularly low-lying areas did not get a satisfactory signal from Moline. In 1991, the station received a federal grant to build two new transmitters—one in Davenport, Iowa, on channel 36, and the other a translator in Sterling, Illinois. Both facilities were in operation by December 1991, with channel 36 as KQCT operating from a transmitter site on Harrison Street in Davenport. In 1997, WQPT-TV moved to an 800-foot (240 m) tower at Orion, Illinois, doubling its population served and tripling its area served. This facility made channel 36 redundant.

In 2001, as part of a settlement involving applications made by the two groups and a Tennessee man for the reserved channel 30 in Davenport, WQPT agreed to sell KQCT to Iowa Public Television for $200,000. The state network needed the facility because the conversion to digital television would weaken the already weak signal it provided to the Quad Cities from Iowa City. KQCT ceased rebroadcasting WQPT in 2003, and channel 36 was integrated into the Iowa network as KQIN. KQIN began broadcasting from the same Orion tower as WQPT. Funding from the Iowa Public Television settlement and with Gartner as well as grants from gambling authorities in Iowa paid for the digital conversion of WQPT, which commenced digital service in July 2003.

=== Financial crisis ===
In the 2000s, Black Hawk College contended with falling state support and rising health care costs. BHC cut its annual appropriation for WQPT by a third for the 2006–07-year, exacerbating programming cost increases and falling support from the Corporation for Public Broadcasting (CPB) at WQPT. The station suddenly found itself with a deficit of nearly $200,000, which it cut down through aggressive fundraising and internal cuts. In March 2007, Black Hawk College moved to discontinue all support for WQPT, representing 20 percent of the station's budget. The college had determined that the station no longer fit in its workforce education remit. WQPT also lost funding due to cuts to the Illinois Arts Council.

Black Hawk College's trustees voted to explore the sale of WQPT's broadcast license in June 2007. The Greater Quad-Cities Telecommunications Corporation explored acquiring the license, which would have made the station community-owned. However, they could not afford the $2.5 million that BHC was seeking. As a result, the board preferred for the college to either keep the WQPT license or find a buyer willing to keep it a public TV station.

WQPT joined PBS's Program Differentiation Plan in 2008 and became a secondary station. While it lost the ability to air programs on less than an eight-day delay to Iowa Public Television and reduced its annual hours of PBS programming from 2,700 to 675, it expected to save $300,000 in PBS fees. McPeters (Note: Susan McBride married in 1996 and changed her name.) was laid off in 2009 in light of a continuing deficit at WQPT. By January 2009, plans were under way to transfer the WQPT license to the Greater Quad-Cities Telecommunications Corporation. The move received the approval of both parties. General manager Rick Best admitted that one of the biggest burdens on the board in becoming a community licensee was absorbing functions carried out by Black Hawk College such as human resources and benefits.

During this time, the digital television transition occurred; WQPT, which had planned to continue analog service through the entire four-month delay from the DTV Delay Act, instead ceased analog broadcasts on May 25 when the transmitter suffered irreparable damage. The station's digital signal remained on its pre-transition UHF channel 23, using virtual channel 24.

== Western Illinois University ownership ==
Because of the concern about human resources, the Greater Quad-Cities Telecommunications Corporation approached Western Illinois University about outsourcing that function. Instead, the university—which now had a Quad Cities campus in Moline—expressed interest in taking on the license. In meetings on consecutive days in October 2009, Black Hawk College and WIU approved transferring the WQPT license to the university. As part of the deal, Black Hawk College transferred all station-related assets, except for the tower on the BHC campus, to the university. The Greater Quad-Cities Telecommunications Corporation voted to dissolve itself on December 14, 2009, and in May, WQPT officially moved under WIU ownership. The station relocated to offices in the Crown Center office plaza, a former Sears store, at that time. Under WIU, the station raised its own operating funding while WIU provided support services. Master control services were outsourced to Davenport-based Fusion Communications.

Under its new ownership, WQPT began adding local programming. In August 2010, it debuted WIU Presents, focusing on university news relevant to the Quad Cities. Three months later, the public affairs series The Cities premiered. The studios of Fusion and its successor, Stratus Broadcast Services, were used to originate WQPT's local programming, including The Cities, pledge drives, and an Illinos congressional debate.

The Crown Center location was seen as temporary. At the time, WIU was building a riverfront campus in downtown Moline. The first phase of the campus opened in late 2011, but WQPT did not move at that time. The second phase of the campus included relocating all remaining facilities from WIU's other Moline location. WQPT was relocated into space in the existing Riverfront Hall that was opened up by moving other departments into the new structures completed in 2014. With the relocation, master control functions were assumed by WTVP in Peoria. In 2017, two WIU–Quad Cities leaders donated $100,000, the largest single donation in station history to that time.

At the time of the Rescissions Act of 2025, which defunded the Corporation for Public Broadcasting, WQPT was one of the five most reliant stations on the CPB for funding. In fiscal year 2024, the CPB provided $880,282, or 47.7% of the station's revenue of $1,842,725. The station already only had seven employees, leaving little to cut.

== Subchannels ==
WQPT is broadcast from a transmitter in Orion, Illinois, and through W27EJ-D, a translator in Sterling, Illinois. Its signal is multiplexed:

Subchannels of WQPT-TV
Subchannel	Res.	Short name	Programming
24.1	1080i	WQPT-HD	PBS
24.2	480i	WQPT-DW	Deutsche Welle

== See also ==
- Mass media in the Quad Cities
