= WREX =

Television station in Rockford, Illinois

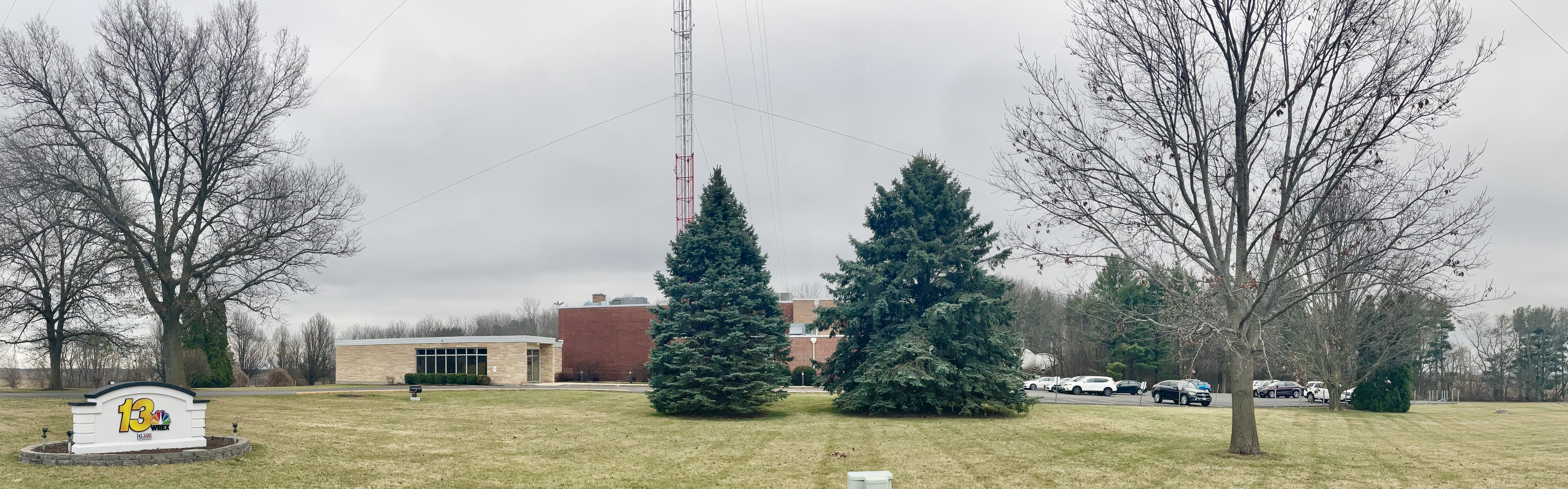
- The studios and transmitter of WREX on Auburn Road, 8 miles (13 km) west of Rockford.
- Rockford, Illinois; United States
- Channels: Digital: 13 (VHF); Virtual: 13
- Branding: WREX; Rockford News First

Programming
- Affiliations: 13.1: NBC; for others, see § Subchannels

Ownership
- Owner: Gray Media; (Gray Television Licensee, LLC)
- Sister stations: WIFR-LD, WSLN

History
- Founded: May 13, 1953
- First air date: October 1, 1953
- Former call signs: WREX-TV (1953–2009)
- Former channel numbers: Analog: 13 (VHF, 1953–2009); Digital: 54 (UHF, 2000–2009)
- Former affiliations: CBS (1953–1965); DuMont (secondary, 1953–1955); ABC (secondary 1953–1965, primary 1965–1995); NTA (secondary, 1956–1961); The CW (DT2, 2006–2021)
- Call sign meaning: In memory of Rex N. Caster, son of founding station president L. E. Caster

Technical information
- Licensing authority: FCC
- Facility ID: 73940
- ERP: 18 kW
- HAAT: 216 m (709 ft)
- Transmitter coordinates: 42°17′48″N 89°14′22″W

Links
- Public license information: Public file; LMS
- Website: www.rockfordnewsfirst.com

WREX (channel 13) is a television station in Rockford, Illinois, United States, affiliated with NBC. It is owned by Gray Media alongside CBS affiliate WIFR-LD (channel 23) and CW affiliate WSLN (channel 19). WREX's studios and transmitter are located on Auburn Road just west of Rockford.

WREX is the market's only full-power VHF station and is Rockford's second oldest television station.

== History ==
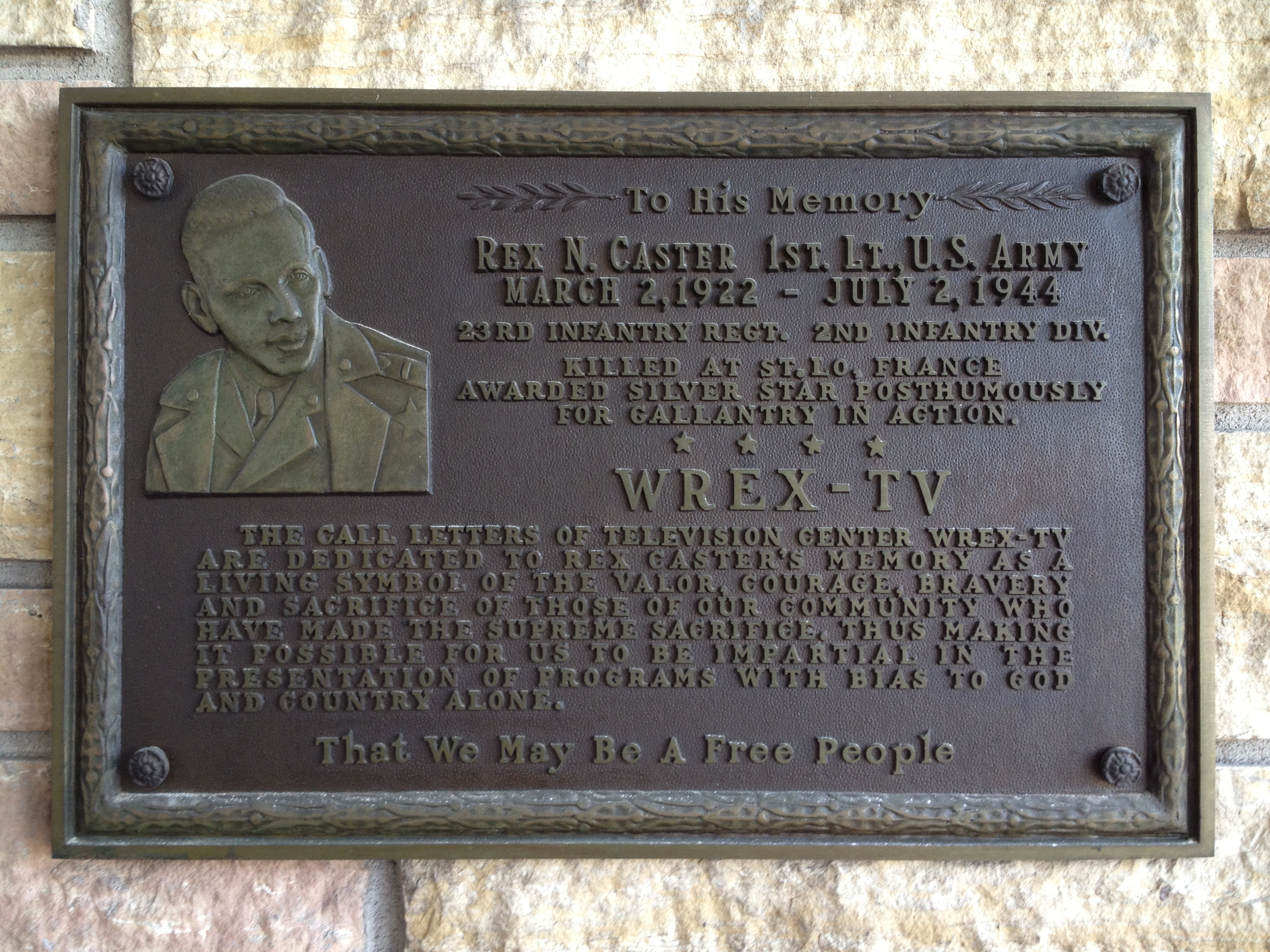
WREX was named in memory of 1st Lt. Rex N. Caster

WREX began operation on October 1, 1953, as a primary affiliate of CBS. It shared ABC with NBC affiliate WTVO, channel 17 (which signed on five months earlier), and also aired programming from the DuMont Television Network. It was owned by Greater Rockford Television, a group of local businessmen. The station's call letters were selected in honor of Rex N. Caster, the son of station president L. E. Caster. Rex Caster was a First Lieutenant in the United States Army who was killed in France during World War II.

Besides serving its immediate area, WREX attracted viewers early on in its history from parts of the neighboring Madison area. In fact, the two areas still share overlapping coverage among their television stations, especially in Rock County, Wisconsin (technically in the Madison television market), and that market's ABC affiliate, WKOW (channel 27) is a sister station to WREX, assisting with newsgathering in the northern part of the Rockford market. Until Madison's WISC-TV (channel 3) signed on in 1956, WREX was the only VHF station for both the Rockford and Madison areas. This was because Rockford and Madison were sandwiched between markets where other VHF channels were already assigned—Chicago (channels 2, 5, 7, 9, and 11) to the east; Milwaukee (channels 4, 6, 10, and 12) to the northeast; Davenport, Iowa–Rock Island, Illinois (Quad Cities) channels 4 and 6 (as well as 8 starting in August 1963) to the southwest; Cedar Rapids–Waterloo (channels 2, 7, and 9) to the west in eastern Iowa; and La Crosse–Eau Claire (channels 8 and 13) to the northwest, leaving room for only one VHF license in each market.

During the late 1950s, the station was also briefly affiliated with the NTA Film Network. The station lost DuMont when that network shut down in 1956. In 1963, the station was sold to the Gannett Company; during the mid-1960s, WREX was briefly co-owned with the Rockford Morning Star. WREX became a full-time ABC affiliate in 1965, when WCEE-TV signed on the air. In 1966, WREX became the first television station in Rockford to broadcast in color.

In 1969, Gannett sold WREX to the Gilmore Broadcasting Corporation, owner of WEHT in Evansville, Indiana. In 1987, Gilmore sold the station to ML Media Partners, L.P. In May 1995, Quincy Newspapers purchased WREX; the purchase was completed on July 31. Two weeks later, on August 14, WREX switched network affiliations with WTVO, taking that station's NBC affiliation while WTVO assumed WREX's old ABC affiliation. According to Variety, the affiliation switch was forced by ABC in retaliation for Quincy switching the affiliation of its South Bend station WSJV from ABC to Fox earlier that year.

Former logo for WREX, used from 2010 to 2026.

On January 7, 2021, Quincy Media announced that it had put itself up for sale. A few weeks later, Gray Television announced it would purchase Quincy for $925 million. While Gray already owned WIFR-LD, the market's CBS affiliate, FCC regulations permit the common ownership of a full-power and a low-power station in a single market. However, on April 29, Gray announced that WREX would be divested to Allen Media Group in a $380 million deal that includes, among other Quincy-owned stations, WKOW, WXOW in La Crosse, and WQOW in Eau Claire. The deal is expected to close during the third quarter of 2021. Though Gray would not have any direct ownership or control of WREX, one caveat of Allen Media's deal to acquire the station includes a 10-year agreement to carry WIFR-LD on a WREX subchannel, which would give WIFR full-market coverage for the first time since it went to low-power status in 2017.

On June 1, 2025, amid financial woes and rising debt, Allen Media Group announced that it would explore "strategic options" for the company, such as a sale of its television stations (including WREX). On August 8, 2025, it was announced that AMG would sell 13 of its stations, including WREX, to Gray Media for $171 million; in the Rockford market, this would create a de facto triopoly with WIFR-LD and WSLN. The sale was completed on May 1, 2026.

== News operation ==
WREX had a unique partnership with The Rockford Register Star, the city's daily newspaper. Staff of the newspaper would appear on WREX's news programs. In return, the newspaper promotes upcoming news stories and programming on Channel 13. WREX also has a partnership with Mid-West Family Broadcasting radio stations in the Rockford market. WREX provides weather reports for the stations and in return the radio stations provide promotion for WREX's programming.

WREX began to air newscasts in high-definition on December 12, 2010, the second in the Rockford market after WIFR and the third in the Quincy Newspapers station group after KWWL and WKOW.

On January 17, 2025, Allen Media Group announced plans to cut local meteorologist/weather forecaster positions from its stations, including WREX, and replacing them with a "weather hub" produced by The Weather Channel, which AMG also owns.

== Technical information ==
=== Subchannels ===
The station's signal is multiplexed:

Subchannels of WREX
Subchannel	Res.	Short name	Programming
13.1	1080i	WREXNBC	NBC
13.2	480i	MeTOONS	MeTV Toons
13.3	480i	WREXME	MeTV
13.4	480i	CourtTV	Court TV
13.5	480i	CRIME	True Crime Network
23.10	1080i	WREXCBS	CBS (WIFR-LD)

Simulcast of subchannels of another station

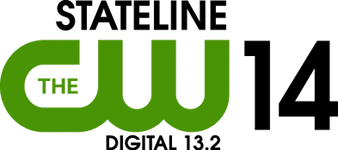
Former CW logo from 2006 to 2021.

WREX formerly operated Stateline CW, a digital broadcast affiliate of The CW via The CW Plus. Stateline CW was seen on channel 14 on DirecTV as well as most Rockford area cable systems.

On April 4, 2013, WREX added MeTV, on digital subchannel 13.3. Subchannels 13.4 and 13.5 went on the air with color bars on April 30, 2019, with Justice Network launching on 13.5 on May 1, and Court TV on 13.4 a week later.

=== Analog-to-digital conversion ===
WREX shut down its analog signal, over VHF channel 13, at 12:30 p.m. on February 17, 2009, the original target date on which full-power television stations in the United States were to transition from analog to digital broadcasts under federal mandate (which was later pushed back to June 12, 2009). The station's digital signal relocated from its pre-transition UHF channel 54, which was among the high band UHF channels (52–69) that were removed from broadcasting use as a result of the transition, to its analog-era VHF channel 13 for post-transition operations.

== See also ==
- Channel 13 digital TV stations in the United States
- Channel 13 virtual TV stations in the United States
- Channel 14 branded TV stations in the United States
