= WSEC =

Television station in Jacksonville, Illinois

- Jacksonville–Springfield, Illinois; United States
- City: Jacksonville, Illinois
- Branding: PBS WSIU

Programming
- Affiliations: PBS

Ownership
- Owner: Southern Illinois University
- Sister stations: WSIU-TV

Technical information
- Repeaters: WMEC 22 Macomb; WQEC 27 Quincy

Links
- Website: www.wsiu.org
- For more technical information, see § Stations.

WSEC (channel 14) is a PBS member television station licensed to Jacksonville, Illinois, United States. Owned by Southern Illinois University (SIU), it is a sister station to WSIU-TV in Carbondale. WSEC's transmitter is located south of Franklin, Illinois. SIU also owns WMEC (channel 22) in Macomb, with transmitter near Colchester, and WQEC (channel 27) in Quincy. WSEC, WMEC, and WQEC together serve a large rural area extending from Springfield in the east across the Mississippi River into portions of Missouri and Iowa.

West central Illinois and the Quad Cities still lacked public television service by the early 1970s. Proposals for a regional public television service and telecommunications facility connecting academic institutions evolved into the 1976 establishment of the West Central Illinois Educational Telecommunications Corporation, which adopted the short name Convocom, a hybrid of the words "convoke" and "communicate". Convocom's initial design featured microwave transmission facilities running from Springfield to the Quad Cities and broadcast transmitters at Jacksonville, the Quad Cities, and Peoria, where the existing station WTVP was involved in the project. Repeated vetoes of state funding, compounded by the 1978 collapse of the tower that was to transmit Convocom from Jacksonville, led the television plan to be scrapped in 1979 and spurred Black Hawk College, a Convocom member, to separately develop the Quad Cities station. In 1982, Convocom's television plans were revived with approvals for the present stations as WJPT, WIUM-TV, and WQEC, respectively. The Convocom microwave network, enabling two-way communication between colleges, entered into service in January 1984, and the television transmitters opened between August 1984 and March 1985. Convocom broadcast PBS programming and telecourses. Springfield, where Convocom had its offices, was served by cable only until a low-power translator there opened in 1990. The Convocom brand was de-emphasized in favor of the current call signs, adopted in 1989.

Convocom moved in 2001 to a studio near Glenwood High School in the Springfield suburb of Chatham. Three years later, it rebranded as Network Knowledge, having struggled throughout its history with brand visibility. The conversion from analog to digital television grew the network's potential audience but was a costly expenditure, as fundraising underperformed in its mostly rural service area, and ultimately contributed to its demise as a separate entity. It borrowed $5 million in 2002 to cover a quarter of the total costs, defaulted twice on loan conditions, and was in danger of losing access to most PBS programs, all while state and private giving support declined during the Great Recession.

Network Knowledge still owed $3.5 million when SIU acquired it in 2018. WSEC and satellites continued to have some separate local programming until 2022, when the last WSEC-specific local program, Illinois Stories, was discontinued. Today, it is part of the WSIU television footprint, which stretches across the southern third of Illinois.

== Convocom: Connecting Western Illinois ==
The Board of Governors of State Colleges and Universities authorized Western Illinois University (WIU) in Macomb and Black Hawk College in Moline to study plans for a jointly operated educational television station that would broadcast on channel 22 in Macomb and channel 24 in Moline, with a microwave transmission system connecting the two institutions and Bradley University in Peoria. Finding that they did not have the resources to execute what they wanted, the concept was expanded.

In January 1976, a consortium of higher education institutions in west central Illinois received a federal grant for an educational television network and transmission system. BHC, WIU, Sangamon State University (SSU) in Springfield, and the Illinois Valley Educational Television Corporation in Peoria, owner of that city's WTVP (channel 47), formed the West Central Illinois Educational Telecommunications Corporation. The system as planned would transmit through WTVP and two new stations: channel 14 at Jacksonville, transmitting from Bluffs, and channel 24 in the Quad Cities area, with studios in the Quad Cities, Macomb, Springfield, and Peoria. It would reach 2 million people in a 32,000-square-mile (83,000 km^{2}) area that was among the largest population centers yet unserved by a public TV station. The group filed to assume the application previously made by WIU in 1974 for the Moline station. It intended to be on the air by late 1978 with a system that permitted transmission of educational programming over the air and separate programming between institutions. In the evenings, the system would air PBS programs provided by WTVP, where an earth station already existed to receive PBS programs by satellite. The name of the consortium was unwieldy: Michael McGrevey of the Quad-City Times wrote, "That title is worse than the Iowa Educational Broadcast Network. They ought to just call these organizations something like 'Ralph' or 'Nancy'." In recognition that the 22-syllable name was "too cumbersome", in January 1978, the group renamed itself Convocom, after the words "convocation" and "communication".

Convocom's ambition to be on the air were slowed by financial and other difficulties. For the channel 14 station, Convocom intended to reuse the transmitter facility of the former commercial WJJY-TV, but it was toppled in a 1978 ice storm. Attempts to secure state funding in 1977 and 1978 were vetoed by governor Jim Thompson; state representative Sam McGrew attributed some of the problem of obtaining funding to the station's location in Forgottonia, an area often bypassed by state funding. When Thompson vetoed a third appropriations bill for Convocom in August 1979, network president George Hall claimed that Thompson announced he would not fund the system as long as he was in office. Hall declared, "The great educational TV desert of western Illinois will remain sandy."

During the next two years, Convocom pivoted to focusing on a microwave transmission link with the capacity of feeding cable television systems instead of broadcast stations. At the same time, Black Hawk College opted to move forward on its own with the Quad Cities public television station, which began operation in November 1983 as WQPT-TV. Though WQPT was run separately, BHC remained a member of Convocom and part of its network.

== Network construction and early years ==
Convocom received a $559,000 federal grant in January 1982 for construction of its telecommunications and public television network. While Convocom still would use WTVP to downlink PBS programs, there had been changes in the composition of the network, with transmitters in Macomb and Quincy added to the plan. The two-phase microwave construction plan foresaw connection of Bradley/WTVP, Western Illinois, and Sangamon State universities with Illinois College in Jacksonville, followed by the addition of Black Hawk College and Quincy to the network. In 1983, Jerold Gruebel, the former assistant programming director of the Indiana Higher Education Telecommunication System, was named Convocom's executive director.

On January 13, 1984, the first program was sent down the Convocom network from Bradley University to Macomb. The first Convocom television transmitter opened on August 22: WJPT (channel 14) from Jacksonville. WIUM-TV (channel 22) at Macomb began on October 1, and WQEC (channel 27) at Quincy signed on March 9, 1985. Originally on the air 20 hours a week, Convocom was providing 65 hours a week of broadcast programming by late 1985 and 105 by 1987. In addition to its broadcast offerings, Convocom member institutions enrolled hundreds of students in telecourses.

The network overlapped with the cable coverage of KETC from St. Louis and WILL-TV from Urbana. Convocom made an effort to counter-program most programs, airing them at different times.

One area of early attention for the network was Springfield, where Convocom was initially available on cable but not from a local broadcast transmitter. Gruebel cited a lack of public awareness as to its availability; to his dismay, many people thought of Convocom as a cable service even though it was broadcast in the rest of its territory. In 1989, two of the three stations received new call signs: WIUM-TV became WMEC and WJPT became WSEC, to identify them as the "educational channels" for Macomb and Springfield. In September 1989, Convocom received a federal grant to build translators in Springfield, one of only three state capitals without a broadcast signal from a PBS station, and in Kirksville, Missouri. Translator W65BV began operating on September 7, 1990. Coinciding with the new signal, the network began to play down the Convocom name. On July 1, 1995, new laws took effect that realigned the public higher educational structure in Illinois. The Board of Regents and Board of Governors were abolished, replaced with individual governing boards, and Sangamon State University was merged with the University of Illinois system as the University of Illinois at Springfield (UIS).

By the 1990s, the financial picture was beginning to change for Convocom. Cuts to federal funding for public broadcasting coincided with a change by PBS to require stations to pay for all PBS programming instead of only for programming they used. Where Convocom had only paid for 64 percent of PBS programming in the past, it now had to pay for the entirety of it. The station had 3,100 members and was supported by 5 percent of its viewers—about half the national average—and suffered from its lack of a connection to an educational institution and its rural service area. The Springfield translator moved to channel 8 in 2001, an attempt to improve WSEC's brand viability and the signal provided locally. At the same time, Convocom's headquarters moved off the UIS campus and to a new studio facility near Glenwood High School in Chatham (ending the use of Peoria as its reception point for programs), and it contracted with Oregon Public Broadcasting to schedule programs outside of prime time, in order to provide a more distinctive service compared to WILL-TV. More local programming was added with resources freed up by outsourcing scheduling to OPB.

== Digital transition and Network Knowledge rebrand ==
As early as the late 1990s, Gruebel worried about the impact that an expensive but mandated conversion to digital television would have on Convocom. After three attempts, in 2002, Convocom secured a grant from the National Telecommunications and Information Administration to offset costs associated with converting to digital television. To fund about one-quarter of its costs, the stations borrowed $5 million from Bank One, pledging all of its assets as collateral.

In 2004, WSEC and its satellites rebranded as Network Knowledge, as part of an effort to make the stations more visible in the community. At a press conference, Gruebel quipped of the old Convocom name, "It sounds like a diseased animal. Now, we never have to use that name again!"

Network Knowledge's financial condition continued to be precarious for years. In 2006, it defaulted on its loan and refinanced with Bank of America. Two years later, Gruebel warned of a cash flow crisis and that it could default a second time if it fell out of compliance with its loan covenants. A decline in its largest source of revenue, private giving from grants—compounded by the Great Recession—and a failure to land a grant from the Corporation for Public Broadcasting put Network Knowledge at risk of ceasing all local program production.

Even after the transition in 2009 and the switch to digital, which added a dozen counties and 400,000 people to its coverage area, Network Knowledge struggled. Between 2008 and 2013, Illinois cut state support for the network by 65 percent. Further cash was raised by the sale of the Quincy transmitter tower in 2010 and of land surrounding the Macomb transmitter in 2012. In 2013, it was forced to begin a fundraising appeal or be forced into a secondary status with PBS, which would have curtailed its ability to air new PBS programs. In 2016, the network announced major cutbacks in over-the-air broadcasting times to save money due to the Illinois state budget stand-off, along with other cuts from donors and production contracts. Starting on May 6, 2016, the network broadcast from 10 a.m. to 10 p.m. on weekdays and 10 a.m. to 11 p.m. on weekends. Cable and AT&T U-verse viewers were not affected, since the station continued to feed morning programs through a direct fiber optic link to Comcast.

== Sale to Southern Illinois University ==
On November 29, 2018, the West Central Illinois Educational Telecommunications Corporation announced that it had sold the three Network Knowledge stations to Southern Illinois University (SIU), which operates WSIU-FM-TV in Carbondale as well as its associated satellites, for $1.5 million. The deal took effect on November 1; longtime network president and CEO Jerold Gruebel gave up station management on November 1 and switched from full-time to part-time work about a month later. The sale was part of a larger partnership between Network Knowledge and WSIU that had been announced on October 26 in hopes of preserving public television in western and central Illinois. A State Journal-Register story said that viewers would not notice a difference in program quality but that viewers in the Network Knowledge territory would gain access to more national PBS programming.

Master control operations for WSIU and the former Network Knowledge were combined in an outsourcing agreement with Public Media Management in 2019. In 2022, both services began airing a combined schedule, and production of new editions of Illinois Stories was discontinued.

== Stations ==
WSEC and related satellites
Station	City of license	Channel; TV (RF)	FID	ERP	HAAT	Transmitter coordinates	First air date	Public license information
WSEC	Jacksonville	14 (18)	70536	75 kW	297 m (974 ft)	39°36′9″N 90°2′47″W	August 22, 1984	Public file; LMS
WMEC	Macomb	22 (36)	70537	75 kW	131 m (430 ft)	40°23′54″N 90°43′55″W	October 1, 1984	Public file; LMS
WQEC	Quincy	27 (34)	71561	58.6 kW	153 m (502 ft)	39°58′41″N 91°18′32″W	March 9, 1985	Public file; LMS

=== Subchannels ===
The stations' signals are multiplexed:

Subchannels of WSEC, WMEC, and WQEC
Subchannel			Res.	Short name			Programming
WSEC	WMEC	WQEC	Res.	WSEC	WMEC	WQEC	Programming
14.1	22.1	27.1	720p	WSEC-HD	WMEC-HD	WQEC-HD	PBS
14.2	22.2	27.2	480i	WORLD	WORLDSD		World (prime time) and other programming
14.3	22.3	27.3	480i	CREATE	CreatSD		Create
14.4	22.4	27.4	480i	KIDS247			PBS Kids

=== Analog-to-digital conversion ===
Two of the three Network Knowledge transmitters ceased analog broadcasts on February 17, 2009, the original digital television transition date, while WSEC converted on June 12, when all remaining full-service stations converted to digital. (Note: The Springfield translator, W08DP, never converted. Its license automatically expired on July 13, 2021, when all remaining low-power stations were required to convert to digital.) WSEC and WMEC further were repacked as a result of the 2016 United States wireless spectrum auction.

Network Knowledge digital transition and repack information
Station	Transition date	Pre- and post-transition channel	Post-repack channel
WSEC	June 12, 2009	15	18
WMEC	February 17, 2009	21	36
WQEC	February 17, 2009	34	—N/a
