= WIFR-LD =

Television station in Rockford, Illinois

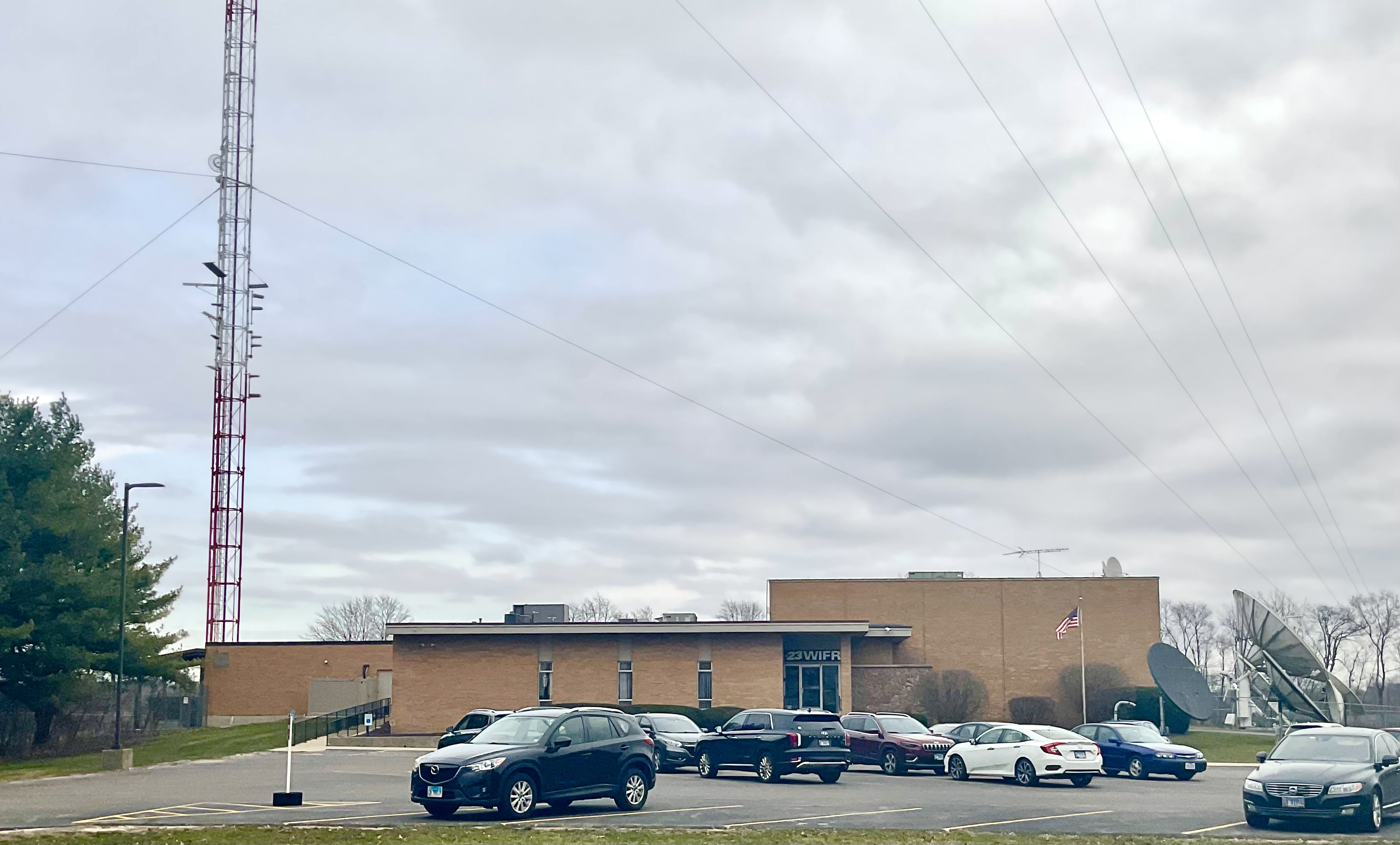
- WIFR's studios and transmitter west of Rockford on North Meridian Road.
- Rockford, Illinois; United States
- Channels: Digital: 28 (UHF); Virtual: 23
- Branding: WIFR, Rockford News First

Programming
- Affiliations: 23.1: CBS; for others, see § Subchannels

Ownership
- Owner: Gray Media; (Gray Television Licensee, LLC)
- Sister stations: WREX, WSLN

History
- Founded: May 17, 2011
- First air date: May 31, 2017
- Former call signs: W22EE-D (2011–2017) (Note: While the station was licensed as early as 2011, it had not been in operation until its purchase by Gray in 2017.)
- Former channel number: Digital: 41 (UHF, 2017–2020)
- Former affiliations: The CW Plus (23.5, 2021–2025)
- Call sign meaning: Wisconsin, Illinois, Freeport, Rockford

Technical information
- Licensing authority: FCC
- Facility ID: 183744
- Class: LD
- ERP: 15 kW
- HAAT: 215.8 m (708 ft)
- Transmitter coordinates: 42°17′48.3″N 89°10′15″W

Links
- Public license information: LMS
- Website: www.rockfordnewsfirst.com

WIFR
Former license
- Freeport–Rockford, Illinois; United States
- City: Freeport, Illinois
- Channels: Digital: 41 (UHF); Virtual: 23

Programming
- Affiliations: CBS

Ownership
- Owner: Gray Television; (Gray Television Licensee, LLC)

History
- First air date: September 12, 1965
- Last air date: May 31, 2017
- Former call signs: WCEE-TV (1965–1977); WIFR-TV (1977–1991); WIFR (1991–2017)
- Former channel numbers: Analog: 23 (UHF, 1965–2009); Digital: 41 (UHF, 2003–2017)

Technical information
- Licensing authority: FCC
- Facility ID: 4689
- ERP: 170 kW
- HAAT: 219.7 m (721 ft)
- Transmitter coordinates: 42°17′48″N 89°10′15″W

Links
- Public license information: Public file; LMS

WIFR-LD (channel 23) is a low-power television station in Rockford, Illinois, United States, affiliated with CBS. The station is owned by Gray Media alongside NBC affiliate WREX (channel 13) and CW affiliate WSLN (channel 19). WIFR-LD and WSLN maintain studios and transmitter facilities on North Meridian Road in Rockford.

Until 2017, WIFR operated as a full-power television station licensed to nearby Freeport, Illinois. Under its current low-power license, WIFR-LD continues to use channel 23 as its virtual channel. WIFR is the only television station in the Rockford market to retain the same network affiliation since it first signed on.

Since WIFR's over-the-air coverage area is effectively limited to Rockford itself and close-in suburbs in Winnebago County, it relies mostly on cable and satellite for its viewership. Its primary CBS channel is simulcast on a subchannel of WREX (VHF channel 13.6, mapped to virtual channel 23.10).

== History ==
The station went on the air as WCEE-TV on September 12, 1965. It was the third station in the Rockford market, and was originally locally owned by Rock River Television Corporation. The area's previous CBS affiliate, WREX-TV, switched to ABC full-time, sending CBS to WCEE-TV, whose calls and branding were inspired by the CBS Eyemark logo. It has been with CBS ever since, and is the only station in the market to have never switched affiliations. The call letters were changed to the present WIFR on June 1, 1977. General Media sold the station to Worrell Newspapers of Charlottesville, Virginia, in September of that year. Worrell sold all three stations WIFR, WHSV-TV in Harrisonburg, Virginia, and now-defunct WBNB-TV in the U.S. Virgin Islands to Benedek Broadcasting in 1986. When Benedek went bankrupt in 2002, WIFR and WHSV were acquired by current owner Gray Television.

On the morning of July 5, 2003, a severe wind storm swept through Rockford. WIFR's transmitter tower, located behind the studio and office building on North Meridian Road in Rockford, collapsed, with various sections of the tower falling harmlessly onto a field behind the studio facility and causing no damage to the building, nor any injuries. Four months later, a new tower was erected and WIFR's signal was restored to full power. The concrete guy footings of the former tower around the property have not been removed and remain in situ as removing them would be impractical and superfluous.

=== Spectrum reallocation ===
Gray Television sold WIFR's spectrum in the Federal Communications Commission (FCC)'s incentive auction for $50,060,965; at the time, the station indicated that it planned to enter into a post-auction channel sharing agreement. On April 21, 2017, Gray requested special temporary authority to move the license of W22EE-D (channel 22), a low-power station it owns in Rockford, to channel 41 with the intent of using it to maintain CBS service in the market; in its request, Gray disclosed that the full-power WIFR license would be surrendered on May 31, 2017, though WIFR's existing transmitter would be still be used, but with its power restricted to meet the transmitting requirements for W22EE-D. The full-power license was cancelled on that date. Gray had acquired W22EE-D from DTV America in an eight-station deal in 2016; it had never commenced any previous on-air operations since the call letters were issued on May 17, 2011, nor constructed any facilities.

On November 18, 2019, WIFR-LD attempted a transfer to its post-reallocation channel 28 from a temporary lower-power antenna lower on their transmitter tower, but moved back to 41 in a matter of days with the permission of T-Mobile, which would eventually hold that spectrum. This is due to channel 28 also being allocated to the northeast in Milwaukee to full-power ABC affiliate WISN-TV and causing cross-channel interference in portions of Boone and McHenry counties. The station again transitioned to channel 28 permanently on January 15, 2020, this time arranging with Weigel Broadcasting to simulcast 23.1 over their low-power station in the market, WFBN-LD (channel 35) as subchannel 23.11 to address those over-the-air viewers experiencing interference from WISN-TV. Gray's transition of WIFR-LD's regular higher-power signal at the former position of the channel 41 antenna was delayed several months from spring 2020 due to the COVID-19 pandemic causing a lack of tower maintenance crews across the United States.

Through all of this, on-air operations continued mostly unchanged, though viewers were asked to rescan their sets to continue watching the station. In practice, few viewers lost access to CBS programming due to the high penetration of cable and satellite, along with streaming options, including the station's livestream on CBS All Access/Paramount+.

=== Gray Television acquisition of Quincy Media ===
On February 1, 2021, Gray Television announced it had acquired Quincy Media, owner of NBC affiliate WREX, for $925 million in a cash transaction. FCC rules governing television duopolies permit the common ownership of a full-power station and a low-power station in the same market. Despite this, Gray elected to retain WIFR and sell WREX to Allen Media Broadcasting, a subsidiary of Los Angeles based Entertainment Studios, on April 29, in a $380 million transaction that included several of WREX's Quincy Media sister stations in overlapping markets, including WKOW/Madison, WAOW/Wausau, WXOW/La Crosse (and its semi-satellite WQOW/Eau Claire), KWWL/Waterloo–Cedar Rapids, and WSIL-TV/Carbondale (and its satellite KPOB-TV/Poplar Bluff). Gray hammered out a 10-year agreement with Allen Media which called for WREX to carry WIFR-LD's main channel on a WREX subchannel, which provides WIFR full-market coverage over-the-air. Gray would reacquire WREX on May 1, 2026, as part of its purchase of 13 Allen Media stations.

== Technical information ==
=== Subchannels ===
The station's signal is multiplexed:

Subchannels of WIFR-LD
Subchannel	Res.	Short name	Programming
23.1	1080i	WIFR	CBS
23.2	480i	Antenna	Antenna TV
23.3	480i	WIFROUT	Outlaw
23.4	480i	ION	Ion
23.6	480i	IONPLUS	Ion Plus
23.7	480i	DEFY	Defy

As noted in the last section, channel 23.11 is the fourth subchannel of Weigel Broadcasting's WFBN-LD (channel 35), which uses physical channel 23 post-spectrum.

WIFR added Tribune Broadcasting's Antenna TV as their second subchannel on December 17, 2012, replacing Local AccuWeather (known on-air as "23 WeatherNow"). The subchannel carries live local and regional sports, including Rockford IceHogs hockey. Until the 2020 move of all market sports rights to cable via NBC Sports Chicago and Marquee Sports Network, it carried the regional telecasts from WGN Sports of selected Chicago Bulls, Cubs, and White Sox games. On May 28, 2015, its third subchannel launched, taking an affiliation with the Justice Network on July 27; in the interim it carried that year's Rockford Public School District 205 graduation and overflow games unable to be aired on 23.2. 23.3 would carry White Sox games, with 23.2 carrying all Cubs games. During September 2017, WIFR announced via commercials running on the main signal that the subchannel would change affiliation to Cozi TV that month. 23.5 began carrying Stateline CW after it moved from WREX-DT2 in 2021; this would become expanded to a full-power signal on new station WSLN-TV on channel 19 upon its sign-on in 2023, though the station earlier continues to carry the 23.5 simulcast and the two stations are frequently co-branded in local promotional materials, most notably the WIFR website.

The Bulls and White Sox, alongside the Chicago Blackhawks (the team the IceHogs had been the minor league affiliate of since their American Hockey League promotion in 2007), would make a de facto return to the station in 2024, when their new Chicago Sports Network announced it would add an over-the-air affiliate in Rockford on the WSLN 19.3 subchannel, with 19.4 also carrying the network to accommodate potential overflow in a manner similar to how the WIFR subchannels had previously. On June 6, 2025, following Comcast's carriage agreement with CHSN, the network left the station.

=== Analog-to-digital conversion ===
WIFR shut down its analog signal, over UHF channel 23, at noon on February 17, 2009, the original target date on which full-power television stations in the United States were to transition from analog to digital broadcasts under federal mandate (which was later pushed back to June 12, 2009). The station's digital signal remained on its pre-transition UHF channel 41, using virtual channel 23.
