= WTVP =

Television station in Peoria, Illinois

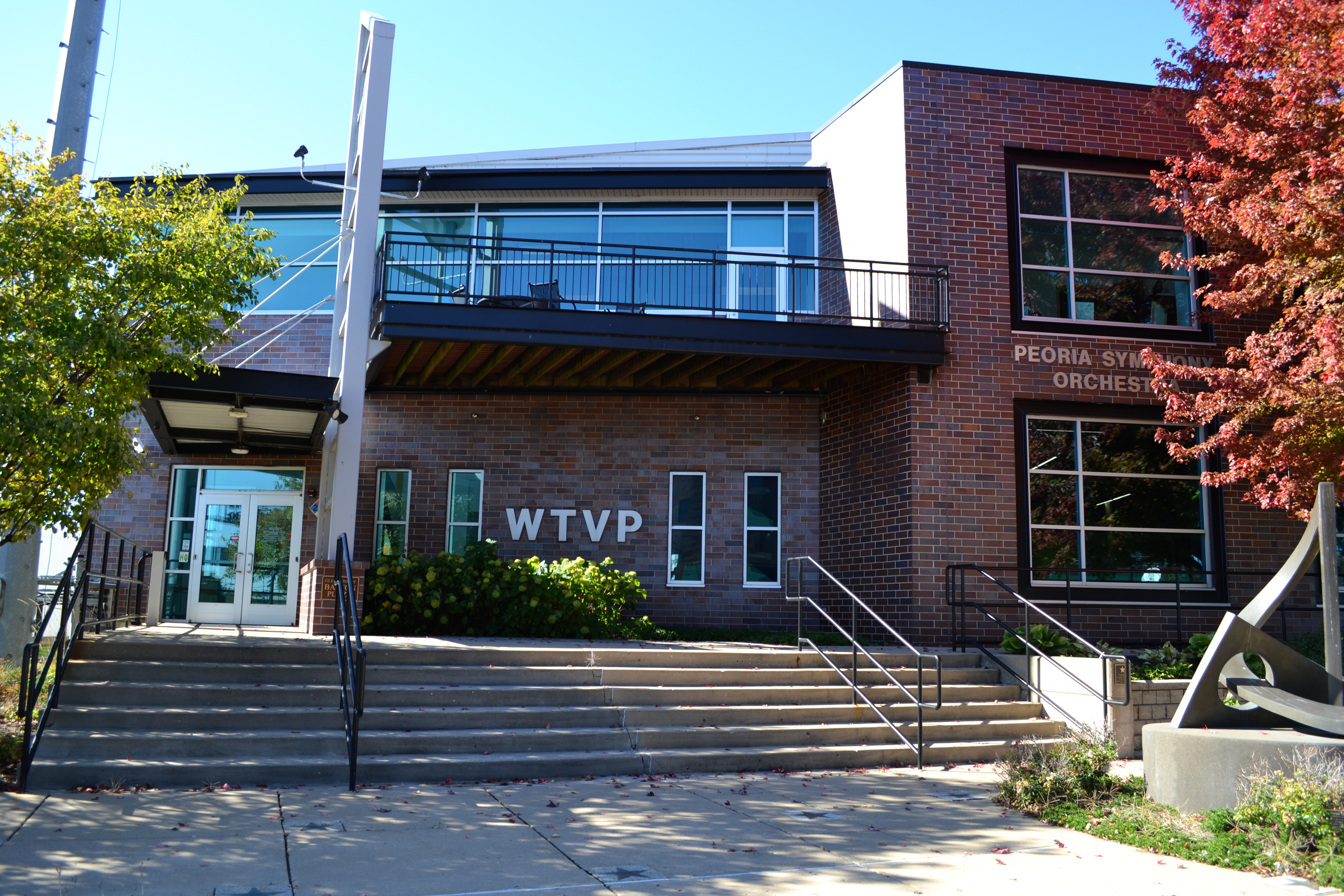
- WTVP studios on State Street in downtown Peoria
- Peoria–Bloomington–Normal, Illinois; United States
- Channels: Digital: 35 (UHF); Virtual: 47
- Branding: WTVP PBS

Programming
- Affiliations: 47.1: PBS; for others, see § Subchannels

Ownership
- Owner: Illinois Valley Public Telecommunications Corporation

History
- First air date: June 27, 1971
- Former channel numbers: Analog: 47 (UHF, 1971–2009); Digital: 46 (UHF, until 2020)
- Call sign meaning: Television Peoria

Technical information
- Licensing authority: FCC
- Facility ID: 28311
- ERP: 155 kW
- HAAT: 213.8 m (701 ft)
- Transmitter coordinates: 40°37′45″N 89°34′13″W

Links
- Public license information: Public file; LMS
- Website: www.wtvp.org

WTVP (channel 47) is a PBS member television station in Peoria, Illinois, United States, owned by the Illinois Valley Public Telecommunications Corporation. The station's studios are located on State Street in downtown Peoria, and its transmitter is located along Interstate 474 in East Peoria.

Serving as the Peoria area's public television station since 1971, WTVP broadcasts PBS and local programming. Originally housed on studios at the campus of Bradley University but separately owned, WTVP moved to its present facility in 2003. However, borrowing costs from construction and insufficient pledge revenues led to a near-foreclosure and shutdown of the station in January 2008 by its lender. Sufficient support from the community allowed WTVP to settle its debts and remain on the air. In 2023, a financial crisis was revealed at the station following the suicide of its general manager.

== History ==
=== Early years ===
In February 1969, Bradley University (BU) had applied to the Federal Communications Commission (FCC) seeking authority to build an educational TV station in Peoria; it had experience in educational television, broadcasting over closed-circuit and microwave systems to 30,000 students in 100 schools by 1967. Instead of seeking the channel alone, the university opted to form the Illinois Valley Public Telecommunications Corporation with five local community groups: Lakeview Museum of Arts and Sciences, Peoria Public Schools, Peoria Public Library, Pekin Public Schools, and Illinois Central College. The new corporation filed on March 10, 1970, for permission to build an educational television station on channel 47 in Peoria. Phil Weinberg, an academic dean at Bradley University, arranged for Sesame Street to be aired locally by commercial station WMBD-TV prior to the station's launch.

WTVP began broadcasting on June 27, 1971. For the next 25 years, it was managed by Elwin Basquin, who was named to the station manager post shortly after sign-on and rose to general manager and president in the late 1980s; Basquin remained with WTVP until his retirement in 1996. During that time, in 1993, a new transmission facility was built, extending coverage to another 275,000 homes.

=== Downtown move and near-foreclosure ===
In 2000, WTVP announced a large fundraising campaign, "Funds for FortySeven", to finance its conversion to digital television and a move off the Bradley campus to a warehouse on State and Water streets in downtown Peoria; the existing quarters at Bradley were cramped for the station, which had to split its staff between two offices. During this time, in January 2002, WTVP became the region's first station to begin digital TV transmissions. The riverfront facility, about 30,000-square-foot (2,800 m^{2}) in size, opened in July 2003 at a cost of $4 million for the building and $5 million more in digital equipment.

However, the financial cost of the move, particularly in borrowing, proved to be a major issue for the station, which had benefited for 32 years from rent-free space on the BU campus. The facility had been paid for by $10.3 million in bonds; in 2005, WTVP was found to be in technical default after failing to meet covenants related to pledge goals despite continuing to pay down the bonds. Other issues included the bond agreement, signed amid a recession, and an inability to secure federal grants to pay for the digital conversion that WTVP had already financed with its own money. In December, Bank of America—the primary lender—issued WTVP a deadline of January 15, 2008, to restructure the agreement with $6.9 million still owing on the bonds. For WTVP, this was an existential crisis, as Bank of America indicated that it would foreclose on and put WTVP's assets up for sale; to avoid this fate, WTVP would have to raise about as much money in six weeks as it had in six years. It instead aimed for a $2 million goal, which it believed would be sufficient to permit a restructuring of the bonds.

As 2007 turned to 2008, WTVP had secured $1.4 million. A final offer of $4 million cash, backed by the pledges as well as remaining cash reserves, a loan from National City Bank, and the Illinois Facilities Fund, was made—even though WTVP officials felt the bank had not negotiated in good faith—and rejected. The banks eventually indicated they would agree to be paid a higher amount, requiring further fundraising, and a tentative deal for a $5.25 million payment was made—but WTVP had to raise another $450,000 by February 28 for the deal to hold. The money was raised with a day to spare. Of the money raised from viewers, 70 percent came from first-time donors.

WTVP shut down its analog signal, over UHF channel 47, at 11:59 p.m. on February 17, 2009, the original target date on which full-power television stations in the United States were to transition from analog to digital broadcasts under federal mandate (which was later pushed back to June 12, 2009). The station's digital signal remained on its pre-transition UHF channel 46, using virtual channel 47.

=== Joint management experiment with WILL and 2023 financial crisis ===
In 2013, WTVP entered into a joint management agreement with Illinois Public Media, the public media service of the University of Illinois Urbana-Champaign. Chet Tomczyk, WTVP's president and CEO, was named interim general manager of Illinois Public Media's WILL stations. Tomczyk retired the next year, and Maurice "Moss" Bresnahan was named president and CEO of both organizations, reporting to the University of Illinois and the Illinois Valley Public Telecommunications Corporation board. The dual leadership arrangement was a prelude to a possible merger, though WTVP ultimately sought to keep its local identity and ended the agreement in 2019 to seek its own executive while continuing programming and other collaborations with WILL. Also in 2014, WTVP began managing master control functions for WQPT, the public television station of Western Illinois University-Quad Cities in Moline. Involvement of WTVP with other public broadcasting in west-central Illinois had first been envisioned in the 1970s when planners linked WTVP to the Convocom educational consortium, whose public television station went on the air as an independent project and is now WSEC in Springfield.

WTVP launched WTVP Remote (47.5), a subchannel with educational content for K-12 students, during the COVID-19 pandemic in May 2020. The next year, it acquired the assets of Peoria Magazine, a monthly publication that was being discontinued by its publisher, and the annual business events it organized.

On September 27, 2023, Lesley Matuszak, the station's director, resigned from her position. The next day, she died at the age of 66 in what was later confirmed to be a suicide. Shortly after Matuszak's death, it became apparent that the station had financial issues when it moved to cut $1.5 million from its budget due to what it called "questionable, unauthorized or improper" use of funds; the station had lost money in fiscal year 2022 and was projected to lose more in fiscal year 2023. Police later found that there would have been probable cause to charge Matuszak with embezzlement and forgery; she paid for personal expenses, including jewelry and political donations, using station funds and forged a donor's signature on an invoice for jewelry. As a result, nine employees were laid off, and the station announced Peoria Magazine would cease publication "for the foreseeable future" with its November 2023 issue. The Illinois Attorney General's Office and the Peoria Police Department opened investigations into the station's spending. Additionally, the station requested interim funding from the Corporation for Public Broadcasting (CPB), which decided to refer the matter to its internal inspector general and halted the disbursement of the station's Community Service Grant pending the review.

Eleven members of WTVP's board of directors, including the chair and vice chair, resigned in January 2024. In the wake of the resignations, 13 new board members were designated, including Republican state senator Win Stoller and former president and CEO Chet Tomczyk. The new board chair, John Wieland, began offering an apology to viewers; he noted in interviews that the criminal investigation into the station centered on misuse of funds, not embezzlement, and that a surge in existing donations would keep the station from going under. The Cincinnati Insurance Company, WTVP's insurer, sued the estate of Matuszak and former WTVP finance director Linda McLaughlin in March 2025, seeking to recover its costs for the embezzlement claim it paid out. The next month, WTVP received $1.6 million in previously frozen CPB funding from the 2024 and 2025 fiscal years after filing a corrective action plan.

== Local programming ==
Local programs from WTVP include At Issue, a weekly public affairs series, as well as agriculture program A Shot of Ag with Rob Sharkey and the music performance series State & Water, in addition to documentaries and other special programs.

WTVP was the first local station to telecast Bradley Braves men's basketball with its broadcasts of the opening three home games of the 1979–80 season, while the station was housed on the university's campus. More recently, the station broadcast up to ten men's home games per season from the 2006–07 through 2011–12 seasons. The station was also the first broadcaster of Bradley women's basketball, averaging four home games per year starting in the 1996–97 season. All basketball coverage was dropped for the 2012–13 season due to mounting financial losses.

== Subchannels ==
WTVP's transmitter is located along Interstate 474 in East Peoria. The station's signal is multiplexed:

Subchannels of WTVP
Subchannel	Res.	Short name	Programming
47.1	1080i	WTVP-HD	PBS
47.2	480i	WTVP-KD	PBS Kids
47.3	480i	World	World
47.4	480i	Create	Create
47.5	480i	Remote	WTVP Remote
