= WSLN =

Television station in Freeport, Illinois

- Freeport–Rockford, Illinois; United States
- City: Freeport, Illinois
- Channels: Digital: 9 (VHF); Virtual: 19
- Branding: Stateline CW

Programming
- Affiliations: 19.1: The CW Plus; for others, see § Subchannels

Ownership
- Owner: Gray Media; (Gray Television Licensee, LLC)
- Sister stations: WREX, WIFR-LD

History
- First air date: September 25, 2023
- Call sign meaning: "Stateline"

Technical information
- Licensing authority: FCC
- Facility ID: 776220
- ERP: 30 kW
- HAAT: 218.2 m (716 ft)
- Transmitter coordinates: 42°17′48.3″N 89°10′15″W

Links
- Public license information: Public file; LMS

WSLN (channel 19) is a television station licensed to Freeport, Illinois, United States, serving the Rockford area as an affiliate of The CW (via The CW Plus). It is owned by Gray Media alongside NBC affiliate WREX (channel 13) and CBS affiliate WIFR-LD (channel 23). WSLN and WIFR-LD share studios and transmitter facilities on North Meridian Road in Rockford.

The CW affiliation in Rockford originated on WREX-DT2 in 2006 before moving to WIFR in 2021. WSLN signed on in 2023, taking over the CW Plus service as a full-power station.

== History ==
=== Stateline CW on WREX-DT2 ===
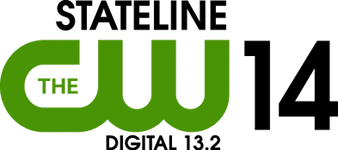
Stateline CW logo used from 2006 to 2021 as a WREX subchannel.

The CW affiliation in the Rockford market originally launched in 2006 as Stateline CW on WREX's second digital subchannel (DT2). WREX branded the service as Stateline CW 14, which was carried on channel 14 on most Rockford-area cable systems and on WREX digital subchannel 13.2. The station inserted local news/weather updates and syndicated programming around the CW Plus network feed. News and weather updates also aired throughout the day on Stateline CW 14.

=== Move to WIFR subchannel (2021) ===
In 2021, Gray Television announced it would acquire Quincy Media, which owned WREX and its CW Plus subchannel. To comply with FCC ownership rules, Gray divested WREX's NBC license to Allen Media Group later that year, but retained the CW Plus affiliation for the Rockford market. As a result, the CW service was moved to a subchannel of WIFR (23.5). Under the terms of the divestiture, Allen Media and Gray also reached a 10-year agreement allowing WREX to carry WIFR's signal on one of its own subchannels, ensuring full-market coverage for WIFR despite its low-power status.

=== Launch of WSLN (2023) ===
On September 25, 2023, WIFR aired an announcement in their newscasts urging viewers to rescan their televisions to add WSLN. Channel 19 serves as a de facto replacement for WIFR's former full-power license, which was turned in during 2017 as part of the 2016 FCC spectrum incentive auction, with Gray winning the subsequent re-allocation auction for a new Freeport full-power station that would be WSLN. In the announcement, WIFR and Gray Television stated that "23 WIFR and Gray Media are bringing a new channel to the Stateline area... channel 19 WSLN... which will be the new home of the Stateline CW, Circle Network, and Antenna TV". The message also explained that the three networks would move from WIFR's lineup to WSLN "to help increase viewership and give the channels more cable and satellite access". The station emphasized that WIFR's CBS and local news programming would remain unchanged on channel 23 due to the WREX arrangement. Gray has since proposed to purchase that station from Allen Media Group in the summer of 2025, a deal that closed on May 1, 2026.

== Technical information ==
=== Subchannels ===
The station's signal is multiplexed:

Subchannels of WSLN
Subchannel	Res.	Short name	Programming
19.1	720p	CW	CW Plus
19.2	720p	WSLN365	365BLK
19.3	480i	WXPLUS	24/7 Local Weather

When WSLN signed on September 25, 2023, it launched with three subchannels: The CW Plus on 19.1, Circle on 19.2, and Antenna TV on 19.3.

After Circle ended its over-the-air service at the end of 2023, WSLN replaced the 19.2 subchannel with 365BLK in early 2024.

On October 1, 2024, WSLN added the Chicago Sports Network (CHSN) on 19.3, with an overflow channel branded CHSN Plus on 19.4. To make room for CHSN, Antenna TV was relocated from WSLN to WIFR 23.2. CHSN ceased its over-the-air distribution in northern Illinois on June 9, 2025, after acquiring full coverage on Xfinity systems. An automated weather station from WIFR replaced it on WSLN-DT3.
