= WEIU (FM) =

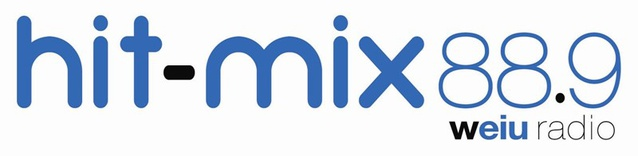

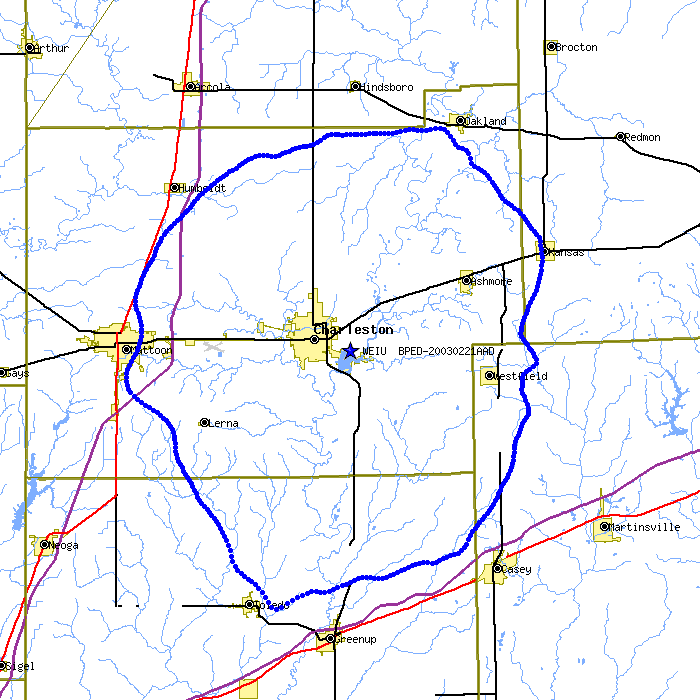
- WEIU contour map
- Charleston, Illinois; United States
- Frequency: 88.9 MHz
- Branding: Hit Mix

Programming
- Format: Variety

Ownership
- Owner: Eastern Illinois University

History
- First air date: 1982
- Call sign meaning: Eastern Illinois University

Technical information
- Licensing authority: FCC
- Facility ID: 18299
- Class: B1
- ERP: 4,000 watts
- HAAT: 51 meters (167 ft)
- Transmitter coordinates: 39°28′43.1″N 88°10′21.1″W

Links
- Public license information: Public file; LMS
- Website: www.weiu.net

WEIU (88.9 FM) is a 4,000 watt effective radiated power radio station in Charleston, Illinois. Owned by Eastern Illinois University (EIU). The station has it's studios on the EIU campus in Charleston. The station licensee, Eastern Illinois University is authorized by the Federal Communications Commission. The station first signed on in 1982.

== See also ==
- Campus radio
- List of college radio stations in the United States
