= WSIU (FM) =

- Carbondale, Illinois; United States
- Broadcast area: Southern Illinois
- Frequency: 91.9 MHz
- Branding: Powered by You

Programming
- Format: News/talk; classical music
- Affiliations: American Public Media; National Public Radio; Public Radio Exchange

Ownership
- Owner: Southern Illinois University-Carbondale; (Board of Trustees, Southern Illinois University)
- Sister stations: WSIU-TV

History
- First air date: September 15, 1958
- Former call signs: WSRV (1958–1960)
- Call sign meaning: Southern Illinois University

Technical information
- Licensing authority: FCC
- Facility ID: 61309
- Class: B
- ERP: 50,000 watts
- HAAT: 91.0 meters (298.6 ft)
- Transmitter coordinates: 37°42′29.00″N 89°14′5.00″W

Links
- Public license information: Public file; LMS
- Webcast: Listen live
- Website: www.wsiu.org

WSIU (91.9 FM, "Powered by You") is a radio station broadcasting a news/talk/information and classical music format. Licensed to Carbondale, Illinois, the station serves Southern Illinois. The station is currently owned by Southern Illinois University Carbondale and features programming from American Public Media, National Public Radio, and Public Radio Exchange. Programming originating from WSIU includes Celtic Connections, a Celtic music show.

WSIU's programming is also heard on WUSI 90.3 FM in Olney, Illinois, and WVSI 88.9 FM in Mount Vernon, Illinois.

WSIU first took to the air on September 15, 1958, as WSRV (Southern's Radio Voice). It became WSIU in 1960.
