= Hale Stadium =

Stadium in Nashville, Tennessee

- The Hole
- Interactive map of Hale Stadium
- Address: 3500 John Merritt Blvd; Nashville, Tennessee; United States of America
- Coordinates: 36°10′5″N 86°49′37″W
- Owner: Tennessee State University
- Operator: Tennessee State University
- Capacity: 10,000
- Surface: Natural grass

Construction
- Opened: 1953
- Closed: 1999
- Reopened: 2012

Tenants
- Tennessee State Tigers (1953–1998, 2012–present); Nashville Diamonds (ASL) (1982)

Website
- Hale Stadium

Hale Stadium is a 10,000-seat outdoor stadium located on the campus of Tennessee State University in Nashville, Tennessee. Built in 1953 and nicknamed "The Hole", the stadium hosted TSU Tigers football games until 1999, when home games were moved to what is now Nissan Stadium, home of the Tennessee Titans. Allowing the Tigers to play their home games at the new venue was a requirement for the funding the new facility received from the State of Tennessee. After the move, Hale fell into a state of disrepair.

== History ==
The facility was named for William J. Hale, who served as TSU's first president. Hale Stadium hosted a second-round NCAA Division I-AA playoff game in 1982, with the Tigers defeating Eastern Illinois University 20–19 in front of a crowd of 8,000.

During its years at Hale, TSU went undefeated ten times, won ten championships in the now-defunct Midwestern Conference and claimed the Ohio Valley Conference championship in 1998, its final season in the stadium.

The last Tennessee State football game at Hale Stadium before moving to LP Field was a 28–14 win over Texas Southern University on November 21, 1998. However, the facility is still used for the annual Blue-White game held at the close of the Tigers' spring practice.

=== Renovations ===
The stadium was renovated before the 2012 season to celebrate the university's centennial, and was reopened in time for the Tigers' game against Austin Peay. The Tigers now split their home games between Hale Stadium and Nissan Stadium.
