= WJJY-TV =

Television station in Jacksonville, Illinois (1969–1971)

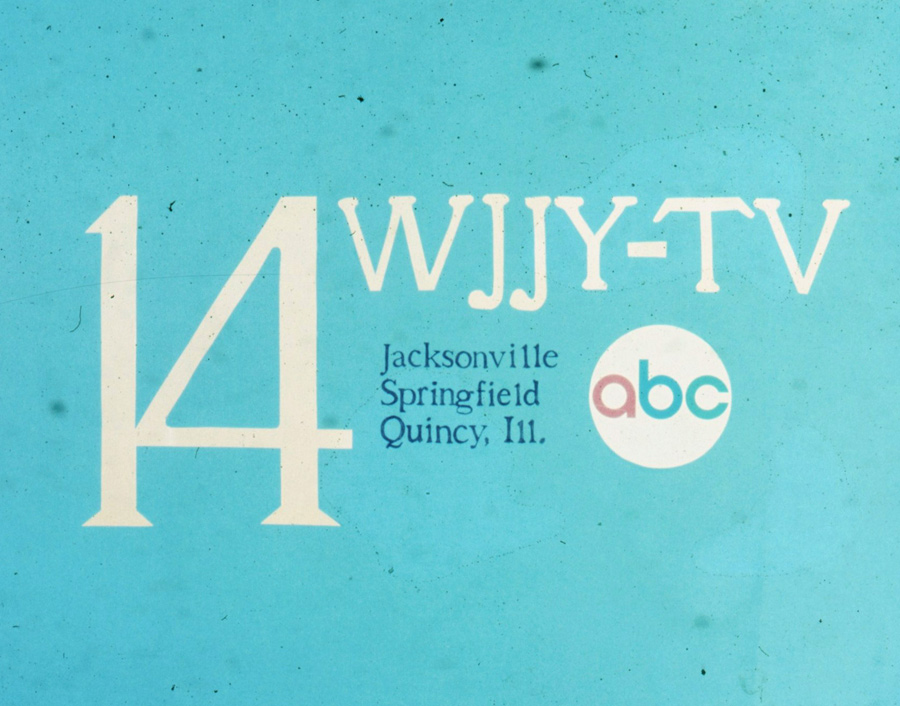
- Jacksonville–Quincy–Springfield, Illinois; United States
- City: Jacksonville, Illinois
- Channels: Analog: 14 (UHF)

Programming
- Affiliations: ABC

Ownership
- Owner: Look Television Corporation

History
- First air date: August 18, 1969
- Last air date: September 15, 1971

Technical information
- ERP: 4,320 kW
- HAAT: 483 m (1,585 ft)
- Transmitter coordinates: 39°45′52″N 90°30′27″W

WJJY-TV (channel 14) was a television station in Jacksonville, Illinois, United States, which broadcast from 1969 to 1971. It was the ABC affiliate for Quincy, Illinois, and served Springfield as well. Owned by Look Television Corporation, the station was poorly capitalized and a financial failure, closing two years after it debuted. Its tower at Bluffs, Illinois—the tallest structure in the state—stood until it collapsed in a 1978 ice storm.

== History ==
On March 31, 1966, the Federal Communications Commission (FCC) authorized the Moyer Television Corporation, owned by former WTIM owner Keith Moyer, to build a new television station on channel 14 in Jacksonville, Illinois. The permit was assigned the next year to the Look Television Corporation. That year, the station said it was unsuccessful in obtaining an affiliation with either CBS or ABC. An ABC spokesman noted that four affiliates—from St. Louis (KTVI), Decatur (WAND), Moline (WQAD-TV), and Peoria (WIRL-TV)—already saturated the proposed station's coverage area.

By 1969, construction on the new station had been completed. WJJY-TV's tower—the tallest structure in the state of Illinois—was located near Bluffs and rose 1,610 feet (490 m) and weighed 350.5 tons. The 126-foot (38 m), 26-ton antenna was the largest ever built and sent out an effective radiated power of 4.32 million watts — much higher than the other ultra high frequency stations in central Illinois.

WJJY-TV began broadcasting on August 18, 1969, after a 17-day delay due to a partial antenna failure. It was an affiliate of ABC and, from its studios on West Walnut Street, aired local programming including news; Questionable Matters, a debate program featuring three professors at Illinois College; and a morning program, The Morning Show. In addition to ABC and local programs, as well as St. Louis Cardinals baseball, WJJY-TV broadcast educational television for schools in cooperation with the West Central Illinois Educational Television Association, a consortium of school districts; the station's signal reached some 400 districts.

By early 1971, the station was struggling financially. The local electrical utility cut power on several occasions for nonpayment but turned the power back on so that the tall tower could be properly lighted. Moyer ceased involvement with Look Television in April 1971. At that time, the other investors in Look began searching for a buyer, but with insufficient cash, they could not continue to keep WJJY-TV on the air. It closed on September 15, 1971. The other investors blamed Moyer for the station's problems. Moyer's financial problems prompted him to withdraw plans for a similar station on channel 17 in Columbia, Missouri.

After it left the air, WJJY-TV was implicated in a bribery scandal involving ABC affiliations. The FCC designated WJJY-TV's broadcast license renewal for hearing in November 1971. At that time, Look's investors were looking for a buyer for the station. The investigation revealed that Moyer had paid $20,000 as a bribe to an alias for a regional director for ABC in exchange for the affiliation. Moyer made the payment because he was trying to get ABC to provide a clean signal instead of having to rely on WAND in Decatur as its source of network programming. An FCC administrative law judge ruled in 1973 that the renewal should be granted, finding the station not guilty of improper motive. No buyer ever came forward for the license, leading it to be canceled in February 1974. Investor A. W. Applebee told the Decatur Herald that the station was "a very expensive and very sad experience for many of us here in Jacksonville. It was a case of overpromotion and undercapitalization."

RCA Corporation had ownership interests in the tower at Bluffs. Much of the studio equipment, supplied by RCA, was repossessed and sold. The tower was intended to be used for the new Convocom educational television network, but it collapsed in an ice storm on March 26, 1978.
