= WEIU-TV =

Television station in Charleston, Illinois (1986–2026)

- Charleston, Illinois; United States
- Channels: Digital: 30 (UHF); Virtual: 51
- Branding: WEIU; News Watch

Programming
- Affiliations: Educational Independent (1986–1991, 2025–2026); PBS (1992–2025)

Ownership
- Owner: Eastern Illinois University
- Sister stations: WEIU (FM)

History
- First air date: July 1, 1986
- Last air date: May 15, 2026
- Former channel numbers: Analog: 51 (UHF, 1986–2009); Digital: 50 (UHF, 2006–2019)
- Call sign meaning: Eastern Illinois University

Technical information
- Licensing authority: FCC
- Facility ID: 18301
- ERP: 174 kW
- HAAT: 141 m (463 ft)
- Transmitter coordinates: 39°34′15″N 88°18′25.5″W

Links
- Public license information: Public file; LMS
- Website: www.weiu.net

WEIU-TV (channel 51) was an educational television station in Charleston, Illinois, United States. Owned by Eastern Illinois University (EIU), it shared studios with campus radio station WEIU (88.9 FM) at Buzzard Hall on the EIU campus on 9th Street in Charleston; WEIU-TV's transmitter was located near Humboldt, Illinois. WEIU-TV's coverage area extended south to Effingham, north to Champaign, west to Decatur, and east to Terre Haute, Indiana.

The station began broadcasting on July 1, 1986, though EIU had been producing programming for local cable systems since 1981. It marked the culmination of a five-year effort to build radio and television stations on the campus. At launch, WEIU-TV was one of two educational independent stations not affiliated with PBS; it aired programming from the Financial News Network and The Learning Channel with commercials removed as well as a local newscast, News Scan (later known as News Watch). WEIU-TV joined PBS on January 1, 1992, and was part of its Program Differentiation Plan, airing a partial national schedule in an area already serviced by WILL-TV and WUSI-TV. The station offered alternative public media programming and local programming, including News Watch and Eastern Illinois University sports coverage.

In 2025, Congress rescinded funding for the Corporation for Public Broadcasting, which represented a third of the station's revenue. As a result, WEIU-TV disaffiliated from PBS. It ceased broadcasting and went dark on May 15, 2026, with News Watch to continue as a live-streamed program during the fall and spring semesters.

== History ==
=== Construction and early years ===
In 1980, a study committee recommended that Eastern Illinois University (EIU) establish an on-campus television studio, to produce programming for local cable TV, and an FM radio station, to support a radio and television curriculum on the campus. In 1981, EIU began broadcasting programming to the cable television system in Charleston. By 1984, EIU was broadcasting 90 hours a week on cable to Charleston and systems in Ashmore, Kansas, and Westfield. Local sports, classic films, and material from BizNet, a service of the United States Chamber of Commerce, were offered. Later, the channel included programming from the Financial News Network (FNN).

Though construction plans for the radio station were delayed for budgetary reasons, in June 1984, EIU applied to the Federal Communications Commission (FCC) to build a broadcast television station on channel 51 to air the programming distributed by cable within a 24-mile (39 km) radius of the campus. John Beabout, director of the radio-television center at EIU, noted that the station would not be redundant to public stations WILL-TV in Urbana or WUSI-TV in Olney, both of which were received in the area: "We're not another public TV station, and we have no intention of duplicating their services." In April 1985, the FCC granted the construction permit for WEIU-TV, and the Board of Governors of State Colleges and Universities in November approved the purchase of the equipment to outfit the transmitter facility. Ahead of the launch of broadcast operations, on January 20, 1986, EIU began airing a nightly local newscast, News Scan 51, produced by students.

WEIU-TV began broadcasting on July 1, 1986, exactly a year after WEIU (88.9 FM) and five years from the establishment of the Radio-Television Center. Non-local programming consisted of content from FNN and The Learning Channel with the commercials removed as well as classic TV series. The goal was to fill two voids: local programming for a largely rural area and family-friendly programming in prime time. At the time, WEIU-TV was one of only two educational television stations in the U.S. to be independent of PBS. In 1988, when WEIU sought to air the 1959–1963 series The Untouchables, the Board of Governors refused permission because of the program's outdated and prejudiced treatment of Italian Americans. Later that year, an excerpt of News Scan was shown nationally on Nightline when Dan Quayle visited EIU. In addition to News Scan, WEIU-TV produced public affairs programming and shows on Eastern Illinois University sports. In its early years, the station struggled to get carriage on local cable systems, having come on the air after a federal court struck down must-carry rules. News Scan aired two daily live editions until 1990, when it switched to a single early evening edition.

=== Affiliation with PBS and digital conversion ===
On January 1, 1992, WEIU-TV joined PBS with 10 hours a week of the network's programming, 90% differentiated from WILL-TV and WUSI-TV. The next year, News Scan became a partnership with Mid-Illinois Newspapers, publishers of the Mattoon Journal Gazette and Charleston Times-Courier, with newspaper reporters anchoring while students continued to produce the stories. With the launch of the Ready to Learn grant program in 1995, WEIU-TV was able to expand its daytime children's programming lineup. Intermittently, the station aired EIU sports events, including home football games and the occasional road game. At one point between 1996 and 1999, WEIU went three years without telecasting a basketball game because the university's athletic director believed television exposure hurt attendance.

By 1998, WEIU-TV was one of the least-viewed PBS stations in the United States. In 2001, Rick Sailors was named general manager of WEIU-TV. He increased the amount of classic TV series on the station's lineup, emphasized PBS's educational offerings and dropped the MacNeil–Lehrer NewsHour, and introduced new local non-news programs to accompany WEIU's news. From 2003 to 2014, the station covered home games of EIU football, basketball, and baseball. In 2005, WEIU-TV began programming Your 13, a channel available on the local video service of Consolidated Communications.

Dennis Roche became WEIU's interim general manager in 2005 and assumed the role in a full-time capacity at the start of 2006. Under Roche, the station completed its conversion to digital television by building a new transmission facility off-campus near Humboldt, and beginning digital broadcasting on channel 50 on April 4, 2006. The new digital facility had a larger coverage area and enabled multicasting to begin, with MHz Worldview added as a subchannel. Roche also initiated a membership campaign for WEIU-TV, one of the few PBS stations with no member program.

=== Disaffiliation from PBS and discontinuation ===
External videos
- WEIU's final sign off and shutdown of the station's transmitters, via YouTube

By 2024, the station was still heavily reliant on support from the Corporation for Public Broadcasting (CPB) and Eastern Illinois University. That fiscal year, WEIU-TV reported revenue of $1.41 million, of which $471,980—33 percent—came from the CPB and $456,119—32 percent—came from the university, none of which was an appropriation made by EIU. The station had 82 members who contributed $4,243 and 359 members of a friends group who donated $85,659. As a result, Congress's 2025 action to rescind funding for the CPB in the Rescissions Act of 2025 put the station in financial jeopardy. On September 30, 2025, WEIU-TV concluded its affiliation with PBS and found other program sources to replace the 25 percent of its programming that was supplied by the network. The aim of the university was to keep News Watch and related programming in service as part of its academic programs. After the disaffiliation, EIU laid off five WEIU-TV employees, including the programming director.

On April 26, 2026, WEIU-TV announced that it was ending its operations as a broadcast television station on May 15, with News Watch continuing as a daily live stream on YouTube during the fall and spring semesters. WEIU radio was unaffected by the changes. The station left the air for the last time at 10 a.m. CDT.

== Technical information and subchannels ==
WEIU-TV's transmitter was located near Humboldt, Illinois. The station's signal was multiplexed:

Subchannels of WEIU-TV
Channel	Res.	Short name	Programming
51.1	1080i	WEIU-HD	Educational Independent
51.2	480i	FNX	FNX
51.6	480i	HitMix	Simulcast of WEIU

=== Analog-to-digital conversion ===
WEIU-TV shut down its analog signal, over UHF channel 51, on February 17, 2009, the original target digital television transition date. The station's digital signal remained on its pre-transition UHF channel 50, using virtual channel 51.

WEIU-TV relocated its signal from channel 50 to channel 30 in 2019, as a result of the 2016 United States wireless spectrum auction.
