= WSIU-TV =

Television station in Carbondale, Illinois

WSIU-TV and WUSI-TV

WSIU-TV: Carbondale, Illinois; WUSI-TV: Olney, Illinois; United States
- Channels for WSIU-TV: Digital: 8 (VHF); Virtual: 8
- Channels for WUSI-TV: Digital: 23 (UHF); Virtual: 16
- Branding: PBS WSIU

Programming
- Affiliations: 8.1/16.1: PBS; for others, see § Subchannels

Ownership
- Owner: Southern Illinois University; (Board of Trustees of Southern Illinois University)
- Sister stations: TV: WSEC/WMEC/WQEC; Radio: WSIU/WUSI/WVSI

History
- First air date: WSIU-TV: November 6, 1961; WUSI-TV: August 19, 1968
- Former call signs: WSIU-TV: WSIU (CP, 1959–1960)
- Former channel number: WSIU-TV: Analog: 8 (VHF, 1961–2009); Digital: 40 (UHF, until 2009); WUSI-TV: Analog: 16 (UHF, 1968–2009); Digital: 19 (UHF, until 2020)
- Former affiliations: WSIU-TV: NET (1961–1970); WUSI-TV: NET (1968–1970)
- Call sign meaning: WSIU-TV: Southern Illinois University; WUSI-TV: anagram of WSIU

Technical information
- Licensing authority: FCC
- Facility ID: WSIU-TV: 4297; WUSI-TV: 4301
- ERP: WSIU-TV: 53 kW; WUSI-TV: 46 kW
- HAAT: WSIU-TV: 271.3 m (890 ft); WUSI-TV: 283.8 m (931 ft)
- Transmitter coordinates: WSIU-TV: 38°6′11″N 89°14′40″W; WUSI-TV: 38°50′19″N 88°7′47″W
- Translator: 28 (DRT) Cape Girardeau, MO

Links
- Public license information: WSIU-TV: Public file; LMS; WUSI-TV: Public file; LMS
- Website: www.wsiu.org

WSIU-TV (channel 8) is a PBS member television station in Carbondale, Illinois, United States. It is owned by Southern Illinois University (SIU) alongside NPR member WSIU (91.9 FM). The two stations share studios at the Communications Building on the university's campus on Lincoln Drive in Carbondale; WSIU-TV's transmitter is located along US 51 near Tamaroa, Illinois.

WSIU also operates full-time simulcast WUSI-TV (channel 16) in Olney, Illinois; from a transmitter on North Shipley Road (County Road 900 E) near Dundas, WUSI-TV serves the southeastern part of the state, including Olney and Effingham, and also covers Vincennes, Indiana. A digital replacement translator of WSIU-TV is located in Cape Girardeau, Missouri, on UHF channel 28. SIU also owns WSEC, based in Springfield, which leads a three-station network serving viewers in Springfield, Macomb, and Quincy.

== History ==
SIU had been interested in educational television since 1950, but the educational television channel assigned to Carbondale—UHF channel 61—was deemed unsuitable as unable to cover a wide area. In 1958, the Federal Communications Commission (FCC) assigned VHF channel 8 in its stead, and the university announced it would file to use it. The FCC granted the WSIU construction permit on November 18, 1959, and add the -TV suffix to its call sign on January 1, 1960. Over the course of 1961, construction on the transmitter experienced a series of setbacks, but the station began broadcasting educational programs to 70 area schools on November 6, 1961.

In 1966, SIU obtained a construction permit to build a UHF station in Olney to rebroadcast WSIU-TV and expand its coverage area. WUSI-TV signed on August 19, 1968. From 1980 to 1982, the Olney station produced limited opt-out programming from the Carbondale station after receiving a $420,000 grant for equipment; however, budget cuts at SIU and the Corporation for Public Broadcasting led to these programs being dropped.

== Programming ==
During Southern Illinois University's academic year, WSIU-TV broadcast a live student-produced newscast, River Region Evening Edition, which airs Monday through Thursday (on days when classes are held) at 5 p.m., with repeats of WSIU InFocus shown on Friday at 5 p.m. Three other student-produced programs also air on WSIU/WUSI, alt.news 26:46, Studio A, and Scholastic Hi-Q. Both alt.news 26:46 and Studio A occasionally air on the station on Sundays at 10 p.m. with Scholastic Hi-Q airing each Sunday at 5 p.m. Since WUSI-TV operates as a full-time satellite of WSIU-TV, it simulcasts the programs produced from WSIU-TV, with no local insertion.

== Technical information ==
=== Subchannels ===
The stations' signals are multiplexed:

Subchannels of WSIU-TV and WUSI-TV
Channel		Res.	Short name		Programming
WSIU-TV	WUSI-TV	Res.	WSIU-TV	WUSI-TV	Programming
8.1	16.1	720p	WSIU	WUSI HD	PBS
8.2	16.2	480i	WORLD		World
8.3	16.3	480i	CREATE		Create
8.4	16.4	480i	KIDS247		PBS Kids
8.5	16.5	480i	WSIU FM		Audio simulcast of WSIU with DTV reception information

=== Translator ===
Location	Call sign	Channel	ERP	HAAT	Facility ID	Transmitter coordinates
Cape Girardeau, MO	WSIU-TV (DRT)	28	5 kW	202 m (663 ft)	4297	37°24′23″N 89°33′44″W

=== Analog-to-digital conversion ===
WSIU-TV shut down its analog signal, over VHF channel 8, at 9 p.m. on January 29, 2009. The station's digital signal relocated from its pre-transition UHF channel 40 to VHF channel 8 for post-transition operations.

WUSI-TV shut down its analog signal, over UHF channel 16, at 9 p.m. on February 17, 2009, the original target date on which full-power television stations in the United States were to transition from analog to digital broadcasts under federal mandate (which was later pushed back to June 12, 2009). The station's digital signal remained on its pre-transition UHF channel 19, using virtual channel 16.
