= 2012 Morgan State Bears football team =

American college football season

2012 Morgan State Bears football
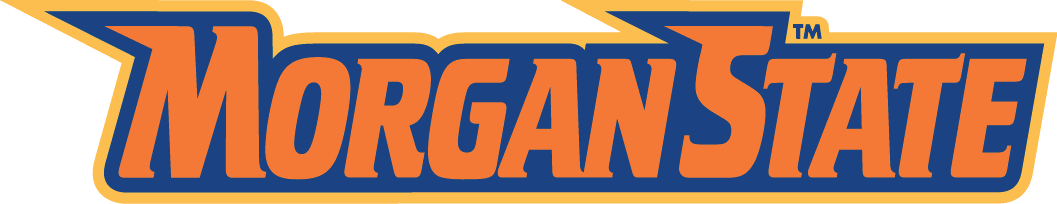
- Conference: Mid-Eastern Athletic Conference
- Record: 3–8 (2–6 MEAC)
- Head coach: Donald Hill-Eley (12th season)
- Offensive coordinator: William "B.T." Sherman/Joseph Wright
- Defensive coordinator: Alonzo Lee/Herbert Parham
- Home stadium: Hughes Stadium

2012 Mid-Eastern Athletic Conference football standings
	Conf.			Overall
Team	W		L	W		L
No. 22 Bethune–Cookman $^	8	–	0	9	–	3
Howard	6	–	2	7	–	4
North Carolina A&T	5	–	3	7	–	4
North Carolina Central	5	–	3	6	–	5
Delaware State	5	–	3	6	–	5
South Carolina State	4	–	4	5	–	6
Florida A&M	4	–	4	4	–	7
Hampton	3	–	5	3	–	7
Norfolk State	2	–	6	4	–	7
Morgan State	2	–	6	3	–	8
Savannah State	0	–	8	1	–	10
$ – Conference champion; ^ – FCS playoff participant; Rankings from The Sports Network poll

The 2012 Morgan State Bears football team represented Morgan State University in the 2012 NCAA Division I FCS football season. They were led by 12th-year head coach Donald Hill-Eley and played their home games at Hughes Stadium. They are a member of the Mid-Eastern Athletic Conference (MEAC). Morgan State finished the season 3–8, 2–6 in MEAC play to finish in a tie for ninth place.

== Schedule ==
Date	Time	Opponent	Site	TV	Result	Attendance
September 1	1:00 pm	Sacred Heart*	Hughes Stadium; Baltimore, MD		W 30–27 ^{4OT}	3,651
September 8	6:00 pm	at Buffalo*	University at Buffalo Stadium; Amherst, NY		L 34–56	15,570
September 15	3:30 pm	at Akron*	InfoCision Stadium; Akron, OH	ESPN3	L 6–66	9,933
September 27	7:30 pm	at North Carolina A&T	Aggie Stadium; Greensboro, NC	ESPNU	W 21–18	14,015
October 6	7:00 pm	at Savannah State	Ted Wright Stadium; Savannah, GA		W 45–6	1,978
October 13	1:00 pm	North Carolina Central	Hughes Stadium; Baltimore, MD		L 20–24	10,324
October 20	1:00 pm	at Howard	William H. Greene Stadium; Washington, D.C. (Rivalry)		L 20–21	10,305
October 25	7:30 pm	Delaware State	Hughes Stadium; Baltimore, MD	ESPNU	L 23–28	3,012
November 3	1:00 pm	Bethune-Cookman	Hughes Stadium; Baltimore, MD		L 13–24	2,187
November 10	1:00 pm	at Norfolk State	William "Dick" Price Stadium; Norfolk, VA		L 0–30	6,428
November 17	1:00 pm	Hampton	Hughes Stadium; Baltimore, MD		L 17–27	850
*Non-conference game; All times are in Eastern time

- Source: Schedule
