= 2012 Hampton Pirates football team =

American college football season

2012 Hampton Pirates football
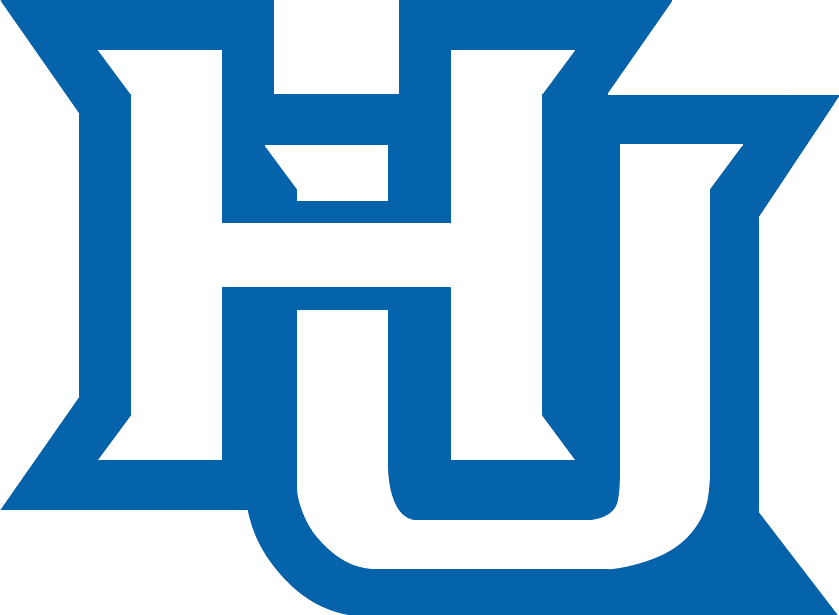
- Conference: Mid-Eastern Athletic Conference
- Record: 3–7 (3–5 MEAC)
- Head coach: Donovan Rose (4th season)
- Offensive coordinator: Earnest Wilson (1st season)
- Defensive coordinator: Keith Goganious
- Home stadium: Armstrong Stadium

2012 Mid-Eastern Athletic Conference football standings
	Conf.			Overall
Team	W		L	W		L
No. 22 Bethune–Cookman $^	8	–	0	9	–	3
Howard	6	–	2	7	–	4
North Carolina A&T	5	–	3	7	–	4
North Carolina Central	5	–	3	6	–	5
Delaware State	5	–	3	6	–	5
South Carolina State	4	–	4	5	–	6
Florida A&M	4	–	4	4	–	7
Hampton	3	–	5	3	–	7
Norfolk State	2	–	6	4	–	7
Morgan State	2	–	6	3	–	8
Savannah State	0	–	8	1	–	10
$ – Conference champion; ^ – FCS playoff participant; Rankings from The Sports Network poll

The 2012 Hampton Pirates football team represented Hampton University in the 2012 NCAA Division I FCS football season. They were led by fourth year head coach Donovan Rose and played their home games at Armstrong Stadium. They are a member of the Mid-Eastern Athletic Conference. They finished the season 3–7, 3–5 in MEAC play to finish the season in eighth place.

== Schedule ==
Date	Time	Opponent	Site	TV	Result	Attendance
August 30	8:00 pm	at Tennessee Tech*	Tucker Stadium; Cookeville, TN	OVCDN	L 31–41	10,130
September 8	6:00 pm	No. 7 Old Dominion*	Armstrong Stadium; Hampton, VA		L 7–45	5,500
September 15	6:00 pm	at Florida A&M	Bragg Memorial Stadium; Tallahassee, FL		L 20–44	17,871
September 29	6:00 pm	Bethune-Cookman	Armstrong Stadium; Hampton, VA		L 26–38	1,200
October 13	1:00 pm	Norfolk State	Armstrong Stadium; Hampton, VA (Battle of the Bay)		W 28–14	8,500
October 18	7:30 pm	at North Carolina Central	O'Kelly–Riddick Stadium; Durham, NC	ESPNU	L 20–37	9,648
October 27	2:00 pm	Savannah State^{†}	Armstrong Stadium; Hampton, VA		W 21–13	5,500
November 3	1:00 pm	at Howard	William H. Greene Stadium; Washington, DC (The Real HU)		L 10–20	3,086
November 10	1:00 pm	at Delaware State	Alumni Stadium; Dover, DE		L 27–35	2,249
November 17	1:00 pm	at Morgan State	Hughes Stadium; Baltimore, MD		W 27–17	850
*Non-conference game; ^{†}Homecoming; Rankings from The Sports Network Poll released prior to the game; All times are in Eastern time
