= 2012 Savannah State Tigers football team =

American college football season

2012 Savannah State Tigers football
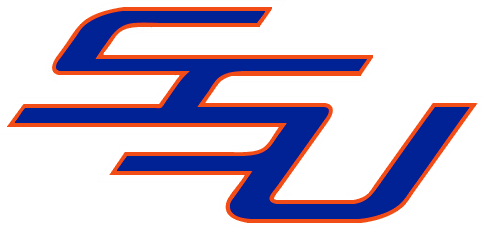
- Conference: Mid-Eastern Athletic Conference
- Record: 1–10 (0–8 MEAC)
- Head coach: Steve Davenport (2nd season)
- Offensive coordinator: Terance Mathis (2nd season)
- Home stadium: Ted A. Wright Stadium

2012 Mid-Eastern Athletic Conference football standings
	Conf.			Overall
Team	W		L	W		L
No. 22 Bethune–Cookman $^	8	–	0	9	–	3
Howard	6	–	2	7	–	4
North Carolina A&T	5	–	3	7	–	4
North Carolina Central	5	–	3	6	–	5
Delaware State	5	–	3	6	–	5
South Carolina State	4	–	4	5	–	6
Florida A&M	4	–	4	4	–	7
Hampton	3	–	5	3	–	7
Norfolk State	2	–	6	4	–	7
Morgan State	2	–	6	3	–	8
Savannah State	0	–	8	1	–	10
$ – Conference champion; ^ – FCS playoff participant; Rankings from The Sports Network poll

The 2012 Savannah State Tigers football team represented Savannah State University in the 2012 NCAA Division I FCS football season. The Tigers were members of the Mid-Eastern Athletic Conference (MEAC). This was the second season under the guidance of head coach Steve Davenport. The Tigers played their home games at Ted Wright Stadium and they finished the 2012 season with a 1–10 record (0–8 in the MEAC) to finish last in the conference.

== Coaches and support staff ==
Name	Type	College	Graduating year
Steve Davenport	Head coach	Georgia Tech	1990
Greg Lester	Assistant head coach/Outside Receivers coach	Georgia Tech	
Terance Mathis	Offensive coordinator/Inside Receivers coach	New Mexico	1990
Thomas Balkcom	Defensive backs coach	Georgia Tech	
William Bell	Running backs coach	Georgia Tech	
Mitch Doolittle	Linebackers coach	Presbyterian College	2006
Saeed Khalif	Defensive coordinator/defensive line coach	Georgia Tech	1988
Tony Haynes	Quarterbacks coach	Webber International	2005
Broderick Jones	Offensive line coach	Ole Miss	2005

== Media ==
Radio flagship: WHCJ
Broadcasters: Toby Hyde (play-by-play), Curtis Foster (analyst)

== Schedule ==
Date	Time	Opponent	Site	TV	Result	Attendance
September 1	7:00 pm	at No. 19 Oklahoma State*	Boone Pickens Stadium; Stillwater, OK	FCS	L 0–84	55,784
September 8	6:00 pm	at No. 6 Florida State*	Doak Campbell Stadium; Tallahassee, FL	ESPN3	L 0–55	71,126
September 22	7:00 pm	North Carolina Central	Ted Wright Stadium; Savannah, GA		L 33–45	3,415
September 29	1:00 pm	at Howard	William H. Greene Stadium; Washington, D.C.		L 9–56	2,955
October 6	7:00 pm	Morgan State	Ted Wright Stadium; Savannah, GA		L 6–45	1,978
October 13	6:00 pm	at Florida A&M	Bragg Memorial Stadium; Tallahassee, FL		L 3–44	12,561
October 20	2:00 pm	Edward Waters*^{†}	Ted Wright Stadium; Savannah, GA		W 42–35	4,269
October 27	2:00 pm	at Hampton	Armstrong Stadium; Hampton, VA		L 13–21	5,500
November 3	2:00 pm	at Norfolk State	William "Dick" Price Stadium; Norfolk, VA		L 21–33	16,269
November 10	5:00 pm	Bethune-Cookman	Ted Wright Stadium; Savannah, GA		L 7–49	3,683
November 17	1:00 pm	at South Carolina State	Oliver C. Dawson Stadium; Orangeburg, SC		L 13–27	10,011
*Non-conference game; ^{†}Homecoming; Rankings from AP Poll released prior to the game; All times are in Eastern time

== Game summaries ==
=== Oklahoma State ===
Quarter	1	2	3	4	Total
Savannah State	0	0	0	0	0
Oklahoma State	35	14	21	14	84

at Boone Pickens Stadium, Stillwater, Oklahoma

- Game time: 7 pm EST
- Game weather: Sunny, 21% humidity
- Game attendance: 55,784
- Referee: David Alvarez
- TV: Fox College Sports

=== Florida State ===
Quarter	1	2	3	4	Total
Savannah State	0	0	0	0	0
Florida State	35	13	7	0	55

at Doak Campbell Stadium, Tallahassee, Florida

- Game time: 6:00 pm EST
- Game weather: Rain, lightning delay, game was terminated
- Game attendance: 71,126
- Referee: Walter Davenpor
- TV: ESPN3

For their second game of the season, the Tigers traveled to Tallahassee, Florida to face the #6 ranked Seminoles of Florida State. This was the first meeting between these teams. Prior to the game, the Seminoles were installed as 70 1/2 point favorites, reportedly making Savannah State the biggest underdogs in any college football game ever.

The Seminoles held the Tigers scoreless, winning 55–0. Florida State scored 35 points in the first quarter, with a 61-yd touchdown pass from EJ Manuel to Rodney Smith, a 6-yard touchdown run from Chris Thompson, an 8-yd touchdown pass from E.J. Manuel to Greg Dent, a 9-yd touchdown pass from E.J. Manuel to Kelvin Benjamin, and a 5-yd touchdown run from Devonta Freeman. Florida State added another thirteen points in the second quarter as the result of a 19-yard touchdown run from James Wilder, Jr. and another 1-yd touchdown run from James Wilder, Jr. with a subsequent failed point-after-attempt from kicker Dustin Hopkins, ending his streak of 145 consecutive extra point attempts. Florida State scored another seven points in the third quarter as the result of a 19-yd touchdown pass from Jacob Coker to Kelvin Benjamin.

The Seminoles totaled 413 yards of offense in the game, with 167 rushing yards and 246 passing yards while holding Savannah State to just 28 total yards of offense. The victory improved Florida State's all-time record against the Tigers to 1-0.

The game was delayed by lightning in the area in the second quarter and later called with 8:59 left in the third quarter, again due to weather.

=== North Carolina Central ===
Quarter	1	2	3	4	Total
North Carolina Central	3	7	28	7	45
Savannah State	7	7	6	13	33

at Ted Wright Stadium, Savannah, Georgia

- Game time: 7 p.m.
- Game weather: Clear
- Game attendance: 3,415
- Referee: Darrell Davis

=== Howard ===
Quarter	1	2	3	4	Total
Savannah State	0	3	6	0	9
Howard	7	21	28	0	56

at William H. Greene Stadium, Washington, D.C.

- Game time: 1 p.m.
- Game weather: Partly Sunny
- Game attendance: 2,955
- Referee: Donnell Leathers

=== Morgan State ===
Quarter	1	2	3	4	Total
Morgan State	7	7	24	7	45
Savannah State	6	0	0	0	6

at Ted Wright Stadium, Savannah, Georgia

- Game time: 7 p.m.
- Game weather: Partly Sunny
- Game attendance: 1,978
- Referee: Kelvin Thorpe

=== Florida A&M ===
Quarter	1	2	3	4	Total
Savannah State	3	0	0	0	3
Florida A&M	13	10	14	7	44

at Bragg Memorial Stadium, Tallahassee, Florida

- Game time: 6 p.m.
- Referee: Flemon Williams

=== Edward Waters ===
Quarter	1	2	3	4	Total
Edward Waters	14	7	7	7	35
Savannah State	14	14	7	7	42

at Ted Wright Stadium, Savannah, Georgia

- Game time: 2 p.m.
- Game weather: Sunny
- Game attendance: 4,269
- Referee: Andre Lowe

Antonio Bostick threw for four touchdowns and ran for two as the Tigers defeated NAIA Edward Waters College for the first win of the season. Bostick finished the game with 319 yards passing.

=== Hampton ===
Quarter	1	2	3	4	Total
Savannah State	3	0	7	3	13
Hampton	0	14	7	0	21

at Armstrong Stadium, Hampton, Virginia

- Game time: 2 p.m.
- Game weather: Cloudy, Windy & Rain
- Game attendance: 5,500
- Referee: Clement Hall

=== Norfolk State ===
Quarter	1	2	3	4	Total
Savannah State	0	21	0	0	21
Norfolk State	17	7	6	3	33

at Price Stadium, Norfolk, Virginia

- Game time: 2 p.m.
- Game weather: Partly sunny
- Game attendance: 16,269
- Referee: D. Leathers

=== Bethune-Cookman ===
Quarter	1	2	3	4	Total
Bethune-Cookman	7	28	7	7	49
Savannah State	0	0	7	0	7

at Ted Wright Stadium, Savannah, Georgia

- Game time: 5 p.m.
- Game weather: Sunny, Fair
- Game attendance: 3,683
- Referee: Steve Kinny

=== South Carolina State ===
Quarter	1	2	3	4	Total
Savannah State	7	0	6	0	13
South Carolina State	10	3	7	7	27

at Dawson Stadium, Orangeburg, South Carolina

- Game time: 1 pm
- Game weather: Cold and Windy
- Game attendance: 10,011
- Referee: Andre Lowe

South Carolina State defeated the Tigers 27-13 in the season finale for both teams. The Bulldogs led 13-7 at halftime and pushed the lead to 20-7 with 6:21 left in the third quarter. The Tigers scored on a 10-yard pass from Victorian Hardison to Dylan Cook with 1:39 left in the third to pull the Tigers within a score, 20-13, but missed the extra point. The Bulldogs blocked an SSU punt which put them in scoring position from the Tigers 20-yard line to seal the victory for the bulldogs. The Tigers defense was led by Wayne Burden who had 11 tackles (10 solo) and 3 tackles for loss.
