= Joe Taylor (American football coach) =

American football coach and college athletics administrator

Current position
- Title: Athletic director
- Team: Virginia Union
- Conference: CIAA

Biographical details
- Born: May 7, 1950 (age 76); Washington, D.C., U.S.
- Education: Western Illinois (1972)

Coaching career (HC unless noted)
- 1972–1977: H. D. Woodson HS (DC) (assistant)
- 1978–1979: Eastern Illinois (OL)
- 1980–1981: Virginia Union (OC)
- 1982: Howard (DC)
- 1983: Howard
- 1984–1991: Virginia Union
- 1992–2007: Hampton
- 2008–2012: Florida A&M

Administrative career (AD unless noted)
- 2013–present: Virginia Union

Head coaching record
- Overall: 232–96–4
- Bowls: 1–0
- Tournaments: 1–5 (NCAA D-II playoffs); 0–5 (NCAA D-I-AA playoffs)

Accomplishments and honors

Championships
- 5 Black college national (1994, 1997, 2004–2006); 4 CIAA (1986, 1992–1994); 6 MEAC (1997–1998, 2004–2006, 2010); 2 CIAA Northern Division (1986, 1990)

Awards
- 4× MEAC Coach of the Year (1997, 2004–2006)
- College Football Hall of Fame; Inducted in 2019 (profile)

Joe Taylor (born May 7, 1950) is an American college athletics administrator and former football coach. He is the athletic director at Virginia Union University in Richmond, Virginia, a position he has held since 2013. Taylor served as the head football coach at Howard University in 1983, Virginia Union from 1984 to 1991, Hampton University from 1992 to 2007, and Florida A&M University from 2008 to 2012, compiling a career college football coaching record of 232–96–4. Taylor led the Hampton Pirates to five black college football national championships (1994, 1997, 2004, 2005, and 2006) and eight conference titles. He was inducted into the College Football Hall of Fame in 2019.

== Early years ==
Taylor is a native of Washington, D.C. He graduated from Western Illinois University in 1972 and began his coaching career at H. D. Woodson High School in Washington, D.C. He served as a physical education teacher, head wrestling coach, and assistant football and baseball coach in the District of Columbia schools.

In 1978, Taylor was hired as the offensive line coach at Eastern Illinois University in Charleston, Illinois. He helped lead Eastern Illinois to the 1978 NCAA Division II Football Championship.

In 1980, Taylor was hired as the offensive coordinator at Virginia Union University, a historically black university (HBCU) located in Richmond, Virginia. After two years at Virginia Union, Taylor became the defensive coordinator at Howard University, an HBCU in Washington, D.C. He was named the head football coach at Howard in 1983. He had a 1–9 record in his only season as head coach at Howard.

== Virginia Union ==
In 1984, Taylor was hired by Virginia Union as its head football coach. In 1986, Taylor led Virginia Union to an undefeated regular season, a Central Intercollegiate Athletic Association championship and a berth in the NCAA Division II playoffs. His teams also made the Division II playoffs in 1990 and 1991. The 1990 team went undefeated as well. In eight years as the head coach at Virginia Union, Taylor compiled a record of 60–19–3 for a .750 winning percentage.

== Hampton ==
From 1992 to 2007, Taylor was the head football coach at Hampton University, an HBCU located in Hampton, Virginia. In his first three years at Hampton, the school played in NCAA Division II and the Central Intercollegiate Athletic Association (CIAA). In 1993, Taylor's team was undefeated in the regular season, advanced to the quarterfinal round of the national playoffs, and became the first CIAA team in history to win 12 games in a season. In 1994, Hampton broke the CIAA total offense record with 5,575 yards and became the first CIAA team to average more than 500 yards of total offense per game. By the end of the 1994 season, Hampton had won 23 straight games against CIAA opponents. In recognition of his achievement, Taylor selected as College Coach of the Year in Virginia for 1994 by the Portsmouth Sports Club.

In 1995, Hampton moved up to NCAA Division I-AA (now known as Division I FCS) play and joined the Mid-Eastern Athletic Conference (MEAC) in 1996. Taylor continued to win at the Division I-AA level and became "the most successful football coach in Hampton history." Taylor's Hampton teams won five black college national championships (1994, 1997, 2004, 2005, and 2006), eight conference titles (three in the CIAA and five in the MEAC), the 1999 Heritage Bowl, and seven trips to the NCAA playoffs. He was also named MEAC Coach of the Year for three straight years from 2004 to 2006.

The seniors on Taylor's 2006 team won three consecutive black college national championships. Taylor called the 2006 squad the best in Hampton history. He said, "Start by looking at what they've accomplished as a group. The seniors are 22–2 in the conference the past three seasons. They are 31–4 overall during that time and 38–8 for the four years. Because of their record, they went onto the field with a bull's-eye on our back every game this year. The kids survived that onslaught and got better, while dealing with a higher number of injuries than ever before."

In 2004, a New Jersey newspaper published a feature story on Taylor. Hampton athletic director Dennis Thomas asserted that Taylor had earned his chance to coach a major Division I-A program, but noted that he wouldn't be able to name a black coach out of a black university getting a chance to be a big-time college football coach, "It's never happened. What's that telling you?" Taylor insisted that the lack of offers did not eat at him or leave him bitter. He noted:

"I've always seen coaching more about being a ministry than about X's and O's. I want to make a difference, and I think I do that where I'm coaching now. You won't hear me bellyache. You can do anything in this world if you believe in it and map it out. If one man can do it, that means another man can do it too. Do what Sylvester Croom has done. Do what Tyrone Willingham has done. There's a road map out there, I tell the young coaches now. Follow what they did."

In 16 years as the head coach at Hampton, he compiled a record of 136 wins, 49 losses and one tie for a .734 winning percentage. Taylor's tenure produced a good number of great Hampton Pirate players who went on to the National Football League and Canadian Football League. The list include: Kendall Langford, Justin Durant, Nevin McCaskill, Alonzo Coleman, Zuriel Smith, Jerome Mathis, Marquay McDaniel, Onrea Jones, Travarous Bain, Darian Barnes, Cordell Taylor and Isaac Hilton. These players were All-MEAC selections, as well as Black College Football All-Americans, and Div I-AA All-Americans during their college careers.

== Florida A&M ==
In December 2007, Taylor announced that he would leave Hampton to coach at Florida A&M University (FAMU), an HBCU in Tallahassee, Florida. Taylor's contract with FAMU was reported to be for five years with a base salary of $225,000 and a $12,000 housing allowance. FAMU plays in the NCAA Division I Football Championship. When Taylor took over, the FAMU football team was coming off a 3–8 season, had gone 29–35 since 2001, and was "reeling after the loss of 14 scholarships in four years." In his first two seasons at FAMU, Taylor turned the program into a winner, compiling records of 9–3 in 2008 and 8–3 in 2009. In November 2009, FAMU athletic director Bill Hayes praised Taylor's contributions, "He has recruited better, and he has inspired and organized the program in such a way that he has been able to maximize the talent here. Joe had such a solid plan and approach to building winners until the players just bought in. They bought into what he was trying to do, and it didn't take him long."

On Saturday, November 3, 2012, he announced his retirement at the end of the season to his players during their pre-game breakfast prior to that day's game against North Carolina Central. The Rattlers lost that game, falling to 3–6 and ensuring the first losing season in Taylor's tenure at Florida A&M. Just four days later, Taylor announced he was resigning effective immediately.

== Personal life ==
Taylor is married to the former Beverly Richardson. They have two adult sons, Aaron Taylor and Dennis Taylor. Member of the Noble Klan of Men, Kappa Alpha Psi fraternity, Zeta Mu chapter.

== Head coaching record ==
Year	Team	Overall	Conference	Standing	Bowl/playoffs	NCAA DII^{#}	TSN^{°}
Howard Bison (Mid-Eastern Athletic Conference) (1983)
1983	Howard	1–9	1–3	T–3rd			
Howard:		1–9	1–3				
Virginia Union Panthers (Central Intercollegiate Athletic Association) (1984–1991)
1984	Virginia Union	5–2–2	4–2–1	2nd (Northern)			
1985	Virginia Union	6–4	4–3	T–3rd (Northern)			
1986	Virginia Union	11–1	7–0	1st (Northern)	L NCAA Division II First Round	5	
1987	Virginia Union	7–3	4–3	3rd (Northern)			
1988	Virginia Union	7–2	4–2	2nd (Northern)			
1989	Virginia Union	6–2–1	4–1–1	T–2nd (Northern)			
1990	Virginia Union	10–2	7–0	1st (Northern)	L NCAA Division II First Round	5	
1991	Virginia Union	8–3	5–1	4th	L NCAA Division II First Round	10	
Virginia Union:		60–19–3	39–12–2				
Hampton Pirates (Central Intercollegiate Athletic Association) (1992–1994)
1992	Hampton	9–2–1	5–0–1	1st	L NCAA Division II First Round	6	
1993	Hampton	12–1	8–0	1st	L NCAA Division II Quarterfinal	3	
1994	Hampton	10–1	8–0	1st			
Hampton Pirates (Mid-Eastern Athletic Conference) (1995–2007)
1995	Hampton	8–3	3–1	NA			
1996	Hampton	5–6	3–4	5th			
1997	Hampton	10–2	7–0	1st	L NCAA Division I-AA First Round		9
1998	Hampton	9–3	7–1	T–1st	L NCAA Division I-AA First Round		11
1999	Hampton	8–4	5–3	3rd	W Heritage		
2000	Hampton	7–4	5–3	T–4th			
2001	Hampton	7–4	6–2	2nd			
2002	Hampton	7–5	5–3	T–2nd			
2003	Hampton	7–4	5–2	T–2nd			
2004	Hampton	10–2	6–1	T–1st	L NCAA Division I-AA First Round		12
2005	Hampton	11–1	8–0	1st	L NCAA Division I-AA First Round		10
2006	Hampton	10–2	7–1	1st	L NCAA Division I First Round		11
2007	Hampton	6–5	5–3	4th			
Hampton:		136–49–1	93–24–1				
Florida A&M Rattlers (Mid-Eastern Athletic Conference) (2008–2012)
2008	Florida A&M	9–3	5–3	T–2nd			
2009	Florida A&M	8–3	6–2	2nd			23
2010	Florida A&M	8–3	7–1	T–1st			
2011	Florida A&M	7–4	5–3	T–4th			
2012	Florida A&M	3–6 (Note: Taylor retired after the first nine games of the 2012 season. Earl Holmes served as interim head coach for the final two games of the season. Florida A&M finished the year 4–7 overall and 4–4 in Mid-Eastern Athletic Conference play, tying for sixth place.)	3–3				
Florida A&M:		35–19	26–12				
Total:		232–96–4					
National championship Conference title Conference division title or championship game berth

== See also ==
- List of college football career coaching wins leaders
