= 2012 VMI Keydets football team =

American college football season

2012 VMI Keydets football
- Conference: Big South Conference
- Record: 2–9 (1–5 Big South)
- Head coach: Sparky Woods (5th season)
- Offensive coordinator: Matt Campbell (3rd season)
- Defensive coordinator: Jeff Farrington (1st season)
- Home stadium: Alumni Memorial Field

2012 Big South Conference football standings
	Conf.			Overall
Team	W		L	W		L
No. 10 Stony Brook +^	5	–	1	10	–	3
Coastal Carolina +^	5	–	1	8	–	5
Liberty +	5	–	1	6	–	5
Charleston Southern	3	–	3	5	–	6
Gardner–Webb	2	–	4	3	–	8
VMI	1	–	5	2	–	9
Presbyterian	0	–	6	2	–	9
$ – Conference champion; ^ – FCS playoff participant; Rankings from The Sports Network poll

The 2012 VMI Keydets football team represented the Virginia Military Institute in the 2012 NCAA Division I FCS football season. The Keydets competed in the Big South Conference under head coach Sparky Woods, who was in his 5th season with VMI. They finished the season 2–9, 1–5 in Big South play to finish in sixth place.

== Schedule ==
Date	Time	Opponent	Site	TV	Result	Attendance
September 1	2:00 pm	at Delaware State*	Alumni Stadium; Dover, DE		L 10–17	2,952
September 8	1:30 pm	Chowan*	Alumni Memorial Field; Lexington, VA		W 24–17	4,854
September 15	1:30 pm	Richmond*	Alumni Memorial Field; Lexington, VA		L 6–47	6,827
September 22	3:30 pm	at Navy*	Navy–Marine Corps Memorial Stadium; Annapolis, MD	CBSSN	L 3–41	35,671
October 6	1:30 pm	Presbyterian	Alumni Memorial Field; Lexington, VA		W 17–7	5,507
October 13	1:30 pm	at Charleston Southern	Buccaneer Field; North Charleston, SC		L 14–32	2,191
October 20	1:30 pm	Coastal Carolina	Alumni Memorial Field; Lexington, VA	ESPN3	L 7–34	7,281
October 27	1:30 pm	at Gardner–Webb	Spangler Stadium; Boiling Springs, NC		L 7–38	5,620
November 3	6:00 pm	at No. 9 Stony Brook	LaValle Stadium; Stony Brook, NY		L 7–45	4,421
November 10	1:30 pm	The Citadel*	Alumni Memorial Field; Lexington, VA (Military Classic of the South)		L 24–27	7,863
November 17	1:30 pm	Liberty	Alumni Memorial Field; Lexington, VA	ESPN3	L 14–33	5,202
*Non-conference game; Rankings from The Sports Network Poll released prior to the game

== Game summaries ==
=== Delaware State ===
Quarter	1	2	3	4	Total
VMI	0	0	7	3	10
Delaware State	0	10	0	7	17

at Alumni Stadium (Dover, DE)

- Game time: 2:00 PM
- Game weather: 88 degrees, winds northwest 10 MPH
- Game attendance: 2,952
- Referee: Darrell Davis

=== Chowan ===
Quarter	1	2	3	4	Total
Chowan	0	7	10	0	17
VMI	14	0	0	10	24

at Alumni Memorial Field (Lexington, VA)

- Game time: 1:30 PM
- Game weather: 79 degrees, winds 5-10 MPH
- Game attendance: 4,854
- Referee: Kelvin Thorpe

=== Richmond ===
Quarter	1	2	3	4	Total
Richmond	10	6	28	3	47
VMI	0	6	0	0	6

at Alumni Memorial Field (Lexington, VA)

- Game time: 1:30 PM
- Game weather: 73 degrees, winds 2-5 MPH
- Game attendance: 6,827
- Referee: Stuart Millins

=== Navy ===
Quarter	1	2	3	4	Total
VMI	3	0	0	0	3
Navy	3	10	7	21	41

at Navy–Marine Corps Memorial Stadium (Annapolis, MD)

- Game time: 3:30 PM
- Game weather: 82 degrees, winds southwest 10-20 MPH
- Game attendance: 35,671
- Referee: Tracy Jones
- TV: CBS Sports Network

=== Presbyterian ===
Quarter	1	2	3	4	Total
Presbyterian	0	0	0	7	7
VMI	3	7	7	0	17

at Alumni Memorial Field (Lexington, VA)

- Game time: 1:30 PM
- Game weather: 74 degrees, winds west 10 MPH
- Game attendance: 5,507
- Referee: W. Davenport

=== Charleston Southern ===
Quarter	1	2	3	4	Total
VMI	0	7	0	7	14
Charleston Southern	13	6	13	0	32

at Buccaneer Field (Charleston, SC)

- Game time: 1:30 PM
- Game weather: 71 degrees, winds west 15 MPH
- Game attendance: 2,191
- Referee: Jeff Heaser

=== Coastal Carolina ===
Quarter	1	2	3	4	Total
Coastal Carolina	14	7	7	6	34
VMI	0	0	0	7	7

at Alumni Memorial Field (Lexington, VA)

- Game time: 1:30 PM
- Game weather: 62 degrees, winds 5-10 MPH
- Game attendance: 7,281
- Referee: J. Magallanes
- TV: ESPN3

=== Gardner–Webb ===
Quarter	1	2	3	4	Total
VMI	0	7	0	0	7
Gardner–Webb	3	7	28	0	38

at Spangler Stadium (Boiling Springs, NC)

- Game time: 1:30 PM
- Game weather: 67 degrees, winds northeast 8 MPH
- Game attendance: 5,620
- Referee: Tim Zimorski

=== Stony Brook ===
Quarter	1	2	3	4	Total
VMI	0	0	7	0	7
Stony Brook	14	14	7	10	45

at LaValle Stadium (Stony Brook, NY)

- Game time: 6:00 PM
- Game weather: 53 degrees, winds northwest 21 MPH
- Game attendance: 4,421
- Referee: Ron Cherry

=== The Citadel ===
Quarter	1	2	3	4	Total
The Citadel	7	10	7	3	27
VMI	3	0	7	14	24

at Alumni Memorial Field (Lexington, VA)

- Game time: 1:30 PM
- Game weather: 67 degrees, winds southwest 2 MPH
- Game attendance: 7,863
- Referee: Jeff Flanagan

=== Liberty ===
Quarter	1	2	3	4	Total
Liberty	0	13	6	14	33
VMI	7	0	7	0	14

at Alumni Memorial Field (Lexington, VA)

- Game time: 1:30 PM
- Game weather: High 40s, winds 8-10 MPH
- Game attendance: 5,202
- Referee: W. Davenport
- TV: ESPN3
