= 2012 Stony Brook Seawolves football team =

American college football season

2012 Stony Brook Seawolves football

Big South co-champion

FCS Playoffs Second Round, L 10–16 vs. Montana State
- Conference: Big South Conference

Ranking
- Sports Network: No. 11
- FCS Coaches: No. 13
- Record: 10–3 (5–1 Big South)
- Head coach: Chuck Priore (7th season)
- Offensive coordinator: Jeff Behrman (7th season)
- Defensive coordinator: Rob Nevaiser
- Home stadium: Kenneth P. LaValle Stadium

2012 Big South Conference football standings
	Conf.			Overall
Team	W		L	W		L
No. 10 Stony Brook +^	5	–	1	10	–	3
Coastal Carolina +^	5	–	1	8	–	5
Liberty +	5	–	1	6	–	5
Charleston Southern	3	–	3	5	–	6
Gardner–Webb	2	–	4	3	–	8
VMI	1	–	5	2	–	9
Presbyterian	0	–	6	2	–	9
$ – Conference champion; ^ – FCS playoff participant; Rankings from The Sports Network poll

The 2012 Stony Brook Seawolves football team represented Stony Brook University in the 2012 NCAA Division I FCS football season as a member of the Big South Conference. The team was coached by Chuck Priore and played its home games at Kenneth P. LaValle Stadium in Stony Brook, New York. This was their final season as a member of the Big South as they will join the Colonial Athletic Association in 2013. They finished the season 10–3, 5–1 in Big South play to share the conference championship with Coastal Carolina and Liberty. They received an at-large bid into the FCS Playoffs, their second straight playoff appearance, where they defeated Villanova in the first round before falling in the second round to Montana State.

== Before the season ==
=== Losses ===
Injured QB Michael Coulter who started for half of the 2011 season, top running back Brock Jackolski, WR Matt Brevi who amounted to 31 receptions for 616 yards and seven touchdowns in the 2011 season, CB Donald Porter are among the graduates of the program. Jackolski was notable for playing a crucial role together with Miguel Maysonet in Stony Brook's powerful running offense, 16th in FCS history with 6,394 all-purpose yards

=== Recruitment ===
Among 2012 Recruits is Marcus Coker who previously played for FBS Big Ten team Iowa rushing for more than 2,000 yards and 18 touchdown in two seasons. He was second in the Big Ten in rushing and earned second-team all-conference honors. The program also added Adrian Coxson who previously played for FBS Maryland. A third recruit from the Big Ten Minnesota, Leston Simpson, is transferring for the upcoming 2012 season. A second incoming transfer from the University of Maryland, Avery Graham, was announced late April with two years of eligibility left A third incoming transfer, Graham Ball, was announced from New Mexico Military Institute, where he led the Western States Football League in points (88). He went 58 of 62 on extra points and made 10 field goals, earning second team All-WSFL honors.

College recruiting
Name	Hometown	School	Height	Weight	40^{‡}	Commit date
Graham Ball	Lynn Haven, FL	New Mexico Military Institute	N/A	N/A		
Graham Ball	Recruit ratings: No ratings found					
Leston Simpson	Springfield Gardens, NY	Campus Magnet High School/ Lackawanna College/ Minnesota	N/A	N/A		
Leston Simpson	Recruit ratings: No ratings found					
Dimetrius Bernard; DL	Jamaica, NY	Holy Cross/ Fresno City College	6 ft 4 in (1.93 m)	260 lb (120 kg)		
Dimetrius Bernard; DL	Recruit ratings: No ratings found					
Marcus Coker; RB	Beltsville, MD	DeMatha Catholic/ Iowa	6 ft 0 in (1.83 m)	230 lb (100 kg)		
Marcus Coker; RB	Recruit ratings: No ratings found					
Adrian Coxson; WR	Baltimore, MD	City College/ Maryland	6 ft 1 in (1.85 m)	205 lb (93 kg)		
Adrian Coxson; WR	Recruit ratings: No ratings found					
Pat D'Amato; QB/ATH	Wethersfield, CT	Xavier	6 ft 2 in (1.88 m)	200 lb (91 kg)		
Pat D'Amato; QB/ATH	Recruit ratings: No ratings found					
Connor Davis; TE/DE	Fallston, MD	Fallston	6 ft 8 in (2.03 m)	240 lb (110 kg)		
Connor Davis; TE/DE	Recruit ratings: No ratings found					
Angelo DeShields; WR	Baltimore, MD	Mount Saint Joseph	6 ft 0 in (1.83 m)	195 lb (88 kg)		
Angelo DeShields; WR	Recruit ratings: No ratings found					
Abiade "A.B" Granger; WR	Riviera Beach, FL	Suncoast	5 ft 10 in (1.78 m)	165 lb (75 kg)		
Abiade "A.B" Granger; WR	Recruit ratings: No ratings found					
Da'Rell Hatcher; RB	Amityville, NY	Amityville	5 ft 10 in (1.78 m)	200 lb (91 kg)		
Da'Rell Hatcher; RB	Recruit ratings: No ratings found					
Carlos Hernandez; QB	Moreno Valley, CA	Rancho Verde	6 ft 3 in (1.91 m)	200 lb (91 kg)		
Carlos Hernandez; QB	Recruit ratings: No ratings found					
Deshawn Lindsay; S	Fort Lauderdale, FL	Plantation	5 ft 11 in (1.80 m)	170 lb (77 kg)		
Deshawn Lindsay; S	Recruit ratings: No ratings found					
Chris Makulik; FB	Patchogue, NY	Patchogue-Medford	6 ft 2 in (1.88 m)	240 lb (110 kg)		
Chris Makulik; FB	Recruit ratings: No ratings found					
Greg Melendez	Brooklyn, NY	Canarsie/ Idaho State	6 ft 1 in (1.85 m)	210 lb (95 kg)		
Greg Melendez	Recruit ratings: No ratings found					
Aaron Thompson; DL	Deer Park, NY	Deer Park	6 ft 4 in (1.93 m)	240 lb (110 kg)		
Aaron Thompson; DL	Recruit ratings: No ratings found					
Nick Vitale; WR	Madison, CT	Daniel Hand	5 ft 9 in (1.75 m)	185 lb (84 kg)		
Nick Vitale; WR	Recruit ratings: No ratings found					
Jaheem Woods; CB	Neptune Township, New Jersey	Neptune	6 ft 0 in (1.83 m)	180 lb (82 kg)		
Jaheem Woods; CB	Recruit ratings: No ratings found					
Overall recruit ranking:
Note: In many cases, Scout, Rivals, 247Sports, On3, and ESPN may conflict in their listings of height and weight.; In these cases, the average was taken. ESPN grades are on a 100-point scale.; Sources: "2012 Team Ranking". Rivals.com.

Note: This list is incomplete

=== Spring ===
Stony Brook scheduled the annual spring game for April 22 concluding the spring training period. The Defensive team defeated the Offense, 39-13, in a modified scoring game.

=== Honors ===
In early May Kyle Essington, Miguel Maysonet, and Marcus Coker were announced to be in the CFPA preseason watch list. In late June, 2012 Beyond College Sports Madness selected Miguel Maysonet, Jaware Dudley, and Kyle Essington were selected to Preseason All-America teams. In July, Maysonet was announced to be part of the 20 members Walter Payton Award watch list. The award is presented to the top offensive player in Football Championship Subdivision. Miguel Maysonet was announced to be the Big South 2012 preseason offensive player of the year, while another six players made it to the All-Conference preseason team.

=== Rankings and polls ===
Stony Brook was ranked 24th in Lindy's College Football Preview Magazine FCS Preseason Poll released in mid-July, the only team from the Big South in the poll. College Sporting News ranked Stony Brook as top 16 in the nation in their preseason poll. The Seawolves were ranked nine among FCS teams by the "Phil Steele's College Football Review" magazine. College Sports Madness ranked the Seawolves 22nd in their preseason preview. Stony Brook was positioned 11th in the College Sports Journal Preseason Top-25 Poll.

Stony Brook was selected as the favorite in the Big South's preseason poll, as voted by the league's head coaches and media panel. The Seawolves amounted to fifteen of eighteen first-place votes with 123 total points. Stony Brook was ranked as the top 17 team in the FCS Coaches Poll

== Roster ==
2012 Stony Brook Seawolves Roster
**Quarterbacks (QB)**: 17 Ryan Andersen, So; 11 Pat D'Amato, Fr; 15 Kyle Essington, Sr; 13 Craig Geoghan, Jr; 14 Carlos Hernandez, Fr; 12 Lyle Negron, Jr; 16 Victor Spinelli, Jr; **Running backs (RB)**: 31 Peace Edafe, Jr; 5 Miguel Maysonet, Sr; 27 Kedar Hunter, Rs Fr; 32 Davon Lawrence, So; 34 Marcus Coker, Jr; 19 Jamie Williams, Rs Fr; **Fullbacks (FB)**: 11 Chris Fenelon, Sr; 10 Matt Faiella, Jr; 40 Chris Makulik, Fr; 43 Anthony Stanish, Fr; **Wide receivers (WR)**: 7 Myles Campbell, Jr; 1 Adrian Coxson, So; 86 Angelo DeShields, Fr; 89 Kevin Famulari, Sr; 25 Jordan Gush, Sr; 80 Steve Marino, Fr; 81 Chris McMillan, Jr; 18 Major Mobley, Jr; 3 Kevin Norrell, Sr; 87 Nick Vitale, Fr; 83 Nick Wagner, Fr; 29 Devante Wheeler, Fr	**Tight ends (TE)**: 84 Brett Arce, Sr; 82 Nick Buckshaw, Rs Fr; 94 Elias Martinez, Jr; 85 Tanner Nehls, So; 88 David Shukri, Sr; **Offensive linemen (OL)**: 69 Michael Bamiro, Jr; 79 Omar Boothe, Rs Fr; 57 Joe Danaker, Sr; 76 Fernando Diaz, Jr; 67 Scott Hernandez, Jr; 62 Gerald Hubshman, Rs Fr; 72 Ryan Julien, Fr; 65 Mike Lisi, So; 74 Eric Mauler, Sr; 77 Karim Mohamed, Rs Fr; 68 Joe Pierre-Louis, Fr; 75 Cody Precht, So; 64 William Ruland, Rs Fr; 71 Steven Watts, Jr; 63 Mike White, Fr	**Defensive linemen (DL)**: 73 Dante Allen, Rs Fr; 90 Dimetrius Bernard, Jr; 97 Bryce Brantley, Sr; 98 Janna Chukumerije, Jr; 92 Jonathan Coats, Sr; 96 Connor Davis, Fr; 66 Kevin Hauter, So; 78 Dylan Joslin, Rs Fr; 52 Masengo Kabongo, Sr; 91 Victor Ochi, Rs Fr; 47 Leston Simpson, Jr; 45 Junior Solice, Jr; 95 Aaron Thompson, Fr; 49 Andres Trujillo, Jr; **Defensive end (DE)**: 60 Dimitry Russ, Rs Fr; **Linebackers (LB)**: 56 Casey Callahan, Jr; 44 Jawara Dudley, Jr; 33 Reginald Fracklin, 33; 57 Nick Iorio, So; 47 Jeremy Leggiero, Rs Fr; 53 Austen Moccia, Fr; 23 Dan Mulrooney, Sr; 48 Grant Nakwaasah, Jr; 55 Adam Nowak, Jr; 46 Julian Quintin, Rs Fr; 39 Christian Ricard, So; 20 Rich Vitale, Sr	**Defensive backs (DB)**: 2 Davonte Anderson, Jr; 37 Naim Cheeseboro, Rs Fr; 4 Avery Graham, Jr; 35 A.B. Granger, Fr; 36 Taj Johnson, Jr; 30 Deshawn Lindsay, Fr; 38 Winston Longdon, Jr; 22 Sheldon Armstrong, Jr; 21 Ivan May, Jr; 6 Greg Melendez, Sr; 41 Cedrick Moore, Sr; 28 Vincent Polo, Jr; 24 Dominick Reyes, Sr; 42 A.J. Valentine, Jr; 8 Jaheem Woods, Fr; **Cornerback (CB)**: 26 Lois Murray, Rs Fr; **Kicker/Punters (K/P)**: 51 Graham Ball **K**, So; 58 Przemyslaw Popek **K**, Fr; 53 Luke Allen **K/P**, Jr; 54 Wesley Skiffington **K/P**, Sr; 52 Ben Solis **K/P**, Fr	**Coaching staff**: Chuck Priore, Head coach; Jeff Behrman, Offensive coordinator/quarterbacks; Rob Neviaser, Defensive coordinator/defensive line; Carlton Goff, Wide receivers/recruiting coordinator; Lyle Hemphill, Defensive backs coach; Bobby McIntyre, Inside linebackers coach; Mark Murray, Offensive line; Tony Thompson, Tight ends coach; Jon Woods, Offensive line coach; Patrick Hatch, Running backs coach; Tyler Santucci, Graduate assistant/defensive line; Arin West, Graduate assistant/defensive backs; Michael Derice, Director of football operations; Marianne Laurel, Administrative assistant; Joe Maggio, Video Coordinator; Mary Tavornik, Head football athletic trainer; David Van Dyke, Director of speed, strength and conditioning; Kim Wodiska, Football academic advisor; Enzo Zucconi, Equipment Manager; Classes key: Fr – Freshman; first-year player So – Sophomore; second-year player Jr – Junior; third-year player Sr – Senior; fourth-year player **Bold** – Team captain Italics – Left team during the season. RS – Previously used a redshirt. – Redshirt during 2012 season – Injured for entire or majority of season and is eligible for a medical redshirt. Roster

== Broadcasting ==
All games were broadcast on the radio by 90.1 MHz WUSB FM on the Long Island and Southern Connecticut region. An online feed will be available at wusb.fm. In addition, all Seawolves away game were broadcast nationally on ESPN3, the game against Army will be broadcast nationally on CBSN, SNY and TWCS will carry the Syracuse matchup while MASN will carry the matchup against Liberty

== Schedule ==
Date	Time	Opponent	Rank	Site	TV	Result	Attendance
September 1	6:00 pm	Central Connecticut*	No. 17	Kenneth P. LaValle Stadium; Stony Brook, NY		W 49–17	6,094
September 8	6:00 pm	Pace*	No. 17	Kenneth P. LaValle Stadium; Stony Brook, NY		W 77–7	4,194
September 15	4:00 pm	at Syracuse*	No. 17	Carrier Dome; Syracuse, NY	TWCS/SNY/ESPN3	L 17–28	34,512
September 22	6:00 pm	Colgate*^{†}	No. 20	Kenneth P. LaValle Stadium; Stony Brook, NY		W 32–31	10,278
September 29	12:00 pm	at Army*	No. 18	Michie Stadium; West Point, NY	CBSSN	W 23–3	31,006
October 6	6:00 pm	Charleston Southern	No. 13	Kenneth P. LaValle Stadium; Stony Brook, NY		W 49–7	5,100
October 13	3:30 pm	at Coastal Carolina	No. 11	Brooks Stadium; Conway, SC	ESPN3	W 27–21	7,749
October 20	4:00 pm	Gardner–Webb	No. 10	Kenneth P. LaValle Stadium; Stony Brook, NY		W 41–10	5,791
October 27	1:00 pm	at Presbyterian	No. 10	Bailey Memorial Stadium; Clinton, SC	ESPN3	W 56–17	3,038
November 3	6:00 pm	VMI	No. 9	Kenneth P. LaValle Stadium; Stony Brook, NY		W 45–7	4,421
November 10	1:30 pm	at Liberty	No. 6	Williams Stadium; Lynchburg, VA	ESPN3/MASN	L 14–28	14,419
November 24	3:00 pm	No. 14 Villanova*	No. 10	Kenneth P. LaValle Stadium; Stony Brook, NY (FCS Playoffs First Round)	ESPN3	W 20-10	4,905
December 1	7:00 pm	at No. 2 Montana State*	No. 10	Bobcat Stadium; Bozeman, MT (FCS Playoffs Second Round)	ESPN3	L 10–16	15,257
*Non-conference game; ^{†}Homecoming; Rankings from The Sports Network Poll released prior to the game; All times are in Eastern time

== Game summaries ==
=== Central Connecticut ===
Central Connecticut at Stony Brook

Team	1	2	3	4	Total
Blue Devils	0	10	0	7	17
• Seawolves	21	7	14	7	49

- Date: September 1
- Location: Kenneth P. LaValle Stadium
  Stony Brook, NY
- Game start: 6:00 PM EST
- Elapsed time: 2:34
- Game attendance: 6,094
- Game weather: 78 °F (26 °C), clear, wind SE 13 mph (21 km/h)
- Referee: Tom McCreesh

Recap: Stony Brook opened their 2012 season at home for the first time since the 2008 season in front of 6,094 fans against the Central Connecticut Blue Devils resuming the old CCSU-SBU rivalry that existed while Stony Brook participated in the NEC. After a couple of non-scoring exchanges early in the first quarter, Stony Brook capitalized on a failed drive by Central Connecticut ending on the CCSU 4. It was followed by four-yard rush by Marcus Coker to take an early 7–0 lead. After another three-and-done by Central Connecticut the Seawolves responded with a quick offensive drive. Kevin Norrell received an eighty-nine-yard pass from Essington for another touchdown to extend the lead to 14-0 five minutes into the quarter. CCSU followed with a short non-scoring drive resulting in a punt at SBU 16. Stony Brook responded with another strong drive, this time by running back Miguel Maysonet who rushed for 89 yards to put the Seawolves ahead by 20 followed by another successful kick by transfer Graham Ball as the Seawolves took a commanding lead into the second quarter.

Momentum switched in Central Connecticut's favor early in the second quarter as they capitalized on their first drive with a 37-yard field goal. Stony Brook's next drive ended with an interception and CCSU followed by another Central Connecticut touchdown to cut Stony Brook's lead to 21-10. On the very next drive Stony Brook's offense responded with another touchdown with Maysonet receiving a 29-yard pass by Essington to take an 18-point lead into the second half.

The third quarter was all Stony Brook with the dual-punch of Maysonet and Coker accounting for most of the offensive yardage. Stony Brook took a commanding 42–10 lead into the fourth quarter. Both teams traded touchdowns in the fourth quarter resulting in a 49–17 win by Stony Brook opening their season with a victory for the first time since facing Colgate back in 2008's home opener.

A good offensive performance by Stony Brook totaled 489 total yards against CCSU 216 total yardage. The running game accounted for 301 yards with Miguel Maysonet rushing for 171 and Coker for 75 in his first game at Stony Brook. The Seawolves dominated the passing game (171 vs 64) and had better third-down efficiency. Central Connecticut possessed the ball 32:29 of the game.

Coach Priore commented on the game saying “It was a good win in a good atmosphere. I thought our defense played really fast early on. Overall, we played our brand of football”. Maysonet commented on the 84-yard run saying “(Mike) Lisi made a nice block, and as I saw the defender coming at me, I leaped over him. I kind of got tired at the end, but Adrian Coxson helped me into the end zone”. Quarterback Essington also commented on the powerful dual-back system saying “Having guys like Miguel and Marcus (Coker) really relieves a lot of pressure on myself. We have a lot of returners and playmakers, so my job is to get the ball to them and let them make plays”.

Series: Stony Brook leads 8-3

=== Pace ===
Pace at Stony Brook

Team	1	2	3	4	Total
Setters	0	0	0	7	7
• Seawolves	28	21	21	7	77

- Date: September 8
- Location: Kenneth P. LaValle Stadium
  Stony Brook, NY
- Game start: 6:00 PM EST
- Elapsed time: 2:45
- Game attendance: 4,194
- Game weather: 79 °F (26 °C), Cloudy/Rainy, Wind S 17 mph (27 km/h)
- Referee: James Smith

Stony Brook rebooted their historical series against Pace, a series last played in 1998 when the Seawolves initiated their transition to Division I. The Seawolves came out strong in front of 4,194 fans at Kenneth P. LaValle Stadium scoring on every drive in the first quarter taking a commanding 28-0 (Wesley Skiffington converting all the PATs) lead into the second quarter with over 179 yards of offense. Stony Brook outmatched their Division II opponent throughout the second quarter scoring on every drive to take a forty-two point lead into the locker room and shutting out Pace's offense for the entire first half.

Despite the heavy rain that poured during the halftime period, the game continued and the Stony Brook offense scored at will throughout the quarter adding twenty-one points to their lead. Both teams exchanged touchdowns in the final quarter for an eventual 77–7 defeat of Division II Pace Setters. Stony Brook extended their series lead to 11–2 against a historical New York metropolitan area rival. Stony Brook amounted to 693 yards of offense (504 rushing yards against 104 from Pace. J.Williams and D.Lawrence led Stony Brook's rushing offense while Maysonet and Coker had limited production in the game.

Coach Priore commented on the game saying “I'm proud of this team's effort and focus this week. We prepared correctly and it showed on the field. We had the opportunity to give kids some playing time”. Davon Lawrence who had expanded roles in the game also added “The offensive line did a great job of blocking for us tonight. They opened up a lot of holes tonight” while Iowa transfer Marcus Coker commented on the performance of the team adding "Our running attack is good. We have a lot of good running backs on this team. Jamie and Davon were exciting to watch."

Stony Brook improved to 2-0 while Pace fell to 0-2 for the season. Stony Brook holds a ten-game winning streak over Pace.

Series: Stony Brook leads 11-2

=== Syracuse ===
Stony Brook at Syracuse

Team	1	2	3	4	Total
Seawolves	10	7	0	0	17
• Orange	7	7	7	7	28

- Date: September 15
- Location: Carrier Dome
  Syracuse, NY
- Game start: 4:00 PM EST
- Elapsed time: 3:15
- Game attendance: 34,512
- Game weather: N/A (Indoor)
- Referee: Tracy Jones
- Television network: SNY

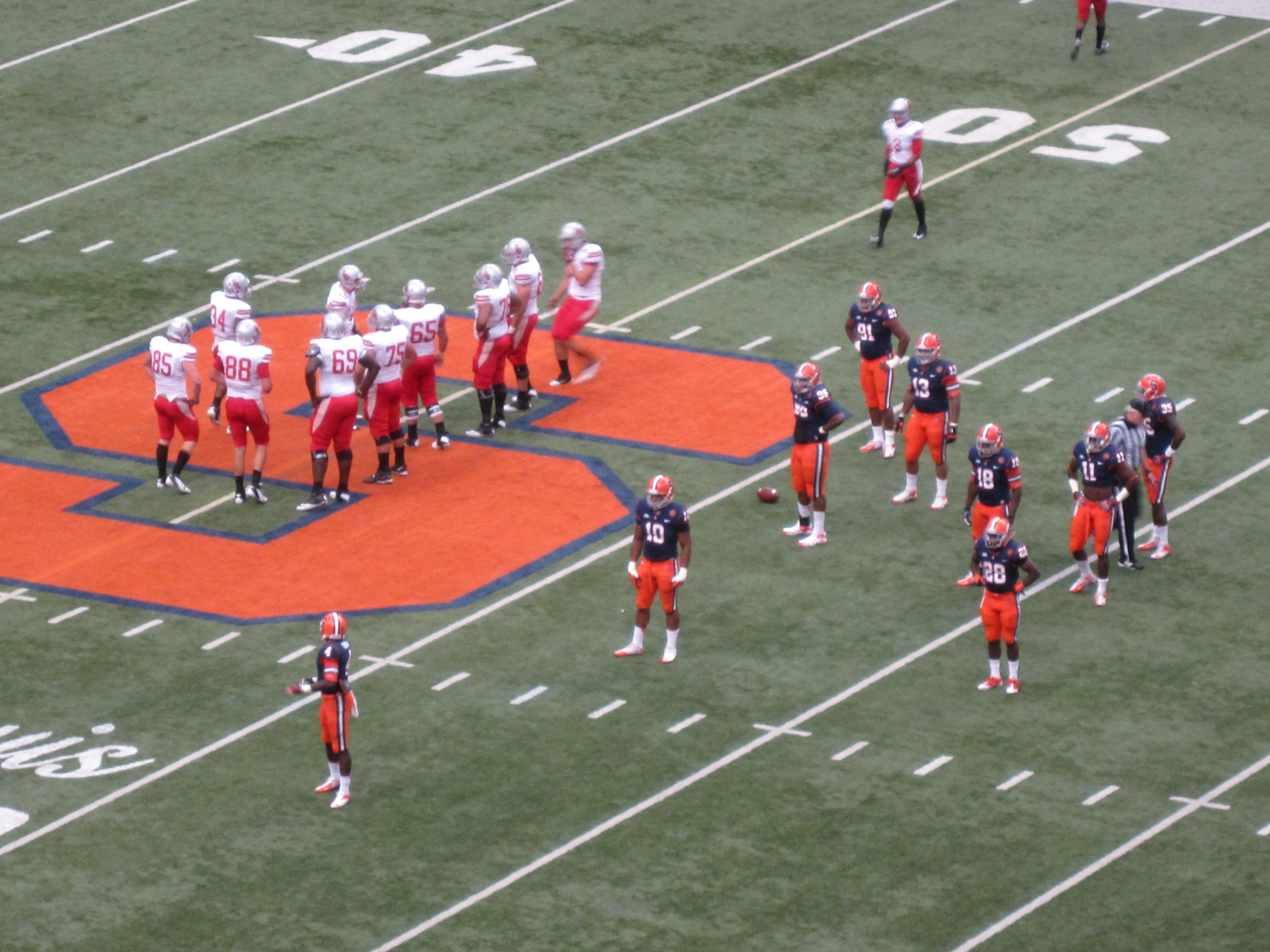
Stony Brook football at Carrier Dome

Stony Brook traveled upstate to face off against the Division I FBS Syracuse Orange of the Big East Conference, an intrastate matchup. Playing Syracuse for the first time in front of 34,512 fans, Stony Brook was the first one to score, after a 63-yard reception by Kevin Norrell to open up a 7-point lead four minutes into the first quarter. However, the lead didn't lasted long, Syracuse responded quickly with a touchdown of their own after a 61-yard sideline run by Prince-Tyson Gulley. On the next drive, Stony Brook advanced down the field but Syracuse came up with a defensive stop at 3rd & goal forcing the Seawolves to settle for a twenty-yard field goal to take a three-point lead. Neither team was able to capitalize on their following drives as the Seawolves took a 10–7 lead into the second quarter.

After a couple of non-scoring drives by both teams Syracuse scored on a twenty-seven-yard rush by Ashton Broyld to take a 14–10 lead. Stony Brook responded in the very next drive with a 71-yard rush by Miguel Maysonet in which he hurdled pass a Syracuse opponent, the play being one of the top plays in ESPNs flagship program SportsCenter, to regain a 17-14. Neither team scored for the rest of the half as Stony Brook took a three-point lead into the locker room.

Syracuse took the lead for good early in the third quarter on a 13-yard reception by Jarrod West and extended their lead in the fourth quarter with another 19-yard reception by Marcus Sales to hold off the Seawolves by a score of 28-17.

Overall Stony Brook amounted to 311 offensive yards against Syracuse's 549 but the Seawolves rushed for three more yards, 217, than the Orange. The Seawolves had two turnovers in the game in comparison to one by Syracuse and Stony Brook possessed the ball for 30:18. Stony Brook fell to 2-1 while Syracuse won their first game of the season.

Series: Syracuse leads 0-1

=== Colgate ===
Colgate at Stony Brook

Team	1	2	3	4	Total
Raiders	0	21	7	3	31
• Seawolves	10	7	3	12	32

- Date: September 22
- Location: Kenneth P. LaValle Stadium
  Stony Brook, NY
- Game start: 6:00 PM EST
- Elapsed time: 2:42
- Game attendance: 10,278
- Game weather: 68 °F (20 °C), Partly Cloudy, Wind S 17 mph (27 km/h)
- Referee: Kelvin Thorpe

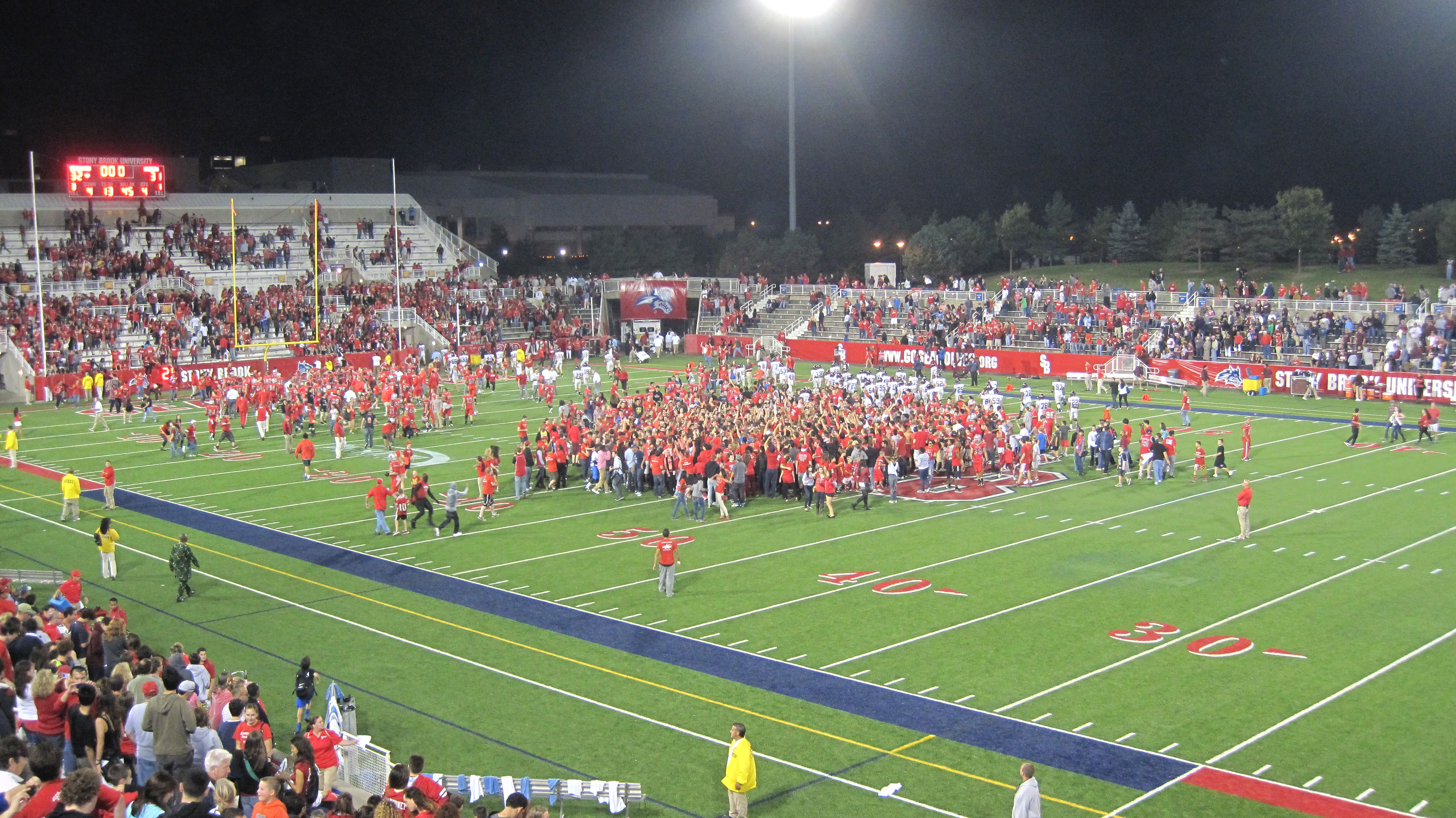
Stony Brook fans rush the field after memorable comeback over the Colgate Raider for the seventh straight Homecoming victory

Stony Brook returned home looking to get their third win of the season after a heartbreaking 17–28 loss to the Syracuse Orange the prior week. They faced off against the Colgate Raiders for the third time in history, in front of a sold out Wolfstock crowd of 10,278, the highest attendance for any sporting event at the university. The Seawolves offense attacked early scoring in their first drive capped by 16-yard run by Marcus Coker to put the Seawolves on board (Skiffington PAT) 7-0. After several non-scoring drives by both teams, Stony Brook capitalized on a 41-yard field goal by Skiffington to take a 10–0 lead into the second quarter.

With the momentum squarely on Stony Brook's favor, the Seawolves continued their offensive raid scoring another touchdown after a 34-yard reception by Jordan Gush (Skiffington PAT) to put the Seawolves up 17-0 two minutes into the quarter. However, the Raiders didn't back down, the Colgate offense responded in the very next drive scoring a touchdown of their own to cut Stony Brook's lead to ten points. After a three-and-out by Stony Brook, Colgate continued its offensive strike and scored a touchdown on a 51-yard reception by Ed Pavalko to cut further into Stony Brook's lead. Stony Brook's offense was unable to respond, and Colgate intercepted Essington's pass in SB30 to regain possession of the football with 1:34 left in the quarter. It was more than enough time for Colgate, as the Raider offense capitalized on the Seawolves turnover with another touchdown to take a 21–17 lead into the locker room.

Entering the third quarter the Seawolves held possession of the football but had to settle for a field goal to cut Colgate's lead to a single point. However, it wasn't long before the Colgate Raiders capitalized on another Seawolves turnover. Chris Horner sacked Essington and Dier recovered the ball for a 14-yard run to regain a 28–20 lead over the Seawolves for the rest of the quarter.

Opening the fourth quarter, the Seawolves scored on their very first drive capped by a 14-yard run by Coker to put the Seawolves back into the game, but failed to get the two-point conversion as the game remained 28–26 on Colgate's favor. Colgate responded with a field goal on their next drive but the Seawolves took the lead for good scoring a touchdown in the follow-up drive (Two Point Conversion failed) to get a 32–31 victory, their seventh straight homecoming win.

Head Coach Priore commented on the atmosphere saying "Tonight's atmosphere was a special one. When you have fans that are in the seats during warm-ups, generally, it's going to be a great crowd." and added "The biggest thing was not having a hangover after the Syracuse game. Good teams and good programs have the ability to overcome adversity." Overall, the Seawolves amounted to a total 427 yard against Colgate's 318. Stony Brook rushed for 272 yards while Maysonet alone rushed for 198, followed by Coker's 68 yards. The Seawolves possessed the ball for 32:22 and turned over the ball three times, highly uncharacteristic of the team. Stony Brook improved to 3-1 while Colgate fell to 1-3.

Series: Stony Brook leads 2-1

=== Army ===
Stony Brook at Army

Team	1	2	3	4	Total
• Seawolves	7	6	7	3	23
Black Knights	0	0	3	0	3

- Date: September 29
- Location: Michie Stadium
  West Point, NY
- Game start: 12:00 PM EST
- Elapsed time: 2:55
- Game attendance: 31,006
- Game weather: 60 °F (16 °C), partly cloudy, wind N 5 mph (8.0 km/h)
- Referee: Gary Patterson
- Television network: CBS Sports Network

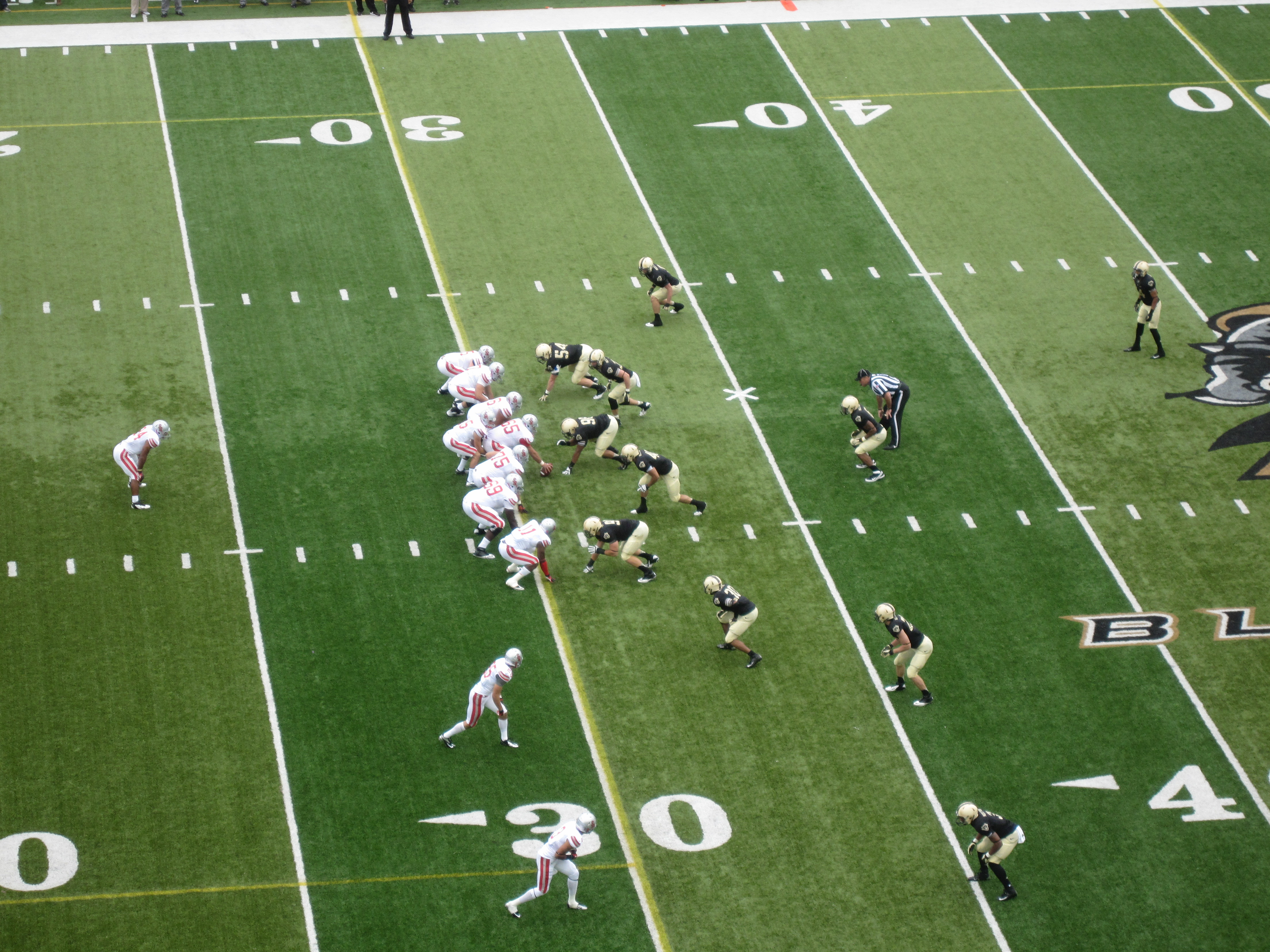
Stony Brook football on offense

Stony Brook traveled to West Point, New York, to face off against their second FBS team of the season, the Army Black Knights, for the first time in history. In front of 31,006 fans Stony Brook wasted no time. The offense struck early in their first drive led by 49-yard scoring drive by Miguel Maysonet (Skiffington PAT) to put the Seawolves up 7–0. Army's next drive ended with a fumble recovered by Stony Brook's Davonte Anderson at SB 31 but the Seawolves weren't able to capitalize as Army returned the favor with a forced fumble on quarterback Kyle Essington recovered by Army. Neither team scored for the rest of the quarter. The Seawolves opened the second quarter with a 27-yard field goal by Skiffington to extend the lead to 10–0. Stony Brook's offense continued to shut down the Army offensive forcing two more Army fumbles at the SB35 and SB 7. Skiffington kicked a 44-yard field goal as the Seawolves took a 13–0 lead into the locker room.

Series: Stony Brook leads, 1–0

=== Charleston Southern ===
Charleston Southern at Stony Brook

Team	1	2	3	4	Total
Buccaneers	0	7	0	0	7
• Seawolves	7	21	21	0	49

- Date: October 6
- Location: Kenneth P. LaValle Stadium
  Stony Brook, NY
- Game start: 6:00 PM EST
- Elapsed time: 2:38
- Game attendance: 5,100
- Game weather: 68 °F (20 °C), cloudy, wind WNW 18 mph (29 km/h)
- Referee: Stuart Mullins

Stony Brook will open their conference season at home against the Charleston Southern Buccaneers, after defeating the Bucs 50–31 at Charleston the previous year. The Seawolves hold a 3–1 all-time series lead against CSU.

Series: Stony Brook leads 4–1

=== Coastal Carolina ===
Stony Brook at Coastal Carolina

Team	1	2	3	4	Total
• Seawolves	7	7	7	6	27
Chanticleers	7	7	0	7	21

- Date: October 13
- Location: Brooks Stadium
  Conway, SC
- Game start: 3:30 PM EST
- Elapsed time: 2:46
- Game attendance: 7,749
- Game weather: 72 °F (22 °C), Clear, Wind NE 10 mph (16 km/h)
- Referee: David Epperly
- TV announcers (ESPN3): Mark Bryant, Nate Ross

After facing the Buccaneers, Stony Brook will return to South Carolina to face conference rival Chanticleers. Stony Brook defeated the Chanticleers 42–0 at LaValle Stadium the previous season as the Seawolves will attempt to keep Coastal Carolina win-less in the Series.

Series: Stony Brook leads 5-0

=== Gardner-Webb ===
Gardner-Webb at Stony Brook

Team	1	2	3	4	Total
Runnin' Bulldogs	0	3	7	0	10
• Seawolves	10	3	14	14	41

- Date: October 20
- Location: Kenneth P. LaValle Stadium
  Stony Brook, NY
- Game start: 4:00 PM EST
- Elapsed time: 2:23
- Game attendance: 5,791
- Game weather: 67 °F (19 °C), Clear, Wind S 11 mph (18 km/h)
- Referee: Tom McCreesh

The Seawolves will return home after back to back weeks in South Carolina to face off the Gardner-Webb Runnin' Bulldogs in conference play. Stony Brook defeated the Bulldogs 76–28 at Boilings Springs the previous season and will attempt to defeat Bulldogs for the fourth straight year.

Series: Stony Brook leads 4-1

=== Presbyterian ===
Stony Brook at Presbyterian

Team	1	2	3	4	Total
• Seawolves	14	14	14	14	56
Blue Hose	3	7	7	0	17

- Date: October 27
- Location: Bailey Memorial Stadium
  Clinton, SC
- Game start: 1:00 PM EST
- Elapsed time: 2:51
- Game attendance: 3,038
- Game weather: 70 °F (21 °C), Partly Cloudy, Wind N 10 mph (16 km/h)
- Referee: Jeff Heaser
- TV announcers (ESPN3): Evan Leplar, Nate Ross

Recap:

Series: Stony Brook leads 5 - 0

=== VMI ===
Virginia Military Inst. at Stony Brook

Team	1	2	3	4	Total
Keydets	0	0	7	0	7
• Seawolves	14	14	7	10	45

- Date: November 3
- Location: Kenneth P. LaValle Stadium
  Stony Brook, NY
- Game start: 6:00 PM EST
- Elapsed time: 2:36
- Game attendance: 4,421
- Game weather: 53 °F (12 °C), Cloudy, Wind NW 21 mph (34 km/h)
- Referee: Ron Cherry

Series: Stony Brook leads 5 - 0

=== Liberty ===
Stony Brook at Liberty

Team	1	2	3	4	Total
Seawolves	7	0	0	7	14
• Flames	0	14	7	7	28

- Date: November 10
- Location: Williams Stadium
  Lynchburg, VA
- Game start: 3:30 PM EST
- Elapsed time: 3:05
- Game attendance: 14,419
- Game weather: 71 °F (22 °C), Clear, Wind S 4 mph (6.4 km/h)
- Referee: D. Epperley
- TV announcers (ESPN3): Rod Smith, Patrick Kinas

Stony Brook traveled down to Lynchburg in hopes of gaining their second consecutive outright championship. Stony Brook faced off against Liberty in front of 14,419 fans Series: 2-3

=== Villanova (NCAA First Round) ===
NCAA Division I Football Championship: First Round

Team	1	2	3	4	Total
Villanova	0	0	3	7	10
• Seawolves	0	14	3	3	20

- Date: November 24
- Location: Kenneth P. LaValle Stadium
  Stony Brook, NY
- Game start: 3:00 PM EST
- Elapsed time: 2:55
- Game attendance: 4,905
- Game weather: 41 °F (5 °C), Cloudy, Wind W 23 mph (37 km/h) with 33 mph (53 km/h) gust
- Referee: D. Leathers
- TV announcers (ESPN3): Dan Gutowsky, John Gregory

Due to the three-way tie breaker rules in the Big South Conference, the Seawolves were unable to clinch the automatic bid to the NCAA Division I Football Championship, which went to Coastal Carolina by winning all their Big South road games. However, the Seawolves were selected as at-large candidates to enter the playoffs, the first at-large bid ever for any program at the university. Stony Brook put a bid for a playoff home game and was selected to host the Villanova Wildcats, the CAA Automatic qualifier, and a future rival of the Seawolves when Stony Brook enters the CAA in 2013.

Series: Stony Brook leads 1-0

=== Montana State (NCAA Second Round) ===
NCAA Division I Football Championship: Second Round

Team	1	2	3	4	Total
Seawolves	0	3	0	7	10
• Bobcats	7	3	3	3	16

- Date: December 1
- Location: Bobcat Stadium, Bozeman, MT
- Game start: 7:00 PM EST
- Elapsed time: 2:56
- Game attendance: 15,257
- Game weather: 53 °F (12 °C), cloudy
- Referee: Wally Righton
- TV announcers (ESPN3): Peter Young, Corey Chavous

Series: 0-1

== Post-season honors ==
Big South Offensive Player of the Year: Miguel Maysonet

=== First-team ===
Offense

- RB - Miguel Maysonet, Sr., Stony Brook
- WR - Kevin Norrell, Sr., Stony Brook
- OL - Michael Bamiro, R-Jr., Stony Brook
- OL - Mike Lisi, Soph., Stony Brook

Defense

- DL - Jonathan Coats, Sr., Stony Brook
- LB - Jawara Dudley, Jr., Stony Brook
- DB - Dominick Reyes, R-Sr., Stony Brook

Special teams:

- wr - Wesley Skiffington, R-Sr., Stony Brook

=== Second-Team ===
Offense

- QB - Kyle Essington, Sr., Stony Brook
- OL - Scott Hernandez, R-Jr., Stony Brook

Defense

- DB - Davonte Anderson, Jr., Stony Brook
- DB - Cedrick Moore, Sr., Stony Brook

=== Walter Payton Award ===
Senior RB Miguel Maysonet was the runner-up candidate for the Walter Payton Award behind Old Dominion sophomore quarterback Taylor Heinicke. The Walter Payton Award is given to the most outstanding player in the Football Championship Subdivision.

== FCS rankings ==
Ranking movements Legend: ██ Increase in ranking ██ Decrease in ranking ( ) = First-place votes
	Week														
Poll	Pre	1	2	3	4	5	6	7	8	9	10	11	12	13	Final
The Sports Network	17	17	17	20	18	13	11	10 (1)	10 (1)	9 (4)	6 (4)	12	10		
Coaches	17	17	16	20	18	13	11	10	9	9	8	13	13		
