= 2012 North Carolina A&T Aggies football team =

American college football season

2012 North Carolina A&T Aggies football
- Conference: Mid-Eastern Athletic Conference
- Record: 7–4 (5–3 MEAC)
- Head coach: Rod Broadway (2nd season)
- Offensive coordinator: Joe Pizzo (2nd season)
- Defensive coordinator: Sam Washington (2nd season)
- Home stadium: Aggie Stadium

2012 Mid-Eastern Athletic Conference football standings
	Conf.			Overall
Team	W		L	W		L
No. 22 Bethune–Cookman $^	8	–	0	9	–	3
Howard	6	–	2	7	–	4
North Carolina A&T	5	–	3	7	–	4
North Carolina Central	5	–	3	6	–	5
Delaware State	5	–	3	6	–	5
South Carolina State	4	–	4	5	–	6
Florida A&M	4	–	4	4	–	7
Hampton	3	–	5	3	–	7
Norfolk State	2	–	6	4	–	7
Morgan State	2	–	6	3	–	8
Savannah State	0	–	8	1	–	10
$ – Conference champion; ^ – FCS playoff participant; Rankings from The Sports Network poll

The 2012 North Carolina A&T Aggies football team represented North Carolina A&T State University as a member of Mid-Eastern Athletic Conference (MEAC) during the 2012 NCAA Division I FCS football season. Led by second-year head coach Rod Broadway, the Aggies compiled an overall record of 7–4 with a mark of 5–3 in conference play, placing in a three-way tie for third in the MEAC. North Carolina A&T played home games at Aggie Stadium in Greensboro, North Carolina.

== Schedule ==
Date	Time	Opponent	Site	TV	Result	Attendance
September 1	6:00 pm	at Coastal Carolina*	Brooks Stadium; Conway, SC		L 13–29	9,314
September 8	6:00 pm	West Virginia State*	Aggie Stadium; Greensboro, NC		W 77–0	7,084
September 15	6:00 pm	Virginia–Lynchburg*	Aggie Stadium; Greensboro, NC		W 40–7	10,852
September 27	7:00 pm	Morgan State	Aggie Stadium; Greensboro, NC	ESPNU	L 18–21	14,015
October 6	4:00 pm	at Bethune–Cookman	Municipal Stadium; Daytona Beach, FL		L 12–28	10,181
October 13	1:30 pm	Howard	Aggie Stadium; Greensboro, NC		W 38–10	13,422
October 20	1:30 pm	at Delaware State	Alumni Stadium; Dover, DE		L 0–24	6,172
October 27	1:30 pm	Norfolk State^{†}	Aggie Stadium; Greensboro, NC		W 30–9	20,356
November 3	1:30 pm	Florida A&M	Aggie Stadium; Greensboro, NC		W 16–3	6,346
November 10	1:30 pm	South Carolina State	Aggie Stadium; Greensboro, NC (rivalry)		W 17–7	10,432
November 17	2:00 pm	at North Carolina Central	O'Kelly–Riddick Stadium; Durham, NC (rivalry)		W 22–16 ^{OT}	11,184
*Non-conference game; ^{†}Homecoming; All times are in Eastern time

== Coaching staff ==
2012 North Carolina A&T Aggies coaching staff
Head coach: Head coach – Rod Broadway; Offensive coaches: Running Backs - Shawn Gibbs; Defensive coaches: Defensive coordinator/defensive backs – Sam Washington; Defensive line – Courtney Coard; Defensive Assistant — Charles Cheek	Administrative staff: Athletic Director (A.D.) - Earl M. Hilton III; Administrative Support Associate for Football - Zanetta Thompson
