= 2012 Presbyterian Blue Hose football team =

American college football season

2012 Presbyterian Blue Hose football
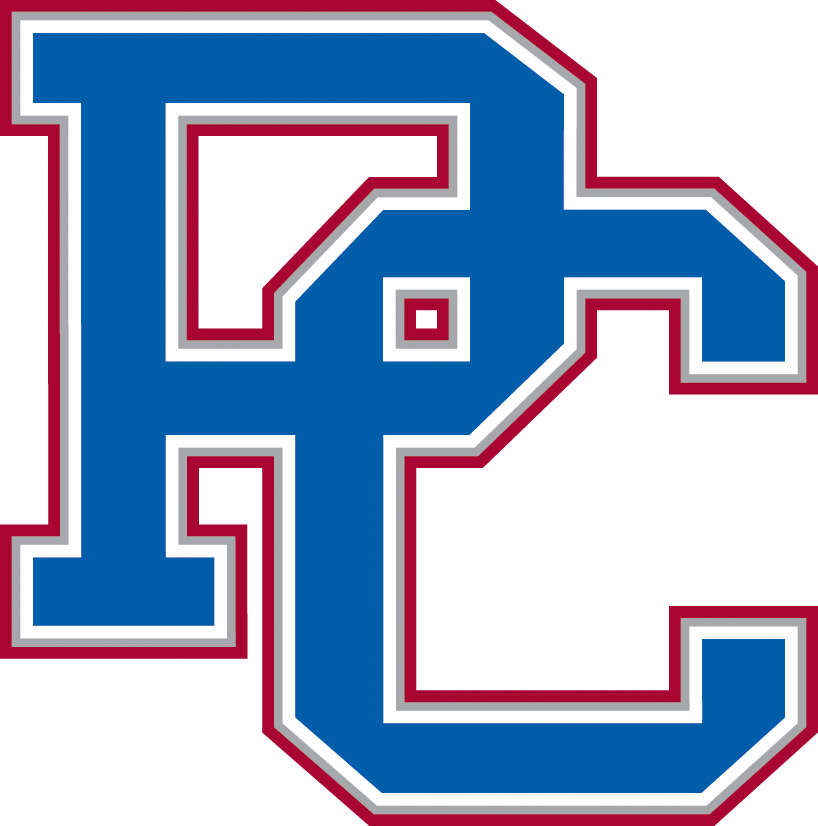
- Conference: Big South Conference
- Record: 2–9 (0–6 Big South)
- Head coach: Harold Nichols (4th season)
- Offensive coordinator: Todd Varn
- Defensive coordinator: Drew Watson
- Home stadium: Bailey Memorial Stadium

2012 Big South Conference football standings
	Conf.			Overall
Team	W		L	W		L
No. 10 Stony Brook +^	5	–	1	10	–	3
Coastal Carolina +^	5	–	1	8	–	5
Liberty +	5	–	1	6	–	5
Charleston Southern	3	–	3	5	–	6
Gardner–Webb	2	–	4	3	–	8
VMI	1	–	5	2	–	9
Presbyterian	0	–	6	2	–	9
$ – Conference champion; ^ – FCS playoff participant; Rankings from The Sports Network poll

The 2012 Presbyterian Blue Hose football team represented Presbyterian College in the 2012 NCAA Division I FCS football season. They were led by fourth-year head coach Harold Nichols and played their home games at Bailey Memorial Stadium. They are a member of the Big South Conference. They finished the season 2–9, 0–6 in Big South play to finish in last place.

== Schedule ==
Date	Time	Opponent	Site	TV	Result	Attendance
September 1	2:00 pm	Brevard*	Bailey Memorial Stadium; Clinton, SC		W 45–10	3,439
September 8	7:00 pm	at Georgia Tech*	Bobby Dodd Stadium; Atlanta, GA	ESPN3	L 3–59	41,678
September 15	12:30 pm	at Vanderbilt*	Vanderbilt Stadium; Nashville, TN	CSS	L 0–58	35,491
September 22	12:00 pm	Furman*	Bailey Memorial Stadium; Clinton, SC	CSS	L 21–31	5,370
September 29	6:00 pm	at Davidson*	Richardson Stadium; Davidson, NC		W 28–13	4,111
October 6	1:30 pm	at VMI	Alumni Memorial Field; Lexington, VA	ESPN3	L 7–17	5,507
October 13	2:00 pm	Liberty	Bailey Memorial Stadium; Clinton, SC	Flames Sports Network	L 7–56	5,335
October 20	1:30 pm	at Charleston Southern	Buccaneer Field; Charleston, SC	ESPN3	L 21–31	3,413
October 27	1:00 pm	No. 10 Stony Brook	Bailey Memorial Stadium; Clinton, SC	ESPN3	L 17–56	3,038
November 10	1:00 pm	Coastal Carolina	Bailey Memorial Stadium; Clinton, SC		L 7–65	4,381
November 17	1:30 pm	at Gardner–Webb	Ernest W. Spangler Stadium; Boiling Springs, NC		L 15–21	1,790
*Non-conference game; Rankings from The Sports Network Poll released prior to the game; All times are in Eastern time

- Source: Schedule

== Game summaries ==
=== Brevard ===
	1	2	3	4	Total
Tornados	0	0	10	0	10
Blue Hose	14	10	7	14	45

=== At Georgia Tech ===
	1	2	3	4	Total
Blue Hose	0	0	0	3	3
Yellow Jackets	21	3	21	14	59

=== At Vanderbilt ===
	1	2	3	4	Total
Blue Hose	0	0	0	0	0
Commodores	10	17	28	3	58

=== Furman ===
	1	2	3	4	Total
Paladins	14	10	7	0	31
Blue Hose	0	0	7	14	21

=== At Davidson ===
	1	2	3	4	Total
Blue Hose	7	0	7	14	28
Wildcats	0	7	6	0	13

=== At VMI ===
	1	2	3	4	Total
Blue Hose	0	0	0	7	7
Keydets	3	7	7	0	17

=== Liberty ===
	1	2	3	4	Total
Flames	21	14	14	7	56
Blue Hose	0	7	0	0	7

=== At Charleston Southern ===
	1	2	3	4	Total
Blue Hose	14	7	0	0	21
Buccaneers	7	6	11	7	31

=== Stony Brook ===
	1	2	3	4	Total
(10) Seawolves	14	14	14	14	56
Blue Hose	3	7	7	0	17

=== Coastal Carolina ===
	1	2	3	4	Total
Chanticleers	22	22	14	7	65
Blue Hose	0	7	0	0	7

=== At Gardner-Webb ===
	1	2	3	4	Total
Blue Hose	0	2	0	13	15
Runnin' Bulldogs	7	6	0	8	21
