= 2012 Delaware State Hornets football team =

American college football season

2012 Delaware State Hornets football
- Conference: Mid-Eastern Athletic Conference
- Record: 6–5 (5–3 MEAC)
- Head coach: Kermit Blount (2nd season)
- Offensive coordinator: Arrington Jones (2nd season)
- Defensive coordinator: Mike Ketchum (2nd season)
- Home stadium: Alumni Stadium

2012 Mid-Eastern Athletic Conference football standings
	Conf.			Overall
Team	W		L	W		L
No. 22 Bethune–Cookman $^	8	–	0	9	–	3
Howard	6	–	2	7	–	4
North Carolina A&T	5	–	3	7	–	4
North Carolina Central	5	–	3	6	–	5
Delaware State	5	–	3	6	–	5
South Carolina State	4	–	4	5	–	6
Florida A&M	4	–	4	4	–	7
Hampton	3	–	5	3	–	7
Norfolk State	2	–	6	4	–	7
Morgan State	2	–	6	3	–	8
Savannah State	0	–	8	1	–	10
$ – Conference champion; ^ – FCS playoff participant; Rankings from The Sports Network poll

The 2012 Delaware State Hornets football team represented Delaware State University as a member of the Mid-Eastern Athletic Conference (MEAC) in the 2012 NCAA Division I FCS football season. Led by second-year head coach Kermit Blount, the Hornets compiled an overall record of 6–5 with a mark of 5–3 in conference play, placing in a three-way tie for third in the MEAC. Delaware State played home games at Alumni Stadium in Dover, Delaware.

== Schedule ==
Date	Time	Opponent	Site	TV	Result	Attendance
September 1	2:00 pm	VMI*	Alumni Stadium; Dover, DE		W 17–10	2,952
September 8	3:30 pm	at No. 15 Delaware*	Delaware Stadium; Newark, DE (Route 1 Rivalry)	NBCSN	L 14–38	16,898
September 15	7:00 pm	at Cincinnati*	Nippert Stadium; Cincinnati, OH	ESPN3	L 7–23	27,112
September 22	6:00 pm	Florida A&M	Alumni Stadium; Dover, DE		L 22–24	2,758
October 6	1:00 pm	at Norfolk State	William "Dick" Price Stadium; Norfolk, VA		W 20–17	6,532
October 13	1:30 pm	South Carolina State	Alumni Stadium; Dover, DE		W 31–17	3,794
October 20	1:30 pm	North Carolina A&T^{†}	Alumni Stadium; Dover, DE		W 24–0	6,172
October 25	7:30 pm	at Morgan State	Hughes Stadium; Baltimore, MD	ESPNU	W 28–23	3,012
November 3	2:00 pm	at North Carolina Central	O'Kelly–Riddick Stadium; Durham, NC		L 20–23 ^{OT}	12,742
November 10	1:00 pm	Hampton	Alumni Stadium; Dover, DE		W 35–27	2,249
November 17	1:00 pm	at Howard	William H. Greene Stadium; Washington, DC		L 34–41	2,505
*Non-conference game; ^{†}Homecoming; Rankings from The Sports Network Poll released prior to the game; All times are in Eastern time
