= 2012 Florida A&M Rattlers football team =

American college football season

2012 Florida A&M Rattlers football
- Conference: Mid-Eastern Athletic Conference
- Record: 4–7 (4–4 MEAC)
- Head coach: Joe Taylor (5th season; first 9 games); Earl Holmes (interim, final 2 games)
- Defensive coordinator: Earl Holmes (5th season)
- Home stadium: Bragg Memorial Stadium

2012 Mid-Eastern Athletic Conference football standings
	Conf.			Overall
Team	W		L	W		L
No. 22 Bethune–Cookman $^	8	–	0	9	–	3
Howard	6	–	2	7	–	4
North Carolina A&T	5	–	3	7	–	4
North Carolina Central	5	–	3	6	–	5
Delaware State	5	–	3	6	–	5
South Carolina State	4	–	4	5	–	6
Florida A&M	4	–	4	4	–	7
Hampton	3	–	5	3	–	7
Norfolk State	2	–	6	4	–	7
Morgan State	2	–	6	3	–	8
Savannah State	0	–	8	1	–	10
$ – Conference champion; ^ – FCS playoff participant; Rankings from The Sports Network poll

The 2012 Florida A&M Rattlers football team represented Florida A&M University as a member of the Mid-Eastern Athletic Conference (MEAC) in the 2012 NCAA Division I FCS football season. The Rattlers were led by fifth year head coach Joe Taylor and played their home games at Bragg Memorial Stadium. They finished the season 4–7 overall and 4–4 in MEAC play to tie for sixth place.

Taylor stepped down from his head coaching role with two games remaining in the season.

== Schedule ==
Date	Time	Opponent	Site	TV	Result	Attendance
September 1	7:00 pm	at Tennessee State*	LP Field; Nashville, TN (John Merritt Classic)		L 14–17	15,652
September 8	7:00 pm	at No. 5 (FBS) Oklahoma*	Gaylord Family Oklahoma Memorial Stadium; Norman, OK	PPV	L 13–69	84,852
September 15	6:00 pm	Hampton	Bragg Memorial Stadium; Tallahassee, FL		W 44–20	17,871
September 22	6:00 pm	at Delaware State	Alumni Stadium; Dover, DE		W 24–22	2,758
September 29	3:30 pm	vs. Southern*	Georgia Dome; Atlanta, GA (Atlanta Football Classic)	NBCSN	L 14–21	41,042
October 6	1:00 pm	at Howard	William H. Greene Stadium; Washington, D.C.		L 10–17	3,589
October 13	6:00 pm	Savannah State	Bragg Memorial Stadium; Tallahassee, FL		W 44–3	12,561
October 20	6:00 pm	South Carolina State	Bragg Memorial Stadium; Tallahassee, FL		L 20–27 ^{OT}	11,106
November 3	1:30 pm	at North Carolina A&T	Aggie Stadium; Greensboro, NC		L 3–16	6,346
November 10	3:00 pm	North Carolina Central	Bragg Memorial Stadium; Tallahassee, FL		W 22–21	14,768
November 17	2:00 pm	vs. No. 25 Bethune–Cookman	Florida Citrus Bowl; Orlando, FL (Florida Classic)	ESPNC	L 16–21	32,317
*Non-conference game; Rankings from The Sports Network Poll released prior to the game; All times are in Eastern time
