= 2012 Norfolk State Spartans football team =

American college football season

2012 Norfolk State Spartans football
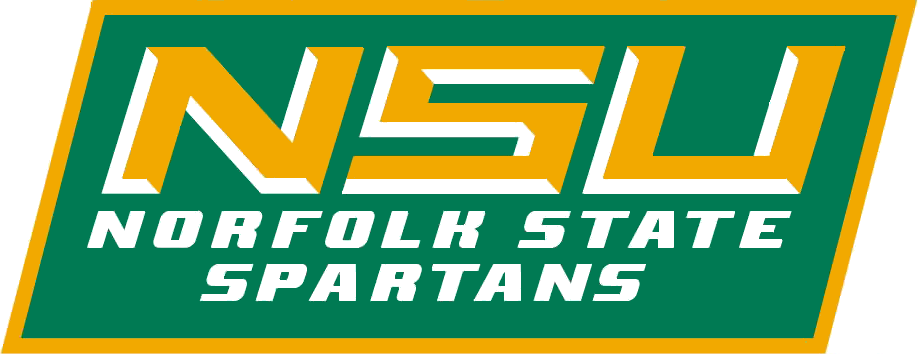
- Conference: Mid-Eastern Athletic Conference
- Record: 4–7 (2–6 MEAC)
- Head coach: Pete Adrian (8th season)
- Offensive coordinator: Howard Feggins (1st season)
- Defensive coordinator: Mark DeBastiani (8th season)
- Home stadium: William "Dick" Price Stadium

2012 Mid-Eastern Athletic Conference football standings
	Conf.			Overall
Team	W		L	W		L
No. 22 Bethune–Cookman $^	8	–	0	9	–	3
Howard	6	–	2	7	–	4
North Carolina A&T	5	–	3	7	–	4
North Carolina Central	5	–	3	6	–	5
Delaware State	5	–	3	6	–	5
South Carolina State	4	–	4	5	–	6
Florida A&M	4	–	4	4	–	7
Hampton	3	–	5	3	–	7
Norfolk State	2	–	6	4	–	7
Morgan State	2	–	6	3	–	8
Savannah State	0	–	8	1	–	10
$ – Conference champion; ^ – FCS playoff participant; Rankings from The Sports Network poll

The 2012 Norfolk State Spartans football team represented Norfolk State University in the 2012 NCAA Division I FCS football season. They were led by eighth-year head coach Pete Adrian and played their home games at William "Dick" Price Stadium. They are a member of the Mid-Eastern Athletic Conference (MEAC). They finished the season 4–7, 2–6 in MEAC play to finish in a tie for ninth place.

== Schedule ==
Date	Time	Opponent	Site	TV	Result	Attendance
September 1	6:00 pm	Virginia State*	William "Dick" Price Stadium; Norfolk, VA (Labor Day Classic)	SSC	W 24–0	24,322
September 8	7:00 pm	at Liberty*	Williams Stadium; Lynchburg, VA		W 31–24	15,826
September 15	4:00 pm	Howard	William "Dick" Price Stadium; Norfolk, VA		L 36–37 ^{OT}	10,938
September 22	2:00 pm	at Ohio*	Peden Stadium; Athens, OH	ESPN3	L 10–44	23,673
September 29	2:00 pm	at South Carolina State	Oliver C. Dawson Stadium; Orangeburg, SC		L 0–14	20,025
October 6	4:00 pm	Delaware State	William "Dick" Price Stadium; Norfolk, VA	SSC	L 17–20	6,532
October 13	1:00 pm	at Hampton	Armstrong Stadium; Hampton, VA (Battle of the Bay)		L 14–28	8,500
October 20	4:00 pm	at Bethune-Cookman	Municipal Stadium; Daytona Beach, FL		L 3–48	6,253
October 27	1:30 pm	at North Carolina A&T	Aggie Stadium; Greensboro, NC		L 9–30	20,356
November 3	2:00 pm	Savannah State^{†}	William "Dick" Price Stadium; Norfolk, VA	SSC	W 33–21	16,269
November 10	1:00 pm	Morgan State	William "Dick" Price Stadium; Norfolk, VA	SSC	W 30–0	6,428
*Non-conference game; ^{†}Homecoming; All times are in Eastern time

- Source: Schedule

== Ranking movements ==
Ranking movements Legend: ██ Increase in ranking ██ Decrease in ranking RV = Received votes
	Week																
Poll	Pre	1	2	3	4	5	6	7	8	9	10	11	12	13	14	15	Final
Sports Network	RV	RV	RV	RV	RV												
Coaches	23	24	22	RV	RV												
