= 2012 Howard Bison football team =

American college football season

2012 Howard Bison football
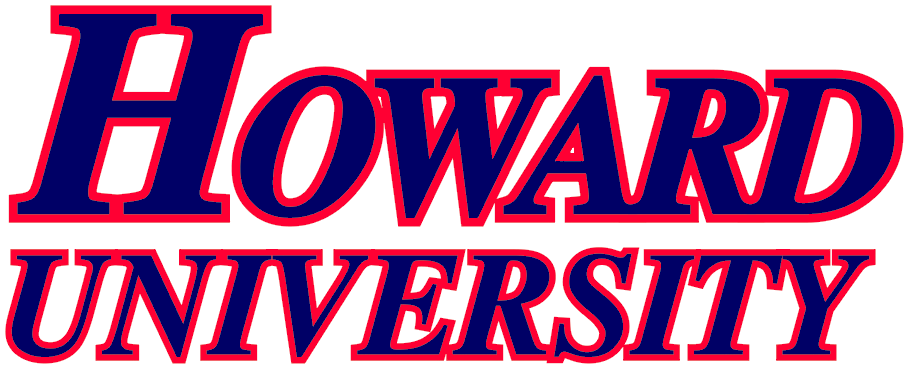
- Conference: Mid-Eastern Athletic Conference
- Record: 7–4 (6–2 MEAC)
- Head coach: Gary Harrell (2nd season)
- Offensive coordinator: Ted White (2nd season)
- Co-offensive coordinator: Chennis Berry (2nd season)
- Defensive coordinator: Rayford Petty (2nd season)
- Home stadium: William H. Greene Stadium

2012 Mid-Eastern Athletic Conference football standings
| | Conf. | | | Overall |
| Team | W | | L | W | | L |
|---|---|---|---|---|---|---|
| No. 22 Bethune–Cookman $^ | 8 | – | 0 | 9 | – | 3 |
| Howard | 6 | – | 2 | 7 | – | 4 |
| North Carolina A&T | 5 | – | 3 | 7 | – | 4 |
| North Carolina Central | 5 | – | 3 | 6 | – | 5 |
| Delaware State | 5 | – | 3 | 6 | – | 5 |
| South Carolina State | 4 | – | 4 | 5 | – | 6 |
| Florida A&M | 4 | – | 4 | 4 | – | 7 |
| Hampton | 3 | – | 5 | 3 | – | 7 |
| Norfolk State | 2 | – | 6 | 4 | – | 7 |
| Morgan State | 2 | – | 6 | 3 | – | 8 |
| Savannah State | 0 | – | 8 | 1 | – | 10 |
$ – Conference champion; ^ – FCS playoff participant; Rankings from The Sports Network poll

The 2012 Howard Bison football team represented Howard University as a member of the Mid-Eastern Athletic Conference (MEAC) during the 2012 NCAA Division I FCS football season. Led by second-year head coach Gary Harrell, the Bison compiled an overall record of 7–4 with a mark of 6–2, placing second in the MEAC. Howard played home games at William H. Greene Stadium in Washington, D.C.

== Schedule ==
| Date | Time | Opponent | Site | TV | Result | Attendance |
|---|---|---|---|---|---|---|
| September 1 | 3:30 pm | vs. Morehouse* | Robert F. Kennedy Memorial Stadium; Washington, DC (Nation's Football Classic) | | W 30–29 | 16,911 |
| September 8 | 3:30 pm | at Rutgers* | High Point Solutions Stadium; Piscataway, NJ | SNY | L 0–26 | 50,855 |
| September 15 | 4:00 pm | at Norfolk State | William "Dick" Price Stadium; Norfolk, VA | | W 37–36 ^{OT} | 10,938 |
| September 29 | 1:00 pm | Savannah State | William H. Greene Stadium; Washington, DC | | W 56–9 | 2,955 |
| October 6 | 1:00 pm | Florida A&M | William H. Greene Stadium; Washington, DC | | W 17–10 | 3,589 |
| October 13 | 1:30 pm | at North Carolina A&T | Aggie Stadium; Greensboro, NC | | L 10–38 | 13,422 |
| October 20 | 1:00 pm | Morgan State | William H. Greene Stadium; Washington, DC (rivalry) | | W 21–20 | 10,305 |
| October 27 | 1:30 pm | at South Carolina State | Oliver C. Dawson Stadium; Orangeburg, SC | | L 23–41 | 19,187 |
| November 3 | 1:00 pm | Hampton | William H. Greene Stadium; Washington, DC (The Real HU) | | W 20–10 | 3,086 |
| November 10 | 2:00 pm | at No. 7 Georgia Southern* | Paulson Stadium; Statesboro, GA | | L 26–69 | 18,069 |
| November 17 | 1:00 pm | Delaware State | William H. Greene Stadium; Washington, DC | | W 41–34 | 2,505 |
*Non-conference game; Rankings from The Sports Network Poll released prior to the game; All times are in Eastern time
