= Earl Holmes =

American football player and coach (born 1973)

Biographical details
- Born: April 28, 1973 (age 53); Tallahassee, Florida, U.S.

Playing career
- 1992–1995: Florida A&M
- 1996–2001: Pittsburgh Steelers
- 2002: Cleveland Browns
- 2003–2005: Detroit Lions
- Position: Linebacker

Coaching career (HC unless noted)
- 2008–2010: Florida A&M (co-DC/LB)
- 2011–2012: Florida A&M (DC/LB)
- 2012–2014: Florida A&M

Head coaching record
- Overall: 6–16

Accomplishments and honors

Awards
- MEAC Defensive Player of the Year (1995); 2× First-team All-MEAC (1994, 1995); Div. I-AA First-team All-American (1995)

Earl L. Holmes (born April 28, 1973) is an American former professional football linebacker and former head coach at Florida A&M University. He was selected by the Pittsburgh Steelers in the fourth round of the 1996 NFL draft out of Florida A&M University. Holmes was inducted into the FAMU Hall of Fame in July 2005 to join the likes of Alonzo S. "Jake" Gaither and FAMU'S "Famed Final Four of 1952."

== Playing career ==
Holmes, Florida A&M- Holmes played for the Rattlers from 1992 to 1995, finishing as the school's all-time leader in tackles. Holmes, a three-time All-MEAC First-team selection, holds the school and MEAC record with 509 total tackles (309 solo). During his senior season, he set school marks for solo tackles (103) and total tackles (171).Holmes had a single game career high against Southern University in the Atlanta Classic where he tallied (30) tackles. He captured the NCAA Division I-AA and Black College All-American honors in 1994 and 1995. The 1995 MEAC Defensive Player of the Year and Sheridan Broadcasting Network College Defensive Player of the Year, Holmes was selected in the fourth round of the 1996 National Football League (NFL) draft by the Pittsburgh Steelers.

In his NFL career, Holmes played for the Steelers, Cleveland Browns, and Detroit Lions. Holmes, listed at 6'2' 242 lbs, garnered a reputation as a solid run stopping Middle Linebacker. He played his first 6 seasons in Pittsburgh where he totaled 547 tackles (392 solo), 9.5 sacks, an unhealthy 56 tackles for loss, 3 forced fumbles, 4 fumbles recovered, 21 pass deflections, and 1 interception for 36 yards in 81 games. In 2002 Holmes signed a free agent deal with the Cleveland Browns. He had one of his best seasons of his career by totaling 128 tackles (96 solo), 8.5 tackles for loss, 1 forced fumble, 1 fumble recovery, and 5 pass deflections in leading the Browns to a playoff berth. Holmes finished his career with three solid seasons for the Detroit Lions. He played 10 seasons in the NFL as a member of the Steelers (1996–2001), Cleveland Browns (2002) and Detroit Lions (2003–05) before retiring.

In his 10-year career he totaled 958 tackles (685 solos), 11.5 sacks, 89 tackles for loss, 6 forced fumbles, 5 fumble recoveries, 29 pass deflections, and 1 interception for 36 yards in 140 games.

Holmes was affectionally known as "The Hit Man" by the Steelers' faithful.

== Coaching career ==
In 2009, he returned to Florida A&M to serve on the coaching staff of Joe Taylor, eventually rising to defensive coordinator in 2012. Just before the end of the season, Taylor retired, and Holmes was named as interim head coach. On January 11, 2013, he was officially named the head coach and interim tag was removed.

He was relieved of his duties as head coach on October 28, 2014.

== Head coaching record ==
Year	Team	Overall	Conference	Standing	Bowl/playoffs
Florida A&M Rattlers (Mid-Eastern Athletic Conference) (2012–2014)
2012	Florida A&M	1–1	1–1	T–6th	
2013	Florida A&M	3–9	2–6	10th	
2014	Florida A&M	2–6	2–2		
Florida A&M:		6–16	5–9		
Total:		6–16			
