= 2012 Gardner–Webb Runnin' Bulldogs football team =

American college football season

2012 Gardner–Webb Runnin' Bulldogs football
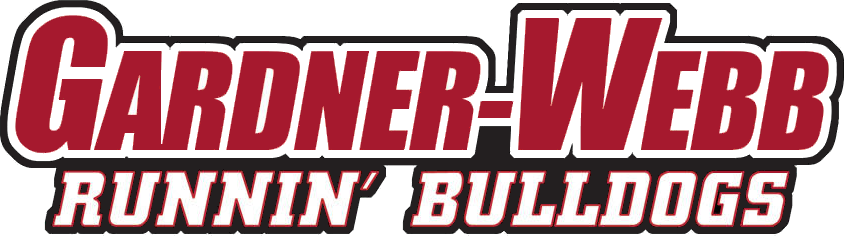
- Conference: Big South Conference
- Record: 3–8 (2–4 Big South)
- Head coach: Ron Dickerson Jr. (2nd season)
- Defensive coordinator: Tony Pierce (2nd season)
- Home stadium: Ernest W. Spangler Stadium

2012 Big South Conference football standings
	Conf.			Overall
Team	W		L	W		L
No. 10 Stony Brook +^	5	–	1	10	–	3
Coastal Carolina +^	5	–	1	8	–	5
Liberty +	5	–	1	6	–	5
Charleston Southern	3	–	3	5	–	6
Gardner–Webb	2	–	4	3	–	8
VMI	1	–	5	2	–	9
Presbyterian	0	–	6	2	–	9
$ – Conference champion; ^ – FCS playoff participant; Rankings from The Sports Network poll

The 2012 Gardner–Webb Runnin' Bulldogs football team represented Gardner–Webb University as a member of the Big South Conference during the 2012 NCAA Division I FCS football season. Led by Ron Dickerson Jr. in his second and final season as head coach, the Runnin' Bulldogs compiled an overall record of 3–8 with a mark of 2–4 in conference play, placing fifth in the Big South. Gardner–Webb played home games at Ernest W. Spangler Stadium in Boiling Springs, North Carolina.

== Schedule ==
Date	Time	Opponent	Site	TV	Result	Attendance
September 1	6:00 pm	No. 10 Wofford*	Ernest W. Spangler Stadium; Boiling Springs, NC		L 7–34	3,140
September 8	6:00 pm	at Richmond*	E. Claiborne Robins Stadium; Richmond, VA		L 8–41	8,700
September 15	3:00 pm	Samford*	Ernest W. Spangler Stadium; Boiling Springs, NC		L 23–44	3,850
September 22	3:30 pm	at Pittsburgh*	Heinz Field; Pittsburgh, PA	ESPN3	L 10–55	36,452
October 6	3:30 pm	at Liberty	Williams Stadium; Lynchburg, VA	ESPN3	L 35–42	18,239
October 13	6:00 pm	MidAmerica Nazarene*	Ernest W. Spangler Stadium; Boiling Springs, NC		W 30–28	3,650
October 20	4:00 pm	at No. 10 Stony Brook	Kenneth P. LaValle Stadium; Stony Brook, NY		L 10–41	5,791
October 27	1:30 pm	VMI	Ernest W. Spangler Stadium; Boiling Springs, NC		W 38–7	5,620
November 3	1:30 pm	Coastal Carolina	Ernest W. Spangler Stadium; Boiling Springs, NC	ESPN3	L 33–55	3,590
November 10	1:30 pm	at Charleston Southern	Buccaneer Field; Charleston, SC	ESPN3	L 10–28	2,125
November 17	1:30 pm	Presbyterian	Ernest W. Spangler Stadium; Boiling Springs, NC		W 21–15	1,790
*Non-conference game; Rankings from The Sports Network Poll released prior to the game; All times are in Eastern time
