= 2012 Bethune–Cookman Wildcats football team =

American college football season

2012 Bethune-Cookman Wildcats football

MEAC champion

FCS Playoffs First Round, L 14–24 vs. Coastal Carolina
- Conference: Mid-Eastern Athletic Conference

Ranking
- Sports Network: No. 22
- FCS Coaches: No. 22
- Record: 9–3 (8–0 MEAC)
- Head coach: Brian Jenkins (3rd season)
- Offensive coordinator: Jim Pry (1st season)
- Defensive coordinator: Charles Jones (3rd season)
- Home stadium: Municipal Stadium

2012 Mid-Eastern Athletic Conference football standings
	Conf.			Overall
Team	W		L	W		L
No. 22 Bethune–Cookman $^	8	–	0	9	–	3
Howard	6	–	2	7	–	4
North Carolina A&T	5	–	3	7	–	4
North Carolina Central	5	–	3	6	–	5
Delaware State	5	–	3	6	–	5
South Carolina State	4	–	4	5	–	6
Florida A&M	4	–	4	4	–	7
Hampton	3	–	5	3	–	7
Norfolk State	2	–	6	4	–	7
Morgan State	2	–	6	3	–	8
Savannah State	0	–	8	1	–	10
$ – Conference champion; ^ – FCS playoff participant; Rankings from The Sports Network poll

The 2012 Bethune–Cookman Wildcats football team represented Bethune-Cookman University in the 2012 NCAA Division I FCS football season. They were led by third-year head coach Brian Jenkins and played their home games at Municipal Stadium. They are a member of the Mid-Eastern Athletic Conference (MEAC). They finished the season 9–3, 8–0 in MEAC play to win the conference title. They earned the MEAC's automatic bid into the FCS playoffs where they lost in the first round to Coastal Carolina.

== Schedule ==
Date	Time	Opponent	Rank	Site	TV	Result	Attendance
September 2	12:00 pm	vs. Alabama State*		Florida Citrus Bowl; Orlando, FL (MEAC/SWAC Challenge)	ESPN	W 38–28	17,410
September 8	6:00 pm	at South Carolina State		Oliver C. Dawson Stadium; Orangeburg, SC		W 27–14	15,491
September 15	12:00 pm	at Miami (FL)*		Sun Life Stadium; Miami Gardens, FL		L 10–38	39,435
September 22	4:00 pm	Tennessee State*		Municipal Stadium; Daytona Beach, FL		L 14–21	9,461
September 29	6:00 pm	at Hampton		Armstrong Stadium; Hampton, VA		W 38–26	1,200
October 6	4:00 pm	North Carolina A&T^{†}		Municipal Stadium; Daytona Beach, FL		W 28–12	10,181
October 20	4:00 pm	Norfolk State		Municipal Stadium; Daytona Beach, FL		W 48–3	6,253
October 27	4:00 pm	North Carolina Central		Municipal Stadium; Daytona Beach, FL		W 42–17	5,738
November 3	1:00 pm	at Morgan State		Hughes Stadium; Baltimore, MD		W 24–13	2,187
November 10	5:00 pm	at Savannah State		Ted Wright Stadium; Savannah, GA		W 49–7	3,683
November 17	2:00 pm	vs. Florida A&M	No. 25	Florida Citrus Bowl; Orlando, FL (Florida Classic)	ESPNC	W 21–16	32,317
November 24	2:00 pm	Coastal Carolina*	No. 22	Municipal Stadium; Daytona Beach, FL (NCAA Division I First Round)	ESPN3	L 14–24	5,465
*Non-conference game; ^{†}Homecoming; Rankings from The Sports Network Poll released prior to the game; All times are in Eastern time
