= 2012 Coastal Carolina Chanticleers football team =

American college football season

2012 Coastal Carolina Chanticleers football

Big South co-champion

NCAA Division I Second Round, L 35–63 at Old Dominion
- Conference: Big South Conference

Ranking
- Sports Network: No. 24
- FCS Coaches: No. 24
- Record: 8–5 (5–1 Big South)
- Head coach: Joe Moglia (1st season)
- Offensive coordinator: Dave Patenaude (1st season)
- Offensive scheme: Pro spread
- Defensive coordinator: Clayton Carlin (1st season)
- Base defense: 4–2–5
- Home stadium: Brooks Stadium

2012 Big South Conference football standings
	Conf.			Overall
Team	W		L	W		L
No. 10 Stony Brook +^	5	–	1	10	–	3
Coastal Carolina +^	5	–	1	8	–	5
Liberty +	5	–	1	6	–	5
Charleston Southern	3	–	3	5	–	6
Gardner–Webb	2	–	4	3	–	8
VMI	1	–	5	2	–	9
Presbyterian	0	–	6	2	–	9
$ – Conference champion; ^ – FCS playoff participant; Rankings from The Sports Network poll

The 2012 Coastal Carolina Chanticleers football team represented Coastal Carolina University as a member of the Big South Conference during the 2012 NCAA Division I FCS football season. Led by first-year head coach Joe Moglia, the Chanticleers compiled an overall record of 8–5 with a mark of 5–1 in conference play, sharing the Big South title with Liberty and Stony Brook. Coastal Carolina received the Big South's automatic bid into the NCAA Division I Football Championship playoffs, where the Chanticleers defeated Bethune–Cookman in the first round before losing in the second round to Old Dominion. Coastal Carolina played home games at Brooks Stadium in Conway, South Carolina.

== Schedule ==
Date	Time	Opponent	Site	TV	Result	Attendance
September 1	6:00 pm	North Carolina A&T*	Brooks Stadium; Conway, SC		W 29–13	9,314
September 8	5:00 pm	at Furman*	Paladin Stadium; Greenville, SC		W 47–45 ^{3OT}	7,156
September 15	6:00 pm	No. 20 Eastern Kentucky*	Brooks Stadium; Conway, SC		L 17–35	9,316
September 22	7:00 pm	at Toledo*	Glass Bowl; Toledo, OH	ESPN3	L 28–38	19,023
September 29	3:30 pm	at No. 17 Appalachian State*	Kidd Brewer Stadium; Boone, NC		L 14–55	27,619
October 13	3:30 pm	No. 11 Stony Brook	Brooks Stadium; Conway, SC	ESPN3	L 21–27	7,749
October 20	1:30 pm	at VMI	Alumni Memorial Field; Lexington, VA	ESPN3	W 34–7	7,281
October 27	3:30 pm	Liberty^{†}	Brooks Stadium; Conway, SC (rivalry)	Flames Sports Network	W 36–12	6,732
November 3	1:30 pm	at Gardner–Webb	Ernest W. Spangler Stadium; Boiling Springs, NC	ESPN3	W 55–33	3,590
November 10	1:00 pm	at Presbyterian	Bailey Memorial Stadium; Clinton, SC		W 65–7	4,381
November 17	3:30 pm	Charleston Southern	Brooks Stadium; Conway, SC	MASN	W 41–20	7,037
November 24	2:00 pm	at No. 22 Bethune-Cookman*	Municipal Stadium; Daytona Beach, FL (NCAA Division I First Round)	ESPN3	W 24–14	5,465
December 1	2:00 pm	at No. 3 Old Dominion*	Foreman Field; Norfolk, VA (NCAA Division I Second Round)	ESPN3	L 35–63	20,068
*Non-conference game; ^{†}Homecoming; Rankings from The Sports Network Poll released prior to the game; All times are in Eastern time
