= 2012 South Carolina State Bulldogs football team =

American college football season

2012 South Carolina State Bulldogs football
- Conference: Mid-Eastern Athletic Conference
- Record: 5–6 (4–4 MEAC)
- Head coach: Oliver Pough (11th season)
- Defensive coordinator: Mike Adams
- Home stadium: Oliver C. Dawson Stadium

2012 Mid-Eastern Athletic Conference football standings
	Conf.			Overall
Team	W		L	W		L
No. 22 Bethune–Cookman $^	8	–	0	9	–	3
Howard	6	–	2	7	–	4
North Carolina A&T	5	–	3	7	–	4
North Carolina Central	5	–	3	6	–	5
Delaware State	5	–	3	6	–	5
South Carolina State	4	–	4	5	–	6
Florida A&M	4	–	4	4	–	7
Hampton	3	–	5	3	–	7
Norfolk State	2	–	6	4	–	7
Morgan State	2	–	6	3	–	8
Savannah State	0	–	8	1	–	10
$ – Conference champion; ^ – FCS playoff participant; Rankings from The Sports Network poll

The 2012 South Carolina State Bulldogs football team represented South Carolina State University in the 2012 NCAA Division I FCS football season. They were led by 11th year head coach Oliver Pough and played their home games at Oliver C. Dawson Stadium. They are a member of the Mid-Eastern Athletic Conference. They finished the season 5–6, 4–4 in MEAC play to finish in a tie for sixth place.

== Schedule ==
Date	Time	Opponent	Site	TV	Result	Attendance
August 30	7:30 pm	at Georgia State*	Georgia Dome; Atlanta, GA		W 33–6	18,921
September 8	6:00 pm	Bethune-Cookman	Oliver C. Dawson Stadium; Orangeburg, SC		L 14–27	15,491
September 15	10:30 pm	at No. 24 (FBS) Arizona*	Arizona Stadium; Tucson, AZ	P12N	L 0–56	43,919
September 22	7:00 pm	at Texas A&M*	Kyle Field; College Station, TX	SECRN	L 14–70	86,775
September 29	2:00 pm	Norfolk State	Oliver C. Dawson Stadium; Orangeburg, SC		W 14–0	20,025
October 6	2:30 pm	vs. North Carolina Central	Lucas Oil Stadium; Indianapolis, IN (Circle City Classic)		L 10–40	18,000
October 13	1:30 pm	at Delaware State	Alumni Stadium; Dover, DE		L 17–31	3,794
October 20	6:00 pm	at Florida A&M	Bragg Memorial Stadium; Tallahassee, FL		W 27–20 ^{OT}	11,106
October 27	1:30 pm	Howard^{†}	Oliver C. Dawson Stadium; Orangeburg, SC		W 41–23	19,187
November 10	1:30 pm	at North Carolina A&T	Aggie Stadium; Greensboro, NC		L 7–17	10,432
November 17	1:30 pm	Savannah State	Oliver C. Dawson Stadium; Orangeburg, SC		W 27–13	10,011
*Non-conference game; ^{†}Homecoming; Rankings from The Sports Network Poll released prior to the game; All times are in Eastern time

- Source: Schedule
