= 2012 Charleston Southern Buccaneers football team =

American college football season

2012 Charleston Southern Buccaneers football
- Conference: Big South Conference
- Record: 5–6 (3–3 Big South)
- Head coach: Jay Mills (10th season)
- Offensive coordinator: Patrick Nix (2nd season)
- Defensive coordinator: Shawn Quinn (1st season)
- Home stadium: Buccaneer Field

2012 Big South Conference football standings
	Conf.			Overall
Team	W		L	W		L
No. 10 Stony Brook +^	5	–	1	10	–	3
Coastal Carolina +^	5	–	1	8	–	5
Liberty +	5	–	1	6	–	5
Charleston Southern	3	–	3	5	–	6
Gardner–Webb	2	–	4	3	–	8
VMI	1	–	5	2	–	9
Presbyterian	0	–	6	2	–	9
$ – Conference champion; ^ – FCS playoff participant; Rankings from The Sports Network poll

The 2012 Charleston Southern Buccaneers football team represented Charleston Southern University as a member of the Big South Conference during the 2012 NCAA Division I FCS football season. Led by Jay Mills in his tenth and final season as head coach, the Buccaneers compiled an overall record of 5–6 with a mark of 3–3 in conference play, placing fourth in the Big South. Charleston Southern played home games at Buccaneer Field in Charleston, South Carolina.

== Schedule ==
Date	Time	Opponent	Site	TV	Result	Attendance
September 1	6:00 pm	at The Citadel*	Johnson Hagood Stadium; Charleston, SC		L 14–49	14,264
September 8	1:30 pm	Jacksonville*	Buccaneer Field; Charleston, SC		L 10–31	2,136
September 15	12:00 pm	at Illinois*	Memorial Stadium; Champaign, IL	BTN	L 0–44	45,369
September 22	1:30 pm	at Shorter*	Barron Stadium; Rome, GA		W 23–20	3,500
October 6	6:00 pm	at No. 13 Stony Brook	Kenneth P. LaValle Stadium; Stony Brook, NY		L 7–49	5,100
October 13	1:30 pm	VMI	Buccaneer Field; Charleston, SC		W 32–14	2,191
October 20	1:30 pm	Presbyterian	Buccaneer Field; Charleston, SC	ESPN3	W 31–21	3,413
October 27	1:30 pm	Edward Waters*	Buccaneer Field; Charleston, SC		W 42–7	1,611
November 3	3:30 pm	at Liberty	Williams Stadium; Lynchburg, VA	Flames Sports Network	L 12–26	13,644
November 10	1:30 pm	Gardner–Webb	Buccaneer Field; Charleston, SC	ESPN3	W 28–10	2,125
November 17	3:30 pm	at Coastal Carolina	Brooks Stadium; Conway, SC	MASN	L 20–41	7,037
*Non-conference game; Rankings from The Sports Network Poll released prior to the game; All times are in Eastern time
