= 2012 North Carolina Central Eagles football team =

American college football season

2012 North Carolina Central Eagles football
- Conference: Mid-Eastern Athletic Conference
- Record: 6–5 (5–3 MEAC)
- Head coach: Henry Frazier III (2nd season)
- Offensive coordinator: Michael Bryant (2nd season)
- Defensive coordinator: John Morgan Jr. (2nd season)
- Home stadium: O'Kelly–Riddick Stadium

2012 Mid-Eastern Athletic Conference football standings
	Conf.			Overall
Team	W		L	W		L
No. 22 Bethune–Cookman $^	8	–	0	9	–	3
Howard	6	–	2	7	–	4
North Carolina A&T	5	–	3	7	–	4
North Carolina Central	5	–	3	6	–	5
Delaware State	5	–	3	6	–	5
South Carolina State	4	–	4	5	–	6
Florida A&M	4	–	4	4	–	7
Hampton	3	–	5	3	–	7
Norfolk State	2	–	6	4	–	7
Morgan State	2	–	6	3	–	8
Savannah State	0	–	8	1	–	10
$ – Conference champion; ^ – FCS playoff participant; Rankings from The Sports Network poll

The 2012 North Carolina Central Eagles football team represented North Carolina Central University as a member of the Mid-Eastern Athletic Conference (MEAC) during the 2012 NCAA Division I FCS football season. Led by second-year head coach Henry Frazier III, the Eagles compiled an overall record of 6–5 with a mark of 5–3, placing in a three-way tie for third in the MEAC. North Carolina Central played home games at O'Kelly–Riddick Stadium in Durham, North Carolina.

== Schedule ==
Date	Time	Opponent	Site	TV	Result	Attendance
September 1	6:00 pm	Fayetteville State*	O'Kelly–Riddick Stadium; Durham, NC	EV	W 54–31	9,077
September 8	7:00 pm	at Elon*	Rhodes Stadium; Elon, NC		L 14–34	7,528
September 15	7:00 pm	at Duke*	Wallace Wade Stadium; Durham, NC (Bull City Gridiron Classic)	ESPN3	L 17–54	22,829
September 22	7:00 pm	at Savannah State	Ted Wright Stadium; Savannah, GA		W 45–33	3,415
October 6	2:30 pm	vs. South Carolina State	Lucas Oil Stadium; Indianapolis, IN (Circle City Classic)		W 40–10	18,000
October 13	1:00 pm	at Morgan State	Hughes Stadium; Baltimore, MD		W 24–20	10,324
October 18	7:30 pm	Hampton	O'Kelly–Riddick Stadium; Durham, NC	ESPNU	W 37–20	9,648
October 27	4:00 pm	at Bethune-Cookman	Municipal Stadium; Daytona Beach, FL		L 17–42	5,738
November 3	2:00 pm	Delaware State	O'Kelly–Riddick Stadium; Durham, NC	EV	W 23–20 ^{OT}	12,742
November 10	3:00 pm	at Florida A&M	Bragg Memorial Stadium; Tallahassee, FL		L 21–22	14,768
November 17	2:00 pm	North Carolina A&T	O'Kelly–Riddick Stadium; Durham, NC (rivalry)	EV	L 16–22 ^{OT}	11,184
*Non-conference game; All times are in Eastern time
