= 2012 Liberty Flames football team =

American college football season

2012 Liberty Flames football
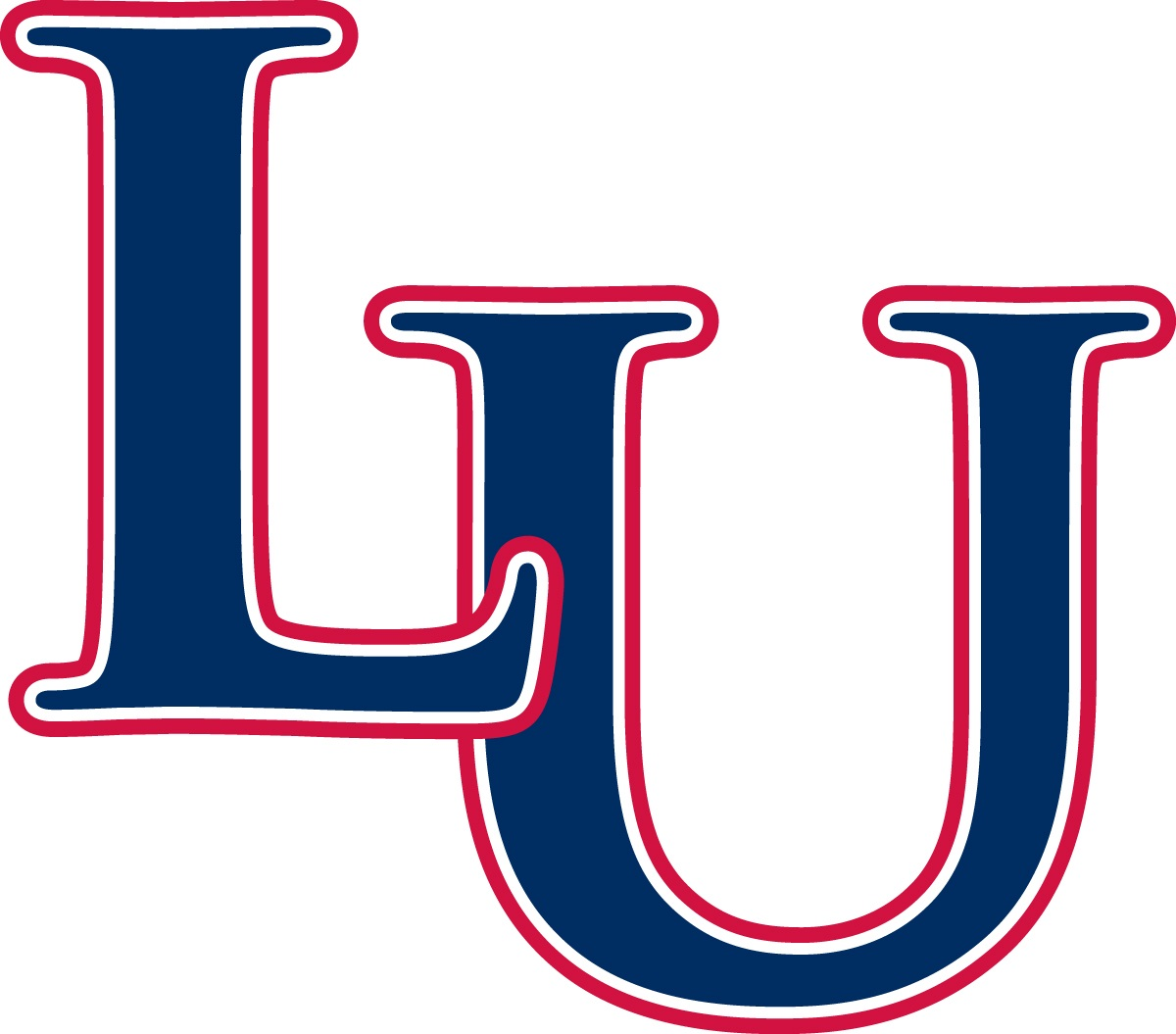

Big South co-champion
- Conference: Big South Conference
- Record: 6–5 (5–1 Big South)
- Head coach: Turner Gill (1st season)
- Offensive coordinator: Aaron Stamn (1st season)
- Co-offensive coordinator: Dennis Wagner (1st season)
- Offensive scheme: Spread
- Co-defensive coordinators: Robert Wimberly (1st season); Vantz Singletary (1st season)
- Base defense: 4–3
- Home stadium: Williams Stadium

2012 Big South Conference football standings
| | Conf. | | | Overall |
| Team | W | | L | W | | L |
|---|---|---|---|---|---|---|
| No. 10 Stony Brook +^ | 5 | – | 1 | 10 | – | 3 |
| Coastal Carolina +^ | 5 | – | 1 | 8 | – | 5 |
| Liberty + | 5 | – | 1 | 6 | – | 5 |
| Charleston Southern | 3 | – | 3 | 5 | – | 6 |
| Gardner–Webb | 2 | – | 4 | 3 | – | 8 |
| VMI | 1 | – | 5 | 2 | – | 9 |
| Presbyterian | 0 | – | 6 | 2 | – | 9 |
$ – Conference champion; ^ – FCS playoff participant; Rankings from The Sports Network poll

The 2012 Liberty Flames football team represented Liberty University in the 2012 NCAA Division I FCS football season. They were led by first-year head coach Turner Gill and played their home games at Williams Stadium. They were a member of the Big South Conference. They finished the season 6–5, 5–1 in Big South play to claim a share of the Big South Conference championship with Coastal Carolina and Stony Brook. Despite the conference title, the Flames were not invited to the FCS playoffs.

== Schedule ==
| Date | Time | Opponent | Site | TV | Result | Attendance |
|---|---|---|---|---|---|---|
| September 1 | 6:30 pm | at Wake Forest* | BB&T Field; Winston-Salem, NC | ESPN3 | L 17–20 | 27,652 |
| September 8 | 7:00 pm | Norfolk State* | Williams Stadium; Lynchburg, VA | Flames Sports Network/MASN2 | L 24–31 | 15,826 |
| September 15 | 3:00 pm | at No. 14 Montana* | Washington–Grizzly Stadium; Missoula, MT | Flames Sports Network/ALT/MASN | L 14–34 | 24,991 |
| September 22 | 7:00 pm | No. 16 Lehigh* | Williams Stadium; Lynchburg, VA | Flames Sports Network/MASN (JIP) | L 26–28 | 17,139 |
| October 6 | 3:30 pm | Gardner–Webb | Williams Stadium; Lynchburg, VA | Flames Sports Network/MASN | W 42–35 | 18,239 |
| October 13 | 2:00 pm | at Presbyterian | Bailey Memorial Stadium; Clinton, SC | Flames Sports Network/MASN2 | W 56–7 | 5,335 |
| October 20 | 3:30 pm | Concord* | Williams Stadium; Lynchburg, VA | Flames Sports Network/MASN2 | W 21–13 | 18,643 |
| October 27 | 3:30 pm | at Coastal Carolina | Brooks Stadium; Conway, SC (rivalry) | Flames Sports Network/MASN2 | L 12–36 | 6,732 |
| November 3 | 3:30 pm | Charleston Southern | Williams Stadium; Lynchburg, VA | Flames Sports Network/MASN2 | W 26–12 | 13,644 |
| November 10 | 3:30 pm | No. 6 Stony Brook | Williams Stadium; Lynchburg, VA | MASN; ESPN3 | W 28–14 | 14,419 |
| November 17 | 1:30 pm | at VMI | Alumni Memorial Field; Lexington, VA | ESPN3 | W 33–14 | 5,202 |
*Non-conference game; Rankings from The Sports Network Poll released prior to the game; All times are in Eastern time

- Source: Schedule
