= 2012 All-America college football team =

Official list of the best college football players of 2012

The 2012 All-America college football team includes those players of American college football who have been honored by various selector organizations as the best players at their respective positions. The selector organizations award the "All-America" honor annually following the conclusion of the fall college football season. The original All-America team was the 1889 All-America college football team selected by Caspar Whitney and Walter Camp. In 1950, the National Collegiate Athletic Bureau, which is the National Collegiate Athletic Association's (NCAA) service bureau, compiled the first list of All-Americans including first-team selections on teams created for a national audience that received national circulation with the intent of recognizing selections made from viewpoints that were nationwide. Since 1952, College Sports Information Directors of America (CoSIDA) has bestowed Academic All-American recognition on male and female athletes in Divisions I, II, and III of the NCAA as well as National Association of Intercollegiate Athletics athletes, covering all NCAA championship sports.

The 2012 All-America team is composed of the following All-America first teams chosen by the following selector organizations: Associated Press (AP), Football Writers Association of America (FWAA), American Football Coaches Association (AFCA), Walter Camp Foundation (WCFF), The Sporting News (TSN), Sports Illustrated (SI), Pro Football Weekly (PFW), ESPN, CBS Sports (CBS), College Football News (CFN), Scout.com, and Yahoo! Sports (Yahoo!).

Currently, the NCAA compiles consensus all-America teams in the sports of Division I-FBS football and Division I men's basketball using a point system computed from All-America teams named by coaches associations or media sources. The system consists of three points for a first-team honor, two points for second-team honor, and one point for third-team honor. Honorable mention and fourth team or lower recognitions are not accorded any points. Football consensus teams are compiled by position and the player accumulating the most points at each position is named first team consensus all-American. Currently, the NCAA recognizes All-Americans selected by the AP, AFCA, FWAA, TSN, and the WCFF to determine Consensus All-Americans.

In 2012, there were 13 unanimous All-Americans.

Name	Position	Year	School
Ryan Allen	Punter	Senior	Louisiana Tech
Jadeveon Clowney	Defensive Line	Sophomore	South Carolina
Jonathan Cooper	Offensive Line	Senior	North Carolina
Zach Ertz	Tight End	Junior	Stanford
Luke Joeckel	Offensive Line	Junior	Texas A&M
Jarvis Jones	Linebacker	Junior	Georgia
Marqise Lee	Wide Receiver	Sophomore	USC
Dee Milliner	Defensive Back	Junior	Alabama
Manti Te'o	Linebacker	Senior	Notre Dame
Phillip Thomas	Defensive Back	Senior	Fresno State
Chance Warmack	Offensive Line	Senior	Alabama
Björn Werner	Defensive Line	Junior	Florida State
Terrance Williams	Wide Receiver	Senior	Baylor

== Offense ==
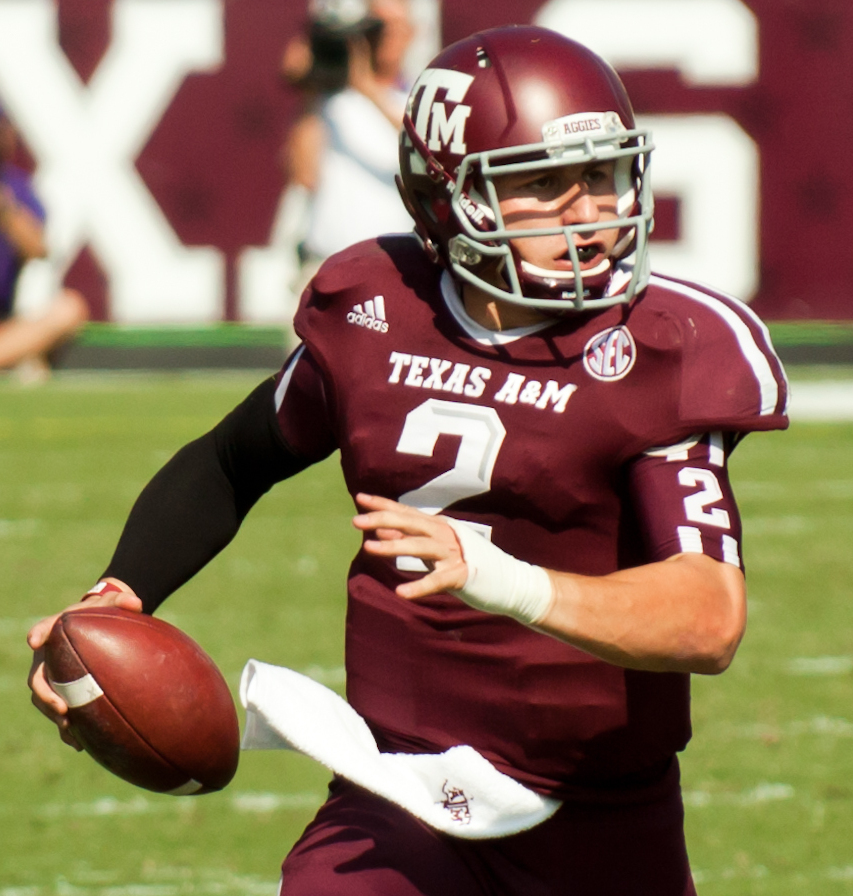
Johnny Manziel of Texas A&M

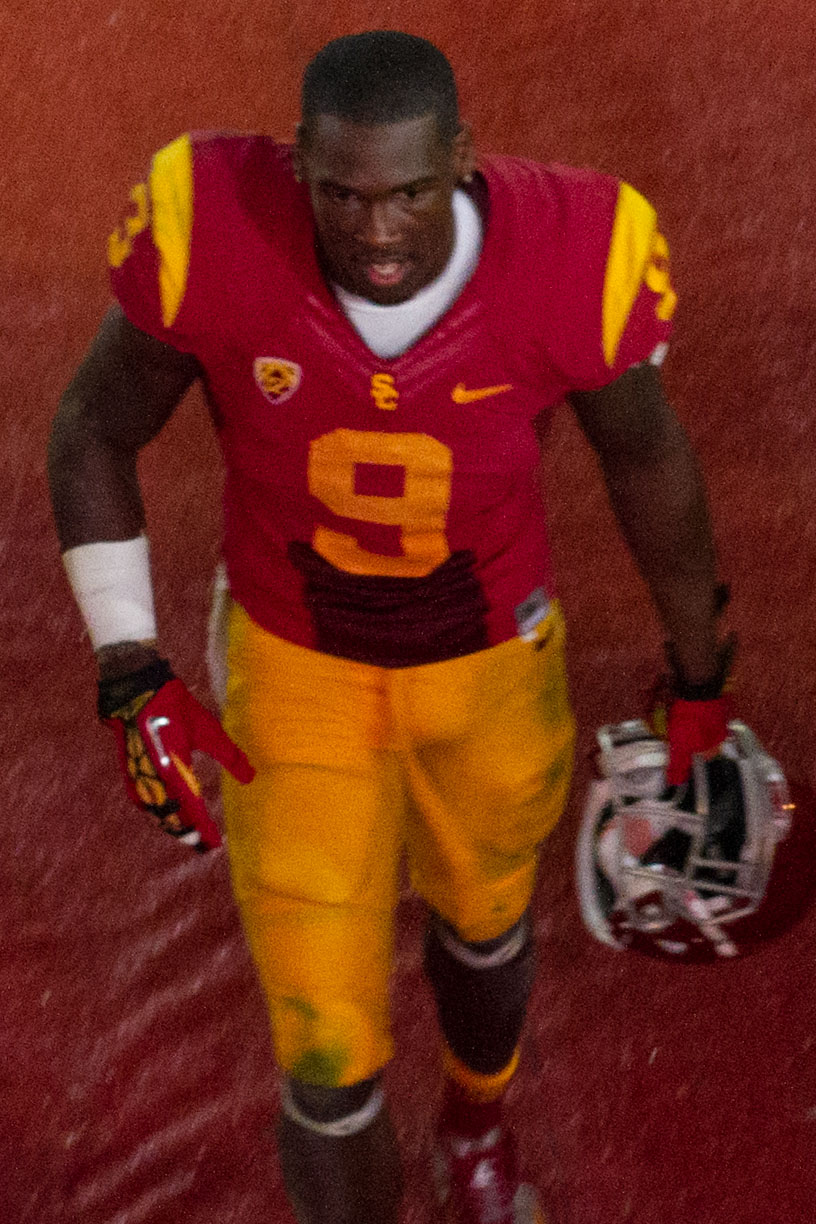
Marqise Lee of USC

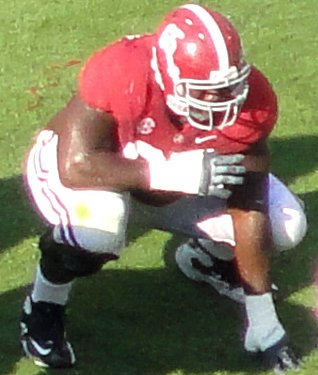
Chance Warmack of Alabama

=== Quarterback ===
- Tajh Boyd, Clemson (AFCA)
- Johnny Manziel, Texas A&M -- CONSENSUS -- (AP-1, FWAA, TSN, WCFF, CBS, ESPN, Scout, SI, CFN)
- Ryan Nassib, Syracuse (PFW)
- Collin Klein, Kansas State (AP-2, WCFF-2, Scout-2)
- Braxton Miller, Ohio State (CFN-2)
- A. J. McCarron, Alabama (AP-3)
- Aaron Murray, Georgia (CFN-3)

=== Running back ===
- Montee Ball, Wisconsin -- CONSENSUS -- (AFCA, AP-1, WCFF, ESPN, PFW, Scout-2, CFN-2)
- Kenjon Barner, Oregon -- CONSENSUS -- (AFCA, FWAA, TSN, WCFF, ESPN, Scout, SI, AP-2, CFN-2)
- Le'Veon Bell, Michigan State (CFN)
- Ka'Deem Carey, Arizona -- CONSENSUS -- (AP-1, TSN, WCFF, CBS, Scout, SI, CFN)
- Johnathan Franklin, UCLA (FWAA, CBS, AP-2, WCFF-2, Scout-2)
- Stefphon Jefferson, Nevada (WCFF-2, AP-3, CFN-3)
- Giovani Bernard, North Carolina (AP-3, CFN-3)

=== Fullback ===
- J. C. Copeland, LSU (PFW)

=== Wide receiver ===
- Stedman Bailey, West Virginia (FWAA, CBS, CFN, AP-2, WCFF-2, Scout-2)
- Marqise Lee, Southern California -- UNANIMOUS -- (AFCA, AP-1, FWAA, TSN, WCFF, CBS, ESPN, PFW, Scout, SI, CFN)
- Sammy Watkins, Clemson (PFW)
- Terrance Williams, Baylor -- UNANIMOUS -- (AFCA, AP-1, FWAA, TSN, WCFF, CBS, ESPN, Scout, SI, CFN-2)
- Quinton Patton, Louisiana Tech (AP-2)
- Tavon Austin, West Virginia (WCFF-2, CFN-3)
- DeAndre Hopkins, Clemson (CFN-2, Scout-2, AP-3)
- Cobi Hamilton, Arkansas (AP-3)
- Davante Adams, Fresno State (CFN-3)

=== Tight end ===
- Tyler Eifert, Notre Dame (PFW, CFN, AP-2, WCFF-2, Scout-2)
- Zach Ertz, Stanford -- UNANIMOUS -- (AFCA, AP-1, TSN, WCFF, CBS, ESPN, Scout, SI, CFN-2)
- Austin Seferian-Jenkins, Washington (AP-3, CFN-3)

=== Offensive line ===
- Jonathan Cooper, North Carolina -- UNANIMOUS -- (AFCA, AP-1, FWAA, TSN, WCFF, CBS, ESPN, PFW, Scout, SI, CFN)
- Eric Fisher, Central Michigan (PFW, AP-3)
- D. J. Fluker, Alabama (CBS, Scout, AP-2, WCFF-2, CFN-2)
- Travis Frederick, Wisconsin (PFW)
- Dalton Freeman, Clemson (AFCA, AP-2, WCFF-2, Scout-2, CFN-3)
- Gabe Ikard, Oklahoma (CFN)
- Luke Joeckel, Texas A&M -- UNANIMOUS -- (AFCA, AP-1, FWAA, TSN, WCFF, CBS, ESPN, PFW, Scout, SI, CFN)
- Barrett Jones, Alabama -- CONSENSUS -- (AP-1, FWAA, TSN, WCFF, CBS, ESPN, Scout, SI, CFN-2)
- Taylor Lewan, Michigan (AP-1, WCFF, ESPN, SI, CFN, Scout-2)
- Jake Matthews, Texas A&M (FWAA, WCFF-2, Scout-2, AP-3, CFN-3)
- Ricky Wagner, Wisconsin (CFN)
- Chance Warmack, Alabama -- UNANIMOUS -- (AFCA, AP-1, FWAA, TSN, WCFF, CBS, ESPN, PFW, Scout, SI)
- David Yankey, Stanford -- CONSENSUS -- (AFCA, TSN, AP-2)
- Spencer Long, Nebraska (AP-2, WCFF-2)
- Cyril Richardson, Baylor (AP-2, CFN-3)
- Justin Pugh, Syracuse (CFN-2)
- Lane Taylor, Oklahoma State (CFN-2)
- Tyler Larsen, Utah State (CFN-2)
- Zack Martin, Notre Dame (WCFF-2)
- Gabe Jackson, Mississippi State (Scout-2)
- Larry Warford, Kentucky (AP-3)
- Xavier Suʻa-Filo, UCLA (Scout-2, AP-3)
- Braxston Cave, Notre Dame (AP-3)
- Khaled Holmes, USC (CFN-3)
- Cyrus Kouandjio, Alabama (CFN-3)

== Defense ==
=== Defensive line ===
- Jadeveon Clowney, South Carolina -- UNANIMOUS -- (AFCA, AP-1, FWAA, TSN, WCFF, CBS, ESPN, PFW, Scout, SI, CFN)
- Sharrif Floyd, Florida (TSN, AP-3)
- Johnathan Hankins, Ohio State (Scout, AP-2)
- Chris Jones, Bowling Green (FWAA, AP-3)
- Bennie Logan, LSU (PFW)
- Star Lotulelei, Utah (AP-1, WCFF, Scout)
- Damontre Moore, Texas A&M -- CONSENSUS -- (AFCA, FWAA, WCFF, ESPN, CFN, AP-2, Scout-2)
- Will Sutton, Arizona State -- CONSENSUS -- (AFCA, AP-1, TSN, CBS, SI, CFN, WCFF-2, Scout-2)
- Stephon Tuitt, Notre Dame (CBS, ESPN, SI, AP-2, WCFF-2, CFN-2)
- Björn Werner, Florida State -- UNANIMOUS -- (AFCA, AP-1, FWAA, TSN, WCFF, CBS, PFW, Scout)
- Jesse Williams, Alabama (CFN)
- Sylvester Williams, North Carolina (PFW)
- Kawann Short, Purdue (AP-2)
- John Simon, Ohio State (WCFF-2, Scout-2, CFN-2, AP-3)
- Alex Okafor, Texas (CFN-2)
- Jamie Collins, Southern Miss (CFN-2)
- Sam Montgomery, LSU (WCFF-2, AP-3, CFN-3)
- John Jenkins, Georgia (Scout-2, CFN-3)
- Quanterus Smith, Western Kentucky (CFN-3)
- Devonte Fields, TCU (CFN-3)

=== Linebacker ===
- Arthur Brown, Kansas State (FWAA, AP-2, WCFF-2, Scout-2)
- Khaseem Greene, Rutgers (ESPN, CFN, WCFF-2, AP-3)
- Jarvis Jones, Georgia -- UNANIMOUS -- (AFCA, AP-1, FWAA, TSN, WCFF, CBS, ESPN, PFW, Scout, SI, CFN)
- Dion Jordan, Oregon (PFW)
- Michael Mauti, Penn State (ESPN)
- Kevin Minter, LSU (SI, AP-2, WCFF-2, Scout-2, CFN-2)
- C. J. Mosley, Alabama -- CONSENSUS -- (AFCA, AP-1, TSN, WCFF, CBS, Scout, SI)
- Manti Te'o, Notre Dame -- UNANIMOUS -- (AFCA, AP-1, FWAA, TSN, WCFF, CBS, ESPN, PFW, Scout, SI, CFN)
- Anthony Barr, UCLA (AP-2, Scout-2)
- Khalil Mack, Buffalo (CFN-2)
- Eric Kendricks, UCLA (CFN-2)
- Trent Murphy, Stanford (AP-3)
- Kyle Van Noy, BYU (AP-3, CFN-3)
- Phillip Steward, Houston (CFN-3)
- DeAundre Brown, Tulsa (CFN-3)

=== Defensive back ===
- Johnthan Banks, Mississippi State (FWAA, WCFF, Scout, AP-2, CFN-3)
- Matt Elam, Florida (AP-1, TSN, CBS, Scout, SI, CFN, WCFF-2)
- Tony Jefferson, Oklahoma (PFW, AP-2, Scout-2, CFN-2)
- Dee Milliner, Alabama -- UNANIMOUS -- (AFCA, AP-1, FWAA, TSN, WCFF, CBS, ESPN, PFW, Scout, CFN)
- Jordan Poyer, Oregon State -- CONSENSUS -- (AFCA, AP-1, TSN, WCFF, CBS, SI, CFN-3)
- Eric Reid, LSU -- CONSENSUS -- (AFCA, FWAA, ESPN, Scout, AP-2, WCFF-2, CFN-2)
- Bradley Roby, Ohio State (ESPN, AP-2, WCFF-2)
- Logan Ryan, Rutgers (PFW, CFN-2)
- Phillip Thomas, Fresno State -- UNANIMOUS -- (AFCA, AP-1, FWAA, TSN, WCFF, CBS, ESPN, SI, CFN, Scout-2)
- Kenny Vaccaro, Texas (PFW, CFN-2)
- Jason Verrett, TCU (SI, CFN, WCFF-2, AP-3)
- Xavier Rhodes, Florida State (Scout-2, CFN-3)
- Desmond Trufant, Washington (Scout-2)
- Ifo Ekpre-Olomu, Oregon (AP-3)
- Ed Reynolds, Stanford (AP-3)
- Ty Zimmerman, Kansas State (AP-3)
- Dexter McCoil, Tulsa (CFN-3)

== Special teams ==
=== Kicker ===
- Dustin Hopkins, Florida State (WCFF, CBS, Scout, ESPN, PFW, AP-2)
- Cairo Santos, Tulane -- CONSENSUS -- (AP-1, FWAA, SI, CFN, Scout-2)
- Quinn Sharp, Oklahoma State (AFCA, WCFF-2, CFN-2)
- Caleb Sturgis, Florida (TSN, AP-3, CFN-3)

=== Punter ===
- Ryan Allen, Louisiana Tech -- UNANIMOUS -- (AFCA, AP-1, FWAA, TSN, WCFF, CBS, ESPN, PFW, SI, CFN)
- Kyle Christy, Florida (Scout, WCFF-2, CFN-2, AP-3)
- Riley Stephenson, BYU (AP-2)
- Brad Wing, LSU (Scout-2)
- Josh Hubner, Arizona State (CFN-3)

=== All-purpose / return specialist ===
- Dri Archer, Kent State -- CONSENSUS -- (FWAA, TSN, WCFF, ESPN, Scout, AP-3)
- Tavon Austin, West Virginia (AFCA, AP-1, CBS, PFW, Scout, SI)
- Reggie Dunn, Utah (CBS, ESPN, Scout-2)
- Duke Johnson, Miami (CFN, WCFF-2)
- Venric Mark, Northwestern (FWAA, TSN, CBS)
- Quincy McDuffie, UCF (SI, CFN-3)
- Tramaine Thompson, Kansas State (CFN)
- Jordan Lynch, Northern Illinois (AP-2)
- De'Anthony Thomas, Oregon (Scout-2)
- Mike Edwards, Hawaii (CFN-2)
- Ace Sanders, South Carolina (CFN-2)
- Marcus Murphy, Missouri (CFN-3)

== See also ==
- 2012 All-Big 12 Conference football team
- 2012 All-Big Ten Conference football team
- 2012 All-Pac-12 Conference football team
- 2012 All-SEC football team
