= List of Cincinnati Bearcats head football coaches =

The Cincinnati Bearcats football team represents the University of Cincinnati in the Big 12 Conference, competing as part of the National Collegiate Athletic Association (NCAA) Division I Football Bowl Subdivision (FBS). The program has had 39 head coaches and three interim coaches during its existence, as well as one stint with no coach and two periods with the program on hiatus. The Bearcats have been participating in college football since the 1885 season and were one of the first schools currently in the FBS to sponsor a football program. Scott Satterfield is the current head coach, having replaced Luke Fickell (and Kerry Coombs, who took interim charge of the bowl game), after Fickell took the head coaching job at Wisconsin post the 2022 season.

The program's current nickname, "Bearcats", was first used in 1914 and was formally adopted in 1919. Prior to then, common terms like "Varsity" or "Red and Black" (the team's colors) had been used to refer to the football team. The Bearcats have played in more than 1200 games during the program's 129 seasons (through the 2017 regular season). In that time, nine coaches have led the Bearcats in a post-season bowl game, eight have won a conference championship, and four have been inducted into the College Football Hall of Fame.

Rick Minter currently holds several records among Cincinnati coaches, including most games coached (117), seasons coached (10), games won (53), games lost (63), conference wins (23), and conference losses (30). Minter also holds, along with Tuberville and Brian Kelly, the record for most bowl games coached (3). (Note: Mark Dantonio coached the Bearcats for the 2006 regular season before leaving to take the head coach position at Michigan State. Brian Kelly was hired to replace Dantonio and lead Cincinnati in the 2007 International Bowl, to finish out the season.) (Note: Brian Kelly coached Cincinnati through the 2009 regular season and left to take over Notre Dame before the 2010 Sugar Bowl. Assistant coach Jeff Quinn was promoted to interim head coach for the bowl game.) Sid Gillman guided the Bearcats to three Mid-American Conference (MAC) championships, the most of any Cincinnati coach in any conference. Gillman also has the best conference win percentage of any coach (.929); Tom Fennell's .864 is the best regular season percentage, while Kelly's .850 leads among multi-season coaches. Only one interim coach, Steve Stripling, has won a game in that position.

== Key ==
Key to symbols in coaches list
General		Overall		Conference		Postseason (Note: Although the first Rose Bowl Game was played in 1902, it has been continuously played since the 1916 game, and is recognized as the oldest bowl game by the NCAA. "—" indicates any season prior to 1916 when postseason games were not played.)	
No.	Order of coaches (Note: A running total of the number of head coaches, with coaches who served separate tenures being counted only once. Interim head coaches are represented with "Int" and are not counted in the running total. "—" indicates the team played but either without a coach or no coach is on record. "X" indicates an interim year without play.)	GC	Games coached	CW	Conference wins	PW	Postseason wins
DC	Division championships	OW	Overall wins	CL	Conference losses	PL	Postseason losses
CC	Conference championships	OL	Overall losses	CT	Conference ties	PT	Postseason ties
NC	National championships	OT	Overall ties (Note: Overtime rules in college football were introduced in 1996, making ties impossible in the period since.)	C%	Conference winning percentage		
†	Elected to the College Football Hall of Fame	O%	Overall winning percentage (Note: When computing the win–loss percentage, a tie counts as half a win and half a loss.)				

== Coaches ==
List of head football coaches showing season(s) coached, overall records, conference records (Note: From 1885 through 1909, Cincinnati competed as an independent. Between 1910 and 1924, the program was a member of the Ohio Athletic Conference. It then competed in the Buckeye Conference from 1925 through 1935, which was followed by another period of independence. The Bearcats joined the Mid-American Conference in 1946, which they left for the Missouri Valley Conference in 1957. Between 1970 and 1995, Cincinnati again competed as an independent. The Bearcats have competed within conferences since 1996; the first was Conference USA, which they left for the Big East Conference, and then transitioned into the Big East's successor, the American Athletic Conference, starting in 2013. The American Athletic Conference began divisional play in 2015 following the addition of the Navy Midshipmen, which brought the total number of teams in the conference to twelve. Cincinnati had not been a member of a conference division at any time prior to this.), postseason records, championships and selected awards (Note: Statistics correct as of the end of the 2025 NCAA Division I FBS football season.)
No.	Name	Season(s)	GC	OW	OL	OT	O%	CW	CL	CT	C%	PW	PL	PT	DC	CC	NC	Awards
N/A	No coach	1885–93	29	13	12	4	0.517	—	—	—	—	—	—	—	—	—	0	—
1	W. Durant Berry	1894–95	12	6	6	0	0.500	—	—	—	—	—	—	—	—	—	0	—
2	William A. Reynolds	1896	8	4	3	1	0.563	—	—	—	—	—	—	—	—	—	0	—
3	Tom Fennell	1897	11	9	1	1	0.864	—	—	—	—	—	—	—	—	—	0	—
4	Frank Cavanaugh^{†}	1898	9	6	1	2	0.778	—	—	—	—	—	—	—	—	—	0	—
5	Daniel A. Reed	1899–1900	16	8	7	1	0.531	—	—	—	—	—	—	—	—	—	0	—
6	Henry S. Pratt	1901	6	1	4	1	0.250	—	—	—	—	—	—	—	—	—	0	—
7	Anthony Chez	1902–03	17	5	10	2	0.353	—	—	—	—	—	—	—	—	—	0	—
8	Amos Foster	1904–05	16	12	4	0	0.750	—	—	—	—	—	—	—	—	—	0	—
9	William Foley	1906	9	0	7	2	0.111	—	—	—	—	—	—	—	—	—	0	—
X	No team (Note: Cincinnati athletic records state that no football games were played in 1907. However, the College Football Data Warehouse records the Bearcats as having played two games that year, both of which were loses, under the leadership of a "Coach Clancey".)	1907	—	—	—	—	—	—	—	—	—	—	—	—	—	—	—	—
10	Ralph Inott	1908	6	1	4	1	0.250	—	—	—	—	—	—	—	—	—	0	—
11	Robert Burch	1909–11	26	16	8	2	0.654	4	2	1	0.643	—	—	—	—	0	0	—
12	Lowell Dana	1912–13	17	8	7	2	0.529	4	5	2	0.455	—	—	—	—	0	0	—
13	George Little^{†}	1914–15	18	10	8	0	0.556	7	5	0	0.583	—	—	—	—	0	0	—
14	Ion Cortright	1916	9	0	8	1	0.056	0	6	1	0.071	0	0	0	—	0	0	—
15	Frank Marty	1917	6	0	6	0	.000	0	4	0	.000	0	0	0	—	0	0	—
16	Boyd Chambers (Note: The College Football Data Warehouse includes an additional game and win for Chambers in the 1921 season, which is not recorded in Cincinnati's records.)	1918–21	30	12	15	3	0.468	4	9	3	0.344	0	0	0	—	0	0	—
17	George McLaren^{†}	1922–26	45	16	26	3	0.389	8	15	2	0.360	0	0	0	—	0	0	—
18	George Babcock	1927–30	36	12	21	3	0.375	2	15	2	0.158	0	0	0	—	0	0	—
19	Dana M. King	1931–34	36	25	10	1	0.708	9	4	1	0.679	0	0	0	—	2	0	—
20	Russ Cohen (Note: Russ Cohen voluntarily resigned on October 14, 1937, after losing the first four games of the 1937 season. Offensive line coach Wade Woodworth was hired to succeed him, at Cohen's suggestion.)	1935–37	22	8	11	3	0.432	2	2	0	0.500	0	0	0	—	0	0	—
Int	Wade Woodworth	1937	6	0	6	0	.000	—	—	—	—	0	0	0	—	—	0	—
21	Joseph A. Meyer	1938–42	46	27	16	3	0.620	—	—	—	—	0	0	0	—	—	0	—
X	No team (Note: Cincinnati did not field a team during the 1943 or 1944 seasons due to World War II.)	1943–44	—	—	—	—	—	—	—	—	—	—	—	—	—	—	—	—
22	Ray Nolting	1945–48	39	23	15	1	0.603	6	2	0	0.750	1	0	0	—	1	0	—
23	Sid Gillman^{†}	1949–54	64	50	13	1	0.789	13	1	0	0.929	1	1	0	—	3	0	—
24	George Blackburn	1955–60	58	25	27	6	0.483	3	9	3	0.300	0	0	0	—	0	0	—
25	Charles Studley	1961–66	60	27	33	0	0.450	13	9	0	0.591	0	0	0	—	2	0	—
26	Homer Rice	1967–68	19	8	10	1	0.447	5	4	0	0.556	0	0	0	—	0	0	—
27	Ray Callahan	1969–72	43	20	23	0	0.465	2	3	0	0.400	0	0	0	—	0	0	—
28	Tony Mason	1973–76	44	26	18	0	0.591	—	—	—	—	0	0	0	—	—	0	—
29	Ralph Staub	1977–80	44	14	28	2	0.341	—	—	—	—	0	0	0	—	—	0	—
30	Mike Gottfried	1981–82	22	12	10	0	0.545	—	—	—	—	0	0	0	—	—	0	—
31	Watson Brown	1983	11	4	6	1	0.409	—	—	—	—	0	0	0	—	—	0	—
32	Dave Currey	1984–88	55	19	36	0	0.345	—	—	—	—	0	0	0	—	—	0	—
33	Timothy Murphy	1989–93	55	17	37	1	0.318	—	—	—	—	0	0	0	—	—	0	—
34	Rick Minter	1994–2003	117	53	63	1	0.457	23	30	0	0.434	1	2	0	—	1	0	—
35	Mark Dantonio	2004–06	36	18	17	—	0.514	11	11	—	0.500	1	0	—	—	0	0	—
36	Brian Kelly	2006–09	40	34	6	—	0.850	17	4	—	0.810	2	1	—	—	2	0	Home Depot Coach of the Year Award (2009); Big East Coach of the Year (2007, 2008, 2009)
Int	Jeff Quinn	2009	1	0	1	—	.000	—	—	—	—	0	1	—	—	0	0	—
37	Butch Jones (Note: Butch Jones coached the Bearcats through the 2012 regular season before leaving to take the head coach position at Tennessee. Assistant coach Steve Stripling was promoted to interim head coach for the 2012 Belk Bowl.)	2010–12	37	23	14	—	0.622	14	7	—	0.667	1	0	—	—	2	0	Big East Coach of the Year (2011)
Int	Steve Stripling	2012	1	1	0	—	1.000	—	—	—	—	1	0	—	—	0	0	—
38	Tommy Tuberville	2013–16	51	29	22	—	0.569	18	14	—	0.563	0	3	—	0	1	0	—
39	Luke Fickell	2017–2022	75	57	18	—	0.760	35	11	—	0.761	2	2	—	1	2	0	Home Depot Coach of the Year Award (2021); Bobby Dodd Coach of the Year Award (2021); Eddie Robinson Coach of the Year (2021); Sporting News Coach of the Year (2021); AAC Coach of the Year (2018, 2020–2021)
Int	Kerry Coombs	2022	1	0	1	—	.000	—	—	—	—	0	1	—	—	0	0	—
40	Scott Satterfield	2023–present	42	19	22	—	0.452	10	19	—	0.345	0	1	—	—	0	0	—

== Notes ==
Saterfield took over for Fickle. Not tubberville
