= 2012 Belk Bowl =

Cincinnati Bearcats	Duke Blue Devils
(9–3)	(6–6)
Big East	ACC
48	34
Head coach: Steve Stripling (interim)	Head coach: David Cutcliffe
	1	2	3	4	Total
Cincinnati	3	14	10	21	48
Duke	16	0	8	10	34
- Date: December 27, 2012
- Season: 2012
- Stadium: Bank of America Stadium
- Location: Charlotte, North Carolina
- MVP: Brendon Kay (QB, Cincinnati)
- Favorite: Cincinnati by 11
- Referee: Matt Austin (SEC)
- Attendance: 48,128

United States TV coverage
- Network: ESPN
- Announcers: Mike Patrick (Play-by-play); Ed Cunningham (Analyst); Jeannine Edwards (Sideline)

The 2012 Belk Bowl was a post-season American college football bowl game held on December 27, 2012, at Bank of America Stadium in Charlotte, North Carolina in the United States. The eleventh edition of the Belk Bowl began at 6:30 p.m. EST and aired on ESPN. It featured the Big East Conference co-champion Cincinnati Bearcats against the Duke Blue Devils from the Atlantic Coast Conference (ACC), and was the final game of the 2012 NCAA Division I FBS football season for both teams. The Bearcats accepted their invitation after achieving a 9–3 record in the regular season, while the Blue Devils accepted theirs after achieving a 6–6 record. This was the first Belk Bowl for both teams.

== Teams ==
This was the first meeting between these two teams.

=== Cincinnati ===
The Bearcats finished in a four-way tie for the Big East title with a 5–2 conference record (holding the tiebreaker over the Syracuse Orange but behind the Rutgers Scarlet Knights and Louisville Cardinals). After defeating the Connecticut Huskies in their season finale, the Bearcats accepted an invitation to the 2012 Belk Bowl. On Friday, December 7, 2012, Head Coach Butch Jones resigned from the University of Cincinnati to accept the head coaching position at the University of Tennessee. Assistant head coach Steve Stripling coached the Bearcats in the bowl game.

=== Duke ===
The Blue Devils are coming off their best season in almost twenty years; despite finishing fifth in the ACC Coastal Division standings with a 3–5 record, the ACC's lack of bowl-eligible teams enabled the Blue Devils to accept their invitation to the 2012 Belk Bowl.

This will be the Blue Devils' first bowl game since the 1995 Hall of Fame Bowl, in which they lost to the Wisconsin Badgers by a score of 34–20.

== Game summary ==
=== Scoring summary ===
Scoring summary

Quarter	Time	Drive			Team	Scoring information	Score	
Quarter	Time	Plays	Yards	TOP	Team	Scoring information	Cincinnati	Duke
1	11:48	8	79	3:12	Duke	Brandon Connette 5-yard touchdown run, Ross Martin kick blocked	0	6
1	6:12	11	44	3:38	Duke	33-yard field goal by Ross Martin	0	9
1	4:45	3	1	1:27	Duke	Team punt blocked by Tony Foster recovered for a touchdown	0	16
1	1:43	7	50	3:02	Cincy	45-yard field goal by Tony Miliano	3	16
2	4:02	5	54	2:08	Cincy	Anthony McClung 25-yard touchdown reception from Brendon Kay, Tony Miliano kick good	10	16
2	0:42	6	98	1:46	Cincy	Ralph Abernathy 41-yard touchdown reception from Brendon Kay, Tony Miliano kick good	17	16
3	10:02	8	70	4:58	Cincy	27-yard field goal by Tony Miliano	20	16
3	7:41	2	60	0:41	Cincy	George Winn 46-yard touchdown run, Tony Miliano kick good	27	16
3	3:00	11	86	4:41	Duke	Conner Vernon 10-yard touchdown reception from Sean Renfree, 2-point Sean Renfree pass to Isaac Blakeney good	27	24
4	12:45	9	68	3:09	Duke	David Reeves 2-yard touchdown reception from Brandon Connette, Ross Martin kick good	27	31
4	11:19	4	77	1:26	Cincy	Chris Moore 25-yard touchdown reception from Brendon Kay, Tony Miliano kick good	34	31
4	7:24	10	46	3:55	Duke	52-yard field goal by Ross Martin	34	34
4	0:44	4	94	0:48	Cincy	Travis Kelce 83-yard touchdown reception from Brendon Kay, Tony Miliano kick good	41	34
4	0:14	-	-	-	Cincy	Interception returned 55 yards for touchdown by Nick Temple, Tony Miliano kick good	48	34
"TOP" = time of possession. For other American football terms, see Glossary of American football.							Cincinnati	Duke

=== Statistics ===
Statistics	CIN	DUKE
First downs	18	36
Total offense, plays - yards	53–554	89–560
Rushes-yards (net)	28-222	39-200
Passing yards (net)	332	360
Passes, Comp-Att-Int	17-25-0	38-50-2
Time of Possession	26:18	33:42
