= 2012 Duke Blue Devils football team =

American college football season

2012 Duke Blue Devils football

Belk Bowl, L 34–48 vs. Cincinnati
- Conference: Atlantic Coast Conference
- Coastal Division
- Record: 6–7 (3–5 ACC)
- Head coach: David Cutcliffe (5th season)
- Offensive coordinator: Kurt Roper (5th season)
- Offensive scheme: Multiple
- Defensive coordinator: Jim Knowles (3rd season)
- Base defense: 4–2–5
- MVP: Sean Renfree
- Captains: Walt Canty; Ross Cockrell; Sean Renfree; Conner Vernon
- Home stadium: Wallace Wade Stadium

2012 Atlantic Coast Conference football standings
	Conf.			Overall
Team	W		L	W		L
Atlantic Division
No. 10 Florida State xy$	7	–	1	12	–	2
No. 11 Clemson x	7	–	1	11	–	2
NC State	4	–	4	7	–	6
Wake Forest	3	–	5	5	–	7
Maryland	2	–	6	4	–	8
Boston College	1	–	7	2	–	10
Coastal Division
Georgia Tech xy	5	–	3	7	–	7
North Carolina†	5	–	3	8	–	4
Miami (FL)‡	5	–	3	7	–	5
Virginia Tech	4	–	4	7	–	6
Duke	3	–	5	6	–	7
Virginia	2	–	6	4	–	8
Championship: Florida State 21, Georgia Tech 15
$ – BCS representative as conference champion; x – Division champion/co-champions; y – Championship game participant; † North Carolina ineligible for ACC title, championship game, and bowl game due to NCAA sanctions. ‡ Miami ineligible for ACC title, championship game, and bowl game due to self-imposed sanctions.; Rankings from AP Poll

The Duke Blue Devils football team represented Duke University in the 2012 NCAA Division I FBS football season as a member of the Atlantic Coast Conference (ACC) in the Coastal Division.

The Blue Devils were led by fifth-year head coach David Cutcliffe and played their home games at Wallace Wade Stadium They finished the season 6–7 overall and 3–5 in ACC play to place fifth in the Coastal Division. They were invited to the Belk Bowl, the program's first bowl game since 1995, where they were defeated by Cincinnati.

Quarterback Sean Renfree was drafted after the season in the 7th round of the 2013 NFL draft by the Atlanta Falcons.

== Schedule ==
Date	Time	Opponent	Site	TV	Result	Attendance
September 1	7:00 pm	FIU*	Wallace Wade Stadium; Durham, NC	ESPN3	W 46–26	31,117
September 8	10:30 pm	at No. 21 Stanford*	Stanford Stadium; Stanford, CA	P12N	L 13–50	44,016
September 15	7:00 pm	North Carolina Central*	Wallace Wade Stadium; Durham, NC (Bull City Gridiron Classic)	ESPN3	W 54–17	22,829
September 22	6:00 pm	Memphis*^{†}	Wallace Wade Stadium; Durham, NC	ESPN3	W 38–14	23,658
September 29	12:30 pm	at Wake Forest	BB&T Field; Winston-Salem, NC (rivalry)	ACCN	W 34–27	28,743
October 6	3:00 pm	Virginia	Wallace Wade Stadium; Durham, NC	ACCRN	W 42–17	26,856
October 13	12:30 pm	at Virginia Tech	Lane Stadium; Blacksburg, VA	ACCN	L 20–41	65,632
October 20	7:00 pm	North Carolina	Wallace Wade Stadium; Durham, NC (Victory Bell)	ESPNU	W 33–30	33,941
October 27	3:30 pm	at No. 10 Florida State	Doak Campbell Stadium; Tallahassee, FL	ESPNU	L 7–48	71,467
November 3	7:00 pm	No. 9 Clemson	Wallace Wade Stadium; Durham, NC	ESPN2	L 20–56	31,894
November 17	3:30 pm	at Georgia Tech	Bobby Dodd Stadium; Atlanta, GA	ESPNU	L 24–42	41,904
November 24	12:30 pm	Miami (FL)	Wallace Wade Stadium; Durham, NC	ACCN	L 45–52	26,895
December 27	6:30 pm	vs. Cincinnati*	Bank of America Stadium; Charlotte, NC (Belk Bowl)	ESPN	L 34–48	48,128
*Non-conference game; ^{†}Homecoming; Rankings from Coaches Poll released prior to the game; All times are in Eastern time

== Game summaries ==
=== FIU ===
	1	2	3	4	Total
Panthers	7	7	0	12	26
Blue Devils	7	30	7	2	46

=== At No. 21 Stanford ===
	1	2	3	4	Total
Blue Devils	0	3	10	0	13
No. 21 Cardinal	13	10	20	7	50

=== North Carolina Central ===
	1	2	3	4	Total
Eagles	7	3	0	7	17
Blue Devils	17	10	14	13	54

=== Memphis ===
	1	2	3	4	Total
Tigers	0	14	0	0	14
Blue Devils	0	17	7	14	38

=== At Wake Forest ===
	1	2	3	4	Total
Blue Devils	10	3	7	14	34
Demon Deacons	7	3	10	7	27

=== Virginia ===
	1	2	3	4	Total
Cavaliers	14	3	0	0	17
Blue Devils	14	0	14	14	42

=== At Virginia Tech ===
	1	2	3	4	Total
Blue Devils	20	0	0	0	20
Hokies	7	10	17	7	41

=== North Carolina ===
	1	2	3	4	Total
Tar Heels	3	3	3	21	30
Blue Devils	10	10	3	10	33

=== at. No. 10 Florida State ===
	1	2	3	4	Total
Blue Devils	0	7	0	0	7
No. 10 Seminoles	17	14	14	3	48

=== No. 9 Clemson ===
	1	2	3	4	Total
No. 9 Tigers	28	14	7	7	56
Blue Devils	10	7	3	0	20

=== At Georgia Tech ===
	1	2	3	4	Total
Blue Devils	7	10	7	0	24
Yellow Jackets	7	14	7	14	42

=== Miami (FL) ===
	1	2	3	4	Total
Hurricanes	14	14	17	7	52
Blue Devils	3	7	14	21	45

=== Vs. Cincinnati (Belk Bowl) ===
	1	2	3	4	Total
Blue Devils	16	0	8	10	34
Bearcats	3	14	10	21	48
