= 2012 Cincinnati Bearcats football team =

American college football season

2012 Cincinnati Bearcats football

Big East co-champion Lambert-Meadowlands Trophy Belk Bowl champion

Belk Bowl, W 48–34 vs. Duke
- Conference: Big East Conference

Ranking
- Coaches: No. 22
- Record: 10–3 (5–2 Big East)
- Head coach: Butch Jones (3rd season; regular season); Steve Stripling (interim, bowl game)
- Offensive coordinator: Mike Bajakian (3rd season)
- Offensive scheme: Multiple
- Defensive coordinator: John Jancek (3rd season)
- Base defense: 4–3
- Home stadium: Nippert Stadium

2012 Big East Conference football standings
	Conf.			Overall
Team	W		L	W		L
No. 13 Louisville $+	5	–	2	11	–	2
Cincinnati +	5	–	2	10	–	3
Rutgers +	5	–	2	9	–	4
Syracuse +	5	–	2	8	–	5
Pittsburgh	3	–	4	6	–	7
Connecticut	2	–	5	5	–	7
Temple	2	–	5	4	–	7
South Florida	1	–	6	3	–	9
$ – BCS representative as conference champion; + – Conference co-champions; Rankings from AP Poll

The 2012 Cincinnati Bearcats football team represented the University of Cincinnati as a member of the Big East Conference during the 2012 NCAA Division I FBS football season. The Bearcats, led by third-year head coach Butch Jones, played their home games at Nippert Stadium. They finished the season 10–3 overall and 5–2 in Big East play to place in a four-way tie for the conference championship. Along with Rutgers, Louisville, and Syracuse, the Bearcats were the final football champions of the Big East Conference, as the league's original incarnation folded following the loss of the three former programs and others to different conferences. Cincinnati became a charter member of the American Athletic Conference the following season.

The 2012 Cincinnati team was invited to the Belk Bowl where they defeated Duke. At the end of the regular season, Jones resigned to take the same head coaching position at Tennessee. Defensive line coach Steve Stripling was named the interim head coach for the Belk Bowl.

== Schedule ==
Date	Time	Opponent	Rank	Site	TV	Result	Attendance
September 6	8:00 pm	Pittsburgh		Nippert Stadium; Cincinnati, OH (River City Rivalry)	ESPN	W 34–10	33,562
September 15	7:00 pm	Delaware State*		Nippert Stadium; Cincinnati, OH	ESPN3	W 23–7	27,112
September 29	3:30 pm	vs. Virginia Tech*		FedExField; Landover, MD	ESPNU	W 27–24	46,026
October 6	7:00 pm	Miami (OH)*^{†}		Nippert Stadium; Cincinnati, OH (Victory Bell)	FS Ohio	W 52–14	35,097
October 13	7:00 pm	Fordham*	No. 21	Nippert Stadium; Cincinnati, OH	ESPN3	W 49–17	26,317
October 20	7:00 pm	at Toledo*	No. 21	Glass Bowl; Toledo, OH	ESPN3	L 23−29	24,124
October 26	8:00 pm	at No. 16 Louisville		Papa John's Cardinal Stadium; Louisville, KY (Keg of Nails)	ESPN	L 31–34 ^{OT}	53,271
November 3	12:00 pm	Syracuse		Nippert Stadium; Cincinnati, OH	Big East Network	W 35–24	26,180
November 10	12:00 pm	at Temple		Lincoln Financial Field; Philadelphia, PA	Big East Network	W 34–10	20,192
November 17	12:00 pm	No. 22 Rutgers		Nippert Stadium; Cincinnati, OH	Big East Network	L 3–10	34,526
November 23	7:00 pm	South Florida		Nippert Stadium; Cincinnati, OH	ESPN	W 27–10	21,171
December 1	3:30 pm	at Connecticut		Rentschler Field; East Hartford, CT	ABC	W 34–17	33,112
December 27	6:30 pm	vs. Duke*		Bank of America Stadium; Charlotte, NC (Belk Bowl)	ESPN	W 48–34	48,128
*Non-conference game; ^{†}Homecoming; Rankings from AP Poll released prior to the game; All times are in Eastern time

== Game summaries ==
=== Pittsburgh ===
	1	2	3	4	Total
Panthers	0	0	3	7	10
Bearcats	14	3	7	10	34

=== Delaware State ===
	1	2	3	4	Total
Hornets	0	0	0	7	7
Bearcats	13	7	0	3	23

=== Virginia Tech ===
	1	2	3	4	Total
Hokies	0	7	0	17	24
Bearcats	3	3	7	14	27

=== Miami (OH) ===
	1	2	3	4	Total
RedHawks	6	8	0	0	14
Bearcats	14	10	21	7	52

=== Fordham ===
	1	2	3	4	Total
Rams	3	3	8	3	17
Bearcats	14	0	21	14	49

=== @ Toledo ===
	1	2	3	4	Total
#18 Bearcats	0	13	7	3	23
Rockets	10	6	10	3	29

=== @ Louisville ===
	1	2	3	4	OT	Total
Bearcats	10	7	7	7	0	31
#14 Cardinals	7	7	3	14	3	34

=== Syracuse ===
	1	2	3	4	Total
Orange	10	7	7	0	24
Bearcats	7	7	14	7	35

=== @ Temple ===
	1	2	3	4	Total
Bearcats	14	10	7	3	34
Owls	3	0	7	0	10

=== Rutgers ===
	1	2	3	4	Total
Scarlet Knights	0	7	0	3	10
Bearcats	0	0	0	3	3

=== South Florida ===
	1	2	3	4	Total
Bulls	0	0	3	7	10
Bearcats	7	6	7	7	27

=== @ Connecticut ===
	1	2	3	4	Total
Bearcats	7	7	7	13	34
Huskies	0	10	7	0	17

=== Duke–Belk Bowl ===
	1	2	3	4	Total
Bearcats	3	14	10	21	48
Blue Devils	16	0	8	10	34

The Bearcats made their first ever appearance in the Belk Bowl and their first ever meeting with Duke. The Blue Devils raced out to an early 16–0 lead in the first quarter after a punt was blocked and recovered for a touchdown. The Bearcats then scored 27 unanswered points capped off by a 46-yard touchdown run by George Winn. The Blue Devils then scored back to back touchdowns to take a 31–27 lead. The Bearcats retook the lead with a 25-yard touchdown pass from Brendan Kay to Chris Moore. The Blue Devils then tied the game with a 52-yard field goal and the game seemed headed to overtime. With under a minute to play TE Travis Kelce took a short pass from Kay and broke several would be tackles in racing 83 yards for the winning score. Insult was added to injury when Nick Temple stripped the ball from Duke QB Sean Renfree and dashed 55 yards with the stolen loaf for a score as time expired. The 48 points is the most points scored by the Bearcats in a bowl game, and would be their largest margin of victory in a bowl game since 1997. This also gave the Bearcats their first consecutive bowl wins since 1946–47. The win gave the Bearcats their 4th 10-win season in the past five years.

== Roster ==
2012 Cincinnati Bearcats
Running backs: 1 Ralph David Abernathy IV – Sophomore; 22 Jameel Poteat – Freshman; 23 Tion Green – Freshman; 25 Rob Rice – (redshirt) Freshman; 31 Deionte Buckley – Freshman; 32 George Winn – (redshirt) Senior; 38 Adam Fearing – Senior; 49 Anthony King – Junior; Wide receivers: 2 Dyjuan Lewis – (redshirt) Sophomore; 3 Braxton Lane – Freshman; 6 Anthony McClung – Junior; 7 Kenbrell Thompkins – Senior; 15 Chris Moore – (redshirt) Sophomore; 16 Damon Julian – Senior; 19 Shaq Washington – (redshirt) Freshman; 20 Leviticus Payne – Freshman; 24 Chris Burrell – Sophomore; 80 Alex Chisum – Sophomore; 82 Max Morrison – (redshirt) Freshman; 83 Danny Milligan – (redshirt) Senior; 84 Nate Cole – Freshman; 85 Bruce Horner – (redshirt) Senior; 87 Jacob Giltrow – (redshirt) Freshman; 87 Jeremy Graves – Freshman; 88 Shakim Alonzo – Freshman; Offensive linemen: 59 Deyshawn Bond – Freshman; 60 Sam Longo – Junior; 62 Cory Keebler – (redshirt) Sophomore; 63 Dan Sprague – (redshirt) Junior; 66 Sean McClellan – (redshirt) Junior; 68 Daniel Murray – (redshirt) Freshman; 69 Dominic Mainello – Sophomore; 71 Eric Lefeld – (redshirt) Sophomore; 73 Ryan Leahy – Freshman; 74 Justin Murray – (redshirt) Freshman; 75 Kevin Schloemer – Sophomore; 76 Austen Bujnoch – Junior; 77 Sean Hooey – Senior; 78 Parker Ehinger – (redshirt) Freshman; 79 Andre Cureton – (redshirt) Junior	Quarterbacks: 4 Munchie Legaux – Junior; 9 Patick Coyne – (redshirt) Freshman; 10 Bennie Coney – Freshman; 11 Brendon Kay – (redshirt) Senior; 12 Trenton Norvell – Freshman; Tight ends: 18 Travis Kelce – (redshirt) Senior; 35 Josh Russ – Sophomore; 46 Jared Golden – Freshman; 48 Matt Staubachh – (redshirt) Freshman; 81 DJ Dowdy – Freshman; 86 Blake Annen – (redshirt) Junior; 86 Demetrius Richardson – Senior; Defensive linemen: 46 Mitch Meador – (redshirt) Junior; 50 Alex Pace – Freshman; 52 Elijah Shuler – Junior; 54 Walter Stewart – Junior; 55 Roney Lozano – (redshirt) Sophomore; 57 Carroll Phillips – Freshman; 58 Brandon Mills – (redshirt) Senior; 65 Connor Donnini – Freshman; 67 John Williams – Senior; 70 Brandon Mitchell – (redshirt) Freshman; 90 Camaron Beard – (redshirt) Sophomore; 91 Adam Dempsey – Sophomore; 92 Silverberry Mouhon – (redshirt) Freshman; 93 Brad Harrah – (redshirt) Sophomore; 94 Jordan Stepp – (redshirt) Junior; 95 Jonathan Burt – Freshman; 96 Josh Posley – Freshman; 97 Chad Hannah – (redshirt) Freshman; 98 Chad West – (redshirt) Freshman; 99 Dan Giordano – (redshirt) Senior; Defensive backs: 2 Trenier Orr – (redshirt) Freshman; 8 Adrian Witty – (redshirt) Sophomore; 9 Dominique Battle – Senior; 11 Deven Drane – Junior; 13 Pat Lambert – (redshirt) Senior; 17 Malcolm Murray – Senior; 20 Chris Williams – Senior; 21 Camerron Cheatham – Senior; 25 Arryn Chenault – Junior; 26 Drew Frey – Senior; 27 Drake Bruns – Freshman; 29 Andre Jones – Freshman; 30 Aaron Roberson – Senior; 35 Dylan Coombs – Freshman; 36 Marcus Foster – Freshman; 39 Demitri Beal – Sophomore; 40 Kevin Brown – Freshman; 48 Breon Mapp – Junior	Linebackers: 4 Maalik Bomar – Senior; 10 Jordan Luallen – (redshirt) Junior; 33 Solomon Tentman – (redshirt) Sophomore; 37 Joey Jones – Freshman; 38 Mason Antoun – (redshirt) Freshman; 41 Kevin Hyland – (redshirt) Freshman; 42 Corey Griffin – Freshman; 43 Nick Temple – Sophomore; 44 Corey Mason – (redshirt) Sophomore; 45 Ey'Shawn McClain – Freshman; 46 Devin Bruns – Freshman; 47 Colin Lozier – Senior; 48 Jeff Luc – Junior; 50 Innocent Macha – Sophomore; 51 Greg Blair – Senior; 53 Franklin Bruscianelli – Freshman; 57 Clemente Casseus – Freshman; Special teams: 14 Tony Miliano – (redshirt) Sophomore (K); 61 Kirk Willis – (redshirt) Freshman (LS); 24 John Lloyd – Sophomore (P); 34 Pat O'Donnell – Junior (P); 35 Eric Ernst – (redshirt) Freshman (P); Head coach: Butch Jones; Assistant coaches: Steve Stripling – Asst HC/co-defensive Coord/DL; Mike Bajakian – Offensive coordinator/quarterbacks coach; Mark Elder – Special teams coordinator/safeties; John Jancek – Defensive coordinator/linebackers; Don Mahoney – Offensive line Coach; Shannon Morrison – Cornerbacks coach; T. J. Weist – Wide receivers Coach/recruiting coordinator; Dave Johnson – Tight ends coach; Dave Lawson – Asst. AD/Sports Performance; Roy Manning – Running backs coach; Mike Szerszen – Director of Football Strength and Conditioning

=== Depth chart ===
Defense

FS
Arryn Chenault
Dominique Battle
⋅

WLB	MLB	SLB
⋅	Greg Blair	⋅
Solomon Tentman	Clemente Casseus	⋅
⋅	⋅	⋅

SS
Drew Frey
Malcolm Murray
⋅

CB
Camerron Cheatham
Leviticus Payne
⋅

DE	DT	DT	DE
Brandon Mills	Camaron Beard	Jordan Stepp	Dan Giordano
Josh Posley	Adam Dempsey	John Williams	Silverberry Mouhon
Elijah Shuler	⋅	Mitch Meador	⋅

CB
Deven Drane
Trenier Orr
⋅

Offense

WR
Kenbrell Thompkins
Chris Moore
Jeremy Graves

WR
Damon Julian
Alex Chisum
Nate Cole

LT	LG	C	RG	RT
Eric Lefeld	Austen Bujnoch	Dan Sprague	Sam Longo	Parker Ehinger
Cory Keebler	Andre Cureton	Dominic Mainello	Parker Ehinger	Sean Hooey
⋅	⋅	⋅	⋅	⋅

WR
⋅
⋅
⋅

WR
Anthony McClung
Danny Milligan
Shaq Washington

QB
Brendon Kay
Munchie Legaux
Patrick Coyne

RB
George Winn
Ralph David Abernathy IV
Jameel Poteat

Special teams
PK Tony Miliano
P Pat O’Donnell
P John Lloyd
KR Ralph David Abernathy IV/Anthony McClung
PR Danny Milligan
LS Kirk Willis
H Pat O’Donnell

== Awards and milestones ==
=== Big East Conference honors ===
==== Big East Conference All-Conference First Team ====
- George Winn, RB
- Travis Kelce, TE
- Eric Lefeld, OL

==== Big East Conference All-Conference Second Team ====
- Austen Bujnoch, OL
- Dan Giordano, DL
- Greg Blair, LB
- Pat O'Donnell, P

==== Big East Conference All-Conference Third Team ====
- Ralph David Abernathy IV, KR
- Walter Stewart, DL
- Maalik Bomar, LB
- Drew Frey, DB
- Anthony McClung, PR

== Rankings ==
Ranking movements Legend: ██ Increase in ranking ██ Decrease in ranking — = Not ranked RV = Received votes
	Week															
Poll	Pre	1	2	3	4	5	6	7	8	9	10	11	12	13	14	Final
AP	RV	RV	—	RV	RV	RV	21	21	RV	RV	—	—	RV	RV	RV	RV
Coaches	RV	RV	RV	RV	RV	23	20	18	RV	RV	—	RV	RV	RV	RV	22
Harris	Not released						20	18	RV	RV	—	RV	RV	RV	RV	Not released
BCS	Not released							21	—	—	—	—	—	—	—	Not released

== Players in the 2013 NFL draft ==
Player	Position	Round	Pick	NFL club
Travis Kelce	TE	3	63	Kansas City Chiefs
