= 2012 Pittsburgh Panthers football team =

American college football season

2012 Pittsburgh Panthers football

BBVA Compass Bowl, L 17–38 vs. Ole Miss
- Conference: Big East Conference
- Record: 6–7 (3–4 Big East)
- Head coach: Paul Chryst (1st season)
- Offensive coordinator: Joe Rudolph (1st season)
- Offensive scheme: Pro-style
- Defensive coordinator: Dave Huxtable (1st season)
- Base defense: 4–3
- Home stadium: Heinz Field

2012 Big East Conference football standings
	Conf.			Overall
Team	W		L	W		L
No. 13 Louisville $+	5	–	2	11	–	2
Cincinnati +	5	–	2	10	–	3
Rutgers +	5	–	2	9	–	4
Syracuse +	5	–	2	8	–	5
Pittsburgh	3	–	4	6	–	7
Connecticut	2	–	5	5	–	7
Temple	2	–	5	4	–	7
South Florida	1	–	6	3	–	9
$ – BCS representative as conference champion; + – Conference co-champions; Rankings from AP Poll

The 2012 Pittsburgh Panthers football team represented the University of Pittsburgh in the 2012 NCAA Division I FBS football season. The Panthers were led by first-year head coach Paul Chryst and played their home games at Heinz Field. They were a member of the Big East Conference. This was Pitt's last season as a member of the Big East. Next season, they began play in the ACC.

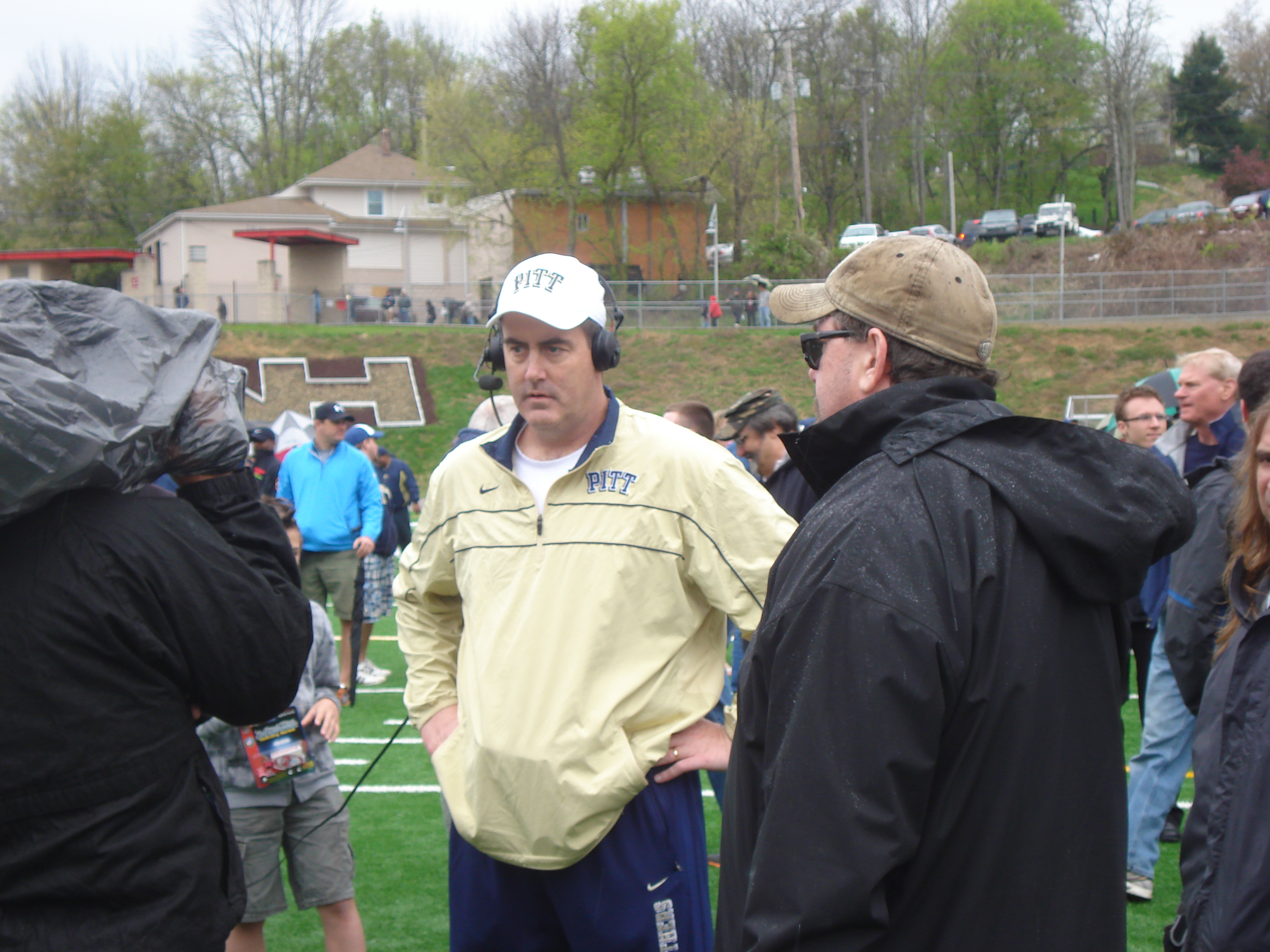
New head coach Paul Chryst being interviewed after the spring Blue and Gold game

== Schedule ==
Date	Time	Opponent	Site	TV	Result	Attendance
September 1	6:00 p.m.	No. 13 (FCS) Youngstown State*	Heinz Field; Pittsburgh, PA	ESPN3	L 17–31	40,837
September 6	8:00 p.m.	at Cincinnati	Nippert Stadium; Cincinnati, OH (River City Rivalry)	ESPN	L 10–34	33,562
September 15	12:00 p.m.	No. 13 Virginia Tech*	Heinz Field; Pittsburgh, PA	ESPNU	W 35–17	48,032
September 22	3:30 p.m.	Gardner–Webb*	Heinz Field; Pittsburgh, PA	ESPN3	W 55–10	36,452
October 5	7:00 p.m.	at Syracuse	Carrier Dome; Syracuse, NY (rivalry)	ESPN	L 13–14	40,394
October 13	11:00 a.m.	No. 18 Louisville^{†}	Heinz Field; Pittsburgh, PA	ESPNU	L 35–45	42,432
October 20	3:30 p.m.	at Buffalo*	University at Buffalo Stadium; Amherst, NY	ESPN+	W 20–6	17,021
October 27	12:00 p.m.	Temple	Heinz Field; Pittsburgh, PA	Big East Network	W 47–17	42,425
November 3	3:30 p.m.	at No. 3 Notre Dame*	Notre Dame Stadium; Notre Dame, IN (rivalry)	NBC	L 26–29 ^{3OT}	80,795
November 9	8:00 p.m.	at Connecticut	Rentschler Field; East Hartford, CT	ESPN2	L 17–24	33,503
November 24	12:00 p.m.	No. 19 Rutgers	Heinz Field; Pittsburgh, PA	ESPN2	W 27–6	38,786
December 1	7:00 p.m.	at South Florida	Raymond James Stadium; Tampa, FL	ESPN2	W 27–3	35,141
January 5	1:00 p.m.	vs. Ole Miss*	Legion Field; Birmingham, AL (BBVA Compass Bowl)	ESPN	L 17–38	59,135
*Non-conference game; ^{†}Homecoming; Rankings from AP Poll released prior to the game; All times are in Eastern time

== Personnel ==
=== Coaching staff ===
2012 Pittsburgh Panthers football staff
Coaching staff: Paul Chryst – Head coach; Joe Rudolph – Assistant head coach/offensive coordinator/tight ends; Dave Huxtable – Defensive coordinator; Brooks Bollinger – Quarterbacks; Inoke Breckterfield – Defensive line; Bobby Engram – Wide receivers; Chris Haering – Linebackers; Matt House – Secondary; Jim Hueber – Offensive line; Desmond Robinson – Running backs	Support staff: Chris LaSala – Assistant Athletic Director/football operations; Bob Junko – Director of Football Relations and Program Enhancement; Dave Bucar – Offensive graduate assistant; Nate Tice – Offensive graduate assistant; Mike Buscemi – Defensive graduate assistant; Eric Wicks – Defensive graduate assistant	Strength and conditioning staff: Todd Rice – Strength and conditioning coach; Craig Buckley – Assistant strength and conditioning coach; Dantonio Burnette – Assistant strength and conditioning coach

=== Roster ===
2012 Pittsburgh Panthers football roster
Quarterback: 10 – Trey Anderson – sophomore (6'0, 195); 16 – Chad Voytik – freshman (6'1, 215); 18 – Tom Savage – (redshirt) junior (6'5, 230); Running back: 4 – Rushel Shell – freshman (5'10, 220); 30 – Desmond Brown – (redshirt) junior (5'9, 200); 32 – Malcolm Crockett – (redshirt) freshman (5'10, 205); 34 – Isaac Bennett – sophomore (5'11, 210); Wide receiver: 14 – Ronald Jones – sophomore (5'8, 170); 15 – Devin Street – (redshirt) junior (6'4, 195); 17 – Chris Wuestner – freshman (6'2, 210); 20 – Brandon Ifill – (redshirt) sophomore (6'1, 200); 22 – Chris Davis – freshman (5'9, 185); 36 – Brett Zuck – (redshirt) sophomore (6'1, 195); 81 – Brendon Felder – (redshirt) sophomore (5'10, 190); 82 – Demitrious Davis – freshman (5'9, 185); 84 – Ed Tinker – (redshirt) junior (6'2, 195); 88 – Kevin Weatherspoon – (redshirt) sophomore (5'10, 175); Placekicker: 7 – Brad Lukasak – freshman (5'11, 165); 48 – Drake Greer – (redshirt) sophomore (6'4, 205); Punter: 92 – Matt Yoklic – (redshirt) junior (6'4, 220)	Tight end: 4 – Drew Carswell – (redshirt) sophomore (6'4, 220); 86 – J.P. Holtz – freshman (6'4, 250); Fullback: 37 – David Durham – (redshirt) sophomore (6'2, 240); 38 – Anthony Rippole – freshman (5'10, 230); 43 – Mark Giubilato – (redshirt) sophomore (6'2, 235); 46 – Adam Lazenga – (redshirt) sophomore (6'0, 245); Offensive lineman: 56 – Arthur Doakes – (redshirt) sophomore (6'6, 340); 57 – Artie Rowell – (redshirt) freshman (6'2, 310); 62 – John Guy – freshman (6'7, 310); 64 – Shane Johnson – (redshirt) sophomore (6'5, 330); 69 – Adam Bisnowaty – freshman (6'6, 305); 70 – Juantez Hollins – (redshirt) junior (6'5, 330); 71 – Gabe Roberts – freshman (6'5, 300); 74 – Matt Rotheram – (redshirt) sophomore (6'6, 335); 76 – Ryan Schlieper – (redshirt) junior (6'5, 310); 78 – Cory King – (redshirt) junior (6'6, 325); Defensive lineman: 37 – Keegan Buck – (redshirt) freshman (6'1, 200); 50 – Tyrone Ezell – (redshirt) junior (6'4, 305); 55 – Terrell Jackson – freshman (6'3, 275); 72 – Jack Lippert – (redshirt) junior (6'4, 260); 90 – T. J. Clemmings – (redshirt) sophomore (6'6, 315); 91 – Darryl Render – freshman (6'2, 300); 92 – Devin Cook – (redshirt) freshman (6'4, 240); 93 – Bryan Murphy – (redshirt) sophomore (6'3, 255); 95 – Khaynin Mosley-Smith – sophomore (6'0, 305); 97 – Aaron Donald – junior (6'0, 285); 98 – LaQuentin Smith – sophomore (6'2, 280)	Linebacker: 3 – Nicholas Grigsby – (redshirt) freshman (6'1, 220); 4 – Bam Bradley – freshman (6'2, 220); 5 – Ejuan Price – sophomore (6'0, 255); 8 – Todd Thomas – (redshirt) sophomore (6'2, 230); 11 – Deaysean Rippy – freshman (6'2, 240); 30 – Mike Caprara – freshman (6'0, 215); 40 – Dan Mason – (redshirt) junior (6'1, 230); 44 – Shane Gordon – (redshirt) junior (6'0, 240); 47 – Devon Porchia – freshman (6'2, 245); 49 – Eric Williams – (redshirt) sophomore (6'3, 215); 59 – Emanuel Rackard – (redshirt) junior (6'0, 235); Defensive back: 2 – K'Waun Williams – junior (5'10, 195); 9 – Ray Vinopal – (redshirt) sophomore (5'10, 200); 10 – Jahmahl Pardner – freshman (5'11, 175); 17 – Jevonte Pitts – freshman (5'11, 205); 19 – Ethan Brown – freshman (5'10, 195); 23 – Lafayette Pitts – (redshirt) freshman (5'11, 195); 24 – Cullen Christian – (redshirt) sophomore (6'0, 195); 25 – Jason Hendricks – (redshirt) junior (6'0, 190); 28 – Anthony Gonzalez – (redshirt) sophomore (6'3, 230); 31 – Trenton Coles – freshman (6'3, 175); 35 – E.J. Banks – (redshirt) junior (5'11, 190); 38 – Ryan Lewis – freshman (6'0, 195); 39 – Pat Fisher – (redshirt) sophomore (5'9, 185); Long snappers: 58 – Kevin Barthelemy – (redshirt) junior (6'3, 245); 59 – Pat Quirin – freshman (6'1, 220); 67 – David Murphy – (redshirt) freshman (6'1, 220)
Source and player details, 2012 Pittsburgh Panthers football roster (10/1/2022):
