= Steve Stripling =

American football player and coach (born 1953)

Biographical details
- Born: November 25, 1953 (age 72)

Playing career
- 1974–1975: Colorado
- Position: Offensive lineman

Coaching career (HC unless noted)
- 1977–1978: Colorado (GA)
- 1979: North Carolina (assistant)
- 1980–1983: Northern Illinois (OL)
- 1984–1989: Indiana (OL)
- 1990–1995: Indiana (DL)
- 1996: Indiana (DC/LB)
- 1997–2000: Minnesota (LB/RC)
- 2001–2002: Louisville (DL)
- 2003–2004: Michigan State (DL)
- 2005–2007: Michigan (DL)
- 2009: Central Michigan (AHC/DE)
- 2009: Central Michigan (interim HC)
- 2010–2012: Cincinnati (AHC/DL)
- 2012: Cincinnati (interim HC)
- 2013–2017: Tennessee (AHC/DL)
- 2018–2019: Cincinnati (DL)

Head coaching record
- Overall: 2–0
- Bowls: 2–0

Steve Stripling (born November 25, 1953) is a retired American college football coach and former player. He was most recently the defensive line coach at the University of Cincinnati. Stripling served as interim head coach at Central Michigan University in 2009 and the University of Cincinnati in 2012. He coached Central Michigan in the 2010 GMAC Bowl and Cincinnati in the 2012 Belk Bowl, compiling an overall record of 2–0.

== Head coaching record ==
Year	Team	Overall	Conference	Standing	Bowl/playoffs	Coaches^{#}	AP^{°}
Central Michigan Chippewas (Mid-American Conference) (2009)
2009	Central Michigan	1–0			W GMAC	24	23
Central Michigan:		1–0	0–0				
Cincinnati Bearcats (Big East Conference) (2012)
2012	Cincinnati	1–0			W Belk	22	
Cincinnati:		1–0	0–0				
Total:		2–0					
^{#}Rankings from final Coaches Poll.; ^{°}Rankings from final AP Poll.
