= 2012 Louisville Cardinals football team =

American college football season

2012 Louisville Cardinals football

Big East co-champion Sugar Bowl champion

Sugar Bowl, W 33–23 vs. Florida
- Conference: Big East Conference

Ranking
- Coaches: No. 13
- AP: No. 13
- Record: 11–2 (5–2 Big East)
- Head coach: Charlie Strong (3rd season)
- Offensive coordinator: Shawn Watson (1st season)
- Offensive scheme: Pro-style
- Defensive coordinator: Vance Bedford (3rd season)
- Base defense: 4–3
- Home stadium: Papa John's Cardinal Stadium

2012 Big East Conference football standings
	Conf.			Overall
Team	W		L	W		L
No. 13 Louisville $+	5	–	2	11	–	2
Cincinnati +	5	–	2	10	–	3
Rutgers +	5	–	2	9	–	4
Syracuse +	5	–	2	8	–	5
Pittsburgh	3	–	4	6	–	7
Connecticut	2	–	5	5	–	7
Temple	2	–	5	4	–	7
South Florida	1	–	6	3	–	9
$ – BCS representative as conference champion; + – Conference co-champions; Rankings from AP Poll

The 2012 Louisville Cardinals football team represented the University of Louisville in the 2012 NCAA Division I FBS football season. The Cardinals were led by third-year head coach Charlie Strong and played their home games at Papa John's Cardinal Stadium. They were a member of the Big East Conference. They finished the season 11–2, 5–2 in Big East play to finish in a four-way tie for the Big East championship. As the highest rated of the four Big East champions in the final BCS poll, the Cardinals received the conference's automatic bid into a BCS game. They were invited to the Sugar Bowl where they upset the heavily favored Florida Gators.

== Personnel ==
=== Coaching staff ===
Name	Position	Seasons at Louisville	Alma mater (Year)
Charlie Strong	Head Coach	3rd	Central Arkansas (1983)
Shawn Watson	Offensive Coordinator and Quarterbacks	2nd	Southern Illinois (1982)
Vance Bedford	Defensive Coordinator	3rd	Texas (1981)
Clint Hurtt	Associate head coach, Defensive Line and recruiting coordinator	3rd	Miami (FL) (2001)
Ron Dugans	Wide receivers	3rd	Florida State (1999)
Brian Jean-Mary	Linebackers	3rd	Appalachian State (1998)
Tommy Restivo	Secondary	3rd	Georgetown College (2006)
Dave Borbely	Offensive Line and Running Game Coordinator	3rd	DePauw (1981)
Kenny Carter	Running Backs and Special Team	3rd	The Citadel (1989)
Sherrone Moore	Tight ends	4th	Oklahoma (2008)

== Schedule ==
Date	Time	Opponent	Rank	Site	TV	Result	Attendance
September 2	3:30 p.m.	Kentucky*	No. 25	Papa John's Cardinal Stadium; Louisville, Kentucky (Battle for the Governor's Cup)	ESPN	W 32–14	55,386
September 8	3:30 p.m.	Missouri State*	No. 23	Papa John's Cardinal Stadium; Louisville, Kentucky	WHAS	W 35–7	47,553
September 15	3:30 p.m.	North Carolina*	No. 19	Papa John's Cardinal Stadium; Louisville, Kentucky	ABC/ESPN2	W 39–34	53,334
September 22	7:00 p.m.	at FIU*	No. 20	FIU Stadium; Miami	ESPN3	W 28–21	12,318
September 29	8:00 p.m.	at Southern Miss*	No. 19	M. M. Roberts Stadium; Hattiesburg, Mississippi	CBSSN	W 21–17	23,492
October 13	11:00 a.m.	at Pittsburgh	No. 18	Heinz Field; Pittsburgh	ESPNU	W 45–35	42,432
October 20	3:30 p.m.	South Florida	No. 16	Papa John's Cardinal Stadium; Louisville, Kentucky	ABC	W 27–25	50,167
October 26	8:00 p.m.	Cincinnati	No. 16	Papa John's Cardinal Stadium; Louisville, Kentucky (Battle for the Keg of Nails)	ESPN	W 34–31 ^{OT}	53,271
November 3	12:00 p.m.	Temple	No. 12	Papa John's Cardinal Stadium; Louisville, Kentucky	ABC/ESPN3	W 45–17	44,609
November 10	12:00 p.m.	at Syracuse	No. 11	Carrier Dome; Syracuse, New York	ABC	L 26–45	40,312
November 24	12:00 p.m.	Connecticut	No. 19	Papa John's Cardinal Stadium; Louisville, Kentucky	Big East Network	L 20–23 ^{3OT}	45,618
November 29	7:30 p.m.	at Rutgers		High Point Solutions Stadium; Piscataway, New Jersey	ESPN	W 20–17	52,798
January 2, 2013	8:30 p.m.	vs. No. 4 Florida*	No. 22	Mercedes-Benz Superdome; New Orleans (Sugar Bowl) (College GameDay)	ESPN	W 33–23	54,178
*Non-conference game; Rankings from AP Poll released prior to the game; All times are in Eastern time

== Rankings ==
Ranking movements Legend: ██ Increase in ranking ██ Decrease in ranking — = Not ranked RV = Received votes
	Week															
Poll	Pre	1	2	3	4	5	6	7	8	9	10	11	12	13	14	Final
AP	25	23	19	20	19	19	18	16	16	12	11	20	19	RV	22	13
Coaches	RV	24	20	18	17	16	16	14	14	10	10	18	18	23	18	13
Harris	Not released						18	16	14	10	10	17	18	24	19	Not released
BCS	Not released							16	16	10	9	19	20	—	21	Not released

== Roster ==
2012 Louisville Cardinals
Running backs: 36 Bo Eggers – (redshirt) Senior; 10 Dominique Brown – Junior; 32 Senorise Perry – Junior; 20 Corvin Lamb – (redshirt) Freshman; 28 Jeremy Wright – (redshirt) Junior; 30 Kamal Hogan – (redshirt) Sophomore; 48 Nick Heuser – (redshirt) Senior; 49 Jarel McGriff-Culver – (redshirt) Sophomore; Wide receivers: 2 Michaelee Haris – (redshirt) Sophomore; 3 Charles Gaines – (redshirt) Freshman; 4 Robert Clark – (redshirt) Sophomore; 7 Damian Copeland – (redshirt) Junior; 9 DeVante Parker – Sophomore; 14 Andrell Smith – Senior; 29 Stephen Goodwin – (redshirt) Junior; 31 DeMarcus Topp – (redshirt) Senior; 82 Eli Rogers – Sophomore; 84 Aaron Nace – (redshirt) Sophomore; 84 Matt Milton – (redshirt) Sophomore; 87 Kai Dominguez – (redshirt) Sophomore; 88 Jarrett Davis – Junior; 89 Scott Radcliff – Senior; Offensive line: 53 Jake Smith – (redshirt) Sophomore; 54 Mike Romano – (redshirt) Freshman; 55 Mario Benavides – (redshirt) Senior; 59 Zach Perkins – (redshirt) Junior; 63 Josh Stearns – (redshirt) Freshman; 64 David Noltemeyer – Sophomore; 64 Brandon Bramer – (redshirt) Freshman; 66 Alex Kupper – (redshirt) Senior; 68 Kamran Joyer – (redshirt) Junior; 69 Chris Walker – (redshirt) Junior; 70 John Miller – Sophomore; 71 Chris Acosta – (redshirt) Sophomore; 72 Hunter Stout – (redshirt) Junior; 74 Ryan Mack – (redshirt) Freshman; 76 Chase Petersen – (redshirt) Freshman; 78 Aaron Epps – (redshirt) Freshman; 79 Jamon Brown – Sophomore	Quarterbacks: 4 Will Stein – (redshirt) Senior; 5 Teddy Bridgewater – Sophomore; 12 Luke Brohm – (redshirt) Freshman; 19 Jerry Arlinghaus – (redshirt) Freshman; Tight ends: 32 Gerald Christian – (redshirt) Sophomore; 80 Stephon Ball – (redshirt) Senior; 81 Chris White – (redshirt) Junior; 83 Ryan Hubbell – (redshirt) Sophomore; 85 Nate Nord – (redshirt) Senior; 15 Hunter Bowles – (redshirt) Freshman; Defensive line: 17 Marcus Smith – Junior; 44 B.J. Butler – Junior; 47 Malcolm Mitchell – (redshirt) Junior; 48 Deiontrez Mount – Sophomore; 57 Jordan Tennyson – (redshirt) Sophomore; 90 B.J. Dubose – Sophomore; 92 Brandon Dunn – Junior; 93 Roy Philon – (redshirt) Junior; 94 Lorenzo Mauldin – Sophomore; 98 Dominique Dishmon – (redshirt) Freshman; 99 Jamaine Brooks – (redshirt) Sophomore; Defensive backs: 8 Gerod Holliman – Freshman; 15 Andrew Johnson – Sophomore; 18 Titus Teague – Junior; 19 Terell Floyd – Sophomore; 21 Adrian Bushell – (redshirt) Senior; 22 Jordan Paschal – (redshirt) Sophomore; 25 Calvin Pryor – Sophomore; 26 Zed Evans – Junior; 27 Jermaine Reve – (redshirt) Freshman; 29 Hakeem Smith – Junior; 30 Anthony Branch – (redshirt) Junior; 41 Stephan Robinson – (redshirt) Sophomore; 45 Mitchell Nelson – (redshirt) Freshman	Linebackers: 1 Keith Brown – Freshman; 2 Preston Brown – Junior; 13 James Burgess – Freshman; 24 Daniel Brown – (redshirt) Senior; 27 Mike Adessa – (redshirt) Junior; 31 Champ Lee – Junior; 32 Alex Witcpalek – Junior; 34 George Durant – Junior; 37 Tyon Dixon – (redshirt) Sophomore; 38 Thaddeus Franklin – (redshirt) Sophomore; 40 Chris Zelli – Senior; 42 Jalen Harrington – Freshman; 43 Deon Rogers – Junior; Special teams: 18 Matthew Nakatani – (redshirt) Sophomore (K); 33 Grant Donovan – (redshirt) Sophomore (LS); 35 Andrew Fletcher – (redshirt) Freshman (K); 38 Ryan Johnson – (redshirt) Sophomore (P); 45 John Wallace – (redshirt) Freshman (P/K); Head coach: Charlie Strong; Assistant coaches: Shawn Watson – Offensive coordinator/quarterbacks coach; Vance Bedford – Defensive coordinator; Kenny Carter – Special teams coordinator/running backs coach; Dave Borbely – Offensive line coach; Ron Dugans – Wide receivers coach; Sherrone Moore - Tight ends coach; Clint Hurtt – Recruiting doordinator/defensive line coach; Brian Jean-Mary – Linebackers coach; Larry Slade – Secondary coach; Pat Moorer – Strength and conditioning coach
