= 2012 North Carolina Tar Heels football team =

American college football season

2012 North Carolina Tar Heels football
- Conference: Atlantic Coast Conference
- Coastal Division
- Record: 8–4 (5–3 ACC)
- Head coach: Larry Fedora (1st season)
- Offensive coordinator: Blake Anderson (1st season)
- Offensive scheme: Spread
- Defensive coordinator: Dan Disch (1st season)
- Base defense: 4–2–5
- Captains: Giovani Bernard; Jonathan Cooper; Pete Mangum; Kevin Reddick; Sylvester Williams
- Home stadium: Kenan Memorial Stadium

2012 Atlantic Coast Conference football standings
	Conf.			Overall
Team	W		L	W		L
Atlantic Division
No. 10 Florida State xy$	7	–	1	12	–	2
No. 11 Clemson x	7	–	1	11	–	2
NC State	4	–	4	7	–	6
Wake Forest	3	–	5	5	–	7
Maryland	2	–	6	4	–	8
Boston College	1	–	7	2	–	10
Coastal Division
Georgia Tech xy	5	–	3	7	–	7
North Carolina†	5	–	3	8	–	4
Miami (FL)‡	5	–	3	7	–	5
Virginia Tech	4	–	4	7	–	6
Duke	3	–	5	6	–	7
Virginia	2	–	6	4	–	8
Championship: Florida State 21, Georgia Tech 15
$ – BCS representative as conference champion; x – Division champion/co-champions; y – Championship game participant; † North Carolina ineligible for ACC title, championship game, and bowl game due to NCAA sanctions. ‡ Miami ineligible for ACC title, championship game, and bowl game due to self-imposed sanctions.; Rankings from AP Poll

The 2012 North Carolina Tar Heels football team represented the University of North Carolina at Chapel Hill as a member of Coastal Division of the Atlantic Coast Conference (ACC) during the 2012 NCAA Division I FBS football season. The team was led by first-year head coach Larry Fedora and played their home games at Kenan Memorial Stadium. The Tar Heels finished the season 8–4 overall and 5–3 in ACC play to tie for first in the Coastal Division with the Georgia Tech Yellow Jackets and the Miami Hurricanes. Due to NCAA sanctions imposed in the wake of the University of North Carolina at Chapel Hill football scandal, North Carolina was ineligible for the conference title and banned for postseason play for the 2012 season.

== Sanctions from scandal ==
On March 12, 2012, the university was notified of penalties issued by the NCAA Committee on Infractions for violations discovered in the 2010 season. North Carolina was banned from all postseason play in 2012, including bowl games and the ACC Championship Game. Also, UNC was placed probation for three years and lost five scholarships per season for three seasons beginning with the recruiting class of 2013.

== Recruiting ==
National Signing Day was on February 1, 2012, and was the first chance for high school seniors to officially declare which university or college they will be attending for their college career. North Carolina had 23 high school seniors sign a National Letter of Intent to play football with them. Terrance Knox and Shakeel Rashad both graduated from high school early and enrolled at UNC in January 2012.

College recruiting information (2012)
Name	Hometown	School	Height	Weight	40^{‡}	Commit date
Kanler Coker; QB	Flowery Branch, GA	Flowery Branch HS	6 ft 4 in (1.93 m)	205 lb (93 kg)	4.75	Jan 16, 2012
Kanler Coker; QB	Recruit ratings: Scout: Rivals: (73)					
Kedrick Davis; WR	Charlotte, NC	Berry Academy	5 ft 10 in (1.78 m)	165 lb (75 kg)	4.3	Jun 11, 2011
Kedrick Davis; WR	Recruit ratings: Scout: Rivals: (77)					
Quinshad Davis; WR	Gaffney, SC	Gaffney HS	6 ft 4 in (1.93 m)	185 lb (84 kg)	4.6	Feb 1, 2012
Quinshad Davis; WR	Recruit ratings: Scout: Rivals: (79)					
John Ferranto; OL	Burlington, NJ	Township HS	6 ft 5 in (1.96 m)	270 lb (120 kg)	5.23	Jun 3, 2011
John Ferranto; OL	Recruit ratings: Scout: Rivals: (45)					
Clint Heaven; S	Palmetto, FL	Manatee HS	6 ft 0 in (1.83 m)	190 lb (86 kg)	4.89	Jan 19, 2012
Clint Heaven; S	Recruit ratings: Scout: Rivals: (76)					
Jon Heck; OL	Jacksonville, FL	The Bolles School	6 ft 6 in (1.98 m)	290 lb (130 kg)	5.2	Jun 30, 2011
Jon Heck; OL	Recruit ratings: Scout: Rivals: (77)					
Joe Jackson; LB	Jacksonville, FL	First Coast HS	6 ft 2 in (1.88 m)	210 lb (95 kg)	4.65	Nov 7, 2011
Joe Jackson; LB	Recruit ratings: Scout: Rivals: (79)					
T. J. Jiles; CB	Cape Coral, FL	Cape Coral HS	5 ft 11 in (1.80 m)	165 lb (75 kg)	4.55	Oct 10, 2011
T. J. Jiles; CB	Recruit ratings: Scout: Rivals: (75)					
Terrance Knox; TE	Concord, NC	Concord HS	6 ft 2 in (1.88 m)	240 lb (110 kg)	4.7	Jun 1, 2011
Terrance Knox; TE	Recruit ratings: Scout: Rivals: (78)					
Dan Mastromatteo; LB	Absecon, NJ	Holy Spirit HS	6 ft 2 in (1.88 m)	215 lb (98 kg)	4.86	Aug 4, 2011
Dan Mastromatteo; LB	Recruit ratings: Scout: Rivals: (78)					
J.J. Patterson; OL	Roanoke Rapids, NC	Roanoke Rapids HS	6 ft 4 in (1.93 m)	330 lb (150 kg)	5.25	Apr 9, 2011
J.J. Patterson; OL	Recruit ratings: Scout: Rivals: (79)					
Caleb Peterson; OL	Auburn, AL	Auburn HS	6 ft 5 in (1.96 m)	310 lb (140 kg)	5.45	Jan 18, 2012
Caleb Peterson; OL	Recruit ratings: Scout: Rivals: (80)					
Shakeel Rashad; LB	Jacksonville, FL	Episcopal HS	6 ft 2 in (1.88 m)	215 lb (98 kg)	4.89	Feb 3, 2011
Shakeel Rashad; LB	Recruit ratings: Scout: Rivals: (79)					
Jessie Rogers; DE	Arlington, TX	Bowie HS	6 ft 4 in (1.93 m)	240 lb (110 kg)	4.75	Sep 18, 2011
Jessie Rogers; DE	Recruit ratings: Scout: Rivals: (75)					
Malik Simmons; CB	Lehigh Acres, FL	Lehigh HS	5 ft 11 in (1.80 m)	180 lb (82 kg)	4.55	Oct 31, 2011
Malik Simmons; CB	Recruit ratings: Scout: Rivals: (77)					
Kendrick Singleton; WR	Macclenny, FL	Baker County HS	6 ft 2 in (1.88 m)	200 lb (91 kg)	4.5	Jan 28, 2012
Kendrick Singleton; WR	Recruit ratings: Scout: Rivals: (72)					
Nathan Staub; LB	Buford, GA	Buford HS	6 ft 2 in (1.88 m)	210 lb (95 kg)	4.65	Nov 15, 2011
Nathan Staub; LB	Recruit ratings: Scout: Rivals: (75)					
James Summers; QB	Greensboro, NC	Page HS	6 ft 2 in (1.88 m)	200 lb (91 kg)	4.74	Jan 26, 2012
James Summers; QB	Recruit ratings: Scout: Rivals: (79)					
Monte Taylor; DE	Springdale, MD	Flowers HS	6 ft 3 in (1.91 m)	235 lb (107 kg)	4.7	Jan 29, 2012
Monte Taylor; DE	Recruit ratings: Rivals: (75)					
Justin Thomason; DE	McDonough, GA	Eagle's Landing Christian Academy	6 ft 4 in (1.93 m)	240 lb (110 kg)	4.75	Jan 22, 2012
Justin Thomason; DE	Recruit ratings: Scout: Rivals: (76)					
Damien Washington; WR	Kannapolis, NC	A.L. Brown HS	6 ft 1 in (1.85 m)	180 lb (82 kg)	4.68	Aug 9, 2011
Damien Washington; WR	Recruit ratings: Scout: Rivals: (76)					
Phillip Williamson; LB	Durham, NC	Jordan HS	6 ft 3 in (1.91 m)	210 lb (95 kg)	4.84	May 20, 2011
Phillip Williamson; LB	Recruit ratings: Scout: Rivals: (77)					
Overall recruit ranking: Scout: 40 Rivals: 42
‡ Refers to 40-yard dash; Note: In many cases, Scout, Rivals, 247Sports, On3, and ESPN may conflict in their listings of height, weight and 40 time.; In these cases, the average was taken. ESPN grades are on a 100-point scale.; Sources: "North Carolina Commit List for 2012". Rivals.; "Scout.com Football Recruiting: North Carolina". Scout.; "RecruitTracker 2012: North Carolina". ESPN.; "Scout.com Team Recruiting Rankings". Scout.; "2012 Team Ranking". Rivals.com.

== Coaching staff ==
New football coach Larry Fedora officially took over as the head coach at UNC on January 1, 2012. He signed a 7-year contract worth more than $1.7 million annually. He takes over a team that is banned from a bowl game for the 2012–13 season.

Name.	Position	Seasons in Position
Larry Fedora	Head coach	1st
Deke Adams	Defensive Line	1st
Blake Anderson	Offensive coordinator/quarterbacks	1st
Walt Bell	Tight Ends	1st
Gunter Brewer	Passing game coordinator/wide receivers	1st (6th Overall at UNC)
Dan Disch	Defensive coordinator	1st
David Duggan	Defensive assistant/special teams coordinator	1st
Randy Jordan	Running backs coach	1st
Chris Kapilovic	Run game coordinator/offensive line	1st
Vic Koenning	Associate head coach for defense	1st
Lou Hernandez	Strength and conditioning coordinator	1st

== Schedule ==
Date	Time	Opponent	Site	TV	Result	Attendance
September 1	12:30 p.m.	Elon*	Kenan Memorial Stadium; Chapel Hill, NC	ACCN	W 62–0	50,500
September 8	3:00 p.m.	at Wake Forest	BB&T Field; Winston-Salem, NC (rivalry)	ACCRSN	L 27–28	29,526
September 15	3:30 p.m.	at No. 19 Louisville*	Papa John's Cardinal Stadium; Louisville, KY	ABC/ESPN2	L 34–39	53,334
September 22	3:30 p.m.	East Carolina*	Kenan Memorial Stadium; Chapel Hill, NC	ESPNU	W 27–6	59,500
September 29	3:30 p.m.	Idaho*	Kenan Memorial Stadium; Chapel Hill, NC	ACCRSN	W 66–0	32,000
October 6	12:30 p.m.	Virginia Tech	Kenan Memorial Stadium; Chapel Hill, NC	ACCN	W 48–34	54,000
October 13	2:30 p.m.	at Miami (FL)	Sun Life Stadium; Miami Gardens, FL	ESPNU	W 18–14	58,954
October 20	7:00 p.m.	at Duke	Wallace Wade Stadium; Durham, NC (Victory Bell)	ESPNU	L 30–33	33,941
October 27	12:30 p.m.	North Carolina State	Kenan Memorial Stadium; Chapel Hill, NC (rivalry)	ACCN	W 43–35	62,000
November 10	12:30 p.m.	Georgia Tech^{†}	Kenan Memorial Stadium; Chapel Hill, NC	ACCN	L 50–68	50,000
November 15	7:30 p.m.	at Virginia	Scott Stadium; Charlottesville, VA (South's Oldest Rivalry)	ESPN	W 37–13	45,760
November 24	3:00 p.m.	Maryland	Kenan Memorial Stadium; Chapel Hill, NC	ACCRSN	W 45–38	44,000
*Non-conference game; ^{†}Homecoming; Rankings from AP Poll released prior to the game; All times are in Eastern time

== Game summaries ==
=== Elon ===
Week 1: Elon Phoenix

Quarter	1	2	3	4	Total
Phoenix	0	0	0	0	0
Tar Heels	14	21	27	0	62

at Kenan Memorial Stadium

- Date: September 1, 2012
- Game time: 12:30 pm
- Game weather: 89 °F (32 °C), sunny
- Game attendance: 50,500
- Referee: David Epperley
- TV announcers (ACC Network): Steve Martin, Dave Archer, Mike Hogewood

Game information

First quarter

- UNC – Giovani Bernard 59 yd run (Casey Barth kick)
- UNC – Giovani Bernard 6 yd pass from Bryn Renner (Casey Barth kick)

Second quarter

- UNC – Casey Barth 21 yd field goal
- UNC – Giovani Bernard 70 yd punt return (Casey Barth kick)
- UNC – Jheranie Boyd 35 yd pass from Bryn Renner (Casey Barth kick)
- UNC – Casey Barth 32 yd field goal
- UNC – A.J. Blue 1 yd run (Casey Barth kick)

Third quarter

- UNC – Jack Tabb 23 yd pass from Bryn Renner (Casey Barth kick)
- UNC – Marquise Williams 3 yd run (Casey Barth kick)
- UNC – A.J. Blue 4 yd run (Casey Barth kick)

Fourth quarter

- no scoring

Top Passing

- UNC – Bryn Renner – 14/21, 236 yds, 3 TD, 1 INT
- Elon – Thomas Wilson – 13/27, 99 yds, 0 TD, 2 INT

Top Rushing

- UNC – Giovani Bernard – 93 yds, 1 TD
- Elon – Thuc Phan – 19 yds, 0 TD

Top Receiving

- UNC – Eric Ebron – 53 yds, 0 TD
- Elon – Kierre Brown – 31 yds, 0 TD

North Carolina started a new era under head coach Larry Fedora with the first shutout since beating Duke 38–0 to finish the 1999 season. The last time UNC scored 62 points was in the 1995 season against Ohio, which is only 3 points shy of the school record. Giovani Bernard scored 3 touchdowns (one rushing, one receiving, and one punt return), all before sitting out the entire second half of the game. Carolina also completed passes to 14 different receivers, including one reception by quarterback Bryn Renner. The Tar Heels also set a school and ACC record with 260 punt return yards during the game.

=== Wake Forest ===
Week 2: Wake Forest Demon Deacons

Quarter	1	2	3	4	Total
Tar Heels	7	7	10	3	27
Demon Deacons	7	14	0	7	28

at Groves Stadium

- Date: September 8, 2012
- Game time: 3:00 pm
- Game weather: 71 °F (22 °C), rainy then overcast
- Game attendance: 29,526
- Referee: Gary Patterson
- TV announcers (ACC Network): Paul Kennedy, Keith Jones, Jenn Hildreth

Game information

First quarter

- UNC – Eric Ebron 6 yd pass from Bryn Renner (Casey Barth kick)
- WF – Tanner Price 2 yd run (Jimmy Newman kick)

Second quarter

- UNC – A.J. Blue 1 yd run (Casey Barth kick)
- WF – Deandre Martin 4 yd run (Jimmy Newman kick)
- WF – Josh Harris 6 yd run (Jimmy Newman kick)

Third quarter

- UNC – Romar Morris 4 yd run (Casey Barth kick)
- UNC – Casey Barth 25 yd field goal

Fourth quarter

- UNC – Casey Barth 30 yd field goal
- WF – Tanner Price 1 yd run (Jimmy Newman kick)

Top Passing

- UNC – Bryn Renner – 23/39, 271 yds, 1 TD, 1 INT
- WF – Tanner Price – 27/38, 327 yds, 0 TD, 1 INT

Top Rushing

- UNC – A.J. Blue – 106 yds, 1 TD
- WF – Josh Harris – 40 yds, 1 TD

Top Receiving

- UNC – Erik Highsmith – 71 yds, 0 TD
- WF – Michael Campanaro, 164 yds, 0 TD

=== Louisville ===
Week 3: Louisville Cardinals

Quarter	1	2	3	4	Total
Tar Heels	0	7	7	20	34
Cardinals	15	21	0	3	39

at Papa John's Cardinal Stadium

- Date: September 15, 2012
- Game time: 3:30 pm
- Game weather: 76 °F (24 °C), partly cloudy
- Game attendance: 53,334
- Referee: B. Allen
- TV announcers (ESPN2/ABC): Bob Wischusen, Danny Kanell, Maria Taylor

Game information

First quarter

- LOU – Senorise Perry 13 yd Run (Two-Point Pass Conversion Failed)
- LOU – Charles Gaines 32 yd Pass From Teddy Bridgewater (Two-Point Pass Conversion Failed)
- LOU – John Wallace 22 yd field goal

Second quarter

- LOU – Eli Rogers 15 yd Pass From Teddy Bridgewater (John Wallace Kick)
- LOU – Jeremy Wright 12 yd Run (John Wallace Kick)
- UNC – Romar Morris 44 yd Pass From Bryn Renner (Casey Barth Kick)
- LOU – Nick Heuser 4 yd Pass From Teddy Bridgewater (John Wallace Kick)

Third quarter

- UNC – Eric Ebron 2 yd Pass From Bryn Renner (Casey Barth Kick)

Fourth quarter

- LOU – John Wallace 43 yd field goal
- UNC – Erik Highsmith 9 yd Pass From Bryn Renner (Casey Barth Kick)
- UNC – Eric Ebron 5 yd Pass From Bryn Renner (Casey Barth Kick)
- UNC – Romar Morris 50 yd Pass From Bryn Renner (Two-Point Pass Conversion Failed)

Top Passing

- UNC – Bryn Renner – 26–41, 363 yds, 5 TD, 1 INT
- LOU – Teddy Bridgewater – 23–28, 279 yds, 3 TD, 0 INT

Top Rushing

- UNC – A.J. Blue – 43 yds, 0 TD
- LOU – Jeremy Wright – 114 yds, 1 TD

Top Receiving

- UNC – Romar Morris – 149 yds, 2 TD
- LOU – Charles Gaines – 78 yds, 1 TD

=== East Carolina ===
Week 4: East Carolina Pirates

Quarter	1	2	3	4	Total
Pirates	0	6	0	0	6
Tar Heels	7	3	14	3	27

at Kenan Stadium

- Date: September 22, 2012
- Game time: 3:30 pm
- Game weather: 83 °F (28 °C), sunny
- Game attendance: 59,500
- Referee: Brad Roger
- TV announcers (ESPNU): Anish Shroff, Dan Hawkins

Game information

First quarter

- UNC – Giovani Bernard 14 yd Pass From Bryn Renner (Casey Barth Kick)

Second quarter

- ECU – Warren Harvey 22 yd field goal
- UNC – Casey Barth 20 yd field goal
- ECU – Warren Harvey 26 yd field goal

Third quarter

- UNC – Sean Tapley 62 yd Pass From Bryn Renner (Casey Barth Kick)
- UNC – Giovani Bernard 4 yd Run (Casey Barth Kick)

Fourth quarter

- UNC – Casey Barth 41 yd field goal

Top Passing

- UNC – Bryn Renner – 27–43, 321 yds, 2 TD, 0 INT
- ECU – Shane Carden – 17–30, 124 yds, 0 TD, 0 INT

Top Rushing

- UNC – Giovani Bernard – 50 yds, 1 TD
- ECU – Vintavious Cooper – 68 yds, 0 TD

Top Receiving

- UNC – Erik Highsmith – 66 yds, 0 TD
- ECU – Justin Jones – 46 yds, 0 TD

=== Idaho ===
Week 5: Idaho Vandals

Quarter	1	2	3	4	Total
Vandals	0	0	0	0	0
Tar Heels	28	17	14	7	66

at Kenan Stadium

- Date: September 29, 2012
- Game time: 3:30 pm
- Game weather: 61 °F (16 °C), light rain
- Game attendance: 32,000
- Referee: Walt Davenport
- TV announcers (ACC Network): Paul Kennedy, Keith Jones, Jenn Hildreth

Game information

First quarter

- UNC – Sean Tapley 36 yd pass from Bryn Renner (Casey Barth kick)
- UNC – Erik Highsmith fumble recovery in End Zone (Casey Barth kick)
- UNC – Giovani Bernard 2 yd run (Casey Barth kick)
- UNC – Quinshad Davis 35 yd pass from Bryn Renner (Casey Barth kick)

Second quarter

- UNC – Giovani Bernard 68 yd run (Casey Barth kick)
- UNC – Casey Barth 33 yd field goal
- UNC – A.J. Blue 3 yd run (Casey Barth kick)

Third quarter

- UNC – Quinshad Davis 35 yd pass from Marquise Williams (Casey Barth kick)
- UNC – Marquise Williams 1 yd run (Casey Barth kick)

Fourth quarter

- UNC – Marquise Williams 4 yd run (Casey Barth kick)

Top Passing

- UNC – Bryn Renner – 14–19, 231 yds, 3 TD, 1 INT
- IDHO – Dominique Blackman – 19–35, 109 yds, 0 TD, 4 INT

Top Rushing

- UNC – Romar Morris – 74 yds, 0 TD
- IDHO – James Baker – 44 yds, 0 TD

Top Receiving

- UNC – Quinshad Davis – 89 yds, 2 TD
- IDHO – Mike Scott – 38 yds, 0 TD

=== Virginia Tech ===
Week 6: Virginia Tech Hokies

Quarter	1	2	3	4	Total
Hokies	14	6	6	8	34
Tar Heels	14	14	17	3	48

at Kenan Stadium

- Date: October 6, 2012
- Game time: 12:30 pm
- Game weather: 78 °F (26 °C), sunny
- Game attendance: 54,000
- Referee: Jim Hyson
- TV announcers (ACCN): Steve Martin, Dave Archer, Scott Pryzwansky

Game information

First quarter

- VT – Logan Thomas 13 yd run (Cody Journell kick)
- UNC – Sean Tapley 94 yd kickoff return (Casey Barth kick)
- UNC – Bryn Renner 4 yd run (Casey Barth kick)
- VT – Marcus Davis 49 yd pass from Logan Thomas (Cody Journell kick)

Second quarter

- UNC – Giovani Bernard 62 yd run (Casey Barth kick)
- VT – Cody Journell 40 yd field goal
- UNC – A.J. Blue 1 yd run (Casey Barth kick)
- VT – Cody Journell 35 yd field goal

Third quarter

- UNC – Sean Tapley 19 yd pass from Bryn Renner (Casey Barth kick)
- VT – Demitri Knowles 93 yd kickoff return (two-point conversion failed)
- UNC – Casey Barth 44 yd field goal
- UNC – A.J. Blue 13 yd run (Casey Barth kick)

Fourth quarter

- VT – Corey Fuller 66 yd pass from Logan Thomas (Logan Thomas pass to Corey Fuller for two-point conversion)
- UNC – Casey Barth 40 yd field goal

Top Passing

- UNC – Bryn Renner – 17–30, 194 yds, 1 TD, 0 INT
- VT – Logan Thomas – 26–49, 354 yds, 2 TD, 1 INT

Top Rushing

- UNC – Giovani Bernard – 262 yds, 1 TD
- VT – Logan Thomas – 20 yds, 1 TD

Top Receiving

- UNC – Quinshad Davis – 65 yds, 0 TD
- VT – Corey Fuller – 143 yds, 1 TD

=== Miami (FL) ===
Week 7: Miami Hurricanes

Quarter	1	2	3	4	Total
Tar Heels	7	8	3	0	18
Hurricanes	0	7	7	0	14

at Sun Life Stadium

- Date: October 13, 2011
- Game time: 2:30 pm
- Game weather: 84 °F (29 °C), partly cloudy
- Game attendance: 58,954
- Referee: J. Magallanes
- TV announcers (ESPNU): Anish Shroff, Dan Hawkins

Game information

First quarter

- UNC – Giovani Bernard 10 yd run (Casey Barth kick)

Second quarter

- MIA – Mike James 1 yd run (Jake Wieclaw kick)
- UNC – Giovani Bernard 17 yd run (Thomas Hibbard pass to Eric Ebron for two-point conversion)

Third quarter

- MIA – Stephen Morris 5 yd run (Jake Wieclaw kick)
- UNC – Casey Barth 48 yd field goal

Fourth quarter

- no scoring

Top Passing

- UNC – Bryn Renner – 25–40, 214 yds, 0 TD, 1 INT
- MIA – Stephen Morris – 12–26, 155 yds, 0 TD, 2 INT

Top Rushing

- UNC – Giovani Bernard – 177 yds, 2 TD
- MIA – Mike James – 96 yds, 1 TD

Top Receiving

- UNC – Eric Ebron – 87 yds, 0 TD
- MIA – Rashawn Scott – 72 yds, 0 TD

=== Duke ===
Week 8: Duke Blue Devils

Quarter	1	2	3	4	Total
Tar Heels	3	3	3	21	30
Blue Devils	10	10	3	10	33

at Wallace Wade Stadium

- Date: October 20, 2012
- Game time: 7:00 pm
- Game weather: 62 °F (17 °C), clear
- Game attendance: 33,941
- Referee: Jeff Heaser
- TV announcers (ESPNU): Clay Matvick, Matt Stinchcomb, Allison Williams

Game information

First quarter

- UNC – Casey Barth 30 yd field goal
- DUKE – Anthony Boone 2 yd run (Ross Martin kick)
- DUKE – Ross Martin 28 yd field goal

Second quarter

- DUKE – Ross Martin 30 yd field goal
- UNC – Casey Barth 23 yd field goal
- DUKE – Jela Duncan 2 yd run (Ross Martin kick)

Third quarter

- UNC – Casey Barth 28 yd field goal
- DUKE – Ross Martin 20 yd field goal

Fourth quarter

- UNC – Giovani Bernard 1 yd run (Casey Barth kick)
- DUKE – Ross Martin 43 yd field goal
- UNC – Sean Tapley 5 yd pass from Bryn Renner (Casey Barth kick)
- UNC – Giovani Bernard 4 yd pass from Bryn Renner (Casey Barth kick)
- DUKE – Jamison Crowder 5 yd pass from Sean Renfree (Ross Martin kick)

Top Passing

- UNC – Bryn Renner – 19–32, 198 yds, 2 TD, 0 INT
- DUKE – Sean Renfree – 23–36, 276 yds, 1 TD, 1 INT

Top Rushing

- UNC – Giovani Bernard – 143 yds, 1 TD
- DUKE – Josh Snead – 99 yds, 0 TD

Top Receiving

- UNC – Eric Ebron – 68 yds, 0 TD
- DUKE – Conner Vernon – 124 yds, 0 TD

=== NC State ===
Week 9: NC State Wolfpack

Quarter	1	2	3	4	Total
Wolfpack	14	14	7	0	35
Tar Heels	25	0	0	18	43

at Kenan Stadium

- Date: October 27, 2012
- Game time: 12:30 pm
- Game weather: 65 °F (18 °C), mostly cloudy
- Game attendance: 62,000
- Referee: Ron Cherry
- TV announcers (ACC Network): Tim Brant, Dave Archer, Mike Hogewood

Game information

First quarter

- UNC – Giovani Bernard 8 yd run (Casey Barth kick)
- UNC – Erik Highsmith 45 yd run (Thomas Hibbard pass to Jack Tabb for two-point conversion)
- NCSU – Charlie Hegedus 32 yd pass from Mike Glennon (Niklas Sade kick)
- UNC – Casey Barth 45 yd field goal
- UNC – Giovani Bernard 1 yd run (Casey Barth kick)
- NCSU – Rashard Smith 30 yd pass from Mike Glennon (Niklas Sade kick)

Second quarter

- NCSU – Bryan Underwood 20 yd pass from Mike Glennon (Niklas Sade kick)
- NCSU – Tobais Palmer 83 yd pass from Mike Glennon (Niklas Sade kick)

Third quarter

- NCSU – Bryan Underwood 55 yd pass from Mike Glennon (Niklas Sade kick)

Fourth quarter

- UNC – Sean Tapley 3 yd pass from Bryn Renner (Casey Barth kick)
- UNC – Casey Barth 34 yd field goal
- UNC – Giovani Bernard 74 yd punt return (Thomas Hibbard pass to Jack Tabb for two-point conversion)

Top Passing

- UNC – Bryn Renner – 30–47, 358 yds, 1 TD, 1 INT
- NCSU – Mike Glennon – 29–52, 467 yds, 5 TD, 2 INT

Top Rushing

- UNC – Giovani Bernard – 135 yds, 2 TD
- NCSU – Tony Creecy – 66 yds, 0 TD

Top Receiving

- UNC – Giovani Bernard – 95 yds, 0 TD
- NCSU – Tobais Palmer – 119 yds, 1 TD

=== Georgia Tech ===
Week 10: Georgia Tech Yellow Jackets

Quarter	1	2	3	4	Total
Yellow Jackets	14	14	30	10	68
Tar Heels	14	15	14	7	50

at Kenan Stadium

- Date: November 10, 2012
- Game time: 12:30 pm
- Game weather: 69 °F (21 °C), sunny
- Game attendance: 50,000
- Referee: Brad Allen
- TV announcers (ACC Network): Tim Brant, Dave Archer, Mike Hogewood

Game information

First quarter

- UNC – Giovani Bernard 4 yd run (Casey Barth kick)
- GT – Tevin Washington 25 yd run (Chris Tanner kick)
- UNC – A.J. Blue 1 yd run (Casey Barth kick)
- GT – Vad Lee 1 yd run (Chris Tanner kick)

Second quarter

- GT – David Sims 11 yd run (Chris Tanner kick)
- UNC – Romar Morris 30 yd run (Casey Barth kick)
- GT – Vad Lee 1 yd run (Chris Tanner kick)
- UNC – A.J. Blue 5 yd run (Thomas Hibbard pass to Jack Tabb for two-point conversion)

Third quarter

- GT – Jamal Golden 100 yd kickoff return (two-point pass conversion failed)
- UNC – Giovani Bernard 78 yd pass from Bryn Renner (Casey Barth kick)
- GT – Robert Godhigh 4 yd run (Chris Tanner kick)
- GT – Chris Tanner 35 yd field goal
- GT – Robert Godhigh 27 yd run (Chris Tanner kick)
- GT – Robert Godhigh 32 yd pass from Vad Lee (Chris Tanner kick)
- UNC – Quinshad Davis 11 yd pass from Bryn Renner (Thomas Moore kick)

Fourth quarter

- UNC – Tim Scott 34 yd interception return (Thomas Moore kick)
- GT – Orwin Smith 22 yd run (Chris Tanner kick)
- GT – Chris Tanner 34 yd field goal

Top Passing

- UNC – Bryn Renner – 24–35, 350 yds, 2 TD, 1 INT
- GT – Vad Lee – 6–10, 169 yds, 1 TD, 1 INT

Top Rushing

- UNC – Giovani Bernard – 78 yds, 1 TD
- GT – Vad Lee – 112 yds, 2 TD

Top Receiving

- UNC – Quinshad Davis – 104 yds, 1 TD
- GT – Darren Waller – 63 yds, 0 TD

=== Virginia ===
Week 11: Virginia Cavaliers

Quarter	1	2	3	4	Total
Tar Heels	7	13	0	17	37
Cavaliers	3	7	3	0	13

at Scott Stadium

- Date: November 15, 2012
- Game time: 7:30 pm
- Game weather: 41 °F (5 °C), Partly cloudy
- Game attendance: 45,760
- Referee: Jeff Flanagan
- TV announcers (ESPN): Rece Davis, Jesse Palmer, David Pollack, Samantha Ponder

Game information

First quarter

- UNC – Erik Highsmith 9 yd pass from Bryn Renner (Thomas Moore kick)
- UVA – Drew Jarrett 34 yd field goal

Second quarter

- UNC – A.J. Blue 3 yd run (Thomas Moore kick)
- UVA – Darius Jennings 9 yd pass from Phillip Sims (Drew Jarrett kick)
- UNC – Tre Boston 36 yd interception return (two-point run conversion failed)

Third quarter

- UVA – Drew Jarrett 28 yd field goal

Fourth quarter

- UNC – Giovani Bernard 23 yd pass from Bryn Renner (Thomas Moore kick)
- UNC – Erik Highsmith 20 yd pass from Bryn Renner (Thomas Moore kick)
- UNC – Thomas Moore 30 yd field goal

Top Passing

- UNC – Bryn Renner – 29–36, 315 yds, 3 TD, 0 INT
- UVA – Michael Rocco – 11–16, 155 yds, 0 TD, 1 INT

Top Rushing

- UNC – Giovani Bernard – 57 yds, 0 TD
- UVA – Kevin Parks – 53 yds, 0 TD

Top Receiving

- UNC – Quinshad Davis – 178 yds, 0 TD
- UVA – Dominique Terrell – 79 yds, 0 TD

== NFL draft ==
Round	Pick	Player	Position	NFL Team
1	7	Jonathan Cooper	G	Arizona Cardinals
1	28	Sylvester Williams	DT	Denver Broncos
2	37	Giovani Bernard	RB	Cincinnati Bengals
3	89	Brennan Williams	T	Houston Texans
7	214	Travis Bond	G	Minnesota Vikings
