= John Jancek =

American football coach (born 1968)

Current position
- Title: Outside Linebackers Coach
- Team: Colorado State
- Conference: MW

Biographical details
- Born: April 1, 1968 (age 58); Muskegon, Michigan, U.S.

Playing career
- 1986–1990: Grand Valley State
- Position: Defensive lineman

Coaching career (HC unless noted)
- 1991: Grand Valley State (GA)
- 1992–1994: Wayne State (DC)
- 1996–1998: Hillsdale (DC)
- 1999–2002: Grand Valley State (DC)
- 2002–2004: Central Michigan (DL)
- 2005–2008: Georgia (LB)
- 2009: Georgia (co-DC)
- 2010–2011: Cincinnati (Co-DC)
- 2012: Cincinnati (DC)
- 2013–2015: Tennessee (DC)
- 2016: South Florida (Safeties)
- 2017: Kentucky (consultant)
- 2018–2019: Colorado State (DC)
- 2020–2021: Georgia (DQC)
- 2022: LSU (Analyst)
- 2023: LSU (STC/OLB)
- 2025–present: Colorado State (OLB)

Accomplishments and honors

Championships
- 1 National (2021)

John Jancek (born April 1, 1968) is an American college football coach and former defensive lineman. He is married to his wife Kelly Jancek. Jancek has four sons Brady, Jack, Brock, and Zac.

== Playing career ==
Jancek was a defensive lineman for the Grand Valley State Lakers from 1988 through 1990.

== Coaching career ==
Jancek started his coaching career after his playing days ended following the 1990 season. In 1991, he stayed at Grand Valley State as a graduate assistant. In 1992, he left for Wayne State in Detroit, Michigan to be their defensive coordinator. He remained at Wayne State until 1994, when he left for Hillsdale College to take on the same role. In 1999, he returned to Grand Valley State to be their defensive coordinator. He left for Central Michigan in 2002 to be their defensive line coach. In 2005, he joined the Georgia Bulldogs coaching staff as the linebackers coach. In 2009, he was promoted to co-defensive coordinator. In 2010, he left for the same role at Cincinnati. In 2012, he became the sole defensive coordinator for the Bearcats. In 2013, he returned to the SEC, this time as the Tennessee defensive coordinator, where he stayed until the 2015 season. He left for South Florida in 2016, where he was the safeties coach. In 2017, he joined the Kentucky Wildcats as a defensive consultant. In 2018, he was named as the Colorado State Rams' defensive coordinator. Following the last game of the 2019 season, Bobo left the head coach position at CSU and Steve Addazio was hired to be the new head coach of CSU, leaving Jancek and his position in question. In 2020, Jancek was brought on as a defensive quality control coach for Kirby Smart and the Georgia Bulldogs football program. Jancek was part of the Bulldogs' staff that won the National Championship in the 2021 season over Alabama

== Personal life ==
Jancek and his wife, Kelly, have four sons, Zac, Brock, Jack, and Brady. Zac currently is an Area Practice Consultant for Cartessa Aesthetics. Jack currently is an assistant wide receivers coach for the Tennessee Volunteers football team.
