= 2012 Rutgers Scarlet Knights football team =

American college football season

2012 Rutgers Scarlet Knights football

Big East co-champion

Russell Athletic Bowl, L 10–13^{OT} vs. Virginia Tech
- Conference: Big East Conference
- Record: 9–4 (5–2 Big East)
- Head coach: Kyle Flood (1st season)
- Offensive coordinator: Dave Brock (1st season)
- Offensive scheme: Pro spread
- Defensive coordinator: Robb Smith (1st season)
- Base defense: 4–3
- Home stadium: High Point Solutions Stadium

2012 Big East Conference football standings
	Conf.			Overall
Team	W		L	W		L
No. 13 Louisville $+	5	–	2	11	–	2
Cincinnati +	5	–	2	10	–	3
Rutgers +	5	–	2	9	–	4
Syracuse +	5	–	2	8	–	5
Pittsburgh	3	–	4	6	–	7
Connecticut	2	–	5	5	–	7
Temple	2	–	5	4	–	7
South Florida	1	–	6	3	–	9
$ – BCS representative as conference champion; + – Conference co-champions; Rankings from AP Poll

The 2012 Rutgers Scarlet Knights football team represented Rutgers University in the 2012 NCAA Division I FBS football season. The Scarlet Knights played their home games at High Point Solutions Stadium in Piscataway, New Jersey as a member of the Big East Conference. This was the first season with Kyle Flood as the head coach, as former head coach Greg Schiano accepted the head coaching position for the Tampa Bay Buccaneers. Rutgers finished the season 9–4, 5–2 in Big East play to win the school's first ever Big East Conference football championship, sharing the conference title with Cincinnati, Louisville, and Syracuse. Rutgers played in the Russell Athletic Bowl against Virginia Tech losing in overtime 13-10.

As of 2026, this is Rutgers' last season that they were ranked nationally in the AP Poll.

== Schedule ==
Date	Time	Opponent	Rank	Site	TV	Result	Attendance
September 1	8:00 pm	at Tulane*		Mercedes-Benz Superdome; New Orleans, LA	CBSSN	W 24–12	26,059
September 8	3:30 pm	Howard*		High Point Solutions Stadium; Piscataway, NJ	SNY	W 26–0	50,855
September 13	7:30 pm	at South Florida		Raymond James Stadium; Tampa, FL	ESPN	W 23–13	44,219
September 22	7:00 pm	at Arkansas*		Donald W. Reynolds Razorback Stadium; Fayetteville, AR	ESPNU	W 35–26	72,543
October 6	12:00 pm	Connecticut	No. 22	High Point Solutions Stadium; Piscataway, NJ	ESPNU	W 19–3	50,870
October 13	12:00 pm	Syracuse	No. 20	High Point Solutions Stadium; Piscataway, NJ	Big East Network	W 23–15	48,011
October 20	12:00 pm	at Temple	No. 19	Lincoln Financial Field; Philadelphia, PA	Big East Network	W 35–10	35,145
October 27	3:30 pm	Kent State*^{†}	No. 18	High Point Solutions Stadium; Piscataway, NJ	SNY	L 23–35	49,345
November 10	12:00 pm	Army*	No. 24	High Point Solutions Stadium; Piscataway, NJ	ESPNU	W 28–7	43,250
November 17	12:00 pm	at Cincinnati	No. 22	Nippert Stadium; Cincinnati, OH	Big East Network	W 10–3	34,526
November 24	12:00 pm	at Pittsburgh	No. 22	Heinz Field; Pittsburgh, PA	ESPN2	L 6–27	38,786
November 29	7:30 pm	Louisville		High Point Solutions Stadium; Piscataway, NJ	ESPN	L 17–20	52,798
December 28	5:30 pm	vs. Virginia Tech*		Florida Citrus Bowl Stadium; Orlando, FL (Russell Athletic Bowl)	ESPN	L 10–13 ^{OT}	48,127
*Non-conference game; ^{†}Homecoming; Rankings from AP Poll released prior to the game; All times are in Eastern time

== Rankings ==
Ranking movements Legend: ██ Increase in ranking ██ Decrease in ranking — = Not ranked RV = Received votes т = Tied with team above or below
	Week															
Poll	Pre	1	2	3	4	5	6	7	8	9	10	11	12	13	14	Final
AP	—	—	—	RV	23	22	20	19	18	RV	24	22	21	RV	RV	—
Coaches	RV	RV	RV	RV	25 т	21	19	17	15	25	20	20	19	25	RV	RV
Harris	Not released						19	17	15	23	22	21	19	RV	RV	Not released
BCS	Not released							15	15	—	23	22	18	—	—	Not released

== Game summaries ==
=== At Tulane ===
	1	2	3	4	Total
Scarlet Knights	0	10	0	14	24
Green Wave	0	3	0	9	12

=== Howard ===
	1	2	3	4	Total
Bison	0	0	0	0	0
Scarlet Knights	7	12	7	0	26

=== At South Florida ===
	1	2	3	4	Total
Scarlet Knights	0	3	10	10	23
Bulls	6	0	0	7	13

=== At Arkansas ===
	1	2	3	4	Total
Scarlet Knights	0	14	14	7	35
Razorbacks	10	0	3	13	26

=== Connecticut ===
	1	2	3	4	Total
Huskies	0	3	0	0	3
No. 22 Scarlet Knights	6	0	7	6	19

=== Syracuse ===
	1	2	3	4	Total
Orange	0	7	0	8	15
No. 20 Scarlet Knights	7	0	10	6	23

=== At Temple ===
	1	2	3	4	Total
No. 19 Scarlet Knights	0	0	21	14	35
Owls	7	3	0	0	10

=== Kent State ===
	1	2	3	4	Total
Golden Flashes	7	14	7	7	35
No. 18 Scarlet Knights	3	7	7	6	23

=== Army ===
	1	2	3	4	Total
Black Knights	7	0	0	0	7
No. 24 Scarlet Knights	0	7	0	21	28

=== At Cincinnati ===
	1	2	3	4	Total
No. 22 Scarlet Knights	0	7	0	3	10
Bearcats	0	0	0	3	3

=== At Pittsburgh ===
	1	2	3	4	Total
No. 22 Scarlet Knights	0	0	6	0	6
Panthers	0	21	3	3	27

=== Louisville ===
	1	2	3	4	Total
Cardinals	0	3	14	3	20
Scarlet Knights	7	7	0	3	17

=== Vs. Virginia Tech (Russell Athletic Bowl) ===
	1	2	3	4	OT	Total
Scarlet Knights	10	0	0	0	0	10
Hokies	0	0	0	10	3	13
