= 2012 Syracuse Orange football team =

American college football season

2012 Syracuse Orange football

Big East co-champion Pinstripe Bowl champion

Pinstripe Bowl, W 38–14 vs. West Virginia
- Conference: Big East Conference
- Record: 8–5 (5–2 Big East)
- Head coach: Doug Marrone (4th season)
- Offensive coordinator: Nathaniel Hackett (2nd season)
- Offensive scheme: Pro-style
- Defensive coordinator: Scott Shafer (4th season)
- Base defense: 4–3
- Home stadium: Carrier Dome

2012 Big East Conference football standings
	Conf.			Overall
Team	W		L	W		L
No. 13 Louisville $+	5	–	2	11	–	2
Cincinnati +	5	–	2	10	–	3
Rutgers +	5	–	2	9	–	4
Syracuse +	5	–	2	8	–	5
Pittsburgh	3	–	4	6	–	7
Connecticut	2	–	5	5	–	7
Temple	2	–	5	4	–	7
South Florida	1	–	6	3	–	9
$ – BCS representative as conference champion; + – Conference co-champions; Rankings from AP Poll

The 2012 Syracuse Orange football team represented Syracuse University in the 2012 NCAA Division I FBS football season. The Orange were led by fourth year head coach Doug Marrone and played their home games at the Carrier Dome. The season marked their last as members of the Big East Conference, as they joined the Atlantic Coast Conference in 2013. They finished the season 8–5, 5–2 in Big East play to claim a four-way share of the Big East Conference championship. They were invited to the Pinstripe Bowl where they defeated long-time rival West Virginia, whom they did not play in the regular season due to the Mountaineers' move to the Big 12 Conference. The 2012 season also proved to be the final one for Marrone as the Orange head coach, as he was hired as the new head coach of the NFL's Buffalo Bills shortly after the end of the season.

== Preseason ==
The Orange finished the 2011 season with a 5–7 record, going 1–6 in Big East play to finish in a tie for seventh place. The 2012 recruiting class added 21 new players to the roster, including 13 three-star players. Rivals.com ranked the 2012 Syracuse recruiting class at number 65 in the nation.

On offense, the Orange are returning senior quarterback Ryan Nassib, starting for his third consecutive season. Key offensive players such as Alec Lemon, Marcus Sales, Jerome Smith, and Prince-Tyson Gulley are also returning. On defense, key players returning include Shamarko Thomas, Marquis Spruill, and Deon Goggins. The program lost a number of significant contributors in the 2011 campaign, including tight end Nick Provo and defensive end Chandler Jones, and such losses left a number of questions regarding how a relatively young defense would be able to mature without many experienced players.

In its preseason rankings, College Football News ranked the Orange 57th in the country, and projected that they would go 6–6 in 2012. Their 2012 schedule is the 42nd-toughest in the nation, according to rankings compiled by statistician Jeff Sagarin.

=== Big East media poll ===
The 2012 Big East Preseason Poll was announced at the Big East Media Day in Newport, RI on July 31, 2012. Syracuse was chosen to finish seventh in the conference.

1. Louisville – 219 (24)
2. South Florida – 176 (4)
3. Rutgers – 155
4. Cincinnati – 139
5. Pittsburgh – 131
6. Connecticut – 77
7. Syracuse – 70
8. Temple – 41

== Personnel ==
=== Coaching staff ===
2012 Coaching staff
Head coach: Doug Marrone; Offensive coaches: Greg Adkins – Offensive line/recruiting coordinator; Nathaniel Hackett – Offensive coordinator/quarterbacks/tight ends; Rob Moore – Wide receivers; Tyrone Wheatley – Running backs; Defensive coaches: John anselmo – Assistant head coach/linebackers; Tim daoust – Defensive line; Donnie Henderson – Defensive backs; Steve Morrison – Linebackers; Jason Rebrovich – Defensive quality control coach; Scott Shafer – Defensive coordinator; Support staff: Bob Brotzki – Assistant athletics director for player development; William hicks – Assistant athletics director for athletic performance; Hal luther – Director of strength and conditioning; Kevin van derzee – Director of football operations

=== Roster ===
2012 Syracuse Orange Football
Quarterback: 10 Terrel Hunt – sophomore; 12 Ryan Nassib – senior; 14 John Kinder – junior; 17 Charley Loeb – senior; Running back: 1 Ashton Broyld – freshman; 20 Mitchell Piasecki – sophomore (FB); 20 Greg Tobias – junior; 23 Prince-Tyson Gulley – junior; 26 Myles Davis – freshman (FB); 27 George Morris III – freshman; 29 Devante McFarlane – freshman; 30 Steve Rene – junior; 31 Clay Cleveland – junior (FB); 32 Travon Burke – sophomore; 34 Adonis Ameen-Moore – sophomore; 45 Jerome Smith – junior; Offensive lineman: 55 Rob Trudo – OG – sophomore; 57 Omari Palmer – OG – freshman; 59 Mackey MacPherson – C – junior; 60 Sean Hickey – OT – junior; 62 Andrew Phillips – OT – senior; 64 Daniel Anyaegbunam – OT – junior; 67 Justin Pugh – OT – senior; 68 Nick Robinson – OT – sophomore; 70 Jesse Wolf-Gould – OG – sophomore; 72 Ivan Foy – OG – sophomore; 74 Seamus Shanley – C – freshman; 75 Zack Chibane – OG – senior; 76 Kyle Knapp – OT – freshman; 77 Lou Alexander – OT – senior; 78 Jason Emerich – C – freshman; Wide receiver: 2 Quinta Funderburk – sophomore; 5 Marcus Sales – (redshirt) senior; 15 Alec Lemon – senior; 16 Keenan Hale – sophomore; 22 Adrian Flemming – junior; 25 Jeremiah Kobena – sophomore; 36 Christopher Clark – junior; 82 Alvin Cornelius – freshman; 84 Ben Lewish – freshman; 87 Kyle Foster – sophomore; 88 Jarrod West – junior; 97 Macauley Hill – sophomore	Tight end: 42 Jacob Green – freshman; 48 Carl Cutler – (redshirt) senior; 80 Ron Thompson – freshman; 81 Louie Addazio – sophomore; 83 Max Beaulieu – junior; 85 Beckett Wales – junior; 86 David Stevens – (redshirt) senior; 89 Josh Parris – freshman; Defensive tackle: 13 Deon Goggins – (redshirt) senior; 53 Lucas Albrecht – sophomore; 63 Ryan Sloan – sophomore; 92 Davon Walls – junior; 96 Jay Bromley – junior; 99 Zian Jones – junior; Defensive end: 10 Markus Pierce-Brewster – junior; 51 Donnie Simmons – sophomore; 91 Brandon Sharpe – senior; 93 Micah Robinson – junior; 94 Robert Welsh – junior; 95 Josh Manley – freshman; 97 John Raymon – freshman; Linebacker: 7 Oliver Vigille – sophomore; 11 Marquis Spruill – junior; 18 Siriki Diabate – senior; 33 Dan Vaughan – senior; 35 Dyshawn Davis – sophomore; 38 Cameron Lynch – sophomore; 39 Don Anene – senior; 40 Zachary McCarrell – junior; 41 Lewellyn Coker – junior; 50 Femi Aliyu – junior; 90 James Washington – freshman	Cornerback: 2 Wayne Morgan – freshman; 4 Brandon Reddish – sophomore; 8 Keon Lyn – junior; 9 Ri'Shard Anderson – senior; 19 Joe Nassib – junior; 20 Julian Whigham – freshman; 24 Jatson George – sophomore; 43 Franklin Santos – sophomore; Safety: 3 Durell Eskridge – sophomore; 6 Ritchy Desir – sophomore; 12 Dontez Ford – freshman; 16 James Jarrett – senior; 21 Shamarko Thomas – senior; 28 Jeremi Wilkes – junior; Long snapper: 47 Sam Rodgers – sophomore; 61 Eric Morris – senior; Punter: 46 Jonathan Fisher – sophomore; 92 Riley Dixon – sophomore; Kicker: 19 Ryan Lichtenstein – senior; 37 Ross Krautman – junior; 49 Ryan Norton – freshman

== Schedule ==
Date	Time	Opponent	Site	TV	Result	Attendance
September 1	12:00 pm	Northwestern*	Carrier Dome; Syracuse, NY	ESPN2	L 41–42	37,830
September 8	3:30 pm	vs. No. 2 USC*	MetLife Stadium; East Rutherford, NJ	ABC/ESPN2	L 28–42	39,507
September 15	4:00 pm	No. 17 (FCS) Stony Brook*	Carrier Dome; Syracuse, NY	TWCS/SNY	W 28–17	34,512
September 22	8:00 pm	at Minnesota*	TCF Bank Stadium; Minneapolis, MN	BTN	L 10–17	50,805
October 5	7:00 pm	Pittsburgh	Carrier Dome; Syracuse, NY (rivalry)	ESPN	W 14–13	40,394
October 13	12:00 pm	at No. 19 Rutgers	High Point Solutions Stadium; Piscataway, NJ	Big East Network	L 15–23	48,011
October 19	8:00 pm	Connecticut	Carrier Dome; Syracuse, NY (rivalry)	ESPN	W 40–10	36,715
October 27	7:00 pm	at South Florida	Raymond James Stadium; Tampa, FL	ESPN3	W 37–36	38,562
November 3	12:00 pm	at Cincinnati	Nippert Stadium; Cincinnati, OH	Big East Network	L 24–35	26,180
November 10	12:00 pm	No. 10 Louisville^{†}	Carrier Dome; Syracuse, NY	ABC	W 45–26	40,312
November 17	7:00 pm	at Missouri*	Faurot Field; Columbia, MO	ESPNU	W 31–27	63,045
November 23	11:00 am	at Temple	Lincoln Financial Field; Philadelphia, PA	ESPN2	W 38–20	22,317
December 29	3:15 pm	vs. West Virginia*	Yankee Stadium; Bronx, NY (Pinstripe Bowl) (rivalry)	ESPN	W 38–14	39,098
*Non-conference game; ^{†}Homecoming; Rankings from Coaches' Poll released prior to the game; All times are in Eastern time

== Game summaries ==
=== Northwestern ===
	1	2	3	4	Total
Wildcats	7	14	14	7	42
Orange	6	7	14	14	41

Northwestern defeated Syracuse in the Orange's home opener by a score of 42–41. Syracuse quarterback Ryan Nassib threw for 482 yards with four touchdowns and one interception. Wide receiver Marcus Sales caught twelve passes for 129 yards and one touchdown. After trailing 35–13 halfway through the 3rd quarter, the Orange stormed back to take a 41–35 lead with less than three minutes left in the game. The defense would not hold, however, as Northwestern scored the go-ahead touchdown with 44 seconds remaining.

1st quarter scoring: SYR: Ross Krautman 22 Yd FG; SYR: Ross Krautman 33 Yd FG; NU: Mark Venric 82 Yd Punt Return

2nd quarter scoring: SYR: Prince-Tyson Gulley 14 Yd Run (Ross Krautman Kick); NU: Mark Venric 21 Yd Pass From Kain Colter (Jeff Budzien Kick); NU: Christian Jones 14 Yd Pass From Kain Colter (Jeff Budzien Kick)

3rd quarter scoring: NU: Chi Chi Ariguzo 33 Yd Fumble Recovery (Jeff Budzien Kick); NU: Kain Colter 1 Yd Run (Jeff Budzien Kick); SYR: Marcus Sales 7 Yd Pass From Ryan Nassib (Ross Krautman Kick); SYR: Jeremiah Kobena 50 Yd Pass From Ryan Nassib (Ross Krautman Kick)

4th quarter scoring: SYR: Jeremiah Kobena 7 Yd Pass From Ryan Nassib (Ross Krautman Kick); SYR: Christopher Clark 20 Yd Pass From Ryan Nassib (Prince-Tyson Gulley Two-Point Run Conversion); NU: Demitrius Fields 9 Yd Pass From Trevor Siemian (Jeff Budzien Kick)

=== USC ===
	1	2	3	4	Total
#2 Trojans	0	14	7	21	42
Orange	0	3	13	13	29

This game was played at MetLife Stadium in East Rutherford, New Jersey. Ryan Nassib threw for 322 yards with two touchdowns and two interceptions. Marcus Sales caught eight passes for 104 yards and two touchdowns. The Orange looked poised to upset the Trojans, trailing by only five points at the end of the third quarter. A dominating 4th quarter performance by USC quarterback Matt Barkley proved to be too much, however, as the Trojans dealt Syracuse their second loss with a final score of 42–29.

1st quarter scoring: None

2nd quarter scoring: USC: Marqise Lee 13 Yd Pass From Matt Barkley (Alex Wood Kick); USC – Robert Woods 29 Yd Pass From Matt Barkley (Alex Wood Kick); SYR – Ross Krautman 37 Yd FG

3rd quarter scoring: USC – Robert Woods 4 Yd Pass From Matt Barkley (Alex Wood Kick); SYR – Marcus Sales 3 Yd Pass From Ryan Nassib (Ross Krautman Kick); SYR – Prince-Tyson Gulley 8 Yd Run (Two-Point Conversion Failed)

4th quarter scoring: USC: Xavier Grimble 22 Yd Pass From Matt Barkley (Alex Wood Kick); USC – Marqise Lee 4 Yd Pass From Matt Barkley (Alex Wood Kick); SYR – Marcus Sales 17 Yd Pass From Ryan Nassib (Two-Point Conversion Failed); USC – Marqise Lee 3 Yd Pass From Matt Barkley (Alex Wood Kick); SYR – Ryan Nassib 1 Yd Run (Ross Krautman Kick)

=== Stony Brook ===
	1	2	3	4	Total
Seawolves	10	7	0	0	17
Orange	7	7	7	7	28

The Orange returned to the Carrier Dome to take on FCS Stony Brook. After trailing by three at the half, the Orange defense held the Seawolves to a scoreless second half, and the offense did the rest at Syracuse won its first game, 28–17. Ryan Nassib threw for 335 yards with three touchdowns.

1st quarter scoring: SB: Kevin Norrell 63 Yd Pass From Kyle Essington (Wesley Skiffington Kick); SYR: Prince-Tyson Gulley 61 Yd Pass From Ryan Nassib (Ross Krautman Kick); SB: Wesley Skiffington 20 Yd FG

2nd quarter scoring: SYR: Ashton Broyld 22 Yd Run (Ross Krautman Kick); SB: Miguel Maysonet 71 Yd Run (Wesley Skiffington Kick)

3rd quarter scoring: SYR: Jarrod West 13 Yd Pass From Ryan Nassib (Ross Krautman Kick)

4th quarter scoring: SYR: Marcus Sales 19 Yd Pass From Ryan Nassib (Ross Krautman Kick)

=== Minnesota ===
	1	2	3	4	Total
Orange	3	0	0	7	10
Golden Gophers	7	0	7	3	17

The Orange traveled to Minnesota and were stifled by the Golden Gopher defense. Ryan Nassib threw for 228 yards, with one touchdown and two interceptions. This loss gave Syracuse a 1–3 overall record for the season.

1st quarter scoring: MIN: Donnell Kirkwood 2 Yd Run (Jordan Wettstein Kick); SYR: Ross Krautman 33 Yd FG

2nd quarter scoring: None

3rd quarter scoring: MIN: Donnell Kirkwood 1 Yd Run (Jordan Wettstein Kick)

4th quarter scoring: MIN: Jordan Wettstein 43 Yd FG; SYR: Marcus Sales 14 Yd Pass From Ryan Nassib (Ross Krautman Kick)

=== Pittsburgh ===
	1	2	3	4	Total
Panthers	0	10	3	0	13
Orange	14	0	0	0	14

Big East Conference play began as Pittsburgh came to the Carrier Dome. After scoring fourteen points in the first quarter, the Orange were held scoreless by the Pitt defense. Despite scoring only twice, Syracuse held on to edge the Panthers by a score of 14–13. This victory snapped an eight-game FBS losing streak, and was the Orange's first win over Pitt since a double-overtime affair in 2004.

1st quarter scoring: SYR: Adonis Ameen-Moore 1 Yd Run (Ross Krautman Kick); SYR: Dyshawn Davis 52 Yd Fumble Return (Ross Krautman Kick)

2nd quarter scoring: PIT: Ray Graham 1 Yd Run (Kevin Harper Kick); PIT: Kevin Harper 40 Yd FG

3rd quarter scoring: PIT: Kevin Harper 27 Yd FG

4th quarter scoring: None

=== Rutgers ===
	1	2	3	4	Total
Orange	0	7	0	8	15
#20 Scarlet Knights	7	0	10	6	23

Despite putting up 438 total yards, turnovers proved costly as Rutgers beat Syracuse for the second year in a row by a score of 23–15. Ryan Nassib threw for 356 yards with one touchdown and two interceptions.

1st quarter scoring: RUT: Jawan Jamison 1 Yd Run (Nick Borgese Kick)

2nd quarter scoring: SYR: Adonis Ameen-Moore 3 Yd Run (Ross Krautman Kick)

3rd quarter scoring: RUT: Duron Harmon 75 Yd Return Of Blocked Field Goal (Nick Borgese Kick); RUT: Nick Borgese 25 Yd FG

4th quarter scoring: SYR: Christopher Clark 40 Yd Pass From Ryan Nassib (Ryan Nassib Pass To Marcus Sales For Two-Point Conversion)

=== Connecticut ===
	1	2	3	4	Total
Huskies	3	7	0	0	10
Orange	6	14	17	3	40

The Connecticut Huskies took on the Orange in former Syracuse head coach Paul Pasqualoni's first return to the Carrier Dome since he was fired at the end of 2004 season. The Orange blew out the Huskies by a score of 40–10 behind Ryan Nassib's 251 passing yards and running back Jerome Smith's 133 yards on the ground.

1st quarter scoring: SYR: Ross Krautman 22 Yd FG; SYR: Ross Krautman 33 Yd FG; CON: Chad Christen 23 Yd FG

2nd quarter scoring: SYR: Adonis Ameen-Moore 1 Yd Run (Ross Krautman Kick); CON: Ryan Griffin 32 Yd Pass From Chandler Whitmer (Chad Christen Kick); SYR: Beckett Wales 3 Yd Pass From Ryan Nassib (Ross Krautman Kick)

3rd quarter scoring: SYR: Prince-Tyson Gulley 4 Yd Run (Ross Krautman Kick); SYR: Ross Krautman 42 Yd FG; SYR: Alec Lemon 11 Yd Pass From Ryan Nassib (Ross Krautman Kick)

4th quarter scoring: SYR: Ross Krautman 47 Yd FG

=== South Florida ===
	1	2	3	4	Total
Orange	3	0	21	13	37
Bulls	10	13	3	10	36

After trailing by a score of 23–3 at halftime, the Orange rallied in the second half and won on a last-second touchdown pass by Ryan Nassib, who threw for 328 yards and four touchdowns.

1st quarter scoring: SFL: Demetris Murray 1 Yd Run (Maikon Bonani Kick); SYR: Ross Krautman 20 Yd FG; SFL: Maikon Bonani 35 Yd FG

2nd quarter scoring: SFL: Maikon Bonani 32 Yd FG; SFL: Lindsey Lamar 80 Yd Run (Maikon Bonani Kick); SFL: Maikon Bonani 46 Yd FG

3rd quarter scoring: SYR: Jarrod West 31 Yd Pass From Ryan Nassib (Ross Krautman Kick); SYR: Alec Lemon 4 Yd Run (Ross Krautman Kick); SYR: Marcus Sales 5 Yd Pass From Ryan Nassib (Ross Krautman Kick); SFL: Maikon Bonani 41 Yd FG

4th quarter scoring: SFL: Andre Davis 30 Yd Pass From B.J. Daniels (Maikon Bonani Kick); SYR: Marcus Sales 19 Yd Pass From Ryan Nassib (Ross Krautman Kick); SFL: Maikon Bonani 47 Yd; SYR: Alec Lemon 1 Yd Pass From Ryan Nassib (Two-Point Pass Conversion Failed)

=== Cincinnati ===
	1	2	3	4	Total
Orange	10	7	7	0	24
Bearcats	7	7	14	7	35

Looking to go above .500 for the first time all season, the Orange entered Cincinnati and lost a sloppy contest that featured five total turnovers. Despite doubling the Bearcats' total yardage and 286 passing yards from Ryan Nassib, Syracuse fell to 4–5 on the season.

1st quarter scoring CIN: George Winn 5 Yd Run (Tony Miliano Kick); SYR: Ryan Nassib 1 Yd Run (Ross Krautman Kick); SYR: Ross Krautman 24 Yd FG

2nd quarter scoring CIN: Travis Kelce 37 Yd Pass From George Winn (Tony Miliano Kick); SYR: Alec Lemon 14 Yd Pass From Ryan Nassib (Ross Krautman Kick)

3rd quarter scoring CIN: George Winn 1 Yd Run (Tony Miliano Kick); SYR: Jerome Smith 1 Yd Run (Ross Krautman Kick); CIN: Travis Kelce 13 Yd Pass From Brendon Kay (Tony Miliano Kick)

4th quarter scoring: CIN: George Winn 2 Yd Run (Tony Miliano Kick)

=== Louisville ===
	1	2	3	4	Total
#9 Cardinals	10	3	6	7	26
Orange	10	21	7	7	45

Homecoming was good for the Orange as they romped to hand #9 Louisville their first loss of the season. Behind a dominating offensive performance from quarterback Ryan Nassib and running back Jerome Smith, Syracuse put up 524 total yards as they won by a score of 45–26.

1st quarter scoring: SYR: Ross Krautman 20 Yd FG; LOU: John Wallace 37 Yd FG; SYR: Prince-Tyson Gulley 8 Yd Run (Ross Krautman Kick); LOU: Corvin Lamb 53 Yd Pass From Teddy Bridgewater (John Wallace Kick)

2nd quarter scoring: SYR: Alec Lemon 13 Yd Pass From Ryan Nassib (Ross Krautman Kick); SYR: Alec Lemon 37 Yd Pass From Ryan Nassib (Ross Krautman Kick); SYR: Prince-Tyson Gulley 55 Yd Run (Ross Krautman Kick); LOU: John Wallace 35 Yd FG

3rd quarter scoring: SYR: Jerome Smith 35 Yd Run (Ross Krautman Kick; LOU: Eli Rogers 44 Yd Pass From Teddy Bridgewater (PAT Blocked)

4th quarter scoring: SYR: Lewellyn Coker 3 Yd Pass From Ryan Nassib (Ross Krautman Kick); LOU: DeVante Parker 8 Yd Pass From Teddy Bridgewater (John Wallace Kick)

=== Missouri ===
	1	2	3	4	Total
Orange	3	7	0	21	31
Tigers	14	3	0	10	27

Needing one more win to become bowl eligible, the Orange went to Missouri and escaped with a comeback win reminiscent of the game against South Florida a few weeks earlier. Ryan Nassib threw for 385 yards with two touchdowns and one interception, and running backs Prince-Tyson Gulley and Jerome Smith combined for 101 rushing yards and two touchdowns. With their 31–27 win, the Orange became bowl eligible with a 6–5 record.

1st quarter scoring: MIS: Dorial Green-Beckham 70 Yd Pass From James Franklin (Andrew Baggett Kick); SYR: Ross Krautman 44 Yd FG; MIS: Jimmie Hunt 30 Yd Pass From James Franklin (Andrew Baggett Kick)

2nd quarter scoring: MIS: Andrew Baggett 20 Yd FG; SYR: Prince-Tyson Gulley 1 Yd Run (Ross Krautman Kick)

3rd quarter scoring: None

4th quarter scoring: SYR: Alec Lemon 13 Yd Pass From Ryan Nassib (Ross Krautman Kick); MIS: Kendial Lawrence 3 Yd Run (Andrew Baggett Kick); SYR: Jerome Smith 8 Yd Run (Ross Krautman Kick); MIS: Andrew Baggett 46 Yd FG; SYR: Alec Lemon 17 Yd Pass From Ryan Nassib (Ross Krautman Kick)

=== Temple ===
	1	2	3	4	Total
Orange	0	17	7	14	38
Owls	10	3	7	0	20

Looking to extend their winning streak to three games and improve their overall record, the Orange went to Temple and beat the Owls by a score of 38–20. The win brought the Orange's record to 7–5, with a Big East record of 5–2. This game was their last conference game as members of the Big East Conference, and gave the Orange an overall record of 76–75 in the conference.

1st quarter scoring: TEM: Brandon McManus 47 Yd FG; TEM: John Christopher 12 Yd Pass From Clinton Granger (Brandon Mcmanus Kick)

2nd quarter scoring: SYR: Marcus Sales 24 Yd Pass From Ryan Nassib (Ross Krautman Kick); SYR: Adonis Ameen-Moore 18 Yd Run (Ross Krautman Kick); TEM: Brandon McManus 22 Yd FG; SYR: Ross Krautman 26 Yd FG

3rd quarter scoring: TEM: Clinton Granger 10 Yd Run (Brandon McManus Kick); SYR: Adonis Ameen-Moore 1 Yd Run (Ross Krautman Kick)

4th quarter scoring: SYR: Prince-Tyson Gulley 3 Yd Run (Ross Krautman Kick); SYR: Keon Lyn 31 Yd Interception Return (Ross Krautman Kick)

=== West Virginia (Pinstripe Bowl) ===
	1	2	3	4	Total
Mountaineers	0	7	7	0	14
Orange	3	9	23	3	38

After finishing the season at 7–5 and claiming a share of the Big East Conference title, the Orange were invited to play in the Pinstripe Bowl against former Big East rival West Virginia, who were finishing their first season in the Big 12 Conference. Syracuse entered the game riding a two-game winning streak over the Mountaineers, including a 49–23 blowout the previous season. West Virginia entered the game after having been ranked as high as #5 in the nation, but a five-game losing streak dashed any national championship hopes they might have had. At halftime, the score stood 12–7 in favor of the Orange, who came out of the locker room hot and won by a final score of 38–14. Syracuse put up 511 total yards, and their defense held the vaunted Mountaineer offense to just 285 yards, with two safeties. The Orange finished their season with an 8–5 record, winning six of their last seven games.

1st quarter scoring: SYR: Ross Krautman 25 Yd FG

2nd quarter scoring: SYR: Team Safety; SYR: Prince-Tyson Gulley 33 Yd Run (Ross Krautman Kick); WVU: Stedman Bailey 32 Yd Pass From Geno Smith (Tyler Bitancurt Kick)

3rd quarter scoring: SYR: Beckett Wales 10 Yd Pass From Ryan Nassib (Ross Krautman Kick); SYR: Prince-Tyson Gulley 67 Yd Run (Ross Krautman Kick); WVU: Stedman Bailey 29 Yd Pass From Geno Smith (Tyler Bitancurt Kick); SYR: Prince-Tyson Gulley 10 Yd Pass From Ryan Nassib (Ross Krautman Kick); SYR: Team Safety

4th quarter scoring: Ross Krautman 36 Yd FG
