= 2012 NC State Wolfpack football team =

American college football season

2012 NC State Wolfpack football

Music City Bowl, L 24–38 vs. Vanderbilt
- Conference: Atlantic Coast Conference
- Atlantic Division
- Record: 7–6 (4–4 ACC)
- Head coach: Tom O'Brien (6th season; regular season); Dana Bible (interim; bowl game)
- Offensive coordinator: Dana Bible (6th season)
- Offensive scheme: Pro-style
- Defensive coordinator: Mike Archer (6th season)
- Base defense: 4–3
- Home stadium: Carter–Finley Stadium

2012 Atlantic Coast Conference football standings
| | Conf. | | | Overall |
| Team | W | | L | W | | L |
|---|---|---|---|---|---|---|
Atlantic Division
| No. 10 Florida State xy$ | 7 | – | 1 | 12 | – | 2 |
| No. 11 Clemson x | 7 | – | 1 | 11 | – | 2 |
| NC State | 4 | – | 4 | 7 | – | 6 |
| Wake Forest | 3 | – | 5 | 5 | – | 7 |
| Maryland | 2 | – | 6 | 4 | – | 8 |
| Boston College | 1 | – | 7 | 2 | – | 10 |
Coastal Division
| Georgia Tech xy | 5 | – | 3 | 7 | – | 7 |
| North Carolina† | 5 | – | 3 | 8 | – | 4 |
| Miami (FL)‡ | 5 | – | 3 | 7 | – | 5 |
| Virginia Tech | 4 | – | 4 | 7 | – | 6 |
| Duke | 3 | – | 5 | 6 | – | 7 |
| Virginia | 2 | – | 6 | 4 | – | 8 |
Championship: Florida State 21, Georgia Tech 15
$ – BCS representative as conference champion; x – Division champion/co-champions; y – Championship game participant; † North Carolina ineligible for ACC title, championship game, and bowl game due to NCAA sanctions. ‡ Miami ineligible for ACC title, championship game, and bowl game due to self-imposed sanctions.; Rankings from AP Poll

The 2012 NC State Wolfpack football team represented North Carolina State University in the 2012 NCAA Division I FBS football season. The Wolfpack were led by sixth year head coach Tom O'Brien and played their home games at Carter–Finley Stadium. They were members of the Atlantic Division of the Atlantic Coast Conference. The Wolfpack participated in the Music City Bowl and were defeated by Vanderbilt, 38–24.

On November 25, the university announced that it had fired O'Brien as head coach of the Wolfpack after failing to live up the expectations during his six years at the position.

== Schedule ==
| Date | Time | Opponent | Site | TV | Result | Attendance |
|---|---|---|---|---|---|---|
| August 31 | 7:30 pm | vs. Tennessee* | Georgia Dome; Atlanta, GA (Chick-fil-A Kickoff Game) | ESPNU | L 21–35 | 55,529 |
| September 8 | 12:00 pm | at Connecticut* | Rentschler Field; East Hartford, CT | Big East Network | W 10–7 | 34,202 |
| September 15 | 6:00 pm | South Alabama* | Carter–Finley Stadium; Raleigh, NC | ESPN3 | W 31–7 | 54,132 |
| September 22 | 6:00 pm | No. 10 (FCS) The Citadel* | Carter–Finley Stadium; Raleigh, NC | ESPN3 | W 52–14 | 55,145 |
| September 29 | 12:00 pm | at Miami (FL) | Sun Life Stadium; Miami Gardens, FL | ESPNU | L 37–44 | 38,510 |
| October 6 | 8:00 pm | No. 3 Florida State | Carter–Finley Stadium; Raleigh, NC | ESPN2 | W 17–16 | 54,962 |
| October 20 | 3:30 pm | at Maryland | Byrd Stadium; College Park, MD | ESPNU | W 20–18 | 40,217 |
| October 27 | 12:30 pm | at North Carolina | Kenan Memorial Stadium; Chapel Hill, NC (rivalry) | ACCN | L 35–43 | 62,000 |
| November 3 | 12:30 pm | Virginia^{†} | Carter–Finley Stadium; Raleigh, NC | ACCN | L 6–33 | 54,812 |
| November 10 | 3:00 pm | Wake Forest | Carter–Finley Stadium; Raleigh, NC (rivalry) | ACCRSN | W 37–6 | 52,567 |
| November 17 | 3:30 pm | at No. 11 Clemson | Memorial Stadium; Clemson, SC (Textile Bowl) | ABC/ESPN2 | L 48–62 | 77,831 |
| November 24 | 3:00 pm | Boston College | Carter–Finley Stadium; Raleigh, NC | ESPN3 | W 27–10 | 53,020 |
| December 31 | 12:00 pm | at Vanderbilt* | LP Field; Nashville, TN (Music City Bowl) | ESPN | L 24–38 | 55,801 |
*Non-conference game; ^{†}Homecoming; Rankings from AP Poll released prior to the game; All times are in Eastern time

== Personnel ==
2012 NC State Wolfpack football team roster
Players
Coaches
Offense

| Pos. | # | Name | Class |
|---|---|---|---|
| TE | 87 | Mario Carter | Sr |
| RB | 26 | Tony Creecy | So |
| QB | 8 | Mike Glennon | Sr |
| WR | 4 | Tobais Palmer | Sr |
| WR | 2 | Rashard Smith | Jr |
| RB | 10 | Shadrach Thornton | Fr |
| WR | 80 | Bryan Underwood | So |

Defense

| Pos. | # | Name | Class |

Special teams

| Pos. | # | Name | Class |
|---|---|---|---|
| K | 32 | Niklas Sade | So |

Head coach

- Tom O'Brien

Coordinators/assistant coaches

- Mike Archer
- Dana Bible
- Desmond Kitchings

Legend

- (C) Team captain
- (S) Suspended
- (I) Ineligible
- Injured
- Redshirt

== Season summary ==
=== Miami (FL) ===
NC State Wolfpack (3–1) at Miami (FL) Hurricanes (3–1)

| Quarter | 1 | 2 | 3 | 4 | Total |
|---|---|---|---|---|---|
| NC State | 7 | 7 | 7 | 16 | 37 |
| Miami (FL) | 23 | 0 | 7 | 14 | 44 |

at Sun Life Stadium • Miami Gardens, Florida

- Date: September 29
- Game time: 12:00 p.m. EDT
- Game weather: Partly cloudy • 87 °F (31 °C) • Wind SE 8 miles per hour (13 km/h; 7.0 kn)
- Game attendance: 38,510
- Referee: Pat Garvey
- Box Score

Game information

NC State

- Mike Glennon
  24/42, 440 Yds, 4 TD, 2 INT
- Tony Creecy
  19 Rush, 120 Yds, TD
- Tobais Palmer
  5 Rec, 94 Yds

Miami (FL)

- Stephen Morris
  26/49, 566 Yds, 5 TD, INT
- Duke Johnson
  12 Rush, 39 Yds, TD
- Phillip Dorsett
  7 Rec, 191 Yds, 2 TD

Scoring summary

| Quarter | Time | Drive | | | Team | Scoring information | Score | |
| Quarter | Time | Plays | Yards | TOP | Team | Scoring information | NCST | MIA |
|---|---|---|---|---|---|---|---|---|
| 1 | 9:29 | 3 | 68 | 0:42 | NC State | Tony Creecy 1-yard touchdown run, Niklas Sade kick good | 7 | 0 |
| 1 | 8:40 | 3 | 75 | 0:49 | Miami (FL) | Allen Hurns 14-yard touchdown reception from Stephen Morris, Jake Wieclaw kick good | 7 | 7 |
| 2 | 8:28 | | | | Miami (FL) | Mike Glennon tackled in end zone for a safety by Jelani Hamilton | 7 | 9 |
| 1 | 6:52 | 5 | 74 | 1:36 | Miami (FL) | Phillip Dorsett 24-yard touchdown reception from Stephen Morris, Jake Wieclaw kick good | 7 | 16 |
| 1 | 4:18 | 3 | 84 | 1:12 | Miami (FL) | Rashawn Scott 76-yard touchdown reception from Stephen Morris, Jake Wieclaw kick good | 7 | 23 |
| 2 | 14:56 | 3 | 80 | 0:19 | NC State | Tony Creecy 7-yard touchdown reception from Mike Glennon, Niklas Sade kick good | 14 | 23 |
| 3 | 8:14 | 13 | 74 | 6:46 | NC State | Bryan Underwood 4-yard touchdown reception from Mike Glennon, Niklas Sade kick good | 21 | 23 |
| 3 | 0:54 | 10 | 90 | 3:24 | Miami (FL) | Duke Johnson 4-yard touchdown run, Jake Wieclaw kick good | 21 | 30 |
| 4 | 10:23 | 13 | 97 | 5:31 | NC State | Bryan Underwood 28-yard touchdown reception from Mike Glennon, Niklas Sade kick no good | 27 | 30 |
| 4 | 8:00 | 7 | 76 | 2:23 | Miami (FL) | Rashawn Scott 13-yard touchdown reception from Stephen Morris, Jake Wieclaw kick good | 27 | 37 |
| 4 | 5:43 | 6 | 78 | 2:17 | NC State | Rashard Smith 6-yard touchdown reception from Mike Glennon, Niklas Sade kick good | 34 | 37 |
| 4 | 1:58 | 8 | 41 | 2:10 | NC State | 50-yard field goal by Niklas Sade | 37 | 37 |
| 4 | 0:19 | 3 | 61 | 0:29 | Miami (FL) | Phillip Dorsett 62-yard touchdown reception from Stephen Morris, Jake Wieclaw kick good | 37 | 44 |
| "TOP" = time of possession. For other American football terms, see Glossary of American football. | | | | | | | 37 | 44 |

=== Clemson ===
NC State Wolfpack (6–4) at #9 Clemson Tigers (9–1)

| Quarter | 1 | 2 | 3 | 4 | Total |
|---|---|---|---|---|---|
| NC State | 21 | 3 | 14 | 10 | 48 |
| Clemson | 13 | 28 | 21 | 0 | 62 |

at Memorial Stadium • Clemson, South Carolina

- Date: November 17
- Game time: 3:30 p.m. EDT
- Game weather: Sunny • 57 °F (14 °C) • Wind E 9 miles per hour (14 km/h; 7.8 kn)
- Game attendance: 76,000
- Referee: J. Magallanes
- Box Score

Game information

NC State

- Mike Glennon
  29/53, 493 Yds, 5 TD, INT
- Shadrach Thornton
  21 Rush, 114 Yds, TD
- Tobais Palmer
  7 Rec, 219 Yds, 3 TD

Clemson

- Tajh Boyd
  30/44, 426 Yds, 5 TD, 2 INT
- Andre Ellington
  22 Rush, 124 Yds
- Sammy Watkins
  11 Rec, 110 Yds, TD

Scoring summary

| Quarter | Time | Drive | | | Team | Scoring information | Score | |
| Quarter | Time | Plays | Yards | TOP | Team | Scoring information | NCST | CLEM |
|---|---|---|---|---|---|---|---|---|
| 1 | 12:56 | 9 | 46 | 2:04 | Clemson | 46-yard field goal by Chandler Catanzaro | 0 | 3 |
| 1 | 9:54 | 9 | 66 | 2:21 | Clemson | Tajh Boyd 4-yard touchdown run, Chandler Catanzaro kick good | 0 | 10 |
| 1 | 7:31 | 6 | 25 | 1:35 | Clemson | 43-yard field goal by Chandler Catanzaro | 0 | 13 |
| 1 | 7:13 | 1 | 77 | 0:13 | NC State | Tobais Palmer 77-yard touchdown reception from Mike Glennon, Niklas Sade kick good | 7 | 13 |
| 1 | 6:19 | 1 | 49 | 0:09 | NC State | Tobais Palmer 49-yard touchdown reception from Mike Glennon, Niklas Sade kick good | 14 | 13 |
| 1 | 1:36 | 9 | 81 | 2:49 | NC State | Rashard Smith 18-yard touchdown reception from Mike Glennon, Niklas Sade kick good | 21 | 13 |
| 2 | 14:17 | 5 | 19 | 1:24 | NC State | 32-yard field goal by Niklas Sade | 24 | 13 |
| 2 | 12:52 | 8 | 78 | 1:21 | Clemson | Brandon Ford 7-yard touchdown reception from Tajh Boyd, 2-point pass failed | 24 | 19 |
| 2 | 10:28 | 4 | 59 | 0:33 | Clemson | Sammy Watkins 27-yard touchdown reception from Tajh Boyd, 2-point pass good | 24 | 27 |
| 2 | 2:22 | 5 | 80 | 1:23 | Clemson | DeAndre Hopkins 62-yard touchdown reception from Tajh Boyd, Chandler Catanzaro kick good | 24 | 34 |
| 2 | 1:14 | 4 | 32 | 0:53 | Clemson | Tajh Boyd 9-yard touchdown run, Chandler Catanzaro kick good | 24 | 41 |
| 3 | 11:00 | 4 | 68 | 1:02 | Clemson | Martavis Bryant 40-yard touchdown reception from Tajh Boyd, Chandler Catanzaro kick good | 24 | 48 |
| 3 | 4:13 | 10 | 74 | 2:58 | Clemson | Tajh Boyd 9-yard touchdown run, Chandler Catanzaro kick good | 24 | 55 |
| 3 | 3:55 | 1 | 16 | 0:06 | NC State | Shadrach Thornton 16-yard touchdown run, Niklas Sade kick good | 31 | 55 |
| 3 | 2:38 | 1 | 6 | 0:06 | NC State | Mario Carter 6-yard touchdown reception from Mike Glennon, Niklas Sade kick good | 38 | 55 |
| 3 | 1:39 | 3 | 75 | 0:59 | Clemson | Brandon Ford 69-yard touchdown reception from Tajh Boyd, Chandler Catanzaro kick good | 38 | 62 |
| 4 | 14:20 | 10 | 56 | 2:11 | NC State | Tobais Palmer 29-yard touchdown reception from Mike Glennon, Niklas Sade kick good | 45 | 62 |
| 4 | 7:35 | 13 | 63 | 3:22 | NC State | 40-yard field goal by Niklas Sade | 48 | 62 |
| "TOP" = time of possession. For other American football terms, see Glossary of American football. | | | | | | | 48 | 62 |
