= 2012 Miami Hurricanes football team =

American college football season

2012 Miami Hurricanes football
- Conference: Atlantic Coast Conference
- Coastal Division
- Record: 7–5 (5–3 ACC)
- Head coach: Al Golden (2nd season)
- Offensive coordinator: Jedd Fisch (2nd season)
- Offensive scheme: Spread
- Defensive coordinator: Mark D'Onofrio (2nd season)
- Base defense: 4–3
- Home stadium: Sun Life Stadium

2012 Atlantic Coast Conference football standings
	Conf.			Overall
Team	W		L	W		L
Atlantic Division
No. 10 Florida State xy$	7	–	1	12	–	2
No. 11 Clemson x	7	–	1	11	–	2
NC State	4	–	4	7	–	6
Wake Forest	3	–	5	5	–	7
Maryland	2	–	6	4	–	8
Boston College	1	–	7	2	–	10
Coastal Division
Georgia Tech xy	5	–	3	7	–	7
North Carolina†	5	–	3	8	–	4
Miami (FL)‡	5	–	3	7	–	5
Virginia Tech	4	–	4	7	–	6
Duke	3	–	5	6	–	7
Virginia	2	–	6	4	–	8
Championship: Florida State 21, Georgia Tech 15
$ – BCS representative as conference champion; x – Division champion/co-champions; y – Championship game participant; † North Carolina ineligible for ACC title, championship game, and bowl game due to NCAA sanctions. ‡ Miami ineligible for ACC title, championship game, and bowl game due to self-imposed sanctions.; Rankings from AP Poll

The 2012 Miami Hurricanes football team represented the University of Miami during the 2012 NCAA Division I FBS football season. It was the Hurricanes' 87th season of football and 9th as a member of the Atlantic Coast Conference. The Hurricanes were led by second-year head coach Al Golden and played their home games at Sun Life Stadium. They finished the season 7–5 overall and 5–3 in the ACC to finish in a three-way tie for first place in the Coastal Division. The Hurricanes served a self-imposed bowl ban due to an ongoing NCAA investigation.

== Schedule ==
Date	Time	Opponent	Site	TV	Result	Attendance
September 1	3:30 pm	at Boston College	Alumni Stadium; Chestnut Hill, MA	ABC	W 41–32	39,362
September 8	12:00 pm	at No. 21 Kansas State*	Bill Snyder Family Football Stadium; Manhattan, KS	FX	L 13–52	48,843
September 15	12:00 pm	Bethune-Cookman*	Sun Life Stadium; Miami Gardens, FL	ESPN3	W 38–10	39,435
September 22	3:00 pm	at Georgia Tech	Bobby Dodd Stadium; Atlanta, GA	RSN	W 42–36 ^{OT}	50,390
September 29	12:00 pm	NC State	Sun Life Stadium; Miami Gardens, FL	ESPNU	W 44–37	38,510
October 6	7:30 pm	vs. No. 9 Notre Dame*	Soldier Field; Chicago, IL (Shamrock Series) (rivalry)	NBC	L 3–41	62,871
October 13	2:30 pm	North Carolina	Sun Life Stadium; Miami Gardens, FL	ESPNU	L 14–18	58,954
October 20	8:00 pm	No. 12 Florida State^{†}	Sun Life Stadium; Miami Gardens, FL (rivalry)	ABC	L 20–33	73,328
November 1	7:30 pm	Virginia Tech	Sun Life Stadium; Miami Gardens, FL (rivalry)	ESPN	W 30–12	37,219
November 10	12:00 pm	at Virginia	Scott Stadium; Charlottesville, VA	ABC	L 40–41	45,870
November 17	3:00 pm	South Florida*	Sun Life Stadium; Miami Gardens, FL	RSN	W 40–9	38,869
November 24	12:30 pm	at Duke	Wallace Wade Stadium; Durham, NC	ACCN	W 52–45	26,895
*Non-conference game; ^{†}Homecoming; Rankings from AP Poll released prior to the game; All times are in Eastern time

== Roster ==
As of October 8, 2012

2012 Miami Hurricanes football team roster
Players
Coaches
Offense

Pos.	#	Name	Class
WR	18	Chad Barnes	Jr
OT	79	Malcolm Bunche	So
WR	81	Jontavious Carter	Fr
RB	23	Eduardo Clements	Jr
TE	82	Asante Cleveland	Jr
RB	25	Dallas Crawford	Fr
QB	16	Gray Crow	Fr
QB	12	Preston Dewey	Fr
RB	32	Danny Dillard	Fr
WR	4	Phillip Dorsett	So
TE	49	Dyron Dye	Jr
G	70	Jon Feliciano	So
OT	74	Ereck Flowers	Fr
OT	76	Gadbois Taylor	Fr
FB	33	Maurice Hagans	Jr
FB/TE	43	Sean Harvey	So
OT	77	Seantrel Henderson	Jr
RB	26	Darris Hughes	So
WR	1	Allen Hurns	Jr
WR	37	Alex Irastorza	Jr
G	63	Danny Isidora	Fr
RB	5	Mike James	Sr
WR	24	Davon Johnson	Sr
RB	8	Duke Johnson	Fr
OT	78	Jermaine Johnson	Jr
OT	55	Ben Jones (injured)	Sr
WR	15	D'Mauri Jones	Fr
LB	56	Joshua Flynn	Fr
WR	87	Garrett Kidd	Fr
RB	27	Jameson Labady	Jr
G	68	Jeremy Lewis	Sr
WR	9	Malcolm Lewis (injured)	Fr
G	65	Brandon Linder	Jr
WR	6	Robert Lockhart Jr.	Fr
G	69	Eduardo Lopez	Jr
C	62	Shane McDermott	So
WR	24	Joey McNeill	So
QB	17	Stephen Morris	Jr
WR	28	Shawn O'Dare	Jr
TE	85	David Perry	So
WR	80	Rashawn Scott	So
WR	24	Stephen Sweeney	Fr
WR	83	Kendal Thompkins	Sr
QB	19	David Thompson (injured)	Fr
TE	46	Clive Walford	So
WR	86	Herb Waters	Fr
OT	64	Hunter Wells	Fr
C	75	Jared Wheeler	Jr
TE	84	Cory White	Jr
QB	11	Ryan Williams	So
RB	48	Brandon Yosha	Fr

Defense

Pos.	#	Name	Class
LB	34	Thurston Armbrister	So
LB	54	JaWand Blue	Fr
DT	87	Jacoby Briscoe	Fr
LB	45	Ramon Buchanan (injured)	Sr
S	2	Deon Bush	Fr
DE	94	Kelvin Cain	Jr
DE	71	Anthony Chickillo	So
LB	31	Tyrone Cornileus	Jr
LB	47	Akil Craig	Jr
CB	39	Antonio Crawford	Fr
CB	46	Hugo Delapenha Jr.	Jr
CB	35	Nate Dortch	Fr
DE	48	Chris Dunckel	Sr
LB	57	Nantambu-Akil Fentress	So
CB	20	Thomas Finnie	So
LB	59	James Gaines	Jr
DE	51	Shayon Green	Jr
DT	92	Jalen Grimble	So
CB	37	Ladarius Gunter	So
DE	99	Jelani Hamilton	Fr
S	30	A.J. Highsmith	Jr
DE	97	Dwayne Hoilett	Fr
CB	11	Larry Hope	Fr
CB	3	Tracy Howard	Fr
DT	66	Dequan Ivery	Fr
S	29	Rayshawn Jenkins	Fr
LB	44	Eddie Johnson	Fr
DT	67	Corey King	So
LB	56	Raphael Kirby	Fr
DE	17	Tyriq McCord	Fr
CB	21	Brandon McGee	Sr
DT	72	Earl Moore	Fr
DE	95	Jake O'Donnell	Fr
LB	36	Gionni Paul	So
LB	52	Denzel Perryman	So
DT	91	Olsen Pierre	So
DT	96	Curtis Porter (injured)	Jr
DT	93	Luther Robinson	Jr
S	22	Kacy Rodgers	Jr
DT	98	Darius Smith	Sr
S	28	Andrew Swasey	Sr
S	7	Vaughn Telemaque	Sr
LB	58	Gabriel Terry	Fr
CB	38	Jordan Tolson	So
DE	90	Ricardo Williams	Fr

Special teams

Pos.	#	Name	Class
P	13	Dalton Botts	Sr
P	15	Cameron Dean	Sr
P	27	Ricky Carroll	Jr
K/P	88	Zach Costa	Fr
K	18	Matt Goudis	Fr
K	46	Ricky Perez	Fr
K	40	Jake Wieclaw	Sr
LS	55	Frank Gabriel	Fr
LS	61	Paul Kelly	Sr
LS	60	Sean McNally (injured)	Jr
LS/TE	88	Ronald Regula	So
H	38	Josiah Robins	Fr

Head coach

- Al Golden (2nd year)

Coordinators/assistant coaches

- Mark D'Onofrio – Assistant Head Coach/Defensive Coordinator
- Jedd Fisch – Offensive Coordinator/Quarterbacks
- Michael Barrow – Linebackers/Special Teams
- Brennan Carroll – Tight Ends/National Recruiting Coordinator
- Jethro Franklin – Senior Defensive Assistant/Defensive Line
- Art Kehoe – Offensive Line
- George McDonald – Passing Game Coordinator/Wide Receivers
- Terry Richardson – Running Backs/Florida Recruiting Coordinator
- Paul Williams – Defensive Backs

Legend

- (C) Team captain
- (S) Suspended
- (I) Ineligible
- Injured
- Redshirt

Roster

== Depth chart ==
(Week 7 VS UNC October 13, 2012)

Defense

FS
Deon Bush
Kacy Rodgers II
⋅

WLB	MLB	SLB
⋅	Denzel Perryman	⋅
Thurston Armbrister	Raphael Kirby	⋅
Gabriel Terry	Jimmy Gaines	⋅

SS
AJ Highsmith
Vaughn Telemaque
Rayshawn Jenkins

CB
Brandon McGee
Antonio Crawford
⋅

DE	DT	DT	DE
Anthony Chickillo	Corey King	Olsen Pierre	Shayon Green
Jelani Hamilton	Earl Moore	Luther Robinson	Tyriq McCord
⋅	Dequan Ivery	Darius Smith	⋅

CB
Ladarius Gunter
Tracy Howard
Thomas Finnie

Offense

WR
Rashawn Scott AND Allen Hurns
Herb Waters
Robert Lockhart Jr.

LT	LG	C	RG	RT
Malcolm Bunche	Jon Feliciano	Shane McDermott	Brandon Linder	Ereck Flowers OR
Hunter Wells	Jeremy Lewis	Jared Wheeler	Danny Isidora	Seantrel Henderson
⋅	⋅	⋅	⋅	⋅

TE
Clive Walford
Dyron Dye
Asante Cleveland

WR
Philip Dorsett
Davon Johnson
Kendal Thompkins

QB
Stephen Morris
Ryan Williams
Preston Dewey

RB
Mike James/Duke Johnson
Eduardo Clements
⋅

FB
Maurice Hagens
Sean Harvey
⋅

Special teams
PK Jake Wieclaw
PK Matt Goudis
P Dalton Botts
P Jake Wieclaw
KR Phillip Dorsett/Duke Johnson
PR Phillip Dorsett
LS Paul Kelly
H Dalton Botts

== Season summary ==
=== NC State ===
NC State Wolfpack (3–1) at Miami (FL) Hurricanes (3–1)

Quarter	1	2	3	4	Total
NC State	7	7	7	16	37
Miami (FL)	23	0	7	14	44

at Sun Life Stadium • Miami Gardens, Florida

- Date: September 29
- Game time: 12:00 p.m. EDT
- Game weather: Partly cloudy • 87 °F (31 °C) • Wind SE 8 miles per hour (13 km/h; 7.0 kn)
- Game attendance: 38,510
- Referee: Pat Garvey
- TV announcers (ESPNU): Tom Hart, John Congemi
- Box Score

Game information

NC State

- Mike Glennon
  24/42, 440 Yds, 4 TD, 2 INT
- Tony Creecy
  19 Rush, 120 Yds, TD
- Tobais Palmer
  5 Rec, 94 Yds

Miami (FL)

- Stephen Morris
  26/49, 566 Yds, 5 TD, INT
- Duke Johnson
  12 Rush, 39 Yds, TD
- Phillip Dorsett
  7 Rec, 191 Yds, 2 TD

Scoring summary

Quarter	Time	Drive			Team	Scoring information	Score	
Quarter	Time	Plays	Yards	TOP	Team	Scoring information	NCST	MIA
1	9:29	3	68	0:42	NC State	Tony Creecy 1-yard touchdown run, Niklas Sade kick good	7	0
1	8:40	3	75	0:49	Miami (FL)	Allen Hurns 14-yard touchdown reception from Stephen Morris, Jake Wieclaw kick good	7	7
2	8:28				Miami (FL)	Mike Glennon tackled in end zone for a safety by Jelani Hamilton	7	9
1	6:52	5	74	1:36	Miami (FL)	Phillip Dorsett 24-yard touchdown reception from Stephen Morris, Jake Wieclaw kick good	7	16
1	4:18	3	84	1:12	Miami (FL)	Rashawn Scott 76-yard touchdown reception from Stephen Morris, Jake Wieclaw kick good	7	23
2	14:56	3	80	0:19	NC State	Tony Creecy 7-yard touchdown reception from Mike Glennon, Niklas Sade kick good	14	23
3	8:14	13	74	6:46	NC State	Bryan Underwood 4-yard touchdown reception from Mike Glennon, Niklas Sade kick good	21	23
3	0:54	10	90	3:24	Miami (FL)	Duke Johnson 4-yard touchdown run, Jake Wieclaw kick good	21	30
4	10:23	13	97	5:31	NC State	Bryan Underwood 28-yard touchdown reception from Mike Glennon, Niklas Sade kick no good	27	30
4	8:00	7	76	2:23	Miami (FL)	Rashawn Scott 13-yard touchdown reception from Stephen Morris, Jake Wieclaw kick good	27	37
4	5:43	6	78	2:17	NC State	Rashard Smith 6-yard touchdown reception from Mike Glennon, Niklas Sade kick good	34	37
4	1:58	8	41	2:10	NC State	50-yard field goal by Niklas Sade	37	37
4	0:19	3	61	0:29	Miami (FL)	Phillip Dorsett 62-yard touchdown reception from Stephen Morris, Jake Wieclaw kick good	37	44
"TOP" = time of possession. For other American football terms, see Glossary of American football.							37	44
