= Yosha =

Yosha is a given name and a surname. Notable people with the name include:

- Brandon Yosha (born 1993), American lawyer
- Yaky Yosha (born 1951), Israeli film director
- Yosha Iglesias (born 1987), French chess player

== See also ==
- Yoshua
- Yusha (given name)
- Joscha
