= 2012 Virginia Tech Hokies football team =

American college football season

2012 Virginia Tech Hokies football

Russell Athletic Bowl champion

Russell Athletic Bowl, W 13–10 ^{OT} vs. Rutgers
- Conference: Atlantic Coast Conference
- Coastal Division
- Record: 7–6 (4–4 ACC)
- Head coach: Frank Beamer (26th season)
- Offensive coordinator: Bryan Stinespring (11th season)
- Offensive scheme: Pro-style
- Defensive coordinator: Bud Foster (18th season)
- Base defense: 4–4
- Home stadium: Lane Stadium

2012 Atlantic Coast Conference football standings
	Conf.			Overall
Team	W		L	W		L
Atlantic Division
No. 10 Florida State xy$	7	–	1	12	–	2
No. 11 Clemson x	7	–	1	11	–	2
NC State	4	–	4	7	–	6
Wake Forest	3	–	5	5	–	7
Maryland	2	–	6	4	–	8
Boston College	1	–	7	2	–	10
Coastal Division
Georgia Tech xy	5	–	3	7	–	7
North Carolina†	5	–	3	8	–	4
Miami (FL)‡	5	–	3	7	–	5
Virginia Tech	4	–	4	7	–	6
Duke	3	–	5	6	–	7
Virginia	2	–	6	4	–	8
Championship: Florida State 21, Georgia Tech 15
$ – BCS representative as conference champion; x – Division champion/co-champions; y – Championship game participant; † North Carolina ineligible for ACC title, championship game, and bowl game due to NCAA sanctions. ‡ Miami ineligible for ACC title, championship game, and bowl game due to self-imposed sanctions.; Rankings from AP Poll

The 2012 Virginia Tech Hokies football team represented Virginia Polytechnic Institute and State University in the 2012 NCAA Division I FBS football season. They were led by 26th year head coach Frank Beamer and played their home games at Lane Stadium. They were a member of the Coastal Division of the Atlantic Coast Conference. They finished the season 7–6, 4–4 in ACC play to finish in fourth place in the Coastal Division. They were invited to the Russell Athletic Bowl where they defeated Rutgers in overtime.

== Schedule ==
Date	Time	Opponent	Rank	Site	TV	Result	Attendance
September 3	8:00 p.m.	Georgia Tech	No. 16	Lane Stadium; Blacksburg, VA (Battle of the Techs)	ESPN	W 20–17 ^{OT}	65,632
September 8	1:30 p.m.	Austin Peay*	No. 15	Lane Stadium; Blacksburg, VA	ESPN3	W 42–7	65,632
September 15	12:00 p.m.	at Pittsburgh*	No. 13	Heinz Field; Pittsburgh, PA	ESPNU	L 17–35	48,032
September 22	12:00 p.m.	Bowling Green*		Lane Stadium; Blacksburg, VA	ESPNU	W 37–0	65,632
September 29	3:30 p.m.	vs. Cincinnati*		FedExField; Landover, MD	ESPNU	L 24–27	46,026
October 6	12:30 p.m.	at North Carolina		Kenan Memorial Stadium; Chapel Hill, NC	ACCN	L 34–48	54,000
October 13	12:30 p.m.	Duke^{†}		Lane Stadium; Blacksburg, VA	ACCN	W 41–20	65,632
October 20	12:00 p.m.	at No. 14 Clemson		Memorial Stadium; Clemson, SC	ABC/ESPN2	L 17–38	83,338
November 1	7:30 p.m.	at Miami (FL)		Sun Life Stadium; Miami Gardens, FL (rivalry)	ESPN	L 12–30	37,219
November 8	7:30 p.m.	No. 8 Florida State		Lane Stadium; Blacksburg, VA	ESPN	L 22–28	65,632
November 17	12:30 p.m.	at Boston College		Alumni Stadium; Chestnut Hill, MA (rivalry)	ACCN	W 30–23 ^{OT}	34,266
November 24	12:00 p.m.	Virginia		Lane Stadium; Blacksburg, VA (Commonwealth Cup)	ESPNU	W 17–14	65,632
December 28	5:30 p.m.	vs. Rutgers*		Florida Citrus Bowl Stadium; Orlando, FL (Russell Athletic Bowl)	ESPN	W 13–10 ^{OT}	48,127
*Non-conference game; ^{†}Homecoming; Rankings from AP Poll released prior to the game; All times are in Eastern time

== Rankings ==
Entering the 2012 season, Virginia Tech was ranked No. 16 in the AP and No. 20 Coaches' Preseason Polls. The Hokies rose all the way to No. 13 by Week 3, before dropping out of the polls completely after a 35-17 loss to Pitt.

Ranking movements Legend: ██ Increase in ranking ██ Decrease in ranking — = Not ranked RV = Received votes
	Week															
Poll	Pre	1	2	3	4	5	6	7	8	9	10	11	12	13	14	Final
AP	16	15	13	RV	RV	—	—	—	—	—	—	—	—	—	—	—
Coaches	20	18	13	RV	RV	—	—	—	—	—	—	—	—	—	—	—
Harris	Not released						—	—	—	—	—	—	—	—	—	Not released
BCS	Not released							—	—	—	—	—	—	—	—	Not released
