= 2012 Georgia Tech Yellow Jackets football team =

American college football season

2012 Georgia Tech Yellow Jackets football

ACC Coastal Division champion Sun Bowl champion

ACC Championship Game, L 15–21 vs. Florida State

Sun Bowl, W 21–7 vs. USC
- Conference: Atlantic Coast Conference
- Coastal Division
- Record: 7–7 (5–3 ACC)
- Head coach: Paul Johnson (5th season)
- Offensive scheme: Flexbone triple option
- Defensive coordinator: Al Groh (3rd season; first six games); Charles Kelly (interim; remainder of season)
- Base defense: 3–4
- Home stadium: Bobby Dodd Stadium

The 2012 Georgia Tech Yellow Jackets football team represented the Georgia Institute of Technology in the 2012 NCAA Division I FBS football season. The Yellow Jackets were led by fifth year head coach Paul Johnson and played their home games at Bobby Dodd Stadium. They were members of the Coastal Division of the Atlantic Coast Conference. They finished the season 7–7, 5–3 in ACC play to share the Coastal Division Championship with Miami and North Carolina. With Miami and North Carolina on post seasons bans, Georgia Tech represented the division in the ACC Championship Game where they were defeated by Florida State. They were invited to the Sun Bowl where they defeated USC.

== Previous season ==
They finished the 2011 Season at 8–5, 5–3 in ACC play to finish in a tie for second place in the Coastal Division. They were invited to the Sun Bowl where they were defeated by Utah 30-27 in OT.

== Schedule ==
2012 Atlantic Coast Conference football standings
	Conf.			Overall
Team	W		L	W		L
Atlantic Division
No. 10 Florida State xy$	7	–	1	12	–	2
No. 11 Clemson x	7	–	1	11	–	2
NC State	4	–	4	7	–	6
Wake Forest	3	–	5	5	–	7
Maryland	2	–	6	4	–	8
Boston College	1	–	7	2	–	10
Coastal Division
Georgia Tech xy	5	–	3	7	–	7
North Carolina†	5	–	3	8	–	4
Miami (FL)‡	5	–	3	7	–	5
Virginia Tech	4	–	4	7	–	6
Duke	3	–	5	6	–	7
Virginia	2	–	6	4	–	8
Championship: Florida State 21, Georgia Tech 15
$ – BCS representative as conference champion; x – Division champion/co-champions; y – Championship game participant; † North Carolina ineligible for ACC title, championship game, and bowl game due to NCAA sanctions. ‡ Miami ineligible for ACC title, championship game, and bowl game due to self-imposed sanctions.; Rankings from AP Poll

Date	Time	Opponent	Site	Result	Attendance
September 3	8:00 pm	at No. 16 Virginia Tech	Lane Stadium; Blacksburg, VA (Battle of the Techs)	L 17–20 ^{OT}	65,632
September 8	7:00 pm	Presbyterian*	Bobby Dodd Stadium; Atlanta, GA	W 59–3	41,678
September 15	3:30 pm	Virginia	Bobby Dodd Stadium; Atlanta, GA	W 56–20	44,225
September 22	3:00 pm	Miami (FL)	Bobby Dodd Stadium; Atlanta, GA	L 36–42 ^{OT}	50,390
September 29	12:00 pm	Middle Tennessee*	Bobby Dodd Stadium; Atlanta, GA	L 28–49	39,270
October 6	3:30 pm	at No. 15 Clemson	Memorial Stadium; Clemson, SC (rivalry)	L 31–47	82,873
October 20	3:00 pm	Boston College	Bobby Dodd Stadium; Atlanta, GA	W 37–17	40,112
October 27	3:00 pm	BYU*^{†}	Bobby Dodd Stadium; Atlanta, GA	L 17–41	50,103
November 3	12:30 pm	at Maryland	Byrd Stadium; College Park, MD	W 33–13	33,471
November 10	12:30 pm	at North Carolina	Kenan Memorial Stadium; Chapel Hill, NC	W 68–50	50,000
November 17	3:30 pm	Duke	Bobby Dodd Stadium; Atlanta, GA	W 42–24	41,904
November 24	12:00 pm	at No. 3 Georgia*	Sanford Stadium; Athens, GA (Clean, Old-Fashioned Hate)	L 10–42	92,746
December 1	7:45 pm	vs. No. 13 Florida State	Bank of America Stadium; Charlotte, NC (ACC Championship Game)	L 15–21	64,778
December 31	2:00 pm	vs. USC*	Sun Bowl Stadium; El Paso, TX (Sun Bowl)	W 21–7	47,922
*Non-conference game; ^{†}Homecoming; Rankings from Coaches' Poll released prior to the game; All times are in Eastern time

== Rankings ==
Ranking movements Legend: ██ Increase in ranking ██ Decrease in ranking — = Not ranked RV = Received votes
	Week															
Poll	Pre	1	2	3	4	5	6	7	8	9	10	11	12	13	14	Final
AP	RV	RV	RV	RV	—	—	—	—	—	—	—	—	—	—		—
Coaches	RV	RV	RV	RV	—	—	—	—	—	—	—	—	—			—
Harris	Not released						—	—	—	—	—	—	—			Not released
BCS	Not released							—	—	—	—	—	—			Not released
