= 2012 ACC Championship Game =

2012 Dr. Pepper ACC Championship Game
- Conference Championship
Florida State Seminoles	Georgia Tech Yellow Jackets
(10–2)	(6–6)
21	15
Head coach: Jimbo Fisher	Head coach: Paul Johnson
AP / Coaches / BCS; 13 / 12 / 13
	1	2	3	4	Total
Florida State	7	14	0	0	21
Georgia Tech	0	6	3	6	15
- Date: December 1, 2012
- Season: 2012
- Stadium: Bank of America Stadium
- Location: Charlotte, North Carolina
- MVP: James Wilder Jr. (RB, Florida State)
- Favorite: Florida State by 14
- Referee: Gary Patterson

United States TV coverage
- Network: ESPN
- Announcers: Brent Musburger, Kirk Herbstreit & Heather Cox

The 2012 ACC Championship Game was the eighth football championship game for the Atlantic Coast Conference. It featured the winners of the ACCs two divisions, the Atlantic Division's Florida State Seminoles and the Coastal Division's Georgia Tech Yellow Jackets. With three teams tied for the first place in the Coastal Division, only Georgia Tech was eligible for the Championship Game. Miami self-imposed a postseason ban in a bid to lessen possible NCAA sanctions (see 2011 University of Miami athletics scandal). North Carolina was serving a one-year bowl ban handed down by the NCAA as part of the University of North Carolina at Chapel Hill football scandal.

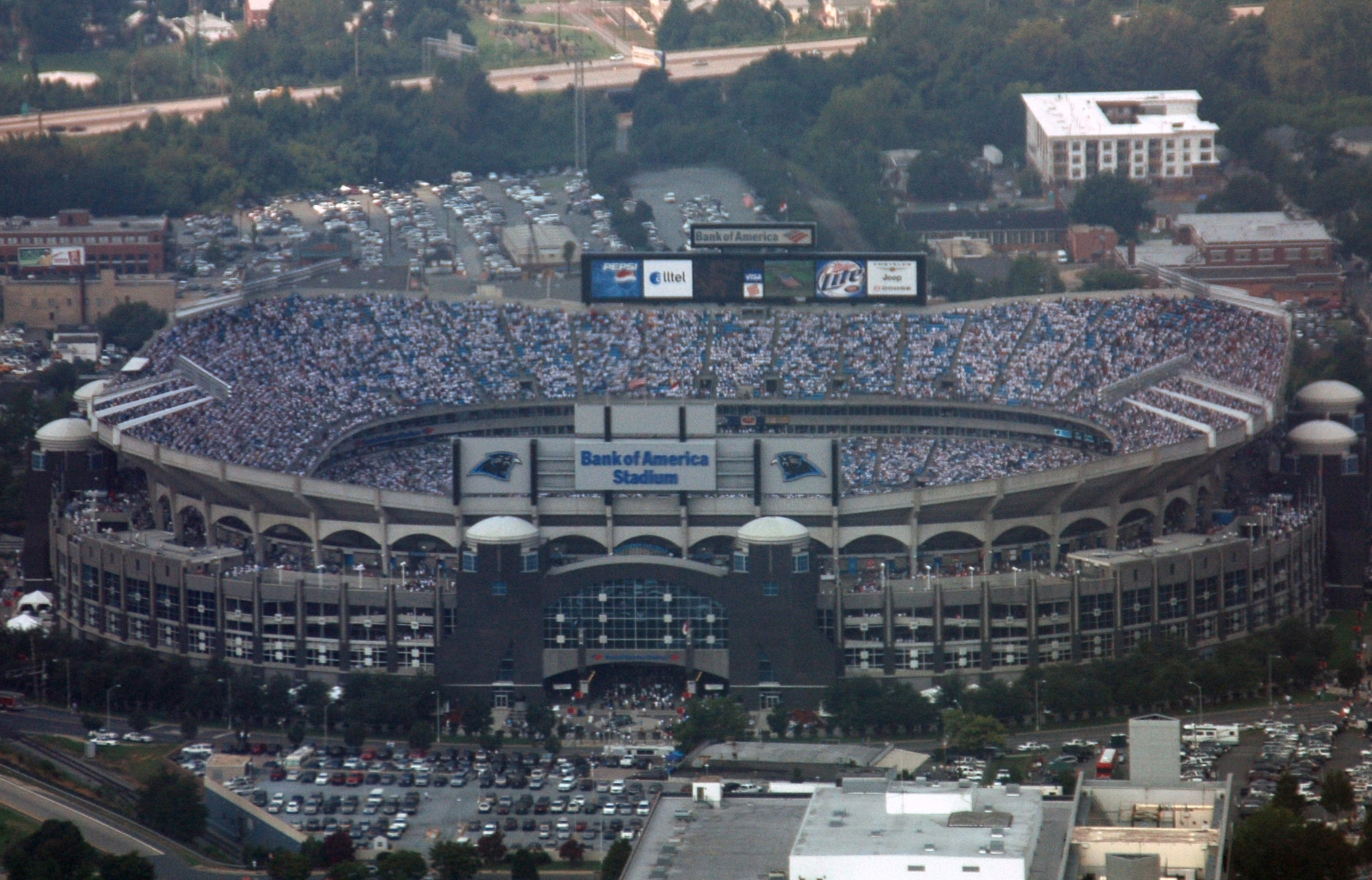
Bank of America Stadium in Charlotte, North Carolina, site of the 2012 ACC Championship Game

This was the game's third consecutive year at Bank of America Stadium in Charlotte, North Carolina.

2012 Atlantic Coast Conference football standings
	Conf.			Overall
Team	W		L	W		L
Atlantic Division
No. 10 Florida State xy$	7	–	1	12	–	2
No. 11 Clemson x	7	–	1	11	–	2
NC State	4	–	4	7	–	6
Wake Forest	3	–	5	5	–	7
Maryland	2	–	6	4	–	8
Boston College	1	–	7	2	–	10
Coastal Division
Georgia Tech xy	5	–	3	7	–	7
North Carolina†	5	–	3	8	–	4
Miami (FL)‡	5	–	3	7	–	5
Virginia Tech	4	–	4	7	–	6
Duke	3	–	5	6	–	7
Virginia	2	–	6	4	–	8
Championship: Florida State 21, Georgia Tech 15
$ – BCS representative as conference champion; x – Division champion/co-champions; y – Championship game participant; † North Carolina ineligible for ACC title, championship game, and bowl game due to NCAA sanctions. ‡ Miami ineligible for ACC title, championship game, and bowl game due to self-imposed sanctions.; Rankings from AP Poll
