= 2012 Wake Forest Demon Deacons football team =

American college football season

2012 Wake Forest Demon Deacons football
- Conference: Atlantic Coast Conference
- Atlantic Division
- Record: 5–7 (3–5 ACC)
- Head coach: Jim Grobe (12th season)
- Offensive coordinator: Steed Lobotzke (10th season)
- Offensive scheme: Spread
- Defensive coordinator: Brian Knorr (2nd season)
- Base defense: Multiple
- Captain: Game captains
- Home stadium: BB&T Field

2012 Atlantic Coast Conference football standings
	Conf.			Overall
Team	W		L	W		L
Atlantic Division
No. 10 Florida State xy$	7	–	1	12	–	2
No. 11 Clemson x	7	–	1	11	–	2
NC State	4	–	4	7	–	6
Wake Forest	3	–	5	5	–	7
Maryland	2	–	6	4	–	8
Boston College	1	–	7	2	–	10
Coastal Division
Georgia Tech xy	5	–	3	7	–	7
North Carolina†	5	–	3	8	–	4
Miami (FL)‡	5	–	3	7	–	5
Virginia Tech	4	–	4	7	–	6
Duke	3	–	5	6	–	7
Virginia	2	–	6	4	–	8
Championship: Florida State 21, Georgia Tech 15
$ – BCS representative as conference champion; x – Division champion/co-champions; y – Championship game participant; † North Carolina ineligible for ACC title, championship game, and bowl game due to NCAA sanctions. ‡ Miami ineligible for ACC title, championship game, and bowl game due to self-imposed sanctions.; Rankings from AP Poll

The 2012 Wake Forest Demon Deacons football team represented Wake Forest University during the 2012 NCAA Division I FBS football season. The team was coached by Jim Grobe, who was coaching his twelfth season at the school, and played its home games at BB&T Field. Wake Forest competed in the Atlantic Coast Conference, as they have since the league's inception in 1953, and are in the Atlantic Division.

== Before the season ==
=== Recruiting ===
On national signing day, the Demon Deacons received letters of intent from 19 players.

College recruiting information
Name	Hometown	School	Height	Weight	40^{‡}	Commit date
Josh Banks; DE	Cary, NC	Middle Creek HS	6 ft 4 in (1.93 m)	250 lb (110 kg)	4.80	Jul 17, 2011
Josh Banks; DE	Recruit ratings: Scout: Rivals: (76)					
Tyler Cameron; QB	Jupiter, FL	Jupiter HS	6 ft 3 in (1.91 m)	210 lb (95 kg)	4.65	Dec 3, 2011
Tyler Cameron; QB	Recruit ratings: Scout: Rivals: (78)					
Jared Crump; WR	St. Johns, FL	Bartram Trail HS	6 ft 3 in (1.91 m)	190 lb (86 kg)	4.50	Oct 7, 2011
Jared Crump; WR	Recruit ratings: Scout: Rivals: (76)					
Steve Donatell; ATH	Lone Tree, CO	Highlands Ranch HS	6 ft 5 in (1.96 m)	195 lb (88 kg)	4.60	Jan 23, 2012
Steve Donatell; ATH	Recruit ratings: Scout: Rivals: (76)					
Dominique Gibson; S	Belle Glade, FL	Glades Central HS	5 ft 10 in (1.78 m)	195 lb (88 kg)	4.60	Oct 21, 2011
Dominique Gibson; S	Recruit ratings: Scout: Rivals: (78)					
Zach Gordon; TE	Carrollton, GA	Carrollton HS	6 ft 5 in (1.96 m)	235 lb (107 kg)	4.97	Jul 29, 2011
Zach Gordon; TE	Recruit ratings: Scout: Rivals: (74)					
Tylor Harris; DE	Baton Rouge, LA	Episcopal HS	6 ft 4 in (1.93 m)	245 lb (111 kg)	4.70	Jan 29, 2012
Tylor Harris; DE	Recruit ratings: Scout: Rivals: (75)					
Tyler Hayworth; OG	Kingsport, TN	Dobyns-Bennett HS	6 ft 4 in (1.93 m)	306 lb (139 kg)	5.40	Aug 4, 2011
Tyler Hayworth; OG	Recruit ratings: Scout: Rivals: (75)					
Ryan Janvion; S	Pembroke Pines, FL	Dade-Christian HS	5 ft 11 in (1.80 m)	180 lb (82 kg)	4.60	Aug 2, 2011
Ryan Janvion; S	Recruit ratings: Scout: Rivals: (75)					
Kevis Jones; ATH	Oakland Park, FL	Northeast HS	6 ft 2 in (1.88 m)	220 lb (100 kg)	4.55	Dec 7, 2011
Kevis Jones; ATH	Recruit ratings: Scout: Rivals: (74)					
Shelldon Lewinson; NG	Seffner, FL	Armwood HS	6 ft 2 in (1.88 m)	240 lb (110 kg)	N/A	Jul 20, 2011
Shelldon Lewinson; NG	Recruit ratings: Scout: Rivals: (76)					
Teddy Matthews; LB	West Palm Beach, FL	Royal Palm Beach HS	6 ft 3 in (1.91 m)	225 lb (102 kg)	N/A	Jan 22, 2012
Teddy Matthews; LB	Recruit ratings: Scout: Rivals: (45)					
Anthony Rook; TE	Winterville, NC	Greenville Rose HS	6 ft 4 in (1.93 m)	235 lb (107 kg)	4.70	Jun 16, 2011
Anthony Rook; TE	Recruit ratings: Scout: Rivals: (78)					
Will Smith; OT	Charlotte, NC	Christchurch HS	6 ft 5 in (1.96 m)	285 lb (129 kg)	5.30	Jul 26, 2011
Will Smith; OT	Recruit ratings: Scout: Rivals: (76)					
Joel Suggs; OT	Sophia, NC	Randleman HS	6 ft 6 in (1.98 m)	285 lb (129 kg)	N/A	Mar 4, 2011
Joel Suggs; OT	Recruit ratings: Scout: Rivals: (75)					
LaRonji Vason; CB	Prattville, AL	Prattville, HS	5 ft 11 in (1.80 m)	180 lb (82 kg)	4.50	Jun 21, 2011
LaRonji Vason; CB	Recruit ratings: Scout: Rivals: (74)					
James Ward; CB	DeLand, FL	DeLand HS	5 ft 10 in (1.78 m)	170 lb (77 kg)	N/A	Dec 15, 2011
James Ward; CB	Recruit ratings: Scout: Rivals: (73)					
Joshua Wilhite; RB	Fresno, TX	Fort Bend Hightower HS	5 ft 10 in (1.78 m)	187 lb (85 kg)	4.50	Jul 30, 2011
Joshua Wilhite; RB	Recruit ratings: Scout: Rivals: (74)					
Jonathan Williams; WR	Atlanta, GA	Mays HS	6 ft 4 in (1.93 m)	170 lb (77 kg)	4.50	Sep 11, 2011
Jonathan Williams; WR	Recruit ratings: Scout: Rivals: (75)					
Overall recruit ranking: Scout: 73 Rivals: 69
‡ Refers to 40-yard dash; Note: In many cases, Scout, Rivals, 247Sports, On3, and ESPN may conflict in their listings of height, weight and 40 time.; In these cases, the average was taken. ESPN grades are on a 100-point scale.; Sources: "Wake Forest 2012 Football Commitments". Rivals.; "2012 Wake Forest Commits". Scout.; "2012 Player Commitments – Wake Forest". ESPN.; "Scout.com Team Recruiting Rankings". Scout.; "2012 Team Ranking". Rivals.com.

== Schedule ==
Date	Time	Opponent	Site	TV	Result	Attendance
September 1	6:30 p.m.	Liberty*	BB&T Field; Winston-Salem, NC	ESPN3	W 20–17	27,652
September 8	3:00 p.m.	North Carolina	BB&T Field; Winston-Salem, NC (rivalry)	RSN	W 28–27	29,526
September 15	12:00 p.m.	at No. 6 Florida State	Doak Campbell Stadium; Tallahassee, FL	ESPN	L 0–52	68,833
September 22	12:30 p.m.	Army*^{†}	BB&T Field; Winston-Salem, NC	ACCN	W 49–37	30,207
September 29	12:30 p.m.	Duke	BB&T Field; Winston-Salem, NC (rivalry)	ACCN	L 27–34	28,743
October 6	3:30 p.m.	at Maryland	Byrd Stadium; College Park, MD	ESPNU	L 14–19	40,391
October 20	12:30 p.m.	at Virginia	Scott Stadium; Charlottesville, VA	ACCN	W 16–10	41,167
October 25	7:30 p.m.	No. 13 Clemson	BB&T Field; Winston-Salem, NC	ESPN	L 13–42	31,162
November 3	3:30 p.m.	Boston College	BB&T Field; Winston-Salem, NC	RSN	W 28–14	28,963
November 10	3:00 p.m.	at NC State	Carter–Finley Stadium; Raleigh, NC (rivalry)	RSN	L 6–37	52,567
November 17	3:30 p.m.	at No. 3 Notre Dame*	Notre Dame Stadium; Notre Dame, IN	NBC	L 0–38	80,795
November 24	3:30 p.m.	Vanderbilt*	BB&T Field; Winston-Salem, NC	ESPNU	L 21–55	26,134
*Non-conference game; ^{†}Homecoming; Rankings from Coaches' Poll released prior to the game; All times are in Eastern time

== Roster ==
2012 Wake Forest Demon Deacons
Offense Quarterbacks: 7 Maddox Stamey – Freshman; 8 Kevin Sousa – (redshirt) Freshman; 10 Tanner Price – Junior; 12 Brendan Cross – (redshirt) Junior; 13 Tyler Cameron – Freshman; 14 Patrick Thompson – (redshirt) Sophomore; 15 Matt Grasmeyer – (redshirt) Freshman; 17 Patrick Long – (redshirt) Freshman; Running backs: 5 Orville Reynolds – Sophomore; 20 Joshua Wilhite – Freshman; 21 Deandre Martin – (redshirt) Freshman; 25 Josh Harris – (redshirt) Junior; 29 Tyler Jackson – (redshirt) Sophomore; Fullbacks: 42 Tommy Bohanon – Senior; 44 Ben Emert – (redshirt) Sophomore; 48 Jordan Garside – (redshirt) Sophomore; Wide receivers: 2 Matt James – (redshirt) Sophomore; 3 Michael Campanaro – (redshirt) Junior; 4 Lovell Jackson – (redshirt) Senior; 11 Airyn Willis – (redshirt) Freshman; 18 Quan Rucker – (redshirt) Junior; 26 Sherman Ragland III – (redshirt) Freshman; 81 Terence Davis – (redshirt) Senior; 82 P.J. Howard IV – (redshirt) Freshman; 83 Jonathan Williams – Freshman; 86 Brandon Terry – (redshirt) Sophomore; 87 Brad Idzik – (redshirt) Sophomore; 88 Jared Krump – Freshman; Tight ends: 80 Tyler Rook – Freshman; 84 Zach Gordon – Freshman; 85 Neil Basford – (redshirt) Sophomore; 89 Spencer Bishop – (redshirt) Junior; Offensive Linemen: 59 Antonio Ford – (redshirt) Sophomore; 60 Whit Barnes – (redshirt) Junior; 62 Joel Suggs – Freshman; 63 Dylan Intemann – (redshirt) Freshman; 67 Will Smith – Freshman; 68 Colin Summers – (redshirt) Sophomore; 69 Ramon Booi – (redshirt) Senior; 70 Dylan Heartsill – (redshirt) Sophomore; 71 Hunter Goodwin – (redshirt) Freshman; 72 Cody Preble – (redshirt) Freshman; 73 Steven Chase – (redshirt) Junior; 74 Garrick Williams – (redshirt) Senior; 75 Frank Souza – (redshirt) Junior; 77 Devin Bolling – (redshirt) Junior; 78 Tyler Hayworth – Freshman; 79 Gabe Irby – (redshirt) Senior	Defense Defensive ends: 36 Tylor Harris – Freshman; 49 Derricus Ellis – (redshirt) Senior; 51 Daniel Vogelsang – (redshirt) Sophomore; 58 Josh Banks – Freshman; 90 Kris Redding – (redshirt) Junior; 91 John Gallagher – (redshirt) Junior; 91 Johnny Garcia – (redshirt) Sophomore; 94 Desmond Floyd – (redshirt) Freshman; 96 Hasan Hazime – Graduate Student; 98 Zach Thompson – (redshirt) Junior; 99 Gods-Power Offor – (redshirt) Freshman; Defensive tackles: 50 Nikita Whitlock – (redshirt) Junior; 92 Bryson Dunmeyer – (redshirt) Senior; 95 Shelldon Lewinson – Freshman; Linebackers: 28 Jharrison Gillespie – Senior; 30 Hunter Williams – (redshirt) Freshman; 32 Scott Betros – (redshirt) Senior; 35 Zachary Allen – (redshirt) Sophomore; 39 Justin Jackson – (redshirt) Junior; 40 Joey Ehrmann – (redshirt) Senior; 41 Mike Olson – (redshirt) Junior; 45 Riley Haynes – (redshirt) Senior; 46 Steve Donatell – Freshman; 48 Brandon Chubb – (redshirt) Freshman; 53 Jordan Pineda – (redshirt) Freshman; 56 Teddy Matthews – Freshman; 57 Patrick Doran – (redshirt) Sophomore; 64 Britt Cherry – (redshirt) Freshman; Cornerbacks: 6 Chibuikem Okoro – (redshirt) Senior; 7 Merrill Noel – (redshirt) Sophomore; 9 Kevin Johnson – Junior; 14 Jason Green – Senior; 15 Allen Ramsey – (redshirt) Freshman; 17 A.J. Marshall – Junior; 23 James Ward – Freshman; Safeties: 5 Daniel Mack – (redshirt) Junior; 11 Joe LaBarbera – (redshirt) Sophomore; 18 Josh Strickland – (redshirt) Junior; 22 Dominique Gibson – Freshman; 34 Duran Lowe – (redshirt) Junior	Special teams Placekickers: 27 Chad Hedlund – (redshirt) Freshman; 37 Hunter Haire – Freshman; 82 Jimmy Newman – Senior; Punters: 24 Alex Wulfeck – Senior; 38 Alexander Kinal – (redshirt) Freshman; Long Snappers: 52 Logan Feimster – (redshirt) Sophomore; 55 Brad Demuth – Freshman; 61 Ryan Bauder – (redshirt) Freshman; Kick returners: 4 Lovell Jackson – (redshirt) Senior; 5 Orville Reynolds – Sophomore; 6 Chibuikem Okoro – (redshirt) Senior; 21 Deandre Martin – (redshirt) Freshman; 25 Josh Harris – (redshirt) Junior; Punt Returners: 3 Michael Campanaro – (redshirt) Junior; 4 Lovell Jackson – (redshirt) Senior

== Coaching staff ==
Position	Name	First year at WFU
Head coach	Jim Grobe	2001
Secondary	Tim Duffie	2012
Passing Game Co-Coordinator/quarterbacks	Tom Elrod	2003
Passing Game Co-Coordinator/wide receivers	Lonnie Galloway	2011
Offensive Line	Jonathan Himebauch	2012
Outside Linebackers	Derrick Jackson	2012
Co-defensive coordinator/linebackers	Brian Knorr	2008
Offensive coordinator/offensive line	Steed Lobotzke	2001
Recruiting coordinator/defensive tackles	Ray McCartney	2001
Associate head coach/Running backs/kickers	Billy Mitchell	2001
Source: http://wakeforestsports.cstv.com/sports/m-footbl/mtt/wake-m-footbl-mtt.html

== Game summaries ==
=== Liberty ===
2nd meeting. 1–0 all time. Last meeting 2006, 34–14 Demon Deacons in Winston-Salem.

Week One: Liberty Flames at Wake Forest Demon Deacons – Game summary

Quarter	1	2	3	4	Total
Flames	7	0	7	3	17
Demon Deacons	0	7	7	6	20

at BB&T Field, Winston-Salem, North Carolina

- Date: September 1
- Game time: 6:30 p.m. EST
- Game weather: 77° F
- Game attendance: 27,652
- Referee: Jerry Magallanes
- TV announcers (ESPN3): Ryan Rose and Stan Lewter
- Final Stats

Game information

First quarter

- LIB – Elliott Dutra 37-yard pass from Brian Hudson (John Lunsford kick), 8:01. Flames 7–0. Drive: 3 plays, 44 yards, 0:22.

Second quarter

- WFU – Michael Campanaro 31-yard pass from Tanner Price (Jimmy Newman kick), 7:15. Tied 7–7. Drive: 6 plays, 65 yards, 2:41.

Third quarter

- LIB – Sirchauncey Holloway 14-yard pass from Brian Hudson (John Lunsford kick), 10:51. Flames 14–7. Drive: 8 plays, 75 yards, 4:09.
- WFU – A.J. Marshall 39-yard interception return (Jimmy Newman kick), 4:16. Tied 14–14.

Fourth quarter

- WFU – Deandre Martin 2-yard run (2pt conversion failed), 13:24. Demon Deacons 20–14. Drive: 9 plays, 60 yards, 4:19.
- LIB – John Lunsford 49-yard field goal, 9:39. Demon Deacons 20-17. Drive: 9 plays, 34 yards, 3:45.

Leading Passers

- LIB – B. Hudson 20/37 Comp/Att 263 Yds, 2 TD, 1 Int
- WFU – T. Price 16/28 Comp/Att 195 Yds, 1 TD, 1 Int

Leading Rushers

- LIB – S. Holloway 17 Rushes 53 Yds. 3.1 Avg 15 Lng. 0 TD
- WFU – D. Martin 21 Rushes 74 Yds. 3.5 Avg 13 Lng. 1 TD

Leading Receivers

- LIB – J. Gunn 3 Rec. 66 Yds. 22.0 Avg 47 Lng. 0 TD
- WFU – M. Campanaro 9 Rec. 96 Yds. 10.7 Avg 31 Lng. 1 TD

Leading Tacklers

- LIB – W. Aikens 5 Tack 1 Ast 0 Sack
- WFU – R. Haynes 8 Tack 2 Ast 1 Sack

=== North Carolina ===
105th meeting. 34–68–2 all time. Last meeting 2011, 49–24 Tar Heels in Chapel Hill.

Week Two: North Carolina Tar Heels at Wake Forest Demon Deacons – Game summary

Quarter	1	2	3	4	Total
Tar Heels	7	7	10	3	27
Demon Deacons	7	14	0	7	28

at BB&T Field, Winston-Salem, North Carolina

- Date: September 8
- Game time: 4:15 p.m. EST (game delayed 75 minutes due to inclement weather)
- Game weather: 71° F
- Game attendance: 29,256
- Referee: Gary Patterson
- TV announcers (RSN): Paul Kennedy, Keith Jones, and Jenn Hildreth
- Final Stats

Game information

First quarter

- UNC – Eric Ebron 6-yard pass from Bryn Renner (Casey Barth kick), 5:49. Tar Heels 7–0. Drive: 8 plays, 80 yards, 2:21.
- WFU – Tanner Price 2-yard run (Jimmy Newman kick), 0:02. Tied 7-7. Drive: 10 plays, 72 yards, 5:41.

Second quarter

- UNC – A.J. Blue 1-yard run (Casey Barth kick), 10:05. Tar Heels 14–7. Drive: 14 plays, 79 yards, 4:55.
- WFU – Deandre Martin 4-yard run (Jimmy Newman kick), 6:07. Tied 14-14. Drive: 9 plays, 83 yards, 3:52.
- WFU – Josh Harris 6-yard run (Jimmy Newman kick), 4:31. Demon Deacons 21-14. Drive: 3 plays, 20 yards, 1:05.

Third quarter

- UNC – Romar Morris 4-yard run (Casey Barth kick), 4:45. Tied 21-21. Drive: 12 plays, 73 yards, 3:25.
- UNC – Casey Barth 25-yard field goal, 2:50. Tar Heels 24-21. Drive: 4 plays, 0 yards, 1:41.

Fourth quarter

- UNC – Casey Barth 25-yard field goal, 12:50. Tar Heels 27-21. Drive: 9 plays, 71 yards, 2:11.
- WFU – Tanner Price 1-yard run (Jimmy Newman kick), 2:09. Demon Deacons 28-27. Drive: 11 plays, 93 yards, 4:27.

Leading Passers

- UNC – B. Renner 23/39 Comp/Att 271 Yds, 1 TD, 1 Int
- WFU – T. Price 27/38 Comp/Att 327 Yds, 0 TD, 1 Int

Leading Rushers

- UNC – A. Blue 19 Rushes 106 Yds. 5.6 Avg 28 Lng. 1 TD
- WFU – J. Harris 21 Rushes 40 Yds. 1.9 Avg 9 Lng. 1 TD

Leading Receivers

- UNC – E. Highsmith 5 Rec. 71 Yds. 14.2 Avg 28 Lng. 0 TD
- WFU – M. Campanaro 13 Rec. 164 Yds. 12.6 Avg 23 Lng. 0 TD

Leading Tacklers

- UNC – T. Boston 5 Tack 6 Ast 0 Sack
- WFU – J. Jackson 5 Tack 4 Ast 1 Sack

=== Florida State ===
31st meeting. 6–23–1 all time. Last meeting 2011, 35–30 Demon Deacons in Winston-Salem.

Week Three: Wake Forest Demon Deacon at Florida State Seminoles – Game summary

Quarter	1	2	3	4	Total
Demon Deacons	0	0	0	0	0
#6 Seminoles	14	24	7	7	52

at Doak Campbell Stadium, Tallahassee, Florida

- Date: September 15
- Game time: 12:00 p.m. EST
- Game weather: 83° F
- Game attendance: 68,833
- Referee: David Epperley
- TV announcers (ESPN): Dave Pasch, Brian Griese, and Jenn Brown
- Final Stats

Game information

First quarter

- FSU – EJ Manuel 16-yard run (Dustin Hopkins kick), 4:28. Seminoles 7–0. Drive: 3 plays, 47 yards, 0:54.
- FSU – Rashad Greene 60-yard punt return (Dustin Hopkins kick), 2:45. Seminoles 14–0.

Second quarter

- FSU – Chris Thompson 74-yard run (Dustin Hopkins kick), 12:52. Seminoles 21–0. Drive: 2 plays, 95 yards, 0:31.
- FSU – Chris Thompson 80-yard run (Dustin Hopkins kick), 9:42. Seminoles 28–0. Drive: 1 plays, 80 yards, 0:12.
- FSU – Dustin Hopkins 19-yard field goal (Dustin Hopkins kick), 4:37. Seminoles 31–0. Drive: 8 plays, 31 yards, 3:23.
- FSU – Rodney Smith 20-yard pass from EJ Manuel (Dustin Hopkins kick), 0:14. Seminoles 38–0. Drive: 6 plays, 44 yards, 0:53.

Third quarter

- FSU – Kenny Shaw 17-yard pass from EJ Manuel (Dustin Hopkins kick), 0:44. Seminoles 45–0. Drive: 13 plays, 80 yards, 5:34.

Fourth quarter

- FSU – Debrale Smiley 18-yard run (Dustin Hopkins kick), 12:21. Seminoles 52–0. Drive: 5 plays, 53 yards, 1:50.

Leading Passers

- WFU – T. Price 8/22 Comp/Att 82 Yds, 0 TD, 0 Int
- FSU – E. Manuel 15/24 Comp/Att 176 Yds, 2 TD, 0 Int

Leading Rushers

- WFU – J. Harris 15 Rushes 51 Yds. 3.4 Avg 34 Lng. 0 TD
- FSU – C. Thompson 7 Rushes 197 Yds. 21.9 Avg 80 Lng. 2 TD

Leading Receivers

- WFU – S. Ragland III 2 Rec. 48 Yds. 24.0 Avg 41 Lng. 0 TD
- FSU – K. Benjamin 4 Rec. 44 Yds. 11.0 Avg 18 Lng. 0 TD

Leading Tacklers

- WFU – B. Chubb 6 Tack 1 Ast 0 Sack
- FSU – C. Jones 4 Tack 2 Ast 0 Sack

=== Army ===
12th meeting. 7–4 all time. Last meeting 2007, 21–10 Demon Deacons in Winston-Salem.

Week Four: Army Black Knights at Wake Forest Demon Deacons – Game summary

Quarter	1	2	3	4	Total
Black Knights	13	10	14	0	37
Demon Deacons	14	7	21	7	49

at BB&T Field, Winston-Salem, North Carolina

- Date: September 22
- Game time: 12:30 p.m. EST
- Game weather: 77° F
- Game attendance: 30,207
- Referee: Brad Allen
- TV announcers (ACC Network): Steve Martin, David Archer, and Mike Hogewood
- Final Stats

Game information

First quarter

- ARMY – Trent Steelman 2-yard run (Kick blocked), 11:40. Black Knights 6–0. Drive: 8 plays, 75 yards, 3:20.
- WFU – Michael Campanaro 4-yard run (Jimmy Newman kick), 7:34. Demon Deacons 7-6. Drive: 9 plays, 82 yards, 4:00.
- ARMY – Larry Dixon 12-yard run (Daniel Grochowski kick), 4:23. Black Knights 13–7. Drive: 7 plays, 75 yards, 3:11.
- WFU – Michael Campanaro 41-yard pass from Tanner Price (Jimmy Newman kick), 0:51. Demon Deacons 14–13. Drive: 7 plays, 75 yards, 3:32.

Second quarter

- ARMY – Trent Steelman 1-yard run (Daniel Grochowski kick), 11:41. Black Knights 20–14. Drive: 11 plays, 73 yards, 4:10.
- WFU – Michael Campanaro 7-yard pass from Tanner Price (Jimmy Newman kick), 4:29. Demon Deacons 21–20. Drive: 9 plays, 79 yards, 3:19.
- ARMY – Daniel Grochowski 21-yard field goal, 0:00. Black Knights 23-21. Drive: 15 plays, 63 yards, 4:24.

Third quarter

- WFU – Josh Harris 19-yard run (Jimmy Newman kick), 12:05. Demon Deacons 28-23. Drive: 7 plays, 75 yards, 2:55.
- WFU – Deandre Martin 10-yard run (Jimmy Newman kick), 10:14. Demon Deacons 35-23. Drive: 3 plays, 25 yards, 1:09.
- ARMY – Trent Steelman 2-yard run (Daniel Grochowski kick), 6:31. Demon Deacons 35-30. Drive: 9 plays, 75 yards, 3:43.
- WFU – Josh Harris 63-yard run (Jimmy Newman kick), 5:19. Demon Deacons 42-30. Drive: 4 plays, 75 yards, 1:12.
- ARMY – Raymond Maples 13-yard pass from Trent Steelman (Daniel Grochowski kick), 2:07. Demon Deacons 42-37. Drive: 9 plays, 75 yards, 3:12.

Fourth quarter

- WFU – Deandre Martin 37-yard run (Jimmy Newman kick), 2:50. Demon Deacons 49-37. Drive: 9 plays, 68 yards, 3:00.

Leading Passers

- ARMY – T. Steelman 3/4 Comp/Att 77 Yds, 1 TD, 0 Int
- WFU – T. Price 15/24 Comp/Att 221 Yds, 2 TD, 0 Int

Leading Rushers

- ARMY – R. Maples 15 Rushes 140 Yds. 9.3 Avg 33 Lng. 0 TD
- WFU – J. Harris 12 Rushes 129 Yds. 10.8 Avg 63 Lng. 2 TD

Leading Receivers

- ARMY – C. Lawrence 1 Rec. 45 Yds. 45.0 Avg 45 Lng. 0 TD
- WFU – M. Campanaro 12 Rec. 153 Yds. 12.8 Avg 41 Lng. 2 TD

Leading Tacklers

- ARMY – B. Fusilier-Jeffires 10 Tack 5 Ast 0 Sack
- WFU – Z. Thompson 7 Tack 5 Ast 0 Sack

=== Duke ===
93rd meeting. 37–53–2 all time. Last meeting 2011, 24–23 Demon Deacons in Durham.

Week Five: Duke Blue Devils at Wake Forest Demon Deacons – Game summary

Quarter	1	2	3	4	Total
Blue Devils	10	3	7	14	34
Demon Deacons	7	3	10	7	27

at BB&T Field, Winston-Salem, North Carolina

- Date: September 29
- Game time: 12:30 p.m. EST
- Game weather: 68° F
- Game attendance: 28,743
- Referee: Tom Zimorski
- TV announcers (ACC Network): Steve Martin, David Archer, and Mike Hogewood
- Final Stats

Game information

First quarter

- DUKE – Ross Martin 35-yard field goal, 10:28. Blue Devils 3-0. Drive: 7 plays, 62 yards, 3:07.
- WFU – Deandre Martin 4-yard run (Jimmy Newman kick), 5:16. Demon Deacons 7-3. Drive: 11 plays, 75 yards, 5:12.
- DUKE – Brandon Connette 2-yard run (Ross Martin kick), 0:06. Blue Devils 10-7. Drive: 13 plays, 70 yards, 5:02.

Second quarter

- DUKE – Ross Martin 22-yard field goal, 10:20. Blue Devils 13-7. Drive: 9 plays, 29 yards, 3:46.
- WFU – Jimmy Newman 45-yard field goal, 6:49. Blue Devils 13-10. Drive: 7 plays, 47 yards, 3:31.

Third quarter

- DUKE – Brandon Connette 4-yard run (Ross Martin kick), 9:12. Blue Devils 20-10. Drive: 12 plays, 75 yards, 5:48.
- WFU – Tommy Bohanon 34-yard pass from Tanner Price (Jimmy Newman kick), 2:26. Blue Devils 20–17. Drive: 9 plays, 98 yards, 3:47.
- WFU – Jimmy Newman 28-yard field goal, 0:17. Tied 20-20. Drive: 4 plays, 9 yards, 1:55.

Fourth quarter

- DUKE – Anthony Boone 4-yard run (Ross Martin kick), 11:35. Blue Devils 27-20. Drive: 2 plays, 8 yards, 0:36.
- DUKE – Jela Duncan 17-yard run (Ross Martin kick), 2:50. Blue Devils 34-20. Drive: 7 plays, 38 yards, 3:09.
- WFU – Tommy Bohanon 4-yard pass from Tanner Price (Jimmy Newman kick), 0:42. Blue Devils 34-27. Drive: 16 plays, 75 yards, 2:08.

Leading Passers

- DUKE – S. Renfree 22/28 Comp/Att 204 Yds, 0 TD, 1 Int
- WFU – T. Price 19/38 Comp/Att 230 Yds, 2 TD, 2 Int

Leading Rushers

- DUKE – J. Duncan 11 Rushes 56 Yds. 5.1 Avg 17 Lng. 1 TD
- WFU – J. Harris 17 Rushes 84 Yds. 4.9 Avg 27 Lng. 0 TD

Leading Receivers

- DUKE – D. Scott 11 Rec. 134 Yds. 12.2 Avg 35 Lng. 0 TD
- WFU – T. Davis 6 Rec. 100 Yds. 16.7 Avg 44 Lng. 0 TD

Leading Tacklers

- DUKE – J. Byas 6 Tack 5 Ast 0.5 Sack
- WFU – M. Olson 5 Tack 8 Ast 0 Sack

=== Maryland ===
61st meeting. 17–42–1 all time. Last meeting 2011, 31–10 Demon Deacons in Winston-Salem.

Week Six: Wake Forest Demon Deacons at Maryland Terrapins – Game summary

Quarter	1	2	3	4	Total
Demon Deacons	7	0	7	0	14
Terrapins	6	7	0	6	19

at Byrd Stadium, College Park, Maryland

- Date: October 6
- Game time: 3:30 p.m. EST
- Game weather: 66° F
- Game attendance: 40,391
- Referee: David Epperley
- TV announcers (ESPNU): Anish Shroff, and Dan Hawkins
- Final Stats

Game information

First quarter

- WFU – Terence Davis 73-yard pass from Tanner Price (Jimmy Newman kick), 14:07. Demon Deacons 7-0. Drive: 3 plays, 75 yards, 0:53.
- MD – Brad Craddock 49-yard field goal, 10:17. Demon Deacons 7-3. Drive: 9 plays, 28 yards, 3:49.
- MD – Brad Craddock 52-yard field goal, 1:47. Demon Deacons 7-6. Drive: 4 plays, 1 yard, 2:13.

Second quarter

- MD – Kevin Dorsey 33-yard pass from Perry Hills (Brad Craddock kick), 2:19. Terrapins 13-7. Drive: 7 plays, 75 yards, 2:27.

Third quarter

- WFU – Tommy Bohanon 7-yard pass from Tanner Price (Chad Hedlund kick), 7:06. Demon Deacons 14-13. Drive: 5 plays, 24 yards, 2:12.

Fourth quarter

- MD – Justus Pickett 1-yard run (kick failed), 5:37. Terrapins 19-14. Drive: 5 plays, 58 yards, 3:01.

Leading Passers

- WFU – T. Price 13/38 Comp/Att 170 Yds, 2 TD, 0 Int
- MD – P. Hills 14/25 Comp/Att 191 Yds, 1 TD, 1 Int

Leading Rushers

- WFU – J. Harris 18 Rushes 73 Yds. 4.1 Avg 13 Lng. 0 TD
- MD – W. Brown 10 Rushes 23 Yds. 2.3 Avg 8 Lng. 0 TD

Leading Receivers

- WFU – T. Davis 7 Rec. 130 Yds. 18.6 Avg 73 Lng. 1 TD
- MD – S. Diggs 5 Rec. 105 Yds. 21.0 Avg 63 Lng. 0 TD

Leading Tacklers

- WFU – D. Lowe 4 Tack 5 Ast 0 Sack
- MD – D. Hartsfield 7 Tack 3 Ast 1 Sack

=== Virginia ===
48th meeting. 13–34–0 all time. Last meeting 2008, 28–17 Demon Deacons in Winston-Salem.

Week Eight: Wake Forest Demon Deacons at Virginia Cavaliers – Game summary

Quarter	1	2	3	4	Total
Demon Deacons	7	3	6	0	16
Cavaliers	0	7	3	0	10

at Scott Stadium, Charlottesville, Virginia

- Date: October 20
- Game time: 12:30 p.m. EST
- Game weather: 64° F
- Game attendance: 41,167
- Referee: Walt Davenport
- TV announcers (ACC Network): Steve Martin, David Archer, and Mike Hogewood
- Final Stats

Game information

First quarter

- WFU – Josh Harris 16-yard run (Chad Hedlund kick), 12:02. Demon Deacons 7-0. Drive: 1 plays, 16 yards, 0:06.

Second quarter

- UVA – Tim Smith 13-yard pass from Phillip Sims (Ian Frye kick), 0:20. Tied 7-7. Drive: 13 plays, 72 yards, 2:48.
- WFU – Chad Hedlund 22-yard field goal, 0:03. Demon Deacons 10-7. Drive: 2 plays, 41 yards, 0:17.

Third quarter

- WFU – Chad Hedlund 44-yard field goal, 11:47. Demon Deacons 13-7. Drive: 10 plays, 55 yards, 3:13.
- WFU – Chad Hedlund 24-yard field goal, 4:15. Demon Deacons 16-7. Drive: 10 plays, 30 yards, 3:45.
- WFU – Ian Frye 30-yard field goal, 0:43. Demon Deacons 16-10. Drive: 8 plays, 62 yards, 3:32.

Fourth quarter

Leading Passers

- WFU – T. Price 7/19 Comp/Att 102 Yds, 0 TD, 0 Int
- UVA – P. Sims 22/39 Comp/Att 253 Yds, 1 TD, 1 Int

Leading Rushers

- WFU – J. Harris 14 Rushes 55 Yds. 3.9 Avg 16 Lng. 1 TD
- UVA – K. Parks 10 Rushes 28 Yds. 2.8 Avg 6 Lng. 0 TD

Leading Receivers

- WFU – B. Terry 1 Rec. 41 Yds. 41.0 Avg 41 Lng. 0 TD
- UVA – T. Smith 4 Rec. 79 Yds. 19.8 Avg 56 Lng. 1 TD

Leading Tacklers

- WFU – Z. Thompson 4 Tack 4 Ast 1.5 Sack
- UVA – S. Greer 6 Tack 8 Ast 0 Sack

=== Clemson ===
78th meeting. 17–59–1 all time. Last meeting 2011, 31–28 Tigers in Clemson.

Week Nine: Clemson Tigers at Wake Forest Demon Deacons – Game summary

Quarter	1	2	3	4	Total
#13 Tigers	7	28	0	7	42
Demon Deacons	0	7	6	0	13

at BB&T Field, Winston-Salem, North Carolina

- Date: October 25
- Game time: 7:30 p.m. EST
- Game weather: 69° F
- Game attendance: 31,162
- Referee: Jerry Magallane
- TV announcers (ESPN): Rece Davis, Jesse Palmer, David Pollack, and Samantha Steele
- Final Stats

Game information

First quarter

- CLM – Brandon Ford 9-yard pass from Tajh Boyd (Chandler Catanzaro kick), 4:03. Tigers 7-0. Drive: 8 plays, 80 yards, 3:19.

Second quarter

- CLM – Sammy Watkins 61-yard pass from Tajh Boyd (Chandler Catanzaro kick), 14:49. Tigers 14-0. Drive: 5 plays, 72 yards, 1:00.
- CLM – Sam Cooper 12-yard pass from Tajh Boyd (Chandler Catanzaro kick), 8:36. Tigers 21-0. Drive: 7 plays, 80 yards, 1:51.
- CLM – DeAndre Hopkins 12-yard pass from Tajh Boyd (Chandler Catanzaro kick), 3:56. Tigers 28-0. Drive: 6 plays, 68 yards, 1:41.
- CLM – Charone Peake 2-yard pass from Tajh Boyd (Chandler Catanzaro kick), 1:18. Tigers 35-0. Drive: 4 plays, 19 yards, 1:08.
- WFU – Tommy Bohanon 8-yard pass from Tanner Price (Chad Hedlund kick), 0:12. Tigers 35-7. Drive: 6 plays, 75 yards, 1:06.

Third quarter

- WFU – Tommy Bohanon 18-yard pass from Tanner Price (kick failed), 7:45. Tigers 35-13. Drive: 4 plays, 69 yards, 0:58.
- CLM – D.J. Howard 1-yard run (handler Catanzaro kick), 8:44. Tigers 42-13. Drive: 13 plays, 86 yards, 5:02.

Fourth quarter

Leading Passers

- CLM – T. Boyd 27/38 Comp/Att 428 Yds, 5 TD, 0 Int
- WFU – T. Price 27/44 Comp/Att 232 Yds, 2 TD, 0 Int

Leading Rushers

- CLM – A. Ellington 15 Rushes 61 Yds. 4.1 Avg 12 Lng. 0 TD
- WFU – J. Harris 10 Rushes 76 Yds. 7.6 Avg 43 Lng. 0 TD

Leading Receivers

- CLM – S. Watkins 8 Rec. 202 Yds. 25.3 Avg 61 Lng. 1 TD
- WFU – T. Davis 7 Rec. 84 Yds. 12.0 Avg 25 Lng. 0 TD

Leading Tacklers

- CLM – J. Willard 5 Tack 3 Ast 1 Sack
- WFU – N. Whitlock 5 Tack 3 Ast 1 Sack

=== Boston College ===
20th meeting. 7–10–2 all time. Last meeting 2011, 27–19 Demon Deacons in Chestnut Hill.

Week Ten: Boston College Eagles at Wake Forest Demon Deacons – Game summary

Quarter	1	2	3	4	Total
Eagles	0	7	7	0	14
Demon Deacons	14	7	7	0	28

at BB&T Field, Winston-Salem, North Carolina

- Date: November 3
- Game time: 3:30 p.m. EST
- Game weather: 59° F
- Game attendance: 28,963
- Referee: Tom McCreesh
- TV announcers (RSN): Rich Waltz, Keith Jones, and Jenn Hildreth
- Final Stats

Game information

First quarter

- WFU – Michael Campanaro 5-yard pass from Tanner Price (Chad Hedlund kick), 7:39. Demon Deacons 7-0. Drive: 11 plays, 48 yards, 3:07.
- WFU – Michael Campanaro 27-yard pass from Tanner Price (Chad Hedlund kick), 1:13. Demon Deacons 14-0. Drive: 6 plays, 43 yards, 1:39.

Second quarter

- BC – Alex Amidon 16-yard pass from Chase Rettig (Nate Freese kick), 5:25. Demon Deacons 14-7. Drive: 12 plays, 95 yards, 5:31.
- WFU – Michael Campanaro 16-yard pass from Tanner Price (Chad Hedlund kick), 0:54. Demon Deacons 21-7. Drive: 5 plays, 15 yards, 2:35.

Third quarter

- BC – Chris Pantale 12-yard pass from Bobby Swigert (Nate Freese kick), 8:35. Demon Deacons 21-14. Drive: 3 plays, 67 yards, 0:57.
- WFU – Josh Harris 23-yard run (Chad Hedlund kick), 2:36. Demon Deacons 28-14. Drive: 9 plays, 74 yards, 3:50.

Fourth quarter

Leading Passers

- BC – C. Rettig 30/50 Comp/Att 359 Yds, 1 TD, 3 Int
- WFU – T. Price 39/57 Comp/Att 292 Yds, 3 TD, 1 Int

Leading Rushers

- BC – D. Dudeck 13 Rushes 30 Yds. 2.3 Avg 9 Lng. 0 TD
- WFU – J. Harris 17 Rushes 84 Yds. 4.9 Avg 23 Lng. 1 TD

Leading Receivers

- BC – A. Amidon 10 Rec. 130 Yds. 13.0 Avg 20 Lng. 1 TD
- WFU – M. Campanaro 16 Rec. 123 Yds. 7.7 Avg 27 Lng. 3 TD

Leading Tacklers

- BC – N. Clancy 6 Tack 8 Ast 0 Sack
- WFU – J. Jackson 5 Tack 4 Ast 0 Sack

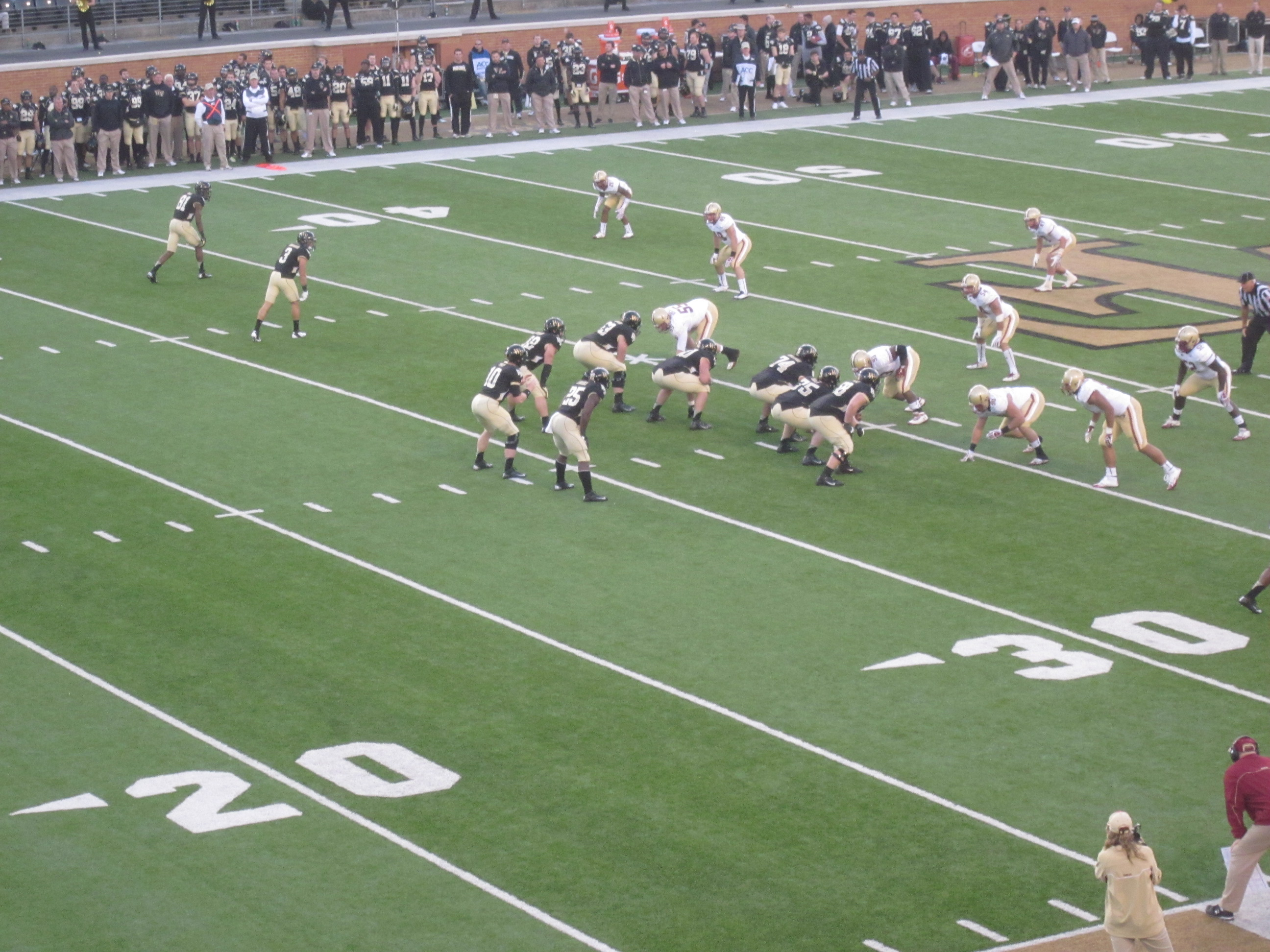
Early in the third quarter, the Demon Deacons are on offense against Boston College

=== NC State ===
106th meeting. 37–62–6 all time. Last meeting 2011, 34–27 Demon Deacons in Winston-Salem.

Week Eleven: Wake Forest Demon Deacons at NC State Wolfpack – Game summary

Quarter	1	2	3	4	Total
Demon Deacons	0	6	0	0	6
Wolfpack	17	0	17	3	37

at Carter–Finley Stadium, Raleigh, North Carolina

- Date: November 10
- Game time: 3:00 p.m. EST
- Game weather: 71° F
- Game attendance: 52,567
- Referee: Tom Zimorski
- TV announcers (RSN): Mike Hogewood, Keith Jones, and Jenn Hildreth
- Final Stats

Game information

First quarter

- NCSU – Tony Creecy 1-yard run (Niklas Sade kick), 11:19. Wolfpack 7-0. Drive: 2 plays, 31 yards, 0:16.
- NCSU – Niklas Sade 38-yard field goal, 5:54. Wolfpack 10-0. Drive: 13 plays, 52 yards, 3:13.
- NCSU – Logan Winkles 5-yard pass from Mike Glennon (Niklas Sade kick), 0:37. Wolfpack 17-0. Drive: 9 plays, 60 yards, 2:54.

Second quarter

- WFU – Terence Davis 39-yard pass from Michael Campanaro (kick failed), 10:33. Wolfpack 17-6. Drive: 1 plays, 39 yards, 0:07.

Third quarter

- NCSU – Tobais Palmer 100-yard kick return (Dustin Hopkins kick), 14:49. Wolfpack 24-6.
- NCSU – Asa Watson 26-yard pass from Mike Glennon (Niklas Sade kick), 9:23. Wolfpack 31-6. Drive: 8 plays, 69 yards, 3:35.
- NCSU – Niklas Sade 49-yard field goal, 7:51. Wolfpack 34-6. Drive: 5 plays, 14 yards, 1:03.

Fourth quarter

- NCSU – Niklas Sade 35-yard field goal, 14:15. Wolfpack 37-6. Drive: 8 plays, 16 yards, 3:43.

Leading Passers

- WFU – T. Price 18/33 Comp/Att 113 Yds, 0 TD, 1 Int
- NCSU – M. Glennon 25/41 Comp/Att 258 Yds, 2 TD, 1 Int

Leading Rushers

- WFU – D. Martin 7 Rushes 41 Yds. 5.9 Avg 15 Lng. 0 TD
- NCSU – S. Thornton 27 Rushes 110 Yds. 4.1 Avg 26 Lng. 0 TD

Leading Receivers

- WFU – T. Davis 4 Rec. 66 Yds. 16.5 Avg 39 Lng. 1 TD
- NCSU – B. Underwod 8 Rec. 76 Yds. 9.5 Avg 25 Lng. 0 TD

Leading Tacklers

- WFU – A. Marshall 5 Tack 5 Ast 0 Sack
- NCSU – R. Smith 2 Tack 5 Ast 1 Sack

=== Notre Dame ===
2nd meeting. 0–1 all time. Last meeting 2011, 24–17 Fighting Irish in Winston-Salem.

Week Twelve: Wake Forest Demon Deacons at Notre Dame Fighting Irish – Game summary

Quarter	1	2	3	4	Total
Demon Deacons	0	0	0	0	0
#3 Fighting Irish	21	10	7	0	38

at Notre Dame Stadium, Notre Dame, Indiana

- Date: November 17
- Game time: 3:30 p.m. EST
- Game weather: 54° F
- Game attendance: 80,795
- Referee: Gary Patterson
- TV announcers (NBC): Tom Hammond, Mike Mayock, and Alex Flanagan
- Final Stats

Game information

First quarter

- ND – Cierre Wood 68-yard run (Kyle Brindza kick), 13:15. Fighting Irish 7-0. Drive: 4 plays, 93 yards, 1:45.
- ND – Tyler Eifert 2-yard pass from Everett Golson (Kyle Brindza kick), 9:10. Fighting Irish 14-0. Drive: 8 plays, 52 yards, 2:51.
- ND – John Goodman 50-yard pass from Everett Golson (Kyle Brindza kick), 4:28. Fighting Irish 21-0. Drive: 6 plays, 78 yards, 2:24.

Second quarter

- ND – TJ Jones 34-yard pass from Everett Golson (Kyle Brindza kick), 6:17. Fighting Irish 28-0. Drive: 6 plays, 75 yards, 2:52.
- ND – Kyle Brindza 25-yard field goal, 1:34. Fighting Irish 31-0. Drive: 6 plays, 51 yards, 1:13.

Third quarter

- ND – George Atkinson 9-yard run (Kyle Brindza kick), 3:30. Fighting Irish 38-0. Drive: 7 plays, 80 yards, 3:44.

Fourth quarter

Leading Passers

- WFU – T. Price 22/33 Comp/Att 153 Yds, 0 TD, 0 Int
- ND – E. Golson 20/30 Comp/Att 346 Yds, 3 TD, 1 Int

Leading Rushers

- WFU – D. Martin 16 Rushes 41 Yds. 2.6 Avg 6 Lng. 0 TD
- ND – C. Wood 11 Rushes 150 Yds. 13.6 Avg 68 Lng. 1 TD

Leading Receivers

- WFU – M. Campanaro 6 Rec. 47 Yds. 7.8 Avg 16 Lng. 0 TD
- ND – T. Jones 6 Rec. 97 Yds. 16.2 Avg 34 Lng. 1 TD

Leading Tacklers

- WFU – A. Marshall 6 Tack 2 Ast 0 Sack
- ND – C. Calabrese 4 Tack 3 Ast 0 Sack

=== Vanderbilt ===
15th meeting. 6–8 all time. Last meeting 2011, 41–7 Commodores in Winston-Salem.

Week Thirteen: Vanderbilt Commodores at Wake Forest Demon Deacons – Game summary

Quarter	1	2	3	4	Total
Commodores	7	21	13	14	55
Demon Deacons	7	0	7	7	21

at BB&T Field, Winston-Salem, North Carolina

- Date: November 24
- Game time: 3:30 p.m. EST
- Game weather: 47° F
- Game attendance: 26,134
- Referee: David Smith
- TV announcers (ESPNU): Anish Shroff, and Dan Hawkins
- Final Stats

Game information

First quarter

- VAN – Wesley Tate 25-yard pass from Jordan Rodgers (Carey Spear kick), 9:40. Commodores 7-0. Drive: 11 plays, 85 yards, 5:20.
- WFU – Tommy Bohanon 1-yard run (Chad Hedlund kick), 2:26. Tied 7-7. Drive: 16 plays, 71 yards, 7:10.

Second quarter

- VAN – Wesley Tate 15-yard run (Carey Spear kick), 7:38. Commodores 14-7. Drive: 5 plays, 45 yards, 2:03.
- VAN – Jordan Matthews 64-yard pass from Jordan Rodgers (Carey Spear kick), 4:53. Commodores 21-7. Drive: 1 plays, 64 yards, 0:11.
- VAN – Zac Stacy 4-yard run (Carey Spear kick), 1:03. Commodores 28-7. Drive: 5 plays, 37 yards, 2:25.

Third quarter

- VAN – Casey Hughes 0-yard punt return (Carey Spear kick), 14:08. Commodores 35-7.
- WFU – Deandre Martin 1-yard run (Chad Hedlund kick), 9:09. Commodores 35-14. Drive: 11 plays, 75 yards, 4:59.
- VAN – Carey Spear 52-yard field goal, 4:15. Commodores 38-14. Drive: 11 plays, 41 yards, 4:48.
- VAN – Carey Spear 50-yard field goal, 0:21. Commodores 41-14. Drive: 4 plays, 1 yards, 2:06.

Fourth quarter

- VAN – Jonathan Krause 83-yard punt return (Carey Spear kick), 11:48. Commodores 48-14.
- VAN – Zac Stacy 90-yard run (Carey Spear kick), 8:56. Commodores 55-14. Drive: 2 plays, 91 yards, 0:48.
- WFU – Chibuikem Okoro 4-yard fumble return (Chad Hedlund kick), 6:28. Commodores 55-21.

Leading Passers

- VAN – J. Rodgers 17/23 Comp/Att 229 Yds, 2 TD, 1 Int
- WFU – T. Price 17/36 Comp/Att 182 Yds, 0 TD, 1 Int

Leading Rushers

- VAN – Z. Stacy 21 Rushes 180 Yds. 8.6 Avg 90 Lng. 2 TD
- WFU – D. Martin 24 Rushes 72 Yds. 3.0 Avg 12 Lng. 1 TD

Leading Receivers

- VAN – J. Matthews 10 Rec. 144 Yds. 14.4 Avg 64 Lng. 1 TD
- WFU – M. Campanaro 8 Rec. 98 Yds. 12.3 Avg 25 Lng. 0 TD

Leading Tacklers

- VAN – J. Marshall 7 Tack 1 Ast 0 Sack
- WFU – C. Okoro 9 Tack 0 Ast 0 Sack

== Statistics ==
=== Scores by quarter ===
	1	2	3	4	Total
Wake Forest	63	54	71	34	222
Opponents	109	124	92	57	382

=== Offense ===
==== Rushing ====
Name	GP	Att	Yards	Avg	TD	Long	Avg/G
Josh Harris	11	137	608	4.4	5	63	55.3
Deandre Martin	12	128	484	3.8	6	37	40.3
Michael Campanaro	10	16	82	5.1	1	14	8.2
Tyler Jackson	5	11	36	3.3	0	13	7.2
Brendan Cross	4	2	27	13.5	0	18	6.8
Lovell Jackson	12	6	24	4.0	0	8	2.0
Ben Emert	5	1	1	1.0	0	1	0.2
Tommy Bohanon	12	2	1	0.5	1	1	0.1
Sherman Ragland III	11	1	0	0.0	0	0	0.0
Terence Davis	11	2	0	0.0	0	3	0.0
Kevin Sousa	2	2	-1	-0.5	0	3	-0.5
Patrick Thompson	3	1	-2	-2.0	0	-2	-0.7
Orville Reynolds	9	5	-6	-1.2	0	1	-0.7
TEAM	10	11	-22	-2.0	0	0	-2.2
Tanner Price	12	77	-26	-0.3	2	25	-2.2
Demon Deacons Total	12	402	1,206	3.0	15	63	100.5
Opponents	12	489	1,993	4.1	22	90	166.1

==== Passing ====
Name	GP	Cmp–Att	Pct	Yds	TD	INT	Lng	Avg/G	RAT
Tanner Price	12	228-410	55.6	2,300	12	7	73	191.7	108.98
Patrick Thompson	3	5-6	83.3	21	0	0	21	7.0	112.73
Brendan Cross	4	2-6	33.3	2	0	0	4	0.5	36.13
Deandre Martin	12	3-4	75.0	48	0	0	35	4.0	175.80
Michael Campanaro	10	1-1	100.0	39	1	0	39	3.9	757.60
Demon Deacons Total	12	239-427	56.0	2,410	13	7	73	200.8	110.15
Opponents	12	255-411	62.0	3,201	22	11	64	266.8	139.78

==== Receiving ====
Name	GP	Rec	Yds	Avg	TD	Long	Avg/G
Michael Campanaro	10	79	763	9.7	6	41	76.3
Terence Davis	11	43	544	12.7	2	73	49.5
Sherman Ragland III	11	23	247	10.7	0	41	22.5
Tommy Bohanon	12	23	208	9.0	5	34	17.3
Josh Harris	11	19	96	5.1	0	21	8.7
Deandre Martin	12	16	135	8.4	0	36	11.2
Brandon Terry	12	15	290	19.3	0	47	24.2
Lovell Jackson	12	11	90	8.2	0	25	7.5
Spencer Bishop	12	3	26	8.7	0	13	2.2
Tanner Price	12	2	13	6.5	0	7	1.1
Orville Reynolds	9	2	-4	-2.0	0	0	-0.4
Matt James	4	1	3	3.0	0	3	0.8
Tyler Jackson	5	1	1	1.0	0	1	0.2
Gabe Irby	11	1	-2	-2.0	0	0	-0.2
Demon Deacons Total	12	239	2,410	10.1	13	73	200.8
Opponents	12	255	3,201	12.6	22	64	266.8

==== Scoring ====
Name	TD	FG	PAT	2PT PAT	SAFETY	TOT PTS
Michael Campanaro	7					42
Deandre Martin	6					36
Tommy Bohanon	6					36
Josh Harris	5					30
Jimmy Newman		2-6	17-17			23
Chad Hedlund		3-3	10-11			19
Tanner Price	2					12
Terence Davis	2					12
Chibuikem Okoro	1					6
AJ Marshall	1					6
TEAM			0-1			0
Alex Wulfeck				0-1		0
Demon Deacons Total	30	5-9	27-29	0-1		222
Opponents	48	16-24	46-48			382
