= 2012 Virginia Cavaliers football team =

American college football season

2012 Virginia Cavaliers football
- Conference: Atlantic Coast Conference
- Coastal Division
- Record: 4–8 (2–6 ACC)
- Head coach: Mike London (3rd season)
- Offensive coordinator: Bill Lazor (3rd season)
- Offensive scheme: Pro-style
- Defensive coordinator: Jim Reid (3rd season)
- Base defense: 4–3
- Home stadium: Scott Stadium

2012 Atlantic Coast Conference football standings
	Conf.			Overall
Team	W		L	W		L
Atlantic Division
No. 10 Florida State xy$	7	–	1	12	–	2
No. 11 Clemson x	7	–	1	11	–	2
NC State	4	–	4	7	–	6
Wake Forest	3	–	5	5	–	7
Maryland	2	–	6	4	–	8
Boston College	1	–	7	2	–	10
Coastal Division
Georgia Tech xy	5	–	3	7	–	7
North Carolina†	5	–	3	8	–	4
Miami (FL)‡	5	–	3	7	–	5
Virginia Tech	4	–	4	7	–	6
Duke	3	–	5	6	–	7
Virginia	2	–	6	4	–	8
Championship: Florida State 21, Georgia Tech 15
$ – BCS representative as conference champion; x – Division champion/co-champions; y – Championship game participant; † North Carolina ineligible for ACC title, championship game, and bowl game due to NCAA sanctions. ‡ Miami ineligible for ACC title, championship game, and bowl game due to self-imposed sanctions.; Rankings from AP Poll

The 2012 Virginia Cavaliers football team represented the University of Virginia in the 2012 NCAA Division I FBS football season. The Cavaliers were led by third year head coach Mike London and played their home games at Scott Stadium. They were members of the Coastal Division of the Atlantic Coast Conference. The team started out 2-0 for the second consecutive season after victories over Richmond and Penn State. The Cavaliers then proceeded to lose six straight games, their longest losing streak since 2009. The team bounced back with impressive victories over NC State and Miami, and then were eliminated from bowl eligibility when North Carolina handed them their seventh loss. The Cavaliers ended the season with a close loss to rival Virginia Tech and finished 4–8.

== Previous season ==
The Cavaliers went 8–5 in 2011, their first winning season under head coach Mike London. The Cavaliers followed a slow 3–2 start with a 5–2 finish that saw the team win against Florida State in Doak Campbell Stadium in November, and halt a three-year skid against Duke. The Cavaliers could not end their drought against Virginia Tech, but finished second in the ACC Coastal Division and third in the ACC overall. They were selected to represent the ACC in the Chick-fil-A Bowl against Auburn.

== Personnel ==
2012 Virginia Cavaliers football team roster
Players
Coaches
Offense

Pos.	#	Name	Class
QB		Mike Rocco
QB		Phillip Simms

Defense

Pos.	#	Name	Class

Special teams

Pos.	#	Name	Class

Head coach

- Mike London

Coordinators/assistant coaches

Legend

- (C) Team captain
- (S) Suspended
- (I) Ineligible
- Injured
- Redshirt

== Coaching staff ==
Name	Position	Seasons at Virginia	Alma mater
Mike London	Head coach	2	Richmond (1982)
Jim Reid	Associate head coach, Defensive coordinator	2	Maine (1973)
Bill Lazor	Offensive coordinator, Quarterbacks	2	Cornell (1994)
Jeff Hanson	Defensive Line, Recruiting coordinator	2	Richmond (1972)
Anthony Poindexter	Safeties, Special teams coordinator	8	Virginia (1999)
Vincent Brown	Linebackers, Asst. Special Teams Coach	2	Mississippi Valley State (1987)
Mike Faragalli	Running backs	2	Rhode Island (1980)
Shawn Moore	Wide receivers	2	Virginia (1990)
Scott Wachenheim	Offensive Line, Tight Ends	2	Air Force (1984)
Chip West	Cornerbacks	2	Livingstone (1993)
Evan Marcus	Dir. of Football Training & Player Development	2	Ithaca College (1990)
Marques Hagans	Graduate assistant	1	Virginia (2005)
Gordie Sammis	Graduate assistant	2	Virginia (2007)

== Schedule ==
Date	Time	Opponent	Site	TV	Result	Attendance
September 1	3:00 pm	Richmond*	Scott Stadium; Charlottesville, VA	ESPN3	W 43–19	50,081
September 8	12:00 pm	Penn State*	Scott Stadium; Charlottesville, VA	ABC	W 17–16	56,087
September 15	3:30 pm	at Georgia Tech	Bobby Dodd Stadium; Atlanta, GA	ESPNU	L 20–56	44,225
September 22	12:00 pm	at No. 17 TCU*	Amon G. Carter Stadium; Fort Worth, TX	ESPN	L 7–27	46,330
September 29	3:30 pm	Louisiana Tech*	Scott Stadium; Charlottesville, VA	ESPN3	L 38–44	42,027
October 6	3:00 pm	at Duke	Wallace Wade Stadium; Durham, NC	ACCRSN	L 17–42	26,856
October 13	3:00 pm	Maryland	Scott Stadium; Charlottesville, VA (rivalry)	ACCRSN	L 20–27	45,556
October 20	12:30 pm	Wake Forest	Scott Stadium; Charlottesville, VA	ACCN	L 10–16	41,167
November 3	12:30 pm	at NC State	Carter–Finley Stadium; Raleigh, NC	ACCN	W 33–6	54,812
November 10	12:00 pm	Miami (FL)	Scott Stadium; Charlottesville, VA	ABC	W 41–40	45,870
November 15	7:30 pm	North Carolina	Scott Stadium; Charlottesville, VA (The South's Oldest Rivalry)	ESPN	L 13–37	45,760
November 24	12:00 pm	at Virginia Tech	Lane Stadium; Blacksburg, VA (Commonwealth Cup)	ESPNU	L 14–17	65,632
*Non-conference game; Rankings from Coaches' Poll released prior to the game; All times are in Eastern time

== Depth chart ==
Depth Chart release before October 6, 2012 Duke game.

Defense

FS
Anthony Harris
Rijo Walker
⋅

WLB	MLB	SLB
⋅	Steve Greer	⋅
Daquan Romero	Kwontie Moore	⋅
Tucker Windle	Tucker Windle	⋅

SS
Brandon Phelps
Anthony Cooper
⋅

CB
Demetrious Nicholson
C.J. Moore
⋅

DE	DT	DT	DE
Jake Snyder	Will Hill	Brent Urban	Bill Schautz
Ausar Walcott	Chris Brathwaite	Justin Renfrow	Eli Harold
⋅	⋅	David Dean	Mike Moore

CB
Drequan Hoskey
Maurice Canady
⋅

Offense

WR
Darius Jennings
Dominique Terrell
⋅

LT	LG	C	RG	RT
Oday Aboushi	Conner Davis	Luke Bowanko	Sean Cascarano	Morgan Moses
Matt Mihalik	Cody Wallace	Ross Burbank	Sean Karl	Jay Whitmire
⋅	⋅	⋅	⋅	⋅

TE
Paul Freedman
Colter Phillips
Jeremiah Mathis

WR
Tim Smith
E.J. Scott
⋅

QB
Phillip Sims
Michael Rocco
David Watford

RB
Perry Jones
Kevin Parks
Clifton Richardson

FB
Zachary Swanson
Billy Skrobacz
LoVante' Battle

Special teams
PK Drew Jarrett
PK Ian Frye
P Alec Vozenilek
KR Darius Jennings
PR Khalek Shepherd
LS Matt Fortin
H Jacob Hodges
