= 2012 Maryland Terrapins football team =

American college football season

2012 Maryland Terrapins football
- Conference: Atlantic Coast Conference
- Atlantic Division
- Record: 4–8 (2–6 ACC)
- Head coach: Randy Edsall (2nd season)
- Offensive coordinator: Mike Locksley (1st season)
- Offensive scheme: Multiple
- Defensive coordinator: Brian Stewart (1st season)
- Base defense: 3–4
- Captains: C. J. Brown; Kevin Dorsey; Joe Vellano; Demetrius Hartsfield
- Home stadium: Byrd Stadium

2012 Atlantic Coast Conference football standings
	Conf.			Overall
Team	W		L	W		L
Atlantic Division
No. 10 Florida State xy$	7	–	1	12	–	2
No. 11 Clemson x	7	–	1	11	–	2
NC State	4	–	4	7	–	6
Wake Forest	3	–	5	5	–	7
Maryland	2	–	6	4	–	8
Boston College	1	–	7	2	–	10
Coastal Division
Georgia Tech xy	5	–	3	7	–	7
North Carolina†	5	–	3	8	–	4
Miami (FL)‡	5	–	3	7	–	5
Virginia Tech	4	–	4	7	–	6
Duke	3	–	5	6	–	7
Virginia	2	–	6	4	–	8
Championship: Florida State 21, Georgia Tech 15
$ – BCS representative as conference champion; x – Division champion/co-champions; y – Championship game participant; † North Carolina ineligible for ACC title, championship game, and bowl game due to NCAA sanctions. ‡ Miami ineligible for ACC title, championship game, and bowl game due to self-imposed sanctions.; Rankings from AP Poll

The 2012 Maryland Terrapins football team represented the University of Maryland, College Park in the 2012 NCAA Division I FBS football season. The Terrapins were led by second-year head coach Randy Edsall and played their home games at Byrd Stadium. It was the Terrapins' 60th season as a member of the Atlantic Coast Conference (ACC) and their eighth season in the ACC's Atlantic Division.

The 2012 Terrapins team was best known for its troubles at quarterback, with four lost for the season after injuries and resorting to freshman linebacker Shawn Petty, who was a quarterback in high school at nearby Eleanor Roosevelt High School.

== Schedule ==
Date	Time	Opponent	Site	TV	Result	Attendance	Source
September 1	3:00 pm	William & Mary*	Byrd Stadium; College Park, MD	ESPN3	W 7–6	31,321	
September 8	12:00 pm	at Temple*	Lincoln Financial Field; Philadelphia, PA	ESPNU	W 36–27	23,322	
September 15	12:30 pm	Connecticut*	Byrd Stadium; College Park, MD	ACCN	L 21–24	35,491	
September 22	12:00 pm	at No. 8 West Virginia*	Mountaineer Field; Morgantown, WV (rivalry)	FX	L 21–31	58,504	
October 6	3:30 pm	Wake Forest	Byrd Stadium; College Park, MD	ESPNU	W 19–14	40,391	
October 13	3:00 pm	at Virginia	Scott Stadium; Charlottesville, VA (rivalry)	ACCRSN	W 27–20	45,556	
October 20	3:30 pm	NC State^{†}	Byrd Stadium; College Park, MD	ESPNU	L 18–20	40,217	
October 27	1:00 pm	at Boston College	Alumni Stadium; Chestnut Hill, MA	ESPN3	L 17–20	33,267	
November 3	12:30 pm	Georgia Tech	Byrd Stadium; College Park, MD	ACCN	L 13–33	33,471	
November 10	3:30 pm	at No. 10 Clemson	Memorial Stadium; Clemson, SC	ESPNU	L 10–45	76,000	
November 17	12:00 pm	No. 10 Florida State	Byrd Stadium; College Park, MD	ESPNU	L 14–41	35,244	
November 24	3:00 pm	at North Carolina	Kenan Memorial Stadium; Chapel Hill, NC	ACCRSN	L 38–45	44,000	
*Non-conference game; ^{†}Homecoming; Rankings from AP Poll released prior to the game; All times are in Eastern time

== Coaching staff ==
Name	Position(s)	Year at Maryland	Alma mater	Sources
Randy Edsall	Head coach	2nd	Syracuse (1980)	
Mike Locksley	Offensive coordinator / quarterbacks	7th (Note: Mike Locksley was previously an assistant coach at Maryland from 1997–2002. He rejoined the Maryland coaching staff in 2012.)	Towson (1992)	
Brian Stewart	Defensive coordinator / defensive backs	1st	Northern Arizona (1995)	
Tom Brattan	Offensive line	12th	Delaware (1972)	
Greg Gattuso	Assistant head coach / defensive line	2nd	Penn State (1983)	
Keith Dudzinski	Inside Linebackers	2nd	New Haven (1991)	
John Dunn	Tight ends / recruiting coordinator	2nd	North Carolina (2005)	
Lee Hull	Wide receivers	5th	Holy Cross (1988)	
Lyndon Johnson	Outside linebackers	2nd	Connecticut (1992)	
Andre Powell	Special teams coordinator / running backs	2nd	Indiana (1989)	
Drew Wilson	Director of strength and conditioning	2nd	King's College (2000)	
Justin Lima	Assistant strength and conditioning coach	1st	Bridgewater State	
Alan Weber	Assistant strength and conditioning coach	2nd	Iowa	
Wes Robinson	Head trainer	6th	Morehead State (1995)	
Curome Cox	Graduate assistant	3rd	Maryland (2003)	

== Game summaries ==
=== William & Mary ===
	1	2	3	4	Total
Tribe	6	0	0	0	6
Terrapins	0	0	0	7	7

Statistics	W&M	MD
First downs	15	13
Total yards	229	236
Rushing yards	104	91
Passing yards	125	145
Turnovers	2	4
Time of possession	30:48	29:12

Team	Category	Player	Statistics
William & Mary	Passing	Raphael Ortiz	7/16, 100 yards
William & Mary	Rushing	Keith McBride	10 rushes, 55 yards
William & Mary	Receiving	Tre McBride	6 receptions, 97 yards
Maryland	Passing	Perry Hills	16/24, 145 yards, 3 INT
Maryland	Rushing	Justus Pickett	11 rushes, 45 yards, TD
Maryland	Receiving	Marcus Leak	3 receptions, 37 yards

=== At Temple ===
	1	2	3	4	Total
Terrapins	3	23	3	7	36
Owls	3	0	14	10	27

Statistics	MD	TEM
First downs	19	9
Total yards	334	230
Rushing yards	144	52
Passing yards	190	178
Turnovers	4	3
Time of possession	33:33	26:27

Team	Category	Player	Statistics
Maryland	Passing	Perry Hills	11/21, 190 yards, 2 TD
Maryland	Rushing	Justus Pickett	21 rushes, 69 yards, TD
Maryland	Receiving	Marcus Leak	3 receptions, 90 yards, TD
Temple	Passing	Chris Coyer	7/18, 178 yards, 2 TD, INT
Temple	Rushing	Chris Coyer	17 rushes, 53 yards
Temple	Receiving	Jalen Fitzpatrick	2 receptions, 64 yards, TD

=== Connecticut ===
	1	2	3	4	Total
Huskies	7	7	3	7	24
Terrapins	0	7	0	14	21

Statistics	CONN	MD
First downs	10	16
Total yards	223	205
Rushing yards	153	96
Passing yards	70	109
Turnovers	1	2
Time of possession	31:14	28:46

Team	Category	Player	Statistics
Connecticut	Passing	Chandler Whitmer	10/16, 68 yards
Connecticut	Rushing	Lyle McCombs	27 rushes, 94 yards, TD
Connecticut	Receiving	John Delahunt	3 receptions, 43 yards
Maryland	Passing	Perry Hills	10/24, 109 yards, TD, INT
Maryland	Rushing	Wes Brown	14 rushes, 74 yards, TD
Maryland	Receiving	Stefon Diggs	3 receptions, 57 yards, TD

=== At No. 8 West Virginia ===
	1	2	3	4	Total
Terrapins	7	7	0	7	21
No. 8 Mountaineers	14	10	0	7	31

Statistics	MD	WVU
First downs	18	19
Total yards	351	363
Rushing yards	46	25
Passing yards	305	338
Turnovers	3	0
Time of possession	31:14	28:46

Team	Category	Player	Statistics
Maryland	Passing	Perry Hills	20/29, 305 yards, 3 TD, INT
Maryland	Rushing	Brandon Ross	20 rushes, 52 yards
Maryland	Receiving	Stefon Diggs	3 receptions, 113 yards, 2 TD
West Virginia	Passing	Geno Smith	30/43, 338 yards, 3 TD
West Virginia	Rushing	Andrew Buie	14 rushes, 33 yards
West Virginia	Receiving	Tavon Austin	13 receptions, 179 yards, 3 TD

=== Wake Forest ===
	1	2	3	4	Total
Demon Deacons	7	0	7	0	14
Terrapins	6	7	0	6	19

Statistics	WF	MD
First downs	11	12
Total yards	241	244
Rushing yards	71	53
Passing yards	170	191
Turnovers	2	3
Time of possession	24:12	35:48

Team	Category	Player	Statistics
Wake Forest	Passing	Tanner Price	13/38, 170 yards, 2 TD
Wake Forest	Rushing	Josh Harris	18 rushes, 73 yards
Wake Forest	Receiving	Terence Davis	7 receptions, 130 yards, TD
Maryland	Passing	Perry Hills	14/25, 191 yards, TD, INT
Maryland	Rushing	Wes Brown	10 rushes, 23 yards
Maryland	Receiving	Stefon Diggs	5 receptions, 105 yards

=== At Virginia ===
	1	2	3	4	Total
Terrapins	17	0	0	10	27
Cavaliers	0	3	10	7	20

Statistics	MD	UVA
First downs	10	20
Total yards	235	386
Rushing yards	-2	168
Passing yards	237	218
Turnovers	1	2
Time of possession	26:28	33:32

Team	Category	Player	Statistics
Maryland	Passing	Perry Hills	14/26, 237 yards, TD
Maryland	Rushing	Perry Hills	7 rushes, 7 yards, TD
Maryland	Receiving	Stefon Diggs	4 receptions, 89 yards
Virginia	Passing	Phillip Sims	13/28, 139 yards, TD, INT
Virginia	Rushing	Kevin Parks	17 rushes, 129 yards
Virginia	Receiving	E. J. Scott	4 receptions, 61 yards, TD

=== NC State ===
	1	2	3	4	Total
Wolfpack	0	10	7	3	20
Terrapins	3	0	12	3	18

Statistics	NCST	MD
First downs	17	22
Total yards	347	462
Rushing yards	40	206
Passing yards	307	256
Turnovers	0	2
Time of possession	24:46	35:14

Team	Category	Player	Statistics
NC State	Passing	Mike Glennon	23/47, 307 yards, 2 TD
NC State	Rushing	Tony Creecy	17 rushes, 35 yards
NC State	Receiving	Bryan Underwood	6 receptions, 134 yards, TD
Maryland	Passing	Perry Hills	12/20, 159 yards, INT
Maryland	Rushing	Wes Brown	25 rushes, 121 yards, TD
Maryland	Receiving	Marcus Leak	4 receptions, 94 yards

=== At Boston College ===
	1	2	3	4	Total
Terrapins	0	0	10	7	17
Eagles	7	3	3	7	20

Statistics	MD	BC
First downs	16	17
Total yards	347	295
Rushing yards	107	8
Passing yards	240	287
Turnovers	3	2
Time of possession	33:27	26:33

Team	Category	Player	Statistics
Maryland	Passing	Caleb Rowe	23/42, 240 yards, 2 TD, 3 INT
Maryland	Rushing	Wes Brown	23 rushes, 73 yards
Maryland	Receiving	Stefon Diggs	11 receptions, 152 yards, TD
Boston College	Passing	Chase Rettig	21/39, 287 yards, 2 TD
Boston College	Rushing	Andre Williams	16 rushes, 60 yards
Boston College	Receiving	Alex Amidon	9 receptions, 137 yards

=== Georgia Tech ===
	1	2	3	4	Total
Yellow Jackets	6	14	7	6	33
Terrapins	0	0	7	6	13

Statistics	GT	MD
First downs		
Total yards		
Rushing yards		
Passing yards		
Turnovers		
Time of possession		

Team	Category	Player	Statistics
Georgia Tech	Passing		
Georgia Tech	Rushing		
Georgia Tech	Receiving		
Maryland	Passing		
Maryland	Rushing		
Maryland	Receiving		

=== At No. 13 Clemson ===
	1	2	3	4	Total
Terrapins	0	7	3	0	10
No. 13 Tigers	21	14	3	7	45

Statistics	MD	CLEM
First downs		
Total yards		
Rushing yards		
Passing yards		
Turnovers		
Time of possession		

Team	Category	Player	Statistics
Maryland	Passing		
Maryland	Rushing		
Maryland	Receiving		
Clemson	Passing		
Clemson	Rushing		
Clemson	Receiving		

=== No. 10 Florida State ===
	1	2	3	4	Total
No. 10 Seminoles	14	13	7	7	41
Terrapins	0	0	7	7	14

Statistics	FSU	MD
First downs		
Total yards		
Rushing yards		
Passing yards		
Turnovers		
Time of possession		

Team	Category	Player	Statistics
Florida State	Passing		
Florida State	Rushing		
Florida State	Receiving		
Maryland	Passing		
Maryland	Rushing		
Maryland	Receiving		

=== North Carolina ===
	1	2	3	4	Total
Tar Heels	7	21	7	3	38
Terrapins	14	7	24	0	45

Statistics	UNC	MD
First downs		
Total yards		
Rushing yards		
Passing yards		
Turnovers		
Time of possession		

Team	Category	Player	Statistics
North Carolina	Passing		
North Carolina	Rushing		
North Carolina	Receiving		
Maryland	Passing		
Maryland	Rushing		
Maryland	Receiving		
