= Phillip Dorsett =

American football player (born 1993)

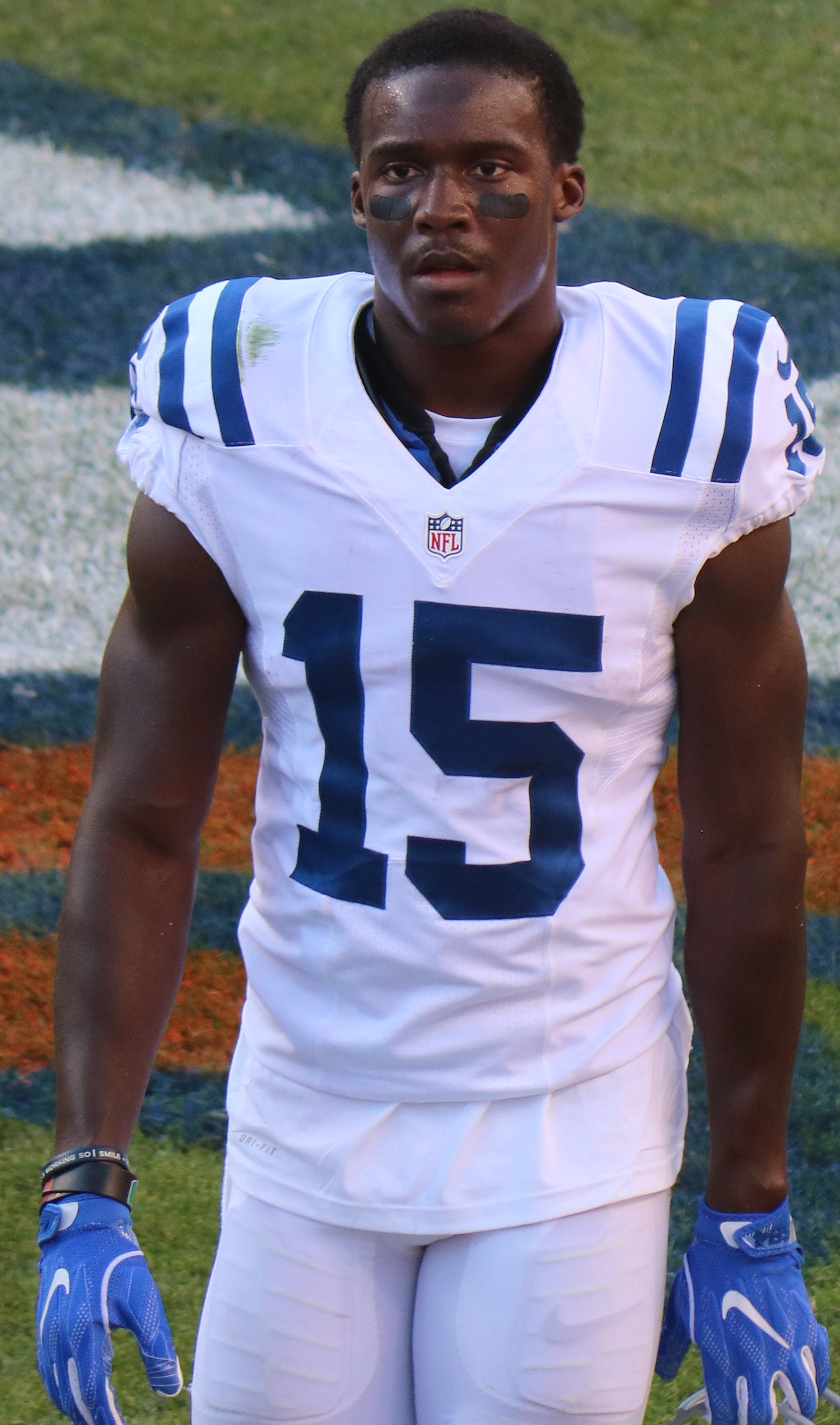
- Dorsett with the Indianapolis Colts in 2016

No. 39 – Arizona Cardinals
- Position: Wide receiver
- Roster status: Practice squad

Personal information
- Born: January 5, 1993 (age 33); Fort Lauderdale, Florida, U.S.
- Listed height: 5 ft 10 in (1.78 m)
- Listed weight: 185 lb (84 kg)

Career information
- High school: St. Thomas Aquinas (Fort Lauderdale)
- College: Miami (FL) (2011–2014)
- NFL draft: 2015: 1st round, 29th overall pick

Career history
- Indianapolis Colts (2015–2016); New England Patriots (2017–2019); Seattle Seahawks (2020); Jacksonville Jaguars (2021); Seattle Seahawks (2021); Houston Texans (2021–2022); Las Vegas Raiders (2023)*; Denver Broncos (2023); Atlanta Falcons (2024)*; Las Vegas Raiders (2025–2026)*; Arizona Cardinals (2026–present)*
- * Offseason or practice squad member only

Awards and highlights
- Super Bowl champion (LIII); Second-team All-ACC (2014)

Career NFL statistics as of 2025
- Receptions: 151
- Receiving yards: 2,001
- Receiving touchdowns: 12
- Stats at Pro Football Reference

Phillip Howard Dorsett II (born January 5, 1993) is an American professional football wide receiver for the Arizona Cardinals of the National Football League (NFL). He played college football for the Miami Hurricanes and was selected by the Indianapolis Colts in the first round, 29th overall pick, of the 2015 NFL draft. Dorsett has also played for the New England Patriots, Jacksonville Jaguars, Seattle Seahawks, Houston Texans, and Denver Broncos.

== Early life ==
Dorsett attended St. Thomas Aquinas High School in Fort Lauderdale, Florida, where he was a two-sport star in football and track. He played as a wide receiver for coach George Smith, and played with future Indianapolis Colts teammate Duron Carter. He hauled in 30 receptions for 594 yards and nine touchdowns as junior. As a senior, he had 35 receptions for 806 yards and 12 touchdowns in an undefeated season, winning Florida 5A football championship as well as finishing first in the Powerade Fab 50 ESPN Rise national poll. He also returned four kicks for touchdowns.

Also a standout track & field athlete, Dorsett was one of the state's top performers in both the sprinting and jumping events. He got personal-best leaps of 7.55 meters (24-7) in the long jump and 14.59 meters (47-9) in the triple jump at the 2011 Louie Bing Classic. He placed second in the 100 meters (10.51 s) and third in the 200 meters (21.26 s) at the 2011 FHSAA District Meet. He recorded a career-best time of 48.32 seconds in the 400 meters at the 2011 BCAA Championships. In addition, he also ran a 4.4-second 40-yard dash and had a 36.5-inch vertical jump at the Under Armour Combine.

Dorsett was rated as a three-star recruit by both Rivals.com. He was ranked as the 45th prospect at his position by ESPNU. He committed to the University of Miami to play college football. Dorsett also considered scholarship offers from Florida, Ohio State, North Carolina, and Georgia, among others.

== College career ==
Dorsett played at Miami from 2011 to 2014. As a true freshman in 2011, he appeared in 12 games. He recorded 14 receptions for 147 yards and a touchdown. As a sophomore in 2012, he played in 12 games with 10 starts and led the team with 58 receptions for 842 yards and four touchdowns. As a junior in 2013, Dorsett played in only seven games due to a knee injury. He finished the year with 13 receptions for 272 yards and two touchdowns. Dorsett started all 13 games his senior season in 2014, recording 36 receptions for 871 yards and 10 touchdowns.

Dorsett also ran track at Miami. He competed in the 60-meter dash and posted a best of 6.80 seconds, the fourth fastest time in that event at Miami.

Dorsett finished his college career with 121 receptions for 2,132 yards and 17 touchdowns.

== Professional career ==
Pre-draft measurables
| Height | Weight | Arm length | Hand span | Wingspan | 40-yard dash | 10-yard split | 20-yard split | 20-yard shuttle | Three-cone drill | Vertical jump | Broad jump | Bench press |
|---|---|---|---|---|---|---|---|---|---|---|---|---|
| 5 ft 9 3/4 in (1.77 m) | 185 lb (84 kg) | 30 1/4 in (0.77 m) | 9 3/8 in (0.24 m) | 6 ft 2 3/4 in (1.90 m) | 4.33 s | 1.54 s | 2.57 s | 4.11 s | 6.70 s | 38 in (0.97 m) | 10 ft 9 in (3.28 m) | 13 reps |
All values, except vertical and broad jump, from NFL Combine

=== Indianapolis Colts ===
==== 2015 season ====
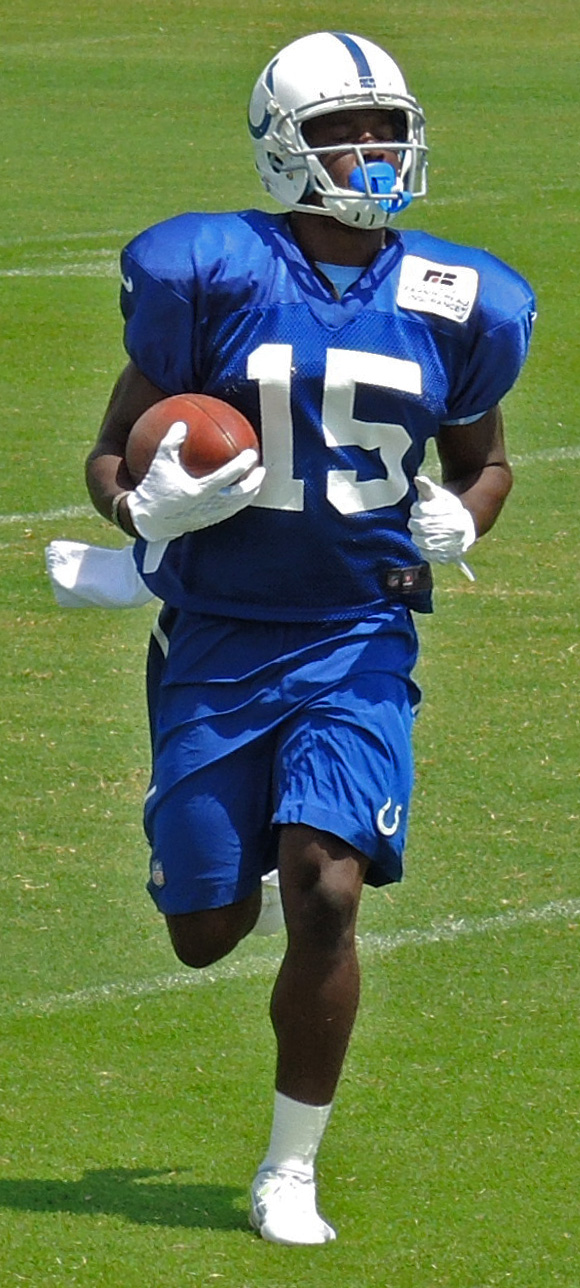
Dorsett at Indianapolis Colts training camp in 2015

Dorsett was selected 29th overall in the first round by the Indianapolis Colts in the 2015 NFL draft. The drafting of Dorsett was a surprise to many analysts and fans, considering Indianapolis already had depth at the wide receiver position, including the recently signed Andre Johnson and Duron Carter, and the selection reportedly upset several Colts players, who thought the team should have instead focused on a defensive player. Dorsett signed a four-year contract with the Colts on May 27, 2015. During Week 3 against the Tennessee Titans, he caught his first NFL touchdown on a 35-yard reception from Andrew Luck. He finished the game with two receptions for 43 yards and a touchdown. Dorsett finished his rookie season with 18 receptions for 225 yards and a touchdown in 11 games and zero starts.

==== 2016 season ====
In the 2016 season-opening loss to the Detroit Lions, Dorsett caught four passes for 94 yards in the 39–35 loss. Three weeks later, he caught a career-long 64-yard touchdown in a 30–27 loss to the Jacksonville Jaguars. During Week 15 against the Minnesota Vikings, he caught his second and final touchdown of the season on a 50-yard pass from Andrew Luck. Overall, Dorsett finished the 2016 season with 33 receptions for 528 yards and two touchdowns in 15 games and seven starts.

=== New England Patriots ===
==== 2017 season ====
On September 2, 2017, Dorsett was traded to the New England Patriots for quarterback Jacoby Brissett. On September 7, Dorsett made his Patriots debut in the 42–27 loss to the Kansas City Chiefs. Dorsett finished his first season with the Patriots with 12 receptions for 194 yards. Despite his limited playing time, he caught a 31-yard pass on a flea-flicker from Tom Brady in the AFC Championship Game against the Jaguars as the Patriots won by a score of 24–20, advancing to Super Bowl LII. In the Super Bowl, Dorsett recorded one catch for 19 yards as the Patriots lost to the Philadelphia Eagles by a score of 41–33.

==== 2018 season ====
On May 2, 2018, the Patriots declined the fifth-year option on Dorsett's contract, making him a free agent in 2019.

In the season opener against the Houston Texans, Dorsett had seven catches for 66 yards and a touchdown. He caught his second touchdown of the season three weeks later in a 38–7 victory against the Miami Dolphins. He finished the game with four catches for 55 yards and a touchdown. Dorsett finished the regular season with 32 catches for 290 yards and three touchdowns. In the divisional playoff game against the Los Angeles Chargers, Dorsett had four receptions for 41 yards and a touchdown. In the AFC Championship Game against the Chiefs, he had only one reception, but it went for a 29-yard touchdown, totaling two touchdowns in the Patriots' first two playoff games. The Patriots reached Super Bowl LIII and defeated the Los Angeles Rams by a score of 13–3, but Dorsett did not record a reception in the game.

==== 2019 season ====
On March 13, 2019, Dorsett re-signed with the Patriots on a one-year contract.

During the season-opener against the Pittsburgh Steelers on NBC Sunday Night Football, Dorsett led the Patriots in receiving yards and touchdowns, catching four passes in four targets for 95 yards with two touchdowns in the 33–3 victory. In Week 11 against the Eagles, Dorsett caught three passes for 33 yards, including a 15-yard touchdown pass from fellow wide receiver Julian Edelman, before suffering a head injury in the 17–10 win. Overall, Dorsett finished the 2019 season with 29 receptions for 397 receiving yards and five receiving touchdowns.

=== Seattle Seahawks (first stint) ===
On March 30, 2020, Dorsett signed a one-year contract with the Seattle Seahawks. After not playing in the team's first two games while nursing a foot injury, Dorsett was placed on injured reserve on September 22, 2020.

=== Jacksonville Jaguars ===
On March 17, 2021, Dorsett signed with the Jacksonville Jaguars. He was released on August 31, 2021, and re-signed to the practice squad the next day. Dorsett was released on September 27, 2021.

=== Seattle Seahawks (second stint) ===
On September 29, 2021, Dorsett was signed to the Seahawks practice squad. He was released on November 30.

=== Houston Texans ===
On December 4, 2021, Dorsett was signed to the Houston Texans practice squad. He was promoted to the active roster on December 11. On December 15, Dorsett signed a contract extension with the Texans that ran through the 2022 season. In the 2021 season, with three different teams, Dorsett had seven receptions for 110 yards in six games. In the 2022 season, Dorsett recorded 20 receptions for 257 receiving yards and one receiving touchdown in 15 games and four starts.

=== Las Vegas Raiders (first stint) ===
On March 16, 2023, Dorsett signed a one-year contract with the Las Vegas Raiders. He was released on August 29.

=== Denver Broncos ===
On August 31, 2023, Dorsett was signed to the Denver Broncos practice squad. He signed a reserve/future contract with Denver on January 8, 2024. On May 10, Dorsett was released by the Broncos only to be re-signed three days later. On August 26, Dorsett was released by the Broncos.

=== Atlanta Falcons ===
On October 22, 2024, Dorsett signed with the Atlanta Falcons practice squad. He signed a reserve/future contract with Atlanta on January 6, 2025. Dorsett was released by the Falcons on May 12.

=== Las Vegas Raiders (second stint) ===
On July 22, 2025, Dorsett signed with the Las Vegas Raiders. He was released on August 25. On September 5, Dorsett was re-signed to the Raiders' practice squad. He signed a reserve/future contract with Las Vegas on January 5, 2026.

On August 30, 2026, Dorsett was released by the Raiders as a part of final roster cuts. On September 29, 2026, he was re-signed to the practice squad. On November 6, he was released.

=== Arizona Cardinals ===
On November 10, 2026, Dorsett signed with the Arizona Cardinals practice squad.

== Career statistics ==
=== NFL ===
Legend
| | Won the Super Bowl |
| **Bold** | Career high |

==== Regular season ====
| Year | Team | Games | | Receiving | | | | | Rushing | | | | | Fumbles | |
| Year | Team | GP | GS | Rec | Yds | Avg | Lng | TD | Att | Yds | Avg | Lng | TD | Fum | Lost |
|---|---|---|---|---|---|---|---|---|---|---|---|---|---|---|---|
| 2015 | IND | 11 | 0 | 18 | 225 | 12.5 | 35T | 1 | 3 | 17 | 5.7 | 11 | 0 | **2** | **1** |
| 2016 | IND | 15 | **7** | **33** | **528** | 16.0 | **64T** | 2 | 2 | 10 | 5.0 | 7 | 0 | 1 | 0 |
| 2017 | NE | 15 | 2 | 12 | 194 | 16.2 | 39 | 0 | 1 | 7 | 7.0 | 7 | 0 | 0 | 0 |
| 2018 | NE | **16** | 2 | 32 | 290 | 9.1 | 20 | 3 | **4** | **29** | **7.3** | **17** | 0 | 0 | 0 |
| 2019 | NE | 14 | 4 | 29 | 397 | 13.7 | 58T | **5** | 3 | 21 | 7.0 | 9 | 0 | 0 | 0 |
| 2020 | SEA | 0 | 0 | Did not play due to injury | | | | | | | | | | | |
| 2021 | JAX | 1 | 0 | 0 | 0 | 0 | 0 | 0 | 0 | 0 | 0 | 0 | 0 | 0 | 0 |
| 2021 | SEA | 2 | 0 | 1 | 3 | 3.0 | 3 | 0 | 0 | 0 | 0 | 0 | 0 | 0 | 0 |
| 2021 | HOU | 3 | 0 | 6 | 107 | **17.8** | 36 | 0 | 1 | 0 | 0.0 | 0 | 0 | 0 | 0 |
| 2022 | HOU | 15 | 4 | 20 | 257 | 12.9 | 34 | 1 | 0 | 0 | 0 | 0 | 0 | 0 | 0 |
| 2023 | DEN | 2 | 1 | 0 | 0 | 0 | 0 | 0 | 0 | 0 | 0 | 0 | 0 | 0 | 0 |
| Total | | 94 | 20 | 151 | 2,001 | 13.3 | 64T | 12 | 14 | 84 | 6.0 | 17 | 0 | 3 | 1 |

==== Postseason ====
| Year | Team | Games | | Receiving | | | | | Rushing | | | | | Fumbles | |
| Year | Team | GP | GS | Rec | Yds | Avg | Lng | TD | Att | Yds | Avg | Lng | TD | Fum | Lost |
|---|---|---|---|---|---|---|---|---|---|---|---|---|---|---|---|
| 2017 | NE | 2 | 0 | 2 | 50 | **25.0** | **31** | 0 | 0 | 0 | 0.0 | 0 | 0 | 0 | 0 |
| 2018 | NE | **3** | 0 | **5** | **70** | 14.0 | 29 | **2** | 0 | 0 | 0.0 | 0 | 0 | 0 | 0 |
| 2019 | NE | 1 | 0 | 1 | 6 | 6.0 | 6 | 0 | 0 | 0 | 0.0 | 0 | 0 | 0 | 0 |
| 2020 | SEA | 0 | 0 | Did not play due to injury | | | | | | | | | | | |
| Total | | 6 | 0 | 8 | 126 | 15.8 | 31 | 2 | 0 | 0 | 0.0 | 0 | 0 | 0 | 0 |

=== College ===
| Season | Team | GP | Receiving | | | |
| Season | Team | GP | Rec | Yds | Avg | TD |
|---|---|---|---|---|---|---|
| 2011 | Miami | 12 | 14 | 147 | 10.5 | 1 |
| 2012 | Miami | 12 | 58 | 842 | 14.5 | 4 |
| 2013 | Miami | 7 | 13 | 272 | 20.9 | 2 |
| 2014 | Miami | 12 | 36 | 871 | 24.2 | 10 |
| Total | | 43 | 121 | 2,132 | 17.6 | 17 |
