= Rashawn Scott (American football) =

American football player (born 1992)

No. 87
- Position: Wide receiver

Personal information
- Born: January 29, 1992 (age 34); Melbourne, Florida, U.S.
- Listed height: 6 ft 1 in (1.85 m)
- Listed weight: 203 lb (92 kg)

Career information
- High school: Melbourne Central Catholic (FL)
- College: Miami (FL) (2011–2015)
- NFL draft: 2016: undrafted

Career history

Playing
- Miami Dolphins (2016–2017)

Coaching
- Georgia (2019–2021) Recruiting analyst / offensive assistant; Texas A&M (2022) Senior athletic assistant

Awards and highlights
- FBS national champion (2021)
- Stats at Pro Football Reference

Carl Rashawn Scott (born January 29, 1992) is an American former professional football wide receiver. He played college football at the University of Miami.

== College career ==
Scott played at Miami (FL) from 2011 to 2015. During his career, he had 91 receptions for 1,241 yards and 8 touchdowns.

== Professional career ==
Pre-draft measurables
Height	Weight	Arm length	Hand span	Vertical jump	Broad jump	Bench press
6 ft 0 7/8 in (1.85 m)	199 lb (90 kg)	31 3/8 in (0.80 m)	9 3/8 in (0.24 m)	32.5 in (0.83 m)	9 ft 8 in (2.95 m)	17 reps
All values from NFL Combine

Scott was signed by the Miami Dolphins as an undrafted free agent after the 2016 NFL draft On September 3, 2016, he was released by the Dolphins as part of final roster cuts and was signed to the practice squad the next day. He was promoted to the active roster on November 30, 2016.

Scott started the 2017 season on the physically unable to perform list after suffering a foot injury in the offseason. He was activated from the PUP list on October 31, 2017. He was waived by the Dolphins on November 29, 2017 and re-signed to the practice squad. He was promoted to the active roster on December 28, 2017.

On September 1, 2018, Scott was waived/injured by the Dolphins and was placed on injured reserve. He was released on September 6, 2018.

== Coaching career ==
Scott was part of the Bulldogs' coaching staff that won the National Championship over Alabama in the 2021 season.
