= Brandon Yosha =

American lawyer (born 1993)

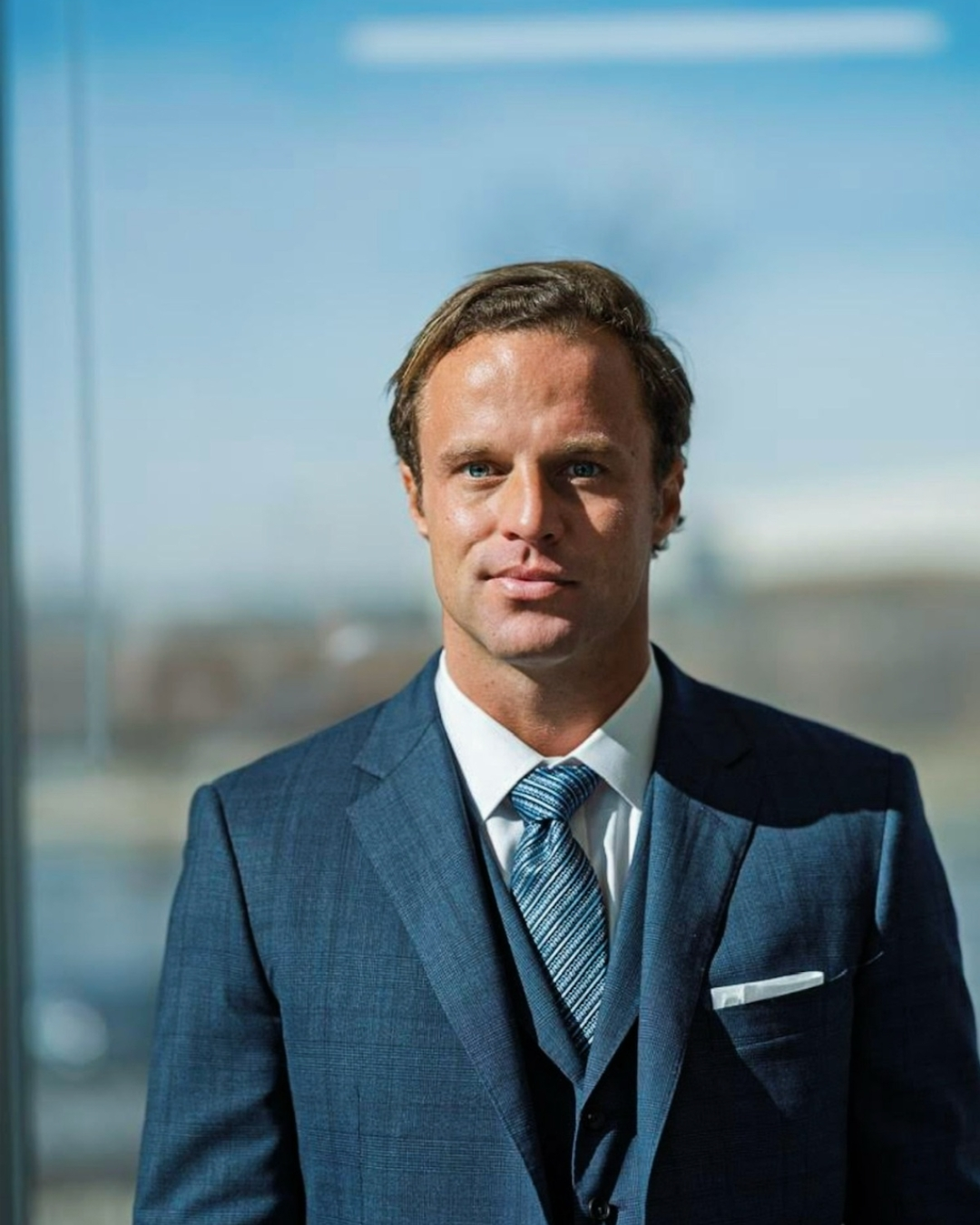
- Born: Brandon Yosha; May 26, 1993 (age 33); Carmel, Indiana
- Education: Indiana University, Bloomington (BA); Indiana University, Indianapolis (JD)
- Occupation: Attorney
- Website: yoshalawfirm.com

Brandon Yosha (born May 26, 1993) is an American trial lawyer known for his role in securing a $20 million damages verdict against Indianapolis Power & Light Co. in 2021, and for his efforts in changing Indiana's move over law (i.e. "Norah's Law") to protect more vehicles when they have pulled off on the sides of highways. Brandon is divorced.

== Early life and education ==
Yosha was born in Carmel, Indiana on May 26, 1993, and is the son of attorney Louis "Buddy" Yosha and his wife, Michele Yosha. Yosha attended college first at the University of Miami, where he played as a running back with the Miami Hurricanes, and he then transferred to Lehigh University where he played a tailback for the Mountain Hawks. After suffering an injury, Yosha moved back to Indiana where he completed his undergraduate education at Indiana University Bloomington, and then attended the Indiana University Robert H. McKinney School of Law where he graduated with a juris doctor degree in 2019.

== Professional career ==
Since graduating from law school, Yosha became a junior partner at Yosha, Cook & Tisch – Personal Injury Lawyer, his father's law firm, in 2020.

He was recognized for the central role he played in securing a $20 million verdict against Indianapolis Power & Light Co. soon after joining the Indiana bar association.

Yosha has also been instrumental in advocating for changes to Indiana's move-over laws (i.e. "Norah's Law"), which aimed to improve roadway safety. As a result, Indiana expanded the existing move-over law in July 2023, extending it to protect all disabled vehicles on the side of the road rather than merely emergency vehicles.
