= 2012 Vanderbilt Commodores football team =

American college football season

2012 Vanderbilt Commodores football

Music City Bowl champion

Music City Bowl, W 38–24 vs. NC State
- Conference: Southeastern Conference
- Eastern Division

Ranking
- Coaches: No. 20
- AP: No. 23
- Record: 9–4 (5–3 SEC)
- Head coach: James Franklin (2nd season)
- Offensive coordinator: John Donovan (2nd season)
- Offensive scheme: Multiple
- Defensive coordinator: Bob Shoop (2nd season)
- Co-defensive coordinator: Brent Pry (2nd season)
- Base defense: 4–3
- Captain: 8: Jordan Rodgers; Walker May; Archibald Barnes; Zac Stacy; Johnell Thomas; Javon Marshall; Wesley Johnson; Carey Spear
- Home stadium: Vanderbilt Stadium

2012 Southeastern Conference football standings
	Conf.			Overall
Team	W		L	W		L
Eastern Division
No. T–5 Georgia xy	7	–	1	12	–	2
No. 9 Florida x%	7	–	1	11	–	2
No. 8 South Carolina	6	–	2	11	–	2
No. 23 Vanderbilt	5	–	3	9	–	4
Missouri	2	–	6	5	–	7
Tennessee	1	–	7	5	–	7
Kentucky	0	–	8	2	–	10
Western Division
No. 1 Alabama x$#	7	–	1	13	–	1
No. 14 LSU *	6	–	2	10	–	3
No. T–5 Texas A&M	6	–	2	11	–	2
Mississippi State	4	–	4	8	–	5
Ole Miss *	3	–	5	7	–	6
Arkansas	2	–	6	4	–	8
Auburn	0	–	8	3	–	9
Championship: Alabama 32, Georgia 28
# – BCS National Champion; $ – BCS representative as conference champion; % – BCS at-large representative; x – Division champion/co-champions; y – Championship game participant; * Ole Miss and LSU vacated all wins due to NCAA violations.; Rankings from AP Poll

The 2012 Vanderbilt Commodores football team represented Vanderbilt University during the 2012 NCAA Division I FBS football season. The Commodores played their six home games at Vanderbilt Stadium at Dudley Field in Nashville, Tennessee, which has been Vanderbilt football's home stadium since 1922. The team's head coach was James Franklin, who was in his second year at Vanderbilt.

On November 11, 2012, Vandy became bowl eligible in back to back years for the first time in its 123-year football history. This was the first time since 1935 that Vandy won five SEC games in a year and the first time in 30 years that they won at home against Tennessee. Vanderbilt finished the year with the longest current SEC winning streak. For the first time since 1948, Vanderbilt finished the season with a top 25 ranking.

== Before the season ==
Vanderbilt vice chancellor of athletics David Williams announced on February 6, 2012, Vanderbilt will be adding new artificial turf and a new JumboTron.

Vice Chancellor Williams confirmed that a large "berm" is to be constructed in the open end of Vanderbilt Stadium as a place for fans to watch games starting fall 2012. The project, in addition to other renovations, began after the Black & Gold scrimmage on April 14, 2012. While several ACC stadiums such as Clemson's Memorial Stadium and Virginia's Scott Stadium have hillside seating, Vanderbilt's idea stemmed from the team's 2011 visit to Wake Forest's BB&T Field, which features "Deacon Hill" in one end zone.

Vanderbilt's is on the line of, but not to the same as Wake Forest. Wake Forest has a natural hill, Vanderbilt's is manmade. Only 500 seats are available, the hillside is a first-come, first-served area in terms of picking a spot to sit. No lounge chairs or coolers are allowed, but fans can bring blankets to place on the grass. The berm will not reach the permanent seating on the sidelines to leave space in the corners of the end zone for fans to enter. The grass on the playing surface will be cut up and relocated to the berm. FieldTurf is being installed as the new playing surface after April 14, 2012. The JumboTron Vanderbilt is installing in the open end zone that will showcase a significantly larger screen than the one above the closed end zone.

The fourth major project set for the stadium is improved lighting. Vanderbilt Stadium has the reputation of being one of D1 college football's darker venues for night games. Renovations are ongoing at McGugin Center, where new meeting rooms and Olympic sport locker rooms are being built. The work is due for completion summer 2012.

On July 12, 2012, Vanderbilt announced that vice chancellor David Williams will change his title to vice chancellor for athletes and university affairs and athletics director. This will be the first time Vanderbilt has had an athletics director since 2003.

== 2012 season milestones ==
In 2012 Franklin's team has had numerous milestones.

- The longest road winning streak (4) since 1950
- Longest win streak (7) since 1948.
- Most times scoring 40 (5) or more points since 1915.
- First Vandy player (Zac Stacy) to rush for over 3,000 yards in career
- First time since 1949–1951 that Vanderbilt beats rival Ole Miss in consecutive years.
- Jordan Matthews set a single-season record with 1,262 yards receiving.
- Kicker Carey Spear school record 81 points.
- Largest margin of victory over rival Tennessee (23) 41–18 since 1954 (26–0)
- Largest margin of victory against secondary rival Kentucky (40) since 1916 when Vanderbilt won 45–0
- First time a Vanderbilt team went to a bowl in back to back years
- First win at home vs Tennessee in 30 years
- First 8 win season since 1982
- Longest rush from scrimmage 90 Zac Stacy.
- First winning record in the regular season since 1982
- Four straight wins in SEC play for the first time since 1949
- The first time in Vanderbilt history a player (Zac Stacy) has rushed for over 1,000 yards back to back years.
- The first 9 win season since 1915

== New uniforms ==
On July 11, 2012, Vanderbilt unveiled new football uniforms. Marking the first time since the 1986 season Vanderbilt added a white helmet. Other changes are to the gold jersey, with the addition of black shoulder covering and numbers. Also Vanderbilt is on the front of all jerseys and Names on the back. A Star V logo is on both sides of the paints (before was only on one side). A gold anchor is in the center of the jersey collar. The words Anchor Down (the team's motto) is placed on the inside of the collar. Vanderbilt has 27 uniform combinations for the 2012 season. For the opener against South Carolina on August 30, 2012, the team wore all black.

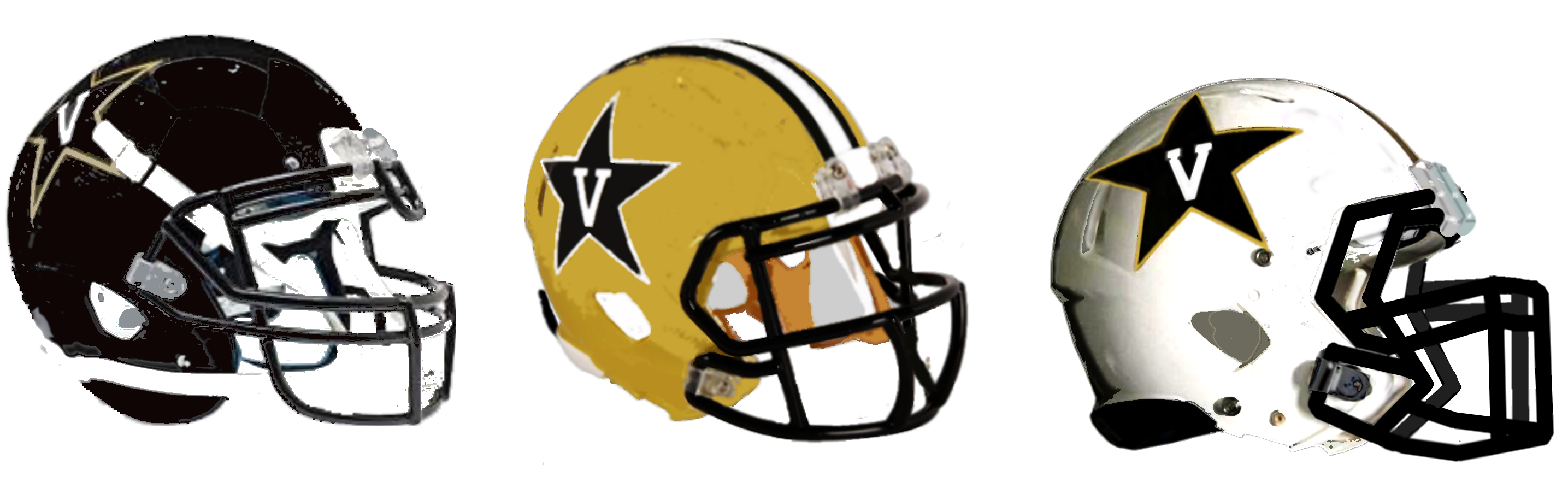
In 2012 Vanderbilt introduced a new all white helmet.

== Maryland transfers ==
On February 18, 2012, Maryland Football coach Randy Edsall blocked three of his players from transferring to Vanderbilt. Quarterback Danny O’Brien, offensive tackle Max Garcia and linebacker Mario Rowson. Franklin was instrumental in O’Brien's recruitment out of North Carolina, and the two shared a close relationship before Franklin's departure to become the head coach at Vanderbilt in December 2010. Edsall's transfer policy does not allow former players to transfer to other ACC schools or upcoming opponents outside the conference.

On February 22, 2012, Edsall changed his mind and said he will allow three football players to transfer to Vanderbilt, if they wish.

On February 22, 2012, Maryland officially filed tampering charges against Vanderbilt: "We have been informed by the Southeastern Conference that the Atlantic Coast Conference has filed a formal complaint involving Vanderbilt University football on behalf of one of its members. We are complying with SEC and Vanderbilt procedures and are conducting an investigation on the matter."

Maryland has believed strongly that O’Brien had been in contact with former Maryland offensive coordinator James Franklin, now Vanderbilt's coach. Under NCAA rules, a school can limit a rival program from having contact with a player without permission: "A rival school can't encourage a player to transfer without permission. And it can't provide athletics aid in the first academic year if the player transfers without that consent."

Franklin has said he keeps relationships with former players but has maintained there was no tampering.

Vanderbilt vice chancellor of athletics David Williams said he will be looking thorough and will be conducting an internal investigation into whether football Coach James Franklin or anyone else on his staff was tampering with Maryland players who intend to transfer. The SEC sent a request to Vanderbilt to have the matter investigated.

== Schedule ==
Date	Time	Opponent	Site	TV	Result	Attendance
August 30	6:00 p.m.	No. 8 South Carolina	Vanderbilt Stadium; Nashville, TN	ESPN	L 13–17	38,393
September 8	7:00 p.m.	at Northwestern*	Ryan Field; Evanston, IL	BTN	L 13–23	31,644
September 15	11:30 a.m.	Presbyterian*	Vanderbilt Stadium; Nashville, TN	CSS	W 58–0	35,491
September 22	6:45 p.m.	at No. 5 Georgia	Sanford Stadium; Athens, GA (rivalry)	ESPN2	L 3–48	92,746
October 6	6:00 p.m.	at Missouri	Faurot Field; Columbia, MO	SECRN	W 19–15	66,250
October 13	5:00 p.m.	No. 4 Florida	Vanderbilt Stadium; Nashville, TN	ESPNU	L 17–31	40,350
October 20	11:21 a.m.	Auburn	Vanderbilt Stadium; Nashville, TN	SECN	W 17–13	40,350
October 27	6:08 p.m.	Massachusetts*^{†}	Vanderbilt Stadium; Nashville, TN	SECRN/NESN	W 49–7	32,227
November 3	11:00 a.m.	at Kentucky	Commonwealth Stadium; Lexington, KY (rivalry)	ESPNU	W 40–0	44,902
November 10	6:00 p.m.	at Ole Miss	Vaught–Hemingway Stadium; Oxford, MS (rivalry)	ESPNU	W 27–26	60,572
November 17	6:00 p.m.	Tennessee	Vanderbilt Stadium; Nashville, TN (rivalry)	ESPN2	W 41–18	40,350
November 24	2:30 p.m.	at Wake Forest*	BB&T Field; Winston-Salem, NC	ESPNU	W 55–21	26,134
December 31	11:00 a.m.	vs. NC State*	LP Field; Nashville, TN (Music City Bowl)	ESPN	W 38–24	55,801
*Non-conference game; ^{†}Homecoming; Rankings from AP Poll released prior to the game; All times are in Central time

== Coaching staff ==
Name	Position	Years at VU
James Franklin	Head coach	2nd
John Donovan	Offensive coordinator / running backs coach	2nd
Bob Shoop	Defensive coordinator / safeties coach	2nd
Charles Bankins	Special teams coordinator / tight ends coach	2nd
Josh Gattis	Wide receivers coach	1st
Herb Hand	Offensive line coach	4th
George Barlow	Defensive backs coach	1st
Ricky Rahne	Quarterbacks coach	2nd
Brent Pry	Co-defensive coordinator / linebackers coach	2nd
Sean Spencer	Defensive line coach	2nd
Andy Frank	Assistant director of football operations	4th
Jemal Griffin	Football Chief of Staff	2nd
Michael Hazel	Director of football operations	4th
Norval McKenzie	Assistant Recruiting coordinator	4th
Joey Orck	Offensive Graduate Assistant	4th
Tom Bossung	Head Athletic Trainer	14th
Kevin Colon	Associate Director of Student Athletics	2nd
Dwight Galt	Football Strength and Conditioning Director	2nd
Chuck Losey	Football Assistant Strength Coach	2nd
Kevin Threlkel	Offensive Administrative Assistant	2nd
Luke Wyatt	Head equipment manager	30th

== Coaching changes ==
On January 13, 2012, Franklin announced the hiring of George Barlow, a defensive coordinator at the University of New Mexico in 2011. At Vanderbilt, he coached defensive backs and served as defensive recruiting coordinator. Josh Gattis, who helped Western Michigan to its fifth bowl game as a receivers coach in 2011, was hired at Vanderbilt as wide receiver coach and handled offensive recruiting coordinator duties.

== Captains ==
Number	Name	Position	Class
67	Wesley Johnson	OT	(RS) SR
31	Javon Marshall	S	(RS) JR
39	Carey Spear	PK	JR
2	Zac Stacy	TB	SR
98	Johnell Thomas	DE	(RS) SR
15	Archibald Barnes	OLB	(RS) SR
11	Jordan Rodgers	QB	(RS) SR
90	Walker May	DE	(RS) JR

=== Starters ===
FIRST TEAM OFFENSE

Position	Name	Name	Name
QB	Jordan Rodgers	Austyn Carta-Samuels	
RB	+ Zac Stacy	Wesley Tate	
WR	Chris Boyd	+ Jordan Matthews	Jonathan Krause
TE	Austin Monahan		
OT	Wesley Johnson	Andrew Bridges	
G	Ryan Seymour	Josh Jelesky	
C	Spencer Pulley		

FIRST TEAM DEFENSE

Position	Name	Name	Name
DE	Johnell Thomas	Walker May	
DT	Rob Lohr		
NT	Colt Nichter		
OLB	Archibald Barnes	Karl Butler	
MLB	Chase Garnham		
CB	Andre Hal	Trey Wilson	
SS	Javon Marshall		
FS	Kenny Ladler		

SPECIAL TEAMS

Position	Name	Name	Name
P	Richard Kent		
K	Ryan Fowler		
H	Richard Kent		
LS	Andrew East		
KO	Carey Spear		
KR	Andre Hal		
PR	Jonathan Krause		

+ All SEC Second Team

=== Recruiting ===
- Austyn Carta-Samuels transferred to Vanderbilt from Wyoming. He contributed as a practice squad quarterback during the 2011 regular season. In 2009, he earned postseason Mountain West Conference Freshman of the Year honors while at Wyoming.

College recruiting (2012)
Name	Hometown	School	Height	Weight	Commit date
Kevin McCoy; OL	Tampa, Florida	Armwood High School	6 ft 5 in (1.96 m)	285 lb (129 kg)	Jan 30, 2012
Kevin McCoy; OL	Recruit ratings: Scout: Rivals: (79)				
Ja'karri Thomas; LB	Tallahassee, Florida	Godby High School	6 ft 1 in (1.85 m)	200 lb (91 kg)	Jan 26, 2012
Ja'karri Thomas; LB	Recruit ratings: Scout: Rivals: (77)				
Ladarius Banks; DT	Dallas, Georgia	East Paulding High School	6 ft 2 in (1.88 m)	275 lb (125 kg)	May 19, 2011
Ladarius Banks; DT	Recruit ratings: Scout: Rivals: (75)				
Adam Butler; OL	Duncanville, Texas	Duncanville High School	6 ft 4 in (1.93 m)	285 lb (129 kg)	Oct 17, 2011
Adam Butler; OL	Recruit ratings: Scout: Rivals: (78)				
Torren McGaster; DB	Daphne, Alabama	Daphne, High	6 ft 0 in (1.83 m)	185 lb (84 kg)	Dec 14, 2011
Torren McGaster; DB	Recruit ratings: Scout: Rivals: (75)				
Stephen Weatherly; LB/DE	Snellville, Georgia	Shiloh High School	6 ft 5 in (1.96 m)	220 lb (100 kg)	May 19, 2011
Stephen Weatherly; LB/DE	Recruit ratings: Scout: Rivals: (79)				
Harding Harper; OL	Montgomery, Alabama	Carver High School	6 ft 2 in (1.88 m)	215 lb (98 kg)	Feb 1, 2012
Harding Harper; OL	Recruit ratings: Scout: Rivals: (76)				
Cory Batey; WR	Nashville, Tennessee	Ensworth School	6 ft 0 in (1.83 m)	188 lb (85 kg)	Jul 1, 2011
Cory Batey; WR	Recruit ratings: Scout: Rivals: (76)				
Jaborian (Tip) McKenzie; ATH	Natchez, Mississippi	Trinity Episcopal School	5 ft 8 in (1.73 m)	175 lb (79 kg)	Aug 2, 2011
Jaborian (Tip) McKenzie; ATH	Recruit ratings: Scout: Rivals: (74)				
Andrew Jelks; ATH	Paris, Tennessee	Henry County High School	6 ft 6 in (1.98 m)	270 lb (120 kg)	Nov 12, 2011
Andrew Jelks; ATH	Recruit ratings: Scout: Rivals: (78)				
Caleb Azubike; DE	Nashville, Tennessee	McGavock High School	6 ft 4 in (1.93 m)	250 lb (110 kg)	Jul 1, 2011
Caleb Azubike; DE	Recruit ratings: Scout: Rivals: (77)				
Paris Head; DB	Lawrenceville, Georgia	Buford High School	6 ft 0 in (1.83 m)	175 lb (79 kg)	Jun 20, 2011
Paris Head; DB	Recruit ratings: Scout: Rivals: (77)				
Brian Kimbrow; RB	Memphis, Tennessee	Memphis East High School	5 ft 8 in (1.73 m)	170 lb (77 kg)	Jul 1, 2011
Brian Kimbrow; RB	Recruit ratings: Scout: Rivals: (80)				
Torey Agee; DL	Opelika, Alabama	Opelika High School	6 ft 3 in (1.91 m)	250 lb (110 kg)	Sep 14, 2011
Torey Agee; DL	Recruit ratings: Scout: Rivals: (77)				
Darreon Herring; LB	Stone Mountain, Georgia	Stephenson High School	6 ft 1 in (1.85 m)	220 lb (100 kg)	May 19, 2011
Darreon Herring; LB	Recruit ratings: Scout: Rivals: (79)				
Barrett Gouger; OL	Soddy-Daisy, Tennessee	Baylor School	6 ft 4 in (1.93 m)	280 lb (130 kg)	May 15, 2011
Barrett Gouger; OL	Recruit ratings: Scout: Rivals: (78)				
Blake Fromang; OL	Orlando, Florida	Lake Highland Preparatory	6 ft 7 in (2.01 m)	285 lb (129 kg)	Sep 3, 2011
Blake Fromang; OL	Recruit ratings: Scout: Rivals: (78)				
Patton Robinette; QB	Maryville, Tennessee	Maryville, HS	6 ft 4 in (1.93 m)	200 lb (91 kg)	Jan 8, 2012
Patton Robinette; QB	Recruit ratings: Scout: Rivals: (79)				
Will Holden; OL	Green Cove Springs, Florida	Clay High School	6 ft 6 in (1.98 m)	280 lb (130 kg)	Oct 31, 2011
Will Holden; OL	Recruit ratings: Scout: Rivals: (78)				
Brandon Banks; DB	Mount Ulla, North Carolina	West Rowan HS	5 ft 10 in (1.78 m)	170 lb (77 kg)	Aug 2, 2011
Brandon Banks; DB	Recruit ratings: Scout: Rivals: (75)				
Jake Sealand; LB	Tucker, Georgia	Tucker, High School	6 ft 2 in (1.88 m)	215 lb (98 kg)	May 15, 2011
Jake Sealand; LB	Recruit ratings: Scout: Rivals: (79)				
Overall recruit ranking: Scout: 45 Rivals: 29 ESPN: 26
Note: In many cases, Scout, Rivals, 247Sports, On3, and ESPN may conflict in their listings of height and weight.; In these cases, the average was taken. ESPN grades are on a 100-point scale.; Sources: "2012 Team Ranking". Rivals.com.

== Rankings ==
Ranking movements Legend: ██ Increase in ranking ██ Decrease in ranking — = Not ranked RV = Received votes
	Week															
Poll	Pre	1	2	3	4	5	6	7	8	9	10	11	12	13	14	Final
AP	—	—	—	—	—	—	—	—	—	—	—	—	RV	RV	RV	23
Coaches	—	RV	—	—	—	—	—	—	—	—	—	—	RV	RV	RV	20
Harris	Not released						—	—	—	—	—	—	RV	RV	RV	Not released
BCS	Not released							—	—	—	—	—	—	—	—	Not released

== Game summaries ==
=== South Carolina ===
Vanderbilt has played South Carolina 22 times and trails 4–18 the first meeting was in 1961 USC won the first seven 1962 to 1997 Vanderbilt won 2 in 98 and 99 USC won the next seven 2000 to 2006 Vandy won the next two and USC has won the last 4. The latest game was the first game of the college football year and played on ESPN.

Team	1	2	3	4	Total
• #9 South Carolina	7	3	0	7	17
Vanderbilt	0	10	3	0	13

- Location: Nashville, Tennessee
- Game start: 6:01 p.m.
- Elapsed time: 3:15
- Game attendance: 38,393
- Game weather: 86°, Partly Cloudy
- Referee: Matt Austin
- TV announcers (ESPN): Rece Davis (play-by-play), David Pollack and Jesse Palmer (color), Samantha Steele (sideline)

=== Northwestern ===
Vanderbilt has played Northwestern 4 times with a 1–2–1 record, the teams' first meeting was in 1947 Vanderbilt won 3–0, in 1962 played to a tie score at 20 and Northwestern has won the last two games 21–23 and 13–23

Team	1	2	3	4	Total
Vanderbilt	7	3	0	3	13
• Northwestern	3	0	3	17	23

- Location: Evanston, Illinois
- Game start: 7:03 p.m.
- Elapsed time: 3:15
- Game attendance: 31,644
- Game weather: 71°, Mostly Cloudy
- Referee: Matt Laeffler
- Television network: Big Ten Network

=== Presbyterian ===
This was the first meeting of Presbyterian and Vanderbilt. Jordan Rodgers did not play in this game.

Team	1	2	3	4	Total
Presbyterian	0	0	0	0	0
• Vanderbilt	10	17	28	3	58

- Location: Nashville, Tennessee
- Game start: 11:30 a.m.
- Elapsed time: 3:03
- Game attendance: 35,491
- Game weather: 72°, Partly Cloudy
- Referee: Jeff Hilyer
- Television network: CSS

=== Georgia ===
Secondary rival Georgia has played Vanderbilt 73 times dating back to 1893. Vanderbilt trails 18–53–2 Vandy was at one time ahead; from 1893 until 1961 Vandy was 14–9–1 from 1962 to present Vanderbilt trails with only 4 wins and 43 losses and 1 tie.

Team	1	2	3	4	Total
Vanderbilt	0	3	0	0	3
• #5 Georgia	13	14	21	0	48

- Location: Athens, Georgia
- Game start: 7:50 p.m.
- Elapsed time: 3:15
- Game attendance: 92,746
- Game weather: 82°, Partly Cloudy
- Referee: Hubert Owens
- TV announcers (ESPN2): Mark Jones (play-by-play), Brock Huard (color), Shelley Smith (sideline)

=== Missouri ===
Missouri and Vanderbilt have played 5 times in a tied series of 2–2–1 the first meeting was 1895. Vanderbilt lost the first 2 games 1895 0–14, 1896 6–26, tied the next 7–7 1957 and won 12–8 in 1958. This was the first meeting since 1958 only one of the five games has been played in Nashville 3 in Columbia, Mo. and 1 in Saint Louis.

Team	1	2	3	4	Total
• Vanderbilt	2	7	0	10	19
Missouri	6	0	3	6	15

- Location: Columbia, Missouri
- Game start: 6:08 p.m.
- Elapsed time: 3:21
- Game attendance: 66,250
- Game weather: 48°, Cloudy
- Referee: Penn Wagers
- Television network: FSN

=== Florida ===
Vanderbilt and secondary rival Florida has played 46 times and trails 9–35–2. Vanderbilt lead for only a few years from 1945 when they first met until 1963 Vandy was 6–6–1 at that point; Vanderbilt has lost the last 22 games the last two have been somewhat close most have been one sided to the Florida side Vanderbilt lost in 1993 by 52 points.

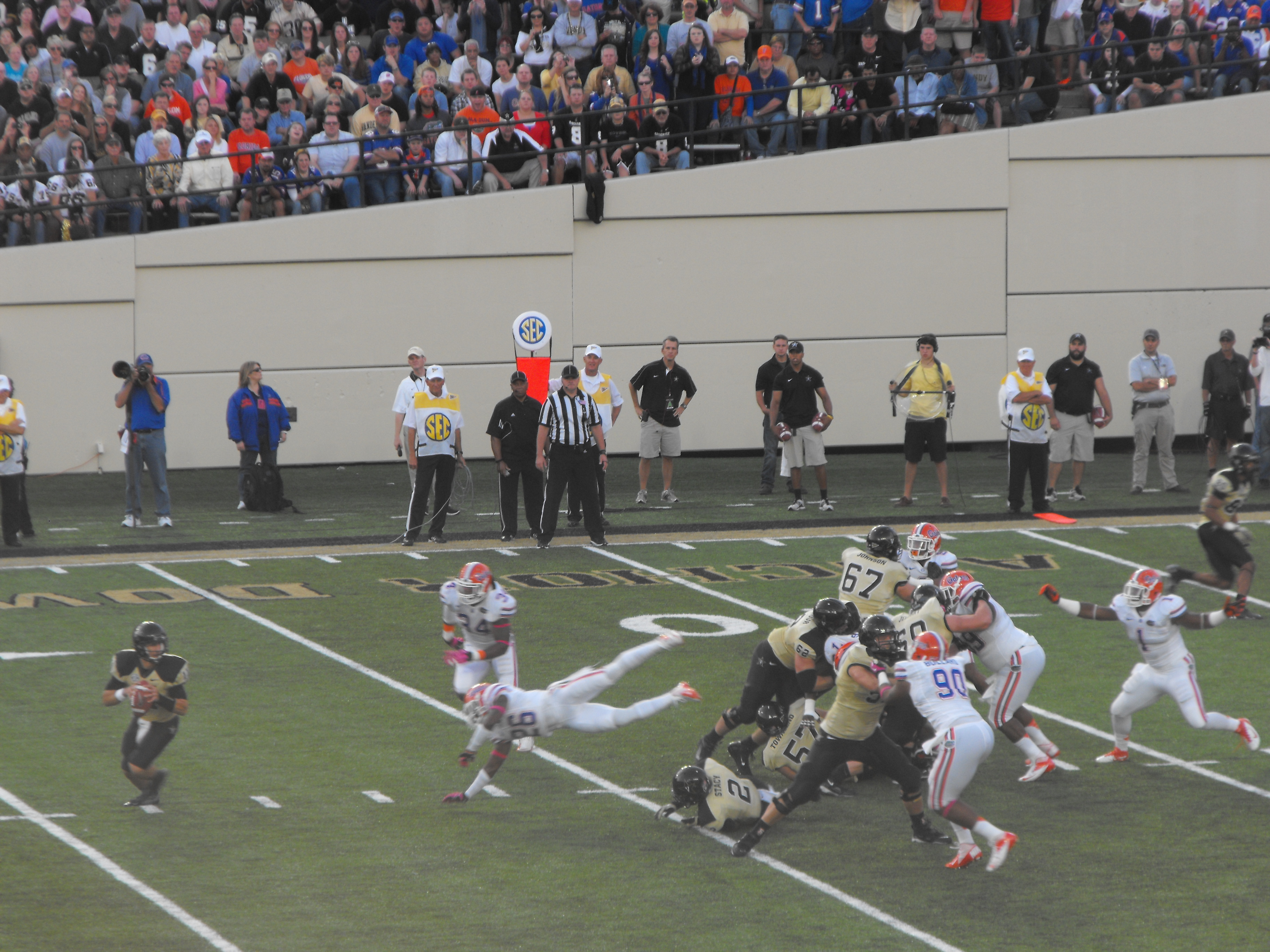
Florida 31 Vanderbilt 17

Team	1	2	3	4	Total
• #4 Florida	0	11	7	13	31
Vanderbilt	7	0	0	10	17

- Location: Nashville, Tennessee
- Game start: 5:00 p.m.
- Elapsed time: 3:28
- Game attendance: 40,350
- Game weather: 76°, Mostly Cloudy
- Referee: Matt Austin
- TV announcers (ESPNU): Clay Matvick (play-by-play), Matt Stinchcomb (color), Jessica Mendoza (sideline)

=== Auburn ===
Auburn and Vandy have met 41 time since 1893 Vandy leads by one game at 21–20–1 Vandy lost the first meeting and won the next 5, games tied 1, lost 2, won 2, lost 1, won 2, lost 1, won1, lost 1, Vandy won the next 8 Auburn won the next in 1955 Vanderbilt played in its first bowl game against Auburn Vandy won 25–13 from 1893 to 1955 Vandy and Auburn played 28 time Vandy lead 19–7–1. The teams did not play from 1956 to 1977 from 1978 to present the teams have played only 15 times Auburn won 13 straight games Vandy has won the last two. The 2008 game was a "ESPN College GameDay" game which Vandy won it made them at the time 5–0.

Team	1	2	3	4	Total
Auburn	0	10	0	3	13
• Vanderbilt	7	3	7	0	17

- Location: Nashville, Tennessee
- Game start: 11:21 a.m.
- Elapsed time: 3:10
- Game attendance: 40,350
- Game weather: 59°, Cloudy
- Referee: Matt Moore
- TV announcers (SEC Network): Dave Neal (play-by-play), Andre Ware (color), Cara Capuano (sideline)

=== University of Massachusetts ===
UMass and Vandy is the first meeting of the schools. This was U Massachusetts first year in FBS.

Team	1	2	3	4	Total
Massachusetts	0	0	0	7	7
• Vanderbilt	7	14	28	0	49

- Location: Nashville, Tennessee
- Game start: 6:08 p.m.
- Elapsed time: 3:13
- Game attendance: 32,227
- Game weather: 52°, Cloudy
- Referee: Mike Conlin
- Television network: FSN

=== Kentucky ===
Vanderbilt and secondary rival Kentucky have played 85 times dating back to 1896. Vanderbilt trails 40–41–4 Vandy won the first nine games from 1896 to 1918; in 1945 Vandy had a record of 19–2–1. The first 11 games Vandy did not give up a point outscoring Kentucky 267 to 0. Vandy has been shutout 7 times and has shutout Kentucky 15 times.

Team	1	2	3	4	Total
• Vanderbilt	7	20	7	6	40
Kentucky	0	0	0	0	0

- Location: Lexington, Kentucky
- Game start: 12:01 p.m.
- Elapsed time: 2:57
- Game attendance: 44,902
- Game weather: 45°, Rain
- Referee: Matt Moore
- TV announcers (ESPNU): Tom Hart (play-by-play), John Congemi (color)

=== Ole Miss ===
Vandy Ole Miss Rivalry is one of the oldest in NCAA first meet in 1894. Vanderbilt trails 38–47–2. Vanderbilt won the first 16 games by shutouts, the first 19 games were won by Vandy. Vanderbilt outscored Ole Miss 566 to 14, with blowout wins in 1894 Vandy by 40, 1902 by 29, 1903, by 33, 1904, by 69, 1906 by 29, 1907, by 60, 1908 by 29, 1911, by 21, 1912, by 24, the biggest margin of defeat Ole Miss suffered was 1915 by 91, 1916 Vandy won by 35. They did not play every year until 1945 the 25 games were played in Tennessee 5 in Memphis and 20 in Nashville. 1948 the first game was played in Oxford, Vandy lost 7–20. From 1955 to 1962 Ole Miss shutout Vandy 7 times from 1945 to 1967 they played 20 years in a row Vandys record was 5–15–2. Since 1970 Vandy and Ole Miss has played every year (43 times), Vandy is 13–30–0. Since 2005 Vandy has won 6 games and the last 3 is the longest for Vandy since 1949 to 1951. The scoring has almost evened out through the years as Vandy has 1556 = 17.9 ppg and Ole Miss with 1610 = 18.5 ppg.

Team	1	2	3	4	Total
• Vanderbilt	3	3	14	7	27
Ole Miss	7	9	7	3	26

- Location: Oxford, Mississippi
- Game start: 6:06 p.m.
- Elapsed time: 3:46
- Game attendance: 60,572
- Game weather: 72°, Fair
- Referee: Marc Curles
- TV announcers (ESPNU): Clay Matvick (play-by-play), Matt Stinchomb (color), Jessica Mendoza (sideline)

=== Tennessee ===
Vanderbilt and rival Tennessee have played 107 games first meeting was 1892 playing most every year from 1900 only missing only a few years, however since 1945 they have played every year (68 times). Vandy trails 29–73–5. In 1927 Vandy was 19–2–3 since the Vols has taken over with a record of 59–8–2. Vanderbilt has been shut out 22 times and shut out UT 15 games. The most points for Vandy is (76) 1913 76–0 and UT's most points is (65) 1994 Vandy lost 0–65 the year before Vandy lost 14–62. The game on November 17, 2012, was the first time that Vanderbilt beat UT at home in 30 years. The Vanderbilt win was the largest margin of victory in the series since 1954 when Vandy won 26–0.

Team	1	2	3	4	Total
Tennessee	0	10	0	8	18
• Vanderbilt	3	10	21	7	41

- Date: November 17
- Location: Nashville, Tennessee
- Game start: 6:05 p.m.
- Elapsed time: 3:38
- Game attendance: 40,350
- Game weather: 55°, Clear
- Referee: Matt Loeffler
- TV announcers (ESPN2): Mark Jones (play-by-play), Brock Huard (color), Shelley Smith (sideline)

Scoring summary
1	12:17	VAN	Carey Spear 19 yard field goal	Vanderbilt 3–0
2	10:47	TEN	Zach Rogers 14 yard pass from Tyler Bray (Michael Parlady kick)	Tennessee 7–3
2	6:56	VAN	Carey Spear 27 yard field goal	Tennessee 7–6
2	3:12	VAN	Chris Boyd 11 yard pass from Jordan Rodgers (Carey Spear kick)	Vanderbilt 13–7
2	:14	TEN	Michael Parlady 28 yard field goal	Vanderbilt 13–10
3	12:17	VAN	Jordan Matthews 47 yard run (Ryan Fowler kick)	Vanderbilt 20–10
3	10:10	VAN	Kris Kentera 3 yard pass from Jordan Rodgers (Ryan Fowler kick)	Vanderbilt 27–10
3	1:53	VAN	Zac Stacy 10 yard run (Ryan Fowler kick)	Vanderbilt 34–10
4	9:52	VAN	Jordan Matthews 71 yard pass from Jordan Rodgers (Ryan Fowler kick)	Vanderbilt 41–10
4	6:15	TEN	Cordarrelle Patterson 81 yard punt return (Marlin Lane run)	Vanderbilt 41–18

=== Wake Forest ===
Wake Forest and Vanderbilt have played 14 times. Vandy leads 8–6, and the first meeting was in 1964.

Team	1	2	3	4	Total
• Vanderbilt	7	21	13	14	55
Wake Forest	7	0	7	7	21

- Location: Winston-Salem, North Carolina
- Game start: 3:32 p.m.
- Elapsed time: 3:08
- Game attendance: 26,134
- Game weather: 47°, Clear
- Referee: David Smith
- Television network: ESPNU

=== NC State ===
Music City Bowl

Team	1	2	3	4	Total
NC State	0	14	0	10	24
• Vanderbilt	7	21	3	7	38

- Location: Nashville, Tennessee
- Game start: 11:01 a.m.
- Elapsed time: 3:20
- Game attendance: 55,801
- Game weather: 41°, Cloudy
- Referee: Ron Snodgrass
- Television network: ESPN
