= 2012 Tennessee Volunteers football team =

American college football season

2012 Tennessee Volunteers football
- Conference: Southeastern Conference
- Eastern Division
- Record: 5–7 (1–7 SEC)
- Head coach: Derek Dooley (3rd season; first 11 games); Jim Chaney (interim; final game)
- Offensive coordinator: Jim Chaney (4th season)
- Offensive scheme: Pro-style
- Defensive coordinator: Sal Sunseri (1st season)
- Base defense: Multiple
- Home stadium: Neyland Stadium

2012 Southeastern Conference football standings
	Conf.			Overall
Team	W		L	W		L
Eastern Division
No. T–5 Georgia xy	7	–	1	12	–	2
No. 9 Florida x%	7	–	1	11	–	2
No. 8 South Carolina	6	–	2	11	–	2
No. 23 Vanderbilt	5	–	3	9	–	4
Missouri	2	–	6	5	–	7
Tennessee	1	–	7	5	–	7
Kentucky	0	–	8	2	–	10
Western Division
No. 1 Alabama x$#	7	–	1	13	–	1
No. 14 LSU *	6	–	2	10	–	3
No. T–5 Texas A&M	6	–	2	11	–	2
Mississippi State	4	–	4	8	–	5
Ole Miss *	3	–	5	7	–	6
Arkansas	2	–	6	4	–	8
Auburn	0	–	8	3	–	9
Championship: Alabama 32, Georgia 28
# – BCS National Champion; $ – BCS representative as conference champion; % – BCS at-large representative; x – Division champion/co-champions; y – Championship game participant; * Ole Miss and LSU vacated all wins due to NCAA violations.; Rankings from AP Poll

The 2012 Tennessee Volunteers football team represented the University of Tennessee in the 2012 NCAA Division I FBS football season. The Volunteers played their home games at Neyland Stadium in Knoxville, Tennessee and competed in the Eastern Division of the Southeastern Conference (SEC). The team was coached by Derek Dooley, who was in his third season with Tennessee. On November 18, 2012, Dooley was fired after 11 games following a 41–18 loss to in-state rival Vanderbilt. Dooley ended his three-year tenure at Tennessee with losing records of 15–21 overall and 4–19 in the SEC. Offensive coordinator Jim Chaney was named interim head coach for the final game of the season against Kentucky. The season was Tennessee's third consecutive losing season, a streak the program had not matched since 1909 to 1911. The 2012 season marked consecutive seasons where the Volunteers only won one conference game for the first time in school history.

== Schedule ==
Date	Time	Opponent	Rank	Site	TV	Result	Attendance
August 31	7:30 pm	vs. NC State*		Georgia Dome; Atlanta, GA (Chick-fil-A Kickoff Game)	ESPNU	W 35–21	55,529
September 8	4:00 pm	Georgia State*		Neyland Stadium; Knoxville, TN	PPV	W 51–13	87,821
September 15	6:00 pm	No. 18 Florida	No. 23	Neyland Stadium; Knoxville, TN (rivalry, College GameDay)	ESPN	L 20–37	102,455
September 22	7:30 pm	Akron*		Neyland Stadium; Knoxville, TN	CSS	W 47–26	81,719
September 29	3:30 pm	at No. 5 Georgia		Sanford Stadium; Athens, GA (rivalry)	CBS	L 44–51	92,746
October 13	9:00 pm	at No. 19 Mississippi State		Davis Wade Stadium; Starkville, MS	ESPN2	L 31–41	57,831
October 20	7:00 pm	No. 1 Alabama		Neyland Stadium; Knoxville, TN (Third Saturday in October)	ESPN	L 13–44	102,455
October 27	12:00 pm	at No. 17 South Carolina		Williams–Brice Stadium; Columbia, SC (rivalry)	ESPN	L 35–38	80,250
November 3	12:00 pm	Troy*^{†}		Neyland Stadium; Knoxville, TN	SECRN	W 55–48	84,189
November 10	12:21 pm	Missouri		Neyland Stadium; Knoxville, TN	SECN	L 48–51 ^{4OT}	89,272
November 17	7:00 pm	at Vanderbilt		Vanderbilt Stadium; Nashville, TN (rivalry)	ESPN2	L 18–41	40,350
November 24	12:21 pm	Kentucky		Neyland Stadium; Knoxville, TN (rivalry)	SECN	W 37–17	81,841
*Non-conference game; ^{†}Homecoming; Rankings from AP Poll released prior to the game; All times are in Eastern time

== Rankings ==
Ranking movements Legend: ██ Increase in ranking ██ Decrease in ranking — = Not ranked RV = Received votes
	Week															
Poll	Pre	1	2	3	4	5	6	7	8	9	10	11	12	13	14	Final
AP	—	RV	23	RV	RV	RV	—	—	—	—	—	—	—	—	—	—
Coaches	—	RV	23	RV	RV	RV	—	—	—	—	—	—	—	—	—	—
Harris	Not released						—	—	—	—	—	—	—	—	—	Not released
BCS	Not released							—	—	—	—	—	—	—	—	Not released

== Coaching staff ==
Name	Position	Seasons at Tennessee	Alma Mater
Derek Dooley	Head coach	3	Virginia (1991)
Jim Chaney	Interim head coach / Offensive Coordinator, Quarterbacks	4	Central Missouri State (1983)
Darin Hinshaw	Wide Receivers/ Passing game coordinator/ Recruiting Coordinator	3	UCF (1993)
Jay Graham	Running Backs	1	Tennessee (1996)
Sam Pittman	Offensive Line	1	Pittsburg State (Kan.) (1985)
Sal Sunseri	Defensive Coordinator, Line Backers	1	Pittsburgh (1981)
John Palermo	Defensive Line	1	Florida State (1973)
Charlie Coiner	Special Teams, Tight Ends	1	Appalachian State (1986)
Derrick Ansley	Cornerbacks	1	Troy (2005)
Josh Conklin	Safeties	1	Northwestern State (2003)

== Game summaries ==
=== NC State ===
Team	1	2	3	4	Total
NC State	7	7	0	7	21
• Tennessee	22	0	10	3	35

- Location: Atlanta, Georgia
- Game start: 7:36 pm
- Elapsed time: 3:29
- Game attendance: 55,529
- Referee: Matt Moore
- TV announcers (ESPNU): Dave Neal (Play-by-Play), Andre Ware (Color), Cara Capuano (Sideline)

The Tennessee Volunteers opened the season in the Georgia Dome against NC State in the annual Chick-fil-A Kickoff Game. Junior college transfer WR Cordarrelle Patterson put a show early on in his debut as a Volunteer, catching a 41-yard touchdown as well as rushing for a 67-yard touchdown on a reverse, both during the first quarter. Tyler Bray threw for 333 passing yards with two touchdowns, including a 72-yard pass to Zach Rogers, who beat NC State star cornerback David Amerson down the field. The defense not only recorded a safety but also forced four interceptions by NC State quarterback Mike Glennon. Despite Bray losing a fumble at the end of the first half, Tennessee would continue to dominate the rest of the game. On the opening possession of the 2nd half, Rajion Neal rushed for an 8-yard touchdown, which would be followed by a 20-yard field goal by Michael Palardy to extend the Vols lead to 32–14. NC State responded in the fourth quarter when Glennon threw a touchdown to Bryan Underwood to whittle Tennessee's lead down to 32–21. Glennon threw two of his four interceptions during the fourth quarter, and after one more Palardy field goal, Tennessee would go on to win 35–21.

== Team players drafted into the NFL ==
Player	Position	Round	Pick	NFL club
Cordarrelle Patterson	Wide receiver	1	29	Minnesota Vikings
Justin Hunter	Wide receiver	2	34	Tennessee Titans
Dallas Thomas	Offensive guard	3	77	Miami Dolphins
Mychal Rivera	Tight end	6	184	Oakland Raiders
