= 2012 Music City Bowl =

2012 Franklin American Mortgage Music City Bowl
- 15th Music City Bowl
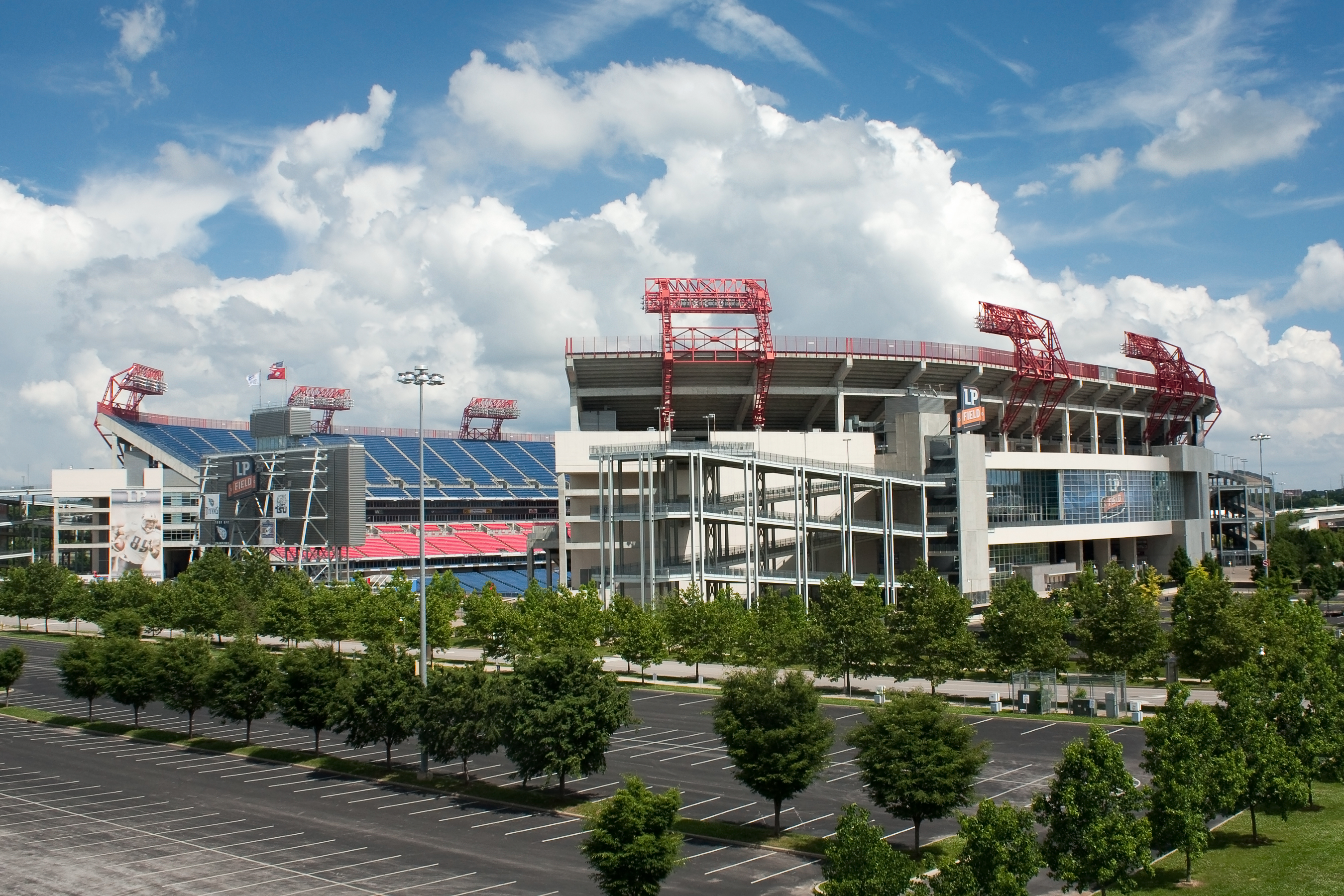
- LP Field in Nashville, Tennessee, hosted the Music City Bowl.
NC State Wolfpack	Vanderbilt Commodores
(7–5)	(8–4)
ACC	SEC
24	38
Head coach: Dana Bible (interim)	Head coach: James Franklin
	1	2	3	4	Total
NC State	0	14	0	10	24
Vanderbilt	7	21	3	7	38
- Date: December 31, 2012
- Season: 2012
- Stadium: LP Field
- Location: Nashville, Tennessee
- MVP: Zac Stacy (RB- Vanderbilt)
- Favorite: Vanderbilt by 6
- Referee: Ron Snodgrass (MAC)
- Attendance: 55,801

United States TV coverage
- Network: ESPN
- Announcers: Carter Blackburn (Play-by-Play); Rod Gilmore (Analyst); Jemele Hill (Sidelines)

The 2012 Franklin American Mortgage Music City Bowl was a post-season American college football bowl game held on December 31, 2012, at LP Field in Nashville, Tennessee. The fifteenth edition of the Music City Bowl began at 11:05 a.m. CST and aired on ESPN. It featured the NC State Wolfpack from the Atlantic Coast Conference (ACC) against the Vanderbilt Commodores from the Southeastern Conference (SEC) and was the final game of the 2012 NCAA Division I FBS football season for both teams. The Wolfpack accepted their invitation to the game after attaining a 7–5 regular-season record, while the hometown Commodores accepted theirs after attaining an 8–4 record.

== Teams ==
=== NC State ===
The Wolfpack finished in third place in the Atlantic Division with a 4–4 record, resulting in the firing of head coach Tom O'Brien after the season; assistant coach Dana Bible coached the Wolfpack in the bowl game.

This was the Wolfpack's first Music City Bowl.

=== Vanderbilt ===
The Commodores' season, on the other hand, was one of their more successful in recent history; finishing in fourth place in the SEC's Eastern Division with a 5–3 record, the Commodores accepted the bid to their hometown Music City Bowl.

This was the Commodores' second Music City Bowl; previously, they had played in the 2008 game, defeating the Boston College Eagles by a score of 16–14. It was also the first time the Commodores have ever been to a bowl game in consecutive seasons; the previous season saw them reach the 2011 Liberty Bowl, losing to the Cincinnati Bearcats by a score of 31–24.

== Game summary ==
=== Scoring summary ===
Scoring summary

Quarter	Time	Drive			Team	Scoring information	Score	
Quarter	Time	Plays	Yards	TOP	Team	Scoring information	N.C. State	Vanderbilt
1	9:55	10	60	5:04	Vandy	Chris Boyd 5-yard touchdown reception from Jordan Rodgers, Carey Spear kick good	0	7
2	10:08	4	27	1:46	Vandy	Zac Stacy 6-yard touchdown run, Ryan Fowler kick good	0	14
2	6:18	11	84	3:50	NCSU	Tony Creecy 1-yard touchdown run, Niklas Sade kick good	7	14
2	3:47	5	47	2:31	Vandy	Wesley Tate 7-yard touchdown run, Carey Spear kick good	7	21
2	3:35	-	-	-	NCSU	Tobais Palmer 94-yard kickoff return for a touchdown, Niklas Sade kick good	14	21
2	0:41	2	18	0:13	Vandy	Jordan Matthews 18-yard touchdown reception from Jordan Rodgers, Ryan Fowler kick good	14	28
3	9:39	8	23	3:01	Vandy	30-yard field goal by Carey Spear	14	31
4	14:56	12	66	3:42	NCSU	24-yard field goal by Niklas Sade	17	31
4	5:11	8	44	4:18	Vandy	Jordan Rodgers 15-yard touchdown run, Carey Spear kick good	17	38
4	2:06	10	71	3:05	NCSU	Rashard Smith 19-yard touchdown reception from Mike Glennon, Niklas Sade kick good	24	38
"TOP" = time of possession. For other American football terms, see Glossary of American football.							24	38
