= 2012 Arkansas Razorbacks football team =

American college football season

2012 Arkansas Razorbacks football
- Conference: Southeastern Conference
- Western Division
- Record: 4–8 (2–6 SEC)
- Head coach: John L. Smith (1st season)
- Offensive coordinator: Paul Petrino (3rd season)
- Offensive scheme: Multiple
- Defensive coordinator: Paul Haynes (1st season)
- Base defense: 4–3
- Captains: Alfred Davis; Knile Davis; Alonzo Highsmith Jr.; Travis Swanson; Tyler Wilson; Tenarius Wright
- Home stadium: Donald W. Reynolds Razorback Stadium; War Memorial Stadium

2012 Southeastern Conference football standings
	Conf.			Overall
Team	W		L	W		L
Eastern Division
No. T–5 Georgia xy	7	–	1	12	–	2
No. 9 Florida x%	7	–	1	11	–	2
No. 8 South Carolina	6	–	2	11	–	2
No. 23 Vanderbilt	5	–	3	9	–	4
Missouri	2	–	6	5	–	7
Tennessee	1	–	7	5	–	7
Kentucky	0	–	8	2	–	10
Western Division
No. 1 Alabama x$#	7	–	1	13	–	1
No. 14 LSU *	6	–	2	10	–	3
No. T–5 Texas A&M	6	–	2	11	–	2
Mississippi State	4	–	4	8	–	5
Ole Miss *	3	–	5	7	–	6
Arkansas	2	–	6	4	–	8
Auburn	0	–	8	3	–	9
Championship: Alabama 32, Georgia 28
# – BCS National Champion; $ – BCS representative as conference champion; % – BCS at-large representative; x – Division champion/co-champions; y – Championship game participant; * Ole Miss and LSU vacated all wins due to NCAA violations.; Rankings from AP Poll

The 2012 Arkansas Razorbacks football team represented the University of Arkansas as a member of the Southeastern Conference (SEC) during the 2012 NCAA Division I FBS football season. Led by John L. Smith in his first and only season as head coach, the Razorbacks compiled an overall record of 4–8 with a mark of 2–6 in conference play, placing sixth in the SEC's Western Division. The team played five home games at Donald W. Reynolds Razorback Stadium in Fayetteville, Arkansas and two home games at War Memorial Stadium in Little Rock, Arkansas.

The Razorbacks entered the season coming off of a win in the 2012 Cotton Bowl Classic, finishing the season with an 11–2 record and a No. 5 ranking in the AP poll. However, head coach Bobby Petrino was fired in the offseason after it was discovered that he covered up an extramarital affair with a member of his staff. Athletic director Jeff Long hired former special teams coordinator John L. Smith, who had recently left to become the head football coach at Weber State University, to replace Petrino on a ten-month contract. Despite these circumstances, the Razorbacks were ranked No. 10 in the preseason AP poll.

The Razorbacks started the season with a win over Jacksonville State, coached by former Arkansas head coach Jack Crowe, and rose to No. 8 in the AP poll. However, after an upset loss to unranked Louisiana–Monroe in overtime, they dropped out of the poll. The Razorbacks never reentered the rankings, as the loss began a four-game losing streak. After the season, Smith's contract was not renewed. Instead, Arkansas chose to hire Wisconsin head coach Bret Bielema.

== Schedule ==
Date	Time	Opponent	Rank	Site	TV	Result	Attendance
September 1	6:00 pm	No. 22 (FCS) Jacksonville State*	No. 10	Donald W. Reynolds Razorback Stadium; Fayetteville, AR	ARSN PPV	W 49–24	71,062
September 8	6:00 pm	Louisiana–Monroe*	No. 8	War Memorial Stadium; Little Rock, AR	ESPNU	L 31–34 ^{OT}	53,089
September 15	2:30 pm	No. 1 Alabama		Donald W. Reynolds Razorback Stadium; Fayetteville, AR	CBS	L 0–52	74,617
September 22	6:00 pm	Rutgers*		Donald W. Reynolds Razorback Stadium; Fayetteville, AR	ESPNU	L 26–35	72,543
September 29	11:00 am	at Texas A&M		Kyle Field; College Station, TX (rivalry)	SECN	L 10–58	86,442
October 6	11:00 am	at Auburn		Jordan–Hare Stadium; Auburn, AL	ESPN2	W 24–7	85,813
October 13	6:00 pm	Kentucky		Donald W. Reynolds Razorback Stadium; Fayetteville, AR	SECRN	W 49–7	67,153
October 27	11:21 am	Ole Miss		War Memorial Stadium; Little Rock, AR (rivalry)	SECN	L 27–30	55,378
November 3	11:21 am	Tulsa*^{†}		Donald W. Reynolds Razorback Stadium; Fayetteville, AR	SECN	W 19–15	64,451
November 10	11:00 am	at No. 12 South Carolina		Williams–Brice Stadium; Columbia, SC	CBS	L 20–38	78,772
November 17	11:21 am	at Mississippi State		Davis Wade Stadium; Starkville, MS	SECN	L 14–45	54,838
November 23	1:30 pm	No. 8 LSU		Donald W. Reynolds Razorback Stadium; Fayetteville, AR (rivalry)	CBS	L 13–20	71,117
*Non-conference game; ^{†}Homecoming; Rankings from AP Poll released prior to the game; All times are in Central time

== Rankings ==
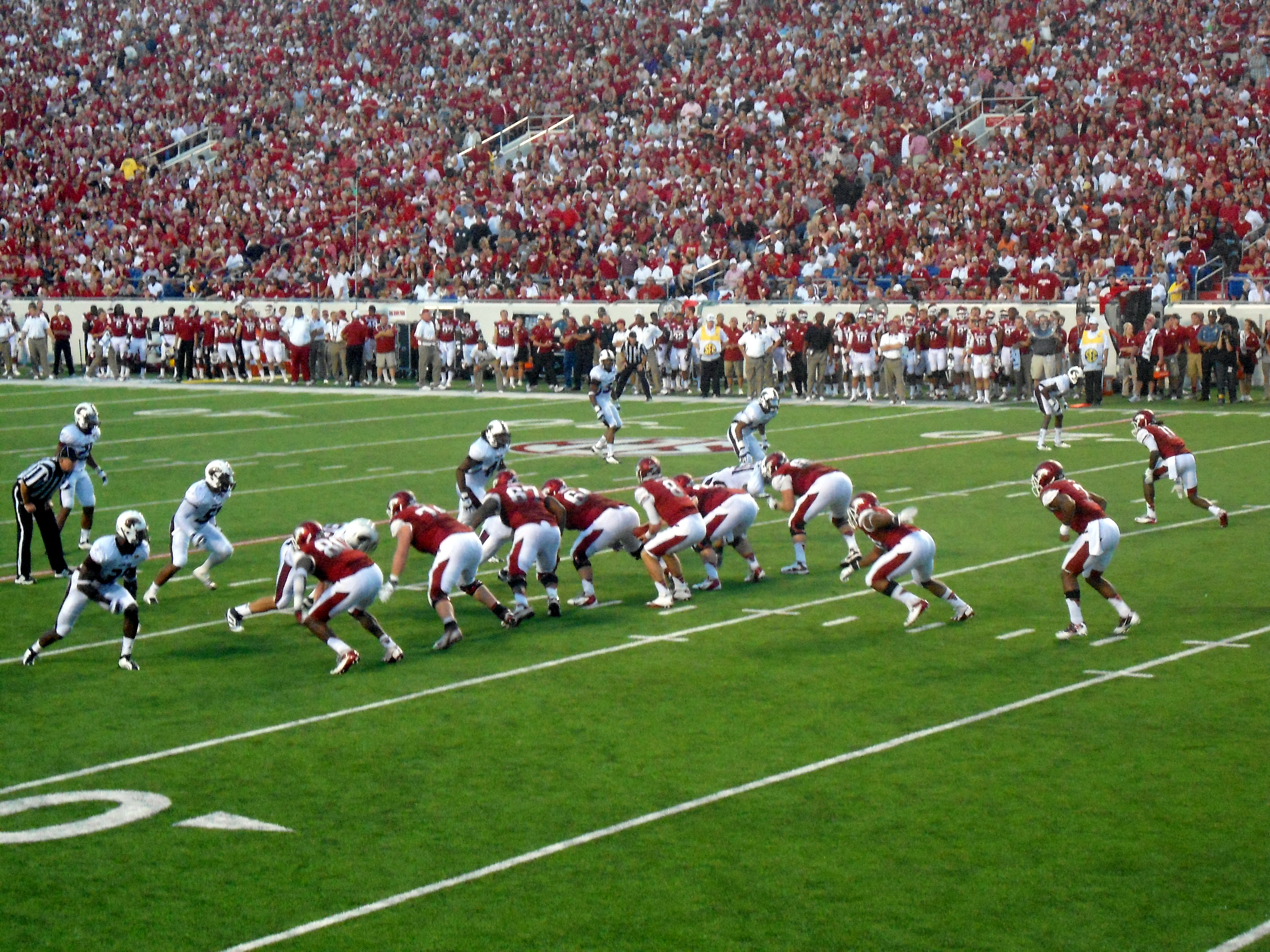
The 2012 Razorbacks football team snaps the ball in War Memorial Stadium

Ranking movements Legend: ██ Increase in ranking ██ Decrease in ranking — = Not ranked RV = Received votes
	Week															
Poll	Pre	1	2	3	4	5	6	7	8	9	10	11	12	13	14	Final
AP	10	8	RV	—	—	—	—	—	—	—	—	—	—	—	—	—
Coaches	10	10	21	—	—	—	—	—	—	—	—	—	—	—	—	—
Harris	Not released						—	—	—	—	—	—	—	—	—	Not released
BCS	Not released							—	—	—	—	—	—	—	—	Not released

== Game summaries ==
=== No. 22 (FCS) Jacksonville State ===
	1	2	3	4	Total
No. 22 (FCS) Gamecocks	7	14	3	0	24
No. 10 Razorbacks	7	28	14	0	49

=== Louisiana–Monroe ===
	1	2	3	4	OT	Total
Warhawks	7	0	7	14	6	34
No. 8 Razorbacks	7	14	7	0	3	31

=== No. 1 Alabama ===
	1	2	3	4	Total
No. 1 Crimson Tide	7	17	14	14	52
Razorbacks	0	0	0	0	0

=== Rutgers ===
	1	2	3	4	Total
Scarlet Knights	0	14	14	7	35
Razorbacks	10	0	3	13	26

=== At Texas A&M ===
	1	2	3	4	Total
Razorbacks	10	0	0	0	10
Aggies	7	20	17	14	58

=== At Auburn ===
	1	2	3	4	Total
Razorbacks	7	3	0	14	24
Tigers	0	0	7	0	7

=== Kentucky ===
	1	2	3	4	Total
Wildcats	0	0	7	0	7
Razorbacks	28	14	7	0	49

=== Ole Miss ===
	1	2	3	4	Total
Rebels	0	21	3	6	30
Razorbacks	10	7	0	10	27

=== Tulsa ===
	1	2	3	4	Total
Golden Hurricane	0	12	3	0	15
Razorbacks	10	3	0	6	19

=== At No. 12 South Carolina ===
	1	2	3	4	Total
Razorbacks	0	10	3	7	20
No. 12 Gamecocks	7	14	17	0	38

=== At Mississippi State ===
	1	2	3	4	Total
Razorbacks	7	7	0	0	14
Bulldogs	7	10	14	14	45

=== No. 8 LSU ===
	1	2	3	4	Total
No. 8 Tigers	3	7	7	3	20
Razorbacks	0	0	10	3	13

== Personnel ==
=== Coaching staff ===
Name	Position	Seasons at Arkansas	Alma mater
John L. Smith	Head coach	1	Weber State Wildcats (1970)
Paul Haynes	Defensive coordinator, Secondary	1	Kent State (1992)
Paul Petrino	Offensive coordinator, Quarterbacks	1	Carroll College (1988)
Tim Horton	Running Backs, Recruiting Coordinator	5	Arkansas (1990)
Kris Cinkovich	Wide receivers	3	Carroll College (1984)
Kevin Peoples	Defensive line	1	Carroll College (1989)
Steve Caldwell	Special Teams, Defensive ends	3	Arkansas State (1977)
Taver Johnson	Linebackers	1	Wittenberg (1994)

=== Recruits ===
College recruiting
Name	Hometown	School	Height	Weight	40^{‡}	Commit date
Vin Ascolese; LB	North Bergen, NJ	North Bergen HS	6 ft 2 in (1.88 m)	215 lb (98 kg)	4.6	Jan 27, 2012
Vin Ascolese; LB	Recruit ratings: Scout: Rivals: (74)					
Cordale Boyd; OL	Memphis, TN	Ridgeway HS	6 ft 4 in (1.93 m)	290 lb (130 kg)	N/A	Apr 20, 2011
Cordale Boyd; OL	Recruit ratings: Scout: Rivals: (79)					
Ray Buchanan Jr. DB	Suwanee, GA	Peachtree Ridge HS	5 ft 11 in (1.80 m)	178 lb (81 kg)	4.5	Aug 20, 2011
Ray Buchanan Jr. DB	Recruit ratings: Scout: Rivals: (77)					
Jared Collins; DB	Tulsa, OK	Booker T. Washington HS	6 ft 0 in (1.83 m)	170 lb (77 kg)	4.4	Aug 1, 2011
Jared Collins; DB	Recruit ratings: Scout: Rivals: (73)					
D'Arthur Cowan; WR	Olive Branch, MS	Olive Branch HS	6 ft 3 in (1.91 m)	175 lb (79 kg)	4.6	Jul 27, 2011
D'Arthur Cowan; WR	Recruit ratings: Scout: Rivals: (80)					
Austin Flynn; DE	Wilmington, CA	Los Angeles Harbor C.C.	6 ft 4 in (1.93 m)	260 lb (120 kg)	4.5	Dec 21, 2011
Austin Flynn; DE	Recruit ratings: Scout: Rivals: (JC)					
Keon Hatcher; WR	Owasso, OK	Owasso HS	6 ft 2 in (1.88 m)	205 lb (93 kg)	4.5	Aug 1, 2011
Keon Hatcher; WR	Recruit ratings: Scout: Rivals: (80)					
Eric Hawkins; WR	Longview, TX	Longview HS	5 ft 11 in (1.80 m)	172 lb (78 kg)	4.5	Jul 16, 2011
Eric Hawkins; WR	Recruit ratings: Scout: Rivals: (NR)					
Will Hines; DB	Waco, TX	Waco HS	6 ft 1 in (1.85 m)	175 lb (79 kg)	4.5	Jan 19, 2012
Will Hines; DB	Recruit ratings: Scout: Rivals: (75)					
Nathan Holmes; ATH	Port Arthur, TX	Port Arthur Memorial HS	6 ft 1 in (1.85 m)	185 lb (84 kg)	4.49	Apr 6, 2011
Nathan Holmes; ATH	Recruit ratings: Scout: Rivals: (78)					
Taiwan Johnson; DE	Manvel, TX	Manvel HS	6 ft 3 in (1.91 m)	240 lb (110 kg)	4.8	Dec 21, 2011
Taiwan Johnson; DE	Recruit ratings: Scout: Rivals: (79)					
Brandon Lewis; DE	Memphis, TN	Ridgeway HS	6 ft 5 in (1.96 m)	225 lb (102 kg)	4.7	Jul 16, 2011
Brandon Lewis; DE	Recruit ratings: Scout: Rivals: (79)					
Defonta Lowe; DB	Bearden, AR	Bearden HS	6 ft 3 in (1.91 m)	185 lb (84 kg)	4.5	Sep 7, 2011
Defonta Lowe; DB	Recruit ratings: Scout: Rivals: (77)					
Mekale McKay; WR	Louisville, KY	Moore HS	6 ft 6 in (1.98 m)	192 lb (87 kg)	4.45	Mar 8, 2012
Mekale McKay; WR	Recruit ratings: Scout: Rivals: (79)					
Otha Peters; LB	Covington, LA	Covington HS	6 ft 1 in (1.85 m)	221 lb (100 kg)	4.6	Jan 31, 2012
Otha Peters; LB	Recruit ratings: Scout: Rivals: (79)					
Darius Philon; DE	Prichard, AL	Vigor	6 ft 1 in (1.85 m)	282 lb (128 kg)	4.78	Feb 1, 2012
Darius Philon; DE	Recruit ratings: Scout: Rivals: (79)					
Trevor Williams; WR	Norman, OK	Norman HS	6 ft 2 in (1.88 m)	188 lb (85 kg)	0.1	Apr 27, 2011
Trevor Williams; WR	Recruit ratings: Scout: Rivals: (79)					
Jeremy Sprinkle; DE	White Hall, AR	White Hall HS	6 ft 6 in (1.98 m)	210 lb (95 kg)	4.6	Jun 16, 2011
Jeremy Sprinkle; DE	Recruit ratings: Scout: Rivals: (77)					
A. J. Turner; LB	Lepanto, AR	East Poinsett County HS	6 ft 3 in (1.91 m)	205 lb (93 kg)	4.5	Apr 16, 2011
A. J. Turner; LB	Recruit ratings: Scout: Rivals: (NR)					
Jeremy Ward; OL	Pottsville, AR	Pottsville HS	6 ft 4 in (1.93 m)	290 lb (130 kg)	5.3	Feb 4, 2011
Jeremy Ward; OL	Recruit ratings: Scout: Rivals: (79)					
Jonathan Williams; RB	Allen, TX	Allen HS	5 ft 11 in (1.80 m)	205 lb (93 kg)	4.51	Nov 11, 2011
Jonathan Williams; RB	Recruit ratings: Scout: Rivals: (79)					
Demetrius Wilson; WR	Glendale, AZ	Glendale CC	6 ft 1 in (1.85 m)	175 lb (79 kg)	4.4	Jan 29, 2012
Demetrius Wilson; WR	Recruit ratings: Scout: Rivals: (JC)					
JaMichael Winston; DE	Prichard, AL	Vigor HS	6 ft 5 in (1.96 m)	226 lb (103 kg)	N/A	Oct 11, 2011
JaMichael Winston; DE	Recruit ratings: Scout: Rivals: (78)					
Deatrich Wise; DE	Carrollton, TX	Hebron HS	6 ft 5 in (1.96 m)	235 lb (107 kg)	4.7	Aug 6, 2011
Deatrich Wise; DE	Recruit ratings: Scout: Rivals: (75)					
Overall recruit ranking: Scout: 19 Rivals: 34
‡ Refers to 40-yard dash; Note: In many cases, Scout, Rivals, 247Sports, On3, and ESPN may conflict in their listings of height, weight and 40 time.; In these cases, the average was taken. ESPN grades are on a 100-point scale.; Sources: "Arkansas 2012 Football Commitments". Rivals.; "2012 Player Commitments - Arkansas". ESPN.; "2012 Team Ranking". Rivals.com.
