= 2012 NCAA Division I FBS football season =

American college football season

2012 NCAA Division I FBS season
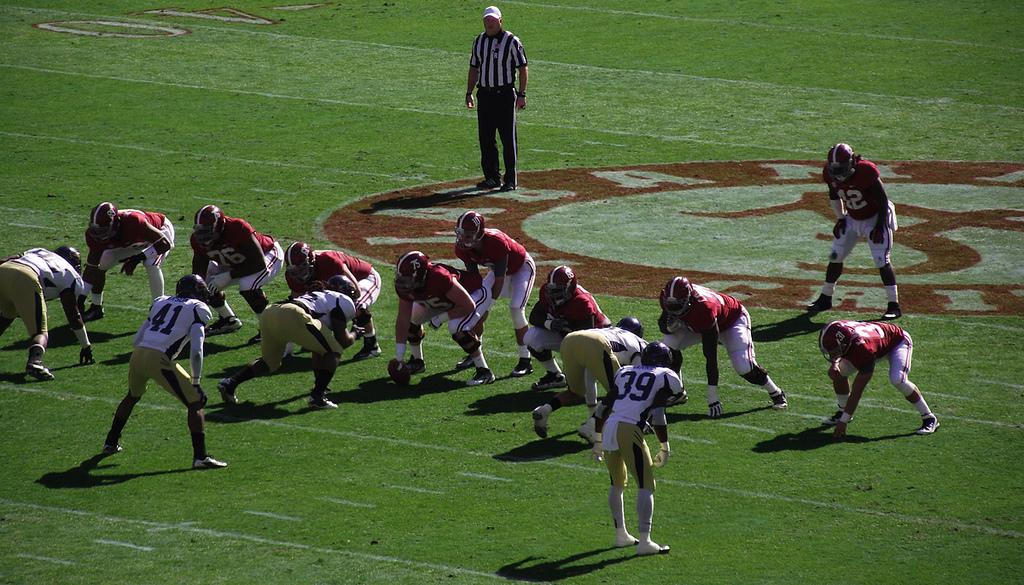
- Western Carolina at Alabama.
- Number of teams: 120 + 4 transitional
- Duration: August 30 – December 8
- Preseason AP No. 1: USC

Postseason
- Duration: December 15, 2012 – January 7, 2013
- Bowl games: 35
- Heisman Trophy: Johnny Manziel (quarterback, Texas A&M)

Bowl Championship Series
- 2013 BCS Championship Game
- Site: Sun Life Stadium; Miami Gardens, Florida
- Champion(s): Alabama

NCAA Division I FBS football seasons
- ← 2011 2013 →

The 2012 NCAA Division I FBS football season was the highest level of college football competition in the United States organized by the National Collegiate Athletic Association (NCAA).

The regular season began on August 30, 2012, and ended on December 8, 2012. The postseason concluded on January 7, 2013, with the BCS National Championship Game, where Alabama repeated as national champions by defeating Notre Dame.

Although Ohio State finished the regular season as the only undefeated team from an automatic-qualifying ("Power 5") BCS conference, they were ineligible to play in the postseason due to sanctions imposed earlier in the year.

== Rule changes ==
The NCAA Rules Committee approved the following rule changes for the 2012 season, mostly for safety reasons:

- Kickoffs will be moved up to the 35-yard line from the 30, mirroring a similar change by the NFL in the 2011 season and rescinding a rule change made in the 2007 season.
- The kicking team will only have a five-yard running head start on kickoffs, again mirroring the NFL changes in 2011.
- Touchbacks will move from the 20-yard line to the 25-yard line only on kickoffs and free kicks after a safety. Touchbacks on punts rolling into the end zone, fumbles into the end zone, and interceptions in the end zone will remain at the 20-yard line.
- Players will be forbidden to leap over other players when blocking punts.
- Players who lose their helmets during a play (except when caused by fouls such as grabbing the facemask) will have to leave the field for one play. When a helmet is lost during play by the ball carrier, the play is dead immediately. Any action made by or against a helmetless player is penalized as a personal foul for 15 yards.
- Offensive players in the tackle box at the snap who are not in motion are allowed to block below the waist legally without restriction. All other players are restricted from blocking below the waist with some exceptions (i.e., blocking straight-on), modifying a rule change from the 2011 season.

== Conference realignment ==
=== Membership changes ===
The following list includes schools transitioning from FCS to FBS.

School	Former conference	New conference
Fresno State	WAC	Mountain West
Hawaii	WAC	Mountain West
Massachusetts	CAA (FCS)	MAC
Missouri	Big 12	SEC
Nevada	WAC	Mountain West
South Alabama	FCS Independent	Sun Belt
TCU	Mountain West	Big 12
Temple	MAC	Big East
Texas A&M	Big 12	SEC
Texas State	Southland (FCS)	WAC
UTSA	FCS Independent	WAC
West Virginia	Big East	Big 12

On March 7, Temple was admitted back into the Big East Conference after having been expelled from it a decade earlier for failing to maintain a competitive football program. Temple joined from the Mid-American Conference, where it had competed since 2007.

=== Teams transitioning to FBS ===
On April 9, 2012, Georgia State University, a member of the Colonial Athletic Association, announced that it would rejoin the Sun Belt Conference effective in July 2013. Georgia State had been a charter Sun Belt member when the conference formed in 1976, but left in 1981. The Panthers began their FBS transition during the 2012 season and started playing a full Sun Belt schedule upon joining the conference in 2013. Full FBS membership, along with bowl eligibility, followed in 2014. The Panthers, who had been coached by Bill Curry since starting a football program in 2010, played home games at the Georgia Dome near the school's campus in downtown Atlanta. The Panthers remained at the Georgia Dome until its closure and demolition after the 2016 season; they have since taken over the venue formerly known as Centennial Olympic Stadium and Turner Field and converted it into the football-specific venue originally known as Georgia State Stadium and now as Center Parc Stadium.

Georgia State followed four other schools that were in the second and final years of FBS transitions— UMass, South Alabama, Texas State, and UTSA.

=== Future changes ===
The conference realignment period that began in 2010 continued for a third consecutive off-season.

The Mountain West Conference continued to raid the rapidly-collapsing Western Athletic Conference by adding San Jose State and Utah State on May 4. The additions allowed the Mountain West, which was anticipating the looming departures of Boise State and San Diego State to the Big East, to keep its football membership at ten teams for the 2013 season.

On September 12, the Atlantic Coast Conference (ACC) announced the addition of Notre Dame in all sports except football. Under the agreement, Notre Dame's football team would play five games against ACC opponents per season but remain classified an FBS independent, while its other sports would be fully integrated into the ACC. The arrangement is effectively a stronger version of the affiliation Notre Dame had had with the Big East since 1995.

The Big Ten Conference, having already added Nebraska in 2011, admitted two more schools to expand the conference's geographic footprint to the East Coast. Maryland, coming from the ACC, was announced as the 13th member on November 19, followed by Rutgers of the Big East as the 14th member on November 21. Both moves would take effect during the 2014–15 academic year.

To keep its football membership at an even number, the ACC added Louisville on November 28 as a replacement for departing Maryland.

== Updated stadiums ==
=== Expanded stadiums ===
- Boise State moved their track and field program out of Bronco Stadium, allowing for the expansion of end zone bleachers over the existing track. The new permanent additions increased capacity from 33,500 to 37,000.
- Nebraska continued its expansion of Memorial Stadium that would push its capacity beyond 90,000.
- TCU completed a major renovation of Amon G. Carter Stadium. Seating capacity increased only by about 600 seats to 45,000.
- Texas State nearly doubled the size of Bobcat Stadium as part of its FBS transition. The venue, which formerly contained about 16,000 seats, now holds 30,000.

=== Renovated stadiums ===
- California returned to California Memorial Stadium following major renovations, which included a full seismic retrofit, as the stadium is located directly on a major fault. The stadium's capacity was reduced from 71,800 to 62,700. The Golden Bears played their 2011 home schedule at AT&T Park in San Francisco, and also played what was officially a neutral-site game against Fresno State at Candlestick Park, also in San Francisco.
- Clemson renovated the video systems at Clemson Memorial Stadium prior to the start of the 2012 season. A new Jumbotron was installed on the primary scoreboard behind the East endzone, while two smaller video boards were installed on each side of the WestZone stands. In addition, video ribbons were installed along the facings of the upper decks.
- Michigan State completed a complete overhaul of their sound and video system with the addition of two video boards in the north end zone, a video ribbon along the entire north edge and installation of the fourth largest scoreboard in the NCAA in the south end zone.

=== Temporary stadiums ===
- Due to major renovations at Husky Stadium, Washington played its entire 2012 home schedule at nearby CenturyLink Field, home to the Seattle Seahawks (NFL) and Seattle Sounders FC (MLS).
- Due to renovations at Warren McGuirk Alumni Stadium, Massachusetts played its entire 2012 home schedule at Gillette Stadium, home to the New England Patriots (NFL) and New England Revolution (MLS). The school is also contractually obligated to play all of its 2013 home schedule, plus at least four home games in each season from 2014 to 2016, at Gillette, which is approximately a 2-hour drive from the UMass campus.

== Regular season top 10 matchups ==
Rankings reflect the AP Poll. Rankings for Week 8 and beyond will list BCS Rankings first and AP Poll second. Teams that failed to be a top 10 team for one poll or the other will be noted.

- Week 1
  - No. 2 Alabama defeated No. 8 Michigan, 41–14 (Cowboys Stadium, Arlington, Texas)
- Week 4
  - No. 4 Florida State defeated No. 10 Clemson, 49–37 (Doak Campbell Stadium, Tallahassee, Florida)
- Week 6
  - No. 6 South Carolina defeated No. 5 Georgia, 35–7 (Williams–Brice Stadium, Columbia, South Carolina)
  - No. 10 Florida defeated No. 4 LSU, 14–6 (Ben Hill Griffin Stadium, Gainesville, Florida)
- Week 7
  - No. 9 LSU defeated No. 3 South Carolina, 23–21 (Tiger Stadium, Baton Rouge, Louisiana)
- Week 8
  - No. 2/3 Florida defeated No. 7/9 South Carolina, 44–11 (Ben Hill Griffin Stadium, Gainesville, Florida)
- Week 9
  - No. 5/5 Notre Dame defeated No. 8/8 Oklahoma, 30–13 (Oklahoma Memorial Stadium, Norman, Oklahoma)
  - No. 10/12 Georgia defeated No. 2/3 Florida, 17–9 (EverBank Field, Jacksonville, Florida)
- Week 10
  - No. 1/1 Alabama defeated No. 5/5 LSU, 21–17 (Tiger Stadium, Baton Rouge, Louisiana)
- Week 13
  - No. 4/6 Florida defeated No. 10/10 Florida State, 37–26 (Doak Campbell Stadium, Tallahassee, Florida)
- Week 14
  - No. 2/2 Alabama defeated No. 3/3 Georgia, 32–28 (2012 SEC Championship Game, Georgia Dome, Atlanta, Georgia)

== Conference standings ==
2012 Atlantic Coast Conference football standings
	Conf.			Overall
Team	W		L	W		L
Atlantic Division
No. 10 Florida State xy$	7	–	1	12	–	2
No. 11 Clemson x	7	–	1	11	–	2
NC State	4	–	4	7	–	6
Wake Forest	3	–	5	5	–	7
Maryland	2	–	6	4	–	8
Boston College	1	–	7	2	–	10
Coastal Division
Georgia Tech xy	5	–	3	7	–	7
North Carolina†	5	–	3	8	–	4
Miami (FL)‡	5	–	3	7	–	5
Virginia Tech	4	–	4	7	–	6
Duke	3	–	5	6	–	7
Virginia	2	–	6	4	–	8
Championship: Florida State 21, Georgia Tech 15
$ – BCS representative as conference champion; x – Division champion/co-champions; y – Championship game participant; † North Carolina ineligible for ACC title, championship game, and bowl game due to NCAA sanctions. ‡ Miami ineligible for ACC title, championship game, and bowl game due to self-imposed sanctions.; Rankings from AP Poll

2012 Big East Conference football standings
	Conf.			Overall
Team	W		L	W		L
No. 13 Louisville $+	5	–	2	11	–	2
Cincinnati +	5	–	2	10	–	3
Rutgers +	5	–	2	9	–	4
Syracuse +	5	–	2	8	–	5
Pittsburgh	3	–	4	6	–	7
Connecticut	2	–	5	5	–	7
Temple	2	–	5	4	–	7
South Florida	1	–	6	3	–	9
$ – BCS representative as conference champion; + – Conference co-champions; Rankings from AP Poll

2012 Big Ten Conference football standings
	Conf.			Overall
Team	W		L	W		L
Legends Division
No. 25 Nebraska xy	7	–	1	10	–	4
No. 24 Michigan	6	–	2	8	–	5
No. 17 Northwestern	5	–	3	10	–	3
Michigan State	3	–	5	7	–	6
Iowa	2	–	6	4	–	8
Minnesota	2	–	6	6	–	7
Leaders Division
No. 3 Ohio State* x	8	–	0	12	–	0
Penn State*	6	–	2	8	–	4
Wisconsin y$	4	–	4	8	–	6
Purdue	3	–	5	6	–	7
Indiana	2	–	6	4	–	8
Illinois	0	–	8	2	–	10
Championship: Wisconsin 70, Nebraska 31
$ – BCS representative as conference champion; x – Division champion/co-champions; * Ohio State and Penn State ineligible for conference championship game and post-season bowl games due to NCAA sanctions.; Rankings from AP Poll

2012 Big 12 Conference football standings
	Conf.			Overall
Team	W		L	W		L
No. 12 Kansas State $+	8	–	1	11	–	2
No. 15 Oklahoma +	8	–	1	10	–	3
No. 19 Texas	5	–	4	9	–	4
Oklahoma State	5	–	4	8	–	5
Baylor	4	–	5	8	–	5
TCU	4	–	5	7	–	6
Texas Tech	4	–	5	8	–	5
West Virginia	4	–	5	7	–	6
Iowa State	3	–	6	6	–	7
Kansas	0	–	9	1	–	11
$ – BCS representative as conference champion; + – Conference co-champions; Rankings from AP Poll

2012 Conference USA football standings
	Conf.			Overall
Team	W		L	W		L
East Division
UCF xy	7	–	1	10	–	4
East Carolina x	7	–	1	8	–	5
Marshall	4	–	4	5	–	7
Memphis	4	–	4	4	–	8
UAB	2	–	6	3	–	9
Southern Miss	0	–	8	0	–	12
West Division
Tulsa xy$	7	–	1	11	–	3
SMU	5	–	3	7	–	6
Rice	4	–	4	7	–	6
Houston	4	–	4	5	–	7
UTEP	2	–	6	3	–	9
Tulane	2	–	6	2	–	10
Championship: Tulsa 33, UCF 27
$ – Conference champion; x – Division champion/co-champions; y – Championship game participant; Rankings from AP Poll

2012 Mid-American Conference football standings
	Conf.			Overall
Team	W		L	W		L
East Division
Kent State x	8	–	0	11	–	3
Bowling Green	6	–	2	8	–	5
Ohio	4	–	4	9	–	4
Buffalo	3	–	5	4	–	8
Miami (OH)	3	–	5	4	–	8
UMass	1	–	7	1	–	11
Akron	0	–	8	1	–	11
West Division
No. 22 Northern Illinois x$	8	–	0	12	–	2
Toledo	6	–	2	9	–	4
Ball State	6	–	2	9	–	4
Central Michigan	4	–	4	7	–	6
Western Michigan	2	–	6	4	–	8
Eastern Michigan	1	–	7	2	–	10
Championship: Northern Illinois 44, Kent State 37
$ – Conference champion and BCS representative as top non-AQ school to meet automatic qualification criteria; x – Division champion/co-champions; UMass not eligible for conference title or bowl game as part of FBS transition; Rankings from AP Poll

2012 Mountain West Conference football standings
	Conf.			Overall
Team	W		L	W		L
No. 18 Boise State +	7	–	1	11	–	2
Fresno State +	7	–	1	9	–	4
San Diego State +	7	–	1	9	–	4
Air Force	5	–	3	6	–	7
Nevada	4	–	4	7	–	6
Wyoming	3	–	5	4	–	8
Colorado State	3	–	5	4	–	8
UNLV	2	–	6	2	–	11
New Mexico	1	–	7	4	–	9
Hawaii	1	–	7	3	–	9
+ – Conference co-champions; Rankings from AP Poll

2012 Pac-12 Conference football standings
	Conf.			Overall
Team	W		L	W		L
North Division
No. 7 Stanford xy$	8	–	1	12	–	2
No. 2 Oregon x%	8	–	1	12	–	1
No. 20 Oregon State	6	–	3	9	–	4
Washington	5	–	4	7	–	6
California	2	–	7	3	–	9
Washington State	1	–	8	3	–	9
South Division
UCLA xy	6	–	3	9	–	5
Arizona State	5	–	4	8	–	5
USC	5	–	4	7	–	6
Arizona	4	–	5	8	–	5
Utah	3	–	6	5	–	7
Colorado	1	–	8	1	–	11
Championship: Stanford 27, UCLA 24
$ – BCS representative as conference champion; % – BCS at-large representative; x – Division champion/co-champions; y – Championship game participant; Rankings from AP Poll

2012 Southeastern Conference football standings
	Conf.			Overall
Team	W		L	W		L
Eastern Division
No. T–5 Georgia xy	7	–	1	12	–	2
No. 9 Florida x%	7	–	1	11	–	2
No. 8 South Carolina	6	–	2	11	–	2
No. 23 Vanderbilt	5	–	3	9	–	4
Missouri	2	–	6	5	–	7
Tennessee	1	–	7	5	–	7
Kentucky	0	–	8	2	–	10
Western Division
No. 1 Alabama x$#	7	–	1	13	–	1
No. 14 LSU *	6	–	2	10	–	3
No. T–5 Texas A&M	6	–	2	11	–	2
Mississippi State	4	–	4	8	–	5
Ole Miss *	3	–	5	7	–	6
Arkansas	2	–	6	4	–	8
Auburn	0	–	8	3	–	9
Championship: Alabama 32, Georgia 28
# – BCS National Champion; $ – BCS representative as conference champion; % – BCS at-large representative; x – Division champion/co-champions; y – Championship game participant; * Ole Miss and LSU vacated all wins due to NCAA violations.; Rankings from AP Poll

2012 Sun Belt Conference football standings
	Conf.			Overall
Team	W		L	W		L
Arkansas State $	7	–	1	10	–	3
Louisiana–Monroe	6	–	2	8	–	5
Middle Tennessee	6	–	2	8	–	4
Louisiana–Lafayette *	4	–	2	5	–	4
Western Kentucky	4	–	4	7	–	6
Troy	3	–	5	5	–	7
North Texas	3	–	5	4	–	8
Florida Atlantic	2	–	6	3	–	9
FIU	2	–	6	3	–	9
South Alabama **	1	–	7	2	–	11
$ – Conference champion; * – Louisiana–Lafayette vacated 4 wins due to NCAA violations. ** – South Alabama was ineligible for the conference title or a bowl game as part of their transition to the FBS.

2012 Western Athletic Conference football standings
	Conf.			Overall
Team	W		L	W		L
No. 16 Utah State $	6	–	0	11	–	2
No. 21 San Jose State	5	–	1	11	–	2
Louisiana Tech	4	–	2	9	–	3
UTSA *	3	–	3	8	–	4
Texas State *	2	–	4	4	–	8
Idaho	1	–	5	1	–	11
New Mexico State	0	–	6	1	–	11
$ – Conference champion; * Texas State and UTSA were not eligible for conference title or bowl games as part of their transition to the FBS.; Rankings from AP Poll

2012 NCAA Division I FBS independents football records
	Conf.			Overall
Team	W		L	W		L
BYU		–		8	–	5
Navy		–		8	–	5
Army		–		2	–	10
No. 4 Notre Dame %		–		0*	–	0
% – BCS at-large representative; *All wins and national championship appearance for Notre Dame (12–1) in the 2012 season were vacated; Rankings from AP Poll

== FCS team wins over FBS teams ==
Italics denotes FCS teams.

Date	Visiting team	Home team	Site	Result	Attendance	Ref.
August 30	No. 12 (FCS) Eastern Washington	Idaho	Kibbie Dome • Moscow, Idaho	20–3	11,136	
August 30	McNeese State	Middle Tennessee	Johnny "Red" Floyd Stadium • Murfreesboro, Tennessee	27–21	18,690	
September 1	UT Martin	Memphis	Liberty Bowl Memorial Stadium • Memphis, Tennessee	20–17	39,076	
September 1	No. 13 (FCS) Youngstown State	Pittsburgh	Heinz Field • Pittsburgh, Pennsylvania	31–17	40,837	
September 8	No. 18 (FCS) Illinois State	Eastern Michigan	Rynearson Stadium • Ypsilanti, Michigan	31–14	7,654	
September 8	No. 2 (FCS) North Dakota State	Colorado State	Sonny Lubick Field at Hughes Stadium • Fort Collins, Colorado	22–7	23,567	
September 8	Northern Arizona	UNLV	Sam Boyd Stadium • Whitney, Nevada	17–14	15,257	
September 8	Sacramento State	Colorado	Folsom Field • Boulder, Colorado	30–28	46,843	
September 15	Cal Poly	Wyoming	War Memorial Stadium • Laramie, Wyoming	24–22	21,728	
September 29	No. 18 (FCS) Stony Brook	Army	Michie Stadium • West Point, New York	23–3	31,006	
^{#}Rankings from AP Poll released prior to game.

== Conference summaries ==
Rankings reflect the Week 14 AP Poll before the games were played.

=== Conference championship games ===
Conference	Champion	Runner-Up	Score	Offensive Player of the Year	Defensive Player of the Year	Coach of the Year
ACC	No. 13 Florida State	Georgia Tech	21–15	Tajh Boyd, Clemson	Björn Werner, Florida State	David Cutcliffe, Duke
Big Ten	Wisconsin	No. 14 Nebraska	70–31	Braxton Miller, Ohio State	John Simon, Ohio State	Bill O'Brien, Penn State
C-USA	Tulsa	UCF	33–27	Rakeem Cato, Marshall (MVP) & Zach Line, SMU	Kemal Ishmael, UCF	Bill Blankenship, Tulsa
MAC	No. 19 Northern Illinois	No. 18 Kent State	44–37	Jordan Lynch, Northern Illinois	Chris Jones, Bowling Green	Darrell Hazell, Kent State
Pac-12	No. 8 Stanford	No. 17 UCLA	27–24	Marqise Lee, USC	Will Sutton, Arizona State	David Shaw, Stanford
SEC	No. 2 Alabama	No. 3 Georgia	32–28	Johnny Manziel, Texas A&M	Jarvis Jones, Georgia (AP) & Jadeveon Clowney, South Carolina (coaches)	Kevin Sumlin, Texas A&M (AP and coaches) & Will Muschamp, Florida (coaches)

=== Other conference champions ===
Conference	Champion(s)	Record	Offensive Player of the Year	Defensive Player of the Year	Coach of the Year
Big 12	No. 7 Kansas State*; No. 12 Oklahoma	11–1 (8–1); 10–2 (8–1)	Collin Klein, Kansas State	Arthur Brown, Kansas State	Bill Snyder, Kansas State
Big East	Cincinnati Louisville*; Rutgers; Syracuse	9–3 (5–2) 10–2 (5–2); 9–3 (5–2); 7–5 (5–2)	Teddy Bridgewater, Louisville	Khaseem Greene, Rutgers	Charlie Strong, Louisville & Kyle Flood, Rutgers
MWC	No. 25 Boise State; Fresno State; San Diego State	10–2 (7–1); 9–3 (7–1); 9–3 (7–1)	Derek Carr, Fresno State	Phillip Thomas, Fresno State	Rocky Long, San Diego State
Sun Belt	Arkansas State	9–3 (7–1)	Kolton Browning, Louisiana-Monroe	Quanterus Smith, Western Kentucky	Todd Berry, Louisiana-Monroe
WAC	No. 20 Utah State	10–2 (6–0)	Colby Cameron, Louisiana Tech	Travis Johnson, San Jose State	Gary Andersen, Utah State

* Received conference's automatic BCS bowl bid.

== Final BCS rankings ==
BCS	School	Record	Bowl Game
1	Notre Dame	12–0	BCS Championship
2	Alabama	12–1	BCS Championship
3	Florida	11–1	Sugar
4	Oregon	11–1	Fiesta
5	Kansas State	11–1	Fiesta
6	Stanford	11–2	Rose
7	Georgia	11–2	Capital One
8	LSU	10–2	Chick-fil-A
9	Texas A&M	10–2	Cotton
10	South Carolina	10–2	Outback
11	Oklahoma	10–2	Cotton
12	Florida State	11–2	Orange
13	Oregon State	9–3	Alamo
14	Clemson	10–2	Chick-fil-A
15	Northern Illinois	12–1	Orange
16	Nebraska	10–3	Capital One
17	UCLA	9–4	Holiday
18	Michigan	8–4	Outback
19	Boise State	10–2	Maaco Las Vegas
20	Northwestern	9–3	Gator
21	Louisville	10–2	Sugar
22	Utah State	10–2	Famous Idaho Potato
23	Texas	8–4	Alamo
24	San Jose State	10–2	Military
25	Kent State	11–2	GoDaddy.com

- Despite not being in the BCS rankings, Wisconsin (8–5) played in the Rose Bowl by virtue of being the Big Ten Champion.

== Bowl games ==
=== Bowl Championship Series ===
Date	Game	Site	Television	Teams	Affiliations	Winner
Jan. 1	Rose Bowl presented by Vizio	Rose Bowl; Pasadena, California; 5:00 pm	ESPN	No. 6 Stanford Cardinal (11–2); Wisconsin Badgers (8–5)	Pac-12; Big Ten	Stanford 20–14
Jan. 1	Discover Orange Bowl	Sun Life Stadium; Miami Gardens, Florida; 8:30 pm	ESPN	No. 15 Northern Illinois Huskies (12–1); No. 12 Florida State Seminoles (11–2)	MAC (non-AQ); ACC	Florida State 31–10
Jan. 2	Allstate Sugar Bowl	Mercedes-Benz Superdome; New Orleans; 8:30 pm	ESPN	No. 21 Louisville Cardinals (10–2); No. 3 Florida Gators (11–1)	Big East; SEC (At-large)	Louisville 33–23
Jan. 3	Tostitos Fiesta Bowl	University of Phoenix Stadium; Glendale, Arizona; 8:30 pm	ESPN	No. 5 Kansas State Wildcats (11–1); No. 4 Oregon Ducks (11–1)	Big 12; Pac-12 (At-large)	Oregon 35–17
Jan. 7	Discover BCS National Championship	Sun Life Stadium; Miami Gardens, Florida; 8:30 pm	ESPN	No. 1 Notre Dame Fighting Irish (12–0); No. 2 Alabama Crimson Tide (12–1)	Independent; SEC	Alabama 42–14

=== Other bowl games ===
Date	Game	Site	Television	Teams	Affiliations	Results
Dec. 15	Gildan New Mexico Bowl	University Stadium; University of New Mexico; Albuquerque, New Mexico; 1:00 pm	ESPN	Nevada Wolf Pack (7–5); Arizona Wildcats (7–5)	MWC; Pac-12	Arizona 49–48
Dec. 15	Famous Idaho Potato Bowl	Bronco Stadium; Boise State University; Boise, Idaho; 4:30 pm	ESPN	Toledo Rockets (9–3); No. 22 Utah State Aggies (10–2)	MAC; WAC	Utah State 41–15
Dec. 20	San Diego County Credit Union Poinsettia Bowl	Qualcomm Stadium; San Diego; 8:00 pm	ESPN	San Diego State Aztecs (9–3); BYU Cougars (7–5)	MWC; Independent	BYU 23–6
Dec. 21	Beef 'O' Brady's Bowl St. Petersburg	Tropicana Field; St. Petersburg, Florida; 7:30 pm	ESPN	Ball State Cardinals (9–3); UCF Knights (9–4)	MAC; C-USA	UCF 38–17
Dec. 22	R+L Carriers New Orleans Bowl	Mercedes-Benz Superdome; New Orleans; 12:00 pm	ESPN	East Carolina Pirates (8–4); Louisiana–Lafayette Ragin' Cajuns (8–4)	C-USA; Sun Belt	Louisiana–Lafayette 43–34
Dec. 22	Maaco Bowl Las Vegas	Sam Boyd Stadium; University of Nevada, Las Vegas; Whitney, Nevada; 3:30 pm	ESPN	No. 19 Boise State Broncos (10–2); Washington Huskies (7–5)	MWC; Pac-12	Boise State 28–26
Dec. 24	Sheraton Hawaiʻi Bowl	Aloha Stadium; Honolulu, HI; 8:00 pm	ESPN	SMU Mustangs (6–6); Fresno State Bulldogs (9–3)	C-USA; MWC	SMU 43–10
Dec. 26	Little Caesars Pizza Bowl	Ford Field; Detroit; 7:30 pm	ESPN	Western Kentucky Hilltoppers (7–5); Central Michigan Chippewas (6–6)	Sun Belt; MAC	Central Michigan 24–21
Dec. 27	Military Bowl presented by Northrop Grumman	RFK Stadium; Washington, D.C. 3:00 pm	ESPN	No. 24 San Jose State Spartans (10–2); Bowling Green Falcons (8–4)	WAC; MAC	San Jose State 29–20
Dec. 27	Belk Bowl	Bank of America Stadium; Charlotte, North Carolina; 6:30 pm	ESPN	Duke Blue Devils (6–6); Cincinnati Bearcats (9–3)	ACC; Big East	Cincinnati 48–34
Dec. 27	Bridgepoint Education Holiday Bowl	Qualcomm Stadium; San Diego; 9:45 pm	ESPN	Baylor Bears (7–5); No. 17 UCLA Bruins (9–4)	Big 12; Pac-12	Baylor 49–26
Dec. 28	Advocare V100 Independence Bowl	Independence Stadium; Shreveport, Louisiana; 2:00 pm	ESPN	Ohio Bobcats (8–4); Louisiana-Monroe Warhawks (8–4)	MAC; Sun Belt	Ohio 45–14
Dec. 28	Russell Athletic Bowl	Citrus Bowl; Orlando, Florida; 5:30 pm	ESPN	Virginia Tech Hokies (6–6); Rutgers Scarlet Knights (9–3)	ACC; Big East	Virginia Tech 13–10
Dec. 28	Meineke Car Care Bowl of Texas	Reliant Stadium; Houston; 9:00 pm	ESPN	Minnesota Golden Gophers (6–6); Texas Tech Red Raiders (7–5)	Big Ten; Big 12	Texas Tech 34–31
Dec. 29	Bell Helicopter Armed Forces Bowl	Amon G. Carter Stadium; Texas Christian University; Fort Worth, Texas; 11:45 am	ESPN	Rice Owls (6–6); Air Force Falcons (6–6)	C-USA; MWC	Rice 33–14
Dec. 29	Kraft Fight Hunger Bowl	AT&T Park; San Francisco; 3:15 pm	ESPN2	Arizona State Sun Devils (7–5); Navy Midshipmen (7–4)	Pac-12; Independent	Arizona State 62–28
Dec. 29	New Era Pinstripe Bowl	Yankee Stadium; Bronx, New York; 3:15 pm	ESPN	Syracuse Orange (7–5); West Virginia Mountaineers (7–5)	Big East; Big 12	Syracuse 38–14
Dec. 29	Valero Alamo Bowl	Alamodome; San Antonio, Texas; 6:45 pm	ESPN	No. 23 Texas Longhorns (8–4); No. 13 Oregon State Beavers (9–3)	Big 12; Pac-12	Texas 31–27
Dec. 29	Buffalo Wild Wings Bowl	Sun Devil Stadium; Arizona State University; Tempe, Arizona; 10:15 pm	ESPN	Michigan State Spartans (6–6); TCU Horned Frogs (7–5)	Big Ten; Big 12	Michigan State 17–16
Dec. 31	Franklin American Mortgage Music City Bowl	LP Field; Nashville, Tennessee; 12:05 pm	ESPN	Vanderbilt Commodores (8–4); NC State Wolfpack (7–5)	SEC; ACC	Vanderbilt 38–24
Dec. 31	Hyundai Sun Bowl	Sun Bowl Stadium; University of Texas El Paso; El Paso, Texas; 2:00 pm	CBS	Georgia Tech Yellow Jackets (6–7); USC Trojans (7–5)	ACC; Pac-12	Georgia Tech 21–7
Dec. 31	Autozone Liberty Bowl	Liberty Bowl Memorial Stadium; Memphis, Tennessee; 3:30 pm	ESPN	Iowa State Cyclones (6–6); Tulsa Golden Hurricane (10–3)	Big 12; C-USA	Tulsa 31–17
Dec. 31	Chick-fil-A Bowl	Georgia Dome; Atlanta; 7:30 pm	ESPN	No. 14 Clemson Tigers (10–2); No. 8 LSU Tigers (10–2)	ACC; SEC	Clemson 25–24
Jan. 1	TaxSlayer.com Gator Bowl	EverBank Field; Jacksonville, Florida; 12:00 pm	ESPN2	Mississippi State Bulldogs (8–4); No. 20 Northwestern Wildcats (9–3)	SEC; Big Ten	Northwestern 34–20
Jan. 1	Heart of Dallas Bowl	Cotton Bowl; Dallas; 12:00 pm	ESPNU	Purdue Boilermakers (6–6); Oklahoma State Cowboys (7–5)	Big Ten; Big 12	Oklahoma State 58–14
Jan. 1	Capital One Bowl	Citrus Bowl; Orlando, Florida; 1:00 pm	ABC	No. 7 Georgia Bulldogs (11–2); No. 16 Nebraska Cornhuskers (10–3)	SEC; Big Ten	Georgia 45–31
Jan. 1	Outback Bowl	Raymond James Stadium; Tampa, Florida; 1:00 pm	ESPN	No. 10 South Carolina Gamecocks (10–2); No. 18 Michigan Wolverines (8–4)	SEC; Big Ten	South Carolina 33–28
Jan. 4	AT&T Cotton Bowl Classic	Cowboys Stadium; Arlington, Texas; 8:00 pm	FOX	No. 9 Texas A&M Aggies (10–2); No. 11 Oklahoma Sooners (10–2)	SEC; Big 12	Texas A&M 41–13
Jan. 5	BBVA Compass Bowl	Legion Field; Birmingham, Alabama; 1:00 pm	ESPN	Pittsburgh Panthers (6–6); Ole Miss Rebels (6–6)	Big East; SEC	Ole Miss 38–17
Jan. 6	GoDaddy.com Bowl	Ladd–Peebles Stadium; Mobile, Alabama; 9:00 pm	ESPN	No. 25 Kent State Golden Flashes (11–2); Arkansas State Red Wolves (9–3)	MAC; Sun Belt	Arkansas State 17–13

=== Bowl Challenge Cup standings ===
Conference	Total Games	Wins	Losses	Pct.
WAC	2	2	0	1.000
C-USA	5	4	1	.800
ACC	6	4	2	.667
SEC	9	6	3	.667
Big East	5	3	2	.600
Pac-12	8	4	4	.500
Sun Belt	4	2	2	.500
Big 12	9	4	5	.444
Independents	3	1	2	.333
Big Ten	7	2	5	.286
MAC	7	2	5	.286
MWC	5	1	4	.200

== Awards and honors ==
=== Heisman Trophy voting ===
The Heisman Trophy is given to the year's most outstanding player

Player	School	Position	1st	2nd	3rd	Total
Johnny Manziel	Texas A&M	QB	474	252	103	2,029
Manti Te'o	Notre Dame	LB	321	309	126	1,706
Collin Klein	Kansas State	QB	60	197	320	894
Marqise Lee	USC	WR	19	33	84	207
Braxton Miller	Ohio State	QB	3	29	77	144
Jadeveon Clowney	South Carolina	DE	4	13	23	61
Jordan Lynch	Northern Illinois	QB	3	8	27	52
Tavon Austin	West Virginia	WR	6	4	21	47
Kenjon Barner	Oregon	RB	1	12	15	42
Jarvis Jones	Georgia	LB	1	10	18	41

=== Other major awards ===
- Archie Griffin Award (MVP): Johnny Manziel, Texas A&M
- AP Player of the Year: Johnny Manziel, Texas A&M
- Chic Harley Award (Player of the Year): Johnny Manziel, Texas A&M
- Maxwell Award (top player): Manti Te'o, Notre Dame
- SN Player of the Year: Johnny Manziel, Texas A&M
- Walter Camp Award (top player): Manti Te'o, Notre Dame

=== Special awards ===
- Burlsworth Trophy (top player who began as walk-on): Matt McGloin, Penn State
- Paul Hornung Award (most versatile player): Tavon Austin, West Virginia
- Campbell Trophy ("academic Heisman"): Barrett Jones, Alabama
- Wuerffel Trophy (humanitarian-athlete): Matt Barkley, USC

=== Offense ===
==== Quarterback ====
- Davey O'Brien Award (quarterback): Johnny Manziel, Texas A&M
- Johnny Unitas Award (senior/4th year quarterback): Collin Klein, Kansas State
- Kellen Moore Award (quarterback): Collin Klein, Kansas State
- Manning Award (quarterback): Johnny Manziel, Texas A&M
- Sammy Baugh Trophy (quarterback, specifically passer): Colby Cameron, Louisiana Tech

==== Running back ====
- Doak Walker Award (running back): Montee Ball, Wisconsin
- Jim Brown Trophy (running back): Montee Ball, Wisconsin

==== Wide receiver ====
- Fred Biletnikoff Award (wide receiver): Marqise Lee, USC
- Paul Warfield Trophy (wide receiver): Marqise Lee, USC

==== Tight end ====
- John Mackey Award (tight end): Tyler Eifert, Notre Dame

==== Lineman ====
- Dave Rimington Trophy (center): Barrett Jones, Alabama
- Outland Trophy (interior lineman): Luke Joeckel, Texas A&M

=== Defense ===
- Bronko Nagurski Trophy (defensive player): Manti Te'o, Notre Dame
- Chuck Bednarik Award (defensive player): Manti Te'o, Notre Dame
- Lott Trophy (defensive impact): Manti Te'o, Notre Dame

==== Defensive line ====
- Bill Willis Award (defensive lineman): John Simon, Ohio State
- Dick Butkus Award (linebacker): Manti Te'o, Notre Dame
- Jack Lambert Trophy (linebacker): Jarvis Jones, Georgia
- Lombardi Award (defensive lineman): Manti Te'o, Notre Dame
- Ted Hendricks Award (defensive end): Jadeveon Clowney, South Carolina

==== Defensive back ====
- Jim Thorpe Award (defensive back): Johnthan Banks, Mississippi State

=== Special teams ===
- Lou Groza Award (placekicker): Cairo Santos, Tulane
- Ray Guy Award (punter): Ryan Allen, Louisiana Tech

=== Coaches ===
- AP Coach of the Year: Brian Kelly, Notre Dame
- Bobby Bowden National Collegiate Coach of the Year Award: Nick Saban, Alabama
- Bobby Dodd Coach of the Year Award: Bill Snyder, Kansas State
- Eddie Robinson Coach of the Year: Brian Kelly, Notre Dame
- Maxwell Coach of the Year: Bill O'Brien, Penn State
- Paul "Bear" Bryant Award: Bill O'Brien, Penn State
- SN Coach of the Year: Brian Kelly, Notre Dame
- The Home Depot Coach of the Year Award: Brian Kelly, Notre Dame
- Woody Hayes Trophy: Urban Meyer, Ohio State
- Walter Camp Coach of the Year: Brian Kelly, Notre Dame

==== Assistants ====
- AFCA Assistant Coach of the Year: Kirby Smart, Alabama
- Broyles Award: Bob Diaco, Notre Dame

== Records ==
- The FBS record for most consecutive passes attempted from the start of a season with no interceptions, previously set by Trent Dilfer of Fresno State in 1993, was broken twice on October 20:
  - First, in a day game, Geno Smith of West Virginia set a new mark of 273 before throwing his first interception in a 55–14 loss to Kansas State.
  - In a night game, Colby Cameron of Louisiana Tech surpassed that record in the Bulldogs' 70–28 win over Idaho, ending the game at 275 attempts in the season without an interception.
- On November 10, Cameron broke Russell Wilson's FBS career record for most consecutive passes attempted without an interception (379) in Louisiana Tech's 62–55 win over Texas State. Cameron's interception-free streak ended one week later in the second quarter of the Bulldogs' 48–41 overtime loss to Utah State. His single-season streak ended at 428 attempts, and his overall record, which included pass attempts in the 2011 Poinsettia Bowl, ended at 444.
- In the same game in which Cameron broke Wilson's no-interceptions mark, his teammate, running back Kenneth Dixon, set three single-season FBS freshman records:
  - Dixon finished the game with 25 total touchdowns, breaking the record of 23 set by Marshall Faulk of San Diego State in 1991. He finished the season with 28 touchdowns (the Bulldogs did not play in a bowl despite a 9–3 record).
  - Of those 25 touchdowns, 24 were on the ground, breaking the previous record of 21 rushing touchdowns set by Faulk and equaled in 2009 by Ryan Williams of Virginia Tech. Dixon ended the season with 27 rushing TDs.
  - Dixon ended the game with 150 points on the season, breaking Faulk's previous record of 140. He ended the season with 168 points.
- On November 24, Wisconsin running back Montee Ball scored his 79th career touchdown during the Badgers' 24–21 loss to Penn State, breaking the previous record of Miami (OH) running back Travis Prentice.
- In the Big Ten Championship Game on December 1, Ball added to his collection of FBS records. In the Badgers' 70–31 win over Nebraska, he scored three touchdowns, all on the ground. Ball, who had entered the game tied with Prentice for the most FBS career rushing touchdowns, took sole possession of the record, ending the game with 76. He also tied Prentice's FBS record for most career games with multiple touchdowns, at 25.

== Coaching changes ==
This list is restricted to coaching changes that took place on or after May 1, 2012. For coaching changes that occurred earlier in 2012, see 2011 NCAA Division I FBS end-of-season coaching changes.

=== Preseason and in-season ===
Team	Outgoing coach	Date	Reason	Replacement
Idaho	Robb Akey	October 21	Fired	Jason Gesser (interim)
Tennessee	Derek Dooley	November 18	Fired	Jim Chaney (interim)

=== End of season ===
Team	Outgoing coach	Date announced	Reason	Replacement
Kentucky	Joker Phillips	November 4	Fired	Mark Stoops
Western Michigan	Bill Cubit	November 17	Fired	P. J. Fleck
UTEP	Mike Price	November 19	Retired	Sean Kugler
California	Jeff Tedford	November 20	Fired	Sonny Dykes
Arkansas	John L. Smith	November 24	Fired	Bret Bielema
Auburn	Gene Chizik	November 25	Fired	Gus Malzahn
Boston College	Frank Spaziani	November 25	Fired	Steve Addazio
Colorado	Jon Embree	November 25	Fired	Mike MacIntyre
NC State	Tom O'Brien	November 25	Fired	Dave Doeren
Purdue	Danny Hope	November 25	Fired	Darrell Hazell
Southern Miss	Ellis Johnson	November 27	Fired	Todd Monken
Northern Illinois	Dave Doeren	December 1	Hired by NC State	Rod Carey
South Florida	Skip Holtz	December 2	Fired	Willie Taggart
Idaho	Jason Gesser	December 3	Permanent replacement	Paul Petrino
Wisconsin	Bret Bielema	December 4	Hired by Arkansas	Barry Alvarez (interim)
Arkansas State	Gus Malzahn	December 4	Hired by Auburn	Bryan Harsin
Temple	Steve Addazio	December 4	Hired by Boston College	Matt Rhule
Kent State	Darrell Hazell	December 4	Hired by Purdue	Paul Haynes
FIU	Mario Cristobal	December 5	Fired	Ron Turner
Louisiana Tech	Sonny Dykes	December 5	Hired by California	Skip Holtz
Tennessee	Jim Chaney	December 7	Permanent replacement	Butch Jones
Cincinnati	Butch Jones	December 7	Hired by Tennessee	Tommy Tuberville
Western Kentucky	Willie Taggart	December 7	Hired by South Florida	Bobby Petrino
Texas Tech	Tommy Tuberville	December 8	Hired by Cincinnati	Kliff Kingsbury
San Jose State	Mike MacIntyre	December 10	Hired by Colorado	Ron Caragher
Wisconsin	Barry Alvarez	December 19	Permanent replacement	Gary Andersen
Utah State	Gary Andersen	December 19	Hired by Wisconsin	Matt Wells
Nevada	Chris Ault	December 28	Retired	Brian Polian
Syracuse	Doug Marrone	January 6	Hired by Buffalo Bills	Scott Shafer
Oregon	Chip Kelly	January 16	Hired by Philadelphia Eagles	Mark Helfrich
New Mexico State	DeWayne Walker	January 24	Hired by Jacksonville Jaguars (assistant)	Doug Martin

== TV ratings ==
=== Most watched regular season games in 2012 ===
Rank	Date	Matchup	Channel	Viewers	TV Rating	Significance
1	December 1, 4:00 ET	No. 3 Georgia vs. No. 2 Alabama	CBS	16.2 Million*	9.8 Rating	SEC Championship
2	November 24, 8:00 ET	No. 1 Notre Dame vs. USC	ABC	16.1 Million*	9.4 Rating	Notre Dame–USC rivalry
3	November 3, 8:00 ET	No. 1 Alabama vs. No. 5 LSU	CBS	11.3 Million	6.8 Rating	Alabama–LSU rivalry
4	November 10, 3:30 ET	No. 15 Texas A&M vs. No. 1 Alabama	CBS	9.6 Million	6.1 Rating	Manziel beats Bama
5	November 24, 12:00 ET	No. 19 Michigan vs. No. 4** Ohio State	ABC	9.5 Million	5.8 Rating	The Game
6	October 27, 8:00 ET	No. 5 Notre Dame vs. No. 8 Oklahoma	ABC	8.6 Million	5.2 Rating	
7	November 24, 3:30 ET	No. 4 Florida vs. No. 10 Florida State	ABC	8.5 Million	5.1 Rating	Florida–Florida State rivalry
8	November 17, 8:00 ET	No. 13 Stanford vs. No. 2 Oregon	ABC	8.3 Million	5.1 Rating	
9	September 1, 8:00 ET	No. 8** Michigan vs. No. 2** Alabama	ABC	7.9 Million	4.8 Rating	Cowboys Classic
10	October 6, 3:30 ET	No. 4** LSU vs. No. 10** Florida	CBS	7.5 Million	4.6 Rating	Florida–LSU rivalry

Note(*): Games rate in the top six most watched games of the last 20 years.

Note(**): Rankings reflect AP Poll Standings. (All other rankings reflect BCS Standings at the time of the game)

== Attendances ==
Team	G	Total	Average
Air Force	6	192,087	32,015
Akron	6	55,652	9,275
Alabama	7	712,052	101,722
UAB	6	91,623	15,271
Arizona	8	383,451	47,931
Arizona State	6	341,007	56,835
Arkansas	7	476,321	68,046
Arkansas State	6	158,389	26,398
Army	7	225,432	32,205
Auburn	7	578,521	82,646
Ball State	5	64,649	12,930
Baylor	6	247,165	41,194
Boise State	6	212,425	35,404
Boston College	6	222,118	37,020
Bowling Green	6	94,625	15,771
BYU	6	366,965	61,161
Buffalo	6	79,451	13,242
California	7	391,130	55,876
UCF	6	207,646	34,608
Central Michigan	7	112,249	16,036
Cincinnati	7	203,965	29,138
Clemson	7	569,988	81,427
Colorado	6	272,235	45,373
Colorado State	6	115,501	19,250
Connecticut	6	208,032	34,672
Duke	7	197,190	28,170
East Carolina	6	282,076	47,013
Eastern Michigan	6	23,536	3,923
Florida	7	613,182	87,597
Florida Atlantic	5	67,293	13,459
FIU	6	81,806	13,634
Florida State	7	529,208	75,601
Fresno State	6	185,488	30,915
Georgia	7	648,922	92,703
Georgia Tech	7	307,682	43,955
Hawaii	6	180,186	30,031
Houston	7	190,729	27,247
Idaho	5	62,908	12,582
Illinois	7	318,950	45,564
Indiana	6	268,813	44,802
Iowa	7	493,315	70,474
Iowa State	7	386,917	55,274
Kansas	6	247,971	41,329
Kansas State	7	351,943	50,278
Kent State	5	89,401	17,880
Kentucky	7	347,838	49,691
Louisiana–Lafayette	6	137,190	22,865
Louisiana–Monroe	6	149,884	24,981
LSU	8	741,005	92,626
Louisiana Tech	6	155,045	25,841
Louisville	7	349,938	49,991
Marshall	6	149,377	24,896
Maryland	6	216,135	36,023
Memphis	6	146,227	24,371
Miami Hurricanes	6	286,315	47,719
Miami RedHawks	5	76,665	15,333
Michigan	6	673,511	112,252
Michigan State	7	527,671	75,382
Middle Tennessee	5	88,691	17,738
Minnesota	7	326,456	46,637
Mississippi State	7	389,396	55,628
Missouri	7	472,333	67,476
Navy	5	161,817	32,363
Nebraska	7	598,617	85,517
Nevada	6	140,591	23,432
UNLV	7	106,456	15,208
New Mexico	6	133,840	22,307
New Mexico State	6	85,480	14,247
North Carolina	7	352,000	50,286
NC State	6	324,638	54,106
North Texas	5	94,634	18,927
Northern Illinois	7	146,139	20,877
Northwestern	7	249,877	35,697
Notre Dame	6	484,770	80,795
Ohio	6	131,063	21,844
Ohio State	8	842,637	105,330
Oklahoma	6	511,460	85,243
Oklahoma State	7	395,897	56,557
Ole Miss	7	399,462	57,066
Oregon	7	402,429	57,490
Oregon State	7	303,971	43,424
Penn State	7	677,108	96,730
Pittsburgh	6	248,964	41,494
Purdue	7	305,118	43,588
Rice	5	101,623	20,325
Rutgers	6	295,129	49,188
San Diego State	8	247,029	30,879
San Jose State	6	64,732	10,789
SMU	7	149,042	21,292
South Carolina	7	560,008	80,001
South Florida	6	264,780	44,130
Southern California	6	527,670	87,945
Southern Miss	6	154,503	25,751
Stanford	7	303,402	43,343
Syracuse	5	189,763	37,953
Temple	6	159,481	26,580
Tennessee	7	629,752	89,965
Texas	6	605,304	100,884
Texas A&M	6	522,083	87,014
TCU	6	276,281	46,047
UTEP	6	176,244	29,374
Texas Tech	6	343,251	57,209
Toledo	6	123,309	20,552
Troy	6	125,709	20,952
Tulane	7	126,593	18,085
Tulsa	7	140,143	20,020
UCLA	7	479,370	68,481
Utah	6	272,080	45,347
Utah State	6	120,321	20,054
Vanderbilt	6	227,161	37,860
Virginia	7	326,548	46,650
Virginia Tech	6	393,792	65,632
Wake Forest	7	202,387	28,912
Washington	6	351,699	58,617
Washington State	5	151,259	30,252
West Virginia	7	391,409	55,916
Western Kentucky	6	104,488	17,415
Western Michigan	6	87,475	14,579
Wisconsin	7	560,039	80,006
Wyoming	6	117,327	19,555
