= 2012 SEC Championship Game =

- Conference Championship
- 2012 SEC Championship Logo
Alabama Crimson Tide	Georgia Bulldogs
(11–1)	(11–1)
32	28
Head coach: Nick Saban	Head coach: Mark Richt
AP / Coaches / BCS; 2 / 2 / 2	AP / Coaches / BCS; 3 / 3 / 3
	1	2	3	4	Total
Alabama	0	10	8	14	32
Georgia	0	7	14	7	28
- Date: December 1, 2012
- Season: 2012
- Stadium: Georgia Dome
- Location: Atlanta, Georgia
- MVP: RB Eddie Lacy, Alabama
- Favorite: Alabama by 7½
- Referee: Tom Ritter
- Halftime show: Dr Pepper $100,000 Tuition Throw
- Attendance: 75,624

United States TV coverage
- Network: CBS
- Announcers: Verne Lundquist (play-by-play); Gary Danielson (color); Tracy Wolfson (sideline)
- Nielsen ratings: 16.2 million viewers

2012 Southeastern Conference football standings
	Conf.			Overall
Team	W		L	W		L
Eastern Division
No. T–5 Georgia xy	7	–	1	12	–	2
No. 9 Florida x%	7	–	1	11	–	2
No. 8 South Carolina	6	–	2	11	–	2
No. 23 Vanderbilt	5	–	3	9	–	4
Missouri	2	–	6	5	–	7
Tennessee	1	–	7	5	–	7
Kentucky	0	–	8	2	–	10
Western Division
No. 1 Alabama x$#	7	–	1	13	–	1
No. 14 LSU *	6	–	2	10	–	3
No. T–5 Texas A&M	6	–	2	11	–	2
Mississippi State	4	–	4	8	–	5
Ole Miss *	3	–	5	7	–	6
Arkansas	2	–	6	4	–	8
Auburn	0	–	8	3	–	9
Championship: Alabama 32, Georgia 28
# – BCS National Champion; $ – BCS representative as conference champion; % – BCS at-large representative; x – Division champion/co-champions; y – Championship game participant; * Ole Miss and LSU vacated all wins due to NCAA violations.; Rankings from AP Poll

The 2012 SEC Championship Game was played on December 1, 2012, in the Georgia Dome in Atlanta, and determined both the 2012 football champion of the Southeastern Conference (SEC). The game featured the Georgia Bulldogs, winners of the SEC East Division versus the Alabama Crimson Tide, the winner of the SEC West Division.

Because Alabama and Georgia were respectively ranked 2 and 3, the game was considered a de facto semifinal game, as the winner would automatically face the undefeated Notre Dame Fighting Irish in the National Championship with no vote necessary. Georgia was the designated "home" team. The game was televised by CBS Sports for the twelfth straight season. Kickoff was scheduled at 4:00 (EST). Alabama won the game 32–28 improving their record to 4–4 in the title game. Alabama's Eddie Lacy was named MVP after rushing for 181 yards and two touchdowns. The game at the time was the most watched college football game of the 2012 season (it would be surpassed by the 2013 BCS National Championship Game on January 7, 2013) with the game receiving a 10.1 share or 21.0 million viewers tuned in.

== Background ==
Alabama had won the 2012 BCS National Championship Game after defeating LSU 21-0 in a rematch of its "Game of the Century" matchup earlier in the season, and came into the 2012 season ranked second in the AP preseason poll behind USC.

Georgia appeared in the 2011 SEC Championship Game, but was soundly defeated by LSU 42–10. After losing its Outback Bowl game against Michigan State, Georgia was ranked 19th in the final AP poll of 2011, but rose to sixth in the 2012 preseason rankings.

At the start of week 12 of the 2012 season, both Alabama (with a loss to Texas A&M) and Georgia (having lost to South Carolina) were 9-1 overall and 6-1 in the SEC, with Alabama being ranked fourth in the AP poll and Georgia ranked fifth. Above them were Oregon, Kansas State, and Notre Dame, all undefeated. The only other undefeated FBS team was Ohio State, right behind Georgia at sixth, but they were ineligible to participate in postseason games that year due to NCAA sanctions. November 17, 2012 saw both Oregon and Kansas State suffer their first losses of the season, while Notre Dame remained unbeaten and both Alabama and Georgia won their non-conference matchups. This led to Notre Dame taking over first place, with Alabama jumping to second place and Georgia to third. At this point it was clear that if all three teams won the remainder of their games, Notre Dame would secure a spot in the BCS National Championship game, and Alabama and Georgia would win their respective SEC divisions and face each other in the conference championship to determine Notre Dame's opponent.

The following week, Notre Dame, Alabama, and Georgia all won their rivalry games and were ranked first, second, and third respectively in the AP poll and BCS rankings. This rare scenario in which the path to the national championship was straightforward contrasted with the controversy of many other years of the BCS, including the previous year, when the Alabama-LSU rematch was widely panned as uncompetitive and uninteresting compared to potential alternative matchups.

== Game summary ==
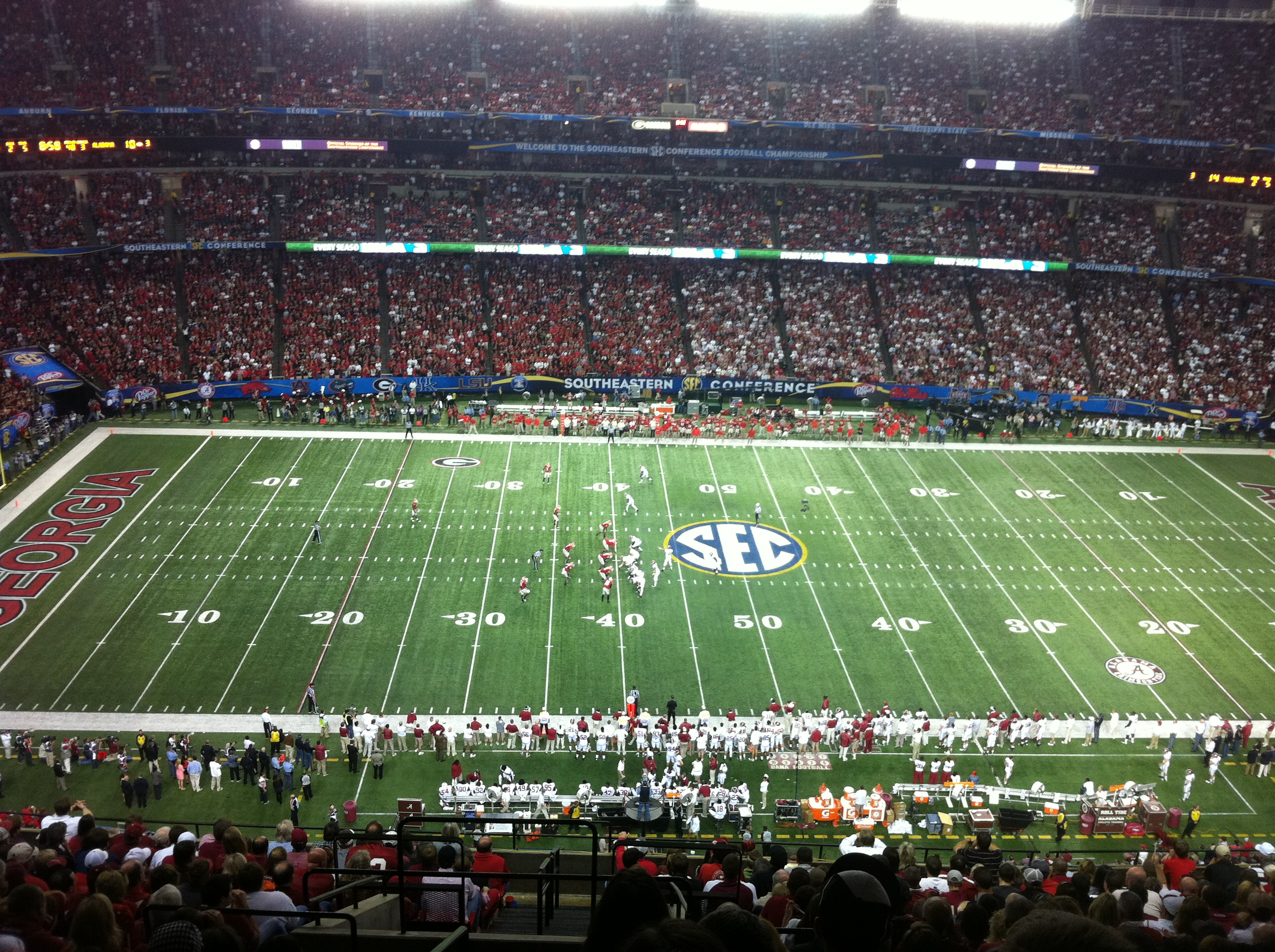
Alabama's offense lines up against Georgia's defense during the third quarter.

After the first-ever scoreless first quarter in this game's history, the teams traded touchdowns in the second quarter. Alabama kicked a field goal as time expired in the first half to take a 10–7 lead.

Georgia took the game's largest lead in the third quarter with two touchdowns, the second of which was an Alec Ogletree 55-yard return of a blocked field goal. Alabama answered with a rushing touchdown and two-point conversion by T. J. Yeldon. Eddie Lacy's second touchdown of the game put the Tide ahead as the fourth quarter began. These two Alabama running backs each finished the game with over 150 yards; they are the first duo of running backs in SEC championship history to each have even 100 yards.

The Bulldogs once again went in front by three on their very next drive, when they took only two minutes to answer with a Todd Gurley touchdown run. Georgia's defense continued to allow Alabama yardage on the ground, but they forced an Alabama punt with 7:14 remaining, still up by three. Georgia could only keep the ball for four plays and two minutes, though, as they punted back to the Tide with 5:24 left in the game.

Georgia's defense was "stacking the line," using an extra defender to prevent gains on the ground. Alabama took advantage: on first down with three minutes left, quarterback A. J. McCarron used play action to free up Amari Cooper for a 45-yard touchdown pass.

The Alabama defense forced Georgia to punt with two minutes left. But, Georgia used all of their timeouts while their defense also held firm. A punt gave Georgia one last drive, starting from their own 15-yard line. It seemed as if the game was over when Dee Milliner appeared to have intercepted a pass on the fourth play of the drive. However, replay overturned the interception ruling, and Georgia again had an opportunity.

Three more long passes brought the Bulldogs all the way to the 8-yard line with the clock winding down. With 9 seconds to play, an Aaron Murray pass toward the end zone was deflected by CJ Mosley toward Chris Conley in the field of play. Surprised to see the ball—he was not the intended receiver on the play—Conley caught the pass as he fell down in-bounds at the 5-yard line. The clock ran out before Georgia could run another play.

== Scoring summary ==
Scoring summary

Quarter	Time	Drive			Team	Scoring information	Score	
Quarter	Time	Plays	Yards	TOP	Team	Scoring information	Alabama	Georgia
2	13:59	13	87	4:48	Georgia	Jay Rome 19-yard touchdown reception from Aaron Murray, Marshall Morgan kick good	0	7
2	1:59	6	70	3:05	Alabama	Eddie Lacy 41-yard touchdown run, Jeremy Shelley kick good	7	7
2	0:00	5	42	1:15	Alabama	22-yard field goal by Jeremy Shelley	10	7
3	12:09	9	75	2:51	Georgia	Todd Gurley 3-yard touchdown run, Marshall Morgan kick good	10	14
3	6:31	11	43	5:38	Georgia	Cade Foster 49-yd Field Goal blocked, returned by Alec Ogletree for 55 yards for a touchdown	10	21
3	4:19	4	62	2:12	Alabama	T. J. Yeldon 10-yard touchdown run, 2-point run good	18	21
4	14:57	7	74	3:07	Alabama	Eddie Lacy 1-yard touchdown run, Jeremy Shelley kick good	25	21
4	12:54	5	75	2:03	Georgia	Todd Gurley 10-yard touchdown run, Marshall Morgan kick good	25	28
4	3:15	4	55	2:09	Alabama	Amari Cooper 44-yard touchdown reception from A. J. McCarron, Jeremy Shelley kick good	32	28
"TOP" = time of possession. For other American football terms, see Glossary of American football.							32	28

== Notes ==
This was Alabama's 8th appearance in the title game. The previous seven appearances were all against the Florida Gators. This was Georgia's 5th appearance and second consecutive SEC Championship game. This was the first meeting between the schools since 2008. From 2006 to 2012, the winner of this game played in the BCS National Championship Game seven straight times with a record of 6–1 (LSU was defeated by fellow SEC member Alabama following winning the 2011 SEC Championship Game).

Alabama's victory in this game, along with their ranking based on their season-long performance, earned them a spot in the BCS National Championship Game, where they defeated Notre Dame 42–14. They finished the season as the top-ranked team in the AP poll.

Georgia went on to appear in the Capital One Bowl, where they defeated Oklahoma 45-31. They were ranked fifth in the final AP poll of the season.
