= 2012 Mississippi State Bulldogs football team =

American college football season

2012 Mississippi State Bulldogs football

Gator Bowl, L 20–34 vs. Northwestern
- Conference: Southeastern Conference
- Western Division
- Record: 8–5 (4–4 SEC)
- Head coach: Dan Mullen (4th season)
- Offensive coordinator: Les Koenning (4th season)
- Offensive scheme: Spread option
- Co-defensive coordinators: Chris Wilson (3rd season); Geoff Collins (2nd season)
- Base defense: 4–3
- Home stadium: Davis Wade Stadium

2012 Southeastern Conference football standings
	Conf.			Overall
Team	W		L	W		L
Eastern Division
No. T–5 Georgia xy	7	–	1	12	–	2
No. 9 Florida x%	7	–	1	11	–	2
No. 8 South Carolina	6	–	2	11	–	2
No. 23 Vanderbilt	5	–	3	9	–	4
Missouri	2	–	6	5	–	7
Tennessee	1	–	7	5	–	7
Kentucky	0	–	8	2	–	10
Western Division
No. 1 Alabama x$#	7	–	1	13	–	1
No. 14 LSU *	6	–	2	10	–	3
No. T–5 Texas A&M	6	–	2	11	–	2
Mississippi State	4	–	4	8	–	5
Ole Miss *	3	–	5	7	–	6
Arkansas	2	–	6	4	–	8
Auburn	0	–	8	3	–	9
Championship: Alabama 32, Georgia 28
# – BCS National Champion; $ – BCS representative as conference champion; % – BCS at-large representative; x – Division champion/co-champions; y – Championship game participant; * Ole Miss and LSU vacated all wins due to NCAA violations.; Rankings from AP Poll

The 2012 Mississippi State Bulldogs football team represented Mississippi State University in the 2012 NCAA Division I FBS football season. The team was coached by Dan Mullen, who was in his fourth season with Mississippi State. The Bulldogs played their home games at Davis Wade Stadium in Starkville, Mississippi, and competed in the Western Division of the Southeastern Conference (SEC).

== Schedule ==
Date	Time	Opponent	Rank	Site	TV	Result	Attendance
September 1	6:00 pm	Jackson State*		Davis Wade Stadium; Starkville, MS	SECRN	W 56–9	55,082
September 8	11:00 am	Auburn		Davis Wade Stadium; Starkville, MS	ESPN	W 28–10	56,111
September 15	6:00 pm	at Troy*		Veterans Memorial Stadium; Troy, AL	ESPN3	W 30–24	29,013
September 22	6:00 pm	South Alabama*	No. 23	Davis Wade Stadium; Starkville, MS	Bulldog Sports Properties	W 30–10	55,186
October 6	11:21 am	at Kentucky	No. 20	Commonwealth Stadium; Lexington, KY	SECN	W 27–14	49,498
October 13	8:00 pm	Tennessee	No. 19	Davis Wade Stadium; Starkville, MS	ESPN2	W 41–31	57,831
October 20	6:00 pm	Middle Tennessee*^{†}	No. 15	Davis Wade Stadium; Starkville, MS	ESPN2	W 45–3	55,108
October 27	7:30 pm	at No. 1 Alabama	No. 11	Bryant–Denny Stadium; Tuscaloosa, AL (rivalry)	ESPN	L 7–38	101,821
November 3	11:00 am	No. 16 Texas A&M	No. 17	Davis Wade Stadium; Starkville, MS	ESPN	L 13–38	55,240
November 10	6:00 pm	at No. 5 LSU	No. 22	Tiger Stadium; Baton Rouge, LA (rivalry)	ESPN	L 17–37	92,831
November 17	11:21 am	Arkansas		Davis Wade Stadium; Starkville, MS	SECN	W 45–14	54,838
November 24	6:00 pm	at Ole Miss	No. 25	Vaught–Hemingway Stadium; Oxford, MS (Egg Bowl)	ESPNU	L 24–41	61,005
January 1	11:00 am	vs. No. 21 Northwestern*		EverBank Field; Jacksonville, FL (Gator Bowl)	ESPN2	L 20–34	48,612
*Non-conference game; ^{†}Homecoming; Rankings from AP Poll released prior to the game; All times are in Central time

== Rankings ==
Ranking movements Legend: ██ Increase in ranking ██ Decrease in ranking — = Not ranked RV = Received votes
	Week															
Poll	Pre	1	2	3	4	5	6	7	8	9	10	11	12	13	14	Final
AP	RV	RV	RV	23	21	20	19	15	13	17	22	RV	25	RV	—	—
Coaches	RV	RV	RV	23	19	19	18	16	12	18	23	RV	24	RV	RV	—
Harris	Not released						17	14	12	15	20	25	23	RV	RV	Not released
BCS	Not released							12	11	15	21	—	—	—	—	Not released
