= Zach Rogers =

American football player (born 1990)

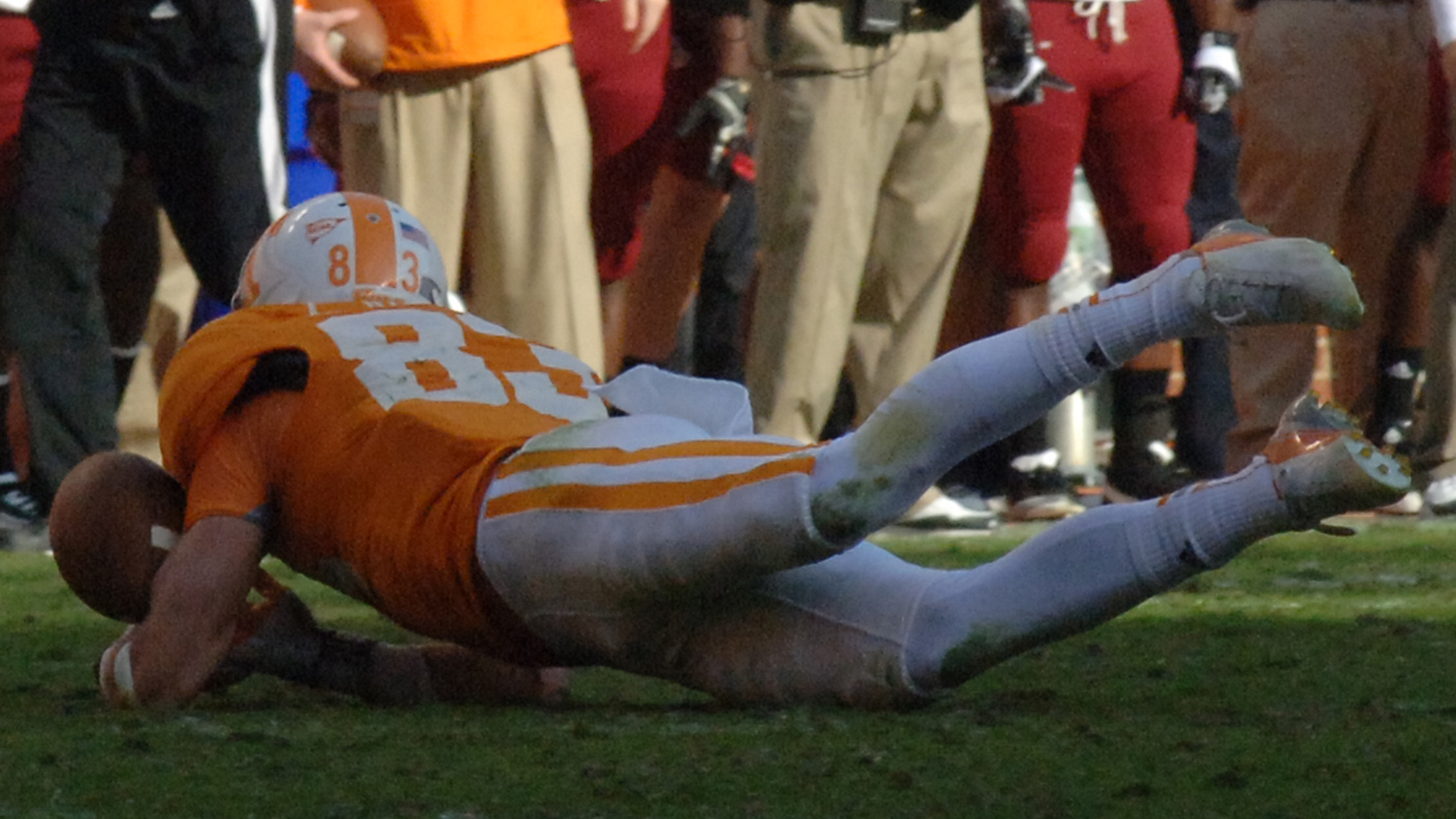
- Rogers with Tennessee in 2012

No. 9
- Position: Wide receiver

Personal information
- Born: November 22, 1990 (age 35); Nashville, Tennessee, U.S.
- Listed height: 6 ft 0 in (1.83 m)
- Listed weight: 172 lb (78 kg)

Career information
- High school: Lipscomb (Nashville)
- College: Tennessee
- NFL draft: 2013: undrafted

Career history
- New York Jets (2013)*
- * Offseason or practice squad member only
- Stats at Pro Football Reference

Zachary Knight Rogers (born November 22, 1990) is an American former professional football wide receiver. He was signed by the New York Jets of the National Football League (NFL) as an undrafted free agent in 2013. He played college football for the Tennessee Volunteers.

== Early life ==
Rogers attended Lipscomb Academy in Nashville, Tennessee. He was selected to the Knoxville News-Sentinel's Top 20 Prospects in Tennessee list following his 2008 season in high school. He was selected twice to the All-State by Tennessee Football Coaches and Tennessee Sports Writers associations. He was selected as the Region 5-3A Player of the Year. He earned Middle Tennessee's National Football Foundation Scholar Athlete Award as senior in high school. He was selected to the first-team All-Region in junior season while helping his David Lipscomb High school football team to the Class 3A state championship. While at high school, he set school track and field records in six events. He was considered a three-star recruit by Rivals.com.

== College career ==
Rogers attended and played college football at the University of Tennessee. In the 2009 season, he recorded three receptions and 19 yards as a freshman. As a sophomore, he recorded 14 receptions for 207 yards and a touchdown in 11 games. His receiving touchdown was a 72-yard reception in a victory over UAB. As a junior, he had 14 receptions for 189 yards and a touchdown in ten games. His one touchdown came against Cincinnati. In his senior season, he had six receptions for 107 yards and three touchdowns in a loss to South Carolina. In his final season at Tennessee, Rogers had 32 receptions for 491 yards and seven touchdowns in ten games.

== Professional career ==
On April 27, 2013, Rogers signed with the New York Jets as an undrafted free agent following the 2013 NFL draft. He was released on August 31, 2013.
