= 2012 Atlantic Coast Conference football season =

2012 ACC football season
- League: NCAA Division I FBS (Football Bowl Subdivision)
- Sport: Football
- Duration: August 31, 2012 – December 1, 2012
- Teams: 12

Regular season
- Season MVP: TBA
- Atlantic champions: Florida State
- Coastal champions: Georgia Tech, UNC, Miami

ACC Championship Game
- Champions: Florida State
- Runners-up: Georgia Tech

ACC seasons
- ← 2011 2013 →

2012 Atlantic Coast Conference football standings
	Conf.			Overall
Team	W		L	W		L
Atlantic Division
No. 10 Florida State xy$	7	–	1	12	–	2
No. 11 Clemson x	7	–	1	11	–	2
NC State	4	–	4	7	–	6
Wake Forest	3	–	5	5	–	7
Maryland	2	–	6	4	–	8
Boston College	1	–	7	2	–	10
Coastal Division
Georgia Tech xy	5	–	3	7	–	7
North Carolina†	5	–	3	8	–	4
Miami (FL)‡	5	–	3	7	–	5
Virginia Tech	4	–	4	7	–	6
Duke	3	–	5	6	–	7
Virginia	2	–	6	4	–	8
Championship: Florida State 21, Georgia Tech 15
$ – BCS representative as conference champion; x – Division champion/co-champions; y – Championship game participant; † North Carolina ineligible for ACC title, championship game, and bowl game due to NCAA sanctions. ‡ Miami ineligible for ACC title, championship game, and bowl game due to self-imposed sanctions.; Rankings from AP Poll

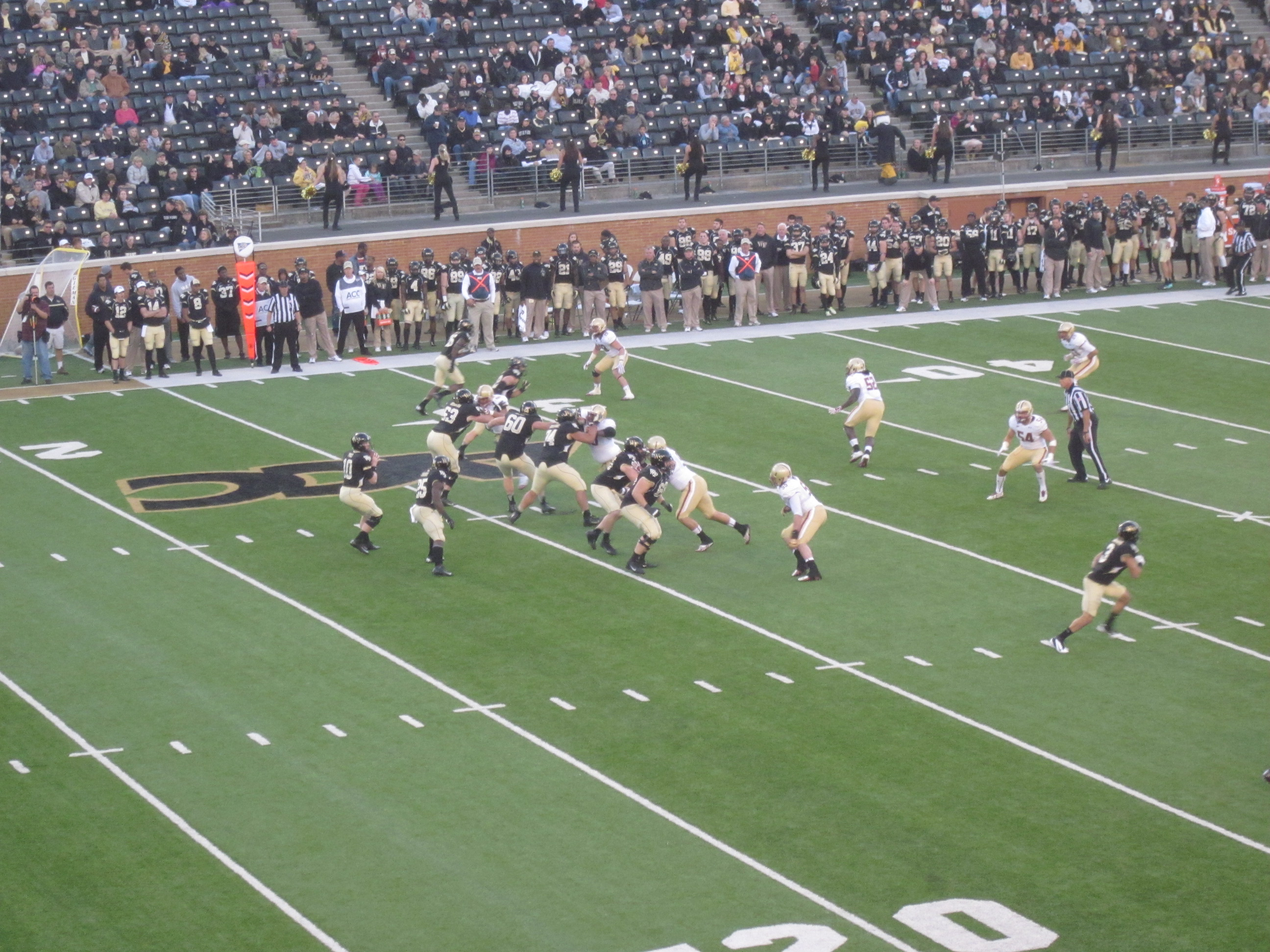
Boston College (in white) on defense versus Wake Forest (in black) during the November 3, 2012 game

The 2012 ACC football season was an NCAA football season that was played from September 1, 2012, to January 1, 2013. At the time, the Atlantic Coast Conference consisted of 12 members in two divisions. The Atlantic division consists of Boston College, Clemson, Florida State, Maryland, North Carolina State and Wake Forest. The Coastal division consists of Duke, Georgia Tech, Miami, North Carolina, Virginia, and Virginia Tech. The division champions met on December 1 in the 2012 ACC Championship Game, at Bank of America Stadium in Charlotte, North Carolina. This season also marked the 60th football season in the conference's history.

== Preseason ==
=== Preseason Poll ===
The 2012 ACC Preseason Poll was announced at the ACC Football Kickoff meetings in Greensboro, NC on July 23. Virginia Tech was voted to win Coastal division while Florida State was voted to win the Atlantic division and the conference. Sammy Watkins of Clemson was voted the Preseason ACC Player of the Year.

==== Atlantic Division poll ====
1. Florida State – 543 (72 first place votes)
2. Clemson – 470 (17)
3. North Carolina State – 402 (5)
4. Wake Forest – 241
5. Boston College – 181
6. Maryland – 148

==== Coastal Division poll ====
1. Virginia Tech – 558 (83)
2. Georgia Tech – 421 (10)
3. North Carolina – 341 (2)
4. Virginia – 326
5. Miami – 245
6. Duke – 04

==== Predicted ACC Championship Game Winner ====
1. Florida State–60
2. Virginia Tech–18
3. Clemson–13
4. Georgia Tech–3
5. NC State-1

==== Preseason ACC Player of the Year ====
1. Sammy Watkins, CLEM - 25
2. Logan Thomas, VT - 21
3. E. J. Manuel, FSU - 19
4. Tajh Boyd, CLEM - 18
5. Mike Glennon, NCSU - 5
6. David Amerson, NCSU - 3
7. Giovani Bernard, UNC - 1
8. Bryn Renner, UNC - 1
9. Tanner Price, WF - 1
10. Kyle Fuller, VT - 1

=== Preseason All Conference Teams ===
==== Offense ====
Position	Player	School
Wide receiver	Conner Vernon	Duke
Wide receiver	Sammy Watkins	Clemson
Tight end	Matt Furstenburg	Maryland
Tackle	James Hurst	North Carolina
Tackle	Oday Aboushi	Virginia
Guard	Omoregie Uzzi	Georgia Tech
Guard	Jonathan Cooper	North Carolina
Center	Dalton Freeman	Clemson
Quarterback	Tajh Boyd	Clemson
Running back	Giovani Bernard	North Carolina
Running back	Andre Ellington	Clemson

==== Defense ====
Position	Player	School
Defensive end	Brandon Jenkins	Florida State
Defensive end	James Gayle	Virginia Tech
Defensive tackle	Joe Vellano	Maryland
Defensive tackle	Nikita Whitlock	Wake Forest
Linebacker	Kevin Reddick	North Carolina
Linebacker	Bruce Taylor	Virginia Tech
Linebacker	Steve Greer	Virginia
Cornerback	David Amerson	NC State
Cornerback	Kyle Fuller	Virginia Tech
Safety	Lamarcus Joyner	Florida State
Safety	Earl Wolff	NC State

==== Specialist ====
Position	Player	School
Placekicker	Dustin Hopkins	Florida State
Punter	Dalton Botts	Miami
Specialist	Greg Reid	Florida State

=== Preseason Watch list ===
Player	School	Award
Chris Pantale	Boston Collage	John Mackey Award
Kevin Pierre-Louis	Boston Collage	Bronko Nagurski Trophy
Brandon Jenkins	Florida State	Bronko Nagurski Trophy
Lamarcus Joyner	Florida State	Bronko Nagurski Trophy
Xavier Rhodes	Florida State	Bronko Nagurski Trophy
Bjoern Werner	Florida State	Bronko Nagurski Trophy
Alex Amidon	Boston Collage	Biletnikoff Award
Willie Haulstead	Florida State	Biletnikoff Award
EJ Manuel	Florida State	Maxwell Award
EJ Manuel	Florida State	Johnny Unitas Golden Arm Award
Brandon Jenkins	Florida State	Bednarik Award
Lamarcus Joyner	Florida State	Bednarik Award
Xavier Rhodes	Florida State	Bednarik Award
Dustin Hopkins	Florida State	Lou Groza Award
Brandon Jenkins	Florida State	Outland Trophy
Lamarcus Joyner	Florida State	Outland Trophy
Xavier Rhodes	Florida State	Outland Trophy
Björn Werner	Florida State	Outland Trophy
Lamarcus Joyner	Florida State	Jim Thorpe Award
Xavier Rhodes	Florida State	Jim Thorpe Award
Brandon Jenkins	Florida State	Lombardi Award
Bjoern Werner	Florida State	Rotary Lombardi Award
Bjoern Werner	Florida State	Butkus Award
Nick Moody	Florida State	Butkus Award
E.J. Manuel	Florida State	Davey O'Brien Award
Brandon Jenkins	Florida State	Walter Camp Award

== Coaches ==
NOTE: Stats shown are before the beginning of the season

Team	Head coach	Years at school	Overall record	Record at school	ACC record
Boston College	Frank Spaziani	5	20–19	20–19	12–12
Clemson	Dabo Swinney	5	29–19	29–19	19–10
Duke	David Cutcliffe	5	59–62	15–33	6–26
Florida State	Jimbo Fisher	3	19–8	19–8	11–5
Georgia Tech	Paul Johnson	5	141–58	34–19	21–11
Maryland	Randy Edsall	2	76–80	2–10	1–7
Miami	Al Golden	2	33–40	6–6	3–5
North Carolina	Larry Fedora	1	34-19	0-0	0-0
NC State	Tom O'Brien	6	108–75	33–30	18–22
Virginia	Mike London	3	36–18	12–13	6–10
Virginia Tech	Frank Beamer	26	250–121–4	208–98–2	53–11
Wake Forest	Jim Grobe	11	101–100–1	68–67	38–51

=== Pre-season Coaches changes ===
Former Ohio State Offensive Coordinator, Jim Bollman, was hired as Boston College offensive line coach/running game coordinator. Sean Desai was hired from Miami as Boston College new Running backs coach/Special teams coordinator, Columbia's wide receivers coach Aaron Smith took the same position at Boston College.

== Rankings ==
Legend
	Improvement in ranking
	Drop in ranking
	Not ranked previous week
RV	Received votes but were not ranked in Top 25 of poll

		Pre	Wk 1	Wk 2	Wk 3	Wk 4	Wk 5	Wk 6	Wk 7	Wk 8	Wk 9	Wk 10	Wk 11	Wk 12	Wk 13	Wk 14	Final
Boston College	AP																
Boston College	C																
Boston College	BCS	Not released															
Clemson	AP	14	12	11	10	17	15	16	14	14	10	10	11	12	15	14	11
Clemson	C	14	12	11	9	16	15	13	13	13	9	8	9	9	14	13	9
Clemson	BCS	Not released							19	18	13	13	11	11	14	14	
Duke	AP							RV									
Duke	C							RV		RV							
Duke	BCS	Not released															
Florida State	AP	7	6	5	4	4	3	12	12	11	9	8	10	10	13	13	10
Florida State	C	7	6	6	4	4	4	11	10	10	7	6	6	5	12	12	8
Florida State	BCS	Not released							14	12	9	10	10	10	13	12	
Georgia Tech	AP	RV	RV	RV	RV												
Georgia Tech	C	RV	RV	RV	RV												
Georgia Tech	BCS	Not released															
Maryland	AP																
Maryland	C																
Maryland	BCS	Not released															
Miami	AP					RV	RV										
Miami	C					RV	RV										
Miami	BCS	Not released															
North Carolina	AP	RV	RV	RV					RV						RV	RV	
North Carolina	C	Ineligible for ranking															
North Carolina	BCS	Not released							Ineligible for ranking								
NC State	AP	RV						RV	RV	RV							
NC State	C	RV						RV									
NC State	BCS	Not released															
Virginia	AP																
Virginia	C	RV	RV	RV													
Virginia	BCS	Not released															
Virginia Tech	AP	16	15	13	RV	RV											
Virginia Tech	C	20	18	13	RV	25	RV										
Virginia Tech	BCS	Not released															
Wake Forest	AP																
Wake Forest	C		RV	RV													
Wake Forest	BCS	Not released															

== Schedule ==
Index to colors and formatting
ACC member won
ACC member lost
ACC teams in **bold**

=== Week One ===
Date	Time	Visiting team	Home team	Site	TV	Result	Attendance	Ref.
August 31	7:30 pm	Tennessee	**NC State**	Georgia Dome • Atlanta, Georgia (Chick-fil-A Kickoff Game)	ESPNU	**L** TENN 35-21	55,529	
September 1	12:30 pm	Elon	**North Carolina**	Kenan Memorial Stadium • Chapel Hill, NC	ACCN	**W** NC 62-0	50,500	
September 1	3:00 pm	William & Mary	**Maryland**	Byrd Stadium • College Park, MD	ESPN3	**W** MD 7-6	31,321	
September 1	3:00 pm	Richmond	**Virginia**	Scott Stadium • Charlottesville, VA	ESPN3	**W** VA 43-19	50,081	
September 1	3:30 pm	**Miami**	**Boston College**	Alumni Stadium • Chestnut Hill, MA	ABC/ESPN2	MIAMI 41-32	39,262	
September 1	5:00 pm	Murray State	No. 7 **Florida State**	Doak Campbell Stadium • Tallahassee, FL	ESPN3	**W** FSU 69-3	70,047	
September 1	6:30 pm	Liberty	**Wake Forrest**	BB&T Field • Winston-Salem, NC	ESPN3	**W** WF 20-17	27,652	
September 1	7:00 pm	No. 25 Auburn	No. 14 **Clemson**	Georgia Dome • Atlanta, Georgia (Chick-fil-A Kickoff Game)	ESPN	**W** CLE 26-9	75,211	
September 1	7:00 pm	Florida International	**Duke**	Wallace Wade Stadium • Durham, NC	ESPN	**W** DUKE 46-26	31,117	
September 3	8:00 pm	**Georgia Tech**	No. 16 **Virginia Tech**	Lane Stadium • Blacksburg, VA	ESPN	VT 20-17 ^{OT}	31,117	
^{#}Rankings from AP Poll released prior to game. All times are in Eastern Time.

=== Week Two ===
Date	Time	Visiting team	Home team	Site	TV	Result	Attendance	Ref.
September 8	12:00 pm	**Miami**	No. 21 Kansas State	Bill Snyder Family Football Stadium • Manhattan, KS	FX	**L** KSU 52-13	48,843	
September 8	12:00 pm	**NC State**	Connecticut	Rentschler Field • East Hartford, CT	Big East Network	**W** NCS 10-7	34,202	
September 8	12:00 pm	**Maryland**	Temple	Lincoln Financial Field • Philadelphia, PA	ESPNU	**W** MD 36-27	23,322	
September 8	12:00 pm	Penn State	**Virginia**	Scott Stadium • Charlottesville, VA	ABC	**W** VA 17-16	56,087	
September 8	12:30 pm	Ball State	No. 12 **Clemson**	Memorial Stadium • Clemson, SC	ACCN	**W** CLE 52–27	79,557	
September 8	1:00 pm	Maine	**Boston College**	Alumni Stadium • Chestnut Hill, MA	ESPN3	**W** BC 34-3	30,685	
September 8	1:30 pm	Austin Peay	No. 15 **Virginia Tech**	Lane Stadium • Blacksburg, VA	ESPN3	**W** VT 42-7	65,632	
September 8	3:00 pm	**North Carolina**	**Wake Forest**	BB&T Field • Winston-Salem, NC	RSN	WF 28-27	29,256	
September 8	6:00 p.m.	Savannah State	No. 6 **Florida State**	Doak Campbell Stadium • Tallahassee, FL	ESPN3	**W** FSU 55-0	71,126	
September 8	7:30 p.m.	Presbyterian	**Georgia Tech**	Bobby Dodd Stadium • Atlanta, GA	ESPN3	**W** GT 59-3	41,678	
September 8	10:30 pm	**Duke**	No. 25 Stanford	Stanford Stadium • Stanford, CA	P12N	**L** STAN 50-13	44,016	
^{#}Rankings from AP Poll released prior to game. All times are in Eastern Time.

=== Week Three ===
Date	Time	Visiting team	Home team	Site	TV	Result	Attendance	Ref.
September 15	12:00 pm	**Wake Forest**	No. 5 **Florida State**	Doak Campbell Stadium • Tallahassee, FL	ESPN	FSU 52-0	68,833	
September 15	12:00 pm	No. 13 **Virginia Tech**	Pittsburgh	Heinz Field • Pittsburgh, PA	ESPNU	**L** PITT 35-17	48,032	
September 15	12:00 pm	Bethune-Cookman	**Miami**	Sun Life Stadium • Miami Gardens, FL	ESPN3	**W** MIAMI 38-10	39,435	
September 15	12:30 pm	Connecticut	**Maryland**	Byrd Stadium • College Park, MD	ACNN	**L** UCONN 24-21	35,491	
September 15	3:00 pm	Furman	No. 11 **Clemson**	Memorial Stadium • Clemson, SC	RSN	**W** CLE 41-7	83,574	
September 15	3:30 pm	**North Carolina**	No. 19 Louisville	Papa John's Cardinal Stadium • Louisville, KY	ABC	**L** LOUI 39-34	53,334	
September 15	3:30 pm	**Virginia**	**Georgia Tech**	Bobby Dodd Stadium • Atlanta, GA	ESPNU	GT 56-20	44,225	
September 15	3:30 pm	**Boston College**	Northwestern	Ryan Field • Evanston, IL	BTN	**L** NW 22-13	32,597	
September 15	6:00 pm	South Alabama	**NC State**	Carter–Finley Stadium • Raleigh, NC	ESPN3	**W** NCS 31-7	54,132	
September 15	7:00 pm	North Carolina Central	**Duke**	Wallace Wade Stadium • Durham, NC (Bull City Gridiron Classic)	ESPN3	**W** DUKE 54-17	22,829	
^{#}Rankings from AP Poll released prior to game. All times are in Eastern Time.

=== Week Four ===
Date	Time	Visiting team	Home team	Site	TV	Result	Attendance	Ref.
September 22	12:00 pm	**Maryland**	No. 8 West Virginia	Mountaineer Field • Morgantown, WV (rivalry)	FX	**L** WV 31-21	58,504	
September 22	12:00 pm	**Virginia**	No. 17 TCU	Amon G. Carter Stadium • Fort Worth, TX	ESPN	**L** TCU 27-7	46,330	
September 22	12:00 pm	Bowling Green	**Virginia Tech**	Lane Stadium • Blacksburg, VA	ESPNU	**W** VT 37-0	65,632	
September 22	12:30 pm	Army	**Wake Forest**	BB&T Field • Winston-Salem, NC	ACCN	**W** WF 49-37	30,207	
September 22	3:00 pm	**Miami**	**Georgia Tech**	Bobby Dodd Stadium • Atlanta, GA	ACCN	MIAMI 42-36	50,390	
September 22	3:30 pm	East Carolina	**North Carolina**	Kenan Memorial Stadium • Chapel Hill, NC	ESPNU	**W** NC 27-6	59,500	
September 22	6:00 pm	Memphis	**Duke**	Wallace Wade Stadium • Durham, NC	ESPN3	**W** DUKE 38-14	23,658	
September 22	6:00 pm	The Citadel	**NC State**	Carter–Finley Stadium • Raleigh, NC	ESPN3	**W** NCS 52-14	55,145	
September 22	8:00 pm	No. 10 **Clemson**	No. 4 **Florida State**	Doak Campbell Stadium • Tallahassee, FL (rivalry))	ABC	FSU 49-37	83,231	
^{#}Rankings from AP Poll released prior to game. All times are in Eastern Time.

=== Week Five ===
Date	Time	Visiting team	Home team	Site	TV	Result	Attendance	Ref.
September 29	12:00 pm	Middle Tennessee	**Georgia Tech**	Bobby Dodd Stadium • Atlanta, GA	ACC RSN	**L** MTSU 49-28	39,270	
September 29	12:00 pm	**NC State**	**Miami**	Sun Life Stadium • Miami Gardens, FL	ESPNU	MIAMI 44-37	38,510	
September 29	12:30 pm	**Duke**	**Wake Forest**	BB&T Field • Winston-Salem, NC (Tobacco Road)	ACCN	DUKE 34-27	28,743	
September 29	3:30 pm	No. 17 **Clemson**	**Boston College**	Alumni Stadium • Chestnut Hill, MA (O'Rourke–McFadden Trophy)	ESPN2	CLE 45-31	40,138	
September 29	3:30 pm	Louisiana Tech	**Virginia**	Scott Stadium • Charlottesville, VA	ESPN3	**L** LT 44-38	42,027	
September 29	3:30 pm	**Virginia Tech**	Cincinnati	FedExField • Landover, MD	ESPNU	**L** Cincy 27-24	46,026	
September 29	3:30 pm	Idaho	**North Carolina**	Kenan Memorial Stadium • Chapel Hill, NC	ACCRSN	**W** NC 66-0	32,000	
September 29	6:00 pm	No. 4 **Florida State**	South Florida	Raymond James Stadium • Tampa, FL	ESPN	**W** FSU 30-17	69,383	
^{#}Rankings from AP Poll released prior to game. All times are in Eastern Time.

=== Week Six ===
Date	Time	Visiting team	Home team	Site	TV	Result	Attendance	Ref.
October 6	12:00 p.m.	**Boston College**	Army	Michie Stadium • West Point, NY	CBSSN	**L** Army 34-31	39,492	
October 6	12:30 p.m.	**Virginia Tech**	**North Carolina**	Kenan Memorial Stadium • Chapel Hill, NC	ACCN	NC 48-34	54,000	
October 6	3:00 p.m.	**Virginia**	**Duke**	Wallace Wade Stadium • Durham, NC	ESPN	Duke 42-17	26,856	
October 6	3:30 p.m.	**Georgia Tech**	No. 15 **Clemson**	Memorial Stadium • Clemson, SC (rivalry)	ESPN	CLE 47-31	82,873	
October 6	3:30 p.m.	**Wake Forest**	**Maryland**	Byrd Stadium • College Park, MD	ESPNU	MD 19-14	40,391	
October 6	7:30 p.m.	**Miami**	No. 9 Notre Dame	Soldier Field • Chicago, IL	NBC	**L** ND 41-3	62,871	
October 6	8:00 p.m.	No. 3 **Florida State**	**NC State**	Carter–Finley Stadium • Raleigh, NC	ESPN2	NCST 17-16	54,962	
^{#}Rankings from AP Poll released prior to game. All times are in Eastern Time.

=== Week Seven ===
Date	Time	Visiting team	Home team	Site	TV	Result	Attendance	Ref.
October 13	12:30 pm	**Duke**	**Virginia Tech**	Lane Stadium • Blacksburg, VA	ACCN	VT 41-20	65,632	
October 13	2:30 pm	**North Carolina**	**Miami**	Sun Life Stadium • Miami Gardens, FL	ESPNU	NC 18-14	58,954	
October 13	3:00 pm	**Maryland**	**Virginia**	Scott Stadium • Charlottesville, VA	ACCRSN	MD 27-20	45,556	
October 13	5:30 pm	**Boston College**	No. 12 **Florida State**	Doak Campbell Stadium • Tallahassee, FL	ESPN2	FSU 51-7	81,075	
^{#}Rankings from AP Poll released prior to game. All times are in Eastern Time.

=== Week Eight ===
Date	Time	Visiting team	Home team	Site	TV	Result	Attendance	Ref.
October 20	12:00 pm	**Virginia Tech**	No. 19 **Clemson**	Memorial Stadium • Clemson, SC	ABC/ESPN2	CLE 38-17	83,338	
October 20	12:30 pm	**Wake Forest**	**Virginia**	Scott Stadium • Charlottesville, VA	ACCN	WF 16-10	41,167	
October 20	3:00 pm	**Boston College**	**Georgia Tech**	Bobby Dodd Stadium • Atlanta, GA	ACC RSN	GT 37-17	40,112	
October 20	3:30 pm	**NC State**	**Maryland**	Byrd Stadium • College Park, MD	ESPNU	NCST 20-18	40,217	
October 20	7:00 pm	**North Carolina**	**Duke**	Wallace Wade Stadium • Durham, NC (Victory Bell)	ESPN	Duke 33-30	33,941	
October 20	8:00 pm	No. 14 **Florida State**	**Miami**	Sun Life Stadium • Miami Gardens, FL (rivalry)	ABC	FSU 20-33	73,328	
^{#}Rankings from AP Poll released prior to game. All times are in Eastern Time.

=== Week Nine ===
Date	Time	Visiting team	Home team	Site	TV	Result	Attendance	Ref.
October 25	7:30 pm	No. 16 **Clemson**	**Wake Forrest**	BB&T Field • Winston-Salem, NC	ESPN	CLE 42-13	31,162	
October 27	12:30 pm	**NC State**	**North Carolina**	Kenan Memorial Stadium • Chapel Hill, NC (rivalry)	ACCN	NC 43-35	62,000	
October 27	1:00 pm	**Maryland**	**Boston College**	Alumni Stadium • Chestnut Hill, MA	ESPN3	BC 20-17	33,267	
October 27	3:00 pm	BYU	**Georgia Tech**	Bobby Dodd Stadium • Atlanta, GA	ACC RSN	**L** BYU 41-17	50,103	
October 27	3:30 pm	**Duke**	No. 12 **Florida State**	Doak Campbell Stadium • Tallahassee, FL	ESPNU	FSU 48-7	71,467	
^{#}Rankings from AP Poll released prior to game. All times are in Eastern Time.

=== Week Ten ===
Date	Time	Visiting team	Home team	Site	TV	Result	Attendance	Ref.
November 1	7:30 pm	**Virginia Tech**	**Miami**	Sun Life Stadium • Miami Gardens, FL (rivalry)	ESPN	Miami 30-12	37,219	
November 3	12:30 pm	**Georgia Tech**	**Maryland**	Byrd Stadium • College Park, MD	ACCN	GT 33-13	33,471	
November 3	12:30 pm	**Virginia**	**NC State**	Carter–Finley Stadium • Raleigh, NC	ACCN	VA 33-6	54,812	
November 3	3:30 pm	**Boston College**	**Wake Forest**	BB&T Field • Winston-Salem, NC	RSN	WF 28-14	28,963	
November 3	7:00 pm	No. 13 **Clemson**	**Duke**	Wallace Wade Stadium • Durham, NC	ESPN2	CLE 56-20	31,894	
^{#}Rankings from AP Poll released prior to game. All times are in Eastern Time.

=== Week Eleven ===
Date	Time	Visiting team	Home team	Site	TV	Result	Attendance	Ref.
November 8	7:30 pm	No. 10 **Florida State**	**Virginia Tech**	Lane Stadium • Blacksburg, VA	ESPN	FSU 28-22	65,632	
November 12	12:00 pm	**Miami**	**Virginia**	Scott Stadium • Charlottesville, VA	ABC	VA 41-40	45,870	
November 12	12:30 pm	**Georgia Tech**	**North Carolina**	Kenan Memorial Stadium • Chapel Hill, NC	ACCN	GT 68-50	50,000	
November 12	3:00 pm	**Wake Forest**	**NC State**	Carter–Finley Stadium • Raleigh, NC	ACCRSN	NCST 37-6	52,567	
November 12	3:30 pm	**Maryland**	No. 13 **Clemson**	Memorial Stadium • Clemson, SC	ESPNU	CLE 45-10	78,302	
November 12	8:00 pm	No. 4 Notre Dame	**Boston College**	Alumni Stadium • Chestnut Hill, MA (Holy War)	ABC	**L** ND 21-6	44,500	
^{#}Rankings from AP Poll released prior to game. All times are in Eastern Time.

=== Week Twelve ===
Date	Time	Visiting team	Home team	Site	TV	Result	Attendance	Ref.
November 15	7:30 pm	**North Carolina**	**Virginia**	Scott Stadium • Charlottesville, VA (The South's Oldest Rivalry)	ESPN	NC 37-13	45,760	
November 17	12:00 pm	No. 10 **Florida State**	**Maryland**	Byrd Stadium • College Park, MD	ESPNU	FSU 41-14	35,244	
November 17	12:30 pm	**Virginia Tech**	**Boston College**	Alumni Stadium • Chestnut Hill, MA (rivalry)	ACCN	VT 30-23 ^{OT}	34,266	
November 17	3:00 pm	South Florida	**Miami**	Sun Life Stadium • Miami Gardens, FL (rivalry)	RSN	**W** Miami 40-9	38,869	
November 17	3:30 pm	**Wake Forest**	No. 3 **Notre Dame**	Notre Dame Stadium • Notre Dame, IN	NBC	**L** ND 38-0	80,795	
November 17	3:30 pm	**NC State**	No. 11 **Clemson**	Memorial Stadium • Clemson, SC (Textile Bowl)	ABC/ESPN2	CLE 62-48	77,831	
November 17	3:30 pm	**Duke**	**Georgia Tech**	Bobby Dodd Stadium • Atlanta, GA	ESPNU	GT 42-24	41,904	
^{#}Rankings from AP Poll released prior to game. All times are in Eastern Time.

=== Week Thirteen ===
Date	Time	Visiting team	Home team	Site	TV	Result	Attendance	Ref.
November 24	12:00 pm	**Georgia Tech**	No. 3 Georgia	Sanford Stadium • Athens, GA (Clean, Old-Fashioned Hate)	ESPN	**L** GA 42-10	92,746	
November 24	12:00 pm	**Virginia**	**Virginia Tech**	Lane Stadium • Blacksburg, VA (Commonwealth Cup)	ESPNU	VT 17-14	65,632	
November 24	12:30 pm	**Miami**	**Duke**	Wallace Wade Stadium • Durham, NC	ACCN	Miami 52-45	26,895	
November 24	3:00 pm	**Boston College**	**NC State**	Carter–Finley Stadium • Raleigh, NC	ESPN3	NCST 27-10	53,020	
November 24	3:00 pm	**Maryland**	**North Carolina**	Kenan Memorial Stadium • Chapel Hill, NC	ACCRSN	NC 45-38	44,000	
November 24	3:30 pm	No. 4 Florida	No. 10 **Florida State**	Doak Campbell Stadium • Tallahassee, FL (rivalry)	ABC	**L** FL 37-26	83,429	
November 24	3:30 pm	Vanderbilt	**Wake Forest**	BB&T Field • Winston-Salem, NC	ESPNU	**L** Vandy 55-21	26,134	
November 24	7:00 pm	No. 12 South Carolina	No. 11 **Clemson**	Memorial Stadium • Clemson, SC (Palmetto Bowl)	ESPN	**L** SCAR 27-17	84,513	
^{#}Rankings from AP Poll released prior to game. All times are in Eastern Time.

=== Championship Week ===
Date	Time	Visiting team	Home team	Site	TV	Result	Attendance	Ref.
December 1	7:45 pm	**Georgia Tech**	**Florida State**	Bank of America Stadium • Charlotte, NC (ACC Championship)	ESPN	FSU 21-15	64,778	
^{#}Rankings from AP Poll released prior to game. All times are in Eastern Time.

== Bowl Games ==
Bowl Game	Date	Stadium	City	Television	Matchup/Result	Attendance	Payout (US$) per team
BCS
Discover Orange Bowl	January 1, 2013	Sun Life Stadium	Miami Gardens, FL	ESPN	Florida State 31, Northern Illinois 10	72,073	
Non-BCS
Belk Bowl	December 26, 2012	Bank of America Stadium	Charlotte, NC	ESPN	Duke 34, Cincinnati 48	48,128	
Russell Athletic Bowl	December 28, 2012	Florida Citrus Bowl Stadium	Orlando, FL	ESPN	Virginia Tech 13, Rutgers 10	48,127	
Franklin American Mortgage Music City Bowl	December 31, 2012	LP Field	Nashville, TN	ESPN	NC State 24, Vanderbilt 38	55,801	
Hyundai Sun Bowl	December 31, 2012	Sun Bowl Stadium	El Paso, TX	CBS	Georgia Tech 21, USC 7	47,922	
Chick-fil-A Bowl	December 31, 2012	Georgia Dome	Atlanta, GA	ESPN	Clemson 25, LSU 24	68,027	

== Weekly awards ==
Following each week of games, Atlantic Coast Conference officials select the players of the week from the conference's teams.

Week	Offensive Back of the Week			Receiver of the Week			Defensive Lineman of the Week			Linebacker of the Week			Defensive Back of the Week			Specialist of the Week		
Week	Player (s)	Position (s)	Team (s)	Player (s)	Position (s)	Team (s)	Player (s)	Position (s)	Team (s)	Player (s)	Position (s)	Team (s)	Player (s)	Position (s)	Team (s)	Player (s)	Position (s)	Team (s)
1							Bjoern Werner	DE	Florida State									
3	Chris Thompson	RB	Florida State				Cornellius Carradine	DE	Florida State	Nick Clancy	ILB	Boston College						
5				Alex Amidon	WR	Boston College												
7	EJ Manuel	QB	Florida State															
8										Telvin Smith	LB	Florida State						
9										Christian Jones	OLB	Florida State	Ronald Darby	CB	Florida State			
11				Rashad Greene	WR	Florida State	Cornellius Carradine	DE	Florida State									
12										Nick Clancy	ILB	Boston College						
13							Bjoern Werner	DE	Florida State							Dustin Hopkins	K	Florida State

== Postseason awards ==
=== All-conference teams ===
==== First Team ====
Offense

Position	Player	School
Quarterback	Tajh Boyd	Clemson
Running back	Giovani Bernard	North Carolina
Running back	Andre Ellington	Clemson
Wide receiver	DeAndre Hopkins	Clemson
Wide receiver	Alex Amidon	Boston College
Tight end	Brandon Ford	Clemson
Tackle	Oday Aboushi	Virginia
Tackle	Brandon Thomas	Clemson
Guard	Jonathan Cooper	North Carolina
Guard	Omoregie Uzzi	Georgia Tech
Center	Dalton Freeman	Clemson
Placekicker	Dustin Hopkins	Florida State
Specialist	Giovani Bernard	North Carolina

Defense

Position	Player	School
Defensive end	Bjoern Werner	Florida State
Defensive end	Cornellius Carradine	Florida State
Defensive tackle	Joe Vellano	Maryland
Defensive tackle	Sylvester Williams	North Carolina
Linebacker	Nick Clancy	Boston College
Linebacker	Kevin Reddick	North Carolina
Linebacker	Steve Greer	Virginia
Cornerback	Xavier Rhodes	Florida State
Cornerback	Ross Cockrell	Duke
Safety	Lamarcus Joyner	Florida State
Safety	Earl Wolff	NC State
Punter	Will Monday	Duke

==== Second Team ====
Offense

Position	Player	School
Quarterback	EJ Manuel	Florida State
Running back	Duke Johnson	Miami
Running back	Chris Thompson	Florida State
Wide receiver	Conner Vernon	Duke
Wide receiver	Michael Campanaro	Wake Forest
Tight end	Eric Ebron	North Carolina
Tackle	James Hurst	North Carolina
Tackle	Cameron Erving	Florida State
Tackle	Emmett Cleary	Boston College
Guard	Tre' Jackson	Florida State
Guard	R.J. Matttes	NC State
Center	Bryan Stork	Florida State
Placekicker	Chandler Catanzaro	Clemson
Placekicker	Casey Barth	North Carolina
Specialist	Duke Johnson	Miami

Defense

Position	Player	School
Defensive end	James Gayle	Virginia Tech
Defensive end	Kareem Martin	North Carolina
Defensive tackle	Everett Dawkins	Florida State
Defensive tackle	Nikita Whitlock	Wake Forest
Linebacker	Demetrius Hartsfield	Maryland
Linebacker	Christian Jones	Florida State
Linebacker	Jack Tyler	Virginia Tech
Cornerback	David Amerson	NC State
Cornerback	Antone Exum	Virginia Tech
Safety	Rashard Hall	Clemson
Safety	Walt Canty	Duke
Punter	Tommy Hibbard	North Carolina

=== Conferences awards ===
- Defensive Player of the Year: Bjoern Werner, FSU
- Defensive Rookie of the Year: Ronald Darby. FSU

== Players going pro ==
Name	Position	School	Pro Team	Acquired
EJ Manuel	QB	Florida State	Buffalo Bills	1R 16P
Björn Werner	DE	Florida State	Indianapolis Colts	1R 24P
Xavier Rhodes	CB	Florida State	Minnesota Vikings	1R 25P
Cornelius Carradine	DE	Florida State	San Francisco 49ers	2R 8P
Menelik Watson	OT	Florida State	Oakland Raiders	2R 10P
Chris Thompson	RB	Florida State	Washington Redskins	5R 21P
Brandon Jenkins	LB	Florida State	Washington Redskins	5R 29P
Dustin Hopkins	K	Florida State	Buffalo Bills	6R 9P
Nick Moody	LB	Florida State	San Francisco 49ers	6R 12P
Vince Williams	LB	Florida State	Pittsburgh Steelers	6R 38P
Everett Dawkins	DT	Florida State	Minnesota Vikings	7R 23P
Nick Clancy	LB	Boston College	Atlanta Falcons	Undrafted free agent
Emmett Cleary	OT	Boston College	Indianapolis Colts	Undrafted free agent
Jim Noel	DB	Boston College	Seattle Seahawks	Undrafted free agent
Chris Pantale	TE	Boston College	New York Jets	Undrafted free agent
John Wetzel	OT	Boston College	Oakland Raiders	Undrafted free agent
Lonnie Pryor	FB	Florida State	Jacksonville Jaguars	Undrafted free agent
Rodney Smith	WR	Florida State	Minnesota Vikings	Undrafted free agent
Anthony McCloud	DT	Florida State	Minnesota Vikings	Undrafted free agent
