= Emmett Cleary =

American football player (born 1990)

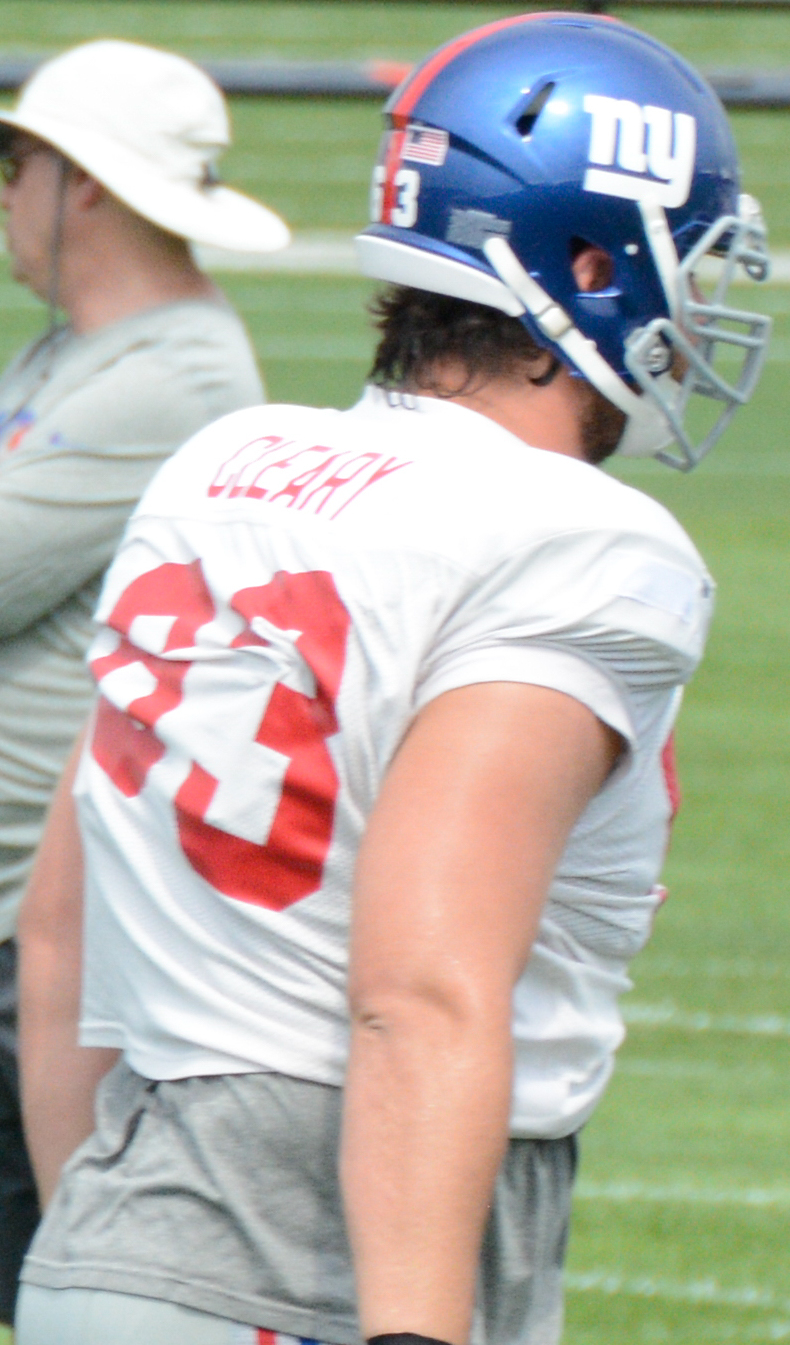
- Cleary with the New York Giants in 2016

No. 63, 77
- Position: Offensive tackle

Personal information
- Born: April 27, 1990 (age 36); Tokyo, Japan
- Listed height: 6 ft 7 in (2.01 m)
- Listed weight: 320 lb (145 kg)

Career information
- High school: St. Viator (Arlington Heights, Illinois, U.S.)
- College: Boston College
- NFL draft: 2013: undrafted

Career history
- Indianapolis Colts (2013)*; Tampa Bay Buccaneers (2013)*; Oakland Raiders (2014)*; Cincinnati Bengals (2014)*; New York Giants (2015); Dallas Cowboys (2016); Detroit Lions (2017)
- * Offseason or practice squad member only

Awards and highlights
- Nils V. "Swede" Nelson Award (2012); Second-team All-ACC (2012)

Career NFL statistics
- Games played: 20
- Games started: 2
- Stats at Pro Football Reference

Emmett Joseph Cleary (born April 27, 1990) is an American former professional football player who was an offensive tackle in the National Football League (NFL). He played college football for the Boston College Eagles, and signed with the Indianapolis Colts as an undrafted free agent in 2013. He was also a member of the Tampa Bay Buccaneers, Oakland Raiders, Cincinnati Bengals, New York Giants, Dallas Cowboys, and Detroit Lions.

== Early life ==
Cleary was born in Tokyo, Japan, but moved to the United States where he first learned football. He graduated from St. Viator High School.

As a senior, he was a two-way player at offensive tackle and defensive end. He received honorable-mention All-state, two-time All-East Suburban Catholic Conference, Daily Herald Northwest Suburban All-Area and ESCC Co-Offensive Lineman of the Year honors. He was named an Illinois State Scholar and a National Merit finalist.

== College career ==
Cleary accepted a football scholarship from Boston College. As a redshirt freshman, he was a backup at offensive tackle and appeared in 12 games.

As a sophomore, he began the season as a backup until starter Rich Lapham was injured, which contributed to establishing himself the starter at right tackle for the last five games.

As a junior, he started all 12 games at right tackle. As a senior, he switched sides with John Wetzel and was named the starter at left tackle.

== Professional career - Football ==
=== Indianapolis Colts ===
Cleary was signed as an undrafted free agent by the Indianapolis Colts after the 2013 NFL draft on April 30. After competing for a roster spot during training camp, he was waived/injured (undisclosed) on September 5.

=== Tampa Bay Buccaneers ===
On October 16, 2013, Cleary was signed by the Tampa Bay Buccaneers to their practice squad. He signed a reserve/future contract on January 6, 2014. He was released on June 17.

=== Oakland Raiders ===
On June 18, 2014, he was claimed off waivers by the Oakland Raiders. He was released on August 24.

=== Cincinnati Bengals ===
On September 16, 2014, he was added to the Cincinnati Bengals practice squad.

=== New York Giants ===
On January 13, 2015, Cleary signed a reserve/future contract with the New York Giants. He was waived on September 5. On September 6, he was signed to the Giants' practice squad. On November 16, he was elevated to the active roster. On September 6, 2016, he was waived/injured (finger).

=== Dallas Cowboys ===
On September 28, 2016, Cleary was signed by the Dallas Cowboys to be the reserve swing tackle and replace an injured Chaz Green. He played only on special teams until Week 16 against the Detroit Lions, where he replaced an injured Tyron Smith at left tackle in the third quarter. He started at left tackle in the season finale against the Philadelphia Eagles in place of an injured Smith.

In 2017, he was passed on the depth chart by Byron Bell during training camp and was waived on September 2.

=== Detroit Lions ===
On September 12, 2017, Cleary was signed by the Detroit Lions.

Cleary announced his retirement from the NFL on April 10, 2018. On May 13, 2018, he announced his plans to attend medical school in fall 2018 at USC.
