= Joe Tessitore =

American sports announcer (born 1971)

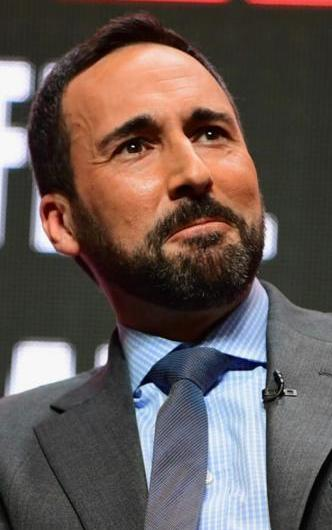
- Tessitore in 2020
- Born: January 1, 1971 (age 55); Schenectady, New York, U.S.
- Education: Christian Brothers Academy
- Alma mater: Boston College (BS)
- Occupation: Sportscaster
- Years active: 1993–present
- Employer(s): ESPN; WWE
- Television: KXAS-TV; WRGB (1994–1995); WFSB (1995–2002); ABC and ESPN (2002–present)
- Spouse: Rebecca Tessitore
- Children: 2

Joseph William Tessitore (born January 1, 1971) is an American sportscaster for ABC, ESPN and WWE. He leads ESPN's world championship fight broadcasts as the play-by-play broadcaster for Top Rank Boxing on ESPN and serves as a play-by-play announcer for Holey Moley on ABC alongside comedian Rob Riggle and NBA star Stephen Curry and announces college football on ESPN and ABC. In 2018 and 2019, Tessitore was also the play-by-play broadcaster of Monday Night Football, alongside former Dallas Cowboys tight end Jason Witten and former Tampa Bay Buccaneers and Indianapolis Colts defensive tackle Booger McFarland. Having been part of WWE since July 2024, he is currently the play-by-play commentator for Raw alongside former in-ring competitor Wade Barrett. He is currently the lead play-by-play announcer for TKO's Zuffa Boxing promotion.

== Education ==
Born and raised in Schenectady, New York, Tessitore completed his college preparatory studies at Christian Brothers Academy in Albany, New York He graduated from the Boston College Carroll School of Management in 1993.

== Early career ==
Tessitore's broadcasting career began at KXAS-TV, an NBC affiliate in the Dallas–Fort Worth metroplex. In 1994, he briefly moved to WRGB (CBS) in Albany, New York before joining WFSB (CBS) in Hartford, Connecticut in 1995. Tessitore took over the primary sports anchor role in 1997.

== ESPN ==
In February 2002, Tessitore began calling boxing on ESPN as part of Tuesday Night Fights and Friday Night Fights. Soon to follow, he was appearing on ESPN College Football and college basketball broadcasts. In addition to his regular duties of football, horse racing and fights Joe has covered a wide array of sporting events for ESPN and is also a featured contributor for ESPN.com. Along with Monday Night Football he was also the lead broadcaster for college basketball's Super Tuesday on ESPN, and the SEC Basketball Tournament, where he was paired with Dick Vitale and Sean Farnham. Tessitore is widely regarded as one of the most versatile broadcasters at the network.

Tessitore spent many years anchoring ABC/ESPN Horse Racing presentations including The Belmont Stakes and The Breeders’ Cup World Championships. In 2008, he was leading the ABC broadcast team when undefeated colt Big Brown failed to win horse racing's Triple Crown. In 2015 he was trackside anchoring Sportscenter's weeklong coverage of American Pharoah's history making win. Tessitore also was ESPN's host/anchor when famed race horse Zenyatta's unbeaten streak was stopped. The champion filly was defeated in the Breeders' Cup Classic.

Tessitore has produced documentaries for ESPN's award-winning 30 for 30 series. In 2011 he was the executive producer of the ESPN Film Roll Tide, War Eagle. In 2012 he was the consulting producer on ESPN's 30 for 30 featuring Bo Jackson.

For five years Tessitore was the host of ESPN's live New Year's Eve specials, including RedBull New Year, No Limits, and the debut of ESPN's Year of the Quarterback.

=== College football ===
Previous to joining Monday Night Football, Tessitore was the lead play-by-play broadcaster for ESPN's Saturday Night College Football Primetime Game and the College Football Playoff. He appeared in the booth alongside veteran broadcaster Todd Blackledge as part of ESPN's coverage of college football. Tessitore and his primetime crew were honored for their work, including being chosen by Sports Illustrated as the 2016 Broadcast Team of the Year.

Previously, Tessitore also served in the play-by-play role for ESPN's Thursday Night Football and was host of SEC Nation paired with Tim Tebow and Paul Finebaum. He also has hosted ESPN's College Football Final, College Football Live, various Sportscenter specials and has long been a fixture on ESPN's presentation of the Heisman Trophy, as he is considered the leading expert on the trophy and its voting history. Tessitore is the host of ESPN's extensive coverage of National Signing Day. He has been the broadcaster of multiple Orange Bowls, the Peach Bowl, and the Sugar Bowl broadcast team. He has worked play-by-play for the BCS Championship on ESPN 3D and is the lead broadcaster for ESPN's Megacast Homers edition of College Football's National Championship Games.

== Honors ==
Tessitore has been honored for his on-air work. Sports Illustrated’s Richard Deitsch has twice named him a finalist for Sports Media Person of the Year. On January 18, 2010, he accepted an Eclipse Award on behalf of his ESPN production team for their Belmont Stakes broadcast on ABC. On June 4, 2010, the Boxing Writers of America presented Tessitore with the prestigious Sam Taub award for Broadcast Excellence. The Connecticut Boxing Hall of Fame included Tessitore in their 2010 class of inductees.

== Outside ESPN ==
Since 2004, Tessitore has been the voice for the top selling Fight Night video game series produced by EA Sports. He also played himself in three national commercials for Dr. Pepper which aired extensively through fall of 2016 and winter of 2017. Tessitore’s distinct voice-over work has been used in several feature films, including Annapolis, The Break-Up, plus numerous television programs. He has also appeared in the television drama The Dead Zone acting as himself in an episode.

In 2017, he became the co-host of ABC's Battle of the Network Stars, a reboot of the Howard Cosell led celebrity classic from the 1970s and 80s.

Starting in 2019, Tessitore became the head play-by-play commentator for ABC’s Holey Moley.

In a 2021 episode of Celebrity Wheel of Fortune aired nationally on ABC, Tessitore competed with fellow Holey Moley cast Rob Riggle and Jeannie Mai, winning $57,350 towards his selected charity of Wide Horizons For Children.

=== WWE ===
On July 9, 2024, WWE announced that Tessitore had signed with the company and would start working as a play-by-play commentator later in the summer. The deal keeps Tessitore employed by ABC and ESPN. As of September 2, 2024, he was the lead announcer for Raw working alongside Wade Barrett. Starting January 10, 2025, Tessitore and Barrett were moved to SmackDown in a company-wide commentary team revamp. They later swapped again back to Raw to accommodate Tessitore's college football schedule. On January 9, 2026, Tessitore and Barrett were once again moved to SmackDown.

== Announcing style ==
In August 2012, he was the subject of an extensive feature story titled, "Tessitore becoming major voice of college football, one upset at a time", written by Stewart Mandel. His call proclaiming "Texas is back, folks!" at the end of a thrilling Longhorns overtime victory over Notre Dame in 2016 became the subject of an Internet meme mocking the Longhorns after the team experienced subsequent struggles.

Not all reviews of Tessitore's announcing, especially on MNF, have been positive. John Teti wrote that "Tessitore is a merchant of schmaltz... Clichés are a given in football announcing, but few commentators imbue NFL banalities with the portentous sentimentality that Tessitore brings to bear." The Guardian wrote that "Tessitore sounds like a condescending try-hard." The unpopularity of Tessitore and Booger McFarland with viewers and critics alike led to their removal from Monday Night Football before the 2020 season.

== Personal life ==
Tessitore is of Italian descent and is a member of the National Italian American Foundation. He is also a member of the Board of Directors for the Connecticut Cystic Fibrosis Foundation, as well as the founder of the annual Sportscasters' SuperBall for CF Research. Tessitore and his wife Rebecca have two children, both of whom have been involved in collegiate sports. His son, John, was formerly a kicker at Boston College while his daughter, Nicolina, played squash for the Virginia Cavaliers.

Preceded by Sean McDonough	Monday Night Football play-by-play announcer 2018–2019	Succeeded by Steve Levy
Preceded by Michael Cole	Raw Lead Announcer; 2024	Succeeded by Michael Cole
Preceded by Michael Cole	SmackDown Lead Announcer; 2025–present	Succeeded by current
