= St. Viator High School =

Saint Viator High School

Location
- 1213 East Oakton Street; Arlington Heights, Illinois; United States; 42.09423°N 87.96944°W

Information
- Type: Private, Coeducational, secondary, parochial
- Religious affiliation: Catholic (Viatorians)
- Established: 1961; 65 years ago
- Founder: Clerics of St. Viator
- Oversight: Archdiocese of Chicago
- President: Ryan Aiello
- Principal: Erika Mickelburgh
- Staff: 128
- Grades: 9–12
- Average class size: 25
- Student to teacher ratio: 13:1
- Campus size: 880 (2024)
- Campus type: suburban
- Colors: Navy Blue and White
- Fight song: Ye Fighting Men of Viator
- Athletics conference: Chicago Catholic League; Girls Catholic Athletic Conference; Metro Catholic Aquatics Conference; Chicago Catholic Hockey League; Scholastic Hockey League
- Mascot: Lion
- Team name: Lions
- Accreditation: AdvancED
- Publication: ROAR (literary magazine)
- Newspaper: Viator Voice
- Yearbook: Viatome
- Tuition: US$16,500
- Website: www.saintviator.com
- School building
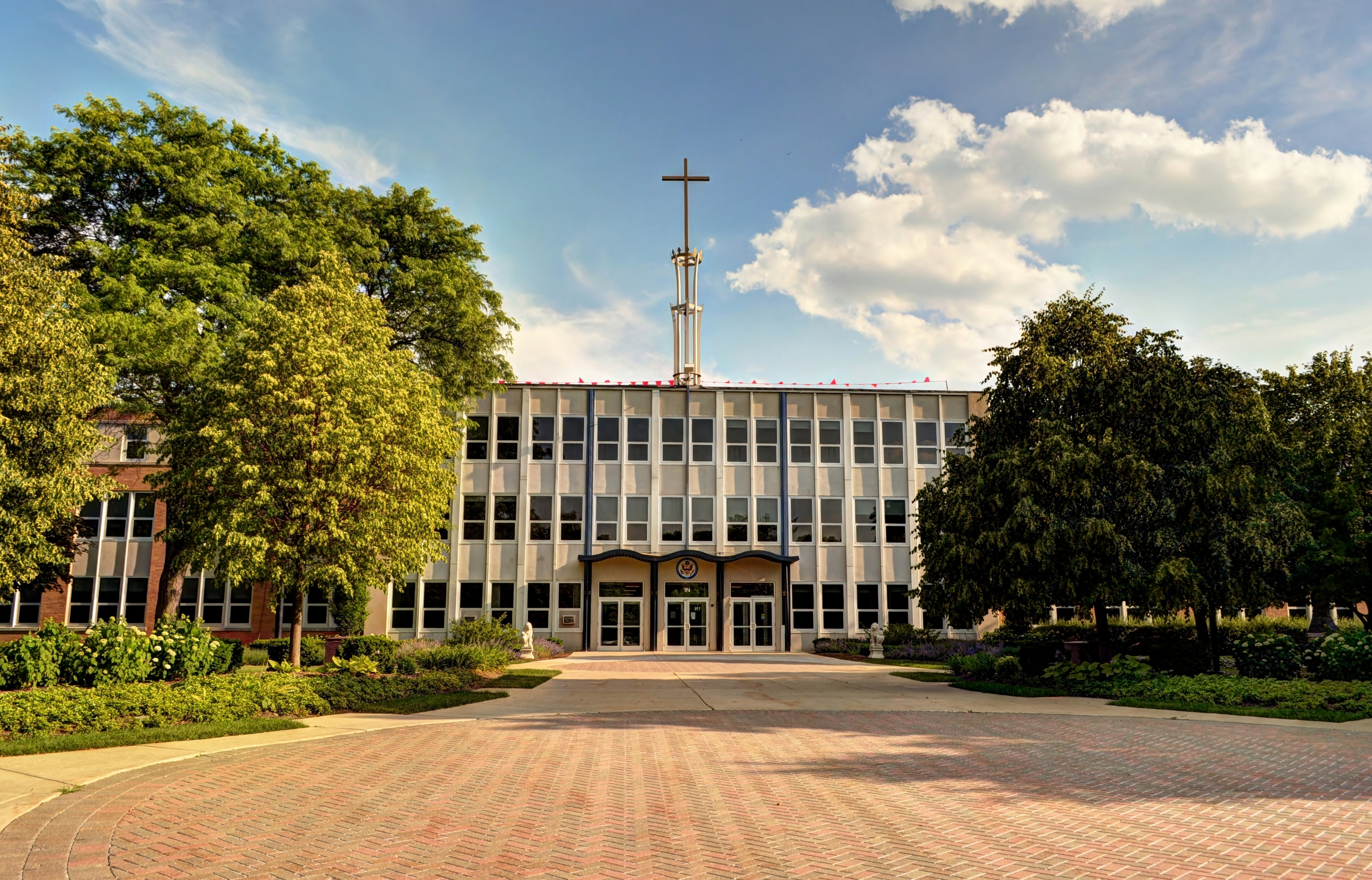

Saint Viator High School is a private Catholic co-educational secondary school run by the Clerics of Saint Viator in Arlington Heights, Illinois, United States. It was founded by Father Louis Querbes and opened in 1961 to serve as a college-preparatory school for students from the northwest suburbs of Chicago, which is part of the Archdiocese of Chicago.

== History ==
The Archdiocese of Chicago reallocated some land it had already owned — tentatively designated for a future cemetery — for educational purposes, and assigned the Clerics of St. Viator to build and run a boys' secondary school. It opened in 1961 to a small class of freshmen and a few sophomores, graduating its first class in 1965.

Enrollments waxed and waned over the next few decades. Faced with declining numbers in 1987, the choice was made to merge with Sacred Heart of Mary High School of Rolling Meadows, with which Saint Viator already had a sister school relationship. The merger occurred in the summer of 1987; Saint Viator absorbed the faculty, staff, and student body of Sacred Heart beginning with the 1987–88 school year, and admitted a co-educational freshman class (the class of 1991).

The physical plant remained largely unchanged from its original 1961 footprint. A co-educational student population required the construction of a girls' locker room. This kicked off a string of renovations to occur throughout the 1990s, including a renovation of the boys' locker room, the chapel, and science labs. After a major capital campaign, the school constructed a multipurpose athletic addition, and the Boler Center was dedicated in summer of 2005. In 2014, the Marie Gallagher Academic Commons was dedicated and in 2015 Fr. Louis Querbes Hall and the new fine arts facilities were dedicated. As of 2022, the school went through a renovation of classrooms. A student gathering area, formerly known as the "fishbowl," has been completely renovated to include a small coffee shop named Burks Place.

== Academics ==
Saint Viator follows a Catholic Environment. Students are required to take classes from a breadth of areas, including math, English, fine arts, science, social science, and religion; a foreign language is required for a minimum of two years. Instruction in the Spanish, French, and Italian languages is offered. As of 2009, German is no longer offered and as of 2024 Mandarin Chinese is no longer offered.

18 Advanced Placement courses are offered in English Language, English Literature, Calculus (AB & BC), Spanish Language and Culture, French Language and Culture, Italian Language and Culture, Biology, Chemistry, Physics (C), Environmental Science, U.S. History, European History, Human Geography, Psychology, Computer Science Principles, Statistics and World History.

The school requires students to complete a fixed number of community service hours in order to graduate. Starting with the class of 2010, students are required to complete 25 community service hours in one year which adds up to 100 service hours for the 4 years.

In 2008, Saint Viator was named a Blue Ribbon School by the United States Department of Education. It was one of only three private high schools in the country to be recognized as blue ribbon schools. Again in 2014, the school was recognized as a blue ribbon school. This time around it was only one of six private high schools in the nation and the only high school in the Archdiocese of Chicago to be recognized. Since 1996, numerous students from Saint Viator have achieved a 36 on the American College Test, the ACT. In 2016-17, nine students were named National Merit Commended Scholars, five were named National Merit Semi-Finalists, and three were named National Merit Finalists.

Saint Viator was subsequently named a Blue Ribbon School in 2024, it was one of only five private high schools in the country to be recognized as a Blue Ribbon School. This marks the third time the school has been recognized as a Blue Ribbon School.

== Extracurricular activities ==
Saint Viator offers various academic and leadership societies, such as National Honor Society, Ambassador's Club, Justice League, Math Club, Science Club, The Justice League, Film Club, Champions Club, Anime Club, Students Against Destructive Decisions (SADD), Yearbook, Viator Voice (newspaper), Recycling Corps, Link Crew, Tech Crew and Student Council; foreign language clubs; DECA, and Scholastic Bowl. There are also many performing ensembles offered: the Winter Musical (established in 1967), the Fall Play, Concert Band, Symphonic Band, Jazz Band, Musical Pit Orchestra, Pep Band, Concert Choir, Treble Choir, Chamber Singers, Music Ministry, Orchesis and Notably Chess Club which was started by Aiden Confeurto.

== Athletics ==
For most sports, Saint Viator plays in the Chicago Catholic League and Girls Catholic Athletic Conference; for swimming and water polo, the Metro Catholic Aquatics Conference. The Saint Viator hockey team plays in both the Chicago Catholic Hockey League and the Scholastic Hockey League. Saint Viator's athletics have had success with some of their athletic teams. Taking top 3 almost every year in their conference. Soccer is one of these teams, being one of few schools with the highest number of state appearances.

The following teams have placed in the top four of their respective sports in state tournaments sponsored by the Illinois High School Association:

- Baseball: State Champions (2016–17); 2nd place (1964–65); 4th place (2015–16)
- Cheerleading (girls): State Champions (2011–12)
- Golf (boys): State Champions (2007–08, 2008–09, 2009–10); 2nd place (2006–07, 2017–18); 3rd place (1983–84);
- Golf (girls): 3rd place (2022–23)
- Lacrosse (boys): 2nd place (2022–23)
- Soccer (boys): State Champions (2003–04, 2009–10); 2nd place (2000–01); 3rd place (1996–97, 1997–98, 2004–05, 2013–14); 4th place (2001–02, 2014–15)
- Soccer (girls): State Champions (2001–02, 2002–03, 2004–05); 2nd place (2009–10, 2017–18).
- Swimming & Diving (boys): 4th place (1973–74)
- Varsity Hockey: 2nd place (1978–1979, 1988–1989, 2011–2012, 2018-2019)
- Volleyball (boys): 4th place (2001–02)
- Volleyball (girls): 4th place (2017–18)
- Water Polo (boys): 4th place (2001–02)
- Track (Girls): 4th place (2021-2022)
- Cross Country (Girls): 5th Place (2025-2026)

== Notable alumni ==
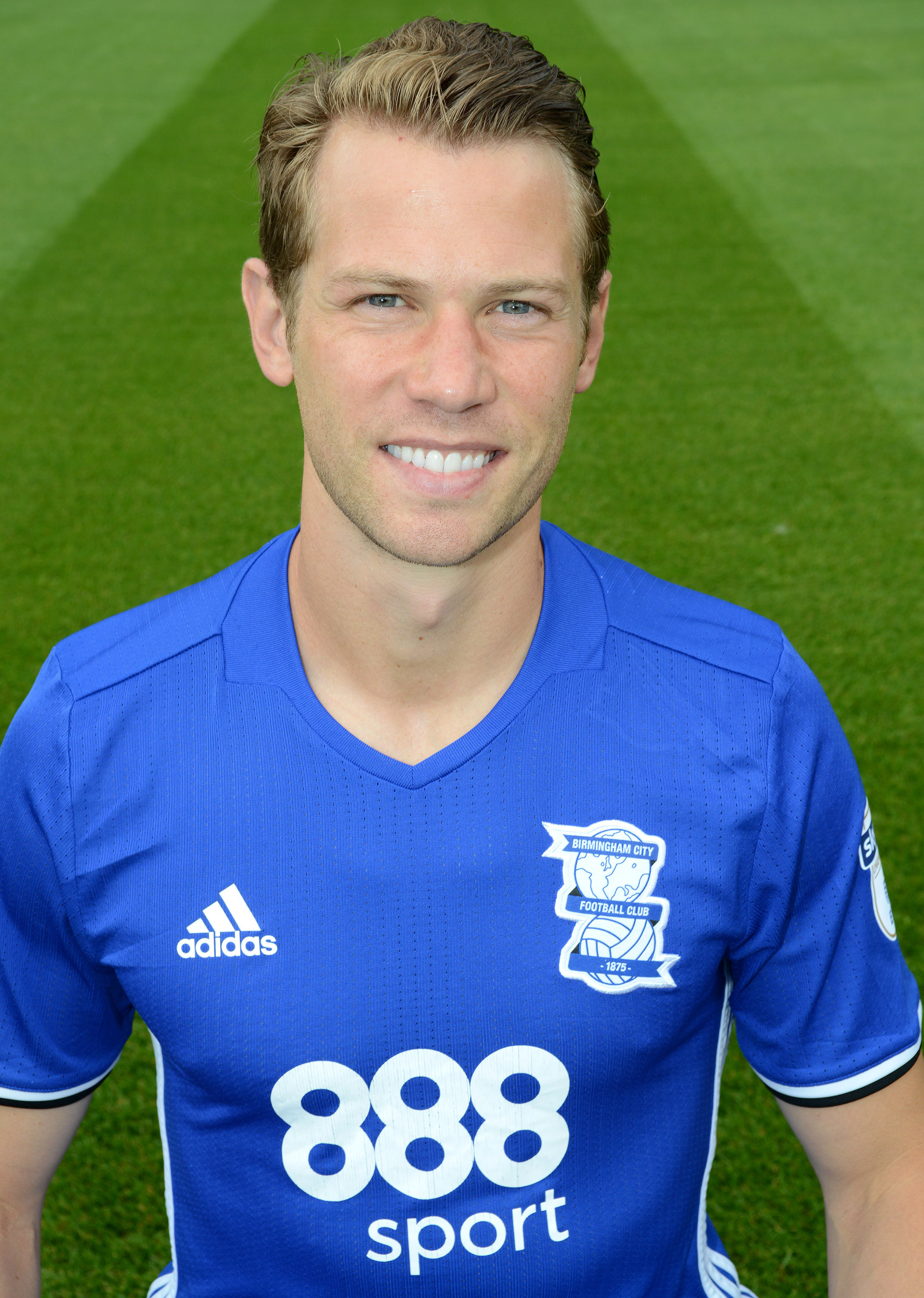
Jonathan Spector

- Brett Basanez (class of 2001), record-breaking quarterback for Northwestern University; formerly of the Carolina Panthers and Chicago Bears
- Emmett Cleary (class of 2008), offensive tackle for NFL's Detroit Lions
- Rob Eiter (class of 1985), 1996 Olympic wrestler
- Mike Guendling (class of 1979), former NFL linebacker
- Cole Kmet (class of 2017), American football player for the Chicago Bears and played collegiately for the Notre Dame Fighting Irish
- Natasha Korecki (class of 1992), Chicago Sun-Times reporter who has covered high-profile criminal trials
- Ted Nugent (class of 1967), guitarist, The Amboy Dukes, Damn Yankees, and solo career; known for conservative and pro-hunting views
- Danny O'Shea (class of 2009), American pair skater, 2026 Olympic Games team event gold medalist
- Jarrett Payton (class of 1999), CFL running back for Montreal Alouettes, media personality and son of Walter Payton
- Jonathan Spector (class of 2004), soccer player, defender for Orlando City SC (Major League Soccer) and U. S. national team
- Brian Stack (class of 1982), performer and writer on Late Night with Conan O'Brien
- Ben Weasel (Benjamin Foster), founding member and lead singer of punk band Screeching Weasel
- Sal Cannella (class of 2015), football player

== Notable staff ==
- Ron Feiereisel, former professional basketball player for the Minneapolis Lakers; coach at DePaul University; the school's first basketball coach
- Robbie Gould, former NFL kicker, football team's head coach, posting a 3-15 record in two seasons before leaving the team in October 2026.
