= Mike Guendling =

American football player (born 1962)

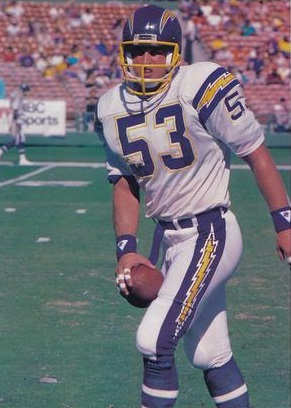
- Guendling c. 1985

No. 53
- Position: Linebacker

Personal information
- Born: June 18, 1962 (age 64); Chicago, Illinois, U.S.
- Listed height: 6 ft 3 in (1.91 m)
- Listed weight: 238 lb (108 kg)

Career information
- High school: St. Viator (IL)
- College: Northwestern
- NFL draft: 1984: 2nd round, 33rd overall pick

Career history
- San Diego Chargers (1984–1985)

Career NFL statistics
- Games played: 9
- Stats at Pro Football Reference

Michael Anthony Guendling (born June 18, 1962) is an American former professional football player who was a linebacker in the National Football League (NFL) for the San Diego Chargers. He played college football for the Northwestern Wildcats.

== Early life ==
Guendling attended St. Viator High School, where he was a three-year starter at linebacker. He also practiced hockey.

He accepted a football scholarship from Northwestern University. He was named a starter at defensive back as a freshman. As a sophomore, he was moved to outside linebacker, to play in a 3-4 defense.

As a junior, he had 20 tackles (13 solo), helping the team beat Michigan State University and end a string off 44 consecutive road loses.

As a senior, he had 7 solo tackles (3 for loss), 2 sacks and 4 pass breakups in a 10-8 win against Indiana University. He finished second in school history with 29 career tackles for loss. He also had 3 career interceptions.

He played two seasons with the school's hockey team.

== Professional career ==
Guendling was selected by the San Diego Chargers in the second round (33rd overall) of the 1984 NFL draft. As a rookie, he was lost for the season after suffering a broken kneecap and knee ligament damage during training camp in July, which forced him to have 3 knee surgeries.

In 1985, he returned to play in 9 games, limited mostly to special teams and had 7 tackles. In 1986, he suffered an ankle injury. He wasn't able to regain his previous form after his knee injury and was waived on August 20.

== Personal life ==
His son Brian played college football at Texas State University.
