= Leander Jordan =

American football player (born 1977)

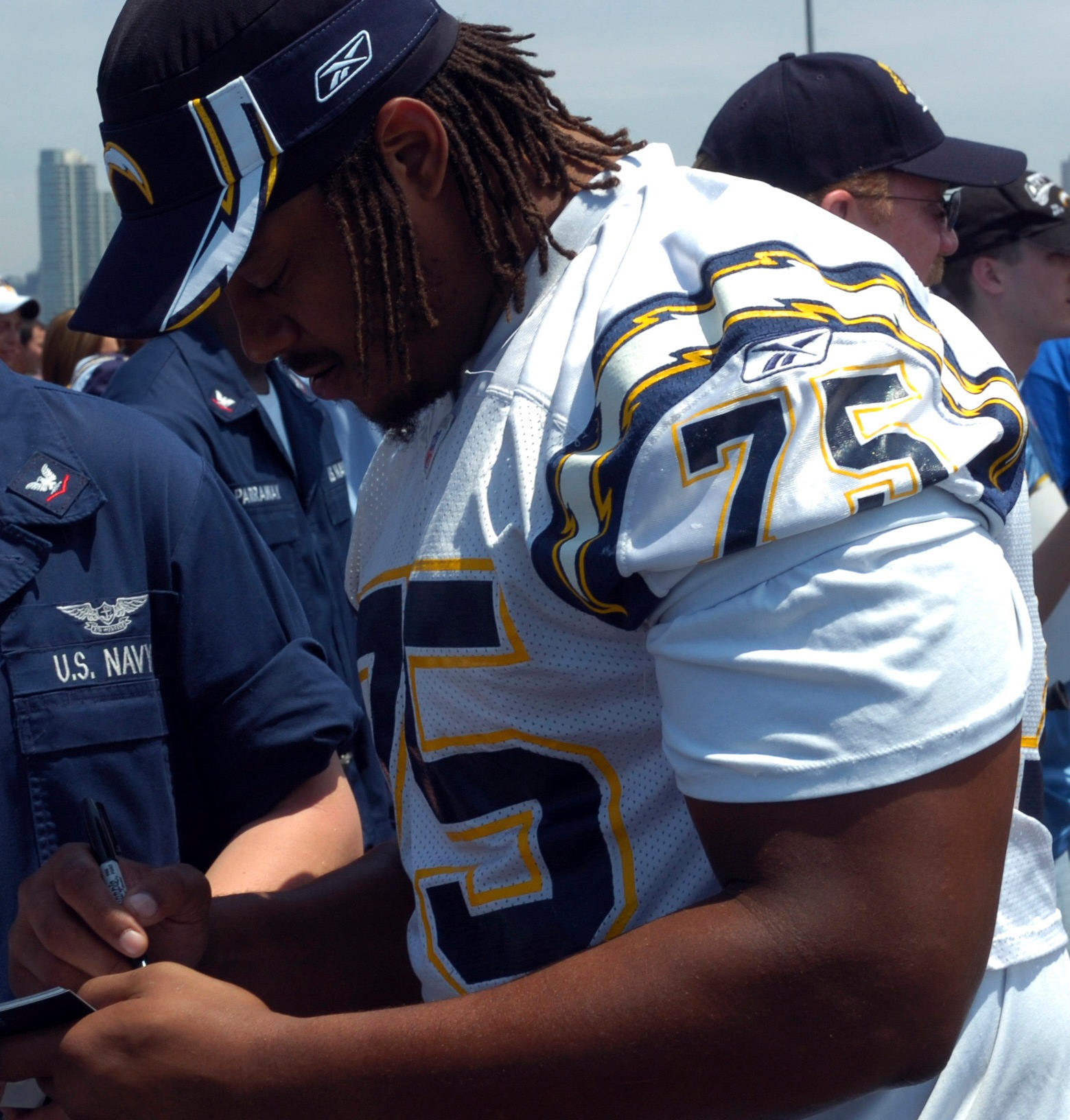
- Jordan signing an autograph in 2006

No. 76, 75
- Position: Offensive tackle

Personal information
- Born: September 15, 1977 (age 49); Pittsburgh, Pennsylvania, U.S.
- Listed height: 6 ft 4 in (1.93 m)
- Listed weight: 320 lb (145 kg)

Career information
- High school: Brashear (Pittsburgh)
- College: IUP (1996–1999)
- NFL draft: 2000: 3rd round, 82nd overall pick

Career history
- Carolina Panthers (2000–2001); Jacksonville Jaguars (2002–2003); San Diego Chargers (2004–2006); Atlanta Falcons (2007)*; Jacksonville Jaguars (2008)*
- * Offseason or practice squad member only

Career NFL statistics
- Games played: 37
- Games started: 14
- Fumble recoveries: 1
- Stats at Pro Football Reference

Leander Jordan (born September 15, 1977) is an American former professional football player who was an offensive tackle in the National Football League (NFL). He was selected 82nd overall by the Carolina Panthers in the third round of the 2000 NFL draft. He played college football for the IUP Crimson Hawks.
