= Solomon Page =

American football player (born 1976)

No. 77, 79
- Position: Guard / Tackle

Personal information
- Born: February 27, 1976 (age 50); Pittsburgh, Pennsylvania, U.S.
- Listed height: 6 ft 4 in (1.93 m)
- Listed weight: 325 lb (147 kg)

Career information
- High school: Brashear (Pittsburgh)
- College: West Virginia
- NFL draft: 1999: 2nd round, 55th overall pick

Career history
- Dallas Cowboys (1999–2002); San Diego Chargers (2003); Detroit Lions (2004)*; New York Giants (2004)*
- * Offseason or practice squad member only

Awards and highlights
- 2× All-Big East (1997, 1998)

Career NFL statistics
- Games played: 67
- Games started: 58
- Stats at Pro Football Reference

Solomon Page (born February 27, 1976) is an American former professional football player who was an offensive lineman in the National Football League (NFL) for the Dallas Cowboys and San Diego Chargers. He played college football for the West Virginia Mountaineers and was selected by the Dallas Cowboys in the second round of the 1999 NFL draft.

== Early life ==
Page was born in Pittsburgh, Pennsylvania, where he played football at Brashear High School and was an All-city selection at defensive tackle. After graduating from high school, he spent a year at Hargrave Military Academy improving his grades.

== College career ==
He accepted a football scholarship from West Virginia University. As a red-shirt freshman, he played offensive lineman, earning the starting left tackle job and grading out at 84% consistency. He blocked for fellow freshman Amos Zereoué, becoming just the 11th freshman since 1980 to earn a spot in the Mountaineer Club for players who grade at least 80 percent.

As a sophomore, he earned All-Big East honors for an offense that amassed 4,602 yards. As a junior, he was an All-Big East selection while grading out at 89% consistency for an offense that generated 5,546 total yards. He declared after the season for the NFL draft.

During his career at West Virginia, Page helped to anchor an offensive line that helped the offense produced at least 300 yards in each of his final 21 career games. He contributed to All-American running back Zereoué becoming the school and Big East's all-time leading rusher (4,054) yards, quarterback Marc Bulger becoming the school's career passing yards leader (5,995) and wide receiver David Saunders becoming the school's career leader in receiving yards. Page was an athletic coaching education major.

== Professional career ==
=== Dallas Cowboys ===
Page was selected by the Dallas Cowboys in the second-round (55th overall) of the 1999 NFL draft. During training camp he was moved to offensive guard.

He made his NFL debut against the Arizona Cardinals on October 3, which was also his first professional start, as a right tackle replacement for injured starter Erik Williams. Beginning on November 21, Page started five consecutive games at left guard replacing injured starter Larry Allen. As a rookie, he contributed to the Cowboys offensive line allowing just 24 sacks, the second fewest in the NFL, while allowing one or fewer sacks in nine-of-16 games. In addition, the offensive line helped running back Emmitt Smith to his highest single-season rushing total (1,397) since 1995.

In 2000, Page began the season as the starting right guard and was part of an offensive line that surrendered 35 sacks, with only 12 teams allowing fewer on the season. In the opener against Philadelphia, he started the game at right guard but was shifted to right tackle after start Williams was ejected. Later in the season on December 10, against the Washington Redskins Page started at guard but moved to right tackle again when Williams suffered a neck injury early in the second half.

In 2001, he was moved to right tackle to replace Williams who had left via free agency to play for the Baltimore Ravens. He was part of an offensive line that helped the Cowboys finish third in the league in rushing with 136.5 yards-per-game. The offensive line also helped Emmitt Smith rush for a league record 11th consecutive 1,000-yard season, while he also moved into second place on the NFL's all-time career rushing list with 16,187 career yards. The offensive line also allowed just 34 sacks in 447 pass plays on the season. Just 12 teams allowed fewer sacks for the year and only eight teams lost fewer yards due to sacks than the 190 lost by the Cowboys.

It is believed 2002 was the first time an NFL franchise had five African American starters on their offensive line, when the Cowboys lined up rookie center Andre Gurode, tackles Flozell Adams and Page, guards Larry Allen and Kelvin Garmon. That season, he started in 15 games (10 at right tackle and 5 at right guard). He also became part of history as the starting guard on the Cowboys offensive line that helped Emmitt Smith eclipse Walter Payton as the NFL's all-time leading rusher, playing against the Seattle Seahawks on October 27.

=== San Diego Chargers ===
On June 5, 2003, he was signed by the San Diego Chargers as a free agent, reuniting with Hudson Houck who was his offensive line coach with the Cowboys. In his one season with the Chargers, he played in eight games (missed eight with a sprained left ankle injury), with seven starts at right guard, helping the team rush for 2,146 and pass for 3,226, sixth and 22nd in the league respectively.

=== Detroit Lions ===
On July 27, 2004, he was signed as a free agent by the Detroit Lions. He was waived on August 23.

=== New York Giants ===
On August 25, 2004, he signed with the New York Giants as a free agent. He was released on September 5.

== Personal life ==
Page is currently an offensive line coach at Carrollton Christian Academy in Carrollton, Texas.
