= Brashear High School =

Public school in Pennsylvania, USA

Location
- 590 Crane Avenue; Pittsburgh, Pennsylvania 15216; United States; 40°25′08″N 80°01′05″W

Information
- Type: Public
- Established: 1976
- School district: Pittsburgh Public Schools
- Principal: Kimberly Safran
- Teaching staff: 85.50 (FTE)
- Grades: 9–12
- Student to teacher ratio: 10.78
- Colors: Black and Vegas gold
- Mascot: Bulls
- Website: School website

Brashear High School is a large, urban, magnet, public school in the Beechview neighborhood of Pittsburgh, Pennsylvania, United States. Brashear is one of four high schools in the Pittsburgh Public Schools. In the 2010–2011 school year, the school had 1,214 pupils with 615 males and 566 females. It employed 87 teachers. Since then, the school has acquired students from the transition with Langley High School. It is currently the largest high school in the district, with approximately 1,480 students and 105 teachers.

== Feeder District ==
The City of Pittsburgh neighborhoods which are served by Brashear High School are as follows: Banksville, Beechview, Brookline, Chartiers City, Crafton Heights, Duquesne Heights, East Carnegie, Elliot, Esplen, Fairywood, Mount Washington, Oakwood, Ridgemont, Sheraden, South Shore, Southside Flats, West End, Westwood, and Windgap.

== History ==
Established in 1976, it is named in the honor of John A. Brashear, an astronomer and inventor. It was created to help with segregation issues in the Pittsburgh Public Schools. The Pittsburgh Board of Education closed Fifth Avenue High School, Gladstone High School in Hazelwood and South Hills High School and merged the students in the building with 5000 or more students attending. The school opened with protesters from Brookline and Beechview communities, as well as the Hill and Hazelwood, the school had mass media coverage, and School Security and local Police were on hand the first week of school in 1976. The school colors are black and gold, and the original school mascot were Bullets, depicted by two large bullets with mean faces and fists clenched. They were replaced in the early-1990s with a new mascot the Bull in response to staff concerns the Bullet logo and name could be attributed to recent gang violence in the city.

== Notable alumni ==
- Sam Clancy, former NFL player
- Leander Jordan, former NFL player
- Mario Joyner, comedian
- Solomon Page, former NFL player
- Rasheed Marshall, former NFL player
- John Wetzel, former NFL player
