= Joe Vellano =

American football player (born 1988)

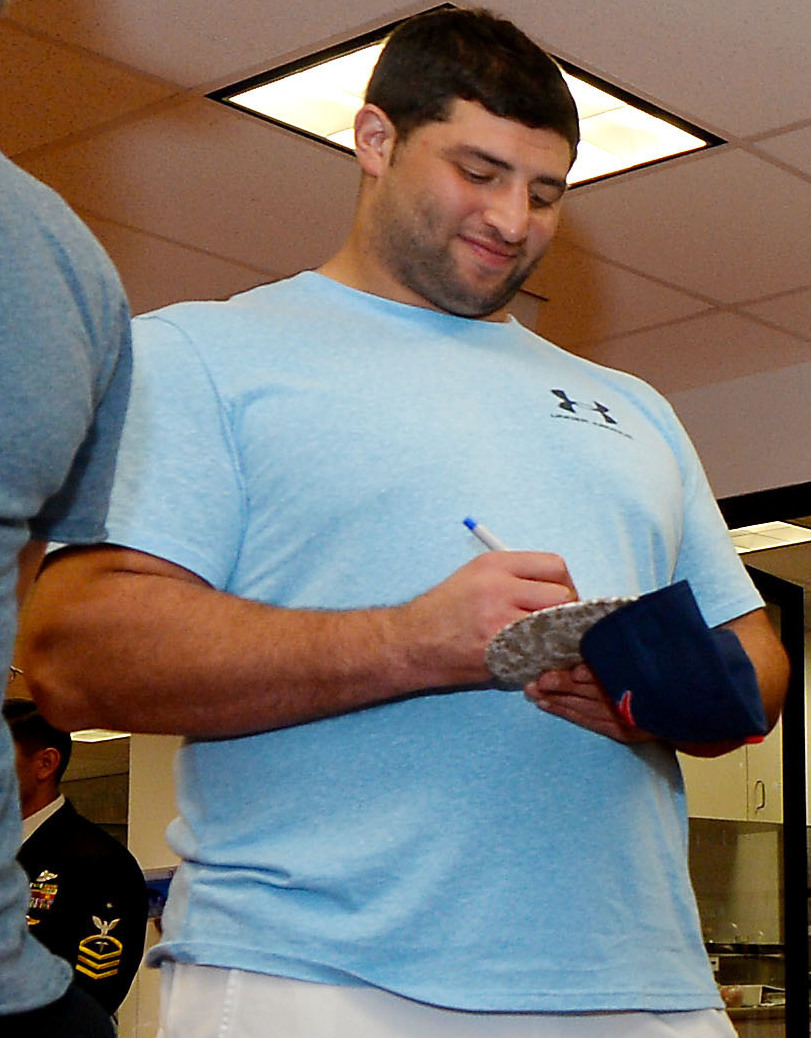
- Vellano at Naval Medical Center San Diego in 2014

No. 72, 92, 94
- Position: Defensive tackle

Personal information
- Born: October 30, 1988 (age 38); Clifton Park, New York, U.S.
- Listed height: 6 ft 2 in (1.88 m)
- Listed weight: 300 lb (136 kg)

Career information
- High school: Christian Brothers Academy (Albany, New York)
- College: Maryland
- NFL draft: 2013: undrafted

Career history
- New England Patriots (2013–2015); Indianapolis Colts (2015)*; New England Patriots (2016)*; Atlanta Falcons (2016–2017); Dallas Cowboys (2017–2018)*; Parma Panthers (2019–2020)
- * Offseason or practice squad member only

Awards and highlights
- Super Bowl champion (XLIX); Second-team All-American (2011); 2× First-team All-ACC (2011, 2012); Second-team All-ACC (2010)

Career NFL statistics
- Total tackles: 64
- Sacks: 3
- Fumble recoveries: 1
- Stats at Pro Football Reference

Joe Vellano (born October 30, 1988) is an American former professional football player who was a defensive tackle in the National Football League (NFL). He played college football for the Maryland Terrapins, and signed with the New England Patriots of the National Football League (NFL) as an undrafted free agent in 2013. He was also a member of the Indianapolis Colts, Atlanta Falcons, and Dallas Cowboys of the NFL, and the Parma Panthers of the Italian Football League.

== College career ==
Vellano played at the University of Maryland, College Park, for the Terrapins from 2008–2012. He redshirted his first season in 2008. In the 2009 season, he appeared in four games and recorded one tackle. In the 2010 season, he recorded 63 total tackles, 10.5 tackles-for-loss, five sacks, two passes defended, and one forced fumble. In the 2011 season, he recorded 94 total tackles, 7.5 tackles-for-loss, 2.5 sacks, four passes defended, two forced fumbles, one fumble recovery, and one defensive touchdown. In his final collegiate season in 2012, he recorded 61 total tackles, 14 tackles-for-loss, six sacks, and one interception.

== Professional career ==
Pre-draft measurables
Height	Weight	Arm length	Hand span	40-yard dash
6 ft 1 3/8 in (1.86 m)	306 lb (139 kg)	32 1/4 in (0.82 m)	8 5/8 in (0.22 m)	5.35 s
All values from NFL Combine

=== New England Patriots (first stint) ===
On April 30, 2013, Vellano signed with the New England Patriots as an undrafted free agent. In Week 5 against the Cincinnati Bengals, he received his first career start in place of Vince Wilfork, who was placed on injured reserve.

Vellano became a Super Bowl champion on February 1, 2015, helping the Patriots win Super Bowl XLIX over the Seattle Seahawks, 28–24.

On August 31, 2015, the Patriots released Vellano. He was re-signed to the practice squad on September 26, and released again on September 30.

=== Indianapolis Colts ===
On December 22, 2015, Vellano signed to the practice squad of the Indianapolis Colts.

=== New England Patriots (second stint) ===
On January 26, 2016, the Patriots signed Vellano to a futures contract. On September 3, 2016, he was released by the Patriots as part of final roster cuts.

=== Atlanta Falcons ===
On September 6, 2016, Vellano was signed to the Falcons' practice squad due to Adrian Clayborn being put on Injured Reserve. He was promoted to the active roster on January 17, 2017. The Falcons ultimately made Super Bowl LI, but lost to Vellano's former team, the New England Patriots. In the game, Vellano had one total tackle.

On September 2, 2017, Vellano was waived by the Falcons and signed to the practice squad the next day. He was promoted to the active roster on September 21, 2017. He was waived on October 24, 2017.

=== Dallas Cowboys ===
On November 8, 2017, Vellano was signed to the Dallas Cowboys' practice squad. He signed a reserve/future contract with the Cowboys on January 1, 2018. He was waived on March 7, 2018.

=== Parma Panthers ===
In 2019, Vallano signed and played with the Parma Panthers in the Italian Football League. The Panthers lost in the league playoffs in 2019 and 2020.

== Personal life ==
Vellano was born and raised in Rexford, New York. He graduated from Christian Brothers Academy in 2007.
