= John W. Pauly =

United States Air Force general

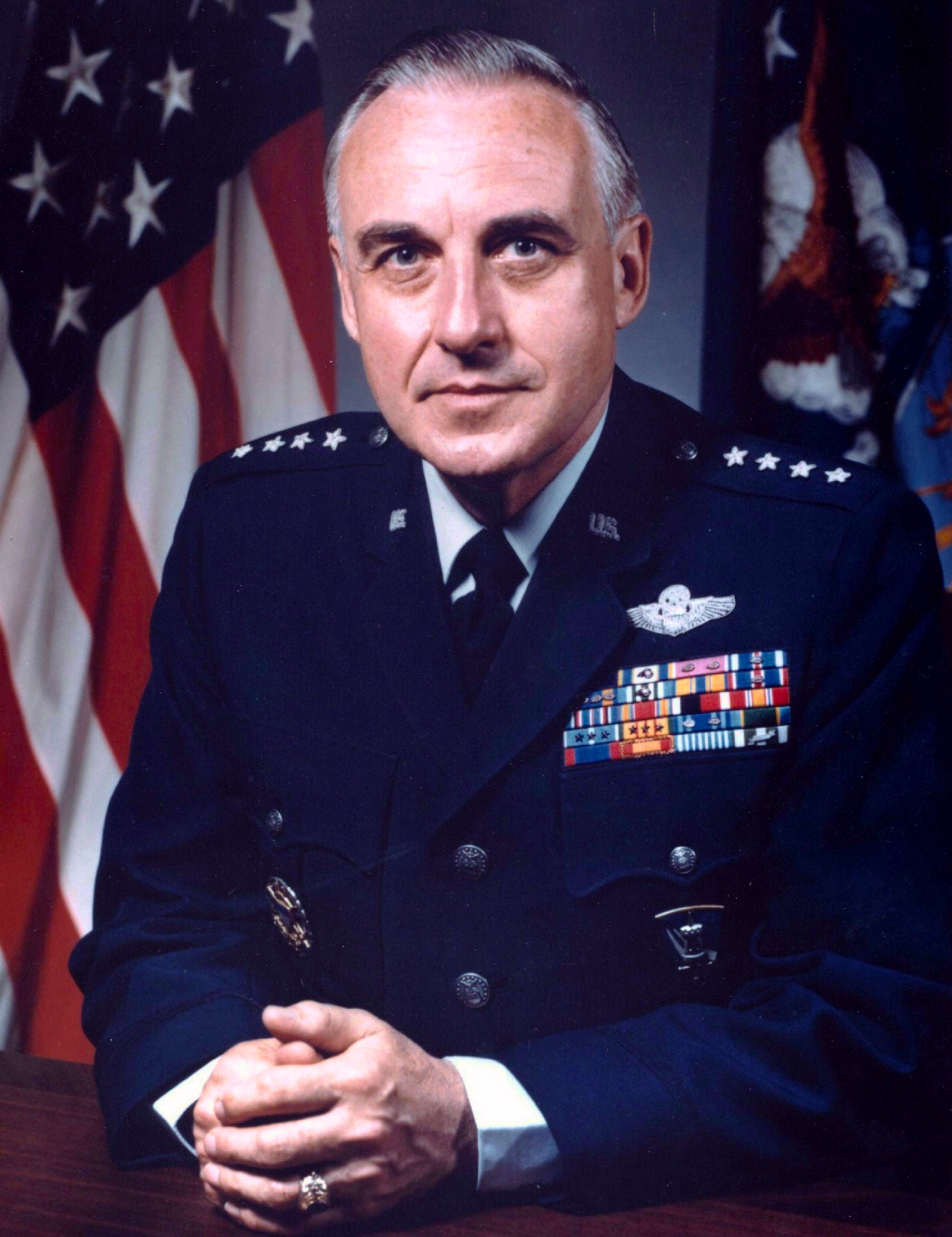
- General John W. Pauly
- Born: March 12, 1923; Albany, New York
- Died: August 7, 2013 (aged 90); Colorado Springs, Colorado
- Military career
- Allegiance: United States
- Branch: United States Air Force
- Service years: 1941–1979
- Rank: General
- Commands: 315th Air Commando Wing; 1st Strategic Aerospace Division; United States Air Forces Europe; Allied Air Forces Central Europe
- Conflicts: World War II; Cold War; Korean War; Vietnam War

John William Pauly (March 12, 1923 – August 7, 2013) was a general in the Allied Air Forces Central Europe, and commander in chief, United States Air Forces in Europe, with headquarters at Ramstein Air Base, Germany.

== Biography ==
=== World War II ===
Pauly was born in Albany, New York, in 1923. He graduated from Christian Brothers Academy in Albany in 1940, and attended Rensselaer Polytechnic Institute in Troy, New York, for two years before entering the United States Military Academy at West Point in 1942. He received a commission as a second lieutenant and a bachelor of science degree from the academy in June 1945. He also earned his pilot wings while attending the academy.

Following graduation from West Point, he attended B-25 Mitchell and B-17 Flying Fortress transition training and Junior Officers Staff School prior to reporting to the 60th Troop Carrier Group, Munich, Germany, in February 1946. He later served there as an instructor at the Central Pilots School of the United States Air Forces in Europe and as assistant operations officer for the 11th Troop Carrier Squadron.

Returning to the United States in June 1948, he was assigned as a training officer and later as commander of the headquarters squadron for the Mobile Air Materiel Area, Brookley Air Force Base, Alabama.

In November 1951, during the Korean War, Pauly was assigned to the 8th Bombardment Squadron, 3rd Bombardment Wing, at Kunsan Air Base, as flying safety officer and squadron operations officer. While with the 3rd Bombardment Wing, he flew 55 night intruder combat missions, totaling 230 combat hours in Douglas B-26 Invader aircraft.

Following his tour of duty in Korea, Pauly was assigned to Headquarters Tactical Air Command, Langley Air Force Base, Virginia, in July 1952. Over a span of almost four years, he served first as an operations staff officer and later as chief of the bombardment division within the Operations Directorate.

In February 1956 he returned to Germany and served in a North Atlantic Treaty Organization assignment with Headquarters 4th Allied Tactical Air Force as an operations officer within the Bombardment Division and executive officer for the deputy chief of staff, operations.

=== Later career ===
Pauly was assigned to Headquarters United States Air Force in July 1959 and served as a planning and programming officer in the Directorate of Plans until 1962, when he became the assistant executive officer to General Curtis E. LeMay, then the Chief of Staff of the United States Air Force.

In August 1964 he entered the National War College in Washington, D.C., and upon graduation the following summer become the deputy commander for operations, 317th Troop Carrier Wing, Lockbourne Air Force Base, Ohio. Pauly was awarded a master of science degree in international relations from The George Washington University in 1965.

Pauly was assigned as the deputy chief of staff, operations, for the 315th Air Division, Tachikawa Air Base, Japan, in June 1966. In July 1968 he assumed command of the 315th Air Commando Wing at Phan Rang Air Base, Republic of Vietnam.

In July 1969 Pauly was transferred to the Organization of the Joint Chiefs of Staff, Washington, D.C., as the Air Force member of the Chairman's Staff Group, while General Earle G. Wheeler was chairman. In September 1970 he was assigned as deputy director for regional operations, J-3, of the Joint Staff and in June 1972 became vice director for operations of the Joint Staff.

Pauly assumed command of the 1st Strategic Aerospace Division with headquarters at Vandenberg Air Force Base, California, in August 1973. In July 1974 he returned to Washington and served as assistant to the chairman, Joint Chiefs of Staff and, in September 1975 become the deputy chief of staff for plans and operations, Headquarters United States Air Force. In July 1976 Pauly was assigned as vice commander in chief, United States Air Forces Europe, and in August 1978 was appointed commander in chief for the unit as well as Allied Air Forces in Central Europe commander.

He was promoted to the grade of general on August 1, 1978, with same date of rank. He retired on July 31, 1980.

In 2001, he was awarded a Distinguished Alumni Award from his alma mater, the Christian Brothers Academy.

== Death ==
Pauly died August 7, 2013, at a hospice center in Colorado Springs. He was 90. He had Alzheimer's disease.

== Awards ==
Awards earned during his career:

- Air Force Distinguished Service Medal with an oak leaf cluster
- Legion of Merit with two oak leaf clusters
- Distinguished Flying Cross with an oak leaf cluster
- Air Medal with four oak leaf clusters
- Joint Service Commendation Medal with an oak leaf cluster
- Air Force Commendation Medal
- Distinguished Service Order (Vietnam), Air Force (2nd class)
- Gallantry Cross with palm
- Command pilot with more than 6,000 hours of flying time

== See also ==
- List of commanders of USAFE
