= Christian Brothers Academy (Albany, New York) =

Private school in Albany, New York, US

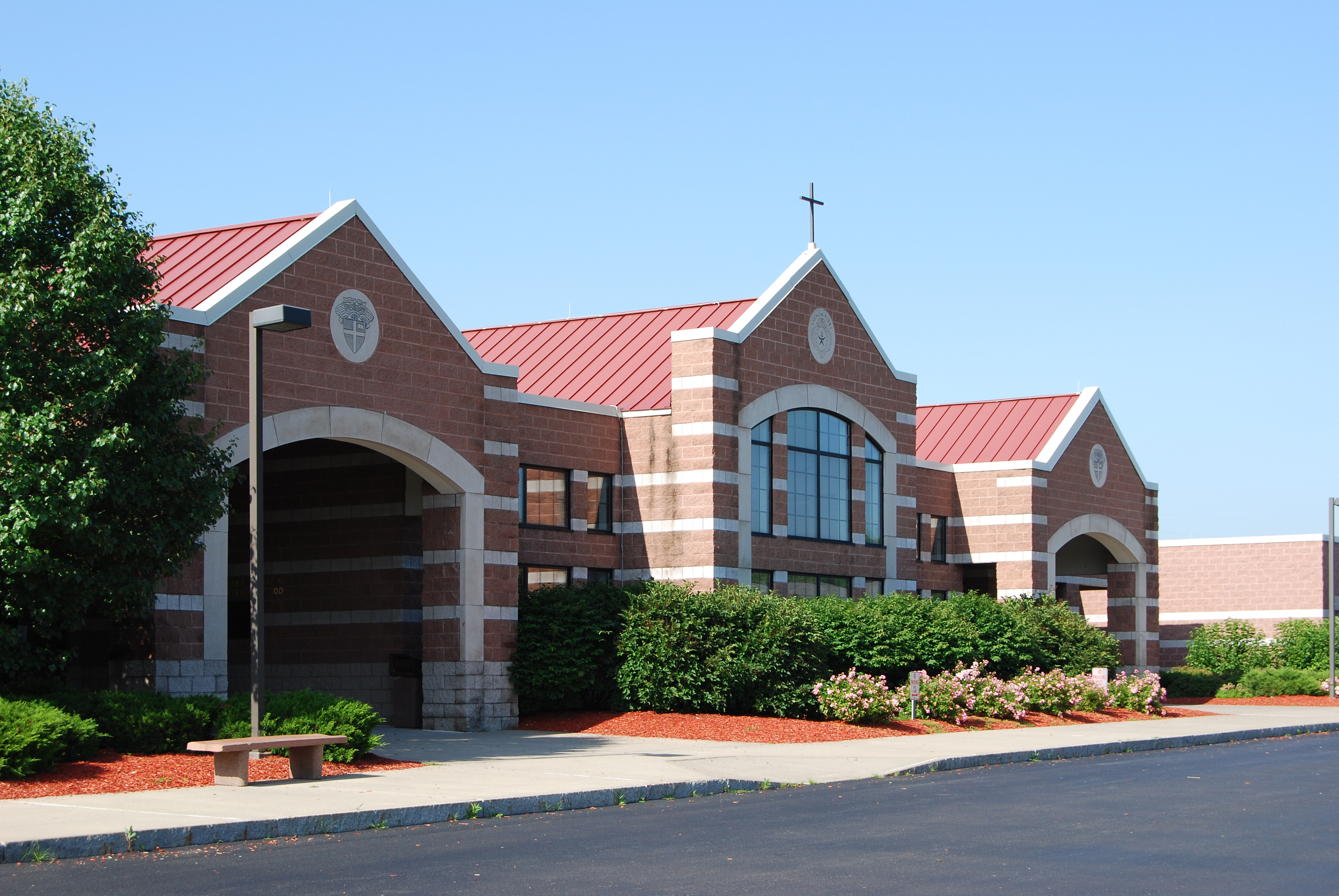
- Christian Brothers Academy, 2009

Location
- 12 Airline Drive; Albany, New York 12205; 42°43′57″N 73°49′14″W

Information
- Type: Private, Day
- Motto: Signum Fidei ("Sign of Faith")
- Religious affiliations: Roman Catholic; Christian Brothers
- Patron saint: St. John Baptist de La Salle
- Established: 1859
- Founder: Brothers of the Christian Schools
- School district: Independent
- President: James Schlegel
- Chairperson: William Anthony ’81
- Principal: Charles Abba
- Staff: 64
- Grades: 5-12
- Gender: Boys
- Campus: Suburban
- Campus size: 126 acres (0.51 km^{2})
- Colors: Purple & Vegas gold
- Slogan: A Tradition of Excellence Since 1859
- Athletics: 15 interscholastic sports: 35 individual teams
- Athletics conference: Section 2- Suburban Council
- Team name: Brothers
- Rival: La Salle Institute
- Accreditation: Middle States Association of Colleges and Schools
- Publication: CBA Chronicles
- Newspaper: The Sentry
- Website: www.cbaalbany.org

Christian Brothers Academy is a private, Catholic, college preparatory, junior and senior high school for boys founded in 1859 by the De La Salle Christian Brothers (See Institute of the Brothers of the Christian Schools). Christian Brothers Academy (CBA) is located in the town of Colonie, New York near the Albany International Airport on a 126-acre (0.51 km^{2}) campus built in 1998. Christian Brothers Academy is independently run by a board of trustees.

== History ==
In 1854, the Christian Brothers were invited to Albany by Bishop John McCloskey, to open an orphan asylum for boys. To help support the asylum, the Brothers began a pay school in 1859 in which eighty boys enrolled. Stagecoaches carried the boys from downtown to the school's rural location. After a few years, a separate building on Madison Avenue was secured. In 1869, the school was chartered by the University of the State of New York and a brass band was incorporated at the school. Over the next twenty years, the school outgrew its facilities several times. Each time, it relocated to a larger site. In 1882, the school moved to Lydius Street and in 1886, the Brothers purchased the former Albany Normal College at 43 Lodge Street from the State Education Department. Classes were conducted in this building for the next fifty-one years.

During 1892, military training was introduced and the Civil War Zouave uniform was adopted for the cadets. Enrollment at Lodge Street followed a pattern of ups and downs. Since the lack of a suitable campus did not help attract students, the building itself became a liability.

In 1935, the Brothers realized that the dilapidated structure, nearly a century old, could no longer support the school's necessary new programs. They began a movement to secure property and funds to erect a new, modern building. Through the interest of influential friends and alumni, city and county officials in 1937 made available to the Brothers a plot of land. Popular response to the fund drive was immediate and generous. Bishop Edmund Gibbons and Mayor John Boyd Thatcher II urged all citizens of Albany to contribute. Also in 1937, CBA was accredited as a military academy by the United States government. In 2012, the school's administration and the board of trustees made the decision to become a Junior Reserve Officers' Training Corps (JROTC) optional institution.

The De La Salle Road campus on University Heights, featuring the Georgian Colonial school building, was opened in September 1939 in time for the school's eightieth year. The gymnasium building was added in 1942, and the Brothers' residence in 1951. The old "Alm's House" building on the new University Heights campus, popularly called "the Armory", initially housed the rifle range in its basement, and the upper floors served as an arms room and a military classroom. In later years, a biology laboratory was added to the lower floor. One unique feature of the lab was the inclusion of small live animals, which were cared for by the students. Also in this building was "the Cage", which served as the locker room for the football and track programs. In 1951, the school added a seventh and eighth grade and in 1991, the school added a sixth grade.

Eventually, the De La Salle Road site was in need of updating and refurbishing. The University Heights Association, Inc., made an $8.4 million offer for the property and plans were made to move the school to the Town of Colonie. The new campus was erected with a price of $13.5 million. The new campus features a 75,000 square foot academic building along with a 9,000 square foot Christian Brothers residence. The new campus on Airline Drive incorporated current technological advancements into its design and structure. Multiple science labs, a technology center, as well as a lecture hall equipped with all the latest media tools, became available to faculty and students.

Since the new campus opened in 1998, the school's buildings and grounds have undergone extensive refurbishments to keep the campus updated and secure. These renovations included an expanded cafeteria, a second baseball field, and a new wing. This wing was part of the schools $5.2 million Capital Campaign that launched in 2015. The wing added a new professionally designed music room, a new STEM lab, and four additional classrooms to accommodate the school's growing enrollment. An additional 2-phase, $4 million Capital Campaign saw the addition of a multi-sport synthetic turf field in 2021, and an all-season athletic dome in 2023. The school now offers over 86,000 square feet of instructional and administrative spaces, and over 30 acres of dedicated athletic facilities.

CBA currently offers a college preparatory program for young men in grades 5 through 12. In 2016, the school's administration approved the addition of fifth grade to the school. CBA educates over 570 students in grades 5-12 from 49 school districts throughout the Capital Region.

== Academics ==
In both the high school and the junior high school, there is an honors course of study available to qualified students. In the junior high, honors students in the eighth grade are permitted to study Algebra 1 and biology, which are course offerings at the ninth grade level. The high school program allows students to take honors level courses in all of the core disciplines (mathematics, science, social studies, English and foreign language) through a combination of Advanced Placement (AP) offerings and regularly scheduled courses.

The College Board offers the AP program to high schools as an opportunity for students to pursue advanced credit in specific disciplines. The school offers AP courses in Spanish V (also College in High School/"CHS"), statistics, calculus, biology, physics, chemistry, US history, world history, English literature and composition, English language and composition, and computer science. Students who wish to enroll in AP courses must meet all prerequisites for the Honors Program. Additionally, students enrolled in an AP course are required to sit for the AP exams scheduled in May, and to pay all necessary fees for the course.

Christian Brothers Academy also offers courses for college credit through local colleges and universities. The school offers Advertising I, Principles of Marketing, Accounting I, Advanced Algebra and Topics, Advanced Algebra, Music Theory, Advanced Computer Applications, and CMPT 115 (Introduction to Business Analytics with Microsoft Excel) through Hudson Valley Community College's "College in the High School" program. Through the University at Albany's "University in the High School" program, CBA offers Spanish V (which also can be taken for AP credit), Spanish IV, and pre-calculus.

== Athletics ==
Christian Brothers Academy participates in athletics under the guidelines of Section II and the New York Public High School Athletic Association. Christian Brothers Academy formerly participated in the Big 10 athletic league until its disbanding in 2014. Christian Brothers Academy joined the Suburban Council in the 2015–2016 school year. CBA's athletics program is classified by Section II as a "Class AA" school, the highest classification in New York State.

CBA offers numerous athletic teams at the varsity, junior varsity, freshman, and modified levels. CYO basketball is also offered for the middle school.

Sports Offered
Fall	Winter	Spring
Football	Basketball	Baseball
Golf	Ice Hockey	Lacrosse
Cross Country	Indoor Track & Field	Outdoor Track & Field
Soccer	Bowling	Tennis
Volleyball	Swimming	
	Wrestling	

== Student population ==
Christian Brothers Academy Enrollment
School Year	Enrollment
2017–2018	553
2018–2019	549
2019–2020	540
2020–2021	554
2021–2022	560
2022–2023	565
2023–2024	570
2024-2025	570

CBA's students come from a large geographic area. As of the 2023–2024 school year, CBA has an enrollment of over 570 students who represent 49 different school districts. Approximately 1/4th of its students live in cities, and 3/4ths of its students come from suburban areas. Some travel upwards of 50 miles to be a part of the CBA community and the CBA tradition. As of September 2021, the four largest districts of residence by enrollment were Shenendehowa, South Colonie, North Colonie, and Albany. Students from these four districts make up at least half of the school's total enrollment.

== Notable alumni yes ==
- Ronald Canestrari - New York State Assembly member
- RIchard Jude Ciccolella - television and film actor and singer
- Vincent J. Donehue - theater director
- William Kennedy - author
- Jordan King - basketball player
- Edward A. Maher - mayor of Albany
- Harry Marra - track and field coach
- John McEneny - member of the New York State Assembly (1992–2012) and historian
- William D. Mulholland - banker
- Howard C. Nolan Jr. - member of New York State Senate from 1975 to 1994
- John W. Pauly - U.S. Air Force general; 1978-80: commander-in-chief, United States Air Forces in Europe
- Joseph T. Ryan - archbishop (1966–75) of the Roman Catholic Archdiocese of Anchorage, then archbishop (1985–91) for the Military Services (Military Ordinate)
- Joe Tessitore - sportscaster
- Joe Vellano - NFL defensive tackle

== Campus locations ==
Location	Years
Western Turnpike	1859-1862
Lydius Street	1862-1868
Beaver Street	1868-1877
Madison Avenue	1877-1886
Lodge Street	1886-1939
De La Salle Road	1939-1998
Airline Drive	1998–present

== Accreditation ==
The school is accredited by the New York State Board of Regents, the Middle States Association of Colleges and Schools, and the high school JROTC program is designated as an "Honor Unit With Distinction" by the United States Department of the Army.
