= John Wetzel (American football) =

American football player (born 1991)

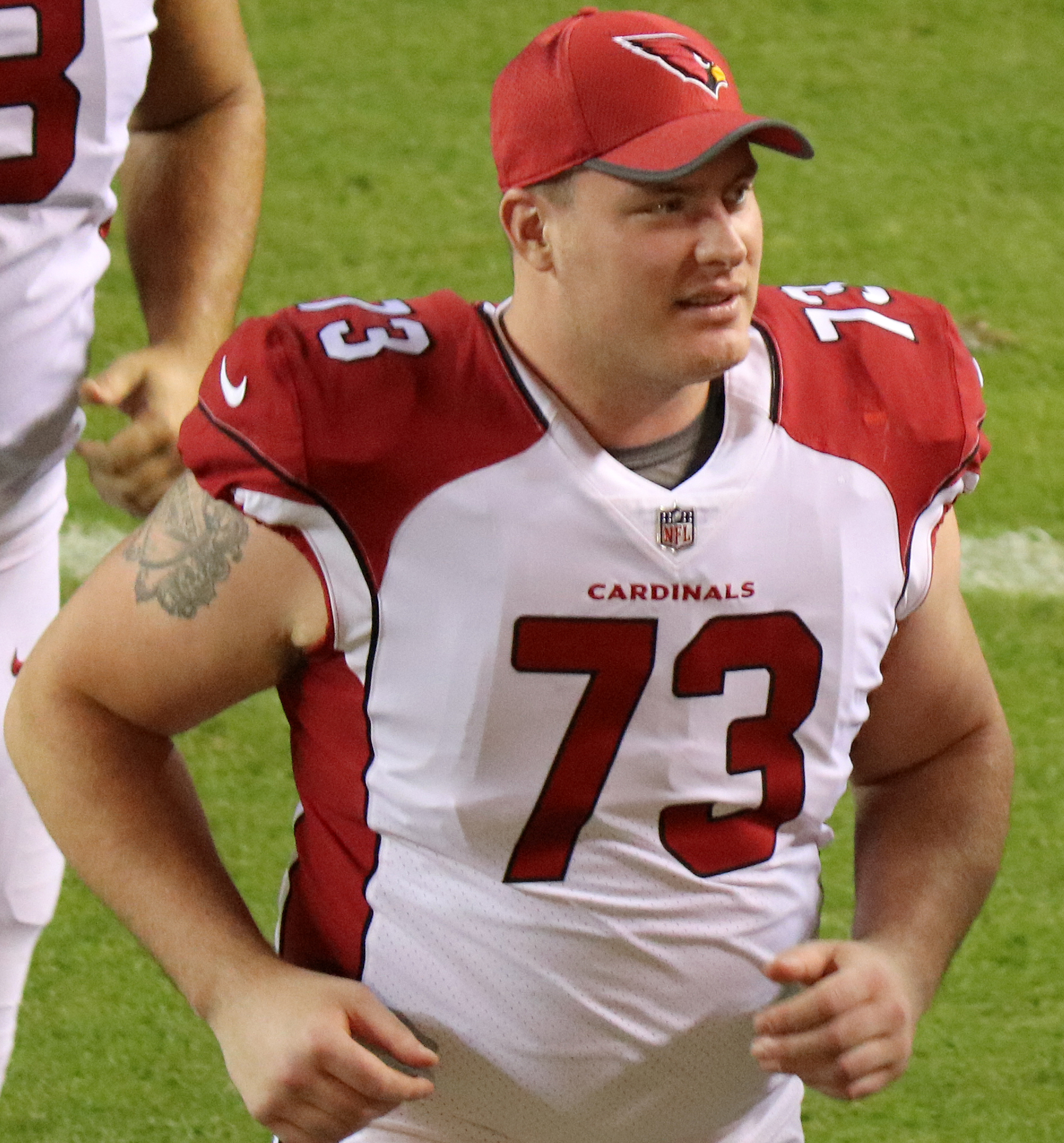
- Wetzel with the Arizona Cardinals in 2017

No. 73, 75
- Position: Offensive guard

Personal information
- Born: July 18, 1991 (age 35); Pittsburgh, Pennsylvania, U.S.
- Listed height: 6 ft 7 in (2.01 m)
- Listed weight: 328 lb (149 kg)

Career information
- High school: Brashear (Pittsburgh)
- College: Boston College
- NFL draft: 2013: undrafted

Career history
- Oakland Raiders (2013)*; Dallas Cowboys (2013–2015)*; Indianapolis Colts (2015)*; Arizona Cardinals (2015–2018); Atlanta Falcons (2019–2020)
- * Offseason or practice squad member only

Career NFL statistics
- Games played: 46
- Games started: 24
- Stats at Pro Football Reference

John William Wetzel (born July 18, 1991) is an American former professional football player who was an offensive guard in the National Football League (NFL). He was signed by the Oakland Raiders as an undrafted free agent in 2013. He played college football for the Boston College Eagles.

== Early life ==
Wetzel attended Brashear High School, where he played as a two-way player at offensive tackle and defensive end. As a junior, he became a starter.

As a senior, he posted 70 tackles (52 solo) and 7 sacks, He contributed to the school winning consecutive City League titles (2007 and 2008), while being named a two-time All-City selection.

He also competed in basketball, volleyball, and track.

== College career ==
Wetzel accepted a football scholarship from Boston College. As a true freshman, he was a backup offensive tackle behind Anthony Castonzo and appeared in 6 games.

As a sophomore, he was a backup offensive tackle and appeared in 8 games. As a junior, he became a starter after Castonzo graduated and started 12 games at left tackle.

As a senior, he was moved to right tackle, so that Emmett Cleary could handle the left side.

== Professional career ==
Pre-draft measurables
Height	Weight	Arm length	Hand span	40-yard dash	20-yard shuttle	Three-cone drill	Vertical jump	Broad jump	Bench press
6 ft 7 in (2.01 m)	315 lb (143 kg)	34 in (0.86 m)	10 in (0.25 m)	5.46 s	4.81 s	7.90 s	25.0 in (0.64 m)	8 ft 9 in (2.67 m)	22 reps
All values from NFL Combine

=== Oakland Raiders ===
On April 29, 2013, Wetzel was signed as an undrafted free agent by the Oakland Raiders. He suffered a torn MCL in the second preseason game against the New Orleans Saints. On August 20, he was waived/injured by the Raiders. On the next day, he cleared waivers and was placed on the injured reserve list. On August 24, he was waived from the team with an injury settlement.

=== Dallas Cowboys ===
On November 12, 2013, he was signed by the Dallas Cowboys to the practice squad. The team had scouted him in the first preseason game against the Oakland Raiders. On January 8, 2014, Wetzel signed a reserve/future contract. On August 31, he was waived. On September 2, he was signed to the practice squad. On January 12, 2015, he signed another reserve/future contract.

On September 5, 2015, Wetzel was waived by the Cowboys. On September 7, 2015, he was signed to the Cowboys' practice squad after clearing waivers. On November 12, he was released.

=== Indianapolis Colts ===
On November 24, 2015, Wetzel signed with the Indianapolis Colts practice squad. He was released by the Colts on December 1.

=== Arizona Cardinals ===
On December 9, 2015, the Arizona Cardinals signed Wetzel to their practice squad. On January 26, 2016, he signed a future/reserve contract. The Arizona Cardinals began starting Wetzel as their left tackle after October 31, 2016, to replace injured starting left tackle Jared Veldheer.

On March 7, 2017, Wetzel signed an exclusive-rights tender from the Cardinals. On April 18, he signed a one-year deal. He started 11 games at left tackle for the Cardinals in 2017 in place of the injured D. J. Humphries. On April 3, 2018, Wetzel signed another one-year deal to stay with the Cardinals. On November 3, 2018, he was placed on injured reserve with a neck injury.

=== Atlanta Falcons ===
On April 16, 2019, Wetzel signed a one-year contract with the Atlanta Falcons. He was released on August 31, 2019. He was re-signed on September 9, 2019, following an injury to Chris Lindstrom. He spent time on and off the Falcons active roster before being released on October 26, 2019. He was re-signed on December 2.

On March 4, 2020, Wetzel re-signed with the Falcons. On September 6, 2020, Wetzel was released and re-signed to the practice squad. He was promoted to the active roster on September 15, 2020.
