= Matt Furstenburg =

American football player (born 1989)

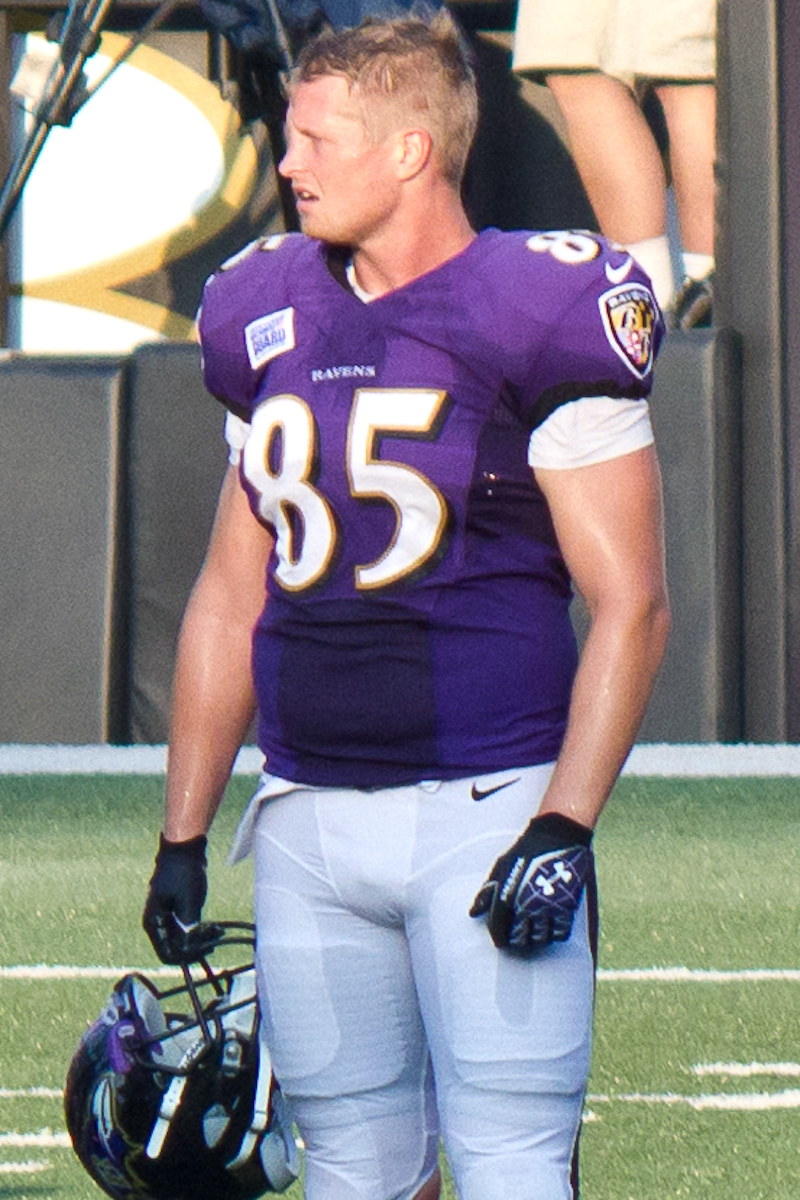
- Furstenburg at Ravens M&T Bank Stadium practice in August 2013.

No. 85
- Position: Tight end

Personal information
- Born: June 19, 1989 (age 37); Flemington, New Jersey
- Listed height: 6 ft 3 in (1.91 m)
- Listed weight: 244 lb (111 kg)

Career information
- College: Maryland
- NFL draft: 2013: undrafted

Career history
- Baltimore Ravens (2013–2014)*
- * Offseason or practice squad member only
- Stats at Pro Football Reference

Matt Furstenburg (born June 19, 1989) is an American former football tight end. He played college football at the University of Maryland. He signed as an undrafted free agent with the Baltimore Ravens in 2014.

== Early life ==
He was a two-sport athlete in Flemington, New Jersey. He helped his high-school football team win a state title as an all-state tight end and defensive lineman in which he recorded 400 receiving yards and eight sacks during high school.

== Professional career ==
Pre-draft measurables
Height	Weight	Arm length	Hand span	40-yard dash	20-yard shuttle	Three-cone drill	Vertical jump	Broad jump	Bench press
6 ft 3 in (1.91 m)	242 lb (110 kg)	31 3/4 in (0.81 m)	8 5/8 in (0.22 m)	4.62 s	4.35 s	7.09 s	35.5 in (0.90 m)	115 ft 0 in (35.05 m)	18 reps
All values from the NFL Combine

On April 27, 2013, Furstenburg signed with the Baltimore Ravens as an undrafted free agent. He was waived on August 30, 2013. Furstenburg spent time on the practice squad during the 2013 season. He was released by the Ravens in May 2014 as part of roster moves made after the 2014 NFL draft.

== After football ==
After his short stint in the NFL, Fustenburg became a co-founder and one of the original inventors of Grip Boost, a gel product with the purpose of restoring the tackiness of sports gloves. In 2018, Grip Boost football gloves were ranked the best football gloves with the #1 grip in football.
