= Eastern Michigan Eagles football statistical leaders =

The Eastern Michigan Eagles football statistical leaders are individual statistical leaders of the Eastern Michigan Eagles football program in various categories, including passing, rushing, receiving, total offense, defensive stats, and kicking. Within those areas, the lists identify single-game, single-season, and career leaders. The Eagles represent Eastern Michigan University in the NCAA's Mid-American Conference.

Although Eastern Michigan began competing in intercollegiate football in 1891, the school's official record book considers the "modern era" to have begun in 1951. Records from before this year are often incomplete and inconsistent, and they are generally not included in these lists.

These lists are dominated by more recent players for several reasons:

- Since 1951, seasons have increased from 10 games to 11 and then 12 games in length.
- The NCAA didn't allow freshmen to play varsity football until 1972 (with the exception of the World War II years), allowing players to have four-year careers.
- However, the effect isn't as extreme for Eastern Michigan as it is in many other schools. While the NCAA only recognizes bowl game statistics as part of single-season and career statistics in 2002 and later, the Eagles never played in a bowl until the 2016 Bahamas Bowl, and have played in only three since then (the 2018 Camellia Bowl, 2019 Quick Lane Bowl, and 2021 LendingTree Bowl). Similarly, the Eagles are the only MAC school not to have played in the MAC Football Championship Game.
- Due to COVID-19 issues, the NCAA declared that the 2020 season would not count against the athletic eligibility of any football player, giving everyone active in that season the opportunity for five years of eligibility instead of the standard four. However, the effect of this NCAA ruling was muted for all MAC teams because that conference played only a 6-game schedule in 2020 instead of the normal 12 games.

These lists are updated through the 2025 season.

== Passing ==
=== Passing yards ===
Career
| Rank | Player | Yards | Years |
|---|---|---|---|
| 1 | Walter Church | 9,142 | 1996 1998 1999 2000 |
| 2 | Brogan Roback | 8,653 | 2013 2014 2015 2016 2017 |
| 3 | Charlie Batch | 7,592 | 1994 1995 1996 1997 |
| 4 | Andy Schmitt | 5,867 | 2006 2007 2008 2009 |
| 5 | Matt Bohnet | 4,988 | 2004 2005 |
| 6 | Ron Adams | 4,757 | 1984 1985 1986 1987 |
| 7 | Mike Glass III | 4,193 | 2018 2019 |
| 8 | Alex Gillett | 3,900 | 2009 2010 2011 2012 |
| 9 | Tom Sullivan | 3,647 | 1986 1987 1988 1989 |
| 10 | Troy Edwards | 3,552 | 1999 2000 2001 2002 |

Single season
| Rank | Player | Yards | Year |
|---|---|---|---|
| 1 | Charlie Batch | 3,280 | 1997 |
| 2 | Charlie Batch | 3,177 | 1995 |
| 3 | Mike Glass III | 3,169 | 2019 |
| 4 | Ben Bryant | 3,121 | 2021 |
| 5 | Brogan Roback | 2,890 | 2017 |
| 6 | Noah Kim | 2,817 | 2025 |
| 7 | Matt Bohnet | 2,807 | 2004 |
| 8 | Troy Edwards | 2,762 | 2002 |
| 9 | Brogan Roback | 2,694 | 2016 |
| 10 | Cole Snyder | 2,684 | 2024 |

Single game
| Rank | Player | Yards | Years | Opponent |
|---|---|---|---|---|
| 1 | Andy Schmitt | 516 | 2008 | Central Michigan |
| 2 | Andy Schmitt | 484 | 2008 | Temple |
| 3 | Brogan Roback | 468 | 2016 | Ball State |
| 4 | Walter Church | 450 | 1996 | Central Michigan |
| 5 | Charlie Batch | 439 | 1997 | Akron |
| | Walter Church | 439 | 1998 | Western Michigan |
| 7 | Charlie Batch | 436 | 1997 | Western Michigan |
| 8 | Charlie Batch | 430 | 1995 | Toledo |
| 9 | Charlie Batch | 412 | 1995 | Ohio |
| 10 | Reginald Bell | 409 | 2014 | Ball State |

=== Passing touchdowns ===
Career
| Rank | Player | TDs | Years |
|---|---|---|---|
| 1 | Brogan Roback | 57 | 2013 2014 2015 2016 2017 |
| 2 | Charlie Batch | 53 | 1994 1995 1996 1997 |
| 3 | Walter Church | 43 | 1996 1998 1999 2000 |
| 4 | Matt Bohnet | 35 | 2004 2005 |
| | Alex Gillett | 35 | 2009 2010 2011 2012 |
| 6 | Bob Middlekauff | 33 | 1951 1952 1953 1954 |
| | Andy Schmitt | 33 | 2006 2007 2008 2009 |
| | Mike Glass III | 33 | 2018 2019 |
| 9 | Ron Adams | 26 | 1984 1985 1986 1987 |
| 10 | Troy Edwards | 24 | 1999 2000 2001 2002 |
| | Tyler Benz | 24 | 2011 2012 2013 |

Single season
| Rank | Player | TDs | Year |
|---|---|---|---|
| 1 | Mike Glass III | 24 | 2019 |
| 2 | Charlie Batch | 23 | 1997 |
| 3 | Troy Edwards | 22 | 2002 |
| 4 | Charlie Batch | 21 | 1995 |
| | Matt Bohnet | 21 | 2004 |
| 6 | Brogan Roback | 19 | 2017 |
| 7 | Brogan Roback | 18 | 2016 |
| | Noah Kim | 18 | 2025 |
| 9 | Brogan Roback | 16 | 2015 |
| | Taylor Powell | 16 | 2022 |

Single game
| Rank | Player | TDs | Years | Opponent |
|---|---|---|---|---|
| 1 | Kainoa Akina | 6 | 2011 | Akron |
| 2 | Andy Schmitt | 5 | 2008 | Central Michigan |
| | Tyler Benz | 5 | 2012 | Army |

== Rushing ==
=== Rushing yards ===
Career
| Rank | Player | Yards | Years |
|---|---|---|---|
| 1 | Gary Patton | 3,497 | 1984 1985 1986 1987 |
| 2 | Mike Strickland | 3,234 | 1972 1973 1974 |
| 3 | Anthony Sherrell | 2,888 | 2002 2003 2004 2005 |
| 4 | Larry Ratcliff | 2,848 | 1969 1970 1971 |
| 5 | Ricky Calhoun | 2,665 | 1980 1981 1982 1983 |
| 6 | Bobby Windom | 2,595 | 1975 1976 1977 |
| 7 | Shaq Vann | 2,577 | 2015 2016 2017 2018 2019 |
| 8 | Bronson Hill | 2,436 | 2011 2012 2013 2014 |
| 9 | Samson Evans | 2,302 | 2020 2021 2022 2023 |
| 10 | Stephen Whitfield | 2,167 | 1991 1992 1993 1994 |

Single season
| Rank | Player | Yards | Year |
|---|---|---|---|
| 1 | Anthony Sherrell | 1,531 | 2003 |
| 2 | Bobby Windom | 1,322 | 1977 |
| 3 | Gary Patton | 1,242 | 1987 |
| 4 | Stephen Whitfield | 1,232 | 1994 |
| 5 | Ime Akpan | 1,221 | 2002 |
| 6 | Mike Strickland | 1,203 | 1974 |
| 7 | Larry Ratcliff | 1,188 | 1971 |
| 8 | Samson Evans | 1,166 | 2022 |
| 9 | Mike Strickland | 1,105 | 1973 |
| 10 | Bronson Hill | 1,101 | 2013 |

Single game
| Rank | Player | Yards | Years | Opponent |
|---|---|---|---|---|
| 1 | Larry Ratcliff | 291 | 1971 | Eastern Kentucky |
| 2 | Bronson Hill | 283 | 2012 | Toledo |
| 3 | Samson Evans | 258 | 2022 | Arizona State |
| 4 | Bronson Hill | 257 | 2013 | Ohio |
| 5 | Larry Ratcliff | 251 | 1971 | Idaho State |
| 6 | Ime Akpan | 251 | 2002 | Southern Illinois |
| 7 | Mike Scott | 248 | 1996 | Miami (Ohio) |
| 8 | Bobby Windom | 239 | 1977 | Akron |
| 9 | Mike Strickland | 234 | 1974 | Western Michigan |
| 10 | Anthony Sherrell | 230 | 2003 | Ball State |

=== Rushing touchdowns ===
Career
| Rank | Player | TDs | Years |
|---|---|---|---|
| 1 | Samson Evans | 41 | 2020 2021 2022 2023 |
| 2 | Gary Patton | 26 | 1984 1985 1986 1987 |
| | Anthony Sherrell | 26 | 2002 2003 2004 2005 |
| 4 | Shaq Vann | 23 | 2015 2016 2017 2018 2019 |
| 5 | Bob Foster | 22 | 1986 1987 1988 |
| 6 | Ian Eriksen | 21 | 2015 2016 2017 2018 |
| 7 | Dwayne Priest | 20 | 2007 2008 2009 2010 |
| 8 | Ime Akpan | 19 | 2001 2002 |
| 9 | Darius Jackson | 17 | 2012 2013 2014 2015 |
| 10 | Andy Schmitt | 16 | 2006 2007 2008 2009 |

Single season
| Rank | Player | TDs | Year |
|---|---|---|---|
| 1 | Ime Akpan | 15 | 2002 |
| | Samson Evans | 15 | 2022 |
| 3 | Darius Jackson | 14 | 2015 |

== Receiving ==
=== Receptions ===
Career
| Rank | Player | Rec | Years |
|---|---|---|---|
| 1 | Eric Deslauriers | 248 | 2003 2004 2005 2006 |
| 2 | Hassan Beydoun | 216 | 2019 2020 2021 2022 |
| 3 | Kevin Walter | 211 | 1999 2000 2001 2002 |
| 4 | Dylan Drummond | 183 | 2018 2019 2020 2021 2022 |
| 5 | Jacory Stone | 180 | 2006 2007 2008 2009 |
| 6 | Tanner Knue | 154 | 2020 2021 2022 2023 |
| 7 | Savon Edwards | 135 | 1994 1995 1996 1997 |
| 8 | Steve Clay | 133 | 1992 1993 1994 1995 |
| 9 | Jermaine Sheffield | 126 | 1997 1998 1999 |
| | Dustin Creel | 126 | 2012 2013 2014 2015 |

Single season
| Rank | Player | Rec | Year |
|---|---|---|---|
| 1 | Hassan Beydoun | 97 | 2021 |
| 2 | Kevin Walter | 93 | 2002 |
| 3 | Jacory Stone | 88 | 2008 |
| 4 | Eric Deslauriers | 84 | 2004 |
| 5 | Kenny Christian | 78 | 2000 |
| 6 | Eric Deslauriers | 75 | 2005 |
| 7 | Tyler Jones | 75 | 2008 |
| 8 | Eric Deslauriers | 74 | 2006 |
| 9 | Dylan Drummond | 64 | 2021 |
| | Oran Singleton | 64 | 2024 |

Single game
| Rank | Player | Rec | Years | Opponent |
|---|---|---|---|---|
| 1 | Tyler Jones | 23 | 2008 | Central Michigan |
| 2 | Kenny Christian | 20 | 2000 | Temple |
| 3 | Jacory Stone | 18 | 2008 | Temple |
| 4 | Tyler Jones | 17 | 2008 | Temple |
| 5 | Ontario Pryor | 14 | 1996 | Central Michigan |
| | Kevin Walter | 14 | 2000 | Northern Illinois |
| | Eric Deslauriers | 14 | 2004 | Central Michigan |
| | Eric Deslauriers | 14 | 2005 | Western Michigan |
| | Dustin Creel | 14 | 2014 | Ball State |
| | Hassan Beydoun | 14 | 2021 | Northern Illinois |

=== Receiving yards ===
Career
| Rank | Player | Yards | Years |
|---|---|---|---|
| 1 | Eric Deslauriers | 3,250 | 2003 2004 2005 2006 |
| 2 | Kevin Walter | 2,838 | 1999 2000 2001 2002 |
| 3 | Hassan Beydoun | 2,345 | 2019 2020 2021 2022 |
| 4 | Jermaine Sheffield | 2,043 | 1997 1998 1999 |
| 5 | Dylan Drummond | 2,028 | 2018 2019 2020 2021 2022 |
| 6 | Tanner Knue | 1,866 | 2020 2021 2022 2023 |
| 7 | Jacory Stone | 1,851 | 2006 2007 2008 2009 |
| 8 | Steve Clay | 1,846 | 1992 1993 1994 1995 |
| 9 | Sergio Bailey | 1746 | 2016 2017 |
| 10 | Tom Parm | 1,711 | 1976 1977 1978 1979 |

Single season
| Rank | Player | Yards | Year |
|---|---|---|---|
| 1 | Kevin Walter | 1,368 | 2002 |
| 2 | Eric Deslauriers | 1,257 | 2004 |
| 3 | Ontario Pryor | 1,031 | 1996 |
| 4 | Hassan Beydoun | 1,015 | 2021 |
| 5 | Steve Clay | 999 | 1995 |
| 6 | Jermaine Sheffield | 953 | 1998 |
| 7 | Jacory Stone | 943 | 2008 |
| 8 | Eric Deslauriers | 898 | 2006 |
| 9 | Sergio Bailey | 878 | 2017 |
| 10 | Eric Deslauriers | 874 | 2005 |

Single game
| Rank | Player | Yards | Years | Opponent |
|---|---|---|---|---|
| 1 | Ontario Pryor | 241 | 1996 | Central Michigan |
| 2 | Kevin Walter | 225 | 2002 | Akron |
| 3 | Eric Deslauriers | 209 | 2004 | Ball State |
| 4 | Eric Deslauriers | 207 | 2004 | Central Michigan |
| 5 | Ontario Pryor | 202 | 1996 | Temple |
| 6 | Kevin Walter | 199 | 2000 | Northern Illinois |
| 7 | Kenny Christian | 198 | 2000 | Temple |
| 8 | Hassan Beydoun | 197 | 2021 | Toledo |
| 9 | Terrance Lloyd | 195 | 2001 | Akron |
| 10 | Dieuly Aristilde | 193 | 2016 | Miami (Ohio) |

=== Receiving touchdowns ===
Career
| Rank | Player | TDs | Years |
|---|---|---|---|
| 1 | Eric Deslauriers | 27 | 2003 2004 2005 2006 |
| 2 | Kevin Walter | 20 | 1999 2000 2001 2002 |
| 3 | Tanner Knue | 17 | 2020 2021 2022 2023 |
| 4 | Sergio Bailey | 16 | 2016 2017 |
| 5 | Steve Clay | 14 | 1992 1993 1994 1995 |
| | Jermaine Sheffield | 14 | 1997 1998 1999 |
| | Dylan Drummond | 14 | 2018 2019 2020 2021 2022 |
| 8 | Dick Moseley | 12 | 1951 1952 1953 1954 |
| | Arthur Jackson III | 12 | 2018 2019 |
| 10 | Nick Manych | 11 | 1952 1953 1954 |
| | Reggie Garrett | 11 | 1973 |
| | Tyreese Russell | 11 | 2011 2012 2013 2014 |
| | Dustin Creel | 11 | 2012 2013 2014 2015 |

Single season
| Rank | Player | TDs | Year |
|---|---|---|---|
| 1 | Eric Deslauriers | 13 | 2004 |
| 2 | Reggie Garrett | 11 | 1973 |
| 3 | Kevin Walter | 9 | 2002 |
| | Sergio Bailey | 9 | 2017 |
| | Tanner Knue | 9 | 2022 |
| 6 | Eric Deslauriers | 8 | 2005 |
| 7 | Steve Clay | 7 | 1995 |
| | Chris Roberson | 7 | 2002 |
| | Sergio Bailey | 7 | 2016 |
| | Arthur Jackson III | 7 | 2019 |
| | Nick Devereaux | 7 | 2025 |

Single game
| Rank | Player | TDs | Years | Opponent |
|---|---|---|---|---|
| 1 | Reggie Garrett | 4 | 1973 | Weber State |
| | Eric Deslauriers | 4 | 2004 | Central Michigan |
| 3 | Nick Manych | 3 | 1953 | Southern Illinois |
| | Don Madden | 3 | 1968 | Morningside |

== Total offense ==
Total offense is the sum of passing and rushing statistics. It does not include receiving or returns.

=== Total offense yards ===
Career
| Rank | Player | Yards | Years |
|---|---|---|---|
| 1 | Brogan Roback | 8,876 | 2013 2014 2015 2016 2017 |
| 2 | Walter Church | 8,628 | 1996 1998 1999 2000 |
| 3 | Charlie Batch | 7,715 | 1994 1995 1996 1997 |
| 4 | Alex Gillett | 6,836 | 2009 2010 2011 2012 |
| 5 | Andy Schmitt | 6,745 | 2006 2007 2008 2009 |
| 6 | Ron Adams | 5,259 | 1984 1985 1986 1987 |
| 7 | Matt Bohnet | 4,988 | 2004 2005 |
| 8 | Steve Raklovits | 3,558 | 1973 1974 1975 1976 1977 |
| 9 | Gary Patton | 3,547 | 1984 1985 1986 1987 |
| 10 | Scott Davis | 3,455 | 1978 1979 1980 1981 |

Single season
| Rank | Player | Yards | Year |
|---|---|---|---|
| 1 | Mike Glass III | 3,597 | 2019 |
| 2 | Charlie Batch | 3,390 | 1997 |
| 3 | Matt Bohnet | 3,231 | 2004 |
| 4 | Charlie Batch | 3,229 | 1995 |
| 5 | Ben Bryant | 3,078 | 2021 |
| 6 | Cole Snyder | 3,007 | 2024 |
| 7 | Noah Kim | 3,003 | 2025 |
| 8 | Brogan Roback | 2,917 | 2016 |
| 9 | Brogan Roback | 2,843 | 2017 |
| 10 | Andy Schmitt | 2,815 | 2008 |

Single game
| Rank | Player | Yards | Years | Opponent |
|---|---|---|---|---|
| 1 | Andy Schmitt | 554 | 2008 | Central Michigan |
| 2 | Reginald Bell | 510 | 2014 | Ball State |
| 3 | Brogan Roback | 509 | 2016 | Ball State |
| 4 | Andy Schmitt | 504 | 2008 | Temple |
| 5 | Charlie Batch | 469 | 1997 | Ball State |
| 6 | Charlie Batch | 466 | 1997 | Western Michigan |
| 7 | Charlie Batch | 455 | 1995 | Toledo |
| 8 | Matt Bohnet | 433 | 2005 | Central Michigan |
| 9 | Walter Church | 430 | 1998 | Western Michigan |
| 10 | Matt Bohnet | 426 | 2004 | Ball State |

=== Touchdowns responsible for ===
"Touchdowns responsible for" is the NCAA's official term for combined passing and rushing touchdowns.

Career
| Rank | Player | TDs | Years |
|---|---|---|---|
| 1 | Brogan Roback | 62 | 2013 2014 2015 2016 2017 |
| 2 | Charlie Batch | 58 | 1994 1995 1996 1997 |
| 3 | Andy Schmitt | 49 | 2006 2007 2008 2009 |
| | Alex Gillett | 49 | 2009 2010 2011 2012 |
| 5 | Mike Glass III | 47 | 2018 2019 |
| 6 | Walter Church | 46 | 1996 1998 1999 2000 |
| | Samson Evans | 46 | 2020 2021 2022 2023 |
| 8 | Matt Bohnet | 38 | 2004 2005 |
| 9 | Bob Middlekauff | 33 | 1951 1952 1953 1954 |
| 10 | Ron Adams | 32 | 1984 1985 1986 1987 |

Single season
| Rank | Player | TDs | Year |
|---|---|---|---|
| 1 | Mike Glass III | 32 | 2019 |
| 2 | Charlie Batch | 24 | 1995 |
| | Charlie Batch | 24 | 1997 |
| | Noah Kim | 24 | 2025 |
| 5 | Troy Edwards | 22 | 2002 |
| 6 | Matt Bohnet | 21 | 2004 |
| 7 | Andy Schmitt | 20 | 2007 |
| | Andy Schmitt | 20 | 2008 |
| | Brogan Roback | 20 | 2016 |
| | Brogan Roback | 20 | 2017 |
| | Preston Hutchinson | 20 | 2020 |

== Defense ==
=== Interceptions ===
Career
| Rank | Player | Ints | Years |
|---|---|---|---|
| 1 | Joe Clinton | 20 | 1966 1967 1968 1969 |
| 2 | George Harrison | 16 | 1962 1963 1964 1965 |
| 3 | Jeff Bixler | 15 | 1972 1973 1974 1975 |
| 4 | Darrell Mossburg | 14 | 1970 1971 1972 |
| 5 | Charles Gordon | 12 | 1986 1987 1988 1989 |
| | Bob Navarro | 12 | 1987 1988 1989 1990 |
| 7 | Greg Bankston | 10 | 1972 1973 1974 |
| | Tom Menard | 10 | 1985 1986 1987 1988 |
| | Richard Palmer | 10 | 1990 1991 1992 1993 |

Single season
| Rank | Player | Ints | Year |
|---|---|---|---|
| 1 | Bob Navarro | 12 | 1989 |
| 2 | Joe Clinton | 10 | 1968 |
| 3 | George Harrison | 8 | 1963 |
| 4 | Jeff Bixler | 7 | 1973 |
| | Richard Palmer | 7 | 1991 |
| 6 | Darrell Mossburg | 6 | 1971 |
| | Jeff Bixler | 6 | 1974 |
| | Terry Reed | 6 | 1997 |
| | Ryan Downard | 6 | 2007 |
| | Chris May | 6 | 2009 |

=== Tackles ===
Career
| Rank | Player | Tackles | Years |
|---|---|---|---|
| 1 | Reese McCaskill | 450 | 1992 1993 1994 1995 |
| 2 | Daniel Holtzclaw | 437 | 2005 2006 2007 2008 |
| 3 | Scott Russell | 423 | 1998 1999 2000 2001 |
| 4 | Jeff Bixler | 375 | 1972 1973 1974 1975 |
| 5 | David Marshall | 360 | 1979 1980 1981 1982 1983 |
| 6 | Kenny Philpot | 357 | 1998 1999 2000 2001 |
| 7 | Pete Kalogeras | 349 | 1968 1969 1970 |
| 8 | David Lusky | 346 | 2000 2001 2002 2003 |
| 9 | Vince Calhoun | 341 | 2016 2017 2018 2019 |
| 10 | Ron Johnson | 339 | 1974 1975 1976 1977 |

Single season
| Rank | Player | Tackles | Year |
|---|---|---|---|
| 1 | Alvin Sanders | 180 | 1974 |
| 2 | Joe Iliano | 160 | 1982 |
| 3 | Donald McCall | 156 | 1999 |
| 4 | Jim Durham | 155 | 1984 |
| 5 | Brian Karol | 155 | 1974 |
| 6 | David Lusky | 153 | 2003 |
| 7 | Mark Langkos | 150 | 1996 |
| 8 | Kevin Harrison | 146 | 2004 |
| 9 | David Lusky | 144 | 2002 |
| 10 | Pete Kalogeras | 143 | 1970 |

=== Sacks ===
Career
| Rank | Player | Sacks | Years |
|---|---|---|---|
| 1 | Jose Ramirez | 20.5 | 2020 2021 2022 |
| 2 | Pat O'Connor | 20.0 | 2012 2013 2014 2016 |
| 3 | Maxx Crosby | 19.0 | 2016 2017 2018 |
| 4 | Kevin Howe | 17.5 | 2003 2004 2005 2006 |
| 5 | Turan Rush | 17.0 | 2018 2019 2020 2021 |
| 6 | Jeremiah Harris | 16.0 | 2014 2015 2016 2017 2018 |
| 7 | Jason Jones | 14.0 | 2004 2005 2006 2007 |
| 8 | Kalonji Kashama | 12.0 | 2010 2011 2012 2013 |
| 9 | Brad Ohrman | 11.5 | 2007 2008 2009 2010 2011 |

Single season
| Rank | Player | Sacks | Year |
|---|---|---|---|
| 1 | Jose Ramirez | 12.0 | 2022 |
| 2 | Avery Brown | 11.0 | 1996 |
| | Maxx Crosby | 11.0 | 2017 |
| 4 | Kevin Howe | 10.5 | 2005 |
| 5 | Avery Brown | 10.0 | 1995 |
| 6 | Pat O'Connor | 8.5 | 2016 |
| 7 | Walter Campbell | 8.0 | 1991 |
| | Walter Campbell | 8.0 | 1992 |
| | Troy Campbell | 8.0 | 1998 |
| | Derek Vitatoe | 8.0 | 1998 |

== Kicking ==
=== Field goals made ===
Career
| Rank | Player | FGs | Years |
|---|---|---|---|
| 1 | Andrew Wellock | 69 | 2003 2004 2005 2006 |
| 2 | Chad Ryland | 56 | 2018 2019 2020 2021 |
| 3 | Jesús Gómez | 46 | 2022 2023 2024 |
| 4 | Justin Ventura | 42 | 1995 1996 1997 1998 |
| 5 | Tim Henneghan | 38 | 1986 1987 1988 1989 |
| 6 | Dylan Mulder | 35 | 2012 2013 2014 2015 |
| 7 | Toller Starnes | 34 | 1998 1999 2000 2001 |
| | Paul Fricano | 34 | 2016 2017 |
| 9 | Jim Langeloh | 22 | 1989 1990 1991 1992 |
| 10 | Joe Carithers | 20 | 2008 2009 |

Single season
| Rank | Player | FGs | Year |
|---|---|---|---|
| 1 | Andrew Wellock | 21 | 2004 |
| 2 | Jesús Gómez | 20 | 2024 |
| 3 | Paul Fricano | 19 | 2016 |
| | Chad Ryland | 19 | 2021 |
| 5 | Andrew Wellock | 18 | 2005 |
| 6 | Toller Starnes | 17 | 1999 |
| | Rudy Kessinger | 17 | 2025 |
| 8 | Tim Henneghan | 16 | 1989 |
| | Andrew Wellock | 16 | 2006 |
| 10 | Paul Fricano | 15 | 2017 |

Single game
| Rank | Player | FGs | Years | Opponent |
|---|---|---|---|---|
| 1 | Chad Ryland | 5 | 2021 | Western Michigan |
| 2 | Craig Motzer | 4 | 1977 | Northern Illinois |
| | Tim Henneghan | 4 | 1989 | Western Michigan |
| | Jim Langeloh | 4 | 1990 | Central Michigan |
| | Toller Starnes | 4 | 1999 | Central Michigan |
| | Andrew Wellock | 4 | 2003 | Western Illinois |
| | Andrew Wellock | 4 | 2004 | Central Michigan |
| | Andrew Wellock | 4 | 2005 | Ball State |
| | Chad Ryland | 4 | 2020 | Western Michigan |
| | Rudy Kessinger | 4 | 2026 | Akron |
