= Walter Church =

Walter Church may refer to:

- Walter G. Church Sr., member of the North Carolina General Assembly
- Walter Church (American football), American football quarterback
- Walter Church (Australian politician) (1829–1901), New South Wales politician
