= 2008 Eastern Michigan Eagles football team =

American college football season

2008 Eastern Michigan Eagles football
- Conference: Mid-American Conference
- West
- Record: 3–9 (2–6 MAC)
- Head coach: Jeff Genyk (5th season)
- Offensive coordinator: Scott Isphording (2nd season)
- Home stadium: Rynearson Stadium

2008 Mid-American Conference football standings
| | Conf. | | | Overall |
| Team | W | | L | W | | L |
|---|---|---|---|---|---|---|
East Division
| Buffalo x$ | 5 | – | 3 | 8 | – | 6 |
| Bowling Green | 4 | – | 4 | 6 | – | 6 |
| Temple | 4 | – | 4 | 5 | – | 7 |
| Ohio | 3 | – | 5 | 4 | – | 8 |
| Akron | 3 | – | 5 | 5 | – | 7 |
| Kent State | 3 | – | 5 | 4 | – | 8 |
| Miami (OH) | 1 | – | 7 | 2 | – | 10 |
West Division
| Ball State x | 8 | – | 0 | 12 | – | 2 |
| Central Michigan | 6 | – | 2 | 8 | – | 5 |
| Western Michigan | 6 | – | 2 | 9 | – | 4 |
| Northern Illinois | 5 | – | 3 | 6 | – | 7 |
| Toledo | 2 | – | 6 | 3 | – | 9 |
| Eastern Michigan | 2 | – | 6 | 3 | – | 9 |
Championship: Buffalo 42, Ball State 24
$ – Conference champion; x – Division champion/co-champions

The 2008 Eastern Michigan Eagles football team represented Eastern Michigan University during the 2008 NCAA Division I FBS football season. Eastern Michigan competed as a member of the Mid-American Conference. The team was led by head coach Jeff Genyk, who was released at the end of the season. He was replaced by Ron English.

2008 started with a bang in a 52–0 defeat of Indiana State. For longtime fans, this was repayment for an embarrassing loss to ISU in 2001. Despite the strong start, Eastern lost 4 straight after the opener, and was never close in any of them. Then they pulled off a road upset of Bowling Green, who had beaten BCS member Pittsburgh earlier in the year. But after that, they had two close losses by three at West Point to Army, and by seven at home to Akron.

After a loss to Temple on November 22, 2008, Eastern Michigan fired coach Jeff Genyk, but would allow him to coach the Eagle's final game of the season against rival Central Michigan. Many games lost by 7 points or less was one of the reasons given for firing Genyk. Eastern won that game, however, 56–52. Two national records were set against CMU as QB Andy Schmitt had 58 completions and Tyler Jones tied a record by catching 23 passes. With Eastern Michigan's win over Central Michigan, all three schools split the series, and Eastern retained the Michigan MAC Trophy on the tie. Schmitt finished 58/80 for 516 yards (school record), threw 5 TDs, and ran for one more. Most of these records were reset from just the week prior against Temple. In that game, Schmitt finished 50/76 for 485 yards, but Eastern was outscored by three. His 76 passes in a game without an interception set an NCAA record. He was only intercepted once against Central with 80 passes.

Schmitt's return as a 5th year senior in 2009 was a point of optimism for fans. For those two games he was 108/156 for 1001 yards and 1 interception. Perhaps the 2009 season would have been much different (instead of 0–12) if Schmitt had not gone down with a career-ending knee injury early in that season.

== Schedule ==
| Date | Time | Opponent | Site | TV | Result | Attendance |
|---|---|---|---|---|---|---|
| August 28 | 7:00 pm | Indiana State* | Rynearson Stadium; Ypsilanti, MI | | W 52–0 | 17,494 |
| September 6 | 12:00 pm | at Michigan State* | Spartan Stadium; East Lansing, MI | BTN | L 10–42 | 71,789 |
| September 13 | 12:00 pm | Toledo | Rynearson Stadium; Ypsilanti, MI | | L 17–41 | 16,860 |
| September 20 | 1:00 pm | at Maryland* | Byrd Stadium; College Park, MD | | L 24–51 | 48,023 |
| September 27 | 12:00 pm | Northern Illinois | Rynearson Stadium; Ypsilanti, MI | ESPN+ | L 0–37 | 17,159 |
| October 4 | 4:00 pm | at Bowling Green | Doyt Perry Stadium; Bowling Green, OH | | W 24–21 | 16,217 |
| October 11 | 1:00 pm | at Army* | Michie Stadium; West Point, NY | ESPN Classic | L 13–17 | 27,096 |
| October 18 | 1:00 pm | Akron | Rynearson Stadium; Ypsilanti, MI | | L 35–42 | 17,055 |
| October 25 | 12:00 pm | at No. 20 Ball State | Scheumann Stadium; Muncie, IN | | L 16–38 | 20,948 |
| November 1 | 2:00 pm | at Western Michigan | Waldo Stadium; Kalamazoo, MI (Michigan MAC Trophy) | | L 10–31 | 19,917 |
| November 22 | 1:00 pm | at Temple | Lincoln Financial Field; Philadelphia, PA | | L 52–55 | 13,033 |
| November 28 | 12:00 pm | Central Michigan | Rynearson Stadium; Ypsilanti, MI (rivalry) | | W 56–52 | 26,188 |
*Non-conference game; Rankings from AP Poll released prior to the game; All times are in Eastern time

== Game summaries ==
=== Indiana State ===
| | 1 | 2 | 3 | 4 | Total |
|---|---|---|---|---|---|
| Indiana State | 0 | 0 | 0 | 0 | 0 |
| Eastern Michigan | 14 | 14 | 14 | 0 | 42 |

=== Michigan State ===
| | 1 | 2 | 3 | 4 | Total |
|---|---|---|---|---|---|
| Eastern Michigan | 0 | 7 | 0 | 3 | 10 |
| Michigan State | 7 | 14 | 7 | 14 | 42 |

=== Toledo ===
| | 1 | 2 | 3 | 4 | Total |
|---|---|---|---|---|---|
| Toledo | 14 | 0 | 27 | 0 | 41 |
| Eastern Michigan | 0 | 7 | 0 | 10 | 17 |

=== Maryland ===
| | 1 | 2 | 3 | 4 | Total |
|---|---|---|---|---|---|
| Eastern Michigan | 0 | 14 | 3 | 7 | 24 |
| Maryland | 10 | 14 | 10 | 17 | 51 |

=== Northern Illinois ===
| | 1 | 2 | 3 | 4 | Total |
|---|---|---|---|---|---|
| Northern Illinois | 14 | 7 | 7 | 9 | 37 |
| Eastern Michigan | 0 | 0 | 0 | 0 | 0 |

=== Bowling Green ===
| | 1 | 2 | 3 | 4 | Total |
|---|---|---|---|---|---|
| Eastern Michigan | 0 | 7 | 10 | 7 | 24 |
| Bowling Green | 7 | 0 | 7 | 7 | 21 |

=== Army ===
| | 1 | 2 | 3 | 4 | Total |
|---|---|---|---|---|---|
| Eastern Michigan | 0 | 13 | 0 | 0 | 13 |
| Army | 7 | 0 | 3 | 7 | 17 |

=== Akron ===
| | 1 | 2 | 3 | 4 | Total |
|---|---|---|---|---|---|
| Akron | 3 | 21 | 7 | 11 | 42 |
| Eastern Michigan | 0 | 14 | 7 | 14 | 35 |

=== Ball State ===
| | 1 | 2 | 3 | 4 | Total |
|---|---|---|---|---|---|
| Eastern Michigan | 0 | 0 | 7 | 9 | 16 |
| Ball State | 3 | 7 | 14 | 14 | 38 |

=== Western Michigan ===
| | 1 | 2 | 3 | 4 | Total |
|---|---|---|---|---|---|
| Eastern Michigan | 0 | 7 | 3 | 0 | 10 |
| Western Michigan | 10 | 7 | 0 | 14 | 31 |

=== Temple ===
| | 1 | 2 | 3 | 4 | Total |
|---|---|---|---|---|---|
| Eastern Michigan | 7 | 14 | 3 | 28 | 52 |
| Temple | 3 | 21 | 10 | 21 | 55 |

=== Central Michigan ===
| | 1 | 2 | 3 | 4 | Total |
|---|---|---|---|---|---|
| Central Michigan | 14 | 21 | 10 | 7 | 52 |
| Eastern Michigan | 14 | 28 | 14 | 0 | 56 |

== After the season ==
The following Eagle was selected in the 2009 NFL draft after the season.

| Round | Pick | Player | Position | NFL club |
|---|---|---|---|---|
| 4 | 109 | T. J. Lang | Tackle | Green Bay Packers |
