= 1986 Kent State Golden Flashes football team =

American college football season

1986 Kent State Golden Flashes football
- Conference: Mid-American Conference
- Record: 5–6 (5–3 MAC)
- Head coach: Glen Mason (1st season)
- Home stadium: Dix Stadium

1986 Mid-American Conference football standings
	Conf.					Overall
Team	W		L		T	W		L		T
Miami (OH) $	6	–	2	–	0	8	–	4	–	0
Toledo	5	–	3	–	0	7	–	4	–	0
Bowling Green	5	–	3	–	0	5	–	6	–	0
Kent State	5	–	3	–	0	5	–	6	–	0
Ball State	4	–	4	–	0	6	–	5	–	0
Eastern Michigan	4	–	4	–	0	6	–	5	–	0
Central Michigan	4	–	4	–	0	5	–	5	–	0
Western Michigan	3	–	5	–	0	3	–	8	–	0
Ohio	0	–	8	–	0	1	–	10	–	0
$ – Conference champion

The 1986 Kent State Golden Flashes football team was an American football team that represented Kent State University in the Mid-American Conference (MAC) during the 1986 NCAA Division I-A football season. In their first season under head coach Glen Mason, the Golden Flashes compiled a 5–6 record (5–3 against MAC opponents), finished in a tie for second place in the MAC, and were outscored by all opponents by a combined total of 288 to 179.

The team's statistical leaders included Patrick Young with 779 rushing yards and 756 passing yards, and Eric Dye with 425 receiving yards. Defensive back Stuart Sims was selected as a first-team All-MAC player.

== Schedule ==
Date	Opponent	Site	Result	Attendance	Source
September 6	Toledo	Dix Stadium; Kent, OH	W 18–16	10,200	
September 13	Akron*	Dix Stadium; Kent, OH (Wagon Wheel)	L 7–17	19,000	
September 20	at Kentucky*	Commonwealth Stadium; Lexington, KY	L 12–37	54,865	
September 27	at Eastern Michigan	Rynearson Stadium; Ypsilanti, MI	W 20–16	18,764	
October 4	Central Michigan	Dix Stadium; Kent, OH	W 33–30		
October 11	at Florida*	Florida Field; Gainesville, FL	L 9–52	73,718	
October 18	at Ball State	Ball State Stadium; Muncie, IN	L 17–26	11,220	
October 25	Bowling Green	Dix Stadium; Kent, OH (Anniversary Award)	L 15–31	13,000	
November 1	at Ohio	Peden Stadium; Athens, OH	W 17–13		
November 8	Miami (OH)	Dix Stadium; Kent, OH	W 24–23	11,500	
November 15	at Western Michigan	Waldo Stadium; Kalamazoo, MI	L 7–27		
*Non-conference game
