= 1986 Central Michigan Chippewas football team =

American college football season

1986 Central Michigan Chippewas football
- Conference: Mid-American Conference
- Record: 5–5 (4–4 MAC)
- Head coach: Herb Deromedi (9th season)
- MVP: Rick Poljan
- Home stadium: Kelly/Shorts Stadium

1986 Mid-American Conference football standings
	Conf.					Overall
Team	W		L		T	W		L		T
Miami (OH) $	6	–	2	–	0	8	–	4	–	0
Toledo	5	–	3	–	0	7	–	4	–	0
Bowling Green	5	–	3	–	0	5	–	6	–	0
Kent State	5	–	3	–	0	5	–	6	–	0
Ball State	4	–	4	–	0	6	–	5	–	0
Eastern Michigan	4	–	4	–	0	6	–	5	–	0
Central Michigan	4	–	4	–	0	5	–	5	–	0
Western Michigan	3	–	5	–	0	3	–	8	–	0
Ohio	0	–	8	–	0	1	–	10	–	0
$ – Conference champion

The 1986 Central Michigan Chippewas football team represented Central Michigan University in the Mid-American Conference (MAC) during the 1986 NCAA Division I-A football season. In their ninth season under head coach Herb Deromedi, the Chippewas compiled a 5–5 record (4–4 against MAC opponents), finished in a tie for fifth place in the MAC standings, and were outscored by their opponents, 284 to 258. The team played its home games in Kelly/Shorts Stadium in Mount Pleasant, Michigan, with attendance of 118,457 in five home games.

The team's statistical leaders included quarterback Marcelle Carruthers with 912 passing yards, Rodney Stevenson with 1,104 rushing yards, and Melvin Houston with 210 receiving yards. Offensive guard Rick Poljan received the team's most valuable player award. Three Central Michigan players (offensive tackle Brian Williams, offensive guard Rick Poljan, and running back Rodney Stevenson) received first-team All-MAC honors.

== Schedule ==
Date	Opponent	Site	Result	Attendance	Source
September 13	Idaho*	Kelly/Shorts Stadium; Mount Pleasant, MI	W 34–21	18,201	
September 20	Bowling Green	Kelly/Shorts Stadium; Mount Pleasant, MI	W 20–10	17,568	
September 27	Ohio	Kelly/Shorts Stadium; Mount Pleasant, MI	W 56–27		
October 4	at Kent State	Dix Stadium; Kent, OH	L 30–33		
October 11	Western Michigan	Kelly/Shorts Stadium; Mount Pleasant, MI (rivalry)	W 18–10		
October 18	at Tulsa*	Skelly Field; Tulsa, OK	L 6–42	10,876	
October 25	at Eastern Michigan	Rynearson Stadium; Ypsilanti, MI (rivalry)	L 16–34		
November 1	at Miami (OH)	Yager Stadium; Oxford, OH	L 21–59	27,840	
November 8	Toledo	Kelly/Shorts Stadium; Mount Pleasant, MI	L 14–26		
November 15	Ball State	Kelly/Shorts Stadium; Mount Pleasant, MI	W 43–22		
*Non-conference game
