= 1986 Bowling Green Falcons football team =

American college football season

1986 Bowling Green Falcons football
- Conference: Mid-American Conference
- Record: 5–6 (5–3 MAC)
- Head coach: Moe Ankney (1st season)
- Defensive coordinator: Bob Wolfe (1st season)
- Home stadium: Doyt Perry Stadium

1986 Mid-American Conference football standings
	Conf.					Overall
Team	W		L		T	W		L		T
Miami (OH) $	6	–	2	–	0	8	–	4	–	0
Toledo	5	–	3	–	0	7	–	4	–	0
Bowling Green	5	–	3	–	0	5	–	6	–	0
Kent State	5	–	3	–	0	5	–	6	–	0
Ball State	4	–	4	–	0	6	–	5	–	0
Eastern Michigan	4	–	4	–	0	6	–	5	–	0
Central Michigan	4	–	4	–	0	5	–	5	–	0
Western Michigan	3	–	5	–	0	3	–	8	–	0
Ohio	0	–	8	–	0	1	–	10	–	0
$ – Conference champion

The 1986 Bowling Green Falcons football team was an American football team that represented Bowling Green University in the Mid-American Conference (MAC) during the 1986 NCAA Division I-A football season. In their first season under head coach Moe Ankney, the Falcons compiled a 5–6 record (5–3 against MAC opponents), finished in a tie for second place in the MAC, and were outscored by all opponents by a combined total of 222 to 148.

The team's statistical leaders included Rich Dackin with 1,197 passing yards, Jeff Davis with 782 rushing yards, and Ronald Heard with 359 receiving yards.

== Schedule ==
Date	Opponent	Site	Result	Attendance	Source
September 6	Ohio	Doyt Perry Stadium; Bowling Green, OH	W 21–16		
September 13	at Minnesota*	Metrodome; Minneapolis, MN	L 7–31	51,317	
September 20	at Central Michigan	Kelly/Shorts Stadium; Mount Pleasant, MI	L 10–20	17,568	
September 27	at Miami (OH)	Yager Stadium; Oxford, OH	L 7–24	24,056	
October 4	Western Michigan	Doyt Perry Stadium; Bowling Green, OH	W 17–3	9,010	
October 11	Eastern Michigan	Doyt Perry Stadium; Bowling Green, OH	W 24–10	17,212	
October 18	at No. 9 Washington*	Husky Stadium; Seattle, WA	L 0–48	57,075	
October 25	at Kent State	Dix Stadium; Kent, OH (Anniversary Award)	W 31–15	13,000	
November 1	Northern Illinois*	Doyt Perry Stadium; Bowling Green, OH	L 8–16	10,102	
November 8	Ball State	Doyt Perry Stadium; Bowling Green, OH	W 20–17	20,104	
November 15	at Toledo	Glass Bowl; Toledo, OH (rivalryy)	L 3–22	22,226	
*Non-conference game; Rankings from AP Poll released prior to the game
