= 2012 MAC Championship Game =

2012 Marathon MAC Championship Game
- Conference Championship
- 2012 MAC Championship Game logo
Northern Illinois Huskies	Kent State Golden Flashes
(11–1)	(11–1)
44	37
Head coach: Dave Doeren	Head coach: Darrell Hazell
AP / Coaches / BCS; 19 / 18 / 21	AP / Coaches / BCS; 18 / 19 / 17
	1	2	3	4	OT	2OT	Total
Northern Illinois	3	14	10	7	3	7	44
Kent State	10	0	3	21	3	0	37
- Date: November 30, 2012
- Season: 2012
- Stadium: Ford Field
- Location: Detroit, Michigan
- MVP: Jordan Lynch (QB, NIU)
- Favorite: Northern Illinois by 5
- Referee: Don Willard
- Attendance: 18,132

United States TV coverage
- Network: ESPN2
- Announcers: Carter Blackburn (play-by-play); Rod Gilmore (analysis); Jemele Hill (sideline)

2012 Mid-American Conference football standings
	Conf.			Overall
Team	W		L	W		L
East Division
Kent State x	8	–	0	11	–	3
Bowling Green	6	–	2	8	–	5
Ohio	4	–	4	9	–	4
Buffalo	3	–	5	4	–	8
Miami (OH)	3	–	5	4	–	8
UMass	1	–	7	1	–	11
Akron	0	–	8	1	–	11
West Division
No. 22 Northern Illinois x$	8	–	0	12	–	2
Toledo	6	–	2	9	–	4
Ball State	6	–	2	9	–	4
Central Michigan	4	–	4	7	–	6
Western Michigan	2	–	6	4	–	8
Eastern Michigan	1	–	7	2	–	10
Championship: Northern Illinois 44, Kent State 37
$ – Conference champion and BCS representative as top non-AQ school to meet automatic qualification criteria; x – Division champion/co-champions; UMass not eligible for conference title or bowl game as part of FBS transition; Rankings from AP Poll

The 2012 Marathon MAC Championship Game was an American football game held on November 30, 2012, at Ford Field in Detroit, Michigan between the West Division champion Northern Illinois Huskies and the East Division champion Kent State Golden Flashes to determine the Mid-American Conference (MAC) champion. This is the first time since 2003 that both teams entered the game ranked in the BCS standings, AP Poll, and Coaches' Poll.

The pre-game buildup focused primarily on the two high-powered offenses, both of which were led by strong rushing attacks. The rushing attacks differed; Northern Illinois' was led by junior quarterback Jordan Lynch, who finished fourth in the nation in rushing, while Kent State's was led by a running back tandem consisting of Dri Archer and Trayion Durham. The opening line favored Northern Illinois by seven points. After being tied at the end of regulation, the game went into two overtime periods and eventually concluded with Northern Illinois winning 44–37. The Huskies were subsequently invited to the 2013 Orange Bowl.

== Potential BCS implications ==
Multiple media outlets speculated that if Kent State won, it could earn a BCS bowl bid. Under then-current BCS rules, the highest-ranked team from outside the six "AQ" conferences received an automatic at-large BCS bid if it was (1) in the top 16 of the final BCS rankings and (2) ranked higher than at least one champion of an AQ conference.

Kent State had entered the weekend of November 24 ranked 23rd in the BCS standings, but after every team ranked between 15 and 21 lost that day, the Golden Flashes rose to 17th in the November 25 rankings, with Northern Illinois rising to 21st. At the same time, no team from the Big East, which had an automatic place in a BCS bowl, was in the top 25. The teams ranked immediately ahead and behind Kent State, UCLA and Texas, had to play higher-ranked teams on the road during the championship weekend. UCLA visited 8th ranked Stanford in the Pac-12 Championship Game, and Texas visited sixth-ranked Kansas State to end both teams' regular seasons. Because of Northern Illinois' ranking entering the game, it had not been initially thought that the Huskies would be able to jump into the top 16 with a win, even with losses by UCLA and Texas.

Both UCLA and Texas would lose their respective games; also, Nebraska, which had entered the Big Ten Championship Game at No. 12 in the BCS, was blown out 70–31 by a Wisconsin team that entered the game at 7–5. All of this opened the door for the winner of the MAC game to enter the top 16. Northern Illinois won and vaulted to #15 in the BCS Standings, earning a spot in the 2013 Orange Bowl. The berth was the first ever for a MAC team in a BCS game, and was also the first BCS berth ever for a one-loss non-AQ team.

Kent State was invited to the GoDaddy.com Bowl, their first bowl game appearance since the 1972 Tangerine Bowl.

== Pre-game buildup ==
=== Northern Illinois ===
==== Offense ====
Northern Illinois finished tenth in the nation in total offense, finishing the season with 6,574 total yards. Their success can largely be attributed to their star quarterback, junior Jordan Lynch, who achieved first-team all-MAC honors and was named the MAC Offensive Player of the Year. He finished in the top-30 nationally in passing yards, touchdowns, completion percentage, and passer rating. Perhaps Lynch's best contribution, however, was in the rushing game, where he amassed 1815 yards which was fourth in the country, and best among quarterbacks. Two other running backs, both juniors, made contributions in the rushing game as well: Leighton Settle and Akeem Daniels. His leading receiver was senior Martel Moore who, during the season, became the first Northern Illinois receiver to surpass 1,000 yards receiving since 2005, and led the team with 75 receptions for 1,083 yards. The Huskies' offensive line was anchored by left tackle Tyler Loos, who achieved second-team all-conference accolades.

==== Defense ====
Coordinated by Jay Niemann, the Huskies' defense was led by linemen Alan Baxter and Sean Progar, who totaled 9.5 and 8.5 sacks respectively, as well as defensive back Jimmie Ward, all of whom achieved all-conference honors. Northern Illinois finished tied for tenth in the country with 38 sacks on the season. In total, Northern Illinois gave up 19.9 points, ranking 21st in the country.

=== Kent State ===
==== Offense ====
Kent State was led primarily by junior running back Dri Archer, who achieved first team all-MAC accolades. Archer, who is 5'8" (1.73 m) and 164 pounds (74 kg), totaled 1429 yards and 16 touchdowns, both of which ranked in the top-20 in the FBS. Archer was described by SBNation.com's Mike Breese as a "dynamic do-it-all performer". Kent State's other first-team all-conference performer was senior offensive guard Brian Winters. The Golden Flashes' quarterback was senior Spencer Keith, who threw 12 touchdowns and 10 interceptions in total. Their potent rushing attack had an additional member, Trayion Durham, who achieved third-team all-MAC by rushing for 1316 rushing yards and 14 touchdowns on the season. The Golden Flashes' leading receiver was also Archer. Their leading wide receiver was a freshman, Josh Boyle.

==== Defense ====
Despite a lackluster performance throughout the season in terms of total defense (where they finished 74th) and scoring defense (where they finished 44th), they did create the second-most turnovers in the country with 38 which trailed only Oregon. From an individual perspective, junior safety Luke Wollet led the team with four interceptions and achieved second-team all-MAC honors. For the third consecutive season, defensive lineman Roosevelt Nix achieved first-team all-conference honors. During the season, he totaled 6 sacks as well as 15 tackles for loss.

== Game summary ==
=== Game notes ===
==== First quarter ====
Northern Illinois got the ball to start the game and, after three plays totaling three yards, were forced to punt, going three-and-out. Kent State's first drive also resulted in a three-and-out. The Huskies took over at their own 14 on the ensuing drive and managed to achieve one first down prior to having to punt. The first scoring drive occurred for the Golden Flashes on their second drive, but they were aided by Huskies' punt returner Angelo Sebastiano fumbling a Kent State punt. They took advantage of the mistake and ultimately scored on a 15-yard touchdown run by Dri Archer. After the Huskies failed to score on their next drive, Kent State capitalized again on a 37-yard field goal by Freddy Cortez. The final drive of the first quarter lasted 14 plays for 65 yards and ended in a Mathew Sims 27-yard field goal.

==== Second quarter ====
Kent State went three-and-out on their first drive of the second quarter. Northern Illinois' ensuing drive capitalized on their strong field position (their own 41-yard line) by executing a 6-play, 59-yard drive that culminated in a 14-yard pass from Jordan Lynch to Martel Moore that tied the game at 10. Kent State committed another miscue on their next drive, throwing an interception to Dechane Durante. Northern Illinois again capitalized, this time with a 12-play, 58-yard drive culminating with a 1-yard rush by Akeem Daniels. That drive would be the final scoring drive of the half, at which the score was Northern Illinois Huskies 17, Kent State Golden Flashes 10.

==== Third quarter ====
Since NIU got the ball to start the game, Kent State got it to start the second half and got the ball at their own 47 after a 28-yard return by Josh Boyle. Kent State got the ball into the red zone, but ultimately settled for a field goal which cut NIU's lead to 4 points. Northern Illinois' prolific offense continued their scoring by executing a 10-play, 75-yard drive highlighted by a 44-yard run by Lynch on a 4th and 1. Lynch would run it into the end zone for a 1-yard touchdown three plays later. After the Golden Flashes went three-and-out, the Huskies scored, this time via a 29-yard field goal by Sims.

==== Fourth quarter ====
After Kent State turned the ball over on downs, Northern Illinois, for the first time in the second half, did not score and punted the ball away. Kent State began a comeback on their ensuing drive via a 5-yard touchdown drive Spencer Keith, making the score 27–20. Northern Illinois' next drive lasted only one play, a fumble by Jordan Lynch that was returned by Kent State defender Zack Hitchens for a touchdown. After Cortez made the extra point, the game was tied at 27. The Huskies got back on track by scoring a touchdown, a 9-yard run by Lynch, but the Golden Flashes responded with one of their own, a 19-yard pass from Keith to Tim Erjavec. At the end of regulation, the score was tied at 34.

==== Overtime ====
Per NCAA overtime rules, each team got the ball at their own 25-yard line for one drive. In the first overtime period, Kent State got the ball down to the NIU 5 before kicking a 33-yard field goal. Northern Illinois responded with a field goal of their own, a 40-yarder by Sims. After the first overtime, the score was tied at 37. NIU got the ball to start the second overtime, and took only two plays to score a touchdown: a 23-yard run by Akeem Daniels followed by a 2-yard run by Lynch, his third touchdown of the game. Kent State then had to score a touchdown in order to force the game to a third overtime. They were unsuccessful in doing so, however, as on 4th and 8, Keith threw an interception, thus ending the game with the Northern Illinois Huskies victorious by a score of 44–37.

=== Scoring ===
==== First quarter ====
- KSU: Dri Archer, 15-yard run, (Freddy Cortez kick), 8:57 Drive: 3 plays, 22 yards; KSU 7-0
- KSU: Freddy Cortez, 37-yard field goal, 5:06 Drive: 6 plays, 16 yards; KSU 10-0
- NIU: Mathew Sims, 27-yard field goal, 0:14 Drive: 14 plays, 65 yards; KSU 10-3

==== Second quarter ====
- NIU: Martel Moore, 14-yard pass from Jordan Lynch, (Mathew Sims kick), 11:03 Drive: 6 plays, 59 yards; TIE 10-10
- NIU: Akeem Daniels, 1-yard run (Mathew Sims kick), 5:53 Drive: 12 plays, 58 yards; NIU 17-10

==== Third quarter ====
- KSU: Freddy Cortez, 24-yard field goal, 10:46 Drive: 8 plays, 46 yards; NIU 17-13
- NIU: Jordan Lynch, 1-yard run (Mathew Sims kick), 7:26 Drive: 10 plays, 75 yards; NIU 24-13
- NIU: Mathew Sims, 29-yard field goal, 2:38 Drive: 9 plays, 43 yards; NIU 27-13

==== Fourth quarter ====
- KSU: Spencer Keith, 5-yard run (Freddy Cortez kick), 4:53 Drive: 8 plays, 96 yards; KSU 27-20
- KSU: Zack Hitchens, 22-yard fumble return (Freddy Cortez kick), 4:38; TIE 27-27
- NIU: Jordan Lynch, 9-yard run (Mathew Sims kick), 3:12 Drive: 4 plays, 75 yards; NIU 34-27
- KSU: Tim Erjavec, 19-yard pass from Spencer Keith (Freddy Cortez kick), 0:44 Drive: 11 plays, 58 yards; TIE 34-34

==== First overtime ====
- KSU: Freddy Cortez, 33-yard field goal, Drive: 7 plays, 9 yards; KSU 37-34
- NIU: Mathew Sims, 40-yard field goal, Drive: 4 plays, 2 yards; TIE 37-37

==== Second overtime ====
- NIU: Jordan Lynch, 2-yard run (Mathew Sims kick), Drive: 2 plays, 25 yards; NIU 44-37

=== Individual statistics ===
==== Passing ====
Team	Name	Comp./Att.	Yards	Touchdowns	Interceptions
NIU	Jordan Lynch	19/34	212	1	1
KSU	Spencer Keith	15/36	190	1	2

==== Rushing ====
Team	Name	Rushes	Yards	Touchdowns
NIU	Jordan Lynch	36	160	3
NIU	Akeem Daniels	17	128	1
KSU	Trayion Durham	20	72	0
KSU	Dri Archer	12	15	1

==== Receiving ====
Team	Name	Receptions	Yards	Touchdowns
NIU	Akeem Daniels	4	67	0
NIU	Martel Moore	4	39	1
NIU	Perez Ashford	4	38	0
KSU	Dri Archer	5	81	0
KSU	Chris Humphrey	3	36	0
KSU	Tim Erjavec	3	29	1
