= 2012 Bowling Green Falcons football team =

American college football season

2012 Bowling Green Falcons football

Military Bowl vs. San Jose State, L 20–29
- Conference: Mid-American Conference
- East Division
- Record: 8–5 (6–2 MAC)
- Head coach: Dave Clawson (4th season)
- Offensive coordinator: Warren Ruggiero (4th season)
- Defensive coordinator: Mike Elko
- Home stadium: Doyt Perry Stadium

2012 Mid-American Conference football standings
	Conf.			Overall
Team	W		L	W		L
East Division
Kent State x	8	–	0	11	–	3
Bowling Green	6	–	2	8	–	5
Ohio	4	–	4	9	–	4
Buffalo	3	–	5	4	–	8
Miami (OH)	3	–	5	4	–	8
UMass	1	–	7	1	–	11
Akron	0	–	8	1	–	11
West Division
No. 22 Northern Illinois x$	8	–	0	12	–	2
Toledo	6	–	2	9	–	4
Ball State	6	–	2	9	–	4
Central Michigan	4	–	4	7	–	6
Western Michigan	2	–	6	4	–	8
Eastern Michigan	1	–	7	2	–	10
Championship: Northern Illinois 44, Kent State 37
$ – Conference champion and BCS representative as top non-AQ school to meet automatic qualification criteria; x – Division champion/co-champions; UMass not eligible for conference title or bowl game as part of FBS transition; Rankings from AP Poll

The 2012 Bowling Green Falcons football team represented Bowling Green State University in the 2012 NCAA Division I FBS football season. They were led by fourth year head coach Dave Clawson and played their home games at Doyt Perry Stadium. They were a member of the East Division of the Mid-American Conference. They finished the season 8–5, 6–2 in MAC play to finish in second place in the East Division. They were invited to the Military Bowl where they were defeated by San Jose State.

== Schedule ==
Date	Time	Opponent	Site	TV	Result	Attendance
September 1	3:30 pm	at No. 23 Florida*	Ben Hill Griffin Stadium; Gainesville, FL	ESPN	L 14–27	84,704
September 8	7:00 pm	Idaho*	Doyt Perry Stadium; Bowling Green, OH	BCSN	W 21–13	16,591
September 15	7:00 pm	at Toledo	Glass Bowl; Toledo, OH (Battle of I-75)	ESPN3	L 15–27	28,115
September 22	12:00 pm	at Virginia Tech*	Lane Stadium; Blacksburg, VA	ESPNU	L 0–37	65,632
September 29	3:30 pm	Rhode Island*	Doyt Perry Stadium; Bowling Green, OH	BCSN	W 48–8	15,338
October 6	2:00 pm	at Akron	InfoCision Stadium; Akron, OH		W 24–10	10,102
October 13	3:30 pm	Miami (OH)	Doyt Perry Stadium; Bowling Green, OH	BCSN	W 37–12	17,071
October 20	12:00 pm	at UMass	Gillette Stadium; Foxborough, MA		W 24–0	10,846
October 27	3:30 pm	Eastern Michigan	Doyt Perry Stadium; Bowling Green, OH	BCSN	W 24–3	13,158
November 7	8:00 pm	at Ohio	Peden Stadium; Athens, OH	ESPN2	W 26–14	19,122
November 17	12:00 pm	No. 25 Kent State	Doyt Perry Stadium; Bowling Green, OH (Battle for the Anniversary Award)	ESPN+	L 24–31	16,002
November 23	2:00 pm	vs. Buffalo	Columbus Crew Stadium; Columbus, OH	ESPN3	W 21–7	11,846
December 27	3:00 pm	vs. No. 24 San Jose State*	RFK Stadium; Washington DC (Military Bowl)	ESPN	L 20–29	17,835
*Non-conference game; Rankings from Coaches' Poll released prior to the game; All times are in Eastern time

== Game summaries ==
=== @ Florida ===
	1	2	3	4	Total
Falcons	7	0	7	0	14
#23 Gators	0	14	3	10	27

=== Idaho ===
	1	2	3	4	Total
Vandals	0	6	0	7	13
Falcons	7	0	14	0	21

=== @ Toledo ===
	1	2	3	4	Total
Falcons	0	3	6	6	15
Rockets	7	10	7	3	27

=== @ Virginia Tech ===
	1	2	3	4	Total
Falcons	0	0	0	0	0
Hokies	0	21	6	10	37

=== Rhode Island ===
	1	2	3	4	Total
Rams	0	8	0	0	8
Falcons	13	21	7	7	48

=== @ Akron ===
	1	2	3	4	Total
Falcons	0	0	17	7	24
Zips	0	10	0	0	10

=== Miami (OH) ===
	1	2	3	4	Total
RedHawks	3	3	6	0	12
Falcons	7	10	14	6	37

=== @ Massachusetts ===
	1	2	3	4	Total
Falcons	7	0	14	3	24
Minutemen	0	0	0	0	0

=== Eastern Michigan ===
	1	2	3	4	Total
Eagles	3	0	0	0	3
Falcons	14	0	7	3	24

=== @ Ohio ===
	1	2	3	4	Total
Falcons	0	19	0	7	26
Bobcats	7	0	7	0	14

=== Kent State ===
	1	2	3	4	Total
#25 Golden Flashes	0	10	7	14	31
Falcons	0	10	7	7	24

=== vs Buffalo ===
	1	2	3	4	Total
Bulls	0	0	0	7	7
Falcons	0	14	7	0	21

=== San Jose State–Military Bowl ===
	1	2	3	4	Total
#24 Spartans	7	3	9	10	29
Falcons	3	3	7	7	20
