= 1986 Ohio Bobcats football team =

American college football season

1986 Ohio Bobcats football
- Conference: Mid-American Conference
- Record: 1–10 (0–8 MAC)
- Head coach: Cleve Bryant (2nd season)
- Offensive coordinator: Bob Wylie (2nd season)
- Defensive coordinator: Tom Hollman (2nd season)
- Home stadium: Peden Stadium

1986 Mid-American Conference football standings
	Conf.					Overall
Team	W		L		T	W		L		T
Miami (OH) $	6	–	2	–	0	8	–	4	–	0
Toledo	5	–	3	–	0	7	–	4	–	0
Bowling Green	5	–	3	–	0	5	–	6	–	0
Kent State	5	–	3	–	0	5	–	6	–	0
Ball State	4	–	4	–	0	6	–	5	–	0
Eastern Michigan	4	–	4	–	0	6	–	5	–	0
Central Michigan	4	–	4	–	0	5	–	5	–	0
Western Michigan	3	–	5	–	0	3	–	8	–	0
Ohio	0	–	8	–	0	1	–	10	–	0
$ – Conference champion

The 1986 Ohio Bobcats football team was an American football team that represented Ohio University in the Mid-American Conference (MAC) during the 1986 NCAA Division I-A football season. In their second season under head coach Cleve Bryant, the Bobcats compiled a 1–10 record (0–8 against MAC opponents), finished in last place in the MAC, and were outscored by all opponents by a combined total of 329 to 196. They played their home games in Peden Stadium in Athens, Ohio.

== Schedule ==
Date	Opponent	Site	Result	Attendance	Source
September 6	at Bowling Green	Doyt Perry Stadium; Bowling Green, OH	L 16–21		
September 13	Marshall*	Peden Stadium; Athens, OH (rivalry)	L 7–21	16,400	
September 20	at Duke*	Wallace Wade Stadium; Durham, NC	L 7–22	28,500	
September 27	at Central Michigan	Kelly/Shorts Stadium; Mount Pleasant, MI	L 27–56		
October 4	Miami (OH)	Peden Stadium; Athens, OH (rivalry)	L 14–34	12,500	
October 11	at Ball State	Ball State Stadium; Muncie, IN	L 9–30		
October 18	at Eastern Michigan	Rynearson Stadium; Ypsilanti, MI	L 31–33		
October 25	Toledo	Peden Stadium; Athens, OH	L 21–24		
November 1	Kent State	Peden Stadium; Athens, OH	L 13–17		
November 8	at Western Michigan	Waldo Stadium; Kalamazoo, MI	L 17–45		
November 15	Northern Illinois*	Peden Stadium; Athens, OH	W 34–26	4,844	
*Non-conference game
