= 2012 Toledo Rockets football team =

American college football season

2012 Toledo Rockets football

Famous Idaho Potato Bowl, L 15–41 vs. Utah State
- Conference: Mid-American Conference
- West Division
- Record: 9–4 (6–2 MAC)
- Head coach: Matt Campbell (1st season)
- Offensive scheme: Spread
- Defensive coordinator: Tom Matukewicz (1st season)
- Base defense: 4–3
- Home stadium: Glass Bowl

2012 Mid-American Conference football standings
	Conf.			Overall
Team	W		L	W		L
East Division
Kent State x	8	–	0	11	–	3
Bowling Green	6	–	2	8	–	5
Ohio	4	–	4	9	–	4
Buffalo	3	–	5	4	–	8
Miami (OH)	3	–	5	4	–	8
UMass	1	–	7	1	–	11
Akron	0	–	8	1	–	11
West Division
No. 22 Northern Illinois x$	8	–	0	12	–	2
Toledo	6	–	2	9	–	4
Ball State	6	–	2	9	–	4
Central Michigan	4	–	4	7	–	6
Western Michigan	2	–	6	4	–	8
Eastern Michigan	1	–	7	2	–	10
Championship: Northern Illinois 44, Kent State 37
$ – Conference champion and BCS representative as top non-AQ school to meet automatic qualification criteria; x – Division champion/co-champions; UMass not eligible for conference title or bowl game as part of FBS transition; Rankings from AP Poll

The 2012 Toledo Rockets football team represented the University of Toledo in the 2012 NCAA Division I FBS football season. They were led by head coach Matt Campbell in his first full year after coaching the Rockets in the 2011 Military Bowl. They played their home games at the Glass Bowl. They were a member of the West Division of the Mid-American Conference. They finished the season 9–4, 6–2 in MAC play to finish in a tie for second place in the West Division. They were invited to the Famous Idaho Potato Bowl where they lost to Utah State.

== Schedule ==
Date	Time	Opponent	Rank	Site	TV	Result	Attendance
September 1	10:30 p.m.	at Arizona*		Arizona Stadium; Tucson, AZ	ESPNU	L 17–24 ^{OT}	48,670
September 8	4:00 p.m.	at Wyoming*		War Memorial Stadium; Laramie, WY		W 34–31	21,688
September 15	7:00 p.m.	Bowling Green		Glass Bowl; Toledo, OH (Battle of I-75)	ESPN3	W 27–15	28,115
September 22	7:00 p.m.	Coastal Carolina*		Glass Bowl; Toledo, OH	ESPN3	W 38–28	19,023
September 29	7:00 p.m.	at Western Michigan		Waldo Stadium; Kalamazoo, MI	ESPN3	W 37–17	15,628
October 6	3:00 p.m.	Central Michigan^{†}		Glass Bowl; Toledo, OH	ESPN3	W 50–35	19,247
October 13	1:00 p.m.	at Eastern Michigan		Rynearson Stadium; Ypsilanti, MI		W 52–47	2,837
October 20	7:00 p.m.	No. 21 Cincinnati*		Glass Bowl; Toledo, OH	ESPN3	W 29–23	24,124
October 27	3:30 p.m.	at Buffalo		UB Stadium; Amherst, NY	TWCS	W 25–20	10,658
November 6	8:00 p.m.	Ball State	No. 23	Glass Bowl; Toledo, OH	ESPN2	L 27–34	18,211
November 14	9:00 p.m.	Northern Illinois		Huskie Stadium; DeKalb, IL	ESPN2	L 24–31	17,813
November 20	7:00 p.m.	Akron		Glass Bowl; Toledo, OH	ESPN2	W 35–23	14,589
December 15	4:30 p.m.	vs. No. 18 Utah State*		Bronco Stadium; Boise, ID (Famous Idaho Potato Bowl)	ESPN	L 15–41	29,243
*Non-conference game; ^{†}Homecoming; Rankings from AP Poll released prior to the game; All times are in Eastern time

== Game summaries ==
=== @ Arizona ===
	1	2	3	4	OT	Total
Rockets	0	14	0	3	0	17
Wildcats	3	7	7	0	7	24

1st quarter scoring: ARIZ – J. Bonano 26-yard field goal

2nd quarter scoring: TOL – Alonzo Russell 59-yard pass from Terrance Owens (Jeremiah Detmer kick); ARIZ – A. Hill 30-yard pass from M. Scott (J. Bonano kick); TOL – David Fluellen 1-yard run (Detmer kick)

3rd quarter scoring: ARIZ – K. Carey 73-yard run (Bonano kick)

4th quarter scoring: TOL - Detmer 40-yard field goal

OT scoring: ARIZ – T. Miller 10-yard pass from Scott (Bonano kick)

=== @ Wyoming ===
	1	2	3	4	Total
Rockets	3	14	10	7	34
Cowboys	14	6	0	11	31

=== Bowling Green ===
	1	2	3	4	Total
Falcons	0	3	6	6	15
Rockets	7	10	7	3	27

=== Coastal Carolina ===
	1	2	3	4	Total
Chanticleers	7	7	7	7	28
Rockets	10	7	14	7	38

=== @ Western Michigan ===
	1	2	3	4	Total
Rockets	17	3	14	3	37
Broncos	0	7	10	0	17

=== Central Michigan ===
	1	2	3	4	Total
Chippewas	7	14	7	7	35
Rockets	10	7	14	19	50

=== @ Eastern Michigan ===
	1	2	3	4	Total
Rockets	7	14	28	3	52
Eagles	10	0	27	10	47

=== Cincinnati ===
	1	2	3	4	Total
#18 Bearcats	0	13	7	3	23
Rockets	10	6	10	3	29

Last meeting was in the 2001 Motor City Bowl.

=== @ Buffalo ===
	1	2	3	4	Total
Rockets	7	0	18	0	25
Bulls	7	7	0	6	20

=== Ball State ===
	1	2	3	4	Total
Cardinals	14	3	7	10	34
#23 Rockets	7	10	3	7	27

=== @ Northern Illinois ===
	1	2	3	4	Total
Rockets	7	7	0	10	24
Huskies	0	7	21	3	31

=== Akron ===
	1	2	3	4	Total
Zips	10	7	0	6	23
Rockets	0	21	0	14	35

=== Utah State–Famous Idaho Potato Bowl ===
	1	2	3	4	Total
Rockets	3	3	0	9	15
#20 Aggies	7	3	3	28	41
