= 1986 Toledo Rockets football team =

American college football season

1986 Toledo Rockets football
- Conference: Mid-American Conference
- Record: 7–4 (5–3 MAC)
- Head coach: Dan Simrell (5th season)
- Home stadium: Glass Bowl

1986 Mid-American Conference football standings
	Conf.					Overall
Team	W		L		T	W		L		T
Miami (OH) $	6	–	2	–	0	8	–	4	–	0
Toledo	5	–	3	–	0	7	–	4	–	0
Bowling Green	5	–	3	–	0	5	–	6	–	0
Kent State	5	–	3	–	0	5	–	6	–	0
Ball State	4	–	4	–	0	6	–	5	–	0
Eastern Michigan	4	–	4	–	0	6	–	5	–	0
Central Michigan	4	–	4	–	0	5	–	5	–	0
Western Michigan	3	–	5	–	0	3	–	8	–	0
Ohio	0	–	8	–	0	1	–	10	–	0
$ – Conference champion

The 1986 Toledo Rockets football team was an American football team that represented the University of Toledo in the Mid-American Conference (MAC) during the 1986 NCAA Division I-A football season. In their fifth season under head coach Dan Simrell, the Rockets compiled a 7–4 record (5–3 against MAC opponents), finished in a tie for second place in the MAC, and outscored their opponents by a combined total of 216 to 197.

The team's statistical leaders included A. J. Sager with 1,107 passing yards, Kelvin Farmer with 1,532 rushing yards, and Eric Hutchinson with 504 receiving yards.

== Schedule ==
Date	Opponent	Site	Result	Attendance	Source
August 30	at No. 11 Florida State*	Doak Campbell Stadium; Tallahassee, FL	L 0–24	53,891	
September 6	at Kent State	Dix Stadium; Kent, OH	L 16–18	10,200	
September 13	Wichita State*	Glass Bowl; Toledo, OH	W 30–13	19,146	
September 27	at Ball State	Ball State Stadium; Muncie, IN	L 10–27	6,150	
October 4	Eastern Michigan	Glass Bowl; Toledo, OH	W 23–18	17,638	
October 11	at Miami (OH)	Yager Stadium; Oxford, OH	L 8–24	16,629	
October 18	Northern Illinois*	Glass Bowl; Toledo, OH	W 29–28	19,169	
October 25	at Ohio	Peden Stadium; Athens, OH	W 24–21		
November 1	Western Michigan	Glass Bowl; Toledo, OH	W 28–7		
November 8	at Central Michigan	Kelly/Shorts Stadium; Mount Pleasant, MI	W 26–14		
November 15	Bowling Green	Glass Bowl; Toledo, OH (rivalry)	W 22–3	22,226	
*Non-conference game; Rankings from Coaches' Poll released prior to the game
