= 1986 Ball State Cardinals football team =

American college football season

1986 Ball State Cardinals football
- Conference: Mid-American Conference
- Record: 6–5 (4–4 MAC)
- Head coach: Paul Schudel (2nd season)
- Home stadium: Ball State Stadium

1986 Mid-American Conference football standings
	Conf.					Overall
Team	W		L		T	W		L		T
Miami (OH) $	6	–	2	–	0	8	–	4	–	0
Toledo	5	–	3	–	0	7	–	4	–	0
Bowling Green	5	–	3	–	0	5	–	6	–	0
Kent State	5	–	3	–	0	5	–	6	–	0
Ball State	4	–	4	–	0	6	–	5	–	0
Eastern Michigan	4	–	4	–	0	6	–	5	–	0
Central Michigan	4	–	4	–	0	5	–	5	–	0
Western Michigan	3	–	5	–	0	3	–	8	–	0
Ohio	0	–	8	–	0	1	–	10	–	0
$ – Conference champion

The 1986 Ball State Cardinals football team was an American football team that represented Ball State University in the Mid-American Conference (MAC) during the 1986 NCAA Division I-A football season. In its second season under head coach Paul Schudel, the team compiled a 6–5 record (4–4 against conference opponents) and finished in a three-way tie for fifth place out of nine teams in the MAC. The team played its home games at Ball State Stadium in Muncie, Indiana.

The team's statistical leaders included Wade Kosakowski with 1,459 passing yards, Carlton Campbell with 688 rushing yards, and Deon Chester with 601 receiving yards, and John Diettrich with 71 points scored.

== Schedule ==
Date	Opponent	Site	Result	Attendance	Source
August 30	at Northern Illinois*	Huskie Stadium; DeKalb, IL (rivalry)	W 20–10	11,369	
September 6	at Miami (OH)	Yager Stadium; Oxford, OH	L 7–45		
September 13	at Purdue*	Ross–Ade Stadium; West Lafayette, IN	L 3–20	60,161	
September 27	Toledo	Ball State Stadium; Muncie, IN	W 27–10	6,150	
October 4	vs. Indiana State*	Hoosier Dome; Indianapolis, IN (Blue Key Victory Bell)	W 16–3	8,325	
October 11	Ohio	Ball State Stadium; Muncie, IN	W 30–9		
October 18	Kent State	Ball State Stadium; Muncie, IN	W 26–17	11,220	
October 25	Western Michigan	Ball State Stadium; Muncie, IN	W 24–10		
November 1	at Eastern Michigan	Rynearson Stadium; Ypsilanti, MI	L 7–14		
November 8	at Bowling Green	Doyt Perry Stadium; Bowling Green, OH	L 17–20	20,104	
November 15	at Central Michigan	Kelly/Shorts Stadium; Mount Pleasant, MI	L 22–43		
*Non-conference game
