= 2012 Akron Zips football team =

American college football season

2012 Akron Zips football
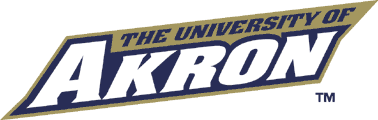
- Conference: Mid-American Conference
- East Division
- Record: 1–11 (0–8 MAC)
- Head coach: Terry Bowden (1st season)
- Offensive scheme: Spread
- Defensive coordinator: Chuck Amato (1st season)
- Base defense: 4–3
- Home stadium: InfoCision Stadium–Summa Field

2012 Mid-American Conference football standings
	Conf.			Overall
Team	W		L	W		L
East Division
Kent State x	8	–	0	11	–	3
Bowling Green	6	–	2	8	–	5
Ohio	4	–	4	9	–	4
Buffalo	3	–	5	4	–	8
Miami (OH)	3	–	5	4	–	8
UMass	1	–	7	1	–	11
Akron	0	–	8	1	–	11
West Division
No. 22 Northern Illinois x$	8	–	0	12	–	2
Toledo	6	–	2	9	–	4
Ball State	6	–	2	9	–	4
Central Michigan	4	–	4	7	–	6
Western Michigan	2	–	6	4	–	8
Eastern Michigan	1	–	7	2	–	10
Championship: Northern Illinois 44, Kent State 37
$ – Conference champion and BCS representative as top non-AQ school to meet automatic qualification criteria; x – Division champion/co-champions; UMass not eligible for conference title or bowl game as part of FBS transition; Rankings from AP Poll

The 2012 Akron Zips football team represented the University of Akron in the 2012 NCAA Division I FBS football season. They were led by first-year head coach Terry Bowden and played their home games at InfoCision Stadium – Summa Field. They were a member of the East Division of the Mid-American Conference. They finished the season 1–11, 0–8 in MAC play to finish in last place in the East Division.

== Schedule ==
Date	Time	Opponent	Site	TV	Result	Attendance
August 30	7:00 p.m.	UCF*	InfoCision Stadium; Akron, OH	ESPN3	L 14–56	12,616
September 8	6:00 p.m.	at FIU*	FIU Stadium; Miami, FL	ESPN3	L 38–41 ^{OT}	15,685
September 15	3:30 p.m.	Morgan State*	InfoCision Stadium; Akron, OH	ESPN3	W 66–6	9,933
September 22	7:30 p.m.	at Tennessee*	Neyland Stadium; Knoxville, TN	CSS	L 26–47	81,719
September 29	2:00 p.m.	Miami (OH)	InfoCision Stadium; Akron, OH	ESPN3	L 49–56	8,211
October 6	2:00 p.m.	Bowling Green^{†}	InfoCision Stadium; Akron, OH		L 10–24	10,102
October 13	2:00 p.m.	at Ohio	Peden Stadium; Athens, OH	ESPN3	L 28–34	25,542
October 20	Noon	Northern Illinois	InfoCision Stadium; Akron, OH	ESPN+	L 7–37	7,074
October 27	3:30 p.m.	at Central Michigan	Kelly/Shorts Stadium; Mount Pleasant, MI		L 14–35	10,172
November 3	2:00 p.m.	at Kent State	Dix Stadium; Kent, OH (Battle for the Wagon Wheel)	STO	L 24–35	18,265
November 10	2:00 p.m.	Massachusetts	InfoCision Stadium; Akron, OH		L 14–22	7,716
November 20	7:00 p.m.	at Toledo	Glass Bowl; Toledo, OH	ESPN2	L 23–35	14,589
*Non-conference game; ^{†}Homecoming; All times are in Eastern time

- Source: Schedule

== Game summaries ==
=== UCF ===
	1	2	3	4	Total
Knights	7	28	14	7	56
Zips	0	0	7	7	14

=== @ FIU ===
	1	2	3	4	OT	Total
Zips	7	13	0	18	0	38
Golden Panthers	7	7	7	17	3	41

=== Morgan State ===
	1	2	3	4	Total
Bears	3	3	0	0	6
Zips	14	7	24	21	66

=== @ Tennessee ===
	1	2	3	4	Total
Zips	10	13	0	3	26
Volunteers	10	13	7	17	47

=== Miami (OH) ===
	1	2	3	4	Total
RedHawks	13	22	10	11	56
Zips	14	14	7	14	49

=== Bowling Green ===
	1	2	3	4	Total
Falcons	0	0	17	7	24
Zips	0	10	0	0	10

=== @ Ohio ===
	1	2	3	4	Total
Zips	0	7	7	14	28
Bobcats	14	6	14	0	34

=== Northern Illinois ===
	1	2	3	4	Total
Huskies	10	10	10	7	37
Zips	0	7	0	0	7

=== @ Central Michigan ===
	1	2	3	4	Total
Zips	7	0	0	7	14
Chippewas	14	0	14	7	35

=== @ Kent State ===
	1	2	3	4	Total
Zips	14	10	0	0	24
Golden Flashes	0	14	14	7	35

=== Massachusetts ===
	1	2	3	4	Total
Minutemen	3	12	0	7	22
Zips	0	0	7	7	14

=== @ Toledo ===
	1	2	3	4	Total
Zips	10	7	0	6	23
Rockets	0	21	0	14	35

== Roster ==
2012 Akron Zips football team roster
Players
Coaches
Offense

Pos.	#	Name	Class
RB	2	Broderick Alexander	Jr
WR	3	L. T. Smith	So
QB	4	Daniel Harding	Fr
QB	5	Steve Franco	Fr
QB	6	Dalton Easton	Fr
RB	7	Jawon Chisholm	So
QB	8	Curtis Watson	Jr
QB	9	Marcus Prather	Fr
RB	10	Hakeem Lawrence	Fr
WR	11	Zach D'Orazio	Fr
WR	12	Imani Davis	Fr
QB	13	Dalton Williams	Sr
WR	14	Nice Bice	So
WR	14	Dylan Potts	Jr
WR	15	Marquelo Suel	Sr
QB	16	Kyle Pohl	Fr
WR/RB	17	Wade Edwards	Fr
TE/FB	18	Will Fleming	Jr
WR	19	Nolan Procter	Jr
RB	22	Tyler Williams	So
RB	25	D. J. Jones	Fr
RB	28	Marvin Staten	So
RB	30	Bryan Green	Fr
RB	32	Quentin Hines	Sr
RB	34	Conor Hundley	Fr
WR	35	Keith Sconiers	Jr
FB	49	Christian Allen	Fr
OL	52	Vinnie Rizzo	Sr
OL	62	Rodney Carroll	Fr
OT	64	Mitch Straight	Sr
C	65	Adam Bice	Sr
G	67	Travis Switzer	So
OL	69	Zack Ziltz	Fr
OL	70	Michael Casimos	Fr
OL	71	Quaison Osborne	Fr
OL	72	Joe Petrides	Jr
OL	73	Drew Deneher	Fr
OL	75	Dylan Brumbaugh	Fr
OT	76	Jarrod Pughsley	Jr
OL	77	Andrew Bohan	Fr
OL	78	Micah Lio	So
WR	80	Andrew Pratt	Fr
WR	81	Tyrell Goodman	Fr
WR	83	Dee Frieson	Jr
TE	84	Rhyne Ladrach	Sr
WR	85	L. J. Chambers	So
TE	86	Jon Root	Jr
TE	87	Anthony Ritossa	So
WR	88	Jerrod Dillard	Jr

Defense

Pos.	#	Name	Class
CB	4	Anthony Holmes	Jr
LB	5	Troy Gilmer	Sr
CB	6	DeAndre Scott	Fr
LB	8	Kurt Mangum	Sr
CB	9	Avis Commack	Sr
S	18	Sean Graves	Jr
CB	19	John Senter	Fr
CB	20	Malachi Freeman	Jr
CB	21	Bill Alexander	Jr
S	23	Bre' Ford	So
CB	24	Carl Washington	Fr
CB	25	Micklos Blake	Sr
S	26	Devonte Morgan	So
S	27	Johnny Robinson	So
CB	29	Bryce Cheek	Fr
CB	31	Emmanuel Lartey	Jr
S	33	Josh Richmond	Sr
DL	36	Cody Grice	Fr
CB	37	Seth Cunningham	Jr
S	39	James Turner	Fr
DL	40	Austin Bailey	Jr
LB	41	Chuck Kennedy	Jr
DE	42	C. J. James	Sr
S	42	Joseph Peticca	So
LB	44	Nick Rossi	So
LB	45	Justin March	So
LB	47	Gary Ransom	So
LB	50	Jamar Williams	Jr
LB	53	Jatavis Brown	Fr
LB	54	Dylan Evans	Fr
DL	55	Jamel Turner	Fr
DL	56	Isaiah Williams	So
LB	57	Keionne Baines	Fr
DE	58	Nico Caponi	Jr
LB	59	John Rachel	Fr
LB	60	Adammichael Gesell	Fr
DL	63	Varnell Garrett	So
DL	79	Mike Davis	Fr
DL	90	J. D. Griggs	Sr
DE	91	Albert Presley	Jr
DE	92	Daryan Martin	Fr
LB	93	Connor Seeman	Jr
DL	94	Rakhim Johnson	Fr
DL	95	Robert Young	Jr
DL	96	Alfonso Horner	Fr
DL	98	Paul Skolmutch	Jr
DL	99	James Price	Fr

Special teams

Pos.	#	Name	Class
K	38	Zach Paul	Fr
LS	43	Adam Steiner	Sr
K	48	Robert Stein	Fr
K	68	Sam Scifo	Fr

Head coach

- Terry Bowden

Coordinators/assistant coaches

- Chuck Amato (defensive coordinator / associate head coach)
- Jeff Bowden (special teams coordinator / outside receivers)
- A. J. Milwee (quarterbacks coach)
- Trent Boykin (running backs)
- John Pont (recruiting coordinator / inside receivers)
- Alan Arrington (offensive line)
- Todd Stroud (defensive line)
- Terrell Buckley (cornerbacks)
- Mike Woodford (safeties)
- Ben Murphy (director of football operations)
- Mark Ouimet (assistant director of football operations)
- Kyle Futch (offensive graduate assistant)
- Jason Morgan (offensive graduate assistant)
- Matt Arshinkoff (defensive graduate assistant)
- Danny Breyer (defensive graduate assistant)

Legend

- (C) Team captain
- (S) Suspended
- (I) Ineligible
- Injured
- Redshirt

Roster
Last update: June 18, 2013
