= 2012 Connecticut Huskies football team =

American college football season

2012 Connecticut Huskies football
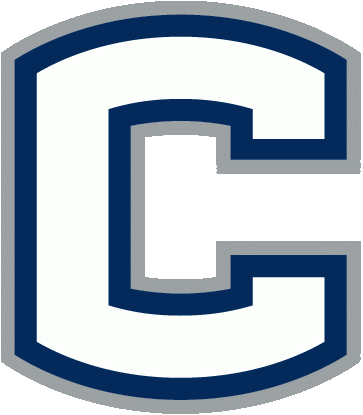
- Conference: Big East Conference
- Record: 5–7 (2–5 Big East)
- Head coach: Paul Pasqualoni (2nd season)
- Offensive coordinator: George DeLeone (2nd season)
- Offensive scheme: Pro-style
- Defensive coordinator: Don Brown (2nd season)
- Base defense: 4–3
- Home stadium: Rentschler Field

2012 Big East Conference football standings
	Conf.			Overall
Team	W		L	W		L
No. 13 Louisville $+	5	–	2	11	–	2
Cincinnati +	5	–	2	10	–	3
Rutgers +	5	–	2	9	–	4
Syracuse +	5	–	2	8	–	5
Pittsburgh	3	–	4	6	–	7
Connecticut	2	–	5	5	–	7
Temple	2	–	5	4	–	7
South Florida	1	–	6	3	–	9
$ – BCS representative as conference champion; + – Conference co-champions; Rankings from AP Poll

The 2012 Connecticut Huskies football team represented the University of Connecticut as a member of the Big East Conference during the 2012 NCAA Division I FBS football season. Led by second-year head coach Paul Pasqualoni, the Huskies compiled an overall record of 5–7 with a mark of 2–5 in conference play, tying for sixth place in the Big East. The team played home games at Rentschler Field in East Hartford, Connecticut.

== Schedule ==
Date	Time	Opponent	Site	TV	Result	Attendance
August 30	7:30 pm	UMass*	Rentschler Field; East Hartford, CT (rivalry)	SNY	W 37–0	35,270
September 8	12:00 pm	NC State*	Rentschler Field; East Hartford, CT	Big East Network	L 7–10	34,202
September 15	12:30 pm	at Maryland*	Byrd Stadium; College Park, MD	ACC Network	W 24–21	35,491
September 22	2:00 pm	at Western Michigan*	Waldo Stadium; Kalamazoo, MI	ESPN3	L 24–30	10,328
September 29	12:00 pm	Buffalo*	Rentschler Field; East Hartford, CT	Big East Network	W 24–17	34,666
October 6	12:00 pm	at No. 22 Rutgers	High Point Solutions Stadium; Piscataway, NJ	ESPNU	L 3–19	50,870
October 13	1:00 pm	Temple^{†}	Rentschler Field; East Hartford, CT	ESPN3	L 14–17 ^{OT}	37,279
October 19	8:00 pm	at Syracuse	Carrier Dome; Syracuse, NY (rivalry)	ESPN	L 10–40	36,715
November 3	7:00 pm	at South Florida	Raymond James Stadium; Tampa, FL	ESPNU	L 6–13	36,190
November 9	8:00 pm	Pittsburgh	Rentschler Field; East Hartford, CT	ESPN2	W 24–17	33,503
November 24	12:00 pm	at No. 19 Louisville	Papa John's Cardinal Stadium; Louisville, KY	Big East Network	W 23–20 ^{3OT}	45,618
December 1	3:30 pm	Cincinnati	Rentschler Field; East Hartford, CT	ABC	L 17–34	33,112
*Non-conference game; ^{†}Homecoming; Rankings from AP Poll released prior to the game; All times are in Eastern time

== NFL draft ==
The following Huskies were selected in the 2013 NFL draft following the season

Round	Pick	Player	Position	NFL team
3	64	Dwayne Gratz	Defensive back	Jacksonville Jaguars
3	66	Sio Moore	Linebacker	Oakland Raiders
3	70	Blidi Wreh-Wilson	Defensive back	Tennessee Titans
4	127	Trevardo Williams	Defensive end	Houston Texans
6	201	Ryan Griffin	Tight end	Houston Texans
