= 2012 Buffalo Bulls football team =

American college football season

2012 Buffalo Bulls football
- Conference: Mid-American Conference
- East Division
- Record: 4–8 (3–5 MAC)
- Head coach: Jeff Quinn (3rd season)
- Offensive coordinator: Alex Wood (2nd season)
- Offensive scheme: Multiple
- Defensive coordinator: Lou Tepper (1st season)
- Base defense: 3–4
- Captains: Khalil Mack; Steven Means; Alex Neutz; Branden Oliver
- Home stadium: University at Buffalo Stadium

2012 Mid-American Conference football standings
	Conf.			Overall
Team	W		L	W		L
East Division
Kent State x	8	–	0	11	–	3
Bowling Green	6	–	2	8	–	5
Ohio	4	–	4	9	–	4
Buffalo	3	–	5	4	–	8
Miami (OH)	3	–	5	4	–	8
UMass	1	–	7	1	–	11
Akron	0	–	8	1	–	11
West Division
No. 22 Northern Illinois x$	8	–	0	12	–	2
Toledo	6	–	2	9	–	4
Ball State	6	–	2	9	–	4
Central Michigan	4	–	4	7	–	6
Western Michigan	2	–	6	4	–	8
Eastern Michigan	1	–	7	2	–	10
Championship: Northern Illinois 44, Kent State 37
$ – Conference champion and BCS representative as top non-AQ school to meet automatic qualification criteria; x – Division champion/co-champions; UMass not eligible for conference title or bowl game as part of FBS transition; Rankings from AP Poll

The 2012 Buffalo Bulls football team represented the University at Buffalo as a member of the Mid-American Conference (MAC) during the 2012 NCAA Division I FBS football season. Led by third-year head coach Jeff Quinn, the Bulls compiled an overall record of 4–8 with a mark of 3–5 in conference play, tying for fourth place in the MAC's East Division. The team played home games at the University at Buffalo Stadium in Amherst, New York.

== Schedule ==
Date	Time	Opponent	Site	TV	Result	Attendance
September 1	12:00 pm	at No. 6 Georgia*	Sanford Stadium; Athens, GA	SECN	L 23–45	92,446
September 8	6:00 pm	Morgan State*	University at Buffalo Stadium; Amherst, NY	TWCS	W 56–34	15,570
September 19	7:00 pm	Kent State	University at Buffalo Stadium; Amherst, NY	ESPNU	L 7–23	14,373
September 29	12:00 pm	at Connecticut*	Rentschler Field; East Hartford, CT	Big East Network	L 17–24	34,666
October 6	12:00 pm	at Ohio	Peden Stadium; Athens, OH	ESPN Plus, CSS	L 31–38	20,044
October 13	3:30 pm	at Northern Illinois	Huskie Stadium; DeKalb, IL		L 3–45	14,419
October 20	3:30 pm	Pittsburgh*^{†}	University at Buffalo Stadium; Amherst, NY	ESPN Plus	L 6–20	17,021
October 27	3:30 pm	Toledo	University at Buffalo Stadium; Amherst, NY	TWCS	L 20–25	10,658
November 3	12:00 pm	Miami (OH)	University at Buffalo Stadium; Amherst, NY		W 27–24	10,817
November 10	3:30 pm	Western Michigan	University at Buffalo Stadium; Amherst, NY		W 29–24	11,012
November 17	3:00 pm	at UMass	Gillette Stadium; Foxborough, MA (rivalry)		W 29–19	12,649
November 23	2:00 pm	vs. Bowling Green	Columbus Crew Stadium; Columbus, OH	BCSN	L 7–21	11,846
*Non-conference game; ^{†}Homecoming; Rankings from AP Poll released prior to the game; All times are in Eastern time

== Game summaries ==
=== @ Georgia ===
	1	2	3	4	Total
Bulls	6	10	0	7	23
#6 Bulldogs	14	10	7	14	45

=== Morgan State ===
	1	2	3	4	Total
Bears	3	10	14	7	34
Bulls	14	21	21	0	56

=== Kent State ===
	1	2	3	4	Total
Golden Flashes	0	10	3	10	23
Bulls	0	7	0	0	7

=== @ Connecticut ===
	1	2	3	4	Total
Bulls	7	0	7	3	17
Huskies	3	14	7	0	24

=== @ Ohio ===
	1	2	3	4	Total
Bulls	14	0	10	7	31
Bobcats	7	14	3	14	38

=== @ Northern Illinois ===
	1	2	3	4	Total
Bulls	3	0	0	0	3
Huskies	7	21	14	3	45

=== Pittsburgh ===
	1	2	3	4	Total
Panthers	6	7	7	0	20
Bulls	0	6	0	0	6

=== Toledo ===
	1	2	3	4	Total
Rockets	7	0	18	0	25
Bulls	7	7	0	6	20

=== Miami (OH) ===
	1	2	3	4	Total
RedHawks	0	3	7	14	24
Bulls	0	3	14	10	27

=== Western Michigan ===
	1	2	3	4	Total
Broncos	0	14	7	3	24
Bulls	7	10	6	6	29

=== @ UMass ===
	1	2	3	4	Total
Bulls	0	0	14	15	29
Minutemen	3	10	6	0	19

=== vs Bowling Green ===
	1	2	3	4	Total
Bulls	0	0	0	7	7
Falcons	0	14	7	0	21

== After the season ==
=== NFL draft ===
The following Bull was selected in the 2013 NFL draft following the season.

Round	Pick	Player	Position	NFL club
5	147	Steven Means	Defensive end	Tampa Bay Buccaneers
