= 2012 Western Michigan Broncos football team =

American college football season

2012 Western Michigan Broncos football
- Conference: Mid-American Conference
- West Division
- Record: 4–8 (2–6 MAC)
- Head coach: Bill Cubit (8th season)
- Co-offensive coordinator: Ryan Cubit (1st season)
- Offensive scheme: Multiple
- Defensive coordinator: Rich Nagy (1st season)
- Base defense: 3–3–5
- Home stadium: Waldo Stadium

2012 Mid-American Conference football standings
	Conf.			Overall
Team	W		L	W		L
East Division
Kent State x	8	–	0	11	–	3
Bowling Green	6	–	2	8	–	5
Ohio	4	–	4	9	–	4
Buffalo	3	–	5	4	–	8
Miami (OH)	3	–	5	4	–	8
UMass	1	–	7	1	–	11
Akron	0	–	8	1	–	11
West Division
No. 22 Northern Illinois x$	8	–	0	12	–	2
Toledo	6	–	2	9	–	4
Ball State	6	–	2	9	–	4
Central Michigan	4	–	4	7	–	6
Western Michigan	2	–	6	4	–	8
Eastern Michigan	1	–	7	2	–	10
Championship: Northern Illinois 44, Kent State 37
$ – Conference champion and BCS representative as top non-AQ school to meet automatic qualification criteria; x – Division champion/co-champions; UMass not eligible for conference title or bowl game as part of FBS transition; Rankings from AP Poll

The 2012 Western Michigan Broncos football team represented Western Michigan University in the 2012 NCAA Division I FBS football season. They were led by eighth-year head coach Bill Cubit and played their home games at Waldo Stadium as a member of the West Division of the Mid-American Conference (MAC). In 2011, the Broncos finished at 7–6 (5–3 MAC), third place in the MAC West division.

Western Michigan fired Cubit on November 17, 2012, following a season-ending loss to Eastern Michigan. WMU finished the year 4–8, its worst record since 2004. P. J. Fleck, 32-year-old Tampa Bay Buccaneers assistant, was named head coach on December 18, 2012.

== Schedule ==
Date	Time	Opponent	Site	TV	Result	Attendance
September 1	Noon	at Illinois*	Memorial Stadium; Champaign, IL	ESPNU	L 7–24	43,441
September 8	7:00 pm	Eastern Illinois*	Waldo Stadium; Kalamazoo, MI	ESPN3	W 52–21	22,536
September 15	Noon	at Minnesota*	TCF Bank Stadium; Minneapolis, MN	BTN	L 23–28	44,921
September 22	2:00 pm	Connecticut*	Waldo Stadium; Kalamazoo, MI	ESPN3	W 30–24	10,328
September 29	7:00 pm	Toledo	Waldo Stadium; Kalamazoo, MI	ESPN3	L 17–37	15,628
October 6	2:00 pm	Massachusetts^{†}	Waldo Stadium; Kalamazoo, MI		W 52–14	15,671
October 13	3:00 pm	at Ball State	Scheumann Stadium; Muncie, IN	ESPN3	L 24–30 ^{OT}	14,192
October 20	3:30 pm	at Kent State	Dix Stadium; Kent, OH		L 24–41	16,128
October 27	Noon	Northern Illinois	Waldo Stadium; Kalamazoo, MI	ESPN+	L 34–48	12,974
November 3	1:00 pm	at Central Michigan	Kelly/Shorts Stadium; Mount Pleasant, MI (Michigan MAC Trophy/Victory Cannon)	ESPN3	W 42–31	15,322
November 10	3:30 pm	at Buffalo	UB Stadium; Amherst, NY		L 24–29	11,012
November 17	2:00 pm	Eastern Michigan	Waldo Stadium; Kalamazoo, MI (Michigan MAC Trophy)		L 23–29	10,338
*Non-conference game; ^{†}Homecoming; All times are in Eastern time

- Source: Schedule

== Game summaries ==
=== At Illinois ===
	1	2	3	4	Total
Broncos	0	0	7	0	7
Fighting Illini	10	7	0	7	24

First quarter scoring: ILL – Ryan Lankford received a 64-yard pass from Nick Scheelhaase (Nick Immekus kick); Immekus kicked 43-yard field goal.

Second quarter scoring: ILL – Scheelhaase 4-yard run (Immekus kick).

Third quarter scoring: WMU – Jaime Wilson received an 8-yard pass from Alex Carder (Andrew Haldeman kick).

4th quarter scoring: ILL – Ashante Williams returned a 60-yard interception (Immekus kick).

=== Eastern Illinois ===
	1	2	3	4	Total
Panthers	14	0	0	7	21
Broncos	14	28	3	7	52

Referee for the game was Tony Canella.

=== At Minnesota ===
	1	2	3	4	Total
Broncos	3	7	7	6	23
Golden Gophers	7	14	7	0	28

=== Connecticut ===
	1	2	3	4	Total
Huskies	0	7	7	10	24
Broncos	3	14	7	6	30

=== Toledo ===
	1	2	3	4	Total
Rockets	17	3	14	3	37
Broncos	0	7	10	0	17

=== Massachusetts ===
	1	2	3	4	Total
Minutemen	0	7	0	7	14
Broncos	7	21	21	3	52

=== At Ball State ===
	1	2	3	4	OT	Total
Broncos	7	14	0	3	0	24
Cardinals	7	3	7	7	6	30

=== At Kent State ===
	1	2	3	4	Total
Broncos	7	3	14	0	24
Golden Flashes	7	10	7	17	41

=== Northern Illinois ===
	1	2	3	4	Total
Huskies	7	10	14	17	48
Broncos	14	7	0	13	34

=== At Central Michigan ===
	1	2	3	4	Total
Broncos	0	14	0	28	42
Chippewas	6	7	10	8	31

=== At Buffalo ===
	1	2	3	4	Total
Broncos	0	14	7	3	24
Bulls	7	10	6	6	29

=== Eastern Michigan ===
	1	2	3	4	Total
Eagles	14	3	9	3	29
Broncos	0	14	3	6	23
