= 2012 Miami RedHawks football team =

American college football season

2012 Miami RedHawks football
- Conference: Mid-American Conference
- East Division
- Record: 4–8 (3–5 MAC)
- Head coach: Don Treadwell (2nd season)
- Offensive coordinator: John Klacik (2nd season)
- Offensive scheme: Multiple
- Defensive coordinator: Jay Peterson (1st season)
- Base defense: 4–3
- Home stadium: Yager Stadium

2012 Mid-American Conference football standings
	Conf.			Overall
Team	W		L	W		L
East Division
Kent State x	8	–	0	11	–	3
Bowling Green	6	–	2	8	–	5
Ohio	4	–	4	9	–	4
Buffalo	3	–	5	4	–	8
Miami (OH)	3	–	5	4	–	8
UMass	1	–	7	1	–	11
Akron	0	–	8	1	–	11
West Division
No. 22 Northern Illinois x$	8	–	0	12	–	2
Toledo	6	–	2	9	–	4
Ball State	6	–	2	9	–	4
Central Michigan	4	–	4	7	–	6
Western Michigan	2	–	6	4	–	8
Eastern Michigan	1	–	7	2	–	10
Championship: Northern Illinois 44, Kent State 37
$ – Conference champion and BCS representative as top non-AQ school to meet automatic qualification criteria; x – Division champion/co-champions; UMass not eligible for conference title or bowl game as part of FBS transition; Rankings from AP Poll

The 2012 Miami RedHawks football team represented Miami University in the 2012 NCAA Division I FBS football season. They were led by second-year head coach Don Treadwell and played their home games at Yager Stadium.

They were a member of the East Division of the Mid-American Conference. They finished the season 4–8, 3–5 in MAC play to finish in a tie for fourth place in the East Division. Quarterback Zac Dysert led the conference with 3,483 passing yards, and was drafted after the season in the 7th round of the 2013 NFL draft.

== Schedule ==
Date	Time	Opponent	Site	TV	Result	Attendance
September 1	12:00 p.m.	at No. 18 Ohio State*	Ohio Stadium; Columbus, OH	BTN	L 10–56	105,039
September 8	1:00 p.m.	Southern Illinois*	Yager Stadium; Oxford, OH	ESPN3	W 30–14	17,725
September 15	4:00 p.m.	at Boise State*	Bronco Stadium; Boise, ID	NBCSN	L 12–39	34,178
September 22	12:00 p.m.	UMass	Yager Stadium; Oxford, OH	ESPN Plus, ESPN3	W 27–16	15,159
September 29	2:00 p.m.	at Akron	InfoCision Stadium–Summa Field; Akron, OH	ESPN3	W 56–49	8,211
October 6	7:00 p.m.	at Cincinnati*	Nippert Stadium; Cincinnati, OH (Victory Bell)	FSOHIO	L 14–52	35,097
October 13	3:30 p.m.	at Bowling Green	Doyt Perry Stadium; Bowling Green, OH	BCSN, ESPN3	L 12–37	17,071
October 27	3:30 p.m.	No. 23 Ohio	Yager Stadium; Oxford, OH (Battle of the Bricks)	STO	W 23–20	19,326
November 3	12:00 p.m.	at Buffalo	University at Buffalo Stadium; Amherst, NY		L 24–27	10,817
November 10	1:00 p.m.	Kent State	Yager Stadium; Oxford, OH	STO	L 32–48	13,301
November 17	1:00 p.m.	at Central Michigan	Kelly/Shorts Stadium; Mount Pleasant, MI		L 16–30	7,223
November 23	1:00 p.m.	Ball State	Yager Stadium; Oxford, OH		L 24–31	8,154
*Non-conference game; Rankings from AP Poll released prior to the game; All times are in Eastern time

== Game summaries ==
=== @ Ohio State ===
	1	2	3	4	Total
RedHawks	3	0	7	0	10
Buckeyes	0	21	14	21	56

=== Southern Illinois ===
	1	2	3	4	Total
Salukis	7	0	0	7	14
RedHawks	7	7	10	6	30

=== @ Boise State ===
	1	2	3	4	Total
RedHawks	0	9	0	3	12
Broncos	8	7	21	3	39

=== Massachusetts ===
	1	2	3	4	Total
Minutemen	0	3	7	6	16
RedHawks	0	14	7	6	27

=== @ Akron ===
	1	2	3	4	Total
RedHawks	13	22	10	11	56
Zips	14	14	7	14	49

=== @ Cincinnati ===
	1	2	3	4	Total
RedHawks	6	8	0	0	14
#23 Bearcats	14	10	21	7	52

=== @ Bowling Green ===
	1	2	3	4	Total
RedHawks	3	3	6	0	12
Falcons	7	10	14	6	37

=== Ohio ===
	1	2	3	4	Total
#23 Bobcats	7	7	3	3	20
RedHawks	13	7	0	3	23

=== @ Buffalo ===
	1	2	3	4	Total
RedHawks	0	3	7	14	24
Bulls	0	3	14	10	27

=== Kent State ===
	1	2	3	4	Total
Golden Flashes	21	14	3	10	48
RedHawks	0	10	8	14	32

=== @ Central Michigan ===
	1	2	3	4	Total
RedHawks	7	0	3	6	16
Chippewas	7	14	0	9	30

=== Ball State ===
	1	2	3	4	Total
Cardinals	14	7	10	0	31
RedHawks	7	7	0	10	24
