= 2012 Central Michigan Chippewas football team =

American college football season

2012 Central Michigan Chippewas football

Little Caesars Pizza Bowl champion

Little Caesars Pizza Bowl, W 24–21 vs. Western Kentucky
- Conference: Mid-American Conference
- West Division
- Record: 7–6 (4–4 MAC)
- Head coach: Dan Enos (3rd season)
- Offensive coordinator: Mike Cummings (3rd season)
- Defensive coordinator: Joe Tumpkin (3rd season)
- Home stadium: Kelly/Shorts Stadium

2012 Mid-American Conference football standings
	Conf.			Overall
Team	W		L	W		L
East Division
Kent State x	8	–	0	11	–	3
Bowling Green	6	–	2	8	–	5
Ohio	4	–	4	9	–	4
Buffalo	3	–	5	4	–	8
Miami (OH)	3	–	5	4	–	8
UMass	1	–	7	1	–	11
Akron	0	–	8	1	–	11
West Division
No. 22 Northern Illinois x$	8	–	0	12	–	2
Toledo	6	–	2	9	–	4
Ball State	6	–	2	9	–	4
Central Michigan	4	–	4	7	–	6
Western Michigan	2	–	6	4	–	8
Eastern Michigan	1	–	7	2	–	10
Championship: Northern Illinois 44, Kent State 37
$ – Conference champion and BCS representative as top non-AQ school to meet automatic qualification criteria; x – Division champion/co-champions; UMass not eligible for conference title or bowl game as part of FBS transition; Rankings from AP Poll

The 2012 Central Michigan Chippewas football team represented Central Michigan University in the 2012 NCAA Division I FBS football season. They were led by third-year head coach Dan Enos and played their home games at Kelly/Shorts Stadium. They were a member of the West Division of the Mid-American Conference. They concluded the season with 7–6 overall, 4–4 MAC, and won the Little Caesars Pizza Bowl over Western Kentucky.

== Schedule ==
Date	Time	Opponent	Site	TV	Result	Attendance
August 30	7:00 pm	SE Missouri State*	Kelly/Shorts Stadium; Mount Pleasant, MI	ESPN3	W 38–27	15,250
September 8	3:30 pm	No. 11 Michigan State*	Kelly/Shorts Stadium; Mount Pleasant, MI	ESPNU	L 7–41	35,127
September 22	12:00 pm	at Iowa*	Kinnick Stadium; Iowa City, IA	BTN	W 32–31	70,585
September 29	3:30 pm	at Northern Illinois	Huskie Stadium; DeKalb, IL		L 24–55	16,292
October 6	3:00 pm	at Toledo	Glass Bowl; Toledo, OH	ESPN3	L 35–50	19,247
October 12	8:00 pm	Navy*	Kelly/Shorts Stadium; Mount Pleasant, MI	ESPN2	L 13–31	15,074
October 20	3:30 pm	Ball State^{†}	Kelly/Shorts Stadium; Mount Pleasant, MI	ESPN3	L 30–41	14,081
October 27	3:30 pm	Akron	Kelly/Shorts Stadium; Mount Pleasant, MI		W 35–14	10,172
November 3	1:00 pm	Western Michigan	Kelly/Shorts Stadium; Mount Pleasant, MI (rivalry)	ESPN3	L 31–42	15,322
November 10	1:00 pm	at Eastern Michigan	Rynearson Stadium; Ypsilanti, MI (rivalry)		W 34–31	4,081
November 17	1:00 pm	Miami (OH)	Kelly/Shorts Stadium; Mount Pleasant, MI		W 30–16	7,223
November 23	3:00 pm	at Massachusetts	Gillette Stadium; Foxborough, MA		W 42–24	6,385
December 26	7:30 pm	vs. Western Kentucky*	Ford Field; Detroit, MI (Little Caesars Pizza Bowl)	ESPN	W 24–21	23,310
*Non-conference game; ^{†}Homecoming; Rankings from AP Poll released prior to the game; All times are in Eastern time

== Game summaries ==
=== Southeast Missouri State ===
	1	2	3	4	Total
Redhawks	10	14	3	0	27
Chippewas	10	14	7	7	38

=== Michigan State ===
	1	2	3	4	Total
#11 Spartans	7	17	10	7	41
Chippewas	0	0	0	7	7

=== @ Iowa ===
	1	2	3	4	Total
Chippewas	10	13	0	9	32
Hawkeyes	14	0	7	10	31

=== @ Northern Illinois ===
	1	2	3	4	Total
Chippewas	7	7	10	0	24
Huskies	14	10	10	21	55

=== @ Toledo ===
	1	2	3	4	Total
Chippewas	7	14	7	7	35
Rockets	10	7	14	19	50

=== Navy ===
	1	2	3	4	Total
Midshipmen	14	3	14	0	31
Chippewas	3	7	3	0	13

=== Ball State ===
	1	2	3	4	Total
Cardinals	7	17	7	10	41
Chippewas	0	10	7	13	30

=== Akron ===
	1	2	3	4	Total
Zips	7	0	0	7	14
Chippewas	14	0	14	7	35

=== Western Michigan ===
	1	2	3	4	Total
Broncos	0	14	0	28	42
Chippewas	6	7	10	8	31

=== @ Eastern Michigan ===
	1	2	3	4	Total
Chippewas	0	10	21	3	34
Eagles	14	0	7	10	31

=== Miami (OH) ===
	1	2	3	4	Total
RedHawks	7	0	3	6	16
Chippewas	7	14	0	9	30

=== @ Massachusetts ===
	1	2	3	4	Total
Chippewas	7	7	14	14	42
Minutemen	0	14	7	0	21

=== WKU–Little Caesars Pizza Bowl ===
	1	2	3	4	Total
Hilltoppers	7	7	7	0	21
Chippewas	14	3	0	7	24
