= 2012 UMass Minutemen football team =

American college football season

2012 UMass Minutemen football
- Conference: Mid-American Conference
- East Division
- Record: 1–11 (1–7 MAC)
- Head coach: Charley Molnar (1st season)
- Offensive coordinator: Mike Kruczek (1st season)
- Offensive scheme: Pro spread
- Defensive coordinator: Phil Elmassian (1st season)
- Base defense: 4–3
- Home stadium: Gillette Stadium

2012 Mid-American Conference football standings
	Conf.			Overall
Team	W		L	W		L
East Division
Kent State x	8	–	0	11	–	3
Bowling Green	6	–	2	8	–	5
Ohio	4	–	4	9	–	4
Buffalo	3	–	5	4	–	8
Miami (OH)	3	–	5	4	–	8
UMass	1	–	7	1	–	11
Akron	0	–	8	1	–	11
West Division
No. 22 Northern Illinois x$	8	–	0	12	–	2
Toledo	6	–	2	9	–	4
Ball State	6	–	2	9	–	4
Central Michigan	4	–	4	7	–	6
Western Michigan	2	–	6	4	–	8
Eastern Michigan	1	–	7	2	–	10
Championship: Northern Illinois 44, Kent State 37
$ – Conference champion and BCS representative as top non-AQ school to meet automatic qualification criteria; x – Division champion/co-champions; UMass not eligible for conference title or bowl game as part of FBS transition; Rankings from AP Poll

The 2012 UMass Minutemen football team represented the University of Massachusetts Amherst in the 2012 NCAA Division I FBS football season as a member of the Mid-American Conference. The team was coached by Charley Molnar and played its home games at Gillette Stadium in Foxborough, Massachusetts.

The 2012 season was the team's first as a member of the MAC, as they continued their transition to NCAA Division I FBS play. Because of this, they were ineligible to participate in the conference championship.

However, according to an August 2, 2012 ruling by the NCAA UMass would have been eligible to participate in a bowl game if they achieved at least 6 wins, and there were not enough spots to fill all bowl games.

The 2012 season was Charley Molnar's first as head coach of the Minutemen, previously serving as Offensive coordinator of the Notre Dame Fighting Irish.

The team would finish the season with a record of 1–11 overall with a Conference record of 1–7 which placed them in 6th place in the MAC East Division. At the end of the season three players were selected to All-MAC teams. Senior linebacker Perry McIntyre was named to the All-MAC First Team Defense, while senior safety Darren Thellen earned Second Team accolades. Punter Colter Johnson, a junior, was also honored as a Third Team selection.

== Schedule ==
Date	Time	Opponent	Site	TV	Result	Attendance
August 30	7:30 p.m.	at Connecticut*	Rentschler Field; East Hartford, CT (The U Game)	SNY/ESPN3	L 0–37	35,270
September 8	3:30 p.m.	Indiana*	Gillette Stadium; Foxborough, MA	ESPN3	L 6–45	16,304
September 15	3:30 p.m.	at No. 17 Michigan*	Michigan Stadium; Ann Arbor, MI	BTN	L 13–63	110,708
September 22	12:00 p.m.	at Miami (OH)	Yager Stadium; Oxford, OH	ESPN+	L 16–27	15,159
September 29	3:30 p.m.	Ohio	Gillette Stadium; Foxborough, MA	ESPN3	L 34–37	8,321
October 6	2:00 p.m.	at Western Michigan	Waldo Stadium; Kalamazoo, MI		L 14–52	15,671
October 20	12:00 p.m.	Bowling Green^{†}	Gillette Stadium; Foxborough, MA		L 0–24	10,846
October 27	7:00 p.m.	at Vanderbilt*	Vanderbilt Stadium; Nashville, TN	SECRN/NESN	L 7–49	32,227
November 3	3:30 p.m.	at Northern Illinois	Huskie Stadium; DeKalb, IL		L 0–63	11,114
November 10	2:00 p.m.	at Akron	InfoCision Stadium; Akron, OH		W 22–14	7,716
November 17	3:00 p.m.	Buffalo	Gillette Stadium; Foxborough, MA (rivalry)		L 19–29	12,649
November 23	3:00 p.m.	Central Michigan	Gillette Stadium; Foxborough, MA		L 21–42	6,385
*Non-conference game; ^{†}Homecoming; Rankings from AP Poll released prior to the game; All times are in Eastern time

== Game summaries ==
=== At Connecticut ===
	1	2	3	4	Total
Minutemen	0	0	0	0	0
Huskies	7	13	7	10	37

=== Indiana ===
	1	2	3	4	Total
Hoosiers	21	17	0	7	45
Minutemen	6	0	0	0	6

=== At No. 17 Michigan ===
	1	2	3	4	Total
Minutemen	0	13	0	0	13
No. 17 Wolverines	14	28	14	7	63

=== At Miami (Ohio) ===
	1	2	3	4	Total
Minutemen	0	3	7	6	16
RedHawks	0	14	7	6	27

=== Ohio ===
	1	2	3	4	Total
Bobcats	3	17	0	17	37
Minutemen	10	7	10	7	34

=== Western Michigan ===
	1	2	3	4	Total
Minutemen	0	7	0	7	14
Broncos	7	21	21	3	52

=== Bowling Green ===
	1	2	3	4	Total
Falcons	7	0	14	3	24
Minutemen	0	0	0	0	0

=== At Vanderbilt ===
	1	2	3	4	Total
Minutemen	0	0	0	7	7
Commodores	7	14	28	0	49

=== At Northern Illinois ===
	1	2	3	4	Total
Minutemen	0	0	0	0	0
Huskies	14	21	21	7	63

=== At Akron ===
	1	2	3	4	Total
Minutemen	3	12	0	7	22
Zips	0	0	7	7	14

=== Buffalo ===
	1	2	3	4	Total
Bulls	0	0	14	15	29
Minutemen	3	10	6	0	19

=== Central Michigan ===
	1	2	3	4	Total
Chippewas	7	7	14	14	42
Minutemen	0	14	7	0	21

== Team players selected in the 2013 NFL draft ==
NFL Draftees
Name	Position	Round	Pick	NFL team
Michael Cox	Running Back	7	253	New York Giants
