= 1986 Western Michigan Broncos football team =

American college football season

1986 Western Michigan Broncos football
- Conference: Mid-American Conference
- Record: 3–8 (3–5 MAC)
- Head coach: Jack Harbaugh (5th season)
- Offensive coordinator: Dan Ferrigno (2nd season)
- MVP: Mark Garalczyk
- Captains: Chris Conklin; Sam Culbert; Mark Garalczyk
- Home stadium: Waldo Stadium

1986 Mid-American Conference football standings
	Conf.					Overall
Team	W		L		T	W		L		T
Miami (OH) $	6	–	2	–	0	8	–	4	–	0
Toledo	5	–	3	–	0	7	–	4	–	0
Bowling Green	5	–	3	–	0	5	–	6	–	0
Kent State	5	–	3	–	0	5	–	6	–	0
Ball State	4	–	4	–	0	6	–	5	–	0
Eastern Michigan	4	–	4	–	0	6	–	5	–	0
Central Michigan	4	–	4	–	0	5	–	5	–	0
Western Michigan	3	–	5	–	0	3	–	8	–	0
Ohio	0	–	8	–	0	1	–	10	–	0
$ – Conference champion

The 1986 Western Michigan Broncos football team represented Western Michigan University in the Mid-American Conference (MAC) during the 1986 NCAA Division I-A football season. In their fifth and final season under head coach Jack Harbaugh, the Broncos compiled a 3–8 record (3–5 against MAC opponents), finished in eighth place in the MAC, and were outscored by their opponents, 257 to 183. The team played its home games at Waldo Stadium in Kalamazoo, Michigan.

The team's statistical leaders included Chris Conklin with 1,668 passing yards, Joe Glenn with 602 rushing yards, and Kelly Spielmaker with 575 receiving yards. Quarterback Chris Conklin, guard Sam Culbert, and defensive tackle Mark Garalczyk were the team captains. Garalczyk received the team's most outstanding player award; he was also selected as the MAC defensive player of the year.

On November 17, 1986, two days after the final game of the season, and despite winning three of the last five games, coach Harbaugh was fired. Harbaugh had compiled a record of 25–27–3. Michigan coach Bo Schembechler called Harbaugh's firing "one of the tragedies of sport", referred to the head coaching job at Western as "the worst job in America", and said that Western had "the worst-administered athletic department, maybe the worst-administered school."

== Schedule ==
Date	Opponent	Site	Result	Attendance	Source
September 6	at Eastern Michigan	Rynearson Stadium; Ypsilanti, MI	L 14–21		
September 13	Temple*	Waldo Stadium; Kalamazoo, MI	L 17–49	10,159	
September 20	Long Beach State*	Waldo Stadium; Kalamazoo, MI	L 13–14	10,089	
September 27	at No. 19 Michigan State*	Spartan Stadium; East Lansing, MI	L 10–45	65,907	
October 4	at Bowling Green	Doyt Perry Stadium; Bowling Green, OH	L 3–17	9,010	
October 11	at Central Michigan	Kelly/Shorts Stadium; Mount Pleasant, MI (rivalry)	L 10–18		
October 18	Miami (OH)	Waldo Stadium; Kalamazoo, MI	W 27–17	14,616	
October 25	at Ball State	Ball State Stadium; Muncie, IN	L 10–24		
November 1	at Toledo	Glass Bowl; Toledo, OH	L 7–28		
November 8	Ohio	Waldo Stadium; Kalamazoo, MI	W 45–17		
November 15	Kent State	Waldo Stadium; Kalamazoo, MI	W 27–7		
*Non-conference game; Rankings from AP Poll released prior to the game
