= 1986 Miami Redskins football team =

American college football season

1986 Miami Redskins football

MAC champion

California Bowl, L 7–37 vs. San Jose State
- Conference: Mid-American Conference
- Record: 8–4 (6–2 MAC)
- Head coach: Tim Rose (4th season)
- Defensive coordinator: Dean Pees (4th season)
- Home stadium: Yager Stadium

1986 Mid-American Conference football standings
	Conf.					Overall
Team	W		L		T	W		L		T
Miami (OH) $	6	–	2	–	0	8	–	4	–	0
Toledo	5	–	3	–	0	7	–	4	–	0
Bowling Green	5	–	3	–	0	5	–	6	–	0
Kent State	5	–	3	–	0	5	–	6	–	0
Ball State	4	–	4	–	0	6	–	5	–	0
Eastern Michigan	4	–	4	–	0	6	–	5	–	0
Central Michigan	4	–	4	–	0	5	–	5	–	0
Western Michigan	3	–	5	–	0	3	–	8	–	0
Ohio	0	–	8	–	0	1	–	10	–	0
$ – Conference champion

The 1986 Miami Redskins football team was an American football team that represented Miami University in the Mid-American Conference (MAC) during the 1986 NCAA Division I-A football season. In its fourth season under head coach Tim Rose, the team compiled an 8–4 record (6–2 against MAC opponents), won the MAC championship, outscored all opponents by a combined total of 346 to 228, and lost to San Jose State in the California Bowl.

The team's statistical leaders included Terry Morris with 2,365 passing yards, George Swarn with 1,112 rushing yards, and Andy Schillinger with 955 receiving yards.

== Schedule ==
Date	Opponent	Site	TV	Result	Attendance	Source
September 6	Ball State	Yager Stadium; Oxford, OH		W 45–7		
September 13	at Cincinnati*	Riverfront Stadium; Cincinnati, OH (rivalry)		L 38–45	23,709	
September 20	at No. 8 LSU*	Tiger Stadium; Baton Rouge, LA	TigerVision	W 21–12	75,777	
September 27	Bowling Green	Yager Stadium; Oxford, OH		W 24–7	24,056	
October 4	at Ohio	Peden Stadium; Athens, OH (rivalry)		W 34–14	12,500	
October 11	Toledo	Yager Stadium; Oxford, OH		W 24–8	16,629	
October 18	at Western Michigan	Waldo Stadium; Kalamazoo, MI		L 17–27	14,616	
October 25	at Northern Illinois*	Huskie Stadium; DeKalb, IL		W 20–6	13,128	
November 1	Central Michigan	Yager Stadium; Oxford, OH		W 59–21	27,840	
November 8	at Kent State	Dix Stadium; Kent, OH		L 23–24	11,500	
November 15	Eastern Michigan	Yager Stadium; Oxford, OH		W 34–20	14,792	
December 13	vs. San Jose State*	Bulldog Stadium; Fresno, CA (California Bowl)	ESPN	L 7–37	26,000	
*Non-conference game; Rankings from AP Poll released prior to the game
