= 1986 Eastern Michigan Hurons football team =

American college football season

1986 Eastern Michigan Hurons football
- Conference: Mid-American Conference
- Record: 6–5 (4–4 MAC)
- Head coach: Jim Harkema (4th season)
- Captain: Game captains
- Home stadium: Rynearson Stadium

1986 Mid-American Conference football standings
	Conf.					Overall
Team	W		L		T	W		L		T
Miami (OH) $	6	–	2	–	0	8	–	4	–	0
Toledo	5	–	3	–	0	7	–	4	–	0
Bowling Green	5	–	3	–	0	5	–	6	–	0
Kent State	5	–	3	–	0	5	–	6	–	0
Ball State	4	–	4	–	0	6	–	5	–	0
Eastern Michigan	4	–	4	–	0	6	–	5	–	0
Central Michigan	4	–	4	–	0	5	–	5	–	0
Western Michigan	3	–	5	–	0	3	–	8	–	0
Ohio	0	–	8	–	0	1	–	10	–	0
$ – Conference champion

The 1986 Eastern Michigan Hurons football team represented Eastern Michigan University in the 1986 NCAA Division I-A football season. In their fourth season under head coach Jim Harkema, the Hurons compiled a 6–5 record (4–4 against conference opponents), finished in a tie for fifth place in the Mid-American Conference, and were outscored by their opponents, 228 to 222. The team's statistical leaders included Ron Adams with 1,995 passing yards, Gary Patton with 1,058 rushing yards, and Don Vesling with 653 receiving yards.

== Schedule ==
Date	Opponent	Site	Result	Attendance	Source
September 6	Western Michigan	Rynearson Stadium; Ypsilanti, MI	W 21–14		
September 13	at Youngstown State*	Stambaugh Stadium; Youngstown, OH	W 18–17	8,507	
September 20	Akron*	Rynearson Stadium; Ypsilanti, MI	W 24–21	14,716	
September 27	Kent State	Rynearson Stadium; Ypsilanti, MI	L 16–20	18,764	
October 4	at Toledo	Glass Bowl; Toledo, OH	L 18–23	17,638	
October 11	at Bowling Green	Doyt Perry Stadium; Bowling Green, OH	L 10–24	17,212	
October 18	Ohio	Rynearson Stadium; Ypsilanti, MI	W 33–31		
October 25	Central Michigan	Rynearson Stadium; Ypsilanti, MI (rivalry)	W 34–16		
November 1	Ball State	Rynearson Stadium; Ypsilanti, MI	W 14–7		
November 8	at Northern Illinois*	Huskie Stadium; DeKalb, IL	L 14–21	8,556	
November 15	at Miami (OH)	Yager Stadium; Oxford, OH	L 20–34	14,792	
*Non-conference game
