= Tyler Jones =

American football player (born 1986)

Profile
- Positions: Wide receiver, quarterback

Personal information
- Born: January 2, 1986 (age 40)

Career information
- High school: Belleville (Belleville, Michigan)
- College: Eastern Michigan (2004–2008)

Awards and highlights
- NCAA single-game record 23 receptions

Tyler Ray Jones (born January 2, 1986) is an American former college football player for the Eastern Michigan Eagles. He spent time at quarterback, wide receiver, and tailback. In his final college game, he tied the NCAA single-game record for receptions with 23. Jones also played college basketball for the Eagles.

== Early life ==
Tyler Ray Jones was born on January 2, 1986. He played high school football and basketball at Belleville High School in Belleville, Michigan. He threw for 457 yards as a senior quarterback while also rushing for 465 yards and six touchdowns, earning first-team All-Area honors. Jones averaged 15.5 points, 7.5 rebounds, and 4.5 assists per game in basketball his senior year, garnering The Ann Arbor News Player of the Year recognition.

== College career ==
Jones enrolled at Eastern Michigan University to play college football for the Eagles. He redshirted the 2004 season. He began his college career as a punt protector but was moved to quarterback. Jones played in ten games, starting one after an injury to Matt Bohnet, in 2005, completing 41 of 65 passes (63.1%) for 245 yards, two touchdowns, and one interception while also rushing for 267 yards and one touchdown.

Jones competed with Andy Schmitt for the starting quarterback job in 2006. Jones appeared in ten games, starting five at quarterback and two at tailback, during the 2006 season, totaling 74 completions on 134 passing attempts (55.2%) for 754 yards, four touchdowns, nine interceptions, 310 rushing yards, four rushing touchdowns, and three receptions for four yards. He played in all 12 games as a wide receiver, quarterback, and running back in 2007, catching 29 passes for 341 yards and three touchdowns while also attempting three passes and running for 19 yards.

Jones played in all 12 games for the second straight year in 2008, catching 75 passes for 760 yards and six touchdowns, rushing for 145 yards, and throwing four incomplete passes. His six receiving touchdowns were the most on the team. The Ann Arbor News said that he played NCAA Football on PlayStation 3 and pitched ideas from the game to Eastern Michigan offensive coordinator Scott Isphording. In Jones' final college game on November 28, 2008, against Central Michigan, he tied Randy Gatewood's NCAA single-game receptions record by catching 23 passes for 170 yards in the 56–52 victory. Eastern Michigan quarterback Andy Schmitt also set the NCAA record for completions with 58.

Jones played college basketball for the Eagles during the 2007–08 and 2008–09 seasons as a guard. He appeared 51 games, starting 23, during his college basketball career, averaging 4.5 points, 2.1 rebounds, and 1.3 assists per game. He majored in marketing at Eastern Michigan.

== See also ==
- NCAA Division I FBS receiving leaders
- Eastern Michigan Eagles football statistical leaders
