= Sergio Bailey =

American football player (born 1994)

No. 83, 11
- Position: Wide receiver

Personal information
- Born: August 21, 1994 (age 32)
- Listed height: 6 ft 0 in (1.83 m)
- Listed weight: 186 lb (84 kg)

Career information
- High school: Olympian High School (Chula Vista, California)
- College: Grossmont; Eastern Michigan
- NFL draft: 2018: undrafted

Career history
- Tampa Bay Buccaneers (2018); Seattle Dragons (2020); Los Angeles Wildcats (2020)

Awards and highlights
- First-team All-MAC (2017)
- Stats at Pro Football Reference

Sergio Bailey II (born August 21, 1994) is an American former football wide receiver. He played college football at Eastern Michigan.

== Early life and high school career ==
Bailey grew up in San Diego with a single mother who worked "two, sometimes three jobs" and initially attended Helix High School in La Mesa before switching to Olympian High School in Chula Vista, where he could live with his godmother during the week. At Olympian, he was named offensive MVP of the football team for his junior and senior years.

== College career ==
Bailey enrolled at Grossmont College, where he earned first-team all-conference honors as a freshman and honorable mention accolades as a sophomore for the Griffins. He transferred to Eastern Michigan after his sophomore season in 2015. In his two seasons, and 25 games played at Eastern Michigan, Bailey racked up 1,746 receiving yards with 114 receptions and 16 touchdowns. In his senior year, he played 12 games, recording 54 receptions for a career-high 878 yards and nine touchdowns. He played in 13 games his junior year in 2016, leading all EMU receivers with 60 receptions for 868 yards and seven touchdowns.

== Professional career ==
=== Tampa Bay Buccaneers ===
Bailey was signed by Tampa Bay Buccaneers as an undrafted free agent on April 30, 2018. On August 26, 2018, he was placed on injured reserve after injuring his ankle during pre game warm up before the third pre season game against the Detroit Lions. He was waived on May 6, 2019.

=== Seattle Dragons ===
Bailey signed with the Seattle Dragons of the XFL on January 24, 2020. He was waived on February 25, 2020.

=== Los Angeles Wildcats ===
Bailey signed with the Los Angeles Wildcats on March 12, 2020. He had his contract terminated when the league suspended operations on April 10, 2020.

== Personal life ==
In 2020, he opened the Surf & Soul Spot restaurant in the College Area/La Mesa which he co-owns with a childhood friend who is a chef.
