= Andy Schmitt =

American football player (born 1987)

Profile
- Position: Quarterback

Personal information
- Born: February 16, 1987 (age 39)

Career information
- High school: St. Johns (St. Johns, Michigan)
- College: Eastern Michigan (2005–2009)

Awards and highlights
- NCAA single-game record 58 completions

Andrew William Schmitt (born February 16, 1987) is an American former college football quarterback who played for the Eastern Michigan Eagles. In 2008, he set the NCAA single-game record for completions with 58.

== Early life ==
Andrew William Schmitt was born on February 16, 1987. He played high school football at St. Johns High School in St. Johns, Michigan. As a senior in 2004, he threw for 1,933 yards and 25 touchdowns while also rushing for 865 yards and 10 touchdowns. Schmitt also lettered in basketball and track.

== College career ==
Schmitt enrolled at Eastern Michigan University to play college football for the Eagles. He redshirted the 2005 season. He played in nine games, starting seven, in 2006, completing 131 of 213 passes (61.5%) for 1,182 yards, two touchdowns, and six interceptions while running for 461 yards and four touchdowns. Schmitt appeared in 11 games, starting 10, in 2007 while missing one game due to injury. He finished the 2007 season with 164 completions on 255 attempts (64.3%) for 1,613 yards, 14 touchdowns, and six interceptions, 279 rushing yards, and six rushing touchdowns.

Schmitt had offseason shoulder surgery in 2008. He did not scamble as much during the 2008 season due to injuries. He played in 11 games, starting 10, overall while missing one game due to injury for the second straight year. Schmitt completed 261 of 417 passes (62.6%) for 2,644 yards, 15 touchdowns, and eight interceptions while also rushing for 171 yards and five touchdowns. On November 28, 2008, against Central Michigan, he completed 58 of 80 passes (72.5%) for 516 yards, five touchdowns and one interception while scoring a rushing touchdown in the 56–52 victory. His 58 completions set the NCAA single-game record. Eastern Michigan wide receiver Tyler Jones also set the NCAA record for receptions with 23. Schmitt's 516 passing yards during that game also broke his former school record of 484 yards.

Schmitt suffered a season-ending torn ACL in the third game of the 2009 season. He finished his college career with 607 completions on 966 attempts (62.8%) for 5,867 yards, 33 touchdowns, 25 interceptions, 878 rushing yards, and 16 rushing touchdowns.

== Coaching career ==
Schmitt became the head football coach at his alma mater, St. Johns High School, in 2019.

== See also ==
- NCAA Division I FBS passing leaders
- Eastern Michigan Eagles football statistical leaders
