= Ron Adams (American football) =

American football player (born 1966)

No. 10
- Position: Quarterback

Personal information
- Born: July 24, 1966 (age 60); Taylor, Michigan, U.S.
- Listed height: 5 ft 11 in (1.80 m)
- Listed weight: 210 lb (95 kg)

Career information
- High school: Center (Taylor)
- College: Eastern Michigan
- NFL draft: 1988: undrafted

Career history

Playing
- Detroit Drive (1991–1993); Tampa Bay Storm (1997–1999)

Coaching
- Taylor (MI) Center H.S. (AST) (1989–1992); Melvindale (MI) H.S. (AST) (1993–1997); Wyandotte (MI) H.S. (OC) (1998–2000); Taylor (MI) Truman H.S. (HC) (2001–2005); Wyandotte (MI) Rossevelt H.S. (HC) (2006–2021)

Awards and highlights
- ArenaBowl champion (1992); First-team All-MAC (1987); Second-team All-MAC (1986); Eastern Michigan Hall of Fame (1999); Michigan High School Football Coaches Hall of Fame

Career AFL statistics
- Comp. / Att.: 101 / 177
- Passing yards: 1,330
- TD–INT: 12–10
- QB rating: 74.35
- Rushing TD: 7
- Stats at ArenaFan.com

Ron Adams (born July 24, 1966) is an American former professional football quarterback for the Detroit Drive and Tampa Bay Storm of the Arena Football League (AFL). He played college football at Eastern Michigan.

== Early life ==
Adams attended Taylor Center High School in Taylor, Michigan.

== College career ==
Adams continued his football career at Eastern Michigan. Adams lead the Eagles to the 1987 Mid-American Conference (MAC) championship, and was twice named an All-MAC selection. He was inducted into the E-Club Athletic Hall of Fame in 1999.

=== Statistics ===
Adams' statistics are as follows:

Eastern Michigan Eagles
| Season | Games | Passing | | | | | | | Rushing | | | |
| Season | Games | Comp | Att | Yards | Pct. | TD | Int | QB rating | Att | Yards | Avg | TD |
| 1984 | 5 | 15 | 35 | 258 | 42.9 | 2 | 2 | 112.2 | 5 | 14 | 3.6 | 0 |
| 1985 | 8 | 91 | 167 | 997 | 54.5 | 5 | 11 | 100.3 | 49 | −10 | −0.2 | 0 |
| 1986 | 11 | 151 | 251 | 1,995 | 60.2 | 13 | 6 | 139.2 | 78 | 50 | 0.6 | 0 |
| 1987 | 12 | 107 | 202 | 1,527 | 53.0 | 6 | 9 | 117.4 | 100 | 425 | 4.3 | 6 |
| Career | 36 | 364 | 655 | 4,757 | 55.6 | 26 | 28 | 121.1 | 241 | 502 | 2.1 | 6 |

== Professional career ==
He played for the Detroit Drive of the Arena Football League from 1991 to 1993. He served as a backup quarterback, starting a few games during the 1992 ArenaBowl Championship season.

Adams came back to arena football in 1997 with the Tampa Bay Storm. Adams spent 3 seasons as the backup quarterback.

== Coaching career ==
Adams coached for 24 years, serving as a head coach for 13 of those years, even serving as the head coach at Theodore Roosevelt High School in Wyandotte, Michigan. He was inducted into the Michigan High School Football Association's Coaches Hall of Fame.
