= Brogan Roback =

American football player (born 1994)

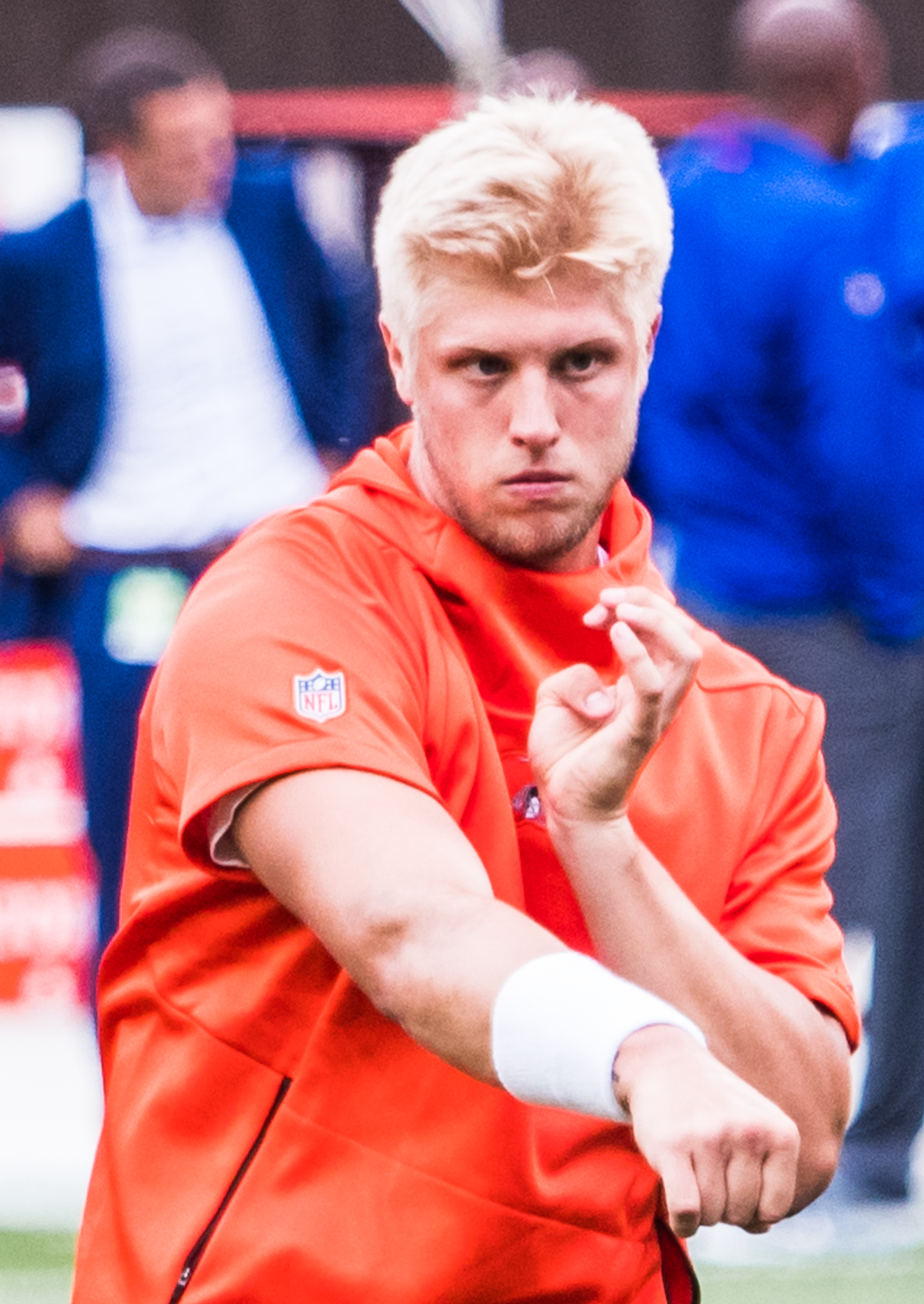
- Roback with the Cleveland Browns in 2018

No. 3, 6, 11, 4
- Position: Quarterback

Personal information
- Born: August 29, 1994 (age 32); Maumee, Ohio, U.S.
- Listed height: 6 ft 3 in (1.91 m)
- Listed weight: 215 lb (98 kg)

Career information
- High school: St. John's Jesuit (Toledo, Ohio)
- College: Eastern Michigan
- NFL draft: 2018: undrafted

Career history
- Cleveland Browns (2018)*; Pittsburgh Steelers (2019)*; St. Louis BattleHawks (2020)*; Dallas Renegades (2020); Team 9 (2020)*; Dallas Renegades (2020)
- * Offseason or practice squad member only
- Stats at Pro Football Reference

Brogan William Roback (born August 24, 1994) is an American former professional football player who was a quarterback in the National Football League (NFL). He played college football for the Eastern Michigan Eagles.

== College career ==
Roback played college football at Eastern Michigan University, where he saw action in 46 games with 745 completions for 8,653 yards and 57 touchdowns. Roback also saw action as a punter at Eastern Michigan.

== Professional career ==
Pre-draft measurables
Height	Weight	Arm length	Hand span	40-yard dash	10-yard split	20-yard split	20-yard shuttle	Three-cone drill	Vertical jump	Broad jump
6 ft 2 7/8 in (1.90 m)	213 lb (97 kg)	30 in (0.76 m)	9 3/4 in (0.25 m)	5.03 s	1.76 s	2.88 s	4.45 s	7.50 s	30.0 in (0.76 m)	9 ft 5 in (2.87 m)
All values from Pro Day

=== Cleveland Browns ===
Roback signed with the Cleveland Browns as an undrafted free agent on May 14, 2018. He was released on August 31, 2018. He was featured on HBO's Hard Knocks during his time with the Browns.

=== Pittsburgh Steelers ===
Roback signed a reserve/future contract with the Pittsburgh Steelers on January 3, 2019. He was waived on May 13, 2019.

=== St. Louis BattleHawks ===
Roback was selected in the second round of Phase 1 of the 2020 XFL draft by the St. Louis BattleHawks. He was waived on January 27, 2020.

=== Dallas Renegades ===
On February 11, 2020, Roback was signed by the Dallas Renegades. He was waived on February 19. He was added to the XFL's Team 9 practice squad, and re-signed with the Renegades on February 24. He had his contract terminated when the league suspended operations on April 10, 2020.
