= 2012 Eastern Michigan Eagles football team =

American college football season

2012 Eastern Michigan Eagles football
- Conference: Mid-American Conference
- West Division
- Record: 2–10 (1–7 MAC)
- Head coach: Ron English (4th season)
- Offensive coordinator: Ken Karcher (4th season)
- Offensive scheme: Multiple
- Defensive coordinator: Phil Snow (3rd season)
- Base defense: 4–3
- Home stadium: Rynearson Stadium

2012 Mid-American Conference football standings
	Conf.			Overall
Team	W		L	W		L
East Division
Kent State x	8	–	0	11	–	3
Bowling Green	6	–	2	8	–	5
Ohio	4	–	4	9	–	4
Buffalo	3	–	5	4	–	8
Miami (OH)	3	–	5	4	–	8
UMass	1	–	7	1	–	11
Akron	0	–	8	1	–	11
West Division
No. 22 Northern Illinois x$	8	–	0	12	–	2
Toledo	6	–	2	9	–	4
Ball State	6	–	2	9	–	4
Central Michigan	4	–	4	7	–	6
Western Michigan	2	–	6	4	–	8
Eastern Michigan	1	–	7	2	–	10
Championship: Northern Illinois 44, Kent State 37
$ – Conference champion and BCS representative as top non-AQ school to meet automatic qualification criteria; x – Division champion/co-champions; UMass not eligible for conference title or bowl game as part of FBS transition; Rankings from AP Poll

The 2012 Eastern Michigan Eagles football team represented Eastern Michigan University in the 2012 NCAA Division I FBS football season. They were led by fourth year head coach Ron English and played their home games at Rynearson Stadium. They are a member of the West Division of the Mid-American Conference. They finished the season 2–10, 1–7 in MAC play to finish in last place in the West Division.

== Schedule ==
Date	Time	Opponent	Site	TV	Result	Attendance
August 30	7:00 pm	at Ball State	Scheumann Stadium; Muncie, IN	ESPN3	L 26–37	12,725
September 8	1:00 pm	No. 18 (FCS) Illinois State*	Rynearson Stadium; Ypsilanti, MI	CSNC	L 14–31	7,654
September 15	12:00 pm	at Purdue*	Ross–Ade Stadium; West Lafayette, IN	BTN	L 16–54	40,217
September 22	3:30 pm	at No. 21 Michigan State*	Spartan Stadium; East Lansing, MI	BTN	L 7–23	74,204
October 6	1:00 pm	Kent State^{†}	Rynearson Stadium; Ypsilanti, MI		L 14–41	6,011
October 13	1:00 pm	Toledo	Rynearson Stadium; Ypsilanti, MI		L 47–52	2,837
October 20	1:00 pm	Army*	Rynearson Stadium; Ypsilanti, MI	ESPN3	W 48–38	4,252
October 27	3:30 pm	at Bowling Green	Doyt Perry Stadium; Bowling Green, OH	BCSN/ESPN3	L 3–24	13,158
November 1	6:00 pm	at Ohio	Peden Stadium; Athens, OH	ESPNU	L 14–45	16,789
November 10	1:00 pm	Central Michigan	Rynearson Stadium; Ypsilanti, MI (rivalry)		L 31–34	4,081
November 17	2:00 pm	at Western Michigan	Waldo Stadium; Kalamazoo, MI (Michigan MAC Trophy)		W 29–23	10,338
November 23	1:00 pm	No. 24 Northern Illinois	Rynearson Stadium; Ypsilanti, MI	ESPN3	L 7–49	1,349
*Non-conference game; ^{†}Homecoming; Rankings from AP Poll released prior to the game; All times are in Eastern time

- Source: Schedule

== Game summaries ==
=== @ Ball State ===
	1	2	3	4	Total
Eagles	0	13	0	13	26
Cardinals	10	3	21	3	37

=== Illinois State ===
	1	2	3	4	Total
Redbirds	10	0	14	7	31
Eagles	0	14	0	0	14

=== @ Purdue ===
	1	2	3	4	Total
Eagles	0	9	0	7	16
Boilermakers	13	20	7	14	54

=== @ Michigan State ===
	1	2	3	4	Total
Eagles	0	7	0	0	7
#20 Spartans	0	3	6	14	23

=== Kent State ===
	1	2	3	4	Total
Golden Flashes	3	14	21	3	41
Eagles	0	7	0	7	14

=== Toledo ===
	1	2	3	4	Total
Rockets	7	14	28	3	52
Eagles	10	0	27	10	47

=== Army ===
	1	2	3	4	Total
Black Knights	10	7	7	14	38
Eagles	14	14	3	17	48

=== @ Bowling Green ===
	1	2	3	4	Total
Eagles	3	0	0	0	3
Falcons	14	0	7	3	24

=== @ Ohio ===
	1	2	3	4	Total
Eagles	7	7	0	0	14
Bobcats	7	17	7	14	45

=== Central Michigan ===
	1	2	3	4	Total
Chippewas	0	10	21	3	34
Eagles	14	0	7	10	31

=== @ Western Michigan ===
	1	2	3	4	Total
Eagles	14	3	9	3	29
Broncos	0	14	3	6	23

=== Northern Illinois ===
	1	2	3	4	Total
Huskies	14	14	7	14	49
Eagles	7	0	0	0	7
