= Walter Church (American football) =

American football player (born 1978)

Profile
- Position: Quarterback

Personal information
- Born: July 23, 1978 (age 48); Ypsilanti, Michigan, U.S.
- Listed height: 6 ft 2 in (1.88 m)
- Listed weight: 230 lb (104 kg)

Career information
- High school: Ypsilanti (MI)
- College: Eastern Michigan
- NFL draft: 2001: undrafted

Career history
- Peoria Pirates (2002); New York Dragons (2003); Dallas Desperados (2004); Arkansas Twisters (2006)

Awards and highlights
- ArenaCup champion (2002); Yipsilanti Athletic Hall of Fame (2009)

Career AFL statistics
- Comp. / Att.: 55 / 99
- Passing yards: 766
- TD–INT: 12–7
- QB rating: 81.46
- Rushing TD: 1
- Stats at ArenaFan.com

Walter Church (born July 23, 1978) is an American former football quarterback for the New York Dragons and Dallas Desperados of the Arena Football League (AFL). He played college football at Eastern Michigan.

== Early life ==
Church attended Ypsilanti High School in Ypsilanti, Michigan.

== College career ==
Church continued his football career at Eastern Michigan. He threw for 9,142 yards, 43 touchdowns, and 46 interceptions. Church still holds school records for most passing yards and total yards in a career.

== Professional career ==
Church was rated the 27th best quarterback in the 2001 NFL draft by NFLDraftScout.com.

Pre-draft measurables
Height	Weight	40-yard dash	Wonderlic
6 ft 3 in (1.91 m)	218 lb (99 kg)	5.10 s	32
All values from Eastern Michigan Pro Day

Church led the Peoria Pirates to the ArenaCup title in 2002.

He played for the New York Dragons of the Arena Football League (AFL) in 2003.

Church served as a backup in 2004 with the Dallas Desperados of the AFL.

Church played for the Arkansas Twisters of the af2 in 2006 and retired after the season.

== Career statistics ==
=== AFL ===
Year	Team	Passing							Rushing		
Year	Team	Cmp	Att	Pct	Yds	TD	Int	Rtg	Att	Yds	TD
2003	New York	12	24	50.0	203	4	3	78.99	1	-1	0
2004	Dallas	43	75	57.3	563	8	4	85.58	3	-2	1
Career		55	99	55.6	766	12	7	81.46	4	-3	1

=== College ===
Eastern Michigan Eagles
Season	Games	Passing							Rushing			
Season	Games	Comp	Att	Yards	Pct.	TD	Int	QB rating	Att	Yards	Avg	TD
1996	10	178	355	2,151	50.1	11	14	103.4	71	-251	-3.5	0
1997	Injured											
1998	9	213	355	2,650	60.0	13	12	125.0	51	-95	-1.9	1
1999	10	178	332	2,015	53.6	8	12	105.3	67	-78	-1.2	2
2000	11	238	399	2,326	59.6	11	9	113.7	27	-90	-3.3	0
Career	40	807	1,441	9,142	56.0	43	46	112.8	216	-514	-2.4	3
