= 2019 Frisco Bowl =

Postseason college football bowl game

2019 Tropical Smoothie Cafe Frisco Bowl
- 3rd Frisco Bowl
Utah State Aggies	Kent State Golden Flashes
(7–5)	(6–6)
Mountain West	MAC
41	51
Head coach: Gary Andersen	Head coach: Sean Lewis
	1	2	3	4	Total
Utah State	10	7	10	14	41
Kent State	17	6	3	25	51
- Date: December 20, 2019
- Season: 2019
- Stadium: Toyota Stadium
- Location: Frisco, Texas
- MVP: Dustin Crum (QB, Kent State) & Qwuantrezz Knight (DB, Kent State)
- Favorite: Utah State by 7
- Referee: Ken Antee (C-USA)
- Attendance: 12,120
- Payout: US$650,000

United States TV coverage
- Network: ESPN2
- Announcers: Anish Shroff (play-by-play), John Congemi (analyst), Kris Budden (sideline)

The 2019 Frisco Bowl was a college football bowl game played on December 20, 2019, with kickoff at 7:30 p.m. EST (6:30 p.m. local CST) on ESPN2. It was the 3rd edition of the Frisco Bowl, and one of the 2019–20 bowl games concluding the 2019 FBS football season. Sponsored by restaurant franchise Tropical Smoothie Cafe, the game was officially known as the Tropical Smoothie Cafe Frisco Bowl.

== Teams ==
The bowl matched the Utah State Aggies of the Mountain West Conference and Kent State Golden Flashes of the Mid-American Conference (MAC). This was the teams' third meeting; the all-time series had been tied at 1–1. Their most recent meeting had seen Utah State defeat Kent State by a score of 27–24 on October 19, 1974, at Kent State.

=== Utah State Aggies ===
Utah State completed their regular season with a 7–5 record (6–2 in conference), finishing in third place in the Mountain Division of Mountain West. This was the Aggies' 13th bowl game in program history, and eighth bowl appearance in nine seasons.

=== Kent State Golden Flashes ===
Kent State finished their regular season at 6–6 (5–3 in conference), in a three-way tie for second place in the East Division of the MAC. This was the fourth bowl game in school history, as the Golden Flashes were seeking their first-ever bowl win after losing the previous three. It was also Kent State's first bowl game since the 2013 GoDaddy.com Bowl, where their 2012 team lost to Arkansas State, 17–13.

== Game summary ==
2019 Tropical Smoothie Cafe Frisco Bowl

Quarter	1	2	3	4	Total
Utah State	10	7	10	14	41
Kent State	17	6	3	25	51

at Toyota Stadium • Frisco, Texas

- Date: Friday, December 20, 2019
- Game time: 7:30 p.m. EST (6:30 p.m. CST)
- Game weather: Cloudy • Temperature: 48 °F (9 °C) • Wind: SE 8 mph
- Game attendance: 12,120
- Referee: Ken Antee
- TV announcers (ESPN2): Anish Shroff (play-by-play), John Congemi (analyst) and Kris Budden (sideline)
- ESPN game summary

Game information

First Quarter

- (12:02) USU – Gerold Bright 4 yard rush, Dominik Eberle kick (Drive: 10 plays, 75 yards, 2:58; Utah State 7–0)
- (11:10) KENT – Dustin Crum 78 yard pass to Isaiah McCoy, Matthew Trickett kick (Drive: 3 plays, 81 yards, 0:43; Tied 7–7)
- (5:37) KENT – Xavier Williams 2 yard rush, Matthew Trickett kick (Drive: 12 plays, 77 yards, 4:23; Kent State 14–7)
- (2:50) KENT – Matthew Trickett 40 yard field goal (Drive: 6 plays, 20 yards, 2:08; Kent State 17–7)
- (0:03) USU – Dominik Eberle 41 yard field goal (Drive: 6 plays, 46 yards, 2:40; Kent State 17–10)

Second Quarter

- (8:24) USU – Jordan Love 25 yard pass to Siaosi Mariner, Dominik Eberle kick (Drive: 8 plays, 68 yards, 2:36; Tied 17–17)
- (5:07) KENT – Matthew Trickett 22 yard field goal (Drive: 4 plays, 3 yards, 1:33; Kent State 20–17)
- (0:00) KENT – Matthew Trickett 36 yard field goal (Drive: 8 plays, 67 yards, 0:58; Kent State 23–17)

Third Quarter

- (11:41) KENT – Matthew Trickett 29 yard field goal (Drive: 8 plays, 41 yards, 3:11; Kent State 26–17)
- (7:52) USU – Jordan Love 17 yard pass to Deven Thompkins, Dominik Eberle kick (Drive: 13 plays, 75 yards, 3:49; Kent State 26–24)
- (2:27) USU – Dominik Eberle 45 yard field goal (Drive: 9 plays, 44 yards, 3:31; Utah State 27–26)

Fourth Quarter

- (13:31) KENT – Will Matthews 4 yard rush, 2-point rush good (Drive: 2 plays, 57 yards, 0:26; Kent State 34–27)
- (12:48) USU – Deven Thompkins 57 yard rush, Dominik Eberle kick (Drive: 3 plays, 58 yards, 0:40; Tied 34–34)
- (9:36) KENT – Dustin Crum 1 yard pass to Antwan Dixon, Matthew Trickett kick (Drive: 8 plays, 64 yards, 3:09; Kent State 41–34)
- (4:56) KENT – Matthew Trickett 37 yard field goal (Drive: 8 plays, 24 yards, 3:50; Kent State 44–34)
- (3:06) USU – Jordan Love 11 yard pass to Siaosi Mariner, Dominik Eberle kick (Drive: 8 plays, 75 yards, 1:50; Kent State 44–41)
- (1:56) KENT – Dustin Crum 4 yard rush, Matthew Trickett kick (Drive: 4 plays, 13 yards, 1:01; Kent State 51–41)

=== Statistics ===
Statistics	USU	KENT
First downs	30	26
Plays–yards	79–506	83–550
Rushes–yards	40–189	56–252
Passing yards	317	298
Passing: comp–att–int	30–39–1	22–27–0
Time of possession	27:42	32:18

Team	Category	Player	Statistics
Utah State	Passing	Jordan Love	30/39, 317 yards, 3 TD, 1 INT
Utah State	Rushing	Gerold Bright	21 carries, 94 yards, 1 TD
Utah State	Receiving	Siaosi Mariner	7 receptions, 113 yards, 2 TD
Kent State	Passing	Dustin Crum	21/26, 289 yards, 2 TD
Kent State	Rushing	Dustin Crum	23 carries, 147 yards, 1 TD
Kent State	Receiving	Isaiah McKoy	6 receptions, 103 yards, 1 TD
