= Kent State Golden Flashes football =

Varsity intercollegiate athletic team

2026 Kent State Golden Flashes football team
- First season: 1920; 106 years ago
- Athletic director: Randale Richmond
- Head coach: Mark Carney; 1st season, 5–7 (.417)
- Location: Kent, Ohio
- Stadium: Dix Stadium (capacity: 27,363)
- NCAA division: Division I FBS
- Conference: MAC
- Colors: Navy blue and gold
- All-time record: 371–614–28 (.380)
- Bowl record: 1–4 (.200)

Conference championships
- MAC: 1972

Division championships
- MAC East: 2012, 2021
- Consensus All-Americans: 1
- Rivalries: Akron (rivalry); Bowling Green (rivalry)

Uniforms
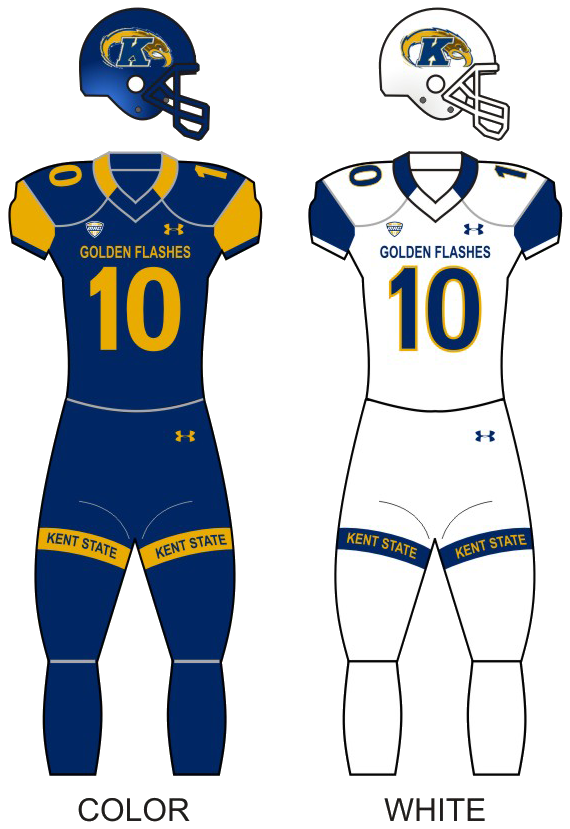
- Fight song: Fight on for KSU
- Mascot: Flash
- Marching band: Marching Golden Flashes
- Outfitter: Under Armour
- Website: KentStateSports.com

The Kent State Golden Flashes football team is a varsity intercollegiate athletic team of Kent State University in Kent, Ohio. The team is a member of the Mid-American Conference East division, and competes in the National Collegiate Athletic Association (NCAA) at the Division I level in the Football Bowl Subdivision (FBS). The Golden Flashes played their first game in 1920 and since 1969 have played their home games at Dix Stadium. Kent State is coached by head coach Mark Carney.

== History ==
=== Early history (1920–1970) ===
The first attempt to establish a football team was in 1914, one year after the first classes were held on campus and four years after the school was founded in 1910. The team played two practice games against local high schools, but was discontinued by the athletic board and faculty to focus on basketball season. While there was hope the team would return for the 1915 season, no team was established until 1920. The team played their first game October 30, 1920, against Ashland College, a 6–0 loss under coach Paul Chandler. The first Kent State home football game was held November 6, a 7–0 loss to sister school Bowling Green. The final game of the season was a home game scheduled against St. Ignatius College of Cleveland, but the game was not played and counted as a forfeit win for Kent. The team would not record their first true victory until November 14, 1925, a 7–6 win over West Liberty State College. Outside the forfeited win in 1920, Kent State would fail to score in their first 14 games, posting a record of 0–13–1 before finally putting points on the board in a 7–6 loss to West Liberty in 1923. During that streak, Kent State would suffer the worst loss in school history, a 118–0 loss to Baldwin–Wallace College, also in 1923. Following the 7–6 loss to West Liberty, a new shutout streak began which lasted 8 games, in which the Flashes, then known as the "Silver Foxes" went 0–6–2. The streak began with the second most lopsided loss in school history, an 82–0 loss to Slippery Rock. The streak finally ended with a 6–6 tie with the Indiana Normal School in 1925, the game which preceded Kent State's first true victory. Kent State posted their first winning season in 1928, going 4–2–2.

Kent State joined the Ohio Athletic Conference beginning in the 1931 season, playing in the OAC through the 1950 season except for the 1943–1945 seasons, which were canceled due to American involvement in World War II. Under coach Donald Starn, who coached Kent State from 1935 to 1942, the Flashes began to taste success, posting winning seasons in 1938 (6–2), 1940 (8–1), and 1942 (5–3). During their time in the OAC, the Flashes never won a conference title, but did finish second in 1940 with a 4–0 conference record. The team finished third in both 1948 and 1949, going 3–0 and 2–0 respectively in conference play.

In 1946, the program was revived after the conclusion of World War II under head coach Trevor J. Rees, who would coach the Flashes to their first era of consistent success. During his tenure, which lasted 18 seasons, the Flashes would post winning seasons in all but 5 of them, 3 of which were the 1961-1963 seasons. In 1950, the team opened their first true stadium, Memorial Stadium, by defeating Marietta College 57–0. The next season saw the Golden Flashes join the Mid-American Conference. Rees coached Kent State from 1946–1963, posting a record of 92–63–5 (.591), and guided the team to its first bowl appearance in the 1954 Refrigerator Bowl. He retired as Kent State head coach following the 1963 season.

Leo Strang took over for Rees in 1964 inheriting a program that had won only eight games the prior three seasons and had endured a seven game losing streak. He compiled a 16-21-2 record over his 4 year tenure, a .436 win/loss percentage. Since 1967, only one other Kent coach with an equal or longer tenure has had a better win/loss percentage. He had Kent's first winning season in a five years (1965 season)—which was its first at the major college level—and had its longest unbeaten streak since 1956. Strang resigned following the 1967 season, winning his last three games against Louisville, Marshall, and Xavier. Washington University head coach Dave Puddington was hired to replace Strang, and Kent State struggled. The program posted a 9–21 record during Puddington's three seasons, the best of which was a 5–5 campaign in 1969. During the 1969 season, the Flashes also moved into Dix Stadium, which was not fully completed until January 1970. The Puddington tenure was also marked by the Kent State shootings in May 1970, when the Ohio National Guard opened fire on a group of university students, killing four and injuring nine. Puddington was fired after the 1970 season.

=== Don James era (1971–1974) ===
In 1971, Don James took over as head coach. Under James, and with notable players such as Pro Football Hall of Fame inductee and former Pittsburgh Steelers middle linebacker Jack Lambert, Alabama Crimson Tide football coach Nick Saban, and former Missouri Tigers football coach Gary Pinkel, Kent State was finally able to celebrate its first—and so far only—Mid-American Conference title in 1972 followed by a trip to the 1972 Tangerine Bowl.

James coached at Kent State four seasons (1971–1974), posting an overall record of 25–19–1 (.567) which included a 9–2 record in 1973. James left after the 1974 season to accept the head coaching job at Washington.

=== Coaching succession ===
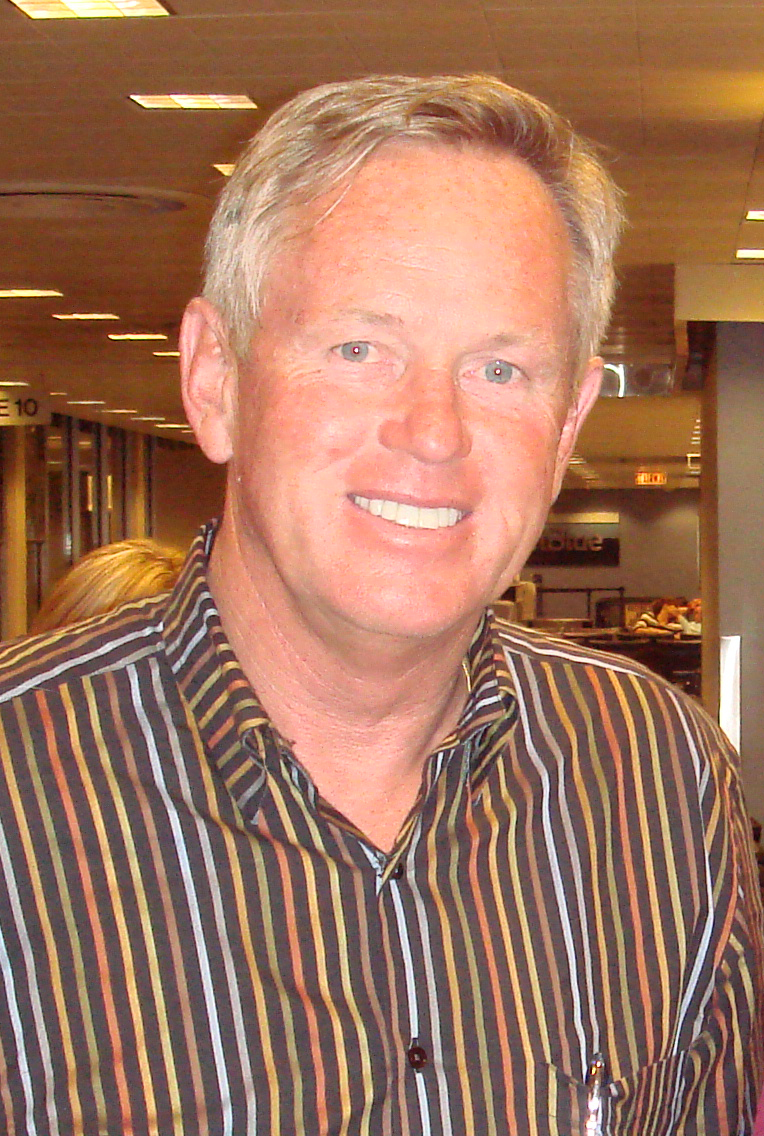
Glen Mason, coach of the Flashes for the 1986 and 1987 seasons

Following the departure of Don James, Kent State went through a period marked by mostly losing seasons and regular coaching changes, with no coaching tenure lasting more than three seasons until 1997. Dennis Fitzgerald, who was promoted from defensive coordinator to head coach after James' departure, was able to lead the team to an 8–4 record and second-place MAC finish in 1976 and a winning 1977 season, Fitzgerald was able to continue James' success within the Kent State football program, but left the program after the 1977 season.

Ron Blackledge was promoted from offensive coordinator to head coach following Fitzgerald's departure. Kent State's struggles continued, with the Golden Flashes posting records of 4–7, 1–10 and 3–8 for a total mark of 8–25. Blackledge was fired following the 1980 season.

Succeeding Blackledge was Boston College head coach Ed Chlebek. Chelebek has previously turned around the BC football program and was expected to do the same at Kent State. Unfortunately, he couldn't. The Golden Flashes followed a 4–7 campaign in 1981 with a winless 0–11 season in 1982. Chlebek was fired following the 1982 season.

Utah offensive line coach Dick Scesniak was hired as Chlebek's replacement and, once again, Kent State's football struggles persisted. Scesniak's teams posted records of 1–10, 4–7 and 3–8 for a total of 8–25. Scesniak died of a heart attack on April 1, 1986.

Ohio State offensive coordinator Glen Mason was hired as Kent State's head coach in 1986. In his two seasons in Kent posted two consecutive 2nd place MAC finishes including a 7–4 overall mark in 1987, the Flashes' first winning season since 1977. Following the 1987 season, Mason was hired by the Kansas Jayhawks. Kent State alumnus Nick Saban, the defensive coordinator at Michigan State from 1983–87, was a finalist to succeed Mason, but he didn't get the position.

Former North Carolina head coach Dick Crum was hired to replace Mason. Despite high hopes for his tenure, Crum's Golden Flashes never put together a winning season in three years, compiling a record of 7–26. Crum was fired following the 1990 season.

=== Improvements and stability ===
Former Flashes standout Jim Corrigall began in 1994 and became the first coach since Don James to coach more than three seasons, lasting four. Although some progress was made, the Golden Flashes best season under Corrigall, a 3–8 campaign, proved to be his last in 1997. Three wins in 1997 were the most wins for Kent State since 1988. Corrigall had an overall record of 8–35–1 in four seasons.

Dean Pees was hired in 1998 and suffered through the Flashes' most recent winless season (0–11 in 1998) before leading the team to a slow recovery. In 2001 Kent State posted their first winning season since 1987 when they were led by quarterback Joshua Cribbs to a 6–5 overall record, 5–3 in the MAC. Pees left Kent State after the 2003 season to take the defensive coordinator job with the New England Patriots of the National Football League (NFL) under head coach Bill Belichick.

Coach Doug Martin was promoted from offensive coordinator and began his tenure as head coach in 2004. His best season was the 2006 season, which saw Kent State go 6–6 overall and 5–3 in the MAC, finishing second in the East division. Kent State began the 2010 season with hopes of contending for a MAC title, but early losses at Miami and Toledo ended any hope for a title. The team did record its first-ever sell-out at Dix Stadium on October 9 when a crowd of 24,211 watched the Flashes defeat the arch-rival Akron Zips 28–17 to reclaim the Wagon Wheel.

In the days following a 38–3 loss at Western Michigan, which dropped the team's record to 4–7 and 3–4 in the MAC, Doug Martin announced his resignation, effective at the conclusion of the season. The team responded with a 28–6 upset win over the first-place Ohio Bobcats at Dix Stadium to finish with a record of 5–7 overall and 4–4 in the MAC. Martin finished his tenure with a record of 29–53 (.354) overall and 21–35 (.375) in the MAC.

=== Darrell Hazell era (2010–2012) ===
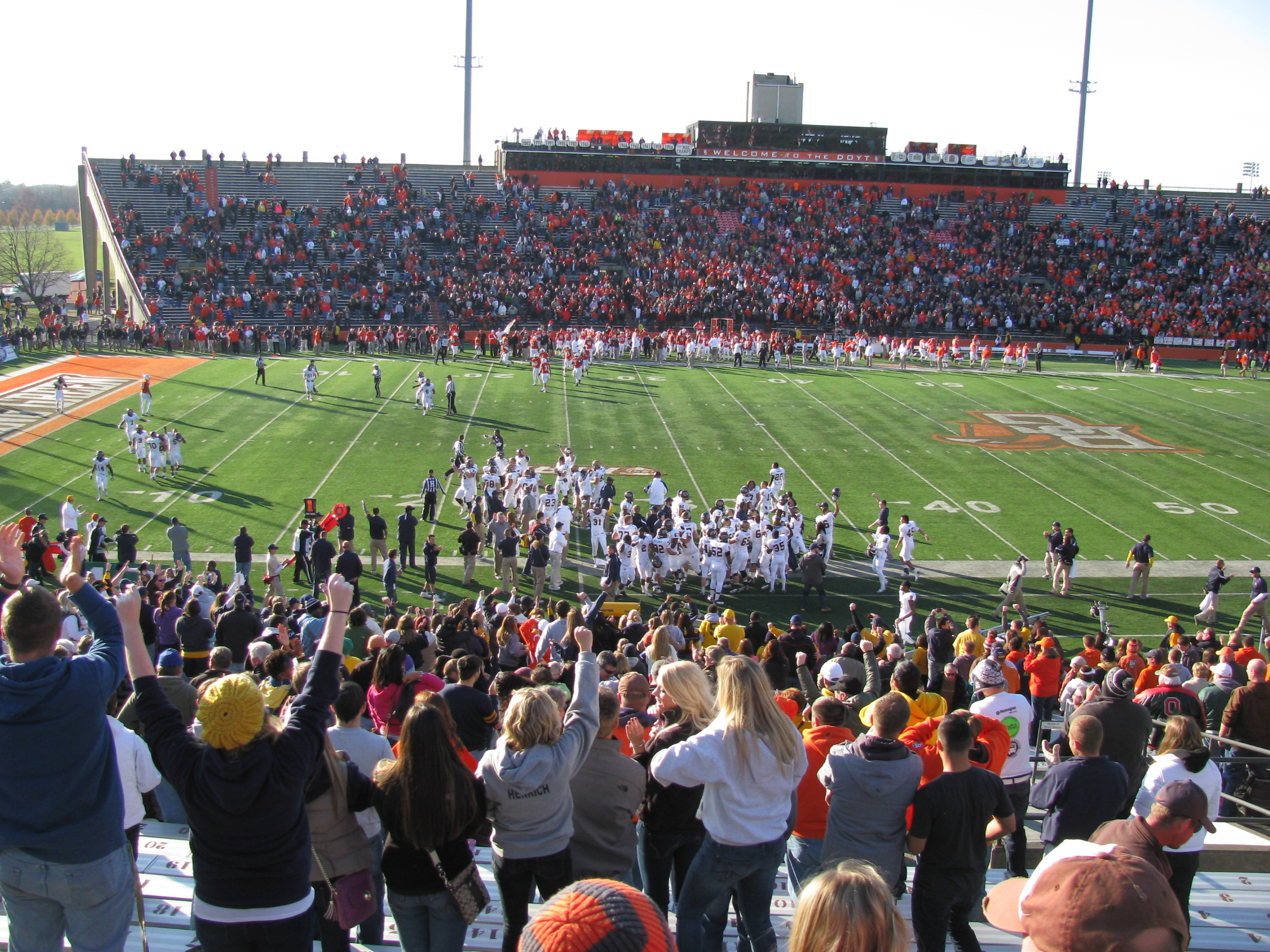
Kent State players and fans celebrate near the end of the Flashes 31–24 victory over the Falcons at Doyt Perry Stadium that clinched the 2012 MAC East title

Ohio State wide receivers coach Darrell Hazell was hired to replace Martin. Hazell was the first African American head football coach in the history of Kent State football.

In Hazell's first season, 2011, the team had two three-game losing streaks, but also had a five-game winning streak in the latter half of the season. Kent State dropped their first three contests, which included losses at eventual BCS national champion Alabama and Kansas State and a home loss to Louisiana-Lafayette. Hazell's first win at Kent State came on September 24, in a 33–25 win over South Alabama at Dix Stadium. The team then dropped their first three MAC games before defeating Bowling Green, which was the start of a five-game winning streak that included a 35–3 win over arch-rival Akron at InfoCision Stadium – Summa Field, Kent State's first win in Akron since 2003. The season ended with a 34–16 loss at Temple. The Flashes finished third in the MAC East with a 5–7 record overall and 4–4 in the MAC.

The 2012 season began with a 41–21 win over Towson at Dix Stadium, followed by a 47–14 loss at Kentucky. Following the loss, the Flashes defeated Buffalo at University at Buffalo Stadium and followed that with a come-from-behind 45–43 win over Ball State in Kent. A 31–17 win over Army at Michie Stadium was the first victory for Kent State over a non-conference team on the road since 2007. The winning streak reached six, the longest for Kent State since 1940, after a 35–23 win over undefeated and 18th-ranked Rutgers at High Point Solutions Stadium. The win was the Flashes' first over a ranked opponent after entering the game 0–22 against ranked teams. The win earned Kent State votes in the October 28, 2012 AP Poll, Coaches' Poll, and the Harris Interactive College Football Poll. The team continued winning, beating Akron in the Battle for the Wagon Wheel game at Dix Stadium, followed by a 48–32 win over the Miami RedHawks at Yager Stadium. The win over Miami set a new team record for consecutive victories in a season at eight and tied the 1973 team for most wins in a season at nine. On November 11, the Flashes were ranked 25th in the weekly AP poll, their first time being ranked since November 5, 1973, when they were ranked 19th for one week.

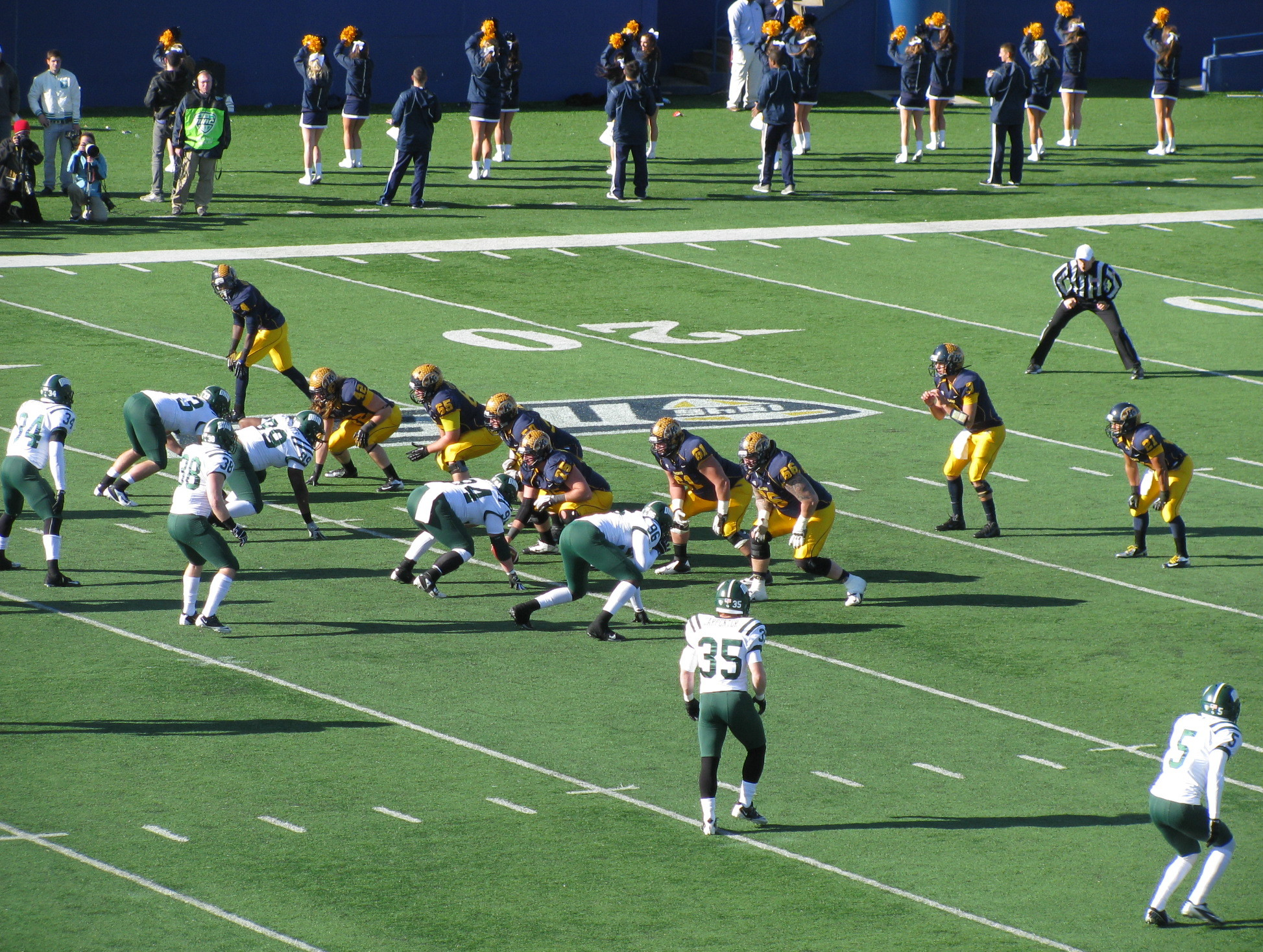
Kent State vs. Ohio at Dix Stadium in 2012. The Flashes won the game 28–6 to clinch an 8–0 season in MAC play

Kent State clinched their first-ever MAC East Division title and spot in the 2012 MAC Championship Game with a 31–24 win over Bowling Green at Doyt Perry Stadium on November 17. Following the win over Bowling Green, the Flashes rose to No. 23 in the AP poll and entered the Coaches' and Harris polls at No. 25. Kent State was also ranked for the first time in the Bowl Championship Series standings at No. 23. The team climbed as high as 17th in the BCS standings following their regular season-ending win over Ohio at Dix Stadium on November 23, which clinched their first-ever undefeated season in MAC play and set a record for most wins in a season with 11. They were also mentioned as a potential BCS Buster. Kent State, however, fell in overtime to Northern Illinois in the MAC Championship Game. Following the loss to NIU, Kent State accepted the invitation to play in the 2013 GoDaddy.com Bowl. Kent State fell to Arkansas State in the game by a score of 17–13 to finish 11–3 overall.

Darrell Hazell accepted the head coaching position at Purdue on December 5, but Purdue granted Hazell permission to coach Kent State in the bowl game, the first bowl appearance by the Flashes since the 1972 Tangerine Bowl.

=== 2013–present ===
Paul Haynes, a Kent State alum who had previously served as defensive coordinator at Arkansas, was hired as Kent State's head football coach on December 18, 2012. Haynes was the second African American head coach in the history of Kent State football.

In Haynes' first season, the Golden Flashes finished with a 4–8 record. Kent State followed that season with a 2–9 mark in 2014 and consecutive 3–9 seasons in 2015 and 2016. Haynes was fired after the 2017 season, finishing his tenure with a record of 14–45 overall, 9–30 in conference play.

Sean Lewis was hired as head coach in 2018 and served for five seasons, compiling an overall record of 24–31 and 19–17 in MAC play. He led Kent State to bowl game appearances in 2019 and 2021, including the program's first-ever bowl win, a 51–41 victory over Utah State in the Tropical Smoothie Cafe Frisco Bowl. In 2021 he also led the team to only their second appearance in the MAC Championship game. Lewis left the program in December 2022 when he was hired as offensive coordinator for the Colorado Buffaloes Football Team under head coach Deion Sanders.

Kenni Burns was hired as head coach in 2023. In his first season, he led the team to a 1-11 record, the worst in FBS college football. Kenni Burns went 0-12 with Kent State in 2024.

== Conference affiliations ==
- Independent (1920–1931)
- Ohio Athletic Conference (1932–1950)
- Mid-American Conference (1951–present)

== Championships ==
=== Conference championships ===
Kent State has won one conference championship in school history.

Year	Conference	Coach	Record	Conference Record
1972	Mid-American Conference	Don James	6–5–1	4–1

=== Division championships ===
In the division era (1997–2023) of the MAC, Kent State won two division titles.

Season	Division	Coach	Opponent	CG result
2012	MAC East	Darrell Hazell	Northern Illinois	L 37–44^{2OT}
2021	MAC East	Sean Lewis	Northern Illinois	L 23–41

== Head coaches ==
Since 1920, Kent State has employed 24 head coaches for football. The team did not hold a football team from 1943 to 1945 due to World War II. Trevor J. Rees holds the most wins in program history with 92 wins, while Doug Martin holds the mark for most wins since 1970 with 29. Just six coaches have left Kent State with a winning record while just four had a winning record in conference play.

Coach	Tenure	Record	Pct.	Conf. record	Pct.
Paul G. Chandler	1920–1922	1–11–1	.115	–	–
Frank Harsh	1923–1924	0–9	.000	–	–
Merle E. Wagoner	1925–1932	15–33–9	.342	0–5–2	.143
Joe Begala	1933–1934	4–5–6	.467	4–5–6	.467
Donald Starn	1935–1942	34–28–3	.546	21–20–2	.512
Trevor J. Rees	1946–1963	92–63–5	.591	47–36–1 (Note: In the Ohio Athletic Conference (1946–1950), Rees went 11–3. In the MAC, Rees went 36–33–1.)	.565
Leo Strang	1964–1967	16–21–2	.436	7–15–2	.333
Dave Puddington	1968–1970	9–21	.300	3–14	.176
Don James	1971–1974	25–19–1	.567	10–10	.500
Dennis Fitzgerald	1975–1977	18–16	.529	12–12	.500
Ron Blackledge	1978–1980	8–25	.242	6–20	.231
Ed Chlebek	1981–1982	4–18	.182	3–15	.167
Dick Scesniak	1983–1985	8–25	.242	6–20	.231
Glen Mason	1986–1987	12–10	.545	10–6	.625
Dick Crum	1988–1990	7–26	.212	5–19	.208
Pete Cordelli	1991–1993	3–30	.091	3–23	.115
Jim Corrigall	1994–1997	8–35–1	.193	6–26–1	.197
Dean Pees	1998–2003	17–51	.250	13–35	.271
Doug Martin	2004–2010	29–53	.354	21–35	.375
Darrell Hazell	2011–2012	16–10	.615	12–4	.750
Paul Haynes	2013–2017	14–45	.237	9–30	.231
Sean Lewis	2018–2022	24–31	.436	19–17	.528
Kenni Burns	2023–2024	1–23	.042	0–16	.000
Mark Carney	2025-present	5-7	.417	4-4	.500

== Bowl games ==
Kent State has appeared in five bowl games, going 1–4. They won their first bowl game in school history by defeating Utah State in the 2019 Frisco Bowl.

Season	Coach	Bowl	Opponent	Result
1954	Trevor J. Rees	Refrigerator Bowl	Delaware	L 7–19
1972	Don James	Tangerine Bowl	Tampa	L 18–21
2012	Darrell Hazell	GoDaddy.com Bowl	Arkansas State	L 13–17
2019	Sean Lewis	Frisco Bowl	Utah State	W 51–41
2021	Sean Lewis	Famous Idaho Potato Bowl	Wyoming	L 38–52

== Rivalries ==
=== Akron ===
Kent State's biggest rival is Akron, located 10 miles (16 km) from the Kent campus. The two schools first met in 1923 and have played 56 times through the 2013 meeting. Akron went 11–0–1 in the first 12 meetings in the series between 1923 and 1941, with no games played from 1924–27 and 1937–39. Kent State started a 10-game winning streak in 1942 through 1954, though no games were played during the World War II years of 1943–45 when neither school fielded teams. After the 1954 meeting, the rivalry was scrapped due to a lack of competition. It was reinstated in 1972 and has been an annual contest since 1983. In 1992, Akron joined the MAC and the rivalry became a conference game.

Since 1946, the two teams have played for the Wagon Wheel. The story goes that John R. Buchtel was searching for a site to start a new college in 1870 near what is now Kent State University when his wagon became stuck in the mud. The horses pulled the wagon apart and one of the wheels ended up being buried. Buchtel would eventually settle on a site in Akron for Buchtel College. In 1902, while digging for a pipeline in Kent, the wheel was discovered and eventually came into the possession of Kent State dean of men Dr. Raymond Manchester. It was he who suggested in 1945 that the wheel be used as a trophy for the winner of the Kent State-Akron football game.

Akron leads the series 35–24–2 through the 2018 season

=== Bowling Green ===
Bowling Green leads the series 60–22–6 through the 2020 season.

== Facilities ==
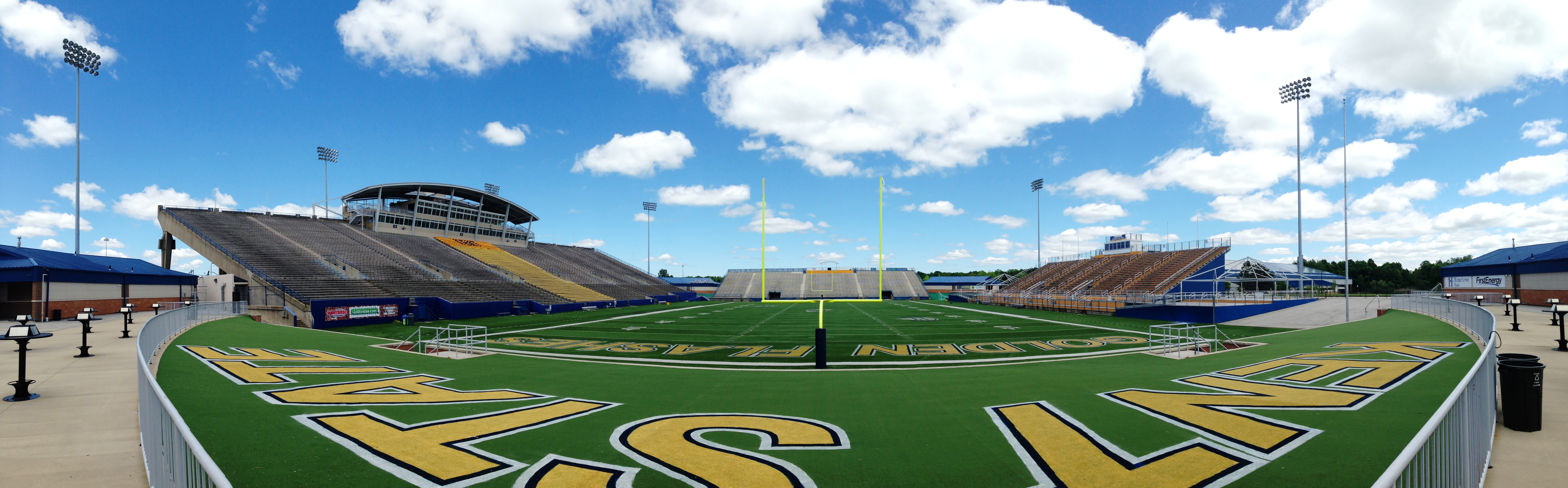
Dix Stadium from the south end zone, 2014

The Flashes' home field is Dix Stadium, located along Summit Street on the eastern edge of the KSU campus just east of Ohio State Route 261. The stadium opened in 1969 and has a seating capacity of 25,318. Dix Stadium features a FieldTurf playing surface, which was installed in 2005. It was originally a natural grass field until 1997, when an Astroturf surface was installed. From 1997 to 2004, the stadium also hosted the Kent State field hockey team until a new facility for field hockey was built immediately north of the stadium in 2005.

Dix Stadium was most recently renovated in two phases in 2007 and 2008. Phase one included construction of a large canopy over the press box, new entrance gates, and a ticket office, all completed prior to the 2007 season opener. Phase two included the demolition of the south end zone seats and construction of a new high definition scoreboard, concession area, and plaza in the sound end zone area.

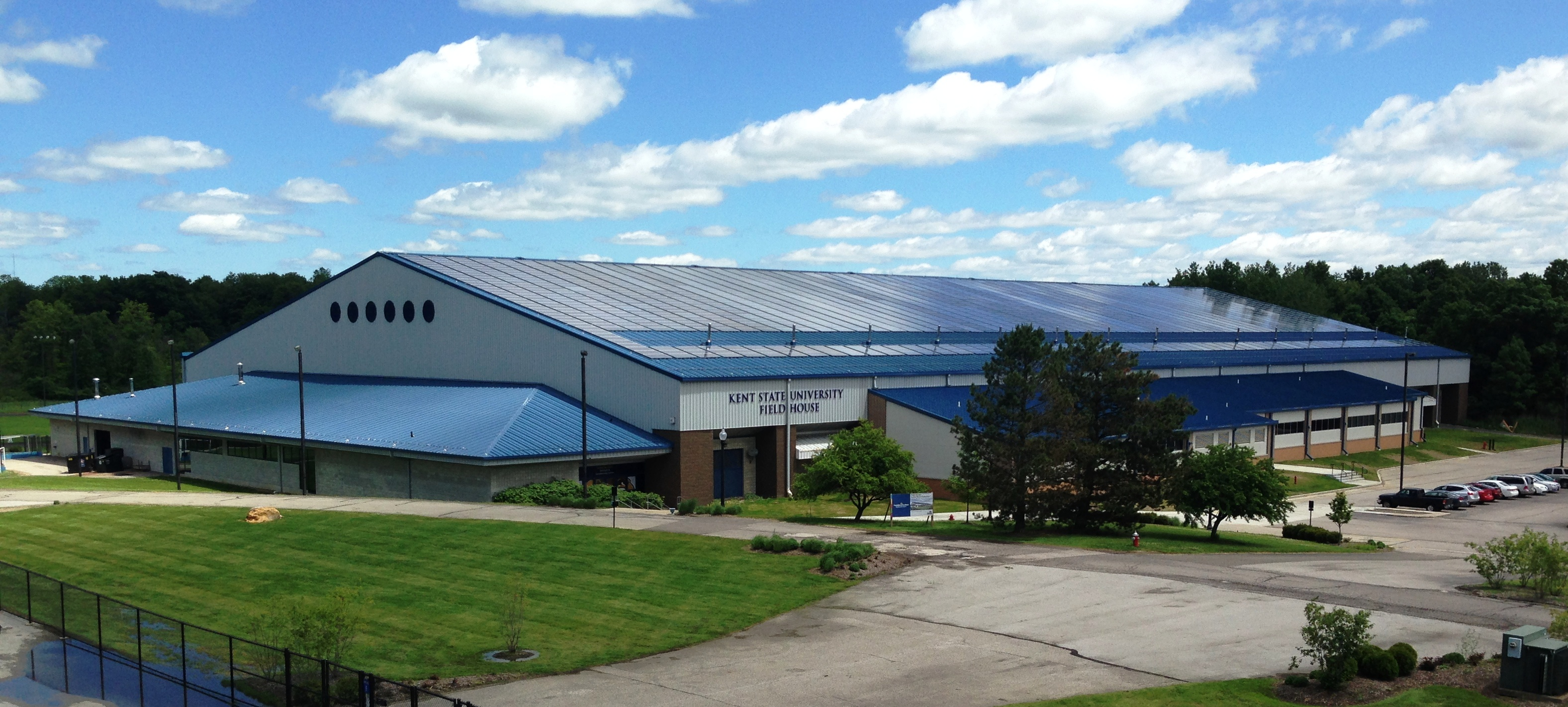
Kent State Field House in 2014

Adjacent to the stadium to the north are two natural grass practice fields. Immediately east of the stadium is the Kent State Field House, which opened in 1990. The Field House includes a full-size football field, a six-lane indoor track, and a weight training room named for Kent State football alumnus James Harrison. The building, one of the first indoor football facilities built in Ohio, is also used by several other Kent State athletic teams during the year and is the home indoor venue for the men's and women's track teams. It includes locker rooms for women's soccer, field hockey, softball, and men's and women's track.

Dix Stadium is the third facility the Flashes have called home. From the team's inception in 1920 through the 1940 season, they played at Rockwell Field, which was located adjacent to the original campus buildings on what is now known as The Commons. Rockwell Field was shared with the track and baseball teams and was plagued with drainage and quality issues its entire existence as an athletic field. For seating, it initially had no seating before primitive wooden bleachers were added in the 1930s. At its peak, the bleachers held approximately 3,000 people, with crowds reported for some games as large as 5,000. In 1941, the team moved to the new Athletic Field along Summit Street, a Works Progress Administration project that included separate football and baseball fields, with the football field surrounded by a cinder track. Seating was again provided on primitive wooden bleachers. After the football team was restored in 1946 following the return of men from World War II, a drive started in the late 1940s to build a permanent grandstand around the existing field. Memorial Stadium opened in 1950 with seating for 7,000 fans, a new electronic scoreboard, permanent press box, and field lighting. It was expanded multiple times and by 1966 seated approximately 20,000 people. Most of Memorial Stadium was used in the construction of Dix Stadium as the Memorial Stadium seating areas were dismantled in 1969 and transported to the current site in a new configuration.

== Notable players ==
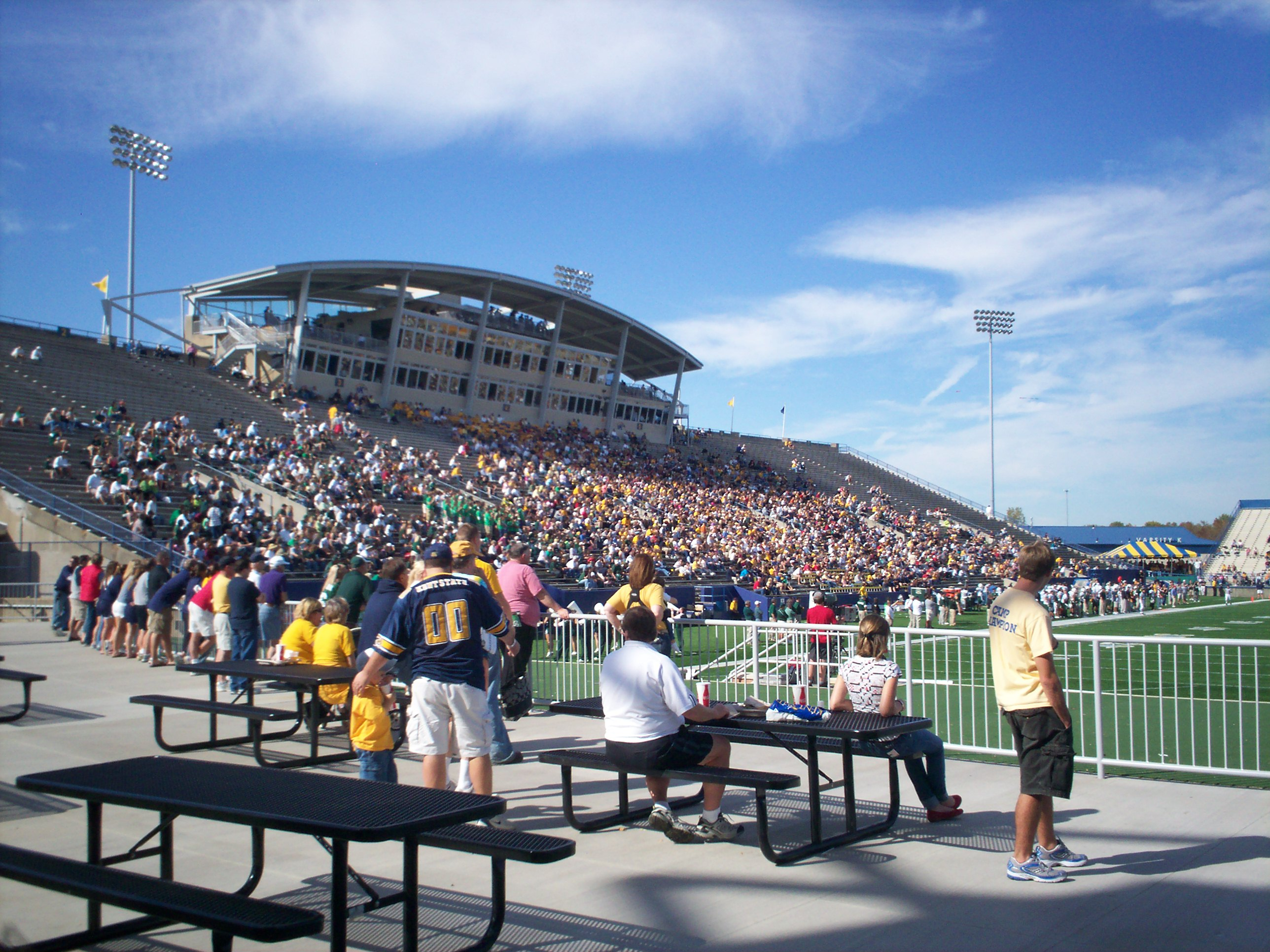
West stands in a 2008 game at Dix Stadium against the Ohio Bobcats.

Despite the overall lack of success in the program, Kent State has produced a number of standouts including several prominent figures in college football, the Canadian Football League and in the National Football League.

=== College football ===
- Lou Holtz, former head coach of the Arkansas Razorbacks, Notre Dame Fighting Irish, North Carolina State Wolfpack, and South Carolina Gamecocks
- Gary Pinkel, former head coach of the Missouri Tigers and Toledo Rockets
- Nick Saban, retired former head coach of the Alabama Crimson Tide; former head coach of the LSU Tigers, Michigan State Spartans and Toledo Rockets (college), and Miami Dolphins (NFL)

=== Canadian Football League ===
- Walter Bender, former CFL player
- Jim Corrigall, former Toronto Argonauts player and member of Canadian Football Hall of Fame
- Jim Goss, former Ottawa Rough Riders player
- Gerry Tuttle, former BC Lions player
- Jay McNeil, former Calgary Stampeders player

=== National Football League ===
40 Kent State alumni have either played in or are playing in the National Football League—although as noted below, not all of them played football at the school.

Former Golden Flashes football players

- Jack Lambert, former Pittsburgh Steelers player and member of Pro Football Hall of Fame
- James Harrison, Pittsburgh Steelers, Baltimore Ravens, New England Patriots, Cincinnati Bengals
- Julian Edelman, New England Patriots
- Art Best, Chicago Bears, New York Giants
- Joshua Cribbs, Cleveland Browns, Oakland Raiders, Indianapolis Colts
- Abram Elam, Dallas Cowboys
- Josh Kline, New England Patriots
- Daniel Muir, Indianapolis Colts
- Rico Murray, Cincinnati Bengals
- Jack Williams, Denver Broncos
- Usama Young, New Orleans Saints, Cleveland Browns, Oakland Raiders
- Jameson Konz, Seattle Seahawks, Dallas Cowboys, Denver Broncos
- Monte Simmons, Philadelphia Eagles
- Ishmaa'ily Kitchen. Cleveland Browns
- Brian Winters, New York Jets
- Dri Archer, Pittsburgh Steelers, New York Jets, Buffalo Bills
- Don Nottingham, former player for Miami Dolphins and Baltimore Colts
- O.J. Santiago, former tight end for the Atlanta Falcons, Cleveland Browns, Oakland Raiders and New England Patriots
- Abdul Salaam, defensive end for the New York Jets and member of the New York Sack Exchange
- Andy Harmon, Defensive tackle for the Philadelphia Eagles
- Pete Mikolajewski, former San Diego Chargers player
- Eric Wilkerson, Pittsburgh Steelers
- Van Jakes, Cornerback Kansas City Chiefs New Orleans SaintsGreen Bay Packers

Other Kent State products in the NFL

- Antonio Gates, Los Angeles Chargers — played basketball at KSU
- Jermail Porter, Kansas City Chiefs — an All-American wrestler at KSU

=== Conference Awards ===
==== MAC Player of the Year ====
- Eric Wilkerson, HB -1987
- Dustin Crum, QB -2021

==== MAC Offensive Player of the Year ====
- Eric Wilkerson, HB -1987

==== MAC Defensive Player of the Year ====
- Jack Lambert, LB -1972
- Roosevelt Nix, DL - 2010

==== MAC Special Teams Player of the Year ====
- Dri Archer, RB/RS -2012
- Matthew Trickett K - 2019
- Da'Realyst Clark, WR/RS - 2025

MAC Freshman of the Year

- Patrick Young QB - 1986
- Morrey Norris LB - 1991
- Astron Whatley RB - 1994
- Roosevelt Nix, DL - 2010

=== All-Americans ===
- Jim Corrigall, DE -1969 (AP-3, NEA-1) (Canadian Football Hall of Fame)
- Eric Wilkerson, HB -1987 (AP -HM)
- Eric Wilkerson, HB -1988 (AP -HM)
- Dri Archer, RB/ RS -2012 CONSENSUS (FWAA, TSN, WCFF, ESPN, Scout, AP-3)
- Jayden Studio, LB -2024 (CFN Freshman -HM)

=== College Football Hall of Fame ===
Two former Kent State players have been inducted into the College Football Hall of Fame. Lou Holtz attended Kent State, where he played lineback from 1956 to 1957. Holtz was inducted into the College Football Hall of Fame for his contributions as the head coach at Notre Dame. He had a career college head coaching record of 249–132–7. Holtz's 1988 Notre Dame team went 12–0 with a victory in the Fiesta Bowl and was the consensus national champion. Holtz is the only college football coach to lead six different programs to bowl games and the only coach to guide four different programs to the final top 15 rankings.

Gary Pinkel attended Kent State, where he played tight end from 1970 to 1973, and was a graduate assistant from 1974 to 1975. Pinkel was inducted into the College Football Hall of Fame for his contributions as the head coach at Toledo and Missouri. He served as the head football coach at the University of Toledo from 1991 to 2000 and the University of Missouri from 2001 to 2015, compiling career record of 191–110–3. Pinkel has the most wins of any head coach in the history of the Toledo Rockets football program and also holds the record for most wins by a head coach of the Missouri Tigers football program.

One former Kent State coach is also enshrined in the College Football Hall of Fame, mostly for their contributions while coaching at other schools. Don James served as the head coach at Kent State University from 1971 to 1974 and at the University of Washington from 1975 to 1992, compiling a career college football record of 178–76–3 (.698).

His 1991 Washington team won a share of the national championship after completing a 12–0 season with a decisive win over Michigan in the Rose Bowl. James was inducted into the College Football Hall of Fame as a coach in 1997.

Name	Years	Position	Inducted	Ref
Gary Pinkel	1970-1973, 1974-1975	TE / grad assistant coach / head coach	2022	
Don James	1971–1974	Head coach	1997	
Lou Holtz	1956-1957	LB / head coach	2008	

=== Canadian Football Hall of Fame ===
One former Kent State player has been inducted into the Canadian Football Hall of Fame. Jim Corrigall attended Kent State, where he played defensive end from 1967 to 1969. He went on to win the Canadian Football League's FL's Most Outstanding Defensive Player Award in 1975 with the Toronto Argonauts and was an 8-time CFL All-Star (1971-1973, 1975, 1977-1980).

Name	Years	Position	Inducted	Ref
Jim Corrigall	1967–1969	DE	1990	

=== Pro Football Hall of Fame ===
One former Kent State player has been inducted into the Pro Football Hall of Fame. Jack Lambert attended Kent State, where he played linebacker from 1971 to 1973. He went on to win 4 Super Bowls with the Pittsburgh Steelers. In addition, Antonio Gates played basketball for Kent State but was inducted into the Pro Football Hall of Fame in 2025 becoming the 2nd Pro Football Hall of Famer from Kent State.

Name	Years	Position	Inducted	Ref
Jack Lambert	1971–1973	LB	1990	
Antonio Gates (basketball)	2001–2003	PF	2025	

== Retired numbers ==
Kent State Golden Flashes retired numbers

Josh Cribbs; QB, 2001–2004

Eric Wilkerson; RB, 1985–1988

Jim Corrigall; DE, 1967–1969

Jack Lambert; LB, 1971–1973

== Future non-conference opponents ==
Announced schedules as of November 11, 2026.

2027	2028	2029	2030
at Notre Dame	at Kentucky		at Rutgers
Mercyhurst	at Rutgers		at Kentucky
