= Darrell Hazell =

American football player and coach (born 1964)

Biographical details
- Born: April 14, 1964 (age 62); Cinnaminson Township, New Jersey, U.S.

Playing career
- 1982–1985: Muskingum
- Position: Wide receiver

Coaching career (HC unless noted)
- 1986–1987: Oberlin (RB)
- 1988: Eastern Illinois (RB/WR)
- 1989–1991: Oberlin (OC)
- 1992–1994: Penn (RB)
- 1995–1996: Western Michigan (WR)
- 1997–1998: Army (WR/TE)
- 1999–2000: West Virginia (RB)
- 2001–2002: Rutgers (WR)
- 2003: Rutgers (asst. HC/WR)
- 2004: Ohio State (WR)
- 2005–2010: Ohio State (asst. HC/WR)
- 2011–2012: Kent State
- 2013–2016: Purdue
- 2017–2018: Minnesota Vikings (WR)

Head coaching record
- Overall: 25–43
- Bowls: 0–1

Accomplishments and honors

Championships
- 1 MAC East Division (2012)

Darrell Ivan Hazell (born April 14, 1964) is an American former football coach. Hazell has been a head coach twice, with Kent State from 2011 to 2012, and Purdue from 2013 to 2016.

A native of Cinnaminson Township, New Jersey, Hazell graduated in 1982 from Cinnaminson High School where he played football and ran track and then attended Muskingum University starting in the fall of 1982. He played on the football team as a starter for his final three years at the school. Hazell graduated in 1986.

He held assistant coaching positions at Oberlin, Eastern Illinois, Penn, Western Michigan, Army, West Virginia, and Rutgers. Hazell then served as the wide receivers coach at Ohio State under Jim Tressel from 2004 to 2010. In December 2010, Kent State hired him as its head coach. On November 28, 2012, Hazell was named 2012 Mid-American Conference Coach of the Year by the conference's coaches.

On December 5, 2012, Purdue named Hazell their new head coach, replacing Danny Hope. Hazell held the lowest win percentage for a multiple-season coach in the program's history at the time of his severance from the program.

== Early life ==
Hazell attended Cinnaminson High School in Cinnaminson Township, New Jersey. A 1982 graduate, Hazell was a member of both the football and track & field teams.

== College career ==
At age 17, Hazell was unsure of his college intentions when he attended a college fair in Philadelphia, Pennsylvania. Hazell was approached by a man who insisted he consider a small school in Ohio, so Hazell found the closest booth of a small Ohio college and filled out an information card. Three weeks later, Hazell received a phone call from Muskingum University head coach, Jeff Heacock, asking Hazell to come on a recruiting visit. Hazell agreed to take a visit, also scheduling a visit with Waynesburg College the same weekend. In four hours, Hazell fell in love with, and ultimately chose Muskingum. When Hazell enrolled at Muskingum in the fall of 1982, he lettered as a wide receiver. Hazell had a breakout sophomore season in 1983, hauling in season records of 805 receiving yards and 12 touchdowns. His stellar performance earned him his first All-Ohio Athletic Conference (OAC) honor. Hazell would go on to earn a letter each season for the Muskies as a member of the football team. As a junior in 1984, Hazell earned All-OAC honors again helping the team tie a school record 9 wins in a single season. As a senior during the 1985 season Hazell served as a team captain, on his way to earning All-OAC honors as well as Division III Honorable Mention All-American honors by Pizza Hut. Hazell also participated as a sprinter on the track team, where he was a multi-year letter winner. Hazell's 132 receptions and 1,966 receiving yards stood as Muskies career records until James Washington broke both records in 2013.

Hazell was inducted into the Muskingum University Athletic Hall of Fame in 1993.

== Coaching career ==
=== Early coaching career ===
Hazell began his coaching career as the running backs coach under head coach Don Hunsinger, at Oberlin College in Oberlin, Ohio. Hazell spent two seasons at Oberlin before accepting the position of running backs and wide receivers coach at Eastern Illinois University in 1988. While at Eastern Illinois, Hazell worked under former Purdue starting quarterback Bob Spoo, who was in his second year with the program. The following year however, Hazell returned to Oberlin where he was given the opportunity to become the offensive coordinator. After leaving Oberlin for a three-year stint at Penn, Hazell returned to the D-I ranks where he spent two years as WR coach at Western Michigan University under Hall of Fame Coach Al Molde. In 2001, Hazell accepted the wide receivers coach position at Rutgers University under new head coach, Greg Schiano.

=== Ohio State ===
In 2004, Hazell accepted the wide receivers coach position at Ohio State University. Under head coach Jim Tressel, Hazell earned Tressel's trust and was promoted to Assistant Head Coach in addition to his wide receiver duties in 2005. Hazell would remain with Ohio State until 2010.

=== Kent State ===
==== 2011 ====
In December 2010, Hazell was named the head coach at Kent State University. In Hazell's first season, the team had two three-game losing streaks, but also had a five-game winning streak in the latter half of the season. Kent State dropped their first three contests, which included losses at eventual BCS national champion Alabama and Kansas State and a home loss to Louisiana-Lafayette. Hazell's first win at Kent State came on September 24, in a 33–25 win over South Alabama at Dix Stadium. The team then dropped their first three MAC games before defeating Bowling Green, which was the start of a five-game winning streak that included a 35–3 win over arch-rival Akron at InfoCision Stadium – Summa Field, Kent State's first win in Akron since 2003. The season ended with a 34–16 loss at Temple. The Flashes finished third in the MAC East with a 5–7 record overall and 4–4 in the MAC.

==== 2012 ====
The 2012 season began with a 41–21 win over Towson at Dix Stadium, followed by a 47–17 loss at Kentucky. Following the loss, the Flashes defeated Buffalo at University at Buffalo Stadium and followed that with a come-from-behind 45–43 win over Ball State in Kent. A 31–17 win over Army at Michie Stadium was the first victory for Kent State over a non-conference team on the road since 2007. The winning streak reached six, the longest for Kent State since 1940, after a 35–23 win over undefeated and 18th-ranked Rutgers at High Point Solutions Stadium. The win was the Flashes' first over a ranked opponent after entering the game 0–22 against ranked teams. The win earned Kent State votes in the October 28, 2012 AP Poll, Coaches' Poll, and the Harris Interactive College Football Poll. The team continued winning, beating Akron in the Battle for the Wagon Wheel game at Dix Stadium, followed by a 48–32 win over the Miami RedHawks at Yager Stadium. The win over Miami set a new team record for consecutive victories in a season at eight and tied the 1973 team for most wins in a season at nine. On November 11, the Flashes were ranked 25th in the weekly AP poll, their first time being ranked since November 5, 1973, when they were ranked 19th for one week.

Kent State clinched their first-ever MAC East Division title and spot in the 2012 MAC Championship Game with a 31–24 win over Bowling Green at Doyt Perry Stadium on November 17. Following the win over Bowling Green, the Flashes rose to No. 23 in the AP poll and entered the Coaches' and Harris polls at No. 25. Kent State was also ranked for the first time in the Bowl Championship Series (BCS) standings at No. 23. The team climbed as high as 17th in the BCS standings following their regular season-ending win over Ohio at Dix Stadium on November 23, which clinched their first-ever undefeated season in MAC play and set a record for most wins in a season with 11. They were also mentioned as a potential BCS Buster. Kent State, however, fell in overtime to Northern Illinois in the MAC Championship Game. Following the loss to NIU, Kent State accepted the invitation to play in the 2013 GoDaddy.com Bowl. Hazell accepted the head coaching position at Purdue on December 5, but Purdue granted Hazell permission to coach Kent State in the bowl game, the first bowl appearance by the Flashes since the 1972 Tangerine Bowl. Paul Haynes, a Kent State alum who had previously been an assistant at Arkansas, was hired December 18. Kent State fell to Arkansas State 17–13 to finish 11–3 overall.

=== Purdue ===
==== 2013 ====
On December 5, 2012, Hazell was announced as the 35th head coach in Purdue University's history. Hazell's contract with Purdue was for 6 years and $12 million. In Hazell's first career game at Purdue, the Boilermakers lost 7–42 to the Cincinnati Bearcats. The following week against Indiana State, Hazell won his first game at Purdue 20–14. After the Boilermakers started 1–3, and Rob Henry continuing to struggle in the team's 4th game, Danny Etling was thrust into a game with Purdue trailing 27–10 to Northern Illinois. Etling finished the game with 241 yards passing while throwing two touchdowns and two interceptions. During the ensuing week, Etling was named the starter for the Boilermakers. With Etling at quarterback, Hazell showed he was playing the 2013 season to gain experience for younger players. The Boilermakers finished the 2013 season with a 56–36 loss to the Indiana Hoosiers. Their 1–11 record was one of the worst seasons in Purdue history.

==== 2014 ====
After yet another preseason quarterback competition, Etling beat out Austin Appleby for Purdue's starting quarterback job. Purdue opened the 2014 season with a 43–34 victory over Western Michigan. Etling would lead Purdue to a 2–3 record of the first five games of the season, before Hazell turned to Appleby to start Purdue's 6th game against Illinois. Appleby led Purdue to a 38–27 victory, Hazell's first Big Ten Conference victory. After starting the season 3–3, Purdue lost a close game to Minnesota at the TCF Bank Stadium to start a season-ending 6-game losing streak (ending with 23–16 loss to Indiana Hoosiers), finishing the year 3–9.

==== 2015 ====
During the offseason, quarterback Danny Etling transferred to LSU. Austin Appleby beat out David Blough and Elijah Sindelar to win the starting quarterback job. The season started with a narrow loss against Marshall, but the team bounced back with an easy win over their FCS opponent, Indiana State. After throwing six interceptions through three games, Appleby was replaced as starting quarterback by David Blough, making it four starting quarterbacks in the four seasons since 2011. Despite occasional flashes of competitive play (like a 24–21 loss to No. 2 Michigan State), Purdue continued to lose, finishing the season with a 54–36 home loss to Indiana Hoosiers, bring the team's record to 2–10.

==== 2016 ====
The season opened with a 45–24 win over Eastern Kentucky, but was followed by a 38–20 loss to Cincinnati. After a bye week the Boilermakers escaped with a 24–14 win over Nevada and were then defeated in a blow-out loss by Maryland 50–7 in their first Big Ten contest of the year. On October 16, 2016, after a loss to Iowa, Purdue University fired Hazell with a 3–3 record on the season. Hazell was 9–33 (3–24 in the Big Ten) during his three-and-a-half-year tenure.

=== Minnesota Vikings ===
On February 17, 2017, Hazell was hired as the wide receivers coach for the Minnesota Vikings.

=== Retirement ===
After the 2018 season, Hazell retired from coaching.

== Head coaching record ==
Year	Team	Overall	Conference	Standing	Bowl/playoffs
Kent State Golden Flashes (Mid-American Conference) (2011–2012)
2011	Kent State	5–7	4–4	3rd (East)	
2012	Kent State	11–3	8–0	1st (East)	L GoDaddy.com
Kent State:		16–10	12–4		
Purdue Boilermakers (Big Ten Conference) (2013–2016)
2013	Purdue	1–11	0–8	6th (Leaders)	
2014	Purdue	3–9	1–7	7th (West)	
2015	Purdue	2–10	1–7	7th (West)	
2016	Purdue	3–3	1–2	(West)	
Purdue:		9–33	3–24		
Total:		25–43			
National championship Conference title Conference division title or championship game berth
