= Eric Wilkerson =

American football player (born 1966)

No. 40
- Position: Running back

Personal information
- Born: December 19, 1966 (age 59); Cleveland, Ohio, U.S.
- Listed height: 5 ft 9 in (1.75 m)
- Listed weight: 185 lb (84 kg)

Career information
- High school: Central Catholic (Cleveland)
- College: Kent State (1985–1988)
- NFL draft: 1989: undrafted

Career history
- Pittsburgh Steelers (1989); Detroit Lions (1990)*; New York/New Jersey Knights (1991–1992); Cleveland Thunderbolts (1993)
- * Offseason or practice squad member only

Awards and highlights
- MAC Most Valuable Player (1987); MAC Offensive Player of the Year (1987); Kent State Golden Flashes No. 40 retired

Career NFL statistics
- Games played: 1
- Stats at Pro Football Reference

Career AFL statistics
- Total tackles: 5
- Interceptions: 1
- Stats at ArenaFan.com

Eric LaShawn Wilkerson (born December 19, 1966) is an American former professional football player who was a running back for one season with the Pittsburgh Steelers of the National Football League (NFL). He played college football for the Kent State Golden Flashes. He was also a member of the Detroit Lions, the New York/New Jersey Knights and the Cleveland Thunderbolts.

== Early life ==
Wilkerson lettered in football and track all four years for the Cleveland Central Catholic High School Ironmen. He rushed for nearly 1,300 yards and 17 touchdowns his senior year. He also finished fourth in the state track meet in the 400 meters. Wilkerson earned All-Conference and All-Scholastic honors. He has been inducted into the school's hall of fame.

== College career ==
Wilkerson played for the Kent State Golden Flashes from 1985 to 1988, recording career totals of 3,830 yards and 36 touchdowns on 739 rushing attempts. He also accumulated two kick return touchdowns, two passing touchdowns and 506 receiving yards on 44 receptions. He was named the MAC Player of the Year and Offensive Player of the Year in 1987 after rushing for 1,221 yards and ten touchdowns. Wilkerson led the MAC in rushing yards in 1988 with 1,325 and in rushing touchdowns with 14. He earned First-team All-MAC honors three times during his college career. He also earned AP Honorable Mention All-American honors in 1987 and 1988. Wilkerson was selected to play in the East-West Shrine Game following his senior season. He was inducted into the Varsity "K" Hall of Fame in 1995. His number 40 was retired by the Golden Flashes on March 1, 1989.

== Professional career ==
Pre-draft measurables
Height	Weight	Arm length	Hand span	40-yard dash	10-yard split	20-yard split	20-yard shuttle	Vertical jump	Broad jump	Bench press
5 ft 8 3/4 in (1.75 m)	181 lb (82 kg)	32 3/4 in (0.83 m)	9 1/2 in (0.24 m)	4.63 s	1.61 s	2.73 s	4.28 s	37.5 in (0.95 m)	10 ft 4 in (3.15 m)	9 reps
All values from NFL Combine

Wilkerson signed with the Pittsburgh Steelers on May 11, 1989. He later converted to wide receiver. He was released by the Steelers on September 4, 1989, and signed to the team's practice squad on September 6, 1989. Wilkerson played in one game for the Steelers during the 1989 season. He was also active for the team's two postseason games that year. He became a free agent after the 1989 season.

Wilkerson then signed with the Detroit Lions during the 1990 off-season. He was released by the Lions on September 3, 1990, and re-signed by the team later.

Wilkerson was selected by the New York/New Jersey Knights of the World League of American Football in the 1991 WLAF Draft. He led the league in rushing with 717 yards in 1991 and garnered Second-team All-World League accolades. He also tied for the league lead with eleven total touchdowns after recording seven rushing and four receiving scores. Wilkerson recorded 404 rushing yards, three rushing touchdowns and two receiving touchdowns in 1992.

Wilkerson played for the Cleveland Thunderbolts in 1993, recording five tackles, one pass breakup and one interception.
