= 2013 GoDaddy.com Bowl =

Kent State Golden Flashes	Arkansas State Red Wolves
(11–2)	(9–3)
MAC	Sun Belt
13	17
Head coach: Darrell Hazell	Head coach: John Thompson (interim)
AP / Coaches / BCS; 25 / NR / 25
	1	2	3	4	Total
Kent State	0	10	3	0	13
Arkansas State	0	14	3	0	17
- Date: January 6, 2013
- Season: 2012
- Stadium: Ladd–Peebles Stadium
- Location: Mobile, Alabama
- MVP: Special Teams: Ryan Wilbourn (ASU Punter); Offensive: J. D. McKissic (ASU Wide Receiver); Defensive: Qushaun Lee (ASU Linebacker); MVP: Ryan Aplin (ASU Quarterback)
- Favorite: Arkansas State by 4
- Referee: Alex Kemp (Big Ten)
- Attendance: 37,913
- Payout: US$1.5 million combined

United States TV coverage
- Network: ESPN
- Announcers: Mark Jones (play-by-play); Brock Huard (color-analyst); Jessica Mendoza (sideline reporter)

The 2013 GoDaddy.com Bowl was a postseason college football bowl game held on January 6, 2013, at Ladd–Peebles Stadium in Mobile, Alabama. The 14th edition of the bowl began at 8:00 p.m. CST and aired on ESPN. The Kent State Golden Flashes of the Mid-American Conference competed against the Sun Belt Conference champion Arkansas State Red Wolves.

== Teams ==
=== Arkansas State ===
Arkansas State won the Sun Belt championship, finishing the season with a 9–3 record and a 7–1 record in conference play. The team made its second consecutive appearance in the bowl and for the second consecutive year was playing without its head coach. Arkansas State had lost the prior appearance to Northern Illinois in the 2012 game.

=== Kent State ===
The GoDaddy.com Bowl was Kent State's first bowl game appearance in forty years; the team last played in the 1972 Tangerine Bowl. Kent State went 11–1 in regular season games and 8–0 in MAC play before losing the MAC Championship Game to Northern Illinois; their eleven victories set a team record. The team finished the season ranked #25 in the AP Poll. Kent State coach Darrell Hazell was MAC Coach of the Year and accepted the head coach position with the Purdue Boilermakers prior to the game.

== Game summary ==
=== Scoring summary ===
Scoring summary

Quarter	Time	Drive			Team	Scoring information	Score	
Quarter	Time	Plays	Yards	TOP	Team	Scoring information	Kent St	Arkansas St
2	12:10	4	66	2:14	Kent St	Dri Archer 16-yard touchdown run, Freddy Cortez kick good	7	0
2	5:40	9	60	3:18	Arkansas St	David Oku 10-yard touchdown run, Brian Davis kick good	7	7
2	1:13	9	88	2:12	Arkansas St	J. D. McKissic 31-yard touchdown reception from Ryan Aplin, Brian Davis kick good	7	14
2	0:19	7	34	0:54	Kent St	42-yard field goal by Freddy Cortez	10	14
3	8:35	10	47	4:18	Arkansas St	25-yard field goal by Brian Davis	10	17
3	1:44	13	50	6:51	Kent St	26-yard field goal by Freddy Cortez	13	17
"TOP" = time of possession. For other American football terms, see Glossary of American football.							13	17
