= John Thompson (American football coach) =

American football player and coach (born 1955)

Biographical details
- Born: October 16, 1955 (age 71); El Paso, Texas, U.S.

Playing career
- 1970s: Central Arkansas
- Position: Defensive back

Coaching career (HC unless noted)
- 1982: Arkansas (GA)
- 1983–1986: Northwestern State (DC)
- 1987: Alabama (LB)
- 1988–1989: Northwestern State (DC)
- 1990–1991: Louisiana Tech (DC)
- 1992: Southern Miss (DC)
- 1993–1998: Southern Miss (AHC/DC)
- 1999: Memphis (DC)
- 2000: Arkansas (co-DC)
- 2001: Arkansas (DC)
- 2002: Florida (DC/MLB)
- 2003–2004: East Carolina
- 2005: South Carolina (co-DC/ILB)
- 2007: Ole Miss (DC/DB)
- 2008–2011: Georgia State (AHC/DC/ILB)
- 2012–2013: Arkansas State (DC/LB)
- 2012: Arkansas State (interim HC)
- 2013: Arkansas State (interim HC)
- 2014–2015: Texas State (DC)
- 2017–2018: Blessed Trinity HS (GA) (DC/LB)

Administrative career (AD unless noted)
- 2006: Central Arkansas

Head coaching record
- Overall: 5–20
- Bowls: 2–0

John Thompson (born October 16, 1955) is an American former football coach. He served as the head football coach at East Carolina University from 2003 to 2004 and at Arkansas State University on an interim basis twice—first during the 2013 GoDaddy.com Bowl and then in the 2014 GoDaddy Bowl. He has compiled a career college football coaching record of 5–20.

== Coaching career ==
After playing defensive back at Central Arkansas, Thompson was defensive coordinator at Arkadelphia (AR) High School, working under John Outlaw and helping lead the Badgers to a state championship. He later became a graduate assistant under Lou Holtz at Arkansas, which led to him landing the defensive coordinator job at Northwestern State in Natchitoches, LA. One of the players he coached at Northwestern State was Ed Orgeron.

Thompson coached one year as outside linebackers coach for Alabama under Bill Curry, and became defensive coordinator at Louisiana Tech in 1990. He then landed the Southern Mississippi coordinator job where he stayed for most of the 1990s. Former Alabama offensive coordinator Rip Scherer hired Thompson at Memphis before Thompson coordinated for two years under Houston Nutt at Arkansas, and then a year under Ron Zook at Florida.

From 2003 to 2004, he was the head football coach at East Carolina. Thompson resigned after winning only 3 games in two years.

In 2005, Thompson was hired by Steve Spurrier as co-defensive coordinator at South Carolina, but then left in 2006 to return to his alma mater, the University of Central Arkansas, as the athletics director. Thompson then worked as defensive coordinator at Ole Miss under his former player Orgeron in 2007. The entire staff was fired after the 2007 season.

His latter defensive coordinator jobs on the college level included working for Curry again, this time helping start the football program at Georgia State, at Arkansas State under Gus Malzahn and then Bryan Harsin, and at Texas State under Dennis Franchione.

Keeping a home in Atlanta, Thompson entered the high school coaching ranks there after his college coaching career was over. He was the defensive coordinator for Blessed Trinity in Roswell in 2017–18, where he helped lead the Titans to two consecutive state championship victories. He moved into private business before coaching again at Fellowship Christian School, also in Roswell, as defensive coordinator in 2021–22. He was named head coach at Fellowship Christian in 2023.

== Head coaching record ==
Year	Team	Overall	Conference	Standing	Bowl/playoffs
East Carolina Pirates (Conference USA) (2003–2004)
2003	East Carolina	1–11	1–7	10th	
2004	East Carolina	2–9	2–6	T–10th	
East Carolina:		3–20	3–13		
Arkansas State Red Wolves (Sun Belt Conference) (2012–2013)
2012	Arkansas State	1–0*			W GoDaddy.com Bowl
2013	Arkansas State	1–0*			W GoDaddy Bowl
Arkansas State:		2–0		* Only coached bowl games	
Total:		5–20			
