= 2012 Arkansas State Red Wolves football team =

American college football season

2012 Arkansas State Red Wolves football

Sun Belt Conference champion GoDaddy.com Bowl champion

GoDaddy.com Bowl, W 17–13 vs. Kent State
- Conference: Sun Belt Conference
- Record: 10–3 (7–1 Sun Belt)
- Head coach: Gus Malzahn (1st season); John Thompson (interim; bowl game)
- Offensive coordinator: Rhett Lashlee (1st season)
- Offensive scheme: Spread
- Defensive coordinator: John Thompson (1st season)
- Base defense: Multiple
- Home stadium: Liberty Bank Stadium

2012 Sun Belt Conference football standings
	Conf.			Overall
Team	W		L	W		L
Arkansas State $	7	–	1	10	–	3
Louisiana–Monroe	6	–	2	8	–	5
Middle Tennessee	6	–	2	8	–	4
Louisiana–Lafayette *	4	–	2	5	–	4
Western Kentucky	4	–	4	7	–	6
Troy	3	–	5	5	–	7
North Texas	3	–	5	4	–	8
Florida Atlantic	2	–	6	3	–	9
FIU	2	–	6	3	–	9
South Alabama **	1	–	7	2	–	11
$ – Conference champion; * – Louisiana–Lafayette vacated 4 wins due to NCAA violations. ** – South Alabama was ineligible for the conference title or a bowl game as part of their transition to the FBS.

The 2012 Arkansas State Red Wolves football team represented Arkansas State University in the 2012 NCAA Division I FBS football season. They were led by first year head coach Gus Malzahn, who would leave for Auburn after a successful season. They played their home games at Liberty Bank Stadium as members of the Sun Belt Conference. Arkansas State recorded a Sun Belt conference championship on the way to a 10–3 season, culminating in a bowl win over Kent State in the 2013 GoDaddy.com Bowl.

Malzahn had taken over as head coach for Hugh Freeze, who left Arkansas State for Ole Miss at the end of the 2011 season. Malzahn, an Arkansas native, had been the offensive coordinator at Auburn in 2011, and his success at Arkansas State would lead him to return to Auburn the next year, this time as their head coach. He was hired prior to the Red Wolves' bowl game, so Defensive coordinator John Thompson led the team to victory in the bowl game.

Defensive back Don Jones was drafted in the 7th round of the 2013 NFL draft after the season.

== Schedule ==
Date	Time	Opponent	Site	TV	Result	Attendance
September 1	9:30 p.m.	at No. 5 Oregon*	Autzen Stadium; Eugene, OR	ESPN	L 34–57	56,144
September 8	6:00 p.m.	Memphis*	Liberty Bank Stadium; Jonesboro, AR (Paint Bucket Bowl)	ESPN3	W 33–28	28,041
September 15	11:00 a.m.	at No. 24 Nebraska*	Memorial Stadium; Lincoln, NE	ESPN2	L 13–42	85,290
September 22	6:00 p.m.	Alcorn State*	Liberty Bank Stadium; Jonesboro, AR	ESPN3	W 56–0	21,559
September 29	6:00 p.m.	Western Kentucky	Liberty Bank Stadium; Jonesboro, AR	ESPN3	L 13–26	25,160
October 4	6:30 p.m.	at FIU	FIU Stadium; Miami, FL	ESPNU	W 34–20	13,612
October 13	6:00 p.m.	South Alabama	Liberty Bank Stadium; Jonesboro, AR		W 36–29	22,143
October 23	7:00 p.m.	at Louisiana–Lafayette	Cajun Field; Lafayette, LA	ESPN2	W 50–27	19,873
November 3	4:00 p.m.	at North Texas	Apogee Stadium; Denton, TX		W 37–19	17,534
November 8	6:00 p.m.	Louisiana–Monroe	Liberty Bank Stadium; Jonesboro, AR	ESPNU	W 45–23	30,243
November 17	2:30 p.m.	at Troy	Veterans Memorial Stadium; Troy, AL	ESPN3, KAIT, KATV	W 41–34	20,614
December 1	2:00 p.m.	Middle Tennessee	Liberty Bank Stadium; Jonesboro, AR	ESPN3	W 45–0	31,243
January 6, 2013	8:00 p.m.	vs. No. 25 Kent State*	Ladd–Peebles Stadium; Mobile, AL (GoDaddy.com Bowl)	ESPN	W 17–13	37,913
*Non-conference game; Rankings from Coaches' Poll released prior to the game; All times are in Central time

== Game summaries ==
=== @ Oregon ===
	1	2	3	4	Total
Red Wolves	0	10	10	14	34
#5 Ducks	29	21	0	7	57

1st quarter scoring: ORE - Kenjon Barner 4-yard run (Dion Jordan pass from Jackson Rice); ORE - D. Thomas 12-yard pass from Marcus Mariota (Rob Beard kick); ORE - Josh Huff 4-yard pass from Mariota (Beard kick); ORE - Barner 17-yard run (Beard kick)

2nd quarter scoring: A-STATE - Brian Davis 43-yard field goal; ORE - Thomas 12-yard pass from Mariota (Beard kick); ORE - Thomas 33-yard run (Beard kick); ORE - Byron Marshall 3-yard run (Beard kick); A-STATE - Julian Jones 72-yard pass from Ryan Aplin (Davis, Brian kick)

3rd quarter scoring: A-STATE - Davis 29-yard field goal; A-STATE - Josh Jarboe 6-yard pass from Aplin (Davis kick)

4th quarter scoring: ORE - Rahsaan Vaughn 7-yard pass from Bryan Bennett (Beard kick); A-STATE - Carlos McCants 38-yard pass from Aplin (Davis kick); A-STATE - Aplin 1-yard run (Davis kick)

=== Memphis ===
	1	2	3	4	Total
Tigers	7	14	7	0	28
Red Wolves	3	14	10	6	33

=== @ Nebraska ===
	1	2	3	4	Total
Red Wolves	0	3	10	0	13
#24 Cornhuskers	14	14	0	14	42

=== Alcorn State ===
	1	2	3	4	Total
Braves	0	0	0	0	0
Red Wolves	14	28	7	7	56

=== WKU ===
	1	2	3	4	Total
Hilltoppers	0	0	14	12	26
Red Wolves	3	10	0	0	13

=== @ FIU ===
	1	2	3	4	Total
Red Wolves	0	14	13	7	34
Panthers	3	7	3	7	20

=== South Alabama ===
	1	2	3	4	Total
Jaguars	10	3	6	10	29
Red Wolves	14	0	14	8	36

=== @ Louisiana–Lafayette ===
	1	2	3	4	Total
Red Wolves	6	20	14	10	50
Ragin' Cajuns	0	7	7	13	27

=== @ North Texas ===
	1	2	3	4	Total
Red Wolves	10	20	7	0	37
Mean Green	9	3	7	0	19

=== Louisiana–Monroe ===
	1	2	3	4	Total
Warhawks	7	3	7	6	23
Red Wolves	14	3	21	7	45

=== @ Troy ===
	1	2	3	4	Total
Red Wolves	13	7	14	7	41
Trojans	7	10	6	11	34

=== Middle Tennessee ===
	1	2	3	4	Total
Blue Raiders	0	0	0	0	0
Red Wolves	21	14	7	3	45

=== Kent State–GoDaddy.com Bowl ===
	1	2	3	4	Total
Golden Flashes	0	10	3	0	13
Red Wolves	0	14	3	0	17
