= 2012 Kent State Golden Flashes football team =

American college football season

2012 Kent State Golden Flashes football

MAC East Division champion

MAC Championship Game, L 37–44 ^{2OT} vs. Northern Illinois

GoDaddy.com Bowl, L 13–17 vs. Arkansas State
- Conference: Mid-American Conference
- East Division
- Record: 11–3 (8–0 MAC)
- Head coach: Darrell Hazell (2nd season)
- Offensive coordinator: Brian Rock (2nd season)
- Offensive scheme: Spread
- Defensive coordinator: Jon Heacock (2nd season)
- Base defense: 4–3
- Home stadium: Dix Stadium

2012 Mid-American Conference football standings
	Conf.			Overall
Team	W		L	W		L
East Division
Kent State x	8	–	0	11	–	3
Bowling Green	6	–	2	8	–	5
Ohio	4	–	4	9	–	4
Buffalo	3	–	5	4	–	8
Miami (OH)	3	–	5	4	–	8
UMass	1	–	7	1	–	11
Akron	0	–	8	1	–	11
West Division
No. 22 Northern Illinois x$	8	–	0	12	–	2
Toledo	6	–	2	9	–	4
Ball State	6	–	2	9	–	4
Central Michigan	4	–	4	7	–	6
Western Michigan	2	–	6	4	–	8
Eastern Michigan	1	–	7	2	–	10
Championship: Northern Illinois 44, Kent State 37
$ – Conference champion and BCS representative as top non-AQ school to meet automatic qualification criteria; x – Division champion/co-champions; UMass not eligible for conference title or bowl game as part of FBS transition; Rankings from AP Poll

The 2012 Kent State Golden Flashes football team represented Kent State University in the 2012 NCAA Division I FBS football season. They were led by second-year head coach Darrell Hazell and played their home games at Dix Stadium as a member of the East Division of the Mid-American Conference.

The Flashes had their most successful season since their MAC championship season of 1972, winning the MAC East outright with an 8–0 record, and made it to the MAC Championship game where they lost, 44–37, to Northern Illinois in double-overtime. The team peaked at #18 in the BCS polls, finishing the regular season at #25. Kent State earned their first bowl bid since 1972, and played in the GoDaddy.com Bowl against Arkansas State. The Golden Flashes were defeated by the Red Wolves, 17–13.

== Schedule ==
Date	Time	Opponent	Rank	Site	TV	Result	Attendance
August 30	7:00 pm	No. 7 (FCS) Towson*		Dix Stadium; Kent, OH	ESPN3	W 41–21	15,121
September 8	7:30 pm	at Kentucky*		Commonwealth Stadium; Lexington, KY	CSS/ESPN3	L 14–47	48,346
September 19	7:00 pm	at Buffalo		University at Buffalo Stadium; Amherst, NY	ESPNU	W 23–7	14,373
September 29	12:00 pm	Ball State		Dix Stadium; Kent, OH	CSS/ESPN+	W 45–43	21,657
October 6	1:00 pm	at Eastern Michigan		Rynearson Stadium; Ypsilanti, MI		W 41–14	6,011
October 13	12:00 pm	at Army*		Michie Stadium; West Point, NY	CBSSN	W 31–17	30,022
October 20	3:30 pm	Western Michigan		Dix Stadium; Kent, OH		W 41–24	16,128
October 27	3:30 pm	at No. 18 Rutgers*		High Point Solutions Stadium; Piscataway, NJ	SNY	W 35–23	49,345
November 3	2:00 pm	Akron		Dix Stadium; Kent, OH (Battle for the Wagon Wheel)	STO	W 35–24	18,265
November 10	1:00 pm	at Miami (OH)		Yager Stadium; Oxford, OH		W 48–32	13,301
November 17	12:00 pm	at Bowling Green	No. 25	Doyt Perry Stadium; Bowling Green, OH (Battle for the Anniversary Award)	ESPN+	W 31–24	16,002
November 23	11:00 am	Ohio	No. 23	Dix Stadium; Kent, OH	ESPNU	W 28–6	18,230
November 30	7:00 pm	vs. No. 19 Northern Illinois	No. 18	Ford Field; Detroit, MI (MAC Championship Game)	ESPN2	L 37–44 ^{2OT}	18,132
January 6	9:00 pm	vs. Arkansas State*	No. 25	Ladd–Peebles Stadium; Mobile, AL (GoDaddy.com Bowl)	ESPN	L 13–17	37,913
*Non-conference game; Rankings from AP Poll released prior to the game; All times are in Eastern time

- Source: Schedule

== Rankings ==
Ranking movements Legend: ██ Increase in ranking ██ Decrease in ranking — = Not ranked RV = Received votes
	Week															
Poll	Pre	1	2	3	4	5	6	7	8	9	10	11	12	13	14	Final
AP	—	—	—	—	—	—	—	—	—	RV	RV	25	23	18	25	—
Coaches	—	—	—	—	—	—	—	—	—	RV	RV	RV	25	19	RV	RV
Harris	Not released						—	—	—	RV	RV	RV	25	18	23	Not released
BCS	Not released							—	—	—	—	—	23	17	25	Not released

== Game summaries ==
=== Towson ===
	1	2	3	4	Total
Tigers	0	7	0	14	21
Golden Flashes	17	10	7	7	41

This game is notable for a play that happened in the last minute of the second quarter. Kent State punted from the 50-yard line, and the ball touched, but was not caught by, Towson's returner, Derrick Joseph. It hit the ground and was recovered at the 7-yard line by Kent State linebacker Andre Parker, who then ran 58 yards the wrong way before two Towson players tackled him. However, a muffed punt cannot be advanced (or retreated) so Kent State simply took possession of the ball at the 7-yard line for the remainder of the half, and kicked a field goal before it ended.

=== @ Kentucky ===
	1	2	3	4	Total
Golden Flashes	0	7	0	7	14
Wildcats	0	17	16	14	47

=== @ Buffalo ===
	1	2	3	4	Total
Golden Flashes	0	10	3	10	23
Bulls	0	7	0	0	7

=== Ball State ===
	1	2	3	4	Total
Cardinals	0	13	13	17	43
Golden Flashes	0	21	14	10	45

=== @ Eastern Michigan ===
	1	2	3	4	Total
Golden Flashes	3	14	21	3	41
Eagles	0	7	0	7	14

=== @ Army ===
	1	2	3	4	Total
Golden Flashes	0	14	10	7	31
Black Knights	0	0	3	14	17

=== Western Michigan ===
	1	2	3	4	Total
Broncos	7	3	14	0	24
Golden Flashes	7	10	7	17	41

=== @ #15 Rutgers ===
	1	2	3	4	Total
Golden Flashes	7	14	7	7	35
#15 Scarlet Knights	3	7	7	6	23

=== Akron ===
	1	2	3	4	Total
Zips	14	10	0	0	24
Golden Flashes	0	14	14	7	35

=== @ Miami (OH) ===
	1	2	3	4	Total
Golden Flashes	21	14	3	10	48
RedHawks	0	10	8	14	32

=== @ Bowling Green ===
	1	2	3	4	Total
#25 Golden Flashes	0	10	7	14	31
Falcons	0	10	7	7	24

=== Ohio ===
	1	2	3	4	Total
Bobcats	3	3	0	0	6
#23 Golden Flashes	21	0	0	7	28

=== #19 Northern Illinois (MAC Championship Game) ===
	1	2	3	4	OT	2OT	Total
#19 Huskies	3	14	10	7	3	7	44
#18 Golden Flashes	10	0	3	21	3	0	37

=== Arkansas State (GoDaddy.com Bowl) ===
	1	2	3	4	Total
Golden Flashes	0	10	3	0	13
Red Wolves	0	14	3	0	17
