= 2012 NCAA Division I FBS football rankings =

- Season: 2012
- Bowl season: 2012–13 bowl games
- Preseason No. 1: USC (AP); LSU (Coaches)
- End of season champions: Alabama
- Conference with most teams in final AP poll: SEC (7)

Three human polls and one formula ranking make up the 2012 NCAA Division I FBS (Football Bowl Subdivision) football rankings, in addition to various publications' preseason polls. Unlike most sports, college football's governing body, the NCAA, does not bestow a national championship title. That title is bestowed by one or more of four different polling agencies. There are two main weekly polls that begin in the preseason—the AP Poll and the Coaches Poll. Two additional polls are released midway through the season; the Harris Interactive Poll is released after the sixth week of the season, and the Bowl Championship Series (BCS) standings are released after the seventh week. The Harris Poll and Coaches Poll are factors in the BCS standings. At the end of the regular season, on December 2, 2012, the BCS standings determined who would play in the BCS bowl games as well as the 2013 BCS National Championship Game on January 7, 2013, at Sun Life Stadium in Miami Gardens, Florida.

== Legend ==
	Increase in ranking
	Decrease in ranking
	Not ranked previous week
	Selected for BCS National Championship Game
(#–#)	Win–loss record
(Italics)	Number of first place votes
т	Tied with team above or below also with this symbol

== AP Poll ==
	Preseason Aug 18	Week 1 Sep 4	Week 2 Sep 9	Week 3 Sep 16	Week 4 Sep 23	Week 5 Sep 30	Week 6 Oct 7	Week 7 Oct 14	Week 8 Oct 21	Week 9 Oct 28	Week 10 Nov 4	Week 11 Nov 11	Week 12 Nov 18	Week 13 Nov 25	Week 14 Dec 2	Week 15 (Final) Jan 8	
1.	USC (25)	Alabama (1–0) (45)	Alabama (2–0) (48)	Alabama (3–0) (58)	Alabama (4–0) (59)	Alabama (5–0) (60)	Alabama (5–0) (60)	Alabama (6–0) (60)	Alabama (7–0) (59)	Alabama (8–0) (60)	Alabama (9–0) (60)	Oregon (10–0) (45)	Notre Dame (11–0) (60)	Notre Dame (12–0) (60)	Notre Dame (12–0) (60)	Alabama (13–1) (59)	1.
2.	Alabama (17)	USC (1–0) (11)	USC (2–0) (8)	LSU (3–0) (2)	Oregon (4–0)	Oregon (5–0)	Oregon (6–0)	Oregon (6–0)	Oregon (7–0)	Oregon (8–0)	Oregon (9–0)	Kansas State (10–0) (14)	Alabama (10–1)	Alabama (11–1)	Alabama (12–1)	Oregon (12–1)	2.
3.	LSU (16)	LSU (1–0) (4)	LSU (2–0) (4)	Oregon (3–0)	LSU (4–0) (1)	Florida State (5–0)	South Carolina (6–0)	Florida (6–0)	Florida (7–0) (1)	Kansas State (8–0)	Kansas State (9–0)	Notre Dame (10–0) (1)	Georgia (10–1)	Georgia (11–1)	Ohio State (12–0)	Ohio State (12–0)	3.
4.	Oklahoma (1)	Oregon (1–0)	Oregon (2–0)	Florida State (3–0)	Florida State (4–0)	LSU (5–0)	Florida (5–0)	Kansas State (6–0)	Kansas State (7–0)	Notre Dame (8–0)	Notre Dame (9–0)	Alabama (9–1)	Ohio State (11–0)	Ohio State (12–0)	Florida (11–1)	Notre Dame (12–1)	4.
5.	Oregon	Oklahoma (1–0)	Florida State (2–0) т	Georgia (3–0)	Georgia (4–0)	Georgia (5–0)	West Virginia (5–0)	Notre Dame (6–0)	Notre Dame (7–0)	LSU (7–1)	Georgia (8–1) т	Georgia (9–1)	Oregon (10–1)	Florida (11–1)	Oregon (11–1)	Georgia т (12–2)	5.
6.	Georgia	Florida State (1–0)	Oklahoma (2–0) т	Oklahoma (2–0)	South Carolina (4–0)	South Carolina (5–0)	Kansas State (5–0)	LSU (6–1)	LSU (7–1)	Ohio State (9–0)	Ohio State (10–0) т	Ohio State (10–0)	Florida (10–1)	Oregon (11–1)	Georgia (11–2)	Texas A&M т (11–2)	6.
7.	Florida State	Georgia (1–0)	Georgia (2–0)	South Carolina (3–0)	Kansas State (4–0)	Kansas State (4–0)	Notre Dame (5–0)	Ohio State (7–0)	Oregon State (6–0)	Georgia (7–1)	Florida (8–1)	Florida (9–1)	Kansas State (10–1)	Kansas State (10–1)	Kansas State (11–1)	Stanford (12–2)	7.
8.	Michigan (1)	Arkansas (1–0)	South Carolina (2–0)	West Virginia (2–0)	Stanford (3–0)	West Virginia (4–0)	Ohio State (6–0)	Oregon State (5–0)	Oklahoma (5–1)	Florida (7–1)	Florida State (8–1)	LSU (8–2)	LSU (9–2)	Stanford (10–2)	Stanford (11–2)	South Carolina (11–2)	8.
9.	South Carolina	South Carolina (1–0) т	West Virginia (1–0)	Stanford (3–0)	West Virginia (3–0)	Notre Dame (4–0)	LSU (5–1)	South Carolina (6–1)	Ohio State (8–0)	Florida State (8–1)	LSU (7–2)	Texas A&M (8–2)	Texas A&M (9–2)	LSU (10–2)	LSU (10–2)	Florida (11–2)	9.
10.	Arkansas	West Virginia (1–0) т	Michigan State (2–0)	Clemson (3–0)	Notre Dame (4–0)	Florida (4–0)	Oregon State (4–0)	Oklahoma (4–1)	USC (6–1)	Clemson (7–1)	Clemson (8–1)	Florida State (9–1)	Florida State (10–1)	Texas A&M (10–2)	Texas A&M (10–2)	Florida State (12–2)	10.
11.	West Virginia	Michigan State (1–0)	Clemson (2–0)	Notre Dame (3–0)	Florida (4–0)	Texas (4–0)	USC (4–1)	USC (5–1)	Florida State (7–1)	South Carolina (7–2)	Louisville (9–0)	Clemson (9–1)	Stanford (9–2)	South Carolina (10–2)	South Carolina (10–2)	Clemson (11–2)	11.
12.	Wisconsin	Clemson (1–0)	Ohio State (2–0)	Texas (3–0)	Texas (3–0)	Ohio State (5–0)	Florida State (5–1)	Florida State (6–1)	Georgia (6–1)	Louisville (8–0)	South Carolina (7–2)	South Carolina (8–2)	Clemson (10–1)	Oklahoma (9–2)	Oklahoma (10–2)	Kansas State (11–2)	12.
13.	Michigan State	Wisconsin (1–0)	Virginia Tech (2–0)	USC (2–1)	USC (3–1)	USC (3–1)	Oklahoma (3–1)	Georgia (5–1)	Mississippi State (7–0)	Oregon State (6–1)	Oregon State (7–1)	Oklahoma (7–2)	South Carolina (9–2)	Florida State (10–2)	Florida State (11–2)	Louisville (11–2)	13.
14.	Clemson	Ohio State (1–0)	Texas (2–0)	Florida (3–0)	Ohio State (4–0)	Oregon State (3–0)	Georgia (5–1)	Clemson (5–1)	Clemson (6–1)	Oklahoma (5–2)	Oklahoma (6–2)	Stanford (8–2)	Oklahoma (8–2)	Nebraska (10–2)	Clemson (10–2)	LSU (10–3)	14.
15.	Texas	Virginia Tech (1–0)	Kansas State (2–0)	Kansas State (3–0)	TCU (3–0)	Clemson (4–1) т	Texas (4–1)	Mississippi State (5–0)	Texas Tech (6–1)	Stanford (6–2)	Texas A&M (7–2)	Oregon State (7–2)	UCLA (9–2)	Clemson (10–2)	Oregon State (9–3)	Oklahoma (10–3)	15.
16.	Virginia Tech	Nebraska (1–0)	TCU (1–0)	Ohio State (3–0)	Oklahoma (2–1)	TCU (4–0) т	Clemson (5–1)	Louisville (6–0)	Louisville (7–0)	Texas A&M (6–2)	Stanford (7–2)	Nebraska (8–2)	Oregon State (8–2)	Oregon State (8–3)	Northern Illinois (12–1)	Utah State (11–2)	16.
17.	Nebraska	Texas (1–0)	Michigan (1–1)	TCU (2–0)	Clemson (3–1)	Oklahoma (2–1)	Stanford (4–1)	West Virginia (5–1)	South Carolina (6–2)	Mississippi State (7–1)	UCLA (7–2)	UCLA (8–2)	Nebraska (9–2)	UCLA (9–3)	UCLA (9–4)	Northwestern (10–3)	17.
18.	Ohio State	Oklahoma State (1–0)	Florida (2–0)	Michigan (2–1)	Oregon State (2–0)	Stanford (3–1)	Louisville (5–0)	Texas Tech (5–1)	Rutgers (7–0)	USC (6–2)	Nebraska (7–2)	Texas (8–2)	Texas (8–2)	Kent State (11–1)	Utah State (10–2)	Boise State (11–2)	18.
19.	Oklahoma State	Michigan (0–1)	Louisville (2–0)	UCLA (3–0)	Louisville (4–0)	Louisville (5–0)	Mississippi State (5–0)	Rutgers (6–0)	Stanford (5–2)	Boise State (7–1)	Louisiana Tech (8–1) т	Louisiana Tech (9–1)	Louisville (9–1)	Northern Illinois (11–1)	Michigan (8–4)	Texas (9–4)	19.
20.	TCU	TCU (0–0)	Notre Dame (2–0)	Louisville (3–0)	Michigan State (3–1)	Mississippi State (4–0)	Rutgers (5–0)	Texas A&M (5–1)	Michigan (5–2)	Texas Tech (6–2)	Texas (7–2) т	Louisville (9–1)	Michigan (8–3)	Utah State (10–2)	Boise State (10–2)	Oregon State (9–4)	20.
21.	Stanford	Kansas State (1–0)	Stanford (2–0)	Michigan State (2–1)	Mississippi State (4–0)	Nebraska (4–1)	Cincinnati (4–0)	Cincinnati (5–0)	Boise State (6–1)	Nebraska (6–2)	USC (6–3)	USC (7–3)	Rutgers (9–1)	Michigan (8–4)	Northwestern (9–3)	San Jose State (11–2)	21.
22.	Kansas State	Notre Dame (1–0)	UCLA (2–0)	Arizona (3–0)	Nebraska (3–1)	Rutgers (4–0)	Texas A&M (4–1)	Stanford (4–2)	Texas A&M (5–2)	Louisiana Tech (7–1)	Mississippi State (7–2)	Rutgers (8–1)	Oklahoma State (7–3)	Northwestern (9–3)	Louisville (10–2)	Northern Illinois (12–2)	22.
23.	Florida	Louisville (1–0)	Tennessee (2–0)	Mississippi State (3–0)	Rutgers (4–0)	Washington (3–1)	Louisiana Tech (5–0)	Michigan (4–2)	Ohio (7–0)	West Virginia (5–2)	Toledo (8–1)	Michigan (7–3) т	Kent State (10–1)	Texas (8–3)	Nebraska (10–3)	Vanderbilt (9–4)	23.
24.	Boise State	Florida (1–0)	Arizona (2–0)	Boise State (1–1)	Boise State (2–1)	Northwestern (5–0)	Boise State (4–1)	Boise State (5–1)	Louisiana Tech (6–1)	Arizona (5–3)	Rutgers (7–1)	Texas Tech (7–3) т	Northern Illinois (10–1)	Oklahoma State (7–4)	San Jose State (10–2)	Michigan (8–5)	24.
25.	Louisville	Stanford (1–0)	BYU (2–0)	Nebraska (2–1)	Baylor (3–0)	UCLA (4–1)	Michigan (3–2)	Ohio (7–0)	West Virginia (5–2)	UCLA (6–2)	Texas Tech (6–3)	Kent State (9–1)	Mississippi State (8–3) т; Utah State (9–2) т	Boise State (9–2)	Kent State (11–2)	Nebraska (10–4)	25.
	Preseason Aug 18	Week 1 Sep 4	Week 2 Sep 9	Week 3 Sep 16	Week 4 Sep 23	Week 5 Sep 30	Week 6 Oct 7	Week 7 Oct 14	Week 8 Oct 21	Week 9 Oct 28	Week 10 Nov 4	Week 11 Nov 11	Week 12 Nov 18	Week 13 Nov 25	Week 14 Dec 2	Week 15 (Final) Jan 8	
		Dropped: Boise State	Dropped: Arkansas; Wisconsin; Nebraska; Oklahoma State	Dropped: Virginia Tech; Tennessee; BYU	Dropped: Arizona; Michigan; UCLA	Dropped: Michigan State; Boise State; Baylor	Dropped: TCU; Nebraska; Washington; Northwestern; UCLA	Dropped: Texas; Louisiana Tech	Dropped: Cincinnati	Dropped: Rutgers; Michigan; Ohio	Dropped: Boise State; West Virginia; Arizona	Dropped: Mississippi State; Toledo	Dropped: Louisiana Tech; USC; Texas Tech	Dropped: Louisville; Rutgers; Mississippi State	Dropped: Texas; Oklahoma State	Dropped: UCLA; Kent State	

== Coaches Poll ==
	Preseason Aug 2	Week 1 Sep 4	Week 2 Sep 9	Week 3 Sep 16	Week 4 Sep 23	Week 5 Sep 30	Week 6 Oct 7	Week 7 Oct 14	Week 8 Oct 21	Week 9 Oct 28	Week 10 Nov 4	Week 11 Nov 11	Week 12 Nov 18	Week 13 Nov 25	Week 14 Dec 2	Week 15 (Final) Jan 8	
1.	LSU (18)	Alabama (1–0) (37)	Alabama (2–0) (42)	Alabama (3–0) (54)	Alabama (4–0) (57)	Alabama (5–0) (57)	Alabama (5–0) (58)	Alabama (6–0) (59)	Alabama (7–0) (59)	Alabama (8–0) (59)	Alabama (9–0) (59)	Oregon (10–0) (44)	Notre Dame (11–0) (56)	Notre Dame (12–0) (56)	Notre Dame (12–0) (56)	Alabama (13–1) (56)	1.
2.	Alabama (20)	USC (1–0) (14)	LSU (2–0) (5)	LSU (3–0) (5)	Oregon (4–0)	Oregon (5–0)	Oregon (6–0) (1)	Oregon (6–0)	Oregon (7–0)	Oregon (8–0)	Oregon (9–0)	Kansas State (10–0) (14)	Alabama (10–1) (2)	Alabama (11–1) (2)	Alabama (12–1) (3)	Oregon (12–1)	2.
3.	USC (19)	LSU (1–0) (7)	USC (2–0) (11)	Oregon (3–0)	LSU (4–0) (1)	LSU (5–0) (1)	South Carolina (6–0)	Kansas State (6–0)	Florida (7–0)	Kansas State (8–0)	Kansas State (9–0)	Notre Dame (10–0) (1)	Georgia (10–1) (1)	Georgia (11–1) (1)	Oregon (11–1)	Notre Dame (12–1)	3.
4.	Oklahoma (1)	Oregon (1–0) (1)	Oregon (2–0) (1)	Florida State (3–0)	Florida State (4–0) (1)	Florida State (5–0) (1)	West Virginia (5–0)	Florida (6–0)	Kansas State (7–0)	Notre Dame (8–0)	Notre Dame (9–0)	Georgia (9–1)	Oregon (10–1)	Oregon (11–1)	Florida (11–1)	Georgia (12–2)	4.
5.	Oregon	Oklahoma (1–0)	Oklahoma (2–0)	Oklahoma (2–0)	Georgia (4–0)	Georgia (5–0)	Kansas State (5–0)	Notre Dame (6–0)	Notre Dame (7–0)	LSU (7–1)	Georgia (8–1)	Alabama (9–1)	Florida State (10–1)	Florida (11–1)	Georgia (11–2)	Texas A&M (11–2)	5.
6.	Georgia	Florida State (1–0)	Florida State (2–0)	Georgia (3–0)	South Carolina (4–0)	South Carolina (5–0)	Notre Dame (5–0)	LSU (6–1)	LSU (7–1)	Georgia (7–1)	Florida State (8–1)	Florida State (9–1)	Florida (10–1)	LSU (10–2)	Kansas State (11–1)	Stanford (12–2)	6.
7.	Florida State (1)	Georgia (1–0)	Georgia (2–0)	West Virginia (2–0)	West Virginia (3–0)	West Virginia (4–0)	Florida (5–0)	Oklahoma (4–1)	Oklahoma (5–1)	Florida State (8–1)	Florida (8–1)	Florida (9–1)	LSU (9–2)	Kansas State (10–1)	LSU (10–2)	South Carolina (11–2)	7.
8.	Michigan	West Virginia (1–0)	West Virginia (1–0)	South Carolina (3–0)	Kansas State (4–0)	Kansas State (4–0)	LSU (5–1)	South Carolina (6–1)	USC (6–1)	Florida (7–1)	Clemson (8–1)	LSU (8–2)	Kansas State (10–1)	Texas A&M (10–2)	Stanford (11–2)	Florida State (12–2)	8.
9.	South Carolina	South Carolina (1–0)	South Carolina (2–0)	Clemson (3–0)	Stanford (3–0)	Texas (4–0)	USC (4–1)	USC (5–1)	Oregon State (6–0)	Clemson (7–1)	LSU (7–2)	Clemson (9–1)	Clemson (10–1)	Stanford (10–2)	Texas A&M (10–2)	Clemson (11–2)	9.
10.	Arkansas	Arkansas (1–0)	Michigan State (2–0)	Texas (3–0)	Texas (3–0)	Notre Dame (4–0)	Oklahoma (3–1)	Florida State (6–1)	Florida State (7–1)	Louisville (8–0)	Louisville (9–0)	Texas A&M (8–2)	Texas A&M (9–2)	South Carolina (10–2)	South Carolina (10–2)	Florida (11–2)	10.
11.	West Virginia	Michigan State (1–0)	Clemson (2–0)	Stanford (3–0)	Notre Dame (4–0)	Florida (4–0)	Florida State (5–1)	Oregon State (5–0)	Georgia (6–1)	South Carolina (7–2)	South Carolina (7–2)	South Carolina (8–2)	Stanford (9–2)	Oklahoma (9–2)	Oklahoma (10–2)	Kansas State (11–2)	11.
12.	Wisconsin	Clemson (1–0)	Texas (2–0)	USC (2–1)	Florida (4–0)	USC (3–1)	Georgia (5–1)	Georgia (5–1)	Mississippi State (7–0)	Oklahoma (5–2)	Oregon State (7–1)	Oklahoma (7–2)	South Carolina (9–2)	Florida State (10–2)	Florida State (11–2)	LSU (10–3)	12.
13.	Michigan State	Wisconsin (1–0)	Virginia Tech (2–0)	Kansas State (3–0)	USC (3–1)	TCU (4–0)	Clemson (5–1)	Clemson (5–1)	Clemson (6–1)	Oregon State (6–1)	Oklahoma (6–2)	Stanford (8–2)	Oklahoma (8–2)	Nebraska (10–2)	Clemson (10–2)	Louisville (11–2)	13.
14.	Clemson	Nebraska (1–0)	Kansas State (2–0)	Florida (3–0)	TCU (3–0)	Oklahoma (2–1)	Oregon State (4–0)	Louisville (6–0)	Louisville (7–0)	Boise State (7–1)	Texas A&M (7–2)	Nebraska (8–2)	Nebraska (9–2)	Clemson (10–2)	Oregon State (9–3)	Boise State (11–2)	14.
15.	Texas	Texas (1–0)	TCU (2–0)	Notre Dame (3–0)	Oklahoma (2–1)	Clemson (4–1)	Texas (4–1)	West Virginia (5–1)	Rutgers (7–0)	Stanford (6–2)	Stanford (7–2)	Texas (8–2)	Texas (8–2)	Boise State (9–2)	Boise State (10–2)	Oklahoma (10–3)	15.
16.	Nebraska	Oklahoma State (1–0)	Stanford (2–0)	TCU (2–0)	Clemson (3–1)	Louisville (5–0)	Louisville (5–0)	Mississippi State (6–0)	South Carolina (6–2)	Texas A&M (6–2)	Nebraska (7–2)	UCLA (8–2)	UCLA (9–2)	UCLA (9–3)	Northern Illinois (12–1)	Northwestern (10–3)	16.
17.	TCU	TCU (0–0)	Florida (2–0)	Michigan (2–1)	Louisville (4–0)	Oregon State (3–0)	Stanford (4–1)	Rutgers (6–0)	Texas Tech (6–1)	USC (6–2)	Texas (7–2)	Oregon State (7–2)	Oregon State (8–2)	Oregon State (8–3)	Northwestern (9–3)	Utah State (11–2)	17.
18.	Stanford	Virginia Tech (1–0)	Michigan (1–1)	Louisville (3–0)	Michigan State (3–1)	Stanford (3–1)	Mississippi State (5–0)	Cincinnati (5–0)	Boise State (6–1)	Mississippi State (7–1)	Louisiana Tech (8–1)	Louisville (9–1)	Louisville (9–1)	Northern Illinois (11–1)	Louisville (10–2)	Texas (9–4)	18.
19.	Oklahoma State	Michigan (0–1)	Notre Dame (2–0)	UCLA (3–0)	Mississippi State (4–0)	Mississippi State (4–0)	Rutgers (5–0)	Texas A&M (5–1)	Stanford (5–2)	West Virginia (5–2)	UCLA (7–2)	Louisiana Tech (9–1)	Rutgers (9–1)	Kent State (11–1)	UCLA (9–4)	Oregon State (9–4)	19.
20.	Virginia Tech	Kansas State (1–0)	Louisville (2–0)	Michigan State (2–1)	Nebraska (3–1)	Nebraska (4–1)	Cincinnati (4–0)	Texas Tech (5–1)	Michigan (5–2)	Texas Tech (6–2)	Rutgers (7–1)	Rutgers (8–1)	Michigan (8–3)	Northwestern (9–3)	Utah State (10–2)	Vanderbilt (9–4)	20.
21.	Kansas State	Stanford (1–0)	Arkansas (1–1)	Arizona (3–0)	Oregon State (2–0)	Rutgers (4–1)	Texas A&M (4–1)	TCU (5–1)	Texas A&M (5–2)	Nebraska (6–2)	Northwestern (7–2)	USC (7–3)	Oklahoma State (7–3)	Texas (8–3)	Nebraska (10–3)	San Jose State (11–2)	21.
22.	Boise State	Notre Dame (1–0)	Wisconsin (1–1)	Nebraska (2–1)	Oklahoma State (2–1)	Northwestern (5–0)	Boise State (4–1)	Boise State (5–1)	West Virginia (5–2)	Texas (6–2)	USC (6–3)	Boise State (8–2)	Boise State (9–2)	Utah State (10–2)	Michigan (8–4)	Cincinnati (10–3)	22.
23.	Florida	Florida (1–0)	UCLA (2–0)	Mississippi State (3–0)	Wisconsin (3–1)	Cincinnati (3–0)	TCU (4–1)	Stanford (4–2)	Ohio (7–0)	Louisiana Tech (7–1)	Mississippi State (7–2)	Michigan (7–3)	Northern Illinois (10–1)	Louisville (9–2)	Wisconsin (8–5)	Nebraska (10–4)	23.
24.	Notre Dame	Louisville (1–0)	Nebraska (1–1)	Wisconsin (2–1)	Baylor (3–0)	Texas Tech (4–0)	Louisiana Tech (5–0)	Arizona State (5–1)	Texas (5–2)	Oklahoma State (5–2)	Boise State (7–2)	Oklahoma State (6–3)	Mississippi State (8–3)	Michigan (8–4)	San Jose State (10–2)	Northern Illinois (12–2)	24.
25.	Auburn	Boise State (0–1)	Arizona (2–0)	Oklahoma State (2–1)	Rutgers (4–0) т; Virginia Tech (3–1) т	Boise State (3–1)	Iowa State (4–1)	Michigan (4–2)	Wisconsin (6–2)	Rutgers (7–1)	Toledo (8–1)	Texas Tech (7–3)	Kent State (10–1)	Rutgers (9–2)	Texas (8–4)	Tulsa (11–3)	25.
	Preseason Aug 2	Week 1 Sep 4	Week 2 Sep 9	Week 3 Sep 16	Week 4 Sep 23	Week 5 Sep 30	Week 6 Oct 7	Week 7 Oct 14	Week 8 Oct 21	Week 9 Oct 28	Week 10 Nov 4	Week 11 Nov 11	Week 12 Nov 18	Week 13 Nov 25	Week 14 Dec 2	Week 15 (Final) Jan 8	
		Dropped: Auburn	Dropped: Boise State; Oklahoma State	Dropped: Virginia Tech; Arkansas	Dropped: Arizona; Michigan; UCLA	Dropped: Michigan State; Oklahoma State; Wisconsin; Baylor; Virginia Tech	Dropped: Nebraska; Northwestern; Texas Tech	Dropped: Texas; Louisiana Tech; Iowa State	Dropped: Cincinnati; TCU; Arizona State	Dropped: Michigan; Ohio; Wisconsin	Dropped: West Virginia; Texas Tech; Oklahoma State	Dropped: Northwestern; Mississippi State; Toledo	Dropped: Louisiana Tech; USC; Texas Tech	Dropped: Oklahoma State; Mississippi State	Dropped: Kent State; Rutgers	Dropped: UCLA; Michigan; Wisconsin	

== Harris Interactive Poll ==
	Week 6 Oct 7	Week 7 Oct 14	Week 8 Oct 21	Week 9 Oct 28	Week 10 Nov 4	Week 11 Nov 11	Week 12 Nov 18	Week 13 Nov 25	Week 14 (Final) Dec 2	
1.	Alabama (5–0) (108)	Alabama (6–0) (110)	Alabama (7–0) (109)	Alabama (8–0) (109)	Alabama (9–0) (108)	Oregon (10–0) (90)	Notre Dame (11–0) (107)	Notre Dame (12–0) (109)	Notre Dame (12–0) (106)	1.
2.	Oregon (6–0) (5)	Oregon (6–0) (5)	Oregon (7–0) (5)	Oregon (8–0) (5)	Oregon (9–0) (6)	Kansas State (10–0) (23)	Alabama (10–1) (8)	Alabama (11–1) (6)	Alabama (12–1) (9)	2.
3.	South Carolina (6–0)	Florida (6–0)	Florida (7–0) (1)	Kansas State (8–0) (1)	Kansas State (9–0) (1)	Notre Dame (10–0) (1)	Georgia (10–1)	Georgia (11–1)	Oregon (11–1)	3.
4.	West Virginia (5–0)	Kansas State (6–0)	Kansas State (7–0)	Notre Dame (8–0)	Notre Dame (9–0)	Alabama (9–1) (1)	Oregon (10–1)	Oregon (11–1)	Florida (11–1)	4.
5.	Kansas State (5–0)	Notre Dame (6–0)	Notre Dame (7–0)	LSU (7–1)	Georgia (8–1)	Georgia (9–1)	Florida (10–1)	Florida (11–1)	Georgia (11–2)	5.
6.	Florida (5–0)	LSU (6–1)	LSU (7–1)	Georgia (7–1)	Florida State (8–1)	Florida State (9–1)	Florida State (10–1)	Kansas State (10–1)	Kansas State (11–1)	6.
7.	Notre Dame (5–0)	South Carolina (6–1)	Oklahoma (5–1)	Florida State (8–1)	Florida (8–1)	Florida (9–1)	Kansas State (10–1)	LSU (10–2)	Stanford (11–2)	7.
8.	LSU (5–1)	Florida State (6–1)	Oregon State (6–0)	Florida (7–1)	LSU (7–2)	LSU (8–2)	LSU (9–2)	Stanford (10–2)	LSU (10–2)	8.
9.	Florida State (5–1)	Oklahoma (4–1)	USC (6–1)	Clemson (7–1)	Clemson (8–1)	Clemson (9–1)	Clemson (10–1)	Texas A&M (10–2)	Texas A&M (10–2)	9.
10.	USC (4–1)	Oregon State (5–0)	Florida State (7–1)	Louisville (7–1)	Louisville (9–0)	Texas A&M (8–2)	Texas A&M (9–2)	South Carolina (10–2)	South Carolina (10–2)	10.
11.	Georgia (5–1)	USC (5–1)	Georgia (6–1)	South Carolina (7–2)	South Carolina (7–2)	South Carolina (8–2)	Stanford (9–2)	Oklahoma (9–2)	Oklahoma (10–2)	11.
12.	Oregon State (4–0)	Georgia (5–1)	Mississippi State (7–0)	Oklahoma (5–2)	Oregon State (7–1)	Oklahoma (7–2)	South Carolina (9–2)	Florida State (10–2)	Florida State (11–2)	12.
13.	Oklahoma (3–1)	Clemson (5–1)	Clemson (6–1)	Oregon State (6–1)	Oklahoma (6–2)	Stanford (8–2)	Oklahoma (8–2)	Nebraska (10–2)	Clemson (10–2)	13.
14.	Clemson (5–1)	Mississippi State (6–0)	Louisville (7–0)	Stanford (6–2)	Stanford (7–2)	Nebraska (8–2)	Nebraska (9–2)	Clemson (10–2)	Oregon State (9–3)	14.
15.	Texas (4–1)	West Virginia (5–1)	Rutgers (7–0)	Mississippi State (7–1)	Texas A&M (7–2)	Texas (8–2)	Oregon State (8–2)	Oregon State (8–3)	Boise State (10–2)	15.
16.	Stanford (4–1)	Louisville (6–0)	South Carolina (6–2)	USC (6–2)	Nebraska (7–2)	Oregon State (7–2)	UCLA (9–2)	UCLA (9–3)	Northern Illinois (12–1)	16.
17.	Mississippi State (5–0)	Rutgers (6–0)	Texas Tech (6–1)	Boise State (7–1)	Texas (7–2)	Louisville (9–1)	Texas (8–2)	Boise State (9–2)	UCLA (9–4)	17.
18.	Louisville (5–0)	Cincinnati (5–0)	Stanford (5–2)	Texas A&M (6–2)	USC (6–3)	USC (7–3)	Louisville (9–1)	Kent State (11–1)	Nebraska (10–3)	18.
19.	Rutgers (5–0)	Texas A&M (5–1)	Boise State (6–1)	Texas Tech (6–2)	Louisiana Tech (8–1)	UCLA (8–2)	Rutgers (9–1)	Northern Illinois (11–1)	Louisville (10–2)	19.
20.	Cincinnati (4–0)	Stanford (4–2)	Michigan (5–2)	West Virginia (5–2)	Mississippi State (7–2)	Louisiana Tech (9–1)	Michigan (8–3)	Texas (8–3)	Northwestern (9–3)	20.
21.	TCU (4–1)	Texas Tech (5–1)	Texas A&M (5–2)	Nebraska (6–2)	UCLA (7–2)	Rutgers (8–1)	Boise State (9–2)	Northwestern (9–3)	Utah State (10–2)	21.
22.	Boise State (4–1)	TCU (5–1)	West Virginia (5–2)	Texas (6–2)	Rutgers (7–1)	Texas Tech (7–3)	Oklahoma State (7–3)	Utah State (10–2)	Michigan (8–4)	22.
23.	Texas A&M (4–1)	Boise State (5–1)	Ohio (7–0)	Rutgers (7–1)	Boise State (7–2)	Boise State (8–2)	Mississippi State (8–3)	Michigan (8–4)	Kent State (11–2)	23.
24.	Louisiana Tech (5–0)	Arizona State (5–1)	Texas (5–2)	Louisiana Tech (7–1)	Northwestern (7–2)	Michigan (7–3)	Northern Illinois (10–1)	Louisville (9–2)	Texas (8–4)	24.
25.	Iowa State (4–1)	Texas (4–2)	TCU (5–2)	Oklahoma State (5–2)	Texas Tech (6–3)	Mississippi State (7–3)	Kent State (10–1)	Oklahoma State (7–4)	Wisconsin (8–5)	25.
	Week 6 Oct 7	Week 7 Oct 14	Week 8 Oct 21	Week 9 Oct 28	Week 10 Nov 4	Week 11 Nov 11	Week 12 Nov 18	Week 13 Nov 25	Week 14 (Final) Dec 2	
		Dropped: Louisiana Tech; Iowa State	Dropped: Cincinnati; Arizona State	Dropped: Michigan; Ohio; TCU	Dropped: West Virginia; Oklahoma State	Dropped: Northwestern	Dropped: USC; Louisiana Tech; Texas Tech	Dropped: Rutgers; Mississippi State	Dropped: Oklahoma State	

== BCS standings ==
	Week 7 Oct 14	Week 8 Oct 21	Week 9 Oct 28	Week 10 Nov 4	Week 11 Nov 11	Week 12 Nov 18	Week 13 Nov 25	Week 14 (Final) Dec 2	
1.	Alabama (6–0)	Alabama (7–0)	Alabama (8–0)	Alabama (9–0)	Kansas State (10–0)	Notre Dame (11–0)	Notre Dame (12–0)	Notre Dame (12–0)	1.
2.	Florida (6–0)	Florida (7–0)	Kansas State (8–0)	Kansas State (9–0)	Oregon (10–0)	Alabama (10–1)	Alabama (11–1)	Alabama (12–1)	2.
3.	Oregon (6–0)	Kansas State (7–0)	Notre Dame (8–0)	Oregon (9–0)	Notre Dame (10–0)	Georgia (10–1)	Georgia (11–1)	Florida (11–1)	3.
4.	Kansas State (6–0)	Oregon (7–0)	Oregon (8–0)	Notre Dame (9–0)	Alabama (9–1)	Florida (10–1)	Florida (11–1)	Oregon (11–1)	4.
5.	Notre Dame (6–0)	Notre Dame (7–0)	LSU (7–1)	Georgia (8–1)	Georgia (9–1)	Oregon (10–1)	Oregon (11–1)	Kansas State (11–1)	5.
6.	LSU (6–1)	LSU (7–1)	Georgia (7–1)	Florida (8–1)	Florida (9–1)	Kansas State (10–1)	Kansas State (10–1)	Stanford (11–2)	6.
7.	South Carolina (6–1)	Oregon State (6–0)	Florida (7–1)	LSU (7–2)	LSU (8–2)	LSU (9–2)	LSU (10–2)	Georgia (11–2)	7.
8.	Oregon State (6–0)	Oklahoma (5–1)	South Carolina (7–2)	South Carolina (7–2)	Texas A&M (8–2)	Stanford (9–2)	Stanford (10–2)	LSU (10–2)	8.
9.	Oklahoma (4–1)	USC (6–1)	Florida State (8–1)	Louisville (9–0)	South Carolina (8–2)	Texas A&M (9–2)	Texas A&M (10–2)	Texas A&M (10–2)	9.
10.	USC (5–1)	Georgia (6–1)	Louisville (8–0)	Florida State (8–1)	Florida State (9–1)	Florida State (10–1)	South Carolina (10–2)	South Carolina (10–2)	10.
11.	Georgia (5–1)	Mississippi State (7–0)	Oregon State (6–1)	Oregon State (7–1)	Clemson (9–1)	Clemson (10–1)	Oklahoma (9–2)	Oklahoma (10–2)	11.
12.	Mississippi State (6–0)	Florida State (7–1)	Oklahoma (5–2)	Oklahoma (6–2)	Oklahoma (7–2)	South Carolina (9–2)	Nebraska (10–2)	Florida State (11–2)	12.
13.	West Virginia (5–1)	South Carolina (6–2)	Clemson (7–1)	Clemson (8–1)	Stanford (8–2)	Oklahoma (8–2)	Florida State (10–2)	Oregon State (9–3)	13.
14.	Florida State (6–1)	Texas Tech (6–1)	Stanford (6–2)	Stanford (7–2)	Nebraska (8–2)	Nebraska (9–2)	Clemson (10–2)	Clemson (10–2)	14.
15.	Rutgers (6–0)	Rutgers (7–0)	Mississippi State (7–1)	Texas A&M (7–2)	Texas (8–2)	Oregon State (8–2)	Oregon State (8–3)	Northern Illinois (12–1)	15.
16.	Louisville (6–0)	Louisville (7–0)	Texas A&M (6–2)	Nebraska (7–2)	Oregon State (7–2)	Texas (8–2)	UCLA (9–3)	Nebraska (10–3)	16.
17.	Texas Tech (5–1)	Stanford (5–2)	USC (6–2)	Texas (7–2)	UCLA (8–2)	UCLA (9–2)	Kent State (11–1)	UCLA (9–4)	17.
18.	Texas A&M (5–1)	Clemson (6–1)	Texas Tech (6–2)	UCLA (7–2)	USC (7–3)	Rutgers (9–1)	Texas (8–3)	Michigan (8–4)	18.
19.	Clemson (5–1)	West Virginia (5–2)	Boise State (7–1)	USC (6–3)	Louisville (9–1)	Michigan (8–3)	Michigan (8–4)	Boise State (10–2)	19.
20.	Stanford (4–2)	Texas A&M (5–2)	Nebraska (6–2)	Louisiana Tech (8–1)	Louisiana Tech (9–1)	Louisville (9–1)	Boise State (9–2)	Northwestern (9–3)	20.
21.	Cincinnati (5–0)	Boise State (6–1)	West Virginia (5–2)	Mississippi State (7–2)	Michigan (7–3)	Oklahoma State (7–3)	Northern Illinois (11–1)	Louisville (10–2)	21.
22.	Boise State (5–1)	Michigan (5–2)	Arizona (5–3)	Texas Tech (6–3)	Rutgers (8–1)	Boise State (9–2)	Northwestern (9–3)	Utah State (10–2)	22.
23.	TCU (5–1)	Texas (5–2)	Texas (6–2)	Rutgers (7–1)	Texas Tech (7–3)	Kent State (10–1)	Oklahoma State (7–4)	Texas (8–4)	23.
24.	Iowa State (4–2)	Ohio (7–0)	Oklahoma State (5–2)	Northwestern (7–2)	Oklahoma State (6–3)	Arizona (7–4)	Utah State (10–2)	San Jose State (10–2)	24.
25.	Texas (4–2)	Wisconsin (6–2)	Louisiana Tech (7–1)	Toledo (8–1)	Washington (6–4)	Washington (7–4)	San Jose State (10–2)	Kent State (11–2)	25.
	Week 7 Oct 14	Week 8 Oct 21	Week 9 Oct 28	Week 10 Nov 4	Week 11 Nov 11	Week 12 Nov 18	Week 13 Nov 25	Week 14 (Final) Dec 2	
		Dropped: Cincinnati; TCU; Iowa State	Dropped: Rutgers; Michigan; Ohio; Wisconsin	Dropped: West Virginia; Arizona; Oklahoma State; Boise State	Dropped: Mississippi State; Toledo; Northwestern	Dropped: USC; Louisiana Tech; Texas Tech	Dropped: Rutgers; Louisville; Arizona; Washington	Dropped: Oklahoma State	
