= 2012 Northern Illinois Huskies football team =

American college football season

2012 Northern Illinois Huskies football

MAC champion MAC West Division champion

MAC Championship Game, W 44–37 ^{2OT} vs. Kent State

Orange Bowl, L 10–31 vs. Florida State
- Conference: Mid-American Conference
- West Division

Ranking
- Coaches: No. 24
- AP: No. 22
- Record: 12–2 (8–0 MAC)
- Head coach: Dave Doeren (2nd season; first 13 games); Rod Carey (interim, bowl game)
- Offensive coordinator: Mike Dunbar (1st season, game 1 and bowl game); Rod Carey (1st season, games 2–13)
- Offensive scheme: Multiple
- Defensive coordinator: Jay Niemann (2nd season)
- Co-defensive coordinator: Ryan Nielsen (1st season)
- Base defense: 4–3
- MVP: Jordan Lynch
- Captains: Nabal Jefferson; Jordan Lynch; Sean Progar; Jason Schepler
- Home stadium: Huskie Stadium

2012 Mid-American Conference football standings
	Conf.			Overall
Team	W		L	W		L
East Division
Kent State x	8	–	0	11	–	3
Bowling Green	6	–	2	8	–	5
Ohio	4	–	4	9	–	4
Buffalo	3	–	5	4	–	8
Miami (OH)	3	–	5	4	–	8
UMass	1	–	7	1	–	11
Akron	0	–	8	1	–	11
West Division
No. 22 Northern Illinois x$	8	–	0	12	–	2
Toledo	6	–	2	9	–	4
Ball State	6	–	2	9	–	4
Central Michigan	4	–	4	7	–	6
Western Michigan	2	–	6	4	–	8
Eastern Michigan	1	–	7	2	–	10
Championship: Northern Illinois 44, Kent State 37
$ – Conference champion and BCS representative as top non-AQ school to meet automatic qualification criteria; x – Division champion/co-champions; UMass not eligible for conference title or bowl game as part of FBS transition; Rankings from AP Poll

The 2012 Northern Illinois Huskies football team represented Northern Illinois University as a member of the West Division of the Mid-American Conference (MAC) during the 2012 NCAA Division I FBS football season. Northern Illinois compiled an overall record of 12–2 with a mark of 8–0 in conference play, winning the MAC West Division title. The Huskies advanced to the MAC Championship Game, where they beat Kent State to win the program's third MAC championship. Northern Illinois was invited to the Orange Bowl, where they lost to Florida State. Second-year head coach Dave Doeren led the team during the regular season and the MAC title game before resigning to become the head football coach at North Carolina State University. Rod Carey was appointed interim head coach for the bowl game. The team's 12 wins was the most in any of the program's 113-year history.

Since the MAC was a non-automatic qualifying (non-AQ) conference for the Bowl Championship Series, its conference champion had to finish 16th or higher in the BCS rankings and be ranked ahead of at least one AQ conference champion to qualify for a BCS game. With their win in the MAC Championship Game, the Huskies moved to No. 15 in the final BCS rankings, while Louisville, champion of the Big East Conference, was ranked No. 21. As a result, Northern Illinois received a BCS bid to the Orange Bowl. It was the first major-bowl appearance in program history and the first major-bowl appearance for any MAC team.

The season marked the Huskies' fifth consecutive trip to a bowl game. The team played home games at Huskie Stadium in DeKalb, Illinois.

== Schedule ==
Date	Time	Opponent	Rank	Site	TV	Result	Attendance	Source
September 1	2:30 p.m.	vs. Iowa*		Soldier Field; Chicago, IL	ESPNU	L 17–18	52,117	
September 8	6:00 p.m.	UT Martin*		Huskie Stadium; DeKalb, IL	ESPN3	W 35–7	16,010	
September 15	11:00 a.m.	at Army*		Michie Stadium; West Point, NY	CBSSN	W 41–40	30,176	
September 22	2:30 p.m.	Kansas*		Huskie Stadium; DeKalb, IL	ESPN3	W 30–23	18,374	
September 29	2:30 p.m.	Central Michigan		Huskie Stadium; DeKalb, IL	ESPN3	W 55–24	16,292	
October 6	1:00 p.m.	at Ball State		Scheumann Stadium; Muncie, IN (Bronze Stalk Trophy)	ESPN3	W 35–23	11,238	
October 13	2:30 p.m.	Buffalo^{†}		Huskie Stadium; DeKalb, IL	CSNC	W 45–3	14,419	
October 20	11:00 a.m.	at Akron		InfoCision Stadium–Summa Field; Akron, OH	ESPN Plus	W 37–7	7,074	
October 27	11:00 a.m.	at Western Michigan		Waldo Stadium; Kalamazoo, MI	ESPN Plus	W 48–34	12,974	
November 3	2:30 p.m.	UMass		Huskie Stadium; DeKalb, IL		W 63–0	11,114	
November 14	8:00 p.m.	Toledo		Huskie Stadium; DeKalb, IL	ESPN2	W 31–24	17,813	
November 23	12:00 p.m.	at Eastern Michigan	No. 24	Rynearson Stadium; Ypsilanti, MI	ESPN3	W 49–7	1,349	
November 30	6:00 p.m.	vs. No. 18 Kent State*	No. 19	Ford Field; Detroit, MI (MAC Championship Game)	ESPN2	W 44–37 ^{2OT}	18,132	
January 1, 2013	7:30 p.m.	vs. No. 13 Florida State*	No. 16	Sun Life Stadium; Miami Gardens, FL (Orange Bowl)	ESPN	L 10–31	72,073	
*Non-conference game; ^{†}Homecoming; Rankings from AP Poll released prior to the game; All times are in Central time

== Rankings ==
Ranking movements Legend: ██ Increase in ranking ██ Decrease in ranking — = Not ranked RV = Received votes
	Week															
Poll	Pre	1	2	3	4	5	6	7	8	9	10	11	12	13	14	Final
AP	RV	—	—	—	—	—	—	—	RV	RV	RV	RV	24	19	16	22
Coaches	RV	—	—	—	—	—	—	RV	RV	RV	RV	RV	23	18	16	24
Harris	Not released						—	—	RV	RV	RV	RV	24	19	16	Not released
BCS	Not released							—	—	—	—	—	—	21	15	Not released

== Game summaries ==
=== vs Iowa ===
	1	2	3	4	Total
Hawkeyes	3	3	3	9	18
Huskies	0	10	7	0	17

=== UT Martin ===
	1	2	3	4	Total
Skyhawks	0	0	0	7	7
Huskies	7	14	7	7	35

=== @ Army ===
	1	2	3	4	Total
Huskies	14	14	0	13	41
Black Knights	7	12	15	6	40

=== Kansas ===
	1	2	3	4	Total
Jayhawks	3	7	7	6	23
Huskies	6	7	0	17	30

=== Central Michigan ===
	1	2	3	4	Total
Chippewas	7	7	10	0	24
Huskies	14	10	10	21	55

=== @ Ball State ===
	1	2	3	4	Total
Huskies	7	7	7	14	35
Cardinals	3	13	7	0	23

=== Buffalo ===
	1	2	3	4	Total
Bulls	3	0	0	0	3
Huskies	7	21	14	3	45

=== @ Akron ===
	1	2	3	4	Total
Huskies	10	10	10	7	37
Zips	0	7	0	0	7

=== @ Western Michigan ===
	1	2	3	4	Total
Huskies	7	10	14	17	48
Broncos	14	7	0	13	34

=== Massachusetts ===
	1	2	3	4	Total
Minutemen	0	0	0	0	0
Huskies	14	21	21	7	63

=== Toledo ===
	1	2	3	4	Total
Rockets	7	7	0	10	24
Huskies	0	7	21	3	31

=== @ Eastern Michigan ===
	1	2	3	4	Total
#23 Huskies	14	14	7	14	49
Eagles	7	0	0	0	7

=== #18 Kent State (MAC Championship Game) ===
	1	2	3	4	OT	2OT	Total
#19 Huskies	3	14	10	7	3	7	44
#18 Golden Flashes	10	0	3	21	3	0	37

=== #12 Florida State (Orange Bowl) ===
	1	2	3	4	Total
#16 Huskies	3	0	7	0	10
#12 Seminoles	7	7	3	14	31

== Roster ==
2012 Northern Illinois Huskies football team roster
Players
Coaches
Offense

Pos.	#	Name	Class
OL	74	Dustin Adams	Fr
OL	64	Sal Arceo	Fr
WR	7	Perez Ashford	Sr
OL	66	Matt Battaglia	Sr
RB	25	Giorgio Bowers	So
WR	82	Juwan Brescasin	Fr
WR	86	Jacob Brinlee	Fr
WR	4	Da'Ron Brown	So
OL	68	Ron Brown	Fr
OL	78	Ryan Brown	So
OL	61	Aidan Conlon	Fr
FB	48	Ricky Connors	So
RB	3	Akeem Daniles	Jr
QB	19	Johnny Eagan	Fr
TE	83	Luke Eakes	So
RB	44	Perez Ford	Fr
C	59	Michael Gegner	So
WR	81	Clayton Glasper	Fr
QB	12	Drew Hare	Fr
RB	20	Keith Harris	Fr
TE	98	Lincoln Howard	Fr
OL	62	Patrick Husain	Jr
OL	73	Matt Killian	Fr
OL	79	Matt Krempel	Jr
WR	80	Tommylee Lewis	So
OL	75	Tyler Loos	So
QB	6	Jordan Lynch	Jr
TE	44	DeVonte' Majors	Fr
TE	37	Desroy Maxwell	Fr
QB	16	Matt McIntosh	Fr
WR	13	Charlie Miller	Fr
WR	1	Martel Moore	Sr
RB	26	Alex Morrow	Fr
OL	71	Levon Myers	Fr
OL	55	Andrew Ness	Fr
OL	65	Wes Ott	So
OL	70	Logan Pegram	Sr
OL	67	Tyler Pitt	So
OL	72	Josh Ruka	Fr
TE	87	Jason Schepler	Sr
WR	85	Angelo Sebastiano	Fr
TE	88	Tim Semisch	So
RB	23	Leighton Settle	Jr
RB	34	James Spencer	So
OL	76	Brad Steger	Fr
FB	47	Rob Sterling	So
RB	42	Cameron Stingly	So
TE	43	Jess Striedl	So
OL	57	Scott Taylor	Fr
TE	84	Kevin Tennenbaum	Fr
OL	77	Jared Volk	Jr
WR	22	Jamison Wells	Jr
QB	12	Matt Williams	Fr
RB	5	Jamal Womble	Sr

Defense

Pos.	#	Name	Class
DL	51	Zach Anderson	Jr
DE	53	Matthew Baltimore	Fr
LB	6	Jamaal Bass	So
DE	90	Alan Baxter	Sr
DT	93	Ken Bishop	Jr
CB	31	Anthony Brooks	Fr
LB	36	Tyrone Clark	Sr
DE	54	Cameron Clinton-Earl	Fr
LB	58	Mike Cotton	Fr
S	21	Dechane Durante	So
CB	2	Sean Evans	Jr
CB	28	Jhony Faustin	Jr
LB	8	Ladell Fleming	Fr
S	34	Connor Gavin	Fr
DT	94	Donovan Gordon	So
DE	50	Ryan Gorrell	So
DE	56	Daniel Green	Sr
CB	17	Marckie Hayes	So
LB	41	Cody Hazelett	Fr
DT	57	Cornellus Henry	Fr
DE	96	Michael Ippolito	Fr
CB	16	Charles Ivory	Fr
LB	40	Victor Jacques	Sr
DL	99	Nabal Jefferson	Sr
DT	92	Mario Jones	Fr
S	38	Rasheen Lemon	Fr
DE	63	Larry Lloyd	So
CB	29	Paris Logan	Fr
LB	45	Boomer Mays	Fr
CB	41	Nate McNeal	Jr
DE	49	Jason Meehan	So
CB	11	Rashan Melvin	Sr
CB	30	Marlon Moore	Fr
S	33	Tre' Moore	Fr
LB	35	Videl Nelson	Fr
DE	89	Stephen O'Neal	Jr
DE	95	Sean Progar	Sr
DE	46	George Rainey	Jr
LB	52	Michael Santacaterina	So
S	14	Courtney Stephen	Sr
S	19	Demetrius Stone	Sr
DT	69	Corey Thomas	Fr
DB	15	Jimmie Ward	Jr
CB	24	Dominique Ware	Jr
DL	91	Anthony Wells	Jr
DE	97	Joe Windsor	Jr
LB	27	Bobby Winkel	So

Special teams

Pos.	#	Name	Class
DS	84	Brian Mayer	So
P	18	Ryan Neir	Sr
DS		Bobby Ramlet	Fr
K	99	Mathew Sims	Jr
P	39	Mark Strbjak	Fr
PK	26	Tyler Wedel	So

Head coach

- Dave Doeren

Coordinators/assistant coaches

- Mike Dunbar – Offensive coordinator
- Ryan Nielsen – Co-defensive coord./defensive line/recruiting coord.
- Jay Niemann – Defensive coordinator/safeties
- Rod Carey – Assistant coach/offensive line/run game coordinator
- Bob Cole – Assistant coach/quarterbacks
- Frisman Jackson – Assistant coach/wide receivers
- Kevin Kane – Assistant coach/linebackers
- Richard McNutt – Assistant coach/cornerbacks
- Joe Tripodi – Graduate assistant/tight ends & Fullbacks
- Mike Uremovich – Assistant coach/running backs/special teams coord.
- Brad Ohrt – Director of sports performance
- Matt Lipman – Director of football operations
- Joe McKillip – Graduate assistant/Operations
- Zach Opsal – Graduate assistant/Video
- Peter Roley – Asst. Dir. Football Operations/Video

Legend

- (C) Team captain
- (S) Suspended
- (I) Ineligible
- Injured
- Redshirt

Roster
Last update: 7/14/12
