= 2008 Akron Zips football team =

American college football season

2008 Akron Zips football
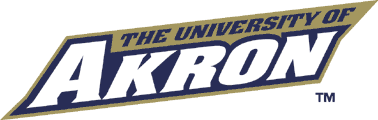
- Conference: Mid-American Conference
- East
- Record: 5–7 (3–5 MAC)
- Head coach: J. D. Brookhart (5th season)
- Offensive coordinator: Joe Moorhead (2nd season)
- Offensive scheme: Multiple
- Defensive coordinator: Jim Fleming (5th season)
- Base defense: 3–3–5
- Home stadium: Rubber Bowl

2008 Mid-American Conference football standings
	Conf.			Overall
Team	W		L	W		L
East Division
Buffalo x$	5	–	3	8	–	6
Bowling Green	4	–	4	6	–	6
Temple	4	–	4	5	–	7
Ohio	3	–	5	4	–	8
Akron	3	–	5	5	–	7
Kent State	3	–	5	4	–	8
Miami (OH)	1	–	7	2	–	10
West Division
Ball State x	8	–	0	12	–	2
Central Michigan	6	–	2	8	–	5
Western Michigan	6	–	2	9	–	4
Northern Illinois	5	–	3	6	–	7
Toledo	2	–	6	3	–	9
Eastern Michigan	2	–	6	3	–	9
Championship: Buffalo 42, Ball State 24
$ – Conference champion; x – Division champion/co-champions

The 2008 Akron Zips football team represented the University of Akron in the 2008 NCAA Division I FBS football season. Akron competed as a member of the Mid-American Conference (MAC) and played in the East Division.

== Before the season ==
2007 starter Reggie Corner was selected 114th overall in the fourth round of the 2008 NFL draft. He is the 15th player from Akron to be selected in the draft, and he is the fifth-highest historically. Four other players signed with professional teams in the National Football League. These players are:

- Jabari Arthur with the Kansas City Chiefs,
- Davanzo Tate with the New York Jets,
- Nate Robinson with the New York Giants, and
- Kris Kasparek with the Miami Dolphins.

Six different Akron players made their ways to Preseason All-MAC Teams. Five players were selected each for the teams published by MAC Report Online and Athlon. On the list published by MAC Report Online, Almondo Sewell was named First-Team Defense, and Bryan Williams as well as Andre Jones were named First-Team Specialists. Chris Kemme and Ryan Bain were named Second-Team Offense and Defense, respectively.

== Schedule ==
Date	Time	Opponent	Site	TV	Result	Attendance
August 30	Noon	at No. 13 Wisconsin*	Camp Randall Stadium; Madison, WI	BTN	L 17–38	80,910
September 6	3:30 p.m.	at Syracuse*	Carrier Dome; Syracuse, NY		W 42–28	31,808
September 13	1:00 p.m.	Ball State	Rubber Bowl; Akron, OH		L 24–41	9,013
September 20	1:00 p.m.	at Army*	Michie Stadium; West Point, NY		W 22–3	27,040
September 27	7:30 p.m.	Cincinnati*	Rubber Bowl; Akron, OH	FSN Ohio	L 15–17	16,927
October 4	Noon	at Kent State	Dix Stadium; Kent, OH (Battle for the Wagon Wheel)	ESPN+	W 30–27 ^{2OT}	18,536
October 11	6:00 p.m.	Bowling Green	Rubber Bowl; Akron, OH		L 33–37	17,119
October 18	1:00 p.m.	at Eastern Michigan	Rynearson Stadium; Ypsilanti, MI		W 42–35	17,055
November 5	7:00 p.m.	Toledo	Rubber Bowl; Akron, OH	ESPNU	W 47–30	10,134
November 13	7:00 p.m.	Buffalo	Rubber Bowl; Akron, OH	ESPNU	L 40–43 ^{4OT}	18,516
November 22	3:30 p.m.	at Ohio	Peden Stadium; Athens, OH		L 42–49	13,114
November 28	1:00 p.m.	at Temple	Lincoln Financial Field; Philadelphia, PA		L 6–27	11,234
*Non-conference game; Rankings from Coaches' Poll released prior to the game; All times are in Eastern time

== Game summaries ==
=== Wisconsin ===
at Camp Randall Stadium, Madison, Wisconsin

	1	2	3	4	Total
Zips	0	10	0	7	17
#13 Badgers	14	3	14	7	38

Scoring Summary

1st Quarter

- 10:37 WIS Graham 3-yard pass from Evridge (Welch kick) 7-0 WIS
- 7:20 WIS Hill 2-yard run (Welch kick) 14-0 WIS

2nd Quarter

- 14:52 WIS Welch 32-yard field goal 17-0 WIS
- 10:44 AKR Poindexter 3-yard pass from Jacquemain (Iveljic kick) 17-7 WIS
- 0:02 AKR Iveljic 26-yard field goal 17-10 WIS

3rd Quarter

- 10:00 WIS Hill 1-yard run (Welch kick) 24-10 WIS
- 6:20 WIS Brown 2-yard run (Welch kick) 31-10 WIS

4th Quarter

- 11:48 WIS Clay 9-yard run (Welch kick) 38-10 WIS
- 0:38 AKR Owen 11-yard pass from Jacquemain (Iveljic kick) 38-17 WIS

=== Syracuse ===
at the Carrier Dome, Syracuse, New York

	1	2	3	4	Total
Zips	14	14	0	14	42
Orange	0	14	7	7	28

Scoring Summary

1st Quarter

- 11:39 AKR Jones 33-yard pass from Jacquemain (Iveljic kick) 7-0 AKR
- 1:41 AKR Kennedy 35-yard run (Iveljic kick) 14-0 AKR

2nd Quarter

- 14:14 SYR Owen 32-yard pass from Dantley (Shadle kick) 14-7 AKR
- 7:35 AKR Allen 1-yard run (Iveljic kick) 21-7 AKR
- 2:17 SYR Brinkley 1-yard run (Shadle kick) 21-14 Akron
- 0:22 AKR Allen 1-yard run (Iveljic kick) 28-14 Akron

3rd Quarter

- 11:30 SYR Owen 4-yard pass from Dantley (Shadle kick) 28-21 Akron

4th Quarter

- 12:56 SYR Provo 15-yard pass from Dantley (Shadle kick) 28-28
- 7:28 AKR Jones 21-yard pass from Jacquemain (Iveljic kick) 35-28 Akron
- 2:43 AKR Poindexter 18-yard pass from Jacquemain (Iveljic kick) 42-28 Akron

=== Ball State ===
at the Rubber Bowl, Akron, Ohio

	1	2	3	4	Total
Ball State	7	10	14	10	41
Zips	3	7	0	14	24

Scoring Summary

1st Quarter

- 12:26 BSU Orsbon 21-yard pass from Davis (McGarvey kick) 7-0 BSU
- 10:50 AKR Iveljic 34-yard field goal 7-3 BSU

2nd Quarter

- 13:32 BSU McGarvey 31-yard field goal 10-3 BSU
- 10:18 AKR Allen 5-yard run (Iveljic kick) 10-10
- 1:11 BSU Lewis 3-yard run (McGarvey kick) 17-10 BSU

3rd Quarter

- 9:26 BSU Baker 33-yard fumble recovery (McGarvey kick) 24-10 BSU
- 5:16 BSU Lewis 2-yard run (McGarvey kick) 31-10 BSU

4th Quarter

- 13:06 AKR Johnson 26-yard run (Iveljic kick) 31-17 BSU
- 10:17 BSU Hill 25-yard pass from Davis (McGarvey kick) 38-17 BSU
- 8:27 AKR Jones 13-yard pass from Jacquemain (Iveljic kick) 38-24 BSU
- 3:04 BSU McGarvey 32-yard field goal 41-24 BSU

=== Army ===
at Michie Stadium, West Point, New York

	1	2	3	4	Total
Zips	3	6	3	10	22
Black Knights	0	3	0	0	3

Scoring Summary

1st Quarter

- 7:21 AKR Iveljic 25-yard field goal 3-0 AKR

2nd Quarter

- 6:14 AKR Jones 25-yard pass from Jacquemain (Iveljic kick failed) 9-0 AKR
- 0:00 ARMY Campbell 36-yard field goal 9-3 AKR

3rd Quarter

- 8:22 AKR Iveljic 36-yard field goal 12-3 AKR

4th Quarter

- 8:22 AKR Kennedy 1-yard run (Iveljic kick) 19-3 AKR
- 4:02 AKR Iveljic 37-yard field goal 22-3 AKR

=== Cincinnati ===
at the Rubber Bowl, Akron, Ohio

	1	2	3	4	Total
Bearcats	7	0	7	3	17
Zips	3	6	0	6	15

Scoring Summary

1st Quarter

- 10：47 CIN Gilyard 14-yard pass from Pike (Rogers kick) 7-0 CIN
- 4:02 AKR Iveljic 26-yard field goal 7-3 CIN

2nd Quarter

- 0:09 AKR Bowser 7-yard pass from Jacquemain (Iveljic kick blocked) 9-7 AKR

3rd Quarter

- 13:05 CIN Gilyard 67-yard pass from Pike (Rogers kick) 14-9 CIN

4th Quarter

- 14:13 AKR Kennedy 1-yard run (2PAT failed) 15-14 AKR
- 7:45 CIN Rogers 48-yard field goal 17-15 CIN

=== Kent State ===
at Dix Stadium, Kent, Ohio

	1	2	3	4	OT	2OT	Total
Zips	10	0	7	7	3	3	30
Golden Flashes	7	14	0	3	3	0	27

Scoring Summary

1st Quarter

- 13:09 AKR Jones 29-yard pass from Jacquemain (Iveljic kick) 7-0 AKR
- 3:53 KENT Thompson 1-yard pass from Edelman (Reed kick) 7-7
- 0:06 AKR Iveljic 33-yard field goal 10-7 AKR

2nd Quarter

- 10:55 KENT Bayes 14-yard pass from Edelman (Reed kick) 14-10 KENT
- 3:06 KENT Terry 1-yard run (Reed kick) 21-10 KENT

3rd Quarter

- 8:45 AKR Kennedy 1-yard run (Iveljic kick) 21-17 KENT

4th Quarter

- 1:28 AKR Bowser 24-yard pass from Jacquemain (Iveljic kick) 24-21 AKR
- 0:00 KENT Reed 32-yard field goal 24-24

Overtime

- OT KENT Reed 34-yard field goal 27-24 KENT
- OT AKR Iveljic 32-yard field goal 27-27
- 2OT AKR Iveljic 25-yard field goal 30-27 AKR

=== Bowling Green ===
at the Rubber Bowl, Akron, Ohio

	1	2	3	4	Total
Falcons	0	14	0	23	37
Zips	7	14	6	6	33

Scoring Summary

1st Quarter

- 1:05 AKR Kennedy 3-yard run (Iveljic kick) 7-0 AKR

2nd Quarter

- 5:54 AKR Bowser 37-yard pass from Jacquemain (Iveljic kick) 14-0 AKR
- 3:50 BGSU Parks 34-yard pass from Sheehan (Vrvilo kick) 14-7 AKR
- 2:58 AKR Kennedy 19-yard run (Iveljic kick) 21-7 AKR
- 0:42 BGSU Partridge 8-yard pass from Sheehan (Vrvilo kick) 21-14 AKR

3rd Quarter

- 10:06 AKR Iveljic 47-yard field goal 24-14 AKR
- 5:00 AKR Iveljic 26-yard field goal 27-14 AKR

4th Quarter

- 13:04 Sheehan 19-yard run (Vrvilo kick) 27-21 AKR
- 11:38 BGSU Sheidler 5-yard pass from Anthony Turner (Vrvilo kick) 28-27 BGSU
- 7:47 AKR Poindexter 13-yard pass from Jacquemain (2PAT failed) 33-28 AKR
- 4:52 BGSU Partridge 21-yard pass from Sheehan (2PAT failed) 34-33 BGSU
- 2:20 Vrvilo 44-yard field goal 37-33 BGSU

=== Eastern Michigan ===
at Rynearson Stadium, Ypsilanti, Michigan

	1	2	3	4	Total
Zips	3	21	7	11	42
Eagles	0	14	7	14	35

Scoring Summary

1st Quarter

- 12:08 AKR Iveljic 26-yard field goal 3-0 AKR

2nd Quarter

- 12:16 AKR Jones 16-yard pass from Jacquemain (Iveljic kick) 10-0 AKR
- 9:29 EMU Blevins 3-yard run (Carithers kick) 10-7 AKR
- 9:21 AKR Jones 45-yard pass from Jacquemain (Iveljic kick) 17-7 AKR
- 4:17 EMU Jones 5-yard pass from Schmitt (Carithers kick) 17-14 AKR
- 2:51 AKR Kennedy 33-yard run (Iveljic kick) 24-14 AKR

3rd Quarter

- 9:06 EMU Blevins 1-yard run (Carithers kick) 24-21 AKR
- 7:42 AKR Kennedy 10-yard run (Iveljic kick) 31-21 AKR

4th Quarter

- 14:10 AKR Iveljic 27-yard field goal 34-21 AKR
- 5:31 EMU Sanders 19-yard pass from Schmitt (Carithers kick) 34-28 AKR
- 3:49 EMU Leduc 6-yard pass from Schmitt (Carithers kick) 35-34 EMU
- 0:14 AKR Kennedy 4-yard run (Kennedy rush) AKR 42-35

=== Toledo ===
at the Rubber Bowl, Akron, Ohio

	1	2	3	4	Total
Rockets	3	7	13	7	30
Zips	21	3	9	14	47

Scoring Summary

1st Quarter

- 11:39 AKR Bruce 23-yard pass from Jacquemain (Iveljic kick) 7-0 AKR
- 9:58 AKR A. Williams blocked punt return (Iveljic kick) 14-0 AKR
- 4:22 AKR Poindexter 19-yard pass from Jacquemain (Iveljic kick) 21-0 AKR
- 0:04 TOL Steigerwald 28-yard field goal 21-3 AKR

2nd Quarter

- 5:11 TOL Opelt 6-yard run (Steigerwald kick) 21-10 AKR
- 0:02 AKR Iveljic 23-yard field goal 24-10 AKR

3rd Quarter

- 12:19 TOL Stafford 22-yard pass from Opelt (Steigerwald kick blocked) 24-16 AKR
- 12:19 AKR Lemon PAT return 26-16 AKR
- 6:29 TOL Williams 8-yard pass from Opelt (Steigerwald kick) AKR 26-23
- 3:04 AKR Miller 9-yard pass from Jacquemain (Iveljic kick) 33-23 AKR

4th Quarter

- 12:51 AKR Kennedy 2-yard run (Iveljic kick) 40-23 AKR
- 8:01 AKR A. Johnson 33-yard run (Iveljic kick) 47-23 AKR
- 5:01 TOL Williams 16-yard pass from Opelt (Steigerwald kick) 47-30 AKR

=== Buffalo ===
at the Rubber Bowl, Akron, Ohio

	1	2	3	4	OT	2OT	3OT	4OT	Total
Bulls	10	7	0	7	7	3	6	3	43
Zips	7	3	7	7	7	3	6	0	40

Scoring Summary

1st Quarter

- 9:36 UB Roosevelt 24-yard pass from Willy (Principe kick) 7-0 UB
- 5:08 UB Principe 28-yard field goal 10-0 UB
- 4:53 AKR Kennedy 57-yard pass from Jacquemain (Iveljic kick) 10-7 UB

2nd Quarter

- 4:48 UB Starks 3-yard run (Principe kick) 17-7 UB
- 0:08 AKR Iveljic 49-yard field goal 17-10 UB

3rd Quarter

- 11:14 AKR Kennedy 24-yard run (Iveljic kick) 17-17

4th Quarter

- 11:14 UB Starks 5-yard run (Principe kick) 24-17 UB
- 0:23 Kennedy 1-yard run (Iveljic kick) 24-24

Overtime

- OT UB Willy 1-yard run (Principe kick) 31-24 UB
- OT AKR Miller 4-yard pass from Jacquemain (Iveljic kick) 31-31
- 2OT AKR Iveljic 42-yard field goal 34-31 AKR
- 2OT UB Principe 24-yard field goal 34-34
- 3OT UB Starks 1-yard run (2PAT failed) 40-34 UB
- 3OT AKR Kennedy 1-yard run (2PAT failed) 40-40
- 4OT UB Principe 40-yard field goal 43-40 UB

=== Ohio ===
at Peden Stadium, Athens, Ohio

	1	2	3	4	Total
Zips	7	14	0	21	42
Bobcats	7	21	7	14	49

Scoring Summary

1st Quarter

- 8:01 AKR Kennedy 3-yard run (Iveljic kick 7-0 AKR
- 2:49 OHIO Brazill 66-yard punt return (Way kick) 7-7

2nd Quarter

- 11:19 OHIO Price 4-yard pass from Jackson (Way kick) 14-7 OHIO
- 6:42 AKR Jacquemain 9-yard run (Iveljic kick) 14-14
- 2:45 OHIO Carter 23-yard pass from Jackson (Way kick) 21-14 Ohio
- 1:18 AKR Bowser 60-yard pass from Jacquemain (Iveljic kick) 21-21
- 1:01 OHIO Price 19-yard pass from Jackson (Way kick) 28-21 OHIO

3rd Quarter

- 9:01 OHIO Price 25-yard pass from Jackson (Way kick) 35-21 OHIO

4th Quarter

- 14:57 AKR Kennedy 1-yard run (Iveljic kick) 35-28 OHIO
- 14:42 OHIO Garrett 97-yard kickoff return (Way kick) 42-28 OHIO
- 8:08 AKR Kennedy 2-yard run (Iveljic kick) 42-35 OHIO
- 2:12 AKR Kennedy 1-yard run (Iveljic kick) 42-42
- 0:32 Carter 1-yard pass from Jackson (Way kick) 49-42 OHIO

=== Temple ===
at Lincoln Financial Field, Philadelphia, Pennsylvania

	1	2	3	4	Total
Zips	0	0	3	3	6
Owls	0	6	0	21	27

Scoring Summary

2nd Quarter

- 9:08 TEM DiMichele 4-yard run (Brownell kick failed 6-0 TEM

3rd Quarter

- 2:18 AKR Iveljic 24-yard field goal 6-3 TEM

4th Quarter

- 10:15 AKR Iveljic 18-yard field goal 6-6
- 7:49 TEM DiMichelle 4-yard run (Brownell kick) 13-6 TEM
- 4:02 TEM Grigsby 3-yard run (Brownell kick) 20-6 TEM
- 2:29 TEM Grigsby 9-yard run (Brownell kick) 27-6

== Roster ==
(final roster)
Quarterback: 2 Jared Wackerly - Freshman; 5 Matt Ridgers - Freshman; 11 Chris Jacquemain - Junior; 16 Jordan Miller - Freshman; Wide Receiver: 1 Deryn Bowser - Junior; 6 Curtis Brown - Freshman; 9 Gary Pride II - Freshman; 12 Jeremy Bruce - Junior; 17 Brandon Williams - Senior; 21 Andre Jones - Senior; 80 Nadir Brown - Freshman; 81 Alphonso Owen - Senior; 81 Roberts Shawn - Sophomore; 82 Troy Eison - Sophomore; 85 Nathan Cope - Sophomore; 87 Richard Sandilands - Sophomore; 88 Dashan Miller - Junior; Offensive Lineman: 51 Elliott Bates - Junior; 53 Dan Ronsman - Freshman; 61 Mitch Straight - Freshman; 63 Joe Pachuta - Freshman; 65 Adam Bice - Freshman; 66 Sean McCarthy - Freshman; 68 Andrew Colosimo - Freshman; 69 Casey Estrada - Junior; 70 Paul Simkovich - Freshman; 71 Mike Ward - Sophomore; 72 Zac Kasparek - Freshman; 73 Jake Anderson - Freshman; 74 Chris Kemme - Senior; 75 Corey Woods - Sophomore; 78 Zack Anderson - Junior; 79 Jason Sekinger - Sophomore	Fullback Running Back: 3 Dennis Kennedy - Senior; 4 DeVoe Torrence - Freshman; 7 Andrew Johnson - Senior; 10 Alex Allen - Junior; 13 Samuel Bullock II- "Sophomore"; 14 Thomas Miller - Freshman; 15 Nate Burney - Sophomore; 31 Michael Reimer - Freshman; 32 Joe Tuzze - Junior; 39 Dale Martin - Freshman; 42 Matt Harmon - Junior; Tight End: 8 Jose Cruz - Sophomore; 15 Brian Flaherty - Senior; 83 Merce Poindexter - Senior; 84 Rhyne Ladrach - Freshman	Defensive Lineman: 13 Shane Shead - Freshman; 45 Joe Rash - Freshman; 52 Marquinn Davis - Freshman; 56 Almondo Sewell - Sophomore; 60 Dan Marcoux - Freshman; 67 Deni Odofin - Sophomore; 76 Ryan Gibbons - Junior; 90 Blake Smith - Freshman; 92 Ryan Bain - Junior; 93 Eric Lively - Senior; 94 Shawn Lemon - Sophomore; 95 Chad Maynard - Freshman; 96 Hasan Hazime - Freshman; 97 James Harvey - Freshman; 98 Nick Legger - Senior; 99 Cowles Stewart - Freshman; Linebacker: 20 Mike Thomas - Sophomore; 22 Mitchell Magloire - Senior; 23 Sean Fobbs - Sophomore; 25 Aaron Williams - Freshman; 27 Steve Riley - Junior; 30 Kevin Grant - Senior; 31 Troy Gilmer - Freshman; 34 Brian Wagner - Freshman; 42 Michael Taggart - Senior; 44 Ray Siler - Senior; 47 Al-Teric Balaam - Junior; 49 Matt Little - Freshman; 50 Mike Polinski - Sophomore; 54 Doug Williams - Senior; 57 Nate Schuler - Freshman; 58 Brady Greenwood - Freshman; 82 Viktor Rajek - Sophomore	Defensive Back: 1 Brandon Anderson - Senior; 2 Jalil Carter - Sophomore; 6 Manley Waller - Freshman; 9 Doug Richardson - Sophomore; 11 Miguel Graham - Senior; 17 Norman Shuford - Freshman; 22 Jamie Milsom- Freshman; 24 Bryan Williams - Senior; 26 Kevin Davis - Junior; 27 Wayne Cobham - Junior; 28 Amin Kabir - Junior; 29 James Stewart - Junior; 30 Mark Markovich - Sophomore; 33 Josh Richmond - Freshman; 35 Bryant McMillon - Junior; 36 Jared Province - Freshman; 41 LeVon Morefield - Sophomore; 43 Larry Dawson - Freshman; 46 Marvase Byrd - Freshman; 48 Tyler Campbell - Sophomore; Long Snapper Punter: 8 Zack Campbell - Freshman; 16 Andy Hildreth - Senior; 38 John Stec - Junior; Place Kicker: 37 Branko Rogovic - Sophomore; 45 Igor Iveljic - Sophomore

== Coaching staff ==
- J.D. Brookhart - Head Coach
- Bill Bleil - Assistant Head Coach / Tackles & Tight Ends
- Joe Moorhead - Offensive Coordinator / Quarterbacks
- Jim Fleming - Defensive Coordinator / Secondary
- Brian Callahan - Offensive Line
- Dana Chambers - Defensive Line
- Mike Dawson - Linebackers
- Reno Ferri - Running Backs / Recruiting Coordinator
- Emmanuel McDaniel - Cornerbacks
- Mauro Monz - Wide Receivers

== Statistics ==
=== Team ===
	Team	Opp
Scoring	360	375
Points per Game	30.0	31.2
First downs	256	270
Rushing	106	132
Passing	135	119
Penalty	14	18
Total offense	4760	4771
Avg per Play	5.7	5.5
Avg per Game	396.7	397.6
Fumbles-Lost	12-6	26-17
Penalties-Yards	66-558	50-451
Avg per Game	46.5	37.6

	Team	Opp
Punts-Yards	48-1782	45-1704
Avg per Punt	37.1	37.9
Time of possession/Game	28:48	31:12
3rd Down Conversions	65/160	72/160
4th Down Conversions	11/18	13/20
Touchdowns Scored	44	49
Field Goals-Attempts	18-28	12-19
PAT-Attempts	38-40	45-47
Attendance	71,709	199,697
Games/Avg per Game	5/14,342	7/28,528

==== Scores by quarter ====
	1	2	3	4	OT	Total
Akron	78	98	42	120	22	360
Opponents	55	113	69	116	22	375

=== Offense ===
==== Rushing ====
Name	GP	Att	Gain	Loss	Net	Avg	TD	Long	Avg/G
Dennis Kennedy	12	239	1363	42	1321	5.5	17	73	110.1
Andrew Johnson	10	56	288	10	278	5.0	2	33	27.8
Alex Allen	3	32	164	12	152	4.8	3	20	50.7
Joe Tuzze	11	14	68	1	67	4.8	0	13	6.1
Jeremy Bruce	12	18	68	15	53	2.9	0	12	4.4
Andre Jones	11	4	51	0	51	12.8	0	47	4.6
Chris Jacquemain	12	55	176	130	46	0.8	1	13	3.8
Dashan Miller	12	4	27	15	12	3.0	0	11	1.0
Gary Pride II	6	4	13	1	12	3.0	0	12	2.0
Matt Harmon	3	1	5	0	5	5.0	0	5	1.7
John Stec	12	1	4	0	4	4.0	0	4	0.3
Matt Rodgers	2	1	1	0	1	1.0	0	1	0.5
TEAM	8	6	0	20	-20	-3.3	0	0	-2.5
Total	12	435	2228	246	1982	4.6	23	73	165.2
Opponents	12	504	2467	221	2246	4.5	20	46	187.2

==== Passing ====
Name	GP	Effic	Att-Cmp-Int	Pct	Yds	TD	Lng	Avg/G
Chris Jacquemain	12	125.27	399-231-14	57.9	2748	20	60	229.0
Dennis Kennedy	12	117.33	3-1-0	33.3	30	0	30	2.5
TEAM	8	0.00	2-0-0	0.0	0	0	0	0
Total	12	124.59	404-232-14	57.4	2778	20	60	231.5
Opponents	12	142.11	356-226-9	63.5	2525	26	67	210.4

==== Receiving ====
Name	GP	No.	Yds	Avg	TD	Long	Avg/G
Deryn Bowser	12	64	785	12.3	4	60	65.4
Andre Jones	11	47	678	14.4	7	49	61.6
Dennis Kennedy	12	31	314	10.1	1	57	26.2
Jeremy Bruce	12	29	345	11.9	1	27	28.8
Dashan Miller	12	16	187	11.7	2	37	15.6
Alphonso Owen	12	15	173	11.5	1	34	14.4
Merce Poindexter	12	12	145	12.1	4	22	12.1
Andrew Johnson	10	11	64	5.8	0	20	6.4
Alex Allen	3	2	22	11.0	0	12	7.3
Joe Tuzze	11	1	8	8.0	0	8	0.7
Total	12	232	2778	12.0	20	60	231.5
Opponents	12	226	2525	11.2	26	67	210.4

=== Defense ===
Name	GP	Tackles				Sacks	Pass defense		Interceptions		Fumbles		Blkd Kick
Name	GP	Solo	Ast	Total	TFL-Yds	No-Yds	BrUp	QBH	No.-Yds	Avg	Rcv-Yds	FF	Blkd Kick
Kevin Grant	12	50	35	85	8.5-41	4.0-26	3	2	0	0	2-0	0	0
Mike Thomas	12	48	33	81	8.5-33	2.5-11	1	0	0	0	2-0	2	0
Miguel Graham	12	50	20	70	2.0-3	0	8	0	3-0	0	3-0	0	1
Doug Williams	12	38	31	69	4.5-8	0	1	0	2-45	22.5	0	0	0
Bryan Williams	12	39	25	64	7.0-20	0	3	0	1-62	62	1-16	2	0
Wayne Cobham	11	30	33	63	0.5-0	0	3	0	0	0	1-0	1	0
Tyler Campbell	12	34	29	63	0	0	1	0	0	0	1-0	1	0
Almondo Sewell	12	37	25	62	6.0-22	2.0-15	0	0	0	0	0	0	1
Jalil Carter	12	29	19	48	1.5-5	0.5-1	4	0	1-5	5	0	1	1
Aaron Williams	10	22	25	47	1.5-4	1.0-3	1	0	0	0	1-0	1	0
Brandon Anderson	11	27	15	42	1.0-1	0	10	0	1-1	1	0	0	0
Shawn Lemon	12	18	16	34	5.0-19	0	0	1	0	0	1-0	2	0
Al-Teric Balaam	11	12	9	21	2.0-5	0	0	0	0	0	0	1	0
Ray Siler	11	12	8	20	0	0	1	0	0	0	0	1	0
Eric Lively	8	11	9	20	3.0-4	1.0-1	1	0	0	0	0	0	1
Manley Wallar	12	14	4	18	1.0-4	0	1	0	1-9	9	0	0	0
Joe Rash	12	6	6	12	1.0-1	0	0	0	0	0	1-0	0	0
Amin Kabir	12	9	3	12	0	0	0	0	0	0	1-0	0	0
Dan Marcoux	9	7	4	11	1.0-1	0	0	0	0	0	0	1	0
Evan Laube	9	6	4	10	1.0-2	0	0	0	0	0	1-0	0	0
Sean Fobbs	8	9	1	10	0	0	0	1	0	0	0	0	0
Deni Odofin	7	3	5	8	1.0-3	0	0	0	0	0	0	0	0
Andre Jones	11	5	2	7	0	0	0	0	0	0	0	1	0
Merce Poindexter	12	3	1	4	0	0	0	0	0	0	0	0	0
James Harvey	11	3	0	3	0	0	0	0	0	0	0	0	0
Cowles Stewart	2	1	2	3	0	0	1	0	0	0	0	0	0
Hasan Hazime	4	3	0	3	0	0	0	0	0	0	0	0	0
Chris Kemme	12	2	0	2	0	0	0	0	0	0	0	0	0
Chris Jacquemain	12	2	0	2	0	0	0	0	0	0	0	0	0
Joe Tuzze	11	0	2	2	0	0	0	0	0	0	0	0	0
Alphonso Owen	12	1	1	2	0	0	0	0	0	0	0	0	0
Dennis Kennedy	12	1	1	2	0	0	0	0	0	0	0	0	0
Corey Woods	12	0	1	1	0	0	0	0	0	0	0	0	0
Igor Iveljic	12	1	0	1	0	0	0	0	0	0	0	0	0
Elliott Bates	12	1	0	1	0	0	0	0	0	0	0	0	0
Matt Little	2	1	0	1	0	0	0	0	0	0	0	0	0
Jeremy Bruce	12	1	0	1	0	0	0	0	0	0	0	0	0
Jose Cruz	12	0	1	1	0	0	0	0	0	0	0	0	0
Brian Flaherty	12	0	0	0	0	0	0	0	0	0	1-0	0	0
TEAM	8	1	0	1	1.0-7	0	0	0	0	0	1-0	1	0
Total	12	537	370	907	57-183	11-57	39	4	9-122	13.5	17-16	15	4
Opponents	12	490	358	848	56-207	17-106	45	6	14-129	9.2	6-48	6	3

=== Special teams ===
Name	Punting								Kickoffs				
Name	No.	Yds	Avg	Long	TB	FC	I20	Blkd	No.	Yds	Avg	TB	OB
John Stec	48	1782	37.1	49	3	20	12	0	0	0	0	0	0
Branko Rogovic	0	0	0	0	0	0	0	0	57	3364	59.0	4	2
Igor Iveljic	0	0	0	0	0	0	0	0	12	661	55.1	0	0
Total	48	1782	37.1	49	3	20	12	0	69	4025	58.3	4	2
Opponents	45	1704	37.9	58	4	12	15	1	65	3670	56.5	2	0

Name	Punt returns					Kick returns				
Name	No.	Yds	Avg	TD	Long	No.	Yds	Avg	TD	Long
Andre Jones	7	46	6.6	0	14	6	128	21.3	0	31
Gary Pride	2	21	10.5	0	15	0	0	0.0	0	0
Jeremy Bruce	2	10	5.0	0	17	7	79	11.3	0	18
Jalil Carter	1	23	23.0	0	0	3	55	18.3	0	29
Aaron Williams	0	0	0.0	1	0	0	0	0.0	0	0
Bryan Williams	0	0	0.0	0	0	21	609	29.0	0	50
Dashan Miller	0	0	0.0	0	0	13	316	24.3	0	46
Andrew Johnson	0	0	0.0	0	0	5	96	19.2	0	28
Joe Tuzze	0	0	0.0	0	0	3	37	12.3	0	15
Mike Thomas	0	0	0.0	0	0	1	14	14.0	0	14
Brandon Anderson	0	0	0.0	0	0	1	17	17.0	0	17
Doug Williams	0	0	0.0	0	0	1	4	4.0	0	4
Total	12	100	8.3	1	15	63	1368	21.7	0	50
Opponents	16	147	9.2	1	66	62	1376	22.2	1	97
