= Konstantyn Józef Zieliński =

Polish archbishop

His Excellency Konstanty Józef Zieliński
- Archbishop Emeritus of Gniezno; Primate Emeritus of Poland
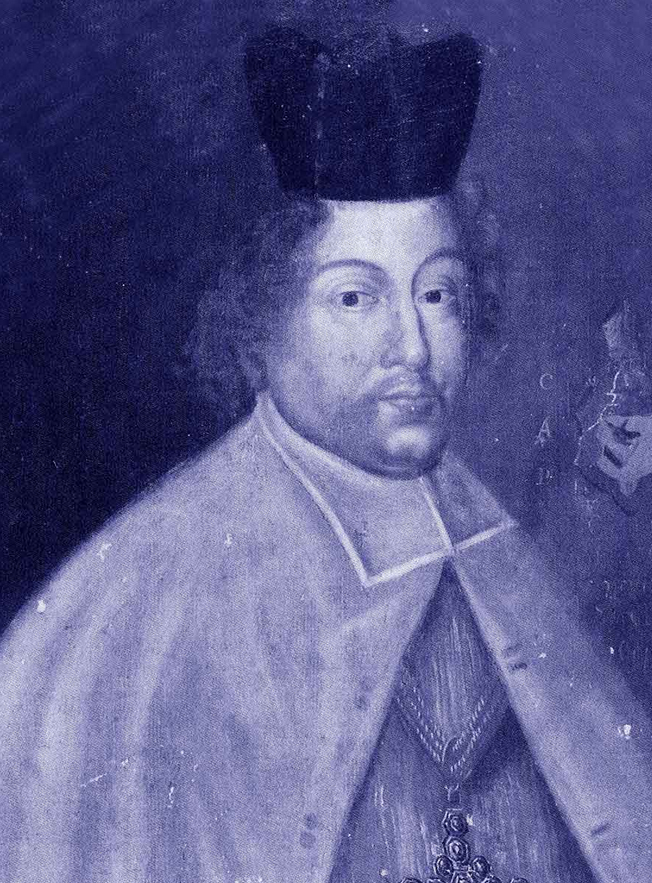
- Church: Roman Catholic

Orders
- Consecration: 1694

Personal details
- Born: 1646 Rostkowo
- Died: 17 February 1709 (aged 62–63) Moscow

Konstanty Józef Zieliński (born in 1646 in Rostkowo; died on 17 February 1709 in Moscow) was a Polish Roman Catholic priest, auxiliary bishop of Gniezno in the years 1694–1700, metropolitan archbishop of Lviv in the years 1700–1709.

He was born in January 1646. The exact date, however, is unknown. He came from a wealthy noble family from northern Mazovia, using the Świnka coat of arms. His family owned numerous lands in the Dobrzyń region and in Płock Province. He was the son of the castellan of Sierpc, Ludwik Zieliński (1619–1678) and his first wife, Helena née Zawadzka (1626–1648). He studied in Kraków, Ingolstadt, Paris and Rome. He obtained a doctorate in theology. He was ordained a priest in 1671.
