= SJJ =

SJJ may refer to:

- St. John's Jesuit High School and Academy, Toledo, Ohio
- Sarajevo International Airport, IATA code: SJJ
