= Kuzhur =

- Village
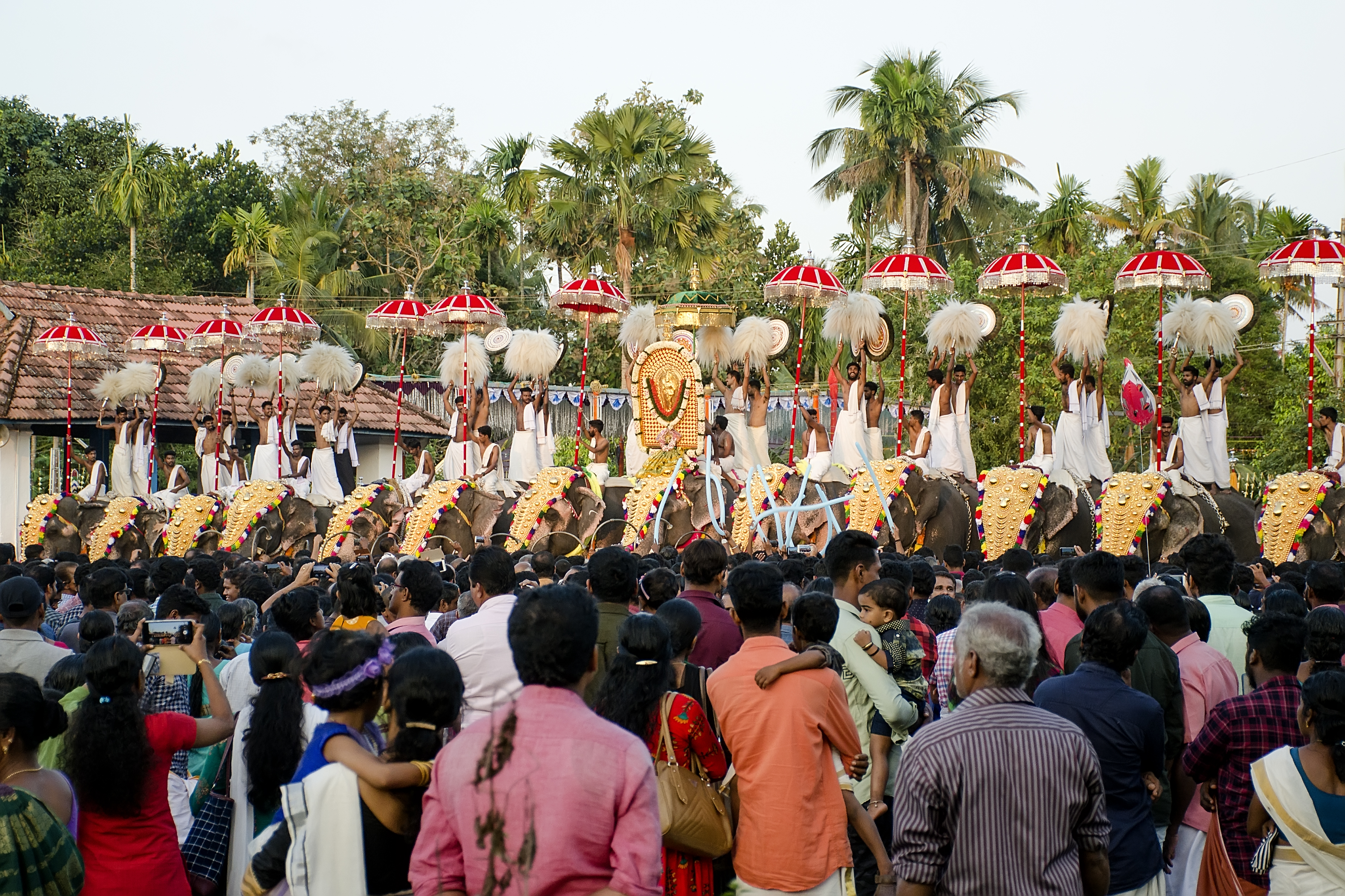
- Caparisoned elephants during Kuzhur Sree Subramanya Swami Temple festival
- Interactive map of Kuzhur
- Coordinates: 10°12′0″N 76°16′0″E
- Country: India
- State: Kerala
- District: Thrissur
- Block Panchayat: Mala, Kerala

Languages
  - Official: Malayalam, English
- Time zone: UTC+5:30 (IST)
- PIN: 680734
- Vehicle registration: KL-64 Chalakudy
- Website: Kuzhur Panchayath

Kuzhur is a small village in the southern end of Thrissur district of the Indian state of Kerala. The old Jewish settlement of Mala is the nearest town.

Other nearby towns include Chalakudy, Kodungallur, Angamaly and Irinjalakuda.

== Description ==
Kuzhur is set amid cultivated paddy fields. The Chalakkudy River flows on the southern end of Kuzhur.

Kuzhur is a village located in the Chalakudy Taluk of Thrissur District, Kerala, India. It comprises the villages of Thirumukkulam and Kakkulissery. The village is known for its inter religious culture including Hindus, Christians and Muslims.

Many temples & Churches are located in this village.

The Kuzhur Sri Subrahmanya Swami Temple, a significant pilgrimage center for Hindu devotees. Managed by the Cochin Devaswom Board, the temple is noted for its architectural splendor and the idol of Lord Sri Subrahmanya, which stands over six feet tall.

St. Xaviers Church, located in South Thanissery തെക്കൻ താണിശ്ശേരി പളളി(known as before Vallattukunnu) is very famous historical Christian Church in this region for 2 centuries. The Feast of St Francis Xavier is celebrated in this Church every year on second Sunday after Easter Sunday. Other Christian Churches like St. Mary's Church, St. Joseph Church, St. Sebastian Church etc. are located in this village.

Another notable temple near Kuzhur is the Iranikulam Siva Temple, situated approximately 2 km away. This historic site is associated with the medieval Malayalam poet Tholan, who is believed to have lived in or visited Iranikulam.

Kuzhur is famous for many cultural & religious events like Athirathram (historical pooja for rain).

Many artistists are from Kuzhur like famous chenda (traditional drum) vidhwan Sri.Kuttan Marar is from Kuzhur.

== Education ==
- Govt. HS, Kuzhur
- Govt. HSS, Iranikulam
- St. Antony's Girls HS, South Thanissery
- St. Xavier's LPS, South Thanissery
- Govt. UPS, Kundur
- St. Joseph of Tarbes School, Kundoor
- SKV LPS, Eravathur

== Culture ==
The eight-day-long Pooram (Utsavam), is held annually in the village. Ritual drum performances, known as "chendamelams", and panchavadhyam are performed on the festive days, and there is a procession of 15 elephants.

The Temple celebrates Utsavam for 8 days in Vruschikam. Kuzhur Ekadasi is the most important day of Utsavam (Valiya Vilakku). Several programs are conducted during these days in Kuzhur. Other noted festivals include Thula Shashti in Thulam and Thaipooyam in Makaram.

Kuzhur Mary Immaculate Church, a Christian Church, is located further south of the main junction. The Church conducts perunnal feasts annually for the local believers.

== Sports ==
Kuzhur has a Panchayat stadium.

== Image gallery ==
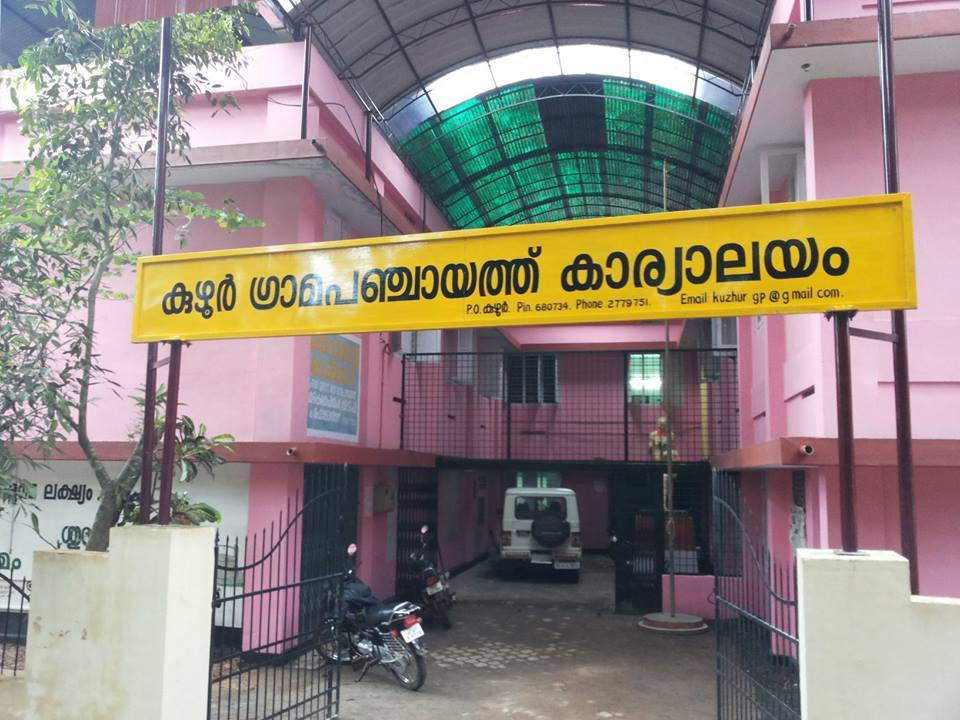
Kuzhur Panchayath office

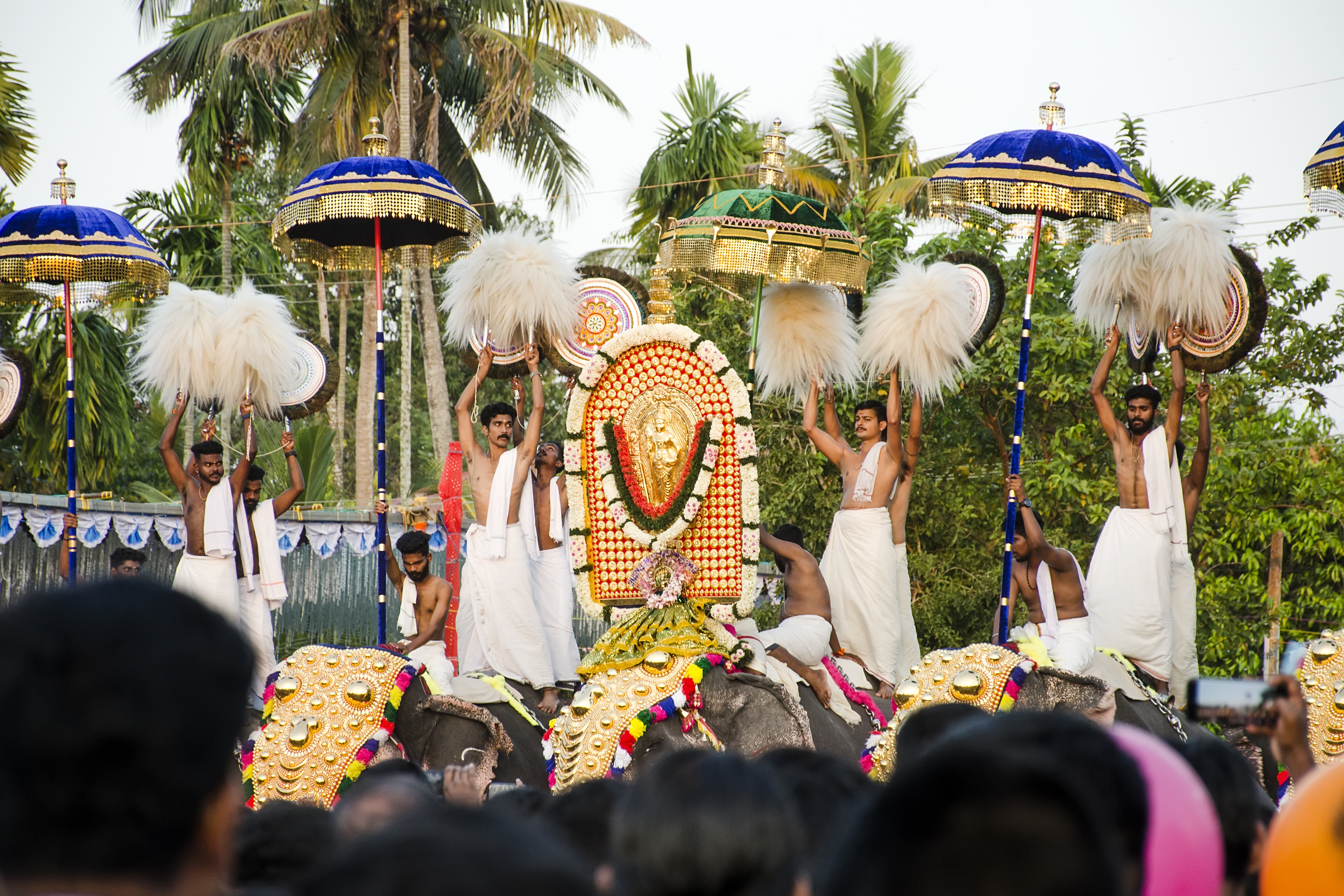
Pooram at Kuzhur Sree Subramanya Swami Temple

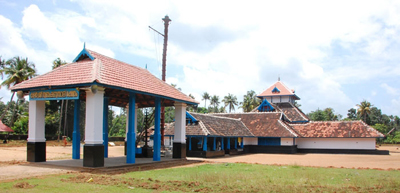
Sree Subramanya Swami Temple, Kuzhur

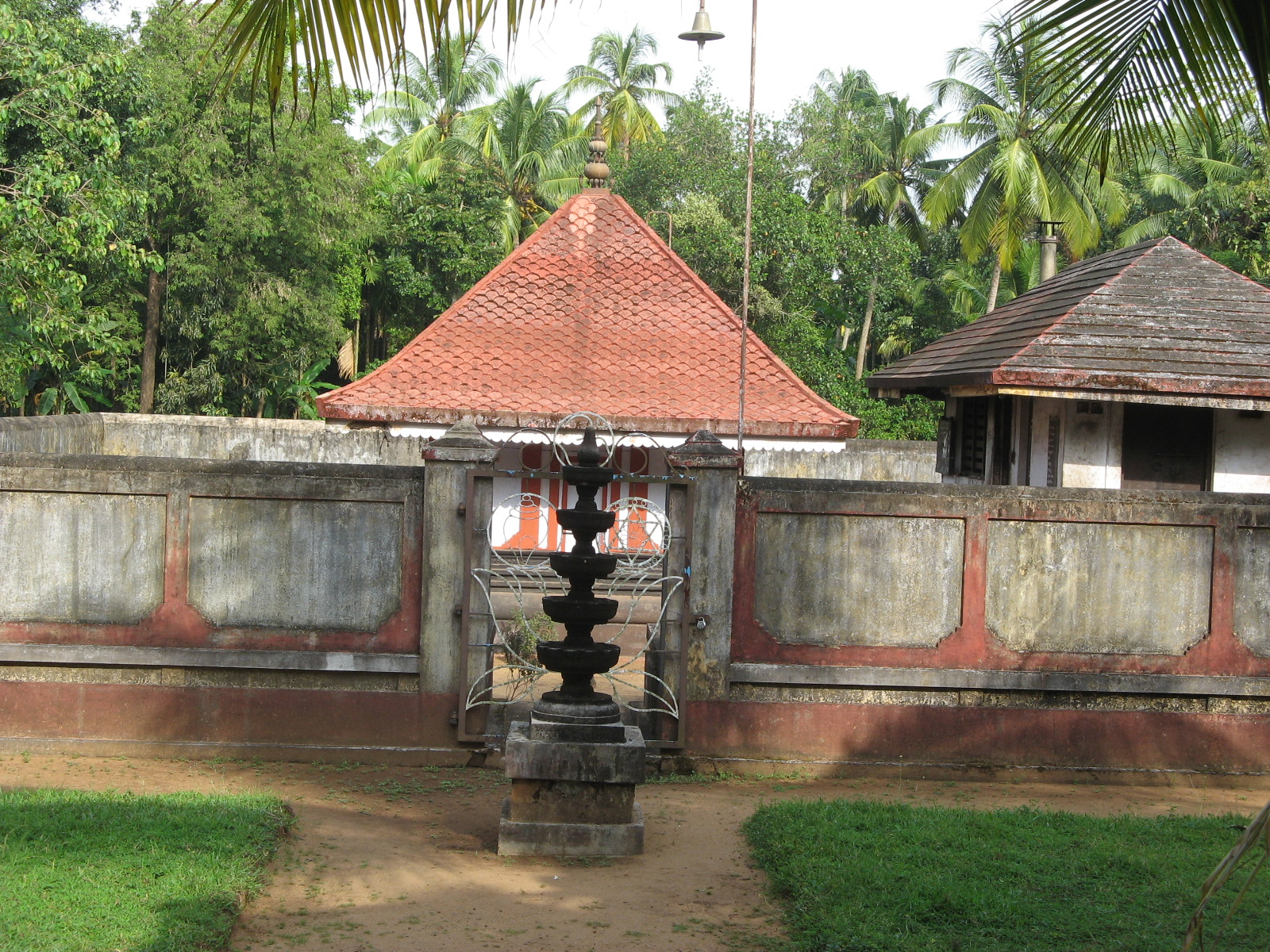
Narayanan Kulangara Temple

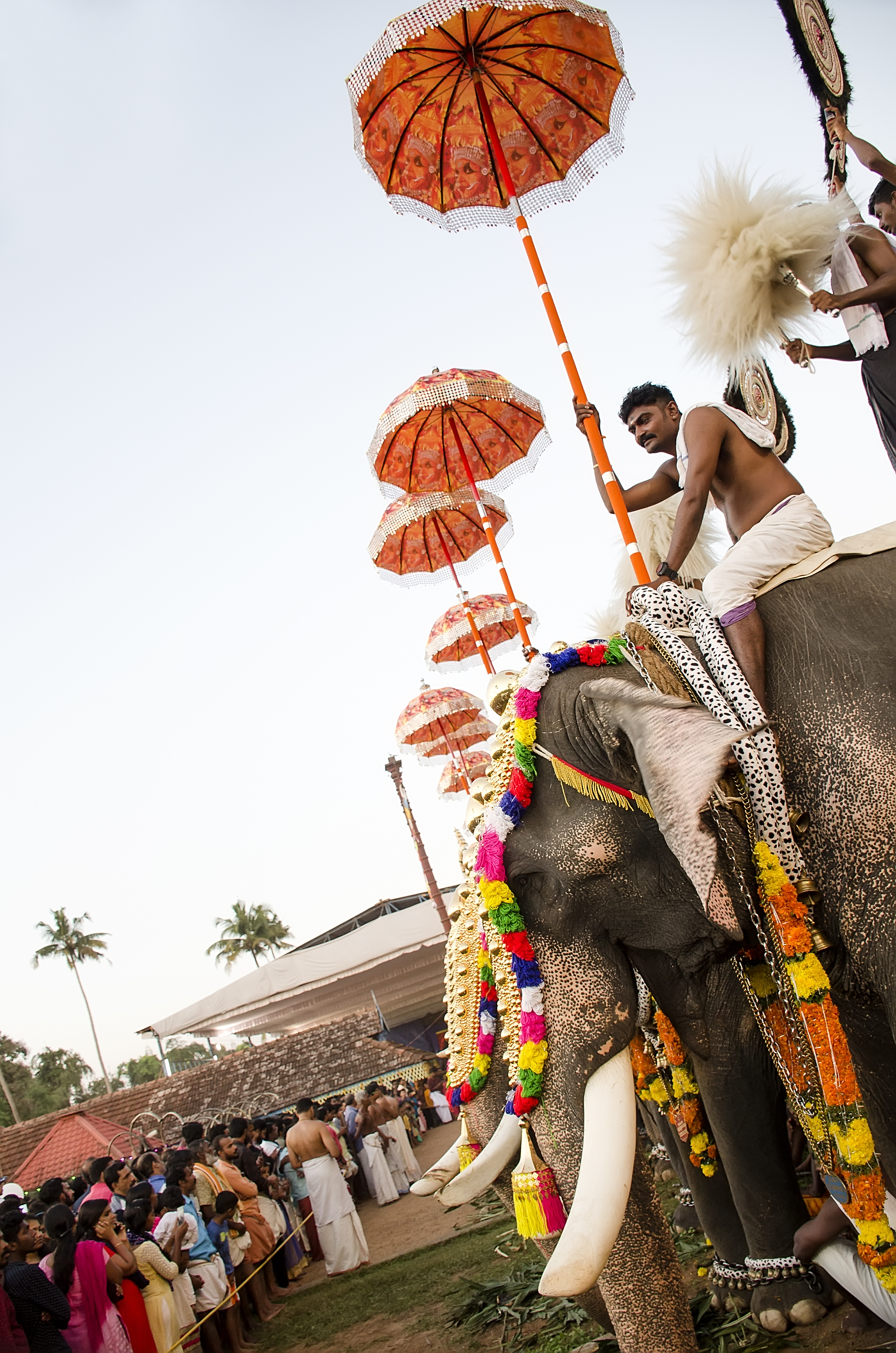
Kuda Mattam during pooram at Kuzhur Sree Subramanya Swami Temple

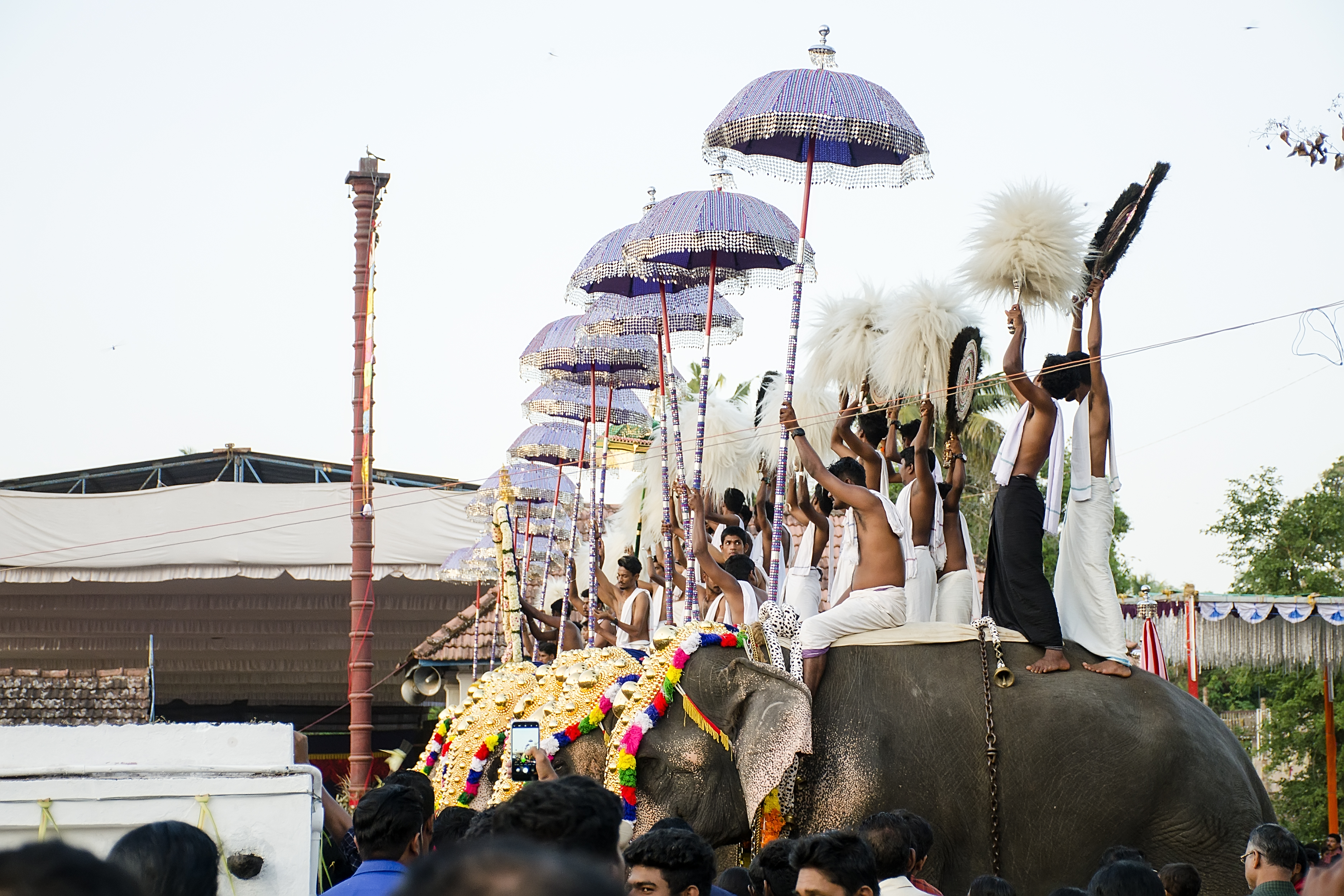
Kudamattam during Pooram - Kuzhur Sree Subramanya Swami Temple
