= Kakkulissery =

- village
- Location in Kerala, India Kakkulissery (India)
- Coordinates: 10°13′0″N 76°17′0″E
- Country: India
- State: Kerala
- District: Thrissur
- Gram panchayat: Kuzhur
- Block Panchayat: Mala, Kerala
- Talukas: Chalakudy

Government
  - Type: Panchayati raj (India)
  - Body: Gram panchayat

Languages
  - Official: Malayalam, English
- Time zone: UTC+5:30 (IST)
- PIN: 680734
- Vehicle registration: KL-64

Kakkulissery is a small village in the southern end of Thrissur district in Chalakkudy taluka of Kerala, India. The language spoken by the majority of people in this area is Malayalam.

Mala, Chalakudy, Kodungallur, Irinjalakuda, Angamaly, Aluva is nearest towns to Kakkulissery for all major economic activities, which is approximately 18 km away.Cochin International Airport is the nearest airport, 19 km away.
