= Stanislaus Kostka =

Polish Jesuit and saint (1550–1568)

Saint Stanislaus Kostka SJ
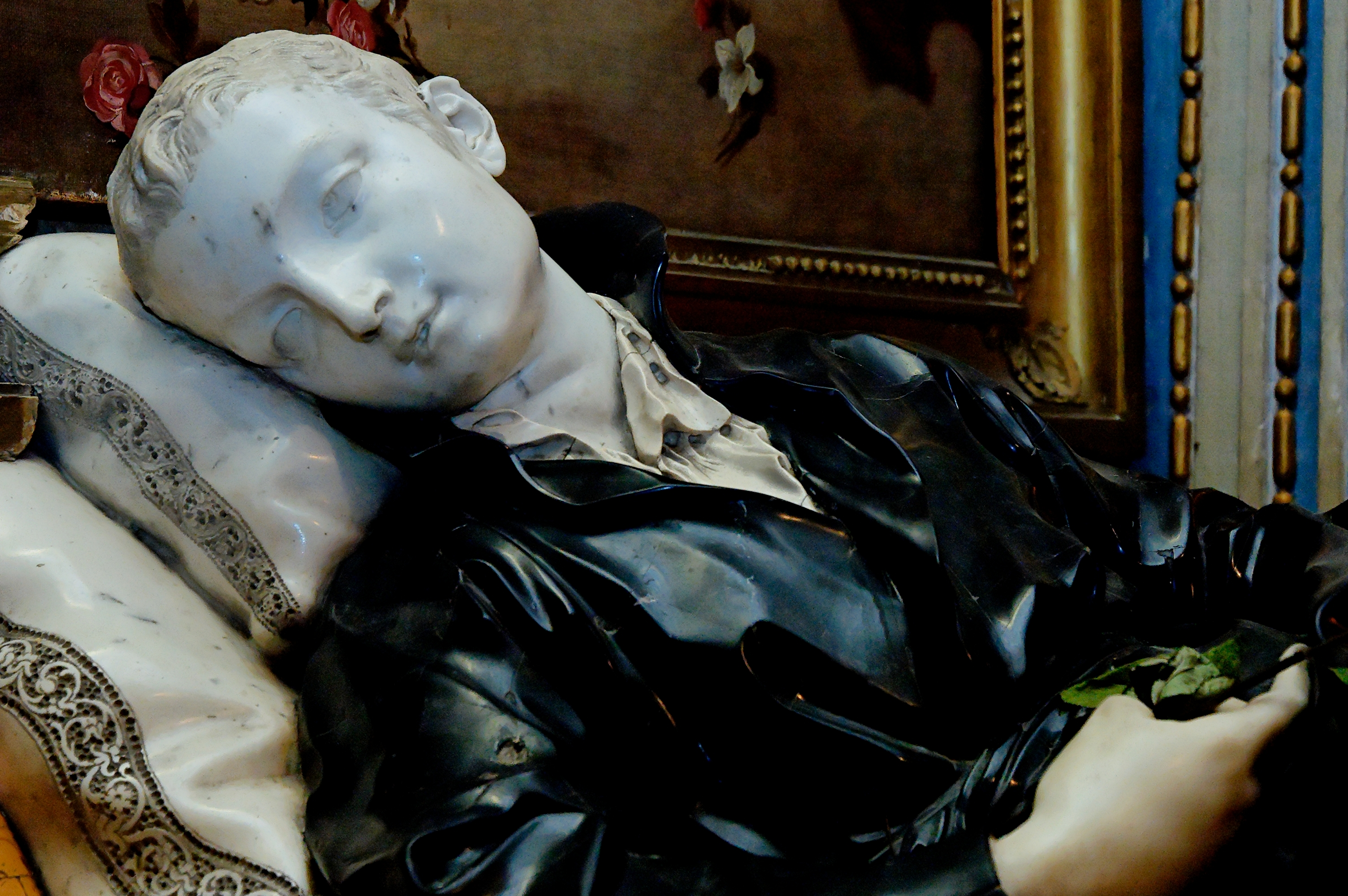
- Born: 28 October 1550; Rostkowo, Poland
- Died: 15 August 1568 (aged 17); Rome, Papal States
- Venerated in: Catholic Church
- Beatified: 8 October 1605, Saint Peter's Basilica, Papal States by Pope Paul V
- Canonized: 31 December 1726, Saint Peter's Basilica, Papal States by Pope Benedict XIII
- Major shrine: Rome
- Feast: 13 November
- Attributes: Lily, Jesuit habit, Jesus, Most Blessed Sacrament

Stanisław Kostka, SJ (28 October 1550 – 15 August 1568) was a Polish novice in the Society of Jesus. He was born at Rostkowo, Przasnysz County, Poland, on 28 October 1550, and died in Rome during the night of 14–15 August 1568. He is said to have foretold his death a few days before it occurred. He was canonized in 1726.

== Biography ==
=== Family ===
His father was a senator of the Kingdom of Poland and castellan of Zakroczym; his mother was Małgorzata Kryska from Drobni (Margaret de Drobniy Kryska), the sister and niece of the voivodes of Masovia and the aunt of the celebrated Chancellor of Poland, Feliks Kryski (Felix Kryski, Szczęsny Kryski). He was the second of seven children. His older brother Paweł (Paul) survived to be present at the beatification ceremony of Stanislaus in 1605.

=== School life ===
On 25 July 1564, they arrived at Vienna with their tutor to attend the Jesuit college that had been opened four years before. Stanislaus was soon conspicuous among his classmates during his three years of schooling, not only for his amiability and cheerfulness of expression, but also for his growing religious fervour and piety. His brother Paul said during the process of beatification that "He devoted himself so completely to spiritual things that he frequently became unconscious, especially in the church of the Jesuit Fathers at Vienna." One of the practices of devotion which he joined while at Vienna was the Congregation of St. Barbara and Our Lady, "of which he, with numbers of the pupils of the Society of Jesus" also belonged. Stanislaus alleged to a fellow-member of the Society at Rome that Saint Barbara brought two angels to him during the course of a serious illness, in order to give him the Eucharist. His tutor, John Bilinski, witnessed the miracle, and though he himself did not see what Stanislaus claimed to see, he "was certain that Stanislaus was not at all out of his mind through the violence of his sickness".

Exasperated by his younger brother's piety, Paweł (Paul) began to mistreat Stanislaus. Stanislaus suffered the unjust treatment with remarkable stoicism and patience, but "one night after Stanislaus had again suffered the harsh comments and blows of his brother, he turned on Paul with the words: 'Your rough treatment will end in my going away never to return, and you will have to explain my leaving to our father and mother.' Paul's sole reply was to swear violently at him."

=== Entry into the Society of Jesus ===
The thought of joining the Society of Jesus had already entered the mind of the saintly young man. It was six months, however, before he ventured to speak of this to the superiors of the Society. At Vienna they hesitated to receive him, fearing the tempest that would probably be raised by his father against the Society, which had just quieted a storm unleashed by other admissions to the Company. Another Jesuit suggested he go to Augsburg, Germany where Peter Canisius was provincial. The distance was over four hundred miles, which had to be made on foot, without equipment or guide or any other resources but that did not deter him.

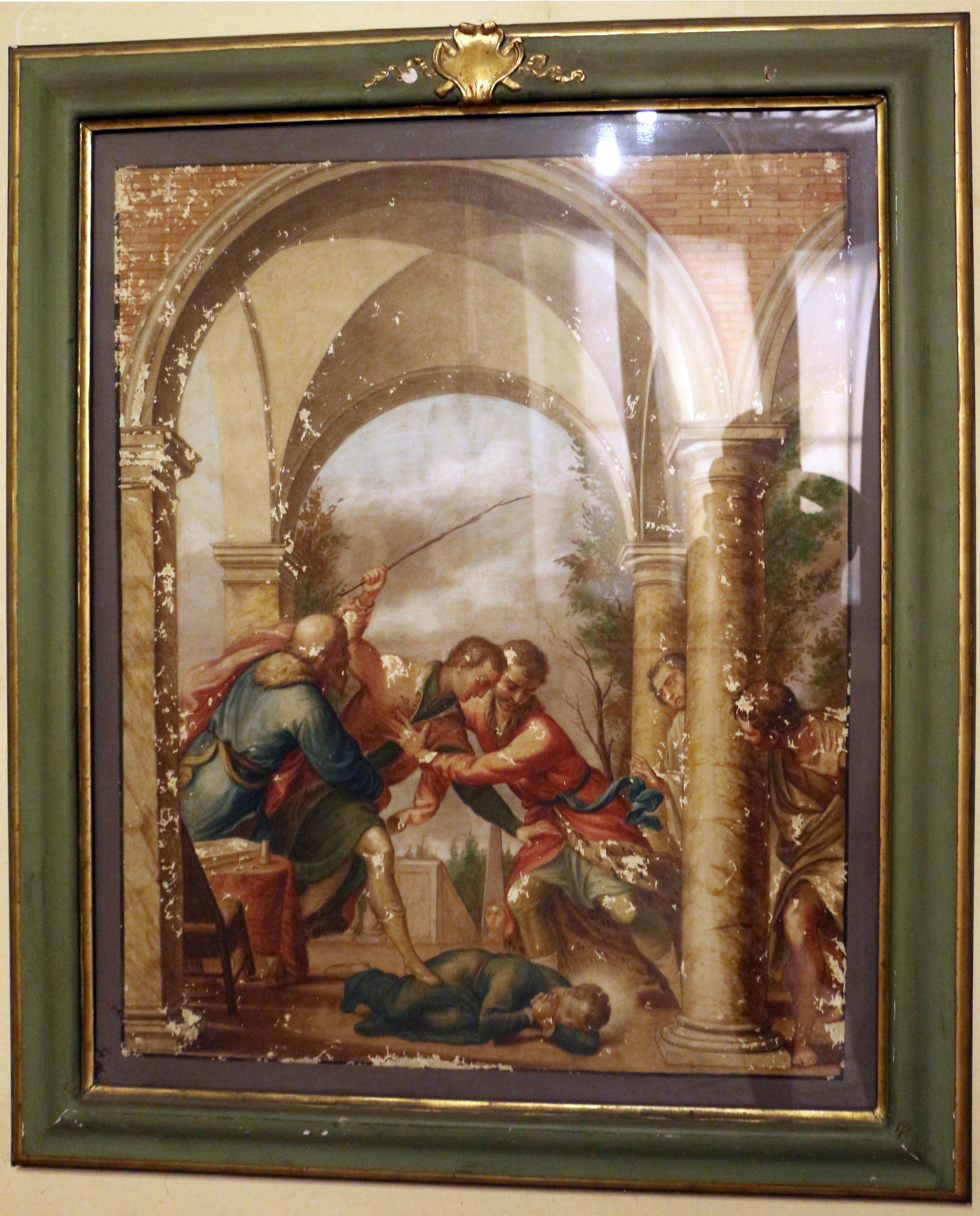
Stanislaus Kostka persecuted by his brother, painting by Andrea Pozzo

On the morning of the day on which he was to carry out his project he called his servant to him early and told him to notify his brother Paul and his tutor in the course of the morning that he would not be back that day to dinner. Then he started, exchanging the dress of gentleman for that of a mendicant, which was the only way to escape the curiosity of those he met. By nightfall Paul and the tutor comprehended that Stanislaus had fled, as he had threatened. They were seized with a fierce anger, and as the day was ended the fugitive had gained a day over them. They started to follow him, but were not able to overtake him; either their exhausted horses refused to go further, or a wheel of their carriage would break, or, as the tutor frankly declared, they had mistaken the route, having left the city by a different road from the one which Stanislaus had taken. It is noticeable that in his testimony Paul gives no explanation of his ill-luck.

Stanislaus stayed for a month at Dillingen, where the provincial of that time, Saint Peter Canisius, put the young aspirant's vocation to the test by employing him in the boarding-school. He arrived 25 October 1567 in Rome. As he was greatly exhausted by the journey, the general of the order, Saint Francis Borgia, would not permit him to enter the novitiate of Saint Andrew until several days later. During the ten remaining months of his life, according to the testimony of the master of novices, Father Giulio Fazio, "he was a model and mirror of religious perfection. Notwithstanding his very delicate constitution he did not spare himself the slightest penance". He had such a burning fever in his chest that he was often obliged to apply cold compresses."

=== Death ===
On the evening of the Feast of Saint Lawrence (10 August), Stanislaus fell ill with a high fever, and clearly saw that his last hour had come. He wrote a letter to the Blessed Virgin begging her to call him to the skies there to celebrate with her the glorious anniversary of her Assumption (15 August). His confidence in the Blessed Virgin, which had already brought him many favours, was this time again rewarded; on 15 August 1568, towards 4:00 in the morning, while he prayed he died. Many in the city proclaimed him a saint and people hastened from all parts to venerate his remains and to obtain, if possible, some relics.

== Veneration ==
=== Beatification process ===
The Holy See ratified his beatification in 1605; he was canonized in 1726. St. Stanislaus is a popular saint of Poland, and many religious institutions have chosen him as the protector of their novitiates. The representations of him in art are quite varied; he is sometimes depicted receiving Holy Communion from the hands of angels, or receiving the Infant Jesus from the hands of the Virgin, or in the midst of a battle putting to flight the enemies of his country. At times he is depicted near a fountain putting a wet linen cloth on his breast. He is invoked for palpitations of the heart and for dangerous cases of illness.

On 15 August 2018, Pope Francis wrote to the Bishop of Płock in honor of the 450th anniversary of Stanislaus's death. In his message, Pope Francis cites a maxim of Stanislaus's: "Ad maiora natus sum – 'I was born for greater things'."

=== Feast Day ===
- 13 November
- 18 September, regional calendar of Poland,

== Depiction in art ==
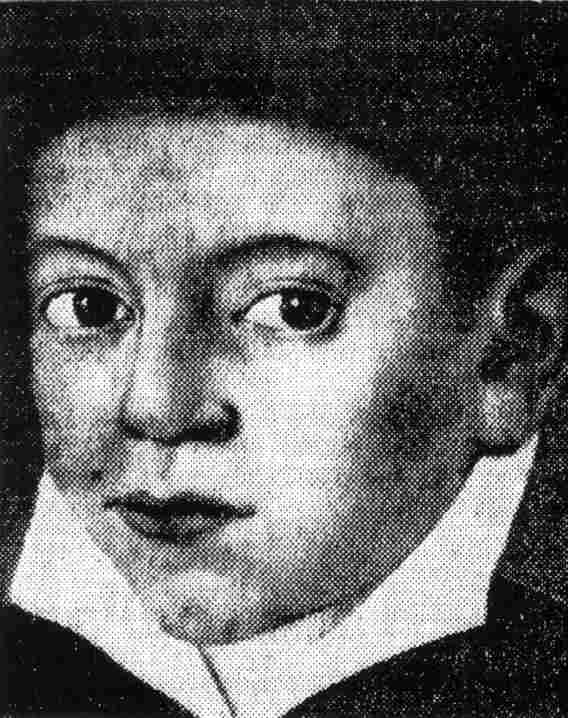
Scipione Delfine portrait

There is a portrait by Scipione Delfine, the oldest of St. Stanislaus in existence. Having probably been painted at Rome within two years of his death, it may be regarded as the best likeness.

Additionally, Pierre Le Gros, the younger completed a marble statue of the saint in 1705.

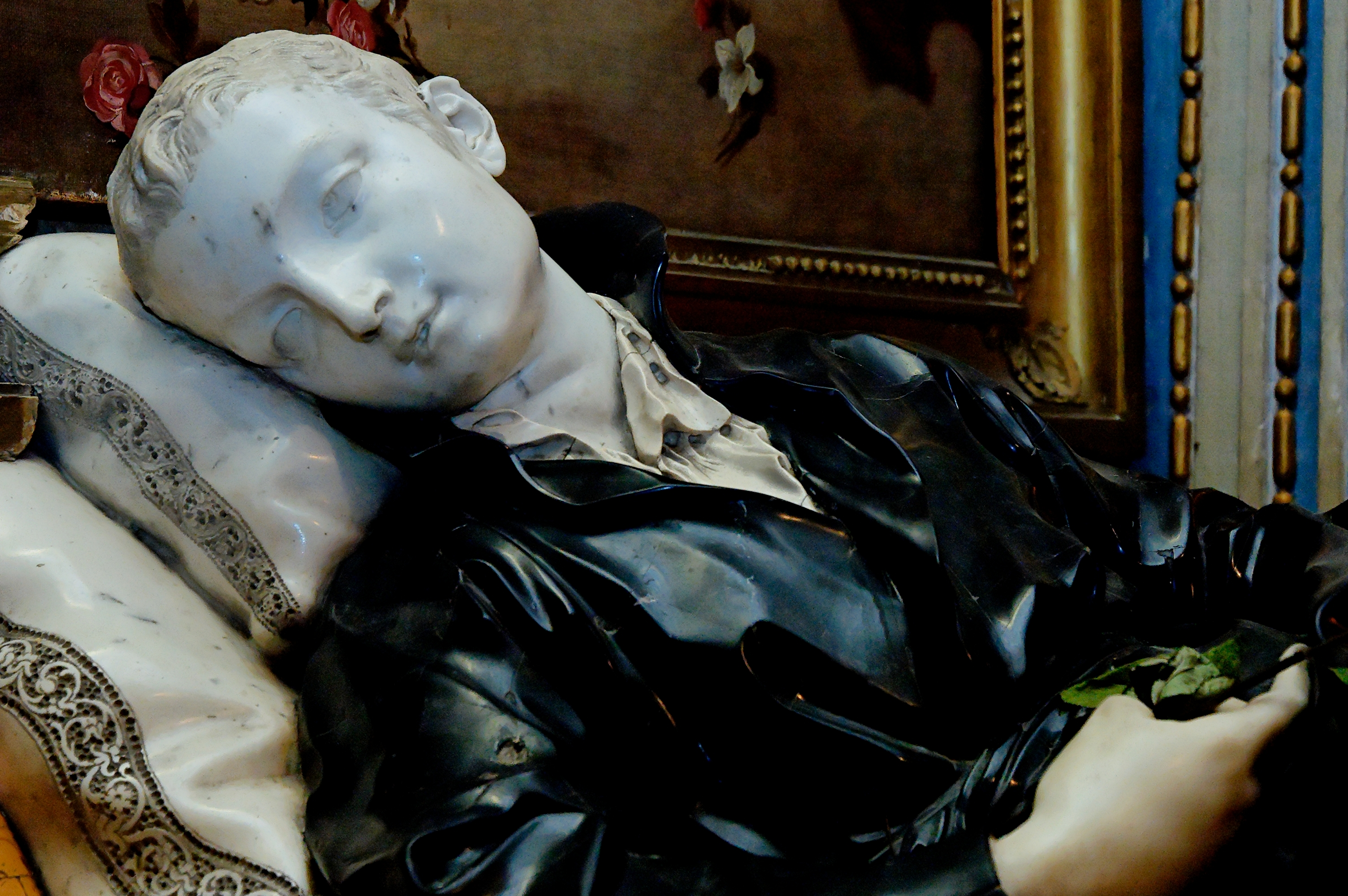
St. Stanisław Kostka on his death bed by Pierre Le Gros the Younger (1666–1719). Jesuit convent near Sant'Andrea al Quirinale, Rome.

== Depiction in literature ==
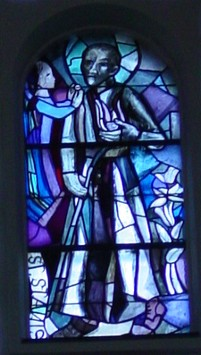
Stained glass window in Liesing

Thérèse of Lisieux wrote a play or "pious recreation" on Saint Stanislaus Kostka. Her sister Pauline had asked Thérèse to write verses and theatrical entertainment for liturgical and community festivals: "Like Stanislaus, [Therese] thought she was going to die young having accomplished nothing, 'with empty hands'. From then on, her desire to do good after her death intensified."

== Dedications ==
The following are some churches and institutions dedicated to Saint Stanislaus:

- San Stanislao, a church in Palermo, Sicily
- St. Stanislaus Forane Church, Mala, a Syro-Malabar church in Thrissur District, Kerala, India
- Saint Stanislaus College in Bay Saint Louis, Mississippi, a Catholic day and residential school for boys, founded in 1854 and chartered in 1870 as Saint Stanislaus College
- The former novitiate of the Central and Southern Province of the Society of Jesus, Saint Stanislaus Kostka at St.Charles College, located in Grand Coteau, Louisiana Saint Stanislaus is also a co-patron saint (along with Saint Ignatius of Loyola, founder of the Society of Jesus) of Strake Jesuit College Preparatory in Houston, Texas, where a statue of his image was erected in front of the Parsley Center, which houses an auditorium and music facilities. St. John's Jesuit High School and Academy of Toledo, Ohio, was one of the schools that used his name in their former house system.
- St. Stanislaus Kostka Church is a parish in Pittsburgh, Pennsylvania.
- Église Saint-Stanislas-de-Kostka is a parish in Montreal, located at 1350 Boulevard Saint-Joseph Est.
- Saint-Stanislas-de-Kostka, Quebec, Canada, is a municipality southwest of Montreal.
- St. Stanislaus High School in Bandra, Mumbai, is a Jesuit founded in 1863
- The St. Stanislaus Institute in Ljubljana, Slovenia, an educational institution founded in 1901, is named for Stanislaus Kostka.
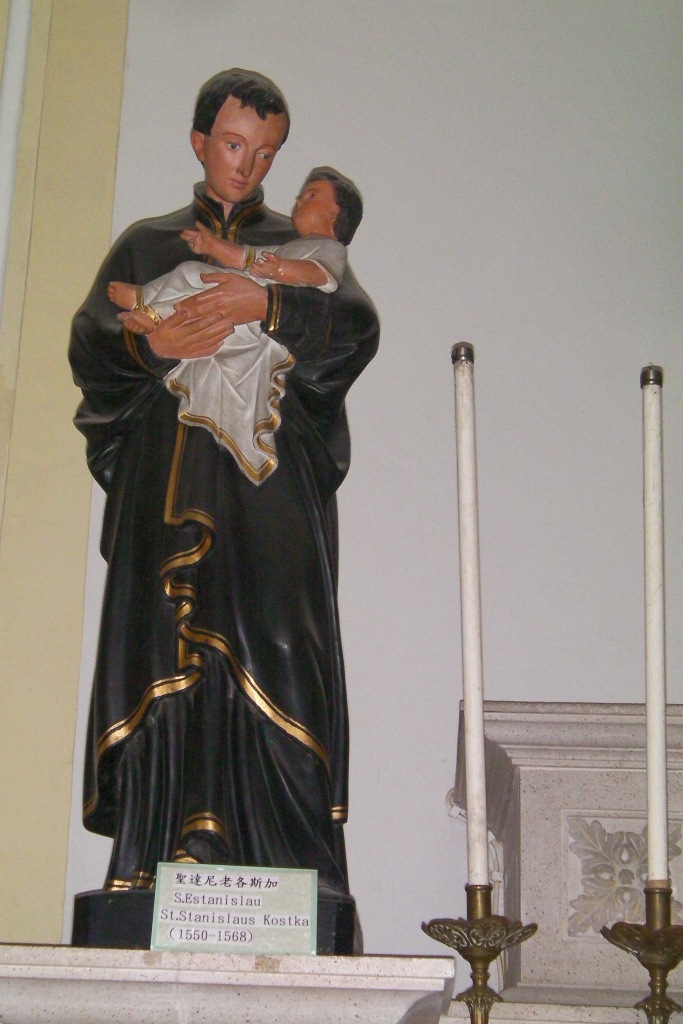
  Statue in St. Joseph, Macao
- Beaumont College, formerly a Jesuit public school in Berkshire in England, was dedicated to Saint Stanislaus. In Belgium, there is Collège Saint-Stanislas in Mons.
- Saint Stanisław Kostka Church in Coventry, England is a church of the Polish Catholic Mission.
- The Polish Saturday School in Manchester, England, founded in 1949 by the Manchester Polish Ex-Combatants Association, is named for Saint Stanislaw Kostka.
- Saint Stanislaus Secondary School is a Jesuit school located in Gdynia, Poland.
- St. Stanislaus College in Georgetown, Guyana is the third highest ranking high school in the country and was founded in the name of the patron Saint Stanislaus Kostka in 1866.
- St. Stanislaus Kostka Church (Chicago) opened in 1867. By 1897, St. Stanislaus Kostka Parish was the largest parish in the United States with 8,000 families, totaling 40,000 people. There were twelve Masses each Sunday: six Masses in the upper church and another six Masses in the lower church. St. Stanislaus Kostka Parish is considered the mother church of the many Polish parishes.
- On November 10, 2011, the Church of Saint Stanislaus Kostka in Winona, Minnesota, was elevated by Pope Benedict XVI to the status of Minor Basilica, making it the first ever Basilica of Saint Stanislaus Kostka.
- There is a St. Stanislaus Kostka Roman Catholic Church in Staten Island, New York.
- St Stanislaus; College is in Bathurst, New South Wales, Australia.
- The Roman Catholic Diocese of Burlington has St. Stanislaus Kostka Church in West Rutland, Vermont. The Parish served the Polish families and the first Mass was celebrated on Easter Sunday 1906.
- Saint Stanislaus Roman Catholic Church, located at 51 Lansdale Avenue in Lansdale, Pennsylvania; founded in 1876 as a parish of the Archdiocese of Philadelphia.
- Saint Stanislaus Kostka Church is in Rochester, New York.
- Saint Stanislaus Bishop and Martyr Roman Catholic Church is in Buffalo, New York.
- The first Catholic secondary school in Tonga, founded in 1865, was named after St Stanislaus; the same school has been known as Apifo'ou College since 1987.
- There is a St. Stanislaus Kostka Church in Hamilton, Ontario, Canada, located at 8 St. Ann Street. The 100th anniversary was celebrated in 2012.
- The town of Adams, Massachusetts has, as part of the parish of Adams and Cheshire, the St. Stanislaus Kostka parish.
- One of the four Houses of Saint Ignatius' College in Adelaide, South Australia, is named after St Stanislaus Kostka with a motto of "Walk in Strength, reflecting on his walk from Vienna to Rome to join the Society of Jesus.
- Stanislaus-Kostka-Chapel, Vienna, Austria. [https://www.geschichtewiki.wien.gv.at/Stanislaus-Kostka-Kapelle]
- Stanislaus-Kostka-Church, Vienna, Austria. [https://www.geschichtewiki.wien.gv.at/Stanislaus-Kostka-Kirche]

== See also ==
- List of Catholic saints

== Sources ==
- Frederick George Holweck, A Biographical Dictionary of the Saints. St. Louis, MO: B. Herder Book Co., 1924.
- This account has been drawn almost exclusively from the depositions of witnesses cited for the process of canonization of Stanislaus (cf. Archivio della Postulazione generale d. C. d. G., Roma).
