= Jalil Carter =

American gridiron football player (born 1989)

No. 19, 29
- Position: Cornerback

Personal information
- Born: July 18, 1989 (age 37); Toledo, Ohio, U.S.
- Listed height: 6 ft 1 in (1.85 m)
- Listed weight: 205 lb (93 kg)

Career information
- High school: St. John's Jesuit (Toledo)
- College: Akron
- NFL draft: 2011: undrafted

Career history
- St. Louis Rams (2011)*; Cleveland Gladiators (2012); Toronto Argonauts (2012–2014); Minnesota Vikings (2015)*; Hamilton Tiger-Cats (2015)
- * Offseason or practice squad member only

Awards and highlights
- Grey Cup champion (2012)

Career CFL statistics
- Total tackles: 114
- Sacks: 6
- Fumble recoveries: 1
- Interceptions: 1
- Stats at CFL.ca (archived)

Career AFL statistics
- Total tackles: 7
- Fumble recoveries: 1
- Interceptions: 1
- Stats at ArenaFan.com
- Stats at Pro Football Reference

Jalil Carter (born July 18, 1989) is an American former professional football cornerback. He played college football for the University of Akron Zips. He played for the Toronto Argonauts of the Canadian Football League (CFL), where he was a member of their 100th Grey Cup winning team. He also played for the Hamilton Tiger-Cats of the CFL, and the Cleveland Gladiators of the Arena Football League.

== Early life ==
Carter attended St. John's Jesuit High School in Toledo, Ohio, where he was a two-sport star in both football and track. A two-year starter at both wide receiver and cornerback, he earned first-team All-City League honors on offense as a senior after hauling in 31 receptions for 617 yards. Over his junior and senior years, he scored 16 touchdowns (14 rec, 2 rush) plus two on kick returns. He also recorded three interceptions as a senior, helping St. John's Jesuit post an 8–3 record and qualify for the Division I state playoffs in each of the past two seasons

Carter was also a standout sprinter on the track & field team. As a senior, he placed first in the 200 meters (22.27s) and ninth in the long jump (6.56m or 21 ft, 5.25 in) at the Regional Meet. He captured the 200-meter dash district title at 22.32 seconds, and also placed second in the 100 meters with a time of 10.99 seconds at the District Meet.

== College career ==
Carter attended the University of Akron from 2007 to 2009, where he played as a cornerback for the Akron Zips football team.

As a freshman in 2007, Carter was one of seven true freshmen to play in all 12 UA games, but was one of just two true freshmen (joining Almondo Sewell) to play in all 12 games. He saw most of his action on the special teams, also backing up Andre Jones at free safety.

As a sophomore in 2008, Carter played in all 12 games, starting each of the last seven at free safety. Despite only recording six tackles in his first five games, he then got 42 over the final seven as a starter. His 48 tackles for the season ranked ninth on the squad. He also added four pass breakups, third-best on the team, with a forced fumble, and an interception and blocked punt. He battled some injuries during fall camp.

As a junior in 2009, Carter mas named All-MAC Third Team performer. He appeared in all 12 games, starting the last seven contests at the strong safety spot. He ranked third on the team with 58 tackles, including 35 solos. Also second on the team with 246 yards on 13 kick returns (18.9 yards/attempt). He recorded a career-high 12 tackles, six solo, and an interception against Buffalo. He racked up 10 tackles, six solo, against Northern Illinois. He was credited with a half-sack at Bowling Green.

== Professional career ==
Pre-draft measurables
Height	Weight	40-yard dash	10-yard split	20-yard split	20-yard shuttle	Three-cone drill	Vertical jump	Broad jump	Bench press	Wonderlic
6 ft 1 in (1.85 m)	197 lb (89 kg)	4.38 s	1.43 s	2.50 s	4.34 s	7.19 s	37 in (0.94 m)	10 ft 5 in (3.18 m)	11 reps	x
All values from Pro Day

=== St. Louis Rams ===
Carter was signed by the St. Louis Rams on July 29, 2011. He was released on August 9, 2011.

=== Cleveland Gladiators ===
Carter played for the Cleveland Gladiators of the Arena Football League in 2012, totaling four solo tackles, six assisted tackles, one interception, and one fumble recovery.

=== Toronto Argonauts ===
Carter with the Toronto Argonauts of the Canadian Football League in 2012. Carter only played in 4 games during the 2012 CFL season, but was very productive in each game; totaling 18 tackles and 1 special team tackle. The following season Jalil Carter played in 17 of the 18 regular season games and accumulated 48 defensive tackles, 3 special teams tackles, 1 quarterback sack, 1 interception and 1 fumble recovery. His third season in the CFL, the 2014 CFL season, Carter also recorded 48 defensive tackles, 3 special teams tackles, to go along with 5 interceptions. In January 2015 Carter was granted an early release from the Argos so that he could sign with an NFL team.

=== Minnesota Vikings ===
On January 15, two days after being released by the Argos, Carter signed a contract with the Minnesota Vikings of the National Football League. He was released on August 31, 2015.

=== Hamilton Tiger-Cats ===
Carter dressed in four games, starting two, for the Hamilton Tiger-Cats of the CFL in 2015, recording nine defensive tackles, and one special teams tackle.
