= Deryn Bowser =

American football player (born 1987)

Deryn Boswer
No. 1
- Position: Wide receiver

Personal information
- Born: April 3, 1987 (age 39)
- Listed height: 6 ft 1 in (1.85 m)
- Listed weight: 210 lb (95 kg)

Career information
- High school: Los Angeles (CA) George Washington Prep
- College: Akron

Career history
- Arizona Cardinals (2010)*; Iowa Barnstormers (2012–2013)*
- * Offseason or practice squad member only

Awards and highlights
- First-team All-WSC (2006-2007); Third-team All-MAC (2008); LAHC Record 109 Career Receptions; LAHC Record 19 Touchdown Receptions
- Stats at ArenaFan.com

Deryn Bowser (born April 3, 1987) is an American former football player.

== Early life ==
Born the son of M. Dean and Deborah D. Bowser, Deryn attended Washington Preparatory High School in Los Angeles, California.

== College career ==
=== Los Angeles Harbor College ===
After high school, Bowser attended Los Angeles Harbor College, where he was a standout member of the football team. Bowser was twice named First Team All-Western State Conference and set school records for career receptions (109) and receiving touchdowns (19).

College recruiting
Name	Hometown	School	Height	Weight	40^{‡}	Commit date
Deryn Bowser; WR	Los Angeles, California	Los Angeles Harbor College	6 ft 3 in (1.91 m)	215 lb (98 kg)	4.5	Jan 29, 2008
Deryn Bowser; WR	Recruit ratings: Scout: Rivals: (NR)					
Overall recruit ranking: Scout: JC (WR) Rivals: -- (WR), -- (CA) ESPN: JC (WR)
Note: In many cases, Scout, Rivals, 247Sports, On3, and ESPN may conflict in their listings of height and weight.; In these cases, the average was taken. ESPN grades are on a 100-point scale.; Sources: "Akron Football Commitment List". Rivals.; "Akron College Football Recruiting Commits". Scout.; "Akron Zips 2008 Player Commits". ESPN.; "Scout.com Team Recruiting Rankings". Scout.; "2008 Team Ranking". Rivals.com.

Bowser signed with Akron on January 29, 2008. Bowser chose Akron over scholarship offers from Kansas State, Oregon State and Stony Brook.

=== Akron ===
Bowser started 16 games in his career for the Zips. Bowser was named 3rd Team All-Mid-American Conference in 2008. Bowser was having a productive 2009 season when he was injured during the Zips week 6 game against Buffalo.

=== Statistics ===
		Receiving					
Season	Team	GP	Rec	Yds	Avg	TD	Long
2008	Akron	12	64	785	12.3	4	60
2009	Akron	6	21	307	14.6	5	49
	Totals	18	85	1,092	12.8	9	60

== Professional career ==
=== Pre-draft ===
Prior to the 2010 NFL draft, Bowser was projected to be undrafted by NFLDraftScout.com. He was rated as the 164th-best wide receiver in the draft. He was not invited to the NFL Scouting Combine, he posted the following numbers during his Akron pro-day workouts:

Pre-draft measurables
Height	Weight	40-yard dash	10-yard split	20-yard split	20-yard shuttle	Three-cone drill	Vertical jump	Broad jump	Bench press
6 ft 0 in (1.83 m)	212 lb (96 kg)	4.72 s	1.58 s	2.79 s	4.57 s	7.06 s	31.5 in (0.80 m)	9 ft 3 in (2.82 m)	12 reps
All values from 2010 Akron Pro Day

=== Arizona Cardinals ===
After failing to hear his named called in the 2010 NFL draft, Bowser signed as an undrafted free agent with the Arizona Cardinals. He was waived on August 3, 2010.

=== Iowa Barnstormers ===
In 2012, Bowser was assigned to the Iowa Barnstormers of the Arena Football League. Bowser suffered a knee injury during 2012 training camp, and missed the entire 2012 season. Bowser was assigned to the Barnstormers on November 2, 2012 for the 2013 season.
