= Dave Butler (American football) =

American football player (born 1965)

No. 92
- Position: Linebacker

Personal information
- Born: July 17, 1965 (age 61); Ridgewood, New Jersey, U.S.
- Listed height: 6 ft 4 in (1.93 m)
- Listed weight: 225 lb (102 kg)

Career information
- High school: St. John's
- College: Notre Dame
- NFL draft: 1987: undrafted

Career history
- Cincinnati Bengals (1987)*; Cleveland Browns (1987)
- * Offseason or practice squad member only
- Stats at Pro Football Reference

David Michael Butler (born July 17, 1965) is an American former professional football linebacker who played for the Cleveland Browns in 1987. He played college football at University of Notre Dame.
