= Rostkowo =

Rostkowo may refer to:

- Rostkowo, Płock County, Poland
- Rostkowo, Przasnysz County, Poland, the birthplace of Saint Stanislaus Kostka
