= St. Stanislaus Forane Church, Mala =

St. Stanislaus Church
- St. Stanislaus Forane Church, Mala
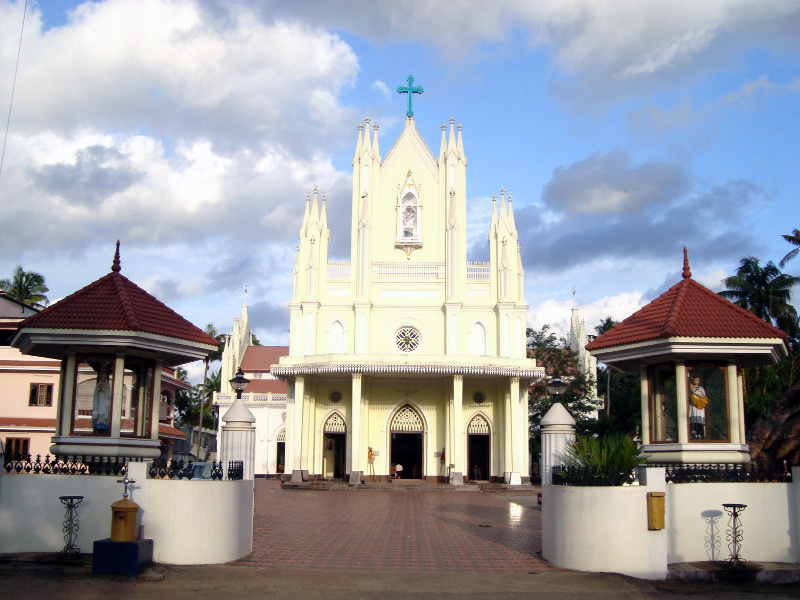
- St. Stanislaus Church
- 10.2434404°N 76.2634311°E
- Location: Mala
- Country: India
- Denomination: Syro-Malabar Catholic
- Website: stanislausforanechurchmala.com

History
- Status: Forane

Architecture
- Functional status: Active

Administration
- District: Thrissur
- Archdiocese: Syro-Malabar Catholic Archeparchy of Thrissur (Syro-Malabar)
- Diocese: Irinjalakuda Diocese

Clergy
- Bishop: Mar Pauly Kannookadan
- Vicar: Fr John Paramman

St. Stanislaus Forane Church is an active Syro-Malabar church located in Mala, Thrissur district, in Kerala, India.

== History ==
The church is reputed to be the only church in Asia which has as its patron St Stanislaus Kostka (28 October 1550 – 15 August 1568), a Polish saint and was built in 1840. The land for this church was donated by well-known families in Mala. They formed the 'Darshanan Sabha', a Portuguese tradition still being followed and in practice in the church.
