= San Stanislao Kostka, Palermo =

Church building in Palermo, Italy

Church of Saint Stanislaus Kostka
- Chiesa di San Stanislao Kostka
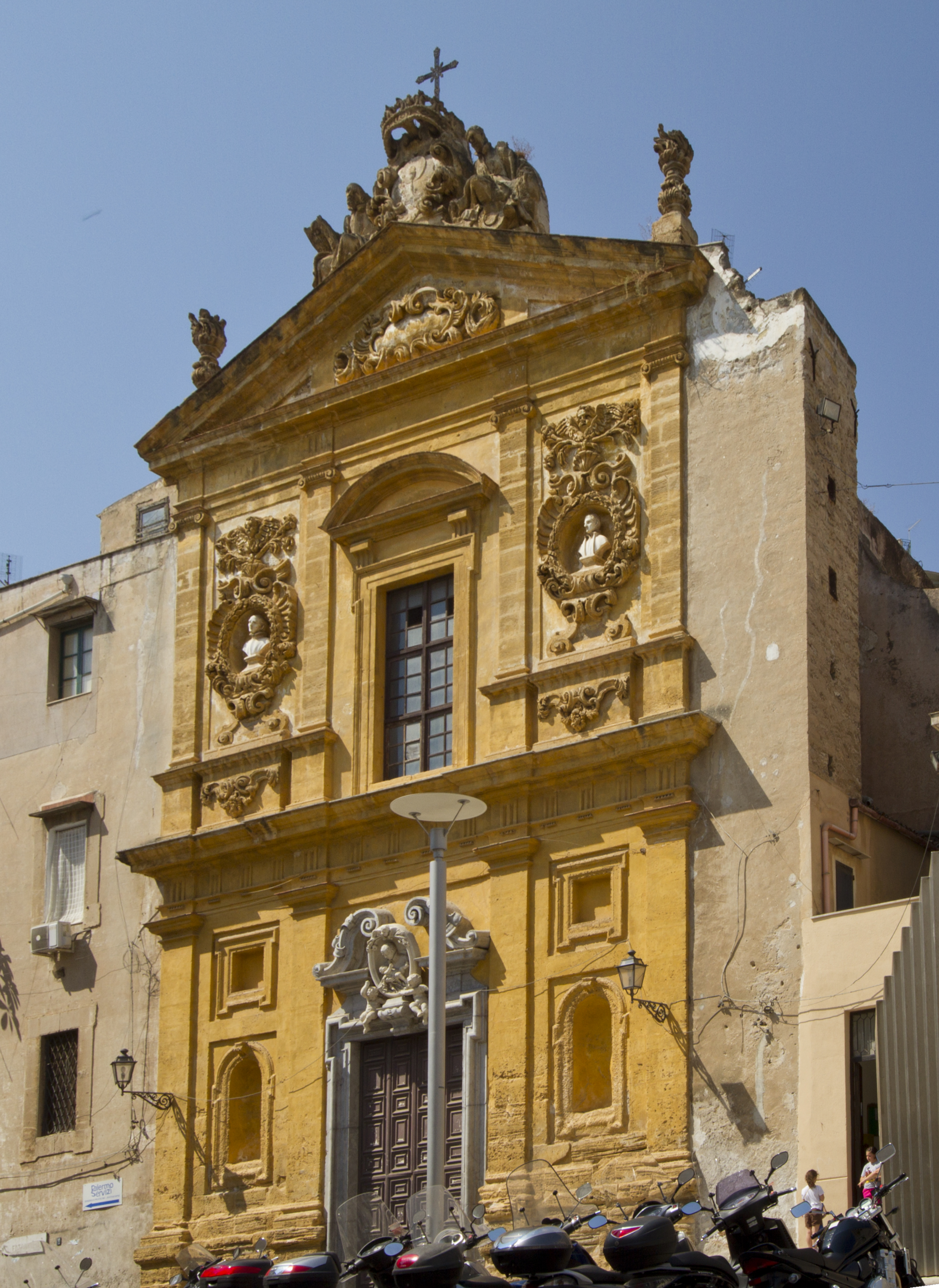

Religion
- Affiliation: Roman Catholic
- Province: Archdiocese of Palermo
- Rite: Roman Rite

Location
- Location: Palermo, Italy
- Interactive map of Church of Saint Stanislaus Kostka
- Coordinates: 38.11773°N 13.35201°E

San Stanislao Kostka is a Roman Catholic parish church located on 24 Via del Noviziato in the city of Palermo, region of Sicily, Italy.

== History ==
The church was erected in 1607 by the Jesuit order with designs by Natale Masuccio. It served as the church for an adjacent Jesuit seminary. However, after the expulsion of the Jesuits from the Kingdom of Naples in 1767, the seminary was used as barracks for the royal troops. In 1814, the church was restored to the Jesuit order. During the revolution of 1848, the adjacent former seminary was leveled by revolutionaries. The area is now replaced by modern government buildings. Above the portal is a bas-relief in a medallion sculpted by Giacomo Pennino depicting Stanislaus Kostka in adoration of the infant Jesus. On the second floor are two busts of Jesuit saints. The roofline has a coat of arms of the Jesuit order with flanking stone urns with flames.

The interior has a rich stucco and colored marble decoration. It includes stucco work by Giacomo Serpotta. The church is also rich in frescoes. The church also has a venerated icon of the Virgin, known as the Madonna del Lume, which is an alternate name for the church.
