= Jeremy R. Bruce =

American orthopedic surgeon

Dr. Jeremy Bruce is an Orthopaedic Surgeon at Erlanger Hospital in Chattanooga, Tennessee. He is also a Program Director and Director of Sports Medicine for the Orthopedic Residency program at The University of Tennessee College of Medicine in Chattanooga. He is a ringside physician that has covered UFC fights, Bellator fights, Ringside World Boxing championship, USA Boxing events and is a member of the USA Boxing Medical Commission. Dr. Bruce was a member of the USA Bobsled and Skeleton Team and competed alongside future Olympic gold medalist Jim Shea in the North American Skeleton Championship in Calgary, AL (1994).

== Education ==
He received his BS, MS from Springfield College. He got his medical degree from the Medical College of Georgia and then residency from University of Tennessee College of Medicine in Chattanooga. Dr. Bruce completed his fellowship training in sports medicine from the Andrews Institute, in Gulf Breeze, Florida.

== Research and career ==
According to Dr. Jeremy Bruce's research on Ulnar Collateral Ligament Reconstruction shows that it has increased 10-fold in the first decade of the 21st century. He also quoted that due to the trend of UCL injuries continues to be on the rise, athletes aged 14 to 16 are less likely to return to the sport after Tommy John surgery.

== Publications ==
- How much valgus instability can be expected with ulnar collateral ligament (UCL) injuries? A review of 273 baseball players with UCL injuries.
- Revision Ulnar Collateral Ligament Reconstruction.
- Ulnar collateral ligament injuries in the throwing athlete.
- Magnetic resonance imaging-based classification for ulnar collateral ligament injuries of the elbow.
- Viable stem cells are in the injury effusion fluid and arthroscopic by-products from knee cruciate ligament surgery: An in vivo analysis.
- Biomechanical tensile strength analysis for medial patellofemoral ligament reconstruction.
