= Andre Jones (defensive back) =

American football player (born 1985)

No. 5, 12
- Position: Defensive back

Personal information
- Born: May 25, 1985 (age 41); Forestville, Maryland, U.S.
- Listed height: 5 ft 11 in (1.80 m)
- Listed weight: 200 lb (91 kg)

Career information
- High school: Avon (CT) Old Farms
- College: Akron
- NFL draft: 2010: undrafted

Career history
- Milwaukee Mustangs (2011); San Jose SaberCats (2012); San Antonio Talons (2013); Los Angeles Kiss (2014); Pittsburgh Power (2014); Spokane Shock (2015); Philadelphia Yellow Jackets (2016)

Awards and highlights
- Second-team All-Arena (2011); Third-team All-MAC (2008)

Career AFL statistics
- Total tackles: 264
- Forced fumbles: 2
- Fumble recoveries: 5
- Pass deflections: 53
- Interceptions: 26
- Stats at ArenaFan.com

Andre Jones (born May 25, 1985) is an American former football defensive back. He played college football at the University of Akron.

== Early life ==
Born the son of Shannon Jones, Andre attended Forestville High School in Forestville, Maryland. After high school, Jones prepend at Avon Old Farms School.

== College career ==
Jones continued his football career when he attended the University of Akron. He was named a starting safety in 2006 and 2007. His junior year, coach J. D. Brookhart moved Jones to wide receiver.

== Professional career ==
=== Milwaukee Mustangs ===
Jones signed with the Milwaukee Mustangs of the Arena Football League in 2011. Jones had 12 interceptions his rookie year, earning him Second Team All-Arena honors.

=== San Jose SaberCats ===
In 2012, Jones played for the San Jose SaberCats.

=== San Antonio Talons ===
In 2013, Jones was assigned to the San Antonio Talons.

=== Los Angeles Kiss ===
On February 21, 2014, Jones was traded to the Los Angeles Kiss in exchange for Mark Crawford and Jeremy Lewis. He was released on May 6, 2014.

=== Pittsburgh Power ===
Jones was signed by the Pittsburgh Power on May 22, 2014. Jones played in 6 games for the Power, recording 13 tackles, 1 pass breakup and 1 interception. He also returned 10 kickoffs for 144 yards. The Power folded in November 2014.

=== Spokane Shock ===
On March 19, 2015, Jones was assigned to the Spokane Shock. Jones was placed on recallable reassignment on May 26, 2015.

=== Philadelphia Yellow Jackets ===
In 2016, Jones signed with the Philadelphia Yellow Jackets. He was released on May 24, 2016.
