= J. D. Brookhart =

American football player and coach (born 1964)

Current position
- Title: Wide receivers coach
- Team: Akron
- Conference: MAC

Biographical details
- Born: October 17, 1964 (age 60); Pueblo, Colorado, U.S.

Playing career
- 1984: BYU
- 1985–1987: Colorado State
- Position(s): Wide receiver

Coaching career (HC unless noted)
- 1995–1996: Denver Broncos (assistant)
- 1997–1998: Pittsburgh (TE)
- 1999: Pittsburgh (WR)
- 2000–2003: Pittsburgh (OC/WR)
- 2004–2009: Akron
- 2011–2012: Colorado (PGC/TE/ST)
- 2024–present: Akron (WR)

Head coaching record
- Overall: 29–43
- Bowls: 0–1

Accomplishments and honors

Championships
- As coach: MAC (2005); As player: National (1984)

Awards
- MAC Coach of the Year (2004)

Joseph Daniel Brookhart (born October 17, 1964) is an American football coach and former player. He is the wide receivers coach for the University of Akron, a position he has held since 2024. He was formerly an assistant coach at the University of Colorado at Boulder, where he was hired as passing game coordinator, tight ends coach, and special teams coordinator on Jon Embree's staff in December 2010. Brookhart was the head coach at the University of Akron from 2004 to 2009, compiling a record of 30–42. His Akron Zips won the Mid-American Conference (MAC) in 2005, and he was honored as the MAC Coach of the Year the previous season. Brookhart played college football at Brigham Young University as a freshman walk-on before transferring to Colorado State University. He has also served as an assistant coach at the University of Pittsburgh and with the Denver Broncos of the National Football League (NFL).

== Playing career ==
As a three-year starter at wide receiver for the Colorado State Rams, Brookhart finished his career sixth on the program's list of all-time receptions with 111. As of 2006 he was still ranked tenth and with 1,873 career receiving yards is ranked seventh. He was selected an GTE Academic All-American his senior year. After graduation with a bachelor's degree, he signed with the Los Angeles Rams in 1988 but was released the same year.

== Coaching career ==
=== Early years ===
Brookhart worked for The International golf tournament in Denver, managing the event's corporate hospitality tents for one year. He then worked for Xerox Corporation. Within three years of selling copiers he was awarded the President's Club Award, an honor given to those who meet a sales quota among the company's top-15 percent. He then worked for two other companies in the Denver and Salt Lake City area. He had been managing a speed camp on the side of his career for high school and collegiate football players.

Brookhart decided to forgo his business career and accepted an unpaid position with the Denver Broncos in 1995. Two years later, he became the assistant coach of tight ends for the Pittsburgh Panthers. He moved on to the wide receivers assistant coach position in 1999 and added offensive coordinator duties in 2000. He coached Larry Fitzgerald.

== Akron ==
Brookhart became the 25th head coach of Akron on December 15, 2003, the program's third head coach since gaining NCAA Division I-A status in 1987. In his second season, he led the Zips to their first Mid-American Conference (MAC) championship and their first bowl game in school history, the 2005 Motor City Bowl, which they lost, 38–31, to the Memphis. He was fired after the 2009 season when the Zips went 3-9.

== Personal life ==
Brookhart is married to Jami Brookhart, and they have four children: Joey, JT, John, and Jake.

== Head coaching record ==
Year	Team	Overall	Conference	Standing	Bowl/playoffs
Akron Zips (Mid-American Conference) (2004–2009)
2004	Akron	6–5	6–2	2nd (East)	
2005	Akron	7–6	5–3	1st (East)	L Motor City
2006	Akron	4–8	3–5	6th (East)	
2007	Akron	4–8	3–5	5th (East)	
2008	Akron	5–7	3–5	5th (East)	
2009	Akron	3–9	2–6	6th (East)	
Akron:		29–43	22–26		
Total:		29–43			
National championship Conference title Conference division title or championship game berth
