= Rostkowo, Przasnysz County =

Rostkowo
- Village
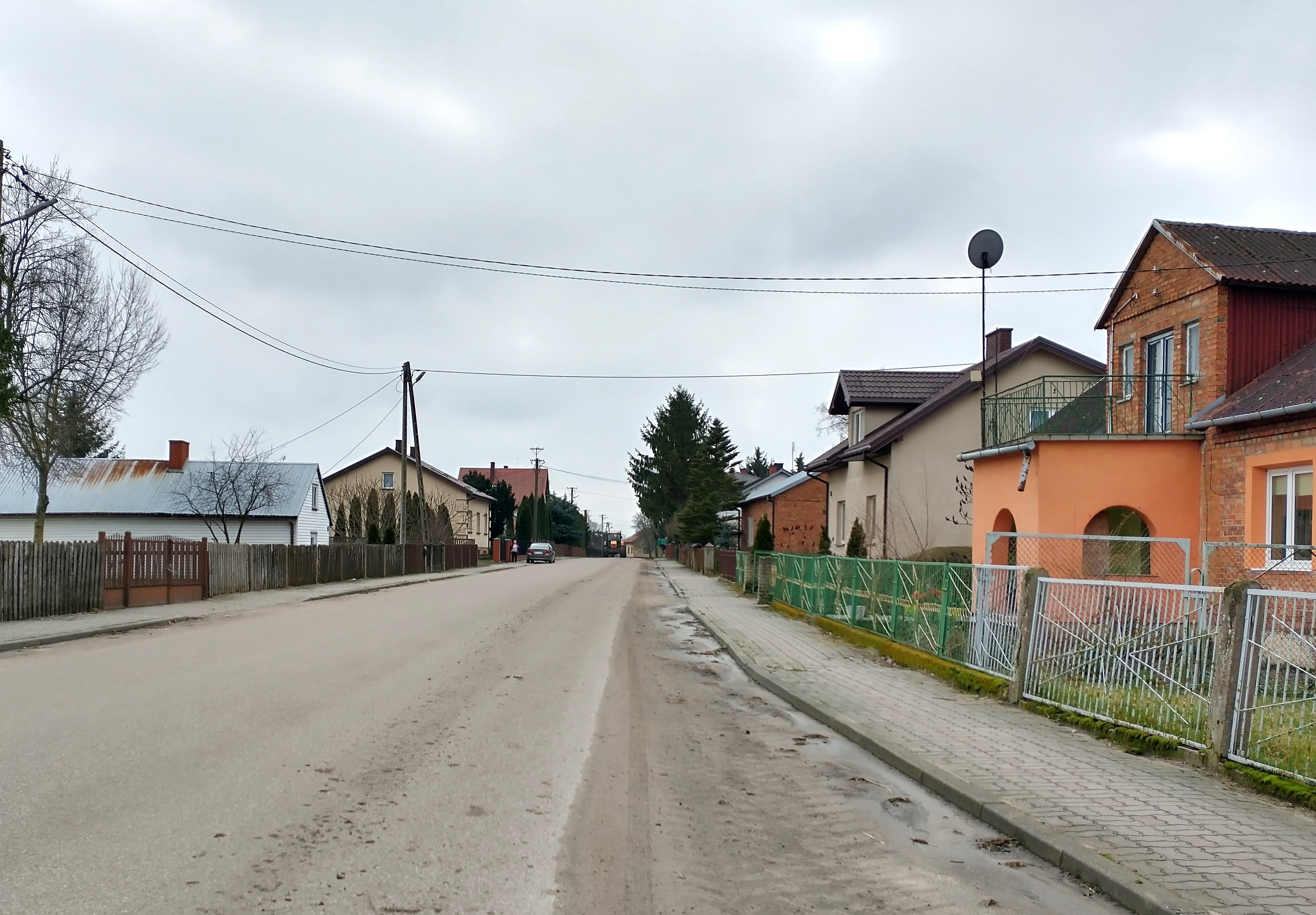

- Location within Poland
- Coordinates: 53°0′12″N 20°48′39″E
- Country: Poland
- Voivodeship: Masovian
- County: Przasnysz
- Gmina: Czernice Borowe
- Population (approx.): 380

Rostkowo [rɔstˈkɔvɔ] is a village in the administrative district of Gmina Czernice Borowe, within Przasnysz County, Masovian Voivodeship, in east-central Poland.

The village is the birthplace of saint Stanislaus Kostka. The church in Rostkowo is his sanctuary.
