= Mala, Kerala =

Mala
- Town
- Location in Kerala, India Mala (India)
- Coordinates: 10.240180695251047°N 76.2611918324199°E
- Country: India
- State: Kerala
- District: Thrissur

Government
  - Type: Panchayati Raj (India)
  - Body: Mala Grama Panchayath, Poyya Grama Panchayath

Area
  - Total: 28.35 km^{2} (10.95 sq mi)

Population (2011)
  - Total: 34,371
  - Density: 1,212/km^{2} (3,140/sq mi)

Languages
  - Official: Malayalam, English
- Time zone: UTC+5:30 (IST)
- Telephone code: 0480
- Vehicle registration: KL-45, KL-64
- Lok Sabha constituency: Chalakudy
- Website: www.mala.co.in

Mala is a small town in Thrissur district of Kerala state, India. There is a Jewish synagogue in Mala town. At the moment, it is in ruins. The famous Pambu Mekkattu Mana (temple) is located here and attracts thousands of devotees every year.

== History ==
Mala is a multicultural society. Migrants from different parts of the world settled in Mala; especially noteworthy are the Jews from Israel, Brahmins from the Konkan and Kudumbis and Konkanis from Goa.

It had a major inland port, and people from Ambazhakad, Kuzhur, Kadukutty, and other people used to bring their goods to Mala to transport it to Kottapuram or Kochi. The major items of trade were betel leaves, cut stone (Vettu Kall), toddy, coconut, spices, and wood. Today it does not have such importance because of the high network of roads.

In olden times, Mala used to be affected by floods in monsoons. The business was not very much concerned because a major mode of transport was through the water itself.

Tipu Sultan attacked it. Nedumkotta(Travancore lines) had passed through Kottamuri, Vattakotta. The fort was made by dumping soil to a height of 15 to 16 meters. After the defeat of Tipu Sultan, this fort was leveled gradually, but now also as you move towards the south of Mala, you will experience many ups and downs. And names also derived due to the presence of fort. Kottamury And Vattakota are an example of that. Literally, in Malayalam Kottamury means "where the fort is cut" (Kotta = fort; Mury = cut), and Vattakotta means "round fort."

== Education ==
Mala is a major educational educational hub consisting of four higher secondary schools, six English and Malayalam medium high schools, two engineering colleges, a BEd college, an MBA college, a government industrial training institute, a medical college, and many other professional institutions. Some of the famous educational institutions are MET's School of Engineering, Al-Azhar School, Government Model LP School (established in 1893), Holy Child School, Holy Grace Academy, St. Antony's High School, Soccorso Convent School, St. Joseph's College, St. Theresa's College, Kadicheeni Training Institute, Jesus Training college, St. Antony's College, Carmel College, Mala for Women and GTEC Computer Education.

== Tourism ==
Mala is very scenic. Its proximity to the 'back-waters' connected to the Arabian sea, makes it a unique small town between Chalakkudy and Kodungallur.

The Jewish synagogue, Jewish cemetery, Neithakudy, Chumgam, KAMCO, and Karingichira are among the local points of interest. It is also included in the Musris Heritage Project as it was a major inland port which had routes to Kochi and other financial ports.

One of the oldest Carmelite monasteries, St. Theresa's, is located near this town, in a village called Kottackal. This monastery was built by Blessed Chavara Kuriakose, founder of the Carmelites of Mary Immaculate, in 1867 AD. Mala is also famous for the Parish Forane church named after St. Stanislaus Cosca.

== Religion ==
St. Stanislaus Forane Church, Mala, is a famous landmark in this town. It is the only church in Asia named after this Polish saint. Perhaps the missionaries from Poland, who were residing at Ambazhekad, founded this church.

There is also a Mukunda Krishna Swami Temple of Goud Saraswat Brahmins in Mala. This temple celebrated its centenary in June 2010.

Mohiyuddien Juma Masjid Mala, which is established in 640 AD, is one of the oldest mosques in India. It is said that establishing the first mosque was at Kodungallur, and the second one was at Mala.

The well-known Mahadeva Kshetram (Mahadeva Temple) is about 7 km from Mala town. This temple is famous for the "Panchaiswaryangal" (five miracles) and the unique Brahmani Pattu – a ritual in Kerala for praying to the goddess Parvati by Brahmani people. In this temple, the ladies from Vadakke Pushpakam, Mala. Iranikkulam Vadakke Pushpakam houses do the rituals every day. Important festivals here are in Thiruvathira days. Unmarried girls from across Kerala come here to pray to the goddess Parvati for successful marriages and long life for their families.

Pambummekkattu Mana is the most famous serpent worship center in Kerala. The temple is about 3 km from Mala centre. The Pambummekattu Mana stands in Vadama village, in Mukundapuram Taluk of Thrissur District of Kerala. When we reach Mekkattu Mana, we can see a wall with figures of serpents painted on it. To the north is an arch-shaped entrance inscribed with serpent figures. As one goes further, thick, tall trees and small temples (Kavu) catch our attention. That leads to the 'Sarpakavu.' The serpent gods Nagaraja (male god) and Naga Yakshi (female god) reside in the eastern portion of Mekkattu Mana. There are no idols of these gods, but daily poojas are conducted in their honour.

== Population ==
The people of Mala have high social and secular values. Different communities live in peace with each other despite very diverse beliefs. Mala panchayath population is 40% Hindus, 35% Christian, and 25% Muslims.

== Transport ==
The Ksrtc bus stand was the brainchild of former chief minister of Kerala, Sri K. Karunakaran. Mala also has a private bus stand that has frequent schedules to Thrissur, Chalakudy, Kodungaloor, Aluva. The boat service was a traffic method before road transport was regular. Nearest villages of Mala town is Neithakudy, Paranattukunnu, Kunnathukad, Vadama, Kavanad, Pattalapady, Kottamuri, Kodothkunnu.

== Politics ==
Mala Assembly Constituency Was Represented By Congress Veteran K. Karunakaran. With the redrawing of constituencies, Mala became part of the Kodungallur Assembly constituency.

== Cinema ==
Cinema is a small part of the people in Mala. Ganga Movies and Mahalakshmi cinemas (Ashtamichira) are theatres now. Late Mala Aravindan, and Joju George are the notable actors from Mala, also Jibi Mala movie writer and director, late Mohan Raghavan, who directed T.D. Dasan std. VI B, Aniyan Chithrasala Cinematographer are from here. In Mala, there are some short filmmakers, who are hoping the entry to the industry. Rahul John is a well-known celebrity photographer who has been in the Malayalam film industry for years. Cyril Cherian, who was the director and actor of the Short Film 'IF,' got first prize in Manorama CSFF 2016 and also Tom John's short film 'Jose?' which came in the final round was widely appreciated for the script with the given topic MISSED CALL.
