= St. John's Jesuit High School and Academy =

High school in Ohio, United States

St. John's Jesuit High School & Academy

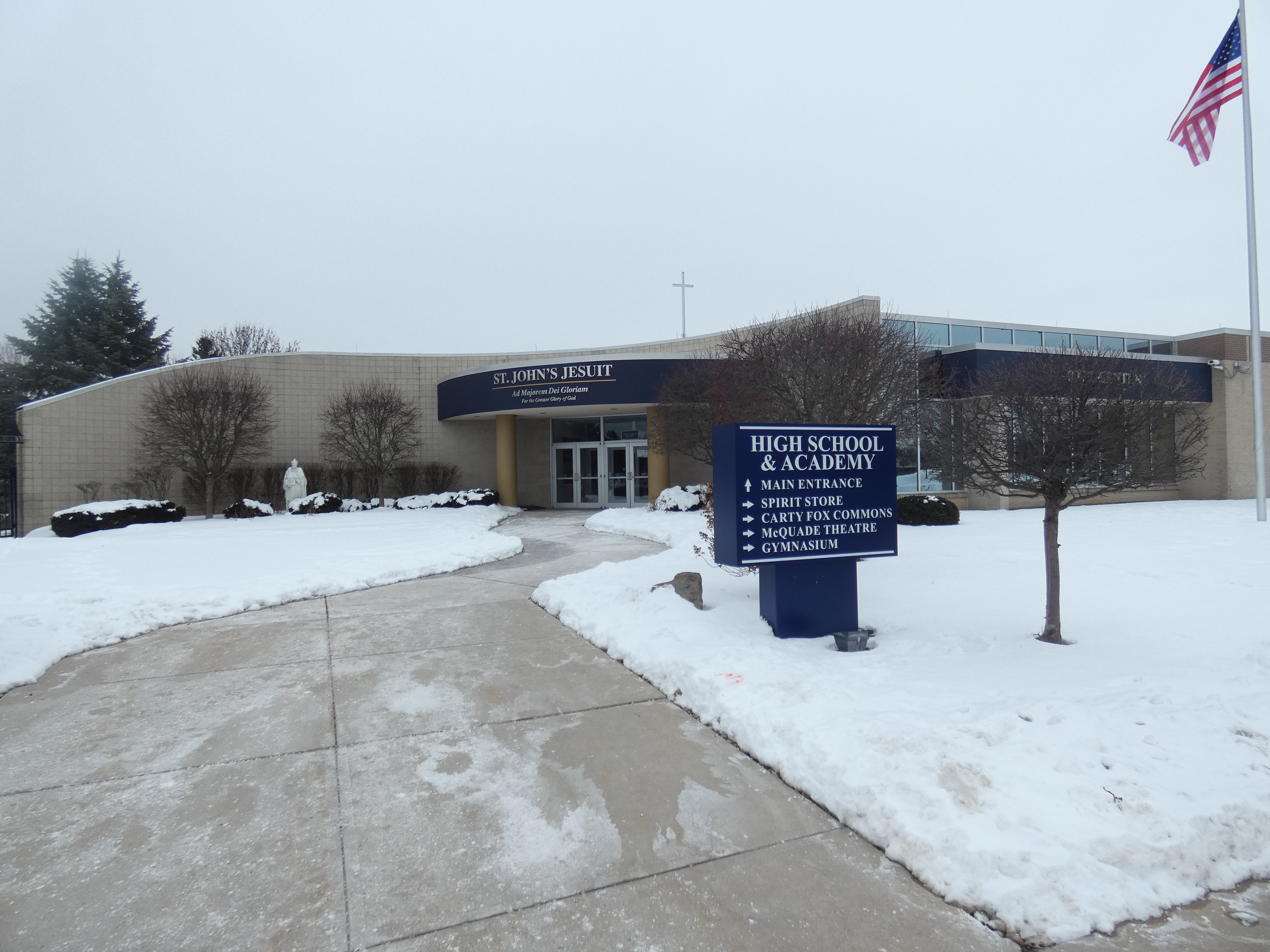
- Front entrance of the school

Location
- 5901 Airport Highway; Toledo, Ohio, (Lucas County) 43615; United States; 41°36′47″N 83°40′59″W

Information
- Type: Private, all-male, college-preparatory high school and middle school
- Motto: Ad maiorem Dei gloriam (For the Greater Glory of God)
- Patron saint: St. John Berchmans
- Established: 1883 (re-established in 1965)
- President: Karl Ertle
- Chairman: Jeff Savage
- Principal: Brendan Malone ‘01
- Grades: 6–12
- Enrollment: 725
- Colors: Blue & Vegas gold
- Athletics conference: Catholic High School League
- Mascot: Titans
- Accreditation: North Central Association of Colleges and Schools; Jesuit Secondary Education Association; Ohio Department of Education
- Affiliations: Society of Jesus, Roman Catholic Diocese of Toledo
- Website: www.sjjtitans.org

St. John's Jesuit High School & Academy comprises two schools on the same campus: St. John's Jesuit High School (SJJ) and St. John's Jesuit Academy (SJJA). It is located within the Roman Catholic Diocese of Toledo. Both are private, all-male Jesuit schools in Toledo, Ohio.

St. John's Jesuit Academy was started as a pilot program with its first class of 30 seventh and 30 eighth graders during the 2004–2005 school year. A sixth grade was added in the 2011–2012 school year and the academy currently enrolls 160 students.

== Background ==
=== History ===
St. John's was founded as St. John's College by the Jesuits in 1898 in downtown Toledo, at 807 Superior St. Built in 1899 and 1909, it was demolished in 1976 and 1978. It was a liberal arts college with a business administration program and a law school that subsequently became a foundation unit of the current University of Toledo College of Law.

Before the shuttering of the college, the Jesuits had purchased property near what is now Gesu church and school, until recently a Jesuit work, for the relocation of its campus. The land was subsequently used as the campus for St. Francis de Sales High School, sponsored by the Oblates of St. Francis de Sales. When the new St. John's opened its doors in 1965 on Airport Highway in Toledo as a college-prep high school, the school took the Titan as its mascot. The schools now have the most-followed high school rivalry in the greater Toledo area..

Over the years the school has grown (See: Renovations below) to include a new tech wing and athletic facility. The most marked addition to the campus is the new junior high academy. The St. John's Jesuit Academy was added in the 2004–2005 school year, offering seventh and eighth grade college-prep curriculum as well as high school, college-prep, and honors curricula. In 2011, the academy expanded to a 6-8 middle school.

=== Christian Service ===
One of the goals of a Jesuit education, found in the St. John's Mission Statement, is educating "men-for-others" (taken from a 1973 address by the Rev. Pedro Arrupe, former Superior General of the Society of Jesus). As a result, St. John's focuses its education on the "whole person", instilling the values of service in its students. All high school students are required to complete a service project of varying hours in order to pass three of the four compulsory theology courses; Academy students have a similar requirement. The high school also has a Christian Service department that sends students into the greater Toledo area to do service work throughout the school day. This program also organizes on-campus events for inner-city school children such as the annual Easter and Christmas on campus.

=== Campus Ministry ===
SJJ Campus Ministry organizes Mass in the McDonough chapel and feast-Masses for the community in the Chapel of St. John Berchmans. The department also reads a prayer each morning at 8:10 a.m. and an Examen prayer, a form of the examination of conscience adapted from the Spiritual Exercises of St. Ignatius Loyola, each afternoon.

=== Renovations ===
A $3.8 million renovation to the school's Commons and surrounding area, completed in November 2007, added a student-union type atmosphere to the Commons and a performing arts wing. The new Carty Fox Commons now includes a student lounge, food court, and a new book and spirit store. The new Sawicki Center performing arts wing includes a band room, chorus room, instrument storage, director's offices, practice rooms, recording studio, and remodelled McQuade Theater which has been renovated with new lecture chairs, lighting and sound equipment, and an improved stage. A set-storage room was added and an exterior entrance off the Carty Fox Commons.

St. John's added a technology wing, including a news studio for its television channel TV-4, a music technology lab similar to college music composition labs, the Jesuit mural, two computer labs, and the Iott Center library. Following the addition of the tech wing, St. John's added the Lyden Center weight-training facility (largest in the City League), the auxiliary gym, an athletic trainer's office, and renovations to the main gym including a new floor. Also added were chemistry and physics lecture halls, a physics classroom, computer graphic-design lab, and state-of-the-art chemistry and biology labs.

== School trademarks ==
=== School patron ===
The School Patron is St. John Berchmans, a Belgian Jesuit who lived in the seventeenth century. He was chosen because his life exhibited a loving practice of fidelity to God in day-to-day living and in ordinary things.

=== School seal ===
The School Seal is a modification of the family coat of arms of St. Ignatius Loyola, founder of the Jesuits. "Loyola" is derived from lobos y olla, "wolves and pot." Ignatius' coat of arms depicts a cauldron suspended by a chain between two wolves. The wolves symbolize hospitality of the Loyola family; legend has it that during a famine in the Basque country they fed the entire surrounding countryside, "even the wolves." The opposite side of the shield presents the bands of Ignatius' maternal family.

=== School colors ===
The School Colors are blue and Vegas gold and are hailed in both school songs, the Alma Mater and the fight song – blue for filial piety and gold for integrity.

== Schools ==
=== St. John's College ===
St. John's College was the original school, founded in downtown Toledo. When the school re-opened years after it closed during the Great Depression it re-opened as St. John's High School.

=== St. John's Jesuit High School ===
St. John's Jesuit High School
- FSJ
- Toledo, Ohio

Information
- Established: 1965; 61 years ago
- Principal: Leadership Team
- Grades: 9–12
- Enrollment: 600
- Athletics: CHSL (Catholic High School League)
- Yearbook: Promethean
- Television Station: SJTV4 (Titan 4 News)

The high school opened in 1965. It is an all male, college-prep high school with an enrollment of about 800. SJJ is one of two all-male Catholic high schools in the Toledo area, and one of six Catholic high schools.

==== Academics ====
To be enrolled in St. John's Jesuit, a student must pass the entrance exam. St. John's runs on a (4.0) GPA scale. Theology and English are compulsory for all four years of study, math and science, for three. St. John's is accredited by the North Central Association of Colleges and Schools, the Jesuit Secondary Education Association, and the Ohio Department of Education. St. John's offers a large number of honors classes which receive a 0.5 weight to their GPA. It also offers many Advanced Placement (AP) courses which receive a 1.0 weight and possible college credit.

In 2007, the St. John's Jesuit Quiz Bowl team won first place in the Toledo City League and the Northwest Ohio Regional Tournament. Recently in 2023, the Quiz bowl team again won first place in the Toledo City League and the Northwest Ohio Regional Tournament. This netted them an invitation to the NAQT national tournament in Atlanta, Georgia.

The Chess Team won back-to-back titles in the Greater Toledo Area High School Chess League in the 2010-2011 and 2011–2012 seasons. In addition, Evan Aubry won an individual national championship at the 2011 National High School Chess Championship.

==== House system ====
In the 2008-2009 year the "house" system was introduced to the high school with eight houses: each student is put into a house and the eight houses compete. There are "house days" with competition in things varying from basketball, to video games, to tug of war. Points are also rewarded for things like overall GPA, overall behavior, performance in sport and fun activities, and school spirit. At the end of the year a winning house is announced. The house system ended in 2016, and was replaced by the Student Life Office.

==== Performing arts ====
St. John's offers both instrumental and vocal music education as well as a theater program. The vocal program includes two ensembles, the Men's Chorus, a co-curricular ensemble, and the Vocal Ensemble. The instrumental program has three main co-curricular ensembles, the Marching Titans, the Symphonic Band, and the Wind Ensemble. The Instrumental Department has many other extra-curricular groups including the Jazz Ensemble and the Jazz Machine, a basketball pep band, hockey pep band, the Commencement Wind Ensemble and a pit orchestra for St. John's musicals. Each year the high school performs a musical at the Valentine Theater in downtown Toledo. In 2008, the program performed "Les Misérables" and was asked to reprise the show as a touring ensemble. In 2011, the program performed "Titanic" and in 2012 "Anything Goes". In 2013 the program showcased "Monty Python's Spamalot". A fall play is also performed annually by the Campion Hall Players inside the school's McQuade Theater. Productions have ranged from Shakespeare's "Twelfth Night" and "The Taming of the Shrew" to Miller's "The Crucible" and Bradbury's "Fahrenheit 451."

==== Athletics ====
Sports at St. John's include basketball, football, soccer, ice hockey, baseball, track and field, cross country, bowling, lacrosse, swimming, golf, tennis, and rowing.

The Titans won or shared the Toledo City League All Sports Trophy 29 times in 37 years – more than all other schools combined. Beginning in 2011 the Titans began competing in the Three Rivers Athletic Conference until 2023, when it joined the Michigan Catholic High School League after the TRAC folded

Other athletic accomplishments, including Ohio High School Athletic Association and Regional championships, and other sanctioned championships:

State Championships

- Golf: Ohio High School Athletic Association Champions - 1931, 1987, 1994
- Tennis Ohio Tennis Coaches' Association Champions - 1987, 2011
- Hockey[*] - Ohio High School Athletic Association Champions - 2007
- Track & Field Ohio High School Athletic Association Champions - 2023

[*]Won 1999 state title game 7-0, however later forfeited to Bowling Green High School due to the use of an ineligible player. The players retained their individual gold medals.

State Runner Up

- Tennis - 2010
- Cross Country - 2006
- Basketball - 1993, 1996, 2004

State Final Four

- Tennis - 2005, 2006, 2007, 2008, 2009, 2012
- Hockey - 1981, 1985, 1986, 1988, 1990, 1991, 1993, 1994, 1998, 2000, 2001, 2007, 2009
- Basketball - 1993, 1996, 2003, 2004, 2006, 2009, 2023
- Football - 2003
- Soccer - 2002, 2010, 2015
- Baseball - 2021
- Lacrosse - 2004, 2022, 2024

Other Athletic Accomplishments

- Rowing - 2006, Scholastic National Championship- Junior 8 (third place, bronze)
  - 2008 Scholastic National Championship - Varsity 4 (third place, bronze)
  - 2017 Scholastic National Championship - Junior Varsity 4 (third place, bronze)
- Swimming - 2008 Northwest District Champions
- Diving - David Colturi 2007 State Champion
- Track and Field - Regional Champions: 2007, 2008, 2025
  - Toledo City League Champions: 2007, 2008, 2009, 2011. TRAC Champions 2015, 2016

=== St. John's Jesuit Academy ===
St. John's Jesuit Academy
- SJJA
- Toledo, Ohio

Information
- Type: Private, all-male, middle school
- Established: 2004; 22 years ago
- Principal: Steve Spenthoff '95
- Faculty: 15
- Grades: 6–8
- Enrollment: 180

The academy was established in the 2004–2005 school year. The students can use all of the facilities of the college-prep high school but study primarily in their own private wing. Often, students take some of the requisite high-school courses in the academy before enrollment in the High School, enabling them to take more AP courses at the end of their high-school study. The academy has a budding sports, music, and art program. The students attend all Masses and Prayer Services with the High School. The students of the academy are paired with "Big Brothers" in the Senior High and often take part in activities with them. The academy offers advanced curricula in math, science, English, social studies and one foreign language consisting of Spanish, Latin, or Chinese.

==== Academy expansion ====
The academy has greatly expanded since its first year. The number of students and activities increased rapidly, and the space the academy administration offices and rooms occupied became crowded. The Jesuits moved out of their wing and the space was reconfigured for Academy use, in the summer of 2009.

==== Athletics ====
Athletics at the academy are extra-curricular and consist of cross country, football, basketball, track, lacrosse, and wrestling. Most teams participate in the local Catholic sports programs with other private seventh and eighth grades.

==== Music ====
Music at the academy is compulsory. Students can enroll in the Academy Beginners Band, the Academy Young Men's Chorus, or the standard music education course. Additionally, students can be placed in the Academy Advanced Band.

== Notable alumni ==
- Joey Akpunonu - 2020 - professional soccer player who has played for FC Cincinnati, Hartford Athletic and currently plays for Charleston Battery
- Most Rev. Karl Joseph Alter - Archbishop of Roman Catholic Archdiocese of Cincinnati, alumnus of St. John's College, the original school at St. John's Jesuit
- John Amaechi - 1990 - former NBA player
- Nick Anderson - editorial cartoonist - winner of the 2005 Pulitzer Prize for Editorial Cartooning
- Dave Butler (born 1987), former American football linebacker who played for the Cleveland Browns
- Rob Chudzinski - 1986 - NFL/NCAA football former player & coach - special assistant to the head coach of the NFL's Indianapolis Colts, former head coach of the NFL's Cleveland Browns
- Michael B. Coleman - 1972 - mayor of Columbus, Ohio
- Jalil Carter - 2007 - CB for the Minnesota Vikings
- Doug Ducey - 1982 - 23rd Governor of Arizona, former State Treasurer of Arizona, former chairman and CEO of Cold Stone Creamery and Kahala–Cold Stone which now owns the franchise
- Brandon Fields - 2002 - NFL punter drafted in 2007 by the Miami Dolphins; name enshrined on the Eddleman-Fields Punter of the Year award for best punter in the Big Ten
- Steve Hartman - 1981 - Emmy Award-winning broadcast journalist, CBS News
- Erick Iskersky - champion tennis player, ranked as high as #65 in the world in 1982
- Jay Larrañaga - head coach of the Irish national basketball team and an assistant coach for the Boston Celtics of the NBA
- Gary Louris - 1973 - singer and guitarist for The Jayhawks
- Jack Mewhort - 2009 - offensive lineman for the Indianapolis Colts
- Mike O'Brien - 1995 - former staff writer and featured player on Saturday Night Live
- Scott Parsons - 2001 - 2002 and 2003 US National Champion in K-1 Whitewater Slalom Kayak; 2003 Pan American Games silver medalist; 2004 US Olympic Trials champion
- Brogan Roback (born 1994), American football quarterback.
- Brian Roberts - 2004 - professional basketball player in the NBA formerly played for the Charlotte Hornets
- Michael D. Sallah - 1973 - Washington Post investigative reporter and winner of 2004 Pulitzer Prize for Investigative Reporting
- Vince Williams Jr. - 2018 - American professional basketball player for the Memphis Grizzlies of the National Basketball Association (NBA). He played college basketball for the VCU Rams.
