= Kent State Golden Flashes football statistical leaders =

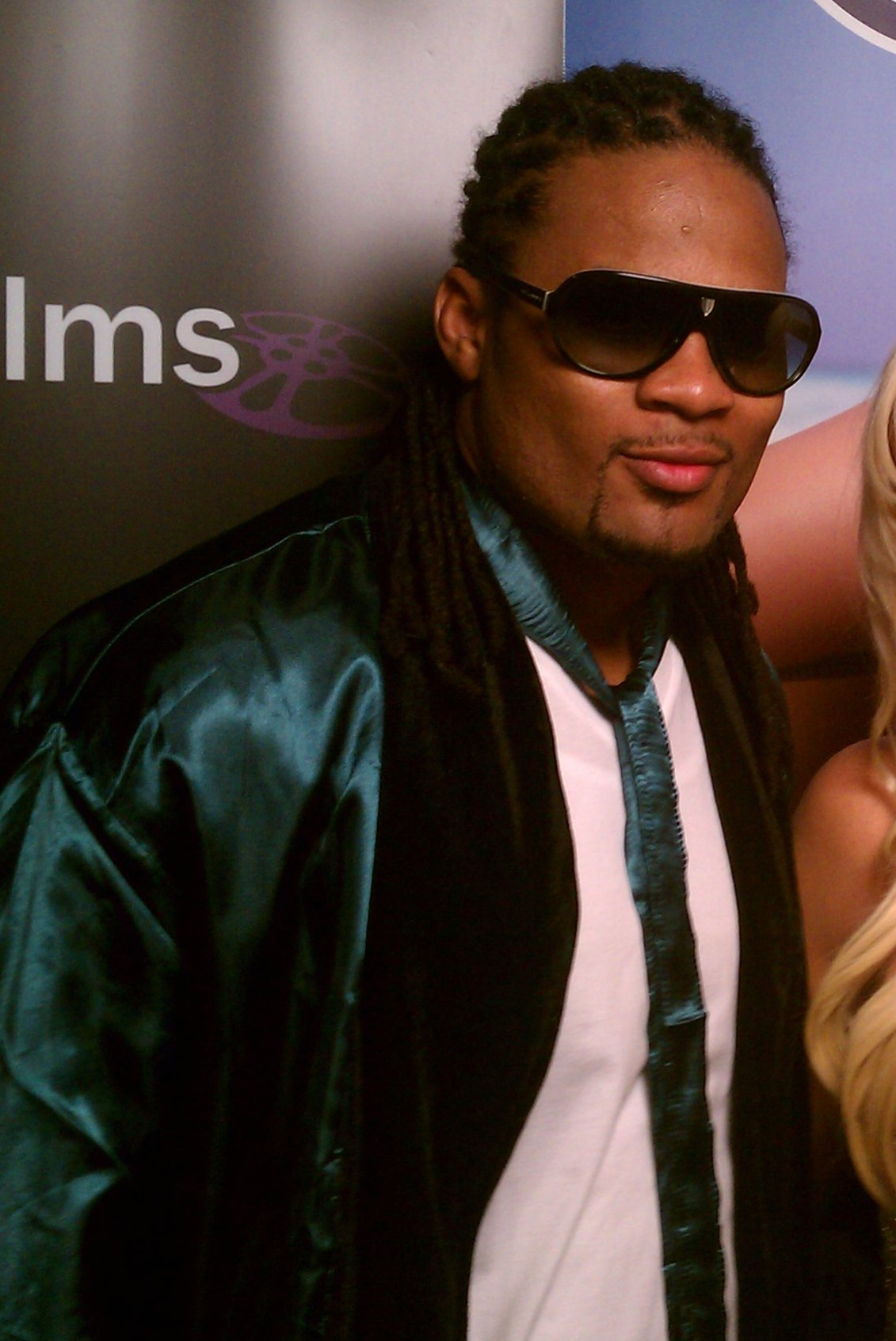
Josh Cribbs is Kent State's career leader in total offensive yards, appearing second on the passing yards list and fourth on the rushing yards list.

The Kent State Golden Flashes football statistical leaders are individual statistical leaders of the Kent State Golden Flashes football program in various categories, including passing, rushing, receiving, total offense, defensive stats, and kicking. Within those areas, the lists identify single-game, single-season, and career leaders. The Golden Flashes represent Kent State University in the NCAA's Mid-American Conference.

Although Kent State began competing in intercollegiate football in 1920, the school's official record book considers the "modern era" to have begun in 1946. Records from before this year are often incomplete and inconsistent, and they are generally not included in these lists.

These lists are dominated by more recent players for several reasons:

- Since 1946, seasons have increased from 10 games to 11 and then 12 games in length.
- The NCAA didn't allow freshmen to play varsity football until 1972 (with the exception of the World War II years), allowing players to have four-year careers.
- Bowl games only began counting toward single-season and career statistics in 2002. The Golden Flashes have only played in two bowl games since the decision—the 2013 GoDaddy.com Bowl after the 2012 season, and the 2019 Frisco Bowl.
- The 2012 team was also the only Kent State team to date to appear in the MAC Championship Game, providing yet another game for players to accumulate statistics.

These lists are updated through the end of the 2025 season.

== Passing ==
=== Passing yards ===
Career
Rk	Player	Yards	Years
1	Spencer Keith	8,062	2009 2010 2011 2012
2	Dustin Crum	7,449	2017 2018 2019 2020 2021
3	Josh Cribbs	7,169	2001 2002 2003 2004
4	Jose Davis	6,722	1997 1998 1999
5	Greg Kokal	5,587	1972 1973 1974 1975
6	Colin Reardon	5,324	2013 2014 2015
7	Julian Edelman	4,997	2006 2007 2008
8	Todd Goebbel	3,747	1995 1996 1997
9	Kevin Shuman	3,483	1991 1992 1993
10	Joe Dalpra	2,991	1988 1989 1990 1991

Single season
Rk	Player	Yards	Year
1	Dustin Crum	3,238	2021
2	Jose Davis	2,707	1997
3	Dustin Crum	2,622	2019
4	Colin Reardon	2,466	2014
5	Josh Cribbs	2,424	2003
6	Todd Goebbel	2,419	1996
7	Woody Barrett	2,339	2018
8	Josh Cribbs	2,215	2004
9	Spencer Keith	2,147	2009
10	Collin Schlee	2,109	2022

Single game
Rk	Player	Yards	Year	Opponent
1	Jose Davis	551	1997	UCF
2	Stu Rayborn	419	1983	Toledo
	Jose Davis	419	1997	Akron
4	Dustin Crum	407	2021	Buffalo
5	Collin Schlee	398	2022	Ohio
6	Tommy Ulatowski	394	2024	Ball State
7	Josh Cribbs	389	2004	UCF
8	Spencer Keith	377	2009	Akron
9	Spencer Keith	373	2009	Western Michigan
10	Kevin Shuman	371	1992	Bowling Green

=== Passing touchdowns ===
Career
Rk	Player	TDs	Years
1	Jose Davis	57	1997 1998 1999
2	Dustin Crum	55	2017 2018 2019 2020 2021
3	Josh Cribbs	45	2001 2002 2003 2004
	Spencer Keith	45	2009 2010 2011 2012
5	Colin Reardon	33	2013 2014 2015
6	Greg Kokal	30	1972 1973 1974 1975
	Julian Edelman	30	2006 2007 2008
8	Todd Goebbel	25	1995 1996 1997
9	Tommy Ulatowski	23	2022 2023 2024
10	Joe Dalpra	21	1988 1989 1990 1991

Single season
Rk	Player	TDs	Year
1	Jose Davis	32	1997
2	Dustin Crum	20	2019
	Dustin Crum	20	2021
4	Todd Goebbel	19	1996
5	Dru DeShields	18	2025
6	Josh Cribbs	17	2004
7	Jose Davis	16	1999
8	Tommy Ulatowski	15	2024
9	Josh Cribbs	14	2003
	Spencer Keith	14	2009
	Colin Reardon	14	2014

Single game
Rk	Player	TDs	Year	Opponent
1	Jose Davis	7	1997	Central Michigan
2	Jose Davis	6	1997	UCF
3	Jose Davis	5	1997	Akron
	Josh Cribbs	5	2004	UCF
	Dru DeShields	5	2025	Akron
6	Greg Kokal	4	1974	Akron
	Stu Rayborn	4	1983	Toledo
	Kevin Shuman	4	1991	Ohio
	Jose Davis	4	1997	Bowling Green
	Jose Davis	4	1999	Buffalo
	Dustin Crum	4	2019	Ohio
	Dustin Crum	4	2020	Bowling Green
	Dustin Crum	4	2021	Wyoming
	Tommy Ulatowski	4	2024	Ball State
	Dru DeShields	4	2025	Massachusetts
	Dru DeShields	4	2026	Akron

== Rushing ==
=== Rushing yards ===
Career
Rk	Player	Yards	Years
1	Astron Whatley	3,989	1994 1995 1996 1997
2	Eric Wilkerson	3,830	1985 1986 1987 1988
3	Eugene Jarvis	3,721	2006 2007 2008 2009 2010
4	Josh Cribbs	3,670	2001 2002 2003 2004
5	Trayion Durham	3,140	2011 2012 2013 2015
6	Marquez Cooper	2,818	2020 2021 2022
7	Larry Poole	2,668	1972 1973 1974
8	Don Nottingham	2,515	1972 1973 1974
9	Julian Edelman	2,483	2006 2007 2008
10	Dri Archer	2,342	2009 2010 2012 2013

Single season
Rk	Player	Yards	Year
1	Eugene Jarvis	1,669	2007
2	Dri Archer	1,482	2012
3	Julian Edelman	1,370	2008
4	Trayion Durham	1,346	2012
5	Marquez Cooper	1,331	2022
6	Eric Wilkerson	1,325	1988
7	Don Fitzgerald	1,245	1966
8	Eric Wilkerson	1,221	1987
9	Marquez Cooper	1,205	2021
10	Astron Whatley	1,132	1996

Single game
Rk	Player	Yards	Year	Opponent
1	Astron Whatley	373	1997	Eastern Michigan
2	Don Nottingham	275	1970	Dayton
3	Charles Chatman	257	1997	Central Michigan
4	Phil Witherspoon	242	1969	Louisville
5	Dri Archer	241	2012	Bowling Green
6	Marquez Cooper	240	2022	Ohio
7	Eugene Jarvis	230	2007	Ohio
8	Lou Mariano	226	1954	Western Reserve
9	Nick Holley	224	2016	Buffalo
10	Josh Cribbs	223	2005	Ohio

=== Rushing touchdowns ===
Career
Rk	Player	TDs	Years
1	Josh Cribbs	38	2001 2002 2003 2004
2	Larry Poole	36	1972 1973 1974
	Eric Wilkerson	36	1985 1986 1987 1988
4	Michael Norcia	29	1952 1953 1954 1955
	Marquez Cooper	29	2020 2021 2022
6	Jack Mancos	28	1949 1950 1951
7	Trayion Durham	27	2011 2012 2013 2015
8	Eugene Jarvis	26	2006 2007 2008 2009 2010
9	Astron Whatley	25	1994 1995 1996 1997
10	Lou Mariano	25	1951 1952 1953 1954

Single season
Rk	Player	TDs	Year
1	Larry Poole	18	1973
2	Dri Archer	16	2012
3	Lou Mariano	14	1954
	Eric Wilkerson	14	1988
	Josh Cribbs	14	2003
	Trayion Durham	14	2012
7	Jack Mancos	13	1951
	Larry Poole	13	1974
	Julian Edelman	13	2008
	Marquez Cooper	13	2022

Single game
Rk	Player	TDs	Year	Opponent
1	Carmen Falcone	4	1938	Buffalo
	Art Best	4	1976	Northern Illinois
	Astron Whatley	4	1994	Akron
	Josh Cribbs	4	2003	Ohio
	David Alston	4	2004	Buffalo
	Eugene Jarvis	4	2008	Miami (Ohio)
	Nick Holley	4	2016	Buffalo

== Receiving ==
=== Receptions ===
Career
Rk	Player	Rec	Years
1	Eugene Baker	229	1995 1996 1997 1998
2	Tyshon Goode	181	2009 2010 2011 2013
3	Darrell Dowery Jr.	152	2001 2002 2003 2004
4	Dante Cephas	145	2019 2020 2021 2022
5	Jurron Kelly	143	1998 1999 2000 2001
6	Chris Humphrey	128	2011 2012 2013 2014
7	Isaiah McKoy	124	2018 2019 2020
8	Kim Featsent	118	1974 1975 1976 1977
9	Najah Pruden	113	2003 2004 2005 2006
	Sam Kirkland	113	2008 2009 2010 2011

Single season
Rk	Player	Rec	Year
1	Eugene Baker	103	1997
2	Dante Cephas	82	2021
3	Brian Dusho	72	1993
4	Eugene Baker	69	1996
5	Darrell Dowery Jr.	68	2004
6	Tyshon Goode	59	2010
7	Devontez Walker	58	2022
8	Isaiah McKoy	57	2019
9	Sam Kirkland	56	2010
10	Nykeim Johnson	55	2021

Single game
Rk	Player	Rec	Year	Opponent
1	Eugene Baker	15	1997	UCF
	Eugene Baker	15	1997	Akron
	Eugene Baker	15	1997	Navy
4	Eugene Baker	14	1996	Western Michigan
	Darrell Dowery Jr.	14	2004	Rutgers
6	Eugene Baker	13	1998	Navy
	Darrell Dowery Jr.	13	2004	UCF
	Dante Cephas	13	2021	Buffalo
	Dante Cephas	13	2022	Ohio
	Ja'Shaun Poke	13	2022	Ball State

=== Receiving yards ===
Career
Rk	Player	Yards	Years
1	Eugene Baker	3,513	1995 1996 1997 1998
2	Tyshon Goode	2,272	2009 2010 2011 2013
3	Dante Cephas	2,139	2019 2020 2021 2022
4	Najah Pruden	2,131	2003 2004 2005 2006
5	Darrell Dowery Jr.	1,931	2001 2002 2003 2004
6	Isaiah McKoy	1,748	2018 2019 2020
7	Jurron Kelly	1,703	1998 1999 2000 2001
8	Todd Feldman	1,663	1981 1982 1983 1984
9	Kim Featsent	1,662	1974 1975 1976 1977
10	Chris Humphrey	1,567	2011 2012 2013 2014

Single season
Rk	Player	Yards	Year
1	Eugene Baker	1,549	1997
2	Dante Cephas	1,240	2021
3	Eugene Baker	1,215	1996
4	Devontez Walker	921	2022
5	Brian Dusho	890	1993
6	Isaiah McKoy	870	2019
7	Najah Pruden	808	2006
8	James Kilbane	806	1985
9	Darrell Dowery Jr.	783	2003
10	Tyshon Goode	755	2009

Single game
Rk	Player	Yards	Year	Opponent
1	Dante Cephas	246	2022	Ohio
2	Eugene Baker	243	1996	Western Michigan
3	Darrell Dowery Jr.	240	2004	UCF
4	Eugene Baker	238	1997	UCF
5	Eugene Baker	236	1997	Akron
6	Eugene Baker	227	1998	Navy
7	Chrishon McCray	213	2024	Ball State
8	Eric Dye	203	1987	Central Michigan
9	Ken Hughes	201	1983	Toledo
10	Najah Pruden	200	2005	Ohio

=== Receiving touchdowns ===
Career
Rk	Player	TDs	Years
1	Eugene Baker	35	1995 1996 1997 1998
2	Isaiah McKoy	16	2018 2019 2020
3	Najah Pruden	15	2003 2004 2005 2006
4	Tyshon Goode	14	2009 2010 2011 2013
5	Shawn Barnes	13	1989 1990 1991
	Jason Gavadza	13	1996 1997 1998 1999
	Chrishon McCray	13	2023 2024
8	Jurron Kelly	12	1998 1999 2000 2001
	Dri Archer	12	2009 2010 2012 2013
	Mike Carrigan	12	2016 2017 2018 2019
	Dante Cephas	12	2019 2020 2021 2022
	Devontez Walker	12	2021 2022
	Luke Floriea	12	2020 2021 2022 2023 2024

Single season
Rk	Player	TDs	Year
1	Eugene Baker	18	1997
2	Eugene Baker	13	1996
3	Devontez Walker	11	2022
4	Dante Cephas	9	2021
	Chrishon McCray	9	2024
6	Isaiah McKoy	8	2019
7	Jim Betteker	7	1950
	Jason Gavadza	7	1999
	Luke Floriea	7	2024
	Cade Wolford	7	2025

Single game
Rk	Player	TDs	Year	Opponent
1	Eugene Baker	4	1987	Central Michigan
	Eugene Baker	4	1997	Akron
3	Jack Mancos	3	1951	Western Michigan
	Ken Dooner	3	1974	Akron
	Ken Hughes	3	1983	Toledo
	Eugene Baker	3	1996	Central Michigan
	Eugene Baker	3	1997	Bowling Green
	Isaiah McKoy	3	2019	Ball State
	Dante Cephas	3	2021	Buffalo
	Chrishon McCray	3	2024	Ball State
	Wayne Harris	3	2026	Akron

== Total offense ==
Total offense is the sum of passing and rushing statistics. It does not include receiving or returns.

=== Total offense yards ===
Career
Rk	Player	Yards	Years
1	Josh Cribbs	10,839	2001 2002 2003 2004
2	Dustin Crum	9,520	2017 2018 2019 2020 2021
3	Spencer Keith	8,409	2009 2010 2011 2012
4	Jose Davis	7,576	1997 1998 1999
5	Julian Edelman	7,480	2006 2007 2008
6	Greg Kokal	6,238	1972 1973 1974 1975
7	Astron Whatley	4,061	1994 1995 1996 1997
8	Todd Goebbel	3,993	1995 1996 1997
9	Eric Wilkerson	3,864	1985 1986 1987 1988
10	Kevin Shuman	3,796	1991 1992 1993

Single season
Rk	Player	Yards	Year
1	Dustin Crum	3,941	2021
2	Dustin Crum	3,329	2019
3	Julian Edelman	3,190	2008
4	Josh Cribbs	3,125	2003
5	Josh Cribbs	3,108	2004
6	Jose Davis	2,883	1997
7	Colin Reardon	2,614	2014
8	Collin Schlee	2,601	2022
9	Josh Cribbs	2,535	2001
10	Julian Edelman	2,517	2006

Single game
Rk	Player	Yards	Year	Opponent
1	Jose Davis	534	1997	UCF
2	Dustin Crum	479	2021	Buffalo
3	Collin Schlee	475	2022	Ohio
4	Jose Davis	474	1997	Akron
5	Dustin Crum	470	2019	Ball State
6	Dustin Crum	452	2020	Akron
7	Josh Cribbs	444	2004	UCF
8	Dustin Crum	436	2019	Utah State (Frisco Bowl)
9	Josh Cribbs	435	2003	Bowling Green
10	Dustin Crum	419	2020	Buffalo

=== Touchdowns responsible for ===
"Touchdowns responsible for" is the NCAA's official term for combined passing and rushing touchdowns.

Career
Rk	Player	TDs	Years
1	Josh Cribbs	83	2001 2002 2003 2004
2	Dustin Crum	79	2017 2018 2019 2020 2021
3	Jose Davis	68	1997 1998 1999
4	Spencer Keith	57	2009 2010 2011 2012
5	Julian Edelman	52	2006 2007 2008
6	Eric Wilkerson	38	1985 1986 1987 1988
7	Colin Reardon	37	2013 2014 2015
8	Greg Kokal	37	1972 1973 1974 1975
9	Larry Poole	36	1972 1973 1974
10	Todd Goebbel	34	1995 1996 1997

Single season
Rk	Player	TDs	Year
1	Jose Davis	35	1997
2	Dustin Crum	32	2021
3	Josh Cribbs	28	2003
4	Josh Cribbs	26	2004
	Julian Edelman	26	2008
	Dustin Crum	26	2019
7	Todd Goebbel	24	1996
8	Dru DeShields	21	2025
9	Jose Davis	20	1999
10	Larry Poole	18	1973

== Defense ==
=== Interceptions ===
Career
Rk	Player	Ints	Years
1	Lou Harris	19	1965 1966 1967
2	Brian Lainhart	17	2007 2008 2009 2010
3	Cedric Brown	16	1972 1973 1974 1975
4	Pat Gucciardo	13	1963 1964 1965
	Tom McDonald	13	1969 1970 1971
	Jack Williams	13	2004 2005 2006 2007
7	Jamie Howell	12	1985 1986 1987 1988
	Luke Wollet	12	2010 2011 2012 2013
	Demetrius Monday	12	2014 2015 2016 2017
10	Andy Logan	11	1985 1986 1987 1988

Single season
Rk	Player	Ints	Year
1	Cedric Brown	8	1975
	Andrew Logan	8	1988
3	Lou Harris	7	1966
	Brian Lainhart	7	2009
5	Lou Harris	6	1967
	Charles Grandjean	6	1981
	Brian Lainhart	6	2008
	Demetrius Monday	6	2015

Single game
Rk	Player	Ints	Year	Opponent
1	Charles Kilbourne	5	1930	Capital
2	Lou Harris	3	1965	Louisville
	Cedric Brown	3	1975	Toledo
	Jamie Howell	3	1988	WMU
	Andy Logan	3	1988	Bowling Green
	Brian Lainhart	3	2008	Akron
	Montre Miller	3	2021	VMI

=== Tackles ===
Career
Rk	Player	Tackles	Years
1	Jack Lazor	645	1975 1976 1977 1978
2	Jack Lambert	593	1971 1972 1973
3	Russ Hedderly	548	1980 1981 1982 1983
4	Robert Wallace	534	1976 1977 1978 1979
5	Mike Zele	519	1975 1976 1977 1978
6	Sean Patterson	472	1990 1991 1992 1993
7	Paul Haynes	440	1987 1988 1989 1990 1991
8	Nate Holley	424	2013 2014 2015 2016
9	Tony Stephens	421	1984 1985 1986 1987
10	Tim Viscuso	417	1984 1985 1986 1987

Single season
Rk	Player	Tackles	Year
1	Jack Lambert	233	1972
2	Jack Lambert	205	1973
	Jack Lazor	205	1978
4	Jack Lazor	197	1977
5	Russell Hedderly	191	1981
6	Robert Wallace	187	1978
7	Robert Wallace	182	1979
8	Russell Hedderly	177	1980
9	Mike Zele	175	1978
10	Gerry King	174	1958
	John Massimiami	174	1989

Single game
Rk	Player	Tackles	Year	Opponent
1	Jack Lambert	29	1972	Toledo
2	Bob Wallace	28	1978	Air Force
3	Jack Lazor	27	1977	Miami (Ohio)
4	Russ Hedderly	25	1981	Miami (Ohio)
5	Jim Corrigall	24	1969	Western Michigan
	Russ Hedderly	24	1981	Central Michigan
	Roger Terry	24	1996	Ohio
8	Jack Lazor	23	1975	Miami (Ohio)

=== Sacks ===
Career
Rk	Player	Sacks	Years
1	Justin Parrish	25.0	2002 2003 2004 2005
2	Roosevelt Nix	24.0	2010 2011 2012 2013
3	Kevin Hogan	22.0	2006 2007 2008 2009
4	Monte Simmons	21.5	2007 2008 2009 2010
5	Terrence Waugh	20.0	2013 2014 2015 2016
6	Andy Harmon	18.0	1987 1988 1989 1990
7	Jake Dooley	15.5	2009 2010 2011 2012
8	James Harrison	15.0	1999 2000 2001
	Daniel Muir	15.0	2003 2004 2005 2006
10	Theo Majette	14.5	2016 2017 2018 2019

Single season
Rk	Player	Sacks	Year
1	Justin Parrish	14.0	2004
2	James Harrison	12.0	2001
3	Roosevelt Nix	10.0	2010
4	Andy Harmon	9.0	1990
	Terence Waugh	9.0	2015
6	Justin Parrish	8.5	2005
7	Monte Simmons	8.0	2009
	Terence Waugh	8.0	2016
9	Kevin Hogan	7.5	2006
	Saivon Taylor-Davis	7.5	2022

Single game
Rk	Player	Sacks	Year	Opponent
1	James Harrison	5.0	2001	Miami (Ohio)
2	Bob Wallace	4.0	1977	Ohio
3	Gerald Washington	3.5	1994	Ohio
	Roosevelt Nix	3.5	2010	Akron

== Kicking ==
=== Field goals made ===
Career
Rk	Player	FGs	Years
1	Freddy Cortez	56	2009 2010 2011 2012
2	Andrew Glass	55	2021 2022 2023 2024
3	Matthew Trickett	47	2018 2019 2020
4	Travis Mayle	42	2002 2003 2004 2005
5	Paul Marchese	35	1975 1976 1977
	Dave Pavich	35	1998 1999 2000 2001
7	Shane Hynes	31	2015 2016 2017
8	Nate Reed	27	2006 2007 2008 2009
9	Lou Carraci	19	1978 1981 1982
	Anthony Melchiori	19	2012 2013 2014 2015

Single season
Rk	Player	FGs	Year
1	Matthew Trickett	29	2019
2	Andrew Glass	21	2021
3	Freddy Cortez	19	2012
4	Paul Marchese	18	1977
	Nate Reed	18	2007
6	Andrew Glass	17	2022
7	Paul Marchese	16	1976
	Travis Mayle	16	2003
9	Shane Hynes	15	2016
	Andrew Glass	15	2023

Single game
Rk	Player	FGs	Year	Opponent
1	Matthew Trickett	5	2019	Utah State (Frisco Bowl)
2	Gordon Ober	4	1970	Western Michigan
	Nate Reed	4	2007	Ohio
	Matthew Trickett	4	2018	Ohio
	Matthew Trickett	4	2019	Kennesaw State
	Matthew Trickett	4	2019	Akron

=== Field goal percentage ===
Career
Rk	Player	FG%	Years
1	Matthew Trickett	82.5%	2018 2019 2020
2	Andrew Glass	73.3%	2021 2022 2023 2024
3	Dave Pavich	72.9%	1998 1999 2000 2001
4	Freddy Cortez	71.8%	2009 2010 2011 2012
5	Travis Mayle	67.7%	2002 2003 2004 2005

Single season
Rk	Player	FG%	Year
1	Andrew Glass	88.2%	2023
2	Matthew Trickett	85.3%	2019
3	Matthew Trickett	82.4%	2018
4	Dave Pavich	81.3%	1999
5	Freddy Cortez	76.5%	2011
6	Freddy Cortez	76.0%	2012
7	Nate Reed	75.0%	2007
	Andrew Glass	75.0%	2021
