= List of Kent State Golden Flashes in the NFL draft =

This is a list of Kent State Golden Flashes football players in the NFL draft.

== Key ==
B	Back	K	Kicker	NT	Nose tackle
C	Center	LB	Linebacker	FB	Fullback
DB	Defensive back	P	Punter	HB	Halfback
DE	Defensive end	QB	Quarterback	WR	Wide receiver
DT	Defensive tackle	RB	Running back	G	Guard
E	End	T	Offensive tackle	TE	Tight end

== Selections ==
Year	Round	Pick	Player	Team	Position
1954	16	182	Al Kilgore	Chicago Cardinals	T
1954	16	192	Rich Raidel	Cleveland Browns	G
1956	13	156	Mike Norcia	Los Angeles Rams	B
1957	3	32	Luke Owens	Baltimore Colts	T
1959	11	130	Jerry King	Cleveland Browns	G
1960	12	141	Rich Mostardi	Cleveland Browns	B
1964	15	209	Alex Zerko	Green Bay Packers	T
1966	4	64	Willie Asbury	Atlanta Falcons	RB
1967	2	44	John Brooks	Philadelphia Eagles	G
1967	9	233	Gerald Seither	Buffalo Bills	WR
1967	12	292	Ernie Ames	Buffalo Bills	DT
1967	14	344	Charles Stikes	Miami Dolphins	DB
1968	4	87	Don Fitzgerald	St. Louis Cardinals	RB
1968	5	129	Bill Perry	San Diego Chargers	TE
1968	13	350	Howard Tennebar	Baltimore Colts	T
1968	14	363	Lou Harris	Pittsburgh Steelers	DE
1969	17	420	Bill Eppright	Pittsburgh Steelers	K
1970	2	33	Jim Corrigall	St. Louis Cardinals	LB
1971	17	441	Don Nottingham	Baltimore Colts	RB
1974	2	44	Gerald Tinker	Atlanta Falcons	WR
1974	2	46	Jack Lambert	Pittsburgh Steelers	LB
1975	9	213	Larry Poole	Cleveland Browns	RB
1976	7	188	Abdul Salaam	New York Jets	DE
1976	11	294	Greg Kokal	New Orleans Saints	QB
1976	11	297	Chuck Celek	Cleveland Browns	DE
1976	12	343	Cedric Brown	Oakland Raiders	DB
1977	6	156	Art Best	Los Angeles Rams	RB
1978	12	323	Kim Featsent	Cincinnati Bengals	WR
1979	5	127	Mike Zele	Atlanta Falcons	DT
1989	11	288	Bert Weidner	Miami Dolphins	DT
1991	6	156	Andy Harmon	Philadelphia Eagles	DE
1997	3	70	O. J. Santiago	Atlanta Falcons	TE
1998	2	53	Bob Hallen	Atlanta Falcons	G
1999	5	164	Eugene Baker	Atlanta Falcons	WR
2000	6	204	Jason Gavadza	Pittsburgh Steelers	TE
2007	3	66	Usama Young	New Orleans Saints	DB
2008	4	119	Jack Williams	Denver Broncos	DB
2009	7	232	Julian Edelman	New England Patriots	WR
2010	7	245	Jameson Konz	Seattle Seahawks	TE
2013	3	72	Brian Winters	New York Jets	G
2014	3	97	Dri Archer	Pittsburgh Steelers	RB
