= Don Fitzgerald =

Profile
- Position: Fullback

Personal information
- Born: July 16, 1946 (age 80); Sewickley, Pennsylvania, U.S.
- Listed height: 5 ft 11 in (1.80 m)
- Listed weight: 210 lb (95 kg)

Career information
- High school: Ambridge (PA)
- College: Kent State (1965–1967)

Career history
- St. Louis Cardinals (1968)*; Philadelphia Eagles (1968)*; Atlanta Falcons (1968)*; Alabama Hawks (1968–1969); Jersey Jays (1970); Bridgeport Jets (1971)
- * Offseason or practice squad member only

Don Fitzgerald (born July 16, 1946), also known as "Human Hammer" and "Fitz the Blitz", is a former American football fullback. He played college football for Kent State from 1965 to 1967. As a junior in 1966, he ranked second nationally among major-college players with 1,245 rushing yards. As a senior, he was slowed by an injury but still gained 891 yards. Over his three years at Kent State, he tallied 2,231 rushing yards and scored 14 touchdowns. He set an NCAA record in 1966 with 47 carries in a single game. He was a consensus first-team pick for the All-MAC team in both 1966 and 1967.

Fitzgerald was drafted by the St. Louis Cardinals in the fourth round (87th overall pick) of the 1968 NFL draft. He was with the Cardinals during traing camp but was traded to the Philadelphia Eagles in August 1968. He was then acquired by the Atlanta Falcons who listed him on their taxi squad in 1968, but assigned him, subject to recall, to the Alabama Hawks of the Continental Football League. He played for Alabama in 1968 and 1969, the Jersey Jays of the Atlantic Coast Football League (ACFL) in 1970, and the Bridgeport Jets of the ACFL in 1971.

Fitzgerald was inducted into the Kent State Athletic Hall of Fame in 1984.

== See also ==
- Kent State Golden Flashes football statistical leaders#Rushing
