= Venice High School =

Venice High School may refer to:

- Venice High School (Los Angeles)
- Venice High School (Venice, Florida)
