= Larry Poole =

Larry Poole may refer to:

- Larry Poole (American football)
- Larry Poole (actor)
