= 1973 Bowling Green Falcons football team =

American college football season

1973 Bowling Green Falcons football
- Conference: Mid-American Conference
- Record: 7–3 (2–3 MAC)
- Head coach: Don Nehlen (6th season)
- Home stadium: Doyt Perry Stadium

1973 Mid-American Conference football standings
	Conf.					Overall
Team	W		L		T	W		L		T
No. 15 Miami (OH) $	5	–	0	–	0	11	–	0	–	0
Kent State	4	–	1	–	0	9	–	2	–	0
Bowling Green	2	–	3	–	0	7	–	3	–	0
Ohio	2	–	3	–	0	5	–	5	–	0
Western Michigan	1	–	4	–	0	6	–	5	–	0
Toledo	1	–	4	–	0	3	–	8	–	0
$ – Conference champion; Rankings from AP Poll

The 1973 Bowling Green Falcons football team was an American football team that represented Bowling Green University in the Mid-American Conference (MAC) during the 1973 NCAA Division I football season. In their sixth season under head coach Don Nehlen, the Falcons compiled a 7–3 record (2–3 against MAC opponents), finished in a tie for third place in the MAC, and outscored their opponents by a combined total of 266 to 209.

The team's statistical leaders included Reid Lamport with 1,084 passing yards, Paul Miles with 1,030 rushing yards, and Roger Wallace with 587 receiving yards.

== Schedule ==
Date	Time	Opponent	Rank	Site	Result	Attendance	Source
September 15	1:30 p.m.	at Syracuse*		Archbold Stadium; Syracuse, NY	W 41–14	18,254	
September 22	7:30 p.m.	at Dayton*	No. T–20	Baujan Field; Dayton, OH	W 31–16	11,762	
September 29	1:30 p.m.	Western Michigan		Doyt Perry Stadium; Bowling Green, OH	W 31–20	14,231	
October 6	1:30 p.m.	Toledo		Doyt Perry Stadium; Bowling Green, OH (rivalry)	W 49–35	22,684	
October 13	1:30 p.m.	at Kent State		Dix Stadium; Kent, OH (rivalry)	L 7–21	25,137	
October 20	1:30 p.m.	No. 20 Miami (OH)		Doyt Perry Stadium; Bowling Green, OH	L 8–31	22,160	
October 27	1:30 p.m.	at Marshall*		Fairfield Stadium; Huntington, WV	W 24–21	14,900	
November 3	1:30 p.m.	at Ohio		Peden Stadium; Athens, OH	L 23–24	12,200	
November 10	1:30 p.m.	Eastern Michigan*		Doyt Perry Stadium; Bowling Green, OH	W 31–7	14,216–14,219	
November 17	1:30 p.m.	Northern Illinois*		Doyt Perry Stadium; Bowling Green, OH	W 21–20	12,696	
*Non-conference game; Rankings from AP Poll released prior to the game; All times are in Eastern time

== Roster ==
1973 Bowling Green Falcons football team roster
Players
Coaches
Offense

Pos.	#	Name	Class
G	60	Gary Anderson	So
RB	9	Dave Preston	Fr
WR	84	Roger Wallace	Sr

Defense

Pos.	#	Name	Class
DT	57	Tom Hall	Sr
LB	41	John Villapiano	Sr

Special teams

Pos.	#	Name	Class

Head coach

- Don Nehlen

Coordinators/assistant coaches

Legend

- (C) Team captain
- (S) Suspended
- (I) Ineligible
- Injured
- Redshirt
