= Forrest Lamp =

American football player (born 1994)

No. 77, 76, 66
- Position: Guard

Personal information
- Born: February 20, 1994 (age 32); Venice, Florida, U.S.
- Listed height: 6 ft 4 in (1.93 m)
- Listed weight: 310 lb (141 kg)

Career information
- High school: Venice
- College: Western Kentucky (2012–2016)
- NFL draft: 2017: 2nd round, 38th overall pick

Career history
- Los Angeles Chargers (2017–2020); Buffalo Bills (2021)*; New Orleans Saints (2021–2022)
- * Offseason or practice squad member only

Career NFL statistics
- Games played: 26
- Games started: 18
- Stats at Pro Football Reference

Forrest Noah Lamp (born February 20, 1994) is an American former professional football player who was a guard in the National Football League (NFL). He played college football for the Western Kentucky Hilltoppers and was selected by the Los Angeles Chargers in the second round of the 2017 NFL draft, and also played in the NFL for the New Orleans Saints.

Following his career, he became a sports agent.

== Early life ==
Lamp attended Venice High School in Venice, Florida. He played both offensive and defensive line. A two-star offensive tackle recruit, Lamp committed to Western Kentucky University to play college football.

== College career ==
Lamp redshirted his first year at Western Kentucky in 2012. He opened the season as the starter at right guard, before shifting to left tackle for the final nine games. Lamp remained the starting left tackle throughout his college career, starting 51 games total in his career.

== Professional career ==
=== Pre-draft ===
Lamp received an invitation to the Senior Bowl and had his stock quickly rise after a solid week of practice. He injured his ankle and was unable to play in the game. Although he played offensive tackle throughout his collegiate career, many teams speculated a switch to guard in the NFL due to his lack of arm length. He also attended the NFL Combine and completed all of the combine drills.

External videos
- Forrest Lamp's NFL Combine Workout
- Forrest Lamp runs the 40-yard dash

At Western Kentucky's Pro Day, Lamp opted to only run positional drills and stood on his combine performance. NFL draft experts and analysts projected Lamp to be selected in the first round. He was ranked the top guard in the draft by NFLDraftScout.com and Pro Football Focus, the top offensive lineman by ESPN, the top interior offensive lineman by NFL media analysts Mike Mayock and Bucky Brooks, and the third best offensive tackle by Sports Illustrated.

Pre-draft measurables
Height	Weight	Arm length	Hand span	40-yard dash	10-yard split	20-yard split	20-yard shuttle	Three-cone drill	Vertical jump	Broad jump	Bench press
6 ft 3 5/8 in (1.92 m)	309 lb (140 kg)	32 1/4 in (0.82 m)	10 5/8 in (0.27 m)	5.00 s	1.75 s	2.91 s	4.62 s	7.55 s	27 1/2 in (0.70 m)	9 ft 3 in (2.82 m)	34 reps
All values from NFL Combine

=== Los Angeles Chargers ===
The Los Angeles Chargers selected Lamp in the second round (38th overall) of the 2017 NFL draft. Lamp was the first offensive guard drafted in 2017.

External videos
- Chargers draft Forrest Lamp 38th overall
- NFL Draft Profile: Forrest Lamp
- Mayock "Lamp will make an impact"

On May 11, the Chargers signed Lamp to a four-year, $6.66 million contract with $3.75 million guaranteed and a signing bonus of $2.98 million. On August 2, 2017, Lamp suffered a torn ACL during training camp, and was ruled out for his entire rookie season. He was officially placed on injured reserve on September 2, 2017.

On May 15, 2018, Lamp underwent a minor knee procedure, described as a routine cleanup. He entered 2018 as a backup guard to starters Dan Feeney and Michael Schofield. He only played in two games, and was a healthy scratch for much of the season.

In 2019, Lamp played in seven games with two starts before suffering a broken fibula. He was placed on injured reserve on October 23, 2019.

Lamp started all 16 games at left guard for the Chargers in 2020, leading the league with 1,174 total snaps.

=== Buffalo Bills ===
Lamp signed with the Buffalo Bills on April 15, 2021. He was placed on injured reserve on August 23, 2021, and released two days later.

=== New Orleans Saints ===
On October 19, 2021, Lamp was signed to the practice squad of the New Orleans Saints. He re-signed with the Saints on April 1, 2022. He was placed on injured reserve on August 19, and was released on October 25.

== Post-playing career ==
After his playing days ended, Lamp became an agent for Roc Nation Sports. He co-represented Will Campbell when he was the fourth-overall pick in the 2025 NFL draft.
