= 1973 Marshall Thundering Herd football team =

American college football season

1973 Marshall Thundering Herd football
- Conference: Independent
- Record: 4–7
- Head coach: Jack Lengyel (3rd season)
- Captain: Jack Crabtree
- Home stadium: Fairfield Stadium

1973 NCAA Division I independents football records
	Conf.			Overall
Team	W	L	T	W		L		T
No. 1 Notre Dame		–		11	–	0	–	0
No. 5 Penn State		–		12	–	0	–	0
No. 9 Houston		–		11	–	1	–	0
Temple		–		9	–	1	–	0
No. 20 Tulane		–		9	–	3	–	0
Memphis State		–		8	–	3	–	0
Tampa		–		8	–	3	–	0
Boston College		–		7	–	4	–	0
South Carolina		–		7	–	4	–	0
Utah State		–		7	–	4	–	0
Air Force		–		6	–	4	–	0
Southern Miss		–		6	–	4	–	1
Northern Illinois		–		6	–	5	–	0
Rutgers		–		6	–	5	–	0
West Virginia		–		6	–	5	–	0
Pittsburgh		–		6	–	5	–	1
Colgate		–		5	–	5	–	0
Dayton		–		5	–	5	–	1
Xavier		–		5	–	5	–	1
Georgia Tech		–		5	–	6	–	0
Holy Cross		–		5	–	6	–	0
Miami (FL)		–		5	–	6	–	0
Cincinnati		–		4	–	7	–	0
Marshall		–		4	–	7	–	0
Navy		–		4	–	7	–	0
Southern Illinois		–		3	–	7	–	1
Villanova		–		3	–	8	–	0
Syracuse		–		2	–	9	–	0
Virginia Tech		–		2	–	9	–	0
Army		–		0	–	10	–	0
Florida State		–		0	–	11	–	0
Rankings from AP Poll

The 1973 Marshall Thundering Herd football team was an American football team that represented Marshall University as an independent during the 1973 NCAA Division I football season. In its third season under head coach Jack Lengyel, the team compiled a 4–7 record and was outscored by a total of 288 to 212. The team played its home games at Fairfield Stadium in Huntington, West Virginia.

== Schedule ==
Date	Time	Opponent	Site	Result	Attendance	Source
September 15	7:35 p.m.	Morehead State	Fairfield Stadium; Huntington, WV	W 24–17	16,500	
September 21	11:15 p.m.	at UNLV	Las Vegas Stadium; Whitney, NV	L 9–31	9,186	
September 29	7:30 p.m.	Xavier	Fairfield Stadium; Huntington, WV	L 28–30	13,500	
October 6	1:30 p.m.	at Miami (OH)	Miami Field; Oxford, OH	L 6–31	10,200	
October 13	2:30 p.m.	at Northern Illinois	Huskie Stadium; DeKalb, IL	W 39–36	7,500	
October 20	1:30 p.m.	at Western Michigan	Waldo Stadium; Kalamazoo, MI	L 7–21	21,750	
October 27	1:30 p.m.	Bowling Green^{†}	Fairfield Stadium; Huntington, WV	L 21–24	14,900	
November 3	1:30 p.m.	at Kent State	Dix Stadium; Kent, OH	L 3–35	9,004	
November 10	1:30 p.m.	Toledo	Fairfield Stadium; Huntington, WV	W 17–14	9,500	
November 17	1:30 p.m.	Dayton	Fairfield Stadium; Huntington, WV	W 37–14	9,630	
November 22	11:05 a.m.	Ohio	Fairfield Stadium; Huntington, WV (rivalry)	L 21–35	12,551	
^{†}Homecoming; All times are in Eastern time
