= 1973 Miami Redskins football team =

American college football season

1973 Miami Redskins football

MAC champion Tangerine Bowl champion

Tangerine Bowl, W 16–7 vs. Florida
- Conference: Mid-American Conference

Ranking
- Coaches: No. 17
- AP: No. 15
- Record: 11–0 (5–0 MAC)
- Head coach: Bill Mallory (5th season)
- Home stadium: Miami Field

1973 Mid-American Conference football standings
| | Conf. | | | | | Overall |
| Team | W | | L | | T | W | | L | | T |
|---|---|---|---|---|---|---|---|---|---|---|
| No. 15 Miami (OH) $ | 5 | – | 0 | – | 0 | 11 | – | 0 | – | 0 |
| Kent State | 4 | – | 1 | – | 0 | 9 | – | 2 | – | 0 |
| Bowling Green | 2 | – | 3 | – | 0 | 7 | – | 3 | – | 0 |
| Ohio | 2 | – | 3 | – | 0 | 5 | – | 5 | – | 0 |
| Western Michigan | 1 | – | 4 | – | 0 | 6 | – | 5 | – | 0 |
| Toledo | 1 | – | 4 | – | 0 | 3 | – | 8 | – | 0 |
$ – Conference champion; Rankings from AP Poll

The 1973 Miami Redskins football team was an American football team that represented Miami University during the 1973 NCAA Division I football season. In their fifth and final season under head coach Bill Mallory, the Redskins won the Mid-American Conference (MAC) championship, compiled an 11–0 record (5–0 in MAC), outscored its opponents 223 to 76, and defeated Florida 16–7 in the Tangerine Bowl.

The team's statistical leaders included quarterback Steve Sanna with 927 passing yards, Bob Hitchens with 591 rushing yards, and John Wiggins with 414 receiving yards.

In January 1974, Mallory left for the University of Colorado of the Big Eight Conference.

== Schedule ==
| Date | Time | Opponent | Rank | Site | Result | Attendance | Source |
|---|---|---|---|---|---|---|---|
| September 15 | 1:30 p.m. | Dayton* | | Miami Field; Oxford, OH | W 32–0 | 7,200 | |
| September 22 | 1:30 p.m. | at Purdue* | | Ross–Ade Stadium; West Lafayette, IN | W 24–19 | 53,973 | |
| September 29 | 7:30 p.m. | at South Carolina* | | Williams–Brice Stadium; Columbia, SC | W 13–11 | 41,606 | |
| October 6 | 1:30 p.m. | Marshall* | | Miami Field; Oxford, OH | W 31–6 | 10,200 | |
| October 13 | 1:30 p.m. | Ohio^{†} | No. 20 | Miami Field; Oxford, OH (rivalry) | W 10–6 | 11,800 | |
| October 20 | 1:30 p.m. | at Bowling Green | No. 20 | Doyt Perry Stadium; Bowling Green, OH | W 31–8 | 22,160 | |
| October 27 | 1:30 p.m. | Toledo | No. 16 | Miami Field; Oxford, OH | W 16–0 | 15,061 | |
| November 3 | 1:30 p.m. | at Western Michigan | No. 16 | Waldo Stadium; Kalamazoo, MI | W 24–9 | 18,800 | |
| November 10 | 1:30 p.m. | at No. 19 Kent State | No. 17 | Memorial Stadium; Kent, OH | W 20–10 | 27,363 | |
| November 17 | | Cincinnati* | No. 17 | Miami Field; Oxford, OH (rivalry) | W 6–0 | 13,058 | |
| December 22 | | vs. Florida* | No. 15 | Florida Field; Gainesville, FL (Tangerine Bowl) | W 16–7 | 37,234 | |
*Non-conference game; ^{†}Homecoming; Rankings from AP Poll released prior to the game
