= Elliot Washington II =

American football player (born 2003)

No. 3 – Clemson Tigers
- Position: Cornerback
- Class: Senior

Personal information
- Born: December 16, 2003 (age 22)
- Listed height: 5 ft 11 in (1.80 m)
- Listed weight: 200 lb (91 kg)

Career information
- High school: Venice (Venice, Florida)
- College: Penn State (2023–2025); Clemson (2026–present)
- Stats at ESPN

Elliot Washington II (born December 16, 2003) is an American college football cornerback for the Clemson Tigers. He previously played for the Penn State Nittany Lions.

== Early life ==
Washington is from Venice, Florida. He attended Venice High School where he played football as a defensive back and competed in track and field. He became a starter for the Venice football team as a freshman. He helped Venice to a state championship as a junior and a state championship appearance as a senior; he was a one-year team captain and as a senior totaled 36 tackles and four interceptions. Washington was a four-star prospect and ESPN ranked him as the 54th-best player nationally as well as the fourth-best safety. He initially committed to play college football for the Alabama Crimson Tide but later flipped to the Penn State Nittany Lions.

== College career ==
=== Penn State ===
Washington appeared in 10 games as a true freshman in 2023, being used as a backup on defense and on special teams. He finished the season with nine tackles. As a sophomore in 2024, he was Penn State's top backup cornerback. He appeared in 14 games and posted 26 tackles, six pass breakups and an interception.

On December 11, 2025, Washington announced that he would enter the transfer portal.

=== Clemson ===
On January 5, 2026, Washington announced that he would transfer to Clemson.
