= Alvin Mitchell (running back) =

American football player (born 1964)

No. 49, 41
- Position: Fullback

Personal information
- Born: August 20, 1964 (age 62); Venice, Florida, U.S.
- Listed height: 6 ft 0 in (1.83 m)
- Listed weight: 235 lb (107 kg)

Career information
- High school: Venice
- College: Auburn (1985–1988)
- NFL draft: 1989: undrafted

Career history
- Tampa Bay Buccaneers (1989)

Career NFL statistics
- Receptions: 1
- Receiving yards: 11
- Stats at Pro Football Reference

Alvin Jerome Mitchell (born August 20, 1964) is an American former professional football player who was a fullback for one season with the Tampa Bay Buccaneers of the National Football League (NFL). He played college football for the Auburn Tigers.

== Early life and college ==
Alvin Jerome Mitchell was born on August 20, 1964, in Venice, Florida. He attended Venice High School in Venice.

Mitchell played for the Auburn Tigers as a linebacker, recording 121 career tackles. He was a four-year letterman from 1985 to 1988.

== Professional career ==
Mitchell signed with the Tampa Bay Buccaneers as a fullback on May 1, 1989, and spent the first eleven games of the 1989 season on the practice squad. He was then promoted to the active roster and played in the final five games of the season, catching one pass for 11 yards. He was released by the Buccaneers on August 20, 1990.

== Personal life ==
Mitchell has worked as a minister and policeman.
