= Malachi Wideman =

American football player (born 2001)

Profile
- Position: Wide receiver

Personal information
- Born: November 2, 2001 (age 25); Sarasota, Florida, U.S.
- Listed height: 6 ft 5 in (1.96 m)
- Listed weight: 190 lb (86 kg)

Career information
- High school: Venice (Venice, Florida)
- College: Tennessee (2020); Jackson State (2021–2022)
- NFL draft: 2023: undrafted

Career history
- San Antonio Brahmas (2024)*; Calgary Stampeders (2024)*
- * Offseason or practice squad member only

Malachi Devonne Wideman (born November 2, 2001) is an American professional football wide receiver. He played college football for Tennessee and Jackson State.

== Early life ==
Wideman was born on November 2, 2001, in Sarasota, Florida. He played high school football for Venice High School in Venice. He was a four-star recruit and caught 65 passes for 1,064 and thirteen touchdowns as a senior.

Wideman originally committed to Florida State on May 5, 2019. Following visits with Washington State, Tennessee, Oregon, and Ole Miss he decommitted on February 5, 2020, to commit Tennessee the same day.

College recruiting
Name	Hometown	School	Height	Weight	Commit date
Malachi Wideman; WR	Venice, Florida	Venice High School	6 ft 5 in (1.96 m)	187 lb (85 kg)	Feb 5, 2020
Malachi Wideman; WR	Recruit ratings: Scout: Rivals: 247Sports: ESPN:				
Overall recruit ranking: 247Sports: 117
Note: In many cases, Scout, Rivals, 247Sports, On3, and ESPN may conflict in their listings of height and weight.; In these cases, the average was taken. ESPN grades are on a 100-point scale.; Sources: "2020 Team Ranking". Rivals.com.

== College career ==
=== Tennessee ===
On February 5, 2020, Wideman committed to Tennessee. During his true freshman season, he made his college football debut against Missouri. He made his first-career catch against Kentucky with a 24-yard reception.

On June 23, 2021, Wideman announced he was transferring from the school.

=== Jackson State ===
On July 29, 2021, Wideman transferred to Jackson State to play under Deion Sanders. In his first season in the FCS he tied the SWAC in for touchdown receptions with twelve while also catching 34 passes for 540 yards. Against Bethune–Cookman he had a career-high nine receptions, 169 passing yards, and four receiving touchdowns.

In 2022, Wideman played in six games, only catching three passes for 49 yards and one touchdown. On April 27, 2023, he entered the transfer portal again.

=== Statistics ===
Year	Team	Games	Receiving				
Year	Team	GP	Rec	Yards	Avg	TD	Long
2020	Tennessee	1	1	24	24.0	0	24
2021	Jackson State	11	34	540	15.9	12	50
2022	Jackson State	6	3	49	16.3	1	29
Career		18	38	613	16.1	13	50

== Professional career ==
Pre-draft measurables
Height	Weight
6 ft 4 1/9 in (1.93 m)	190 lb (86 kg)
All values from NFL Scouting Combine/Pro Day

=== San Antonio Brahmas ===
Despite having eligibility remaining, Wideman entered the 2023 NFL supplemental draft where he went undrafted. On July 12, 2023, Wideman was added to the free agents rights list of the San Antonio Brahmas of the XFL. He signed with the Brahmas on October 20, 2023. He was not part of the roster after the 2024 UFL dispersal draft on January 15, 2024.

=== Calgary Stampeders ===
On January 24, 2024, Wideman signed with the Calgary Stampeders of the Canadian Football League (CFL). He was placed on the team's suspended list on May 11, 2024.

== Personal life ==
Wideman is the son of Angela (Wideman) and Tony Green. He has four siblings: one brother and three sisters .
