= Mark Guthrie =

American baseball player (born 1965)

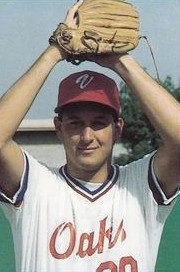
- Guthrie in 1988
- Pitcher
- Born: September 22, 1965 (age 60); Buffalo, New York, U.S.
- Batted: Left Threw: Left

MLB debut
- July 25, 1989, for the Minnesota Twins

Last MLB appearance
- September 28, 2003, for the Chicago Cubs

MLB statistics
- Win–loss record: 51–54
- Earned run average: 4.05
- Strikeouts: 778
- Stats at Baseball Reference

Teams
- Minnesota Twins (1989–1995); Los Angeles Dodgers (1995–1998); Boston Red Sox (1999); Chicago Cubs (1999–2000); Tampa Bay Devil Rays (2000); Toronto Blue Jays (2000); Oakland Athletics (2001); New York Mets (2002); Chicago Cubs (2003)

Career highlights and awards
- World Series champion (1991)

Mark Andrew Guthrie (born September 22, 1965) is an American former Major League Baseball relief pitcher who played for several teams between 1989 and 2003, and was a member of the 1991 World Series Champion Minnesota Twins.

== Career ==
After graduating from Venice High School in Venice, Florida, Guthrie attended Louisiana State University (LSU). He and Venice High teammate. Craig Faulkner walked on at LSU where he played under Skip Bertman. He led the LSU Tigers baseball team in earned run average (ERA) in 1985 and was named to the all-Southeastern Conference first team in 1986, leading the Tigers to their first College World Series. After the 1986 season, he played collegiate summer baseball with the Harwich Mariners of the Cape Cod Baseball League.

The Minnesota Twins selected Guthrie in the seventh round of the 1987 Major League Baseball draft. He played in the major leagues for Minnesota from 1989 to 1995. On November 6, 1996, he signed as a free agent with the Los Angeles Dodgers, where he played until the close of 1998. Following his membership with the Dodgers, Guthrie was a player for the Boston Red Sox, Chicago Cubs, Oakland Athletics, Toronto Blue Jays and the New York Mets. Guthrie earned over $15 million during his professional career (1989–2003). As a member of the Chicago Cubs in 2003, Guthrie took the loss in Game 1 of the 2003 National League Championship Series surrendering an 11th inning home run to the Marlins Mike Lowell.

== Personal ==
His son, Dalton Guthrie, played college baseball at the University of Florida, was drafted in the sixth round of the 2017 MLB draft by the Philadelphia Phillies, made his major league debut in 2022 with the Phillies, in 2023 was traded to the San Francisco Giants and in 2024 signed a minor league contract with the Boston Red Sox.
