= 1973 Ohio Bobcats football team =

American college football season

1973 Ohio Bobcats football
- Conference: Mid-American Conference
- Record: 5–5 (2–3 MAC)
- Head coach: Bill Hess (16th season)
- Home stadium: Peden Stadium

1973 Mid-American Conference football standings
	Conf.					Overall
Team	W		L		T	W		L		T
No. 15 Miami (OH) $	5	–	0	–	0	11	–	0	–	0
Kent State	4	–	1	–	0	9	–	2	–	0
Bowling Green	2	–	3	–	0	7	–	3	–	0
Ohio	2	–	3	–	0	5	–	5	–	0
Western Michigan	1	–	4	–	0	6	–	5	–	0
Toledo	1	–	4	–	0	3	–	8	–	0
$ – Conference champion; Rankings from AP Poll

The 1973 Ohio Bobcats football team was an American football team that represented Ohio University in the Mid-American Conference (MAC) during the 1973 NCAA Division I football season. In their 16th season under head coach Bill Hess, the Bobcats compiled a 5–5 record (2–3 against MAC opponents), finished in a tie for third place in the MAC, and were outscored by all opponents by a combined total of 231 to 156. They played their home games in Peden Stadium in Athens, Ohio.

== Schedule ==
Date	Time	Opponent	Site	Result	Attendance	Source
September 22	1:30 p.m.	Kent State	Peden Stadium; Athens, OH	L 7–35	14,450	
September 29	7:30 p.m.	at Toledo	Glass Bowl; Toledo, OH	L 8–35	12,437	
October 6	2:30 p.m.	at Northwestern*	Dyche Stadium; Evanston, IL	W 14–12	21,056	
October 13	1:30 p.m.	at No. 20 Miami (OH)	Miami Field; Oxford, OH (rivalry)	L 6–10	11,800	
October 20	7:31 p.m.	at South Carolina*	Williams–Brice Stadium; Columbia, SC	L 22–38	39,021	
October 27	1:30 p.m.	Western Michigan	Peden Stadium; Athens, OH	W 16–0	14,000	
November 3	1:30 p.m.	Bowling Green	Peden Stadium; Athens, OH	W 24–23	12,200	
November 10	1:30 p.m.	Cincinnati*	Peden Stadium; Athens, OH	W 14–8	13,400	
November 17	1:30 p.m.	at No. 6 Penn State*	Beaver Stadium; University Park, PA	L 10–49	51,804	
November 22	11:05 a.m.	at Marshall*	Fairfield Stadium; Huntington, WV (rivalry)	W 35–21	12,551	
*Non-conference game; Rankings from AP Poll released prior to the game

== Game summaries ==
=== Penn State ===
Penn State vs. Ohio

Quarter	1	2	3	4	Total
Ohio	7	0	3	0	10
#6 Penn State	14	14	21	0	49

at Beaver Stadium • University Park, PA

- Date: Saturday, November 10, 1973
- Game attendance: 51,804

Game information

First Quarter

- PSU — John Cappelletti 1-yard run (Chris Bahr kick).
- Ohio — Bevly 2 yard run (Homer kick).
- PSU — John Cappelletti 1-yard run (Bahr kick).

Second Quarter

- PSU — John Cappelletti 25-yard run (Bahr kick).
- PSU — John Cappelletti 15-yard run (Bahr kick).

Third Quarter

- PSU — Tom Hull 29-yard blocked punt return (Bahr kick).
- PSU — Ed O’Neil 66-yard interception return (Bahr kick).
- Ohio — Homer 57-yard FG.
- PSU — Walt Addie 18-yard run (Bahr kick).

Fourth Quarter

- (no scoring).

Team	Category	Player	Statistics
OU	Passing	Rich Bevly	TD run, INT
OU	Rushing		
OU	Receiving	Mike Green	Multiple receptions
PSU	Passing	Tom Shuman	
PSU	Rushing	John Cappelletti	204 Yds, 4 TD
PSU	Receiving	Dan Natale	Key 30-yard reception

Penn State tailback John Cappelletti delivered one of the most dominant performances of his career, rushing for 204 yards and scoring four touchdowns in less than 30 minutes of play as the sixth-ranked Nittany Lions defeated Ohio, 49–10, at Beaver Stadium. The victory marked Penn State’s 10th consecutive win of the season and its 20th straight regular-season victory overall. Cappelletti scored all four of his touchdowns in the first half, becoming Penn State’s second-leading all-time rusher and strengthening his Heisman Trophy candidacy. Penn State’s defense and special teams added to the rout in the second half, as linebacker Tom Hull returned a blocked punt 29 yards for a touchdown and Ed O’Neil intercepted a pass and returned it 66 yards for another score.
