= 1973 Toledo Rockets football team =

American college football season

1973 Toledo Rockets football
- Conference: Mid-American Conference
- Record: 3–8 (1–4 MAC)
- Head coach: Jack Murphy (3rd season)
- Defensive coordinator: Dan Simrell (1st season)
- Home stadium: Glass Bowl

1973 Mid-American Conference football standings
	Conf.					Overall
Team	W		L		T	W		L		T
No. 15 Miami (OH) $	5	–	0	–	0	11	–	0	–	0
Kent State	4	–	1	–	0	9	–	2	–	0
Bowling Green	2	–	3	–	0	7	–	3	–	0
Ohio	2	–	3	–	0	5	–	5	–	0
Western Michigan	1	–	4	–	0	6	–	5	–	0
Toledo	1	–	4	–	0	3	–	8	–	0
$ – Conference champion; Rankings from AP Poll

The 1973 Toledo Rockets football team was an American football team that represented the University of Toledo in the Mid-American Conference (MAC) during the 1973 NCAA Division I football season. In their third season under head coach Jack Murphy, the Rockets compiled a 3–8 record (1–4 against MAC opponents), finished in a tie for last place in the MAC, and were outscored by all opponents by a combined total of 288 to 229.

The team's statistical leaders included Gene Swick with 2,234 passing yards, Herman Price with 595 rushing yards, and Don Seymour with 773 receiving yards.

== Schedule ==
Date	Time	Opponent	Site	Result	Attendance	Source
September 15	7:30 p.m.	at Tampa*	Tampa Stadium; Tampa, FL	L 25–35	17,412	
September 22		Central Michigan*	Glass Bowl; Toledo, OH	W 23–21	13,128	
September 29	7:30 p.m.	Ohio	Glass Bowl; Toledo, OH	W 35–8	12,437	
October 6	1:30 p.m.	at Bowling Green	Doyt Perry Stadium; Bowling Green, OH (rivalry)	L 35–49	22,684	
October 13	7:30 p.m.	Western Michigan	Glass Bowl; Toledo, OH	L 22–24	12,284	
October 20		Dayton*	Glass Bowl; Toledo, OH	W 14–10	12,286	
October 27	1:30 p.m.	at No. 16. Miami (OH)	Miami Field; Oxford, OH	L 0–16	15,061	
November 3	3:00 p.m.	at Colorado State*	Hughes Stadium; Fort Collins, CO	L 14–21	13,798	
November 10	1:30 p.m.	at Marshall*	Fairfield Stadium; Huntington, WV	L 14–17	9,500	
November 17	7:30 p.m.	Kent State	Glass Bowl; Toledo, OH	L 16–52	12,021	
November 23	2:00 p.m.	at Xavier*	Xavier Stadium; Cincinnati, OH	L 31–35	6,307	
*Non-conference game; Rankings from AP Poll released prior to the game; All times are in Eastern time
