= 1973 Kent State Golden Flashes football team =

American college football season

1973 Kent State Golden Flashes football
- Conference: Mid-American Conference
- Record: 9–2 (4–1 MAC)
- Head coach: Don James (3rd season)
- Offensive coordinator: Dick Scesniak (3rd season)
- Defensive coordinator: Dennis Fitzgerald (3rd season)
- Home stadium: Dix Stadium

1973 Mid-American Conference football standings
	Conf.					Overall
Team	W		L		T	W		L		T
No. 15 Miami (OH) $	5	–	0	–	0	11	–	0	–	0
Kent State	4	–	1	–	0	9	–	2	–	0
Bowling Green	2	–	3	–	0	7	–	3	–	0
Ohio	2	–	3	–	0	5	–	5	–	0
Western Michigan	1	–	4	–	0	6	–	5	–	0
Toledo	1	–	4	–	0	3	–	8	–	0
$ – Conference champion; Rankings from AP Poll

The 1973 Kent State Golden Flashes football team was an American football team that represented Kent State University in the Mid-American Conference (MAC) during the 1973 NCAA Division I football season. In their third season under head coach Don James, the Golden Flashes compiled a 9–2 record (4–1 against MAC opponents), finished in second place in the MAC, and outscored all opponents by a combined total of 300 to 131. Nick Saban, a defensive back for the Golden Flashes the previous three seasons, was a graduate assistant on James' staff during the 1973 season.

The team included brothers Larry Poole, a tailback, and Tommie Poole, a defensive tackle.

Don James was credited with turning a "mediocre" Kent State program into a MAC power in his four years as head coach. The team's 9–2 record in 1973 was the best in program history.

== Schedule ==
Date	Time	Opponent	Rank	Site	Result	Attendance	Source
September 15	1:30 p.m.	Louisville*		Dix Stadium; Kent, OH	W 10–3	10,217	
September 22	1:30 p.m.	at Ohio		Peden Stadium; Athens, OH	W 35–7	14,450	
September 30	10:30 p.m.	at San Diego State*		San Diego Stadium; San Diego, CA	L 9–17	28,416–28,461	
October 6	1:30 p.m.	at Western Michigan		Waldo Stadium; Kalamazoo, MI	W 39–15	19,300	
October 13	1:30 p.m.	Bowling Green		Dix Stadium; Kent, OH (rivalry)	W 21–7	25,137	
October 20	1:30 p.m.	No. 12 (small) Eastern Michigan		Dix Stadium; Kent, OH	W 34–20	14,406–14,426	
October 27	3:30 p.m.	at Utah State*		Romney Stadium; Logan, UT	W 27–16	8,703	
November 3	1:30 p.m.	Marshall*		Dix Stadium; Kent, OH	W 35–3	9,004	
November 10	1:30 p.m.	No. 17 Miami (OH)	No. 19	Dix Stadium; Kent, OH	L 10–20	27,363	
November 17	7:30 p.m.	at Toledo		Glass Bowl; Toledo, OH	W 52–16	12,021	
November 24	11:00 a.m.	Central Michigan		Dix Stadium; Kent, OH	W 28–7	3,870	
*Non-conference game; Rankings from AP Poll released prior to the game

== Team players drafted into the NFL ==
Player	Position	Round	Pick	NFL club
Gerald Tinker	Wide receiver	2	44	Atlanta Falcons
Jack Lambert	Linebacker	2	46	Pittsburgh Steelers
