= Dalton Guthrie =

American baseball player (born 1995)

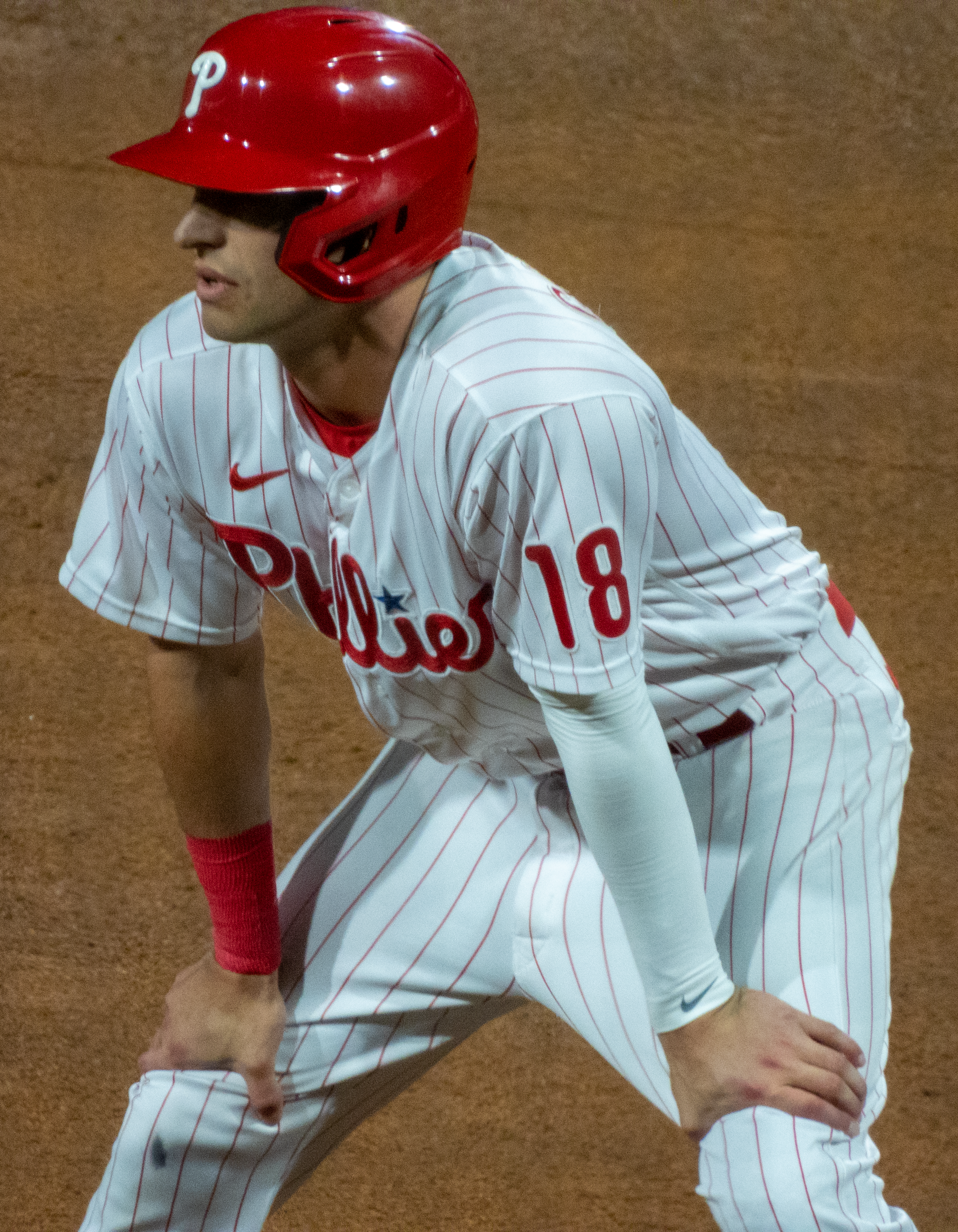
- Guthrie with the Philadelphia Phillies in 2022

Leones de Yucatán – No. 5
- Utility player
- Born: December 23, 1995 (age 30); Sarasota, Florida, U.S.
- Bats: Right Throws: Right

MLB debut
- September 6, 2022, for the Philadelphia Phillies

MLB statistics (through 2023 season)
- Batting average: .244
- Home runs: 1
- Runs batted in: 5
- Stats at Baseball Reference

Teams
- Philadelphia Phillies (2022–2023)

Dalton James Guthrie (born December 23, 1995) is an American professional baseball infielder and outfielder for the Leones de Yucatán of the Mexican League. He has previously played in Major League Baseball (MLB) for the Philadelphia Phillies. He played college baseball for the Florida Gators, and was selected in the 6th round of the 2017 MLB draft by the Phillies.

== Early life ==
Guthrie is the son of former 15-year major league pitcher Mark Guthrie, and is Jewish. His father is Christian, his mother is Jewish, and his maternal grandparents are Hungarian Jewish immigrants, who came to the U.S. in the 1950s. He grew up in Sarasota, Florida. He attended the Goldie Feldman Academy at Temple Beth Sholom in Sarasota for kindergarten and first grade. He then attended Pine View Elementary Magnet School in Land o' Lakes, Florida.

Guthrie attended Venice High School. Playing baseball in high school, he was a two-time all-state and all-state academic team selection at shortstop. In his senior year he was one of nine players in the U.S. named to the 2014 Rawlings High School Gold Glove Team, was chosen as the 2014 Florida Dairy Farmers Player of the Year for Class 6A, and was named the Sarasota Herald-Tribune Player of the Year.

== College career ==
Guthrie played college baseball for the Florida Gators, where he was a three-year starter. He was named a freshman All-American and to the Southeastern Conference (SEC) All-Freshman team after hitting .287/.362/.365 with 81 hits while starting at second base. Guthrie moved to shortstop and batted leadoff as a sophomore, and was named second team All-SEC and to the SEC All-Defensive Team after leading the Gators with a .305 batting average with 85 hits (6th in the Southeastern Conference) and six sacrifice flies (third).

He underwent ulnar nerve transposition surgery in the fall of 2016. In 2017 Guthrie batted .273/.349/.356, with 11 stolen bases (10th) and six sacrifice flies (third), and was named to the 2017 SEC All-Defensive Team. In his college career, he played 127 games at shortstop, and 69 games at second base.

== Professional career ==
=== Philadelphia Phillies ===
==== 2017–21 ====
Guthrie was selected in the 6th round of the 2017 Major League Baseball draft by the Philadelphia Phillies. After signing with the team for a signing bonus of $350,000, he was assigned to the Gulf Coast League Phillies with whom he had 22 at-bats. He also began the 2018 season with the team (11 at bats), before being reassigned to the Single–A Lakewood Blue Claws, for whom he batted .241/.296/.342 in 307 at-bats with six sacrifice hits (9th in the South Atlantic League) and seven sacrifice flies (third). Guthrie spent the 2019 season with the Clearwater Threshers of the High–A Florida State League and batted .243/.284/.362 in 301 at-bats.

Guthrie did not play in a game in 2020 due to the cancellation of the minor league season because of the COVID-19 pandemic. He returned to action in 2021 and began the season with the Double-A Reading Fightin Phils, for whom he batted .242/.317/.364 in 165 at–bats. He was promoted to the Triple-A Lehigh Valley IronPigs, for whom he batted .292/.329/.439 with 13 doubles in 130 at–bats.

==== 2022–23 ====
Guthrie was assigned to Lehigh Valley to start the 2022 season. With Lehigh Valley in 2022, he batted .302/.363/.476 in 338 at-bats with 27 doubles (7th in the International League), 9 hit by pitch (8th), and 21 stolen bases (11th; leading the team). He played 59 games in center field, 25 in right field, two each at shortstop, second base, and DH, and one each at third base and left field. Guthrie was named a 2022 MiLB Organization All Star. IronPigs manager Anthony Contreras said "[Guthrie] is the same guy every time he steps on the field. He plays 100 mph, gives you everything he has."

The Phillies selected Guthrie's contract on September 4, 2022, and promoted him to the active roster. He made his MLB debut on September 6, starting in right field and going 0-for-3 against the Miami Marlins. Guthrie hit an RBI single off of Patrick Corbin on September 9, for the first hit of his career and finished the game with two hits and two RBI in three at bats in a 5-3 win over the Washington Nationals. On September 20, Guthrie hit his first career home run, a solo shot off of Ross Stripling of the Toronto Blue Jays. In his rookie season, Guthrie was 7-for-21 (.333) with six walks and a home run, and played 12 games in right field, one game at third base, and one game at second base.

Guthrie played for the Phillies in the post-season, in the 2022 National League Division Series. He served as a pinch-runner and playing a pair of innings in right field.

In 2023 for the Phillies, he batted .167/.286/.208 in limited action across 23 big–league games. Although he played only seven games in center field, Guthrie tied for third in the NL with two double plays from center field. In Triple–A, he batted .281/.385/.476 in 96 at–bats, playing primarily center field. On June 19, 2023, he was designated for assignment by Philadelphia after Darick Hall was activated from the injured list.

=== San Francisco Giants ===
On June 22, 2023, Guthrie was traded to the San Francisco Giants in exchange for cash considerations. In nine games for the Triple–A Sacramento River Cats, he batted .275/.310/.375 with one RBI and one stolen base. Guthrie was designated for assignment by the Giants on July 6, following the promotion of Mauricio Llovera.

=== Atlanta Braves ===
On July 13, 2023, Guthrie was claimed off waivers by the Atlanta Braves, and optioned to the Triple–A Gwinnett Stripers. He hit .306 in 10 games for Gwinnett before he was designated for assignment on August 4. He cleared waivers and was sent outright to Triple–A on August 6. Guthrie elected free agency following the season on November 6.

As of the end of the 2023 season, Guthrie had batted .289/.357/.434 in his three years playing Triple-A baseball. In his professional career, he had played 115 games in center field, 104 at shortstop, 96 at second base, 74 at third base, 54 in right field, and 44 in left field.

In his limited major league career Guthrie had a 16.1% walk rate through 2023, and in his first two season in the majors had ranked in the 88th and 82nd MLB percentile for sprint speed.

=== Boston Red Sox ===
On February 7, 2024, Guthrie signed a minor league contract with the Boston Red Sox. In 51 appearances for the Triple-A Worcester Red Sox, he batted .254/.321/.303 with one home run, 12 RBI, and 11 stolen bases. Guthrie elected free agency following the season on November 4.

=== Gastonia Ghost Peppers ===
On April 17, 2025, Guthrie signed with the Gastonia Ghost Peppers of the Atlantic League of Professional Baseball. On July 18, Guthrie tied an ALPB record with six hits in a 16-4 victory over the Staten Island FerryHawks. In 104 Pleatsnces for Gastonia, he batted .325/.375/.550 with 18 home runs, 88 RBI, and 20 stolen bases.

=== Leones de Yucatán ===
On November 24, 2025, Guthrie signed a with the Leones de Yucatán of the Mexican League.

== See also ==
- List of Jewish Major League Baseball players
