= 1973 Western Michigan Broncos football team =

American college football season

1973 Western Michigan Broncos football
- Conference: Mid-American Conference
- Record: 6–5 (1–4 MAC)
- Head coach: Bill Doolittle (10th season)
- MVP: Dominic Riggio
- Captains: Larry Cates; Dominic Riggio
- Home stadium: Waldo Stadium

1973 Mid-American Conference football standings
	Conf.					Overall
Team	W		L		T	W		L		T
No. 15 Miami (OH) $	5	–	0	–	0	11	–	0	–	0
Kent State	4	–	1	–	0	9	–	2	–	0
Bowling Green	2	–	3	–	0	7	–	3	–	0
Ohio	2	–	3	–	0	5	–	5	–	0
Western Michigan	1	–	4	–	0	6	–	5	–	0
Toledo	1	–	4	–	0	3	–	8	–	0
$ – Conference champion; Rankings from AP Poll

The 1973 Western Michigan Broncos football team represented Western Michigan University in the Mid-American Conference (MAC) during the 1973 NCAA Division I football season. In their 10th season under head coach Bill Doolittle, the Broncos compiled a 6–5 record (1–4 against MAC opponents), finished in a tie for fifth place in the MAC, and were outscored by their opponents, 218 to 190. The team played its home games at Waldo Stadium in Kalamazoo, Michigan.

The team's statistical leaders included Paul Jorgensen with 718 passing yards and 476 rushing yards and Ted Forrest with 282 receiving yards. Fullback Larry Cates and linebacker Dominic Riggio were the team captains. For the second consecutive year, Riggio received the team's most outstanding player award.

== Schedule ==
Date	Time	Opponent	Site	Result	Attendance	Source
September 8	1:30 p.m.	at Central Michigan	Perry Shorts Stadium; Mount Pleasant, MI (rivalry)	W 18–13	17,417	
September 15	1:30 p.m.	Long Beach State*	Waldo Stadium; Kalamazoo, MI	W 13–8	20,050–20,700	
September 22	1:30 p.m.	Northern Illinois*	Waldo Stadium; Kalamazoo, MI	W 28–14	19,400	
September 29	1:30 p.m.	at Bowling Green	Doyt Perry Stadium; Bowling Green, OH	L 20–31	14,231	
October 6	1:30 p.m.	Kent State	Waldo Stadium; Kalamazoo, MI	L 15–39	19,300	
October 13	7:30 p.m.	at Toledo	Glass Bowl; Toledo, OH	W 24–22	12,284	
October 20	1:30 p.m.	Marshall*	Waldo Stadium; Kalamazoo, MI	W 21–7	21,750	
October 27	1:30 p.m.	at Ohio	Peden Stadium; Athens, OH	L 0–16	14,000	
November 3	1:30 p.m.	Miami (OH)	Waldo Stadium; Kalamazoo, MI	L 9–24	18,800	
November 10	1:30 p.m.	Ball State*	Waldo Stadium; Kalamazoo, MI	W 30–13	16,100	
November 17	3:00 p.m.	at UT Arlington*	Arlington Stadium; Arlington, TX	L 12–31	3,200	
*Non-conference game; All times are in Eastern time
