= 2009 Kent State Golden Flashes football team =

American college football season

2009 Kent State Golden Flashes football
- Conference: Mid-American Conference
- East
- Record: 5–7 (4–4 MAC)
- Head coach: Doug Martin (6th season)
- Offensive coordinator: A. J. Pratt (2nd season)
- Offensive scheme: Air raid
- Defensive coordinator: Pete Rekstis (6th season)
- Base defense: 4–3
- Home stadium: Dix Stadium

2009 Mid-American Conference football standings
	Conf.			Overall
Team	W		L	W		L
East Division
Ohio xy	7	–	1	9	–	5
Temple x	7	–	1	9	–	4
Bowling Green	6	–	2	7	–	6
Kent State	4	–	4	5	–	7
Buffalo	3	–	5	5	–	7
Akron	2	–	6	3	–	9
Miami (OH)	1	–	7	1	–	11
West Division
No. 23 Central Michigan x$	8	–	0	12	–	2
Northern Illinois	5	–	3	7	–	6
Western Michigan	4	–	4	5	–	7
Toledo	3	–	5	5	–	7
Ball State	2	–	6	2	–	10
Eastern Michigan	0	–	8	0	–	12
Championship: Central Michigan 20, Ohio 10
$ – Conference champion; x – Division champion/co-champions; y – Championship game participant; Rankings from AP Poll

The 2009 Kent State Golden Flashes football team represented Kent State University during the 2009 NCAA Division I FBS football season. Kent State competed as a member of the Mid-American Conference (MAC) East Division. The team was coached by Doug Martin and played their homes game at Dix Stadium. The team finished with a record of 5–7 (4–4 MAC).

== Before the season ==
=== Recruiting ===
College recruiting information (2009)
Name	Hometown	School	Height	Weight	40^{‡}	Commit date
Dri Archer; RB	Venice, FL	Venice Senior HS	5 ft 7 in (1.70 m)	160 lb (73 kg)	-	Feb 3, 2009
Dri Archer; RB	Recruit ratings: Scout: Rivals: (40)					
Tyler Arend; OL	Paulding, OH	Paulding HS	6 ft 4 in (1.93 m)	287 lb (130 kg)	5.53	Jan 12, 2009
Tyler Arend; OL	Recruit ratings: Scout: Rivals: (71)					
Luke Batton; LB	Macedonia, OH	Nordonia HS	6 ft 1 in (1.85 m)	205 lb (93 kg)	4.69	Oct 17, 2008
Luke Batton; LB	Recruit ratings: Scout: Rivals: (40)					
Anthony Bowman; RB	Scottsdale, AZ	Scottsdale	5 ft 10 in (1.78 m)	168 lb (76 kg)	-	Feb 4, 2009
Anthony Bowman; RB	Recruit ratings: Scout: Rivals:					
Dana Brown; DT	McKeesport, PA	McKeesport Area SHS	6 ft 1 in (1.85 m)	257 lb (117 kg)	5	Jan 8, 2009
Dana Brown; DT	Recruit ratings: Scout: Rivals: (64)					
Edward Cazenave; WR	Dallas, GA	East Paulding HS	6 ft 1 in (1.85 m)	180 lb (82 kg)	4.5	Jan 31, 2009
Edward Cazenave; WR	Recruit ratings: Scout: Rivals: (40)					
Freddy Cortez; K	Fort Meade, FL	Fort Meade HS	5 ft 10 in (1.78 m)	170 lb (77 kg)	-	Feb 3, 2009
Freddy Cortez; K	Recruit ratings: Scout: Rivals: (40)					
Mike Daniels; DB	Chatham, VA	Hargrave Military Academy	6 ft 1 in (1.85 m)	195 lb (88 kg)	4.6	Feb 3, 2009
Mike Daniels; DB	Recruit ratings: Scout: Rivals: (40)					
Jacob Dooley; LB	Mason, OH	William Mason HS	6 ft 2 in (1.88 m)	215 lb (98 kg)	-	Feb 3, 2009
Jacob Dooley; LB	Recruit ratings: Scout: Rivals: (40)					
Zack Gonosz; DB	Dallas, GA	East Paulding HS	5 ft 10 in (1.78 m)	185 lb (84 kg)	-	Feb 3, 2009
Zack Gonosz; DB	Recruit ratings: Scout: Rivals: (40)					
Tyshon Goode; ATH	Chatham, VA	Hargrave Military Academy	6 ft 1 in (1.85 m)	186 lb (84 kg)	4.5	Dec 22, 2008
Tyshon Goode; ATH	Recruit ratings: Scout: Rivals: (40)					
Danny Gress; LB	Clayton, OH	Northmont HS	6 ft 1 in (1.85 m)	225 lb (102 kg)	4.75	Jun 1, 2008
Danny Gress; LB	Recruit ratings: Scout: Rivals: (71)					
Devonte Helms; LB	Oxon Hill, MD	Potomac HS	6 ft 2 in (1.88 m)	254 lb (115 kg)	-	Jan 8, 2009
Devonte Helms; LB	Recruit ratings: Scout: Rivals: (40)					
Spencer Keith; QB	Little Rock, AR	Pulaski Academy	6 ft 2 in (1.88 m)	182 lb (83 kg)	4.65	Feb 12, 2009
Spencer Keith; QB	Recruit ratings: Rivals: (72)					
Garrick Piggott; WR	Chatham, VA	Hargrave Military Academy	6 ft 1 in (1.85 m)	185 lb (84 kg)	4.6	Feb 3, 2009
Garrick Piggott; WR	Recruit ratings: Scout: Rivals: (40)					
Max Plunkett; OL	Kettering, OH	Archbishop Alter HS	6 ft 8 in (2.03 m)	310 lb (140 kg)	5.5	Dec 7, 2008
Max Plunkett; OL	Recruit ratings: Scout: Rivals: (40)					
Darius Polk; DB	Chatham, VA	Hargrave Military Academy	6 ft 1 in (1.85 m)	195 lb (88 kg)	4.6	Jan 8, 2009
Darius Polk; DB	Recruit ratings: Scout: Rivals: (40)					
Fabrice Pratt; DB	Miami, FL	Miami Sunset Senior HS	6 ft 1 in (1.85 m)	170 lb (77 kg)	-	Jun 3, 2008
Fabrice Pratt; DB	Recruit ratings: Scout: Rivals: (76)					
C.J. Steward; LB	Chatham, VA	Hargrave Military Academy	6 ft 1 in (1.85 m)	210 lb (95 kg)	4.56	Jan 8, 2009
C.J. Steward; LB	Recruit ratings: Scout: Rivals: (40)					
Bryan Wagner; OL	Mantua, OH	Crestwood HS	6 ft 5 in (1.96 m)	285 lb (129 kg)	5	Apr 6, 2008
Bryan Wagner; OL	Recruit ratings: Scout: Rivals: (72)					
Jeff Walker; WR	Akron, OH	Coventry HS	6 ft 4 in (1.93 m)	197 lb (89 kg)	4.5	Dec 15, 2008
Jeff Walker; WR	Recruit ratings: Scout: Rivals: (74)					
Kent Walker; LB	Chatham, VA	Hargrave Military Academy	6 ft 2 in (1.88 m)	235 lb (107 kg)	4.48	Dec 22, 2008
Kent Walker; LB	Recruit ratings: Scout: Rivals: (40)					
Brian Winters; OL	Hudson, OH	Hudson HS	6 ft 5 in (1.96 m)	317 lb (144 kg)	-	Dec 25, 2008
Brian Winters; OL	Recruit ratings: Scout: Rivals: (40)					
Overall recruit ranking: Scout: 114 Rivals: 62
‡ Refers to 40-yard dash; Note: In many cases, Scout, Rivals, 247Sports, On3, and ESPN may conflict in their listings of height, weight and 40 time.; In these cases, the average was taken. ESPN grades are on a 100-point scale.; Sources: "Kent State Commit List for 2009". Rivals.; "Football Recruiting: Kent State". Scout.; "Kent State Football Recruiting 2009". ESPN.; "Scout.com Team Recruiting Rankings". Scout.; "2009 Team Ranking". Rivals.com.

== Schedule ==
Date	Time	Opponent	Site	TV	Result	Attendance
September 3	7:00 p.m.	Coastal Carolina (FCS)*	Dix Stadium; Kent, OH		W 18–0	16,481
September 12	2:00 p.m.	at Boston College*	Alumni Stadium; Chestnut Hill, MA	ESPN360	L 7–34	25,165
September 19	7:00 p.m.	Iowa State*	Dix Stadium; Kent, OH	ESPN360	L 14–34	15,808
September 26	7:00 p.m.	Miami (OH)	Dix Stadium; Kent, OH		W 29–19	15,235
October 3	7:00 p.m.	at Baylor*	Floyd Casey Stadium; Waco, TX		L 15–31	27,047
October 10	3:30 p.m.	Bowling Green	Dix Stadium; Kent, OH (Battle for the Anniversary Award)	FSN	L 35–36	15,211
October 17	4:00 p.m.	at Eastern Michigan	Rynearson Stadium; Ypsilanti, MI		W 28–6	2,401
October 24	2:00 p.m.	at Ohio	Peden Stadium; Athens, OH		W 20–11	17,968
October 31	2:00 p.m.	Western Michigan	Dix Stadium; Kent, OH		W 26–14	15,206
November 7	3:30 p.m.	at Akron	InfoCision Stadium; Akron, OH (Battle for the Wagon Wheel)	FSN	L 20–28	20,802
November 21	1:00 p.m.	at Temple	Lincoln Financial Field; Philadelphia, PA		L 13–47	21,046
November 27	2:00 p.m.	Buffalo	Dix Stadium; Kent, OH	ESPNU	L 6–9	15,131
*Non-conference game; All times are in Eastern time

== Roster ==
As of 2009-07-22
Wide receivers: 3 Derek McBryde - Senior; 5 Tyshon Goode - Freshman; 8 Mathew Hurdle - (redshirt) Freshman; 9 Phil Garner - Senior; 12 Sam Kirkland - Sophomore; 13 Leneric Muldrow - Junior; 15 Kendrick Pressley - Sophomore; 16 Mark Woodson - Senior; 17 Ed Cazenave - Freshman; 20 Arthur Beck - Senior; 26 Jameson Konz - Senior; 82 Chris Gordon - Sophomore; 83 Daamon Cooper - (redshirt) Freshman; 85 Aaron Robinson - Junior; 87 Jeff Walker - Freshman; Offensive line: 50 Matt Conroy - Senior; 55 Chris Anzevino - (redshirt) Sophomore; 61 Josh Kline - (redshirt) Freshman; 64 Seamus Garvey - (redshirt) Freshman; 65 Kent Cleveland - (redshirt) Freshman; 66 Brian Winters - Freshman; 69 Michael Fay - Sophomore; 70 Tyler Arend - Freshman; 71 Charles Laster - Sophomore; 73 Aaron Cooper - Junior; 75 Dante Campbell - Senior; 76 Mike Roder - Senior; 77 Max Plunkett - Freshman; 78 Pat Reedy - Junior; Tight ends: 24 Jonathan Simpson - Junior; 81 Justin Thompson - Sophomore; 84 Lester Troutman - Senior; 87 Nick Masters - Junior	Quarterbacks: X Julian Edelman - (redshirt) Senior; 2 Sal Battles - Sophomore; 5 Jon Brown - Senior; 7 Anthony Magazu - Senior; 11 Spencer Keith - Freshman; 14 Giorgio Morgan - (redshirt) Sophomore; Running backs: 6 Eugene Jarvis - Senior; 10 Andre Flowers - Junior; 22 Jacquise Terry - Sophomore; 25 Anthony Bowman - Junior; 28 Dri Archer - Freshman; 32 Alan Vanderink - Junior; 36 Norman Wolfe - Sophomore; Defensive line: 20 Quinton Rainey - Junior; 49 Monte Simmons - Junior; 52 Dana Brown - Freshman; 54 DeVonte' Helms - Freshman; 60 Jhordan Haye- Sophomore; 67 Aaron Hull - Senior; 74 Sam Frist - Senior; 77 Lee Stalker - Sophomore; 89 Chris Favazzo - Sophomore; 91 Ryan Jude - (redshirt) Freshman; 92 Andrew Christopher - Freshman; 93 Ishmaa'ily Kitchen - Sophomore; 94 Kevin Hogan - Senior; 97 Zach Williams - Junior	Linebackers: 3 Will Johnson - Junior; 4 C.J. Steward - Freshman; 11 Cobrani Mixon - (redshirt) Junior; 30 Luke Batton - Freshman; 34 Ryan Hidalgo - Sophomore; 35 Dorian Wood - Junior; 42 Joshua Stover - (redshirt) Freshman; 44 Byron Tyson - Sophomore; 51 Anthony Mirando - Senior; 53 Kyle Reese - Sophomore; 56 Howard Bowens - Junior; 57 Jake Dooley - Freshman; 58 Danny Gress - Freshman; 59 Kent Walker - Freshman; 90 Joe Tymoszczuk - Junior; 96 Marc Lechlitner - Sophomore; Defensive backs: 1 Darius Polk - Freshman; 2 Josh Pleasant - Sophomore; 4 Mark Follen - (redshirt) Freshman; 7 Fabrice Pratt - Freshman; 8 Adam Richey - Senior; 12 Kenneth Watley. Jr. - (redshirt) Sophomore; 14 Sidney Saulter - (redshirt) Freshman; 18 Garrick Piggott - Freshman; 19 Mike Daniels - Freshman; 20 Leon Green - (redshirt) Freshman; 21 Danny Sadler - Senior; 23 Chris Gilbert - Sophomore; 25 Brian Hummer - Sophomore; 27 Greg Keys - Senior; 29 B.G Walters - Senior; 31 Brian Lainhart - Junior; 33 Calvin Taylor - Junior; 37 Kirk Belgrave - Senior; 38 Dan Hartman - Junior; 39 Corey Cox - Junior; 43 J.J. Pankewicz - (redshirt) Sophomore; Punters: 46 Matt Rinehart - Sophomore; 47 Jake Kilroy - Senior; Kickers: 41 Will Kandray - Junior; 45 Freddy Cortez - Freshman; 98 Nate Reed - Senior; Long snappers: 62 Trip Ison - (redshirt) Freshman; 63 Alex Thomasson - Sophomore; 68 Vinny Matarazzo - Junior; Other Players: 15 Zack Gonosz - Freshman
† Starter at position * Injured; will not play in 2009.

== Coaching staff ==
Name	Position	Year at school
Doug Martin	Head coach	6th
Craig Aukerman	Linebackers coach	1st
Matt Edwards	Defensive ends coach	4th
Larry McDaniel	Interior defensive linemen coach	7th
Jerry McManus	Assistant head coach Running backs coach	5th
Richard McNutt	Cornerbacks coach	1st
Reno Ferri	Recruiting coordinator Running backs coach	6th
A.J. Pratt	Offensive coordinator Wide receivers coach	10th
Pete Rekstis	Defensive coordinator Safeties coach	6th
Terry Tilghman	Offensive line coach	4th
Zane Vance	Recruiting coordinator Tight ends coach	6th
Joe Coniglio	Defensive graduate assistant	1st

== Game summaries ==
=== Coastal Carolina ===
	1	2	3	4	Total
Chanticleers	0	0	0	0	0
Golden Flashes	2	0	7	9	18

Scoring summary

1st Quarter

- 04:36 KENT Hogan Safety 2-0 KENT

2nd Quarter

3rd Quarter

- 07:49 KENT Flowers 5-yard run (Cortez kick) 9-0 KENT

4th Quarter

- 11:57 KENT Jarvis 4-yard run (Cortez kick) 16-0 KENT
- 03:42 KENT Team Safety 18-0 KENT

=== Boston College ===
	1	2	3	4	Total
Golden Flashes	0	0	0	7	7
Eagles	14	10	10	0	34

=== Iowa State ===
	1	2	3	4	Total
Cyclones	17	10	7	0	34
Golden Flashes	7	0	0	7	14

Scoring summary

1st Quarter

- 11:56 ISU Mahoney 20-yard field goal 3-0 ISU
- 08:45 KENT Archer 44-yard pass from Keith (Cortez kick) 3-7 KENT
- 04:57 ISU Williams 22-yard pass from Arnaud (Mahoney kick) 10-7 ISU
- 02:52 ISU Arnaud 9-yard run (Mahoney kick) 17-7 ISU

2nd Quarter

- 12:42 ISU Arnaud 3-yard run (Mahoney kick) 24-7 ISU
- 01:49 ISU Mahoney 37-yard field goal 27-7 ISU

3rd Quarter

- 10:10 ISU Robinson 15-yard run (Mahoney kick) 34-7 ISU

4th Quarter

- 06:43 KENT McBryde 8-yard pass from Keith (Cortez kick) 34-14 ISU

=== Miami (OH) ===
	1	2	3	4	Total
Redhawks	3	7	6	3	19
Golden Flashes	6	13	7	3	29

Scoring summary

1st Quarter

- 4:48 MIAMI Cook 28-yard field goal 3-0 MIAMI
- 4:34 KENT Bowman 92-yard kickoff return (Cortez kick failed) 3-6 KENT

2nd Quarter

- 13:18 KENT Archer 28-yard run (Cortez kick) 3-13 KENT
- 7:49 KENT Cortez 37-yard field goal 3-16 KENT
- 2:35 KENT Cortez 42-yard field goal 3-19 KENT
- 0:04 MIAMI Rogers 9-yard pass from Dysert (Cook kick) 10-19 KENT

3rd Quarter

- 5:54 KENT Konz 56-yard pass from Keith (Cortez kick) 10-26 KENT
- 2:52 MIAMI Merriweather 1-yard run (Dysert pass failed) 16-26 KENT

4th Quarter

- 1:19 Cortez 34-yard field goal 19-26 KENT

=== Baylor ===
	1	2	3	4	Total
Golden Flashes	7	0	6	2	15
Bears	7	14	7	3	31

=== Bowling Green ===
	1	2	3	4	Total
Falcons	0	17	0	19	36
Golden Flashes	14	0	14	7	35

Scoring summary

1st Quarter

- 13:12 KENT Kirkland 86-yard run (Cortez kick) 0-7 KENT
- 03:12 KENT Rainey 82-yard blocked field goal return (Cortez kick) 0-14 KENT

2nd Quarter

- 12:14 BGSU Hodges 11-yard pass from Sheehan (Norsic kick) 7-12 KENT
- 07:10 BGSU Barnes 8-yard pass from Sheehan (Norsic kick) 14-14
- 01:45 BGSU Norsic 21-yard field goal 17-14 BGSU

3rd Quarter

- 10:58 KENT Archer 3-yard pass from Keith (Cortez kick) 17-21 KENT
- 03:44 KENT Terry 12-yard run (Cortez kick) 17-28 KENT

4th Quarter

- 13:37 BGSU Barnes 2-yard pass from Sheehan (Sheehan pass failed) 23-28 KENT
- 12:08 KENT Terry 3-yard run (Cortez kick) 23-35 KENT
- 04:29 BGSU Barnes 45-yard pass from Sheehan (Norsic kick) 30-35 KENT
- 00:05 BGSU Sheehan 9-yard run (Sheehan rush failed) 36-35 BGSU

=== Eastern Michigan ===
	1	2	3	4	Total
Golden Flashes	14	0	7	7	28
Eagles	6	0	0	0	6

=== Ohio ===
	1	2	3	4	Total
Golden Flashes	0	3	3	14	20
Bobcats	3	0	0	8	11

Scoring summary

1st Quarter

- 7:40 OHIO Weller 22-yard field goal 0-3 OHIO

2nd Quarter

- 4:44 KENT Cortez 30-yard field goal 3-3

3rd Quarter

- 5:14 KENT Cortez 26-yard field goal 6-3 KENT

4th Quarter

- 10:14 KENT Goode 3-yard pass from Keith (Cortez kick) 13-3 KENT
- 7:02 KENT Goode 15-yard pass from Keith (Cortez kick) 20-3 KENT
- 2:18 OHIO Brazill 87-yard punt return (Caldwell pass from Jones) 20-11 KENT

=== Western Michigan ===
	1	2	3	4	Total
Broncos	0	7	0	7	14
Golden Flashes	3	10	7	6	26

Scoring summary

1st quarter

- 8:57 KENT Cortez 24-yard field goal 0-3 KENT

2nd Quarter

- 11:22 WMU Ponder 2-yard pass from Hiller (Potter kick) 7-3 WMU
- 8:17 KENT Cortez 39-yard field goal 7-6 WMU
- 2:36 KENT Goode 34-yard pass from Spencer (Cortez kick) 7-13 KENT

3rd Quarter

- 12:01 KENT Goode 19-yard pass from Keith (Cortez kick) 7-20 KENT

4th Quarter

- 8:31 WMU Arnheim 9-yard pass from Hiller (Potter kick) 14-20 KENT
- 5:35 KENT Terry 15-yard run (Keith pass failed) 14-26 KENT

=== Akron ===
	1	2	3	4	Total
Golden Flashes	3	10	0	7	20
Zips	7	7	7	7	28

=== Temple ===
	1	2	3	4	Total
Golden Flashes	3	7	0	3	13
Owls	0	9	24	14	47

=== Buffalo ===
	1	2	3	4	Total
Bulls					0
Golden Flashes					0
