= Venice High School (Florida) =

American public high school

Coordinates: 27.093389°N 82.4400964°W

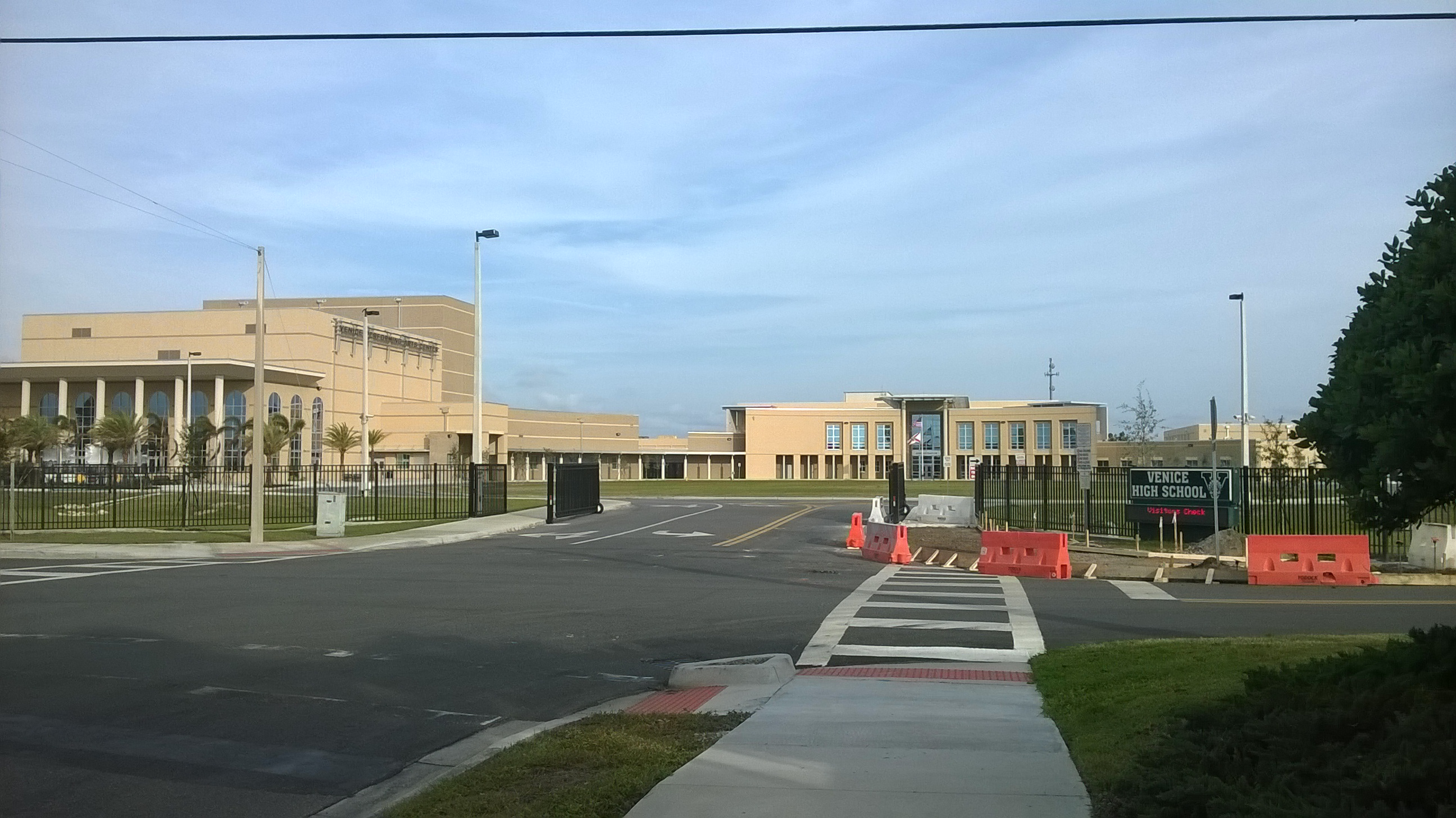

Location
- 1 Indian Avenue; Venice, Florida 34285; United States

Information
- Type: Public high school
- Motto: Home of the Indians
- Established: 1950
- Principal: Zoltan Kerestely
- Teaching staff: 121.00 (FTE)
- Enrollment: 2,562 (2023-2024)
- Student to teacher ratio: 21.17
- Campus: Urban
- Color: Green White
- Mascot: Indian
- Website: Official website

Venice High School is a secondary school located in Venice, Florida for grades 9–12.

== History ==
Venice High School was built in the late 1940s in Venice, Florida. The high school (grades 9–12) opened in 1956 with John E. Davis as its first principal. Venice Junior High (grades 6–8) opened sometime in 1959 when the student body outgrew the high school. The original buildings remained unchanged until 2012, when the high school and junior high were demolished (the original gymnasium and Powell–Davis Stadium remained) to build the existing facility. The campus was completed in 2014, including a new music suite housing the chorus and band and a city-mandated performing arts center.

== Programs ==
Featured programs include Career Technical Education: PC Support, Health Options, Digital Design, Early Childhood, Culinary Arts, Engineering, and Business Entrepreneurial pathways.

Venice High School offers the International Baccalaureate (IB) Program, which is an academically focused curriculum for students ages sixteen to eighteen (grades 11 and 12) preparing to enter university.

== Venice Performing Arts Center ==
Attached to Venice High School is the Venice Performing Arts Center (VPAC). This building includes the performing arts classes, which include band, orchestra, acting, and chorus.

The VPAC offers an apprenticeship program for Venice High School juniors and seniors, where they can gain theater and job experience while helping the community.

== Student demographics ==
Venice High School enrolls over 2,000 students annually, compared to the state average of 750 for K-12 schools.

== Competitive teams ==
Venice is known for its athletics programs, including state volleyball championships (1998, 2005, 2012, 2014, 2018) and baseball (2007, 2012, 2013, 2015, 2018, 2019). Venice's football program, coached by John Peacock, has been recognized as one of the best teams in the state, making several state championship appearances since their first in 2000 (7th in the nation) and winning a second in 2017.

  - Football State Champions - 2000, 2017, 2021, & 2024
  - Baseball State Champions - 2007, 2012, 2013, 2015, 2018, & 2019
  - Volleyball State Champions - 1998, 2005, 2012, 2014, 2017 & 2022
- Academic Olympics – Venice High School's Academic Olympics Team competes in the county and contributes to the Sarasota County All Star Team for the Commissioner's Academic Challenge (CAC) at the state level. The team most recently won the county championship in 2017.

== Accolades ==
In 2006, the Florida Department of Education named Venice High School an "A" school. In 2007, the school missed the 525 points needed for an "A" grade by 4 points, receiving a score of 521 to earn a "B" grade. The school has increased its graduation rate from 63.9% in 1999 to 84.7% in 2007. Its dropout rate is 1.6%.

== Notable alumni ==
- Dri Archer, NFL player
- Alexandra Barreto, actress
- Charles Brantley, college football player
- Trey Burton, NFL player
- Tyler Gauthier, NFL player
- Dalton Guthrie, MLB player
- Mark Guthrie, LSU Tiger Baseball Pitcher, former MLB player
- Orion Kerkering, MLB player
- Jon Knott, MLB player
- Forrest Lamp, NFL player
- Ryan Miller, MLB player
- Alvin Mitchell, football player
- Greg Pitts, actor
- Jack Voigt, LSU Tiger Baseball, Outfield and DH, MLB player and minor league coach
- Elliot Washington II, football player
- Winston Watkins Jr., college football player
- Malachi Wideman, football player
- Damon Wilson II, football player
- Clyde Everett Lassen, Medal of Honor Recipient, Commander, US Navy, Vietnam
