= Lou Harris (defensive back) =

American football player (born 1946)

No. 49
- Position: Defensive back

Personal information
- Born: March 25, 1946 (age 80); Washington, D.C.
- Listed height: 6 ft 0 in (1.83 m)
- Listed weight: 180 lb (82 kg)

Career information
- High school: Parker-Gray (Alexandria, Virginia)
- College: Kent State (1964–1967)
- NFL draft: 1968: 14th round, 363rd overall pick

Career history
- Pittsburgh Steelers (1968)
- Stats at Pro Football Reference

Louis Richard Harris (born March 25, 1946) is an American former professional football defensive back who played for the Pittsburgh Steelers of the National Football League (NFL). He played college football for the Kent State Golden Flashes and was selected by the Steelers in the 14th round of the 1968 NFL/AFL draft.

== Early life ==
Louis Richard Harris was born on March 25, 1946, in Washington, D.C.. He attended Parker-Gray High School in Alexandria, Virginia. He earned 12 varsity letters in high school; three letters each in football, baseball, basketball, and track. Harris earned all-conference honors in all four sports. He was inducted into the Parker-Gray High School Hall of Fame in 1989.

== College career ==
Harris enrolled at Kent State University to play college football for the Golden Flashes. He was on the freshman team in 1964 and was a three-year varsity letterman from 1965 to 1967. He earned All-Mid-American Conference honors in both 1966 and 1967 at defensive back, setting school single-season records both seasons with six interceptions the former year and seven interceptions the latter year. He also set the Kent State record for career interceptions with 19. He graduated with a bachelor's degree in industrial technology in 1970. Harris was inducted into Kent State's athletics hall of fame in 1994.

== Professional career ==
Harris was selected by the Pittsburgh Steelers in the 14th round, with the 363rd overall pick, of the 1968 NFL/AFL draft. He played in all 14 games, starting four, for the Steelers in 1968, returning six punts for 21 yards and one kick for 19 yards. He was waived on September 8, 1969.

== Personal life ==
Harris served in the United States Army Reserve. He was also a member of the Association of Energy Engineers.

== See also ==
- Kent State Golden Flashes football statistical leaders
