= Justin Parrish =

American football player (born 1984)

No. 9
- Position: Defensive lineman / linebacker

Personal information
- Born: May 10, 1984 (age 42)
- Listed height: 6 ft 2 in (1.88 m)
- Listed weight: 255 lb (116 kg)

Career information
- High school: Fairmont Heights (MD)
- College: Kent State
- NFL draft: 2006: undrafted

Career history
- Ohio Valley Greyhounds (2006); Wilkes-Barre/Scranton Pioneers (2009); Jacksonville Sharks (2010–2011); Pittsburgh Power (2012); Jacksonville Sharks (2013); Orlando Predators (2013); Jacksonville Sharks (2014)

Awards and highlights
- ArenaBowl champion (2011); First-team All-MAC (2006)

Career AFL statistics
- Tackles: 82
- Sacks: 21
- Forced fumbles: 6
- Fumble recoveries: 8
- Pass breakups: 5
- Stats at ArenaFan.com

Justin Parrish (born May 10, 1984) is an American former football defensive end. He played as a defensive end and linebacker for Kent State University. He was signed as a free agent by the Jacksonville Sharks in 2010. Parrish attended a workout with the Washington Redskins in 2006, but was not signed. Parrish began his professional career with the Ohio Valley Greyhounds of United Indoor Football.
