= Jose Davis =

American football player (born 1978)

No. 8
- Position: Quarterback

Personal information
- Born: July 29, 1978 (age 48); Bellaire, Ohio, U.S.
- Listed height: 6 ft 1 in (1.85 m)
- Listed weight: 195 lb (88 kg)

Career information
- High school: Bellaire (OH)
- College: Kent State
- NFL draft: 2000: undrafted

Career history
- Winnipeg Blue Bombers (2000–2001); Ohio Valley Greyhounds (2002); Indiana Firebirds (2003); Colorado Crush (2004–2005); Grand Rapids Rampage (2006); Kansas City Brigade (2007); Cleveland Gladiators (2008)

Awards and highlights
- ArenaBowl champion (2005)

Career CFL statistics
- Comp. / Att.: 10 / 26
- Passing yards: 105
- TD–INT: 0–1
- QB rating: 34.9

Career AFL statistics
- Comp. / Att.: 124 / 226
- Passing yards: 1,355
- TD–INT: 20–7
- QB rating: 82.01
- Rushing TD: 4
- Stats at ArenaFan.com

Jose Davis (born July 29, 1978) is an American former professional football quarterback who played in the Arena Football League (AFL) and Canadian Football League (CFL). Davis attended Kent State University, where he played football.

== Early life ==
Davis attended Bellaire High School in Bellaire, Ohio and was a student and a letterman in football, basketball and baseball. He was an All-State selection in both, football and basketball.

== College career ==
Davis attended Kent State University from 1996 to 1999 and was a three-year starter. He left the Kent State Golden Flashes holding every school career and single-game passing and total offense record in school history. He set a conference record in 1997 by throwing for 551 yards in a loss to Daunte Culpepper's Central Florida Knights. He also played with the Kent State men's basketball team during the 1997–98 season.

== Personal life ==
His brother, Nate, was the starting quarterback with the Ball State Cardinals from 2006 to 2008 and was drafted in the 2009 NFL draft by the San Francisco 49ers. In 2009, Jose Davis was named the coach at Bellaire High School, where he and Nate both played. He resigned after the 2013 season., but two months later agreed to become the head coach at Bellaire St. John HS.
