= Jack Williams (American football) =

American football player (born 1985)

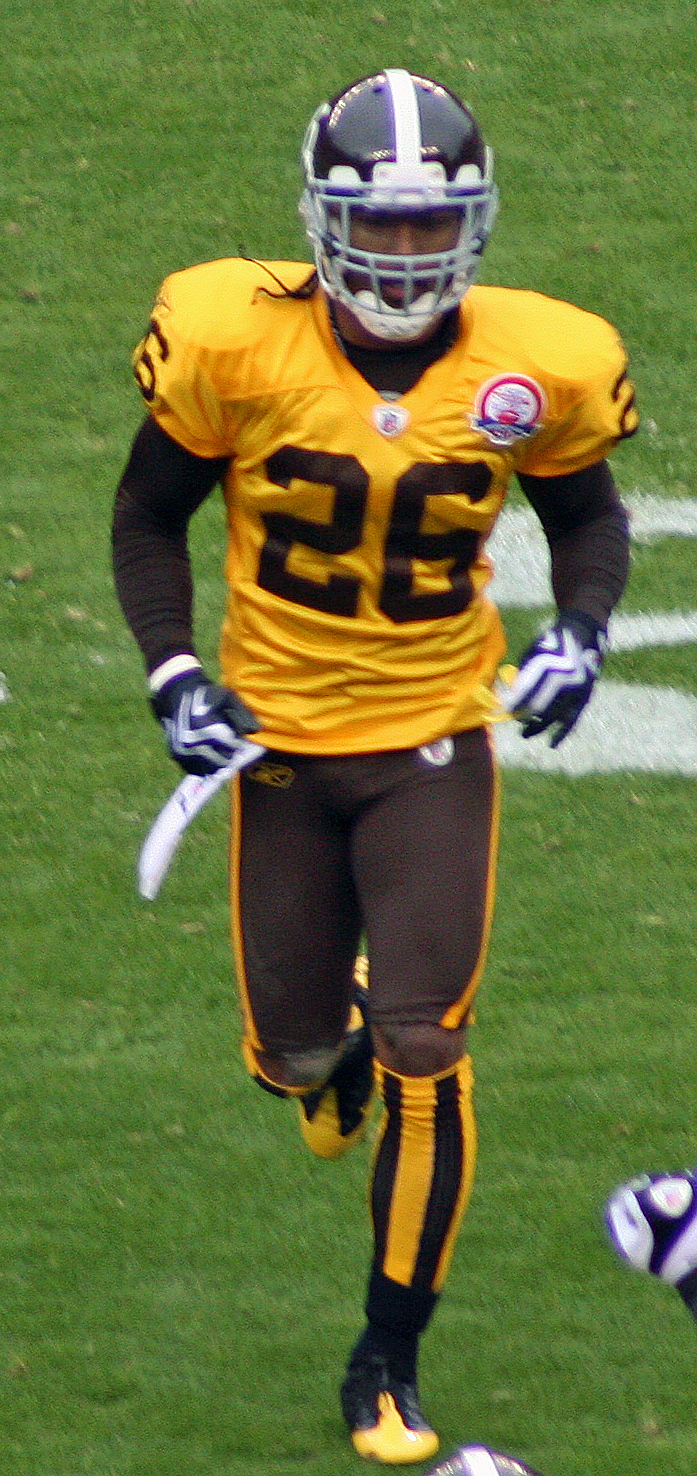
- Williams with the Denver Broncos in 2009

No. 26, 42, 33
- Position: Cornerback

Personal information
- Born: March 27, 1985 (age 41); Norfolk, Virginia, U.S.
- Listed height: 5 ft 8 in (1.73 m)
- Listed weight: 181 lb (82 kg)

Career information
- High school: Booker T. Washington (Norfolk)
- College: Kent State
- NFL draft: 2008: 4th round, 119th overall pick

Career history
- Denver Broncos (2008–2009); Detroit Lions (2009–2010); Chicago Rush (2012)*; Las Vegas Locomotives (2012)
- * Offseason or practice squad member only

Awards and highlights
- Second-team All-MAC (2007)

Career NFL statistics
- Total tackles: 26
- Fumble recoveries: 1
- Pass deflections: 3
- Stats at Pro Football Reference

Jack Williams (born March 27, 1985) is an American former professional football player who was a cornerback in the National Football League (NFL). He was selected 119th overall by the Denver Broncos in the fourth round of the 2008 NFL draft. He played college football for the Kent State Golden Flashes.

He also played for the Detroit Lions.
