= Eugene Baker (wide receiver) =

American football player (born 1976)

No. 5, 15, 80
- Position: Wide receiver

Personal information
- Born: March 18, 1976 (age 50); Monroeville, Pennsylvania, U.S.
- Listed height: 6 ft 2 in (1.88 m)
- Listed weight: 183 lb (83 kg)

Career information
- High school: Shady Side Academy (Pittsburgh, Pennsylvania)
- College: Kent State
- NFL draft: 1999: 5th round, 164th overall pick

Career history
- Atlanta Falcons (1999–2001); Buffalo Bills (2001)*; St. Louis Rams (2002)*; Carolina Panthers (2003–2005); New England Patriots (2005); Pittsburgh Steelers (2006)*; Toronto Argonauts (2007)*; Erie RiverRats (2008); Wheeling Wildcats (2009)
- * Offseason or practice squad member only

Awards and highlights
- First-team All-MAC (1997)

Career NFL statistics
- Receptions: 7
- Receiving yards: 118
- Stats at Pro Football Reference

Eugene Keith Baker (born March 18, 1976) is an American former professional football player who was a wide receiver in the National Football League (NFL). He played college football for the Kent State Golden Flashes before playing in the NFL for the Atlanta Falcons and Carolina Panthers. He was listed at 6 ft 1 in. and 167 pounds.

== Early life and college ==
Born in Monroeville, Pennsylvania, on March 18, 1976, Baker is an alumnus of Shady Side Academy, an independent private K-12 school in Pittsburgh. At Shady Side Academy, he lettered four times in football and three times in both baseball and basketball.

He then went on to play at Kent State University.

== Professional career ==
Baker was selected from Kent State during the 1999 NFL draft by the Atlanta Falcons. He played for four seasons with the team on its active roster and practice squad, and then spent time on the practice squads of the Buffalo Bills and the St. Louis Rams before signing with the Carolina Panthers in 2003.

A player in the New England Patriots preseason training camp last year, he was released before the regular season. In addition, he played in NFL Europe as a wide receiver for the Berlin Thunder.

On April 6, 2006, the Pittsburgh Steelers signed Baker to a one-year deal but released him on August 14 of that same year. On February 16, 2007, Baker signed with the Toronto Argonauts of the Canadian Football League but he became a subsequent training camp cut on June 18, 2007.

On June 3, 2008, he joined the Erie RiverRats of the AIFA.

On February 16, 2009, he signed with the Wheeling Wildcats of the CIFL.

On February 17, 2010, he returned to Kent State University as an assistant coach under head coach Doug Martin.

== See also ==
- List of NCAA major college football yearly receiving leaders
