= Dri Archer =

American football player (born 1991)

No. 13
- Positions: Running back, return specialist

Personal information
- Born: August 9, 1991 (age 35); Tampa, Florida, U.S.
- Listed height: 5 ft 8 in (1.73 m)
- Listed weight: 173 lb (78 kg)

Career information
- High school: Venice (Venice, Florida)
- College: Kent State (2009–2013)
- NFL draft: 2014: 3rd round, 97th overall pick

Career history
- Pittsburgh Steelers (2014–2015); New York Jets (2016)*; Buffalo Bills (2016)*
- * Offseason or practice squad member only

Awards and highlights
- MAC Special Teams Player of the Year (2012); Consensus All-American (2012); First-team All-MAC (2012)

Career NFL statistics
- Rushing attempts: 10
- Rushing yards: 40
- Receptions: 7
- Receiving yards: 23
- Stats at Pro Football Reference

Adrion Dante "Dri" Archer (born August 9, 1991) is an American former professional football player who was a running back and return specialist for the Pittsburgh Steelers of the National Football League (NFL). He played college football for the Kent State Golden Flashes, earning consensus All-American honors on 2012. He was selected by the Steelers in the third round of the 2014 NFL draft. He was also a member of the New York Jets and Buffalo Bills.

== Early life ==
Archer attended Venice High School, where he was a member of the basketball, football, and track teams. In track, he finished second in the 100 meters final of state track meet in his first full season of running (behind World Class sprinter Dentarius Locke and ahead of third place Denard Robinson), with a time of 10.49 seconds. He also ran the 200 meters in 21.46 seconds.

As a senior, he was named to the all-area first-team in football. He helped Venice High School win two district titles.

College recruiting
Name	Hometown	School	Height	Weight	40^{‡}	Commit date
Dri Archer; RB	Venice, Florida	Venice High School	5 ft 7 in (1.70 m)	160 lb (73 kg)	4.6	Jan 23, 2009
Dri Archer; RB	Recruit ratings: Scout: Rivals: (NR)					
Overall recruit ranking: Scout: – (RB) Rivals: – (RB), – (FL) ESPN: – (RB)
Note: In many cases, Scout, Rivals, 247Sports, On3, and ESPN may conflict in their listings of height and weight.; In these cases, the average was taken. ESPN grades are on a 100-point scale.; Sources: "Kent State Football Commitment List (23)". Rivals.; "Kent State College Football Recruiting Commits". Scout.; "ESPN". ESPN.; "Scout.com Team Recruiting Rankings". Scout.; "2009 Team Ranking". Rivals.com.

== College career ==
Archer was offered track scholarships from both Clemson and Arkansas. Kent State was the only school to offer him a football scholarship where he elected to attend. As a freshman at Kent State University, in 2009, he played in 11 games as a wide receiver/running back and had 246 rushing yards and 231 receiving yards. The following season, he had 140 rushing yards and 75 receiving yards. Before the 2011 season, Archer was ruled ineligible for academic reasons.

In 2012, Archer had 1,429 rushing yards, 16 rushing touchdowns, 561 receiving yards, and four receiving touchdowns. His 24 total touchdowns led the Mid-American Conference (MAC) and set a single-season school record. Against Ball State, Archer had a 99-yard kick return for a touchdown and set a career-high with 350 all-purpose yards. Against Eastern Michigan, he had a rushing touchdown, a receiving touchdown, and a kick return touchdown. Against Army, he had 222 rushing yards, a rushing touchdown, and a passing touchdown. Archer was named the MAC Special Teams Player of the Year. He made the All-MAC first-team as a running back and kick returner. He was also a finalist for the Paul Hornung Award. Archer was a consensus All-American.

=== Statistics ===
		Rushing							Receiving			Kickoff returns					Punt returns				
Season	Team	GS	GP	Att	Yds	Avg	TD	Long	Rec	Yds	TD	Att	Yds	Avg	TD	Long	Att	Yds	Avg	TD	Long
2009	Kent State	0	11	58	246	4.2	1	28	19	231	3	11	266	24.2	0	77	0	0	–	0	0
2010	Kent State	0	10	40	140	3.5	1	17	16	75	1	22	451	20.5	0	39	5	12	2.4	0	16
2012	Kent State	14	14	159	1,429	9.0	16	87	39	561	4	16	591	36.9	3	99	1	−4	−4	0	−4
2013	Kent State	10	10	68	527	7.8	6	74	25	327	4	2	128	64.0	1	100	0	0	–	0	–
	Totals	24	45	325	2,342	7.2	24	87	99	1,194	12	51	1,436	28.2	4	100	6	8	1.3	0	16

== Professional career ==
=== Pre-draft ===
Pre-draft measurables
Height	Weight	Arm length	Hand span	40-yard dash	10-yard split	20-yard split	20-yard shuttle	Three-cone drill	Vertical jump	Broad jump	Bench press	Wonderlic
5 ft 7 3/4 in (1.72 m)	173 lb (78 kg)	31 in (0.79 m)	8 7/8 in (0.23 m)	4.26 s	1.47 s	2.34 s	4.06 s	6.86 s	38 in (0.97 m)	10 ft 2 in (3.10 m)	20 reps	19
All values from NFL Combine

At the NFL Scouting Combine, Archer ran the 40-yard dash in 4.26 seconds, which is the fifth-fastest time ever recorded since the NFL began electronic timing.

=== Pittsburgh Steelers ===
He was drafted by the Pittsburgh Steelers in the 3rd round with the 97th overall pick in the 2014 NFL draft.

On September 7, 2014, Archer made his NFL debut against the Cleveland Browns. In his rookie season, Archer totaled ten carries for 40 yards and seven receptions for 23 yards to go along with occasional kickoff return duties in 12 games.

In 2015, Archer saw more action in the kick return game but did not factor into the offense. He finished with 14 kickoff returns for 324 net yards for a 25.29 average.

On November 5, 2015, Archer was waived by the Steelers.

=== New York Jets ===
On February 3, 2016, Archer signed a reserve/future contract with the New York Jets. On May 9, 2016, Archer was waived by the Jets.

=== Buffalo Bills ===
Archer was claimed off waivers by the Buffalo Bills on May 10, 2016. When he failed to report to the team, he was placed on the reserve/did not report list on May 18, 2016.

== See also ==
- List of college football yearly rushing leaders
