= Larry Poole (American football) =

American football player (born 1952)

No. 38, 39
- Position: Running back

Personal information
- Born: July 31, 1952 (age 74); Akron, Ohio, U.S.
- Listed height: 6 ft 1 in (1.85 m)
- Listed weight: 195 lb (88 kg)

Career information
- High school: Garfield (OH)
- College: Kent State
- NFL draft: 1975: 9th round, 213th overall pick

Career history
- Cleveland Browns (1975–1977); Houston Oilers (1978)

Career NFL statistics
- Rushing attempts: 133
- Rushing yards: 588
- Rushing TDs: 2
- Stats at Pro Football Reference

Larry Eugene Poole (born July 31, 1952) is an American former professional football player who was a running back in the National Football League (NFL). He played college football for the Kent State Golden Flashes and was selected by the Cleveland Browns in the ninth round of the 1975 NFL draft with the 213th overall pick.
