= Coastal Athletic Association Football Conference =

American college football conference

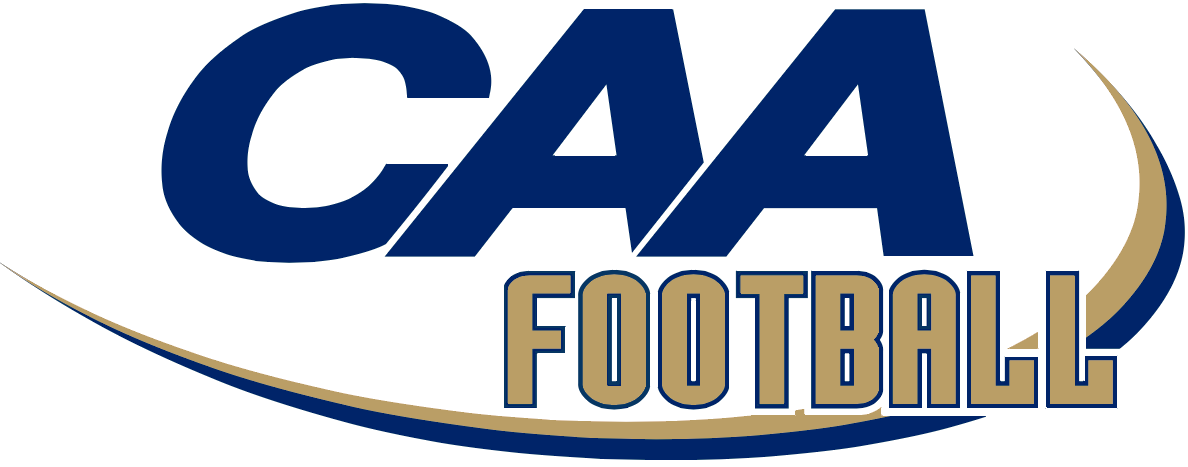
- Formerly: Colonial Athletic Association Football Conference
- Conference: NCAA
- Founded: 2007
- Sports fielded: 1; men's: 1 (football)
- Division: Division I
- Subdivision: FCS
- No. of teams: 13
- Headquarters: Richmond, Virginia
- Region: East Coast
- Website: caasports.com

Locations
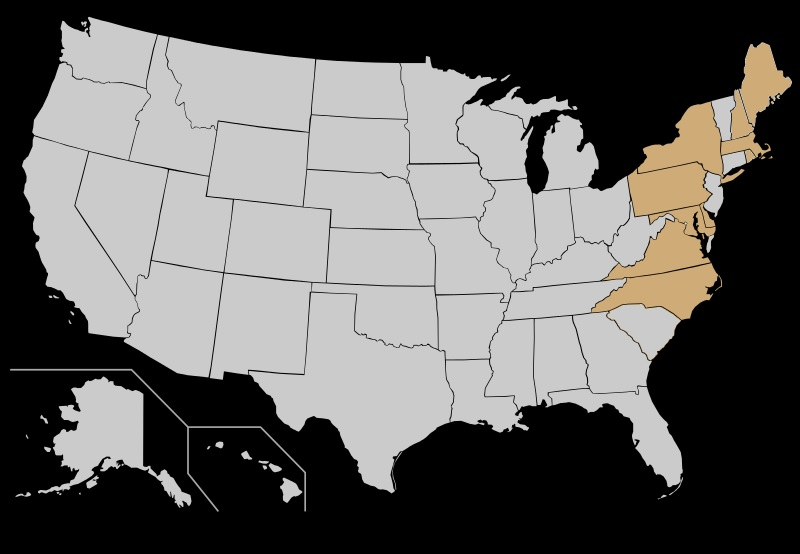

The Coastal Athletic Association Football Conference, formerly the Colonial Athletic Association Football Conference, branded as CAA Football, is a collegiate athletic conference affiliated with the NCAA's Division I whose full members are located in East Coast states, from Maine to North Carolina. Most of its members are public universities, and the conference is headquartered in Richmond, Virginia. The conference is run by the same administration as the multisport conference Coastal Athletic Association (CAA; formerly the Colonial Athletic Association) but is legally a different entity.

== History ==
CAA Football was formed in 2005, although it did not begin play until 2007, as a separate conference independent of the CAA, but administered by the CAA front office. In the 2004–05 academic year, the CAA had five member schools that sponsored football, all of them as football-only members of the Atlantic 10 Conference. In 2005, Northeastern accepted the CAA's offer of membership, giving the CAA the six football-playing members it needed under NCAA rules to organize a football conference. At that time, the CAA announced it would launch its new football conference in 2007. Next, the CAA invited the University of Richmond to become a football-only member effective in 2007. Once UR accepted the offer, this left the A10 football conference with only five members, less than the six required under NCAA rules. As a result, the remaining A10 football programs all decided to join the CAA for football only, ending A10 football. Since the CAA football conference had the same members as the A10 the previous year, it can be said that the CAA football conference is the A10 football conference under new management.

The CAA football conference's earliest roots are in the New England Conference, founded in 1938 by four state-supported universities in that region plus Northeastern; three of the public schools are currently in CAA Football. However, neither the multi-sports CAA nor CAA Football includes the New England Conference in CAA Football history. After the departure of Northeastern in 1945, the remaining members joined New England's other land-grant colleges, Massachusetts State College (now the University of Massachusetts Amherst) and the University of Vermont, to form the Yankee Conference under a new charter in 1946, with competition starting in 1947. That conference eventually dropped all sports other than football in 1975. Starting in the 1980s, it expanded to include many schools outside its original New England base. After the NCAA voted to limit the influence of single-sport conferences, the Yankee merged with the A-10 in 1997.

CAA Football went through many changes during the early 2010s with the loss of Georgia State, Massachusetts, and Old Dominion and the addition of Albany, Elon, and Stony Brook. Stability was maintained for a decade before the departure of James Madison in 2021 leading to the addition of Campbell, Hampton, Monmouth, North Carolina A&T, and Bryant from 2022 to 2024.

Coastal Athletic Association Football Conference
Location of CAA members:
CAA Football member

=== Timeline ===
- May 4, 2005 – CAA Football was formed with inaugural members Delaware, Hofstra, James Madison, Maine, New Hampshire, Northeastern, Rhode Island, Richmond, Towson, Massachusetts (UMass), Villanova, and William & Mary.
- May 31, 2006 – Old Dominion, at the time a member of the all-sports CAA, announced plans to add football for the 2009 season and join CAA Football in 2011.
- June 11, 2009 – Georgia State, at the time a member of the all-sports CAA, announced the addition of Football in 2011, and joining the CAA football conference in 2012.
- November 9, 2009 – Northeastern announced plans to drop football after the 2009 season.
- December 3, 2009 – Hofstra also announced that the university would no longer be sponsoring football.
- June 1, 2010 – Due to the reduction of the conference, CAA Football did not use the division format for the 2010 season.
- April 20, 2011 – UMass announced that it would transition to FBS beginning fall 2011, and would become a football-only member of the Mid-American Conference (MAC).
- April 7, 2012 – Georgia State began an FBS transition in advance of its 2013 move to the Sun Belt Conference.
- May 17, 2012 – Old Dominion announced its plans to join Conference USA and transition to FBS status for the 2013 season.
- August 7, 2012 – Albany and Stony Brook both accepted offers of membership in CAA Football for the 2013 season.
- May 23, 2013 – Elon announced that the school would become a member of CAA Football and the all-sports CAA for the 2014 season.
- November 6, 2021 – James Madison announced its departure for the Sun Belt Conference and upgrade to FBS. Originally, JMU was slated to play the 2022 season as an FCS Independent before joining the Sun Belt in 2023, but JMU ended up joining a year earlier.
- January 25, 2022 – Hampton and Monmouth accept invitations to join CAA Football and the all-sports CAA for the 2022 season. Stony Brook, which joined CAA Football in 2013, also becomes a member of the all-sports conference.
- February 22, 2022 – North Carolina A&T accepts an invitation to join CAA Football for the 2023 season, a year after joining the all-sports CAA.
- August 3, 2022 – Campbell also accepts an invitation to join both sides of the CAA for the 2023 season.
- July 20, 2023 – CAA Football changed its full name to the Coastal Athletic Association Football Conference.
- August 10, 2023 – Bryant accepts an invitation to join CAA Football for the 2024 season.
- November 28, 2023 – Delaware announced its plans to join Conference USA and transition to FBS status for the 2025 season.
- May 14, 2024 – Richmond announced its departure from the CAA to join the Patriot League as an associate member for football for the 2025 season.
- April 25, 2025 – William & Mary announced its departure from CAA Football to join the Patriot League as an associate member for football for the 2026 season. It will remain a member of the multi-sports CAA.
- June 5, 2025 – Villanova announced its departure from the CAA to join the Patriot League as an associate member for football for the 2026 season.
- July 22, 2025 – Sacred Heart is announced by CAA Football as a future member, starting with the 2026 season.

== Member institutions ==
=== Current members ===
Institution	Location	Founded	Joined	Type	Enrollment	Nickname	Colors|	Primary Conference
State University of New York at Albany	Albany, New York	1844	2013	Public	17,944	Great Danes		AmEast
Bryant University	Smithfield, Rhode Island	1863	2024	Private	3,751	Bulldogs		AmEast
Campbell University	Buies Creek, North Carolina	1887	2023	Private	5,622	Fighting Camels		CAA
Elon University	Elon, North Carolina	1889	2014	Private	6,991	Phoenix		CAA
Hampton University	Hampton, Virginia	1868	2022	Private (HBCU)	3,516	Pirates		CAA
University of Maine	Orono, Maine	1865	2007	Public	11,404	Black Bears		AmEast
Monmouth University	West Long Branch, New Jersey	1933	2022	Private	5,675	Hawks		CAA
University of New Hampshire	Durham, New Hampshire	1866	2007	Public	15,305	Wildcats		AmEast
North Carolina A&T State University	Greensboro, North Carolina	1891	2023	Public (HBCU)	13,332	Aggies		CAA
University of Rhode Island	Kingston, Rhode Island	1892	2007	Public	16,883	Rams		A-10
Sacred Heart University	Fairfield, Connecticut	1963	2026	Private	10,730	Pioneers		Metro
Stony Brook University	Stony Brook, New York	1957	2013	Public	26,782	Seawolves		CAA
Towson University	Towson, Maryland	1866	2007	Public	22,923	Tigers		CAA

=== Former members ===
Institution	Location	Founded	Joined	Left	Type	Enrollment	Nickname	Colors|	Subsequent Football Conference	Current Football Conference
University of Delaware	Newark, Delaware	1743	2007	2025	Public (Note: Delaware is officially chartered as a "privately-governed, state-assisted" institution. This status is broadly similar to that of New York State's statutory colleges, most of which are housed at Cornell University, or institutions in Pennsylvania's Commonwealth System of Higher Education.)	23,281	Fightin' Blue Hens		CUSA (FBS)	
Hofstra University	Hempstead, New York	1935	2007	2009	Private	10,871	Pride		none (dropped football)	
Georgia State University	Atlanta, Georgia	1913	2012	2013	Public	32,082	Panthers		Sun Belt (FBS)	
James Madison University	Harrisonburg, Virginia	1908	2007	2022	Public	21,227	Dukes		Sun Belt (FBS)	
University of Massachusetts	Amherst, Massachusetts	1863	2007	2012	Public	28,635	Minutemen		MAC (FBS)	
Northeastern University	Boston, Massachusetts	1898	2007	2009	Private	21,627	Huskies		none (dropped football)	
Old Dominion University	Norfolk, Virginia	1930	2011	2013	Public	24,932	Monarchs		CUSA (FBS)	Sun Belt (FBS)
University of Richmond	Richmond, Virginia	1830	2007	2025	Private	4,002	Spiders		Patriot League	
Villanova University	Villanova, Pennsylvania	1842	2007	2026	Private	11,023	Wildcats		Patriot League	
College of William & Mary	Williamsburg, Virginia	1693	2007	2026	Public	8,817	Tribe		Patriot League	

=== Membership timeline ===
Current members Former members Other Conference Other Conference

== Conference champions ==
*	Denotes a tie for regular season conference title
†	Denotes team failed to qualify for FCS Playoffs
**Bold** type	Denotes national champion in the same season

Year	Team(s)	Conference record	Overall record(s)	Head coach(es)
2007*	UMass; Richmond	7–1	10–3; 11–3	Don Brown; Dave Clawson
2008	James Madison	8–0	12–2	Mickey Matthews
2009*	Richmond; **Villanova**	7–1	11–2; **14–1**	Mike London; **Andy Talley**
2010*	Delaware; William & Mary	6–2	12–3; 8–4	K. C. Keeler; Jimmye Laycock
2011	Towson	7–1	9–3	Rob Ambrose
2012*	New Hampshire; Richmond†; Villanova; Towson†	6–2	8–3; 8–3; 8–3; 7–4	Sean McDonnell; Danny Rocco; Andy Talley; Rob Ambrose
2013	Maine	7–1	10–3	Jack Cosgrove
2014	New Hampshire	8–0	10–1	Sean McDonnell
2015*	James Madison; Richmond; William & Mary	6–2	9–2; 8–3; 8–3	Everett Withers; Danny Rocco; Jimmye Laycock
2016	**James Madison**	8–0	**14–1**	**Mike Houston**
2017	James Madison	8–0	14–1	Mike Houston
2018	Maine	7–1	10–4	Joe Harasymiak
2019	James Madison	8–0	14–2	Curt Cignetti
2020	Delaware	4–0	5−0	Danny Rocco
2021*	James Madison; Villanova	7–1	10–1; 9–2	Curt Cignetti; Mark Ferrante
2022*	New Hampshire; William & Mary	7–1	9–4; 11–2	Ricky Santos; Mike London
2023*	UAlbany; Richmond; Villanova	7–1	9–2; 8–3; 9–2	Greg Gattuso; Russ Huesman; Mark Ferrante
2024*	Richmond; Rhode Island	8–0; 7–1 (Note: CAA Football recognized Richmond and Rhode Island as co-champions because Rhode Island's only conference loss was to Delaware, which was ineligible for the FCS playoffs due to its transition to FBS.)	10–3; 11–3	Russ Huesman; Jim Fleming
2025	Rhode Island	8–0	11−2	Jim Fleming

=== All-time conference championships ===
School	Championships	Outright championships	Years
James Madison ‡	6	4	2008, 2015, **2016**, 2017, 2019, 2021
Richmond ‡	6	0	2007, 2009, 2012, 2015, 2023, 2024
Villanova ‡	4	0	**2009**, 2012, 2021, 2023
New Hampshire	3	1	2012, 2014, 2022
William & Mary ‡	3	0	2010, 2015, 2022
Maine	2	2	2013, 2018
Delaware ‡	2	1	2010, 2020^{a}
Towson	2	1	2011, 2012
Rhode Island	2	1	2024, 2025
UAlbany	1	0	2023
Massachusetts‡	1	0	2007
Bryant	0	0	0
Stony Brook	0	0	0
North Carolina A&T	0	0	0
Monmouth	0	0	0
Campbell	0	0	0
Elon	0	0	0
Hampton	0	0	0

Co-championships are designated by italics.

BOLD denotes the team won the National Championship

^{‡}Former member of CAA Football

- **^a**The CAA's 2020–21 NCAA Division I FCS football season was played in Spring 2021 due to the COVID-19 pandemic. Several teams opted out, and some games were canceled. The Delaware Fightin' Blue Hens completed the season with a 5-0 overall record, 4–0 in conference, and won the North Division title; the James Madison Dukes completed the season with a 5-0 overall record, 3–0 in conference, and won the South Division title. A vote of the CAA athletic directors, not including Delaware or James Madison, was held to determine a champion. The Delaware Fightin' Blue Hens were declared the 2020 CAA football champions as a result of this vote and were awarded the automatic qualifier for the FCS playoffs.

== NCAA FCS national championships ==
School	Championships	Finals appearances	Won	Lost
James Madison (Note: James Madison left CAA Football (and the multi-sports CAA) in 2022 to join the FBS Sun Belt Conference.)	2	4	2004, (Note: Won as a member of Atlantic 10 Conference football.) 2016	2017, 2019
Delaware (Note: Delaware left CAA Football (and the multi-sports CAA) in 2025 to join the FBS Conference USA.)	1	4	2003	1982, (Note: Delaware was an NCAA I-AA independent in the 1982 season.) 2007, 2010
Villanova (Note: Villanova left CAA Football in 2026 to become a football-only member of the Patriot League.)	1	1	2009	
UMass (Note: UMass left CAA Football in 2013 to became a football-only member of the Mid-American Conference. It later became an FBS independent before becoming a full MAC member in 2025.)	1	3	1998	1978, (Note: Appeared as a member of the Yankee Conference.) 2006
Richmond (Note: Richmond left CAA Football in 2025 to become a football-only member of the Patriot League.)	1	1	2008	
Towson	0	1		2013

== All-time NFL Draft selections ==
Year	Round	Selection	Player	Position	College	NFL team
2008	1	18	Joe Flacco	Quarterback	Delaware	Baltimore Ravens
2008	4	125	Arman Shields	Wide receiver	Richmond	Oakland Raiders
2008	5	149	Tim Hightower	Running back	Richmond	Arizona Cardinals
2008	6	207	Matt Sherry	Tight end	Villanova	Cincinnati Bengals
2009	3	73	Derek Cox	Cornerback	William & Mary	Jacksonville Jaguars
2009	4	125	Lawrence Sidbury	Defensive end	Richmond	Atlanta Falcons
2010	2	61	Vladimir Ducasse	Offensive tackle	UMass	New York Jets
2010	6	178	Arthur Moats	Defensive end	James Madison	Buffalo Bills
2010	6	184	Adrian Tracy	Linebacker	William & Mary	New York Giants
2010	6	203	Scotty McGee	Kick returner	James Madison	Jacksonville Jaguars
2010	7	234	Sean Lissemore	Defensive tackle	William & Mary	Dallas Cowboys
2011	2	49	Ben Ijalana	Offensive tackle	Villanova	Indianapolis Colts
2011	7	206	Justin Rogers	Cornerback	Richmond	Buffalo Bills
2012	4	98	Gino Gradkowski	Guard	Delaware	Baltimore Ravens
2012	4	133	Jerron McMillian	Safety	Maine	Green Bay Packers
2013	4	114	B. W. Webb	Cornerback	William & Mary	Dallas Cowboys
2013	4	116	Earl Watford	Guard	James Madison	Arizona Cardinals
2013	5	152	Cooper Taylor	Safety	Richmond	New York Giants
2013	7	241	Jared Smith	Defensive tackle	New Hampshire	Seattle Seahawks
2014	3	94	Terrance West	Running back	Towson	Cleveland Browns
2014	6	184	Kendall James	Cornerback	Maine	Minnesota Vikings
2015	5	171	Nick Boyle	Tight End	Delaware	Baltimore Ravens
2015	7	245	Tre McBride	Wide receiver	William & Mary	Tennessee Titans
2016	6	185	DeAndre Houston-Carson	Cornerback	William & Mary	Chicago Bears
2016	7	239	Trevor Bates	Linebacker	Maine	Indianapolis Colts
2017	2	59	Tanoh Kpassagnon	Defensive end	Villanova	Kansas City Chiefs
2017	7	236	Brad Seaton	Offensive tackle	Villanova	Tennessee Titans
2018	4	108	Kyle Lauletta	Quarterback	Richmond	New York Giants
2018	5	145	Bilal Nichols	Defensive tackle	Delaware	Chicago Bears
2018	6	192	Jamil Demby	Offensive tackle	Maine	Los Angeles Rams
2019	2	60	Nasir Adderley	Safety	Delaware	Los Angeles Chargers
2019	6	193	Oli Udoh	Offensive tackle	Elon	Minnesota Vikings
2019	7	227	Jimmy Moreland	Cornerback	James Madison	Washington Redskins
2020	5	171	Isaiah Coulter	Wide receiver	Rhode Island	Houston Texans
2020	7	231	Ben DiNucci	Quarterback	James Madison	Dallas Cowboys
2022	6	185	Christian Benford	Cornerback	Villanova	Buffalo Bills
2023	5	152	Colby Sorsdal	Offensive tackle	William & Mary	Detroit Lions
2024	6	208	Dylan Laube	Running back	New Hampshire	Las Vegas Raiders
2025	3	99	Charles Grant	Offensive tackle	William & Mary	Las Vegas Raiders

== Conference facilities ==
School	Football stadium	Capacity
Albany	Bob Ford Field at Tom & Mary Casey Stadium	8,500
Bryant	Beirne Stadium	5,500
Campbell	Barker-Lane Stadium	5,500
Elon	Rhodes Stadium	11,250
Hampton	Armstrong Stadium	10,000
Maine	Harold Alfond Sports Stadium	8,419
Monmouth	Kessler Field	4,600
New Hampshire	Wildcat Stadium	11,015
North Carolina A&T	Truist Stadium	21,500
Rhode Island	Meade Stadium	6,580
Sacred Heart	Campus Field	3,334
Stony Brook	Kenneth P. LaValle Stadium	12,300
Towson	Minnegan Field at Johnny Unitas Stadium	11,198
