= 2012 Georgia State Panthers football team =

American college football season

2012 Georgia State Panthers football
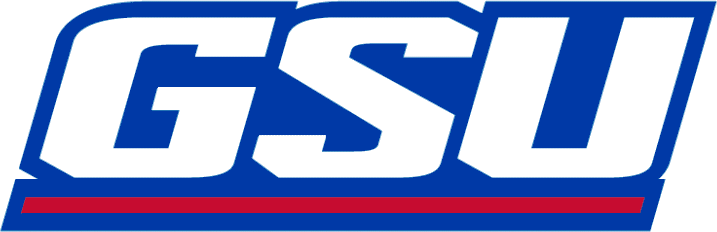
- Conference: Colonial Athletic Association
- Record: 1–10 (1–7 CAA)
- Head coach: Bill Curry (3rd season)
- Offensive coordinator: John Bond (3rd season)
- Offensive scheme: Spread option
- Defensive coordinator: Anthony Midget (1st season)
- Base defense: 3–4
- Home stadium: Georgia Dome

2012 Colonial Athletic Association football standings
	Conf.			Overall
Team	W		L	W		L
No. 6 Old Dominion ^	7	–	1	11	–	2
No. 18 Richmond +	6	–	2	8	–	3
No. 13 New Hampshire +^	6	–	2	8	–	4
No. 15 Villanova +^	6	–	2	8	–	4
No. 17 Towson +	6	–	2	7	–	4
No. 19 James Madison	5	–	3	7	–	4
Maine	4	–	4	5	–	6
Delaware	2	–	6	5	–	6
William & Mary	1	–	7	2	–	9
Rhode Island	0	–	8	0	–	11
Georgia State	0	–	0	1	–	10
+ – Conference co-champions; ^ – FCS playoff participant; Georgia State's conference record was 0–0, and it did not occupy a spot in the overall standings. Old Dominion was ineligible for the conference championship because of its announced departure for Conference USA in 2013.; Rankings from The Sports Network poll

The 2012 Georgia State Panthers football team represented Georgia State University in the 2012 NCAA Division I FCS football season. The Panthers were led by third year head coach Bill Curry and played their home games at the Georgia Dome. Georgia State was a full member of the Colonial Athletic Association (CAA), but announced on April 9, 2012 that it would return to the Sun Belt Conference, which it had left in 1981, in July 2013. In advance of this move, the Panthers began a transition to Division I FBS in 2012. As a result of these moves, the 2012 season was the first and only year that they competed in the CAA for football. Although not qualifying, they were ineligible for the FCS playoffs as a transitional FBS team. The Panthers finished the season 1–10, 1–7 in CAA play.

== Season summary ==
- The 2012 season was the first and only season that Georgia State participated as a member of the Colonial Athletic Association. Beginning 2013, the Panthers will compete as an FBS transitional team as a part of the Sun Belt Conference.
- During the August 30 season opener against South Carolina State University, sophomore punter Matt Hubbard made the equivalent of an FCS and FBS single game punting distance average record of 62.2 yards. However, due to GSU's reclassifying status, it is neither considered FBS nor FCS, and therefore the record does not count in either of those categories.
- This season marked Bill Curry's final year as a college football head coach. He was replaced by Trent Miles, former Indiana State head coach.

== Schedule ==
Date	Time	Opponent	Site	TV	Result	Attendance
August 30	7:30 p.m.	South Carolina State*	Georgia Dome; Atlanta, GA	CSS	L 6–33	18,921
September 8	4:00 p.m.	at No. 23 (FBS) Tennessee*	Neyland Stadium; Knoxville, TN	Tennessee PPV, ESPN3	L 13–51	87,821
September 15	6:00 p.m.	UTSA*	Georgia Dome; Atlanta, GA		L 14–38	11,496
September 22	3:30 p.m.	Richmond	Georgia Dome; Atlanta, GA		L 14–35	9,476
September 29	7:00 p.m.	at William & Mary	Zable Stadium; Williamsburg, VA	CSS	L 3–35	11,125
October 6	3:30 p.m.	No. 14 New Hampshire	Georgia Dome; Atlanta, GA		L 21–44	9,531
October 13	1:00 p.m.	at Rhode Island	Meade Stadium; Kingston, RI		W 41–7	6,013
October 20	3:30 p.m.	No. 24 Villanova^{†}	Georgia Dome; Atlanta, GA		L 24–49	12,136
October 27	3:30 p.m.	at No. 9 James Madison	Bridgeforth Stadium; Harrisonburg, VA		L 21–28	22,813
November 3	3:30 p.m.	No. 5 Old Dominion	Georgia Dome; Atlanta, GA		L 27–53	12,293
November 10	2:00 p.m.	at Maine	Alfond Stadium; Orono, ME		L 7–51	2,979
*Non-conference game; ^{†}Homecoming; Rankings from The Sports Network Poll released prior to the game; All times are in Eastern time

== Coaching staff ==
Name	Position	Seasons at Georgia St	Alma mater
Bill Curry	Head coach	2	Georgia Tech (1964)
George Pugh	Associate head coach, Wide receivers, Recruiting Coordinator	2	Alabama (1975)
Anthony Midget	Defensive coordinator, Safeties	2	Virginia Tech (1999)
John Bond	Offensive coordinator, Quarterbacks	2	Arkansas (1985)
Jason French	Cornerbacks, Outside linebackers	2	Murray State (2001)
Joe Hamilton	Running Backs	2	Georgia Tech (2008)
Craig Harmon	Tight Ends	2	Quincy (2002)
Mike Riddle	Offensive line	2	Kentucky (1999)
Chris Ward	Defensive tackles	2	Kentucky (1996)
Ryan Zimmerman	Defensive Ends	2	Piedmont College (2009)

Defensive coordinator John Thompson was hired by Arkansas State in February 2012. He was replaced by Anthony Midget, the former special teams coach.
