= 2012 Saint Francis Red Flash football team =

American college football season

2012 Saint Francis Red Flash football
- Conference: Northeast Conference
- Record: 5–6 (4–4 NEC)
- Head coach: Chris Villarrial (3rd season)
- Offensive coordinator: Eric Long
- Co-defensive coordinators: Scott Benzel; Jake Nulph
- Home stadium: DeGol Field

2012 Northeast Conference football standings
	Conf.			Overall
Team	W		L	W		L
No. 21 Wagner +^	7	–	1	9	–	4
Albany +	7	–	1	9	–	2
Monmouth	4	–	3	5	–	5
Saint Francis (PA)	4	–	4	5	–	6
Bryant	4	–	4	4	–	7
Robert Morris	3	–	5	4	–	7
Duquesne	3	–	5	5	–	6
Central Connecticut	2	–	5	2	–	8
Sacred Heart	1	–	7	2	–	9
+ – Conference co-champions; ^ – FCS playoff participant; Rankings from The Sports Network poll

The 2012 Saint Francis Red Flash football team represented Saint Francis University in the 2012 NCAA Division I FCS football season. They were led by third year head coach Chris Villarrial and played their home games at DeGol Field. They are a member of the Northeast Conference. They finished the season 5–6, 4–4 in NEC play to finish in a tie for fourth place.

== Schedule ==
Date	Time	Opponent	Site	TV	Result	Attendance
September 1	6:00 p.m.	at No. 5 James Madison*	Bridgeforth Stadium; Harrisonburg, VA		L 7–55	23,248
September 8	12:00 p.m.	Bryant	DeGol Field; Loretto, PA		W 39–28	1,024
September 15	1:00 p.m.	at Morehead State*	Jayne Stadium; Morehead, KY		W 57–23	5,856
September 22	7:00 p.m.	at No. 13 Towson*	Johnny Unitas Stadium; Towson, MD		L 17–46	9,828
September 29	1:00 p.m.	at Duquesne	Arthur J. Rooney Athletic Field; Pittsburgh, PA		L 21–24	2,641
October 6	12:00 p.m.	Robert Morris	DeGol Field; Loretto, PA		W 10–3	1,726
October 13	12:00 p.m.	at Albany	University Field; Albany, NY		L 13–36	6,852
October 20	12:00 p.m.	Wagner	DeGol Field; Loretto, PA		L 24–31	1,931
October 27	12:00 p.m.	at Central Connecticut	Arute Field; New Britain, CT		L 30–32	2,127
November 10	12:00 p.m.	at Monmouth	Kessler Field; West Long Branch, NJ	FCS, ESPN3	W 45–31	1,410
November 17	12:00 p.m.	Sacred Heart	DeGol Field; Loretto, PA		W 44–24	1,507
*Non-conference game; Rankings from The Sports Network Poll released prior to the game; All times are in Eastern time
