= 2012 Bryant Bulldogs football team =

American college football season

2012 Bryant Bulldogs football
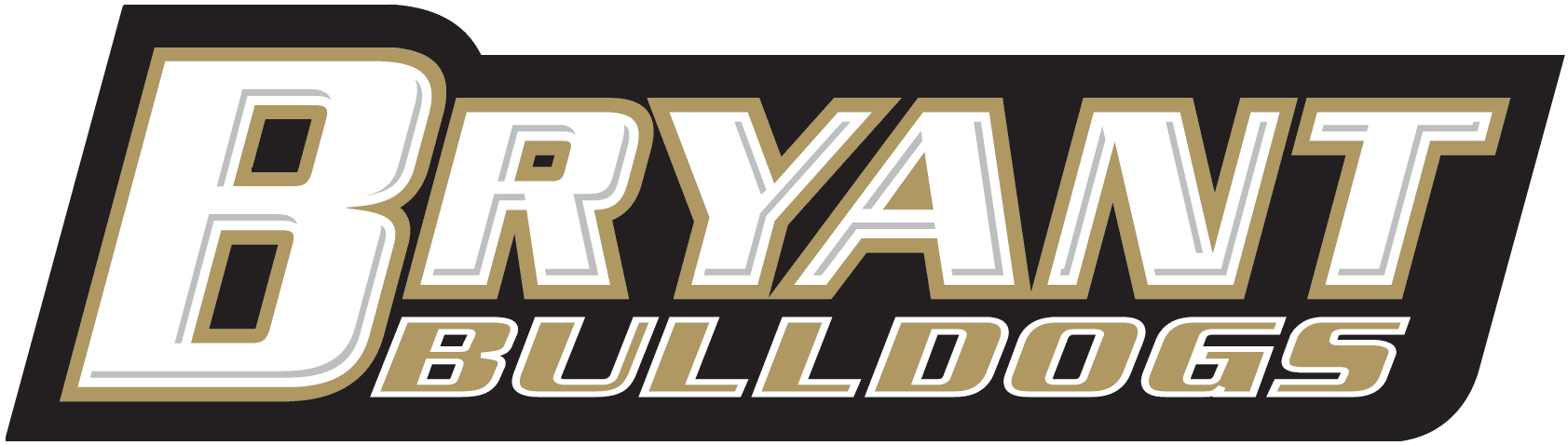
- Conference: Northeast Conference
- Record: 4–7 (4–4 NEC)
- Head coach: Marty Fine (9th season)
- Defensive coordinator: Greg Gigantino (6th season)
- Home stadium: Bulldog Stadium

2012 Northeast Conference football standings
	Conf.			Overall
Team	W		L	W		L
No. 21 Wagner +^	7	–	1	9	–	4
Albany +	7	–	1	9	–	2
Monmouth	4	–	3	5	–	5
Saint Francis (PA)	4	–	4	5	–	6
Bryant	4	–	4	4	–	7
Robert Morris	3	–	5	4	–	7
Duquesne	3	–	5	5	–	6
Central Connecticut	2	–	5	2	–	8
Sacred Heart	1	–	7	2	–	9
+ – Conference co-champions; ^ – FCS playoff participant; Rankings from The Sports Network poll

The 2012 Bryant Bulldogs football team represented Bryant University as a member of the Northeast Conference (NEC) during the 2012 NCAA Division I FCS football season. Led by ninth-year head coach Marty Fine, the Bulldogs compiled an overall record of 4–7 with a mark of 4–4 in conference play, tying for fourth place in the NEC. Bryant played home games at Bulldog Stadium in Smithfield, Rhode Island.

== Schedule ==
Date	Time	Opponent	Site	TV	Result	Attendance
September 1	3:00 p.m.	Marist*	Bulldog Stadium; Smithfield, RI		L 10–35	3,812
September 8	12:00 p.m.	at Saint Francis (PA)	DeGol Field; Loretto, PA		L 28–39	1,024
September 15	1:00 p.m.	No. 25 Maine*	Bulldog Stadium; Smithfield, RI		L 7–51	2,418
September 22	1:00 p.m.	Duquesne^{†}	Bulldog Stadium; Smithfield, RI		L 21–35	2,958
September 29	1:00 p.m.	at Wagner	Wagner College Stadium; Staten Island, NY		L 21–31	2,037
October 6	12:00 p.m.	Albany	Bulldog Stadium; Smithfield, RI	FCS, Cox RI, ESPN3	L 14–31	1,219
October 13	1:00 p.m.	Robert Morris	Bulldog Stadium; Smithfield, RI		W 38–35	3,682
October 20	1:00 p.m.	at Monmouth	Kessler Field; West Long Branch, NJ		W 27–24	4,185
November 3	1:00 p.m.	Sacred Heart	Bulldog Stadium; Smithfield, RI		W 34–14	1,634
November 10	12:00 p.m.	at Central Connecticut	Arute Field; New Britain, CT		W 28–25	3,110
November 17	1:00 p.m.	at Bucknell*	Christy Mathewson–Memorial Stadium; Lewisburg, PA		L 21–24	1,718
*Non-conference game; ^{†}Homecoming; Rankings from The Sports Network Poll released prior to the game; All times are in Eastern time
