= 2012 Rhode Island Rams football team =

American college football season

2012 Rhode Island Rams football
- Conference: Colonial Athletic Association
- Record: 0–11 (0–8 CAA)
- Head coach: Joe Trainer (4th season)
- Offensive coordinator: Roy Istvan (2nd season)
- Defensive coordinator: Brian Vaganek (1st season)
- Home stadium: Meade Stadium

2012 Colonial Athletic Association football standings
	Conf.			Overall
Team	W		L	W		L
No. 6 Old Dominion ^	7	–	1	11	–	2
No. 18 Richmond +	6	–	2	8	–	3
No. 13 New Hampshire +^	6	–	2	8	–	4
No. 15 Villanova +^	6	–	2	8	–	4
No. 17 Towson +	6	–	2	7	–	4
No. 19 James Madison	5	–	3	7	–	4
Maine	4	–	4	5	–	6
Delaware	2	–	6	5	–	6
William & Mary	1	–	7	2	–	9
Rhode Island	0	–	8	0	–	11
Georgia State	0	–	0	1	–	10
+ – Conference co-champions; ^ – FCS playoff participant; Georgia State's conference record was 0–0, and it did not occupy a spot in the overall standings. Old Dominion was ineligible for the conference championship because of its announced departure for Conference USA in 2013.; Rankings from The Sports Network poll

The 2012 Rhode Island Rams football team represented the University of Rhode Island in the 2012 NCAA Division I FCS football season. They were led by fourth year head coach Joe Trainer and played their home games at Meade Stadium. They were a member of the Colonial Athletic Association. They finished the season 0–11, 0–8 in CAA play to finish in last place.

By finishing the season with zero wins, the Rams lost a school-record 13 straight contests dating back to the final two games of the 2011 season. It is also their first winless season since 1949 when they went 0–8.

== Schedule ==
Date	Time	Opponent	Site	TV	Result	Attendance
September 8	1:00 pm	at Monmouth*	Kessler Field; West Long Branch, NJ		L 6–41	2,986
September 15	3:30 pm	at Villanova	Villanova Stadium; Villanova, PA	CSN	L 10–31	10,513
September 22	1:00 pm	James Madison	Meade Stadium; Kingston, RI		L 7–32	4,203
September 29	3:30 pm	at Bowling Green*	Doyt Perry Stadium; Bowling Green, OH		L 8–48	15,338
October 6	1:00 pm	Brown*	Meade Stadium; Kingston, RI (Battle for the Governor's Cup)		L 7–17	3,305
October 13	1:00 pm	Georgia State	Meade Stadium; Kingston, RI		L 7–41	6,013
October 20	3:30 pm	at No. 25 Delaware	Delaware Stadium; Newark, DE		L 24–47	18,672
October 27	12:00 pm	No. 12 New Hampshire^{†}	Meade Stadium; Kingston, RI		L 20–40	5,127
November 3	6:00 pm	at No. 22 Richmond	E. Claiborne Robins Stadium; Richmond, VA		L 0–39	8,700
November 10	3:30 pm	at Towson	Johnny Unitas Stadium; Towson, MD		L 10–41	7,362
November 17	12:00 pm	Maine	Meade Stadium; Kingston, RI		L 6–55	2,100
*Non-conference game; ^{†}Homecoming; Rankings from The Sports Network Poll released prior to the game; All times are in Eastern time
