= 2012 Sacred Heart Pioneers football team =

American college football season

2012 Sacred Heart Pioneers football
- Conference: Northeast Conference
- Record: 2–9 (1–7 NEC)
- Head coach: Mark Nofri (1st season)
- Offensive coordinator: Kevin Bolis (2nd season)
- Defensive coordinator: Dave Wissman (2nd season)
- Home stadium: Campus Field

2012 Northeast Conference football standings
| | Conf. | | | Overall |
| Team | W | | L | W | | L |
|---|---|---|---|---|---|---|
| No. 21 Wagner +^ | 7 | – | 1 | 9 | – | 4 |
| Albany + | 7 | – | 1 | 9 | – | 2 |
| Monmouth | 4 | – | 3 | 5 | – | 5 |
| Saint Francis (PA) | 4 | – | 4 | 5 | – | 6 |
| Bryant | 4 | – | 4 | 4 | – | 7 |
| Robert Morris | 3 | – | 5 | 4 | – | 7 |
| Duquesne | 3 | – | 5 | 5 | – | 6 |
| Central Connecticut | 2 | – | 5 | 2 | – | 8 |
| Sacred Heart | 1 | – | 7 | 2 | – | 9 |
+ – Conference co-champions; ^ – FCS playoff participant; Rankings from The Sports Network poll

The 2012 Sacred Heart Pioneers football team represented Sacred Heart University as a member of the Northeast Conference (NEC) during the 2012 NCAA Division I FCS football season. Led by first-year head coach Mark Nofri, the Pioneers compiled an overall record of 2–9 with a mark of 1–7 in conference play, placing last out of nine teams in the NEC. Sacred Heart played home games at Campus Field in Fairfield, Connecticut.

== Schedule ==
| Date | Time | Opponent | Site | TV | Result | Attendance |
|---|---|---|---|---|---|---|
| September 1 | 1:00 p.m. | at Morgan State* | Hughes Stadium; Baltimore, MD | | L 27–30 ^{4OT} | 3,651 |
| September 15 | 1:00 p.m. | at Colgate* | Andy Kerr Stadium; Hamilton, NY | | L 14–35 | 5,438 |
| September 22 | 1:00 p.m. | at Monmouth | Kessler Field; West Long Branch, NJ | | L 14–27 | 2,892 |
| September 29 | 12:00 p.m. | Central Connecticut^{†} | Campus Field; Fairfield, CT | FCS, CoxCT, ESPN3 | W 34–21 | 3,052 |
| October 6 | 1:00 p.m. | Wagner | Campus Field; Fairfield, CT | | L 3–12 | 1,281 |
| October 13 | 1:30 p.m. | at Dartmouth* | Memorial Field; Hanover, NH | | W 27–10 | 3,473 |
| October 20 | 12:00 p.m. | at Duquesne | Arthur J. Rooney Athletic Field; Pittsburgh, PA | | L 3–35 | 2,215 |
| October 27 | 1:00 p.m. | No. 24 Albany | Campus Field; Fairfield, CT | | L 20–23 | 3,505 |
| November 3 | 1:00 p.m. | at Bryant | Bulldog Stadium; Smithfield, RI | | L 14–34 | 1,634 |
| November 10 | 12:00 p.m. | Robert Morris | Campus Field; Fairfield, CT | | L 17–21 | 1,336 |
| November 17 | 12:00 p.m. | at St. Francis (PA) | DeGol Field; Loretto, PA | | L 24–44 | 1,507 |
*Non-conference game; ^{†}Homecoming; Rankings from The Sports Network Poll released prior to the game; All times are in Eastern time
