= 2012 Central Connecticut Blue Devils football team =

American college football season

2012 Central Connecticut Blue Devils football
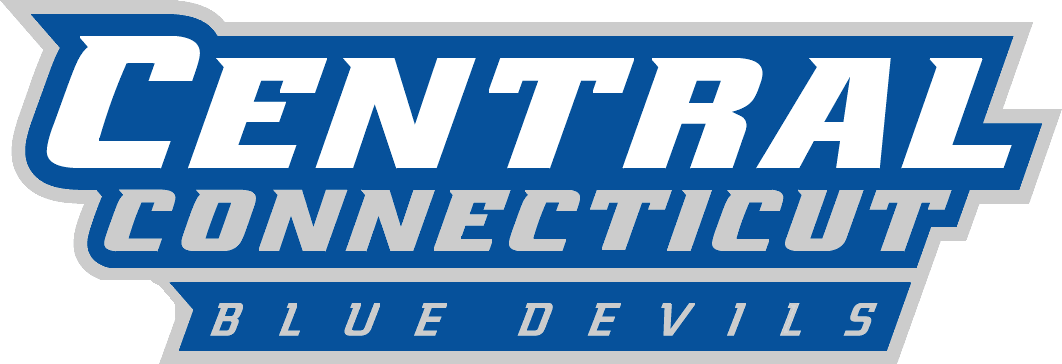
- Conference: Northeast Conference
- Record: 2–8 (2–5 NEC)
- Head coach: Jeff McInerney (7th season)
- Offensive coordinator: Tim Stowers (3rd season)
- Home stadium: Arute Field

2012 Northeast Conference football standings
	Conf.			Overall
Team	W		L	W		L
No. 21 Wagner +^	7	–	1	9	–	4
Albany +	7	–	1	9	–	2
Monmouth	4	–	3	5	–	5
Saint Francis (PA)	4	–	4	5	–	6
Bryant	4	–	4	4	–	7
Robert Morris	3	–	5	4	–	7
Duquesne	3	–	5	5	–	6
Central Connecticut	2	–	5	2	–	8
Sacred Heart	1	–	7	2	–	9
+ – Conference co-champions; ^ – FCS playoff participant; Rankings from The Sports Network poll

The 2012 Central Connecticut Blue Devils football team represented Central Connecticut State University in the 2012 NCAA Division I FCS football season. They were led by seventh year head coach Jeff McInerney and played their home games at Arute Field. They are a member of the Northeast Conference. They finished the season 2–8, 2–5 in NEC play to finish in eighth place.

== Schedule ==
Date	Time	Opponent	Site	TV	Result	Attendance
September 1	6:00 p.m.	at No. 17 Stony Brook*	Kenneth P. LaValle Stadium; Stony Brook, NY		L 17–49	6,094
September 8	12:00 p.m.	No. 16 Lehigh*	Arute Field; New Britain, CT		L 14–35	5,098
September 15	12:00 p.m.	at No. 18 New Hampshire*	Cowell Stadium; Durham, NH		L 10–43	7,784
September 22	7:00 p.m.	Wagner^{†}	Arute Field; New Britain, CT	FCS, MSG	L 13–31	4,515
September 29	12:00 p.m.	at Sacred Heart	Campus Field; Fairfield, CT	FCS, Cox CT, ESPN3	L 21–34	3,052
October 13	12:00 p.m.	Duquesne	Arute Field; New Britain, CT		W 38–31	4,013
October 20	12:00 p.m.	at Robert Morris	Joe Walton Stadium; Moon Township, PA		L 31–37	1,020
October 27	12:00 p.m.	Saint Francis (PA)	Arute Field; New Britain, CT		W 32–30	2,127
November 3	1:00 p.m.	at Monmouth	Kessler Field; West Long Branch, NJ		Cancelled	
November 10	12:00 p.m.	Bryant	Arute Field; New Britain, CT		L 25–28	3,110
November 17	1:00 p.m.	at Albany	University Field; Albany, NY		L 34–63	1,876
*Non-conference game; ^{†}Homecoming; Rankings from The Sports Network Poll released prior to the game; All times are in Eastern time

The game against Monmouth on November 3 was cancelled due to effects from Hurricane Sandy.
