= 2012 Monmouth Hawks football team =

American college football season

2012 Monmouth Hawks football
- Conference: Northeast Conference
- Record: 5–5 (4–3 NEC)
- Head coach: Kevin Callahan (20th season)
- Offensive coordinator: Scott Van Zile (5th season)
- Offensive scheme: Multiple
- Defensive coordinator: Andy Bobik (19th season)
- Base defense: 4–3
- Home stadium: Kessler Field

2012 Northeast Conference football standings
	Conf.			Overall
Team	W		L	W		L
No. 21 Wagner +^	7	–	1	9	–	4
Albany +	7	–	1	9	–	2
Monmouth	4	–	3	5	–	5
Saint Francis (PA)	4	–	4	5	–	6
Bryant	4	–	4	4	–	7
Robert Morris	3	–	5	4	–	7
Duquesne	3	–	5	5	–	6
Central Connecticut	2	–	5	2	–	8
Sacred Heart	1	–	7	2	–	9
+ – Conference co-champions; ^ – FCS playoff participant; Rankings from The Sports Network poll

The 2012 Monmouth Hawks Devils football team represented Monmouth University in the 2012 NCAA Division I FCS football season as a member of the Northeast Conference. They were led by 20th- year head coach Kevin Callahan and played their home games at Kessler Field. They finished the season 5–5 overall and 4–3 in NEC play to place third.

This was the Hawks last season as a member of the NEC. In July 2013, Monmouth athletics moved to the Metro Atlantic Athletic Conference. However, the MAAC does not sponsor football, so the Hawks played the 2013 season as an FCS independent before joining the Big South Conference as a football-only member in 2014.

== Schedule ==
Date	Time	Opponent	Site	TV	Result	Attendance
September 1	12:30 p.m.	at No. 16 Lehigh*	Goodman Stadium; Bethlehem, PA	2 Sports	L 17–27	6,350
September 8	1:00 p.m.	Rhode Island*	Kessler Field; West Long Branch, NJ		W 41–6	2,986
September 15	1:00 p.m.	at Wagner	Wagner College Stadium; Staten Island, NY		W 38–17	2,610
September 22	1:00 p.m.	Sacred Heart	Kessler Field; West Long Branch, NJ		W 27–14	2,892
September 29	1:00 p.m.	at Albany	University Field; Albany, NY		L 24–55	2,482
October 13	12:30 p.m.	at Cornell*	Schoellkopf Field; Ithaca, NY		L 38–41	4,367
October 20	1:00 p.m.	Bryant	Kessler Field; West Long Branch, NJ		L 24–27	4,185
October 27	12:00 p.m.	at Duquesne	Arthur J. Rooney Athletic Field; Pittsburgh, PA		W 28–27	1,897
November 3	1:00 p.m.	Central Connecticut	Kessler Field; West Long Branch, NJ		Cancelled	
November 10	12:00 p.m.	Saint Francis (PA)	Kessler Field; West Long Branch, NJ	FCS/ROOT/ESPN3	L 31–45	1,410
November 17	12:00 p.m.	at Robert Morris	Joe Walton Stadium; Moon Township, PA		W 26–21	1,043
*Non-conference game; Rankings from The Sports Network Poll released prior to the game; All times are in Eastern time

Central Connecticut game on November 3 cancelled due to effect from Hurricane Sandy.
