= 2012 Delaware Fightin' Blue Hens football team =

American college football season

2012 Delaware Fightin' Blue Hens football
- Conference: Colonial Athletic Association
- Record: 5–6 (2–6 CAA)
- Head coach: K. C. Keeler (11th season)
- Offensive coordinator: Jim Hofher (4th season)
- Offensive scheme: Spread
- Defensive coordinator: Nick Rapone (7th season)
- Base defense: 4–3
- Home stadium: Delaware Stadium

2012 Colonial Athletic Association football standings
	Conf.			Overall
Team	W		L	W		L
No. 6 Old Dominion ^	7	–	1	11	–	2
No. 18 Richmond +	6	–	2	8	–	3
No. 13 New Hampshire +^	6	–	2	8	–	4
No. 15 Villanova +^	6	–	2	8	–	4
No. 17 Towson +	6	–	2	7	–	4
No. 19 James Madison	5	–	3	7	–	4
Maine	4	–	4	5	–	6
Delaware	2	–	6	5	–	6
William & Mary	1	–	7	2	–	9
Rhode Island	0	–	8	0	–	11
Georgia State	0	–	0	1	–	10
+ – Conference co-champions; ^ – FCS playoff participant; Georgia State's conference record was 0–0, and it did not occupy a spot in the overall standings. Old Dominion was ineligible for the conference championship because of its announced departure for Conference USA in 2013.; Rankings from The Sports Network poll

The 2012 Delaware Fightin' Blue Hens football team represented the University of Delaware as a member of the Colonial Athletic Association (CAA) during the 2012 NCAA Division I FCS football season. Led by K. C. Keeler in his 11th and final season as head coach, the Fightin' Blue Hens compiled an overall record of 5–6 with a mark of 2–6 in conference play, placing eighth in the CAA. The team played home games at Delaware Stadium in Newark, Delaware.

Keeler was fired after the season.

== Schedule ==
Date	Time	Opponent	Rank	Site	TV	Result	Attendance
August 30	7:30 pm	West Chester*	No. 15	Delaware Stadium; Newark, DE (rivalry)		W 41–21	18,823
September 8	3:30 pm	Delaware State*	No. 15	Delaware Stadium; Newark, DE (Route 1 Rivalry)	NBCSN	W 38–14	16,898
September 15	3:30 pm	Bucknell*	No. 13	Delaware Stadium; Newark, DE		W 19–3	18,118
September 22	7:00 pm	at William & Mary	No. 12	Zable Stadium; Williamsburg, VA (rivalry)	CSN	W 51–21	10,601
September 29	12:00 pm	at No. 20 New Hampshire	No. 8	Cowell Stadium; Durham, NH		L 14–34	7,058
October 6	3:30 pm	Maine	No. 16	Delaware Stadium; Newark, DE	CSN	L 3–26	21,506
October 20	3:30 pm	Rhode Island^{†}	No. 25	Delaware Stadium; Newark, DE		W 47–24	18,672
October 27	12:00 pm	at No. 6 Old Dominion	No. 20	Foreman Field; Norfolk, VA (Oyster Bowl)	NBCSN	L 26–31	20,068
November 3	12:00 pm	No. 19 Towson	No. 23	Delaware Stadium; Newark, DE	NBCSN	L 27–34 ^{OT}	16,252
November 10	3:30 pm	at No. 20 Richmond		E. Claiborne Robins Stadium; Richmond, VA		L 17–23	8,700
November 17	3:30 pm	No. 16 Villanova		Delaware Stadium; Newark, DE (Battle of the Blue)	CSN	L 10–41	19,523
*Non-conference game; ^{†}Homecoming; Rankings from The Sports Network Poll released prior to the game; All times are in Eastern time

== Personnel ==
=== Coaching staff ===
Delaware head coach K. C. Keeler was in his 11th year as the Blue Hens' head coach. During his previous ten years with Delaware, he led the Fightin' Blue Hens to an overall record of 81–46 and an NCAA Division I-AA Football Championship in 2003.

Delaware promoted Andy Marino from his role as a graduate assistant to tight ends and offensive tackles coach on July 26, 2012. Marino took the place of David Boler, who left to become the wide receivers coach for Rhode Island. Kirk Ciarrocca was rehired as running backs coach after being an assistant coach for Rutgers and Richmond for four seasons. He was the offensive coordinator and quarterbacks coach for Delaware from 2002 to 2007.

Name	Position	Seasons at Delaware	Alma mater
K. C. Keeler	Head coach	11	Delaware (1980)
Brad Sherrod	Assistant head coach, Linebackers	3	Duke (1994)
Jim Hofher	Offensive coordinator, Quarterbacks	4	Cornell (1979)
Nick Rapone	Defensive coordinator, Safeties	7	Virginia Tech (1979)
Brian Ginn	Passing game coordinator, Receivers	13	Delaware (2000)
Gregg Perry	Run game coordinator, Recruiting coordinator, Offensive line	30	Delaware (1977)
Kirk Ciarrocca	Running backs	7	Temple (1990)
Phil Petitte	Defensive line	7	Glassboro State (1971)
Henry Baker	Cornerbacks, Special teams	2	Maryland (2003)
Andy Marino	Tight ends, Offensive tackles	3	Lycoming (1982)
John Smith	Head athletic trainer	12	Penn State (1988)

=== Transfers ===
Redshirt sophomore quarterback Trent Hurley transferred from Bowling Green and redshirt freshman guard Sam Collura transferred to Delaware from Pittsburgh. Three former Maryland players transferred to Delaware: junior defensive tackle Zach Kerr, junior linebacker David Mackall, and redshirt sophomore defensive back Mario Rowson. Redshirt sophomore defensive end Andrew Opoku from Connecticut transferred to Delaware. Redshirt junior tight end Malcolm Bush transferred from Rutgers in August.

=== Opening depth chart ===
Defense

FS
Ricky Tunstall
Craig Brodsky

WLB	MLB	SLB
⋅	Paul Worrilow	⋅
Kyle Gayle	Patrick Callaway	⋅

SS
Tim Breaker
Jake Giusti

CB
Travis Hawkins
Mario Rowson

DE	DT	DT	DE
Ethan Clark	Zach Kerr	Irv Titre	Laith Wallschleger
Andrew Opoku	Karon Gibson	Logan Shultz	Derrick Saulsberry

CB
Marcus Burley
Derek Coleman

Offense

WR
Rob Jones
Stephen Clark

WR
Michael Johnson
Mike Milburn

LT	LG	C	RG	RT
Erle Ladson	J. D. Dzurko	Brandon Heath	Nick Cattolico	Ben Curtis
Matt Becker	Will Lewis	Jake Geiser	Christian Marchena	Connor Bozick

TE
Nick Boyle
Ryan Cobb

WR
Nihja White
Jerel Harrison

QB
Trent Hurley
Tim Donnelly

RB
Andrew Pierce
David Hayes

Special teams
PK Sean Baner
PK Garrett Greenway
P Rauley Zaragoza
P Sean Baner
KR Travis Hawkins
PR Rob Jones
LS Eddie Herr
H Tim Donnelly

== Game summaries ==
=== West Chester ===
Team	1	2	3	4	Total
West Chester	0	7	7	7	21
• #15 Delaware	14	10	0	17	41

- Location: Newark, Delaware
- Game start: 7:36 p.m.
- Elapsed time: 2:57
- Game attendance: 18,823
- Game weather: Clear, warm
- Referee: Henry Winberg

Scoring summary
1	9:06	Delaware	Michael Johnson 19-yard pass from Trent Hurley (Sean Baner kick)	Delaware 7–0
1	4:47	Delaware	Michael Johnson 19-yard run (Sean Baner kick)	Delaware 14–0
2	13:05	West Chester	Sean McCartney four-yard run (Shawn Leo kick)	Delaware 14–7
2	5:42	Delaware	Sean Baner 37-yard field goal	Delaware 17–7
2	0:43	Delaware	Rob Jones nine-yard pass from Trent Hurley (Sean Baner kick)	Delaware 24–7
3	10:43	West Chester	LaRonn Lee 10-yard pass from Sean McCartney (Shawn Leo kick)	Delaware 24–14
4	12:34	Delaware	Sean Baner 22-yard field goal	Delaware 27–14
4	11:35	Delaware	Rob Jones 63-yard pass from Trent Hurley (Sean Baner kick)	Delaware 34–14
4	5:25	West Chester	Rondell White 26-yard pass from Mike Mattei (Shawn Leo kick)	Delaware 34–21
4	1:39	Delaware	David Hayes three-yard run (Sean Baner kick)	Delaware 41–21

=== Delaware State ===
Team	1	2	3	4	Total
Delaware State	0	7	7	0	14
• #15 Delaware	7	21	3	7	38

- Location: Newark, Delaware
- Game start: 3:37 p.m.
- Elapsed time: 4:03
- Game attendance: 16,898
- Game weather: Thunderstorms (50 minute delay at halftime)
- Referee: Henry Winberg
- TV announcers (NBC Sports Network): Todd Harris (play-by-play), Ross Tucker (color), Carolyn Manno (sideline)

Scoring summary
1	3:39	Delaware	Ricky Tunstall 91-yard interception return (Sean Baner kick)	Delaware 7–0
2	12:17	Delaware	Michael Johnson 14-yard pass from Trent Hurley (Sean Baner kick)	Delaware 14–0
2	7:51	Delaware	Trent Hurley one-yard run (Sean Baner kick)	Delaware 21–0
2	3:02	Delaware State	Justin Wilson 18-yard pass from Nick Elko (Mitchell Ward kick)	Delaware 21–7
2	0:17	Delaware	Jerel Harrison six-yard pass from Tim Donnelly (Sean Baner kick)	Delaware 28–7
3	11:48	Delaware	Sean Baner 20-yard field goal	Delaware 31–7
3	5:04	Delaware State	Nagee Jackson one-yard run (Mitchell Ward kick)	Delaware 31−14
4	3:00	Delaware	Jerel Harrison 18-yard pass from Trent Hurley (Sean Baner kick)	Delaware 38–14

=== Bucknell ===
Team	1	2	3	4	Total
Bucknell	0	3	0	0	3
• #13 Delaware	3	3	10	3	19

- Location: Newark, Delaware
- Game start: 3:36 p.m.
- Elapsed time: 2:31
- Game attendance: 18,118
- Game weather: Sunny
- Referee: Charles Lamertina

Scoring summary
1	6:38	Delaware	Sean Baner 41-yard field goal	Delaware 3–0
2	14:56	Bucknell	Sean Cobelli 21-yard field goal	Tied 3–3
2	8:11	Delaware	Sean Baner 20-yard field goal	Delaware 6–3
3	11:31	Delaware	Sean Baner 32-yard field goal	Delaware 9–3
3	4:20	Delaware	Trent Hurley 11-yard run (Sean Baner kick)	Delaware 16–3
4	12:36	Delaware	Sean Baner 21-yard field goal	Delaware 19–3

=== William & Mary ===
Team	1	2	3	4	Total
• #12 Delaware	10	17	21	3	51
William & Mary	0	7	7	7	21

- Location: Williamsburg, Virginia
- Game start: 7:00 p.m.
- Elapsed time: 4:24
- Game attendance: 10,601
- Game weather: Rain (80 minute delay for lightning)
- Referee: J. Winter
- TV announcers (CSNMA/CSNNE/TCN): Joe Beninati (play-by-play), Qadry Ismail (color), Brian Jackson (sideline)

Scoring summary
1	6:37	Delaware	Sean Baner 20-yard field goal	Delaware 3–0
1	4:00	Delaware	Zach Kerr 47-yard interception return (Sean Baner kick)	Delaware 10–0
2	11:17	Delaware	Trent Hurley one-yard run (Sean Baner kick)	Delaware 17–0
2	8:10	Delaware	Travis Hawkins 90-yard blocked field goal return (Sean Baner kick)	Delaware 24–0
2	3:26	William & Mary	Raphael Ortiz two-yard run (Drake Kuhn kick)	Delaware 24–7
2	0:39	Delaware	Sean Baner 48-yard field goal	Delaware 27–7
3	13:12	Delaware	Andrew Pierce 23-yard run (Sean Baner kick)	Delaware 34–7
3	3:25	Delaware	Andrew Pierce four-yard run (Sean Baner kick)	Delaware 41–7
3	2:04	Delaware	Vince Hollerman 45-yard fumble recovery (Sean Baner kick)	Delaware 48–7
3	1:07	William & Mary	Darnell Laws eight-yard run (Drake Kuhn kick)	Delaware 48–14
4	10:17	Delaware	Sean Baner 20-yard field goal	Delaware 51–14
4	6:15	William & Mary	B.W. Webb 91-yard punt return (Drake Kuhn kick)	Delaware 51–21

=== New Hampshire ===
Team	1	2	3	4	Total
#8 Delaware	7	0	0	7	14
• #20 New Hampshire	0	0	14	20	34

- Location: Durham, New Hampshire
- Game start: 12:00 p.m.
- Elapsed time: 2:38
- Game attendance: 7,058
- Game weather: Overcast, damp
- Referee: Bill Gosselin

Scoring summary
1	1:05	Delaware	Trent Hurley one-yard run (Sean Baner kick)	Delaware 7–0
3	11:02	New Hampshire	R. J. Harris 32-yard pass from Andy Vailas (Mike MacArthur kick)	Tied 7–7
3	5:08	New Hampshire	Andy Vailas one-yard run (Mike MacArthur kick)	New Hampshire 14–7
4	14:50	New Hampshire	R. J. Harris seven-yard pass from Andy Vailas (Mike MacArthur kick)	New Hampshire 21–7
4	8:16	New Hampshire	Mike MacArthur 23-yard field goal	New Hampshire 24–7
4	4:54	New Hampshire	Mike MacArthur 28-yard field goal	New Hampshire 27–7
4	3:52	New Hampshire	Jimmy Owens 60-yard run (Mike MacArthur kick)	New Hampshire 34–7
4	0:34	Delaware	Mike Milburn 26-yard pass from Trent Hurley (Sean Baner kick)	New Hampshire 34–14

=== Maine ===
Team	1	2	3	4	Total
• Maine	7	9	7	3	26
#16 Delaware	3	0	0	0	3

- Location: Newark, Delaware
- Game start: 3:37 p.m.
- Elapsed time: 2:46
- Game attendance: 21,506
- Game weather: Sunny
- Referee: Jeff Gray
- TV announcers (CSNMA/CSNNE/TCN): Scott Graham (play-by-play), Antonio Freeman (color), Rob Carlin (sideline)

Scoring summary
1	10:47	Maine	Damarr Aultman 22-yard pass from Mar Wasilewski (Sean Decloux kick)	Maine 7–0
1	6:08	Delaware	Sean Baner 27-yard field goal	Maine 7–3
2	6:39	Maine	Safety	Maine 9–3
2	5:50	Maine	Damarr Aultman 50-yard pass from Mar Wasilewski (Sean Decloux kick)	Maine 16–3
3	10:14	Maine	Mauri McDonald 16-yard pass from Mar Wasilewski (Sean Decloux kick)	Maine 23–3
4	6:32	Maine	Sean Decloux 34-yard field goal	Maine 26−3

=== Rhode Island ===
Team	1	2	3	4	Total
Rhode Island	7	0	3	14	24
• #25 Delaware	12	14	7	14	47

- Location: Newark, Delaware
- Game start: 3:36 p.m.
- Elapsed time: 2:54
- Game attendance: 18,672
- Game weather: Sunny
- Referee: Bill Broadhurst

Scoring summary
1	12:25	Rhode Island	Robbie Jackson 6-yard pass from Bob Bentsen (Dylan Smith kick)	Rhode Island 7–0
1	4:43	Delaware	Sean Baner 27-yard field goal	Rhode Island 7–3
1	0:49	Delaware	Tim Donnelly 5-yard run (Sean Baner kick)	Delaware 10–7
1	0:39	Delaware	Safety	Delaware 12–7
2	10:51	Delaware	Andrew Pierce 6-yard run (Sean Baner kick)	Delaware 19–7
2	0:39	Delaware	Andrew Pierce 5-yard pass from Tim Donnelly (Sean Baner kick)	Delaware 26–7
3	10:33	Delaware	Trevor Sasek 2-yard run (Sean Baner kick)	Delaware 33–7
3	5:17	Rhode Island	Dylan Smith 38-yard field goal	Delaware 33–10
4	14:30	Rhode Island	Brandon Johnson-Farrell 7-yard pass from Bob Bentsen (Dylan Smith kick)	Delaware 33–17
4	9:54	Delaware	Andrew Pierce 14-yard run (Sean Baner kick)	Delaware 40–17
4	3:57	Delaware	Julian Laing 13-yard run (Sean Baner kick)	Delaware 47–17
4	0:37	Rhode Island	Brandon Johnson-Farrell 11-yard pass from Danny Fenyak (Dylan Smith kick)	Delaware 47–24

=== Old Dominion ===
Team	1	2	3	4	Total
#20 Delaware	7	10	3	6	26
• #6 Old Dominion	7	14	7	3	31

- Location: Norfolk, Virginia
- Game start: 12:09 p.m.
- Elapsed time: 3:15
- Game attendance: 20,068
- Game weather: Cloudy
- Referee: Tony Marcella
- TV announcers (NBCSN): Todd Harris (play-by-play), Anthony Herron (color), Carolyn Manno (sideline)

Scoring summary
1	7:06	Delaware	Michael Johnson 9-yard pass from Tim Donnelly (Sean Baner kick)	Delaware 7–0
1	3:34	Old Dominion	Taylor Heinicke 22-yard run (Jarod Brown kick)	Tied 7–7
2	14:15	Delaware	Mike Milburn 16-yard pass from Trent Hurley (Sean Baner kick)	Delaware 14–7
2	9:08	Old Dominion	Taylor Heinicke 1-yard run (Jarod Brown kick)	Tied 14–14
2	3:39	Delaware	Sean Baner 27-yard field goal	Delaware 17–14
2	0:14	Old Dominion	Taylor Heinicke 1-yard run (Jarod Brown kick)	Old Dominion 21–17
3	6:50	Old Dominion	Tyree Lee 9-yard run (Jarod Brown kick)	Old Dominion 28–17
3	3:22	Delaware	Sean Baner 28-yard field goal	Old Dominion 28–20
4	12:21	Delaware	Nihja White 13-yard pass from Trent Hurley (Trent Hurley rush failed)	Old Dominion 28–26
4	1:17	Old Dominion	Jarod Brown 29-yard field goal	Old Dominion 31−26

=== Towson ===
Team	1	2	3	4	OT	Total
• #19 Towson	7	7	6	7	7	34
#23 Delaware	0	10	7	10	0	27

- Location: Newark, Delaware
- Game start: 12:06 p.m.
- Elapsed time: 3:31
- Game attendance: 16,252
- Game weather: Overcast, cold
- Referee: Paul Zukis
- TV announcers (NBCSN): Ari Wolfe (play-by-play), Anthony Herron (color), Carolyn Manno (sideline)

Scoring summary
1	2:31	Towson	Dominique Booker 2-yard run (D. J. Soven kick)	Towson 7–0
2	7:15	Delaware	Jerel Harrison 19-yard pass from Trent Hurley (Sean Baner kick)	Tied 7–7
2	0:57	Towson	Emmanuel Holder 25-yard pass from Grant Enders (D. J. Soven kick)	Towson 14–7
2	0:06	Delaware	Sean Baner 47-yard field goal	Towson 14–10
3	6:18	Towson	Terrance West 1-yard run (D. J. Soven kick failed)	Towson 20–10
3	3:24	Delaware	Michael Johnson 25-yard pass from Trent Hurley (Sean Baner kick)	Towson 20–17
4	14:21	Delaware	Julian Laing 4-yard run (Sean Baner kick)	Delaware 24–20
4	0:44	Towson	Emmanuel Holder 2-yard pass from Grant Enders (D. J. Soven kick)	Towson 27–24
4	0:02	Delaware	Sean Baner 40-yard field goal	Tied 27–27
OT	15:00	Towson	Terrance West 3-yard run (D. J. Soven kick)	Towson 34−27

=== Richmond ===
Team	1	2	3	4	Total
Delaware	0	7	0	10	17
• #20 Richmond	10	7	3	3	23

- Location: Richmond, Virginia
- Game start: 3:36 p.m.
- Elapsed time: 3:00
- Game attendance: 8,700
- Game weather: Clear, sunny
- Referee: Jack Winter

Scoring summary
1	10:02	Richmond	Kendall Gaskins 8-yard run (Remington Hinshaw kick)	Richmond 7–0
1	4:15	Richmond	Remington Hinshaw 25-yard field goal	Richmond 10–0
2	12:06	Richmond	Kendall Gaskins 6-yard run (Remington Hinshaw kick)	Richmond 17–0
2	8:52	Delaware	Julian Laing 2-yard run (Sean Baner kick)	Richmond 17–7
3	2:28	Richmond	Remington Hinshaw 37-yard field goal	Richmond 20–7
4	11:30	Delaware	Ricky Tunstall 77-yard interception return (Sean Baner kick)	Richmond 20–14
4	6:09	Richmond	Remington Hinshaw 23-yard field goal	Richmond 23–14
4	3:05	Delaware	Sean Baner 42-yard field goal	Richmond 23–17

=== Villanova ===
Team	1	2	3	4	Total
• #16 Villanova	7	7	3	24	41
Delaware	7	3	0	0	10

- Location: Newark, Delaware
- Game start: 3:37 p.m.
- Elapsed time: 3:02
- Game attendance: 19,523
- Game weather: Clear, cool
- Referee: Henry Wimberg
- TV announcers (TCN): Scott Graham (play-by-play), Kevin Reilly (color)

Scoring summary
1	11:34	Villanova	Norman White 13-yard pass from John Robertson (Mark Hamilton kick)	Villanova 7–0
1	11:22	Delaware	Michael Johnson 94-yard kickoff return (Sean Baner kick)	Tied 7–7
2	6:32	Villanova	Kevin Monangai 7-yard run (Mark Hamilton kick)	Villanova 14–7
2	4:17	Delaware	Sean Baner 30-yard field goal	Villanova 14–10
3	6:26	Villanova	Mark Hamilton 28-yard field goal	Villanova 17–10
4	13:30	Villanova	Mark Hamilton 37-yard field goal	Villanova 20–10
4	5:13	Villanova	John Robertson 11-yard run (Mark Hamilton kick)	Villanova 27–10
4	3:47	Villanova	Ronnie Akins 45-yard interception return (Mark Hamilton kick)	Villanova 34–10
4	1:14	Villanova	Eric Loper 42-yard interception return (Mark Hamilton kick)	Villanova 41−10

== Ranking movements ==
Ranking movements Legend: ██ Increase in ranking ██ Decrease in ranking — = Not ranked RV = Received votes
	Week															
Poll	Pre	1	2	3	4	5	6	7	8	9	10	11	12	13	14	Final
Sports Network	15	15	13	12	8	16	24	25	20	23	RV	RV	RV	—	—	—
Coaches	14	15	14	12	8	15	22	22	16	20	RV	RV	—	—	—	—
