= 2012 Robert Morris Colonials football team =

American college football season

2012 Robert Morris Colonials football
- Conference: Northeast Conference
- Record: 4–7 (3–5 NEC)
- Head coach: Joe Walton (19th season)
- Defensive coordinator: Scott Farison (5th season)
- Co-defensive coordinator: Scott Benzel (4th season)
- Home stadium: Joe Walton Stadium

2012 Northeast Conference football standings
	Conf.			Overall
Team	W		L	W		L
No. 21 Wagner +^	7	–	1	9	–	4
Albany +	7	–	1	9	–	2
Monmouth	4	–	3	5	–	5
Saint Francis (PA)	4	–	4	5	–	6
Bryant	4	–	4	4	–	7
Robert Morris	3	–	5	4	–	7
Duquesne	3	–	5	5	–	6
Central Connecticut	2	–	5	2	–	8
Sacred Heart	1	–	7	2	–	9
+ – Conference co-champions; ^ – FCS playoff participant; Rankings from The Sports Network poll

The 2012 Robert Morris Colonials football team represented Robert Morris University in the 2012 NCAA Division I FCS football season. They were led by 19th-year head coach Joe Walton and played their home games at Joe Walton Stadium. They are a member of the Northeast Conference. They finished the season 4–7, 3–5 in NEC play to finish in a tie for sixth place.

== Schedule ==
Date	Time	Opponent	Site	TV	Result	Attendance	Source
September 1	7:00 p.m.	at No. 2 North Dakota State*	Fargodome; Fargo, ND		L 0–52	18,769	
September 8	12:00 p.m.	Albany	Joe Walton Stadium; Moon Township, PA		L 10–35	1,068	
September 15	1:00 p.m.	at Dayton*	Welcome Stadium; Dayton, OH		L 14–20	3,116	
September 29	6:00 p.m.	Lafayette*	Joe Walton Stadium; Moon Township, PA		W 31–28	3,524	
October 6	12:00 p.m.	at Saint Francis (PA)	DeGol Field; Loretto, PA		L 3–10	1,726	
October 13	1:00 p.m.	at Bryant	Bulldog Stadium; Smithfield, RI		L 35–38	3,682	
October 20	12:00 p.m.	Central Connecticut	Joe Walton Stadium; Moon Township, PA		W 37–31	1,020	
October 27	1:00 p.m.	at Wagner	Wagner College Stadium; Staten Island, NY		L 13–23	2,072	
November 3	3:30 p.m.	Duquesne	Joe Walton Stadium; Moon Township, PA	FCS/ROOT/ESPN3	W 17–13	2,028	
November 10	12:00 p.m.	at Sacred Heart	Campus Field; Fairfield, CT		W 21–17	1,336	
November 17	12:00 p.m.	Monmouth	Joe Walton Stadium; Moon Township, PA		L 21–26	1,043	
*Non-conference game; Rankings from The Sports Network Poll released prior to the game; All times are in Eastern time
