= 2012 Duquesne Dukes football team =

American college football season

2012 Duquesne Dukes football
- Conference: Northeast Conference
- Record: 5–6 (3–5 NEC)
- Head coach: Jerry Schmitt (8th season)
- Offensive coordinator: Gary Dunn (4th season)
- Defensive coordinator: Dave Opfar (3rd season)
- Home stadium: Arthur J. Rooney Field

2012 Northeast Conference football standings
	Conf.			Overall
Team	W		L	W		L
No. 21 Wagner +^	7	–	1	9	–	4
Albany +	7	–	1	9	–	2
Monmouth	4	–	3	5	–	5
Saint Francis (PA)	4	–	4	5	–	6
Bryant	4	–	4	4	–	7
Robert Morris	3	–	5	4	–	7
Duquesne	3	–	5	5	–	6
Central Connecticut	2	–	5	2	–	8
Sacred Heart	1	–	7	2	–	9
+ – Conference co-champions; ^ – FCS playoff participant; Rankings from The Sports Network poll

The 2012 Duquesne Dukes football team represented Duquesne University as a member of the Northeast Conference during the 2012 NCAA Division I FCS football season. Led by eighth -year head coach Jerry Schmitt, the Dukes compiled and overall record of 5–6 with a mark of 3–5 in conference play, tying for sixth place in the NEC. Duquesne play their home games at Arthur J. Rooney Athletic Field in Pittsburgh.

== Schedule ==
Date	Time	Opponent	Site	TV	Result	Attendance
September 1	6:00 pm	at No. 8 Old Dominion*	Foreman Field; Norfolk, VA		L 23–57	19,818
September 8	12:00 pm	Dayton*	Arthur J. Rooney Athletic Field; Pittsburgh, PA		W 17–7	1,902
September 15	1:00 pm	at Valparaiso*	Brown Field; Valparaiso, IN		W 45–17	2,177
September 22	1:00 pm	at Bryant	Bulldog Stadium; Smithfield, RI		W 35–21	2,958
September 29	1:00 pm	Saint Francis (PA)	Arthur J. Rooney Athletic Field; Pittsburgh, PA		W 24–21	2,641
October 13	12:00 pm	at Central Connecticut	Arute Field; New Britain, CT		L 31–38	4,013
October 20	12:00 pm	Sacred Heart	Arthur J. Rooney Athletic Field; Pittsburgh, PA		W 35–3	2,215
October 27	12:00 pm	Monmouth	Arthur J. Rooney Athletic Field; Pittsburgh, PA		L 27–28	1,897
November 3	3:30 pm	at Robert Morris	Joe Walton Stadium; Moon Township, PA	FCS, ROOT, ESPN3	L 13–17	2,028
November 10	12:00 pm	Albany	Arthur J. Rooney Athletic Field; Pittsburgh, PA		L 31–38	2,193
November 17	12:00 pm	at Wagner	Wagner College Stadium; Staten Island, NY		L 17–23	2,692
*Non-conference game; Rankings from The Sports Network Poll released prior to the game; All times are in Eastern time
