= Nick Rapone =

American football coach (born 1956)

Personal information
- Born: April 25, 1956 (age 70); New Castle, Pennsylvania, U.S.

Career information
- College: Virginia Tech

Career history
- Pittsburgh (1979–1980) Graduate assistant; East Tennessee State(1981–1982) Defensive backs coach; Temple (1984–1988) Secondary coach; Temple (1985–1988) Defensive coordinator & secondary coach; Pittsburgh (1989–1992) Defensive coordinator & defensive backs coach; New Castle (PA) High School (1993–1994) Head coach; UConn (1995–1998) Defensive coordinator; Temple (1999–2005) Secondary coach; Delaware (2006–2012) Defensive coordinator & defensive backs coach; Arizona Cardinals (2013–2017) Defensive backs coach; Delaware (2018) Cornerbacks coach; Tampa Bay Buccaneers (2019–2025) Safeties coach

Awards and highlights
- Super Bowl champion (LV)

Nick Rapone (born April 25, 1956) is an American retired football coach who was most recently the safeties coach for the Tampa Bay Buccaneers of the National Football League (NFL). He announced his retirement after the 2025 season. He previously coached at the collegiate level at Temple, Pitt, Delaware, and Connecticut, in addition to several years coaching for the Arizona Cardinals.

== Coaching career ==
Rapone began his career in coaching in 1979 as a graduate assistant at the University of Pittsburgh where he stayed for two years, before going on to East Tennessee State. Rapone began coaching under Bruce Arians at Temple University who he had previously played with and for at Virginia Tech. Originally hired as a secondary coach, Rapone took on the additional responsibility of defensive coordinator for his final four years with the Owls. Following his time at Temple, Rapone returned to Pitt, coaching there for four years. He then spent two seasons at New Castle (Pa.) High School serving as the head coach. This led to his four-year tenure at the University of Connecticut. Rapone returned to Temple for a second stint in 1999, working as the school's secondary coach until the 2006 season. Rapone was at Delaware from 2006 until 2012 as the team's defensive coordinator and defensive backs coach. In 2013 Rapone made the jump to the NFL and was named defensive backs coach for the Arizona Cardinals also under Bruce Arians. He stayed with Arizona until Arians retirement following the 2017 season. Rapone returned to a familiar place in Delaware in 2018 as he was named the team's cornerbacks coach.

In 2019 when Arians came out of retirement to coach the Tampa Bay Buccaneers, Rapone went with him and was named the team's safeties coach. He was part of the coaching staff when the Buccaneers won Super Bowl LV. Rapone remained with the team in 2022 when Todd Bowles who he coached at Temple took over as the team's head coach. On January 8, 2026, Rapone announced his retirement.
