= 2012 Maine Black Bears football team =

American college football season

2012 Maine Black Bears football
- Conference: Colonial Athletic Association
- Record: 5–6 (4–4 CAA)
- Head coach: Jack Cosgrove (20th season)
- Offensive coordinator: Kevin Bourgoin
- Defensive coordinator: Paul Ferraro
- Home stadium: Alfond Stadium

2012 Colonial Athletic Association football standings
	Conf.			Overall
Team	W		L	W		L
No. 6 Old Dominion ^	7	–	1	11	–	2
No. 18 Richmond +	6	–	2	8	–	3
No. 13 New Hampshire +^	6	–	2	8	–	4
No. 15 Villanova +^	6	–	2	8	–	4
No. 17 Towson +	6	–	2	7	–	4
No. 19 James Madison	5	–	3	7	–	4
Maine	4	–	4	5	–	6
Delaware	2	–	6	5	–	6
William & Mary	1	–	7	2	–	9
Rhode Island	0	–	8	0	–	11
Georgia State	0	–	0	1	–	10
+ – Conference co-champions; ^ – FCS playoff participant; Georgia State's conference record was 0–0, and it did not occupy a spot in the overall standings. Old Dominion was ineligible for the conference championship because of its announced departure for Conference USA in 2013.; Rankings from The Sports Network poll

The 2012 Maine Black Bears football team represented the University of Maine in the 2012 NCAA Division I FCS football season. They were led by 20th-year head coach Jack Cosgrove and played their home games at Alfond Stadium. They are a member of the Colonial Athletic Association. They finished the season 5–6, 4–4 in CAA play to finish in seventh place.

== Schedule ==
Date	Time	Opponent	Rank	Site	TV	Result	Attendance
September 8	1:00 PM	at Boston College*	No. 20	Alumni Stadium; Chestnut Hill, MA	ESPN3	L 3–34	30,685
September 15	1:00 PM	at Bryant*	No. 25	Bulldog Stadium; Smithfield, RI		W 51–7	2,418
September 22	6:00 PM	Albany*	No. 23	Alfond Stadium; Orono, ME	WABI	L 20–30	7,101
September 29	3:30 PM	Villanova		Alfond Stadium; Orono, ME	WABI	L 14–35	3,472
October 6	3:30 PM	at No. 16 Delaware		Delaware Stadium; Newark, DE	CSN	W 26–3	21,506
October 13	7:00 PM	at No. 17 Towson		Johnny Unitas Stadium; Towson, MD		L 19–24	10,141
October 20	12:00 PM	No. 12 New Hampshire^{†}		Alfond Stadium; Orono, ME (Battle for the Brice–Cowell Musket)	CSN	L 21–28	4,873
October 27	3:30 PM	at William & Mary		Zable Stadium; Williamsburg, VA		W 24–10	10,398
November 3	3:30 PM	No. 10 James Madison		Alfond Stadium; Orono, ME	CSN	L 7–31	2,951
November 10	2:00 PM	Georgia State		Alfond Stadium; Orono, ME	WABI	W 51–7	2,979
November 17	12:00 PM	at Rhode Island		Meade Stadium; Kingston, RI		W 55–6	2,100
*Non-conference game; ^{†}Homecoming; Rankings from The Sports Network Poll released prior to the game; All times are in Eastern time

== Ranking movements ==
Ranking movements Legend: ██ Increase in ranking ██ Decrease in ranking — = Not ranked RV = Received votes
	Week																
Poll	Pre	1	2	3	4	5	6	7	8	9	10	11	12	13	14	15	Final
Sports Network	21	20	25	23	RV	—											
Coaches	16	18	21	22	RV	RV											
