= List of Delaware Fightin' Blue Hens head football coaches =

The Delaware Fightin' Blue Hens college football team represents the University of Delaware in the Colonial Athletic Association (CAA). The Fightin' Blue Hens compete as part of the National Collegiate Athletic Association (NCAA) Division I Football Championship Subdivision. The program has had 23 head coaches (and one interim head coach) since it began play during the 1889 season, with Ryan Carty hired as the 24th head coach.

The team has played more than 1,159 games over 123 seasons. Harold "Tubby" Raymond is the leader in seasons coached and games won, with 300 victories during his 36 years with the program. William D. Murray has the highest winning percentage, with .747. Ira L. Pierce has the lowest winning percentage, as his team lost all six of their games in 1896.

Of the 23 different head coaches who have led the Blue Hens, Murray, David M. Nelson, and Raymond have been inducted as head coaches into the College Football Hall of Fame.

== Key ==
Key to symbols in coaches list
General		Overall		Conference		Postseason (Note: Although the first Rose Bowl Game was played in 1902, it has been continuously played since the 1916 game, and is recognized as the oldest bowl game by the NCAA. "—" indicates any season prior to 1916 when postseason games were not played.)	
No.	Order of coaches (Note: A running total of the number of head coaches, with coaches who served separate tenures being counted only once. Interim head coaches are represented with "Int" and are not counted in the running total. "—" indicates the team played but either without a coach or no coach is on record. "X" indicates an interim year without play.)	GC	Games coached	CW	Conference wins	PW	Postseason wins
DC	Division championships	OW	Overall wins	CL	Conference losses	PL	Postseason losses
CC	Conference championships	OL	Overall losses	CT	Conference ties	PT	Postseason ties
NC	National championships	OT	Overall ties (Note: Overtime rules in college football were introduced in 1996, making ties impossible in the period since.)	C%	Conference winning percentage		
†	Elected to the College Football Hall of Fame	O%	Overall winning percentage (Note: When computing the win–loss percentage, a tie counts as half a win and half a loss.)				

== Coaches ==
List of head football coaches showing season(s) coached, overall records, conference records, postseason records, championships and selected awards (Note: Statistics correct as of end of 2025 season)
No.	Name	Year(s)	Season(s)	GC	OW	OL	OT	O%	CW	CL	C%	PW	PL	DC	CC	NC	Awards
—	No Coach	1889–1895	7	31	14	13	4	0.516	—	—	—	—	—	—	—	0	—
1	Ira Pierce	1896	1	6	0	6	0	.000	—	—	—	—	—	—	—	0	—
2	Herbert Rice	1897–1901	5	41	16	20	4	0.450	—	—	—	—	—	—	—	0	—
3	Clarence A. Short	1902, 1906	1, 1	16	8	6	2	0.563	—	—	—	—	—	—	—	0	—
4	Nathan Mannakee	1903–1905	3	23	8	13	2	0.392	—	—	—	—	—	—	—	0	—
5	E. Pratt King	1907	1	6	0	5	1	0.084	—	—	—	—	—	—	—	0	—
6	William McAvoy	1908–1916, 1922–1924	9, 3	98	42	43	13	0.494	—	—	—	0	0	—	—	0	—
7	Stan Baumgartner	1917	1	7	2	5	0	0.286	—	—	—	0	0	—	—	0	—
8	Milton Aronowitz	1918	1	5	1	2	2	0.400	—	—	—	0	0	—	—	0	—
9	Burton Shipley	1919–1920	2	17	5	10	2	0.353	—	—	—	0	0	—	—	0	—
10	Sylvester Derby	1921	1	9	5	4	0	0.556	—	—	—	0	0	—	—	0	—
11	R. M. Forstburg	1925–1926	2	16	7	9	0	0.437	—	—	—	0	0	—	—	0	—
12	Joseph J. Rothrock	1927–1928	2	16	4	11	1	0.281	—	—	—	0	0	—	—	0	—
13	Gus Ziegler	1929–1930	2	18	6	10	2	0.389	—	—	—	0	0	—	—	0	—
14	Charles Rogers	1931–1933	3	25	12	9	4	0.560	—	—	—	0	0	—	—	0	—
15	Skip Stahley	1934	1	8	4	3	1	0.563	—	—	—	0	0	—	—	0	—
16	Lyal Clark	1935–1937	3	24	5	18	1	0.230	—	—	—	0	0	—	—	0	—
17	Stephen Grenda	1938–1939	2	16	4	12	0	0.250	—	—	—	0	0	—	—	0	—
18	William D. Murray^{†}	1940–1950	11	67	49	16	2	0.747	3	0	1.000	1	0	—	1	1	—
19	David M. Nelson^{†}	1951–1965	15	128	84	42	2	0.664	26	15	0.634	1	0	—	3	1	—
20	Tubby Raymond^{†}	1966–2001	36	422	300	119	3	0.714	108	41	0.725	21	15	1	9	3	AFCA College Division Coach of the Year (1971–1972)
21	K. C. Keeler	2002–2012	11	138	86	52	—	0.623	49	41	0.544	11	3	1	3	1	AFCA Coach of the Year (2010); Liberty Mutual Coach of the Year Award (2010)
22	Dave Brock	2013−2016	4	41	19	22	—	0.463	11	16	0.407	0	0	0	0	0	—
int	Dennis Dottin-Carter	2016	1	5	2	3	—	0.400	2	3	0.400	0	0	0	0	0	—
23	Danny Rocco	2017–2021	5	54	31	23	—	0.574	20	16	0.556	2	2	1	1	0	—
24	Ryan Carty	2022–present	5	50	33	17	—	0.660	20	12	0.625	2	1	0	0	0	—
