= 2012 William & Mary Tribe football team =

American college football season

2012 William & Mary Tribe football
- Conference: Colonial Athletic Association
- Record: 2–9 (1–7 CAA)
- Head coach: Jimmye Laycock (33rd season)
- Offensive coordinator: Zbig Kepa (20th season)
- Defensive coordinator: Scott Boone (2nd season)
- Captains: Jabrel Mines; Brian Thompson
- Home stadium: Zable Stadium

2012 Colonial Athletic Association football standings
	Conf.			Overall
Team	W		L	W		L
No. 6 Old Dominion ^	7	–	1	11	–	2
No. 18 Richmond +	6	–	2	8	–	3
No. 13 New Hampshire +^	6	–	2	8	–	4
No. 15 Villanova +^	6	–	2	8	–	4
No. 17 Towson +	6	–	2	7	–	4
No. 19 James Madison	5	–	3	7	–	4
Maine	4	–	4	5	–	6
Delaware	2	–	6	5	–	6
William & Mary	1	–	7	2	–	9
Rhode Island	0	–	8	0	–	11
Georgia State	0	–	0	1	–	10
+ – Conference co-champions; ^ – FCS playoff participant; Georgia State's conference record was 0–0, and it did not occupy a spot in the overall standings. Old Dominion was ineligible for the conference championship because of its announced departure for Conference USA in 2013.; Rankings from The Sports Network poll

The 2012 William & Mary Tribe football team represented The College of William & Mary in the 2012 NCAA Division I FCS football season. The Tribe were led by 33rd year head coach Jimmye Laycock and played their home games at Zable Stadium. They are a member of the Colonial Athletic Association. They finished the season 2–9, 1–7 in CAA play to finish in ninth place.

== Schedule ==
Date	Time	Opponent	Site	TV	Result	Attendance
September 1	3:00 pm	at Maryland*	Byrd Stadium; College Park, MD	ESPN3	L 6–7	31,321
September 8	7:00 pm	Lafayette*	Zable Stadium; Williamsburg, VA		L 14–17	7,615
September 15	12:00 pm	at No. 12 Towson	Johnny Unitas Stadium; Towson, MD	NBCSN	L 17–20	8,309
September 22	7:00 pm	No. 12 Delaware	Zable Stadium; Williamsburg, VA (rivalry)	CSN	L 21–51	10,601
September 29	7:00 pm	Georgia State	Zable Stadium; Williamsburg, VA	CSN	W 35–3	11,125
October 6	3:30 pm	at Penn*	Franklin Field; Philadelphia, PA	PSN	W 34–28	8,101
October 13	3:30 pm	at No. 4 James Madison	Bridgeforth Stadium; Harrisonburg, VA	CSN	L 26–27 ^{2OT}	22,271
October 27	3:30 pm	Maine^{†}	Zable Stadium; Williamsburg, VA		L 10–24	10,398
November 3	12:00 pm	at No. 11 New Hampshire	Cowell Stadium; Durham, NH		L 25–28	5,521
November 10	12:00 pm	at No. 4 Old Dominion	Foreman Field; Norfolk, VA (rivalry)		L 31–41	20,068
November 17	1:30 pm	No. 20 Richmond	Zable Stadium; Williamsburg, VA (Capital Cup)		L 14–21	9,682
*Non-conference game; ^{†}Homecoming; Rankings from The Sports Network Poll released prior to the game; All times are in Eastern time
