= 2012 Old Dominion Monarchs football team =

American college football season

2012 Old Dominion Monarchs football

Lambert Cup winner

FCS Playoffs Quarterfinal, L 35–49 vs. Georgia Southern
- Conference: Colonial Athletic Association

Ranking
- Sports Network: No. 6
- FCS Coaches: No. 6
- Record: 11–2 (7–1 CAA)
- Head coach: Bobby Wilder (4th season)
- Offensive coordinator: Brian Scott (4th season)
- Offensive scheme: Hurry-up spread option
- Defensive coordinator: Bill Dee (1st season)
- Base defense: Multiple
- Home stadium: Foreman Field at S. B. Ballard Stadium

2012 Colonial Athletic Association football standings
	Conf.			Overall
Team	W		L	W		L
No. 6 Old Dominion ^	7	–	1	11	–	2
No. 18 Richmond +	6	–	2	8	–	3
No. 13 New Hampshire +^	6	–	2	8	–	4
No. 15 Villanova +^	6	–	2	8	–	4
No. 17 Towson +	6	–	2	7	–	4
No. 19 James Madison	5	–	3	7	–	4
Maine	4	–	4	5	–	6
Delaware	2	–	6	5	–	6
William & Mary	1	–	7	2	–	9
Rhode Island	0	–	8	0	–	11
Georgia State	0	–	0	1	–	10
+ – Conference co-champions; ^ – FCS playoff participant; Georgia State's conference record was 0–0, and it did not occupy a spot in the overall standings. Old Dominion was ineligible for the conference championship because of its announced departure for Conference USA in 2013.; Rankings from The Sports Network poll

The 2012 Old Dominion Monarchs football team represented Old Dominion University in the 2012 NCAA Division I FCS football season. They were led by fourth-year head coach Bobby Wilder and played their home games at Foreman Field at S. B. Ballard Stadium. This was their final year as a member of the Colonial Athletic Association (CAA). In 2013, they began a two-year transition to the NCAA Division I Football Bowl Subdivision (FBS), where they became a member of Conference USA. They finished the season 11–2, 7–1 in CAA play to finish in first place. As a departing member from the CAA, they were ineligible for the CAA championship. They received an at–large bid to the FCS Playoffs, where they defeated Coastal Carolina in the second round before falling in the quarterfinals to Georgia Southern.

== Schedule ==
Date	Time	Opponent	Rank	Site	TV	Result	Attendance
September 1	6:00 p.m.	Duquesne*	No. 8	Foreman Field; Norfolk, VA		W 57–23	19,818
September 8	6:00 p.m.	at Hampton*	No. 7	Armstrong Stadium; Hampton, VA		W 45–7	5,500
September 15	6:00 p.m.	Campbell*	No. 6	Foreman Field; Norfolk, VA		W 70–14	20,068
September 22	12:00 p.m.	No. 18 New Hampshire	No. 5	Foreman Field; Norfolk, VA	CSN	W 64–61	20,068
September 29	3:30 p.m.	at Richmond	No. 4	E. Claiborne Robins Stadium; Richmond, VA		W 45–37	8,700
October 13	3:30 p.m.	Villanova^{†}	No. 3	Foreman Field; Norfolk, VA		L 14–38	20,068
October 20	7:00 p.m.	at No. 18 Towson	No. 7	Johnny Unitas Stadium; Towson, MD		W 31–20	7,817
October 27	12:00 p.m.	No. 20 Delaware	No. 6	Foreman Field; Norfolk, VA (Oyster Bowl)	NBCSN	W 31–26	20,068
November 3	3:30 p.m.	at Georgia State	No. 5	Georgia Dome; Atlanta, GA		W 53–27	12,293
November 10	12:00 p.m.	William & Mary	No. 4	Foreman Field; Norfolk, VA (Battle for the Silver Mace)		W 41–31	20,068
November 17	7:00 p.m.	at No. 13 James Madison	No. 4	Bridgeforth Stadium; Harrisonburg, VA (rivalry)	NBCSN	W 38–28	23,051
December 1	2:00 p.m.	Coastal Carolina*	No. 3	Foreman Field; Norfolk, VA (FCS Second Round)	ESPN3	W 63–35	20,068
December 8	12:00 p.m.	No. 6 Georgia Southern*	No. 3	Foreman Field; Norfolk, VA (FCS Quarterfinal)	ESPN	L 35–49	20,068
*Non-conference game; ^{†}Homecoming; Rankings from The Sports Network Poll released prior to the game; All times are in Eastern time

== Heinicke's record year ==
In ODU's 64–61 comeback win over New Hampshire, sophomore quarterback Taylor Heinicke set his first of many records that season. He passed for 730 yards and compiled 791 yards of total offense, setting new Division I records for a single game.

During the loss to Georgia Southern in the FCS playoff quarterfinals, Heinicke passed Steve McNair for the most passing yards in a single season by an FCS quarterback with 5,076 yards. He also became the first quarterback to eclipse the 5,000 yard mark in a season as well as setting the record for most completions in a season with 398 (Villanova's Brett Gordon held the previous record of 386 in 2002). At the conclusion of the season he led the nation in passing yards, passing yards per game, total offense, points responsible for, touchdown passes and total touchdowns.

For his performance and record-setting season Heinicke was named CAA Offensive Player of the Year, a first team All-American, the Dudley Award winner, the FCS Player of the Year, and the Walter Payton Award winner.

Joining Heinicke as All-Americans were teammates P Jonathan Plisco, DT Chris Burnette, WR Nick Mayers, LT Jack Lowney, and LS Rick Lovato.

== Rankings ==
Ranking movements Legend: ██ Increase in ranking ██ Decrease in ranking
	Week													
Poll	Pre	1	2	3	4	5	6	7	8	9	10	11	12	Final
Sports Network	8	7	6	5	4	4	3	7	6	5	4	4	3	6
Coaches	6	5	4	5	4	4	3	8	7	5	4	4	3	6

== Awards ==
- All-Americans

Taylor Heinicke - QB
Jonathan Plisco - P
Chris Burnette - DT
Nick Mayers - WR
Jack Lowney - LT
Rick Lovato - LS

- Walter Payton Award

Taylor Heinicke - QB

- FCS Player of the Year

Taylor Heinicke - QB

- CAA Offensive Player of the Year

Taylor Heinicke - QB

- American Football Monthly FCS Coach of the Year

Bobby Wilder

- Old Dominion was named the winner of the Lambert Cup as the best FCS team in the East.
