= 2012 Wagner Seahawks football team =

American college football season

2012 Wagner Seahawks football
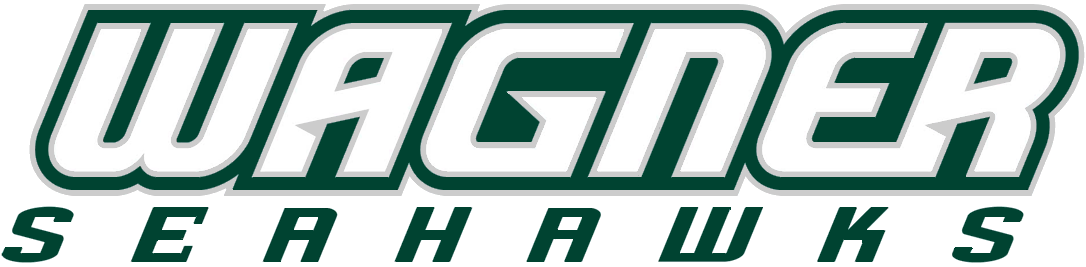

NEC co-champion

NCAA Division I Second Round, L 19–29 vs. Eastern Washington
- Conference: Northeast Conference

Ranking
- Sports Network: No. 21
- FCS Coaches: No. 22
- Record: 9–4 (7–1 NEC)
- Head coach: Walt Hameline (32nd season)
- Offensive coordinator: Jason Houghtaling (1st season)
- Defensive coordinator: Malik Hall (1st season)
- Home stadium: Wagner College Stadium

2012 Northeast Conference football standings
	Conf.			Overall
Team	W		L	W		L
No. 21 Wagner +^	7	–	1	9	–	4
Albany +	7	–	1	9	–	2
Monmouth	4	–	3	5	–	5
Saint Francis (PA)	4	–	4	5	–	6
Bryant	4	–	4	4	–	7
Robert Morris	3	–	5	4	–	7
Duquesne	3	–	5	5	–	6
Central Connecticut	2	–	5	2	–	8
Sacred Heart	1	–	7	2	–	9
+ – Conference co-champions; ^ – FCS playoff participant; Rankings from The Sports Network poll

The 2012 Wagner Seahawks football team represented Wagner College in the 2012 NCAA Division I FCS football season as a member of the Northeast Conference (NEC). They were led by 32nd-year head coach Walt Hameline and played their home games at Wagner College Stadium. They are a member of the Northeast Conference. Wagner finished the season 9–4 overall 7–1 in NEC play to share the conference title with Albany. The Seahawks earned the conference's automatic bid into the NCAA Division I Football Championship playoffs, the first playoff appearance in school history, where they defeated Colgate in the first round before falling in the second round to Eastern Washington.

== Schedule ==
Date	Time	Opponent	Site	TV	Result	Attendance
August 31	8:00 p.m.	at Florida Atlantic*	FAU Stadium; Boca Raton, FL	ESPN3	L 3–7	14,510
September 8	1:00 p.m.	at Georgetown*	Multi-Sport Field; Washington, DC		L 10–13	2,147
September 15	1:00 p.m.	Monmouth	Wagner College Stadium; Staten Island, NY		L 17–38	2,610
September 22	7:00 p.m.	at Central Connecticut	Arute Field; New Britain, CT	FCS/MSG	W 31–13	4,515
September 29	1:00 p.m.	Bryant	Wagner College Stadium; Staten Island, NY		W 31–21	2,037
October 6	1:00 p.m.	at Sacred Heart	Campus Field; Fairfield, CT		W 12–3	1,281
October 20	Noon	at Saint Francis (PA)	DeGol Field; Loretto, PA		W 31–24	1,931
October 27	1:00 p.m.	Robert Morris^{†}	Wagner College Stadium; Staten Island, NY		W 23–13	2,072
November 3	1:00 p.m.	at No. 20 Albany	University Field; Albany, NY		W 30–0	2,617
November 10	1:00 p.m.	Holy Cross*	Wagner College Stadium; Staten Island, NY		W 31–30	1,668
November 17	1:00 p.m.	Duquesne	Wagner College Stadium; Staten Island, NY		W 23–17	2,692
November 24	Noon	No. 24 Colgate*	Wagner College Stadium; Staten Island, NY (NCAA Division I First Round)	ESPN3	W 31–20	3,032
December 1	6:00 p.m.	at No. 4 Eastern Washington*	Roos Field; Cheney, WA (NCAA Division I Second Round)	ESPN3	L 19–29	7,039
*Non-conference game; ^{†}Homecoming; Rankings from The Sports Network Poll released prior to the game; All times are in Eastern time
