= 2012 Albany Great Danes football team =

American college football season

2012 Albany Great Danes football

NEC co-champion
- Conference: Northeast Conference
- Record: 9–2 (7–1 NEC)
- Head coach: Bob Ford (43rd season)
- Offensive coordinator: Ryan McCarthy (5th season)
- Defensive coordinator: Mike Simpson (26th season)
- Home stadium: University Field

2012 Northeast Conference football standings
	Conf.			Overall
Team	W		L	W		L
No. 21 Wagner +^	7	–	1	9	–	4
Albany +	7	–	1	9	–	2
Monmouth	4	–	3	5	–	5
Saint Francis (PA)	4	–	4	5	–	6
Bryant	4	–	4	4	–	7
Robert Morris	3	–	5	4	–	7
Duquesne	3	–	5	5	–	6
Central Connecticut	2	–	5	2	–	8
Sacred Heart	1	–	7	2	–	9
+ – Conference co-champions; ^ – FCS playoff participant; Rankings from The Sports Network poll

The 2012 Albany Great Danes football team represented the University at Albany, SUNY as a member of the Northeast Conference (NEC) during the 2012 NCAA Division I FCS football season. Led by 43rd-year head coach Bob Ford, the Great Danes compiled an overall record of 9–2 with a mark of 7–1 in conference play, sharing the NEC title with Wagner. Due to Albany's head-to-head loss to Wagner, the Seahawks eared the conference's automatic bid NCAA Division I Football Championship playoffs. The Great Danes did not receive an at-large bid. The team played home games at University Field in Albany, New York for the final season as Bob Ford Field opened the next year. 2012 was also Albany's final season of competition in the NEC as the Great Danes joined the Colonial Athletic Association (CAA) in 2013.

== Schedule ==
Date	Time	Opponent	Rank	Site	TV	Result	Attendance
September 1	6:00 pm	Colgate*		University Field; Albany, NY		W 40–23	6,194
September 8	12:00 pm	at Robert Morris		Joe Walton Stadium; Moon Township, PA		W 35–10	1,068
September 15	4:00 pm	at No. 5 Youngstown State*		Stambaugh Stadium; Youngstown, OH		L 24–31	15,840
September 22	6:00 pm	at No. 23 Maine*		Alfond Stadium; Orono, ME		W 30–20	7,101
September 29	1:00 pm	Monmouth		University Field; Albany, NY		W 55–24	2,482
October 6	12:00 pm	at Bryant		Bulldog Stadium; Smithfield, RI	FCS, TW3, ESPN3	W 31–14	1,219
October 13	1:00 pm	Saint Francis (PA)^{†}		University Field; Albany, NY		W 36–13	6,852
October 27	1:00 pm	at Sacred Heart	No. 24	Campus Field; Fairfield, CT		W 23–20	3,505
November 3	1:00 pm	Wagner	No. 20	University Field; Albany, NY		L 0–30	2,617
November 10	12:00 pm	at Duquesne		Arthur J. Rooney Athletic Field; Pittsburgh, PA		W 38–31	2,193
November 17	1:00 pm	Central Connecticut		University Field; Albany, NY	TW3	W 63–34	1,876
*Non-conference game; ^{†}Homecoming; Rankings from The Sports Network Poll released prior to the game; All times are in Eastern time
