= 2012 Villanova Wildcats football team =

American college football season

2012 Villanova Wildcats football

CAA co-champion

FCS Playoffs First Round, L 10–20 vs. Stony Brook
- Conference: Colonial Athletic Association

Ranking
- Sports Network: No. 14
- FCS Coaches: No. 18
- Record: 8–4 (6–2 CAA)
- Head coach: Andy Talley (28th season)
- Offensive coordinator: Sam Venuto (14th season)
- Offensive scheme: Multiple spread
- Defensive coordinator: Billy Crocker (1st season)
- Base defense: 3–3–5
- Home stadium: Villanova Stadium

2012 Colonial Athletic Association football standings
	Conf.			Overall
Team	W		L	W		L
No. 6 Old Dominion ^	7	–	1	11	–	2
No. 18 Richmond +	6	–	2	8	–	3
No. 13 New Hampshire +^	6	–	2	8	–	4
No. 15 Villanova +^	6	–	2	8	–	4
No. 17 Towson +	6	–	2	7	–	4
No. 19 James Madison	5	–	3	7	–	4
Maine	4	–	4	5	–	6
Delaware	2	–	6	5	–	6
William & Mary	1	–	7	2	–	9
Rhode Island	0	–	8	0	–	11
Georgia State	0	–	0	1	–	10
+ – Conference co-champions; ^ – FCS playoff participant; Georgia State's conference record was 0–0, and it did not occupy a spot in the overall standings. Old Dominion was ineligible for the conference championship because of its announced departure for Conference USA in 2013.; Rankings from The Sports Network poll

The 2012 Villanova Wildcats football team represented Villanova University in the 2012 NCAA Division I FCS football season. They were led by 28th-year head coach Andy Talley and played their home games at Villanova Stadium. They are a member of the Colonial Athletic Association (CAA). They finished the season 8–4, 6–2 in CAA play. Due to Old Dominion (7–1 in CAA play) being ineligible for the CAA title, the Wildcats finished in a four-way tie for the CAA championship. They received the CAA's automatic bid into the FCS playoffs where they lost in the first round to Stony Brook.

== Schedule ==
Date	Time	Opponent	Rank	Site	TV	Result	Attendance
August 31	7:00 pm	at Temple*		Lincoln Financial Field; Philadelphia, PA (Mayor's Cup)	ESPN3	L 10–41	32,709
September 8	6:00 pm	Fordham*		Villanova Stadium; Villanova, PA		W 28–13	3,717
September 15	3:30 pm	Rhode Island		Villanova Stadium; Villanova, PA	CSN	W 31–10	10,513
September 22	3:30 pm	at Penn*		Franklin Field; Philadelphia, PA	CSNPA	W 24–8	13,803
September 29	3:30 pm	at Maine		Alfond Stadium; Orono, ME		W 35–14	3,472
October 6	6:00 pm	Richmond		Villanova Stadium; Villanova, PA		L 17–28	7,117
October 13	3:30 pm	at No. 3 Old Dominion		Foreman Field; Norfolk, VA		W 38–14	20,068
October 20	3:30 pm	at Georgia State	No. 24	Georgia Dome; Atlanta, GA		W 49–24	12,136
October 27	3:30 pm	No. 23 Towson^{†}	No. 19	Villanova Stadium; Villanova, PA	CSN	L 35–49	7,757
November 10	1:00 pm	No. 9 James Madison	No. 21	Villanova Stadium; Villanova, PA		W 35–20	6,617
November 17	3:30 pm	at Delaware	No. 16	Delaware Stadium; Newark, DE (Battle of the Blue)		W 41–10	19,523
November 24	3:00 pm	at No. 10 Stony Brook*	No. 14	Kenneth P. LaValle Stadium; Stony Brook, NY (NCAA Division I First Round)	ESPN3	L 10–20	4,905
*Non-conference game; ^{†}Homecoming; Rankings from The Sports Network Poll released prior to the game; All times are in Eastern time
