= 2012 New Hampshire Wildcats football team =

American college football season

2012 New Hampshire Wildcats football

Colonial Athletic Association co-champion

FCS Playoffs Second Round, L 7–23 vs. Wofford
- Conference: Colonial Athletic Association

Ranking
- Sports Network: No. 11
- FCS Coaches: No. 13
- Record: 8–4 (6–2 CAA)
- Head coach: Sean McDonnell (14th season)
- Offensive coordinator: Ryan Carty (1st season)
- Defensive coordinator: John Lyons (2nd season)
- Home stadium: Cowell Stadium

2012 Colonial Athletic Association football standings
	Conf.			Overall
Team	W		L	W		L
No. 6 Old Dominion ^	7	–	1	11	–	2
No. 18 Richmond +	6	–	2	8	–	3
No. 13 New Hampshire +^	6	–	2	8	–	4
No. 15 Villanova +^	6	–	2	8	–	4
No. 17 Towson +	6	–	2	7	–	4
No. 19 James Madison	5	–	3	7	–	4
Maine	4	–	4	5	–	6
Delaware	2	–	6	5	–	6
William & Mary	1	–	7	2	–	9
Rhode Island	0	–	8	0	–	11
Georgia State	0	–	0	1	–	10
+ – Conference co-champions; ^ – FCS playoff participant; Georgia State's conference record was 0–0, and it did not occupy a spot in the overall standings. Old Dominion was ineligible for the conference championship because of its announced departure for Conference USA in 2013.; Rankings from The Sports Network poll

The 2012 New Hampshire Wildcats football team represented the University of New Hampshire in the 2012 NCAA Division I FCS football season. They were led by 14th-year head coach Sean McDonnell and played their home games at Cowell Stadium. They are a member of the Colonial Athletic Association. They finished the season 8–4, 6–2 in CAA play. Due to Old Dominion (7–1 in CAA play) being ineligible for the CAA title, the Wildcats finished in a four way tie for the CAA championship. They received an at-large bid into the FCS playoffs where they lost in the second round to Wofford.

== Schedule ==
Date	Time	Opponent	Rank	Site	TV	Result	Attendance
August 30	7:30 pm	at Holy Cross*	No. 14	Fitton Field; Worcester, MA		W 38–17	12,291
September 8	12:00 pm	at Minnesota*	No. 14	TCF Bank Stadium; Minneapolis, MN	BTN	L 7–44	47,022
September 15	12:00 pm	Central Connecticut*	No. 18	Cowell Stadium; Durham, NH	UNHTV	W 43–10	7,784
September 22	12:00 pm	at No. 5 Old Dominion	No. 18	Foreman Field; Norfolk, VA	CSN	L 61–64	20,068
September 29	12:00 pm	No. 8 Delaware	No. 20	Cowell Stadium; Durham, NH	UNHTV	W 34–14	7,058
October 6	3:30 pm	at Georgia State	No. 14	Georgia Dome; Atlanta, GA		W 44–21	9,531
October 13	12:00 pm	Richmond^{†}	No. 12	Cowell Stadium; Durham, NH	UNHTV	W 44–40	12,834
October 20	12:00 pm	at Maine	No. 12	Alfond Stadium; Orono, ME (Battle for the Brice–Cowell Musket)	CSN	W 28–21	4,873
October 27	12:00 pm	at Rhode Island	No. 12	Meade Stadium; Kingston, RI		W 40–20	5,127
November 3	12:00 pm	William & Mary	No. 11	Cowell Stadium; Durham, NH	UNHTV	W 28–25	5,521
November 17	12:00 pm	No. 19 Towson	No. 7	Cowell Stadium; Durham, NH	CSN	L 35–64	5,531
December 1	2:00 pm	at No. 9 Wofford*	No. 11	Gibbs Stadium; Spartanburg, SC (NCAA Division I Second Round)	ESPN3	L 7–23	6,346
*Non-conference game; ^{†}Homecoming; Rankings from The Sports Network Poll released prior to the game; All times are in Eastern time

- Source: Schedule

== Ranking movements ==
Ranking movements Legend: ██ Increase in ranking ██ Decrease in ranking
	Week																
Poll	Pre	1	2	3	4	5	6	7	8	9	10	11	12	13	14	15	Final
Sports Network	14	14	18	18	20	14	12	12	12	11	10	7	11				
Coaches	12	12	18	19	22	17	13	14	12	11	10	7	13				
