= 2012 Towson Tigers football team =

American college football season

2012 Towson Tigers football

CAA co-champion
- Conference: Colonial Athletic Association

Ranking
- Sports Network: No. 15
- FCS Coaches: No. 14
- Record: 7–4 (6–2 CAA)
- Head coach: Rob Ambrose (4th season)
- Offensive coordinator: Jared Ambrose (1st season)
- Defensive coordinator: Matt Hachmann
- Home stadium: Johnny Unitas Stadium

2012 Colonial Athletic Association football standings
	Conf.			Overall
Team	W		L	W		L
No. 6 Old Dominion ^	7	–	1	11	–	2
No. 18 Richmond +	6	–	2	8	–	3
No. 13 New Hampshire +^	6	–	2	8	–	4
No. 15 Villanova +^	6	–	2	8	–	4
No. 17 Towson +	6	–	2	7	–	4
No. 19 James Madison	5	–	3	7	–	4
Maine	4	–	4	5	–	6
Delaware	2	–	6	5	–	6
William & Mary	1	–	7	2	–	9
Rhode Island	0	–	8	0	–	11
Georgia State	0	–	0	1	–	10
+ – Conference co-champions; ^ – FCS playoff participant; Georgia State's conference record was 0–0, and it did not occupy a spot in the overall standings. Old Dominion was ineligible for the conference championship because of its announced departure for Conference USA in 2013.; Rankings from The Sports Network poll

The 2012 Towson Tigers football team represented Towson University in the 2012 NCAA Division I FCS football season. They were led by fourth-year head coach Rob Ambrose and played their home games at Johnny Unitas Stadium. They are a member of the Colonial Athletic Association (CAA). They finished the season 7–4, 6–2 in CAA. Due to Old Dominion (7–1 in CAA play) being ineligible for the conference title, the Tigers claimed a four way share of the CAA title. Despite the conference title, the Tigers were not invited to the FCS playoffs.

== Schedule ==
Date	Time	Opponent	Rank	Site	TV	Result	Attendance
August 30	7:00 pm	at Kent State*	No. 7	Dix Stadium; Kent, OH	CSNMA+	L 21–41	15,121
September 15	12:00 pm	William & Mary	No. 12	Johnny Unitas Stadium; Towson, MD	NBCSN	W 20–17	8,309
September 22	7:00 pm	Saint Francis (PA)*^{†}	No. 13	Johnny Unitas Stadium; Towson, MD		W 46–17	9,828
September 29	7:00 pm	at No. 3 (FBS) LSU*	No. 12	Tiger Stadium; Baton Rouge, LA	ESPNU	L 22–38	92,154
October 6	1:00 pm	at No. 5 James Madison	No. 12	Bridgeforth Stadium; Harrisonburg, VA	NBCSN	L 10–13	25,077
October 13	7:00 pm	Maine	No. 17	Johnny Unitas Stadium; Towson, MD		W 24–19	10,141
October 20	7:00 pm	No. 7 Old Dominion	No. 18	Johnny Unitas Stadium; Towson, MD		L 20–31	7,817
October 27	3:30 pm	at No. 19 Villanova	No. 23	Villanova Stadium; Villanova, PA	CSNMA	W 49–35	7,757
November 3	12:00 pm	at No. 23 Delaware	No. 19	Delaware Stadium; Newark, DE	NBCSN	W 34–27 ^{OT}	16,252
November 10	3:30 pm	Rhode Island	No. 17	Johnny Unitas Stadium; Towson, MD		W 41–10	7,362
November 17	12:00 pm	at No. 7 New Hampshire	No. 19	Cowell Stadium; Durham, NH	CSNMA	W 64–35	5,531
*Non-conference game; ^{†}Homecoming; Rankings from The Sports Network Poll released prior to the game; All times are in Eastern time

== Ranking movements ==
Ranking movements Legend: ██ Increase in ranking ██ Decrease in ranking
	Week													
Poll	Pre	1	2	3	4	5	6	7	8	9	10	11	12	Final
Sports Network	7	13	12	13	12	12	17	18	23	19	17	19	15	
Coaches	9	16	15	16	13	12	19	19	25	22	17	16	14	
