= 2012 Richmond Spiders football team =

American college football season

2012 Richmond Spiders football

CAA co-champion
- Conference: Colonial Athletic Association

Ranking
- Sports Network: No. 18
- FCS Coaches: No. 18
- Record: 8–3 (6–2 CAA)
- Head coach: Danny Rocco (1st season)
- Offensive coordinator: Brandon Streeter (1st season)
- Defensive coordinator: Bob Trott (3rd season)
- Home stadium: E. Claiborne Robins Stadium

2012 Colonial Athletic Association football standings
	Conf.			Overall
Team	W		L	W		L
No. 6 Old Dominion ^	7	–	1	11	–	2
No. 18 Richmond +	6	–	2	8	–	3
No. 13 New Hampshire +^	6	–	2	8	–	4
No. 15 Villanova +^	6	–	2	8	–	4
No. 17 Towson +	6	–	2	7	–	4
No. 19 James Madison	5	–	3	7	–	4
Maine	4	–	4	5	–	6
Delaware	2	–	6	5	–	6
William & Mary	1	–	7	2	–	9
Rhode Island	0	–	8	0	–	11
Georgia State	0	–	0	1	–	10
+ – Conference co-champions; ^ – FCS playoff participant; Georgia State's conference record was 0–0, and it did not occupy a spot in the overall standings. Old Dominion was ineligible for the conference championship because of its announced departure for Conference USA in 2013.; Rankings from The Sports Network poll

The 2012 Richmond Spiders football team represented the University of Richmond in the 2012 NCAA Division I FCS football season. They were led by first-year head coach Danny Rocco and played their home games at E. Claiborne Robins Stadium. They were a member of the Colonial Athletic Association. They finished the season 8–3, 6–2 in CAA. Due to Old Dominion (7–1 in CAA play) being ineligible for the conference title, the Spiders claimed a four way share of the CAA title. Despite the conference title, the Spiders were not invited to the FCS playoffs.

== Schedule ==
Date	Time	Opponent	Rank	Site	TV	Result	Attendance
September 1	3:00 pm	at Virginia*		Scott Stadium; Charlottesville, VA	ACCRSN	L 19–43	50,081
September 8	6:00 pm	Gardner–Webb*		Robins Stadium; Richmond, VA		W 41–8	8,700
September 15	1:30 pm	at VMI*		Alumni Memorial Field; Lexington, VA (rivalry)		W 47–6	6,827
September 22	3:30 pm	at Georgia State		Georgia Dome; Atlanta, GA		W 35–14	9,476
September 29	3:30 pm	No. 4 Old Dominion		Robins Stadium; Richmond, VA		L 37–45	8,700
October 6	6:00 pm	at Villanova		Villanova Stadium; Villanova, PA		W 28–17	7,117
October 13	12:00 pm	at No. 12 New Hampshire		Cowell Stadium; Durham, NH		L 40–44	12,834
October 20	3:30 pm	No. 2 James Madison		Robins Stadium; Richmond, VA (rivalry)	CSN	W 35–29	8,700
November 3	6:00 pm	Rhode Island^{†}	No. 22	Robins Stadium; Richmond, VA		W 39–0	8,700
November 10	3:30 pm	Delaware	No. 20	Robins Stadium; Richmond, VA		W 23–17	8,700
November 17	1:30 pm	at William & Mary	No. 20	Zable Stadium; Williamsburg, VA (Capital Cup)		W 21–14	9,682
*Non-conference game; ^{†}Homecoming; Rankings from The Sports Network Poll released prior to the game; All times are in Eastern time
