= 2012 James Madison Dukes football team =

American college football season

2012 James Madison Dukes football
- Conference: Colonial Athletic Association

Ranking
- Sports Network: No. 19
- FCS Coaches: No. 21
- Record: 7–4 (5–3 CAA)
- Head coach: Mickey Matthews (14th season)
- Offensive coordinator: Jeff Durden
- Defensive coordinator: Kyle Gillenwater (4th season)
- Home stadium: Bridgeforth Stadium

2012 Colonial Athletic Association football standings
	Conf.			Overall
Team	W		L	W		L
No. 6 Old Dominion ^	7	–	1	11	–	2
No. 18 Richmond +	6	–	2	8	–	3
No. 13 New Hampshire +^	6	–	2	8	–	4
No. 15 Villanova +^	6	–	2	8	–	4
No. 17 Towson +	6	–	2	7	–	4
No. 19 James Madison	5	–	3	7	–	4
Maine	4	–	4	5	–	6
Delaware	2	–	6	5	–	6
William & Mary	1	–	7	2	–	9
Rhode Island	0	–	8	0	–	11
Georgia State	0	–	0	1	–	10
+ – Conference co-champions; ^ – FCS playoff participant; Georgia State's conference record was 0–0, and it did not occupy a spot in the overall standings. Old Dominion was ineligible for the conference championship because of its announced departure for Conference USA in 2013.; Rankings from The Sports Network poll

The 2012 James Madison Dukes football team represented James Madison University in the 2012 NCAA Division I FCS football season. They were led by 14th year head coach Mickey Matthews and played their home games at Bridgeforth Stadium and Zane Showker Field. They are a member of the Colonial Athletic Association. They finished the season 7–4, 5–3 in CAA play to finish in sixth place.

== Schedule ==
Date	Time	Opponent	Rank	Site	TV	Result	Attendance
September 1	6:00 pm	St. Francis (PA)*	No. 5	Bridgeforth Stadium; Harrisonburg, VA		W 55–7	23,248
September 8	6:00 pm	Alcorn State*	No. 5	Bridgeforth Stadium; Harrisonburg, VA		W 42–3	20,239
September 15	4:30 pm	vs. No. 9 (FBS) West Virginia*	No. 4	FedExField; Landover, MD	ROOT	L 12–42	45,511
September 22	1:00 pm	at Rhode Island	No. 6	Meade Stadium; Kingston, RI		W 32–7	4,203
October 6	1:00 pm	No. 12 Towson	No. 5	Bridgeforth Stadium; Harrisonburg, VA	NBCSN	W 13–10	25,077
October 13	3:30 pm	William & Mary	No. 4	Bridgeforth Stadium; Harrisonburg, VA (rivalry)	CSN	W 27–26 ^{2OT}	22,271
October 20	3:30 pm	at Richmond	No. 2	E. Claiborne Robins Stadium; Richmond, VA (rivalry)	CSN	L 29–35	8,700
October 27	3:30 pm	Georgia State^{†}	No. 9	Bridgeforth Stadium; Harrisonburg, VA		W 28–21	22,813
November 3	3:30 pm	at Maine	No. 10	Alfond Stadium; Orono, ME	CSN	W 31–7	2,951
November 10	1:00 pm	at No. 21 Villanova	No. 9	Villanova Stadium; Villanova, PA		L 20–35	6,617
November 17	7:00 pm	No. 4 Old Dominion	No. 13	Bridgeforth Stadium; Harrisonburg, VA (rivalry)	NBCSN	L 28–38	23,051
*Non-conference game; ^{†}Homecoming; Rankings from The Sports Network FCS Poll released prior to game Poll released prior to the game; All times are in Eastern time

- Source: Schedule

== Ranking movements ==
Ranking movements Legend: ██ Increase in ranking ██ Decrease in ranking
	Week													
Poll	Pre	1	2	3	4	5	6	7	8	9	10	11	12	Final
Sports Network	5	5	4	6	5	5	4	2	9	10	9	13	17	19
Coaches	8	6	5	7	6	6	5	2	10	10	9	14	20	21
