= Danny Rocco =

American football player and coach (born 1960)

Current position
- Title: Senior offensive analyst
- Team: Virginia Tech
- Conference: ACC

Biographical details
- Born: July 16, 1960 (age 66); Huntingdon, Pennsylvania, U.S.

Playing career
- 1979–1980: Penn State
- 1981–1983: Wake Forest
- Position: Linebacker

Coaching career (HC unless noted)
- 1984–1985: Wake Forest (GA)
- 1986: Wake Forest (DL)
- 1987: Colorado (MLB)
- 1988–1990: Tulsa (OLB)
- 1991–1993: Boston College (DL)
- 1994–1996: Texas (OLB)
- 1997: Texas (ST/DE)
- 1998–1999: Maryland (OLB)
- 2000: New York Jets (ST)
- 2001–2005: Virginia (LB)
- 2006–2011: Liberty
- 2012–2016: Richmond
- 2017–2021: Delaware
- 2022: Penn State (DA)
- 2023–2025: VMI
- 2026–present: Virginia Tech (OA)

Head coaching record
- Overall: 128–93
- Tournaments: 7–5 (NCAA D-I playoffs)

Accomplishments and honors

Championships
- 4 Big South (2007–2010); 3 CAA (2012, 2015, 2020)

Awards
- 3× Big South Coach of the Year (2006–2008); 2× CAA Coach of the Year (2015, 2020)

Daniel Christopher Rocco (born July 16, 1960) is an American football coach. He is a senior offensive analyst for the Virginia Tech Hokies. Rocco served as the head football coach at Liberty University from 2006 to 2011, the University of Richmond from 2012 to 2015, the University of Delaware from 2017 to 2021, and the Virginia Military Institute from 2023 to 2025. He was assistant coach for the New York Jets of the National Football League (NFL) in 2000. Rocco played college football as a linebacker, first at Pennsylvania State University before transferring to Wake Forest University.

== Playing career and education ==
Rocco played linebacker for Joe Paterno at Pennsylvania State University, earning letters in 1979 and 1980. He played in the 1979 Liberty Bowl and the 1980 Fiesta Bowl for the Nittany Lions. Rocco transferred to Wake Forest University, where he started for two seasons at outside linebacker under head coach Al Groh, in 1982 and 1983. He was named captain of the 1983 Wake Forest Demon Deacons football team.

Rocco earned his bachelor's degree in speech communication from Wake Forest University in 1984. He added an education and counseling master's degree from Wake Forest in 1987.

== Coaching career ==
Throughout his coaching career, Rocco has been a friend and protégé of Al Groh, working with him for over six years in both collegiate and professional positions.

Rocco began his coaching career as a graduate assistant then defensive line coach at Wake Forest, from 1984 to 1986. After a season coaching linebackers at the University of Colorado at Boulder under Bill McCartney, he spent three seasons at the University of Tulsa. Next stop for Rocco was Boston College for three years under Tom Coughlin as defensive line coach.

=== Liberty ===
Rocco was named the head coach of the Flames on December 2, 2005, succeeding Ken Karcher. He began his first stint as a head coach at any level taking over a program that went 1–10 the season before he arrived in 2005.

In his first season as head coach at Liberty in 2006, he led the Flames to a 6–5 record and was honored by the Big South Conference as their Coach of the Year. He then followed that up in 2007 by leading the Flames to an 8–3 record and the school's first Big South Conference championship and his second consecutive Coach of the Year honors.

In February 2008, the university extended Rocco's contract through the 2012 season. He then followed that up with another Big South championship in 2008 with a 5–0 record in league play. He was named Big South Coach of the Year for the third straight season.

In 2009, Rocco stretched the Flames' Big South winning streak to a conference-record 15 games before falling in the season finale at Stony Brook. Liberty shared the conference championship with the Seawolves. In 2010, a loss at Coastal Carolina led to a three-way share of the league title with the Chanticleers and Stony Brook. But CCU went to the playoffs based on a tie-breaker of points allowed in conference games.

In January 2010, Rocco signed a two-year contract extension through the 2014 season.

On December 6, 2011, Rocco was named head coach at the University of Richmond.

On December 13, 2016, Rocco was named head coach at the University of Delaware. Rocco coached Delaware to a 31-23 record over five seasons. He was fired after a disappointing 2021 campaign that saw his team finish 5–6.

After spending the 2022 season as an analyst for James Franklin and Penn State, Rocco was named the new head coach at VMI, replacing Scott Wachenheim.

== Head coaching record ==
Year	Team	Overall	Conference	Standing	Bowl/playoffs	Coaches^{#}	TSN/STATS^{°}
Liberty Flames (Big South Conference) (2006–2011)
2006	Liberty	6–5	2–2	T–2nd			
2007	Liberty	8–3	4–0	1st			
2008	Liberty	10–2	5–0	1st		15	14
2009	Liberty	8–3	5–1	T–1st		21	22
2010	Liberty	8–3	5–1	T–1st		15	17
2011	Liberty	7–4	5–1	2nd		25	25
Liberty:		47–20	26–5				
Richmond Spiders (Colonial Athletic Association) (2012–2016)
2012	Richmond	8–3	6–2	T–1st		18	18
2013	Richmond	6–6	4–4	T–5th			
2014	Richmond	9–5	5–3	4th	L NCAA Division I Second Round	16	16
2015	Richmond	10–4	6–2	T–1st	L NCAA Division I Semifinal	3	4
2016	Richmond	10–4	5–3	T–4th	L NCAA Division I Quarterfinal	8	8
Richmond:		43–22	26–14				
Delaware Fightin' Blue Hens (Colonial Athletic Association) (2017–2021)
2017	Delaware	7–4	5–3	T–4th			
2018	Delaware	7–5	5–3	T–3rd	L NCAA Division I First Round	23	24
2019	Delaware	5–7	3–5	T–9th			
2020–21	Delaware	7–1	4–0	1st (North)	L NCAA Division I Semifinal	4	4
2021	Delaware	5–6	3–5	T–9th			
Delaware:		31–23	20–16				
VMI Keydets (Southern Conference) (2023–2025)
2023	VMI	5–6	4–4	T–5th			
2024	VMI	1–11	1–7	9th			
2025	VMI	1–11	0–8	9th			
VMI:		7–28	5–19				
Total:		128–93					
National championship Conference title Conference division title or championship game berth
