= 2012 NCAA Division I FCS football rankings =

The following weekly polls make up the 2012 NCAA Division I FCS football rankings which determine the top 25 teams in the NCAA Division I Football Championship Subdivision level of college football for the 2012 season. The Sports Network poll is voted on by media members while the Coaches' Poll is determined by coaches at the FCS level.

== Legend ==
Legend
	Increase in ranking
	Decrease in ranking
	Not ranked previous week
Italics	Number of first place votes
(#–#)	Win–loss record
т	Tied with team above or below also with this symbol

== The Sports Network poll ==
	Preseason Aug 13	Week 1 Sept 3	Week 2 Sept 10	Week 3 Sept 17	Week 4 Sept 24	Week 5 Oct 1	Week 6 Oct 8	Week 7 Oct 15	Week 8 Oct 22	Week 9 Oct 29	Week 10 Nov 5	Week 11 Nov 12	Week 12 Nov 19	Week 13 (Final)	
1.	Sam Houston State 79	Sam Houston State 87 (0–0)	North Dakota State 94 (2–0)	North Dakota State 140 (2–0)	North Dakota State 154 (3–0)	North Dakota State 156 (4−0)	North Dakota State 164 (5–0)	Eastern Washington 92 (5–1)	Eastern Washington 125 (6–1)	North Dakota State 59 (7–1)	North Dakota State 120 (8–1)	North Dakota State 121 (9–1)	North Dakota State 126 (10–1)	North Dakota State (14–1)	1.
2.	North Dakota State 59	North Dakota State 65 (1–0)	Sam Houston State 61 (1–0)	Montana State 9 (3–0)	Montana State 5 (4–0)	Montana State 6 (5−0)	Montana State 3 (6–0)	James Madison 42 (5–1)	Georgia Southern 14 (6–1)	Georgia Southern 76 (7–1)	Montana State 17 (8–1)	Montana State 20 (9–1)	Montana State 12 (10–1)	Sam Houston State (11–4)	2.
3.	Georgia Southern 6	Georgia Southern 4 (1–0)	Montana State 1 (2–0)	Sam Houston State 8 (1–1)	Youngstown State 10 (4–0)	Youngstown State 7 (4−0)	Old Dominion (5–0)	Georgia Southern 9 (5–1)	North Dakota State 13 (6–1)	Montana State 9 (7–1)	Sam Houston State 14 (7–2)	Sam Houston State 14 (8–2)	Old Dominion 6 (10–1)	Georgia Southern (10–4)	3.
4.	Montana State 3	Montana State 1 (1–0)	James Madison 1 (2–0)	Youngstown State 7 (3–0)	Old Dominion (4–0)	Old Dominion (5−0)	James Madison (4–1)	North Dakota State 12 (5–1)	Montana State 5 (6–1)	Sam Houston State 9 (6–2)	Old Dominion 2 (8–1)	Old Dominion 3 (9–1)	Eastern Washington (9–2)	Eastern Washington (11–3)	4.
5.	James Madison 3	James Madison (1–0)	Youngstown State 4 (2–0)	Old Dominion (3–0)	James Madison (3–1)	James Madison (3−1)	Wofford (5–0)	Montana State (6–1)	Sam Houston State 5 (5–2)	Old Dominion 2 (7–1)	Eastern Washington (7–2)	Eastern Washington (8–2)	Sam Houston State 3 (8–3)	Montana State (11–2)	5.
6.	Appalachian State 1	Youngstown State 7 (1–0)	Old Dominion (2–0)	James Madison (2–1)	Wofford (3–0)	Wofford (4−0)	Eastern Washington (4–1)	Sam Houston State 2 (4–2)	Old Dominion (6–1)	Wofford (7–1)	Stony Brook 4 (9–1)	Georgia Southern (8–2)	Georgia Southern (8–3)	Old Dominion (11–2)	6.
7.	Towson	Old Dominion (1–0)	Northern Iowa (1–1)	Wofford 1 (3–0)	Eastern Washington (2–1)	Eastern Washington (3−1)	Georgia Southern (4–1)	Old Dominion (5–1)	Wofford (6–1)	Eastern Washington (6–2)	Georgia Southern 1 (7–2)	New Hampshire 1 (8–2)	Appalachian State (8–3)	Wofford (9–4)	7.
8.	Old Dominion	Northern Iowa (0–1)	Appalachian State (1–1)	Northern Iowa (1–2)	Delaware (4–0)	Georgia Southern (3−1)	Youngstown State (4–1)	Wofford (5–1)	Lehigh 3 (8–0)	Lehigh 4 (8–0)	Lehigh 4 (9–0)	Appalachian State (8–3)	Central Arkansas (9–2)	Illinois State (9–4)	8.
9.	Northern Iowa	Eastern Washington (1–0)	Wofford (2–0)	Eastern Washington (1–1)	Sam Houston State (1–2)	Illinois State (5−0)	Sam Houston State (3–2)	Lehigh 3 (7–0)	James Madison (5–2)	Stony Brook 4 (8–1)	James Madison 1 (7–2)	Wofford (8–2)	Wofford (8–3)	Appalachian State (8–4)	9.
10.	Wofford	Wofford (1–0)	Eastern Washington (1–1)	The Citadel (3–0)	Georgia Southern (2–1)	Sam Houston State (2−2)	Lehigh (6–0)	Stony Brook 1 (6–1)	Stony Brook 1 (7–1)	James Madison (6–2)	New Hampshire 1 (8–2)	Central Arkansas (8–2)	Stony Brook (9–2)	Central Arkansas (9–3)	10.
11.	Montana	Appalachian State (0–1)	Georgia Southern (1–1)	Georgia Southern (1–1)	The Citadel (3–1)	Lehigh (5−0)	Stony Brook (5–1)	Illinois State (6–1)	Cal Poly 3 (7–0)	New Hampshire (7–2)	Northern Arizona 2 (8–1)	Illinois State (8–2)	New Hampshire (8–3)	Stony Brook (10–3)	11.
12.	Eastern Washington	Montana (1–0)	Towson (0–1)	Delaware (3–0)	Towson (2–1)	Towson (2−2)	New Hampshire (4–2)	New Hampshire (5–2)	New Hampshire (6–2)	Northern Arizona 2 (7–1)	Appalachian State (7–3)	Stony Brook (9–2)	Cal Poly (9–2)	Cal Poly (9–3)	12.
13.	Youngstown State 1	Towson (0–1)	Delaware (2–0)	Towson (1–1)	Illinois State (4–0)	Stony Brook (4−1)	Appalachian State (4–2)	Appalachian State (5–2)	Northern Arizona (6–1)	Central Arkansas (7–2)	Wofford (7–2)	James Madison (7–3)	Lehigh (10–1)	New Hampshire (8–4)	13.
14.	New Hampshire	New Hampshire (1–0)	Montana (1–1)	Montana (2–1)	Northern Iowa (1–3)	New Hampshire (3−2)	Illinois State (5–1)	Cal Poly 3 (6–0)	Central Arkansas (6–2)	Indiana State (7–2)	Central Arkansas (8–2)	Lehigh (9–1)	Villanova (8–3)	South Dakota State (9–4)	14.
15.	Delaware	Delaware (1–0)	Illinois State (2–0)	Illinois State (3–0)	Lehigh (4–0)	Appalachian State (3−2)	Cal Poly (5–0)	Youngstown State (4–2)	Indiana State (6–2)	Appalachian State (6–3)	Illinois State (8–2)	Northern Arizona (8–2)	Towson (7–4)	Villanova (8–4)	15.
16.	Lehigh	Lehigh (1–0)	Lehigh (2–0)	Lehigh (3–0)	Central Arkansas (3–1)	Delaware (4−1)	Northern Arizona (4–1)	Northern Arizona (5–1)	Appalachian State (5–3)	Cal Poly (7–1)	South Dakota State (7–2)	Villanova (7–3)	Illinois State (8–3)	Lehigh (10–1)	16.
17.	Stony Brook	Stony Brook (1–0)	Stony Brook (2–0)	Appalachian State (1–2)	Appalachian State (2–2)	Eastern Kentucky (4−1)	Towson (2–3)	Tennessee State (7–0)	Illinois State (6–2)	Illinois State (7–2)	Towson (5–4)	Cal Poly (8–2)	James Madison (7–4)	Towson (7–4)	17.
18.	Eastern Kentucky	Illinois State (1–0)	New Hampshire (1–1)	New Hampshire (2–1)	Stony Brook (3–1)	Northern Arizona (4−1)	Tennessee State (6–0)	Towson (3–3)	Eastern Kentucky (6–2)	Tennessee State (8–1)	Indiana State (7–3)	Indiana State (7–3)	Richmond (8–3)	Richmond (8–3)	18.
19.	Illinois State	Stephen F. Austin (1–0)	McNeese State (2–0)	McNeese State (3–0)	Eastern Kentucky (3–1)	The Citadel (3−2)	McNeese State (4–1)	Central Arkansas (5–2)	Villanova (6–2)	Towson (4–4)	Cal Poly (7–2)	Towson (6–4)	South Dakota State (8–3)	James Madison (7–4)	19.
20.	Stephen F. Austin	Maine (0–0)	Eastern Kentucky (1–1)	Stony Brook (2–1)	New Hampshire (2–2)	Cal Poly (4−0)	South Dakota State (4–1)	South Dakota State (5–1)	Delaware (5–2)	Albany (7–1)	Richmond (6–3)	Richmond (7–3)	Northern Arizona (8–3)	Northern Arizona (8–3)	20.
21.	Maine	Eastern Kentucky (0–1)	The Citadel (2–0)	Eastern Kentucky (2–1)	Montana (2–2)	McNeese State (4−1)	Central Arkansas (4–2)	Indiana State (5–2)	Tennessee State (7–1)	South Dakota State (6–2)	Villanova (6–3)	South Dakota State (7–3)	Eastern Kentucky (8–3)	Wagner (9–4)	21.
22.	Jacksonville State	McNeese State (1–0)	Indiana State (1–1)	Indiana State (2–1)	Northern Arizona (3–1)	Northern Iowa (1−4)	Harvard (4–0)	Harvard 1 95–0)	Youngstown State (4–3)	Richmond (5–3)	Eastern Kentucky (7–3)	Eastern Kentucky (8–3)	Bethune-Cookman (9–2)	Bethune-Cookman (9–3)	22.
23.	Indiana State	Indiana State (0–1)	Stephen F. Austin (1–1)	Maine (1–1)	Cal Poly (3–0)	South Dakota State (4−1)	Eastern Kentucky (4–2)	Eastern Kentucky (5–2)	Towson (3–4)	Delaware (5–3)	UT Martin (7–2)	Tennessee State (8–2)	Indiana State (7–4)	Eastern Kentucky (8–3)	23.
24.	Central Arkansas	Jacksonville State (0–1)	Jacksonville State (1–1)	Jacksonville State (1–1)	McNeese State (3–1)	Central Arkansas (3−2)	Delaware (4–2)	Villanova (5–2)	Albany (6–1)	Villanova (6–3)	Tennessee State (8–2)	Bethune-Cookman (8–2)	Colgate (8–3)	Coastal Carolina (8–4)	24.
25.	Harvard	Central Arkansas (0–1)	Maine (0–1)	Central Arkansas (2–1)	South Dakota State (3–1)	Harvard (3−0)	Samford (5–1)	Delaware (4–2)	Richmond (5–3)	Eastern Kentucky (6–3)	Harvard (8–1)	Eastern Illinois (7–3)	Eastern Illinois (7–4)	Colgate (8–4)	25.
	Preseason Aug 13	Week 1 Sept 3	Week 2 Sept 10	Week 3 Sept 17	Week 4 Sept 24	Week 5 Oct 1	Week 6 Oct 8	Week 7 Oct 15	Week 8 Oct 22	Week 9 Oct 29	Week 10 Nov 5	Week 11 Nov 12	Week 12 Nov 19	Week 13 (Final)	
		Dropped: 25 Harvard	Dropped: 25 Central Arkansas	Dropped: 23 Stephen F. Austin	Dropped: 22 Indiana State; 23 Maine; 24 Jacksonville State	Dropped: 21 Montana	Dropped: 19 The Citadel; 22 Northern Iowa	Dropped: 19 McNeese State; 25 Samford	Dropped: 20 South Dakota State; 22 Harvard	Dropped: 22 Youngstown State	Dropped: 20 Albany; 23 Delaware	Dropped: 23 UT Martin; 25 Harvard	Dropped: 23 Tennessee State	Dropped: 23 Indiana State; 25 Eastern Illinois	

== Coaches' Poll ==
	Preseason Aug 22	Week 1 Sept 3	Week 2 Sept 10	Week 3 Sept 17	Week 4 Sept 24	Week 5 Oct 1	Week 6 Oct 8	Week 7 Oct 15	Week 8 Oct 22	Week 9 Oct 29	Week 10 Nov 5	Week 11 Nov 12	Week 12 Nov 19	Week 13 (Final)	
1.	North Dakota State 19	North Dakota State 23 (1–0)	North Dakota State 24 (2–0)	North Dakota State 25 (2–0)	North Dakota State 25 (3–0)	North Dakota State 26 (4−0)	North Dakota State 26 (5−0)	Eastern Washington 11 (5–1)	Eastern Washington 22 (6–1)	Georgia Southern (7–1)	North Dakota State (8–1)	North Dakota State (9–1)	North Dakota State (10–1)	North Dakota State (14–1)	1.
2.	Sam Houston State 6	Sam Houston State 2 (0–0)	Sam Houston State 2 (1–0)	Montana State 1 (3–0)	Montana State 1 (4–0)	Montana State (5−0)	Montana State (6−0)	James Madison 7 (5–1)	Georgia Southern 1 (6–1)	North Dakota State (7–1)	Montana State (8–1)	Montana State (9–1)	Montana State (10–1)	Sam Houston State (11–4)	2.
3.	Georgia Southern 1	Georgia Southern (1–0)	Montana State (2–0)	Sam Houston State (1–1)	Youngstown State (4–0)	Youngstown State (4−0)	Old Dominion (5−0)	Georgia Southern 2 (5–1)	North Dakota State 3 (6–1)	Montana State (7–1)	Sam Houston State (7–2)	Sam Houston State (8–2)	Old Dominion	Georgia Southern (10–4)	3.
4.	Montana State	Montana State (1–0)	Old Dominion (2–0)	Youngstown State (3–0)	Old Dominion (4–0)	Old Dominion (5−0)	Wofford (5−0)	North Dakota State 4 (5–1)	Montana State (6–1)	Sam Houston State (6–2)	Old Dominion	Old Dominion	Eastern Washington	Eastern Washington	4.
5.	Appalachian State	Old Dominion (1–0)	James Madison (2–0)	Old Dominion (3–0)	Wofford (3–0)	Wofford (4−0)	James Madison (4−1)	Montana State 1 (6–1)	Sam Houston State (5–2)	Old Dominion	Lehigh	Eastern Washington	Sam Houston State (8–3)	Montana State (11–2)	5.
6.	Old Dominion	James Madison (1–0)	Northern Iowa (1–1)	Wofford (3–0)	James Madison (3–1)	James Madison (3−1)	Eastern Washington (4−1)	Sam Houston State 1 (4–2)	Lehigh (8–0)	Lehigh	Eastern Washington	Georgia Southern (8–2)	Appalachian State	Old Dominion	6.
7.	Northern Iowa	Northern Iowa (0–1)	Appalachian State (1–1)	James Madison (2–1)	Eastern Washington (2–1)	Eastern Washington (3−1)	Georgia Southern (4−1)	Lehigh (7–0)	Old Dominion (6–1)	Wofford	Georgia Southern (7–2)	New Hampshire	Georgia Southern (8–3)	Wofford	7.
8.	James Madison	Appalachian State (0–1)	Youngstown State (2–0)	Northern Iowa (1–2)	Delaware (4–0)	Georgia Southern (3−1)	Sam Houston State (3−2)	Old Dominion (5–1)	Wofford (6–1)	Eastern Washington	Stony Brook	Appalachian State	Central Arkansas	Appalachian State	8.
9.	Towson	Montana (1–0)	Wofford (2–0)	Eastern Washington (1–1)	Georgia Southern (2–1)	Sam Houston State (2−2)	Youngstown State (4−1)	Wofford (5–1)	Stony Brook (7–1)	Stony Brook	James Madison	Wofford	Wofford	Illinois State	9.
10.	Montana	Youngstown State (1–0)	Georgia Southern (1–1)	Georgia Southern (1–1)	Sam Houston State (1–2)	Lehigh (5−0)	Lehigh (6−0)	Stony Brook (6–1)	James Madison (5–2)	James Madison	New Hampshire	Central Arkansas	Lehigh	Central Arkansas	10.
11.	Lehigh	Eastern Washington (1–0)	Eastern Washington (1–1)	Montana (2–1)	Lehigh (4–0)	Illinois State (5−0)	Stony Brook (5−1)	Appalachian State (5–2)	Cal Poly (7–0)	New Hampshire	Northern Arizona	Illinois State	Stony Brook	Cal Poly	11.
12.	New Hampshire	New Hampshire (1–0)	Montana (1–1)	Delaware (3–0)	Illinois State (4–0)	Towson (2−2)	Appalachian State (4−2)	Cal Poly (6–0)	New Hampshire (6–2)	Northern Arizona	Appalachian State	Lehigh	Cal Poly	Stony Brook	12.
13.	Wofford	Wofford (1–0)	Lehigh (2–0)	Lehigh (3–0)	Towson (2–1)	Stony Brook (4−1)	New Hampshire (4−2)	Illinois State (6–1)	Northern Arizona (6–1)	Central Arkansas	Central Arkansas	Stony Brook	New Hampshire	New Hampshire	13.
14.	Delaware	Lehigh (1–0)	Delaware (2–0)	The Citadel (3–0)	Central Arkansas (3–1)	Appalachian State (3−2)	Cal Poly (5−0)	New Hampshire (5–2)	Central Arkansas (6–2)	Appalachian State	Wofford	James Madison	Towson	Lehigh	14.
15.	Eastern Washington	Delaware (1–0)	Towson (0–1)	Illinois State (3–0)	The Citadel (3–1)	Delaware (4−1)	McNeese State (4−1)	Northern Arizona (5–1)	Appalachian State (5–3)	Illinois State	Illinois State	Northern Arizona	Illinois State	Towson	15.
16.	Maine	Towson (0–1)	Stony Brook (2–0)	Towson (1–1)	Appalachian State (2–2)	Eastern Kentucky (4−1)	Illinois State (5−1)	Youngstown State (4–2)	Delaware (5–2)	Cal Poly	Harvard	Towson	Eastern Kentucky	Villanova	16.
17.	Stony Brook	Stony Brook (1–0)	Illinois State (2–0)	McNeese State (3–0)	Northern Iowa (1–3)	New Hampshire (3−2)	Central Arkansas (4−2)	Central Arkansas (5–2)	Illinois State (6–2)	Indiana State	Towson	Eastern Kentucky	Richmond	South Dakota State	17.
18.	Youngstown State	Maine (0–0)	New Hampshire (1–1)	Appalachian State (1–2)	Stony Brook (3–1)	McNeese State (4−1)	Northern Arizona (4−1)	Tennessee State (7–0)	Eastern Kentucky (6–2) т	Albany	Eastern Kentucky	Cal Poly	Villanova	Richmond	18.
19.	Central Arkansas	Illinois State (1–0)	McNeese State (2–0)	New Hampshire (2–1)	Eastern Kentucky (3–1)	Cal Poly (4−0)	Towson (2−3)	Towson (3–3)	Indiana State (6–2) т	Tennessee State	Cal Poly	Indiana State	Northern Arizona	Eastern Kentucky	19.
20.	Illinois State	Central Arkansas (0–1)	Central Arkansas (1–1)	Stony Brook (2–1)	Montana (2–2)	Central Arkansas (3−2)	Tennessee State (6−0)	Harvard (5–0)	Albany (6–1)	Delaware	South Dakota State	Richmond	James Madison	Northern Arizona	20.
21.	Eastern Kentucky	McNeese State 1 (1–0) т	Maine (1–1)	Central Arkansas (2–1)	McNeese State (3–1)	Northern Arizona (4−1)	Harvard (4−0)	McNeese State (4–2)	Tennessee State (7–1) т	Harvard	Indiana State	Villanova	South Dakota State	James Madison	21.
22.	Harvard	Stephen F. Austin (1–0) т	Norfolk State (2–0)	Maine (2–1)	New Hampshire (2–2)	The Citadel (3−2)	Delaware (4−2)	Delaware (4–2) т	Youngstown State (4–3) т	Towson	Bethune–Cookman	Bethune–Cookman	Bethune–Cookman	Wagner	22.
23.	Norfolk State	Harvard (0–0)	The Citadel (2–0)	Eastern Kentucky (2–1)	Cal Poly (3–0)	Harvard (3−0)	Eastern Kentucky (4−2)	Albany (6–1) т	Villanova (6–2)	Eastern Kentucky	Richmond	South Dakota State	Harvard	Bethune-Cookman	23.
24.	Stephen F. Austin	Norfolk State (1–0)	Harvard (0–0)	Harvard (1–0)	Harvard (2–0)	Tennessee State (5−0)	Albany (5−1)	Eastern Kentucky (5–2)	Harvard (5–1)	Bethune–Cookman	UT Martin	Harvard	Indiana State	Coastal Carolina	24.
25.	Indiana State	Eastern Kentucky (0–1)	Eastern Kentucky (1–1)	Indiana State (2–1)	Samford (4–0)	Northern Iowa (1−4)	Alabama A&M (6−0)	Indiana State (5–2)	Towson (3–4)	South Dakota State	Villanova	Eastern Illinois	Colgate	Eastern Illinois	25.
	Preseason Aug 22	Week 1 Sept 3	Week 2 Sept 10	Week 3 Sept 17	Week 4 Sept 24	Week 5 Oct 1	Week 6 Oct 8	Week 7 Oct 15	Week 8 Oct 22	Week 9 Oct 29	Week 10 Nov 5	Week 11 Nov 12	Week 12 Nov 19	Week 13 (Final)	
		Dropped: 25 Indiana State	Dropped: 21 Stephen F. Austin	Dropped: 22 Norfolk State	Dropped: 22 Maine; 25 Indiana State	Dropped: 20 Montana; 25 Samford	Dropped: 22 The Citadel; 25 Northern Iowa	Dropped: 25 Alabama A&M	Dropped: 21 McNeese State	Dropped: 21 Youngstown State; 23 Villanova	Dropped: 18 Albany; 19 Tennessee State; 20 Delaware	Dropped: 24 UT Martin	Dropped: 25 Eastern Illinois	Dropped: 23 Harvard; 24 Indiana State; 25 Colgate	
