= James Madison Dukes football statistical leaders =

The James Madison Dukes football statistical leaders are individual statistical leaders of the James Madison Dukes football program in various categories, including passing, rushing, receiving, total offense, defensive stats, and kicking. Within those areas, the lists identify single-game, single-season, and career leaders. The Dukes represent James Madison University (JMU) in the NCAA Division I FBS Sun Belt Conference (SBC).

James Madison began competing in intercollegiate football in 1972, when the school was known as Madison College. Coincidentally, that was first season of the modern era in which freshmen were allowed to play varsity football. The Dukes have played at all four levels of NCAA competition. They played their first season in the NCAA College Division, historic predecessor to NCAA Division II. When the College Division was split into Divisions II and III after that season, the Dukes joined Division III, playing there until 1975. After a single season in Division II in 1976, and the university's adoption of its current name in 1977, the Dukes returned to Division III, playing there from 1977–1979. In 1980, they moved to Division I-AA, now known as Division I FCS, and played at that level until moving to FBS in 2022.

These lists of statistical leaders are dominated by more recent players for several reasons:

- Since 1972, JMU's regular seasons have increased from 9 games to 10, 11, and most recently 12 games in length. During its FCS tenure, the regular season was normally 11 games, Two aspects of the FCS season have allowed teams at that level more games.
  - Pre-2026 NCAA rules allowed FCS teams to schedule 12 regular-season games in years when the period starting with the Thursday before Labor Day and ending with the final Saturday in November contains 14 Saturdays.
  - The NCAA organizes an FCS championship tournament, currently called the NCAA Division I Football Championship. However, it did not include I-AA/FCS playoff games toward official season statistics until the 2002 season. From that time through their final FCS season in 2021, the Dukes reached the playoffs 13 times, giving many recent players extra games to accumulate statistics.
- Since moving to FBS, JMU has played in two bowl games and a first-round College Football Playoff game, giving players in those seasons another game to accumulate statistics.
- The SBC has played a championship game since 2018, giving players on qualifying teams yet another game to amass statistics. JMU hosted (and won) the game in 2025.
- Due to COVID-19 issues, the NCAA ruled that the 2020 season would not count against the athletic eligibility of any football player, giving everyone who played in that season the opportunity for five years of eligibility instead of the normal four. Notably, this allowed Ethan Ratke to set an all-divisions NCAA record for career field goals, with 101 from 2017–2021.
- Since 2018, players in both FCS and FBS have been allowed to participate in as many as four games in a redshirt season; previously, playing in even one game "burned" the redshirt. Since 2024, postseason games have not counted against the four-game limit. These changes to redshirt rules have given very recent players several extra games to accumulate statistics.

These lists are updated through the end of the 2025 season.

== Passing ==
=== Passing yards ===
Career
Rk	Player	Yards	Years
1	Bryan Schor	7,078	2014 2015 2016 2017
2	Cole Johnson	6,511	2016 2017 2018 2019 2020 2021
3	Mike Cawley	6,482	1993 1994 1995
4	Justin Rascati	5,912	2004 2005 2006
5	Ben DiNucci	5,716	2018 2019
6	Vad Lee	5,652	2014 2015
7	Alonza Barnett III	5,433	2022 2023 2024 2025
8	Eriq Williams	5,356	1989 1990 1991 1992
9	Greg Maddox	4,863	1996 1997 1998
10	Matt LeZotte	4,504	2001 2002 2003 2004

Single season
Rk	Player	Yards	Year
1	Cole Johnson	3,779	2021
2	Jordan McCloud	3,657	2023
3	Vad Lee	3,462	2014
4	Ben DiNucci	3,441	2019
5	Bryan Schor	3,222	2017
6	Bryan Schor	3,002	2016
7	Michael Birdsong	2,813	2013
8	Alonza Barnett III	2,806	2025
9	Todd Centeio	2,697	2022
10	Alonza Barnett III	2,598	2024

Single game
Rk	Player	Yards	Year	Opponent
1	Todd Centeio	468	2022	Georgia Southern
2	Jordan McCloud	457	2023	Connecticut
3	Vad Lee	433	2014	Richmond
4	Vad Lee	406	2014	Villanova
5	Cole Johnson	398	2018	New Hampshire
6	Todd Centeio	394	2022	Arkansas State
7	Greg Maddox	388	1998	Hofstra
	Alonza Barnett III	388	2024	North Carolina
9	Cole Johnson	379	2021	Maine
10	Matt LeZotte	376	2001	Villanova

=== Passing touchdowns ===
Career
Rk	Player	TDs	Years
1	Bryan Schor	62	2014 2015 2016 2017
2	Cole Johnson	58	2016 2017 2018 2019 2020 2021
3	Vad Lee	51	2014 2015
	Justin Rascati	51	2004 2005 2006
5	Alonza Barnett III	49	2022 2023 2024 2025
6	Ben DiNucci	45	2018 2019
7	Mike Cawley	42	1993 1994 1995
8	Eriq Williams	40	1989 1990 1991 1992
9	Rodney Landers	35	2005 2006 2007 2008
	Jordan McCloud	35	2023
10	Greg Maddox	34	1996 1997 1998

Single season
Rk	Player	TDs	Year
1	Cole Johnson	41	2021
2	Jordan McCloud	35	2023
3	Vad Lee	30	2014
4	Ben DiNucci	29	2019
	Bryan Schor	29	2016
6	Bryan Schor	26	2017
	Alonza Barnett III	26	2024
8	Todd Centeio	25	2022
9	Alonza Barnett III	23	2025
10	Michael Birdsong	22	2013

Single game
Rk	Player	TDs	Year	Opponent
1	Cole Johnson	6	2021	Towson
	Cole Johnson	6	2021	Elon
	Todd Centeio	6	2022	Middle Tennessee
4	Michael Birdsong	5	2013	Stony Brook
	Vad Lee	5	2015	Towson
	Bryan Schor	5	2016	Rhode Island
	Bryan Schor	5	2016	New Hampshire
	Bryan Schor	5	2017	ETSU
	Cole Johnson	5	2021	Southeastern Louisiana
	Cole Johnson	5	2021	Morehead State
	Jordan McCloud	5	2023	Coastal Carolina
	Alonza Barnett III	5	2024	North Carolina
	Alonza Barnett III	5	2024	Ball State

== Rushing ==
=== Rushing yards ===
Career
Rk	Player	Yards	Years
1	Warren Marshall	4,168	1982 1983 1984 1985 1986
2	Khalid Abdullah	3,678	2013 2014 2015 2016
3	Percy Agyei-Obese	3,503	2018 2019 2020 2021 2022
4	Rodney Landers	3,477	2005 2006 2007 2008
5	Dae'Quan Scott	3,332	2009 2010 2011 2012 2013
6	Curtis Keaton	2,783	1998 1999
7	Cardon Johnson	2,745	2015 2016 2017 2018
8	Alvin Banks	2,694	2003 2004 2005 2006
9	Kenny Sims	2,665	1989 1990 1991 1992
10	Maurice Fenner	2,534	2003 2004 2005 2006

Single season
Rk	Player	Yards	Year
1	Khalid Abdullah	1,809	2016
2	Rodney Landers	1,770	2008
3	Curtis Keaton	1,719	1999
4	Wayne Knight	1,373	2025
5	Dae'Quan Scott	1,304	2011
6	Warren Marshall	1,284	1986
7	Rodney Landers	1,273	2007
8	Percy Agyei-Obese	1,216	2019
9	Kenny Sims	1,199	1991
10	Warren Marshall	1,181	1985

Single game
Rk	Player	Yards	Year	Opponent
1	Vad Lee	276	2015	SMU
2	Cardon Johnson	265	2017	ECU
3	Warren Marshall	264	1986	William & Mary
4	Dae'Quan Scott	251	2011	UMass
5	Warren Marshall	247	1984	Liberty
6	Curtis Keaton	241	1998	Villanova
7	Kelvin Jeter	240	1994	Troy State
8	Curtis Keaton	237	1999	Connecticut
9	Ron Stith	216	1976	California (Pa.)
10	Jordan Anderson	213	2011	Maine

=== Rushing touchdowns ===
Career
Rk	Player	TDs	Years
1	Khalid Abdullah	41	2013 2014 2015 2016
2	Percy Agyei-Obese	39	2018 2019 2020 2021 2022
3	Dae'Quan Scott	32	2009 2010 2011 2012 2013
	Eriq Williams	32	1989 1990 1991 1992
5	Rodney Landers	31	2005 2006 2007 2008
6	Curtis Keaton	30	1998 1999
7	Maurice Fenner	29	2003 2004 2005 2006
	Warren Marshall	29	1982 1983 1984 1985 1986
9	Alvin Banks	28	2003 2004 2005 2006
10	Cardon Johnson	26	2015 2016 2017 2018

Single season
Rk	Player	TDs	Year
1	Khalid Abdullah	22	2016
2	Curtis Keaton	20	1999
3	Percy Agyei-Obese	19	2019
4	Rodney Landers	16	2008
5	Alonza Barnett III	15	2025
6	Kenny Sims	14	1992
7	Khalid Abdullah	13	2015
8	Dae'Quan Scott	12	2011
	Rodney Landers	12	2007
	Mike Cawley	12	1994

Single game
Rk	Player	TDs	Year	Opponent
1	Kelvin Jeter	5	1995	Morgan State
	Curtis Keaton	5	1999	Connecticut
3	Mike Cawley	4	1994	Connecticut
	Alonza Barnett III	4	2025	Old Dominion

== Receiving ==
=== Receptions ===
Career
Rk	Player	Rec	Years
1	Earnest Payton	185	1997 1998 1999 2000
2	Riley Stapleton	169	2016 2017 2018 2019
3	Kris Thornton	168	2020 2021 2022
4	Brandon Ravenel	160	2013 2014 2015 2016
5	David McLeod	158	1990 1991 1992 1993
6	Gary Clark	155	1980 1981 1982 1983
7	Jay Jones	151	1993 1994 1995 1996
8	Alan Harrison	123	2000 2001 2002 2003
9	Macey Brooks	118	1993 1994 1995 1996
10	Antwane Wells Jr.	116	2020 2021

Single season
Rk	Player	Rec	Year
1	Antwane Wells Jr.	83	2021
	Kris Thornton	83	2021
3	Earnest Payton	82	1998
	Elijah Sarratt	82	2023
5	Brandon Polk	74	2019
6	Riley Stapleton	65	2019
7	David McLeod	64	1993
8	Jay Jones	63	1996
9	Riley Stapleton	62	2018
10	Kris Thornton	59	2022

Single game
Rk	Player	Rec	Year	Opponent
1	Earnest Payton	13	1998	UMass
	Earnest Payton	13	1998	Rhode Island
	Elijah Sarratt	13	2023	Connecticut
4	Kris Thornton	12	2021	New Hampshire
	Kris Thornton	12	2022	Middle Tennessee
6	Phoenix Sproles	11	2023	Coastal Carolina
	D.D. Boxley	11	2004	Maine
8	7 times by 6 players	10	Most recent: Riley Stapleton, 2019 vs. North Dakota State	

=== Receiving yards ===
Career
Rk	Player	Yards	Years
1	David McLeod	2,899	1990 1991 1992 1993
2	Gary Clark	2,863	1980 1981 1982 1983
3	Earnest Payton	2,807	1997 1998 1999 2000
4	Kris Thornton	2,540	2020 2021 2022
5	Brandon Ravenel	2,250	2013 2014 2015 2016
6	Riley Stapleton	2,113	2016 2017 2018 2019
7	Macey Brooks	2,014	1993 1994 1995 1996
8	Alan Harrison	1,907	2000 2001 2002 2003
9	Jay Jones	1,862	1993 1994 1995 1996
10	Antwane Wells Jr.	1,853	2020 2021

Single season
Rk	Player	Yards	Year
1	Antwane Wells Jr.	1,250	2021
2	David McLeod	1,207	1993
3	Elijah Sarratt	1,191	2023
4	Brandon Polk	1,179	2019
5	Kris Thornton	1,097	2021
6	Reggie Brown	1,054	2023
7	Kris Thornton	1,015	2022
8	Gary Clark	958	1982
9	David McLeod	933	1992
10	Earnest Payton	921	1998

Single game
Rk	Player	Yards	Year	Opponent
1	Reggie Brown	202	2023	Connecticut
2	David McLeod	192	1993	Villanova
3	Riley Stapleton	189	2017	Weber State
4	David McLeod	187	1993	New Hampshire
5	David McLeod	185	1992	Youngstown State
	Gary Clark	185	1983	Delaware State
7	David McLeod	184	1993	Boston University
8	Gary Clark	182	1981	William & Mary
9	Earnest Payton	181	2000	Lock Haven
10	Antwane Wells Jr.	179	2021	Maine

=== Receiving touchdowns ===
Career
Rk	Player	TDs	Years
1	Macey Brooks	25	1993 1994 1995 1996
	Kris Thornton	23	2020 2021 2022
3	Riley Stapleton	22	2016 2017 2018 2019
4	David McLeod	21	1990 1991 1992 1993
	Antwane Wells Jr.	21	2020 2021
6	Daniel Brown	17	2011 2012 2013 2014
7	Gary Clark	16	1980 1981 1982 1983
	Reggie Brown	16	2019 2020 2021 2022 2023
9	Brandon Ravenel	15	2013 2014 2015 2016
10	Mike Caussin	14	2006 2007 2008 2009
	Alan Harrison	14	2000 2001 2002 2003
	Jay Jones	14	1993 1994 1995 1996

Single season
Rk	Player	TDs	Year
1	Antwane Wells Jr.	15	2021
2	Macey Brooks	14	1996
3	Kris Thornton	13	2021
4	Brandon Polk	11	2019
5	Riley Stapleton	10	2019
	Reggie Brown	9	2023
7	DeAndre' Smith	8	2014
	Daniel Brown	8	2013
	L.C. Baker	8	2006
	David McLeod	8	1991
	Elijah Sarratt	8	2023

Single game
Rk	Player	TDs	Year	Opponent
1	Kris Thornton	4	2021	Campbell
2	Gary Clark	3	1981	C.W. Post
	Gary Clark	3	1983	Liberty
	Macey Brooks	3	1996	McNeese State
	Macey Brooks	3	1996	Boston University
	Daniel Brown	3	2013	Albany
	Daniel Schiele	3	2016	Rhode Island
	Antwane Wells Jr.	3	2021	Southeastern Louisiana
	Antwane Wells Jr.	3	2021	Towson
	Kris Thornton	3	2022	Middle Tennessee
	Elijah Sarratt	3	2023	Coastal Carolina
	Landon Ellis	3	2025	Louisiana

== Total offense ==
Total offense is the sum of passing and rushing statistics. It does not include receiving or returns.

Unlike most FBS programs, James Madison does not publish a leaderboard for "touchdowns responsible for", defined as combined passing and rushing touchdowns, over any time frame (career, season, single-game).

=== Total offense yards ===
Career
Rk	Player	Yards	Years
1	Bryan Schor	8,241	2014 2015 2016 2017
2	Eriq Williams	7,678	1989 1990 1991 1992
3	Vad Lee	7,292	2014 2015
4	Mike Cawley	7,249	1993 1994 1995
5	Justin Rascati	7,111	2004 2005 2006
6	Cole Johnson	6,976	2016 2017 2018 2019 2020 2021
7	Rodney Landers	6,765	2005 2006 2007 2008
8	Ben DiNucci	6,718	2018 2019
9	Alonza Barnett III	6,508	2022 2023 2024 2025
10	Justin Thorpe	5,412	2008 2009 2010 2011 2012

Single season
Rk	Player	Yards	Year
1	Vad Lee	4,288	2014
2	Cole Johnson	4,050	2021
3	Ben DiNucci	4,010	2019
4	Jordan McCloud	3,933	2023
5	Bryan Schor	3,571	2016
6	Bryan Schor	3,544	2017
7	Alonza Barnett III	3,395	2025
8	Rodney Landers	3,304	2008
9	Todd Centeio	3,090	2022
10	Alonza Barnett III	3,040	2024

Single game
Rk	Player	Yards	Year	Opponent
1	Vad Lee	565	2015	SMU
2	Todd Centeio	512	2022	Georgia Southern
3	Alonza Barnett III	487	2024	North Carolina
4	Vad Lee	478	2014	Villanova
5	Vad Lee	455	2014	Richmond
6	Jordan McCloud	453	2023	Connecticut
7	Alonza Barnett III	448	2025	Old Dominion
8	Vad Lee	418	2015	Richmond
9	Jordan McCloud	411	2023	Georgia State
10	Rodney Landers	408	2007	Rhode Island

== Defense ==
=== Interceptions ===
Career
Rk	Player	Ints	Years
1	Jimmy Moreland	18	2014 2015 2016 2017 2018
2	Raven Greene	14	2013 2014 2015 2016 2017
3	Rashad Robinson	13	2015 2016 2017 2018 2019
	Jordan Brown	13	2014 2015 2016 2017
	Clint Kent	13	2002 2003 2004 2005
	Bob Logan	13	1975 1976 1977 1978
7	Dean Marlowe	12	2011 2012 2013 2014
8	Taylor Reynolds	11	2013 2014 2015 2016
	John Stein	11	1993 1994 1995 1996
	Mike Thurman	11	1978 1979 1980 1981 1982

Single season
Rk	Player	Ints	Year
1	Jordan Brown	9	2017
2	Jimmy Moreland	8	2017
	Tony Booth	8	1997
4	Rashad Robinson	7	2017
	Terry Hansrote	7	1977
	Bob Logan	7	1976
7	Adam Smith	6	2019
	Raven Greene	6	2016
	Quincy Waller	6	1995
	Chris Parrott	6	1992
	Brent Good	6	1974

Single game
Rk	Player	Ints	Year	Opponent
1	Jimmy Moreland	3	2017	South Dakota State
	Chris Jacobs	3	1985	Georgia Southern
	Bob Logan	3	1976	Emory & Henry

=== Tackles ===
Career
Rk	Player	Tackles	Years
1	Charles Haley	506	1982 1983 1984 1985
2	Clyde Hoy	503	1978 1979 1980 1981
3	Dale Caparaso	487	1976 1978 1979
4	Stephon Robertson	445	2010 2011 2012 2013
5	Woody Bergeria	438	1974 1975 1976 1977
6	Dean McCullough	427	1983 1984 1985 1986
7	Tony LeZotte	416	2004 2005 2006 2007
8	Derick Pack	399	1999 2000 2001
9	Eupton Jackson	362	1987 1988 1989 1990
10	Gage Steele	354	2013 2014 2015 2016

Single season
Rk	Player	Tackles	Year
1	Clyde Hoy	167	1981
2	Dale Caparaso	166	1978
	Dale Caparaso	166	1976
4	Dennard Melton	161	2003
5	Derrick Lloyd	157	2001
6	Derick Pack	156	2000
7	Dale Caparaso	155	1979
8	Dean McCullough	151	1986
9	Dewey Windham	148	1975

Single game
Rk	Player	Tackles	Year	Opponent
1	Clyde Hoy	26	1981	Towson
	Clyde Hoy	26	1980	U.S. Merchant
3	Dean McCullough	25	1986	Massachusetts
	Dale Caparaso	25	1976	Davidson
5	Clyde Hoy	24	1981	Furman
6	Derrick Lloyd	23	2001	Rhode Island
	Marty Fitzgerald	23	1987	Massachusetts

=== Sacks ===
Career
Rk	Player	Sacks	Years
1	Chris Morant	33.0	1998 1999 2000
2	Arthur Moats	29.0	2006 2007 2008 2009
3	Woody Bergeria	28.0	1974 1975 1976 1977
4	John Daka	27.5	2016 2017 2018 2019
5	Andrew Ankrah	26.0	2014 2015 2016 2017
6	Sage Harold	25.5	2011 2012 2013 2014
7	Larry Smith	25.0	1975 1976 1977 1978
8	Kevin Winston	24.5	2003 2004 2005 2006
9	Ron'Dell Carter	23.5	2017 2018 2019
10	Mark Baird	21.0	1974 1975 1976 1977
	Bob Dunn	21.0	1974 1975 1976

Single season
Rk	Player	Sacks	Year
1	John Daka	16.5	2019
2	Jalen Green	15.5	2023
3	Sage Harold	13.5	2014
4	Eric O'Neill	13.0	2024
5	Ron'Dell Carter	12.0	2019
	Chris Morant	12.0	1999
7	Arthur Moats	11.5	2008
	Richard Hicks	11.5	2002
9	Arthur Moats	11.0	2009
	Kevin Winston	11.0	2006
	Chris Morant	11.0	1998
	Larry Smith	11.0	1977

== Kicking ==
=== Field goals made ===
Career
Rk	Player	FGs	Years
1	Ethan Ratke	101	2017 2018 2019 2020 2021
2	John Coursey	39	1993 1994 1995 1996
3	Cameron Starke	37	2010 2011 2012 2013
4	David Rabil	32	2003 2004 2005 2006
	Scott Norwood	32	1978 1979 1980 1981
6	Mickey Stinnett	30	1982 1983 1984
7	Tyler Gray	29	2015 2016 2017 2018
8	Camden Wise	27	2018 2019 2021 2022 2023
9	Dave Stannard	23	2007 2008
	Burke George	23	2001 2002 2003

Single season
Rk	Player	FGs	Year
1	Ethan Ratke	29	2021
2	Ethan Ratke	27	2019
3	Ethan Ratke	17	2018
4	Camden Wise	16	2023
	Noe Ruelas	16	2024
6	Cameron Starke	15	2011
	John Coursey	15	1994
	Scott Norwood	15	1980
9	Ethan Ratke	14	2017
	Tyler Gray	14	2016
	Mike Glover	14	1999
	John Coursey	14	1995
	Ethan Ratke	14	2020
	Morgan Suarez	14	2025

Single game
Rk	Player	FGs	Year	Opponent
1	Ethan Ratke	6	2021	William & Mary
2	Ethan Ratke	5	2021	Delaware
3	Ethan Ratke	4	2018	Elon
	Ethan Ratke	4	2021	Richmond
	Morgan Suarez	4	2026	Old Dominion
	Morgan Suarez	4	2026	Southern Miss
7	28 times by 12 players	3	Most recent: Morgan Suarez, 2025 vs. Coastal Carolina	
