= List of James Madison University alumni =

The following is a list of James Madison University alumni.

== Athletics ==
=== American football ===
- Khalid Abdullah, former professional football player
- John Allen, Tennessee Tech wide receiver coach
- Macey Brooks, former NFL player
- Daniel Brown, former NFL player
- D. J. Bryant, former NFL player
- Bryce Carter, professional football player for the Ottawa Redblacks
- Ron'Dell Carter, professional football player for the Michigan Panthers
- Mike Caussin, former NFL player
- Mike Cawley, former professional football player
- Gary Clark, former NFL player
- John Daka, professional football player
- Corey Davis, professional football player
- Rashard Davis, former NFL player
- John DeFilippo, professional football coach
- Ben DiNucci, former NFL player
- Willie Drew, professional football player for Toronto Argonauts
- DeLane Fitzgerald, head coach Southern Utah
- Liam Fornadel, NFL player for New York Jets
- Dion Foxx, former NFL player
- Nelson Garner, former NFL player
- Jalen Green, professional football player for Toronto Argonauts
- Raven Greene, former NFL player
- Charles Haley, former NFL player, Pro Football Hall of Fame and College Football Hall of Fame inductee
- Derek Hart, former NFL player
- Zach Horton, NFL player for Detroit Lions
- Quintin Hunter, head coach for Emory and Henry
- Ishmael Hyman, former NFL player
- Jay Jones, former NFL player
- Akeem Jordan, former NFL player
- Delvin Joyce, former NFL player
- Curtis Keaton, former NFL player
- Clint Kent, former professional football player
- Jamree Kromah, NFL player for Chicago Bears
- Rodney Landers, former professional football player
- Vad Lee, former professional football player
- Scott Lemn, head coach for Bridgewater college
- Dean Marlowe, Quality control coach for Oklahoma State football and former football player
- Evan McCollough, former professional football player
- Scotty McGee, former professional football player
- David McLeod, former professional football player and first recipient of AFL Defensive Player of the Year Award
- Douglas McNeil, professional football player
- Arthur Moats, former NFL player
- Jimmy Moreland, former NFL player
- Dylan Morris, Assistant running backs coach for Alabama
- Scott Norwood, former NFL player and NFL scoring leader (1988)
- Ed Perry, former NFL player
- Justin Rascati, pass game coordinator for Cincinnati Bengals
- Bryan Stinespring, head football coach for Roanoke College
- Aaron Stinnie, NFL player for New York Giants
- Isaac Ukwu, professional football player for Michigan Panthers
- Earl Watford, former NFL player
- Josh Wells, former NFL player
- Kelly Wiltshire, former professional player

=== Baseball ===
- Odicci Alexander, former softball player and Softball America Pitcher of the Year in 2021
- Dana Allison, former MLB player
- Lorenzo Bundy, former MLB player and Manager of the Diablos Rojos del México
- Rich Croushore, former MLB player
- Chase DeLauter, MLB outfielder for the Cleveland Guardians
- Travis Harper, former MLB player
- Kevin Kelly, MLB pitcher for the Tampa Bay Rays
- Kellen Kulbacki, former MLB player
- Jake Lowery, former MLB player
- Brian McNichol, former MLB player
- Dan Meyer, former MLB player
- Larry Mitchell, former MLB player
- Kevin Munson, former MLB player
- Ryan Reid, former MLB player
- Nick Robertson, baseball player
- Billy Sample, former MLB player and broadcaster
- Rich Thompson, former MLB player
- Mike Venafro, former MLB player

=== Basketball ===
- Denzel Bowles, former professional basketball player
- Kenny Brooks, head coach of the University of Kentucky women's basketball team
- Dwayne Broyles, former professional basketball player
- Charles Cooke, former NBA player (did not graduate)
- Ron Curry, professional basketball player
- Sherman Dillard, assistant basketball coach at the University of Iowa men's basketball
- Terrence Edwards Jr., professional basketball player
- Steve Hood, former professional basketball player
- Matt Lewis, professional basketball player
- Wes Miller, head coach of University of Cincinnati men's basketball (did not graduate)
- Louis Rowe, assistant coach Cleveland State men's basketball
- Dan Ruland, former professional basketball player
- Kevin Sutton, assistant coach Florida Gulf Coast University men's basketball
- Kyle Swanston, former professional basketball player
- Linton Townes (born 1959), former NBA player
- Tom Vodanovich, professional basketball player
- Kennard Winchester, former NBA player (did not graduate)
- Tamera Young, former WNBA player

=== Soccer ===
- Christina Julien, professional ice hockey player for Melbourne Ice and former soccer player, member of 2011 Canadian women's world cup team
- Alan Mayer, former professional soccer player, voted in 1999 the Top JMU Athlete of the Century
- Kurt Morsink, former MLS player
- C. J. Sapong, former MLS player and 2011 MLS Rookie of the Year
- Nick Zimmerman, head coach of Mississippi State women's soccer team and former MLS player

=== Other ===
- Jeff Compher, former director of athletics at East Carolina University
- Eric Davis, former rugby player
- Tiombe Hurd, USA Olympic track & field athlete (2004); American record holder in outdoor triple jump
- Elliott Sadler, NASCAR driver (did not graduate)

== Academics ==
- Marcia Angell, Harvard University Medical School faculty member
- Carole Baldwin, research zoologist
- Matt Bondurant, author of The Wettest County in the World; professor at the University of Texas at Dallas
- Kembrew McLeod, faculty member at the University of Iowa
- Marney White, Yale University faculty member

== Business ==
- Jason Harris, president and founder of Mekanism
- John-Paul Lee, founder and CEO of Tavalon Tea
- Jennifer Morgan, co-chief executive officer of SAP SE
- Christina Tosi, founder of Milk Bar
- Kathy J. Warden, CEO of Northrop Grumman

== Engineering ==
=== Software Engineering and Technology ===
Arquay Harris, software developer, vice-president of engineering at Webflow (2021-2022)

== Entertainment ==
- Sarah Baker, actress (The Campaign, Mascots)
- Steve Buckhantz, basketball play-by-play announcer for the Washington Wizards
- Brent Comer, actor
- Tony Deyo, comedian
- Glennon Doyle, author
- Meredith Garretson, actress
- Barbara Hall, TV producer and writer
- Ashley Iaconetti, television personality (The Bachelor)
- Steve James, documentary producer and director
- Mia LaBerge, artist
- Geoff LaTulippe, screenwriter
- Mark Jordan Legan, TV and film writer, NPR correspondent
- Mike Long, professional Magic: The Gathering player for the Pro Tour
- Karen McCullah Lutz, screenwriter
- Nathan Lyon, host of Discovery Health's television series A Lyon in the Kitchen
- Wendy Maybury, stand-up comedian
- PFT Commenter, blogger, podcast personality for Barstool Sports (Pardon My Take)
- Jon Pineda, author
- Don Rhymer, screenwriter and producer
- John Roberts, former NASCAR on Fox and NASCAR on Speed host
- Anne Savedge, photographer, artist
- Tony Schiavone, professional wrestling announcer
- Reshma Shetty, actress (Royal Pains)
- Patricia Southall, Miss Virginia USA; first runner-up Miss USA
- Chris Sprouse, comic book artist
- Phoef Sutton, film and television writer
- Sara Tomko, actress (Resident Alien)
- Christina Tosi, owner of Momofuku Milk Bar; MasterChef judge; James Beard Foundation Award winner: Rising Star Chef
- Nina Willner, nonfiction author

== Journalism ==
- Jim Acosta, senior White House correspondent for CNN
- Cornell Belcher, writer, pollster, and political strategist; regular contributor on NBC News, MSNBC, and NPR
- Julia Campbell, newspaper journalist and reporter for CourtTV
- Lindsay Czarniak, sports anchor and reporter for ESPN SportsCenter
- Lawrence Jackson, photojournalist
- Alison Parker, television reporter who, along with videographer Adam Ward, was killed during a live interview in 2015
- Chuck Taylor, music journalist

== Music ==
- Robert Abisi, DJ (Lost Kings)
- Brian Balmages, composer
- Margaret Becker, Christian rock musician
- The Bigger Lights, alternative rock band
- Ross Copperman, recording artist
- Tony Deyo, marching band drill designer
- Everything, '90s rock band
- Andrew Goldstein, music producer, songwriter
- Joe Hottinger, musician (Halestorm)
- Keith Howland, musician (Chicago)
- Illiterate Light, rock band
- Chris Monroe, musician
- Leroi Moore, musician (Dave Matthews Band)
- Soon Hee Newbold, producer, composer, musician
- Old Dominion, members Whit Sellers, Geoff Sprung, Brad Tursi, country musicians and songwriters
- Nate Smith, drummer, songwriter, producer
- Butch Taylor, musician (Dave Matthews Band)
- Phil Vassar, country music singer
- Andrew York, musician and composer

== Politics and government ==
- Dawn Adams, Virginia state delegate
- Maggie Ardiente, President of Humanists International
- Dickie Bell, former Virginia state delegate
- Melanie Blunt, First Lady of Missouri (2005–2009)
- Laurie Buckhout, acting Assistant Secretary of Defense for Cyber Policy (2025)
- Chris Collins, former Virginia state delegate
- Kirk Cox, former Speaker of the Virginia House of Delegates
- Sean F. Dalton, member of the New Jersey General Assembly
- Anita Friedt, diplomat and former U.S. Department of State senior official
- Emmett Hanger, Virginia state senator
- Tara Jackson, acting Prince George's County executive (2024–present)
- James A. "Jay" Leftwich, Jr., Virginia state delegate
- Ryan McDougle, Virginia state senator and former Virginia state delegate
- Jeff McKay, chairman of the Fairfax County, VA Board of Supervisors
- Jason Miyares, attorney general of Virginia
- Matt Rinaldi, former Texas state representative and chairman of the Republican Party of Texas
- Bettina Ring, former Virginia Secretary of Agriculture and Forestry
- Walter Shaub, former director of the United States Office of Government Ethics and senior director, Campaign Legal Center
- Joseph R. Slights III, vice-chancellor, Delaware Court of Chancery; Judge, Superior Court of Delaware
- Levar Stoney, mayor of Richmond, Virginia and former Secretary of the Commonwealth of Virginia
- Scott Surovell, Virginia state senator
- Matthew Wasniewski, Historian of the United States House of Representatives
- Liza Wright, served George W. Bush as assistant to president for presidential personnel and director of presidential personnel
