= List of James Madison Dukes football seasons =

This is a list of seasons completed by the James Madison Dukes football team of the National Collegiate Athletic Association (NCAA) Division I Football Bowl Subdivision, representing James Madison University in the East Division of the Sun Belt Conference. James Madison has played their home games at Bridgeforth Stadium (formerly Madison Stadium) in Harrisonburg, Virginia since 1975.

== Seasons ==
| National champions † | Conference champions * | Division champions ^ | Postseason Appearance/Bowl Berth ‡ |

| Season | Head coach | Conference affiliation | Season results | | | Playoff or bowl result | Final ranking |
| Season | Head coach | Conference affiliation | Conference finish | W-L-T record | Conference record | Playoff or bowl result | Final ranking |
|---|---|---|---|---|---|---|---|
Madison Dukes
| 1972 | Challace McMillin | Independent | | 0–4–1 | | | |
| 1973 | Challace McMillin | Independent | | 4–5 | | | |
| 1974 | Challace McMillin | Virginia Collegiate Athletic Association (VCAA) | 5th | 6–4 | 3–2 | | |
| 1975 | Challace McMillin | Virginia Collegiate Athletic Association (VCAA) | 1st | 9–0–1 | 5–0 | | |
| 1976 | Challace McMillin | DIII Independent | | 7–4 | | | |
James Madison Dukes
| 1977 | Challace McMillin | DIII Independent | | 5–5 | | | |
| 1978 | Challace McMillin | DIII Independent | | 8–2 | | | |
| 1979 | Challace McMillin | DII Independent | | 4–6 | | | |
James Madison moved to Division I-AA (1979–2005); Division I FCS (2006–2021)
| 1980 | Challace McMillin | DI-AA Independent | | 4–6 | | | |
| 1981 | Challace McMillin | DI-AA Independent | | 3–8 | | | |
| 1982 | Challace McMillin | DI-AA Independent | | 8–3 | | | |
| 1983 | Challace McMillin | DI-AA Independent | | 3–8 | | | |
| 1984 | Challace McMillin | DI-AA Independent | | 6–5 | | | |
| 1985 | Joe Purzycki | DI-AA Independent | | 5–6 | | | |
| 1986 | Joe Purzycki | DI-AA Independent | | 5–5–1 | | | |
| 1987 | Joe Purzycki | DI-AA Independent | | 9–3 | | Lost NCAA FCS First Round | #8 |
| 1988 | Joe Purzycki | DI-AA Independent | | 5–6 | | | |
| 1989 | Joe Purzycki | DI-AA Independent | | 5–4–1 | | | |
| 1990 | Joe Purzycki | DI-AA Independent | | 5–6 | | | |
| 1991 | Rip Scherer | DI-AA Independent | | 9–4 | | Lost NCAA FCS Quarterfinals | #16 |
| 1992 | Rip Scherer | DI-AA Independent | | 4–7 | | | |
| 1993 | Rip Scherer | Yankee | 3rd (Mid-Atlantic) | 6–5 | 4–4 | | |
| 1994 | Rip Scherer | Yankee | 1st (Mid-Atlantic) | 10–3 | 6–2 | Lost NCAA FCS Quarterfinals | #13 |
| 1995 | Alex Wood | Yankee | 2nd (Mid-Atlantic) | 8–4 | 6–2 | Lost NCAA FCS First Round | #13 |
| 1996 | Alex Wood | Yankee | 4th (Mid-Atlantic) | 7–4 | 5–3 | | #23 |
| 1997 | Alex Wood | Atlantic 10 (A-10) | 6th (Mid-Atlantic) | 5–6 | 3–5 | | |
| 1998 | Alex Wood | Atlantic 10 (A-10) | 6th (Mid-Atlantic) | 3–8 | 2–6 | | |
| 1999 | Mickey Matthews | Atlantic 10 (A-10) | T-1st | 8–4 | 7–1 | Lost NCAA FCS First Round | #13 |
| 2000 | Mickey Matthews | Atlantic 10 (A-10) | 4th | 6–5 | 4–4 | | |
| 2001 | Mickey Matthews | Atlantic 10 (A-10) | 11th | 2–9 | 0–9 | | |
| 2002 | Mickey Matthews | Atlantic 10 (A-10) | 9th | 5–7 | 3–6 | | |
| 2003 | Mickey Matthews | Atlantic 10 (A-10) | 7th | 6–6 | 4–5 | | |
| 2004 | Mickey Matthews | Atlantic 10 (A-10) | T-1st | 13–2 | 7–1 | Won NCAA Division I Championship | #1 |
| 2005 | Mickey Matthews | Atlantic 10 (A-10) | 2nd (South) | 7–4 | 5–3 | | #25 |
| 2006 | Mickey Matthews | Atlantic 10 (A-10) | 1st (South) | 9–3 | 7–1 | Lost NCAA FCS First Round | #9 |
| 2007 | Mickey Matthews | Colonial Athletic Association (CAA) | 2nd (South) | 8–4 | 6–2 | Lost NCAA FCS First Round | #12 |
| 2008 | Mickey Matthews | Colonial Athletic Association (CAA) | 1st | 12–2 | 8–0 | Lost NCAA FCS Semifinals | #3 |
| 2009 | Mickey Matthews | Colonial Athletic Association (CAA) | 5th (South) | 6–5 | 4–4 | | |
| 2010 | Mickey Matthews | Colonial Athletic Association (CAA) | 8th | 6–5 | 3–5 | | |
| 2011 | Mickey Matthews | Colonial Athletic Association (CAA) | 6th | 8–5 | 5–3 | Lost NCAA FCS Second Round | #15 |
| 2012 | Mickey Matthews | Colonial Athletic Association (CAA) | 6th | 7–4 | 5–3 | | |
| 2013 | Mickey Matthews | Colonial Athletic Association (CAA) | 8th | 6–6 | 3–5 | | |
| 2014 | Everett Withers | Colonial Athletic Association (CAA) | 3rd | 9–4 | 6–2 | Lost NCAA FCS First Round | #18 |
| 2015 | Everett Withers | Colonial Athletic Association (CAA) | T-1st | 9–3 | 6–2 | Lost NCAA FCS Second Round | #11 |
| 2016 | Mike Houston | Colonial Athletic Association (CAA) | 1st | 14–1 | 8–0 | Won NCAA Division I Championship | #1 |
| 2017 | Mike Houston | Colonial Athletic Association (CAA) | 1st | 14–1 | 8–0 | Lost NCAA FCS Championship | #2 |
| 2018 | Mike Houston | Colonial Athletic Association (CAA) | 2nd | 9–4 | 6–2 | Lost NCAA FCS Second Round | #9 |
| 2019 | Curt Cignetti | Colonial Athletic Association (CAA) | 1st | 14–2 | 8–0 | Lost NCAA FCS Championship | #2 |
| 2020 | Curt Cignetti | Colonial Athletic Association (CAA) | 1st (South) | 7–1 | 3–0 | Lost NCAA FCS Semifinals | #3 |
| 2021 | Curt Cignetti | Colonial Athletic Association (CAA) | T-1st | 12–2 | 7–1 | Lost NCAA FCS Semifinals | #3 |
James Madison moved to Division I FBS (2022–present)
| 2022 | Curt Cignetti | Sun Belt | T-1st (East) | 8–3 | 6–2 | Ineligible | |
| 2023 | Curt Cignetti | Sun Belt | 1st (East) | 11–2 | 7–1 | Lost Armed Forces Bowl | RV |
| 2024 | Bob Chesney | Sun Belt | 3rd (East) | 9–4 | 4–4 | Won Boca Raton Bowl | |
| 2025 | Bob Chesney | Sun Belt | 1st (East & CG) | 12–2 | 8–0 | Lost College Football Playoff first round | #19 |
