= Dudley Award =

College football award in Virginia, US

- Awarded for: The best college football player in the state of Virginia
- Location: Virginia
- Country: United States
- Presented by: The Richmond Times-Dispatch

History
- First award: 1990
- Most recent: Alonza Barnett III, QB, James Madison

The Dudley Award, named after former Virginia Cavaliers running back Bill Dudley, is presented annually by the Richmond Times-Dispatch to honor the top college football player in Virginia.

== Winners ==
Dudley Award winners
Year	Player	School	Position
1990	Shawn Moore	Virginia	QB
1991	Matt Blundin	Virginia	QB
1992	Cary Perkins	Emory & Henry	QB
1993	Jim Pyne	Virginia Tech	OL
1994	Mike Frederick	Virginia	DE
1995	Cornell Brown	Virginia Tech	DE
1996	Tiki Barber	Virginia	HB
1997	Anthony Poindexter	Virginia	S
1998	Marc Megna	Richmond	DT
1999	Corey Moore	Virginia Tech	DE
2000	Lee Suggs	Virginia Tech	RB
2001	Billy McMullen	Virginia	WR
2002	Lee Suggs	Virginia Tech	RB
2003	Kevin Jones	Virginia Tech	RB
2004	Bryan Randall	Virginia Tech	QB
2005	Darryl Tapp	Virginia Tech	DE
2006	Vince Hall	Virginia Tech	LB
2007	Chris Long	Virginia	DE
2008	Rodney Landers	James Madison	QB
2009	Cody Grimm	Virginia Tech	LB
2010	Tyrod Taylor	Virginia Tech	QB
2011	David Wilson	Virginia Tech	RB
2012	Taylor Heinicke	Old Dominion	QB
2013	Stephon Robertson	James Madison	LB
2014	Vad Lee	James Madison	QB
2015	Vad Lee	James Madison	QB
2016	Bryan Schor	James Madison	QB
2017	Micah Kiser	Virginia	LB
2018	Bryce Perkins	Virginia	QB
2019	Bryce Perkins	Virginia	QB
2020	Malik Willis	Liberty	QB
2021	Brennan Armstrong	Virginia	QB
2022	Reece Udinski	Richmond	QB
2023	Jalen Green	James Madison	DE
2024	Antwuan Powell-Ryland	Virginia Tech	DE
2025	Alonza Barnett III	James Madison	QB

== Trophies won by school ==
School	Won
Virginia Tech	13
Virginia	11
James Madison	7
Richmond	2
Emory & Henry	1
Liberty	1
Old Dominion	1

== Trophies won by position ==
School	Won
QB	16
DE	7
LB	4
RB	4
DT	1
HB	1
OL	1
S	1
WR	1
