= Alonza Barnett =

American football player (born 2003)

No. 14 – UCF Knights
- Position: Quarterback
- Class: Redshirt Senior

Personal information
- Born: June 3, 2003 (age 23)
- Listed height: 5 ft 11 in (1.80 m)
- Listed weight: 210 lb (95 kg)

Career information
- High school: Grimsley (Greensboro, North Carolina)
- College: James Madison (2022–2025); UCF (2026–present)

Awards and highlights
- Sun Belt Player of the Year (2025); Dudley Award (2025); First-team All-Sun Belt (2025)
- Stats at ESPN

Alonza Barnett III (born June 3, 2003) is an American college football quarterback for the UCF Knights. He previously played for the James Madison Dukes.

== Early life ==
Barnett attended Grimsley High School in Greensboro, North Carolina. Coming out of high school, he was rated as a three-star recruit, where he committed to play college football for the James Madison Dukes under head coach Curt Cignetti.

== College career ==
=== James Madison ===
Under head coach Curt Cignetti, he began the 2022 season as the third-string quarterback behind Todd Centeio and Billy Atkins. He made his collegiate debut in Week 2 against Norfolk State in a victory. On the season, he appeared in two games while retaining his redshirt. He completed his only pass attempt for 14 yards and added 15 rushing yards.

In 2023, he won the starting quarterback competition over Arizona transfer Jordan McCloud. He made his first collegiate start in the season opener against Bucknell, leading James Madison to a victory while scoring his first collegiate touchdown on a rushing touchdown in the first half. After completing 3 of 11 passes for 15 yards and an interception, he was benched in the third quarter in favor of McCloud. He appeared in one additional game that season against Troy, where he did not record any statistics.

In 2024, McCloud transferred to Texas State, opening an opportunity for Barnett to compete for the starting quarterback role entering his third season. Following head coach Cignetti's departure for Indiana, new head coach Bob Chesney named him the starter. In the season opener against Charlotte, he threw for 219 yards and two touchdowns while adding 89 rushing yards in a victory. The win began a four-game winning streak to start the season, including victories over North Carolina and Ball State. Against North Carolina, he delivered a career-best performance, completing 22 of 34 passes for 388 yards and five touchdowns while adding 99 rushing yards and two touchdowns in a 70–50 upset victory. He became the first player in Sun Belt Conference history to record five passing touchdowns and two rushing touchdowns in the same game, while also setting the James Madison single-game record for total touchdowns. He followed the performance with 280 passing yards and five touchdowns, along with 44 rushing yards and a rushing touchdown, in a 63–7 win over Ball State. On the season, he led the Dukes to an 8–4 record and a bowl game appearance, but missed the 2024 Boca Raton Bowl due to injury. On the season, he started 12 games and completed 213 of 355 passes for 2,598 yards, 26 touchdowns, and four interceptions while adding 442 rushing yards and seven rushing touchdowns.

Barnett returned as the starting quarterback for the 2025 season. He led James Madison to an 11–1 regular season record, including a ten-game winning streak to close the regular season. In the Sun Belt Conference Championship Game, he led the Dukes to a 31–14 victory over Troy, completing 10 of 25 passes for 93 yards, one touchdown, and one interception while adding 85 rushing yards and a touchdown. The victory clinched the Dukes' first-ever College Football Playoff berth. James Madison faced No. 5 Oregon in the first round of the College Football Playoff, where the Dukes fell 51–34. Barnett completed 23 of 48 passes for 273 yards and two touchdowns while adding 45 rushing yards and a touchdown. The 34 points scored by James Madison were the most allowed by Oregon up to that point in the season. On the season, Barnett completed 216 of 370 passes for 2,806 yards, 23 touchdowns, and eight interceptions while adding 589 rushing yards and 15 rushing touchdowns. For his performance, he was named Sun Belt Conference Player of the Year, earned first-team All-Sun Belt honors, and won the Dudley Award. He also ranked among the program's single-season and career leaders at James Madison. On December 26, 2025, Barnett announced that he would enter the NCAA transfer portal.

=== UCF ===
On January 4, 2026, Barnett announced that he would transfer to UCF. Ahead of the 2026 season, Barnett was named UCF's starting quarterback by head coach Scott Frost, beating out fellow transfer quarterbacks Keyone Jenkins from FIU and Kaleb Annett from Boise State.

=== Statistics ===
Legend
	Sun Belt Conference Player of the Year
**Bold**	Career best

Season	Team	Games			Passing								Rushing			
Season	Team	GP	GS	Record	Cmp	Att	Pct	Yds	Y/A	TD	Int	Rtg	Att	Yds	Avg	TD
2022	James Madison	2	0	—	1	1	**100.0**	14	**14.0**	0	0	**217.6**	4	15	3.8	0
2023	James Madison	2	1	1–0	3	11	27.3	15	1.4	0	1	20.5	5	29	**5.8**	1
2024	James Madison	12	12	8–4	213	355	60.0	2,598	7.3	**26**	4	143.4	**135**	442	3.3	7
2025	James Madison	**14**	**14**	**12–2**	**216**	**370**	58.4	**2,806**	7.6	23	**8**	138.3	127	**589**	4.6	**15**
2026	UCF	2	2	1–1	31	49	63.3	344	7.0	2	1	131.6	18	22	1.2	1
Career		32	29	22–7	464	786	59.0	5,777	7.3	51	14	138.6	289	1,097	3.8	24

== Personal life ==
Barnett is the nephew of former NFL defensive lineman, Troy Barnett.
