= Beechcroft High School =

Public, coeducational high school in Columbus, Ohio, United States

Location
- 6100 Beechcroft Road; Columbus, (Franklin County), Ohio 43229; United States; 40°5′39″N 82°57′53″W

Information
- Type: Public, Coeducational high school
- Established: 1976
- School district: Columbus City Schools
- Superintendent: Angela Chapman
- Principal: Dr. Samuel Johnson
- Staff
- Teaching staff: 42.00 (FTE)
- Grades: 9-12
- Enrollment: 632 (2023–2024)
- Student to teacher ratio: 15.05
- Colors: Brown and Gold
- Athletics: 10 boys and 9 girls varsity sports
- Athletics conference: Columbus City League
- Team name: Cougars
- Accreditation: North Central Association of Colleges and Schools
- Website: https://beechcrofths.ccsoh.us/

Beechcroft High School is a four-year high school (grades 9–12) located on the north side of Columbus, Ohio. It is a part of Columbus City Schools. Beechcroft was first opened in 1976 as a six-year junior/senior high school. At that time, school enrollment peaked at 1,200+ students. As of the 2022-23 academic year, enrollment is listed at 658 students.

The school colors are gold and brown. The school mascot is the Cougar. Beechcroft's athletic rivals were the Brookhaven Bearcats, until Brookhaven closed in 2014. They compete in the Columbus City League athletic conference.

== Sports and activities ==
The school has 10 boys and 9 girls varsity sports which include baseball, basketball (Boys and Girls), bowling (Boys and Girls), cross country (Boys and Girls), football, softball, swimming & diving (Boys and Girls), soccer (Boys and Girls), tennis (Boys and Girls), track & field (Boys and Girls), wrestling, and volleyball.

The football program at Beechcroft competes in the Columbus City League. Beechcroft has reached the OHSAA playoffs 22 times in football (1982, 1988, 1990, 1991, 1995, 1997, 1999, 2000, 2001, 2002, 2003, 2005, 2008, 2011, 2012, 2014, 2015, 2016, 2020, 2021, 2022, 2023) Beechcroft overall record is 329-155-1

The Basketball program at Beechcroft also competes in the Columbus City League. Beechcroft has 3 city league Championships, 9 District titles, 3 Regional titles, and made the OHSAA State Final four 3 times in school history

According to Tom Dunlap, one of the best coaches ever in Central Ohio, "The first City League championship is one of my most memorable accomplishments,” Dunlap wrote. “We defeated Brookhaven 39-3 that season. I also will remember our first playoff victory in 1991. That came against Portsmouth, and coach Ward was a player on that Portsmouth team. That season, we opened with victories over Worthington Kilbourne, Thomas Worthington and Westerville South."

The school received national attention from ESPN and Sports Illustrated during the 2008 football season, after beating local league foe Centennial High School 96–0. Beechcroft scored 55 first quarter points, tying for the 4th highest point total in one quarter in national high school football history. The 96 points scored by Beechcroft also tied for the second highest point total in the nation during the 2008 high school football season.

The school's Latin Club functions as a local chapter of both the Ohio Junior Classical League (OJCL) and National Junior Classical League (NJCL).

== Notable alumni ==
- Curtis Keaton - NFL footballer
- Chip Cox - CFL player for the Montreal Alouettes, 2022 inductee Canadian Football League Hall of Fame
- Hanif Abdurraqib - poet, critic, New York Times bestselling author of Go Ahead In The Rain: Notes To A Tribe Called Quest
