= 2017 NCAA Division I Football Championship Game =

Postseason college football game

2017 NCAA Division I Football Championship
- FCS National Championship Game
Youngstown State Penguins	James Madison Dukes
(12–3)	(13–1)
MVFC	CAA
14	28
Head coach: Bo Pelini	Head coach: Mike Houston
STATS / Seed; 13 / —	STATS / Seed; 5 / 4
	1	2	3	4	Total
Youngstown State	0	7	0	7	14
James Madison	14	7	7	0	28
- Date: January 7, 2017
- Season: 2016
- Stadium: Toyota Stadium
- Location: Frisco, Texas
- MVP: Khalid Abdullah (RB, James Madison) (Note: Other sources list JMU's quarterback, Bryan Schor, as MVP.)
- Favorite: James Madison by 9
- Referee: Marshall Lewis (Sun Belt)
- Attendance: 14,423

United States TV coverage
- Network: ESPN2
- Announcers: Anish Shroff (play-by-play), Ahmad D. Brooks (color), Quint Kessenich (sideline)

The 2017 NCAA Division I Football Championship Game was a postseason college football game that determined a national champion in the NCAA Division I Football Championship Subdivision for the 2016 season. It was played at Toyota Stadium in Frisco, Texas, on January 7, 2017, with kickoff at 12:00 noon EST, and was the culminating game of the 2016 FCS Playoffs. With sponsorship from Northwestern Mutual, the game was officially known as the NCAA FCS Football Championship Presented by Northwestern Mutual.

== Teams ==
The participants of the 2017 NCAA Division I Football Championship Game were the finalists of the 2016 FCS Playoffs, which began with a 24-team bracket. No. 4 seed James Madison and unseeded Youngstown State qualified for the final by winning their semifinal games. James Madison was the designated home team for the final game.

=== Youngstown State Penguins ===
Youngstown State finished their regular season with an 8–3 record (6–2 in conference). In the FCS playoffs, they defeated Samford, Jacksonville State, Wofford, and second-seeded Eastern Washington to reach the finals. The Penguins entered the championship game with a 4–2 record in prior FCS/Division I-AA finals, contested during the 1991 through 1999 seasons.

=== James Madison Dukes ===
James Madison finished their regular season with a 10–1 record (8–0 in conference). Their only loss was to North Carolina of the FBS, 56–28. In the FCS playoffs, they defeated New Hampshire, Sam Houston State, and top-seeded North Dakota State to reach the finals. The Dukes entered the championship game with a 1–0 record in prior FCS/Division I-AA finals, having defeated Montana for the 2004 season title.

== Game summary ==
=== Scoring summary ===
Scoring summary

Quarter	Time	Drive			Team	Scoring information	Score	
Quarter	Time	Plays	Yards	TOP	Team	Scoring information	YSU	JMU
1	12:10	2	18	0:33	JMU	Jonathan Kloosterman 14-yard touchdown reception from Bryan Schor, Tyler Gray kick good	0	7
1	9:37	4	50	1:12	JMU	Rashard Davis 18-yard touchdown reception from Schor, Gray kick good	0	14
2	8:17	8	87	3:26	JMU	Khalid Abdullah 1-yard touchdown run, Gray kick good	0	21
2	3:35	3	29	1:06	YSU	Shane Kuhn 17-yard touchdown reception from Hunter Wells, Zak Kennedy kick good	7	21
3	10:10	6	47	2:53	JMU	Abdullah 2-yard touchdown run, Gray kick good	7	28
4	0:10	12	87	2:37	YSU	Jermiah Braswell 7-yard touchdown reception from Wells, Kennedy kick good	14	28
"TOP" = time of possession. For other American football terms, see Glossary of American football.							14	28

=== Game statistics ===
	1	2	3	4	Total
Penguins	0	7	0	7	14
No. 4 Dukes	14	7	7	0	28

Statistics	YSU	JMU
First downs	23	15
Plays–yards	79–292	57–253
Rushes–yards	31–21	45–141
Passing yards	271	112
Passing: comp–att–int	28–48–1	7–12–0
Time of possession	31:25	28:35

Team	Category	Player	Statistics
Youngstown State	Passing	Hunter Wells	28–47, 271 yds, 2 TD, 1 INT
Youngstown State	Rushing	Jody Webb	17 car, 41 yds
Youngstown State	Receiving	Alvin Bailey	7 rec, 68 yds
James Madison	Passing	Bryan Schor	7–12, 112 yds, 2 TD
James Madison	Rushing	Khalid Abdullah	26 car, 101 yds, 2 TD
James Madison	Receiving	Rashard Davis	3 rec, 52 yds, 1 TD
