= Troy Barnett =

American football player (born 1971)

No. 98, 90
- Position: Defensive lineman

Personal information
- Born: May 24, 1971 (age 55); Jacksonville, North Carolina, U.S.
- Listed height: 6 ft 5 in (1.96 m)
- Listed weight: 293 lb (133 kg)

Career information
- High school: Southwest (Jacksonville)
- College: North Carolina
- NFL draft: 1994: undrafted

Career history
- New England Patriots (1994–1996); Washington Redskins (1996); Chicago Bears (1997)*
- * Offseason or practice squad member only

Career NFL statistics
- Games played: 34
- Games started: 15
- Total tackles: 72
- Sacks: 3
- Stats at Pro Football Reference

Troy Anthony Barnett (born May 24, 1971) is an American former professional football player who was a defensive lineman for the New England Patriots and Washington Redskins of the National Football League (NFL). He played college football for the North Carolina Tar Heels.

Barnett was initially signed by the Patriots as a free agent in April 1994 when he was working at McDonald's. In a game against the Chicago Bears in October 1994, Barnett blocked a field goal attempt to help secure the Patriots 6–3 victory in what teammate Mike Pitts called "probably the biggest play of the season right there."

After starting 15 games for the Patriots in 1995, Barnett was waived before the start of the 1996 season. He was resigned by the Patriots in November but he only played 1 game for the Patriots in 1996 before being waived again. He was then signed by the Redskins and played 3 games for the Redskins.

Barnett was signed during the 1997 offseason but was waived before the regular season began.

== Personal life ==
Barnett's nephew, Alonza Barnett III is a quarterback for the UCF Knights.
