= Scott Lemn =

American football coach (born c. 1986)

Current position
- Title: Head coach
- Team: Bridgewater
- Conference: ODAC
- Record: 29–22

Biographical details
- Born: c. 1986 (age 39–40); Virginia Beach, Virginia, U.S.
- Education: James Madison University (2008)

Playing career
- 2004–2008: James Madison
- Position: Center

Coaching career (HC unless noted)
- 2009: Randolph–Macon (DL)
- 2010: Bridgewater (DL)
- 2011–2018: Bridgewater (OL)
- 2019–2020: Bridgewater (AHC/OC)
- 2021–present: Bridgewater

Head coaching record
- Overall: 29–22
- Bowls: 0–2

Accomplishments and honors

Awards
- 2× First Team All-CAA (2007–2008)

Scott Lemn (born c. 1986) is an American college football coach. He is the head football coach for Bridgewater College, a position he has held since 2021. He also coached for Randolph–Macon. He played college football for James Madison as a center.

== Head coaching record ==
Year	Team	Overall	Conference	Standing	Bowl/playoffs
Bridgewater Eagles (Old Dominion Athletic Conference) (2021–present)
2021	Bridgewater	4–6	1–5	6th	
2022	Bridgewater	9–2	6–1	2nd	L Neptune
2023	Bridgewater	7–4	5–2	3rd	L Cape Henry
2024	Bridgewater	6–4	4–3	4th	
2025	Bridgewater	3–6	3–4 (Note: While Bridgewater is recognized as 4–4 with their conference record, they were awarded an extra conference victory due to Guilford forfeiting a game originally scheduled for November 15, 2025. However, it is not recognized as a victory on Lemn’s record.)	T–5th	
2026	Bridgewater	0–0	0–0		
Bridgewater:		29–22	19–15		
Total:		29–22			
