= Challace McMillin =

American football player and coach (1942–2020)

Biographical details
- Born: March 18, 1942; Gilt Edge, Tennessee, U.S.
- Died: March 8, 2020 (aged 77); Harrisonburg, Virginia, U.S.

Playing career
- 1960–1963: Southwestern (TN)

Coaching career (HC unless noted)
- 1972–1984: Madison / James Madison

Head coaching record
- Overall: 67–60–2

Accomplishments and honors

Championships
- 1 VCAA

Challace Joe McMillin (March 18, 1942 – March 8, 2020) was an American football, track and field, and cross country coach. He was the first head coach of James Madison University's football program, serving from 1972 to 1984 and compiling a record of 67–60–2. A native of Gilt Edge, Tennessee, McMillin was a high school coach in Memphis, Tennessee before coming to James Madison in 1971, when he launched the school's track and field program and also coached cross country. McMillin was also a member of the faculty in James Madison's kinesiology department.

McMillin died on March 8, 2020, at age 77.

== Head coaching record ==
Year	Team	Overall	Conference	Standing	Bowl/playoffs
Madison Dukes (NCAA College Division / Division II independent) (1972–1973)
1972	Madison	0–4–1			
1973	Madison	4–5			
Madison Dukes (Virginia College Athletic Association) (1974–1975)
1974	Madison	6–4	3–2	5th	
1975	Madison	9–0–1	5–0	1st	
Madison Dukes (NCAA Division II independent) (1976)
1976	Madison	7–4			
James Madison Dukes (NCAA Division III independent) (1977–1978)
1977	James Madison	5–5			
1978	James Madison	8–2			
James Madison Dukes (NCAA Division II independent) (1979)
1979	James Madison	4–6			
James Madison Dukes (NCAA Division I-AA independent) (1980–1992)
1980	James Madison	4–6			
1981	James Madison	3–8			
1982	James Madison	8–3			
1983	James Madison	3–8			
1984	James Madison	6–5			
James Madison:		67–60–2	8–2		
Total:		67–60–2			
National championship Conference title Conference division title or championship game berth
