= 1974 Madison Dukes football team =

American college football season

1974 Madison Dukes football
- Conference: Virginia College Athletic Association
- Record: 6–4 (3–2 VCAA)
- Head coach: Challace McMillin (3rd season)
- Home stadium: Madison Field

1974 Virginia College Athletic Association football standings
	Conf.					Overall
Team	W		L		T	W		L		T
Virginia Union	2	–	0	–	0	8	–	2	–	0
Randolph–Macon	4	–	0	–	1	6	–	2	–	1
Hampden–Sydney	4	–	1	–	0	6	–	4	–	0
Virginia State	2	–	1	–	0	3	–	7	–	0
Madison	3	–	2	–	0	6	–	4	–	0
Hampton	1	–	2	–	0	3	–	7	–	0
Bridgewater	1	–	3	–	0	4	–	5	–	0
Washington and Lee	0	–	2	–	1	1	–	8	–	1
Emory & Henry	0	–	3	–	0	3	–	8	–	0
Saint Paul's (VA)	0	–	3	–	0	1	–	8	–	0

The 1974 Madison Dukes football team was an American football team that represented Madison College (now known as James Madison University) during the 1974 NCAA Division II football season as a member of the Virginia College Athletic Association (VCAA). Led by third-year head coach Challace McMillin, the Dukes compiled a record of 6–4, with a mark of 3–2 in conference play, and finished fifth in the VCAA.

== Schedule ==
Date	Opponent	Site	Result	Attendance	Source
September 21	at Washington and Lee	Wilson Field; Lexington, VA	W 24–22	3,500	
September 28	at Hampden–Sydney	Hundley Stadium; Hampden Sydney, VA	L 0–35	3,000	
October 5	at Shepherd*	Ram Stadium; Shepherdstown, WV	W 22–11	5,000	
October 12	Bridgewater	Madison Field; Harrisonburg, VA	W 41–13		
October 19	Frostburg State*	Madison Field; Harrisonburg, VA	L 17–27	2,500	
October 26	Emory and Henry	Madison Field; Harrisonburg, VA	W 34–14	9,750	
November 2	at Randolph–Macon	Day Field; Ashland, VA	L 24–29	3,000	
November 9	at Salisbury State*	Wicomico Stadium; Salisbury, MD	W 20–17	2,932	
November 16	Gallaudet*	Madison Field; Harrisonburg, VA	W 75–15	2,500	
November 22	Shippensburg*	Madison Field; Harrisonburg, VA	L 7–21		
*Non-conference game
