= Tony Deyo =

American stand-up comedian

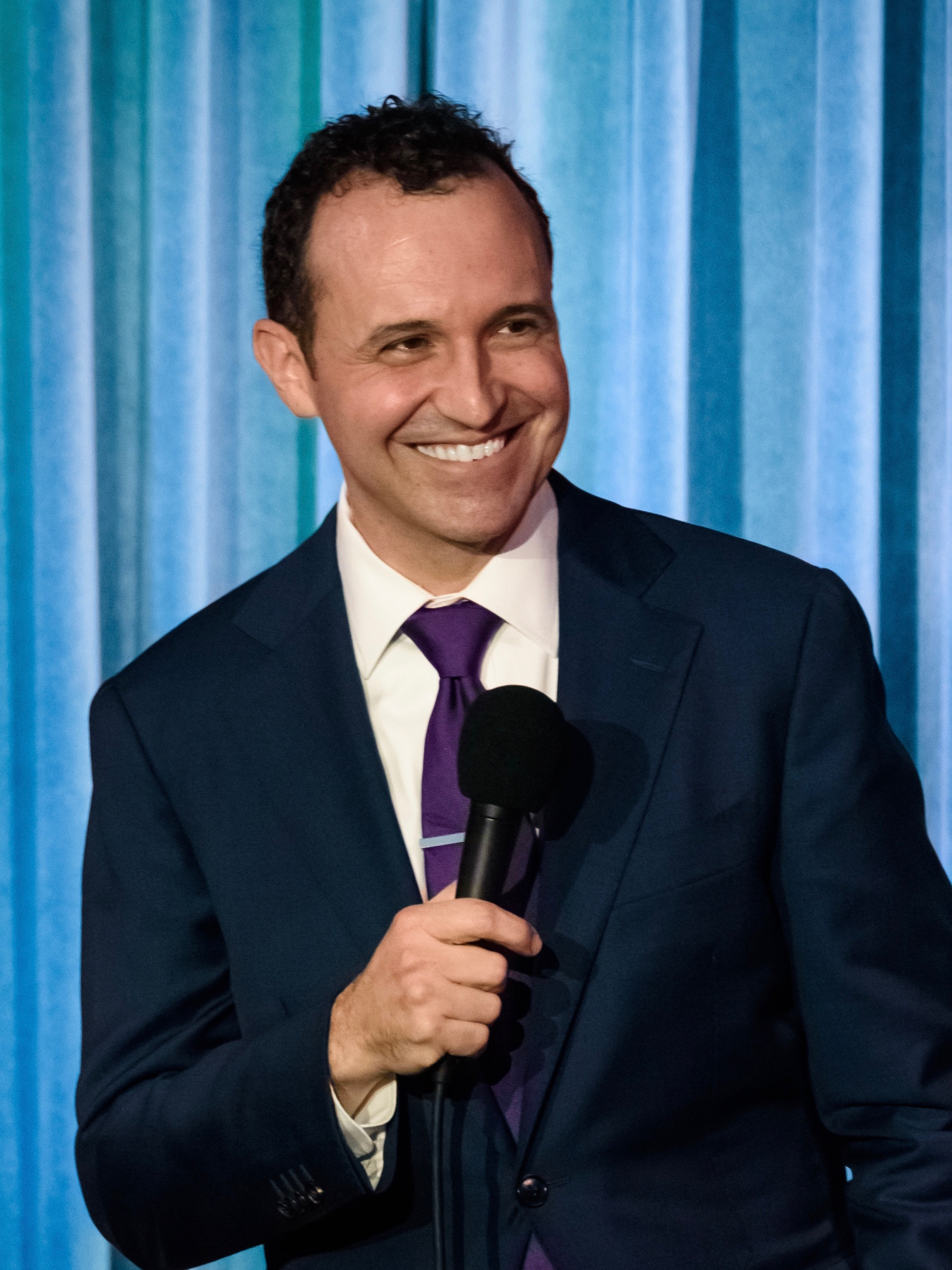
- Born: 1973 (age 52–53)
- Education: James Madison University, University of Nevada, Las Vegas

Comedy career
- Years active: 2002 - present
- Genres: Observational comedy, clean comedy, sarcasm
- Website: www.tonydeyo.com

Anthony Robert "Tony" Deyo is an American stand-up comedian. In 2013, he made his late-night television debut on Conan. Just a few months later, he made a second television appearance on The Late Late Show with Craig Ferguson. He has performed at the HBO Aspen Comedy Festival, and can be heard on SiriusXM Satellite Radio.

In 2019, Deyo recorded his third album, Secret Headliner, in front of an unexpecting audience, who had no idea who he was. “The true test of a joke,” Deyo said of the experimental album, “is will it make strangers laugh? Does it work when no one has any idea who you are?”

== Discography ==
- I’m Telling You For The First Time (2011)
- Comedy Road Trip (2016)
- Secret Headliner (2019)

== Filmography ==
Film and television appearances
Year	Title	Role	Notes
2013	Conan	Himself	1 episode
2014	The Late Late Show with Craig Ferguson	Himself	1 episode
2014	Gotham Comedy Live	Himself	1 episode
2014	Comics Unleashed	Himself	1 episode
2017	Dry Bar Comedy	Himself	1 episode
2017	Red Eye	Himself	1 episode
2019	Gotham All-Stars Live	Himself	1 episode
