= David McLeod =

American football player (born 1971)

No. 27
- Position: Wide receiver / defensive back

Personal information
- Born: August 15, 1971 (age 55); Richmond, Virginia, U.S.
- Listed height: 6 ft 0 in (1.83 m)
- Listed weight: 180 lb (82 kg)

Career information
- High school: Highland Springs (Highland Springs, Virginia)
- College: James Madison (1990–1993)
- NFL draft: 1994: undrafted

Career history
- Arizona Cardinals (1994)*; New York Jets (1994)*; Albany Firebirds (1995–1997); Grand Rapids Rampage (1998–1999); Carolina Cobras (2000–2001); Tampa Bay Storm (2002)
- * Offseason or practice squad member only

Awards and highlights
- AFL Defensive Player of the Year (1996); Second-team All-Arena (1996)

Career AFL statistics
- Receptions: 187
- Receiving yards: 2,809
- Tackles: 176.5
- Interceptions: 16
- Total TDs: 62
- Stats at ArenaFan.com

David Leroy McLeod (born August 15, 1971) is an American former professional football player who played seven seasons in the Arena Football League (AFL) with the Albany Firebirds, Grand Rapids Rampage, Carolina Cobras and Tampa Bay Storm. McLeod played college football at James Madison University. In 1996, he was the first recipient of the AFL Defensive Player of the Year Award.

== Early life ==
David Leroy McLeod was born on August 15, 1971, in Richmond, Virginia. He attended Highland Springs High School in Highland Springs, Virginia.

== College career ==
McLeod was a four-year letterman for the James Madison Dukes of James Madison University from 1990 to 1993 as a wide receiver. He set the school's single-season receiving yards record with 1,207 his senior year in 1993, earning first-team All-American and consensus first-team All-State honors. He also set the James Madison single-game receiving yards record with 192. McLeod finished his college career as the school's all-time leader in receptions with 158, receiving yards with 2,899, and receiving touchdowns with 21. He was inducted into the JMU Athletics Hall of Fame in 2020.

== Professional career ==
After going undrafted in the 1994 NFL draft, McLeod signed with the Arizona Cardinals in April 1994 as a wide receiver. He was later waived and then signed by the New York Jets. He was waived by the Jets on August 22, 1994.

McLeod played in six games for the Albany Firebirds of the Arena Football League (AFL) in 1995, catching 21 passes for 378 yards and nine touchdowns while also recording 16 solo tackles, three assisted tackles, three interceptions, and two pass breakups. He was a wide receiver/defensive back during his time in the AFL as the league played under ironman rules. McLeod appeared in all 14 games for the Firebirds during the 1996 season, totaling 35 receptions for 761 yards and 16 touchdowns, two kick returns for 56 yards and one touchdown, 67 solo tackles, eight assisted tackles, four forced fumbles, one fumble recovery, seven pass breakups, and 11 interceptions for 79 yards and one touchdown. His 11 interceptions were tied for the most in a single season in AFL history at the time. He was named second-team All-Arena and the first-ever AFL Defensive Player of the Year for his performance during the 1996 season. The Firebirds finished the year with a 10–4 record and eventually lost to the Iowa Barnstormers in the semifinal round of the playoffs. McLeod played in seven games in 1997, accumulating 21 receptions for 368 yards and six touchdowns, 20 solo tackles, three assisted tackles, one interception, and one pass breakup.

On December 17, 1997, McLeod was selected by the AFL's Grand Rapids Rampage in a dispersal draft. He was placed on injured reserve on April 27, 1998, before the start of the 1998 AFL season, and did not play in any games that year. He appeared in 12 games during the 1999 season, accumulating 45 receptions for 526 yards and 13 touchdowns, 24 solo tackles, 12 assisted tackles, one forced fumble, one fumble recovery, and seven pass breakups. McLeod was released by the Rampage in April 2000.

McLeod then played in nine games for the Carolina Cobras of the AFL in 2000, totaling 32 receptions for 430 yards and ten touchdowns, 26 solo tackles, five assisted tackles, one interception, and one pass breakup. He appeared in six games in 2001, recording 24 catches for 249 yards and five touchdowns, four solo tackles, one assisted tackle, and one pass breakup. He was waived by the Cobras in January 2002.

McLeod played in two games, both starts, for the AFL's Tampa Bay Storm during the 2002 season, catching nine passes for 97 yards and one touchdown while also posting two solo tackles, three assisted tackles, and one pass breakup. He became a free agent after the season.
