= 1977 James Madison Dukes football team =

American college football season

1977 James Madison Dukes football
- Conference: Independent
- Record: 5–5
- Head coach: Challace McMillin (6th season)
- Home stadium: Madison Stadium

1977 NCAA Division III independents football records
	Conf.			Overall
Team	W	L	T	W		L		T
Wabash ^		–		11	–	2	–	0
Albany ^		–		9	–	2	–	0
Norwich		–		7	–	2	–	0
Maryville (TN)		–		6	–	2	–	0
Dayton		–		8	–	3	–	0
Canisius		–		5	–	2	–	2
Rochester (NY)		–		6	–	3	–	0
Ashland		–		6	–	4	–	0
Grove City		–		6	–	4	–	0
James Madison		–		5	–	5	–	0
Salisbury State		–		5	–	5	–	0
Brockport		–		4	–	5	–	0
Fairleigh Dickinson–Florham		–		4	–	5	–	0
Saint Mary's		–		4	–	5	–	0
Colorado College		–		3	–	6	–	0
Union (NY)		–		2	–	5	–	1
Bowie State		–		3	–	7	–	0
San Diego		–		3	–	7	–	0
Saint Peter's		–		2	–	5	–	0
Millsaps		–		2	–	6	–	0
Georgetown		–		2	–	7	–	0
Cortland		–		2	–	8	–	0
Plattsburgh		–		1	–	6	–	1
DePauw		–		1	–	9	–	0
St. Norbert		–		0	–	10	–	0
$ – Conference champion; ^ – NCAA Division III playoff participant

The 1977 James Madison Dukes football team was an American football team that represented James Madison University during the 1977 NCAA Division III football season as an independent. Led by sixth-year head coach Challace McMillin, the Dukes compiled a record of 5–5.

== Schedule ==
Date	Opponent	Site	Result	Attendance	Source
September 10	Emory and Henry	Madison Stadium; Harrisonburg, VA	W 7–3	6,800	
September 17	at Towson State	Burdick Field; Towson, MD	L 7–13	3,552	
September 24	Hampden–Sydney	Madison Stadium; Harrisonburg, VA	W 17–14	6,500	
October 1	Shepherd	Madison Stadium; Harrisonburg, VA	L 0–10	5,800	
October 8	at Mars Hill	Meares Stadium; Mars Hill, NC	L 7–30	2,500	
October 15	Salisbury State	Madison Stadium; Harrisonburg, VA	W 42–27	3,300	
October 22	at Frostburg State	Bobcat Stadium; Frostburg, MD	W 18–0	3,200	
October 29	Randolph–Macon	Madison Stadium; Harrisonburg, VA	W 28–0	8,500	
November 5	at Guilford	Greensboro, NC	L 0–16	300	
November 12	at Shippensburg	Seth Grove Stadium; Shippensburg, PA	L 20–59	3,000	
