= 1978 James Madison Dukes football team =

American college football season

1978 James Madison Dukes football
- Conference: Independent
- Record: 8–2
- Head coach: Challace McMillin (7th season)
- Home stadium: Madison Stadium

1978 NCAA Division III independents football records
	Conf.			Overall
Team	W	L	T	W		L		T
Maryville (TN)		–		8	–	1	–	0
Wabash		–		8	–	1	–	0
Georgetown		–		7	–	1	–	0
James Madison		–		8	–	2	–	0
Dayton ^		–		9	–	2	–	1
Albany		–		7	–	3	–	0
Catholic University		–		7	–	3	–	0
Fordham		–		7	–	3	–	0
Saint Mary's		–		7	–	3	–	0
San Diego		–		7	–	3	–	0
Towson State		–		7	–	3	–	0
Colorado College		–		6	–	3	–	0
Merchant Marine		–		5	–	5	–	0
Bowie State		–		5	–	4	–	0
Brockport		–		5	–	4	–	0
Millsaps		–		5	–	4	–	0
Norwich		–		5	–	4	–	0
Rochester (NY)		–		5	–	4	–	0
Cortland		–		5	–	5	–	0
Grove City		–		4	–	4	–	1
Salisbury State		–		5	–	5	–	0
Canisius		–		4	–	5	–	0
Hofstra		–		4	–	5	–	0
Saint Francis (PA)		–		4	–	5	–	0
Union (NY)		–		3	–	5	–	0
Buffalo		–		3	–	6	–	0
Frostburg State		–		3	–	7	–	0
St. Norbert		–		3	–	7	–	0
Plattsburgh		–		2	–	6	–	0
WPI		–		2	–	6	–	0
DePauw		–		2	–	7	–	0
Wagner		–		2	–	8	–	0
Fairleigh Dickinson–Florham		–		1	–	8	–	0
^ – NCAA Division III playoff participant

The 1978 James Madison Dukes football team was an American football team that represented James Madison University during the 1978 NCAA Division III football season as an independent. Led by seventh-year head coach Challace McMillin, the Dukes compiled a record of 8–2.

== Schedule ==
Date	Opponent	Site	Result	Attendance	Source
September 9	Washington and Lee	Madison Stadium; Harrisonburg, VA	W 49–7	8,000	
September 16	Towson State	Madison Stadium; Harrisonburg, VA	W 21–14	4,700	
September 23	at Hampden–Sydney	Hundley Stadium; Hampden Sydney, VA	W 21–16	4,000	
September 30	Mars Hill	Madison Stadium; Harrisonburg, VA	W 24–14	9,800	
October 7	at Salisbury State	Wicomico Stadium; Salisbury, MD	L 9–13	1,200	
October 14	at William & Mary	Cary Field; Williamsburg, VA (rivalry)	L 7–32	14,200–15,000	
October 21	Frostburg State	Madison Stadium; Harrisonburg, VA	W 28–6	9,500	
October 28	at Randolph–Macon	Day Field; Ashland, VA	W 21–10	1,100–2,000	
November 4	Shippensburg	Madison Stadium; Harrisonburg, VA	W 14–0	5,000	
November 11	at Emory and Henry	Fullerton Field; Emory, VA	W 42–12	3,000	
