= John Daka =

American football player (born 1997)

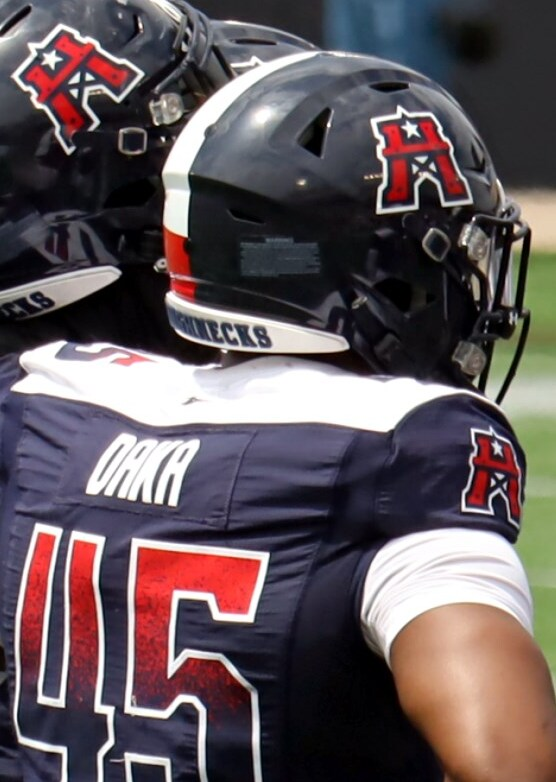
- Daka with the Houston Roughnecks in 2023

No. 45
- Position: Defensive lineman

Personal information
- Born: December 7, 1997 (age 28); Upper Marlboro, Maryland, U.S.
- Listed height: 6 ft 2 in (1.88 m)
- Listed weight: 240 lb (109 kg)

Career information
- High school: Dr. Henry A. Wise Jr.
- College: James Madison
- NFL draft: 2020: undrafted

Career history
- Baltimore Ravens (2020)*; New York Jets (2021)*; Los Angeles Rams (2021)*; Chicago Bears (2021)*; Houston Roughnecks (2023); St. Louis Battlehawks (2024)*; Toronto Argonauts (2024)*
- * Offseason or practice squad member only

Awards and highlights
- FCS national champion (2016)
- Stats at Pro Football Reference

John Daka (born December 7, 1997) is an American former professional football defensive lineman. He played college football at James Madison University. He was the first player of Zambian descent to sign with a National Football League team.

== College career ==
Daka enrolled at James Madison University despite interest from FBS schools and got off to a slow start to his career with 23 tackles and one sack over his first two seasons. He led the Football Championship Subdivision with 16.5 sacks and 28 tackles for loss in the 2019 season and was named to the All-Colonial Athletic Association first team. He played in 51 games for the Dukes, totaling 137 tackles, 47.5 tackles for losses, 27.5 sacks, four pass defenses, six forced fumbles, and one fumble recovery.

== Professional career ==
Pre-draft measurables
Height	Weight
6 ft 1 3/4 in (1.87 m)	227 lb (103 kg)
Values from Pro Day

=== Baltimore Ravens ===
Daka was signed by the Baltimore Ravens as an undrafted free agent on May 6, 2020. He was waived during final roster cuts on August 31, 2020.

=== New York Jets ===
On January 12, 2021, Daka signed a reserve/future contract with the New York Jets. He was waived on May 3, 2021.

=== Los Angeles Rams ===
On May 4, 2021, Daka was claimed off waivers by the Los Angeles Rams. He was waived on August 31, 2021.

=== Chicago Bears ===
On January 6, 2022, Daka was signed to the Chicago Bears' practice squad.

=== Houston Roughnecks ===
On November 17, 2022, Daka was drafted by the Houston Roughnecks of the XFL. The Roughnecks brand was transferred to the Houston Gamblers when the XFL and USFL merged to create the United Football League (UFL).

=== St. Louis Battlehawks ===
Daka was selected by the St. Louis Battlehawks in the fourth round of the Super Draft portion of the 2024 UFL dispersal draft on January 15, 2024. He signed with the team on January 23. He was released on March 10, 2024.

=== Toronto Argonauts ===
Daka signed with the Toronto Argonauts of the Canadian Football League on April 29, 2024, as a defensive lineman. He was placed on the reserve/suspended list on May 12, 2024. He was eventually released from his contract on September 16, 2024.
