= Anita Friedt =

American diplomat

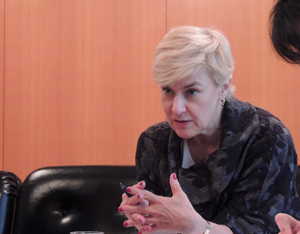
Principal Deputy Assistant Secretary for Nuclear and Strategic Policy, Bureau of Arms Control, Verification, and Compliance Anita Friedt at the 61st Pugwash Conference on Science and World Affairs in Nagasaki.

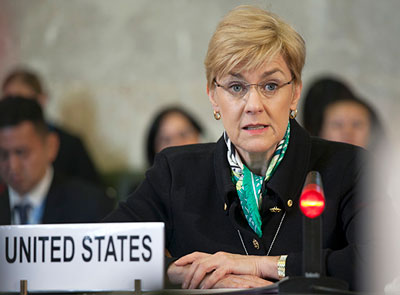
Principal Deputy Assistant Secretary of State Anita E. Friedt delivering the U.S. Statement at the Conference on Disarmament in Geneva, Switzerland, on June 25, 2013

Anita E. Friedt is an American diplomat and former U.S. Department of State senior official. She has served in various capacities related to international security, arms control, and nonproliferation. Friedt is known for strengthening transatlantic relations and advancing U.S. foreign policy objectives in Europe and beyond.

== Early life and education ==
Anita Friedt was born and raised in the United States. She holds a B.A. degree from James Madison University and an M.A. from Georgetown University.

== Diplomatic career ==
=== Early career ===
Friedt began her career in international relations with a focus on arms control and nonproliferation. She joined the U.S. Department of State, where she quickly rose through the ranks due to her expertise in nuclear and security policy. She worked on several key initiatives related to nuclear arms reduction and nonproliferation, playing a pivotal role in formulating U.S. policy in these areas.

=== Role as Principal Deputy Assistant Secretary of State ===
Since 2014 she has been the principal deputy assistant secretary in the U.S. State Department's Bureau of Arms Control, Verification, and Compliance (AVC).

Before joining the AVC Bureau, Friedt served as the director for arms control and nonproliferation at the National Security Council from 2009 to 2011, where she helped in the negotiation and ratification of the New START Treaty and worked to update conventional arms control in Europe, strengthen European security, and advance missile defense cooperation with Russia. Previous to her assignment on the National Security Council, Friedt served as the director of the Office of Policy and Regional Affairs in the Bureau of European and Eurasian Affairs.

In her career at the Department of State, Friedt has been focusing on European foreign policy with an emphasis on Russia and European security and nonproliferation. Friedt worked on European security issues, including NATO missile defense and missile defense cooperation with Russia. Friedt began her career at the Department of State working as an advisor to Under Secretary of State for Political Affairs and then Deputy Secretary of State Walter Stoessel. She worked as a Soviet and then Russian foreign policy analyst in the State Department's Bureau of Intelligence and Research, and served two tours in the Political Section at the U.S. Embassy in Moscow, from 1989 to 1992 and again from 1997 to 1999.

== Awards and recognition ==
Friedt has earned numerous awards, including seven Superior Honor Awards for her work on U.S.-Russia and European Security issues.
