= Mike Houston (American football) =

American football player and coach (born 1971)

Current position
- Title: Head Coach
- Team: Wofford
- Conference: SOCON

Biographical details
- Born: November 15, 1971 (age 55); Franklin, North Carolina, U.S.

Playing career
- 1990–1993: Mars Hill
- Position: Tight end

Coaching career (HC unless noted)
- 1994–1995: Forbush HS (NC) (DC)
- 1996–2000: T. C. Roberson HS (NC) (DC)
- 2001–2005: T. C. Roberson HS (NC)
- 2006: Brevard (DC)
- 2007–2010: Lenoir–Rhyne (DC)
- 2011–2013: Lenoir–Rhyne
- 2014–2015: The Citadel
- 2016–2018: James Madison
- 2019–2024: East Carolina
- 2025–2026: Clemson (volunteer DA)
- 2027–present: Wofford

Head coaching record
- Overall: 107–63 (college); 42–18 (high school)
- Bowls: 1–0
- Tournaments: 4–2 (Division II); 9–3 (Division I)

Accomplishments and honors

Championships
- 1 NCAA Division I (2016); 3 South Atlantic (2011–2013); 1 SoCon (2015); 2 CAA (2016–2017)

Awards
- SoCon Coach of the Year: 2015; SAC Coach of the Year: 2011, 2012, 2013; AFCA Region I Coach of the Year: 2015, 2016; AFCA National FCS Coach of the Year: 2016; CAA Coach of the Year: 2016; ECAC Bob Ford FCS Coach of the Year: 2016

Michael Glenn Houston (born November 14, 1971) is an American football coach who is currently the head coach of Wofford College. He previously won the 2016 FCS championship during his time as the head coach of James Madison. Houston has also served as the head coach of Lenoir–Rhyne, The Citadel and East Carolina.

== Early life ==
Houston played as a tight end at Mars Hill, where he earned a degree in biology in 1994.

== Coaching career ==
=== Early coaching career ===
Houston began his coaching career that fall as defensive coordinator at Forbush High School in East Bend, North Carolina, where he remained for two seasons. He moved to the same position at T. C. Roberson High School in Asheville, North Carolina. After five seasons, he was elevated to the head coaching position. In his five years as head coach, he compiled a record of 42–18, including a 5–4 playoff record, and earned the 2002 and 2004 Asheville Citizen-Times Area Coach of the Year awards. In 2004, his team finished the regular season undefeated, falling in the state semifinals and winning the first conference championship in school history. He also served as an assistant coach for the North Carolina team in the 2005 Shrine Bowl, helping lead them to a victory over South Carolina's squad.

=== Brevard ===
In 2006, Houston moved to the college ranks, serving as defensive coordinator and associate head coach at Brevard in their first season of football in 56 years. The Tornados won two games while starting a roster mostly composed of true freshmen.

=== Lenoir–Rhyne ===
In 2007, Houston became defensive coordinator at Lenoir–Rhyne. In his final season as defensive coordinator, the Bears defense led the South Atlantic Conference in total defense and were fourth in the nation in rushing defense. He was named head coach prior to the 2011 season. In his first season, the Bears finished 7–3, shared the conference title, and earned Houston Coach of the Year honors. The next season, he led the Bears to the Division II playoffs and their first playoff win since 1962 and again earned Coach of the Year honors. In his third and final season, the Bears reached the national championship game, falling 43–28 to undefeated Northwest Missouri State. Houston again was named SAC Coach of the Year and drew interest from several larger programs, as the Bears set an NCAA all-division rushing record.

=== The Citadel ===
Houston was hired as the 24th head coach at The Citadel in January 2014. After a 5–7 opening season, he led the 2015 Bulldogs to their first conference championship since 1992, and only third in program history. They notched a win over FBS in state foe, South Carolina and also made their first playoff appearance in 23 years. For his efforts, Houston was named Southern Conference Coach of the Year.

=== James Madison ===
On January 18, 2016, Houston was named as the 7th head coach of the Dukes football program. Houston had a successful tenure as head coach of the Dukes as he led them to three FCS Playoff appearances and two national title game appearances. In 2016 Houston guided the Dukes to a 14–1 record and the 2016 NCAA Division I FCS Football Championship following a 28–14 win over No. 13 Youngstown State. In 2017, Houston led JMU to a 14–1 record and an appearance in the national title game where the Dukes had their only loss of the season as they were beaten by North Dakota State 17–13.

=== East Carolina ===
Houston became the Pirates' 22nd head coach on December 4, 2018. Houston, along with his assembled coaching staff, were responsible for turning around an ECU football program with five consecutive losing seasons dating back to 2015. Houston led the Pirates to their first winning season in six years in 2021, finishing at a 7–5 record. Houston made his first FBS bowl game (Military Bowl) in 2021 against Boston College. Due to COVID-19 protocols, Boston College had to back out of the game so it became a no-contest. Houston and staff led the 2022 ECU football team to a 8–5 record and a victory in the Birmingham Bowl against Coastal Carolina University.

On October 20, 2024, a day after the Pirates fell to 3–4 on the season after a 45–28 loss to Army, Houston was fired.

=== Clemson ===
On February 10, 2025, Houston was brought on as a volunteer defensive assistant at Clemson.

=== Wofford ===
On November 10, 2026, Houston was named the 25th head coach of the Wofford Terriers, replacing the retiring Shawn Watson.

== Head coaching record ==
=== College ===
| Year | Team | Overall | Conference | Standing | Bowl/playoffs | AFCA/STATS^{#} | Coaches^{°} |
|---|---|---|---|---|---|---|---|
Lenoir–Rhyne Bears (South Atlantic Conference) (2011–2013)
| 2011 | Lenoir–Rhyne | 7–3 | 6–1 | T–1st | | | |
| 2012 | Lenoir–Rhyne | 9–3 | 6–1 | 1st | L NCAA Division II Second Round | 20 | |
| 2013 | Lenoir–Rhyne | 13–2 | 7–0 | 1st | L NCAA Division II Championship | 2 | |
| Lenoir–Rhyne: | | 29–8 | 19–2 | | | | |
The Citadel Bulldogs (Southern Conference) (2014–2015)
| 2014 | The Citadel | 5–7 | 3–4 | 5th | | | |
| 2015 | The Citadel | 9–4 | 6–1 | 1st | L NCAA Division I Second Round | 13 | 15 |
| The Citadel: | | 14–11 | 9–5 | | | | |
James Madison Dukes (Colonial Athletic Association) (2016–2018)
| 2016 | James Madison | 14–1 | 8–0 | 1st | W NCAA Division I Championship | 1 | 1 |
| 2017 | James Madison | 14–1 | 8–0 | 1st | L NCAA Division I Championship | 2 | 2 |
| 2018 | James Madison | 9–4 | 6–2 | 2nd | L NCAA Division I Second Round | 9 | 10 |
| James Madison: | | 37–6 | 22–2 | | | | |
East Carolina Pirates (American Athletic Conference) (2019–2024)
| 2019 | East Carolina | 4–8 | 1–7 | 5th (East) | | | |
| 2020 | East Carolina | 3–6 | 3–5 | T–8th | | | |
| 2021 | East Carolina | 7–5 | 5–3 | T–3rd | NC Military | | |
| 2022 | East Carolina | 8–5 | 4–4 | T–6th | W Birmingham | | |
| 2023 | East Carolina | 2–10 | 1–7 | T–13th | | | |
| 2024 | East Carolina | 3–4 | 1–2 | (Note: Houston was fired seven games into the season.) | | | |
| East Carolina: | | 27–38 | 15–28 | | | | |
| Total: | | 107–63 | | | | | |
National championship Conference title Conference division title or championship game berth
^{#}Rankings from final AFCA poll for Lenoir–Rhyne and final STATS poll for The Citadel and James Madison.; ^{°}Rankings from final FCS Coaches' poll.
