= Daniel Brown (American football) =

American football player (born 1992)

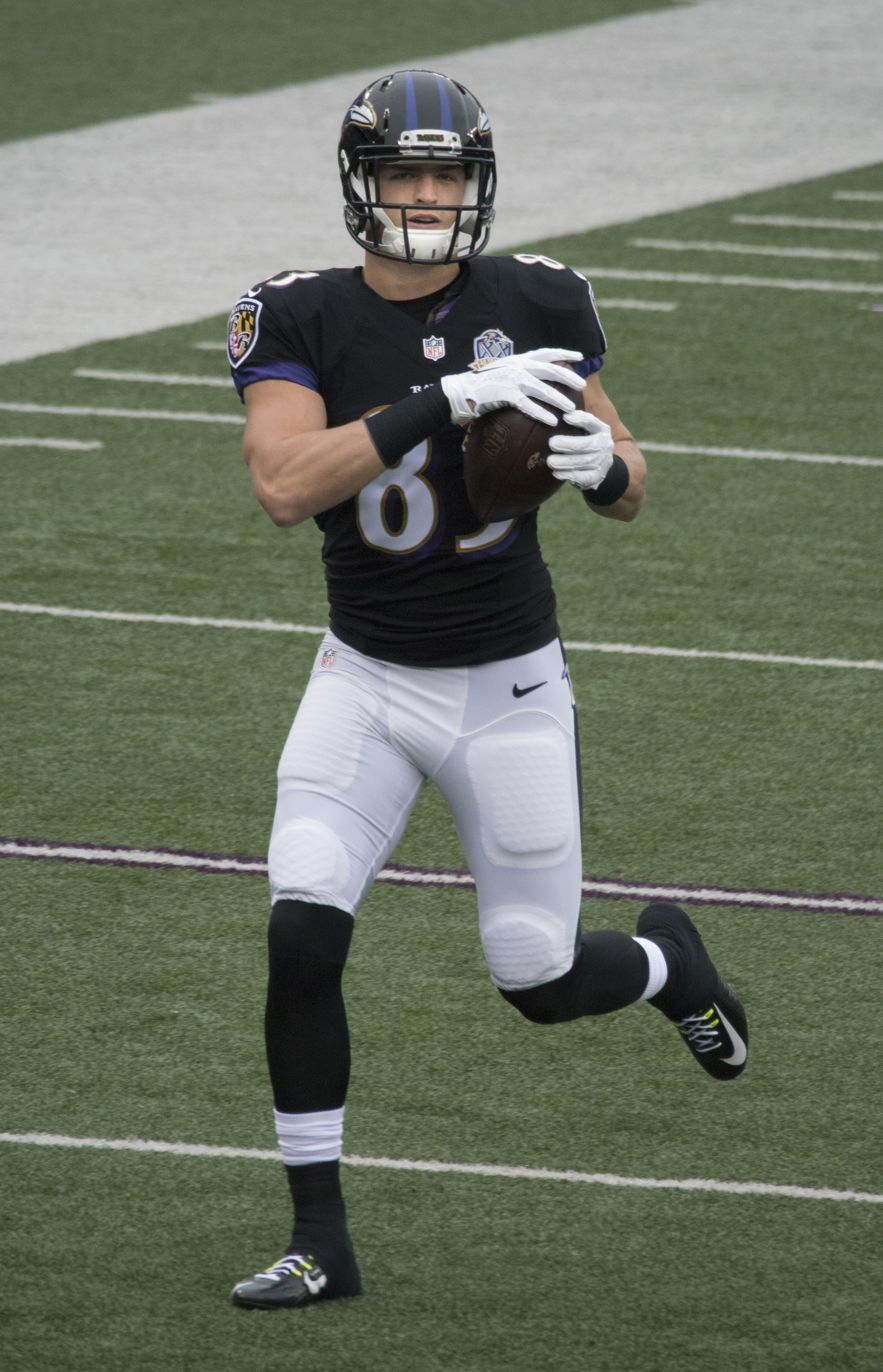
- Brown with the Baltimore Ravens in 2015

No. 83, 85, 87
- Position: Tight end

Personal information
- Born: May 26, 1992 (age 34); Windsor, Virginia, U.S.
- Listed height: 6 ft 5 in (1.96 m)
- Listed weight: 247 lb (112 kg)

Career information
- High school: Isle of Wight Academy (Isle of Wight County, Virginia)
- College: James Madison
- NFL draft: 2015: undrafted

Career history
- Baltimore Ravens (2015–2016); Chicago Bears (2016–2018); New York Jets (2019–2021); Kansas City Chiefs (2021); New York Jets (2021)*
- * Offseason or practice squad member only

Career NFL statistics
- Receptions: 46
- Receiving yards: 449
- Receiving touchdowns: 2
- Stats at Pro Football Reference

Daniel Brown (born May 26, 1992) is an American former professional football player who was a tight end in the National Football League (NFL). He played college football for the James Madison Dukes, and was signed by the Baltimore Ravens as an undrafted free agent in 2015. He was also a member of the Chicago Bears, New York Jets and Kansas City Chiefs.

== Early life ==
Brown attended Isle of Wight Academy, where he was a three-sport athlete (basketball, football, and baseball). From 2005 to 2007, he helped Isle of Wight win three consecutive state championships. As a junior, he was named Second-team All-State and First-team All-conference. As senior, he was named First-team All-state, as well as All-Conference. During his junior and senior seasons in basketball, he was named First-team All-state and All-conference. He was named a team captain in basketball as a freshman, junior and senior. In baseball, he was named First-team All-state, and All-Conference as a senior, as well as the team's Most Valuable Player (MVP) as a sophomore and senior. He was also named to the honor roll during all four years at Isle of Wight Academy.

== College career ==
After graduating from Isle of Wight Academy, Brown began attending James Madison University, where he majored in computer information systems.

As a true freshman in 2010, he redshirted and did not play in his first season at James Madison. He returned in 2011 and was able to redshirt for the second consecutive year. He was used primarily as a reserve wide receiver throughout the season. In the 2011 season opener against North Carolina, he recorded a 41-yard touchdown reception. He finished his freshman season with five receptions for 157 yards and one touchdown in 12 games. In 2012, he played the first three games before suffering a season-ending injury against West Virginia. He finished the season with two receptions for 22 receiving yards and a touchdown. After his junior season was cut short, he returned in 2013 and had his best collegiate season. He ended the season with a career-high 42 receptions for 665 receiving yards, and eight touchdowns in 11 games. In 2014, he returned as a redshirt senior. On November 1, 2014, he recorded a career-high eight receptions for 128 yards and a touchdown against William & Mary. He finished his last collegiate season with 42 catches for 606 yards and seven touchdowns.

Brown finished his college career with a total of 91 receptions for 1,450 receiving yards and 17 touchdown receptions in 38 games.

== Professional career ==
=== Baltimore Ravens ===
With limited experience, Brown went undrafted in the 2015 NFL draft. On May 12, 2015, he was signed by the Baltimore Ravens as an undrafted free agent. In Week 2 of the pre-season, he caught a 28-yard touchdown reception against the Philadelphia Eagles. In Week 4 against the Atlanta Falcons, he recorded three receptions for 30-yards and a touchdown. After the pre-season, he was waived and signed to the Ravens' practice squad. On November 29, 2015, he was activate promoted to the main roster after the Ravens suffered injuries to their receiving corps, with season-ending injuries to Steve Smith Sr., Michael Campanaro, Breshad Perriman, Cam Worthy, and Darren Waller. On November 30, 2015, Brown received his first playing time on Monday Night Football against the Cleveland Browns.

On September 3, 2016, Brown was waived by the Ravens. The next day, he was signed to the Ravens' practice squad. He was promoted to the active roster on October 5, 2016. On October 22, 2016, he was released by the Ravens.

=== Chicago Bears ===
On October 24, 2016, the Chicago Bears claimed Brown off waivers. On November 27, he recorded his first career touchdown reception in a loss to the Tennessee Titans. Brown finished the 2016 season with three starts in eight games, recording sixteen passes for 124 yards and a touchdown.

On March 6, 2017, Brown re-signed with the Bears. Brown started twice in fourteen games, logging 13 receptions for 129 yards.

On March 16, 2018, Brown re-signed with the Bears.

=== New York Jets (first stint) ===
On March 18, 2019, Brown signed with the New York Jets.

On February 13, 2020, Brown was re-signed to a one-year deal. He was placed on the active/non-football injury list at the start of training camp on July 30, 2020. He was activated on August 22, 2020. Brown was released during final roster cuts on September 5, 2020, but was re-signed two days later.

Brown re-signed with the Jets again on April 19, 2021.

=== Kansas City Chiefs ===
Brown was traded to the Kansas City Chiefs in exchange for offensive lineman Laurent Duvernay-Tardif on November 2, 2021. He was waived on November 20, 2021.

=== New York Jets (second stint) ===
On November 30, 2021, Brown was signed to the Jets practice squad.

== Personal life ==
Brown was raised by his parents, Mike and Cathy Brown, and Carolyn Brown.
