= 1975 Madison Dukes football team =

American college football season

1975 Madison Dukes football

VCAA champion
- Conference: Virginia College Athletic Association
- Record: 9–0–1 (5–0 VCAA)
- Head coach: Challace McMillin (4th season)
- Home stadium: Madison Stadium

1975 Virginia College Athletic Association football standings
	Conf.					Overall
Team	W		L		T	W		L		T
Madison $	5	–	0	–	0	9	–	0	–	1
Virginia Union	2	–	0	–	0	7	–	4	–	0
Hampden–Sydney	4	–	1	–	0	7	–	2	–	0
Virginia State	2	–	1	–	0	2	–	8	–	0
Randolph–Macon	3	–	2	–	0	6	–	4	–	0
Hampton	1	–	2	–	0	5	–	5	–	0
Saint Paul's (VA)	1	–	2	–	0	2	–	8	–	0
Emory & Henry	0	–	3	–	0	2	–	9	–	0
Washington and Lee	0	–	3	–	0	1	–	8	–	1
Bridgewater	0	–	4	–	0	2	–	7	–	0
$ – Conference champion

The 1975 Madison Dukes football team was an American football team that represented Madison College (now known as James Madison University) during the 1975 NCAA Division II football season as a member of the Virginia College Athletic Association (VCAA). Led by fourth-year head coach Challace McMillin, the Dukes compiled a record of 9–0–1, with a mark of 5–0 in conference play, and finished as VCAA champion.

== Schedule ==
Date	Opponent	Site	Result	Attendance	Source
September 13	at Glenville State*	Glenville, WV	T 0–0		
September 20	Washington and Lee	Madison Stadium; Harrisonburg, VA	W 21–16	4,000	
September 27	Hampden–Sydney	Madison Stadium; Harrisonburg, VA	W 3–0	5,500	
October 4	Shepherd*	Madison Stadium; Harrisonburg, VA	W 13–7	8,000	
October 11	at Bridgewater	Bridgewater, VA	W 10–7		
October 18	at Frostburg State*	Bobcat Stadium; Frostburg, MD	W 21–20		
October 25	at Emory and Henry	Fullerton Field; Emory, VA	W 7–0		
November 1	Randolph–Macon	Madison Stadium; Harrisonburg, VA	W 12–7		
November 8	Salisbury State*	Madison Stadium; Harrisonburg, VA	W 24–15		
November 15	at Shippensburg*	Seth Grove Stadium; Shippensburg, PA	W 14–3		
*Non-conference game
