= Curtis Keaton =

American football player (born 1976)

No. 29, 28
- Position: Running back

Personal information
- Born: October 18, 1976 (age 50); Columbus, Ohio, U.S.
- Listed height: 5 ft 10 in (1.78 m)
- Listed weight: 220 lb (100 kg)

Career information
- High school: Beechcroft (Columbus}
- College: James Madison (1998–1999)
- NFL draft: 2000: 4th round, 97th overall pick

Career history
- Cincinnati Bengals (2000–2001); New Orleans Saints (2002); New York Giants (2003)*
- * Offseason or practice squad member only

Career NFL statistics
- Rushing attempts: 23
- Rushing yards: 91
- Receptions: 1
- Receiving yards: 9
- Stats at Pro Football Reference

Curtis Isaiah Keaton (born October 18, 1976) is an American former professional football player who was a running back in the National Football League (NFL). He was selected by the Cincinnati Bengals in the fourth round of the 2000 NFL draft and also played for the New Orleans Saints. He played college football for the James Madison Dukes and West Virginia Mountaineers. He attended Beechcroft High School in Columbus, Ohio.
