= Bryan Schor =

American football player and coach (born 1995)

Current position
- Title: Tight ends coach
- Team: James Madison
- Conference: Sun Belt Conference

Biographical details
- Born: March 24, 1995 (age 31); Milford, Pennsylvania

Playing career
- 2014–2017: James Madison
- 2019: Winnipeg Blue Bombers
- 2019: Ottawa Redblacks
- Position: Quarterback

Coaching career (HC unless noted)
- 2020–2021: East Carolina (GA)
- 2022–2024: Georgia Southern (sr. analyst)
- 2025–2026: Georgia Southern (TE)
- 2026-present: James Madison (TE)

Accomplishments and honors

Awards
- FCS national champion (2016); Dudley Award (2016); CAA Offensive Player of the Year (2016); First Team All-CAA (2016); Second Team All-CAA (2017)

Bryan Schor (born March 24, 1995) is an American football coach and former professional quarterback who serves as the tight ends coach at James Madison. He played college football at James Madison University, where he led the Dukes to the 2016 FCS national championship, and later spent time in the Canadian Football League before transitioning into coaching.

== Early life ==
Schor attended Delaware Valley High School in Milford, Pennsylvania, where he earned all-conference, all-county, and all-state honors as a quarterback. He completed his high school career with 6,518 passing yards and 56 touchdowns.

== Playing career ==
=== Lackawanna College ===
Schor began his collegiate career at Lackawanna College before transferring to James Madison University.

=== James Madison ===
After transferring to James Madison, Schor became the Dukes’ starting quarterback during the 2016 season. He led JMU to a 14–1 record and captured the 2016 NCAA Division I FCS National Championship, defeating Youngstown State in the title game.

During the 2016 season, Schor passed for over 3,000 yards and accounted for more than 30 total touchdowns. He earned All-American honors, was named Colonial Athletic Association (CAA) Offensive Player of the Year, earned First Team All-CAA recognition, and won the Bill Dudley Award as Virginia's top Division I player.

Schor returned as the starter in 2017 and was named a team captain, leading JMU to a second consecutive appearance in the FCS National Championship Game. He finished the season with 3,222 passing yards, 26 passing touchdowns, and seven rushing touchdowns, earning Second Team All-CAA honors.

At the conclusion of his collegiate career, Schor became James Madison's all-time leader in passing yards, passing touchdowns, completions, and total offense, and was a finalist for the Walter Payton Award.

=== Statistics ===
| Season | Team | Games | | | Passing | | | | | | | | Rushing | | | |
| Season | Team | GP | GS | Record | Cmp | Att | Pct | Yds | Avg | TD | Int | Rtg | Att | Yds | Avg | TD |
|---|---|---|---|---|---|---|---|---|---|---|---|---|---|---|---|---|
| 2014 | James Madison | 5 | 0 | 9–4 | 1 | 2 | 50.0 | 7 | 3.5 | 0 | 0 | 79.4 | 0 | 0 | 0.0 | 0 |
| 2015 | James Madison | 8 | 4 | 9–3 | 70 | 111 | 63.1 | 847 | 7.6 | 7 | 1 | 146.2 | 78 | 276 | 3.5 | 4 |
| 2016 | James Madison | 14 | 14 | 14–1 | 217 | 297 | 73.1 | 3,002 | 10.1 | 29 | 6 | 186.2 | 126 | 569 | 4.5 | 10 |
| 2017 | James Madison | 15 | 15 | 14–1 | 271 | 417 | 65.0 | 3,222 | 7.7 | 26 | 14 | 143.8 | 146 | 322 | 2.2 | 7 |
| Career | | 42 | 33 | 46–9 | 559 | 827 | 67.6 | 7,078 | 8.6 | 62 | 21 | 350 | 1,167 | 3.3 | 21 | |

== Professional career ==
Following his collegiate career, Schor pursued a professional career in the Canadian Football League. He signed his first professional contract with the Winnipeg Blue Bombers on January 30, 2019.

Schor participated in offseason activities and training camp with Winnipeg before later joining the Ottawa Redblacks during the 2019 season. He did not appear in a regular-season game and transitioned into coaching following the season.

== Coaching career ==
Schor transitioned into coaching in the spring of 2020, when he was hired as an offensive graduate assistant at East Carolina University. He served in that role through the 2020 and 2021 seasons, contributing to offensive game planning and working closely with the Pirates’ quarterbacks, including Holton Ahlers.

In the spring of 2022, Schor was hired by Georgia Southern as a senior analyst, where he assisted with film breakdown, opponent scouting, and offensive support. He remained in that role through the 2024 season.

In January 2025, Schor was promoted to tight ends coach, marking his first on-field assistant coaching role at the FBS level.

In 2026, Schor returned to his alma mater, James Madison, as tight ends coach under head coach Billy Napier.

== Personal life ==
Before entering coaching, Schor worked in insurance in Northern Virginia.
