= Anne Savedge =

American photographer

Anne Savedge is an American photographic artist and art educator.

== Education and career ==
Anne Savedge studied at James Madison University and Virginia Commonwealth University. She has taught at the Chesterfield Technical Center, Brightpoint Community College, and Virginia Museum of Fine Arts.

== Exhibitions ==
Her exhibition Shootin' at Artspace in 2016 was based on her interest in Westerns and cowboys. Her exhibition Seasons and Gardens was shown at Artspace in 2012. Savedge was chosen as one of the artists with over 25 years of outstanding careers for a show at the Richmond Public Library.

== Collections ==
- Virginia Museum of Fine Arts
- Center for Photography at Woodstock
- Taubman Museum of Art
- Longwood Center for the Visual Arts
- Chrysler Museum of Art

== Photography ==
Her work was included in Light and Lens: Photography in the Digital Age by Robert J. Hirsch, pp. 256.

== Awards ==
- Southeastern Art Educator of the Year (2000).
- Virginia Art Educator of the Year (1998–1999).
- Virginia Museum Professional Artist Fellowship (2001–2002).
- Individual Artist Fellowship, Virginia Commission for the Arts (1999).
