= Justin Rascati =

American football coach (born 1984)

Cincinnati Bengals
- Title: Pass game coordinator

Personal information
- Born: February 8, 1984 (age 42); Gainesville, Florida, U.S.

Career information
- Position: Quarterback
- High school: Buchholz (Gainesville, Florida)
- College: Louisville (2002–2003); James Madison (2004–2007)

Career history

Playing
- Peoria Pirates (2008); Lexington Horsemen (2009)

Coaching
- Kentucky Country Day School (2010–2011) Offensive coordinator; Weber State (2012–2013) Quarterbacks coach; UT Martin (2014–2015) Wide receivers coach; Tennessee Tech (2016) Offensive coordinator; Chattanooga (2017–2018) Offensive coordinator & quarterbacks coach; Denver Broncos (2019–2021) Offensive quality control coach; Minnesota Vikings (2022–2023) Assistant offensive line coach; Cincinnati Bengals (2024–present) Pass game coordinator

Justin Rascati (born February 8, 1984) is an American football coach, who is currently the pass game coordinator for the Cincinnati Bengals of the National Football League (NFL).

== Playing career ==
Coming out of Buchholz High School, Rascati committed to play college football for the Louisville Cardinals. He played just five games where he completed 14 of 24 passes for 177 yards and a touchdown to two interceptions. After the 2003 season, Rascati decided to enter his name into the NCAA transfer portal. He transferred to play for the James Madison, where he helped the Dukes win their first FCS Championship in 2004. Rascati finished his career at James Madison throwing for 5,912 yards and 51 touchdowns with an average quarterback rating of 155.2. After his collegiate career, he played for the Chicago Bears and Montreal Alouettes briefly on the team's training camp rosters, before playing two seasons in the Arena Football League.

== Coaching career ==
Rascati got his first coaching job as the offensive coordinator at Kentucky Country Day School. In 2012, he was hired as the quarterbacks coach at Weber State. In 2014, Rascati was hired to serve as the wide receivers coach at UT Martin. In 2016, he got his first offensive coordinator role being hired by the Tennessee Tech Golden Eagles. After one season with the Golden Eagles, Rascati joined the Chattanooga Mocs as the team's offensive coordinator and quarterbacks coach. In 2019, Rascati got his first NFL coaching job being hired by the Denver Broncos as an offensive quality control. After three years with the Broncos, he was hired by the Minnesota Vikings in 2022 to serve as the team's assistant offensive line coach. Ahead of the 2024 season, Rascati joined the Cincinnati Bengals as the team's passing game coordinator.
