= Khalid Abdullah (running back) =

American football player (born 1995)

No. 31, 23, 32
- Position: Running back

Personal information
- Born: May 14, 1995 (age 31); Newport News, Virginia, U.S.
- Listed height: 5 ft 9 in (1.75 m)
- Listed weight: 226 lb (103 kg)

Career information
- High school: Heritage High School
- College: James Madison
- NFL draft: 2017: undrafted

Career history
- New York Giants (2017)*; YCF Grit (2018–2019); DC Defenders (2020)
- * Offseason or practice squad member only

Awards and highlights
- FCS national champion (2016); FCS Championship Game MVP (2016)

Khalid Abdullah (born May 14, 1995) is an American former professional football running back. He attended college at James Madison University. He played for the DC Defenders of the XFL in 2020.

== College career ==
Abdullah played college football for the James Madison Dukes, competing in the NCAA Division I Football Championship Subdivision (FCS). When the Dukes won the FCS championship for the 2016 season, Abdullah was MVP of the Championship Game played in January 2017, as the Dukes defeated the Youngstown State Penguins.

== Professional career ==
=== New York Giants ===
After going undrafted in the 2017 NFL draft, Abdullah signed with the New York Giants. On September 3, 2017, he was released.

=== Team Grit ===
Abdullah played for Team Grit of YCF in 2018 and 2019.

=== DC Defenders ===
In October 2019, Abdullah was drafted by the DC Defenders during the open phase of the 2020 XFL draft. He had his contract terminated when the league suspended operations on April 10, 2020.
