= Rodney Landers =

American football player (born 1986)

No. 7
- Position: Quarterback / wide receiver

Personal information
- Born: May 13, 1986 (age 40); Bethesda, Maryland, U.S.
- Listed height: 6 ft 1 in (1.85 m)
- Listed weight: 220 lb (100 kg)

Career information
- High school: Virginia Beach (VA) Tallwood
- College: James Madison
- NFL draft: 2009: undrafted

Career history
- Richmond Revolution (2009–2010); Richmond Raiders (2011)

Awards and highlights
- 2008 Dudley Award winner; 2008 Walter Payton Award runner-up; 2008 AP second-team All-American; 2008 first-team All-CAA; 2008 CAA Offensive Player of the Year; 2008 ECAC Player of the Year; 2008 first-team all-Virginia state; 2007 James Madison co-MVP; 2007 second-team All-CAA; 2007 first-team all-state

Rodney Landers (born May 13, 1986) is an American former football player. He played college football as the starting quarterback for the James Madison Dukes of James Madison University (JMU). He was not selected in the 2009 NFL draft, where due to his speed and flexibility he had been considered a potential defensive back, running back, wide receiver, or quarterback prospect. He spent time with the Richmond Revolution as a back-up Quarterback, Receiver and Return Specialist.

== Early life ==
Landers was born in Bethesda, Maryland and grew up in Virginia Beach, Virginia, where he attended Tallwood High School. He played as a quarterback and as senior threw for 815 yards and eight touchdowns and ran for 644 yards and 11 touchdowns. He was twice named second-team all-district as a junior and senior, and, as a senior, was named the first-team All-Tidewater quarterback. He also participated in the Virginia state all-star game.

== College career ==
Landers spent his first year at JMU, 2004, as a redshirt. In 2005, he saw action in eight games where he completed five of seven pass attempts for 47 yards and a touchdown and ran for 212 yards and a touchdown on 25 carries. He also played a role on special teams where he recorded tackles against Massachusetts and Delaware. In 2006, Landers saw action in eight games as a back-up quarterback, wide receiver, and running back. He completed four of six pass attempts for 29 yards, ran for 222 yards and a touchdown on 24 carries, and caught six passes for 61 yards.

In 2007, Landers was named a team captain and a starter. He started in all of JMU's games. He completed 130 of 205 pass attempts for a 0.634 completion rate, 1,678 yards, 13 touchdowns, and five interceptions. Landers set the JMU single-season quarterback rushing record with 1,273 yards. At Rhode Island, he set a school record with 408 yards of total offense (166 rushing and 242 passing yards). Landers was named the Colonial Athletic Association (CAA) Offensive Player of the Week after the games against Rhode Island and Villanova, the team co-Most Valuable Player, first-team all-state by the Roanoke Times, and second-team All-CAA. He was one of only two quarterbacks ranked in the top-65 rushers for the season. Landers helped lead JMU to an 8–4 record, and an appearance in the Division I FCS playoffs, where they lost to Appalachian State in the first round, to finish ranked number-12 in the nation.

In 2008, Landers returned as the Dukes' starting quarterback. That season, he completed 112 of 177 passes for 1,534 yards, 21 touchdowns, and just four interceptions. During the 2008 season, Landers helped lead the Dukes to a 12–2 record, including a semifinals loss to Montana, and a number-three final ranking. He was named an Associated Press Division I FCS second-team All-American, first-team All-CAA, the CAA Offensive Player of the Year, and the Eastern College Athletic Conference Player of the Year. Landers also won the Dudley Award, which is awarded to the most outstanding Division I college football player in the state of Virginia. It was the first time since 1998 that it had gone to a player not from one of the two Division I FBS teams in the state, Virginia or Virginia Tech. He was also finished second among three finalists for the Walter Payton Award, awarded to the most outstanding player in Division I FCS football, which eventually went to Armanti Edwards of Appalachian State.

=== College statistics ===
James Madison			Passing							Rushing			
Season	GP	GS	Rating	Cmp	Att	%	Yds	TD	Int	Att	Yds	Avg	TD
2005	8	–	174.97	7	5	71.4	47	1	0	25	224	8.5	2
2006	8	–	107.27	4	6	66.7	29	0	0	24	222	9.2	1
2007	12	12	148.21	130	205	63.4	1,678	13	5	223	1,273	5.7	12
2008	14	14	170.73	112	177	63.3	1,534	21	4	268	1,770	6.6	16
Totals	42	26	159.52	253	393	64.4	3,288	35	9	540	3,489	6.5	31

== Professional career ==
He was considered a prospect at several skill positions for the 2009 NFL draft, but was unable to run the 40-yard dash due to an injury sustained in the FCS championship semi-finals. At the James Madison University Pro Day, Landers performed position drills as a defensive back, running back, and wide receiver. After going undrafted, the Tampa Bay Buccaneers invited him to try out as a quarterback at their rookie mini-camp. There, the coaching staff was impressed by Landers' performance, and noted his potential as a cornerback, special teams player, or quarterback in the wildcat formation.

=== Richmond Revolution ===
In the fall of 2009, Landers was signed to the Richmond Revolution, an expansion team in the Indoor Football League. He was released after the 2010 season on December 13, 2010 with much of the team.

=== Richmond Raiders ===
Landers was signed to the Richmond Raiders of the Southern Indoor Football League for the 2011 season.
