= Virginia College Athletic Association =

Defunct NCAA Division III athletic conference

The Virginia College Athletic Association (VCAA), also known as the Virginia Collegiate Athletic Association, was a short-lived intercollegiate athletic conference that existed from 1972 to 1975. As its name suggests, the league's members were located in the state of Virginia. The present-day Old Dominion Athletic Conference subsequently began play in 1976.

== Champions ==
- 1972 – Unknown
- 1973 – Emory & Henry
- 1974 – Unknown
- 1975 – James Madison

== See also ==
- List of defunct college football conferences
