= James Madison Dukes football =

Virginian college American football team

| 2026 James Madison Dukes football team |
- First season: 1972; 54 years ago
- Athletic director: Matt Roan
- Head coach: Billy Napier; 1st season, 8–3 (.727)
- Location: Harrisonburg, Virginia
- Stadium: Bridgeforth Stadium (capacity: 24,877)
- Field: Zane Showker Field
- NCAA division: Division I FBS
- Conference: Sun Belt (American by 2027)
- Division: East
- Colors: Purple and gold
- All-time record: 398–234–4 (.629)
- CFP record: 0–1 (.000)
- Bowl record: 1–1 (.500)

NCAA Division I FCS championships
- 2004, 2016

College Football Playoff appearances
- 2025

Conference championships
- VCAA: 1975 A-10: 1999, 2004 CAA: 2008, 2015, 2016, 2017, 2019, 2021 SBC: 2025

Division championships
- Yankee Mid-Atlantic: 1994 A-10 South: 2006 CAA South: 2020 SBC East: 2022, 2023, 2025
- Rivalries: Old Dominion (rivalry); Liberty (rivalry); Delaware (rivalry); Richmond (rivalry)
- Fight song: "JMU Fight Song"
- Mascot: Duke Dog
- Marching band: Marching Royal Dukes
- Outfitter: Nike
- Website: JMUSports.com

The James Madison Dukes football program represents James Madison University in the sport of American football. The Dukes compete in the NCAA Division I Football Bowl Subdivision (FBS) as a member of the Sun Belt Conference (SBC), beginning play within the conference for the 2022 season. The university first fielded a football team in 1972, and the Dukes play at the on-campus Bridgeforth Stadium in Harrisonburg, Virginia. The Dukes are currently coached by Billy Napier.

The JMU football team has been the centerpiece of JMU sports since the early 2000s. Under former head coach Mickey Matthews the Dukes continued their rise in national prominence, winning the 2004 FCS National Championship. The Dukes won their second national championship in 2016 and finished as national runners-up in 2017 and 2019. In 2021, JMU accepted an invitation to move up to the Football Bowl Subdivision (FBS) and joined the Sun Belt Conference prior to the 2023 football season.

Notable Dukes include Chris Loftus, Charles Haley, one of two players to win five Super Bowl rings and is also an inductee of the College Football Hall of Fame and Pro Football Hall of Fame; Scott Norwood, of the Buffalo Bills; Gary Clark, an All-Pro wide receiver for the Washington Redskins; Arthur Moats, a linebacker for the Buffalo Bills and Pittsburgh Steelers who is known for delivering the sack that led to the end of the record streak of consecutive starts made by Brett Favre in the National Football League (NFL); and Aaron Stinnie, an offensive guard for the New York Giants who won a Super Bowl with the 2021 Tampa Bay Buccaneers.

== History ==
=== Early history (1972–1998) ===
Just five years after (then) Madison College had officially become a coeducational institution, (Note: The school had admitted its first male day students in 1946, but the Virginia government did not officially recognize its coeducational status until 1966.) the Dukes fielded their first football team. Football was the brainchild of Dr. Ronald Carrier, Madison's president at the time, who was attempting to change the psychology of the campus away from an all-women's teachers college. The first game took place on October 7, 1972, against Shepherd College's junior varsity team at Harrisonburg High School. The team consisted of a few dozen walk-ons and was coached by 30-year-old Challace McMillin.

In 1975, the Dukes had their first undefeated season and won the Virginia College Athletic Association title. Two players, Madison Hall of Fame quarterback Les Branich and offensive guard Jeff Adams, played in both the Dukes' only winless season in 1972 and its only undefeated season in 1975.

For the 1980 season, Madison made the jump from NCAA Division III to NCAA Division I-AA where they played as an Independent through 1992. After twelve seasons the Dukes would join the Yankee Conference, which would become the Atlantic 10 Conference in 1997, then finally CAA Football, the legally separate football league operated by the all-sports Colonial Athletic Association (since renamed the Coastal Athletic Association), in 2007.

=== Mickey Matthews era (1999–2013) ===
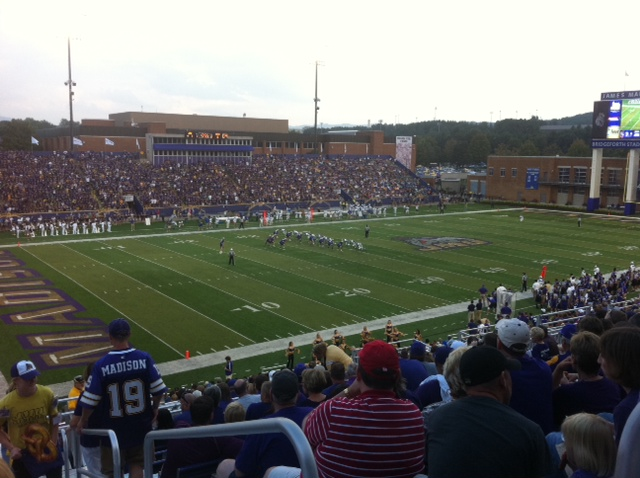
JMU vs. Central Connecticut State, September 10, 2011

The Dukes made the NCAA playoffs in former head coach Mickey Matthews' first year with the team and in 2004, the Dukes won the Division I-AA (now FCS) National Championship behind quarterback Justin Rascati and running back Raymond Hines. They were the first and only team to win three games on the road to advance to the national championship game. They returned to the playoffs in 2006 but suffered an early exit at the hands of Youngstown State University. The Dukes went to the playoffs again in 2007, traveling to Appalachian State in the first round. While down 27–28, JMU lost the game with a fumble on the ASU 8-yard line in the closing seconds of the fourth quarter. In 2008, they posted a 10–1 season record (the lone loss coming in the season opener to FBS team Duke) and received the top seed in the playoffs behind sensational quarterback Rodney Landers. After defeating Wofford and Villanova (for the second time that season), they were defeated by the Montana Grizzlies in the semi-final round after Landers went down with an ankle injury. In the second week of the 2010 season, JMU beat then #13 FBS ranked Virginia Tech in Blacksburg 21-16

A $62 million stadium expansion to Bridgeforth was completed in 2011, adding an upper deck, club seating and 17 private suites. Bridgeforth's official seating capacity is approximately 24,877, and is designed so it can be expanded to seat over 40,000.

Matthews gained his 100th career victory on October 6, 2012, in a 13–10 win over the Towson Tigers.

At the end of the 2013 season, after going 6–6 and missing the FCS playoff for the fourth time in five years, Mickey Matthews was let go as the head football coach after 15 seasons at the helm for the JMU Dukes.

=== Everett Withers era (2014–2015) ===
On December 21, 2013, Everett Withers, assistant head coach and co-defensive coordinator at Ohio State was named as the sixth head coach in the program's history by athletic director, Jeff Bourne. Prior to his work at Ohio State, Withers was interim head coach for North Carolina during the 2011 season after the dismissal of Butch Davis. His first win as interim head coach at North Carolina was against the Mickey Matthews led James Madison Dukes on September 3, 2011. While at JMU Withers compiled a 19–7 overall mark while making playoff appearances in both of his years in Harrisonburg. He also helped JMU receive national attention when ESPN's College GameDay show traveled to Harrisonburg to feature the 2015 Dukes.

=== Mike Houston era (2016–2018) ===
On January 18, 2016, James Madison named Mike Houston as head coach of the Dukes football program. Houston was formerly head coach of the Lenoir-Rhyne Bears (2011–13) and Citadel Bulldogs (2014-15). Houston was very successful at Lenoir-Rhyne claiming three conference championships and an appearance in the NCAA Division II Football National Championship. At The Citadel, Houston led the Bulldogs to their first SoCon conference championship since 1992. In 2016 Houston defeated 4 FCS top 25 teams on the road as he led the Dukes to the 2016 CAA Football title with a 20–7 win over Villanova University gaining the university's first back to back titles. In the 2016 FCS playoff second round, he and the Dukes defeated the University of New Hampshire 55–22. The Dukes then went on to defeat Sam Houston State 65–7 in the NCAA FCS Quarterfinals. In the Semifinals, Mike Houston's Dukes defeated the five-time NCAA Division I FCS champions the North Dakota State University Bison 27–17, giving them the opportunity to face Youngstown State in the National Title Game on January 7, 2017, in Frisco, Texas. JMU won the National Championship in decisive fashion, with a score of 28–14 (Youngstown State scored a garbage time touchdown with seconds left in the game) on a cold, 15 °F afternoon in Frisco, Texas.

On January 7, 2017, JMU faced the Youngstown State Penguins for the 2016 FCS National Championship at Toyota Stadium in Frisco, Texas. JMU got off to a fast start, leading Youngstown 21–0 by the middle of the second quarter. JMU QB Bryan Schor had two quick passing touchdowns and one rushing touchdown by JMU RB Khalid Abdullah got the game started quickly for the Dukes. Youngstown State battled back to score just before halftime to make it a 21–7 game at the half. JMU added another touchdown early in the third quarter extending their lead to 28-7. Youngstown State added a touchdown late in the 4th quarter but the game had already been decided. JMU finished off the game winning their second national championship by a final score of 28-14. JMU QB Bryan Schor threw for 112 yards and 2 touchdowns, JMU RB Khalid Abdullah rushed for over 100 yards and 2 touchdowns and JMU DB Jordan Brown finished with 7 tackles to lead the JMU defensive effort.

The Dukes started their title defense season on September 2, 2017, with a dominating win against Division 1 FBS members East Carolina, winning by a score of 34–14 to claim a victory over a team from college football's highest division for the second time in three seasons. The Dukes went on to finish with a perfect regular season record, including an 8–0 record in CAA Football — becoming the first team since 1977 to go undefeated in back-to-back CAA campaigns. On Sunday November 19, JMU was awarded the #1 seed in the 2017 FCS Playoffs by the Selection Committee. After a first-round bye, JMU faced the Stony Brook Seawolves in the FCS Second Round, winning by a score of 26-7. In the FCS Quarterfinals, the Dukes faced Big Sky member Weber State. Trailing late in the 4th quarter, JMU eventually won the game on a last second field goal, advancing to the FCS semifinals to face South Dakota State, from the Missouri Valley Football Conference. In this game, the Dukes, bolstered by 10 takeaways on defense, cruised to an easy 51–16 victory, and earned a return trip to Frisco, TX to defend their 2016 National Championship. In the Title game, the Dukes were plagued by dropped passes and uncharacteristic turnovers, and fell to the North Dakota State Bison by a score of 17-13.

In 2017, JMU set program and CAA record winning streaks. Before falling to North Dakota State, the Dukes won their previous 26 games, dating back to the 2016 season, the 2nd longest winning streak in FCS history (NDSU- 33 games).

On December 12, 2017, James Madison announced Mike Houston had signed a 10-year contract extension to keep him at the school through the 2027 season.

The Dukes entered the 2018 season ranked second nationally, behind only the defending national champion North Dakota State, and faced NC State to start the 2018 campaign, losing a close game by a score of 24-13. JMU then won its next four games as they held their #2 ranking. The Dukes then had their 19-game home win streak snapped against Elon who was ranked #10 in the country at the time. The Dukes also faced an uncharacteristic loss to New Hampshire later in the season as their record fell to 6-3. JMU won out the rest of the season but failed to win a share of the conference title for the first time since 2014. They earned an at large bid to the NCAA FCS Playoffs and faced Delaware in the First round, winning 20-6. The Dukes then traveled to Colgate in the second round of the playoffs amid rumors of Mike Houstons departure. JMU lost this game on a last second field goal. During the game, starting quarterback for JMU Ben DiNucci threw 5 interceptions and threw for 0 touchdowns as the Dukes lost 20-23. At the end of the season, JMU finished with a 9–4 record.

Following the conclusion of the 2018 season, Mike Houston accepted the position of head coach at East Carolina University.

=== Curt Cignetti era (2019–2023) ===
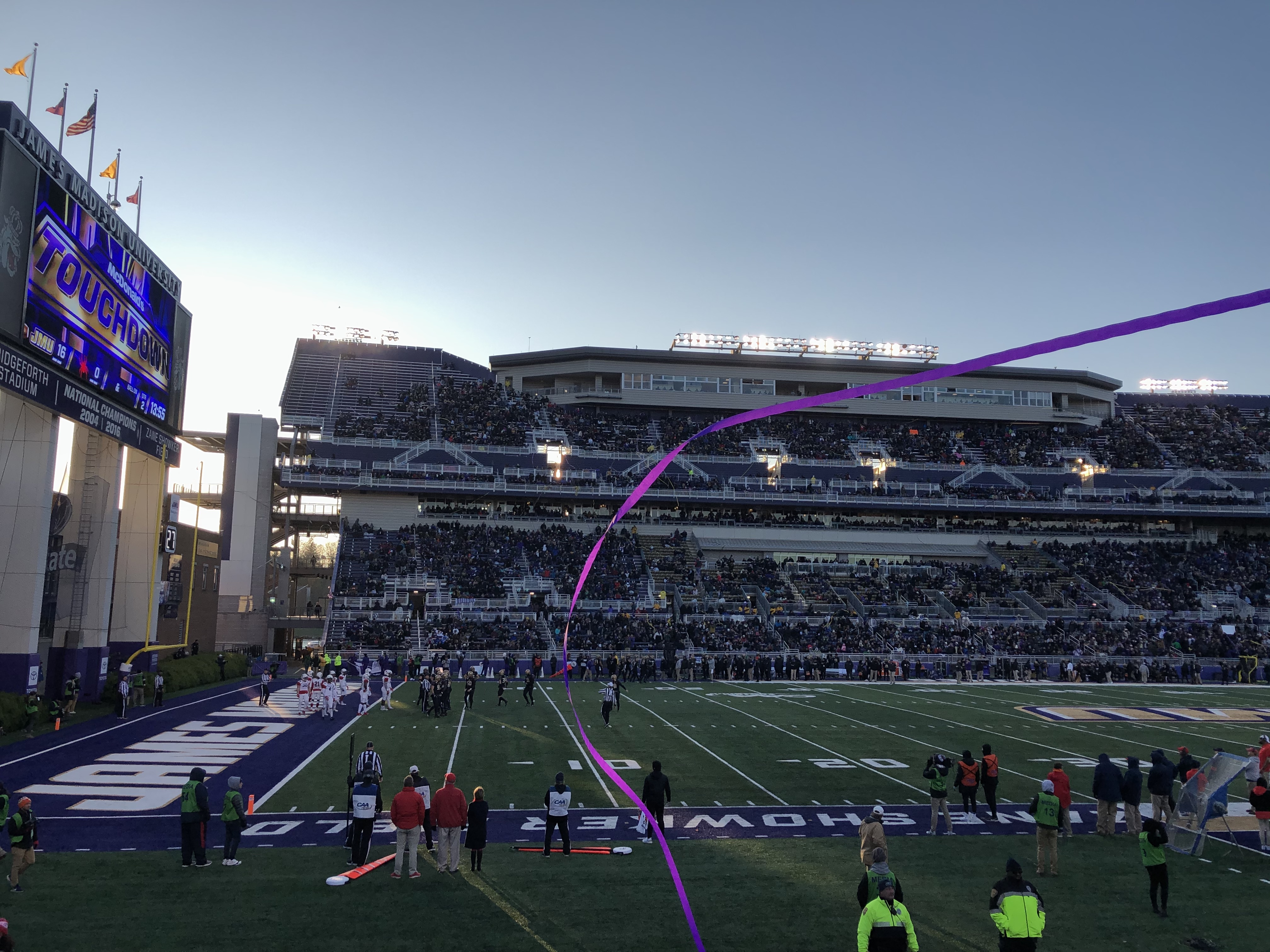
JMU vs. Richmond, November 16, 2019

On December 14, 2018, it was announced that former Elon football head coach Curt Cignetti would be the 8th head coach of James Madison's football program.

The Dukes entered the 2019 season with 19 starters returning and a preseason ranking of #1 but not a consensus #1 as NDSU once again entered the season at #1 throughout most FCS polls.

#2 James Madison came three yards shy of forcing a potential overtime in the NCAA Division I Championship Game, but a late interception sealed a third consecutive national title for #1 North Dakota State in a 28–20 victory for the Bison on Saturday afternoon at Toyota Stadium. The Bison concluded the 2019 season with a perfect 16–0 record, while the Dukes saw their 14-game win streak end, completing the campaign at 14–2. JMU's 2019 senior class finished their careers with the most wins in school history, with 51 victories, and the Dukes are now 2–2 overall in national-title games. JMU also finished 2019 tied for the most wins in a single season, with 14. This matches the 2016 and 2017 seasons. Since 2016, all three meetings with JMU and NDSU have been decided by 10 points or less, a touchdown game in each of the national-title game matchups.

On November 6, 2021, it was announced that the James Madison football program had accepted an invitation to move up to the Football Bowl Subdivision (FBS) and would join the Sun Belt Conference prior to the 2023 football season. In response to this announcement, the all-sports CAA announced that James Madison would be banned from the conference's championships for the remainder of their time in the conference. This ban did not apply to football because CAA Football had no such provision in its bylaws.

Subsequently, James Madison announced they had finalized their departure from the CAA on February 2, 2022, and would join the FBS and the Sun Belt for the 2022–23 season.

JMU's arrival in FBS made the Dukes the second program, after UCF, to have played at all four current levels of NCAA football.

On October 9, 2022, the Dukes became the first first-year FBS program to be ranked in the AP Top 25, ranked 25. The Dukes finished the 2022 season with an 8–3 record and tied for the best record in the Sun Belt East.

In November 2023, the Dukes earned their highest ranking in the AP poll, ranked 18. On November 18, James Madison University hosted ESPN's College Gameday for the first time as an FBS school (third time overall). The Dukes finished the regular season with an 11–1 record and received an invitation to play Air Force in the Lockheed Martin Armed Forces Bowl, falling to the Falcons 31–21 in the team's first bowl game appearance.

On November 30, 2023, Cignetti departed James Madison University to become the head coach at Indiana.

=== Bob Chesney era (2024–2025) ===
On December 7, 2023, Bob Chesney was hired from Holy Cross. The Dukes went 9–4 in his first season at the helm, the season culminating in the program's first bowl win against Western Kentucky at the Boca Raton Bowl. In his second year, he would lead the Dukes to a 11–1 record, with their only loss being against Louisville. On December 7, 2025, the Dukes won their first Sun Belt Championship against Troy at Bridgeforth Stadium. With the victory, the Dukes were awarded their first appearance in the College Football Playoff. Bob Chesney accepted the head coaching job at UCLA after the SBC championship game, but remained with JMU through the Dukes' loss to Oregon in the CFP first round.

=== Billy Napier era (2026-Current) ===
On December 6th, 2025, James Madison hired Billy Napier to take on the head coaching job after previous head coach, Bob Chesney left for UCLA. Napier has led the dukes to a 7-1 start in the 26-27 season so far, their only loss coming from the Appalachian State Mountaineers on October 22nd where they lost in OT 34-31. The Dukes subsequently suffered another overtime defeat against Troy, losing 24–21. The consecutive losses dropped James Madison's record from 7–0 to 7–2. The Dukes fight back the following week beating Southern Miss 54-23. Again, the dukes fall the following week to UConn 46-22 causing the once 7-0 dukes to drop to 8-3. Meaning they have gone 1-3 in the last four games.

== Current coaching staff ==
| Name | Position | Year joined | Alma mater |
|---|---|---|---|
| Billy Napier | Head coach | 2025 | Furman (2002) |
| Cam Aiken | Offensive coordinator/quarterbacks | 2025 | Clemson (2011) |
| Rob Wenger | Special Teams coordinator/tight ends | 2026 | Colgate University (2008) |
| Robert Bala | Defensive coordinator | 2025 | Southern Utah University (2008) |
| Chris Smith | Offensive line/Run game coordinator | 2024 | Holy Cross (2009) |
| Anthony DiMichele | Safeties/Recruiting coordinator | 2024 | Holy Cross (2011) |
| Eddie Whitley Jr. | Cornerbacks | 2020 | Virginia Tech (2012) |
| Sam Daniels | Defensive line | 2024 | James Madison (2010) |
| David Sims Jr. | Running backs | 2024 | Georgia Tech (2013) |
| Justin Harper | Wide receivers | 2024 | Virginia Tech (2007) |
| Dave Plungas | Linebackers | 2025 | Albany (2012) |
| Chris Zarkoskie | Senior offensive analyst | 2024 | New Hampshire (2013) |
| Matt Moran | Senior special teams analyst | 2024 | Bowdoin (2010) |
| Mike Cordova | Graduate assistant (offense) | 2024 | Stonehill (2019) |
| Nick Sproles | Graduate assistant (offense) | 2024 | Florida (2020) |
| Jason Novak | Director of strength and conditioning | 2024 | Stephen F. Austin State (1998) |
| Paul Cipriano | Associate director of strength and conditioning | 2024 | North Central (2013) |
| Kyle Barnes | Senior defensive analyst | 2024 | Assumption (2018) |
| Justice Seales | Graduate assistant (defense) | 2024 | Marist (2020) |

== Conference affiliations ==
- 1972–1973: Independent
- 1974–1975: Virginia Collegiate Athletic Association
- 1976: NCAA Division II Independent
- 1977–1978: NCAA Division III Independent
- 1979: NCAA Division II Independent
- 1980–1992: NCAA Division I-AA Independent
- 1993–1996: Yankee Conference
- 1997–2006: Atlantic 10 Conference
- 2007–2021: CAA Football
- 2022–2026: Sun Belt Conference
- 2027–future: American Conference

== Rivalries ==
=== Old Dominion ===
On October 26, 2022, the JMU Dukes and in-state rival Old Dominion Monarchs announced the official beginning of the "Royal Rivalry". As the Virginia-based schools within the Sun Belt Conference, they will compete for an all-sports trophy that contains a football component and draws its name from the royal inspiration of both schools' mascots.

JMU leads the football series at 5–2, winning the most recent meeting 46-20 on September 26, 2026.

=== Liberty ===
James Madison maintains a football rivalry with the Liberty Flames which began in 1980. The teams played almost every year from 1980 to 1992 and then again from 2000 to 2014. The rivalry was renewed in 2025, marked by the recent expansion of the game series where the teams are set to play each other through to 2040, marking the longest contracted game series in FBS football. JMU won the most recent meeting 20–13 on September 5, 2026. The Dukes have more wins in the rivalry, having won 14 of the 19 games.

=== Delaware ===
James Madison and Delaware regularly played as conference opponents in the CAA, with the first matchup occurring in 1983. During the divisional era of the CAA, the game was played as an annual CAA South divisional matchup. As both teams had sustained success, games between the two schools often had conference and even national implications, and the series quickly grew into a rivalry as a result.

During this period, the teams combined for three FCS national championships (Delaware in 2003, James Madison in 2004 and 2016), four national runners-up (Delaware in 2007 and 2010, James Madison in 2017 and 2019), and fifteen conference championships (Delaware in 1995, 1997, 2000, 2003, 2004, 2010 and 2020, and James Madison in 1999, 2004, 2008, 2015, 2016, 2017, 2019, and 2021).

In 2020, as a result of the COVID-19 pandemic, the CAA split into divisions for the first time since 2009. Delaware was placed into the large North division, whereas JMU was placed in the four-team South division. With no crossover games, the rivalry was paused for this season. Despite this, the rivalry was only intensified, as both James Madison and Delaware went undefeated, and with no championship game, the CAA chose to award Delaware the conference title (as they had played in the North Division which held the vast majority of the conference's teams and therefore played not only a harder schedule but more unique conference opponents) giving them the automatic bid into the FCS Playoffs. (JMU was given an honorary "CAA South" title, as well as ultimately being selected as an at-large team into the FCS Playoffs.) In the playoffs, both Delaware and James Madison won two games each before being eliminated in the semi-finals by Sam Houston and Montana State.

When James Madison left the CAA in 2021 to join the FBS and the Sun Belt Conference, the rivalry was put on hold.

In 2023, it was announced that Delaware too would leave the CAA to join the FBS, with them joining Conference USA in 2025. With both teams now back in the same football subdivision, a four-game non-conference series was scheduled, starting in 2027.

In the 2025 release of the annual college football video game franchise, EA Sports College Football 26, the matchup was listed as a rivalry, Delaware's only rivalry in the game.

=== Other rivals ===
Other rivals of the Dukes include in-state (FCS) schools Richmond and William & Mary, long-time former instate conference opponents in the CAA.

The series with Richmond was home to many pivotal matchups over the years, as both teams had significant success in the FCS during the 2010s. The matchup was first held in 1981, and was the host of College Gameday in 2005, before being cancelled after the 2021 meeting due to JMU's move to FBS.

== Championships ==
=== National championships ===
James Madison has won two national championships, with both occurring during their time in NCAA Division I-AA/FCS.

| Year | Coach | Selectors | Record | Bowl |
|---|---|---|---|---|
| 2004 | Mickey Matthews | Division I-AA Playoffs | 13–2 | Won Division I-AA Championship Game (31–21 over Montana) |
| 2016 | Mike Houston | Won Division I FCS Playoffs | 14–1 | Won NCAA Division I Football Championship Game (28–14 over Youngstown State) |

=== Conference championships ===
James Madison has won ten conference championships, six outright.

| Year | Coach | Conference | Overall record | Conference record |
|---|---|---|---|---|
| 1975 | Challace McMillin | Virginia Collegiate Athletic Association | 9–0–1 | 5–0 |
| 1999† | Mickey Matthews | Atlantic 10 Conference | 8–4 | 7–1 |
| 2004† | Mickey Matthews | Atlantic 10 Conference | 13–2 | 7–1 |
| 2008 | Mickey Matthews | CAA Football | 12–2 | 8–0 |
| 2015† | Everett Withers | CAA Football | 9–3 | 6–2 |
| 2016 | Mike Houston | CAA Football | 14–1 | 8–0 |
| 2017 | Mike Houston | CAA Football | 14–1 | 8–0 |
| 2019 | Curt Cignetti | CAA Football | 14–2 | 8–0 |
| 2021† | Curt Cignetti | CAA Football | 12–2 | 7–1 |
| 2025 | Bob Chesney | Sun Belt Conference | 12–2 | 8–0 |

† Co-champions

=== Division championships ===
James Madison has won six division championships, three each at the FCS and FBS levels.

| Year | Division | Coach | Overall record | Conference record | CG result |
|---|---|---|---|---|---|
| 1994 | Yankee Mid-Atlantic | Rip Scherer | 10–3 | 6–2 | N/A |
| 2006 | Atlantic 10 South | Mickey Matthews | 9–3 | 7–1 | N/A |
| 2020 | CAA South | Curt Cignetti | 7–1 | 3–0 | N/A |
| 2022 | Sun Belt East | Curt Cignetti | 8–3 | 6–2 | Ineligible |
| 2023 | Sun Belt East | Curt Cignetti | 11–2 | 7–1 | Ineligible |
| 2025 | Sun Belt East | Bob Chesney | 12–2 | 8–0 | Defeated Troy 31–14 |

== Postseason results ==
=== Bowl games ===
| Season | Bowl | Opponent | Result |
|---|---|---|---|
| 2023 | Armed Forces Bowl | Air Force | L 21–31 |
| 2024 | Boca Raton Bowl | Western Kentucky | W 27–17 |
| 2025 | CFP First Round† | Oregon | L 34–51 |

† College Football Playoff game

=== FCS Playoffs ===
The Dukes made eighteen appearances in the Division I-AA/FCS Playoffs. Their combined record was 24–16. They were Division I-AA/FCS national champions in 2004 and 2016 and national runners-up in 2017 and 2019.

| Season | Round | Opponent | Result |
|---|---|---|---|
| 1987 | First Round | Marshall | L 12–41 |
| 1991 | First Round; Quarterfinals | Delaware; Samford | W 42–35; L 21–24 |
| 1994 | First Round; Quarterfinals | Troy State; Marshall | W 45–26; L 21–28 |
| 1995 | First Round | Appalachian State | L 24–31 |
| 1999 | First Round | Troy State | L 7–27 |
| 2004 | First Round; Quarterfinals; Semifinals; National Championship Game | Lehigh; Furman; William & Mary; Montana | W 14–13; W 14–13; W 48–34; W 31–21 |
| 2006 | First Round | Youngstown State | L 31–35 |
| 2007 | First Round | Appalachian State | L 27–28 |
| 2008 | First Round; Quarterfinals; Semifinals | Wofford; Villanova; Montana | W 38–35; W 31–27; L 27–35 |
| 2011 | First Round; Second Round | Eastern Kentucky; North Dakota State | W 20–17; L 14–26 |
| 2014 | First Round | Liberty | L 21–26 |
| 2015 | Second Round | Colgate | L 38–44 |
| 2016 | Second Round; Quarterfinals; Semifinals; National Championship Game | New Hampshire; Sam Houston State; North Dakota State; Youngstown State | W 55–22; W 65–7; W 27–17; W 28–14 |
| 2017 | Second Round; Quarterfinals; Semifinals; National Championship Game | Stony Brook; Weber State; South Dakota State; North Dakota State | W 26–7; W 31–28; W 51–16; L 13–17 |
| 2018 | First Round; Second Round | Delaware; Colgate | W 20–6; L 20–23 |
| 2019 | Second Round; Quarterfinals; Semifinals; National Championship Game | Monmouth; Northern Iowa; Weber State; North Dakota State | W 66–21; W 17–0; W 30–14; L 20–28 |
| 2020 | First Round; Quarterfinals; Semifinals | VMI; North Dakota; Sam Houston State | W 31–24; W 34–21; L 35–38 |
| 2021 | Second Round; Quarterfinals; Semifinals | Southeastern Louisiana; Montana; North Dakota State | W 59–20; W 28–6; L 14–20 |

== Head coaches ==
| Head coach | Years | Season(s) | W-L-T | Pct. |
|---|---|---|---|---|
| Challace McMillin | 1972–1984 | 13 | 67–60–2 | .527 |
| Joe Purzycki | 1985–1990 | 6 | 34–30–2 | .530 |
| Rip Scherer | 1991–1994 | 4 | 29–19 | .604 |
| Alex Wood | 1995–1998 | 4 | 23–22 | .511 |
| Mickey Matthews | 1999–2013 | 15 | 109–71 | .606 |
| Everett Withers | 2014–2015 | 2 | 18–7 | .720 |
| Mike Houston | 2016–2018 | 3 | 37–6 | .860 |
| Curt Cignetti | 2019–2023 | 5 | 52–9 | .852 |
| Damian Wroblewski | 2023 (interim) | 1 | 0–1 | .000 |
| Bob Chesney | 2024–2025 | 2 | 21–6 | .778 |
| Billy Napier | 2026–present | 1 | 8-3 | .727 |

| Totals | Coaches | Seasons | Wins | Losses | Ties | Pct. |
|---|---|---|---|---|---|---|
| 1972–2026 | 11 | 55 | 395 | 230 | 4 | .628 |

== Future non-conference opponents ==
Announced schedules as of May 22, 2026

| 2026 | 2027 | 2028 | 2029 | 2030 | 2031 | 2032 | 2033 | 2034 | 2035 | 2036 | 2037 | 2038 | 2039 | 2040 |
|---|---|---|---|---|---|---|---|---|---|---|---|---|---|---|
| Liberty | Duquesne | Delaware | Central Connecticut | at UNLV | at North Carolina | at Liberty | Liberty | Miami (OH) | Ohio | | Liberty | at Liberty | Liberty | at Liberty |
| Wagner | at Maryland | HCU | at UCF | Akron | Liberty | Delaware | at Miami (OH) | at Liberty | | | | | | |
| at San Diego State | at Delaware | at Ohio | at Akron | Norfolk State | at Delaware | | | | | | | | | |
| at UConn | UNLV | at Virginia | Charlotte | | | | | | | | | | | |
