= 2013 NFL draft =

General information
- Date: April 25–27, 2013
- Location: Radio City Music Hall in New York City, New York
- Networks: ESPN, NFL Network

Overview
- 254 total selections in 7 rounds
- League: NFL
- First selection: Eric Fisher, OT; Kansas City Chiefs
- Mr. Irrelevant: Justice Cunningham, TE; Indianapolis Colts
- Most selections (11): Green Bay Packers; San Francisco 49ers Seattle Seahawks
- Fewest selections (5): Carolina Panthers; Cleveland Browns; New Orleans Saints

The 2013 NFL draft was the 78th annual meeting of National Football League (NFL) franchises to select newly eligible football players. The draft, which is officially called the "NFL Player Selection Meeting", was held at Radio City Music Hall in New York City on April 25 through April 27.

Eric Fisher was chosen first overall by the Kansas City Chiefs, becoming the fourth offensive tackle ever to be selected with the top pick since the first common draft in 1967. Players who attended high school in 39 of the 50 states were selected in this draft; Florida and California led with 27 draftees each. South Carolina contributed the most drafted players on a per capita basis with 13 players, or one of every 355,798 residents of the state. Among colleges, Florida State led with 11 players selected.

A record 11 players from countries other than the United States were selected (Ghanaians Ezekiel Ansah and Edmund Kugbila, Tongan Star Lotulelei, German Björn Werner, Englishman Menelik Watson, Estonian Margus Hunt, Liberian Sio Moore, Jamaican Trevardo Williams, Australian Jesse Williams, Canadian Luke Willson and Zimbabwean Stansly Maponga), breaking the record set by the 2012 NFL draft. Meanwhile, nine offensive linemen were selected in the first round which ties a record previously set in 1968.

This is also the last time where Roger Goodell announces 3rd round picks.

The following is the breakdown of the 254 players selected by position:

- 30 defensive ends
- 29 cornerbacks
- 27 wide receivers
- 27 linebackers
- 24 running backs
- 23 safeties
- 19 defensive tackles
- 18 guards
- 18 offensive tackles
- 16 tight ends
- 12 quarterbacks
- 4 centers
- 3 fullbacks
- 2 placekickers
- 2 punters

== Early entrants ==
A record 73 underclassmen forfeited any remaining NCAA eligibility they may have been eligible for and declared themselves available to be selected in the draft. Of these, 52 (71.2%) were drafted.

== Determination of draft order ==
The draft order is based generally on each team's record from the previous season, with teams which qualified for the postseason selecting after those which failed to make the playoffs.

== Player selections ==
*	compensatory selection
†	Pro Bowler (Note: Players are identified as a Pro Bowler if they were selected for the Pro Bowl at any time in their career.)

Positions key
Offense	Defense	Special teams
QB — Quarterback; RB — Running back; FB — Fullback; WR — Wide receiver; TE — Tight end; OL — Offensive lineman; T — Tackle; G — Guard; C — Center	DL — Defensive lineman; DT — Defensive tackle (Note: Includes nose tackle (NT)); DE — Defensive end; EDGE — Edge rusher; LB — Linebacker (Note: Includes middle linebacker (MLB/MIKE), weakside linebacker (WILL), strongside linebacker (SAM), off-ball linebacker, and outside linebacker (OLB)); DB — Defensive back; CB — Cornerback; S — Safety (Note: Includes free safety (FS) and strong safety (SS))	K — Kicker (Note: Also known as a placekicker (PK)); P — Punter; LS — Long snapper; RS — Return specialist (Note: Includes kickoff and punt returners)

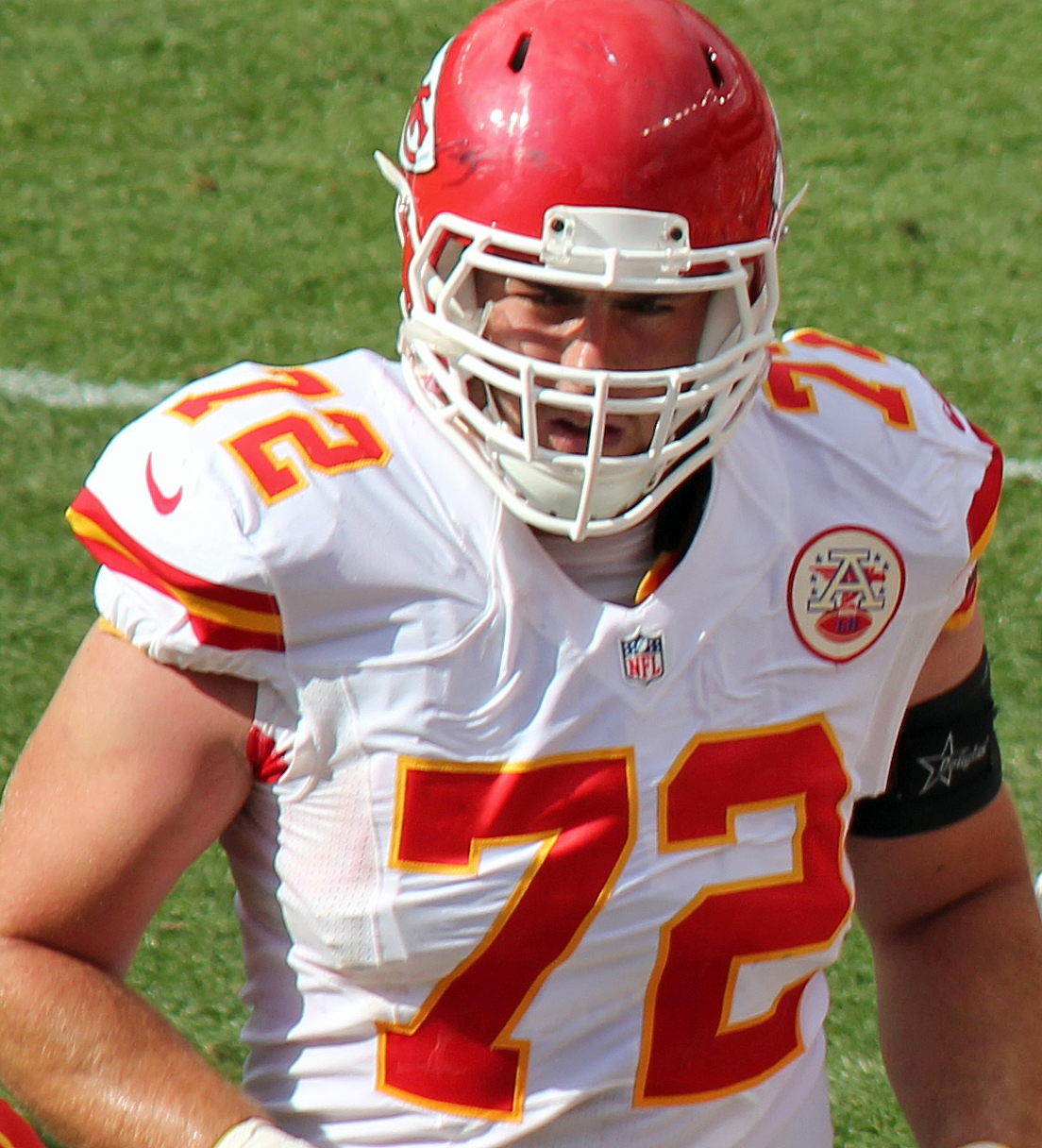
Eric Fisher, selected first overall by the Chiefs, is a two-time Pro Bowl selection.

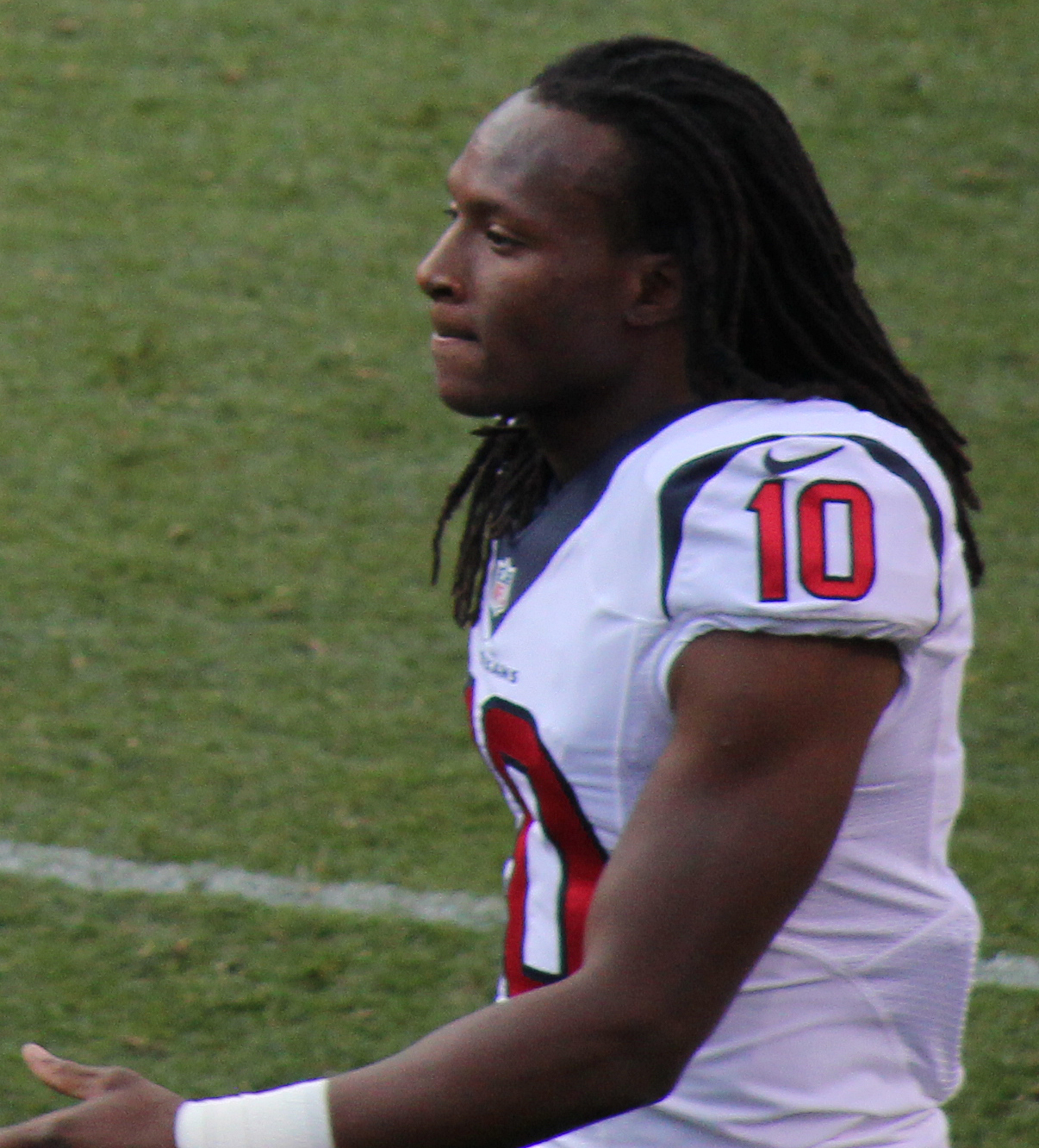
3-time All-Pro receiver DeAndre Hopkins, taken 27th overall by Houston

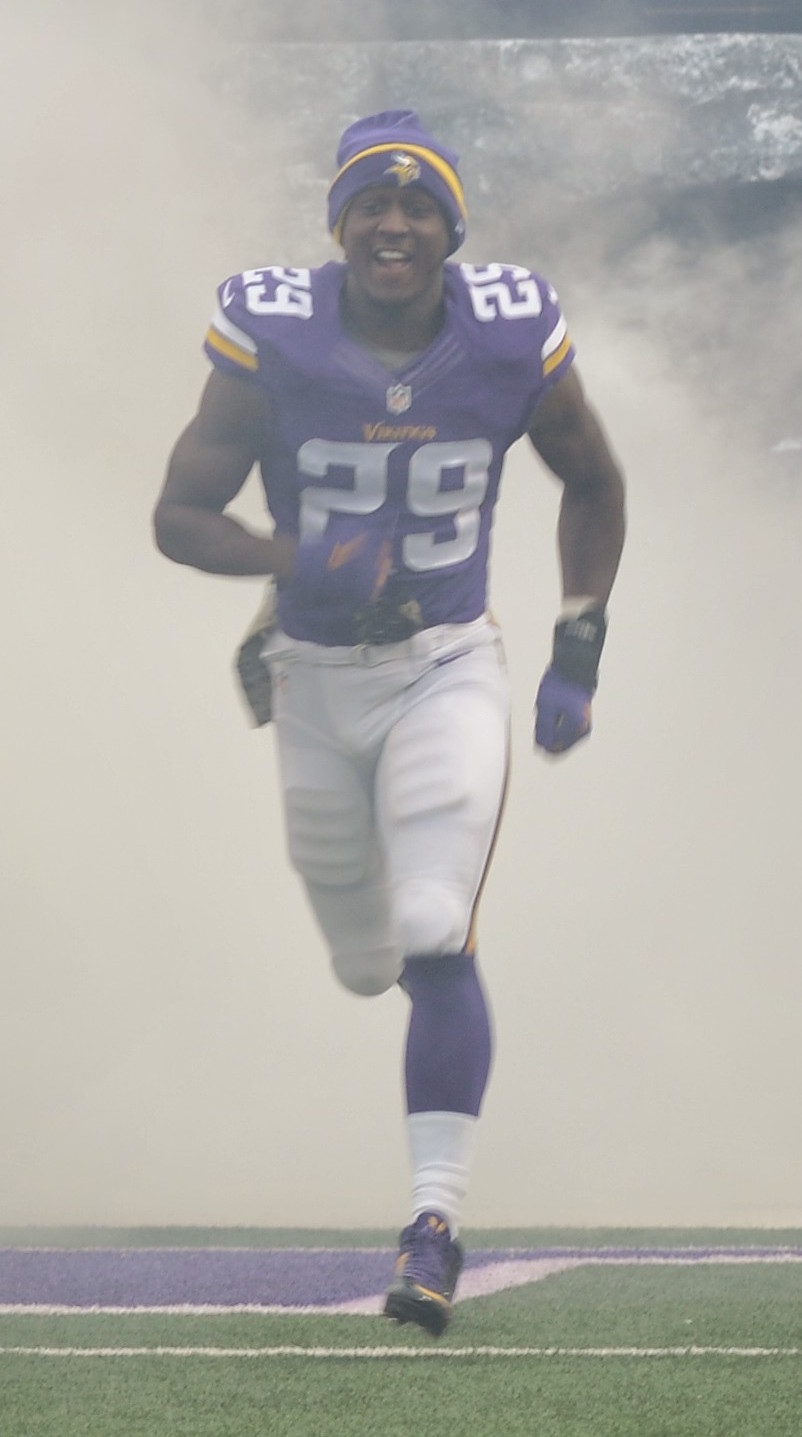
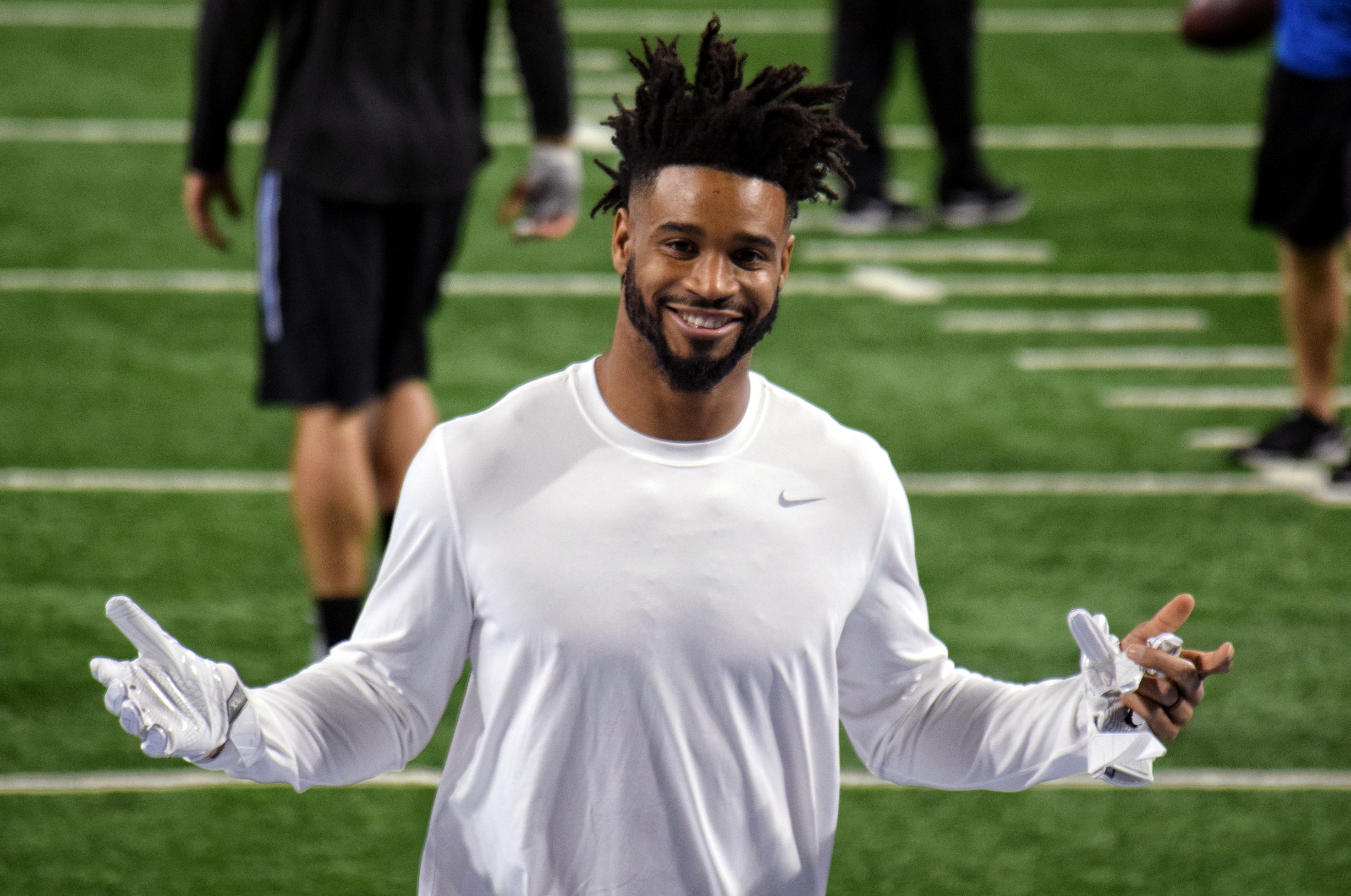
Cornerbacks Xavier Rhodes (25th overall by Minnesota) and Darius Slay (36th overall by Detroit) have both been named to multiple Pro Bowls.

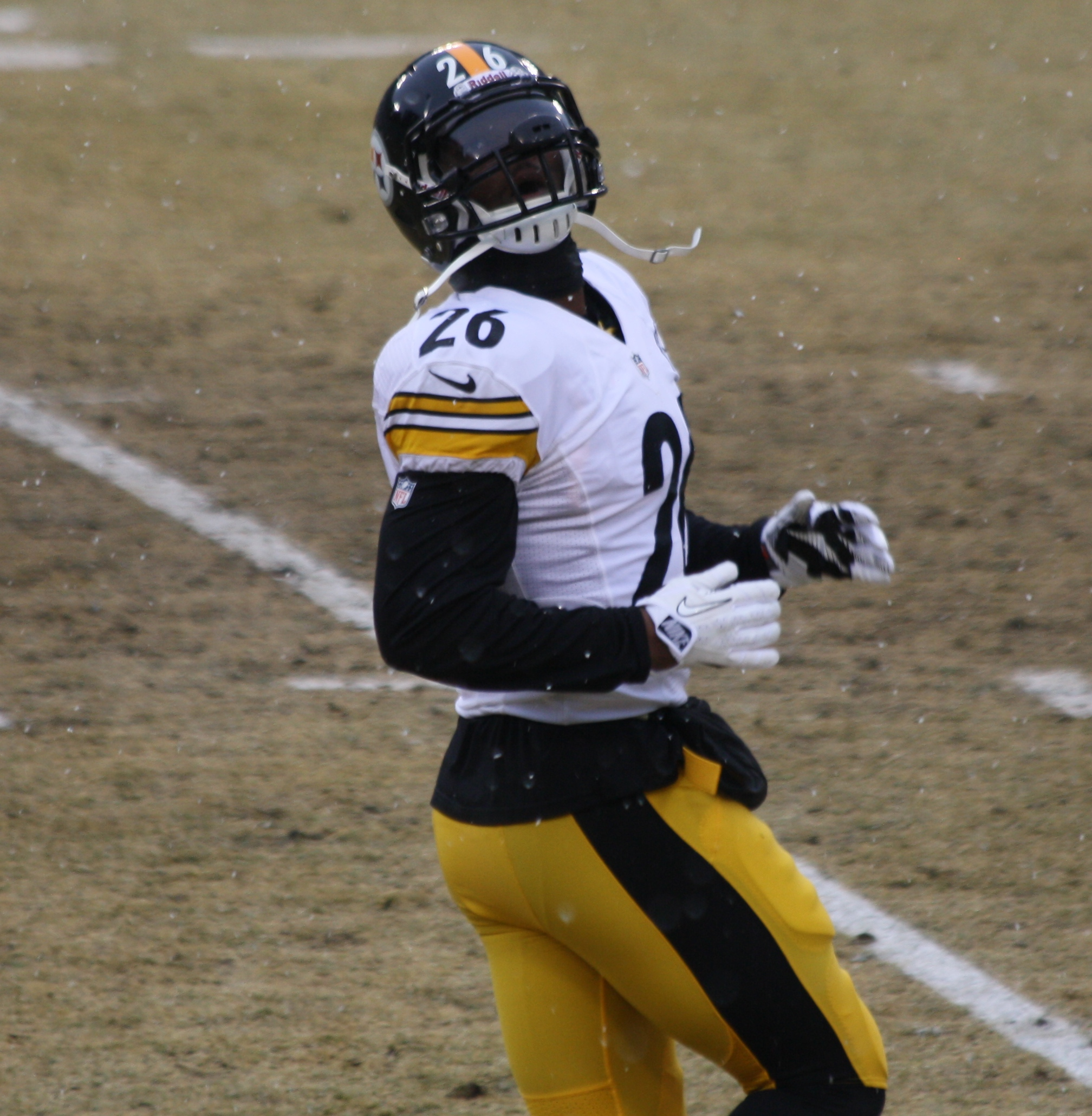
Running back Le'Veon Bell, taken in the 2nd round by Pittsburgh, holds several franchise rushing records, as well as being selected to 3 Pro Bowls

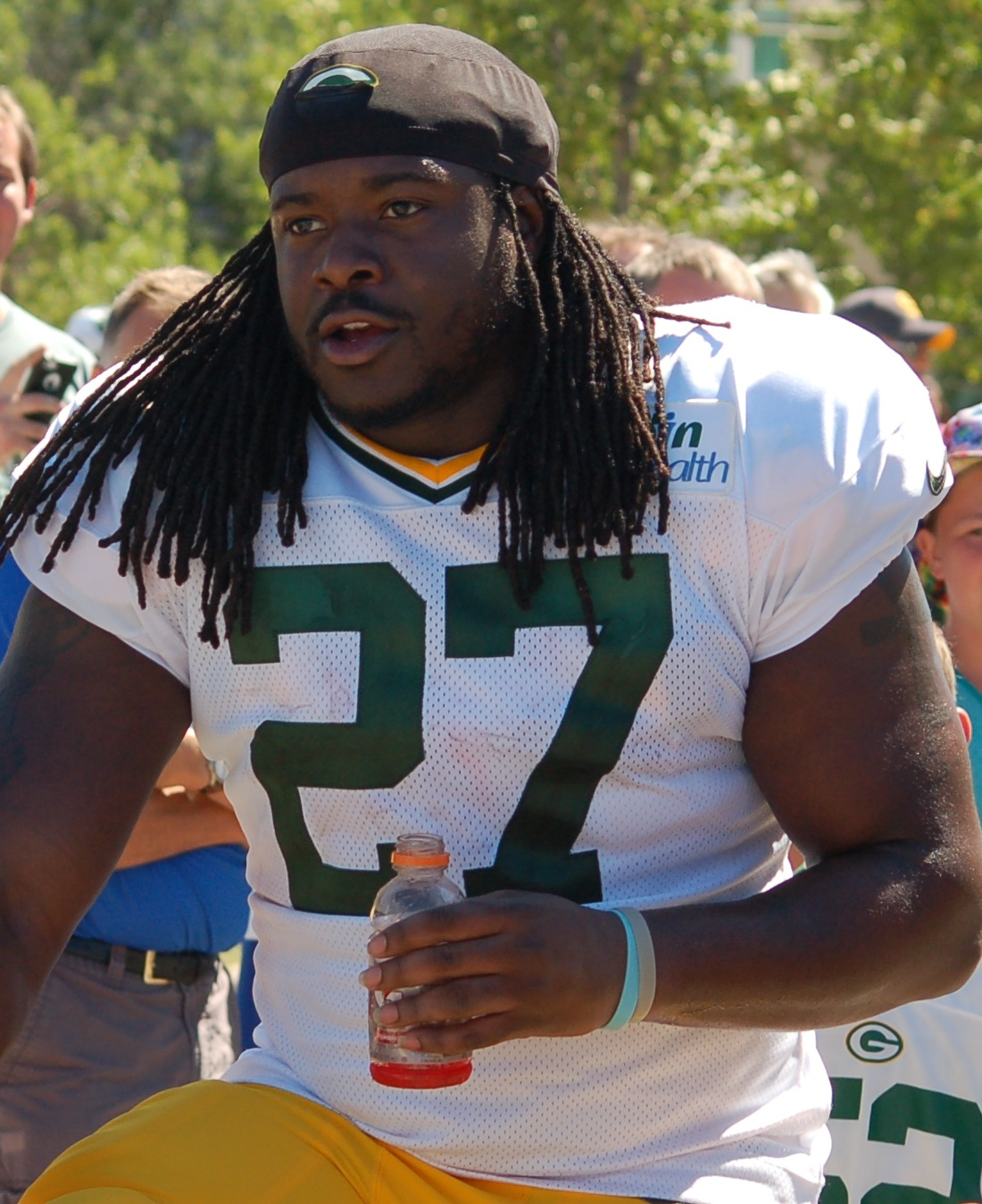
Eddie Lacy, selected in the 2nd round by Green Bay, was named to the Pro Bowl and the NFL Offensive Rookie of the Year

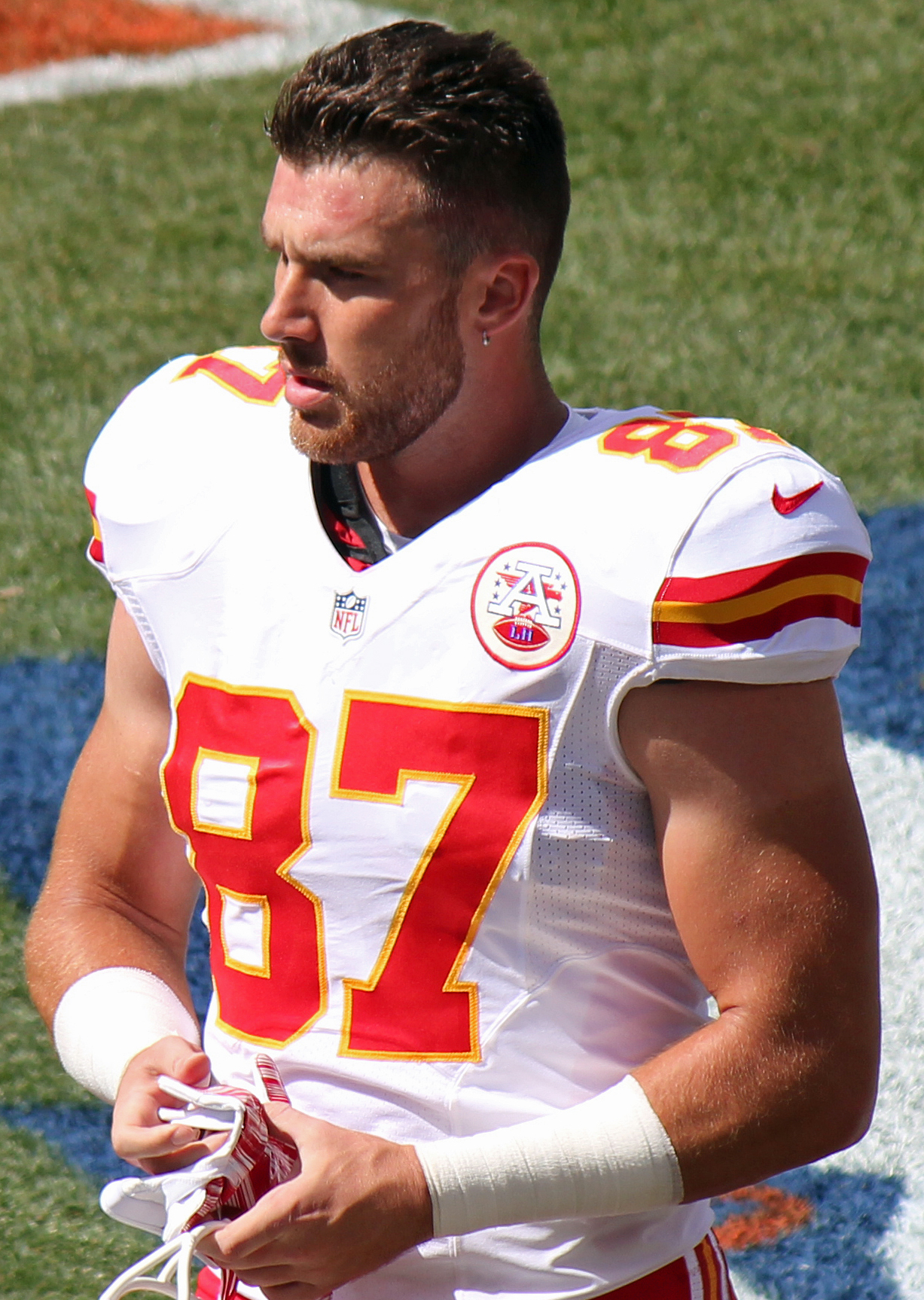
Tight end Travis Kelce, taken in the 3rd round by Kansas City, is an 8-time Pro Bowler, 4-time All Pro, and 3-time Super Bowl champion

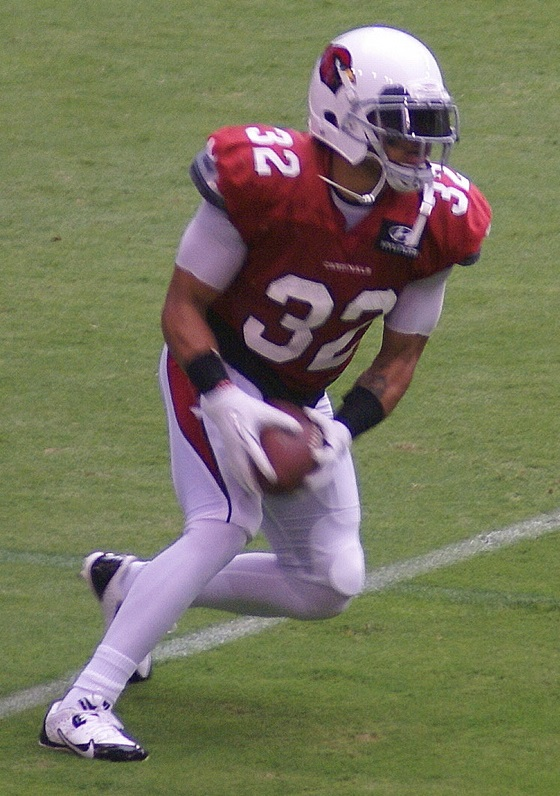
Safety Tyrann Mathieu, taken in the 3rd round by Arizona, was named to the NFL 2010s All-Decade Team

Rnd.	Pick	Team	Player	Pos.	College	Notes
1	1	Kansas City Chiefs	Eric Fisher ^{†}	T	Central Michigan	
1	2	Jacksonville Jaguars	Luke Joeckel	T	Texas A&M	
1	3	Miami Dolphins	Dion Jordan	DE	Oregon	from Oakland (Note: No. 3: Oakland → Miami (D). Oakland traded a first-round selection (3rd overall) to Miami in exchange for first- and second-round selections (12th and 42nd overall).)
1	4	Philadelphia Eagles	Lane Johnson ^{†}	T	Oklahoma	
1	5	Detroit Lions	Ezekiel Ansah ^{†}	DE	BYU	
1	6	Cleveland Browns	Barkevious Mingo	DE	LSU	
1	7	Arizona Cardinals	Jonathan Cooper	G	North Carolina	
1	8	St. Louis Rams	Tavon Austin	WR	West Virginia	from Buffalo (Note: No. 8: Buffalo → St. Louis (D). Buffalo traded first- and third-round selections (8th and 71st overall) to St. Louis in exchange for first-, second-, third- and seventh-round selections (16th, 46th, 78th and 222nd overall).)
1	9	New York Jets	Dee Milliner	CB	Alabama	
1	10	Tennessee Titans	Chance Warmack	G	Alabama	
1	11	San Diego Chargers	D. J. Fluker	T	Alabama	
1	12	Oakland Raiders	D. J. Hayden	CB	Houston	from Miami (Note: No. 12: Miami → Oakland (D). See Round 1: Oakland → Miami.)
1	13	New York Jets	Sheldon Richardson ^{†}	DT	Missouri	from Tampa Bay (Note: No. 13: Tampa Bay → NY Jets (PD). Tampa Bay traded a first-round selection (13th overall) and a conditional 2014 mid-round selection to the NY Jets in exchange for CB Darrelle Revis. The conditional pick became Tampa's fourth-round selection, rather than a third-rounder, when Tampa Bay released Revis prior to the start of the 2014 league year in March 2014.)
1	14	Carolina Panthers	Star Lotulelei	DT	Utah	
1	15	New Orleans Saints	Kenny Vaccaro	S	Texas	
1	16	Buffalo Bills	EJ Manuel	QB	Florida State	from St. Louis (Note: No. 16: St. Louis → Buffalo (D). See Round 1: Buffalo → St. Louis.)
1	17	Pittsburgh Steelers	Jarvis Jones	LB	Georgia	
1	18	San Francisco 49ers	Eric Reid ^{†}	S	LSU	from Dallas (Note: No. 18: Dallas → San Francisco (D). Dallas traded a first-round selection (18th overall) to San Francisco in exchange for first- and third-round selections (31st and 74th overall).)
1	19	New York Giants	Justin Pugh	T	Syracuse	
1	20	Chicago Bears	Kyle Long ^{†}	G	Oregon	
1	21	Cincinnati Bengals	Tyler Eifert ^{†}	TE	Notre Dame	
1	22	Atlanta Falcons	Desmond Trufant ^{†}	CB	Washington	from Washington via St. Louis (Note: No. 22: Washington → St. Louis → Atlanta. Multiple trades: Washington → St. Louis (PD). Washington traded a first-round selection (22nd overall), 2012 first- and second-round selections and a 2014 first-round selection to St. Louis in exchange for a 2012 first-round selection. St. Louis → Atlanta (D). St. Louis traded a first-round selection (22nd overall) and a 2015 seventh-round selection to Atlanta in exchange for first-, third- and sixth-round selections (30th, 92nd and 198th overall).)
1	23	Minnesota Vikings	Sharrif Floyd	DT	Florida	
1	24	Indianapolis Colts	Björn Werner	DE	Florida State	
1	25	Minnesota Vikings	Xavier Rhodes ^{†}	CB	Florida State	from Seattle (Note: No. 25: Seattle → Minnesota (PD). Seattle traded first- and seventh-round selections (25th and 214th overall), and a 2014 third-round selection to Minnesota in exchange for WR Percy Harvin.)
1	26	Green Bay Packers	Datone Jones	DE	UCLA	
1	27	Houston Texans	DeAndre Hopkins ^{†}	WR	Clemson	
1	28	Denver Broncos	Sylvester Williams	DT	North Carolina	
1	29	Minnesota Vikings	Cordarrelle Patterson ^{†}	WR	Tennessee	from New England (Note: No. 29: New England → Minnesota (D). New England traded a first-round selection (29th overall) to Minnesota in exchange for second-, third-, fourth- and seventh-round selections (52nd, 83rd, 102nd and 229th overall).)
1	30	St. Louis Rams	Alec Ogletree	LB	Georgia	from Atlanta (Note: No. 30: Atlanta → St. Louis (D). See Round 1: St. Louis → Atlanta.)
1	31	Dallas Cowboys	Travis Frederick ^{†}	C	Wisconsin	from San Francisco (Note: No. 31: San Francisco → Dallas (D). See Round 1: Dallas → San Francisco.)
1	32	Baltimore Ravens	Matt Elam	S	Florida	
2	33	Jacksonville Jaguars	Johnathan Cyprien	S	FIU	
2	34	Tennessee Titans	Justin Hunter	WR	Tennessee	from Kansas City via San Francisco (Note: No. 34: Kansas City → San Francisco → Tennessee. Multiple trades: Kansas City → San Francisco (PD). Kansas City traded a second-round selection and a conditional 2014 third-round selection to San Francisco in exchange for QB Alex Smith; the 2014 selection became a second-rounder after Kansas City won a minimum of eight games in the 2013 season. San Francisco → Tennessee (D). San Francisco traded a second-round selection (34th overall) to Tennessee in exchange for second- and seventh-round selections (40th and 216th overall), and a 2014 third-round selection.)
2	35	Philadelphia Eagles	Zach Ertz ^{†}	TE	Stanford	
2	36	Detroit Lions	Darius Slay ^{†}	CB	Mississippi State	
2	37	Cincinnati Bengals	Giovani Bernard	RB	North Carolina	from Oakland (Note: No. 37: Oakland → Cincinnati (PD). Oakland traded a second-round selection (37th overall) and a 2012 first-round selection to Cincinnati in exchange for QB Carson Palmer.)
2	38	San Diego Chargers	Manti Te'o	LB	Notre Dame	from Arizona (Note: No. 38: Arizona → San Diego (D). Arizona traded a second-round selection (38th overall) to San Diego in exchange for second- and fourth-round selections (45th and 110th overall).)
2	–	Cleveland Browns	Selection forfeited during the 2012 supplemental draft. (Note: Cleveland forfeited its second-round selection after selecting WR Josh Gordon in the second round of the 2012 supplemental draft.)			
2	39	New York Jets	Geno Smith ^{†}	QB	West Virginia	
2	40	San Francisco 49ers	Tank Carradine	DE	Florida State	from Tennessee (Note: No. 40: Tennessee → San Francisco (D). See Round 2: San Francisco → Tennessee.)
2	41	Buffalo Bills	Robert Woods	WR	USC	
2	42	Oakland Raiders	Menelik Watson	T	Florida State	from Miami (Note: No. 42: Miami → Oakland (D). See Round 1: Oakland → Miami.)
2	43	Tampa Bay Buccaneers	Johnthan Banks	CB	Mississippi State	
2	44	Carolina Panthers	Kawann Short ^{†}	DT	Purdue	
2	–	New Orleans Saints	selection forfeited (Note: New Orleans forfeited its second-round selection as part of the punishment for the team's 2012 bounty scandal.)			
2	45	Arizona Cardinals	Kevin Minter	LB	LSU	from San Diego (Note: No. 45: San Diego → Arizona (D). See Round 2: Arizona → San Diego.)
2	46	Buffalo Bills	Kiko Alonso	LB	Oregon	from St. Louis (Note: No. 46: St. Louis → Buffalo (D). See Round 1: Buffalo → St. Louis.)
2	47	Dallas Cowboys	Gavin Escobar	TE	San Diego State	
2	48	Pittsburgh Steelers	Le'Veon Bell ^{†}	RB	Michigan State	
2	49	New York Giants	Johnathan Hankins	DT	Ohio State	
2	50	Chicago Bears	Jonathan Bostic	LB	Florida	
2	51	Washington Redskins	David Amerson	CB	NC State	
2	52	New England Patriots	Jamie Collins ^{†}	LB	Southern Miss	from Minnesota (Note: No. 52: Minnesota → New England (D). See Round 1: New England → Minnesota.)
2	53	Cincinnati Bengals	Margus Hunt	DE	SMU	
2	54	Miami Dolphins	Jamar Taylor	CB	Boise State	from Indianapolis (Note: No. 54: Indianapolis → Miami (PD). Indianapolis traded a second-round selection to Miami in exchange for CB Vontae Davis.)
2	55	San Francisco 49ers	Vance McDonald	TE	Rice	from Green Bay (Note: No. 55: Green Bay → San Francisco (D). Green Bay traded a second-round selection (55th overall) to San Francisco in exchange for second- and sixth-round selections (61st and 173rd overall).)
2	56	Baltimore Ravens	Arthur Brown	LB	Kansas State	from Seattle (Note: No. 56: Seattle → Baltimore (D). Seattle traded a second-round selection (56th overall) to Baltimore in exchange for second-, fifth- and sixth-round selections (62nd, 165th and 199th overall).)
2	57	Houston Texans	D. J. Swearinger	S	South Carolina	
2	58	Denver Broncos	Montee Ball	RB	Wisconsin	
2	59	New England Patriots	Aaron Dobson	WR	Marshall	
2	60	Atlanta Falcons	Robert Alford	CB	Southeastern Louisiana	
2	61	Green Bay Packers	Eddie Lacy ^{†}	RB	Alabama	from San Francisco (Note: No. 61: San Francisco → Green Bay (D). See Round 2: Green Bay → San Francisco.)
2	62	Seattle Seahawks	Christine Michael	RB	Texas A&M	from Baltimore (Note: No. 62: Baltimore → Seattle (D). See Round 2: Seattle → Baltimore.)
3	63	Kansas City Chiefs	Travis Kelce ^{†}	TE	Cincinnati	
3	64	Jacksonville Jaguars	Dwayne Gratz	CB	Connecticut	
3	65	Detroit Lions	Larry Warford ^{†}	G	Kentucky	
3	66	Oakland Raiders	Sio Moore	LB	Connecticut	
3	67	Philadelphia Eagles	Bennie Logan	DT	LSU	
3	68	Cleveland Browns	Leon McFadden	CB	San Diego State	
3	69	Arizona Cardinals	Tyrann Mathieu ^{†}	CB	LSU	
3	70	Tennessee Titans	Blidi Wreh-Wilson	CB	Connecticut	
3	71	St. Louis Rams	T. J. McDonald	S	USC	from Buffalo (Note: No. 71: Buffalo → St. Louis (D). See Round 1: Buffalo → St. Louis.)
3	72	New York Jets	Brian Winters	G	Kent State	
3	73	Tampa Bay Buccaneers	Mike Glennon	QB	NC State	
3	74	Dallas Cowboys	Terrance Williams	WR	Baylor	from Carolina via San Francisco (Note: No. 74: Carolina → San Francisco → Dallas. Multiple trades: Carolina → San Francisco (PD). Carolina traded a third-round selection (74th overall) and a 2012 sixth-round selection to San Francisco in exchange for a 2012 fourth-round selection. San Francisco → Dallas (D). See Round 1: Dallas → San Francisco.)
3	75	New Orleans Saints	Terron Armstead ^{†}	T	Arkansas–Pine Bluff	
3	76	San Diego Chargers	Keenan Allen ^{†}	WR	California	
3	77	Miami Dolphins	Dallas Thomas	G	Tennessee	
3	78	Buffalo Bills	Marquise Goodwin	WR	Texas	from St. Louis (Note: No. 78: St. Louis → Buffalo (D). See Round 1: Buffalo → St. Louis.)
3	79	Pittsburgh Steelers	Markus Wheaton	WR	Oregon State	
3	80	Dallas Cowboys	J. J. Wilcox	S	Georgia Southern	
3	81	New York Giants	Damontre Moore	DE	Texas A&M	
3	82	New Orleans Saints	John Jenkins	DT	Georgia	from Chicago via Miami (Note: No. 82: Chicago → Miami → New Orleans. Multiple trades: Chicago → Miami (PD). Chicago traded a third-round selection (82nd overall) and a 2012 third-round selection to Miami in exchange for WR Brandon Marshall. Miami → New Orleans (D). Miami traded a third-round selection (82nd overall) to New Orleans in exchange for two fourth-round selections (106th and 109th overall).)
3	83	New England Patriots	Logan Ryan	CB	Rutgers	from Minnesota (Note: No. 83: Minnesota → New England (D). See Round 1: New England → Minnesota.)
3	84	Cincinnati Bengals	Shawn Williams	S	Georgia	
3	85	Washington Redskins	Jordan Reed ^{†}	TE	Florida	
3	86	Indianapolis Colts	Hugh Thornton	G	Illinois	
3	87	Seattle Seahawks	Jordan Hill	DT	Penn State	
3	88	San Francisco 49ers	Corey Lemonier	DE	Auburn	from Green Bay (Note: No. 88: Green Bay → San Francisco (D). Green Bay traded a third-round selection (88th overall) to San Francisco in exchange for third- and seventh-round selections (93rd and 216th overall).)
3	89	Houston Texans	Brennan Williams	T	North Carolina	
3	90	Denver Broncos	Kayvon Webster	CB	South Florida	
3	91	New England Patriots	Duron Harmon	S	Rutgers	
3	92	St. Louis Rams	Stedman Bailey	WR	West Virginia	from Atlanta (Note: No. 92: Atlanta → St. Louis (D). See Round 1: St. Louis → Atlanta.)
3	93	Miami Dolphins	Will Davis	CB	Utah State	from San Francisco via Green Bay (Note: No. 93: San Francisco → Green Bay → Miami. Multiple trades: San Francisco → Green Bay (D). See Round 3: Green Bay → San Francisco. Green Bay → Miami (D). Green Bay traded a third-round selection (93rd overall) to Miami in exchange for fourth-, fifth- and seventh-round selections (109th, 146th and 224th overall). (Note: Demovsky, Rob (April 27, 2013). "Thompson's trades yield 10 picks for draft's final day". greenbaypressgazette.com.))
3	94	Baltimore Ravens	Brandon Williams ^{†}	DT	Missouri Southern	
3*	95	Houston Texans	Sam Montgomery	DE	LSU	
3*	96	Kansas City Chiefs	Knile Davis	RB	Arkansas	
3*	97	Tennessee Titans	Zaviar Gooden	LB	Missouri	
4	98	Philadelphia Eagles	Matt Barkley	QB	USC	from Jacksonville (Note: No. 98: Jacksonville → Philadelphia (D). Jacksonville traded a fourth-round selection (98th overall) to Philadelphia in exchange for fourth- and seventh-round selections (101st and 210th overall).)
4	99	Kansas City Chiefs	Nico Johnson	LB	Alabama	
4	100	Tampa Bay Buccaneers	Akeem Spence	DT	Illinois	from Oakland (Note: No. 100: Oakland → Tampa Bay (D). Oakland traded a fourth-round selection (100th overall) to Tampa Bay in exchange for fourth- and sixth-round selections (112th and 181st overall).)
4	101	Jacksonville Jaguars	Ace Sanders	WR	South Carolina	from Philadelphia (Note: No. 101: Philadelphia → Jacksonville (D). See Round 4: Jacksonville → Philadelphia.)
4	102	New England Patriots	Josh Boyce	WR	TCU	from Detroit via Minnesota (Note: No. 102: Detroit → Minnesota → New England. Multiple trades: Detroit → Minnesota (PD). Detroit traded a fourth-round selection (102nd overall) and a 2012 seventh-round selection to Minnesota in exchange for 2012 fifth- and seventh-round selections. Minnesota → New England (D). See Round 1: New England → Minnesota.)
4	103	Arizona Cardinals	Alex Okafor	DE	Texas	
4	104	Miami Dolphins	Jelani Jenkins	LB	Florida	from Cleveland (Note: No. 104: Cleveland → Miami (D). Cleveland traded fourth- and fifth-round selections (104th and 164th overall) to Miami in exchange for fourth- and seventh-round selections (111th and 217th overall), and WR Davone Bess.)
4	105	Buffalo Bills	Duke Williams	S	Nevada	
4	106	Miami Dolphins	Dion Sims	TE	Michigan State	from NY Jets via New Orleans (Note: No. 106: NY Jets → New Orleans → Miami. Multiple trades: NY Jets → New Orleans (D). The NY Jets traded a fourth-round selection (106th overall) to New Orleans in exchange for RB Chris Ivory. New Orleans → Miami (D). See Round 3: Miami → New Orleans.)
4	107	Tennessee Titans	Brian Schwenke	C	California	
4	108	Carolina Panthers	Edmund Kugbila	G	Valdosta State	
4	109	Green Bay Packers	David Bakhtiari ^{†}	T	Colorado	from New Orleans via Miami (Note: No. 109: New Orleans → Miami → Green Bay. Multiple trades: New Orleans → Miami (D). See Round 3: Miami → New Orleans. Miami → Green Bay (D). See Round 3: Green Bay → Miami.)
4	110	New York Giants	Ryan Nassib	QB	Syracuse	from San Diego via Arizona (Note: No. 110: San Diego → Arizona → NY Giants. Multiple trades: San Diego → Arizona (D). See Round 2: Arizona → San Diego. Arizona → NY Giants (D). Arizona traded a fourth-round selection (110th overall) to the NY Giants in exchange for fourth- and sixth-round selections (116th and 187th overall).)
4	111	Pittsburgh Steelers	Shamarko Thomas	S	Syracuse	from Miami via Cleveland (Note: No. 111: Miami → Cleveland → Pittsburgh. Multiple trades: Miami → Cleveland (D). See Round 4: Cleveland → Miami. Cleveland → Pittsburgh (D). Cleveland traded a fourth-round selection (111th overall) to Pittsburgh in exchange for a 2014 third-round selection.)
4	112	Oakland Raiders	Tyler Wilson	QB	Arkansas	from Tampa Bay (Note: No. 112: Tampa Bay → Oakland (D). See Round 4: Oakland → Tampa Bay.)
4	113	St. Louis Rams	Barrett Jones	G	Alabama	
4	114	Dallas Cowboys	B. W. Webb	CB	William & Mary	
4	115	Pittsburgh Steelers	Landry Jones	QB	Oklahoma	
4	116	Arizona Cardinals	Earl Watford	G	James Madison	from NY Giants (Note: No. 116: NY Giants → Arizona (D). See Round 4: Arizona → NY Giants.)
4	117	Chicago Bears	Khaseem Greene	LB	Rutgers	
4	118	Cincinnati Bengals	Sean Porter	LB	Texas A&M	
4	119	Washington Redskins	Phillip Thomas	S	Fresno State	
4	120	Minnesota Vikings	Gerald Hodges	LB	Penn State	
4	121	Indianapolis Colts	Khaled Holmes	C	USC	
4	122	Green Bay Packers	J. C. Tretter	T	Cornell	
4	123	Seattle Seahawks	Chris Harper	WR	Kansas State	
4	124	Houston Texans	Trevardo Williams	DE	Connecticut	
4	125	Green Bay Packers	Johnathan Franklin	RB	UCLA	from Denver (Note: No. 125: Denver → Green Bay (D). Denver traded a fourth-round selection (125th overall) to Green Bay in exchange for fifth- and sixth-round selections (146th and 173rd overall).)
4	126	Tampa Bay Buccaneers	William Gholston	DE	Michigan State	from New England (Note: No. 126: New England → Tampa Bay (PD). New England traded a fourth-round selection (126th overall) to Tampa Bay in exchange for a seventh-round selection (226th overall) and CB Aqib Talib.)
4	127	Atlanta Falcons	Malliciah Goodman	DE	Clemson	
4	128	San Francisco 49ers	Quinton Patton	WR	Louisiana Tech	
4	129	Baltimore Ravens	John Simon	DE	Ohio State	
4*	130	Baltimore Ravens	Kyle Juszczyk ^{†}	FB	Harvard	
4*	131	San Francisco 49ers	Marcus Lattimore	RB	South Carolina	
4*	132	Detroit Lions	Devin Taylor	DE	South Carolina	
4*	133	Atlanta Falcons	Levine Toilolo	TE	Stanford	
5	134	Kansas City Chiefs	Sanders Commings	CB	Georgia	
5	135	Jacksonville Jaguars	Denard Robinson	RB	Michigan	
5	136	Philadelphia Eagles	Earl Wolff	S	NC State	
5	137	Seattle Seahawks	Jesse Williams	DT	Alabama	from Detroit (Note: No. 137: Detroit → Seattle (D). Detroit traded a fifth-round selection (137th overall) to Seattle in exchange for fifth- and sixth-round selections (165th and 199th overall).)
5	138	Seattle Seahawks	Tharold Simon	CB	LSU	from Oakland (Note: No. 138: Oakland → Seattle (PD). Oakland traded a fifth-round selection (138th overall) and a 2012 seventh-round selection to Seattle in exchange for LB Aaron Curry.)
5	139	Indianapolis Colts	Montori Hughes	DT	UT Martin	from Cleveland (Note: No. 139: Cleveland → Indianapolis (D). Cleveland traded a fifth-round selection (139th overall) to Indianapolis in exchange for a 2014 fourth-round selection.)
5	140	Arizona Cardinals	Stepfan Taylor	RB	Stanford	
5	141	New York Jets	Oday Aboushi	G	Virginia	
5	142	Tennessee Titans	Lavar Edwards	DE	LSU	
5	143	Buffalo Bills	Jonathan Meeks	S	Clemson	
5	144	New Orleans Saints	Kenny Stills	WR	Oklahoma	
5	145	San Diego Chargers	Steve Williams	CB	California	
5	146	Denver Broncos	Quanterus Smith	DE	Western Kentucky	from Miami via Green Bay (Note: No. 146: Miami → Green Bay → Denver. Multiple trades: Miami → Green Bay (D). See Round 3: Green Bay → Miami. Green Bay → Denver (D). See Round 4: Denver → Green Bay.)
5	147	Tampa Bay Buccaneers	Steven Means	LB	Buffalo	
5	148	Carolina Panthers	A. J. Klein	LB	Iowa State	
5	149	St. Louis Rams	Brandon McGee	CB	Miami (FL)	
5	150	Pittsburgh Steelers	Terry Hawthorne	CB	Illinois	
5	151	Dallas Cowboys	Joseph Randle	RB	Oklahoma State	
5	152	New York Giants	Cooper Taylor	S	Richmond	
5	153	Atlanta Falcons	Stansly Maponga	DE	TCU	from Chicago (Note: No. 153: Chicago → Atlanta (D). Chicago traded a fifth-round selection (153rd overall) to Atlanta in exchange for fifth- and seventh-round selections (163rd and 236th overall).)
5	154	Washington Redskins	Chris Thompson	RB	Florida State	
5	155	Minnesota Vikings	Jeff Locke	P	UCLA	
5	156	Cincinnati Bengals	Tanner Hawkinson	T	Kansas	
5	157	San Francisco 49ers	Quinton Dial	DE	Alabama	from Indianapolis (Note: No. 157: Indianapolis → San Francisco (PD). Indianapolis traded a fifth-round selection (157th overall) and a 2012 fourth-round selection to San Francisco in exchange for a 2012 third-round selection.)
5	158	Seattle Seahawks	Luke Willson	TE	Rice	
5	159	Green Bay Packers	Micah Hyde ^{†}	CB	Iowa	
5	160	St. Louis Rams	Zac Stacy	RB	Vanderbilt	from Houston (Note: No. 160: Houston → St. Louis (D). Houston traded a fifth-round selection (160th overall) to St. Louis in exchange for two sixth-round selections (184th and 198th overall).)
5	161	Denver Broncos	Tavarres King	WR	Georgia	
5	162	Washington Redskins	Brandon Jenkins	LB	Florida State	from New England (Note: No. 162: New England → Washington (PD). New England traded a fifth-round selection (162nd overall) to Washington in exchange for DT Albert Haynesworth.)
5	163	Chicago Bears	Jordan Mills	T	Louisiana Tech	from Atlanta (Note: No. 163: Atlanta → Chicago (D). See Round 5: Chicago → Atlanta.)
5	164	Miami Dolphins	Mike Gillislee	RB	Florida	from San Francisco via Cleveland (Note: No. 164: San Francisco → Cleveland → Miami. Multiple trades: San Francisco → Cleveland (PD). San Francisco traded fifth- and seventh-round selections (164th and 227th) to Cleveland in exchange for a sixth-round selection (173rd overall) and QB Colt McCoy. Cleveland → Miami (D). See Round 4: Cleveland → Miami.)
5	165	Detroit Lions	Sam Martin	P	Appalachian State	from Baltimore via Seattle (Note: No. 165: Baltimore → Seattle → Detroit. Multiple trades: Baltimore → Seattle (D). See Round 2: Seattle → Baltimore. Seattle → Detroit (D). See Round 5: Detroit → Seattle.)
5*	166	Miami Dolphins	Caleb Sturgis	K	Florida	
5*	167	Green Bay Packers	Josh Boyd	DT	Mississippi State	
5*	168	Baltimore Ravens	Ricky Wagner	T	Wisconsin	
6	169	Jacksonville Jaguars	Josh Evans	S	Florida	
6	170	Kansas City Chiefs	Eric Kush	C	California (PA)	
6	171	Detroit Lions	Corey Fuller	WR	Virginia Tech	
6	172	Oakland Raiders	Nick Kasa	TE	Colorado	
6	173	Denver Broncos	Vinston Painter	T	Virginia Tech	from Philadelphia via Cleveland, San Francisco and Green Bay (Note: No. 173: Philadelphia → Cleveland → San Francisco → Green Bay → Denver. Multiple trades: Philadelphia → Cleveland (PD). Philadelphia traded a sixth-round selection (173rd overall) to Cleveland in exchange for a seventh-round selection (212th overall) and S David Sims. Cleveland → San Francisco (PD). See Round 5: San Francisco → Cleveland. San Francisco → Green Bay (D). See Round 2: Green Bay → San Francisco. Green Bay → Denver (D). See Round 4: Denver → Green Bay.)
6	174	Arizona Cardinals	Ryan Swope	WR	Texas A&M	
6	175	Cleveland Browns	Jamoris Slaughter	S	Notre Dame	
6	176	Houston Texans	David Quessenberry	T	San Jose State	from Tennessee via Minnesota, Arizona and Oakland (Note: No. 176: Tennessee → Minnesota → Arizona → Oakland → Houston. Multiple trades: Tennessee → Minnesota (PD). Tennessee traded a sixth-round selection (176th overall) to Minnesota in exchange for a 2012 seventh-round selection. Minnesota → Arizona (PD). Minnesota traded a sixth-round selection (176th overall) to Arizona in exchange for a seventh-round selection (213th overall) and CB A. J. Jefferson. Arizona → Oakland (PD). Arizona traded a sixth-round selection (176th overall) and a conditional 2014 selection to Oakland in exchange for a seventh-round selection (219th) and QB Carson Palmer. Oakland → Houston (D). Oakland traded a sixth-round selection (176th overall) to Houston in exchange for sixth- and seventh-round selections (184th and 233rd overall).)
6	177	Buffalo Bills	Dustin Hopkins	K	Florida State	
6	178	New York Jets	William Campbell	G	Michigan	
6	179	San Diego Chargers	Tourek Williams	DE	FIU	
6	180	San Francisco 49ers	Nick Moody	LB	Florida State	from Miami (Note: No. 180: Miami → San Francisco (PD). Miami traded a sixth-round selection (180th overall) and 2012 fourth- and sixth-round selections to San Francisco in exchange for a 2012 fourth-round selection.)
6	181	Oakland Raiders	Latavius Murray ^{†}	RB	UCF	from Tampa Bay (Note: No. 181: Tampa Bay → Oakland (D). See Round 4: Oakland → Tampa Bay.)
6	182	Carolina Panthers	Kenjon Barner	RB	Oregon	
6	183	New Orleans Saints	Rufus Johnson	DE	Tarleton State	
6	184	Oakland Raiders	Mychal Rivera	TE	Tennessee	from St. Louis via Houston (Note: No. 184: St. Louis → Houston → Oakland. Multiple trades: St. Louis → Houston (D). See Round 5: Houston → St. Louis. Houston → Oakland (D). See Round 6: Oakland → Houston.)
6	185	Dallas Cowboys	DeVonte Holloman	LB	South Carolina	
6	186	Pittsburgh Steelers	Justin Brown	WR	Oklahoma	
6	187	Arizona Cardinals	Andre Ellington	RB	Clemson	from NY Giants (Note: No. 187: NY Giants → Arizona (D). See Round 4: Arizona → NY Giants.)
6	188	Chicago Bears	Cornelius Washington	DE	Georgia	
6	189	Tampa Bay Buccaneers	Mike James	RB	Miami (FL)	from Minnesota (Note: No. 189: Minnesota → Tampa Bay (D). Minnesota traded a sixth-round selection (189th overall) to Tampa Bay in exchange for sixth- and seventh-round selections (196th and 229th overall).)
6	190	Cincinnati Bengals	Rex Burkhead	RB	Nebraska	
6	191	Washington Redskins	Bacarri Rambo	S	Georgia	
6	192	Indianapolis Colts	John Boyett	S	Oregon	
6	193	Green Bay Packers	Nate Palmer	OLB	Illinois State	
6	194	Seattle Seahawks	Spencer Ware	RB	LSU	
6	195	Houston Texans	Alan Bonner	WR	Jacksonville State	
6	196	Minnesota Vikings	Jeff Baca	G	UCLA	from Denver via Philadelphia and Tampa Bay (Note: No. 196: Denver → Philadelphia → Tampa Bay → Minnesota. Multiple trades: Denver → Philadelphia (PD). Denver traded a sixth-round selection (196th overall) to Philadelphia in exchange for DT Brodrick Bunkley. Philadelphia → Tampa Bay (PD). Philadelphia traded a sixth-round selection (196th overall) and a conditional 2014 selection to Tampa Bay in exchange for a seventh-round selection (218th overall) and WR Arrelious Benn. Tampa Bay → Minnesota (D). See Round 6: Minnesota → Tampa Bay.)
6	197	Cincinnati Bengals	Cobi Hamilton	WR	Arkansas	from New England (Note: No. 197: New England → Cincinnati (PD). New England traded a sixth-round selection (197th overall) and a 2012 fifth-round selection to Cincinnati in exchange for WR Chad Johnson.)
6	198	Houston Texans	Chris Jones	DT	Bowling Green	from Atlanta via St. Louis (Note: No. 198: Atlanta → St. Louis → Houston. Multiple trades: Atlanta → St. Louis (D). See Round 1: St. Louis → Atlanta. St. Louis → Houston (D). See Round 5: Houston → St. Louis.)
6	199	Detroit Lions	Theo Riddick	RB	Notre Dame	from San Francisco via Baltimore and Seattle (Note: No. 199: San Francisco → Baltimore → Seattle → Detroit. Multiple trades: San Francisco → Baltimore (PD). San Francisco traded a sixth-round selection (199th overall) to Baltimore in exchange for WR Anquan Boldin. Baltimore → Seattle (D). See Round 2: Seattle → Baltimore. Seattle → Detroit (D). See Round 5: Detroit → Seattle.)
6	200	Baltimore Ravens	Kapron Lewis-Moore	DE	Notre Dame	
6*	201	Houston Texans	Ryan Griffin	TE	Connecticut	
6*	202	Tennessee Titans	Khalid Wooten	CB	Nevada	
6*	203	Baltimore Ravens	Ryan Jensen ^{†}	T	CSU–Pueblo	
6*	204	Kansas City Chiefs	Braden Wilson	FB	Kansas State	
6*	205	Oakland Raiders	Stacy McGee	DT	Oklahoma	
6*	206	Pittsburgh Steelers	Vince Williams	LB	Florida State	
7	207	Kansas City Chiefs	Mike Catapano	DE	Princeton	
7	208	Jacksonville Jaguars	Jeremy Harris	CB	New Mexico State	
7	209	Oakland Raiders	Brice Butler	WR	San Diego State	
7	210	Jacksonville Jaguars	Demetrius McCray	CB	Appalachian State	from Philadelphia (Note: No. 210: Philadelphia → Jacksonville (D). See Round 4: Jacksonville → Philadelphia.)
7	211	Detroit Lions	Michael Williams	TE	Alabama	
7	212	Philadelphia Eagles	Joe Kruger	DE	Utah	from Cleveland (Note: No. 212: Cleveland → Philadelphia (PD). See Round 6: Philadelphia → Cleveland.)
7	213	Minnesota Vikings	Michael Mauti	LB	Penn State	from Arizona (Note: No. 213: Arizona → Minnesota (PD). See Round 6: Minnesota → Arizona.)
7	214	Minnesota Vikings	Travis Bond	G	North Carolina	from Buffalo via Seattle (Note: No. 214: Buffalo → Seattle → Minnesota. Multiple trades: Buffalo → Seattle (PD). Buffalo traded a seventh-round selection (214th overall) to Seattle in exchange for QB Tarvaris Jackson. Seattle → Minnesota (PD). See Round 1: Seattle → Minnesota.)
7	215	New York Jets	Tommy Bohanon	FB	Wake Forest	
7	216	Green Bay Packers	Charles Johnson	WR	Grand Valley State	from Tennessee via San Francisco (Note: No. 216: Tennessee → San Francisco → Green Bay. Multiple trades: Tennessee → San Francisco (D). See Round 2: San Francisco → Tennessee. San Francisco → Green Bay (D). See Round 3: Green Bay → San Francisco.)
7	217	Cleveland Browns	Armonty Bryant	DE	East Central	from Miami (Note: No. 217: Miami → Cleveland (D). See Round 4: Cleveland → Miami.)
7	218	Philadelphia Eagles	Jordan Poyer ^{†}	CB	Oregon State	from Tampa Bay (Note: No. 218: Tampa Bay → Philadelphia (PD). See Round 6: Philadelphia → Tampa Bay.)
7	219	Arizona Cardinals	D. C. Jefferson	TE	Rutgers	from Carolina via Oakland (Note: No. 219: Carolina → Oakland → Arizona. Multiple trades: Carolina → Oakland (PD). Carolina traded a seventh-round selection (219th overall) to Oakland in exchange for WR Louis Murphy. Oakland → Arizona (PD). See Round 6: Arizona → Oakland.)
7	220	Seattle Seahawks	Ryan Seymour	G	Vanderbilt	from New Orleans (Note: No. 220: New Orleans → Seattle (PD). New Orleans traded a seventh-round selection (220th overall) to Seattle in exchange for LB Barrett Ruud.)
7	221	San Diego Chargers	Brad Sorensen	QB	Southern Utah	
7	222	Buffalo Bills	Chris Gragg	TE	Arkansas	from St. Louis (Note: No. 222: St. Louis → Buffalo (D). See Round 1: Buffalo → St. Louis.)
7	223	Pittsburgh Steelers	Nicholas Williams	DT	Samford	
7	224	Green Bay Packers	Kevin Dorsey	WR	Maryland	from Dallas via Miami (Note: No. 224: Dallas → Miami → Green Bay. Multiple trades: Dallas → Miami (PD). Dallas traded a seventh-round selection (224th overall) to Miami in exchange for C Ryan Cook. Miami → Green Bay (D). See Round 3: Green Bay → Miami.)
7	225	New York Giants	Eric Herman	G	Ohio	
7	226	New England Patriots	Michael Buchanan	DE	Illinois	from Chicago via Tampa Bay (Note: No. 226: Chicago → Tampa Bay → New England. Multiple trades: Chicago → Tampa Bay (PD). Chicago traded a seventh-round selection (226th overall) to Tampa Bay in exchange for DT Brian Price. Tampa Bay → New England (PD). See Round 4: New England → Tampa Bay.)
7	227	Cleveland Browns	Garrett Gilkey	G	Chadron State	from Cincinnati via San Francisco (Note: No. 227: Cincinnati → San Francisco → Cleveland. Multiple trades: Cincinnati → San Francisco (PD). Cincinnati traded a seventh-round selection (227th overall) to San Francisco in exchange for S Taylor Mays. San Francisco → Cleveland (PD). See Round 5: San Francisco → Cleveland.)
7	228	Washington Redskins	Jawan Jamison	RB	Rutgers	
7	229	Minnesota Vikings	Everett Dawkins	DT	Florida State	from Minnesota via New England and Tampa Bay (Note: No. 229: Minnesota → New England → Tampa Bay → Minnesota. Multiple trades: Minnesota → New England (D). See Round 1: New England → Minnesota. New England → Tampa Bay (D). New England traded a seventh-round selection (229th overall) and RB Jeff Demps to Tampa Bay in exchange for RB LeGarrette Blount. Tampa Bay → Minnesota (D). See Round 6: Minnesota → Tampa Bay.)
7	230	Indianapolis Colts	Kerwynn Williams	RB	Utah State	
7	231	Seattle Seahawks	Ty Powell	LB	Harding	
7	232	Green Bay Packers	Sam Barrington	LB	South Florida	
7	233	Oakland Raiders	David Bass	DE	Missouri Western	from Houston (Note: No. 233: Houston → Oakland (D). See Round 6: Oakland → Houston.)
7	234	Denver Broncos	Zac Dysert	QB	Miami (OH)	
7	235	New England Patriots	Steve Beauharnais	LB	Rutgers	
7	236	Chicago Bears	Marquess Wilson	WR	Washington State	from Atlanta (Note: No. 236: Atlanta → Chicago (D). See Round 5: Chicago → Atlanta.)
7	237	San Francisco 49ers	B. J. Daniels	QB	South Florida	
7	238	Baltimore Ravens	Aaron Mellette	WR	Elon	
7*	239	Philadelphia Eagles	David King	DE	Oklahoma	
7*	240	Cincinnati Bengals	Reid Fragel	T	Ohio State	
7*	241	Seattle Seahawks	Jared Smith	DT	New Hampshire	
7*	242	Seattle Seahawks	Michael Bowie	T	Northeastern State	
7*	243	Atlanta Falcons	Kemal Ishmael	S	UCF	
7*	244	Atlanta Falcons	Zeke Motta	S	Notre Dame	
7*	245	Detroit Lions	Brandon Hepburn	LB	Florida A&M	
7*	246	San Francisco 49ers	Carter Bykowski	T	Iowa State	
7*	247	Baltimore Ravens	Marc Anthony	CB	California	
7*	248	Tennessee Titans	Daimion Stafford	S	Nebraska	
7*	249	Atlanta Falcons	Sean Renfree	QB	Duke	
7*	250	Miami Dolphins	Don Jones	S	Arkansas State	
7*	251	Cincinnati Bengals	T. J. Johnson	C	South Carolina	
7*	252	San Francisco 49ers	Marcus Cooper	CB	Rutgers	
7*	253	New York Giants	Michael Cox	RB	UMass	
7*	254	Indianapolis Colts	Justice Cunningham	TE	South Carolina	

== Notable undrafted players ==
^{†}	Pro Bowler

Original NFL team	Player	Pos.	College	Notes
Arizona Cardinals	Jaron Brown	WR	Clemson	
Arizona Cardinals	Tony Jefferson	S	Oklahoma	
Atlanta Falcons	Joplo Bartu	LB	Texas State	
Atlanta Falcons	Darius Johnson	WR	SMU	
Atlanta Falcons	Ryan Schraeder	T	Valdosta State	
Atlanta Falcons	Paul Worrilow	LB	Delaware	
Baltimore Ravens	Marlon Brown	WR	Georgia	
Baltimore Ravens	Jordan Devey	T	Memphis	
Baltimore Ravens	Brynden Trawick ^{†}	S	Troy	
Buffalo Bills	Jordan Dangerfield	S	Towson	
Buffalo Bills	Nickell Robey-Coleman	CB	USC	
Buffalo Bills	Da'Rick Rogers	WR	Tennessee Tech	
Buffalo Bills	Jumal Rolle	CB	Catawba	
Buffalo Bills	Jeff Tuel	QB	Washington State	
Carolina Panthers	Wes Horton	DE	USC	
Carolina Panthers	Robert Lester	S	Alabama	
Carolina Panthers	Melvin White	CB	Louisiana	
Chicago Bears	Demontre Hurst	CB	Oklahoma	
Chicago Bears	Tress Way ^{†}	P	Oklahoma	
Dallas Cowboys	Jeff Heath	S	Saginaw Valley State	
Denver Broncos	C. J. Anderson ^{†}	RB	California	
Denver Broncos	Lerentee McCray	LB	Florida	
Detroit Lions	Joseph Fauria	TE	UCLA	
Detroit Lions	LaAdrian Waddle	T	Texas Tech	
Green Bay Packers	Chris Banjo	S	SMU	
Green Bay Packers	Patrick Lewis	C	Texas A&M	
Green Bay Packers	Jake Stoneburner	TE	Ohio State	
Green Bay Packers	Lane Taylor	G	Oklahoma State	
Green Bay Packers	Jeremy Vujnovich	G	Louisiana College	
Green Bay Packers	Myles White	WR	Louisiana Tech	
Houston Texans	A. J. Bouye ^{†}	CB	UCF	
Houston Texans	Ja'Gared Davis	LB	SMU	
Houston Texans	Justin Tuggle	LB	Kansas State	
Indianapolis Colts	Brandon McManus	K	Temple	
Jacksonville Jaguars	Marcus Burley	CB	Delaware	
Jacksonville Jaguars	Abry Jones	DT	Georgia	
Jacksonville Jaguars	Jason Myers ^{†}	K	Marist	
Jacksonville Jaguars	LaRoy Reynolds	LB	Virginia	
Jacksonville Jaguars	Steven Terrell	S	Texas A&M	
Jacksonville Jaguars	Carson Tinker	LS	Alabama	
Kansas City Chiefs	Tyler Bray	QB	Tennessee	
Kansas City Chiefs	Demetrius Harris	TE	Wisconsin–Milwaukee	
Kansas City Chiefs	Josh Martin	LB	Columbia	
Kansas City Chiefs	Bradley McDougald	S	Kansas	
Miami Dolphins	Chris Barker	G	Nevada	
Miami Dolphins	A. J. Francis	NT	Maryland	
Miami Dolphins	Jordan Kovacs	S	Michigan	
Minnesota Vikings	Zach Line	FB	SMU	
Minnesota Vikings	Adam Thielen ^{†}	WR	Minnesota State	
New England Patriots	Ryan Allen	P	Louisiana Tech	
New England Patriots	Josh Kline	G	Kent State	
New England Patriots	Kenbrell Thompkins	WR	Cincinnati	
New England Patriots	Joe Vellano	DT	Maryland	
New Orleans Saints	Ryan Griffin	QB	Tulane	
New Orleans Saints	Josh Hill	TE	Idaho State	
New Orleans Saints	Tim Lelito	G	Grand Valley State	
New Orleans Saints	Khiry Robinson	RB	West Texas A&M	
New York Jets	Brett Maher	K	Nebraska	
New York Jets	Rontez Miles	S	California (PA)	
Oakland Raiders	Brian Leonhardt	TE	Bemidji State	
Oakland Raiders	Matt McGloin	QB	Penn State	
Philadelphia Eagles	Damion Square	DT	Alabama	
Philadelphia Eagles	Matt Tobin	T	Iowa	
Philadelphia Eagles	James Winchester	LS	Oklahoma	
Philadelphia Eagles	Brad Wing	P	LSU	
Pittsburgh Steelers	Terence Garvin	LB	West Virginia	
Pittsburgh Steelers	Chris Hubbard	T	UAB	
San Diego Chargers	Jahleel Addae	SS	Central Michigan	
San Diego Chargers	Marcus Cromartie	CB	Wisconsin	
San Francisco 49ers	MarQueis Gray	TE	Minnesota	
San Francisco 49ers	Kevin McDermott	LS	UCLA	
San Francisco 49ers	Darryl Morris	CB	Texas State	
San Francisco 49ers	Patrick Omameh	G	Michigan	
San Francisco 49ers	Mike Purcell	NT	Wyoming	
San Francisco 49ers	Colton Schmidt	P	UC Davis	
Seattle Seahawks	Alvin Bailey	G	Arkansas	
Seattle Seahawks	Darren Fells	TE	UC Irvine	
Seattle Seahawks	Benson Mayowa	DE	Idaho	
St. Louis Rams	Ray-Ray Armstrong	LB	Miami (FL)	
St. Louis Rams	Daren Bates	LB	Auburn	
St. Louis Rams	Benny Cunningham	RB	Middle Tennessee	
St. Louis Rams	Cody Davis	FS	Texas Tech	
Tampa Bay Buccaneers	Rashaan Melvin	CB	Northern Illinois	
Tampa Bay Buccaneers	Russell Shepard	WR	LSU	
Tampa Bay Buccaneers	Tim Wright	WR	Rutgers	
Tennessee Titans	Rashad Ross	WR	Arizona State	
Tennessee Titans	Jack Doyle ^{†}	TE	Western Kentucky	
Washington Redskins	Will Compton	LB	Nebraska	
Washington Redskins	Nick Williams	WR	Connecticut	

== Trades ==
In the explanations below, (D) denotes trades that took place during the draft, while (PD) indicates trades completed pre-draft.

Round 1

Round 2

Round 3

Round 4

Round 5

Round 6

Round 7

== Forfeited picks ==
Two selections in the 2013 draft were forfeited:

== Supplemental draft ==
The supplemental draft was held on July 11, 2013. For each player selected in the supplemental draft, the team forfeits its pick in that round in the draft of the following season. Six players were eligible, but none were selected.

== Selections by conference ==
Selection totals by college conference (including supplemental draft):

No.	Conference	Players selected	Division
1	Southeastern Conference	63^{**}	I FBS
2	Atlantic Coast Conference	31	I FBS
3	Pac-12 Conference	28	I FBS
4	Big Ten Conference	22	I FBS
4	Big 12 Conference	22	I FBS
6	Big East Conference	19	I FBS
7	Conference USA	8	I FBS
8	Independent	7	I FBS
8	Mid-American Conference	7	I FBS
8	Mountain West Conference	7	I FBS
11	Western Athletic Conference	6	I FBS
12	Southern Conference	5	I FCS
13	Colonial Athletic Association	4	I FCS
13	Sun Belt Conference	4	I FBS
15	Ivy League	3	I FCS
15	Mid-America Intercollegiate Athletics Association	3	II
17	Great American Conference	2	II
17	Ohio Valley Conference	2	I FCS
17	Rocky Mountain Athletic Conference	2	II
20	Big Sky Conference	1	I FCS
20	Great Lakes Intercollegiate Athletic Conference	1	II
20	Gulf South Conference	1	II
20	Lone Star Conference	1	II
20	Mid-Eastern Athletic Conference	1	I FCS
20	Missouri Valley Football Conference	1	I FCS
20	Pennsylvania State Athletic Conference	1	II
20	Southland Conference	1	I FCS
20	Southwestern Athletic Conference	1	I FCS

^{^**} 63 players from one conference was an NFL draft record. It was broken in 2019, when 64 were selected.

Twelve players from Southeastern Conference (SEC) programs were selected in the first round, which tied the record for most first-round selections from a single college conference set in 2006 by the Atlantic Coast Conference.

== Schools with multiple draft selections ==
Selections	Schools
11	Florida State
9	Alabama, LSU
8	Florida, Georgia
7	Rutgers, South Carolina
6	Notre Dame, Oklahoma
5	Connecticut, North Carolina, Oregon, Texas A&M
4	Arkansas, California, Clemson, Illinois, Tennessee, UCLA, USC
3	Kansas State, Michigan State, Mississippi State, N.C. State, Ohio State, Penn State, San Diego State, South Florida, Stanford, Syracuse, Texas, West Virginia, Wisconsin
2	Appalachian State, Colorado, FIU, Iowa State, Louisiana Tech, Miami (FL), Michigan, Missouri, Nebraska, Nevada, Oregon State, Rice, TCU, UCF, Utah, Utah State, Vanderbilt, Virginia Tech

== Popular culture ==
During Super Bowl XLVII, the NFL presented a promotional advertisement for the 2013 draft featuring retired athlete Deion Sanders attempting a comeback return under the name "Leon Sandcastle". The ad followed the fictional exploits of Sandcastle (portrayed by Ball State cornerback Andre Dawson) through tryouts until he is drafted first overall by the Kansas City Chiefs.
