= 2012 Princeton Tigers football team =

American college football season

2012 Princeton Tigers football
- Conference: Ivy League
- Record: 5–5 (4–3 Ivy)
- Head coach: Bob Surace (3rd season)
- Offensive coordinator: James Perry (3rd season)
- Offensive scheme: Spread option
- Defensive coordinator: Jared Backus (4th season)
- Base defense: 4–3
- Home stadium: Powers Field at Princeton Stadium

2012 Ivy League football standings
| | Conf. | | | Overall |
| Team | W | | L | W | | L |
|---|---|---|---|---|---|---|
| Penn $ | 6 | – | 1 | 6 | – | 4 |
| Harvard | 5 | – | 2 | 8 | – | 2 |
| Brown | 4 | – | 3 | 7 | – | 3 |
| Dartmouth | 4 | – | 3 | 6 | – | 4 |
| Princeton | 4 | – | 3 | 5 | – | 5 |
| Cornell | 2 | – | 5 | 4 | – | 6 |
| Columbia | 2 | – | 5 | 3 | – | 7 |
| Yale | 1 | – | 6 | 2 | – | 8 |
$ – Conference champion

The 2012 Princeton Tigers football team represented Princeton University in the 2012 NCAA Division I FCS football season. They were led by third-year head coach Bob Surace and played their home games at Powers Field at Princeton Stadium. They are a member of the Ivy League. They finished the season 5–5 overall and 4–3 in Ivy League play to places in a three-way tie for third. Princeton averaged 7,984 fans per game. Captain Mike Catapano was Ivy League Defensive Player of the Year. He was drafted in the 2013 NFL draft by the Kansas City Chiefs with the first pick of the seventh round (207th overall) becoming Princeton's first draftee since Dennis Norman in the 2001 NFL draft.

== Schedule ==
| Date | Time | Opponent | Site | TV | Result | Attendance |
|---|---|---|---|---|---|---|
| September 15 | 12:30 p.m. | at No. 16 Lehigh* | Goodman Stadium; Bethlehem, PA | 2 Sports | L 14–17 | 7,346 |
| September 21 | 7:00 p.m. | Georgetown* | Powers Field at Princeton Stadium; Princeton, NJ | ESPNU | L 20–21 | 6,792 |
| September 29 | 12:30 p.m. | at Columbia | Robert K. Kraft Field at Lawrence A. Wien Stadium; New York, NY | | W 33–6 | 4,469 |
| October 6 | 6:00 p.m. | at Lafayette* | Fisher Stadium; Easton, PA | | W 35–14 | 6,821 |
| October 13 | 12:00 p.m. | Brown | Powers Field at Princeton Stadium; Princeton, NJ | NBCSN | W 19–0 | 6,482 |
| October 20 | 1:00 p.m. | No. 22 Harvard | Powers Field at Princeton Stadium; Princeton, NJ (rivalry) | ESPN3 | W 39–34 | 10,823 |
| October 27 | 12:30 p.m. | at Cornell | Schoellkopf Field; Ithaca, NY | | L 35–37 | 4,420 |
| November 3 | 1:00 p.m. | Penn | Powers Field at Princeton Stadium; Princeton, NJ (rivalry) | ESPN3 | L 21–28 | 7,494 |
| November 10 | 12:00 p.m. | at Yale | Yale Bowl; New Haven, CT (rivalry) | YES | W 29–7 | 21,824 |
| November 17 | 1:00 p.m. | Dartmouth | Powers Field at Princeton Stadium; Princeton, NJ | | L 21–35 | 8,327 |
*Non-conference game; Rankings from The Sports Network Poll released prior to the game; All times are in Eastern time
