= 2012 Bucknell Bison football team =

American college football season

2012 Bucknell Bison football
- Conference: Patriot League
- Record: 3–8 (1–5 Patriot)
- Head coach: Joe Susan (3rd season)
- Offensive coordinator: Bryan Bossard (3rd season)
- Home stadium: Christy Mathewson–Memorial Stadium

2012 Patriot League football standings
| | Conf. | | | Overall |
| Team | W | | L | W | | L |
|---|---|---|---|---|---|---|
| No. 24 Colgate $^ | 6 | – | 0 | 8 | – | 4 |
| No. 13 Lehigh | 5 | – | 1 | 10 | – | 1 |
| Georgetown | 2 | – | 4 | 5 | – | 6 |
| Lafayette | 2 | – | 4 | 5 | – | 6 |
| Holy Cross | 2 | – | 4 | 2 | – | 9 |
| Bucknell | 1 | – | 5 | 3 | – | 8 |
| Fordham | 0 | – | 0 | 6 | – | 5 |
$ – Conference champion; ^ – FCS playoff participant; Fordham was ineligible for conference title because they offered football scholarships while other Patriot League members did not.; Rankings from The Sports Network poll

The 2012 Bucknell Bison football team represented Bucknell University as a member of the Patriot League during the 2012 NCAA Division I FCS football season. Led by third-year head coach Joe Susan, the Bison compiled an overall record of 3–8 with a mark of 1–5 in conference play, placing sixth in the Patriot League. Bucknell played home games at Christy Mathewson–Memorial Stadium in Lewisburg, Pennsylvania.

== Schedule ==
| Date | Time | Opponent | Site | TV | Result | Attendance |
|---|---|---|---|---|---|---|
| September 8 | 6:00 pm | at Marist* | Tenney Stadium at Leonidoff Field; Poughkeepsie, NY | | W 19–17 | 2,187 |
| September 15 | 3:30 pm | at No. 13 Delaware* | Delaware Stadium; Newark, DE | | L 3–19 | 18,118 |
| September 22 | 12:00 pm | Lafayette | Christy Mathewson–Memorial Stadium; Lewisburg, PA | CBSSN | L 14–20 | 5,254 |
| September 29 | 6:00 pm | Cornell* | Christy Mathewson–Memorial Stadium; Lewisburg, PA | | L 10–15 | 3,417 |
| October 6 | 1:00 pm | at Holy Cross | Fitton Field; Worcester, MA | | L 6–13 | 3,297 |
| October 13 | 3:30 pm | at No. 22 Harvard* | Harvard Stadium; Boston, MA | CBSSN | L 7–35 | 9,558 |
| October 20 | 12:30 pm | at No. 9 Lehigh | Goodman Stadium; Bethlehem, PA | 2 Sports | L 19–42 | 7,188 |
| October 27 | 1:00 pm | Colgate | Christy Mathewson–Memorial Stadium; Lewisburg, PA | | L 33–47 | 4,132 |
| November 3 | 1:00 pm | Fordham | Christy Mathewson–Memorial Stadium; Lewisburg, PA | | W 27–24 | 1,152 |
| November 10 | 1:00 pm | at Georgetown | Multi-Sport Field; Washington, D.C. | | L 3–10 | 1,934 |
| November 17 | 1:00 pm | Bryant* | Christy Mathewson–Memorial Stadium; Lewisburg, PA | | W 24–21 | 1,718 |
*Non-conference game; Rankings from The Sports Network Poll released prior to the game; All times are in Eastern time
