= 2012 Lehigh Mountain Hawks football team =

American college football season

2012 Lehigh Mountain Hawks football
- Conference: Patriot League

Ranking
- Sports Network: No. 13
- FCS Coaches: No. 10
- Record: 10–1 (5–1 Patriot)
- Head coach: Andy Coen (7th season)
- Offensive coordinator: Dave Cecchini
- Co-defensive coordinators: Donnie Roberts; Gerard Wilcher (1st season)
- Home stadium: Goodman Stadium

2012 Patriot League football standings
	Conf.			Overall
Team	W		L	W		L
No. 24 Colgate $^	6	–	0	8	–	4
No. 13 Lehigh	5	–	1	10	–	1
Georgetown	2	–	4	5	–	6
Lafayette	2	–	4	5	–	6
Holy Cross	2	–	4	2	–	9
Bucknell	1	–	5	3	–	8
Fordham	0	–	0	6	–	5
$ – Conference champion; ^ – FCS playoff participant; Fordham was ineligible for conference title because they offered football scholarships while other Patriot League members did not.; Rankings from The Sports Network poll

The 2012 Lehigh Mountain Hawks football team represented Lehigh University in the 2012 NCAA Division I FCS football season. They were led by seventh-year head coach Andy Coen and played their home games at Goodman Stadium. They are a member of the Patriot League. They finished the season 10–1, 5–1 in Patriot League play to finish in second place.

== Schedule ==
Date	Time	Opponent	Rank	Site	TV	Result	Attendance
September 1	12:30 p.m.	Monmouth*	No. 16	Goodman Stadium; Bethlehem, PA	2 Sports	W 27–17	6,350
September 8	12:00 p.m.	at Central Connecticut*	No. 16	Arute Field; New Britain, CT		W 35–14	5,098
September 15	12:30 p.m.	Princeton*	No. 16	Goodman Stadium; Bethlehem, PA	2 Sports	W 17–14	7,346
September 22	7:00 p.m.	at Liberty*	No. 16	Williams Stadium; Lynchburg, VA		W 28–26	17,139
September 29	12:30 p.m.	Fordham	No. 15	Goodman Stadium; Bethlehem, PA	2 Sports	W 34–31	9,291
October 6	12:30 p.m.	Columbia*	No. 11	Goodman Stadium; Bethlehem, PA	2 Sports	W 35–14	5,025
October 13	1:00 p.m.	at Georgetown	No. 10	Multi-Sport Field; Washington, DC		W 17–14	2,684
October 20	12:30 p.m.	Bucknell^{†}	No. 9	Goodman Stadium; Bethlehem, PA	2 Sports	W 42–19	7,188
November 3	12:30 p.m.	at Holy Cross	No. 8	Fitton Field; Worcester, MA		W 36–35	4,216
November 10	12:30 p.m.	Colgate	No. 8	Goodman Stadium; Bethlehem, PA	CBSSN	L 24–35	8,036
November 17	1:00 p.m.	at Lafayette	No. 14	Fisher Stadium; Easton, PA (148th meeting of The Rivalry)	WFMZ	W 38–21	13,596
*Non-conference game; ^{†}Homecoming; Rankings from The Sports Network Poll released prior to the game; All times are in Eastern time

== Ranking movements ==
Ranking movements Legend: ██ Increase in ranking ██ Decrease in ranking
	Week																
Poll	Pre	1	2	3	4	5	6	7	8	9	10	11	12	13	14	15	Final
Sports Network	16	16	16	16	15	11	10	9	8	8	8	14	13				
Coaches	11	14	13	13	11	10	10	7	6	6	5	12	10				
