= 2012 Holy Cross Crusaders football team =

American college football season

2012 Holy Cross Crusaders football
- Conference: Patriot League
- Record: 2–9 (2–4 Patriot)
- Head coach: Tom Gilmore (9th season)
- Offensive coordinator: Andy McKenzie (5th season)
- Defensive coordinator: Andy Rondeau (1st season)
- Home stadium: Fitton Field

2012 Patriot League football standings
	Conf.			Overall
Team	W		L	W		L
No. 24 Colgate $^	6	–	0	8	–	4
No. 13 Lehigh	5	–	1	10	–	1
Georgetown	2	–	4	5	–	6
Lafayette	2	–	4	5	–	6
Holy Cross	2	–	4	2	–	9
Bucknell	1	–	5	3	–	8
Fordham	0	–	0	6	–	5
$ – Conference champion; ^ – FCS playoff participant; Fordham was ineligible for conference title because they offered football scholarships while other Patriot League members did not.; Rankings from The Sports Network poll

The 2012 Holy Cross Crusaders football team represented the College of the Holy Cross in the 2012 NCAA Division I FCS football season. They were led by ninth-year head coach Tom Gilmore and played their home games at Fitton Field. They are a member of the Patriot League. They finished the season 2–9, 2–4 in Patriot League play to finish in a three way tie for third place.

== Schedule ==
Date	Time	Opponent	Site	TV	Result	Attendance
August 30	7:30 pm	No. 14 New Hampshire*	Fitton Field; Worcester, MA		L 17–38	12,291
September 15	1:00 pm	Brown*	Fitton Field; Worcester, MA		L 21–24	5,684
September 22	1:00 pm	Dartmouth*^{†}	Fitton Field; Worcester, MA	Charter TV3	L 10–13	9,574
September 28	7:00 pm	at Harvard*	Harvard Stadium; Boston, MA		L 3–52	10,215
October 6	1:00 pm	Bucknell	Fitton Field; Worcester, MA		W 13–6	3,297
October 13	1:00 pm	at Colgate	Andy Kerr Stadium; Hamilton, NY		L 35–51	5,600
October 20	1:00 pm	at Lafayette	Fisher Stadium; Easton, PA		L 13–30	8,521
October 27	1:00 pm	Fordham	Fitton Field; Worcester, MA (Ram–Crusader Cup)	Charter TV3	L 32–36	10,962
November 3	12:30 pm	No. 8 Lehigh	Fitton Field; Worcester, MA		L 35–36	4,216
November 10	1:00 pm	at Wagner*	Wagner College Stadium; Staten Island, NY		L 30–31	2,668
November 17	1:00 pm	at Georgetown	Multi-Sport Field; Washington, DC		W 24–0	1,789
*Non-conference game; ^{†}Homecoming; Rankings from The Sports Network Poll released prior to the game; All times are in Eastern time
