= 2012 Fordham Rams football team =

American college football season

2012 Fordham Rams football
- Conference: Patriot League
- Record: 6–5 (0–0 Patriot)
- Head coach: Joe Moorhead (1st season)
- Offensive coordinator: Andrew Breiner (1st season)
- Defensive coordinator: David Blackwell (1st season)
- Home stadium: Coffey Field

2012 Patriot League football standings
	Conf.			Overall
Team	W		L	W		L
No. 24 Colgate $^	6	–	0	8	–	4
No. 13 Lehigh	5	–	1	10	–	1
Georgetown	2	–	4	5	–	6
Lafayette	2	–	4	5	–	6
Holy Cross	2	–	4	2	–	9
Bucknell	1	–	5	3	–	8
Fordham	0	–	0	6	–	5
$ – Conference champion; ^ – FCS playoff participant; Fordham was ineligible for conference title because they offered football scholarships while other Patriot League members did not.; Rankings from The Sports Network poll

The 2012 Fordham Rams football team represented Fordham University as a member of the Patriot League during the 2012 NCAA Division I FCS football season. Led by first-year head coach Joe Moorhead, the Rams compiled an overall record of 6–5. Fordham was not eligible for the Patriot League championship because the program used scholarship players while the rest of the league's members did not. Fordham had a record of 3–3 against conference opponents, but the Ram's official conference record was 0–0. The team played home games at Coffey Field in The Bronx.

== Schedule ==
Date	Time	Opponent	Site	TV	Result	Attendance
August 30	7:00 pm	Lock Haven*	Coffey Field; Bronx, NY		W 55–0	3,404
September 8	6:00 pm	at Villanova*	Villanova Stadium; Villanova, PA		L 13–28	3,717
September 15	1:00 pm	Cornell*	Coffey Field; Bronx, NY		W 34–27	6,087
September 22	12:30 pm	at Columbia*	Robert K. Kraft Field at Lawrence A. Wien Stadium; New York, NY (Liberty Cup)		W 20–13	4,318
September 29	12:30 pm	at No. 15 Lehigh	Goodman Stadium; Bethlehem, PA	2 Sports	L 31–34	9,291
October 6	1:00 pm	Georgetown	Coffey Field; Bronx, NY		W 38–31	3,639
October 13	7:00 pm	at No. 20 (FBS) Cincinnati*	Nippert Stadium; Cincinnati, OH	ESPN3	L 17–49	26,317
October 27	1:00 pm	at Holy Cross	Fitton Field; Worcester, MA (Ram–Crusader Cup)	Charter TV3	W 36–32	10,962
November 3	1:00 pm	at Bucknell	Christy Mathewson–Memorial Stadium; Lewisburg, PA		L 24–27	1,152
November 10	1:00 pm	Lafayette	Coffey Field; Bronx, NY		W 36–27	5,128
November 17	1:00 pm	Colgate	Coffey Field; Bronx, NY		L 39–41	4,056
*Non-conference game; Rankings from The Sports Network Poll released prior to the game; All times are in Eastern time
