= 2012 Brown Bears football team =

American college football season

2012 Brown Bears football
- Conference: Ivy League
- Record: 7–3 (4–3 Ivy)
- Head coach: Phil Estes (15th season)
- Offensive coordinator: Frank Sheehan (7th season)
- Offensive scheme: Pro-style
- Defensive coordinator: Michael Kelleher (12th season)
- Base defense: 4–3
- Home stadium: Brown Stadium

2012 Ivy League football standings
	Conf.			Overall
Team	W		L	W		L
Penn $	6	–	1	6	–	4
Harvard	5	–	2	8	–	2
Brown	4	–	3	7	–	3
Dartmouth	4	–	3	6	–	4
Princeton	4	–	3	5	–	5
Cornell	2	–	5	4	–	6
Columbia	2	–	5	3	–	7
Yale	1	–	6	2	–	8
$ – Conference champion

The 2012 Brown Bears football team represented Brown University in the 2012 NCAA Division I FCS football season. They were led by 15th year head coach Phil Estes and played their home games at Brown Stadium. They are a member of the Ivy League. They finished the season 7–3, 4–3 in Ivy League play to finish in a three way tie for third place. Brown averaged 6,871 fans per game.

== Schedule ==
Date	Time	Opponent	Site	TV	Result	Attendance
September 15	1:00 p.m.	at Holy Cross*	Fitton Field; Worcester, MA		W 24–21	5,684
September 22	4:30 p.m.	Harvard	Brown Stadium; Providence, RI	NBCSN	L 31–45	13,848
September 29	2:00 p.m.	at Georgetown*	Multi-Sport Field; Washington, D.C.		W 37–10	3,215
October 6	1:00 p.m.	at Rhode Island*	Meade Stadium; Kingston, RI		W 17–7	3,305
October 13	12:00 p.m.	at Princeton	Powers Field at Princeton Stadium; Princeton, NJ	NBCSN	L 0–19	6,482
October 20	12:30 p.m.	Cornell	Brown Stadium; Providence, RI		W 21–14	4,098
October 27	1:00 p.m.	at Penn	Franklin Field; Philadelphia, PA	Penn Sports Network	L 17–20	13,569
November 3	12:30 p.m.	Yale	Brown Stadium; Providence, RI	YES	W 20–0	6,512
November 10	1:30 p.m.	at Dartmouth	Memorial Field; Hanover, NH		W 28–24	3,439
November 17	12:30 p.m.	Columbia	Brown Stadium; Providence, RI		W 22–6	3,028
*Non-conference game; All times are in Eastern time

- Source: Schedule
