= 2012 Yale Bulldogs football team =

American college football season

2012 Yale Bulldogs football
- Conference: Ivy League
- Record: 2–8 (1–6 Ivy)
- Head coach: Tony Reno (1st season)
- Offensive coordinator: Kevin Morris (1st season)
- Offensive scheme: Pro-style
- Defensive coordinator: Rick Flanders (1st season)
- Base defense: 4–3
- Home stadium: Yale Bowl

2012 Ivy League football standings
	Conf.			Overall
Team	W		L	W		L
Penn $	6	–	1	6	–	4
Harvard	5	–	2	8	–	2
Brown	4	–	3	7	–	3
Dartmouth	4	–	3	6	–	4
Princeton	4	–	3	5	–	5
Cornell	2	–	5	4	–	6
Columbia	2	–	5	3	–	7
Yale	1	–	6	2	–	8
$ – Conference champion

The 2012 Yale Bulldogs football team represented Yale University in the 2012 NCAA Division I FCS football season. They were led by first year head coach Tony Reno and played their home games at the Yale Bowl. They are a member of the Ivy League. They finished the season 2–8, 1–6 in Ivy League play to finish in last place. Yale averaged 12,453 fans per game.

== Schedule ==
Date	Time	Opponent	Site	TV	Result	Attendance
September 15	1:00 p.m.	at Georgetown*	Multi-Sport Field; Washington, DC		W 24–21	2,689
September 22	1:00 p.m.	at Cornell	Schoellkopf Field; Ithaca, NY	NBCSN	L 6–45	15,333
September 29	12:00 p.m.	Colgate*	Yale Bowl; New Haven, CT		L 24–47	5,860
October 6	12:00 p.m.	Dartmouth	Yale Bowl; New Haven, CT		L 14–34	11,235
October 13	12:00 p.m.	Lafayette*	Yale Bowl; New Haven, CT	MASN	L 10–20	9,118
October 20	12:00 p.m.	Penn	Yale Bowl; New Haven, CT	NBCSN	W 24–13	14,229
October 27	12:30 p.m.	at Columbia	Robert K. Kraft Field at Lawrence A. Wien Stadium; New York, NY	YES	L 22–26	4,130
November 3	12:30 p.m.	at Brown	Brown Stadium; Providence, RI	YES	L 0–20	6,512
November 10	12:00 p.m.	Princeton	Yale Bowl; New Haven, CT (rivalry)	YES	L 7–29	21,824
November 17	12:00 p.m.	at Harvard	Harvard Stadium; Boston, MA (rivalry)	NBCSN	L 24–34	31,123
*Non-conference game; All times are in Eastern time

== Roster ==
2012 Yale Bulldogs football team roster
Players
Coaches
Offense

Pos.	#	Name	Class
OL	67	William Chism	So
OL	57	Roy Collins	Sr
TE	86	Adam Conklin	So
WR	7	Henry Furman	Jr
OL	79	Wes Gavin	Jr
WR	80	Allen Harris	Sr
TB	35	Tate Harshbarger	Jr
OL	65	Luke Hartwig	Sr
OL	62	Derrek Ross	Fr
OL	72	Dustin Ross	Fr
WR	81	John Runk	Sr
WR	13	Derek Russell	Sr
WR	9	Cameron Sandquist	Jr
TB	30	Tyler Varga	So
WR	29	Grant Wallace	So
QB	8	Eric Williams	Fr

Defense

Pos.	#	Name	Class
LB	22	Charles Cook	So
NG	97	Nick Daffin	Sr
DE	45	Allen Davis	Sr
NG	94	Chris Dooley	Sr
LB	99	Dylan Drake	Sr

Special teams

Pos.	#	Name	Class

Head coach

- Tony Reno

Coordinators/assistant coaches

Legend

- (C) Team captain
- (S) Suspended
- (I) Ineligible
- Injured
- Redshirt

Roster
