= 2012 Lafayette Leopards football team =

American college football season

2012 Lafayette Leopards football
- Conference: Patriot League
- Record: 5–6 (2–4 Patriot)
- Head coach: Frank Tavani (13th season)
- Offensive coordinator: Mickey Fein (4th season)
- Defensive coordinator: John Loose (13th season)
- Home stadium: Fisher Stadium

2012 Patriot League football standings
	Conf.			Overall
Team	W		L	W		L
No. 24 Colgate $^	6	–	0	8	–	4
No. 13 Lehigh	5	–	1	10	–	1
Georgetown	2	–	4	5	–	6
Lafayette	2	–	4	5	–	6
Holy Cross	2	–	4	2	–	9
Bucknell	1	–	5	3	–	8
Fordham	0	–	0	6	–	5
$ – Conference champion; ^ – FCS playoff participant; Fordham was ineligible for conference title because they offered football scholarships while other Patriot League members did not.; Rankings from The Sports Network poll

The 2012 Lafayette Leopards football team represented Lafayette College as member of the Patriot League during the 2012 NCAA Division I FCS football season. Led by 13th-year head coach Frank Tavani, the Leopards compiled an overall record of 5–6 with a mark of 2–4 in conference play, placing in a three-way tie for third in the Patriot League. Lafayette played home games at Fisher Field in Easton, Pennsylvania.

== Schedule ==
Date	Time	Opponent	Site	TV	Result	Attendance
September 8	7:00 pm	at William & Mary*	Zable Stadium; Williamsburg, VA	LSN/MASN	W 17–14	7,615
September 15	6:00 pm	Penn*	Fisher Stadium; Easton, PA	LSN	W 28–21	8,376
September 22	12:00 pm	at Bucknell	Christy Mathewson–Memorial Stadium; Lewisburg, PA	CBSSN	W 20–14	5,254
September 29	6:00 pm	at Robert Morris*	Joe Walton Stadium; Moon Township, PA	LSN	L 28–31	3,524
October 6	6:00 pm	Princeton*	Fisher Stadium; Easton, PA	LSN	L 14–35	6,821
October 13	12:00 pm	at Yale*	Yale Bowl; New Haven, CT	MASN/LSN	W 20–10	9,118
October 20	1:00 pm	Holy Cross^{†}	Fisher Stadium; Easton, PA	LSN	W 30–13	8,521
October 27	6:00 pm	Georgetown	Fisher Stadium; Easton, PA	LSN	L 17–20	6,817
November 3	12:30 pm	at Colgate	Andy Kerr Stadium; Hamilton, NY	MASN/LSN	L 41–65	1,945
November 10	12:30 pm	at Fordham	Coffey Field; Bronx, NY	MASN/LSN	L 27–36	5,128
November 17	1:00 pm	No. 14 Lehigh	Fisher Stadium; Easton, PA (The Rivalry)	LSN/WFMZ/MASN2	L 21–38	13,596
*Non-conference game; ^{†}Homecoming; Rankings from The Sports Network Poll released prior to the game; All times are in Eastern time
