= Greenlight Networks =

Fiber-optic Internet service provider in New York state

- Company type: Private
- Industry: Telecommunications
- Founded: 2011
- Headquarters: Rochester, NY, United States
- Key people: Mark Murphy
- Products: Fiber Internet
- Website: Greenlight Networks

Greenlight Networks is a fiber-optic Internet service provider in Rochester, New York, and the Buffalo Niagara Region. The company was founded in 2011 and competes with Frontier Telephone of Rochester, Verizon Fios and Charter Spectrum.

In 2024 it was ranked by Consumer Reports as the country's top internet service provider.

== History ==
Greenlight was founded in 2011 by Mark Murphy and began offering 1 Gigabit fiber optic internet service in 2012. The service began mostly confined to areas east of the Genesee River due to financial constraints with building new fiber optic lines particularity in Rochester's suburbs and getting permission the various towns and from Rochester Gas and Electric to use their existing poles. In 2018, the company was purchased by local billionaire businessman and philanthropist Tom Golisano. Following Golisano's purchase of the company it began to rapidly expand across the west side of the market. The company determines where it will expand to by the amount of signups for the service a particular area has.

In December 2019, it was announced that Greenlight would be expanding into the Buffalo Niagara Region in 2020.

In 2022, Golisano sold his controlling equity shares of Greenlight Networks to Oak Hill Capital Partners.

In July 2025, Greenlight Networks announced it would be acquiring Loop Internet, an internet service provider serving Northeastern Pennsylvania.

== Future expansion ==
Greenlight’s website suggests the company is looking into future long-term expansion into areas such as Albany, Binghamton, Ithaca, Syracuse, and the Finger Lakes Region as well as Bridgeport, Danbury, Hartford, New Haven, and Stamford in Connecticut.
