= 2012 Columbia Lions football team =

American college football season

2012 Columbia Lions football
- Conference: Ivy League
- Record: 3–7 (2–5 Ivy)
- Head coach: Pete Mangurian (1st season)
- Offensive coordinator: Jaime Elizondo (1st season)
- Defensive coordinator: Kevin Lempa (1st season)
- Home stadium: Robert K. Kraft Field at Lawrence A. Wien Stadium

2012 Ivy League football standings
	Conf.			Overall
Team	W		L	W		L
Penn $	6	–	1	6	–	4
Harvard	5	–	2	8	–	2
Brown	4	–	3	7	–	3
Dartmouth	4	–	3	6	–	4
Princeton	4	–	3	5	–	5
Cornell	2	–	5	4	–	6
Columbia	2	–	5	3	–	7
Yale	1	–	6	2	–	8
$ – Conference champion

The 2012 Columbia Lions football team represented Columbia University as a member of Ivy League during the 2012 NCAA Division I FCS football season. Led by first-year head coach Pete Mangurian, the Lions compiled an overall record of 3–7 with a mark of 2–5 in conference play, tying for sixth place in the Ivy League. The team played home games at Robert K. Kraft Field at Lawrence A. Wien Stadium in Manhattan. Columbia averaged 5,599 fans per game.

== Schedule ==
Date	Time	Opponent	Site	TV	Result	Attendance
September 15	12:30 p.m.	Marist*	Robert K. Kraft Field at Lawrence A. Wien Stadium; New York, NY		W 10–9	3,933
September 22	12:30 p.m.	Fordham*	Robert K. Kraft Field at Lawrence A. Wien Stadium; New York, NY (Liberty Cup)		L 13–20	4,318
September 29	12:30 p.m.	Princeton	Robert K. Kraft Field at Lawrence A. Wien Stadium; New York, NY		L 6–33	4,469
October 6	12:30 p.m.	at No. 11 Lehigh*	Goodman Stadium; Bethlehem, PA	2 Sports	L 14–35	5,025
October 13	1:00 p.m.	at Penn	Franklin Field; Philadelphia, PA	Penn Sports Network	L 20–24	6,189
October 20	1:30 p.m.	Dartmouth^{†}	Robert K. Kraft Field at Lawrence A. Wien Stadium; New York, NY		L 16–21	11,127
October 27	12:30 p.m.	Yale	Robert K. Kraft Field at Lawrence A. Wien Stadium; New York, NY	YES	W 26–22	4,130
November 3	1:00 p.m.	at Harvard	Harvard Stadium; Boston, MA		L 0–69	5,838
November 10	12:30 p.m.	Cornell	Robert K. Kraft Field at Lawrence A. Wien Stadium; New York, NY (rivalry)		W 34–17	5,620
November 17	12:30 p.m.	at Brown	Brown Stadium; Providence, RI		L 6–22	3,028
*Non-conference game; ^{†}Homecoming; Rankings from The Sports Network Poll released prior to the game; All times are in Eastern time
