= John Walson =

American inventor (1915–1983)

John Walson, Sr. (born John Walsonavich; March 25, 1915 – March 27, 1993) was an American appliance store owner. Based in Mahanoy City, Pennsylvania, Walson worked for Pennsylvania Power & Light before starting a General Electric franchise out of his home in 1945. He founded Service Electric in 1948; the family-owned cable television provider services Pennsylvania and northwestern New Jersey.

Walson is widely considered to have invented cable television in 1948. The popular account involves him solving problems receiving radio signals from Philadelphia television stations, which were blocked by mountaintops. His claim is recognized by the U.S. Congress and the National Cable Television Association and has been repeated by journalists and scholarly sources alike. However, it has also been contested; research arguing against Walson's claim was published in the Journal of Broadcasting & Electronic Media in 1996.

== Early life and education ==
John Walsonavich was born in Forest City, Pennsylvania on March 25, 1915, to Andrew and Anastasia Walsonavich. According to Service Electric, his family moved to Mahanoy City, Pennsylvania and he graduated from the local high school. He briefly attended Loyola University Chicago before moving to the Coyne Electrical School. Returning to Mahanoy City in 1934, Walsonavich began working as a lineman and occasional repairman for Pennsylvania Power & Light (PP&L). In 1945, PP&L left the appliances business, leading Walsonavich to begin running a General Electric franchise out of his home with the help of his newlywed wife, Margaret Walsonavich née Kowatch, while also continuing with PP&L. As an adult, Walsonavich legally changed his surname to Walson.

== Invention of cable television ==
Walson needed to solve problems receiving signals from Philadelphia television stations, which were blocked by the mountains surrounding the town. Walson erected an antenna on a utility pole on a local mountaintop that enabled him to demonstrate the televisions in his store with strong broadcasts coming from the three Philadelphia stations. He connected the antenna to his appliance store via a cable and modified signal boosters. He then connected several of his customers who were located along the cable path. This was the first community antenna television (CATV) system in the United States.

Walson's company grew over the years, and he is recognized as the founder of the cable television industry. He was also the first cable operator to use microwave to import distant television stations, the first to use coaxial cable to improve picture quality, and the first to distribute pay television programming.

His descendants now own Service Electric, which is a family-owned cable TV provider serving Pennsylvania and Northwestern New Jersey.

In 2026, Walson was announced as a posthumous inductee into the Luzerne County Arts & Entertainment Hall of Fame.
