= 2012 Dartmouth Big Green football team =

American college football season

2012 Dartmouth Big Green football
- Conference: Ivy League
- Record: 6–4 (4–3 Ivy)
- Head coach: Buddy Teevens (13th season)
- Offensive coordinator: Keith Clark (3rd season)
- Offensive scheme: Multiple
- Defensive coordinator: Don Dobes (3rd season)
- Base defense: 4–3
- Home stadium: Memorial Field

2012 Ivy League football standings
	Conf.			Overall
Team	W		L	W		L
Penn $	6	–	1	6	–	4
Harvard	5	–	2	8	–	2
Brown	4	–	3	7	–	3
Dartmouth	4	–	3	6	–	4
Princeton	4	–	3	5	–	5
Cornell	2	–	5	4	–	6
Columbia	2	–	5	3	–	7
Yale	1	–	6	2	–	8
$ – Conference champion

The 2012 Dartmouth Big Green football team represented Dartmouth College in the 2012 NCAA Division I FCS football season. The Big Green were led by head coach Buddy Teevens in his eighth straight year and 13th overall and played their home games at Memorial Field. They are a member of the Ivy League. They finished the season 6–4 overall and 4–3 in Ivy League play to place in a three-way tie for third. Dartmouth averaged 6,402 fans per game.

== Schedule ==
Date	Time	Opponent	Site	TV	Result	Attendance
September 15	7:00 p.m.	Butler*	Memorial Field; Hanover, NH		W 35–7	9,089
September 22	1:00 p.m.	at Holy Cross*	Fitton Field; Worcester, MA	Charter TV3	W 13–10	9,574
September 29	12:00 p.m.	Penn	Memorial Field; Hanover, NH	NBCSN	L 21–28	5,873
October 6	12:00 p.m.	at Yale	Yale Bowl; New Haven, CT		W 34–14	11,235
October 13	1:30 p.m.	Sacred Heart*	Memorial Field; Hanover, NH		L 10–27	3,473
October 20	1:30 p.m.	at Columbia	Robert K. Kraft Field at Lawrence A. Wien Stadium; New York, NY		W 21–16	11,127
October 27	5:00 p.m.	Harvard^{†}	Memorial Field; Hanover, NH (rivalry)	CSNNE	L 14–31	10,138
November 3	12:30 p.m.	at Cornell	Schoellkopf Field; Ithaca, NY (rivalry)		W 44–28	4,106
November 10	1:30 p.m.	Brown	Memorial Field; Hanover, NH		L 24–28	3,439
November 17	1:00 p.m.	at Princeton	Powers Field at Princeton Stadium; Princeton, NJ		W 35–21	8,327
*Non-conference game; ^{†}Homecoming; All times are in Eastern time
