= 2012 Georgetown Hoyas football team =

American college football season

2012 Georgetown Hoyas football
- Conference: Patriot League
- Record: 5–6 (2–4 Patriot)
- Head coach: Kevin Kelly (7th season)
- Offensive coordinator: Vinny Marino (1st season)
- Defensive coordinator: Rob Sgarlata (7th season)
- Home stadium: Multi-Sport Field

2012 Patriot League football standings
	Conf.			Overall
Team	W		L	W		L
No. 24 Colgate $^	6	–	0	8	–	4
No. 13 Lehigh	5	–	1	10	–	1
Georgetown	2	–	4	5	–	6
Lafayette	2	–	4	5	–	6
Holy Cross	2	–	4	2	–	9
Bucknell	1	–	5	3	–	8
Fordham	0	–	0	6	–	5
$ – Conference champion; ^ – FCS playoff participant; Fordham was ineligible for conference title because they offered football scholarships while other Patriot League members did not.; Rankings from The Sports Network poll

The 2012 Georgetown Hoyas football team represented Georgetown University as a member of the Patriot League during the 2012 NCAA Division I FCS football season. Led by seventh-year head coach Kevin Kelly, the Hoyas compiled an overall record of 5–6 with a mark of 2–4 in conference play, placing in a three-way tie for third in the Patriot League. Georgetown played home games at Multi-Sport Field in Washington, D.C.

== Schedule ==
Date	Time	Opponent	Site	TV	Result	Attendance
September 1	6:00 pm	at Davidson*	Richardson Stadium; Davidson, NC		W 35–14	4,011
September 8	1:00 pm	Wagner*	Multi-Sport Field; Washington, DC		W 13–10	2,147
September 15	1:00 pm	Yale*	Multi-Sport Field; Washington, DC		L 21–24	2,689
September 21	7:00 pm	at Princeton*	Powers Field at Princeton Stadium; Princeton, NJ	ESPNU	W 21–20	6,792
September 29	2:00 pm	Brown*	Multi-Sport Field; Washington, DC		L 10–37	3,215
October 6	1:00 pm	at Fordham	Coffey Field; Bronx, NY		L 31–38	3,639
October 13	1:00 pm	No. 10 Lehigh	Multi-Sport Field; Washington, DC		L 14–17	2,684
October 20	1:00 pm	at Colgate	Andy Kerr Stadium; Hamilton, NY		L 36–57	1,832
October 27	6:00 pm	at Lafayette	Fisher Stadium; Easton, PA		W 20–17	6,817
November 10	1:00 pm	Bucknell	Multi-Sport Field; Washington, DC		W 10–3	1,934
November 17	1:00 pm	Holy Cross	Multi-Sport Field; Washington, DC		L 0–24	1,789
*Non-conference game; Rankings from The Sports Network Poll released prior to the game; All times are in Eastern time
