= Loop Internet =

American internet service provider

- Company type: Private
- Industry: Telecommunications
- Founded: 2015; 11 years ago
- Founder: Chris Hacken
- Headquarters: Scranton, Pennsylvania, U.S.
- Area served: Northeastern Pennsylvania
- Services: Fiber-optic internet
- Owner: Greenlight Networks (2025-present)
- Website: www.loopinternet.com

Loop Internet is a fiber-optic internet service provider based in Scranton, Pennsylvania.

== History ==
The company was founded in 2015 with the goal of expanding high-speed internet access throughout Luzerne and Lackawanna counties. It provides residential and business internet services and has been expanding its fiber network in under-served areas of Northeastern Pennsylvania.

In April 2023, The Scranton Times-Tribune reported that Loop Internet was preparing to bring a new fiber-optic internet option to Scranton, aiming to offer symmetrical high-speed service in competition with legacy internet providers.

In December 2024, the firm began service in Mountain Top, covering Rice, Wright, and Fairview townships, as well as Nuangola borough. The following month, it announced plans to expand further across Luzerne County, including communities such as Forty Fort, Swoyersville, Luzerne, Butler Township, Sugarloaf, Conyngham, Hazle Township, Freeland, and Nanticoke.

In July 2025, Loop announced it would be acquired by Greenlight Networks. In October, it was announced that this transaction had been completed.

== Services ==
Loop Internet offers fiber-optic broadband with symmetrical upload and download speeds. The service is aimed at both residential and commercial customers. While pricing plans and technical specifications vary, the company’s entry into the market has been framed as a competitive alternative to incumbent providers.

== See also ==
- Service Electric
