= 2012 Colgate Raiders football team =

American college football season

2012 Colgate Raiders football

Patriot League champion

FCS Playoffs First Round, L 21–30 vs. Wagner
- Conference: Patriot League

Ranking
- Sports Network: No. 24
- FCS Coaches: No. 25
- Record: 8–4 (6–0 Patriot)
- Head coach: Dick Biddle (17th season)
- Offensive coordinator: Dan Hunt (7th season)
- Co-defensive coordinators: Pat Foley (3rd season); Ryan Knowles (4th season)
- Home stadium: Andy Kerr Stadium

2012 Patriot League football standings
	Conf.			Overall
Team	W		L	W		L
No. 24 Colgate $^	6	–	0	8	–	4
No. 13 Lehigh	5	–	1	10	–	1
Georgetown	2	–	4	5	–	6
Lafayette	2	–	4	5	–	6
Holy Cross	2	–	4	2	–	9
Bucknell	1	–	5	3	–	8
Fordham	0	–	0	6	–	5
$ – Conference champion; ^ – FCS playoff participant; Fordham was ineligible for conference title because they offered football scholarships while other Patriot League members did not.; Rankings from The Sports Network poll

The 2012 Colgate Raiders football team represented Colgate University in the 2012 NCAA Division I FCS football season. They were led by 17th-year head coach Dick Biddle and played their home games at Andy Kerr Stadium. They were a member of the Patriot League. They finished the season 8–4, 6–0 in Patriot League play to be crowned Patriot League champions. They earned the League's automatic bid into the FCS playoffs where they lost in the first round to Wagner.

== Schedule ==
Date	Time	Opponent	Rank	Site	TV	Result	Attendance
September 1	6:00 pm	at Albany*		University Field; Albany, NY		L 23–40	6,194
September 8	3:00 pm	at South Dakota*		DakotaDome; Vermillion, SD		L 21–31	8,936
September 15	1:00 pm	Sacred Heart*		Andy Kerr Stadium; Hamilton, NY		W 35–14	5,438
September 22	6:00 pm	at No. 20 Stony Brook*		Kenneth P. LaValle Stadium; Stony Brook, NY		L 31–32	10,278
September 29	12:00 pm	at Yale*		Yale Bowl; New Haven, CT		W 47–24	5,860
October 13	1:00 pm	Holy Cross^{†}		Andy Kerr Stadium; Hamilton, NY		W 51–35	5,600
October 20	1:00 pm	Georgetown		Andy Kerr Stadium; Hamilton, NY		W 57–36	1,832
October 27	1:00 pm	at Bucknell		Christy Mathewson–Memorial Stadium; Lewisburg, PA		W 47–33	4,132
November 3	1:00 pm	Lafayette		Andy Kerr Stadium; Hamilton, NY		W 65–41	1,945
November 10	12:30 pm	at No. 8 Lehigh		Goodman Stadium; Bethlehem, PA	CBSSN	W 35–24	8,036
November 17	1:00 pm	at Fordham		Coffey Field; The Bronx, NY		W 41–39	4,056
November 24	12:00 pm	at Wagner*	No. 24	Wagner College Stadium; Staten Island, NY (NCAA Division I First Round)	ESPN3	L 20–31	3,032
*Non-conference game; ^{†}Homecoming; Rankings from The Sports Network Poll released prior to the game; All times are in Eastern time
