= 2012 Penn Quakers football team =

American college football season

2012 Penn Quakers football

Ivy League champion
- Conference: Ivy League
- Record: 6–4 (6–1 Ivy)
- Head coach: Al Bagnoli (21st season)
- Offensive coordinator: Jon McLaughlin (4th season)
- Defensive coordinator: Ray Priore (15th season)
- Home stadium: Franklin Field

2012 Ivy League football standings
	Conf.			Overall
Team	W		L	W		L
Penn $	6	–	1	6	–	4
Harvard	5	–	2	8	–	2
Brown	4	–	3	7	–	3
Dartmouth	4	–	3	6	–	4
Princeton	4	–	3	5	–	5
Cornell	2	–	5	4	–	6
Columbia	2	–	5	3	–	7
Yale	1	–	6	2	–	8
$ – Conference champion

The 2012 Penn Quakers football team represented the University of Pennsylvania in the 2012 NCAA Division I FCS football season. They were led by 21st-year head coach Al Bagnoli and played their home games at Franklin Field. They were a member of the Ivy League. They finished the season 6–4 overall 6–1 in Ivy League play to be crowned Ivy League champions. Penns average attendance for the season was 10,114 spectators.

== Schedule ==
Date	Time	Opponent	Site	TV	Result	Attendance
September 15	6:00 p.m.	at Lafayette*	Fisher Stadium; Easton, PA	Lafayette Sports Network/MASN	L 21–28	8,376
September 22	3:30 p.m.	Villanova*	Franklin Field; Philadelphia, PA	CSNPA	L 8–24	13,803
September 29	Noon	at Dartmouth	Memorial Field; Hanover, NH	NBCSN	W 28–21	5,873
October 6	3:30 p.m.	William & Mary*	Franklin Field; Philadelphia, PA	Penn Sports Network	L 28–34	8,101
October 13	1:00 p.m.	Columbia	Franklin Field; Philadelphia, PA	Penn Sports Network	W 24–20	6,189
October 20	Noon	at Yale	Yale Bowl; New Haven, CT	NBCSN	L 13–27	14,229
October 27	1:00 p.m.	Brown^{†}	Franklin Field; Philadelphia, PA	Penn Sports Network	W 20–17	13,569
November 3	1:00 p.m.	at Princeton	Powers Field at Princeton Stadium; Princeton, NJ (rivalry)	ESPN3	W 28–21	7,494
November 10	Noon	No. 25 Harvard	Franklin Field; Philadelphia, PA (rivalry)	NBCSN	W 30–21	8,910
November 17	12:30 p.m.	at Cornell	Schoellkopf Field; Ithaca, NY (rivalry)	ESPN3	W 35–28	3,876
*Non-conference game; ^{†}Homecoming; Rankings from The Sports Network Poll released prior to the game; All times are in Eastern time
