= 2012 Harvard Crimson football team =

American college football season

2012 Harvard Crimson football
- Conference: Ivy League

Ranking
- FCS Coaches: No. 23
- Record: 8–2 (5–2 Ivy)
- Head coach: Tim Murphy (19th season)
- Offensive coordinator: Joel Lamb (7th season)
- Offensive scheme: Spread
- Defensive coordinator: Scott Larkee (4th season)
- Base defense: 4–3
- Home stadium: Harvard Stadium

2012 Ivy League football standings
	Conf.			Overall
Team	W		L	W		L
Penn $	6	–	1	6	–	4
Harvard	5	–	2	8	–	2
Brown	4	–	3	7	–	3
Dartmouth	4	–	3	6	–	4
Princeton	4	–	3	5	–	5
Cornell	2	–	5	4	–	6
Columbia	2	–	5	3	–	7
Yale	1	–	6	2	–	8
$ – Conference champion

The 2012 Harvard Crimson football team represented Harvard University in the 2012 NCAA Division I FCS football season. They were led by 19th-year head coach Tim Murphy and played their home games at Harvard Stadium. They were a member of the Ivy League. They finished the season 8–2 overall 5–2 in Ivy League play to place second. Harvard averaged 11,519 fans per game.

== Schedule ==
Date	Time	Opponent	Rank	Site	TV	Result	Attendance
September 15	1:00 p.m.	San Diego*		Harvard Stadium; Boston, MA		W 28–13	5,272
September 22	4:30 p.m.	at Brown		Brown Stadium; Providence, RI	NBCSN	W 45–31	13,848
September 28	7:00 p.m.	Holy Cross*		Harvard Stadium; Boston, MA		W 52–3	10,215
October 6	1:00 p.m.	Cornell	No. 25	Harvard Stadium; Boston, MA		W 45–13	7,112
October 13	3:30 p.m.	Bucknell*	No. 22	Harvard Stadium; Boston, MA	CBSSN	W 35–7	9,558
October 20	1:00 p.m.	at Princeton	No. 22	Powers Field at Princeton Stadium; Princeton, NJ (rivalry)	ESPN3	L 34–39	10,823
October 27	5:00 p.m.	at Dartmouth		Memorial Field; Hanover, NH (rivalry)	CSNNE	W 31–14	10,138
November 3	1:00 p.m.	Columbia		Harvard Stadium; Boston, MA		W 69–0	5,838
November 10	12:00 p.m.	at Penn	No. 25	Franklin Field; Philadelphia, PA (rivalry)	NBCSN	L 21–30	8,910
November 17	12:00 p.m.	Yale		Harvard Stadium; Boston, MA (rivalry)	NBCSN	W 34–24	31,123
*Non-conference game; Rankings from The Sports Network Poll released prior to the game; All times are in Eastern time

== Rankings ==
Ranking movements Legend: ██ Increase in ranking ██ Decrease in ranking RV = Received votes
	Week																
Poll	Pre	1	2	3	4	5	6	7	8	9	10	11	12	13	14	15	Final
Sports Network	25	RV	RV	RV	RV	25	22	22	RV	RV	25	RV	RV				
Coaches	22	23	24	24	24	23	21	20	24	21	16	24	23				
