= 2012 Cornell Big Red football team =

American college football season

2012 Cornell Big Red football
- Conference: Ivy League
- Record: 4–6 (2–5 Ivy)
- Head coach: Kent Austin (3rd season)
- Offensive coordinator: Jeff Fela (3rd season)
- Defensive coordinator: Kim Dameron (1st season)
- Captains: Brett Buehler; Bob Bullington; Michael Hernandez; Jeff Mathews; Tre' Minor; Luke Tasker
- Home stadium: Schoellkopf Field

2012 Ivy League football standings
	Conf.			Overall
Team	W		L	W		L
Penn $	6	–	1	6	–	4
Harvard	5	–	2	8	–	2
Brown	4	–	3	7	–	3
Dartmouth	4	–	3	6	–	4
Princeton	4	–	3	5	–	5
Cornell	2	–	5	4	–	6
Columbia	2	–	5	3	–	7
Yale	1	–	6	2	–	8
$ – Conference champion

The 2012 Cornell Big Red football team represented Cornell University in the 2012 NCAA Division I FCS football season as a member of the Ivy League. They were led by third-year head coach Kent Austin and played their home games at Schoellkopf Field. Cornell finished the season 4–6 overall and 2–5 in Ivy League play to tie for sixth.

== Schedule ==
Date	Time	Opponent	Site	TV	Result	Attendance
September 15	1:00 p.m.	at Fordham*	Coffey Field; The Bronx, NY		L 27–34	6,087
September 22	1:00 p.m.	Yale	Schoellkopf Field; Ithaca, NY		W 45–6	15,333
September 29	6:00 p.m.	at Bucknell*	Christy Mathewson–Memorial Stadium; Lewisburg, PA		W 15–10	3,417
October 6	1:00 p.m.	at No. 25 Harvard	Harvard Stadium; Boston, MA	NBCSN	L 13–45	7,112
October 13	12:30 p.m.	Monmouth*	Schoellkopf Field; Ithaca, NY		W 41–38	6,189
October 20	12:30 p.m.	at Brown	Brown Stadium; Providence, RI		L 14–21	4,098
October 27	12:30 p.m.	Princeton	Schoellkopf Field; Ithaca, NY		W 37–35	4,420
November 3	12:30 p.m.	Dartmouth	Schoellkopf Field; Ithaca, NY (rivalry)		L 28–44	4,106
November 10	12:30 p.m.	at Columbia	Robert K. Kraft Field at Lawrence A. Wien Stadium; New York, NY (rivalry)		L 17–34	5,620
November 17	12:30 p.m.	Penn	Schoellkopf Field; Ithaca, NY (rivalry)		L 28–35	3,876
*Non-conference game; Rankings from The Sports Network Poll released prior to the game; All times are in Eastern time
