= Mike Catapano =

American football player (born 1990)

No. 77, 53
- Position: Linebacker

Personal information
- Born: August 17, 1990 (age 36); Long Island, New York, U.S.
- Listed height: 6 ft 4 in (1.93 m)
- Listed weight: 270 lb (122 kg)

Career information
- High school: Chaminade (Mineola, New York)
- College: Princeton
- NFL draft: 2013: 7th round, 207th overall pick

Career history
- Kansas City Chiefs (2013–2014); New York Jets (2015−2016); Houston Texans (2017)*
- * Offseason or practice squad member only

Awards and highlights
- Ivy League Defensive Player of the Year (2012); First-team All-Ivy (2012); East-West Shrine Game (2013)

Career NFL statistics
- Total tackles: 11
- Sacks: 2
- Stats at Pro Football Reference

Mike Catapano Jr. (born August 17, 1990) is an American former professional football player who was a linebacker in the National Football League (NFL). He played college football for the Princeton Tigers where he majored in psychology. He was selected in the seventh round of the 2013 NFL draft by the Kansas City Chiefs, with whom he began his career. After two seasons in Kansas City, he spent two seasons with the New York Jets.

== Early life ==
Catapano, nicknamed "the Admiral", was born the son of Mike Sr. and Barbara. He has a younger sister April. He is from Bayville, New York. Catapano began playing football at age 8, when his mother became worried he was being bullied. He attended Chaminade High School in Mineola, New York, where he played more fullback than defensive end. He had three shoulder surgeries in high school, which limited his recruiting potential. According to a 2013 NFL.com report by Gil Brandt, he graduated weighing a 215 pounds (98 kg) and received offers from every Ivy League school. However, according to the class of 2008 databases of the major recruiting websites (ESPN.com, Rivals.com, and Scout.com) who also noted his offers from Army, Temple and Hofstra, he weighed between 234 and 240. According to the final national class of 2008 rankings, Catapano was the 18th ranked fullback by Scout.com and the 46th ranked fullback according to ESPN.

College recruiting
| Name | Hometown | School | Height | Weight | 40^{‡} | Commit date |
|---|---|---|---|---|---|---|
| Mike Catapano; FB | Bayville, New York | Chaminade (NY) | 6 ft 3.5 in (1.92 m) | 237 lb (108 kg) | 4.7 | Jan 8, 2008 |
| Mike Catapano; FB | Recruit ratings: Scout: Rivals: (65) | | | | | |
Overall recruit ranking: Scout: 18 (FB) ESPN: 46 (FB)
Note: In many cases, Scout, Rivals, 247Sports, On3, and ESPN may conflict in their listings of height and weight.; In these cases, the average was taken. ESPN grades are on a 100-point scale.; Sources: "Princeton Football Commitments". Rivals.; "2008 Princeton Football Commits". Scout.; "ESPN". ESPN.; "Scout.com Team Recruiting Rankings". Scout.; "2008 Team Ranking". Rivals.com.

== College career ==
As a freshman, he received a medical redshirt. As a redshirt sophomore, he earned honorable mention All-Ivy League honors. After his junior season in which he earned second-team All-Ivy honors, he attended a summer pass rush training camp conducted by Chuck Smith. Over the course of the year, he had 12 quarterback sacks and 15.5 tackles for a loss and participated in the 2013 East–West Shrine Game. His senior thesis was on visual cognition and memory. He was the 2012 Ivy League Defensive Player of the Year. At Princeton, he developed his own catchphrase to live by: "Attack the now". He was an FCS second-team All-American according to the Associated Press and third-team All-American according to Beyond Sports Network.

== Professional career ==
=== Pre-draft ===
Pre-draft measurables
| Height | Weight | 40-yard dash | 20-yard shuttle | Three-cone drill | Vertical jump | Broad jump | Bench press |
|---|---|---|---|---|---|---|---|
| 6 3 7/8 | 271 lb (123 kg) | 4.75 s | 4.31 s | 7.09 s | 37.5 in (0.95 m) | 9 ft 8 in (2.95 m) | 33 reps |
All values from Princeton Pro Day on March 20, 2013.

Princeton held its Pro Day workouts on March 20, 2013 and Catapano had private workouts on March 26 with the Philadelphia Eagles and the Minnesota Vikings. Following his East-West Shrine Game appearance, his private workouts and his pro day workouts, there was speculation that he might be the highest drafted Ivy League athlete. He ended up as the third and final Ivy Leaguer of the 2013 draft, following J. C. Tretter and Kyle Juszczyk.

=== Kansas City Chiefs ===
He was selected by the Chiefs with the first pick of the seventh round and 207th overall selection of the 2013 NFL draft. He is the first Princeton athlete selected in the NFL Draft since Dennis Norman in the 2001 NFL draft. Upon being drafted, Catapano was expected to transition to the linebacker position. During the 2013 preseason, he moved back to defensive end. In Week 4, Catapano recorded a tackle against the New York Giants, his first in the NFL. In a Week 6 game against the Oakland Raiders, he recorded his first career sack.

Following the 2014 preseason, Catapano was placed on the Reserve/Non-football injury list. It was later reported that Catapano was fighting a mysterious illness that is still being researched. On September 26, 2014, Catapano was placed on season-ending injured reserve.

On September 5, 2015, Catapano was released by the Chiefs.

=== New York Jets ===
Following his release, Chiefs head coach Andy Reid felt Catapano was better suited to a team that ran a 4–3 defense rather than the Chief's 3–4 defense. On September 8, 2015, he was signed to the practice squad by the New York Jets. On November 21, 2015, he was promoted to the active roster when Sheldon Richardson was injured.

Catapano appeared in 11 games in 2016 with four starts before being placed on injured reserve on December 20, 2016.

=== Houston Texans ===
On August 23, 2017, Catapano signed with the Houston Texans. He was released on September 2, 2017.
