= Service Electric =

American cable television company

Service Electric Cable TV, Inc.
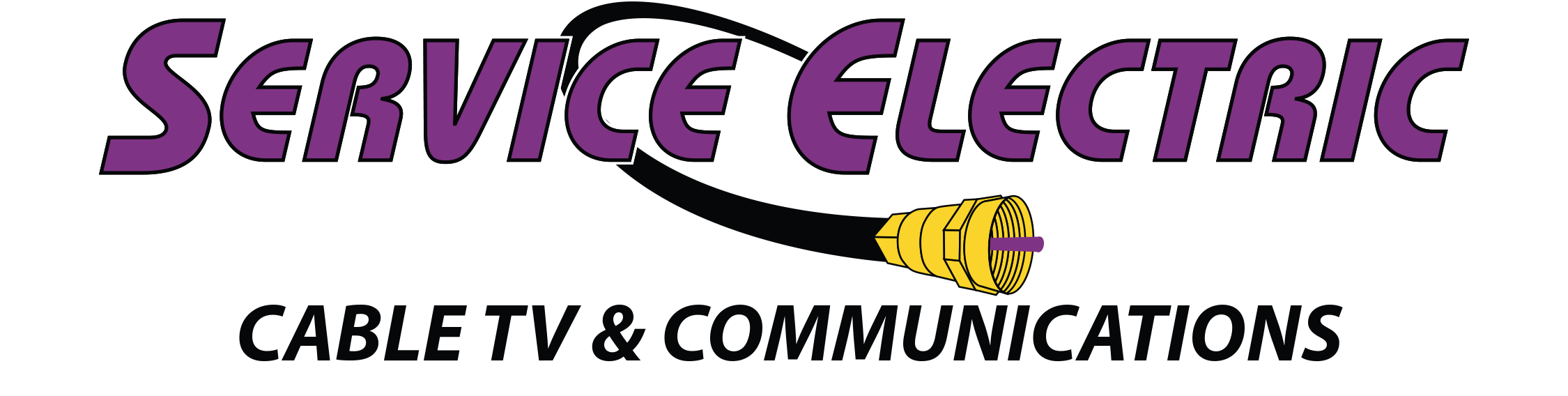
- Type: Private
- Industry: Telecommunications
- Founded: 1948; 78 years ago in Mahanoy City, Pennsylvania, U.S.
- Headquarters: 2260 Avenue A, Bethlehem, Pennsylvania, U.S.
- Products: Cable television, cable telephony, internet service provider
- Owner: Service Electric Cable TV and Communications
- Website: sectv.com

Service Electric is a group of affiliated cable television companies serving eastern Pennsylvania and western New Jersey, United States. The company is headquartered in Bethlehem, Pennsylvania in the Lehigh Valley.

Service Electric also offers broadband Internet and telephone services through PenTeleData and Alianza, both of which are partner companies.

== Current affiliate systems ==
=== Service Electric Cable TV and Communications ===
- Lehigh Valley, Pennsylvania and Hunterdon and Warren counties in New Jersey
- Wilkes-Barre, Pennsylvania and surrounding communities in Luzerne County

=== Service Electric Cablevision ===
- Birdsboro, Pennsylvania and surrounding communities in Berks, Chester, and Lancaster counties
- Sunbury, Pennsylvania and surrounding communities in Columbia, Montour, Northumberland, Snyder, and Union counties
- Hazleton, Pennsylvania and surrounding communities in Carbon, Columbia, Luzerne, Northumberland, and Schuylkill counties

== Former affiliate systems ==
=== Service Electric Broadband Cable ===
- Sussex County, New Jersey (acquired by Altice USA (now legally named Optimum Communications) in 2020)

== History ==
The company was started in 1948 in Mahanoy City, Pennsylvania by John Walson, who owned a General Electric appliance store. At the time, the surrounding mountains in Schuylkill County made over-the-air reception from Philadelphia television stations difficult. Walson was interested in selling television sets through his store, and solved the problem by building an antenna on top of the mountain overlooking the town. He initially ran a cable to his warehouse and then to his appliance store, using boosters to enhance the signal. Along the way, he hooked up neighbors to the antenna system. Although there are others who have laid claim to the honor, Walson is often recognized for having built the first cable TV system in the United States. Until Walson's death, the company was known as Service Electric Cable TV, Inc., which was based in Bethlehem.

In early 2011, Service Electric commenced offloading cable systems from its Service Electric Cable Company affiliate. Service Electric Cable TV, Inc. was composed of three divisions, eventually becoming Service Electric Cable TV & Communications, Service Electric Cable TV of New Jersey, and Service Electric Cablevision.

The cable system in Wilkes-Barre and vicinity moved operations to Service Electric Cable TV & Communications, which is currently based in Bethlehem, Pennsylvania, and services the Lehigh Valley and Northeastern Pennsylvania regions in Pennsylvania, and Hunterdon and Warren counties in New Jersey.

On February 18, 2011 the Service Electric Cablevision affiliate acquired CATV Service Inc., based in Danville, Pennsylvania. The cable system in Mahanoy City became a sister company to Service Electric Cable TV & Communications, taking the name Service Electric Cablevision and serving Birdsboro, Hazleton, and Sunbury. John E. Walson, eldest son of John Walson, ran Service Electric Cable TV, Inc. for 38 years until his death in August 2012. John M. Walson has taken over the role of president since his father's death.

On July 13, 2020, Altice USA (now Optimum Communications), a cable, phone, and internet provider headquartered in Long Island City, New York, acquired Service Electric Cable TV of New Jersey, which serviced Sussex County, New Jersey, for $150 million.

== Service Electric Network (SEN) ==
The company's Lehigh Valley system operates Service Electric Network (SEN), a local origination cable television station. Service Electric Network carries local news and sports, including coverage of East Penn Conference high school football, boys' and girls' basketball, and wrestling, and some Lehigh University football games.

In 2008, Service Electric Network began carrying home games of the Lehigh Valley IronPigs, the AAA-level Minor League affiliate of the Philadelphia Phillies. The games are televised from Coca-Cola Park in Allentown. Service Electric Network also carries home games of the Lehigh Valley Phantoms, the AHL affiliate of the Philadelphia Flyers. The station has added coverage of the Reading Phillies, the Philadelphia Phillies' AA-level minor league baseball affiliate, and Bethlehem Steel FC soccer games. The network rebranded as Service Electric Network from TV2 Sports in May 2020.

== Market environment ==
In the Lehigh Valley, an overbuild environment exists in many communities in which subscribers can choose between two competing cable television providers. Service Electric and RCN offer similar but not duplicative programming packages. In Wilkes-Barre, Service Electric competes with newcomer Loop Internet, a local internet service provider specializing in fiber-optic communication including internet and telephone. In most other areas served by one of Service Electric's family of companies, the company is the only viable provider.
