= Multi-Use Games Area =

Sports venue

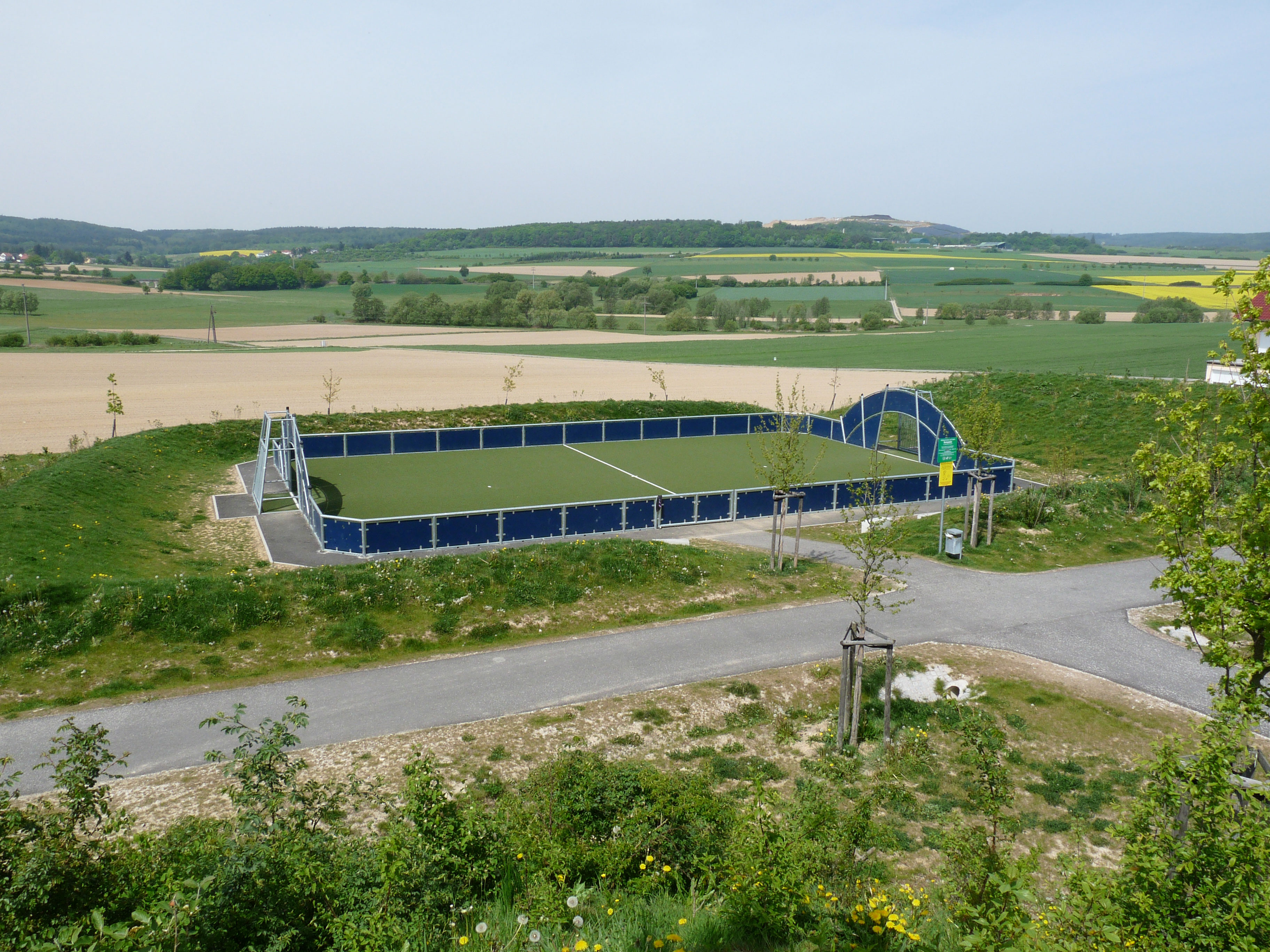
A MUGA surrounded by noise reducing earth walls.

A multi use games area (abbreviated MUGA) is an outdoor area with built-in goal post units for various types of sports games, such as football, basketball or tennis. MUGAs are often surrounded by a steel anti-vandal fence that also helps keep a ball in play inside the area. Many are established in municipal council parks, and are also often installed at schools. The term MUGA is mostly used in the United Kingdom.

== Sports ==
Sports MUGAs usually consist of a combination of a steel goal post and a basketball goal post. This may be senior, junior or match quality for basketball. Sports played on MUGAs are varied, hence the term multi-use. Basketball, football, hockey, netball, and volleyball, are usually provided with appropriate floor line markings for each sport, which are lined in different coloured paints.

== Construction ==
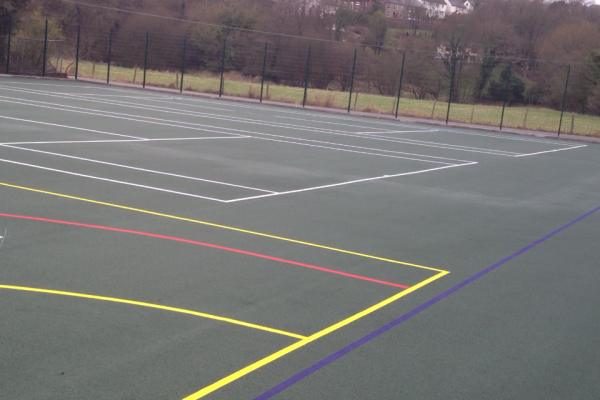
A multi use games area with line markings for sports.

MUGAs are placed into the ground around a sports surface area including natural grass, artificial sports surfaces, sports tiles, tarmac or concrete.

MUGAs are often supplied as ready-made solutions by various manufacturers. They can be supplied in half court (open on one end with one combination goal unit), full court (fully enclosed with two end goal units), and key area (open single goal end with key line markings). Some MUGAs are open-ended, partially closed or fully enclosed. Sizes vary from key area 6 by 7.5 metres (20 ft × 25 ft), tarmac key lined, half court 7.5 by 15 metres (25 ft × 49 ft), and full court 15 by 30 metres (49 ft × 98 ft).

Area can include producing goal posts, target panels, fencing and seating.

== Impacts ==
Positive results from United Kingdom local authorities can provide good evidence that placements of anti-vandal MUGAs can reduce anti-social behaviour and increase fitness within early-teen age groups in both cities and parish localities. They are ideal for the urban areas that would benefit from a contained area where children can play safely. A MUGA can encourage people to explore the potential of different sports in a safe environment, built solely for that purpose.

The intense activity in a MUGA may increase noise and complaints from neighbours. The noise level depends on the material used for the fencing, and by the location. A 2015 research report recommended the MUGA construction be at least 30 metres (98 ft) from residential areas. In 2023, the intended installation of a MUGA at Much Hoole by the council noted potential impacts of noise, disturbance, and lighting, as well as questions about surround sporting facility usage, but this could be met by reduced hours of operation. A Chapel-en-le-Frith MUGA, built in 2010 following community fundraising, was removed in October 2025 following ongoing noise complaints from some nearby residents, but lamented by other site users.

It has also been considered the fenced locations have encouraged territorialisation, to the exclusion of female users.
