= John-Paul Lee =

American businessman

John-Paul Lee (이창선)
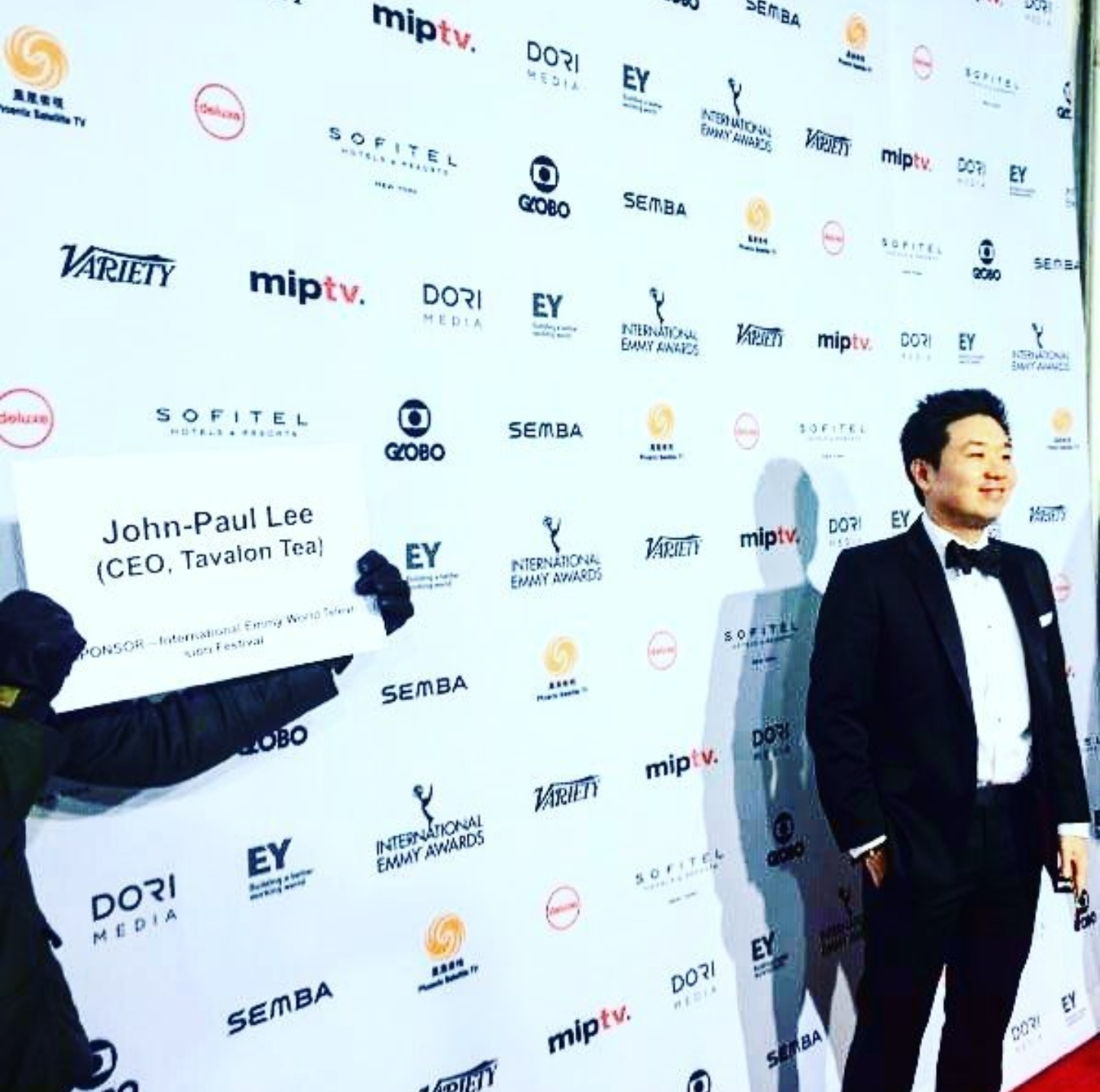
- John-Paul Lee at International Emmy Awards in New York City
- Born: October 12, 1978 (age 48); Fairfax, Virginia, U.S.
- Education: James Madison University
- Occupations: Founder & CEO of Tavalon Tea; Co-Founder & President of KosoFresh
- Website: Tavalon Tea; Kosofresh

John-Paul Lee aka 이창선 (born October 12, 1978) is the founder and CEO of Tavalon Tea, a New York City-based tea company that sells premium teas and related tea products from all over the world.

Lee received his BBA from James Madison University in 2001 with degrees in finance and computer information systems (CIS). Lee began his career as a consultant at Accenture (formerly Anderson Consulting) in 2001.

Lee left Accenture in 2005 to start Tavalon Tea in hopes of fulfilling a void in the US premium tea market and pursue his entrepreneurial dreams.

In September 2012, Lee partnered up with Marja Vongerichten of the Kimchi Chronicles (and wife of 3 Michelin Star Chef - Jean-Georges Vongerichten) to create his latest Korean restaurant venture, BiBiFresh aka. Kosofresh.

== Honors and awards ==
Lee has been profiled by many publications since he founded Tavalon Tea in 2005, including Entrepreneur, The New York Times, Business Week, theStreet.com, NPR, etc... Most recently, America.gov featured Lee in their gallery of successful start up entrepreneurs alongside Bill Gates, Michael Dell, Russell Simmons, Larry Page, Sergey Brin, Kevin Plank, & Mark Zuckerberg.

Lee was also recognized as a business leader by the Asian American Business Development Center (AABDC) and honored with the "Outstanding 50 Asian Americans in Business Award" in 2010. In 2011, the US Pan Asian American Chamber of Commerce bestowed Lee with the Top 10 Asian American Business Award for his accomplishments as a young and emerging entrepreneur.

In September 2011, Lee was selected as a member of the Entrepreneurial Sounding Board Committee for Columbia Business School, where he engages with MBA students and helps pursue their entrepreneurial ideas and ventures. Lee is also an official member and mentor within the Columbia Mentorship Program for Entrepreneurs at the Columbia University's Business School.

In October 2011, Lee was honored with a committee board seat for the Asian American Business Development Center(AABDC).

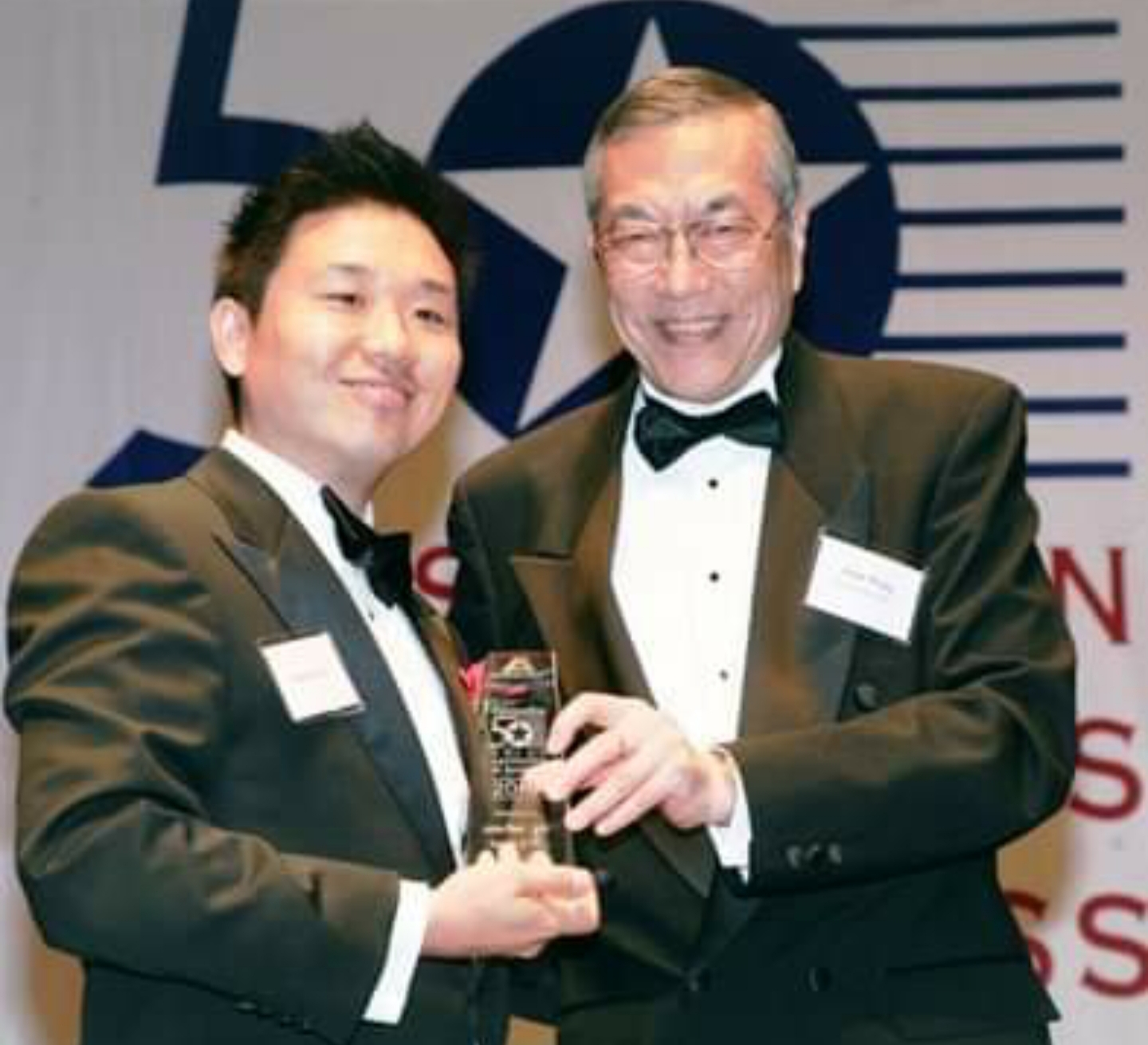
John-Paul Lee Recipient of the Outstanding 50 Asian Americans in Business Award

== Personal life ==
Lee was born on October 12, 1978, in Fairfax, Virginia, and raised in Great Falls, Virginia. Originally given a Korean name, Chang Sun Lee (이창선), he was renamed John-Paul Lee upon being blessed by Pope John Paul II in Washington, D.C. He moved to Seoul, Korea, at the age of 10, where he spent four years of his childhood and returned to the United States of America in 2003.

Lee currently resides in New York City but travels frequently to Asia, where he is in the process of expanding Tavalon Tea.

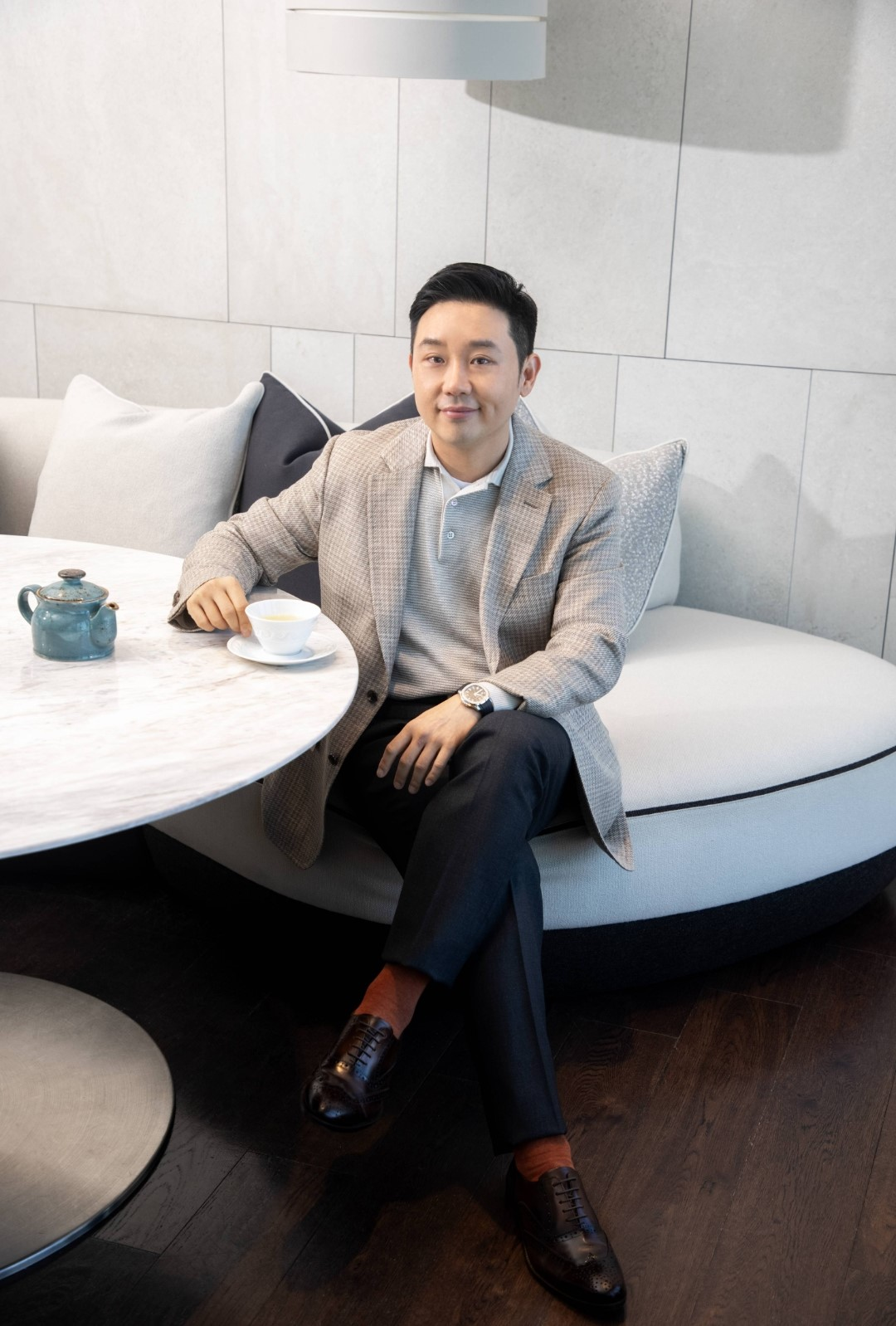
John-Paul Lee Interview with Noblesse Magazine
