= Charles Pinsky =

American television director and producer

Charles L. Pinsky is an American television producer and director who got his start in sports television but is more famous for his later focus on food and cooking shows. His career began with the Philadelphia Phillies and CBS Sports, which he left two decades ago to develop culinary related television.

Pinsky lives in New York City with his daughter Juliette. He has received five James Beard Foundation Awards for best television cooking series or special.

In 2008, he produced a travelogue starring Mario Batali, Gwyneth Paltrow, Mark Bittman, and Claudia Bassols which was aired on PBS.

Pinsky has his own production company, frappé, inc. located in New York City, and his credits include:

- Redbook's Family Chef
- Cuisine Rapide (1989 )
- Pierre Franey's Cooking in America (1992)
- Pierre Franey's Cooking in France (1995)
- Pierre Franey's Cooking in Europe (1997)
- Dessert Circus with Jacques Torres (1998)
- Chez Pépin with Jacques Pépin (2000)
- The Apprentice with Jacques Pépin (2003)
- A Spoonful of Ginger: Food as Medicine (2000)
- Jewish Cooking in America with Joan Nathan (39 episodes, 2002)
- The Kennedy Center: Mark Twain Prize for American Humor:
  - Celebrating the Humor of Carl Reiner (2001), the history of sitcoms
  - Celebrating the Humor of Whoopi Goldberg (2002), post-9/11 humor
- Once Upon a Potty for him (1990), Once Upon a Potty for her (1990)
- '"Barbecue University" I, II, III, IV (2002–06)
- '"The Potty Movie" (2007)
- Spain... on the Road Again (2008)
- Kimchi Chronicles (2011)

== Sources ==
- "Jewish Cooking: About the Show". PBS. Archived from the original on June 1, 2000.
- "LocateTV.com". Archived from the original on December 8, 2008. (for production years)
