= Youssef Guezoum =

American-Belgian film music composer and orchestrator

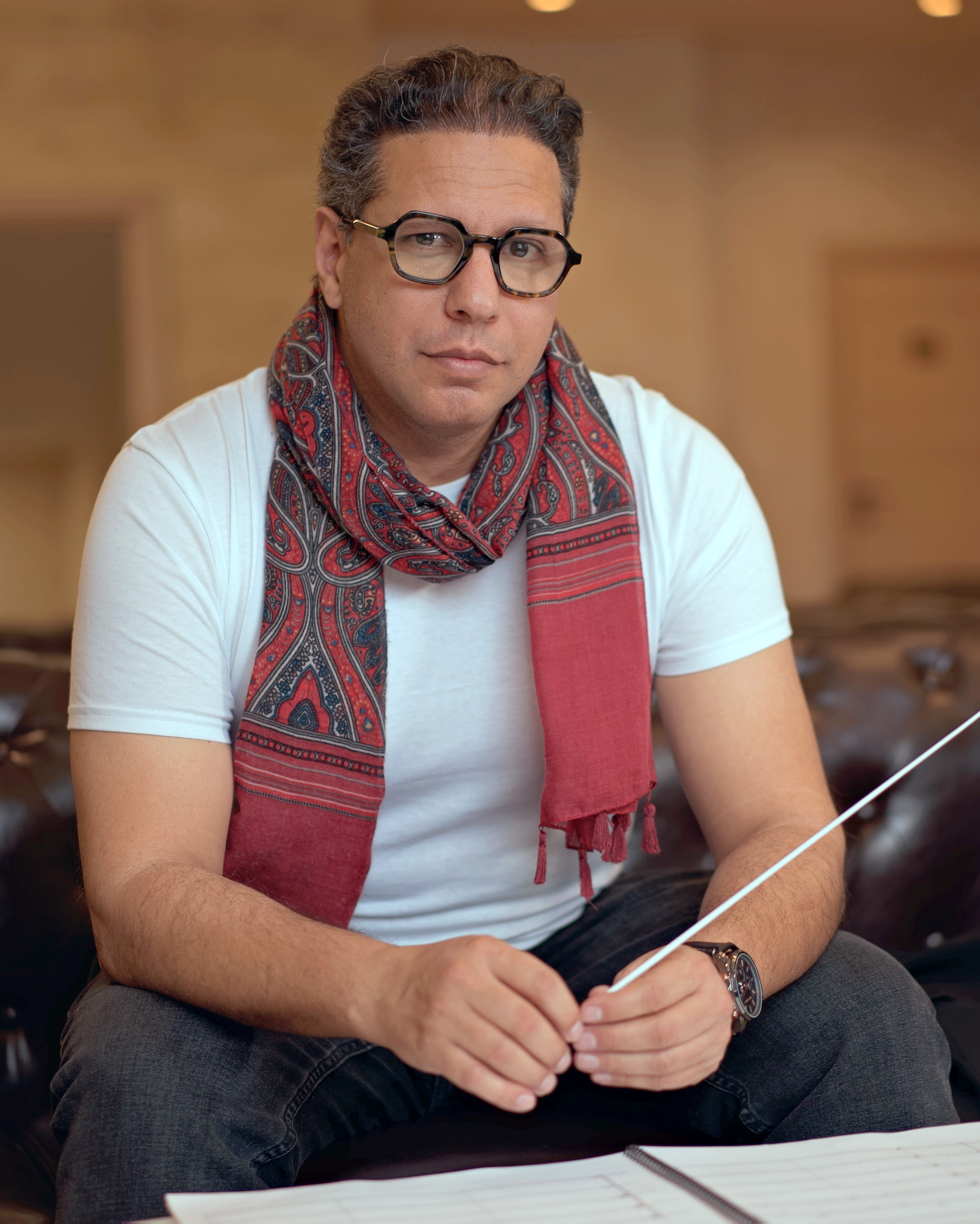
- Guezoum in 2025

Background information
- Also known as: JOE
- Born: Youssef Guezoum; Marrakesh, Morocco
- Genres: Film score; trailer music
- Occupations: Film music composer; orchestrator; conductor
- Instruments: Bass; Guitar; Piano
- Years active: 2005-present
- Member of: The Emmys, The SCL
- Website: www.youssefguezoum.com

Youssef Guezoum is a Belgian with Moroccan descent film composer, orchestrator, conductor, and sound designer based in Los Angeles. He has worked on a variety of international film and television productions and has received two nominations at the Hollywood Music in Media Awards (HMMA).

Youssef Guezoum HMMA Nomination - Hollywood 2024

== Early life ==
After completing high school, Guezoum moved to Canada to study sound engineering at the Vancouver Film School. In 1996, he relocated to Brussels, Belgium, where he studied classical music for four years and earned a degree from the Académie de Musique in Bruxelles. He moved to Los Angeles in 2013 after signing with a Hollywood agent.

== Career ==
Guezoum began composing for international media projects in the early 2000s. His credits include music for Power Rangers (produced by Saban Entertainment, with Noam Kaniel), the film Frenchy directed by Jean-Claude Van Damme, and several Middle Eastern television series. He has also provided music for projects at major studios including Paramount Pictures, Universal Music Group, Lionsgate Films, as well as television shows such as CSI: Miami, Secret & Lies, Hell's Kitchen, PGA Tour and Ultimate Justice.

In 2009, he collaborated with Belgian director Noureddine Zerrad on the short film Tension. The following year, he composed the score for Soldiers, featuring Jean-Claude Van Damme and Claudia Bassols.

In 2012, Guezoum co-composed music for the Arabic-language film War Game, in collaboration with Guillaume Didier. In 2014, he composed the score for Full Love, also directed by Van Damme. He later scored the action film Ultimate Justice, starring Mark Dacascos.

Guezoum is a member of the Oticons film composers agency.

== Awards and nominations ==
- Hollywood Music in Media Awards:
  - 2024 – Nominated – Original Score – TV Show/Limited Series (Foreign Language) – The Deep State TV Show Kuwait
  - 2024 – Nominated – Main Title Theme – TV Show (Foreign Language) – The Promise

== Filmography ==
- Monsters (2025)
- The Promise (2024)
- The Prisoner (2024)
- The Board (2024)
- The Deep State (2023)
- Unquenchable Thirst (2022)
- Vulnérable (2021)
- Frenchy (2021)
- Mazagan La Legende Daicha (2020)
- Power Rangers Beast Morphers (2019)
- Power Rangers Ninja Steel (2018)
- Route 66 (2018)
- Ultimate Justice (2016)
- Ankh (2015)
- The Eagle path (2014)
- War Game (2013)
- Beb El Fella - Le Cinemonde (2013)
- The Amityville Asylum (2013)
- Where My Heart Is (2013)
- Daylight (2013)
- Chaala (2012)
- Motorhome (2012)
- Casa Riders (2011)
- My Basement (2010)
- Ahmed Gassiaux (2010)
- Soldiers (2010)
- Tension (2009)
- Dương Đình Dũng (2001)
