= Top-rated United States television programs of 2011–12 =

This table displays the top-rated primetime television series of the 2011–12 season as measured by Nielsen Media Research.

| Rank | Program | Network | Rating |
|---|---|---|---|
| 1 | Sunday Night Football | NBC | 12.4 |
| 2 | NCIS | CBS | 12.3 |
| 3 | Dancing with the Stars | ABC | 12.0 |
| 4 | American Idol — Wednesday | FOX | 11.8 |
| 5 | American Idol — Thursday | FOX | 11.0 |
| 6 | Dancing with the Stars — Results | ABC | 10.6 |
| 7 | NCIS: Los Angeles | CBS | 10.2 |
| 8 | The Big Bang Theory | CBS | 9.7 |
| 9 | The Mentalist | CBS | 9.3 |
| 10 | The Voice | NBC | 9.2 |
| 11 | Two and a Half Men | CBS | 9.1 |
| 12 | Person of Interest | CBS | 9.0 |
| 13 | Criminal Minds | CBS | 8.6 |
| 14 | 60 Minutes | CBS | 8.3 |
| 15 | Modern Family | ABC | 8.1 |
| 16 | CSI: Crime Scene Investigation | CBS | 8.0 |
| 16 | Castle | ABC | 8.0 |
| 18 | Unforgettable | CBS | 7.9 |
| 19 | Blue Bloods | CBS | 7.8 |
| 19 | The Good Wife | CBS | 7.8 |
| 21 | Hawaii Five-0 | CBS | 7.6 |
| 21 | Grey's Anatomy | ABC | 7.6 |
| 23 | The X Factor — Thursday | FOX | 7.4 |
| 23 | The X Factor — Wednesday | FOX | 7.4 |
| 25 | Mike & Molly | CBS | 7.2 |
| 25 | Rob | CBS | 7.2 |
| 27 | CSI: Miami | CBS | 7.1 |
| 28 | 2 Broke Girls | CBS | 7.0 |
| 28 | Desperate Housewives | ABC | 7.0 |
| 28 | Once Upon a Time | ABC | 7.0 |
