= Sorea Band =

South Korean girl group

SOREA Band
- Origin: South Korea
- Genres: K-pop
- Years active: 2005–present
- Members: XOi
- Website: www.facebook.com/soreamedia

SOREA Band (Korean: 소리아밴드) is a K-pop Girl Group that bases their music on Traditional Korean musical instruments. They mix Korean traditional music with a variety of genres like Pop music and Jazz and communicate with the world through Korean ethnic music.

Their music has been used to advertise corporations such as Samsung Electronics, Hyundai Motors and LG Optimus G) and has been aired on Korean public TV MBC's 'Infinite Challenge (무한도전)’, K-Drama ‘Princess Hours (궁)’, and KBS ‘1 Night 2 Days (1박 2일)’. SOREA Band's music has also been broadcast overseas through PBS, NBC, HBO, BBC, NHK, and Brazil HBO Latin American through programs and advertisements.

SOREA Band has been invited to the White House to perform, conducted the first solo concert held at the Blue House and participated at the Mayor's Thames Festival in London, Champs Libres Festival in Strasbourg, France and a concert at Point Éphémère(France). In South Korea they have been selected for casting at events such as government official meetings and events. They have also performed various concerts in China, Japan, and Hong Kong.

== Performances ==
SOREA had a celebration concert for congratulating Kimoon Ban on his victory at UN Secretary General election in 2006. SOREA had a special invitation performance at the Mayor’s Thames Festival in London, 2009. The band also held a concert at Point Éphémère in Paris, 2010.

SOREA has gained interest from a lot of people as a modern Korean traditional music band possessing both musical quality and public popularity by performing at the very first concert held at the Blue House since it became publicly open in 2008 and at other occasions as well. It also made its lead producer the winner of the advanced intellectual person in Korea award. Its original composing "Beautiful Korea" was reckoned with its musical quality and was selected to be included in the music textbooks of junior high school.

SOREA has been chosen as an honorary ambassador to represent Ministry for Health, Welfare, and Family Affairs for 2010–2011, following Kim Yuna (Representative of 2009).

In 2011, SOREA's "Restart the Show" was selected as the title theme for the Kimchi Chronicles, 13 episodes of Korean food and travelogue series by PBS. SOREA is evangelizing Korean traditional music and traditional culture to the foreigners in the world by diligently working as a representative of traditional Korean art. SOREA's been persistently presenting newly arranged traditional beats and melodies with the slogan of modernizing, globalizing, and making Korean traditional art more publicly popular.

== Awards ==
- Selected as an honorary ambassador of the Ministry of Health and Welfare in 2011
- Selected as a 'advanced intellectual person in Korea' in 2010 (Ministry of Public Administration and Security)
- Win a Grand prize of donation in 2010 (Director of National Assembly)
- Named on Honorary ambassador for 'Ministry for Health, Welfare and Family Affairs' in 2010 (after Kim Yuna)
- "Beautiful Korea" selected to be included in Junior High School music textbooks in 2010
- Korea Sparkling Festival Achievement Award in 2009
- 21C Korean Music Project Participation Prize 21C in 2009
- Selected for Han style supplementary business by the ministry of culture, sports, tourism in 2009
- Best New Album Award received from Ministry of Culture, Sports, and Tourism(MCST) Secretary in 2006
- Culture and Art Development Project, creative program section at Arts Council Korea in 2006

== History ==
=== Sole concert ===
- "Sharing the Culture Together" concert in 2011 (held by Sejong Center for the Performing Arts)
- SOREA Concert in 2010 at Incheon Cultural Center
- SOREA Concert in 2009 at The Monsters’Theatre SOREA Concert At The Monsters’Theatre
- Charity Concert in 2009 at The Merry Hall (In the Seogang University)
- Invited for SOREA concert from Korea University in 2009
- The Very First Concert At The Blue House in 2008 (Presidential Event)
- SOREA Concert in 2008 at the Starry Night Concert At the Sejong Art Center
- Showcase at Club Catch light in 2006. Guests: SG Wannabe, M to M, Haul, etc.
- SOREA concert in 2006 at U Myun Dang, National Gugak Center. Promoted on MBC.
- SOREA concert in 2006 at Jindo Namdo Gugak Center

=== Overseas ===
- Selected Theme Song for PBS TV special documentary on Korea "Kimchi Chronicles" in 2011
- Strategic alliance formed with Poly from China in 2011 (music, concert promotion, management in China, etc.)
- Special guest performance in 2010 at the dinner show held by the Chamber of Commerce and Industry in Singapore
- Paris, France: Concert At Club Point Ephémère in 2010
- Strasbourg, France: Concert At Champs Libres Festival in 2010
- London, England: Concert At The Mayor's Thames Festival "A Scoop of Korea" Performance in 2009
- Harbin, China: Sole Concert in 2008 (Kookmin Bank invitation)
- Shenzhen, China: SOREA Performance in 2008 (Supported by Shenzhen Korea Association, Samsung Fire Insurance)
- Las Vegas, United States of America: AVING Special on 'CES 2007'
- Tokyo, Japan: SOREA Concert At the Club Heights in 2006 (Yahoo Japan sponsored)
- Shanghai, China: Sole Concert At the Lyceum Theater in 2006 (Supported by Shanghai Consulate general, Korea Tourism Organization)
- Tokyo, Japan: Nakano Hall Single Concert in 2006 (Korean Culture Center invitation, Supported by the Ministry of Foreign Affairs And Trade)
- Germany Worldcup: Concert Tour - Frankfurt, Weimar, Leipzig, Stuttgart in 2006 (FIFA Fanfest invitation)
- Taiwan Mobile Forum in 2006 (Invited, Samsung Supervised)
- Tokyo, Japan: Tokyo media & Artshobi live house Showcase in 2006
- Hochimin, Vietnam: SOREA Performance in 2006 (Invited, Supported by Hochimin Center, Korea Foundation)
- France: Participated in International Music Exhibition MIDEM 2006 (Selected by KOCCA - Korea Culture & Content Agency - as a best album)
- Almaty, Kazakhstan: "Dynamic Korea" in 2005 (Invited by Kazakhstan Embassy in Korea)

== Albums ==
Album	Release date	Songs
1st Single Album	2006.05.12.	1. Blow By Wind (한국어: 바람에 실어) (3:11); 2. I Would Sing This Song (한국어: 이 노래를 부를게요) (3:36); 3. Beautiful Korea (한국어: 뷰티풀 코리아) (4:23); 4. Trace (한국어: 흔적) (4:59); 5. Seoul In Panic (한국어: 공황 속 서울) (3:34)
Monsterious Story	2009.12.15.	1. In Panic (3:34); 2. Our Passage (4:24); 3. Unknown Conflict (2:59); 4. One To Five & Sing (3:48); 5. Endless Love (4:29); 6. Restart The Show (4:28)
Deepest Sorrow (Digital Single)	2011.04.08.	1. Deepest Sorrow (3:53)
A Song For You	2013.02.04.	1. Heart (4:03); 2. One To Five & Sing (3:48); 3. Once (4:43); 4. Heart (inst.) (4:04)
Zincha Zanchi (한국어: 진짜잔치)	2014.01.28.	1. Zincha Zanchi (3:55); 2. Zincha Zanchi (inst.) (3:55)
Aguiadiaracha (한국어: 어기야디여라차)	2014.02.28.	1. Aguiadiaracha (3:27); 2. Aguiadiaracha (inst.) (3:27)
Heartbeat Of The Deepest Sea	2014.05.30.	1. Arariga.Nat.Ne (한국어: 아라리가.났.네) (3:49); 2. Arariga.Nat.Ne (inst.) (3:49)
Eastern Angels of Winter	2014.11.28.	1. The First Noel (4:07); 2. Immortal Love (4:15)
