= Frenchy (film) =

Unreleased Thai-Hong Kong-American film by Jean-Claude Van Damme

- Directed by: Jean-Claude Van Damme
- Written by: Jean-Claude Van Damme
- Produced by: Jean-Claude Van Damme; Eugene Van Varenberg; Moshe Diamant
- Starring: Jean-Claude Van Damme; Claudia Bassols; John Colton; Josef Cannon; Chuck DiMaria; Adam Karst; Cal Rein
- Cinematography: Douglas Milsome
- Edited by: Jean-Claude Van Damme; Noureddine Zerrad
- Music by: Youssef Guezoum
- Production company: Rodin Entertainment
- Countries: Thailand; Hong Kong; United States
- Language: English

Frenchy (formerly known as Full Love, Soldiers and The Eagle Path) is an unreleased action drama written, produced, edited, and directed by Jean-Claude Van Damme, who also stars in the film as the main character Frenchy. The film also features two of his children, Kristopher Van Varenberg and Bianca Bree.

The first edit of the film was screened under the former title The Eagle Path during a special distributor screening at the 2010 Cannes Film Festival to find a distribution company for a potential theatrical release, but with no success. For that reason, in 2012, parts of the film were reshot and scenes added, the film was renamed Soldiers. Two years after, a new cut of the film with a title change to Full Love, was shown during a special distributor screening at the 2014 Shanghai International Film Festival. In 2018, Van Damme attended the Cannes Film Festival again and unsuccessfully tried to find a theatrical distributor for the third time. In 2020, the film was re-edited and renamed again to Frenchy and was still in search of a distributor. In 2022, the film under the original title The Eagle Path was still in search for a distributor.

== Cast ==
- Jean-Claude Van Damme as Frenchy
- Claudia Bassols as Sophia
- John Colton as Luther Banks
- Josef Cannon as Bobby Jackson
- Chuck DiMaria as Vinnie Scantino
- Adam Karst as Soli
- Cal Rein as Cal
- Bianca Bree as Bianca Banks
- Kristopher Van Varenberg as Oren
- Harry Taylor as Young Frenchy
- Shay Nicole Collins as Shelby Jackson

== Production ==
=== Filming ===
The first cut of Frenchy was filmed in Thailand in the summer of 2008 on a budget of $5 million. After an unsuccessful special screening in Cannes, organized in 2010 in order to find a distributor for a potential theatrical release, additional footage was shot in 2012 in Sofia, Bulgaria.

== Music ==
Composer Youssef Guezoum scored the film with additional songs produced by Clarence Jey and performed by Josef Gordon. Music Supervision by Clarence Jey.
