= The Returned (2013 film) =

2013 Spanish-Canadian thriller film by Manuel Carballo

- Neither Zombies Nor Humans
- Spanish: Retornados
- Directed by: Manuel Carballo
- Written by: Hatem Khraiche
- Produced by: George Ayoub; Julio Fernández; Gary Howsam; Bill Marks
- Starring: Emily Hampshire; Kris Holden-Ried; Shawn Doyle; Claudia Bassols
- Cinematography: Javier Salmones
- Edited by: Guillermo De La Cai
- Music by: Jonathan Goldsmith
- Production companies: Ramaco Media I Castelao Pictures; Canspan Film Factory
- Distributed by: Filmax International
- Release dates: 18 October 2013 (Sitges); 15 November 2013 (Spain)
- Running time: 98 minutes
- Countries: Spain; Canada
- Language: English
- Budget: $5,000,000 (estimated)
- Box office: $596,804

The Returned (Spanish: Retornados) is a 2013 Spanish-Canadian thriller film directed by Manuel Carballo, written by Hatem Khraiche, and starring Emily Hampshire, Kris Holden-Ried, Shawn Doyle, and Claudia Bassols. When a rare and difficult to obtain medicine that requires daily doses to stave off the effects of a zombie infection runs low, a physician (Hampshire) and her infected husband (Holden-Ried) go on the run to avoid angry demonstrators.

== Plot ==
In the 1980s, a zombie plague spreads worldwide and causes the deaths of an estimated 100 million people. An unprecedented amount of research goes into finding a cure, but the resulting medicine requires daily doses to be effective. If the infected miss even a single dose, they quickly and irrevocably degenerate to a feral zombie state. As the formula can only be extracted from dead feral zombies, there are constant rumors that the supplies will run out. Infected humans, called "the returned", are subject to discrimination and violence from uninfected humans.

Kate, a physician who cares for the returned and fundraises to support research to develop a synthetic medicine, has been stocking up on black market doses of the treatment, fearful that it will run out soon. Her husband Alex, a music teacher, became infected when he attempted to assist a man who he thought was having a seizure. Alex comes out as returned to his best friend Jacob, who readily accepts him. When protestors become violent, and the government begins to set up quarantine camps to try and quiet them all down as long as they possibly can, Jacob and his wife Amber invite Alex and Kate to stay with them outside the city. Alex narrowly avoids both an attempted murder and police searches.

When Kate's source turns up dead, and evidence points toward Amber, Kate instructs Alex to check on their supply of the treatment. Alex finds a single dose and a note from Jacob that apologizes for taking the rest, as Amber has become infected. With only one day left to live as a human, Alex becomes desperate to find a new source. Kate returns to the city and reveals her dilemma to the hospital chief, who gives her the hospital's entire stash. However, the parent of an infected child attempts to steal the container, and in the ensuing fight all the contents are destroyed.

Distraught, Kate returns empty-handed and comforts Alex, who has chained himself to the wall. Alex slowly experiences the symptoms of the change and demands that Kate shoot him in the head. Kate, who had a traumatic experience in her past, when her mother became infected, is reluctant to oblige him, but she kills him off-screen once he turns. As Kate returns to the city to settle her affairs, the hospital chief excitedly tells her that researchers have created a synthesized treatment. Kate falls to her knees in grief.

In the final scene, some months later, a pregnant Kate prepares to assassinate Jacob and Amber at a book tour.

== Cast ==
- Emily Hampshire as Kate
  - Romy Weltman as young Kate
- Kris Holden-Ried as Alex
- Shawn Doyle as Jacob
- Claudia Bassols as Amber
- Barry Flatman as Hospital Chief

== Production ==
The Returned began filming on 24 September 2012. Shooting took place in Toronto and Sudbury, Ontario, Canada, and post-production took place in Spain.

== Release ==
The Returned premiered at Sitges Film Festival. Distributed by Filmax, it was theatrically released on 15 November 2013. LevelFILM released it to US theaters and on video on demand on 14 February 2014. It grossed $335,948 in Spain and $56,341 in Turkey.

== Reception ==
The review aggregator Rotten Tomatoes reports that 58% of 19 surveyed critics gave the film a positive review; the average rating is 5.8/10. Metacritic rated it 47/100 based nine reviews. Jonathan Holland of The Hollywood Reporter called it "a smart, politically correct upending of the zombie myth, focusing with mixed results on the human rather than on the horror." Robert Abele of the Los Angeles Times called it "an admirable shake-up" that degenerates into predictable plot twists that lack suspense. Adam Nayman of The Globe and Mail rated it 2.5/4 stars and wrote, "The Returned doesn’t bring much new to the party, except maybe restraint." Bruce Demara of The Toronto Star wrote that the film's execution does not live up to its potential.

Rob Staeger of LA Weekly wrote, "The film suffers from a series of unsatisfying endings, but it's nonetheless refreshing to see a zombie movie with brains behind the camera instead of on the menu." Ed Gonzalez of Slant Magazine rated it 1.5/4 stars and wrote, "The Returned proves that the zombie narrative is still capable of subversion, but does so with the laziest, Lifetime-grade intimations of social relevance." Brad McHargue of Dread Central rated it 2.5/5 stars and wrote, "While The Returned is admirable in its attempts to inject social commentary and a unique twist into a stale subgenre, it's just so heavy-handed in attempts to drive the point home that it drowns out the pathos the film so desperately wants to have." Patrick Cooper of Bloody Disgusting rated it 3.5/5 stars and called it "an interesting film bursting with ideas and subtle ways of addressing them." Peter Martin of Twitch Film wrote that the themes are familiar but the "somber, thoughtful mood" makes up for it. Scott Weinberg of Fearnet called it "a smart, intense, and frequently tragic horror story."

== See also ==
- List of Spanish films of 2013
- List of Canadian films of 2014
