= Spain... on the Road Again =

American television series

- Genre: Food travelogue
- Starring: Mario Batali; Gwyneth Paltrow; Mark Bittman; Claudia Bassols
- Narrated by: Mario Batali
- Opening theme: "On the Road Again"
- Ending theme: "On the Road Again"
- Composer: Willie Nelson
- Country of origin: United States
- Original language: English
- No. of seasons: 1
- No. of episodes: 13

Production
- Executive producer: Charles Pinsky
- Producer: Eric Rhee
- Production location: Spain
- Running time: one hour

Original release
- Network: PBS
- Release: September 2008 – December 2008

Spain... on the road Again is a 2008 American food and travel series produced by PBS. The show features Iron Chef Mario Batali, actress Gwyneth Paltrow, New York Times food writer Mark Bittman, and Spanish actress Claudia Bassols. Each episode covers a different region of Spain as the foursome explore the country's culinary traditions and history.

Before the series premiere on PBS (the week of September 20, 2008), Paltrow and Batali promoted their tour and series on the September 17, 2008 episode of Oprah.

== Episode list ==
#	Title	Locations	USA Air date
101	“Tilting Windmills in Castilla la Mancha”	Castile–La Mancha and Madrid	September 20, 2008
102	“Pilgrimage to Galicia”	Galicia	September 27, 2008
103	“Coasting Along in Galicia”	Galicia	October 4, 2008
104	“Landmarks, Legends and the Lap of Luxury”	Basque Country	October 11, 2008
105	“Basking in Basque Country”	Basque Country	October 18, 2008
106	“Rockstar Surprise in Catalunya”	Catalonia	October 25, 2008
107	“From the Sublime to the Surreal”	Catalonia	November 1, 2008
108	“A Sultan’s View of Andalucía”	Andalucia	November 8, 2008
109	“Castillian Hog Heaven”	Castile & León	November 15, 2008
110	“Gawking at Gaudí and Asturian Adventures”	Asturias, Catalonia, and Castile & León	November 23, 2008
111	“Island Hopping”	Balearic Islands	November 29, 2008
112	“Pure Paella”	Valencia and Madrid	December 6, 2008
113	“Madrid and the End of the Road”	Madrid	December 13, 2008

== Other media ==
In October 2008, HarperCollins published a hardcover companion book, Spain... A Culinary Road Trip (ISBN 978-0-06-156093-4, OCLC 191930257), written by Batali, Paltrow, and Julia Turshen.

The 13-episode series was released as a 4-disc 16×9 NTSC DVD set (OCLC 274228881) in January 2009.
