= Gavilanes (TV series) =

Spanish television series

- Genre: Drama; Romance
- Based on: Pasión de gavilanes by Julio Jiménez
- Starring: Rodolfo Sancho; Roger Berruezo; Alejandro Albarracín; Claudia Bassols; Diana Palazón; Alicia Sanz; Fernando Andina; Carme Elías
- Country of origin: Spain
- Original language: Spanish
- No. of seasons: 2
- No. of episodes: 26

Production
- Production company: Gestmusic

Original release
- Network: Antena 3
- Release: 19 April 2010 – 22 February 2011

Gavilanes is a Spanish television series, consisting of an adaptation of the Colombian telenovela Pasión de gavilanes. Produced by Gestmusic, its two seasons aired from 2010 to 2011 on Antena 3.

== Premise ==
Lidia—the younger of the orphan Reyes siblings—falls in love with Bernardo Elizondo, a man 30 years her senior. Both die in a car crash. Suspecting of a homicide, the other three Reyes siblings (Juan, Óscar and Frank) get to be hired to work in the Elizondo estate, seeking to find out what really happened to Lidia. Once inside the rich property, both three brothers will fall in love with the Elizondo sisters, Norma, Sara and Lucía.

== Cast ==
- Rodolfo Sancho as Juan Reyes.
- Roger Berruezo as Óscar Reyes.
- Alejandro Albarracín as Frank Reyes.
- Claudia Bassols as Norma Elizondo.
- Diana Palazón as Sara Elizondo Cortés.
- Alicia Sanz as Lucía Elizondo.
- Carme Elías as Sofía Cortés.
- Fernando Andina as Fernando Ribas.
- Norma Ruiz as Rosario Montes.
- Benito Sagredo as Víctor Abreu.
- Marta Calvó as Eva Suárez.
- Daniela Costa as Claudia Aguirre.
- Manel Barceló as Adrián Cortés.
- Jordi Martínez as Mario Nestares.
- Roberto Álvarez as Bernardo Elizondo.
- Miriam Giovanelli as Lidia Reyes.

Introduced in season 2

- Mercè Llorens as Olivia.
- Adrià Collado as Álvaro.
- Pere Molina as Jaime.
- Oriol Vila as Ray.
- Marta Marco as Laura.

== Production and release ==
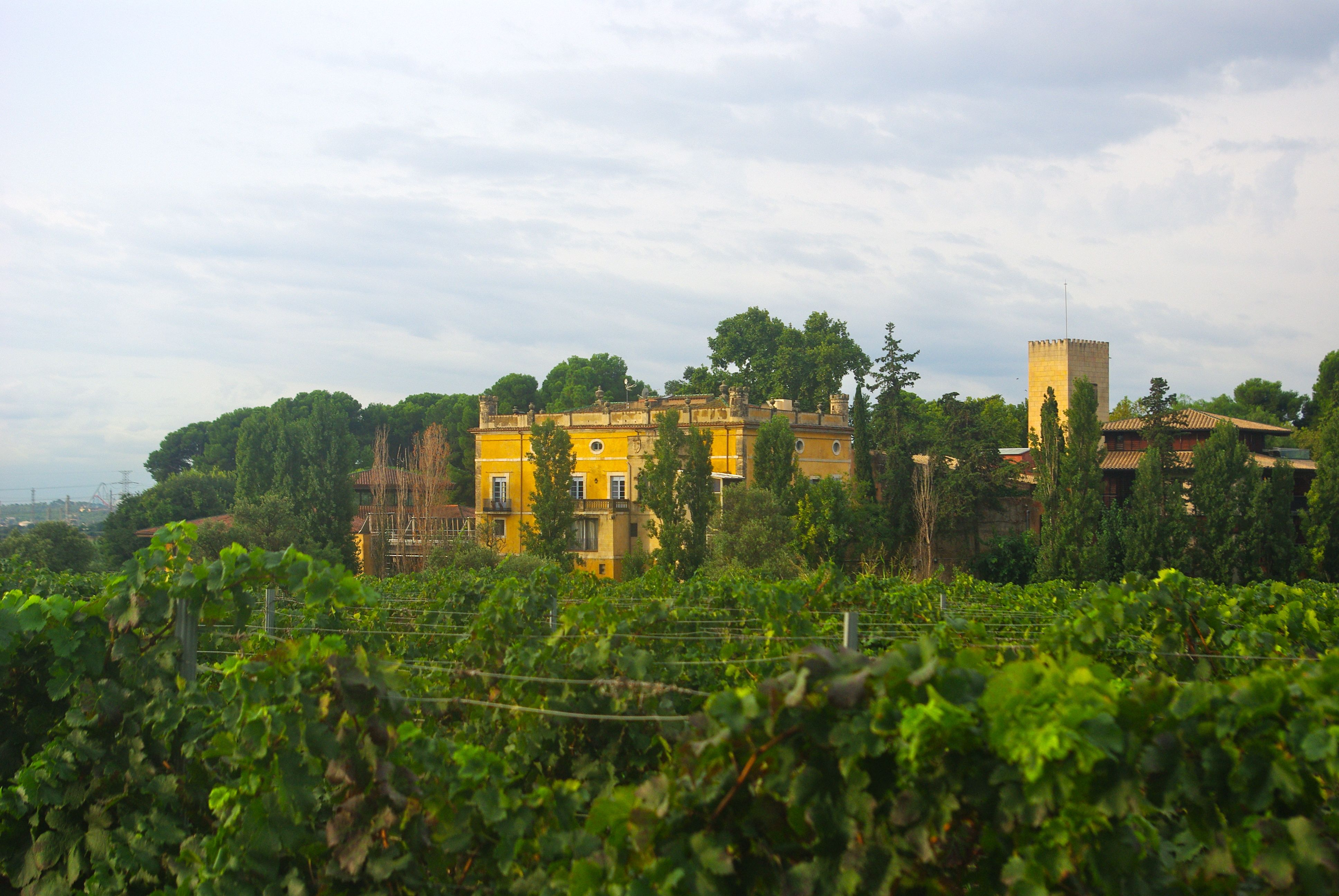
The masia of 'La Boella' was a prime shooting location

Produced by Gestmusic, Gavilanes was an adaptation of the Colombian telenovela Pasión de gavilanes, created by Julio Jiménez. Filming started in La Boella a masia in the province of Tarragona. Season 1 premiered on 19 April 2010 on Antena 3. The finale was scheduled for 12 July 2020, but the celebrations because of the Spanish win in the FIFA World Cup Final delayed the broadcasting to 15 July. The broadcasting run of season 2 ended on 22 February 2011, bringing a total of 26 episodes for the series.

Series	Episodes	Originally released			Ref.
Series	Episodes	First released	Last released	Network	Ref.
1	13	19 April 2010	15 July 2010	Antena 3	
2	13	1 November 2010	22 February 2011	Antena 3	

=== Season 1 ===
No. overall	No. in season	Title	Original release date
1	1	"Se avecina una tragedia"	19 April 2010
2	2	"Búsqueda de pruebas"	26 April 2010
3	3	"Pedida de mano"	3 May 2010
4	4	"Los celos de Norma"	10 May 2010
5	5	"Cámara de seguridad"	17 May 2010
6	6	"La figura de un padre"	24 May 2010
7	7	"La inauguración"	31 May 2010
8	8	"La alianza"	7 June 2010
9	9	"La aventura de Sara"	14 June 2020
10	10	"La duda de Norma"	21 June 2020
11	11	"El coche de la laguna"	28 June 2020
12	12	"Eva consigue vengarse"	5 July 2020
13	13	"Juan, detenido e imputado"	15 July 2020

=== Season 2 ===
No. overall	No. in season	Title	Original release date
14	1	"Las vidas de Juan y Fernando, en peligro"	1 November 2010
15	2	"Álvaro amenaza la relación de Óscar y Sara"	8 November 2010
16	3	"Los hermanos Reyes, a punto de perder su primera cosecha"	15 November 2010
17	4	"Juan ve cómo Sofía y Fernando vuelven a besarse"	22 November 2010
18	5	"Juan y Norma esperan ilusionados su primera producción de aceite"	29 November 2010
19	6	"Sara se da cuenta de que siente algo especial por Álvaro"	13 December 2010
20	7	"El embarazo de Norma no va bien"	20 December 2010
21	8	"Olivia y Jaime se encuentran un cadáver"	18 January 2011
22	9	"La salud de Norma flaquea"	25 January 2011
23	10	"Lucía y Frank vuelven a acercarse"	1 February 2011
24	11	"Norma deja a Juan"	8 February 2011
25	12	"Lucía quiere recuperar a Frank"	15 February 2011
26	13	"Juan y Norma retoman su relación"	22 February 2011
