= Fernando Andina =

Spanish actor

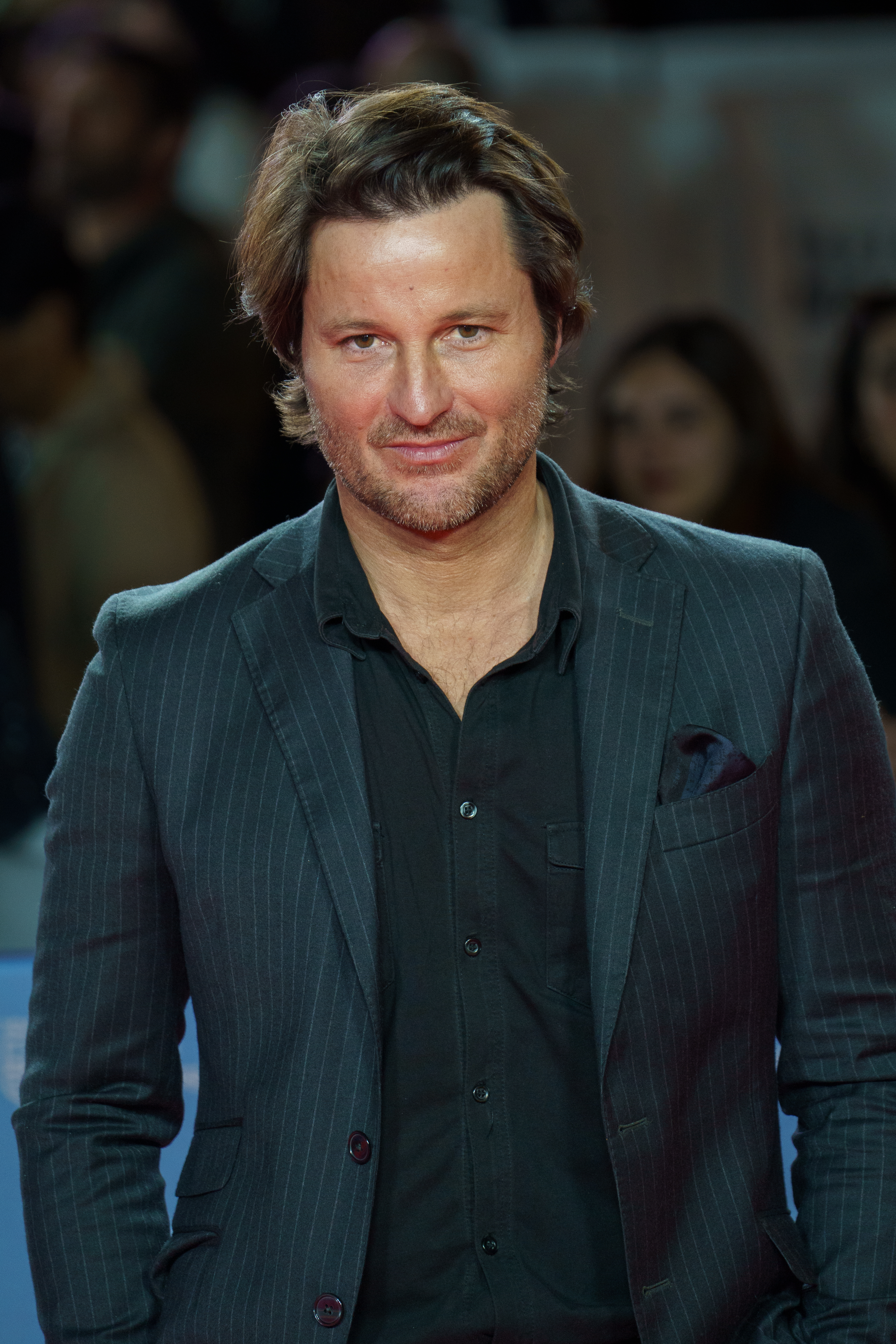
- Andina in 2025
- Born: 22 May 1976 (age 50); Madrid, Spain
- Occupation: Actor

Fernando Andina (born 22 May 1976) is a Spanish actor.

Born in Madrid, he studied drama in the United States and Spain. He landed his first main role was in the television series Al salir de clase.

== Filmography ==
- El palo (2001), by Eva Lesmes.
- Más de mil cámaras velan por tu seguridad (2003), by David Alonso
- El último alquimista (2005), by Nicolás Caicoya.
- El ciclo Dreyer (2006), by Álvaro del Amo.

=== Short films ===
- Gatos (2002), by Toni Bestard and Adán Martín

== Television ==
- Al salir de clase (2000-2001). (Telecinco).
- El comisario (2002-2009). (Telecinco).
- Sin tetas no hay paraíso (2009). (Telecinco).
- Gavilanes (2010-2011). (Antena 3).
- Física o Química (2011). (Antena 3).

== Theatre ==
- Hillbillie wedding
- Aspirina para dos
- Annie get your gun
- Los engranajes
- Tierra de nadie
