= Tavalon Tea =

Tea company in New York City

Tavalon, LLC.
- Type: Company-Owned & Managed
- Industry: Food & Beverage
- Founded: New York, New York (2005)
- Headquarters: New York, New York & South Hackensack, New Jersey, US
- Key people: John-Paul Lee, Founder & CEO
- Products: Teas; Tea Accessories; Tea Cocktails; Tea Beauty Products; Tea Treats
- Website: Tavalon.com Global Headquarters Tavalon Middle East Tavalon Korea Tavalon Australia Tavalon China Tavalon Japan

Tavalon Tea is a New York City based tea company that sells premium loose-leaf teas and related tea products from all over the world. The music inspired tea company categorizes their blends and infusions as Mixes, Remixes, & Uncuts.

The company was founded by John-Paul Lee aka. 이창선 in 2005. Lee, then a Management Consultant at Accenture, saw a business opportunity in tea while residing in Europe. The tea consumption volumes in the European market came to him as a shock, as an American, used to the frenetically fast-paced life coffee chains have inspired. Upon returning to the States, Lee brought the seed of inspiration of tea with him, sharing it with his friend, and another Tavalon Co-Founder, Sonny Caberwal. The two noticed a void in the luxury tea market in the United States and after 3 years of planning, they both quit their corporate jobs to launch Tavalon Tea.

Lee and Caberwal opened their first Tavalon Tea Bar in Union Square Park in Manhattan. In January 2008, Tavalon Tea Bar was featured as the number 1 reason in Imbibe Magazine's "10 Things We Love About Tea" survey. Tavalon Tea is headquartered in New York, New York and operates a website for online retail purchases from their warehouse facility in , New Jersey.

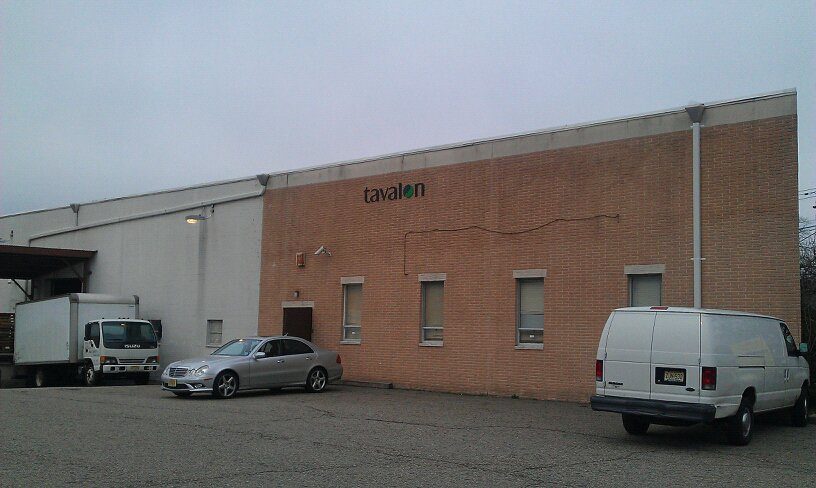
Tavalon Tea HQ in Wood-Ridge, NJ

Currently, Tavalon Tea is available through in over 8500 high-end restaurants/hotels/spas/corporations around the world, including Bloomingdale's, Plaza Hotel, Le Meridien, Morimoto, Goldman Sachs, Shinsegae, Benjamin's Steakhouse, JPMorganChase, Grand Hyatt, New York Life, and Ritz Carlton.

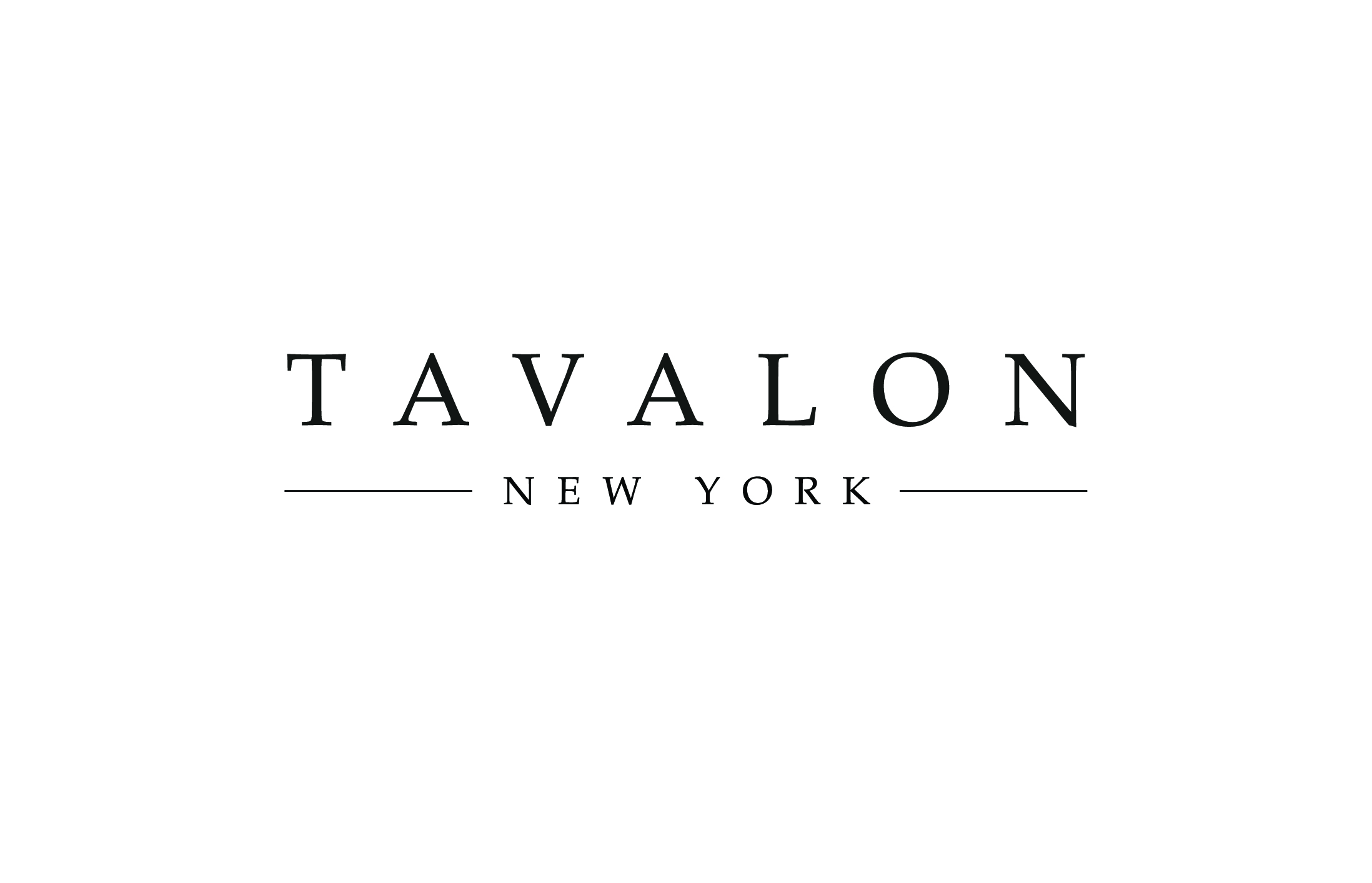
Tavalon New York Official Logo

The company entered into the international markets in 2008 with its first subsidiary office opening in Seoul, South Korea. Since then Tavalon has launched additional subsidiary offices in New Jersey, Los Angeles, Dubai, Hong Kong, Cairo, Sydney, Gold Coast, Osaka, Phnom Penh, and Beijing.

Tavalon Tea opened its first fine-dining restaurant in Seoul, South Korea in 2017. MajesTEA Tavalon Tea Lounge (마제스티 타바론 티 라운지) specializes in dishes infused with tea ingredients globally sourced by its Tea Sommelier.

== Charitable Donations ==
Tavalon Tea collaborates with various charities and organizations throughout the United States. The company donates products, proceeds from sales, and holds events to raise funds for numerous charitable projects. UNICEF / Red Cross Haiti Relief & Development Fund / Seeds of Peace / Feeding America / Felix Foundation / Art of Farming / Korean American Community Foundation.

== Sponsorships ==
The company works with various entities throughout the world including the Grammy Awards, Emmy Awards, Mercedes-Benz, Montblanc, Quintessentially, Bvlgari, Juicy Couture, People Magazine, and WebMD. Tavalon has partnered with the International Emmy Awards, held in New York City, and served their signature teas and tea cocktails to honorees and guests for 10 years since 2010.
