= Kimchi Chronicles =

American television food program

- Genre: Food travelogue
- Directed by: Charles Pinsky
- Starring: Marja Vongerichten; Jean-Georges Vongerichten
- Opening theme: "Restart the Show"
- Composer: SOREA
- Country of origin: United States
- Original language: English
- No. of seasons: 1
- No. of episodes: 13

Production
- Executive producers: Frappé Inc. (Charles Pinsky); Eric Rhee; Diana Kang; Jung Sook Park; Sara Park; Marja Vongerichten
- Producer: Eric Rhee
- Production locations: Korea; US
- Running time: 30 minutes

Original release
- Network: Syndicated to public television
- Release: July 2011 – September 2011

Kimchi Chronicles is an American food program airing on PBS that is part travelogue, part food narrative, and part documentary of self-discovery. Host Marja Vongerichten, a Korean American adoptee, explores Korean food and culture, and her unique life story is told throughout the series. In the show, viewers experience Korea through Marja's distinct perspective.

Each episode begins in Korea, where Marja, her husband Jean-Georges Vongerichten, and other special guests travel to different areas of Korea and taste their local foods. Then, they return to New York, where they recreate Korean recipes, specifically tailored for a modern American kitchen. Episodes cover different categories of food, providing a comprehensive overview of Korean food.

The show features acclaimed chef Jean-Georges Vongerichten, actress Heather Graham, and actor Hugh Jackman and his wife, actress Deborra-Lee Furness who are also upstairs neighbors in New York City of the Vongerichten family.

The show was sponsored by the Visit Korea Committee, Korean Food Foundation, Ministry of Culture, Sports and Tourism and Ministry for Food, Agriculture, Forestry and Fisheries.

The production company for the show was Frappé, Inc., which is owned by Charles Pinsky.

== Episode list ==
Episode	Title	Location	Episode Location Detail Page	Episode Summary	Original air date
101	"The Kimchi Chronicles Begin"	Seoul, New York City	Seoul, New York	The Kimchi Chronicles Begin is an introduction to the basics of Korean cooking featuring Hugh Jackman and Deborra-Lee Furness.	July 2, 2011
102	"The Rice Chronicles"	Seoul, Busan	Seoul, Busan	The Rice Chronicles explore Korea's most prized staple food with Marja's friend Heather Graham.	July 9, 2011
103	"The Jeju Chronicles"	Jeju	Jeju	The Jeju Chronicles explore Jeju Island, the Hawaii of Korea.	July 16, 2011
104	"The Seafood Chronicles"	Seoul, Sokcho	Seoul, Sokcho	The Seafood Chronicles dive into the waters surrounding the South Korean peninsula.	July 23, 2011
105	"The Bean Chronicles"	Seoul, Chodang, Jeonju	Seoul, Chodang, Jeonju	The Bean Chronicles tap into the history of Korean cooking and culture.	July 30, 2011
106	"The Beef Chronicles"	Seoul, Andong	Seoul, Andong	The Beef Chronicles trace the history of beef in Korea along with Heather Graham, Hugh Jackman, and Deborra-Lee Furness.	August 6, 2011
107	"The Fish Chronicles"	Seoul, Sokcho, Busan	Seoul, Sokcho, Busan	The Fish Chronicles explore the entire coastlines of Korea with Heather Graham.	July 7, 2011
108	"The Seoul Food Chronicles"	Seoul	Seoul	The Seoul Food Chronicles cover the best of Seoul, from late-night drinks to striking fashion and street food.	August 20, 2011
109	"The Chicken Chronicles"	Chuncheon, Andong	Chuncheon, Andong	The Chicken Chronicles explore Korea's most beloved chicken dishes all over the country.	July 17, 2011
110	"The Noodle and Dumpling Chronicles"	Seoul	Seoul	The Noodle and Dumpling Chronicles cover every favorite noodle and dumpling dish in Korea with plenty of slurping along the way.	July 31, 2011
111	"The Pork Chronicles"	Seoul	Seoul	The Pork Chronicles get into the Korean love for everything pig.	September 10, 2011
112	"The Street Food Chronicles"	Seoul, Sokcho	Seoul, Sokcho	The Street Food Chronicles explore all of the hugely popular Korean dishes from street carts and stands and dishes are shared with Hugh Jackman.	September 17, 2011
113	"The Kimchi Chronicles Conclude"	Seoul, Sokcho, Pyeongchang	Seoul, Sokcho, Pyeongchang	The Kimchi Chronicles Conclude brings the show full circle and is all about special occasions.	September 24, 2011

== Other media ==
In August 2011, Rodale, Inc. published a hardcover companion cookbook, The Kimchi Chronicles: Korean Cooking for an American Kitchen (ISBN 978-1-60961-127-9), written by Marja Vongerichten with Julia Turshen.

The 13-episode series was released on DVD in October 2011 (ISBN 978-0-615-54426-7).

On October 16, 2012, Marja Vongerichten was a guest speaker at the George Washington University Jack Morton Auditorium, where she presented a humorous lecture about the Kimchi Chronicles, Korean culture, and her biracial identity. The Korean Cultural Center, Embassy of the Republic of Korea, organized and sponsored the event.

== Books ==
- Vongerichten, Marja; (foreword by Jean Georges Vongerichten), The Kimchi Chronicles: Korean cooking for an American kitchen, Emmaus, PA: Rodale Books, 2011. ISBN 978-1-60961-127-9
