= Point Éphémère =

Music venue in Paris

Coordinates: 48.8814°N 2.3685°E

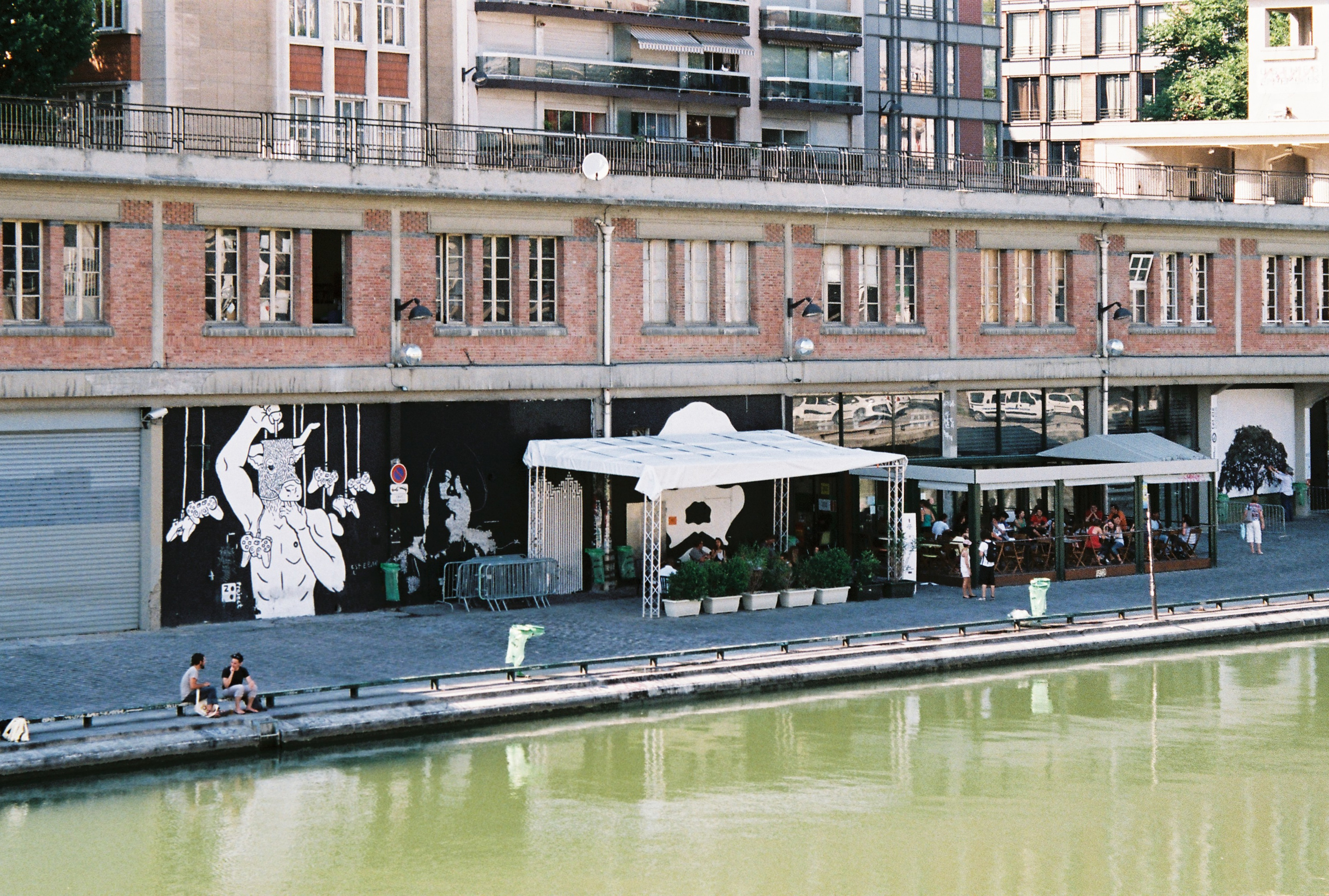

Point Ephémère (French pronunciation: [pwɛ̃ efemɛʁ]) is a live music venue located in the 10th arrondissement of Paris. Opened in 2004 in a former warehouse overlooking the Canal Saint-Martin, Point Ephémère has become a dynamic artistic center, with a wide range of concerts and exhibitions. It also aims to develop new talent by providing spaces dedicated to artist residencies.

== Background ==
Point Ephémère is part of a wider project by the collective Usines Ephémère, which rehabilitates vacant buildings awaiting demolition into temporary artistic and creative spaces. It welcomes all kinds of artists through its art, dance, and rehearsal studios and strives to provide tools for public recognition of their work.

Point Ephémère’s eclectic programming features exhibitions, performances, concerts, parties, conferences, workshops, and other events. Widely recognised French and international artists have already played on its stage, such as Adele, Flavien Berger, Zaho de Sagazan, Wet Leg, WU LYF and King Krule.

Point Ephémère is supported by the Mayor of Paris, the Regional Council of Île-de-France, the Direction régionale des affaires culturelles of Île-de-France and Centre national de la chanson, des variétés et du jazz (CNV).
