= Rob (TV series) =

American sitcom

- Genre: Sitcom
- Created by: Rob Schneider; Lew Morton
- Starring: Rob Schneider; Cheech Marin; Claudia Bassols; Diana Maria Riva; Eugenio Derbez; Lupe Ontiveros
- Country of origin: United States
- Original language: English
- No. of seasons: 1
- No. of episodes: 8

Production
- Executive producers: Kim Tannenbaum; Eric Tannenbaum; Rob Schneider; Lew Morton
- Camera setup: Multi-camera
- Running time: 22 minutes
- Production companies: The Tannenbaum Company; CBS Productions

Original release
- Network: CBS
- Release: January 12 – March 1, 2012

Rob (stylized as ¡Rob!) is an American sitcom television series that premiered on CBS on January 12, 2012, at 8:30 pm (ET) as a mid-season replacement for Rules of Engagement, and ended on March 1, 2012. The series stars Rob Schneider alongside Cheech Marin, Claudia Bassols, Diana Maria Riva, Eugenio Derbez, Ricky Rico, and Lupe Ontiveros. The show was produced by Two and a Half Men's The Tannenbaum Company and CBS Productions.

On May 13, 2012, CBS canceled the series after one season.

== Synopsis ==
The series follows Rob (Rob Schneider), a former lifelong bachelor and landscape architect with obsessive–compulsive disorder (OCD), who marries into a tight-knit Mexican-American family and attempts to be closer to them, often ending in disastrous results despite his good intentions.

== Cast and characters ==
- Rob Schneider as Rob
- Claudia Bassols as Maggie, Rob's much-younger wife
- Cheech Marin as Fernando, Maggie's cynical father
- Diana Maria Riva as Rosa, Maggie's wise-cracking and sarcastic mother who sees through all of Fernando's ploys
- Eugenio Derbez as Hector, Rosa's brother, Maggie's uncle, and the self-proclaimed "best friend" of Rob
- Lupe Ontiveros as Abuelita, Fernando's mother and Maggie's grandmother

== Production ==
The pilot first appeared on CBS's development slate in October 2010. On February 4, 2011, CBS placed a pilot order, written by Rob Schneider and Lew Morton, and directed by Jamie Widdoes. The series' executive producers were Schneider, Morton, and Kim and Eric Tannenbaum. The series then premiered January 12, 2012, and concluded on March 1, 2012, after eight episodes.

== Episodes ==
No.	Title	Directed by	Written by	Original release date	U.S. viewers (millions)
1	"Pilot"	James Widdoes	Lew Morton & Rob Schneider	January 12, 2012	13.47
Rob meets his new wife's Mexican family, and his first day with them is a fiasco.
2	"Second Wedding"	Andrew Weyman	Phoef Sutton	January 19, 2012	11.41
Maggie's parents want Rob and Maggie to have a second wedding, which leads to several arguments.
3	"The Pillow"	James Widdoes	Neil Casey	January 26, 2012	11.50
Maggie tries to redecorate the house by putting a new pillow on the couch, which makes Rob uncomfortable and leads to a fight. Meanwhile, Hector gets a job at Fernando's car wash, which he totally screws up.
4	"Family Secrets"	Mark Cendrowski	Michael Glouberman	February 2, 2012	11.06
Rob inadvertently starts a fight between Fernando and Rosa when he shares an old secret that Maggie had told to him. Wondering if Maggie has any such secrets, Rob then "discovers" an old picture of Maggie with a hot former boyfriend and becomes jealous, thinking he is not good enough for her.
5	"Rob Learns Spanish"	John Whitesell	Danny Jacobson & Norma Vela	February 9, 2012	10.74
Rob secretly asks Hector to teach him Spanish so that he can understand what Maggie's family is saying about him. Meanwhile, Fernando lies to Rosa about his diet and exercising.
6	"The Baby Bug"	Andrew Weyman	Danny Jacobson & Norma Vela	February 16, 2012	10.65
Maggie and her parents use a cute baby to try to make Rob change his mind about not wanting children. Meanwhile, the family helps Fernando with a commercial for his car wash franchise.
7	"Romantic Weekend"	Andrew Weyman	Joe Furey	February 23, 2012	10.33
Rob plans a romantic weekend at home with Maggie. However, when Fernando kicks out Hector and Rosa subsequently kicks out Fernando, they both move in with Rob and ruin the weekend.
8	"Dad Comes to Visit"	Andrew Weyman	Laura Valdivia	March 1, 2012	8.99
Rob's father (Fred Willard) comes to visit and bonds with Maggie's family more than he ever has with Rob. Meanwhile, Rosa tries to teach Hector to cook.

=== U.S. Nielsen ratings ===
Order	Episode	Viewers (millions)	Rating/Share		Rank	
Order	Episode	Viewers (millions)	18–49	Household	Night	Week
1	"Pilot"	13.47	4.1/11	7.8/12	3	9
2	"Second Wedding"	11.41	3.5/9	6.9/10	5	15
3	"The Pillow"	11.50	3.5/9	6.8/10	3	10
4	"Family Secrets"	11.06	3.3/9	6.6/10	5	12
5	"Rob Learns Spanish"	10.74	3.3/9	6.4/10	4	20
6	"The Baby Bug"	10.65	3.2/9	6.3/10	5	19
7	"A Romantic Weekend"	10.33	2.9/8	6.2/10	5	22
8	"Dad Comes to Visit"	8.99	2.6/7	—N/a	4	—N/a

== International broadcast ==
In Canada, the series airs on Global and premiered on January 19, 2012, after The Office.

== Reception ==
Reviews for Rob were generally unfavorable. Jace Lacob of The Daily Beast described it as CBS's "worst new show" and wrote of the first episode that "there isn't a single Latin name among the writers or producers" and that it "offers a wafer-thin appreciation and awareness of Mexican culture, one that doesn't go beyond guacamole and the occasional use of the Spanish endearment mija (my daughter)." Robert Bianco of USA Today wrote in his review that "Some of this barrage of stereotypes might be passable if even one character were intelligently written and skillfully played, but there's hardly a moment or performance in Rob that doesn't reek of the leftover and the second-rate" and that "Schneider's the only actor who even seems to be trying". In a more positive review, Glenn Garvin of The Miami Herald wrote in his review that the show is a "rather funny sitcom about the cultural collisions that occur every day in an increasingly blended America". The show received a 28/100 rating on Metacritic.

=== Season ratings ===
Season	Episodes	Time slot (ET/PT)	Season premiere		Season finale		Rank	Viewers (millions)	
Season	Episodes	Time slot (ET/PT)	Date	Viewers (millions)	Date	Viewers (millions)	Rank	Total	Adults 18–49
1	8	Thursdays 8:30 p.m.	January 12, 2012	13.47	March 1, 2012	8.99	25th	12.01	4.75
