= Claudia Bassols =

Spanish actress (born 1979)

- Born: Claudia Bassols Alonso; 3 October 1979 (age 46); Barcelona, Spain
- Occupation: Actress
- Years active: 2006–present
- Website: claudiabassols.com

Claudia Bassols Alonso (Catalan: [ˈklawðiə βəˈsɔls], Spanish: [ˈklawðja βaˈsols]; born 3 October 1979) is a Spanish actress from Barcelona.

== Career ==
Bassols graduated from the American School of Barcelona in 1997, earned a degree in Musical Comedy from Coco Comín in Barcelona, and studied English language and literature at the University of Barcelona. She has also studied drama in Paris, London, Los Angeles, North Carolina (UNC Wilmington), and Australia (NIDA). Bassols speaks Catalan, Spanish, English, French, Italian, and Swedish.

Bassols appeared with Amber Tamblyn in the 2008 film Blackout; and in 2008 was featured in the PBS series Spain... on the Road Again alongside Mario Batali, Gwyneth Paltrow, and Mark Bittman. In 2009 Bassols filmed a lead role for The Eagle Path with Jean-Claude Van Damme. After a 2010 screening at Cannes, additional footage was shot in Sofia Bulgaria in 2012, and the recut film has been released as Full Love.

In October 2010 Bassols was included in Esquire magazine's Sexiest Women Alive Atlas.

== Filmography ==
Spanish or Catalan language (title links are to Spanish Wikipedia)

- Mis adorables vecinos: "Hasta el 2016" (March 19, 2006) as Sheila
- El Mundo de Chema (11 episodes, 2006) as Carmen
- El Coronel Macià (2006) as Núria/Secretaria La Veu – A film about Francesc Macià, with some dialog in Catalan, French, and English
- C.L.A No somos ángeles (59 episodes, 2007) as Elena Rincón
- Amar en tiempos revueltos (26 episodes, 2008) as Esperanza
- Anna (2008) as Anna – with some dialog in French and Catalan
- La Riera (12 episodes, 2010) as Laia
- Gavilanes (26 episodes, 2010–2011) as Norma Elizondo

English language

- Blackout (2008) as Pretty Woman
- Spain... on the Road Again (2008, 13 episodes) as herself
- Paintball (2009) as Claudia
- The Eagle Path / Full Love (2010/2014) as Sophia
- Emulsion (2010) as Isabella
- One in the Chamber (2012, aka Shoot the Killer) as Janice Knowles
- Rob (TV series) (2012) as Maggie
- The Returned (2014) as Amber
- Knightfall (TV series) (2017) as Queen Elena of Aragon
